= 1999–2000 USM Alger season =

USM Alger
1999–2000 season
- President: Saïd Allik
- Head coach: Rabah Saâdane (until April 2000); Mustapha Heddane (from April 2000)
- Stadium: Stade Omar Hammadi
- Super Division: 12th
- Algerian Cup: Round of 16
- Algerian League Cup: Semi-finals
- African Cup Winners' Cup: First Round
- CAF Cup: Quarter-finals
- Top goalscorer: League: Athmane Samir Amirat (4 goals); All: Athmane Samir Amirat (4 goals)

In the 1999–2000 season, USM Alger is competing in the Super Division for the 20th time, as well as the Algerian Cup. It is their 5th consecutive season in the top flight of Algerian football. They will be competing in Ligue 1, the Algerian Cup, Algerian League Cup, CAF Cup, and the African Cup Winners' Cup. 1999–2000 season was the worst season since the rise of the Red and Black and finished in last place and Rabah Saâdane was dismissed from his position as coach after he had failed to achieve what was required in all competitions but in this season, there was no fall to the second division, Saïd Allik stated that it is an opportunity to inject new life into the team in order to gain control of Algerian football, also USM Alger disqualified in 2000 African Cup Winners' Cup to be punished not to participate in any African competition for one year because of the participation an ineligible of goalkeeper Burkinabé Siaka Coulibaly against JS du Ténéré. in the Algerian League Cup arrived to the semi-final round and lost to CR Belouizdad.

== Squad list ==
Players and squad numbers last updated on 15 June 2000.
Note: Flags indicate national team as has been defined under FIFA eligibility rules. Players may hold more than one non-FIFA nationality.

No.	Nat.	Position	Name	Date of Birth (Age)	Signed from	Apps.	Goals
Goalkeepers
-	(Algeria)	GK	Farid Belmellat	18 October 1970 (aged 29)	(Algeria) RC Kouba	0	0
-	(Algeria)	GK	Redouane Hamiti	16 January 1982 (aged 17)	(Algeria) IB Khémis El Khechna	0	0
-	(Algeria)	GK	Brahim Salaheddine	7 December 1975 (aged 24)	(Algeria) Hydra AC	0	0
-	(Burkina Faso)	GK	Siaka Coulibaly	10 March 1972 (aged 27)	(Burkina Faso) US Forces Armées	0	0
Defenders
3	(Algeria)	LB	Tarek Ghoul	6 January 1975 (aged 24)	(Algeria) USM El Harrach	0	0
-	(Algeria)	CB	Mounir Zeghdoud	18 November 1970 (aged 29)	(Algeria) USM Aïn Beïda	0	0
4	(Algeria)	CB	Fayçal Hamdani (C)	13 July 1970 (aged 29)	(Algeria) MC Alger	0	0
6	(Algeria)	LB / CB / RB	Mahieddine Meftah	25 September 1968 (aged 31)	(Algeria) JS Kabylie	0	0
2	(Algeria)	RB / CB	Mohamed Hamdoud	9 June 1976 (aged 23)	(Algeria) Youth system	0	0
5	(Algeria)	CB	Rabah Deghmani	5 October 1975 (aged 24)	(Algeria) IB Khémis El Khechna	0	0
14	(Algeria)	DF	Mohamed Khazrouni	18 March 1969 (aged 30)	(Algeria) USM Blida	0	0
	(Algeria)	DF	Foued Smati		(Algeria) Youth system	0	0
	(Algeria)	LB	Rachid Boumrar			0	0
Midfielders
-	(Algeria)		Farid Djahnine	16 August 1976 (aged 23)	(Algeria) Youth system	0	0
-	(Algeria)		Karim Ghazi	6 January 1979 (aged 20)	(Algeria) CR Belouizdad	0	0
-	(Algeria)		Hocine Achiou	27 April 1979 (aged 20)	(Algeria) Youth system	0	0
11	(Algeria)		Athmane Samir Amirat	5 November 1975 (aged 24)	(Algeria) USM El Harrach	0	0
	(Algeria)		Salaheddine Mehdaoui		(Algeria) USMM Hadjout	0	0
Forwards
17	(Algeria)		Tarek Hadj Adlane	11 January 1965 (aged 34)	(Saudi Arabia) Al Wehda	0	0
-	(Algeria)		Hamza Yacef	25 August 1979 (aged 20)	(Algeria) Youth system	0	0
-	(Nigeria)		Mohamed Manga	30 March 1977 (aged 22)		0	0
15	(Algeria)		Azzedine Rahim	31 March 1972 (aged 27)	(Algeria) Youth system	0	0
	(Algeria)		Khaled Lounici	9 July 1967 (aged 32)	(Algeria) USM El Harrach	0	0

== Competitions ==
=== Overview ===
Competition	Record								Started round	Final position / round	First match	Last match
Competition	G	W	D	L	GF	GA	GD	Win %	Started round	Final position / round	First match	Last match
Super Division	22	6	3	13	15	27	−12	27.27	—N/a	12th	14 October 1999	15 June 2000
Algerian Cup	3	2	1	0	4	1	+3	66.67	Round of 64	Round of 16	2 March 2000	15 May 2000
League Cup	12	3	5	4	15	12	+3	25.00	Group stage	Semi-final	23 December 1999	25 February 2000
CAF Cup	2	1	0	1	2	2	+0	50.00	Quarter-final		5 September 1999	17 September 1999
Cup Winners' Cup	2	1	1	0	2	1	+1	50.00	First round		19 March 2000	1 April 2000
Total	41	13	10	18	38	43	−5	31.71				

=== Super Division ===
==== League table ====
Pos	Team	Pld	W	D	L	GF	GA	GD	Pts
8	CA Batna	22	7	5	10	23	33	−10	26
9	USM Annaba	22	6	6	10	22	36	−14	24
10	JSM Béjaïa	22	6	5	11	16	24	−8	23
11	MC Alger	22	4	10	8	18	25	−7	22
12	USM Alger	22	6	3	13	15	27	−12	21

Source: rsssf
Rules for classification: 1) points; 2) head to head ; 3)goal difference; 4) number of goals scored.

==== Results summary ====
Overall								Home						Away					
Pld	W	D	L	GF	GA	GD	Pts	W	D	L	GF	GA	GD	W	D	L	GF	GA	GD
22	6	3	13	15	27	−12	21	5	3	3	12	9	+3	1	0	10	3	18	−15

Last updated: 30 January 2016.
Source: Competitive matches

==== Results by round ====
Round	1	2	3	4	5	6	7	8	9	10	11	12	13	14	15	16	17	18	19	20	21	22
Ground	H	A	H	A	H	A	H	A	H	H	A	A	H	A	H	A	H	A	H	A	A	H
Result	W	L	L	L	L	L	D	L	W	W	L	L	W	L	W	W	L	L	D	L	L	D
Position	2	8	9	8	11	11	11	11	11	10	11	12	11	12	11	9	10	12	11	12	12	12

Source: Competitive matches
A = Away; H = Home; W = Win; D = Draw; L = Loss

==== Matches ====
14 October 1999 Round 1	USM Alger	4–3	USM Annaba	Kouba
	Souilah 40'; Djahnine 42'; Hadj Adlane 44'; Amirat 67' Alane, Zeghdoud, Meftah, Hamdoud, Hamdani, Deghmani, Amirat, Khazrouni (substituted off) (Ghoul (substituted on) ), Djahnine, Souilah (substituted off) (Yacef (substituted on) ), Hadj Adlane (substituted off) (Rahim (substituted on) )	Report	Ouichaoui 32'; Fnides 57' (pen.), 72'	Stadium: Stade Omar Benhaddad; Referee: Touati Djaballah

21 October 1999 Round 2	MO Constantine	2–0	USM Alger	Constantine
	Houhou 14'; Kaci-Saïd 50' Bensahnoun, Bouaicha, Boughandoura, Kerboua, Akriche, Belouar, Kerrache, Khellaf (substituted off) (Soltani (substituted on) ), Houhou, Benrabah, Kaci Said (substituted off) (Daoud (substituted on) )	Report	Alane, Hamdoud, Hamdani (c), Deghmani, Zeghdoud, Meftah, Hadj Adlane, Khazrouni, Djehnine (substituted off) (Ghoul (substituted on) ), Yacef, Amirat (substituted off) (Souilah (substituted on) )	Stadium: Stade Mohamed Hamlaoui; Referee: Karim Dahou; Assistant referees: Boudrabli, Ghanem

28 October 1999 Round 3	USM Alger	0–1	CR Belouizdad	Algiers
	Alane, Hamdoud, Khazrouni, Hamdani (c), Deghmani, Zeghdoud, Meftah, Hadj Adlane (substituted off) 60' (Yacef (substituted on) 60'), Djehnine, Lounici (substituted off) 87' (Souilah (substituted on) 87'), Amirat (substituted off) 80' (Mehdaoui (substituted on) 80')	Report	90' Settara Mahrez, Fatahine, Chedeba, Bounekdja, Selmi, Bakhti, Talis, Mezouar, Ali Moussa (substituted off) 75' (Settara (substituted on) 75'), Badji (substituted off) 84' (Hechaïchi (substituted on) 84'), Boutaleb	Stadium: Stade 5 Juillet 1962; Referee: Kamel Berber; Assistant referees: Djezzar, Achrouf

1 November 1999 Round 4	JS Kabylie	1–0	USM Alger	Tizi Ouzou
	Moussouni 42'	Report		Stadium: Stade 1er Novembre 1954

4 November 1999 Round 5	USM Alger	0–1	MC Alger	Algiers
	Alane, Hamdoud (substituted off) 86' (Ghazi (substituted on) 86'), Ghoul, Hamdani, Zeghdoud, Meftah, Lounici, Djahnine, Doghmani, Rahim (substituted off) 46' (Yacef (substituted on) 46'), Amirat (substituted off) 60' (Mehdaoui (substituted on) 60')	Report	55' Benzerga Hamened, Slatni, Benzerga, Ouahid, Lazizi, Meraga, Dob, Baazouz (substituted off) 68' (Diab (substituted on) 68'), Azizène, Benali (substituted off) 85' (Aid (substituted on) 85'), Rahmouni (substituted off) 78'} (Khenouf (substituted on) 78')	Stadium: Stade 5 Juillet 1962; Referee: Bendada; Assistant referees: Sedrati, Talbi

18 November 1999 Round 6	ES Sétif	2–1	USM Alger	Sétif
	Derbal (yellow card) 26'; Fellahi 38', 67' Belhani, Derbal, Kamli, Deboucha, Bendris, Mahdaoui, (substituted off) 76' (Bouzidi (substituted on) 76'), Badache (substituted off) 51' (Khaled (substituted on) 51'), Madoui, Fellahi, Mattem, Bourahli, (substituted off) 85' (Kheddara (substituted on) 85')	Report	Amirat (yellow card) 14'; Zeghdoud (yellow card) 71'; Ghoul 75'; Yacef (yellow card) 77'; Achiou (yellow card) 78' Salah-Eddine, Hamdoud, Ghoul, Hamdani, Zaghdoud (substituted off) 85' (Boumrar (substituted on) 85'), Doghmani, Mahdaoui, Lounici, Khazrouni (substituted off) 46' (Achiou (substituted on) 46') Rahim (substituted off) 68' (Yacef (substituted on) 68')	Stadium: Stade 8 Mai 1945; Referee: Noureddine Lacarne; Assistant referees: Belkakroun, Allam

25 November 1999 Round 7	USM Alger	1–1	WA Tlemcen	Algiers
	Rahim 35' (pen.) Salah-Eddine, Hamdoud, Ghoul, Hamdani, Zaghdoud, Djahnine, Yacef (substituted off) (Achiou (substituted on) ), Lounici, Khazrouni (substituted off) (Hadj Adlane (substituted on) (substituted off) , Ghazi (substituted on) ) Rahim, Amirat	Report	Fares El-Aouni 40' Mezaïr, Kheris, Yadel, Hebri (substituted off) (Kerdoussi (substituted on) ), Kherbouche, Loukili, Boudjakdji, Daoud, Farés (substituted off) (Aïdara (substituted on) ), Dahleb, Meziane	Stadium: Stade Omar Hammadi; Referee: Zaki Lahmar; Assistant referees: chérif, khelifatni

2 December 1999 Round 8	MC Oran	1–0	USM Alger	Oran
	Zerrouki 17' Benabdellah, Kechamli, Haddou, Mazri, Kadda, Cherif El Ouazzani (c), Boukessassa, Zerrouki, Meçabih (substituted off) 89' (Moumen (substituted on) 89'), Meguenni, Mechri (substituted off) 84' (Gaïd (substituted on) 84')	Report	Alane, Hamdoud, Doghmani (substituted off) 46' (Smati (substituted on) 46'), Hamdani, Zeghdoud (c), Meftah, Yacef (substituted off) 53' (Rahim (substituted on) 53'), Djahnine, Khazrouni (substituted off) 83' (Ghazi (substituted on) 83'), Achiou, Amirat	Stadium: Stade Ahmed Zabana; Referee: Salim Oussaci; Assistant referees: Debbich, Saker

6 December 1999 Round 9	USM Alger	1–0	JSM Bejaïa	Algiers
	Amirat 5'	[ Report]		Stadium: Stade Omar Hammadi

9 December 1999 Round 10	USM Alger	2–1	USM Blida	Algiers
	Meftah 50' (pen.); Rahim 80' Allane, Hamdoud, Ghoul, Hamdani (substituted off) 83' (Doghmani (substituted on) 83'), Zeghdoud, Meftah, Yacef, Djahnine, Smati, Achiou (substituted off) 57' (Rahim (substituted on) 57'), Amirat, (substituted off) 90' (Ghazi (substituted on) 90')	Report	Zouani 84' Haniched, Krebaza, Mameri, Amrouche (substituted off) 46' (Tizarouine (substituted on) 46'), Galoul, Derriche (substituted off) 77' (Mehdaoui (substituted on) 77'), Harkas, Sloukia, Kherkhache, Djeddou (substituted off) 46' (Aït Belkacem (substituted on) 46'), Zouani B	Stadium: Stade Omar Hammadi; Referee: Touati Djaballah; Assistant referees: Bettahar, Ould Bakir

16 December 1999 Round 11	CA Batna	4–0	USM Alger	Batna
	Koulib 52'; Dob 68', 80'; Mezedjri 79'	[ Report]		Stadium: Stade Seffouhi

9 March 2000 Round 12	USM Annaba	1–0	USM Alger	Annaba
		Report		Stadium: Stade 19 Mai 1956

24 March 2000 Round 13	USM Alger	2–0	MO Constantine	Algiers
	Amirat 2'; Tadji 44'	Report		Stadium: Stade Omar Hammadi

14 April 2000 Round 14	CR Belouizdad	1–0	USM Alger	Algiers
	Badji 87' Mahrez, Talis (substituted off) (Fatahine (substituted on) ), Chedba (substituted off) (Saïbi (substituted on) ), Bounakdja (substituted off) (Maâchi (substituted on) ), Selmi, Bakhti, Setara, Boutaleb, Ali Moussa, Mezouar, Badji	Report	Benmellat, Boumrar, Khazrouni, Hamdani, Ghoul, Meftah, Djahnine, Amirat, Ghazi (substituted off) (Smati (substituted on) ), Rahim, Achiou (substituted off) (Yacef (substituted on) )	Stadium: Stade 5 Juillet 1962; Referee: Mohamed Zekrini; Assistant referees: Mazari, Benrahmane

24 April 2000 Round 15	USM Alger	1–0	JS Kabylie	Algiers
	Amirat 57' (pen.) Belmellat, Hamdoud, Ghoul, Hamdani (c), Djahnine, Meftah, Abacha (substituted off) 77' (Manga (substituted on) 77'), Boumrar, Yacef, Rahim (substituted off) 73' (Hadj Adlane (substituted on) 73'), Amirat	Report	Boughrara, Raho, Benhemlat, Driouèche, Zafour, Selmoune, Moussouni (substituted off) 88' (Okacha (substituted on) 88'), Nazef, Gacemi, Boubrit (substituted off) 68' (Aït Kaci (substituted on) 68'), Meddane (c) (substituted off) 68' (Meghraoui (substituted on) 68')	Stadium: Stade Omar Hammadi; Referee: Kamel Berber; Assistant referees: Djezzar, Achrouf

11 May 2000 Round 16	MC Alger	0–1	USM Alger	Boumerdès
	Hamenad, Slatni, Benhamlat, Lazizi, Meraga, Ouahid, Dib, Bazoz (substituted off) (Azzouz (substituted on) ), Azizènene (substituted off) (Boutine (substituted on) ), Djender (substituted off) (Bélaïd (substituted on) ), Benzerga	Report	Abacha 16' Benmellat (substituted off) (Salah Eddine (substituted on) ), Hamdoud, Ghoul, Hamdani, Meftah, Djahnine, Abacha, Khazrouni (substituted off) (Ghazi (substituted on) ), Yacef, Rahim (substituted off) ((Hadj Adlane (substituted on) ), Amirat	Stadium: Stade Djillali Bounâama; Referee: Noureddine Lacarne; Assistant referees: Belfekroune, Allane

18 May 2000 Round 17	USM Alger	1–2	ES Sétif	Algiers
	Yacef 58' (pen.) Salaheddine, Hamdoud, Boumrar, Hamdani (c), Briki, Djahnine (substituted off) 74' (Tadji (substituted on) 74'), Hadj Adlane, Doghmani, Manga (substituted off) 52' (Yacef (substituted on) 52'), Ghazi, Amirat	Report	Rahmouni 33', 40' Belhani, Reggad, Khesrani, Deboucha, Bouzidi (substituted off) 67' (Khedara (substituted on) 67'), Mehdaoui, Guennifi Z. (substituted off) 73' (Guennifi A. (substituted on) 73'), Zorgane (c), Fellahi (substituted off) 29' (Rahmouni (substituted on) 29'), Mattem, Bourahli	Stadium: Stade Omar Hammadi; Referee: Brahim Seghir; Assistant referees: Keraï, Haimoudi

18 May 2000 Round 18	WA Tlemcen	3–0	USM Alger	Tlemcen
	Hachemi 18' (pen.); Daoud 43', 49' Mezaïr, Kerris, Yadel, Habri (substituted off) 73' (Kendouci (substituted on) 73'), Kherbouche, Loukili, Boudjakdji, Hachemi, Farès (substituted off) 62' (Aïdara (substituted on) 62'), Dahleb (substituted off) 82' (Meziani (substituted on) 82'), Daoud	Report	Allane, Hamdoud, Ghoul, Doghmane, Briki, Meftah, Hadj Adlane (substituted off) 84' (Boumakhlouf (substituted on) 84'), Abacha (substituted off) (Tadji (substituted on) ), Smati (substituted off) 54' (Amirat (substituted on) 54'), Ghazi, Yacef	Stadium: Stade Akid Lotfi; Referee: Djamel Eddine Benchenâa; Assistant referees: Bourayou, Chadli

29 May 2000 Round 19	USM Alger	0–0	MC Oran	Algiers
		Report		Stadium: Stade Omar Hammadi

1 June 2000 Round 20	JSM Bejaïa	1–0	USM Alger	Bejaïa
	Djilani 68' (pen.) Nouioua, Issaâd (substituted off) 57' (Amaouche H. (substituted on) 57'), Djilani, Aouamer, Karouf, Boudehoucha, Berrahou (substituted off) 79' (Amari (substituted on) 79'), Doudène (substituted off) 64' (Begredj (substituted on) 64'), Benamokrane, Hamiti, Ould Rabah	Report	Alane, Hamdoud, Boumrar, Hamdani, Briki, Khazrouni, Tadji (substituted off) 73' (Hadj Adlane (substituted on) 73'), Doghmani, Smati (substituted off) 89' (Manga (substituted on) 89'), Rahim, Yacef	Stadium: Stade de l'Unité Maghrébine; Referee: Chawki Mouellef; Assistant referees: Klifatni, Arribi

12 June 2000 Round 21	USM Blida	2–1	USM Alger	Blida
	Djeddou 30'; Kherkhache 64' Haniched, Krebaza, Zane, Tizarouine, Galoul, Harkas, Aït Tahar, Aït Belkacem, Kherkhache, Djeddou, Zouani	Report	Manga 59' Alane, Hamdoud, Boumrar, Hamdani, Doghmani, Djehnine, Yacef, Khazrouni, Smati (substituted off) 77' (Ghoul (substituted on) 77'), Rahim (substituted off) 70' (Tadji (substituted on) 70'), Manga	Stadium: Stade Frères Brakni; Referee: Samir Boubakour; Assistant referees: Menana, Lamini

15 June 2000 Round 22	USM Alger	0–0	CA Batna	Algiers
		[ Report]		Stadium: Stade Omar Hammadi

=== Algerian Cup ===
2 March 2000 Round of 64	GC Mascara	0–2	USM Alger	Mostaganem
14:00		Report	Meftah 5'; Yacef 65' Benmellat, hamdoud, Boumrar, Hamdani, Briki, Meftah, Yacef (substituted off) 78' (Rahim (substituted on) 78'), Tadji (substituted off) 75' (Abacha (substituted on) 75'), Achiou, Ghazi, Amirat	Stadium: Stade Mohamed Bensaïd; Referee: Djamel Eddine Benchenâa; Assistant referees: Chadli, Bourayou

8 May 2000 Round of 32	USM El Harrach	0–1	USM Alger	Algiers
15:00			Hadj Adlane 15' Salah Eddine, Ghoul, Hamdani, Hamdoud, Meftah, Boumrar, Hadj Adlane, Khazrouni, Ghazi, Yacef, Abacha (substituted off) (Tadji (substituted on) )	Stadium: Stade du 5 Juillet; Referee: Salim Oussaci; Assistant referees: Sakir, Debich

15 May 2000 Round of 16	USM Alger	1–1 (a.e.t.) (4–2 p)	USM Blida	Algiers
15:00	Meftah 44'		Zouani 27'	Stadium: Stade du 5 Juillet

=== League Cup ===
==== Group stage ====
Team	Pld	W	D	L	GF	GA	GD	Pts
RC Kouba	9	4	2	3	11	11	0	14
MC Alger	9	3	4	2	11	10	+1	13
USM Alger	8	3	3	2	11	9	+2	12
USM Blida	9	2	4	3	10	14	−4	10
JS Kabylie	9	1	5	3	6	8	−2	8

23 December 1999 1	USM Alger	2–2	USM Blida	Algiers
16:00	Ghazi 38' (yellow card) 38'; Yacef 62' Salah Eddine, Hamdoud (substituted off) 81' (Boumrar, (substituted on) 81'), Ghoul, Hamdani (c), Deghmani, Khazrouni, Djehnine, Yacef, Achiou, Ghazi (substituted off) 81' (Smati, (substituted on) 81'), Amirat	Report	Mehdaoui 23'; Billal Zouani 56' Haniched, Galoul (substituted off) 60' (Harkas, (substituted on) 60'), Mameri, Tizarouine, Fatahine, Derriche, Mehdaoui, Sloukia, Aït Tahar (substituted off) 59' (Kherkhache, (substituted on) 59'), Aït Belkacecm (substituted off) 86' (Djeddou, (substituted on) 86'), Billal Zouani	Stadium: Stade Omar Hammadi; Referee: Mehdi Abdi; Assistant referees: Zine, Guemaz

30 December 1999 2	NA Hussein Dey	2–4	USM Alger	Hussein Dey
16:00				Stadium: Stade Frères Zioui
Note: Lineup for USM Alger - - Coach Rabah Saâdane

3 January 2000 3	USM Alger	1–1	USM El Harrach	Algiers
16:00				Stadium: Stade Omar Hammadi
Note: Lineup for USM Alger - - Coach Rabah Saâdane

13 January 2000 4	CR Belouizdad	(w/o) (Note: The FAF will not impose any sanctions on the CR Belouizdad, given the exceptional circumstances for which they have declared forfeiture. Moreover, that would have had no impact on the ranking as both this team and the USM Alger are all qualified.)	USM Alger	Algiers
16:00				Stadium: Stade 20 Août 1955

20 January 2000 5	USM Alger	1–1	JSM Béjaïa	Algiers
16:00				Stadium: Stade Omar Hammadi

24 January 2000 6	RC Kouba	2–0	USM Alger	Kouba
16:00				Stadium: Stade Omar Benhaddad

27 January 2000 7	USM Alger	2–0	JS Bordj Ménaïel	Algiers
16:00				Stadium: Stade Omar Hammadi

31 January 2000 8	USM Alger	0–1	MC Alger	Algiers
16:00			Mounir Dob 61'	Stadium: Stade du 5 Juillet

3 February 2000 9	JS Kabylie	0–1	USM Alger	Tizi Ouzou
16:00				Stadium: Stade du 1er Novembre 1954
Note: Lineup for USM Alger - - Coach Rabah Saâdane

==== Knockout stage ====
10 February 2000 Round of 16	USM Alger	0–0 (3–1 p)	ES Sétif	Béjaïa
13:30				Stadium: Stade de l'Unité Maghrébine
Note: Lineup for USM Alger - - Coach Rabah Saâdane.

17 February 2000 Quarter-finals	USM Alger	1–1 (a.e.t.) (3–1 p)	USM El Harrach	Algiers
14:00	Meftah 81'		45' Djebbar	Stadium: Stade du 5 Juillet 1962
Note: Lineup for USM Alger - - Coach Rabah Saâdane.

25 February 2000 Semi-finals	CR Belouizdad	2–1	USM Alger	Algiers
15:00	Galoul 35'; Settara 57' Mahrez, Talis, Chedeba, Maâchi, Selmi, Bekhti, Setara, Mezouar, Galoul, Badji, Boutaleb.	Report	Amirat 83' Coulibaly, Boumrar, Khazrouni, Hamdani, Briki, Meftah, Abacha (substituted off) (Tadji (substituted on) ), Djahnine, Achiou, Ghazi (substituted off) (Rahim (substituted on) ), Amirat - Coach Rabah Saâdane.	Stadium: Stade du 5 Juillet 1962; Referee: Mohamed Youbi

=== CAF Cup ===
==== Quarter-finals ====
5 September 1999 First leg	Wydad Casablanca (Morocco)	1–0	(Algeria) USM Alger	Casablanca, Morocco
15:30	Jawed Bounabet 7'	Report		Stadium: Stade Père Jégo
Note: Lineup for USM Alger - , , , , , , , , , , - Coach Rabah Saâdane.

17 September 1999 Second leg	USM Alger (Algeria)	2–1	(Morocco) Wydad Casablanca	Algiers, Algeria
16:00	Amirat 11'; Hadj Adlane 33' (pen.) Alane, Zeghdoud (C), Khazrouni, Deghmani, Hamdoud, Meftah, Smati, Djahnine, Souilah, Amirat, Hadj Adlane - Coach Rabah Saâdane.	Report	Allali 90+3'	Stadium: Stade du 5 Juillet 1962; Referee: Abdelhalim Redouane (Egypt)

=== African Cup Winners' Cup ===
==== First round ====
19 March 2000 first leg	JS du Ténéré (Niger)	1–1	(Algeria) USM Alger	Niamey, Niger
16:00	Yataga 82'		Abacha 35'	Stadium: Général Seyni Kountché Stadion; Referee: ? (Mali)
Note: Lineup for USM Alger - - Coach Rabah Saâdane.

31 March 2000 Second leg	USM Alger (Algeria)	1–0	(Niger) JS du Ténéré	Bologhine, Algeria
16:00	Rahim (yellow card) 75'; Khazrouni 82' Salah Eddine, Djahnine, Hamdani (c), Briki, Meftah, Hadj Adlane (substituted off) 72' (Rahim (substituted on) 72') Aïchiou (substituted off) 65' (Khazrouni (substituted on) 65'), Ghazi (substituted off) 46' (Tadji (substituted on) 46'), Amirat, Hamdoud, Boumrar - Coach: Rabah Saâdane	Report	Abdelatif H’Rikou (yellow card) 74' Comlane Moussa, Abdelatif Issoufrur, Harouna Issobo (substituted off) 58' (Mounchougui (substituted on) 58'), Abdoulatif H’Rikou, Aboubakar Saïdou, El-Hassan Ismaïl, Didi Frank (substituted off) 86' (Boubakar Slifo (substituted on) 86'), Ayabe Aïkito (substituted off) 86' (Sonmalya Ali Moussa (substituted on) 86'), Ibrahima Aboubakar, N’guimi Nana	Stadium: Stade Omar Hammadi; Referee: Attaf Yakoubi (Tunisia)

== Squad information ==
=== Appearances and goals ===
No.	Pos	Player	Nat	Super Division			Algerian Cup			League Cup			CAF Cup			Cup Winners' Cup			Total		
No.	Pos	Player	Nat	App	St	G	App	St	G	App	St	G	App	St	G	App	St	G	App	St	G
Goalkeepers
	GK	Farid Belmellat	(Algeria)	0	0	0	0	0	0	0	0	0	0	0	0	0	0	0	0	0	0
	GK	Brahim Salaheddine	(Algeria)	0	0	0	0	0	0	0	0	0	0	0	0	0	0	0	0	0	0
	GK	Siaka Coulibaly	(Burkina Faso)	0	0	0	0	0	0	0	0	0	0	0	0	0	0	0	0	0	0
	GK	Abderrahmane Alane	(Algeria)	0	0	0	0	0	0	0	0	0	0	0	0	0	0	0	0	0	0
Defenders
	DF	Tarek Ghoul	(Algeria)	0	0	0	0	0	0	0	0	0	0	0	0	0	0	0	0	0	0
	DF	Mounir Zeghdoud	(Algeria)	0	0	0	0	0	0	0	0	0	0	0	0	0	0	0	0	0	0
	DF	Fayçal Hamdani	(Algeria)	0	0	0	0	0	0	0	0	0	0	0	0	0	0	0	0	0	0
	DF	Mahieddine Meftah	(Algeria)	0	0	0	0	0	0	0	0	0	0	0	0	0	0	0	0	0	0
	DF	Mohamed Hamdoud	(Algeria)	0	0	0	0	0	0	0	0	0	0	0	0	0	0	0	0	0	0
	DF	Rabah Deghmani	(Algeria)	0	0	0	0	0	0	0	0	0	0	0	0	0	0	0	0	0	0
	DF	Mohamed Briki	(Algeria)	0	0	0	0	0	0	0	0	0	0	0	0	0	0	0	0	0	0
	DF	Mohamed Khazrouni	(Algeria)	0	0	0	0	0	0	0	0	0	0	0	0	0	0	0	0	0	0
	DF	Fouad Smati	(Algeria)	0	0	0	0	0	0	0	0	0	0	0	0	0	0	0	0	0	0
	DF	Boumakhlouf	(Algeria)	0	0	0	0	0	0	0	0	0	0	0	0	0	0	0	0	0	0
Midfielders
	MF	Farid Djahnine	(Algeria)	0	0	0	0	0	0	0	0	0	0	0	0	0	0	0	0	0	0
	MF	Karim Ghazi	(Algeria)	0	0	0	0	0	0	0	0	0	0	0	0	0	0	0	0	0	0
	MF	Hocine Achiou	(Algeria)	0	0	0	0	0	0	0	0	0	0	0	0	0	0	0	0	0	0
	MF	Athmane Samir Amirat	(Algeria)	0	0	0	0	0	0	0	0	0	0	0	0	0	0	0	0	0	0
	MF	Salaheddine Mehdaoui	(Algeria)	0	0	0	0	0	0	0	0	0	0	0	0	0	0	0	0	0	0
	MF	Beghdad Tadji	(Algeria)	0	0	0	0	0	0	0	0	0	0	0	0	0	0	0	0	0	0
	MF	Rachid Boumrar	(Algeria)	0	0	0	0	0	0	0	0	0	0	0	0	0	0	0	0	0	0
	MF	Mohamed Abacha	(Algeria)	0	0	0	0	0	0	0	0	0	0	0	0	0	0	0	0	0	0
Forwards
	FW	Tarek Hadj Adlane	(Algeria)	0	0	0	0	0	0	0	0	0	0	0	0	0	0	0	0	0	0
	FW	Hamza Yacef	(Algeria)	0	0	0	0	0	0	0	0	0	0	0	0	0	0	0	0	0	0
	FW	Mohamed Manga	(Nigeria)	0	0	0	0	0	0	0	0	0	0	0	0	0	0	0	0	0	0
	FW	Azzedine Rahim	(Algeria)	0	0	0	0	0	0	0	0	0	0	0	0	0	0	0	0	0	0
	FW	Souilah	(Algeria)	0	0	0	0	0	0	0	0	0	0	0	0	0	0	0	0	0	0
	FW	Hamdaoui	(Algeria)	0	0	0	0	0	0	0	0	0	0	0	0	0	0	0	0	0	0
	FW	Khaled Lounici	(Algeria)	0	0	0	0	0	0	0	0	0	0	0	0	0	0	0	0	0	0
Total				22		15	3		4	12		15	2		2	2		2	41		38

=== Goalscorers ===
Includes all competitive matches. The list is sorted alphabetically by surname when total goals are equal.

No.	Nat.	Player	Pos.	L 1	AC	LC	C2	C3	TOTAL
11	(Algeria)	Athmane Samir Amirat	MF	4	0	1	0	1	6
6	(Algeria)	Mahieddine Meftah	DF	1	2	0	0	0	3
17	(Algeria)	Tarek Hadj Adlane	FW	1	1	0	0	1	3
?	(Algeria)	Hamza Yacef	FW	1	1	1	0	0	3
15	(Algeria)	Azzedine Rahim	FW	2	0	0	0	0	2
?	(Algeria)	Mohamed Abacha	MF	1	0	0	1	0	2
?	(Algeria)	Farid Djahnine	MF	1	0	0	0	0	1
3	(Algeria)	Tarek Ghoul	DF	1	0	0	0	0	1
?	(Nigeria)	Mohamed Manga	MF	1	0	0	0	0	1
14	(Algeria)	Mohamed Khazrouni	DF	0	0	0	1	0	1
?	(Algeria)	Beghdad Tadji		1	0	0	0	0	1
?	(Algeria)	Souilah		1	0	0	0	0	1
?	(Algeria)	Karim Ghazi	MF	0	0	1	0	0	1
Own Goals				0	0	0	0	0	0
Totals				15	4	13	2	2	34

=== Clean sheets ===
Includes all competitive matches.

No.	Nat	Name	SD 1	AC	LC	C2	C3	Total
	(Algeria)	Farid Belmellat	2	1	0	0	0	3
	(Algeria)	Brahim Salah Eddine	0	1	0	1	0	2
	(Burkina Faso)	Siaka Coulibaly	0	0	0	0	0	0
	(Algeria)	Abderrahmane Alane	0	0	0	0	0	0
		TOTALS	6	2	3	1	0	12

== Transfers ==
=== Out ===
Date	Pos	Player	To club	Transfer fee	Source
1999	MF	(Algeria) Hamid Aït Belkacem	USM Blida	Free transfer	
1999	MF	(Algeria) Samir Sloukia	USM Blida	Free transfer	
