= 1998–99 USM Alger season =

USM Alger
1998–99 season
- President: Saïd Allik
- Head coach: Mustapha Aksouh; Said Hadj Mansour (until ?); Nour Benzekri; Ahmed Aït El-Hocine (from ?)
- Stadium: Stade Omar Hammadi
- Super Division: 4th
- Algerian Cup: Winners
- CAF Cup: Quarter-finals
- Top goalscorer: League: Tarek Hadj Adlane (8 goals); All: Tarek Hadj Adlane (12 goals)

In the 1998–99 season, USM Alger is competing in the Super Division for the 19th time, as well as the Algerian Cup. It is their 4th consecutive season in the top flight of Algerian football. They will be competing in Ligue 1 and the Algerian Cup. In 1998–99 Algerian Cup against JS Kabylie, the two teams met for the first time in the final of the Algerian Cup at Stade 5 Juillet 1962 and in the first final to be attended by the new president of the country Abdelaziz Bouteflika and ended with the victory of USM Alger with two goals record by Billel Dziri and the former player in JS Kabylie Tarek Hadj Adlane To be the fourth Cup of USMA, Before that in the Semi-finals against MC Alger, there was a great controversy over the way the game was played, where it was supposed to play from two games, but the Ministry of Youth and Sports decided to play the two games in Stade du 5 Juillet, Saïd Allik President of USMA, refused this insisting that each team plays in his stadium and Stade du 5 Juillet, he was the official stadium of MC Alger, after which the Minister of Youth and Sports Mohamed Aziz Derouaz rejected this request and insisted that he play on Stade du 5 Juillet for security reasons. On the day of the match, USM Alger went to Omar Hamadi Stadium and MC Alger and the referees to Stade du 5 Juillet. Minister of the Interior and Local Authorities at that time Abdelmalek Sellal called Allik to find a solution to this problem, His response was that there were two solutions the first is that each team plays in its stadium Or hold one game in a neutral stadium, and Allik proposes Stade du 19 Mai 1956 in Annaba, but because of the black decade and since both of them are from the capital, it was decided to hold it in Stade du 5 Juillet.

== Squad list ==
Players and squad numbers last updated on 8 January 1999.
Note: Flags indicate national team as has been defined under FIFA eligibility rules. Players may hold more than one non-FIFA nationality.

No.	Nat.	Position	Name	Date of birth (age)	Signed from
Goalkeepers
1	(Algeria)	GK	Abderrahmane Allane	23 May 1970 (aged 28)	(Algeria) WA Boufarik
-	(Algeria)	GK	Redouane Hamiti	16 January 1982 (aged 16)	(Algeria) IB Khémis El Khechna
-	(Algeria)	GK	Farid Belmellat	18 October 1970 (aged 28)	(Algeria) RC Kouba
Defenders
	(Algeria)	LB	Tarek Ghoul	6 January 1975 (aged 23)	(Algeria) USM El Harrach
5	(Algeria)	CB	Mounir Zeghdoud	18 November 1970 (aged 28)	(Algeria) USM Aïn Beïda
4	(Algeria)	RB	Fayçal Hamdani (C)	13 July 1970 (aged 28)	(Algeria) MC Alger
6	(Algeria)	LB / CB / RB	Mahieddine Meftah	25 September 1968 (aged 30)	(Algeria) JS Kabylie
2	(Algeria)	RB / CB	Mohamed Hamdoud	9 June 1976 (aged 22)	Youth system
	(Algeria)	DF	Foued Smati	2 December 1975 (aged 23)	Youth system
	(Algeria)	LB	Rachid Boumrar		
Midfielders
3	(Algeria)	MF	Farid Djahnine	16 August 1976 (aged 22)	Youth system
-	(Algeria)	DM	Karim Ghazi	6 January 1979 (aged 19)	(Algeria) CR Belouizdad
	(Algeria)	CM	Billel Dziri	21 January 1972 (aged 26)	(Tunisia) Étoile Sportive du Sahel
-	(Algeria)	AM	Hocine Achiou	27 April 1979 (aged 19)	Youth system
-	(Algeria)	CM	Mohamed Abacha	9 July 1978 (aged 20)	Youth system
	(Algeria)	CM	Salaheddine Mehdaoui		(Algeria) USMM Hadjout
	(Algeria)	MF	Samir Sloukia		
11	(Algeria)	CM	Athmane Samir Amirat	5 November 1975 (aged 23)	(Algeria) USM El Harrach
Forwards
7	(Algeria)	ST	Tarek Hadj Adlane	11 January 1965 (aged 33)	(Saudi Arabia) Al Wehda
10	(Algeria)	LW / RW / SS	Hamza Yacef	25 August 1979 (aged 19)	Youth system
12	(Nigeria)	RW	Mohamed Manga	30 March 1977 (aged 21)	(Nigeria)
15	(Algeria)	ST	Azzedine Rahim	31 March 1972 (aged 26)	Youth system
	(Algeria)	FW	Nacer Zekri	3 August 1971 (aged 27)	(Algeria) NA Hussein Dey

== Competitions ==
=== Overview ===
Competition	Record								Started round	Final position / round	First match	Last match
Competition	G	W	D	L	GF	GA	GD	Win %	Started round	Final position / round	First match	Last match
Super Division	26	12	8	6	32	16	+16	46.15	—N/a	4th	14 September 1998	24 May 1999
Algerian Cup	7	5	1	1	16	3	+13	71.43	Round of 64	Winners	4 March 1999	1 July 1999
CAF Cup	4	3	0	1	11	4	+7	75.00	First Round	Second round	14 March 1999	16 May 1999
Total	37	20	9	8	59	23	+36	54.05				

=== Super Division ===
==== League table ====
Group B
Pos	Team	Pld	W	D	L	GF	GA	GD	Pts	Qualification or relegation
2	CR Belouizdad (Q)	26	16	5	5	44	22	+22	53	play-offs for the Arab Cup
3	WA Tlemcen	26	15	5	6	40	17	+23	50	
4	USM Alger (Q)	26	12	8	6	32	17	+15	44	2000 African Cup Winners' Cup
5	MC Oran	26	12	7	7	44	25	+19	43	
6	USM Blida	26	12	6	8	27	27	0	42	

Source: rsssf
Rules for classification: 1) points; 2) goal difference; 3) number of goals scored.
(Q) Qualified for the phase indicated

==== Results summary ====
Overall								Home						Away					
Pld	W	D	L	GF	GA	GD	Pts	W	D	L	GF	GA	GD	W	D	L	GF	GA	GD
26	12	8	6	32	16	+16	44	8	5	0	22	6	+16	4	3	6	10	10	0

Last updated: 30 January 2016.
Source: Competitive matches

==== Results by round ====
Round	1	2	3	4	5	6	7	8	9	10	11	12	13	14	15	16	17	18	19	20	21	22	23	24	25	26
Ground	A	A	H	A	H	A	H	A	H	A	H	A	H	H	H	A	H	A	H	A	H	A	H	A	H	A
Result	W	L	D	D	W	L	D	L	W	W	W	L	W	W	W	W	W	D	D	D	W	W	D	L	D	L
Position																					4					4

Source: Competitive matches
A = Away; H = Home; W = Win; D = Draw; L = Loss

==== Matches ====
14 September 1998 Round 1	WA Boufarik	0–1	USM Alger	Boufarik
13:00	Belachebi (yellow card) 18'; Mebrouk (yellow card) 31'; Madjour (yellow card) 62'; Cheblaoui (red card) 88'	Report	Hamdoud (yellow card) 28'; R.Zouani 53' (yellow card) 63'; Meftah (yellow card) 56'	Stadium: Stade Mohamed Reggaz; Referee: Bendada, Belbordj, Dani
Note: Lineup for USM Alger - - Coach Aksouh & Hadj Mansour; Lineup for WA Boufarik - - Coach Bouhallel & Belaikous

21 September 1998 Round 2	ASM Oran	1–0	USM Alger	Oran
14:00	Faradji 77' Bellouti, Raho, Benmerine, Bouha (c), Farradji, Belarouci, Mosbah, Benzerga (substituted off) 89' (Zeddour, (substituted on) 89'), Bendida (substituted off) 66' (Benyoub, (substituted on) 66'), Benchergui (substituted off) 81' (El-Koutri, (substituted on) 81'). - Coach: Amrane Abdelkader	Report	Allane, Hamdoud, Djahnine, Tizarouine, Zeghdoud, Meftah, Amirat (substituted off) 62' (Zouani, (substituted on) 62'), Hamdani (c), Mahdaoui, Ait Belkacem (substituted off) 52' (Zekri, (substituted on) 52'), Khouni. - Coach: Aksouh & Hadj Mansour	Stadium: Habib Bouakeul Stadium; Referee: Djamel Eddine Benchenâa; Assistant referees: Chadli, Arribi

25 September 1998 Round 3	USM Alger	0–0	USM Blida	Bologhine
14:30	Meftah (yellow card) 54'; Zeghdoud (yellow card) 60' Allane, Hamdoud, Ghoul, Hamdani (c), Zeghdoud, Meftah, Hadj Adlane, Djahnine, Manga, Réda Zouani (substituted off) 71' (Amirat, (substituted on) 71'), Khouni (substituted off) 46' (Zekri, (substituted on) 46') - Coach: Aksouh & Hadj Mansour	Report	Harkès (yellow card) 32'; Krebazza (yellow card) 40'; Zane (yellow card) 62'; Khazrouni (yellow card) 71' Haniched, Krebaza, Amrouche, Galoul, Zane (c), Khazrouni, Billal Zouani (substituted off) 88' (Dagno, (substituted on) 88'), Boughrab, Laassakeur, Belaiter (substituted off) 71' (Mekhtiche, (substituted on) 71'), Harkès - Coach: Noureddine Saâdi	Stadium: Omar Hamadi Stadium; Referee: Segheir; Assistant referees: Chetouane, Tourbane

8 October 1998 Round 4	SA Mohammadia	0–0	USM Alger	Mohammadia
				Stadium: Stade Mohamed Ouali

15 October 1998 Round 5	USM Alger	1–0	RC Kouba	Bologhine
	Hamid Aït Belkacem 82'			Stadium: Omar Hamadi Stadium

22 October 1998 Round 6	ES Mostaganem	1–0	USM Alger	Mostaganem
	Mokadem 16'			Stadium: Stade Mohamed Bensaïd

9 November 1998 Round 7	USM Alger	2–2	MC Alger	Algiers
15:00	Hadj Adlane 17'; Hamdoud 83' Belmelat, Hamdoud, Ghoul, Hamdani (c), Zeghdoud, Meftah, Hadj Adlane, Djahnine, Mehdaoui, Ait Belkacem, Sloukia - Coach: Aksouh Mustapha & Hadj Mansour Saïd	Report	Saïfi 60'; Gacemi 74' Hamened, Slatni Yacine, Benhamlat Hakim, Nechad, Lazizi, Derriche Abdellatif, Saifi, Dob Fodil (Gasmi Hocine), Meraga (c), Benali, Rahmouni - Coach: Mahmoud Bacha Abdelhamid & Biskri Mustapha	Stadium: Stade du 5 Juillet; Referee: Laâzouni, Benkhaled, Ghanem

12 November 1998 Round 8	WA Tlemcen	2–1	USM Alger	Tlemcen
	Habri 70'; Djalti 82'		77' Zekri	Stadium: Stade Akid Lotfi

19 November 1998 Round 9	USM Alger	1–0	IRB Hadjout	Bologhine
	Zekri 37'			Stadium: Omar Hamadi Stadium

26 November 1998 Round 10	JSM Tiaret	0–1	USM Alger	Tiaret
			37' Hamid Aït Belkacem	Stadium: Ahmed Kaïd Stadium

3 December 1998 Round 11	USM Alger	2–0	GC Mascara	Bologhine
	Hadj Adlane 53'; Hamid Aït Belkacem 63'			Stadium: Omar Hamadi Stadium

14 December 1998 Round 12	CR Belouizdad	2–1	USM Alger	Belouizdad
	Galloul 23'; Bakhti 39'		90' Djahnine	Stadium: August 20, 1955 Stadium

17 December 1998 Round 13	USM Alger	2–0	MC Oran	Bologhine
	Dziri 33'; Hamid Aït Belkacem 77'			Stadium: Omar Hamadi Stadium

24 December 1998 Round 14	USM Alger	4–0	WA Boufarik	Bologhine
	Hadj Adlane 39', 66' (pen.); Yacef 82', 90'			Stadium: Omar Hamadi Stadium

28 December 1998 Round 15	USM Alger	3–0	ASM Oran	Bologhine
	Hadj Adlane 35'; Djahnine 80'; Yacef 86'			Stadium: Omar Hamadi Stadium

28 January 1999 Round 16	USM Blida	0–1	USM Alger	Blida
			11' Dziri	Stadium: Stade Frères Brakni

1 February 1999 Round 17	USM Alger	2–0	SA Mohammadia	Bologhine
	Abacha 34', 52'			Stadium: Omar Hamadi Stadium

4 February 1999 Round 18	RC Kouba	0–0	USM Alger	Kouba
				Stadium: Omar Benhaddad Stadium

11 February 1999 Round 19	USM Alger	1–1	ES Mostaganem	Bologhine
	Hadj Adlane 5'			Stadium: Omar Hamadi Stadium

18 February 1999 Round 20	MC Alger	0–0	USM Alger	Algiers
	Fatahine (yellow card) 45'; Azzouz (yellow card) 50'; Derriche (yellow card) 73'; Saïfi (yellow card) 68' Hamened, Slatni Yacine, Aid, Azzouz Saïd (substituted off) 51' (Khenouf (substituted on) 51'), Fatahine (substituted off) 59' (Gasmi Hocine (substituted on) 59'), Derriche Abdellatif (substituted off) 83' (Ouahid (substituted on) 83'), Dob Fodil, Saifi, Doudène, Benali, Rahmouni - Coach: Kermali Abdelhamid & Biskri Mustapha		Ghoul (yellow card); Hamdani (yellow card) 49'; Hamdoud (yellow card) Belmellat, Hamdoud, Ghoul, Hamdani, Zeghdoud, Meftah, Hadj Adlane, Dziri, Djahnine, Yacef (substituted off) 64' (Manga (substituted on) 64'), Amirat (substituted off) 80' (Ghazi (substituted on) 80') - Coach: Nour Benzekri & Ahmed Aït El Hocine	Stadium: Stade du 5 Juillet; Referee: Salim Oussaci; Assistant referees: Debbiche, Laknèche

8 March 1999 Round 21	USM Alger	1–0	WA Tlemcen	Bologhine
	Zeghdoud (yellow card); Dziri (yellow card); Hadj Adlane 87' (yellow card)		Bouannani (yellow card); Habri (yellow card); Kherbouche (yellow card); Loukili (yellow card)	Stadium: Omar Hamadi Stadium; Referee: Benchenâa, Bouraoui, Oudjani
Note: Lineup for USM Alger - Belmellat, Hamdoud, Ghoul, Djahnine (Mehdaoui), Zeghdoud, Meftah, Hadj Adlane, Dziri, Smati, Yacef (Hamid Aït Belkacem), Amirat (Abacha) - Coach Nour Benzekri & Ahmed Aït El Hocine

18 March 1999 Round 22	IRB Hadjout	0–4	USM Alger	Hadjout
			27', 68', 90' Yacef; 75' Amirat	Stadium: Stade du 5 Juillet
Note: Lineup for USM Alger - , , , , , , , , , , - Coach Nour Benzekri & Ahmed Aït El Hocine

1 April 1999 Round 23	USM Alger	2–2	JSM Tiaret	Bologhine
	Hadj Adlane 25'; Ghoul 37'		Chadli 10'; Boukhtouchene 87'	Stadium: Omar Hamadi Stadium
Note: Lineup for USM Alger - , , , , , , , , , , - Coach Nour Benzekri & Ahmed Aït El Hocine

7 May 1999 Round 24	GC Mascara	3–1	USM Alger	Mascara
	Hassab 39', 60'; Belloumi 89'		58' Rahim	Stadium: Stade de l'Unité Africaine
Note: Lineup for USM Alger - , , , , , , , , , , - Coach Nour Benzekri & Ahmed Aït El Hocine

20 May 1999 Round 25	USM Alger	1–1	CR Belouizdad	Bologhine
	Manga 52'		Bakhti 35' (pen.)	Stadium: Omar Hamadi Stadium
Note: Lineup for USM Alger - , , , , , , , , , , - Coach Nour Benzekri & Ahmed Aït El Hocine

24 May 1999 Round 26	MC Oran	1–0	USM Alger	Oran
	Acimi 25' (pen.)			Stadium: Ahmed Zabana Stadium
Note: Lineup for USM Alger - , , , , , , , , , , - Coach Nour Benzekri & Ahmed Aït El Hocine

=== Algerian Cup ===
4 March 1999 Round of 64	JSM Tiaret	0–1	USM Alger	Médéa
16:00		Report	Zeghdoud 50'	Stadium: Stade Imam Lyes
Note: Lineup for USM Alger - , , , , , , , , , , - Coach Nour Benzekri & Ahmed Aït El Hocine

22 March 1999 Round of 32	USM Alger	3–0	FS Mostaganem	Médéa
16:00	Achiou 14'; Meftah 44'; Hamid Aït Belkacem 78'			Stadium: Stade Imam Lyes
Note: Lineup for USM Alger - , , , , , , , , , , - Coach Nour Benzekri & Ahmed Aït El Hocine

19 April 1999 Round of 16	USM Blida	0–4	USM Alger	Boumerdès
14:00			Hadj Adlane 26' (pen.), 67'; Amirat 30'; Ghoul 39'	Stadium: Stade Olympique Djilali Bounaama
Note: Lineup for USM Alger - , , , , , , , , , , - Coach Nour Benzekri & Ahmed Aït El Hocine

10 May 1999 Quarter-finals 1	USM Alger	4–0	WA Tlemcen	Bologhine
15:00	Ghoul 20', 65'; Hadj Adlane 38'; Djahnine 84'			Stadium: Stade Omar Hammadi
Note: Lineup for USM Alger - , , , , , , , , , , - Coach Nour Benzekri & Ahmed Aït El Hocine

28 May 1999 Quarter-finals 2	WA Tlemcen	1–0	USM Alger	Tlemcen
15:00	Boudjakdji 15'			Stadium: Stade Akid Lotfi
Note: Lineup for USM Alger - , , , , , , , , , , - Coach Nour Benzekri & Ahmed Aït El Hocine

26 June 1999 Semi-finals	USM Alger	2–2 (a.e.t.) (5–4 p)	MC Alger	Algiers (Note: The first leg was moved from Omar Hamadi Stadium (USM Alger's home ground) to July 5, 1962 Stadium (MC Alger's home ground) by the FA for "security reasons"; USM Alger did not show up; the FA subsequently awarded the game as lost by both teams (in spite of MC Alger's players showing up at the venue assigned), JS Kabylie president (Mohand Chérif Hannachi) in fact pressed for elimination of both sides)
15:00	Hamdani 21' (pen.); Yacef 113' Alane, Hamdoud, Ghoul (substituted off) 2' (Mehdaoui (substituted on) 2' (substituted off) 85', Smati (substituted on) 85'), Hamdani, Zeghdoud (c), Meftah Mahieddine, Hadj Adlane, Dziri, Djahnine, Manga (substituted off) 95' (Yacef (substituted on) 95'), Amirat - Coach: Nour Benzekri & Ahmed Aït El Hocine	Report	Saïfi 14'; Rahmouni 119' Hamened, Slatni Yacine, Aid, Ouahid, Lazizi, Derriche (substituted off) 100' (Azzouz Said, (substituted on) 100'), Dob Fodil, Saifi (Fatahine (substituted on) ), Gasmi (substituted off) 108' (Belaid, (substituted on) 108'), Meraga (c), Rahmouni - Coach: Abdelhamid Kermali & Mustapha Biskri	Stadium: Stade du 5 Juillet; Referee: Djamel Haimoudi; Assistant referees: Herraz, Djezzar
	Penalties
	Zeghdoud (penalty scored); Djahnine (penalty scored); Hamdani (penalty scored); Dziri (penalty scored); Hadj Adlane (penalty scored)		(penalty missed) Meraga; (penalty scored) Fatahine; (penalty scored) Slatni; (penalty scored) Azzouz; (penalty scored) Rahmouni

1 July 1999 Final	USM Alger	2–0	JS Kabylie	Algiers
15:00	Hamdani (yellow card) 16'; Dziri 76'; Hadj Adlane (yellow card) 80' (goal) 82' Allane - Hamdoud, Hamdani (c), Zeghdoud, Djahnine - Dziri (substituted off) 89' (Sloukia, (substituted on) 89'), Meftah, Smati - Yacef (substituted off) 55' (Manga, (substituted on) 55'), Hadj Adlane, Amirat (substituted off) 77' (Mehdaoui, (substituted on) 77') - Coach: Nour Benzekri & Ahmed Aït El Hocine	Report	Benhamlat (yellow card) 2'; Zafour (yellow card) 80' Boughrara, Selmoune, Drioueche, Zafour (substituted off) 87' (Maghraoui, (substituted on) 87'), Benhamlat, Nazef (substituted off) 64' (Saïb, (substituted on) 64'), Medane (c), Belkaïd, Boubrit, Aït Tahar, Ghazi - Coach: Kamel Mouassa	Stadium: Stade du 5 Juillet; Referee: Djamel Eddine Benchenâa; Assistant referees: Ahcen Bouraoui, Mohamed Oudjani

=== African Cup Winners' Cup ===
==== Quarter-final ====
6 September 1998 First leg	Primeiro de Agosto (Angola)	3–0	(Algeria) USM Alger	Luanda, Angola
15:00 UTC+1	Assis 35' (pen.), 72' (pen.); Moisés 88' Goliath / H.Vicente (substituted off) , Julião, Moisés II, Pedro / Assis, Filipe, Muanza (substituted off) , Stopirrá / Agó, Pena (substituted off) — Neto (substituted on) , Moisés I (substituted on) , Nsilulu (substituted on)	Report		Stadium: Estádio da Cidadela; Referee: Badibake Cinji (Congo DR); Assistant referees: Engo Yondu, Célestin Longalonga (Congo DR)

18 September 1998 Second leg	USM Alger (Algeria)	1–2	(Angola) Primeiro de Agosto	Blida, Algeria
15:00 UTC+1	Khouni 84' Allane, Hamdoud, Tizarouine (substituted off) (Ghoul, (substituted on) ), Zeghdoud, Djahnine, Hadj Adlane (substituted off) (Khouni, (substituted on) ), Hamdani, Smati, Zouani, Aït Belkacem, Manga (substituted off) (Zekri, (substituted on) )	Report	Agó 63', 76' Goliath / Julião, Moisés II, Neto (c), Pedro / Assis (substituted off) , Filipe, Muanza, Nsilulu / Agó, Pena — Castela (substituted on) , Moisés I (substituted on) , Mendonça (substituted on)	Stadium: Stade Frères Brakni; Referee: Abdelaziz Belftouh (Morocco); Assistant referees: Abdelaziz Eddahbi, Abdelmadjid Ktabri (Morocco)

=== CAF Cup ===
==== First round ====
14 March 1999 first leg	USM Alger (Algeria)	2–1	(Guinea) Horoya AC	Bologhine, Algeria
15:00	Hadj Adlane 59', 86'	Report		Stadium: Omar Hamadi Stadium
Note: Lineup for USM Alger - , Zeghdoud, Hamdani, , , , Smati, Hadj Adlane, Dziri, Yacef, - Coach Nour Benzekri & Ahmed Aït El Hocine

28 March 1999 Second leg	Horoya AC (Guinea)	3–2	(Algeria) USM Alger	Labé, Guinea
00:00		Report	1' Djahnine; 42' Manga	Stadium: Stade de la ville Labé
Note: Lineup for USM Alger - , , , , , , , , , , - Coach Nour Benzekri & Ahmed Aït El Hocine

==== Second round ====
2 May 1999 first leg	Al-Ahli Wad Madani (Sudan)	0–2	(Algeria) USM Alger	Wad Madani, Sudan
18:00		Report	59' Djahnine; 66' Yacef	Stadium: Algazira Stadium; Referee: ? (Tanzania)
Note: Lineup for USM Alger - , , , , , , , , , , - Coach Nour Benzekri & Ahmed Aït El Hocine

16 May 1999 Second leg	USM Alger (Algeria)	5–0	(Sudan) Al-Ahli Wad Madani	Bologhine, Algeria
16:00	Hadj Adlane 10', 20', 46'; Meftah (yellow card) 17'; Dziri 40'; Yacef 62' Allane, Hamdoud, Ghoul (substituted off) 61' (Boumrar (substituted on) 61'), Meftah, Zeghdoud, Djahnine, Hadj Adlane, Dziri (substituted off) 67' (Smati (substituted on) 67'), Mehdaoui, Amirat (substituted off) 45' (Aït Belkacem (substituted on) 45'), Yacef - Coach: Nour Benzekri & Ahmed Aït El Hocine	Report	Abderazak Ennour (yellow card) 79' Haroun, Zoum, Mohamed, Annesr, Ibrahim, Al-hamdane, Soulymane, Al Sayed, Seyf Eddine, Annour, Al Moati, Kassem Allah, Al-anwaraine - Coach: Cherif Ahmed Almoussa	Stadium: Omar Hamadi Stadium; Referee: Mohamed Abdallah (Libya)

== Squad information ==
=== Appearances and goals ===
No.	Pos	Nat	Player	Total		Super Division		Algerian Cup		Cup Winners' Cup		CAF Cup	
No.	Pos	Nat	Player	Apps	Goals	Apps	Goals	Apps	Goals	Apps	Goals	Apps	Goals
	GK	(Algeria) ALG	Farid Belmellat	3	0	3	0	0	0	0	0	0	0
	GK	(Algeria) ALG	Abderrahmane Allane	6	0	2	0	2	0	1	0	1	0
	DF	(Algeria) ALG	Tarek Ghoul	7	0	4	0	1	0	0+1	0	1	0
	DF	(Algeria) ALG	Mounir Zeghdoud	9	0	5	0	2	0	1	0	1	0
	DF	(Algeria) ALG	Fayçal Hamdani	7	1	4	0	2	1	1	0	0	0
	DF	(Algeria) ALG	Mahieddine Meftah	8	0	5	0	2	0	0	0	1	0
	DF	(Algeria) ALG	Mohamed Hamdoud	9	1	5	1	2	0	1	0	1	0
	DF	(Algeria) ALG	Fouad Smati	5	0	1	0	1+1	0	1	0	0+1	0
	DF	(Algeria) ALG	Rachid Boumrar	1	0	0	0	0	0	0	0	0+1	0
	DF	(Algeria) ALG	Abdelouahab Tizarouine	2	0	1	0	0	0	1	0	0	0
	MF	(Algeria) ALG	Farid Djahnine	9	0	5	0	2	0	1	0	1	0
	MF	(Algeria) ALG	Karim Ghazi	1	0	0+1	0	0	0	0	0	0	0
	MF	(Algeria) ALG	Salaheddine Mehdaoui	6	0	3	0	0+2	0	0	0	1	0
	MF	(Algeria) ALG	Mohamed Abacha	1	0	0+1	0	0	0	0	0	0	0
	MF	(Algeria) ALG	Samir Sloukia	2	0	1	0	0+1	0	0	0	0	0
	MF	(Algeria) ALG	Billel Dziri	5	2	2	0	2	1	0	0	1	1
	MF	(Algeria) ALG	Hamid Aït Belkacem	5	0	2+1	0	0	0	1	0	0+1	0
	MF	(Algeria) ALG	Athmane Samir Amirat	7	0	3+1	0	2	0	0	0	1	0
	FW	(Algeria) ALG	Hamza Yacef	5	2	2	0	1+1	1	0	0	1	1
	FW	(Algeria) ALG	Azzedine Rahim	0	0	0	0	0	0	0	0	0	0
	FW	(Algeria) ALG	Tarek Hadj Adlane	8	6	4	2	2	1	1	0	1	3
	FW	(Nigeria) NGA	Mohamed Manga	5	0	1+1	0	1+1	0	1	0	0	0
	FW	(Algeria) ALG	Nacer Zekri	3	0	0+2	0	0	0	0+1	0	0	0
	FW	(Algeria) ALG	Réda Zouani	4	0	2+1	0	0	0	1	0	0	0
	FW	(Algeria) ALG	Abdelmalek Khouni	3	1	2	0	0	0	0+1	1	0	0

Last updated: 10 May 2001
Source: Competitions

=== Goalscorers ===
Includes all competitive matches. The list is sorted alphabetically by surname when total goals are equal.

No.	Nat.	Player	Pos.	L 1	AC	CC 2	TOTAL
7	(Algeria)	Tarek Hadj Adlane	FW	8	4	5	17
10	(Algeria)	Hamza Yacef	FW	6	1	2	9
?	(Algeria)	Hamid Aït Belkacem	MF	4	1	0	5
3	(Algeria)	Farid Djahnine	MF	2	1	2	5
?	(Algeria)	Tarek Ghoul	DF	1	3	0	4
8	(Algeria)	Billel Dziri	MF	2	1	1	4
?	(Algeria)	Mohamed Abacha	MF	2	0	0	2
?	(Algeria)	Nacer Zekri	FW	2	0	0	2
11	(Algeria)	Athmane Samir Amirat	MF	1	1	0	2
12	(Nigeria)	Mohamed Manga	FW	1	0	1	2
2	(Algeria)	Mohamed Hamdoud	DF	1	0	0	1
?	(Algeria)	Réda Zouani	FW	1	0	0	1
?	(Algeria)	Azzedine Rahim	FW	1	0	0	1
5	(Algeria)	Mounir Zeghdoud	DF	0	1	0	1
6	(Algeria)	Mahieddine Meftah	DF	0	1	0	1
4	(Algeria)	Fayçal Hamdani	DF	0	1	0	1
?	(Algeria)	Hocine Achiou	MF	0	1	0	1
Own Goals				0	0	0	0
Totals				32	16	11	59

== Transfers ==
=== In ===
Date	Pos	Player	From club	Transfer fee	Source
1 January 1999	CM	(Algeria) Billel Dziri	(Tunisia) Étoile Sportive du Sahel	Loan Return	

=== Out ===
Date	Pos	Player	To club	Transfer fee	Source
1 July 1998	MF	(Algeria) Mehdi Khelfouni	USM El Harrach	Free transfer	
