= 2025–26 USM Alger basketball season =

USM Alger
2025–26 season
- President: (Algeria) Fouad Djabrouni
- Head coach: (Algeria) Arab Kamel Ait Kaci (from 21 August 2025)
- Arena: Salle OMS Mourad Boukechoura, Raïs Hamidou; Salle OMS Abdelaziz Ben Tifour, Hydra
- Super Division: 4th
- Playoffs: Semi-finals
- Algerian Cup: Quarter-finals
- Biggest win: USM Alger 80–55 NA Hussein Dey (November 8, 2025)
- Biggest defeat: NB Staouéli 75–64 USM Alger (April 21, 2026)

The 2025–26 season was USM Alger's 64th in existence, their 7th consecutive season in the top flight of the Algerian basketball, USM Alger participated in the season's editions of the Algerian Cup.

== Overview ==
On September 12, the 2025–26 season of the Algerian Basketball Super Division began, featuring 14 participating teams and a new competition format recently adopted by the Algerian Basketball Federation (FABB). The 2025–26 Super Division was played in two phases: a 26-match regular season, followed by play-offs for the title and play-downs to avoid relegation. The top six teams qualified directly for the play-offs, while the bottom four will battle to avoid relegation. The play-off series is played in best-of-three or best-of-five formats, with home advantage given to the higher-ranked teams.

USM Alger made a successful start to the Super Division, with two straight victories in the opening rounds of the Super Division, confirming its ambitions. In an away fixture on the court of CS Tlemcen, the Usmists showed character in a narrow 63–61 win. In a game that went down to the wire, it was Ahmed Boutiba (17 points) who carried the team offensively, well supported by Bacim Medjoubi, who proved valuable on both ends of the floor with 8 rebounds. Team spirit also played its part, as four different players each dished out 2 assists, a clear reflection of the collective mindset driving the squad.

USMA defeated WO Boufarik 83–68 at Salle OMS Abdelaziz Ben Tifour in Hydra. Faredj Messaoudi scored 14 points, Laamouri Merahi recorded 13 rebounds, and Zakariya Khodja recorded 8 assists. Following the win, USM Alger moved to four points, level with NB Staouéli in the Super Division standings.

On September 26, USM Alger faced their city rivals MC Alger. The match ended in a defeat for USMA, with a final score of 69–68. USMA had taken the lead after three quarters (16–14, 16–19, 18–20), but eventually gave way in the final, which was won by MC Alger (19–15). On an individual level, Ilyes Fodil finished as the team’s top scorer with 15 points, while Laamouri Merahi delivered, recording 16 rebounds and 7 assists. Despite these efforts, USM Alger left the court with a one-point loss in this Algiers derby. On October 17, 2025, USM Alger came close to pulling off an upset on the court of NB Staouéli, narrowly losing 61–64. Trailing by 13 points at halftime (27–40), the Red and Black mounted a comeback to level the score (49–49) before the final quarter. Despite their efforts and solid defense, they conceded in the dying seconds on a three-pointer from Amine Bensalah. USMA was 9th in the standings with 9 points.

=== Algerian cup ===
USM Alger secured a qualification to the quarter-finals of the 2025–26 Algerian Basketball Cup after a narrow 63–61 victory over Rouiba CB. The game, postponed from February 28, 2026 due to security issues, was eventually played on March 27, 2026. A strong start in the first quarter (23–15) gave USM Alger the edge. Laamouri Merahi was a key figure for USMA, delivering an outstanding performance with 22 points, 10 rebounds, and 4 assists, leading his team on both ends of the court.

On April 17, 2026, USM Alger suffered an elimination in the quarter-finals after a 80–74 loss in overtime to TRA Draria. Considered the favorites heading into the game, USM Alger struggled against a well-organized and highly motivated opponent. USMA showed flashes of quality but lacked consistency when it mattered most, allowing their opponents to seize control and secure qualification. This defeat ended the USM Alger’s cup campaign, forcing the team to regroup and shift focus to their upcoming Super Division challenges.

== Players ==
=== Super Division roster ===
Note: Flags indicate national team eligibility at FIBA-sanctioned events. Players may hold other non-FIBA nationalities not displayed.

USM Alger roster
Players
Coaches

Pos.	No.	Nat.	Name	Ht.	Wt.	Age
SF	1	(Algeria)	Belhadj, Ramadane	1.70 m (5 ft 7 in)	65 kg (143 lb)	30 – 5 April 1995
PF	2	(Algeria)	Merahi, Lamouri	1.92 m (6 ft 4 in)	80 kg (176 lb)	29 – 6 October 1995
PG	3	(Mali)	Kanté, Mahamadou (I)	1.92 m (6 ft 4 in)		33 – 2 March 1992
PG	4	(Algeria)	Khoudja, Zakaria	1.85 m (6 ft 1 in)	75 kg (165 lb)	20 – 10 May 2005
SG	4	(Algeria)	Fodil, Ilyes	1.80 m (5 ft 11 in)	75 kg (165 lb)	20 – 4 April 2005
PF	7	(Algeria)	Lakeb, Riadh	1.93 m (6 ft 4 in)	60 kg (132 lb)	19 – 27 March 2006
C	8	(Algeria)	Zaim, Mehdi	2.07 m (6 ft 9 in)	98 kg (216 lb)	22 – 1 September 2003
F	9	(Algeria)	Mokhfi, Abdelouaheb (injured)	1.96 m (6 ft 5 in)	86 kg (190 lb)	24 – 15 October 2000
PF	11	(Algeria)	Redouane, Tarek	2.00 m (6 ft 7 in)	85 kg (187 lb)	32 – 11 April 1993
SG	15	(Algeria)	Mimouni, Redouane	1.86 m (6 ft 1 in)	80 kg (176 lb)	38 – 23 August 1987
PF	19	(Algeria)	Chaid, Badreddine (C)	1.87 m (6 ft 2 in)	74 kg (163 lb)	22 – 17 April 2003
SG	21	(Algeria)	Medjoubi, Bacim	1.88 m (6 ft 2 in)	75 kg (165 lb)	23 – 20 October 2001
G	24	(Algeria)	Amairia, Mohamed	2.01 m (6 ft 7 in)	80 kg (176 lb)	39 – 9 May 1986
C	26	(Algeria)	Messaoudi, Faredj (injured)	2.15 m (7 ft 1 in)	105 kg (231 lb)	22 – 20 January 2003
SG	77	(Algeria)	Boutiba, Ahmed	1.94 m (6 ft 4 in)	85 kg (187 lb)	29 – 22 December 1995

Head coach

- (Algeria) Arab Kamel Ait Kaci

Assistant coach(es)

- (Algeria) Khaled Berkane

Legend

- (C) Team captain
- (I) Import player
- Injured

- Roster
Updated: September 13, 2025

=== Depth chart ===
Pos.	Starting 5	Bench 1	Bench 2	Bench 3	Inactive
C	Mehdi Zaim	Faredj Messaoudi			Nabil Saidi
PF	Laamouri Merahi	Tarek Redouane		Badreddine Chaid	Riadh Lakeb
SF	Abdelouaheb Mokhfi		Ramadane Belhadj
SG	Ilyes Fodil	Redouane Mimouni	Ahmed Boutiba	Bacim Medjoubi
PG	Mahamadou Kanté	Zakaria Khoudja	Mohamed Amairia

(colours: Algerian players; foreign players)

=== Transactions ===
==== In ====
No.	Pos.	Nat.	Name	Age	Moving from		Type	Ends	Transfer fee	Date	Source
15	G	(Algeria)	Redouane Mimouni	39	WO Boufarik	(Algeria)	End of contract	June 2026	Free	Unknown	
3	PG	(Mali)	Mahamadou Kanté	34	CRB Tombouctou	(Mali)	End of contract	June 2026	Free	Unknown	

==== Out ====
No.	Pos.	Nat.	Name	Age	Moving to		Type	Transfer fee	Date	Source
2	PG	(Algeria)	Bouhaous Messaoudi	38	CSC Djasr Kasentina	(Algeria)	End of contract	Free	Unknown	
1	PF	(Algeria)	Moussa Bougria	33	CSC Djasr Kasentina	(Algeria)	End of contract	Free	Unknown	
12	C	(Algeria)	Nabil Saidi	46	NA Hussein Dey	(Algeria)	?	Free	Unknown	

== Pre-season and friendlies ==
=== Friendly matches ===
20 November 2025	M Ouled Chebel	vs.	USM Alger	Ouled Chebel
:	Scoring by quarter: –, –, –, –
				Arena: Salle OMS Boualem Bouhedja

== Competitions ==
=== Overview ===
Competition	First match	Last match	Starting round	Final position	Record							
Competition	First match	Last match	Starting round	Final position	Pld	W	D	L	PF	PA	PD	Win %
Super Division	13 September 2025	14 March 2026	Round 1	4th	26	16		10	1,818	1,685	+133	61.54
Super Division Playoffs	3 April 2026	24 April 2026	Quarter-finals	Semi-finals	4	2		2	254	255	−1	50.00
Algerian Cup	Round of 16	Quarter-finals	27 March 2026	17 April 2026	2	1		1	137	141	−4	50.00
Total					32	19	0	13	2,209	2,081	+128	59.38

Last updated: April 24, 2026
Source: Competitions

=== Super Division ===
==== League table ====
Pos	Team	Pld	W	L	GF	GA	GD	Pts	
2	WO Boufarik	26	17	9	2083	1838	+245	43	Advance to play-off
3	CS Tlemcen	26	17	9	1753	1665	+88	43	Advance to play-off
4	USM Alger	26	16	10	1818	1685	+133	42	Advance to play-off
5	USM Blida	26	16	10	1690	1625	+65	42	Advance to play-off
6	Rouiba CB	26	16	10	1832	1736	+96	42	Advance to play-off

First match(es) will be played: March 17, 2026. Source: FABB

==== Results summary ====
Overall						Home					Away				
Pld	W	L	PF	PA	PD	W	L	PF	PA	PD	W	L	PF	PA	PD
26	16	10	1818	1685	+133	11	2	963	823	+140	5	8	855	862	−7

Last updated: March 14, 2026.
Source: Competitive matches

==== Results by round ====
Round	1	2	3	4	5	6	7	8	9	10	11	12	13	14	15	16	17	18	19	20	21	22	23	24	25	26
Ground	A	H	A	A	H	A	H	A	H	A	H	A	H	H	A	H	H	A	H	A	H	A	H	A	H	A
Result	W	W	L	L	W	L	W	L	W	L	L	W	W	W	L	W	W	W	L	L	W	L	W	W	W	W
Position	7	3	4	8	5	9	6	8	6	8	9	7	7	6	7	5	5	3		7	5	7	7	6	5	4

Source: Competitive matches
A = Away; H = Home; W = Win; L = Loss; R = Rest

==== Matches ====
All times are local, WAT (UTC+1).

September 13, 2025 1	CS Tlemcen	61–63	USM Alger	Tlemcen
14:00	Scoring by quarter: 20–18, 14–11, 12–14, 15–20
	Pts: Yacine Benyahya 16; Rebs: Seyyid Ahmed Bensalah 11; Asts: Mustapha Braik 3	Boxscore	Pts: Medjoubi, Boutiba 17; Rebs: Medjoubi 8 Asts: Four players 2	Arena: Salle OMS Kara Zaitri Imama; Referees: Fethi Chaib, Habib Meheni, Houari Benmendil

September 19, 2025 2	USM Alger	83–68	WO Boufarik	Hydra
17:00	Scoring by quarter: 20–16, 18–14, 26–16, 19–22
	Pts: Boutiba, Messaoudi 14; Rebs: Merahi 13; Asts: Khodja 8	Boxscore	Pts: Louai Chebel 20; Rebs: Three players 8 Asts: Tarek Hamdani 7	Arena: Salle OMS Abdelaziz Ben Tifour; Referees: Anis Bennani, Kaddour Hamid, Fethi Chaib

September 26, 2025 3	MC Alger	69–68	USM Alger	Hydra
19:00	Scoring by quarter: 16–14, 16–19, 18–20, 19–15
	Pts: Mustapha Adrar, Ramzi Merahi 17; Rebs: Oussama Aggoun 10; Asts: Ramzi Merahi 7	Boxscore	Pts: Ilyes Fodil 15; Rebs: Laamouri Merahi 16; Asts: Laamouri Merahi 7	Arena: Salle OMS Abdelaziz Ben Tifour; Referees: Sofiane Hammada, Redouane Ferrani, Mouad Harrache

October 3, 2025 4	USM Blida	77–67	USM Alger	Blida
16:00	Scoring by quarter: 16–17, 20–24, 16–12, 25–14
	Pts: Abdesslem Dekkiche 29; Rebs: Dekkiche, Boudoumi 8 Asts: Mousaab Kaoub 5	Boxscore	Pts: Medjoubi 26; Rebs: Merahi 9 Asts: Merahi 5	Arena: Salle Hocine Chalane; Attendance: 0 (close doors); Referees: Hamid Kaddour, Fethi Chaib, Farid Amrane

October 10, 2025 5	USM Alger	67–54	M Ouled Chebel	Raïs Hamidou
17:00	Scoring by quarter: 15–16, 12–13, 15–11, 25–14
	Pts: Messaoudi 18; Rebs: Messaoudi 10; Asts: Mokhfi, Boutiba 4	Boxscore	Pts: Abdelmalek Kaci 18; Rebs: Abdelmalek Kaci 7 Asts: Slimane Boumedfa, Abdelwaheb Bounaas 3	Arena: Salle OMS Mourad Boukechoura; Referees: Adel Kahallou, Mouad Harrache, Mohammed Zahaf

October 17, 2025 6	NB Staouéli	64–61	USM Alger	Staoueli
16:00	Scoring by quarter: 17–14, 23–13, 9–22, 15–12
	Pts: Mohamed Amine Bensalah 21; Rebs: Abderraouf Benrighi 9 Asts: Anis Mohamed Fedala 6	Boxscore	Pts: Boutiba 16; Rebs: Zaim 11; Asts: Medjoubi 4	Arena: Salle OMS de Staouéli; Referees: Adel Kahallou, Smail Heddi, Mohamed Maarouf

October 24, 2025 7	USM Alger	102–83	US Sétif	Raïs Hamidou
17:00	Scoring by quarter: 20–11, 28–25, 22–29, 32–18
	Pts: Messaoudi 16; Rebs: Zaim 11; Asts: Khodja 12	Boxscore	Pts: Ryadh Ilyas Souici 21; Rebs: Ryadh Ilyas Souici 8 Asts: Abderaouf Faidia, Ouail Sofiane Gadaoui 7	Arena: Salle OMS Mourad Boukechoura; Referees: Sofiane Si Youcef, Farid Amrane, Fateh Ghaib

November 1, 2025 8	Rouiba CB	68–58	USM Alger	Rouïba
17:00	Scoring by quarter: 26–15, 18–14, 9–22, 15–7
	Pts: Sid Ali Ben Zaim, Mohammed Amine Roubai 15; Rebs: Sid Ali Ben Zaim 13; Asts: Mohammed Amine Roubai 4	Boxscore	Pts: Boutiba 17; Rebs: Mehdi Zaim 9 Asts: Four players 3	Arena: Salle OMS Mohamed Kadiri; Attendance: 737; Referees: Adlen Larouci, Redouane Ferrani, Mohamed Marouf

November 8, 2025 9	USM Alger	80–55	NA Hussein Dey	Raïs Hamidou
17:00	Scoring by quarter: 30–13, 16–16, 19–9, 15–17
	Pts: Mokhfi 18; Rebs: Mokhfi 8 Asts: Khodja 6	Boxscore	Pts: Nabil Saidi, Mohamed Amine Hasnaoui 13; Rebs: Nabil Saidi 10; Asts: Three players 4	Arena: Salle OMS Mourad Boukechoura; Referees: Adel Kahallou, Smail Heddi, Fateh Ghaib

November 14, 2025 10	CSC Djasr Kasentina	75–71	USM Alger	Hydra
16:00	Scoring by quarter: 15–17, 26–27, 22–10, 12–17
	Pts: Hezil Yamame 19; Rebs: Bouhaous Messaoudi 13; Asts: Zakaria Guezout 6	Boxscore	Pts: Medjoubi 13; Rebs: Merahi 12; Asts: Khodja, Belhadj 6	Arena: Salle OMS Abdelaziz Ben Tifour; Referees: Adel Kahallou, Redouane Ferrani, Yacine Kahil

November 29, 2025 11	USM Alger	78–81	CR Beni Saf	Raïs Hamidou
14:30	Scoring by quarter: 24–16, 9–25, 23–18, 22–22
	Pts: Merahi 18; Rebs: Messaoudi 12; Asts: Khodja 6	Boxscore	Pts: Mamadou Keita 23; Rebs: Djaouad Belabbes 9 Asts: Youcef Boudoumi, Houssam Moussa Benyacine 4	Arena: Salle OMS Mourad Boukechoura; Referees: Fethi Chaib, Farid Amrane, Anis Bennani

December 5, 2025 12	CRB Dar Beida	59–66	USM Alger	Dar El Beïda
15:30	Scoring by quarter: 13–15, 17–14, 13–17, 16–20
	Pts: Mohamed Belhadi 16; Rebs: Abdesselem Semrouni 10; Asts: Ishak Yacine Bouamama 3	Boxscore	Pts: Boutiba 15; Rebs: Merahi 9 Asts: Amairia 5	Arena: Salle OMS de Dar El Beïda; Referees: Anis Bennani, Sofiane Hammada, Mouad Harrache

December 13, 2025 13	USM Alger	70–59	TRA Draria	Raïs Hamidou
16:30	Scoring by quarter: 20–18, 18–12, 18–14, 14–15
	Pts: Fodil 16; Rebs: Messaoudi 14; Asts: Belhadj 5	Boxscore	Pts: Nabil Nouari 22; Rebs: Nabil Nouari 9 Asts: Nouari, Gueddoudj 3	Arena: Salle OMS Mourad Boukechoura; Referees: Adel Kahallou, Farid Amrane, Yacine Kahil

December 19, 2025 14	USM Alger	60–57	CS Tlemcen	Raïs Hamidou
15:00	Scoring by quarter: 19–13, 14–18, 11–16, 16–10
	Pts: Boutiba 16; Rebs: Zaim 10; Asts: Khodja 5	Boxscore	Pts: Yacine Benyahya 17; Rebs: Yacine Benyahya 10; Asts: Farouk Hadjadj-Aoul 5	Arena: Salle OMS Mourad Boukechoura; Referees: Adlene Laarouci, Anis Bennani, Amir Rahali

December 23, 2025 15	WO Boufarik	67–62	USM Alger	Boufarik
18:00	Scoring by quarter: 21–14, 17–14, 15–16, 14–18
	Pts: Rabah Zitoun 19; Rebs: Djamel Eddine Achache 13; Asts: Tarek Hamdani 8	Boxscore	Pts: Mimouni 17; Rebs: Merahi 10; Asts: Belhadj 5	Arena: Salle Moussa Cheraf; Referees: Anis Bennani, Mhamed Berrah, Yacine Kahil

December 27, 2025 16	USM Alger	74–65	MC Alger	Rouïba
19:00	Scoring by quarter: 23–23, 16–14, 11–17, 24–11
	Pts: Merahi 19; Rebs: Zaim 19; Asts: Merahi 4	Boxscore	Pts: Mustapha Adrar 20; Rebs: Bourkaib, Ramzi Merahi 8 Asts: Oussama aggoun 8	Arena: Salle OMS Mohamed Kadiri; Referees: Adlen Larouci, Hamid Kaddour, Berrah

January 2, 2026 17	USM Alger	63–56	USM Blida	Staoueli
19:00	Scoring by quarter: 21–10, 18–18, 9–10, 15–18
	Pts: Merahi 11; Rebs: Zaim 9 Asts: Belhadj 4	Boxscore	Pts: Abdesslem Dekkiche 17; Rebs: Mohamed Boudoumi, Mohamed Zahaf 10; Asts: Ali Aichi 3	Arena: Salle OMS de Staouéli; Referees: Chaib Fethi, Harrache Mouad, Amrane Farid

January 6, 2026 18	M Ouled Chebel	60–72	USM Alger	Ouled Chebel
17:30	Scoring by quarter: 13–26, 19–10, 15–21, 13–15
	Pts: Abdelmalek Kaci 17; Rebs: Ahmed Allali 9 Asts: Abdelwaheb Bounaas 5	Boxscore	Pts: Merahi 21; Rebs: Zaim 12; Asts: Merahi 5	Arena: Salle OMS Boualem Bouhedja; Attendance: 51; Referees: Hamid Kaddour, Berrah Mhamed, Ferrani Redouane

January 13, 2026 19	USM Alger	vs.	NB Staouéli	Raïs Hamidou
16:00
		Boxscore		Arena: Salle OMS Mourad Boukechoura; Referees: Anis Bennani, Fethi Ghaib, Adel Kahallou
Note: The match has been postponed to a later date.

January 17, 2026 20	US Sétif	79–75	USM Alger	Sétif
19:00	Scoring by quarter: 21–15, 26–19, 18–21, 14–20
	Pts: Mbav Mutomb 24; Rebs: Mbav Mutomb 12; Asts: Yacine Kalkoul 11	Boxscore	Pts: Boutiba 18; Rebs: Zaim 15; Asts: Khodja 9	Arena: Salle 8 Mai 1945; Referees: Adel Kahallou, Sofiane Hammada, Mohamed Anis Fritah

January 27, 2026 19	USM Alger	67–69	NB Staouéli	Staoueli
17:00	Scoring by quarter: 14–14, 13–18, 19–20, 21–17
	Pts: Boutiba 27; Rebs: Merahi 11; Asts: Belhadj, Khodja 3	Boxscore	Pts: Anis Mohamed Fedala 21; Rebs: Mohamed Amine Bensalah 10; Asts: Anis Mohamed Fedala 6	Arena: Salle OMS de Staouéli; Attendance: 500; Referees: Anis Bennani, Adel Kahallou, Fateh Ghaib

February 3, 2026 21	USM Alger	70–49	Rouiba CB	Hydra
17:30	Scoring by quarter: 16–8, 25–11, 13–24, 16–6
	Pts: Merahi 17; Rebs: Merahi, Zaim 10; Asts: Belhadj, Kanté 6	Boxscore	Pts: Ziad Chenieff 12; Rebs: Sid Ali Ben Zaim, Ibrahim Toure 8 Asts: Mohamed Zaki Guermat 4	Arena: Salle OMS Abdelaziz Ben Tifour; Referees: Anis Bennani, A LAATIBI, A ZAHAF

February 7, 2026 22	NA Hussein Dey	71–61	USM Alger	Algiers
15:00	Scoring by quarter: 18–12, 16–17, 19–10, 18–22
	Pts: Boutiba 23; Rebs: Zaim 15; Asts: Belhadj 7	Boxscore	Pts: Nabil Saidi 16; Rebs: Mohamed Amine Hasnaoui 16; Asts: Farouk Bellakhdar 7	Arena: Salle Mohamed Handjer; Attendance: 50; Referees: Harache Mouad, Maarouf Mohamed, Heddi Ismail

February 17, 2026 23	USM Alger	73–64	CSC Djasr Kasentina	Raïs Hamidou
17:30	Scoring by quarter: 30–15, 16–18, 7–18, 20–13
	Pts: Merahi, Kanté 14; Rebs: Kanté 13; Asts: Kanté 8	Boxscore	Pts: Yamame Hezil 27; Rebs: Yamame Hezil 12; Asts: Bouhaous Messaoudi, Ahmed Sadoudi 4	Arena: Salle OMS Mourad Boukechoura; Referees: Si Youcef Sofiane, Fouchene Abderezak, Heddi Ismail

February 21, 2026 24	CR Beni Saf	55–67	USM Alger	Béni Saf
22:00	Scoring by quarter: 12–24, 14–14, 15–14, 14–15
	Pts: Merahi 22; Rebs: Zaim 16; Asts: Kanté 6	Boxscore	Pts: Imad Didi 20; Rebs: Hamam Mondesir Dade 9 Asts: Issam Benarbia, Houssam Moussa Benyacine 3	Arena: Salle OMS Yousfi Said; Referees: Hamid Kaddour, Zenagui Nadjat, Benmendil Houari

March 6, 2026 25	USM Alger	76–63	CRB Dar Beida	Raïs Hamidou
22:00	Scoring by quarter: 22–6, 19–17, 21–25, 14–15
	Pts: Boutiba 23; Rebs: Kanté 8 Asts: Kanté 8	Boxscore	Pts: Sif Eddine Benbrahim 18; Rebs: Younes Benanesbaghor 12; Asts: Ouail Yacine Amoura 7	Arena: Salle OMS Mourad Boukechoura; Attendance: 100; Referees: Sidali Osmane, Farid Amrane, Abderezak Fouchen

March 14, 2026 26	TRA Draria	57–64	USM Alger	Ouled Fayet
22:00	Scoring by quarter: 9–20, 12–15, 15–18, 21–11
	Pts: Nabil Nouari 18; Rebs: Omar Belliche, Abderrahim Benlakehal 9 Asts: Adam Mohammed Berrouane 5	Boxscore	Pts: Merahi 17; Rebs: Zaim 14; Asts: Kante 4	Arena: Salle OMS Ghazali Salem; Attendance: 100; Referees: Hamada Sofiane, Latibi Ouahid, Friteh Mohamed Anis

==== Super Division Playoffs ====
April 3, 2026 QF 1st leg	USM Alger	72–62 (Series: USM Alger leads series, 1–0)	USM Blida	Hydra
17:00	Scoring by quarter: 15–23, 18–16, 26–10, 13–13
	Pts: Ahmed Boutiba 23; Rebs: Laamouri Merahi 13; Asts: Laamouri Merahi 7	Boxscore	Pts: Mousaab Kaoub, Mohamed Boudoumi 19; Rebs: Mohamed Boudoumi 7 Asts: Mousaab Kaoub, Mohamed Zidouni 3	Arena: Salle OMS Abdelaziz Ben Tifour; Attendance: 150; Referees: Si Youcef Sofiane, Hamid Kaddour, Fritah Mohamed Anis

April 8, 2026 QF 2nd leg	USM Blida	58–61 (Series: USM Alger wins series, 2–0)	USM Alger	Blida
17:00	Scoring by quarter: 18–11, 14–20, 11–14, 15–16
	Pts: Mohamed Zahaf 21; Rebs: Azeddine Boulesnane 6 Asts: Azeddine Boulesnane, Mohamed Zahaf 2	Boxscore	Pts: Ahmed Boutiba 17; Rebs: Mehdi Zaim 11; Asts: Ramdane Belhadj 5	Arena: Salle Hocine Chalane; Attendance: 150; Referees: Bennani Anis, Hammada Sofiane, Latibi Wahid

April 21, 2026 SF 1st leg	NB Staouéli	75–64 (Series: NB Staouéli leads series, 1–0)	USM Alger	Staoueli
19:00	Scoring by quarter: 22–18, 20–14, 13–20, 20–12
	Pts: Hichem Dekakene 28; Rebs: Mohamed Amine Bensalah 8 Asts: Merouane Yahya 5	Boxscore	Pts: Ahmed Boutiba 15; Rebs: Ahmed Boutiba 8 Asts: Zakariya Khodja 11	Arena: Salle OMS de Staouéli; Attendance: 1200; Referees: Larouci Adlen, Kahallou Adel, Hammada Sofiane

April 24, 2026 SF 2nd leg	USM Alger	57–60 (Series: NB Staouéli wins series, 2–0)	NB Staouéli	Hydra
17:00	Scoring by quarter: 18–11, 13–16, 16–16, 10–17
	Pts: Ahmed Boutiba 25; Rebs: Redouane Mimouni, Mehdi Zaim 8 Asts: Four players 2	Boxscore	Pts: Mohamed Amine Bensalah 21; Rebs: Mohamed Boussad 9 Asts: Mohamed Boussad 4	Arena: Salle OMS Abdelaziz Ben Tifour; Attendance: 500; Referees: Si Youcef Sofiane, Hammada Sofiane, Meheni Habib

=== Algerian Cup ===
February 28, 2026 Round of 16	USM Alger	vs.	Rouiba CB	Staoueli
22:00
		Boxscore		Arena: Salle OMS de Staouéli; Referees: Hamid Kaddour, Mhamed Berrah, Fethi Chaib
Note: The match has been postponed to a later date due to the lack of security.

March 27, 2026 Round of 16	USM Alger	63–61	Rouiba CB	Staoueli
17:30	Scoring by quarter: 23–15, 15–21, 13–14, 12–11
	Pts: Merahi 22; Rebs: Merahi 10; Asts: Merahi 4	Boxscore	Pts: Abdel Hakim Abaz 13; Rebs: Abdel Hakim Abaz, Sid Ali Ben Zaim 8 Asts: Ziad Chenieff 4	Arena: Salle OMS de Staouéli; Attendance: 240; Referees: Larouci Adlene, Latibi Wahid, Harach Mouaad

April 17, 2026 Quarter-finals	USM Alger	74–80(OT)	TRA Draria	Rouïba
18:00	Scoring by quarter: 25–20, 16–18, 13–19, 14–11, Overtime: 6–12
	Pts: Boutiba 17; Rebs: Zaim 12; Asts: Belhadj 8	Boxscore	Pts: Faycal Zerouk Belkhodja 18; Rebs: Omar Belliche 10; Asts: Nabil Gueddoudj 5	Arena: Salle OMS Mohamed Kadiri; Attendance: 500; Referees: Kahalou Adel, Latibi Wahid, Marouf Mohamed

== Statistics ==
=== Super Division ===
As of 14 March 2026

Legend
GP	Games played	GS	Games started	MPG	Minutes per game
FG%	Field-goal percentage	3P%	3-point field-goal percentage	FT%	Free-throw percentage
RPG	Rebounds per game	APG	Assists per game	SPG	Steals per game
BPG	Blocks per game	PPG	Points per game

Player	GP	GS	MPG	2FG%	3FG%	FT%	RPG	APG	BPG	SPG	PPG
Laamouri Merahi	25	21	30:11	47.2 %	26.8 %	70 %	7.9	3.3	0.3	2.5	12.0
Zakariya Khodja	21	20	22:21	46.7 %	16 %	66.1 %	3.3	4.0	0.0	1.4	7.8
Bacim Medjoubi	22	7	19:13	54.8 %	25.3 %	62.1 %	3.4	1.0	0.3	1.3	7.3
Ahmed Boutiba	23	11	26:13	46.2 %	30.5 %	73.1 %	4.8	1.7	0.2	0.9	13.2
Ramdane Belhadj	26	2	19:41	29.5 %	19.5 %	50 %	3.1	2.8	0.0	1.2	4.0
Tarek Redouane	7	1	17:39	40 %	16.7 %	66.7 %	3.8	1.0	0.2	0.6	3.4
Mohamd Amairia	22	12	15:41	45.1 %	0 %	4.9 %	3.3	0.7	0.0	0.7	5.3
Ilyes Fodil	25	10	17:36	41.7 %	31.2 %	45 %	1.6	0.6	0.0	0.8	4.6
Faredj Messaoudi	11	4	17:38	54.7 %	28.6 %	50 %	6.9	0.5	1.5	0.4	8.6
Abdelouaheb Mokhfi	9	7	18:51	44.7 %	27.8 %	71.4 %	4.7	1.2	0.3	0.9	6.6
Mehdi Zaim	21	20	26:34	47.9 %	0 %	41.4 %	10.2	0.5	3.2	0.6	7.6
Redouane Mimouni	15	6	20:59	43.1 %	25 %	73.5 %	3.4	1.3	0.0	0.9	8.8
Mahamadou Kanté	5	4	31:43	57.1 %	21.4 %	83.3 %	7.3	6.7	0.0	3.0	11.7
Riadh Lakeb	6	0	03:22	28.6 %	0 %	0 %	0.3	0.3	0.0	0.2	0.7
Badreddine Chaid	4	0	01:22	–	–	–	–	–	–	–	–
Nabil Saidi	5	4	21:8	50 %	0 %	88.9 %	4.2	1.4	0.0	0.4	5.6
TOTAL				46.5 %	24.8 %	61.1 %	42.5	16.2	10.3	4.2	69.9

Source: afrobasket

=== Super Division Playoffs ===
As of 8 April 2026

Player	GP	GS	MPG	2FG%	3FG%	FT%	RPG	APG	BPG	SPG	PPG
Laamouri Merahi	2	2	39:00+36:31	55.56 %	12.5 %	66.67 %	21.0	10.0	0.0	1.0	25.0
Zakariya Khodja	0	0	00:00	0 %	0 %	0 %	0.0	0.0	0.0	0.0	0.0
Bacim Medjoubi	2	0	17:15+14:00	33.33 %	60 %	50 %	3.0	2.0	0.0	5.0	12.0
Ahmed Boutiba	2	2	34:51+35:36	58.33 %	43.75 %	71.43 %	10.0	5.0	0.0	2.0	40.0
Ramdane Belhadj	2	2	27:54+29:23	40 %	16.67 %	80 %	11.0	5.0	0.0	3.0	14.0
Tarek Redouane	1	0	07:52	50 %	0 %	0 %	1.0	1.0	1.0	0.0	2.0
Mohamd Amairia	2	1	08:04+14:09	60 %	0 %	66.67 %	3.0	2.0	0.0	0.0	8.0
Ilyes Fodil	2	0	05:15+03:50	0 %	0 %	0 %	0.0	1.0	0.0	0.0	0.0
Faredj Messaoudi	0	0	00:00	0 %	0 %	0 %	0.0	0.0	0.0	0.0	0.0
Abdelouaheb Mokhfi	0	0	00:00	0 %	0 %	0 %	0.0	0.0	0.0	0.0	0.0
Mehdi Zaim	2	2	31:56+29:52	100 %	0 %	33.33 %	19.0	0.0	6.0	2.0	16.0
Redouane Mimouni	2	1	35:45+28:47	33.33 %	12.5 %	77.78 %	7.0	2.0	0.0	3.0	8.0
Mahamadou Kanté	0	0	00:00	0 %	0 %	0 %	0.0	0.0	0.0	0.0	0.0
Riadh Lakeb	0	0	00:00	0 %	0 %	0 %	0.0	0.0	0.0	0.0	0.0
Badreddine Chaid	0	0	00:00	0 %	0 %	0 %	0.0	0.0	0.0	0.0	0.0
TOTAL				54.84 %	26.92 %	65.71 %	82	28	6	17	133

Source: afrobasket

=== Algerian Cup ===
As of 17 April 2026

Player	GP	GS	MPG	2FG%	3FG%	FT%	RPG	APG	BPG	SPG	PPG
Laamouri Merahi	2	2	40:01	45 %	50 %	62.5 %	15.0	6.0	1.0	4.0	32.0
Zakariya Khodja	0	0	00:00	0 %	0 %	0 %	0.0	0.0	0.0	0.0	0.0
Bacim Medjoubi	2	0	13:08+19:07	50 %	60 %	50 %	5.0	0.0	2.0	0.0	16.0
Ahmed Boutiba	2	2	29:39+41:08	30.77 %	36.36 %	80 %	8.0	2.0	0.0	2.0	24.0
Ramdane Belhadj	2	1	14:05+39:11	25 %	25 %	70 %	10.0	9.0	0.0	2.0	17.0
Tarek Redouane	1	0	00:57	0 %	0 %	0 %	0.0	0.0	0.0	0.0	0.0
Mohamd Amairia	2	0	10:58+11:43	28.57 %	0 %	0 %	5.0	1.0	0.0	1.0	4.0
Ilyes Fodil	1	0	01:29	0 %	0 %	0 %	0.0	0.0	0.0	0.0	0.0
Faredj Messaoudi	0	0	00:00	0 %	0 %	0 %	0.0	0.0	0.0	0.0	0.0
Abdelouaheb Mokhfi	0	0	00:00	0 %	0 %	0 %	0.0	0.0	0.0	0.0	0.0
Mehdi Zaim	2	2	36:47+33:17	50 %	50 %	50 %	16.0	4.0	10.0	3.0	18.0
Redouane Mimouni	2	2	29:28+35:29	62.5 %	14.29 %	57.14 %	8.0	3.0	0.0	1.0	17.0
Mahamadou Kanté	1	1	28:30	75 %	20 %	0 %	5.0	3.0	0.0	4.0	9.0
Riadh Lakeb	0	0	00:00	0 %	0 %	0 %	0.0	0.0	0.0	0.0	0.0
Badreddine Chaid	0	0	00:00	0 %	0 %	0 %	0.0	0.0	0.0	0.0	0.0
TOTAL				43.75 %	34.09 %	61.11 %	85	28	13	18	134

Source: afrobasket

== USM Alger Women ==
USM Alger
2025–26 season
- President: (Algeria) Fouad Djabrouni
- Head coach: (Algeria) Rachida Belaidi
- National 1: 3rd
- Playoffs: Final four
- Algerian Cup: Winners

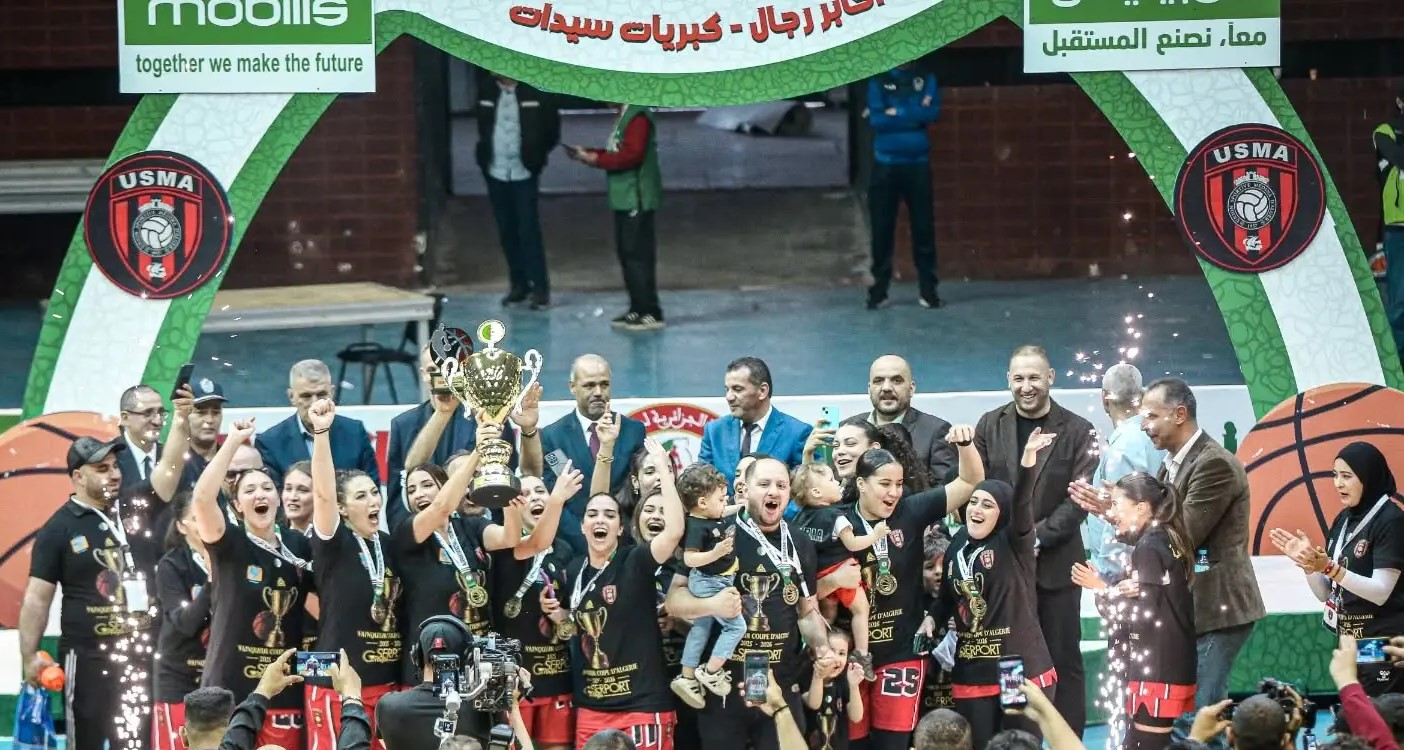
USM Alger women's basketball team wins the 2026 Algerian Cup.

== Overview ==
USM Alger won the 2026 Algerian Women's Basketball Cup after defeating MC Alger 63–57 at the Mohamed-Boudiaf Olympic Complex in Algiers. The Red and Black produced a remarkable comeback after trailing 33–26 at halftime. Dominated during the opening half, USMA raised their level after the break, particularly in the third quarter, before taking control in the final period. USMA’s victory was driven by Yahou Hadjer and Reguig Neyla, who finished as the team’s top scorers with 18 points each. Fantazi Radia also played a decisive role with 14 points and four assists, while Allik Simine added 10 points.

On the boards, Reguig Neyla stood out with 11 rebounds, supported by Fantazi Radia and Ahmin Meriam, who collected eight rebounds each, helping USMA dominate the key moments of the second half. USMA won the first, third, and fourth quarters (15–14, 21–14, and 16–10), while MCA took the second quarter 19–11. With this victory, USMA secured the third Algerian Women's Basketball Cup title in the club’s history after their previous triumphs in 1979 and 1986, ending a forty-year wait for the trophy.

== Women Players ==
=== National 1 roster ===
Note: Flags indicate national team eligibility at FIBA-sanctioned events. Players may hold other non-FIBA nationalities not displayed.

USM Alger roster
Players
Coaches

Pos.	No.	Nat.	Name	Ht.	Wt.	Age
PG	2	(Algeria)	Yahou, Hadjer	1.65 m (5 ft 5 in)		21 – 25 June 2005
SG	3	(Algeria)	Nadhri, Sabrina
G	4	(Algeria)	Fantazi, Radia			34 – 10 August 1992
PF	7	(Algeria)	Benani, Souad
SG	8	(Algeria)	Gharsalah, Yasmin
PG	9	(Algeria)	Adjab, Nawal
PF	11	(Algeria)	Allik, Simine
	13	(Algeria)	Reguig, Neyla (C)	1.85 m (6 ft 1 in)		29 – 11 February 1997
PF	17	(Algeria)	Chikirou, Hanane
G	20	(Algeria)	Ahmin, Meriam	1.80 m (5 ft 11 in)		21 – 20 June 2005
G/F	25	(Algeria)	Meskine, Maria Cerine	1.75 m (5 ft 9 in)		19 – 25 February 2007
	66	(Algeria)	Kardi, Raja Cyrine

Head coach

- (Algeria) Rachida Belaidi

Legend

- (C) Team captain
- (I) Import player
- Injured

- Roster
Updated: May 15, 2026

=== National 1 ===
==== League table ====
Pos	Team	Pld	W	L	GF	GA	GD	Pts	
1	Hussein Dey Marines	26	24	2	0	0	0	50	Advance to play-off
2	GS Cosider	26	23	3	0	0	0	49	Advance to play-off
3	USM Alger	26	21	5	1740	1225	+515	47	Advance to play-off
4	MT Sétif	26	21	5	0	0	0	47	Advance to play-off
5	MC Alger	26	18	8	0	0	0	44	Advance to play-off

First match(es) will be played: May 8, 2026. Source: FABB

==== Results summary ====
Overall						Home					Away				
Pld	W	L	PF	PA	PD	W	L	PF	PA	PD	W	L	PF	PA	PD
26	21	5	1740	1225	+515	11	2	877	579	+298	10	3	863	646	+217

Last updated: May 8, 2026.
Source: Competitive matches

==== Results by round ====
Round	1	2	3	4	5	6	7	8	9	10	11	12	13	14	15	16	17	18	19	20	21	22	23	24	25	26
Ground	A	H	A	H	A	H	A	A	H	A	H	A	H	H	A	H	A	H	A	H	H	A	H	A	H	A
Result	W	W	W	W	W	W	W	W	W	L	W	L	W	W	W	W	W	W	L	W	W	W	L	W	L	W
Position						2	2	2	2	2				3	3		3		3							3

Source: Competitive matches
A = Away; H = Home; W = Win; L = Loss; R = Rest

==== Women Matches ====
All times are local, WAT (UTC+1).

October 3, 2025 1	FS Setifienne	56–71	USM Alger
:	Scoring by quarter: –, –, –, –
		[ Boxscore]

October 10, 2025 2	USM Alger	78–46	RC Bordj Bou Arreridj
16:00	Scoring by quarter: 23–12, 14–16, 24–9, 17–9
		Boxscore

October 17, 2025 3	WR Aïn Benian	37–75	USM Alger
:	Scoring by quarter: –, –, –, –
		[ Boxscore]

October 24, 2025 4	USM Alger	70–40	USA Batna
16:00	Scoring by quarter: 18–9, 12–14, 19–2, 21–15
		Boxscore

November 1, 2025 5	Rouiba CB	28–85	USM Alger
:	Scoring by quarter: –, –, –, –
		[ Boxscore]

November 7, 2025 6	USM Alger	58–56	Hussein Dey Marines
18:30	Scoring by quarter: 14–22, 11–16, 13–10, 20–8
		Boxscore

November 14, 2025 7	CR Ali Mendjeli	33–85	USM Alger
:	Scoring by quarter: –, –, –, –
		[ Boxscore]

November 22, 2025 8	EEI Annaba	53–76	USM Alger
:	Scoring by quarter: –, –, –, –
		[ Boxscore]

November 28, 2025 9	USM Alger	73–50	NB Staouéli
:	Scoring by quarter: –, –, –, –
		[ Boxscore]

December 6, 2025 10	MT Sétif	73–48	USM Alger
:	Scoring by quarter: –, –, –, –
		[ Boxscore]

December 12, 2025 11	USM Alger	63–42	JS Kouba
:	Scoring by quarter: –, –, –, –
		[ Boxscore]

December 19, 2025 12	GS Cosider	75–53	USM Alger
:	Scoring by quarter: –, –, –, –
		[ Boxscore]

December 26, 2025 13	USM Alger	69–55	MC Alger
:	Scoring by quarter: –, –, –, –
		[ Boxscore]

January 16, 2026 14	USM Alger	48–35	FS Setifienne
:	Scoring by quarter: –, –, –, –
		[ Boxscore]

January 23, 2026 15	RC Bordj Bou Arreridj	51–64	USM Alger
:	Scoring by quarter: –, –, –, –
		[ Boxscore]

February 6, 2026 16	USM Alger	72–30	WR Aïn Benian
15:00	Scoring by quarter: 17–5, 11–8, 18–9, 26–8
		Boxscore

February 20, 2026 17	USA Batna	33–69	USM Alger
21:18	Scoring by quarter: 6–21, 11–19, 8–18, 8–11
		Boxscore

February 28, 2026 18	USM Alger	70–27	Rouiba CB
21:30	Scoring by quarter: 13–10, 22–11, 16–1, 19–5
		Boxscore

March 6, 2026 19	Hussein Dey Marines	58–55	USM Alger
:	Scoring by quarter: –, –, –, –
		[ Boxscore]

March 13, 2026 20	USM Alger	98–38	CR Ali Mendjeli
21:00	Scoring by quarter: 26–8, 21–13, 33–10, 18–7
		Boxscore

April 3, 2026 21	USM Alger	71–32	EEI Annaba
:	Scoring by quarter: –, –, –, –
		[ Boxscore]

April 11, 2026 22	NB Staouéli	51–53(OT)	USM Alger
16:00	Scoring by quarter: 18–4, 6–15, 15–13, 3–10, Overtime: 9–11
		Boxscore

April 17, 2026 23	USM Alger	50–59	MT Sétif
:	Scoring by quarter: –, –, –, –
		[ Boxscore]

April 21, 2026 24	JS Kouba	47–66	USM Alger
19:30	Scoring by quarter: 18–15, 12–19, 5–15, 12–17
		Boxscore

April 25, 2026 25	USM Alger	57–69	GS Cosider
18:00	Scoring by quarter: 13–27, 11–13, 22–17, 11–12
		Boxscore

May 8, 2026 26	MC Alger	51–63	USM Alger
17:30	Scoring by quarter: 10–18, 13–12, 13–17, 15–16
		Boxscore

==== National 1 Playoffs Group 1 ====
The 2025–26 Algerian Women's National Basketball League title tournament began on 22 May 2026 in Algiers, featuring eight clubs divided into two groups, according to the schedule announced by the Algerian Basketball Federation. The competition serves as the final stage of the Algerian Women's National Basketball League season to determine the national champion. The participating clubs were GS Cosider (defending champions), Hussein Dey Marines, MT Sétif, USM Alger, MC Alger, US Batna, JF Kouba and NB Staouéli, the latter qualifying through the play-off tournament.

The tournament was held from 22 to 24 May at the Hydra and El Kharrouba halls in a single round-robin format. The top two teams from each group advanced to the final tournament, which determines the Algerian champion for the 2025–26 season. Group A, played at the Hydra hall, included GS Cosider, MT Sétif, US Batna and JF Kouba. Group B, played at the El Kharrouba hall, featured USM Alger, MC Alger, Hussein Dey Marines and NB Staouéli.

Playoffs Group 1 table
Pos	Team	Pld	W	L	GF	GA	GD	Pts	
1	Hussein Dey Marines	3	3	0	189	132	+57	6	Qualification to the Semi-finals
2	USM Alger	3	2	1	145	145	0	5	Qualification to the Semi-finals
3	MC Alger	3	1	2	160	171	−11	4	
4	NB Staouéli	3	0	3	128	174	−46	3	

First match(es) will be played: May 24, 2026. Source: FABB

May 22, 2026 Round 1	USM Alger	50–46	MC Alger	Hussein Dey
15:00	Scoring by quarter: 20–8, 11–9, 10–17, 9–12
	Pts: Hadjer Yahou 13; Rebs: Simine Allik, Naila Reguig 8 Asts: Hanane Chikirou 4	Boxscore	Pts: Fouzia Terrak 11; Rebs: Soulef Melkia 10; Asts: Maria Aliane 3	Arena: Salle OMS El Magharia; Referees: Kahalou Adel, Loutis Hakim, Labani Mbarka

May 23, 2026 Round 2	Hussein Dey Marines	56–46	USM Alger	Hussein Dey
17:00	Scoring by quarter: 17–15, 11–12, 12–11, 16–8
	Pts: Aicha Benouda 19; Rebs: Aicha Benouda, Ikram Nouasria 8 Asts: Aicha Benouda 4	Boxscore	Pts: Cerine Allik 10; Rebs: Naila Reguig 10; Asts: Meriem Ahmine 3	Arena: Salle OMS El Magharia; Attendance: 390; Referees: Kahalou Adel, Rahali Mohamed, Kahil Yacine

May 24, 2026 Round 3	USM Alger	49–43	NB Staouéli	Hussein Dey
15:00	Scoring by quarter: 19–10, 5–11, 12–10, 13–12
	Pts: Hanane Chikirou 12; Rebs: Maria Cerine Meskine 9 Asts: Hanane Chikirou 7	Boxscore	Pts: Randa Boutadjine 16; Rebs: Imen Aissa 10; Asts: Randa Boutadjine, Hania Atmani 2	Arena: Salle OMS El Magharia; Referees: Ferhani A, Zahaf A, Ressad Lisa

==== Final four ====
Final four table
Pos	Team	Pld	W	L	GF	GA	GD	Pts	
1	Hussein Dey Marines	3	2	1	146	144	+2	5	Champions
2	MT Sétif	3	2	1	188	174	+14	5	
3	GS Cosider	3	1	2	188	169	+19	4	
4	USM Alger	3	1	2	157	192	−35	4	

First match(es) will be played: June 3, 2026. Source: FABB

June 1, 2026 Round 1	MT Sétif	69–66	USM Alger	Dély Ibrahim, Algiers
17:00	Scoring by quarter: 18–13, 21–25, 18–13, 12–15
	Pts: Samah Keddache 18; Rebs: Amina Dounia Toumi 11; Asts: Marlene Ngobeleza Matoko 7	Boxscore	Pts: Cerine Allik 18; Rebs: Naila Reguig 9 Asts: Hadjer Yahou 8	Arena: La Coupole d'Alger Arena; Attendance: 200; Referees: Harrache Mouaadh, Fouchene Abderrzak, Fritah Mohamed Anis

June 2, 2026 Round 2	USM Alger	47–81	GS Cosider	Dély Ibrahim, Algiers
17:00	Scoring by quarter: 11–27, 6–22, 17–15, 13–17
	Pts: Naila Reguig 12; Rebs: Naila Reguig, Cerine Allik 8 Asts: Cerine Allik 4	Boxscore	Pts: Nesrine Taibi 19; Rebs: Nesrine Taibi 15; Asts: Nesrine Taibi 5	Arena: La Coupole d'Alger Arena; Attendance: 200; Referees: Zennagui Nandjet, Zaza Choubila, Fritah Mohammed Anis

June 3, 2026 Round 3	Hussein Dey Marines	42–44	USM Alger	Dély Ibrahim, Algiers
19:00	Scoring by quarter: 7–12, 9–5, 9–13, 17–14
	Pts: Rania Albane 14; Rebs: Rania Albane 14; Asts: Sofia Saidani 2	Boxscore	Pts: Naila Reguig 15; Rebs: Naila Reguig, Meriem Ahmine 10; Asts: Hadjer Yahou 3	Arena: La Coupole d'Alger Arena; Attendance: 800; Referees: Zenagui Nadjet, Ghaib Fateh, Zaaza Choubila

=== Algerian Women's Basketball Cup ===
Mar 27, 2026 Quarter-finals	USM Alger	vs.	RC Bordj Bou Arreridj
:	Scoring by quarter: –, –, –, –
		[ Boxscore]

May 1, 2026 Semi-finals	USM Alger	66–53	GS Cosider
17:00	Scoring by quarter: 12–13, 14–10, 21–13, 19–17
		Boxscore

May 16, 2026 Final	MC Alger	57–63	USM Alger	Dély Ibrahim, Algiers
14:45	Scoring by quarter: 14–15, 19–11, 14–21, 10–16
TV6	Pts: Soulef Malkia 12; Rebs: Soulef Malkia 15; Asts: Soulef Malkia, Lydia Hiouani 4	Boxscore	Pts: Hadjer Yahou, Neyla Reguig 18; Rebs: Neyla Reguig 11; Asts: Radia Fantazi 4	Arena: La Coupole d'Alger Arena; Attendance: 2500; Referees: Zenagui Nadjet, Ainouz Celya, Zaaza Choubeyla
