= Narbonne Flour Mill =

Flour mill in Hussein Dey, Algeria

- Minoterie Narbonne
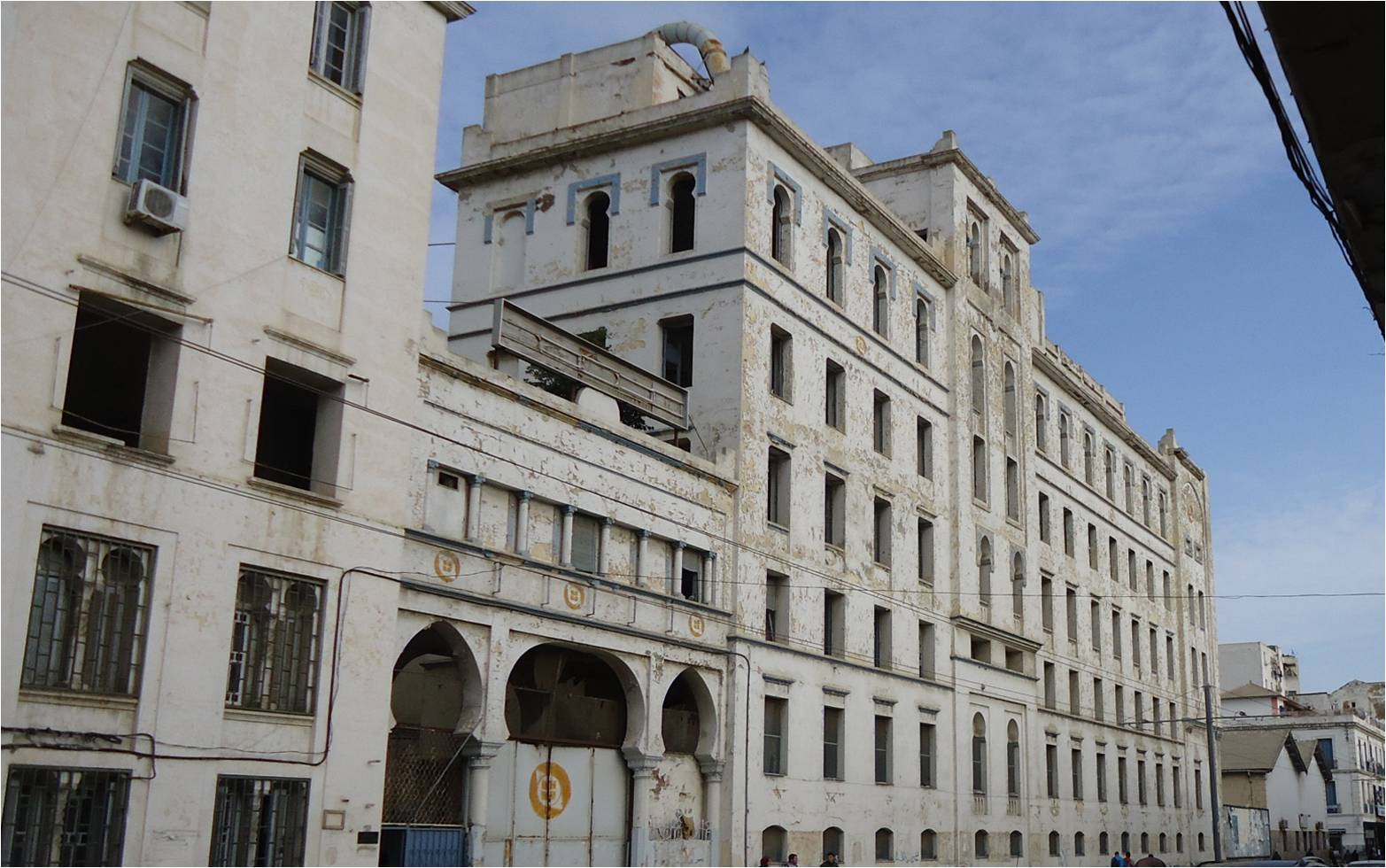
- Interactive map of Narbonne Flour Mill

General information
- Type: Grist mill
- Location: Rue Tripoli, Hussein Dey, Algiers Province, Algeria
- Coordinates: 36°44′40″N 3°05′42″E
- Owner: People's Municipal Assembly

Narbonne Flour Mill is a flour mill on Tripoli Street in the Hussein Dey commune in the Algiers province of Algeria. It was founded by Louis-Gonzague Narbonne in 1864.

== History ==
The building of the first mill was built in 1862 by Louis-Gonzague Narbonne (1828–1893). Equipped with eight units, the mill could process 350–400 quintals of wheat per day. The mill was built in several phases, up until 1945. After the Algerian War, the mill was nationalised into SN Sempac (Société nationale des semouleries, meuneries, fabriques de pâtes alimentaires et couscous; 'National company of semolina, flour, pasta and couscous factories'). Not long after that, it was restructured into several enterprises within the agricultural industry. In the 21st century, the building has been owned by the People's Municipal Assembly of Hussein Dey.

In June, 1941, a fire started in the machine hall, causing injuries and damages to an estimated sum of, at the time, 300,000 francs.

In June, 2010, an expert group within the Ministry of housing, urbanism and the city expressed that the building would be demolished. This decision was delayed in 2013, with the realization of the Algiers tramway. In 2021, the demolition of the building was revived. The organization Inventaire citoyen du patrimoine have launched an appeal on their platforms.
