= 2025–26 Algerian Women's Basketball Championship =

National 1
- Season: 2025–26
- Duration: October 3, 2025 – May 8, 2026 (play-in tournament); 22 – 24 May 2026 (play-offs); 1 – 3 June 2026 (Final four)
- Teams: 14

Regular season
- Top seed: Hussein Dey Marines

Finals
- Champions: Hussein Dey Marines
- Runners-up: MT Sétif
- All statistics correct as of May 24, 2026.

The 2025–26 National 1 (64th edition), Algeria's top tier basketball club competition, ran from October 3, 2025.

== Review ==
Union Sportive Aurassienne Batna was among the clubs concerned by the new reforms announced by the Algerian Basketball Federation ahead of the 2025–26 season. During an Extraordinary General Assembly scheduled for August 30, 2025, in Ben Aknoun, FABB members were set to discuss several regulatory amendments and new competition formats aimed at reviving Algerian basketball. Under the leadership of Mehdi Oucif, the federation focused on restructuring the sport through: the development of youth training programs; the improvement of national competitions; greater involvement of amateur and professional clubs; the introduction of new organizational measures.

The FABB also highlighted the difficulties faced by many Algerian clubs, including the lack of training facilities and financial constraints that contributed to the decline of national basketball. Federation officials therefore urged clubs, including Union Sportive Aurassienne Batna, to invest more in youth development and grassroots training programs.

The Algerian Basketball Federation (FABB) announced that the 2025–26 Algerian women's basketball season will officially begin on the weekend of 12–13 September 2025, following decisions adopted during the latest Federal Bureau meeting. As part of the preparations for the new season, the federation confirmed that the Algerian Women's Super Cup final will be played on 6 September 2025.

The FABB also emphasized its intention to diversify the preparation venues of the women's national team, stating that future training camps will no longer be held exclusively in Algiers, but across different regions of the country in order to benefit from the specific conditions of each area. In addition, the Federal Bureau approved a new regulation allowing women's clubs affiliated with the federation to sign and field up to two foreign players per team during the 2025–26 season.

== Venues and locations ==
=== Promotion and relegation (pre-season) ===
Locations of teams for the 2025–26 Algerian Women's Basketball Championship
Algiers Province clubs

Promoted from National 2

Team	Home city	Arena
MC Alger	Hydra	Salle OMS Abdelaziz Ben Tifour
NB Staouéli	Staoueli	Salle OMS de Staouéli
Rouiba CB	Rouïba	Salle OMS Mohamed Kadiri
MT Sétif	Sétif	Salle 8 Mai 1945
USM Alger	Algiers	Salle OMS Mourad Boukechoura
FS Setifienne	Sétif	Salle 8 Mai 1945
RC Bordj Bou Arreridj	Bordj Bou Arreridj	
WR Aïn Benian	Aïn Bénian	
USA Batna		
Hussein Dey Marines		
CR Ali Mendjeli		
EEI Annaba	Annaba	
JF Kouba	Kouba	
GS Cosider		

== Regular season ==
=== League table ===
Pos	Team	Pld	W	L	GF	GA	GD	Pts	
1	Hussein Dey Marines	26	24	2	0	0	0	50	Advance to play-off
2	GS Cosider	26	23	3	0	0	0	49	Advance to play-off
3	USM Alger	26	21	5	1740	1225	+515	47	Advance to play-off
4	MT Sétif	26	21	5	0	0	0	47	Advance to play-off
5	MC Alger	26	18	8	0	0	0	44	Advance to play-off
6	USA Batna	26	15	11	0	0	0	41	Advance to play-off
7	JF Kouba	26	15	11	0	0	0	41	Advance to Play-in
8	NB Staouéli	25	11	14	0	0	0	36	Advance to Play-in
9	FS Setifienne	26	9	17	0	0	0	35	Advance to Play-in
10	RC Bordj Bou Arreridj	25	8	17	0	0	0	33	Advance to Play-in
11	WR Aïn Benian	25	7	18	0	0	0	32	Advance to Play-down
12	EEI Annaba	25	4	21	0	0	0	29	Advance to Play-down
13	Rouiba CB	25	2	23	0	0	0	27	Advance to Play-down
14	CR Ali Mendjeli	26	2	24	0	0	0	28	Advance to Play-down

First match(es) will be played: May 8, 2026. Source: FABB

== Play-offs ==
The 2025–26 Algerian Women's National Basketball League title tournament began on 22 May 2026 in Algiers, featuring eight clubs divided into two groups, according to the schedule announced by the Algerian Basketball Federation. The competition serves as the final stage of the Algerian Women's National Basketball League season to determine the national champion. The participating clubs were GS Cosider (defending champions), Hussein Dey Marines, MT Sétif, USM Alger, MC Alger, US Batna, JF Kouba and NB Staouéli, the latter qualifying through the play-off tournament.

The tournament was held from 22 to 24 May at the Hydra and El Kharrouba halls in a single round-robin format. The top two teams from each group advanced to the final tournament, which determines the Algerian champion for the 2025–26 season. Group A, played at the Hydra hall, included GS Cosider, MT Sétif, US Batna and JF Kouba. Group B, played at the El Kharrouba hall, featured USM Alger, MC Alger, Hussein Dey Marines and NB Staouéli.

=== Playoffs Group 1 ===
Pos	Team	Pld	W	L	GF	GA	GD	Pts	
1	Hussein Dey Marines	3	3	0	189	132	+57	6	Qualification to the Semi-finals
2	USM Alger	3	2	1	145	145	0	5	Qualification to the Semi-finals
3	MC Alger	3	1	2	160	171	−11	4	
4	NB Staouéli	3	0	3	128	174	−46	3	

First match(es) will be played: May 24, 2026. Source: FABB

May 22, 2026 Round 1	USM Alger	50–46	MC Alger	Hussein Dey
15:00	Scoring by quarter: 20–8, 11–9, 10–17, 9–12
	Pts: Hadjer Yahou 13; Rebs: Simine Allik, Naila Reguig 8 Asts: Hanane Chikirou 4	Boxscore	Pts: Fouzia Terrak 11; Rebs: Soulef Melkia 10; Asts: Maria Aliane 3	Arena: Salle OMS El Magharia; Referees: Kahalou Adel, Loutis Hakim, Labani Mbarka

May 22, 2026 Round 1	Hussein Dey Marines	68–29	NB Staouéli	Hussein Dey
17:00	Scoring by quarter: 18–3, 18–4, 12–14, 20–8
	Pts: Cyrine Zaoui 12; Rebs: Cyrine Zaoui 12; Asts: Aicha Benouda 5	Boxscore	Pts: Wissal Djebrane 14; Rebs: Laetitia Maarouf 7 Asts: Four players 1	Arena: Salle OMS El Magharia; Attendance: 300; Referees: Osman sidali, Zahaf Mohammed, Labani Mbarka

May 23, 2026 Round 2	NB Staouéli	56–57	MC Alger	Hussein Dey
15:00	Scoring by quarter: 14–12, 19–12, 11–19, 12–14
	Pts: Randa Boutadjine 25; Rebs: Laetitia Maarouf 11; Asts: Wissal Djebrane 4	Boxscore	Pts: Fouzia Terrak 21; Rebs: Cherifa Sadat 11; Asts: Fouzia Terrak 5	Arena: Salle OMS El Magharia; Referees: Bouarifi Mohamed, Laoubi Imad, Ainouz Celia

May 23, 2026 Round 2	Hussein Dey Marines	56–46	USM Alger	Hussein Dey
17:00	Scoring by quarter: 17–15, 11–12, 12–11, 16–8
	Pts: Aicha Benouda 19; Rebs: Aicha Benouda, Ikram Nouasria 8 Asts: Aicha Benouda 4	Boxscore	Pts: Cerine Allik 10; Rebs: Naila Reguig 10; Asts: Meriem Ahmine 3	Arena: Salle OMS El Magharia; Attendance: 390; Referees: Kahalou Adel, Rahali Mohamed, Kahil Yacine

May 24, 2026 Round 3	USM Alger	49–43	NB Staouéli	Hussein Dey
15:00	Scoring by quarter: 19–10, 5–11, 12–10, 13–12
	Pts: Hanane Chikirou 12; Rebs: Maria Cerine Meskine 9 Asts: Hanane Chikirou 7	Boxscore	Pts: Randa Boutadjine 16; Rebs: Imen Aissa 10; Asts: Randa Boutadjine, Hania Atmani 2	Arena: Salle OMS El Magharia; Referees: Ferhani A, Zahaf A, Ressad Lisa

May 24, 2026 Round 3	MC Alger	57–65	Hussein Dey Marines	Hussein Dey
17:00	Scoring by quarter: 16–16, 6–18, 19–15, 16–16
	Pts: Soulef Melkia 23; Rebs: Cherifa Sadat 10; Asts: Soulef Melkia 4	Boxscore	Pts: Aicha Benouda 14; Rebs: Ikram Nouasria 8 Asts: Rania Albane 5	Arena: Salle OMS El Magharia; Attendance: 300; Referees: Kahalou Adel, Ferhani Brahimi, Ghaib Fateh

=== Playoffs Group 2 ===
Pos	Team	Pld	W	L	GF	GA	GD	Pts	
1	GS Cosider	3	2	1	186	129	+57	5	Qualification to the Semi-finals
2	MT Sétif	3	2	1	184	169	+15	5	Qualification to the Semi-finals
3	JF Kouba	3	1	2	160	193	−33	4	
4	USA Batna	3	1	2	162	201	−39	4	

First match(es) will be played: May 24, 2026. Source: FABB

May 22, 2026 Round 1	MT Sétif	62–66	USA Batna	Hydra
16:00	Scoring by quarter: 15–21, 13–17, 14–14, 20–14
	Pts: Samah Keddache 19; Rebs: Dounia Toumi, Kevine Kabongo 11; Asts: Sabine Drici 7	Boxscore	Pts: Selsabil Belmihoub 21; Rebs: Selsabil Belmihoub, Nadine Bouzaouaid 13; Asts: Asma Djaballah 12	Arena: Salle OMS Abdelaziz Ben Tifour; Attendance: 200; Referees: Ferhani Brahim, Ghaib Fateh, Dahmani Rezki

May 22, 2026 Round 1	GS Cosider	68–36	JF Kouba	Hydra
18:00	Scoring by quarter: 21–12, 17–17, 14–5, 16–2
	Pts: Hind Mouna Djelloul 15; Rebs: Taibi Nesrine 19; Asts: Taibi Nesrine 7	Boxscore	Pts: Nour El Houda Bourkaib 12; Rebs: Meriem Merzake 8 Asts: Three players 2	Arena: Salle OMS Abdelaziz Ben Tifour; Attendance: 400; Referees: Bouarifi Mohamed, Fouchene Abdrrezak, Laoubi Mohamed Imed

May 23, 2026 Round 2	JF Kouba	69–61	USA Batna	Hydra
16:00	Scoring by quarter: 12–10, 16–21, 22–17, 19–13
	Pts: Meriem Merzkane 17; Rebs: Meriem Mekideche 13; Asts: Imene Chemaa 7	Boxscore	Pts: Asma Djaballah 18; Rebs: Astou Fall 18; Asts: Asma Djaballah, Nadine Bouzaouaid 4	Arena: Salle OMS Abdelaziz Ben Tifour; Attendance: 300; Referees: Ferhani Brahim, Osmane Sidali, Ressad Liza

May 23, 2026 Round 2	GS Cosider	48–58	MT Sétif	Hydra
18:00	Scoring by quarter: 10–15, 8–17, 19–13, 11–13
	Pts: Manel Taka 19; Rebs: Taibi Nesrine 10; Asts: Hind Mouna Djelloul 5	Boxscore	Pts: Marlene Ngobeleza Matoko 12; Rebs: Kevine Kabongo 14; Asts: Sabine Drici 4	Arena: Salle OMS Abdelaziz Ben Tifour; Attendance: 400; Referees: Ferhani Brahim, Fouchene Abderrezak, Ressad Liza

May 24, 2026 Round 3	MT Sétif	64–55	JF Kouba	Hydra
14:00	Scoring by quarter: 21–11, 15–12, 12–15, 16–17
	Pts: Sabine Drici, Marlene Matoko 18; Rebs: Amina Dounia Toumi 15; Asts: Sabine Drici 8	Boxscore	Pts: Nour El Houda Bourkaib 14; Rebs: Jihane Brahmia 8 Asts: Nour El Houda Bourkaib, Meriem Merzkane 3	Arena: Salle OMS Abdelaziz Ben Tifour; Attendance: 400; Referees: Bouarifi Mohamed, Laoubi Imed, Ainouz Celya

May 24, 2026 Round 3	USA Batna	35–70	GS Cosider	Hydra
16:00	Scoring by quarter: 9–20, 11–19, 11–11, 4–20
	Pts: Asma Djaballah 15; Rebs: Asma Djaballah, Imene Bediaf 10; Asts: Asma Djaballah 3	Boxscore	Pts: Yasmine Yamna Mekhloufi 14; Rebs: Taibi Nesrine 14; Asts: Yasmine Yamna Mekhloufi, Badiaa Kellal 4	Arena: Salle OMS Abdelaziz Ben Tifour; Attendance: 500; Referees: Bouarifi Mohamed, Kahil Yacine, Ainouz Celya

=== Final four ===
The final Play-offs tournament of the 2025–26 National 1 concluded on 10 June 2026 at the Mohamed Boudiaf Olympic Complex, with Hussein-Dey Marines winning their first national title under the club's current name. Despite losing 44–42 to USM Alger in the third and final round of the Play-offs, Hussein-Dey Marines secured the championship thanks to victories over GS Cosider (52–51) and MT Sétif (52–49 after overtime). Coached by Mokrane Benabbes, the Marines finished the tournament with two wins and one defeat, collecting five points and topping the final standings.

The title carries special significance as it is the first national championship won under the Hussein-Dey Marines identity. However, women's basketball teams from Hussein Dey had previously won four Algerian league titles under the name NA Hussein-Dey, in 1989, 1990, 1995 and 1996. In the other decisive match, MT Sétif defeated GS Cosider 70–56 after overturning a 33–27 half-time deficit. The Sétif side finished runners-up, notably dominating the final quarter 24–10.

Pos	Team	Pld	W	L	GF	GA	GD	Pts	
1	Hussein Dey Marines	3	2	1	146	144	+2	5	Champions
2	MT Sétif	3	2	1	188	174	+14	5	
3	GS Cosider	3	1	2	188	169	+19	4	
4	USM Alger	3	1	2	157	192	−35	4	

First match(es) will be played: June 3, 2026. Source: FABB

June 1, 2026 Round 1	MT Sétif	69–66	USM Alger
17:00	Scoring by quarter: 18–13, 21–25, 18–13, 12–15
	Pts: Samah Keddache 18; Rebs: Amina Dounia Toumi 11; Asts: Marlene Ngobeleza Matoko 7	Boxscore	Pts: Cerine Allik 18; Rebs: Naila Reguig 9 Asts: Hadjer Yahou 8	Arena: La Coupole d'Alger Arena, Dély Ibrahim, Algiers; Attendance: 200; Referees: Harrache Mouaadh, Fouchene Abderrzak, Fritah Mohamed Anis

May 30, 2026 Round 1	Hussein Dey Marines	52–51	GS Cosider
19:00	Scoring by quarter: 9–18, 10–8, 17–9, 16–16
	Pts: Sofia Saidani 19; Rebs: Ibtisseme Kriket 10; Asts: Aicha Benouda, Sofia Saidani 4	Boxscore	Pts: Nesrine Taibi 12; Rebs: Nesrine Taibi 11; Asts: Nesrine Taibi 4	Arena: La Coupole d'Alger Arena, Dély Ibrahim, Algiers; Attendance: 300; Referees: Bennani Anis, Loutis Hakim, Ainouz Celya

June 2, 2026 Round 2	USM Alger	47–81	GS Cosider
17:00	Scoring by quarter: 11–27, 6–22, 17–15, 13–17
	Pts: Naila Reguig 12; Rebs: Naila Reguig, Cerine Allik 8 Asts: Cerine Allik 4	Boxscore	Pts: Nesrine Taibi 19; Rebs: Nesrine Taibi 15; Asts: Nesrine Taibi 5	Arena: La Coupole d'Alger Arena, Dély Ibrahim, Algiers; Attendance: 200; Referees: Zennagui Nandjet, Zaza Choubila, Fritah Mohammed Anis

June 2, 2026 Round 2	MT Sétif	49–52(OT)	Hussein Dey Marines
19:00	Scoring by quarter: 11–13, 16–21, 9–11, 9–0, Overtime: 4–7
	Pts: Samah Keddache 16; Rebs: Amina Dounia Toumi 17; Asts: Samah Keddache 3	Boxscore	Pts: Rania Albane 18; Rebs: Ikram Nouasria 8 Asts: Sofia Saidani, Rania Albane 4	Arena: La Coupole d'Alger Arena, Dély Ibrahim, Algiers; Attendance: 500; Referees: Amrouni Mouna, Zahaf Mohamed, Ressad Liza

June 3, 2026 Round 3	MT Sétif	70–56	GS Cosider
17:00	Scoring by quarter: 15–17, 12–16, 19–13, 24–10
	Pts: Amina Dounia Toumi 22; Rebs: Amina Dounia Toumi 17; Asts: Sabine Drici 5	Boxscore	Pts: Hind Mouna Djelloul 14; Rebs: Nesrine Taibi 12; Asts: Nesrine Taibi 4	Arena: La Coupole d'Alger Arena, Dély Ibrahim, Algiers; Attendance: 300; Referees: Amrouni Mounia, Fouchene Abderrezak, Ghaib Fateh

June 3, 2026 Round 3	Hussein Dey Marines	42–44	USM Alger
19:00	Scoring by quarter: 7–12, 9–5, 9–13, 17–14
	Pts: Rania Albane 14; Rebs: Rania Albane 14; Asts: Sofia Saidani 2	Boxscore	Pts: Naila Reguig 15; Rebs: Naila Reguig, Meriem Ahmine 10; Asts: Hadjer Yahou 3	Arena: La Coupole d'Alger Arena, Dély Ibrahim, Algiers; Attendance: 800; Referees: Zenagui Nadjet, Ghaib Fateh, Zaaza Choubila
