= Abderrahmane Alane =

Algerian footballer (1970–2026)

Personal information
- Date of birth: 23 August 1970
- Place of birth: Algiers, Algeria
- Date of death: 13 August 2026 (aged 55)
- Position: Goalkeeper

Youth career
- ?–1990: MC Alger

Senior career*
Years	Team	Apps	(Gls)
1990–1994	MC Alger		(0)
1994–1996	JS Kabylie		(0)
1996–1997	MC Alger		(0)
1997–1998	WA Boufarik		(0)
1998–2000	USM Alger		(0)
Total			(0)

International career
1998	Algeria	2	(0)
- * Club domestic league appearances and goals

Abderrahmane Alane (Arabic: عبد الرحمان علان; 23 August 1970 – 13 August 2026) was an Algerian footballer who played as a goalkeeper.

Alane notably won the 1994–95 Algerian Championnat National and the 1995 African Cup Winners' Cup with JS Kabylie. He was also the winner of the 1999 Algerian Cup with USM Alger. He appeared in two matches for the Algerian national team in 1998.

Alane died on 13 August 2026, at the age of 55.
