= Algazira Stadium =

Stadium in Wad Madani, Sudan

- Full name: Algazira Stadium
- Location: Wad Madani, Sudan
- Capacity: 15,000

Tenant
- Al-Ahli

Algazira Stadium, also spelled Al-Jazeera Stadium, is a multi-use stadium in Wad Madani, Sudan. It is currently used mostly for football matches, on club level by Al-Ahli of the Sudan Premier League. The stadium has a capacity of 15,000 spectators.
