= Siaka Coulibaly =

Burkinabé footballer

Personal information
- Date of birth: 10 March 1972 (age 54)
- Position: Goalkeeper

Senior career*
Years	Team	Apps	(Gls)
1995–2004	US des Forces Armées		
1999–2000	→ USM Alger (loan)		
2004–2006	Rail Club Kadiogo		
2007–2008	Étoile Filante de Ouagadougou		

International career
1996–2005	Burkina Faso	6	(0)
- * Club domestic league appearances and goals

Siaka Coulibaly (born 10 March 1972) is a Burkinabé footballer. He played in six matches for the Burkina Faso national football team from 1996 to 2005. He was also named in Burkina Faso's squad for the 1996 African Cup of Nations tournament.
