= 1998–99 Algerian Cup =

- Stade du 5 Juillet hosted the final

Tournament details
- Country: Algeria

Final positions
- Champions: USM Alger (4th title)
- Runners-up: JS Kabylie

The 1998–99 Algerian Cup was the 34th edition of the Algerian Cup. USM Alger won the Cup by defeating JS Kabylie 2–0. It was USM Alger fourth Algerian Cup in its history.

== Round of 64 ==
Tie no	Home team	Score	Away team	Attendance
1	ASO Chlef	2–4	USM Annaba	4 March 1999, 16:00
2	JSM Tiaret	0–1	USM Alger	4 March 1999, 16:00
3	HB Chelghoum Laid	2–1	SA Mohammadia	4 March 1999, 16:00
4	MC Saida	2–1	AS Ain M'lila	4 March 1999, 16:00
5	RC Relizane	3–1	MC El Bayadh	4 March 1999, 16:00
6	ES Ghozlane	1–3 (a)	IRBSM Ben Ali	4 March 1999, 16:00
7	CRB Mecheria	1–2 (a)	IRB Hadjout	4 March 1999, 16:00
8	NRB Gouray	2–1	USM Ain Beida	4 March 1999, 16:00
9	USM El Harrach	0–1 (a)	MB Tlydjene	4 March 1999, 16:00
10	IR Hussein Dey	1–2	IR Ouled Nail	4 March 1999, 16:00
11	ES Setif	0–0	JSM Bejaia	4 March 1999, 16:00
12	NA Hussein Dey	2–1	JSM Tébessa	4 March 1999, 16:00
13	NRB Touggourt	1–2	CR Beni Thour	4 March 1999, 16:00
14	RC Kouba	2–1	AS Maghnia	4 March 1999, 16:00
15	CRB Ain Fakroun	2–1 (a)	IRB Nezla	4 March 1999, 16:00
16	MC Oran	0–0	ASM Oran	4 March 1999, 16:00
17	CS Constantine	1–2 (a)	JSM Skikda	4 March 1999, 16:00
18	CA Batna	3–0	IRM Bel-Abbes	4 March 1999, 16:00
19	OMR El Annasser	0–1	ES Mostaganem	4 March 1999, 16:00
20	MC El Eulma	1–2	GC Mascara	4 March 1999, 16:00
21	MC Alger	2–1	US Chaouia	4 March 1999, 16:00
22	WA Tlemcen	1–0	MO Constantine	4 March 1999, 16:00
23	CB Mila	0–0	NARB Reghaia	4 March 1999, 16:00
24	FS Mostaganem	2–1	US Bechar Djedid	4 March 1999, 16:00
25	IS Tighenif	1–4	JS Bordj Menaiel	4 March 1999, 16:00
26	USM Setif	0–2	CR Belouizdad	4 March 1999, 16:00
27	CS Souk Naamame	0–0	CRB Tamalous	4 March 1999, 16:00
28	ASBB Arreridj	1–1	ES Ben-Aknoun	4 March 1999, 16:00
29	WA Boufarik	0–1	USM Blida	4 March 1999, 16:00
30	USM Oran	0–0	CRE Constantine	4 March 1999, 16:00
31	ESM Boudouaou	0–0	USM Khenchela	4 March 1999, 16:00
32	CA Kouba	0–2	JS Kabylie	4 March 1999, 16:00

== Round of 32 ==
Tie no	Home team	Score	Away team	Attendance
1	WA Tlemcen	1–0	ES Ben-Aknoun	22 March 1999, 16:00
2	FS Mostaganem	0–3	USM Alger	22 March 1999, 16:00
3	USM Oran	2–3	CB Mila	22 March 1999, 16:00
4	IR Ouled Nail	0–0	IRBSM Ben Ali	22 March 1999, 16:00
5	USM Blida	4–0	CS Souk Naamame	22 March 1999, 16:00
6	JS Kabylie	3–0	NRB Gouray	22 March 1999, 16:00
7	USM Khenchela	2–4	GC Mascara	22 March 1999, 16:00
8	ASM Oran	1–2	ES Mostaganem	22 March 1999, 16:00
9	MB Tlydjene	3–2	CRB Ain Fakroun	22 March 1999, 16:00
10	JSM Skikda	1–5	HB Chelghoum Laid	22 March 1999, 16:00
11	CR Beni Thour	0–4	MC Alger	22 March 1999, 16:00
12	JSM Bejaia	0–2	CR Belouizdad	22 March 1999, 16:00
13	IRB Hadjout	0–2	RC Kouba	22 March 1999, 16:00
14	MC Saida	1–0	USM Annaba	22 March 1999, 16:00
15	RC Relizane	1–0	JS Bordj Menaiel	22 March 1999, 16:00
16	CA Batna	1–2	NA Hussein Dey	22 March 1999, 16:00

== Round of 16 ==
Tie no	Home team	Score	Away team	Attendance
1	NA Hussein Dey	4–2	RC Relizane	19 April 1999, 15:00
2	USM Blida	0–4	USM Alger	19 April 1999, 15:00
3	JS Kabylie	2–0	CB Mila	19 April 1999, 15:00
4	MC Saïda	0–2	MC Alger	19 April 1999, 15:00
5	CR Belouizdad	1–0 (a)	HB Chelghoum Laïd	19 April 1999, 15:00
6	GC Mascara	2–4	IR Ouled Naïl	19 April 1999, 15:00
7	RC Kouba	1–3	MB Tlydjene	19 April 1999, 15:00
8	WA Tlemcen	1–0	ES Mostaganem	26 April 1999, 15:00

== Quarter-finals ==
Tie no	Home team	First Leg	Second Leg	Away team	Attendance
1	IR Ouled Nail	0–0	0–4	MC Alger	29 April 1999 – 6 May 1999
2	NA Hussein Dey	2–1	1–1	CR Belouizdad	29 April 1999 – 6 May 1999
3	JS Kabylie	4–1	0–1	MB Tlydjene	29 April 1999 – 6 May 1999
4	USM Alger	4–0	0–1	WA Tlemcen	29 April 1999 – 9 May 1999

== Semi-finals ==
June 26, 1999	USM Alger	2–2 (a.e.t.) (5–4 p)	MC Alger	Algiers
15:00	Hamdani 21' (pen.); Yacef 113'	report	14' Saïfi; 119' Rahmouni	Stadium: Stade 5 Juillet 1962; Attendance: 90,000
	Penalties
	Zeghdoud (penalty scored); Djahnine (penalty scored); Hamdani (penalty scored); Dziri (penalty scored); Hadj Adlane (penalty scored)		(penalty missed) Meraga; (penalty scored) Fatahine; (penalty scored) Slatni; (penalty scored) Azzouz; (penalty scored) Rahmouni

June 10, 1999 first leg	JS Kabylie	3–0	NA Hussein Dey	Tizi Ouzou
15:00	Deriouche 27'; Benhamlet 39'; Ghazi 63'			Stadium: Stade 1er Novembre 1954

June 26, 1999 Second leg	NA Hussein Dey	0–1	JS Kabylie	Algiers
15:00			90' Ghazi	Stadium: Stade Omar Hamadi

== Final ==
July 1, 1999
15:00

USM Alger	2–0	JS Kabylie
Dziri 76'; Hadj Adlane 82'	report

Stade 5 Juillet 1962, Algiers
Attendance: 63.000
Referee: Benchenâa
Assistant referees: Ahcen Bouraoui, Mohamed Oudjani

== Champions ==
Algerian Cup
1998–99 Winners

USM Alger
4th Title
