= Fayçal Hamdani =

Algerian footballer (born 1970)

Personal information
- Date of birth: July 13, 1970 (age 56)
- Place of birth: Boufarik, Algeria
- Position: Defender

Senior career*
Years	Team	Apps	(Gls)
1989–1990	WA Boufarik		
1990–1993	MC Alger		
1993–1996	WA Boufarik		
1996–2002	USM Alger		
2002–2007	WA Boufarik		

International career
1991–1999	Algeria	28	(0)
- * Club domestic league appearances and goals

Fayçal Hamdani (born July 13, 1970) is an Algerian former footballer who played as a defender. He made 28 appearances for the Algeria national team.

== Honours ==
USM Alger

- Ligue 1: 2001–02
- Algerian Cup: 1997, 1999, 2001
