= Hamza Yacef =

Algerian footballer (born 1979)

Personal information
- Full name: Hamza Yacef
- Date of birth: 25 August 1979 (age 47)
- Place of birth: Sidi M'Hamed, Algiers, Algeria
- Height: 1.78 m (5 ft 10 in)
- Position: Forward

Senior career*
| Years | Team | Apps | (Gls) |
| | NA Hussein Dey | ? | (?) |
| 1997–2001 | USM Alger | ? | (11) |
| 2001–2005 | NA Hussein Dey | 73 | (26) |
| 2005–2007 | JS Kabylie | 53 | (9) |
| 2007–2008 | Wydad Casablanca | 9 | (1) |
| 2008–2009 | MC Alger | 14 | (1) |
| 2009–2010 | MSP Batna | 17 | (3) |
| 2010–2012 | CS Constantine | - | (-) |
| 2012–2014 | MO Constantine | - | (-) |

International career^{‡}
| 2005–2008 | Algeria | 9 | (1) |
- * Club domestic league appearances and goals ‡ National team caps and goals as of November 2009

Hamza Yacef (Arabic: حمزة ياسف; born 25 August 1979), is an Algerian former footballer.

== Club career ==
Yacef started his playing career with USM Alger, where he signed his first contract in 1997. He would play with the club for four seasons, winning the Algerian Cup twice in 1997 and 1999, and finishing twice as runner-up in the league in 1998 and 2001. In the summer of 2001, he signed a contract with NA Hussein Dey, who were playing in the second division. After just one season, he would help the team return to the top flight. He played three more seasons with NA Hussein Dey, scoring 26 goals in 73 appearances. In the summer of 2005, he signed with JS Kabylie.

In 2007, he signed a two-year contract with Moroccan club Wydad Casablanca worth $300,000.

== Honours ==
- Won the Algerian league once with JS Kabylie in 2006
- Won the Algerian Cup twice with USM Alger in 1997 and 1999
