= Hussein Dey (commune) =

Coordinates: 36°44′N 3°06′E

- Country: Algeria
- Province: Algiers
- Time zone: UTC+1 (West Africa Time)

Hussein Dey is a suburb of the city of Algiers in northern Algeria, named after Hussein Dey, the last of the Ottoman provincial rulers of Algiers.

== Notable people ==
- Mohamed Arkab (born 1966)
