= 2026–27 USM Alger basketball season =

Algerian basketball team season

USM Alger
2026–27 season
- President: (Algeria) Fouad Djabrouni
- Head coach: (Algeria) Maamar Berriche
- Arena: Salle OMS Abdelaziz Ben Tifour, Hydra
- Super Division: pre-season
- Algerian Cup: pre-season
- Biggest win: USM Alger 87–59 US Sétif (September 12, 2026)
- Biggest defeat: USM Alger 78–90 MC Alger (October 10, 2026)

The 2026–27 season was USM Alger's 65th in existence, their 8th consecutive season in the top flight of the Algerian basketball, USM Alger participated in the season's editions of the Algerian Cup.

== Overview ==
The 2026-27 basketball season in Algeria will begin on September 11 and 12, 2026, with the resumption of the Super Division, the Algerian Basketball Federation (FABB) announced following a coordination meeting with the clubs held in Algiers. The 14 participating teams are: WO Boufarik, NB Staouéli, CS Tlemcen, Rouiba CB, MC Alger, USM Alger, USM Blida, CR Béni Saf, CSC Djasr Kasentina, CRB Dar Beida, US Sétif, NA Hussein Dey, CM Oran and WRB El Eulma. The meeting between the FABB and club representatives addressed several issues related to the new season, with the aim of establishing a common vision and improving the organization and competitive level of the national championships. The federation also called on all stakeholders to prioritize the interests of Algerian basketball and continue their efforts to promote the professionalization and development of the sport.

On 10 October 2026, USM Alger faced city rivals MC Alger at the Coupole of the Mohamed-Boudiaf Olympic Complex in Algiers. The derby attracted approximately 3,000 spectators, with both sets of supporters creating an atmosphere comparable to that of major football derbies. The crowd began gathering more than two hours before the scheduled 4 p.m. tip-off, and chants continued throughout the game. MC Alger won the match 90–78, extending its winning run to five consecutive games and maintaining a joint lead in the Algerian Super Division standings alongside NB Staouéli. The encounter highlighted the strong support that basketball can attract in Algiers, particularly when the capital's two rival clubs meet.

== Players ==
=== Super Division roster ===
Note: Flags indicate national team eligibility at FIBA-sanctioned events. Players may hold other non-FIBA nationalities not displayed.

USM Alger roster
Players
Coaches

Pos.	No.	Nat.	Name	Ht.	Wt.	Age
SF	1	(Algeria)	Belhadj, Ramadane	1.70 m (5 ft 7 in)	65 kg (143 lb)	31 – 5 April 1995
SG	2	(Algeria)	Koroghli, Mohamed	1.82 m (6 ft 0 in)	78 kg (172 lb)	20 – 20 April 2006
SF	3	(Algeria)	Zidi, Abdeldjalil	1.85 m (6 ft 1 in)	80 kg (176 lb)	20 – 20 May 2006
PG	4	(Algeria)	Khoudja, Zakaria	1.85 m (6 ft 1 in)	75 kg (165 lb)	21 – 10 May 2005
SG	7	(Algeria)	Fodil, Ilyes	1.80 m (5 ft 11 in)	75 kg (165 lb)	21 – 4 April 2005
SG	8	(Algeria)	Boutiba, Ahmed	1.94 m (6 ft 4 in)	85 kg (187 lb)	30 – 22 December 1995
PG	10	(Algeria)	Messaoudi, Bouhaous	1.88 m (6 ft 2 in)	90 kg (198 lb)	38 – 20 September 1988
PF	11	(Algeria)	Redouane, Tarek	2.00 m (6 ft 7 in)	85 kg (187 lb)	33 – 11 April 1993
SG	15	(Algeria)	Mimouni, Redouane	1.86 m (6 ft 1 in)	80 kg (176 lb)	39 – 23 August 1987
C	19	(Algeria)	Zaim, Mehdi	2.07 m (6 ft 9 in)	98 kg (216 lb)	23 – 1 September 2003
SG	21	(Algeria)	Medjoubi, Bacim	1.88 m (6 ft 2 in)	75 kg (165 lb)	25 – 20 October 2001
PF	24	(Algeria)	Guezout, Zakaria	2.00 m (6 ft 7 in)	87 kg (192 lb)	34 – 30 July 1992
C	99	(Algeria)	Rahmouni, Abdesselem	1.75 m (5 ft 9 in)	70 kg (154 lb)	20 – 8 October 2006
PF		(Algeria)	Bougria, Moussa	1.85 m (6 ft 1 in)	86 kg (190 lb)	33 – 20 January 1993
PF		(Algeria)	Lakeb, Riadh	1.93 m (6 ft 4 in)	60 kg (132 lb)	20 – 27 March 2006
PF		(Algeria)	Chaid, Badreddine (C)	1.87 m (6 ft 2 in)	74 kg (163 lb)	23 – 17 April 2003
C		(Algeria)	Messaoudi, Faredj	2.15 m (7 ft 1 in)	105 kg (231 lb)	23 – 20 January 2003

Head coach

- (Algeria) Maamar Berriche

Assistant coach(es)

- (Algeria) Nassim Djabour

Legend

- (C) Team captain
- (I) Import player
- Injured

- Roster
Updated: September 25, 2026

=== Transactions ===
==== In ====
No.	Pos.	Nat.	Name	Age	Moving from		Type	Ends	Transfer fee	Date	Source
24	PF	(Algeria)	Zakaria Guezout	34	CSC Djasr Kasentina	(Algeria)	End of contract	June 2026	Free	Unknown	
	PF	(Algeria)	Moussa Bougria	33	CSC Djasr Kasentina	(Algeria)	End of contract	June 2026	Free	Unknown	
	PG	(Algeria)	Bouhaous Messaoudi	38	CSC Djasr Kasentina	(Algeria)	End of contract	June 2026	Free	Unknown	

==== Out ====
No.	Pos.	Nat.	Name	Age	Moving to		Type	Transfer fee	Date	Source
	PF	(Algeria)	Laamouri Merahi	31	NB Staouéli	(Algeria)	End of contract	Free	29 September 2026	

== Competitions ==
=== Overview ===
Competition	First match	Last match	Starting round	Final position	Record							
Competition	First match	Last match	Starting round	Final position	Pld	W	D	L	PF	PA	PD	Win %
Super Division	12 September 2026	To be confirmed	Round 1	In Progress	4	2	0	2	282	238	+44	50.00
Algerian Cup	To be confirmed	To be confirmed	In Progress	In Progress	0	0	0	0	0	0	+0	—
Total					4	2	0	2	282	238	+44	50.00

Last updated: October 1, 2026
Source: Competitions

=== Super Division ===
==== League table ====
Pos	Team	Pld	W	L	GF	GA	GD	Pts	
3	MC Alger	2	2	0	128	104	+24	4	Advance to play-off
4	NA Hussein Dey	2	2	0	87	64	+23	4	Advance to play-off
5	USM Alger	2	1	1	144	118	+26	3	Advance to play-off
6	Rouiba CB	2	1	1	171	161	+10	3	Advance to play-off
7	CS Tlemcen	2	1	1	119	111	+8	3	Advance to Play-in

First match(es) will be played: September 22, 2026. Source: FABB

==== Results summary ====
Overall						Home					Away				
Pld	W	L	PF	PA	PD	W	L	PF	PA	PD	W	L	PF	PA	PD
4	2	2	282	238	+44	2	0	162	113	+49	0	2	120	125	−5

Last updated: October 1, 2026.
Source: Competitive matches

==== Results by round ====
Round	1	2	3	4	5	6	7	8	9	10	11	12	13	14	15	16	17	18	19	20	21	22	23	24	25	26
Ground	H	A	H	A	H	H	A	H	A	H	A	H	A													
Result	W	L	W	L	L	W			W	L	W															
Position	1	5	3	6	7	6																				

Source: Competitive matches
A = Away; H = Home; W = Win; L = Loss; R = Rest

==== Matches ====
All times are local, WAT (UTC+1).

September 12, 2026 1	USM Alger	87–59	US Sétif	Hydra
16:00	Scoring by quarter: 26–13, 22–13, 16–19, 23–14
	Pts: Mimouni 19; Rebs: Redouane, Zaim 7 Asts: Khodja 5	Boxscore	Pts: Ouail Sofiane Gadaoui 17; Rebs: Anis Azzouz 12; Asts: Ouail Sofiane Gadaoui 5	Arena: Salle OMS Abdelaziz Ben Tifour; Attendance: 200; Referees: Si Youcef Sofiane, Harrache Mouad, Heddi Smail

September 18, 2026 2	USM Blida	59–57	USM Alger	Blida
16:00	Scoring by quarter: 15–17, 16–13, 21–14, 7–13
	Pts: Mohamed Zahaf 17; Rebs: Abdesselem Dekkiche 8 Asts: Mousaab Kaoub 4	Boxscore	Pts: Guezout 19; Rebs: Khodja, Zaim 7 Asts: Guezout 5	Arena: Salle Hocine Chalane; Attendance: 200; Referees: Si Youcef Sofiane, Berrah Mhamed, Harrache Mouad

September 26, 2026 3	USM Alger	75–54	CM Oran	Hydra
16:00	Scoring by quarter: 21–7, 16–18, 22–11, 16–18
	Pts: Guezout 26; Rebs: Zaim 13; Asts: B.Messaoudi 5	Boxscore	Pts: Oussama Hamito 16; Rebs: Mouhamed El Amine Medmoun 12; Asts: Abdeldjalil Filali, Mohamed Bab El Ayat 2	Arena: Salle OMS Abdelaziz Ben Tifour; Attendance: 100; Referees: Laroussi Adlen, Berrah Mhamed, Rahali Amir

October 1, 2026 4	WO Boufarik	66–63	USM Alger	Boufarik
18:00	Scoring by quarter: 15–15, 19–16, 19–16, 13–16
	Pts: Mohamed Sahraoui 16; Rebs: Zakaria Foughali 9 Asts: Adel Bachouche 3	Boxscore	Pts: Guezout 19; Rebs: Guezout 9 Asts: B.Messaoudi, Guezout 2	Arena: Salle Moussa Cheraf; Attendance: 300; Referees: Bennani Anis, Latibi Wahid, Harrache Mouad

October 10, 2026 5	USM Alger	78–90	MC Alger	Dély Ibrahim, Algiers
16:00	Scoring by quarter: 24–29, 18–17, 16–19, 20–25
Sport Plus HD	Pts: Guezout 29; Rebs: Zaim 16; Asts: Belhadj 5	Boxscore	Pts: Ramzi Merahi 22; Rebs: Mustapha Adrar 8 Asts: Ramzi Merahi 7	Arena: La Coupole d'Alger Arena; Attendance: 3000; Referees: Larouci Adlen, Kahallou Adel, Latibi Wahid

October 31, 2026 9	CSC Djasr Kasentina	50–53	USM Alger	Douéra
15:00	Scoring by quarter: 8–15, 10–17, 10–8, 22–13
	Pts: Lotfi Adrar 13; Rebs: Abderrahim Benlakehal 6 Asts: Lotfi Adrar 4	Boxscore	Pts: Tarek Redouane 15; Rebs: Omar Fateh Bensalah 12; Asts: Omar Fateh Bensalah 5	Arena: Salle omnisport de Douéra; Attendance: 100; Referees: Larouci Adlen, Fouchane Abderrezak, Ferrani Redouane

November 3, 2026 6	USM Alger	68–67	Rouiba CB	Staouéli
16:00	Scoring by quarter: 20–13, 12–24, 10–18, 26–12
	Pts: Ahmed Boutiba 25; Rebs: Omar Fateh Bensalah 11; Asts: Bouhaous Messaoudi 6	Boxscore	Pts: Sid Ali Benzaim 23; Rebs: Sid Ali Benzaim 15; Asts: Ryad Lefkir 5	Arena: Salle OMS de Staouéli; Attendance: 20; Referees: Kahallou Adel, Fouchane Abderrezak, Harrache Mouad

November 7, 2026 10	USM Alger	74–77	CS Tlemcen	Algiers
16:30	Scoring by quarter: 21–15, 17–24, 23–20, 13–18
	Pts: Ahmed Boutiba 21; Rebs: Omar Fateh Bensalah 9 Asts: Zakaria Guezout 4	Boxscore	Pts: Mostefa Braik 25; Rebs: Abakar Outman Oumar 9 Asts: Mostefa Braik 12	Arena: Salle Mohamed Handjer; Attendance: 0 (close doors); Referees: Tahmi Imène, Fouchane Abderrezak, Amrane Farid

November 13, 2026 11	WRB El Eulma	61–85	USM Alger	El Eulma
16:00	Scoring by quarter: 24–18, 8–24, 15–19, 14–24
	Pts: Akram Hamzaoui 18; Rebs: Abdelhalim Hendel 10; Asts: Amine Rouabha 4	Boxscore	Pts: Ahmed Boutiba 26; Rebs: Bouhaous Messaoudi 11; Asts: Zakaria Guezout 7	Arena: Salle Mohamed Sayeh Kechkouchi; Attendance: 100; Referees: Larouci Adlen, Bennani Anis, Amrouni Mouna

7	NA Hussein Dey	vs.	USM Alger
:	Scoring by quarter: –, –, –, –
		[ Boxscore]

8	USM Alger	vs.	NB Staouéli	Hydra
:	Scoring by quarter: –, –, –, –
		[ Boxscore]		Arena: Salle OMS Abdelaziz Ben Tifour

12	USM Alger	vs.	CRB Dar Beida
:	Scoring by quarter: –, –, –, –
		[ Boxscore]

13	CR Beni Saf	vs.	USM Alger
:	Scoring by quarter: –, –, –, –
		[ Boxscore]

14	vs.
:	Scoring by quarter: –, –, –, –
	[ Boxscore]

15	vs.
:	Scoring by quarter: –, –, –, –
	[ Boxscore]

16	vs.
:	Scoring by quarter: –, –, –, –
	[ Boxscore]

17	vs.
:	Scoring by quarter: –, –, –, –
	[ Boxscore]

18	vs.
:	Scoring by quarter: –, –, –, –
	[ Boxscore]

19	vs.
:	Scoring by quarter: –, –, –, –
	[ Boxscore]

20	vs.
:	Scoring by quarter: –, –, –, –
	[ Boxscore]

21	vs.
:	Scoring by quarter: –, –, –, –
	[ Boxscore]

22	vs.
:	Scoring by quarter: –, –, –, –
	[ Boxscore]

23	vs.
:	Scoring by quarter: –, –, –, –
	[ Boxscore]

24	vs.
:	Scoring by quarter: –, –, –, –
	[ Boxscore]

25	vs.
:	Scoring by quarter: –, –, –, –
	[ Boxscore]

26	vs.
:	Scoring by quarter: –, –, –, –
	[ Boxscore]

== Statistics ==
=== Super Division ===
As of 14 August 2026

Legend
GP	Games played	GS	Games started	MPG	Minutes per game
FG%	Field-goal percentage	3P%	3-point field-goal percentage	FT%	Free-throw percentage
RPG	Rebounds per game	APG	Assists per game	SPG	Steals per game
BPG	Blocks per game	PPG	Points per game

Player	GP	GS	MPG	2FG%	3FG%	FT%	RPG	APG	BPG	SPG	PPG
Zakariya Khodja	0	0	00:00	0 %	0 %	0 %	0.0	0.0	0.0	0.0	0.0
Bacim Medjoubi	0	0	00:00	0 %	0 %	0 %	0.0	0.0	0.0	0.0	0.0
Ahmed Boutiba	0	0	00:00	0 %	0 %	0 %	0.0	0.0	0.0	0.0	0.0
Ramdane Belhadj	0	0	00:00	0 %	0 %	0 %	0.0	0.0	0.0	0.0	0.0
Tarek Redouane	0	0	00:00	0 %	0 %	0 %	0.0	0.0	0.0	0.0	0.0
Ilyes Fodil	0	0	00:00	0 %	0 %	0 %	0.0	0.0	0.0	0.0	0.0
Faredj Messaoudi	0	0	00:00	0 %	0 %	0 %	0.0	0.0	0.0	0.0	0.0
Mehdi Zaim	0	0	00:00	0 %	0 %	0 %	0.0	0.0	0.0	0.0	0.0
Redouane Mimouni	0	0	00:00	0 %	0 %	0 %	0.0	0.0	0.0	0.0	0.0
Riadh Lakeb	0	0	00:00	0 %	0 %	0 %	0.0	0.0	0.0	0.0	0.0
Badreddine Chaid	0	0	00:00	0 %	0 %	0 %	0.0	0.0	0.0	0.0	0.0
TOTAL				0 %	0 %	0} %	0	0	0	0	0

Source: afrobasket

=== Algerian Cup ===
As of 17 August 2026

Player	GP	GS	MPG	2FG%	3FG%	FT%	RPG	APG	BPG	SPG	PPG
Zakariya Khodja	0	0	00:00	0 %	0 %	0 %	0.0	0.0	0.0	0.0	0.0
Bacim Medjoubi	0	0	00:00	0 %	0 %	0 %	0.0	0.0	0.0	0.0	0.0
Ahmed Boutiba	0	0	00:00	0 %	0 %	0 %	0.0	0.0	0.0	0.0	0.0
Ramdane Belhadj	0	0	00:00	0 %	0 %	0 %	0.0	0.0	0.0	0.0	0.0
Tarek Redouane	0	0	00:00	0 %	0 %	0 %	0.0	0.0	0.0	0.0	0.0
Ilyes Fodil	0	0	00:00	0 %	0 %	0 %	0.0	0.0	0.0	0.0	0.0
Faredj Messaoudi	0	0	00:00	0 %	0 %	0 %	0.0	0.0	0.0	0.0	0.0
Mehdi Zaim	0	0	00:00	0 %	0 %	0 %	0.0	0.0	0.0	0.0	0.0
Redouane Mimouni	0	0	00:00	0 %	0 %	0 %	0.0	0.0	0.0	0.0	0.0
Riadh Lakeb	0	0	00:00	0 %	0 %	0 %	0.0	0.0	0.0	0.0	0.0
Badreddine Chaid	0	0	00:00	0 %	0 %	0 %	0.0	0.0	0.0	0.0	0.0
TOTAL				0 %	0 %	0 %	0	0	0	0	0

Source: afrobasket

== USM Alger Women ==
USM Alger
2026–27 season
- President: (Algeria) Fouad Djabrouni
- Head coach: (Algeria)
- Arena: Salle OMS Abdelaziz Ben Tifour, Hydra
- National 1: pre-season
- Algerian Cup: pre-season
- Biggest win: USM Alger 69–48 NB Staouéli (October 16, 2026)

== Overview ==
The 2026–27 Algerian Women's Basketball National 1 Championship is scheduled to begin on 25 September 2026, according to the calendar announced by the Algerian Basketball Federation (FABB) following a coordination meeting with club representatives held in Algiers. The 14 participating teams are: NB Staouéli, Rouiba CB, MC Alger, FS Setifienne, RC Bordj Bou Arreridj, USA Batna, Hussein Dey Marines, SB Bejaia, NO Réghaïa, EEI Annaba, MT Sétif, JF Kouba, GS Cosider and USM Alger. The competition is the highest level of women's basketball league competition in Algeria. During the meeting, participants discussed several issues relating to the organisation of the new season and exchanged views on preparations for the start of the competitions.

USM Alger produced the standout performance of the second round of the National 1 by defeating defending champions Hussein-Dey Marine 59–58 in Hydra. Following their opening-day victory over FS Setifienne, USMA secured a second consecutive win to maintain their perfect start to the season. With 118 points scored and 99 conceded, the Algiers-based side sits fourth in the standings, with a points difference of +19. This narrow victory over the defending champions further highlights USMA's promising start to the campaign. On October 23, 2026, USM Alger continued their positive run with a convincing 71–40 away victory over SB Bejaia. Building on their previous win against Hussein-Dey Marines, the Usmistes once again demonstrated their offensive efficiency and defensive solidity. Having already defeated the defending champions, USMA confirmed their ambitions to play a competitive role in this season’s championship. Meanwhile, SB Bejaia struggled to keep pace and will need greater consistency to improve their position in the standings.

== Women Players ==
=== National 1 roster ===
Note: Flags indicate national team eligibility at FIBA-sanctioned events. Players may hold other non-FIBA nationalities not displayed.

USM Alger roster
Players
Coaches

Pos.	No.	Nat.	Name	Ht.	Wt.	Age
PG	2	(Algeria)	Yahou, Hadjer	1.65 m (5 ft 5 in)		21 – 25 June 2005
SG	3	(Algeria)	Nadhri, Sabrina
G	4	(Algeria)	Fantazi, Radia			34 – 10 August 1992
PF	7	(Algeria)	Benani, Souad
SG	8	(Algeria)	Gharsalah, Yasmin
PG	9	(Algeria)	Adjab, Nawal
PF	11	(Algeria)	Allik, Simine
	13	(Algeria)	Reguig, Neyla (C)	1.85 m (6 ft 1 in)		29 – 11 February 1997
PF	17	(Algeria)	Chikirou, Hanane
G	20	(Algeria)	Ahmin, Meriam	1.80 m (5 ft 11 in)		21 – 20 June 2005
G/F	25	(Algeria)	Meskine, Maria Cerine	1.75 m (5 ft 9 in)		19 – 25 February 2007
	66	(Algeria)	Kardi, Raja Cyrine

Head coach

- (Algeria)

Legend

- (C) Team captain
- (I) Import player
- Injured

- Roster
Updated: May 15, 2026

== Competitions ==
=== Overview ===
Competition	First match	Last match	Starting round	Final position	Record							
Competition	First match	Last match	Starting round	Final position	Pld	W	D	L	PF	PA	PD	Win %
National 1	25 September 2026	To be confirmed	Round 1	In Progress	5	4	0	1	323	256	+67	80.00
Algerian Cup	To be confirmed	To be confirmed	In Progress	In Progress	0	0	0	0	0	0	+0	—
Total					5	4	0	1	323	256	+67	80.00

Last updated: October 23, 2026
Source: Competitions

=== National 1 ===
==== League table ====
Pos	Team	Pld	W	L	GF	GA	GD	Pts	
2	JF Kouba	4	4	0	173	204	−31	8	Advance to play-off
3	MC Alger	4	3	1	264	177	+87	7	Advance to play-off
4	USM Alger	4	3	1	252	216	+36	7	Advance to play-off
5	RC Bordj Bou Arreridj	4	3	1	213	214	−1	7	Advance to play-off
6	MT Sétif	4	2	2	191	205	−14	6	Advance to play-off

First match(es) will be played: October 16, 2026. Source: FABB

==== Results summary ====
Overall						Home					Away				
Pld	W	L	PF	PA	PD	W	L	PF	PA	PD	W	L	PF	PA	PD
4	3	1	252	216	+36	2	0	128	106	+22	1	1	124	110	+14

Last updated: October 16, 2026.
Source: Competitive matches

==== Results by round ====
Round	1	2	3	4	5	6	7	8	9	10	11	12	13	14	15	16	17	18	19	20	21	22	23	24	25	26
Ground	A	H	A	H	A	H	A																			
Result	W	W	L	W	W	W	W																			
Position	6	4	4	4	4	3	3																			

Source: Competitive matches
A = Away; H = Home; W = Win; L = Loss; R = Rest

==== Women Matches ====
All times are local, WAT (UTC+1).

September 25, 2026 1	FS Setifienne	41–59	USM Alger	Aïn Arnat
15:00	Scoring by quarter: 14–11, 12–17, 3–11, 12–20
		Boxscore		Arena: Salle OMS d'Aïn Arnat

October 3, 2026 2	USM Alger	59–58	Hussein Dey Marines	Hydra
15:00	Scoring by quarter: 13–17, 15–13, 15–15, 16–13
Sport Plus HD		Boxscore		Arena: Salle OMS Abdelaziz Ben Tifour; Referees: Marouf, Kahil

October 9, 2026 3	JF Kouba	69–65	USM Alger	Birtouta
16:00	Scoring by quarter: –, –, –, –
		Boxscore		Arena: Salle OMS Birtouta

October 16, 2026 4	USM Alger	69–48	NB Staouéli	Hydra
17:00	Scoring by quarter: 26–8, 19–4, 11–18, 13–18
		Boxscore		Arena: Salle OMS Abdelaziz Ben Tifour

October 23, 2026 5	SB Bejaia	40–71	USM Alger	Bejaia
15:00	Scoring by quarter: –, –, –, –
		Boxscore		Referees: Lekdim, Mahboub

October 30, 2026 6	USM Alger	66–36	NO Réghaïa	Hydra
16:30	Scoring by quarter: 17–10, 16–11, 19–4, 14–11
		Boxscore		Arena: Salle OMS Abdelaziz Ben Tifour

November 6, 2026 7	EEI Annaba	32–72	USM Alger	Annaba
15:00	Scoring by quarter: –, –, –, –
		[ Boxscore]		Referees: Boubred, Boughdiri

8	RC Bordj Bou Arreridj	vs.	USM Alger
:	Scoring by quarter: –, –, –, –
		[ Boxscore]

9	USM Alger	vs.	MT Sétif
:	Scoring by quarter: –, –, –, –
		[ Boxscore]

10	USA Batna	vs.	USM Alger
:	Scoring by quarter: –, –, –, –
		[ Boxscore]

11	USM Alger	vs.	GS Cosider
:	Scoring by quarter: –, –, –, –
		[ Boxscore]

12	Rouiba CB	vs.	USM Alger
:	Scoring by quarter: –, –, –, –
		[ Boxscore]

13	USM Alger	vs.	MC Alger
:	Scoring by quarter: –, –, –, –
		[ Boxscore]

14	vs.
:	Scoring by quarter: –, –, –, –
	[ Boxscore]

15	vs.
:	Scoring by quarter: –, –, –, –
	[ Boxscore]

16	vs.
:	Scoring by quarter: –, –, –, –
	[ Boxscore]

17	vs.
:	Scoring by quarter: –, –, –, –
	[ Boxscore]

18	vs.
:	Scoring by quarter: –, –, –, –
	[ Boxscore]

19	vs.
:	Scoring by quarter: –, –, –, –
	[ Boxscore]

20	vs.
:	Scoring by quarter: –, –, –, –
	[ Boxscore]

21	vs.
:	Scoring by quarter: –, –, –, –
	[ Boxscore]

22	vs.
:	Scoring by quarter: –, –, –, –
	[ Boxscore]

23	vs.
:	Scoring by quarter: –, –, –, –
	[ Boxscore]

24	vs.
:	Scoring by quarter: –, –, –, –
	[ Boxscore]

25	vs.
:	Scoring by quarter: –, –, –, –
	[ Boxscore]

26	vs.
:	Scoring by quarter: –, –, –, –
	[ Boxscore]
