= 2025 Algerian Basketball Super Division finals =

2025 Algerian Basketball Super Division Finals
- Match programme cover
| Team | Coach | Wins |
|---|---|---|
| NB Staouéli | Mohamed Yahya | 2 |
| NA Hussein Dey | Djamel Rekik | 0 |
- Dates: June 13– 14
- Semifinalists: NB Staouéli defeated MC Alger 2–0. NA Hussein Dey defeated WO Boufarik 1–1.

2025 Algerian Basketball Super Division Finals is a final between the two top Algerian basketball teams. While the semi-finals of the "AS" tournament of the Super Division are scheduled for May 27 and 28, the final has already been set for June 13 and 14, 2025, in Algiers. The Coupole of the Mohamed Boudiaf Olympic Complex, which hosted the playoffs and is hosting the semi-finals, is also expected to host the final.

The final stage of the 2024–25 Super Division took place at the Mohamed Boudiaf Olympic Complex in Algiers. It featured the top four teams from the playoffs held in late May 2025: WO Boufarik (defending champions), NB Staouéli, MC Alger, and NA Hussein Dey. In the semi-finals, NB Staouéli qualified for the final by defeating MC Alger in two consecutive games (84–73, 77–71). Meanwhile, NA Hussein Dey caused an upset by eliminating WO Boufarik in a tightly contested series (62–69, 98–90).

NB Staouéli has been crowned Algerian Super Division Champion for the 2024–25 season. In the final, faced NA Hussein Dey and secured victory in both legs winning 69–67 in the first leg and 70–59 in the second leg. With this double triumph, NB Staouéli clinched the third national championship title in its history, following earlier successes in 2007 and in 2022. Guided by former international player Mohamed Yahia, the club succeeds WO Boufarik, who won the title in the 2023–24 season. NA Hussein Dey, narrowly missed out on what would have been the first national title in the club’s history.

== Overviews ==
=== NB Staouéli roster ===
Note: Flags indicate national team eligibility at FIBA-sanctioned events. Players may hold other non-FIBA nationalities not displayed.

NB Staouéli roster
Players
Coaches

| Pos. | No. | Nat. | Name | Ht. | Age |
|---|---|---|---|---|---|
| PG | 4 | (Algeria) | Fedala, Anis Mohamed | | 36 – 8 January 1990 |
| G | 5 | (Algeria) | Slimani, Hamoud |
| G/F | 6 | (Algeria) | Sedoud, Chakib | 2.03 m (6 ft 8 in) | 21 – 15 October 2004 |
| G/F | 7 | (Algeria) | Bensalah, Amine | 2.02 m (6 ft 8 in) |
| CG | 8 | (Algeria) | Yahya, Merouane | 1.85 m (6 ft 1 in) | 23 – 19 March 2003 |
| SG | 9 | (Algeria) | Ghrib, Sid Ali (C) | | 41 – 1 June 1985 |
| G | 10 | (Algeria) | Benrighi, Abderaouf | | 29 – 27 November 1996 |
| C | 11 | (Algeria) | Matoub, Zakaria | 2.06 m (6 ft 9 in) | 28 – 24 October 1997 |
| F | 12 | (Algeria) | Aious, Sami | 1.99 m (6 ft 6 in) | 20 – 12 October 2005 |
| G | 13 | (Algeria) | Oahab, Khaled | | 37 – 27 July 1988 |
| PG | 14 | (Algeria) | Boussad, Mohamed | 1.80 m (5 ft 11 in) | 27 – 26 November 1998 |
| PF | 15 | (Algeria) | Dekakene, Hichem | 1.90 m (6 ft 3 in) | 28 – 11 June 1997 |

Head coach

- (Algeria) Mohamed Yahya

Assistant coach(es)

- (Algeria)

Legend

- (C) Team captain
- (I) Import player
- Injured

=== NA Hussein Dey roster ===
Note: Flags indicate national team eligibility at FIBA-sanctioned events. Players may hold other non-FIBA nationalities not displayed.

NA Hussein Dey roster
Players
Coaches

| Pos. | No. | Nat. | Name | Ht. | Age |
|---|---|---|---|---|---|
| PF | 4 | (Algeria) | Semrouni, Abdesselem | 1.96 m (6 ft 5 in) |
| G | 5 | (Algeria) | Bellakhdar, Ramzi Fouad | 1.84 m (6 ft 0 in) | 20 – 25 February 2006 |
| SF | 6 | (Algeria) | Benbrahim, Sif Eddine | 1.84 m (6 ft 0 in) |
| PG | 7 | (Algeria) | Djellili, Mounir |
| PG | 8 | (Algeria) | Guemmat, Mohamed Zaki | 1.80 m (5 ft 11 in) | 32 – 7 September 1993 |
| G/F | 9 | (Algeria) | Boudoumi, Youcef | 1.92 m (6 ft 4 in) | 28 – 3 March 1998 |
| C | 10 | (Algeria) | Belliche, Omar (C) | 2.06 m (6 ft 9 in) | 34 – 16 February 1992 |
| F | 11 | (Algeria) | Belakhdar, Farouk |
| G | 12 | (Algeria) | Hasnaoui, Mohamed |
| F | 13 | (Algeria) | Bellakhdar, Abderraouf |
| PG | 14 | (Algeria) | Ziane, Abdelkrim | 1.86 m (6 ft 1 in) |
| G/F | 15 | (Algeria) | Hamdi, Rayan | 2.04 m (6 ft 8 in) | 26 – 9 July 1999 |

Head coach

- (Algeria) Djamel Rekik

Assistant coach(es)

- (Algeria) Boussaad Cherbal

Legend

- (C) Team captain
- (I) Import player
- Injured

== Regular season series ==
The regular season series ended 2–0 in favor of NB Staouéli.

January 10, 2025

Boxscore

NB Staouéli 73, NA Hussein Dey 71
Scoring by quarter: 19–18, 14–20, 23–20, 17–13

Salle OMS de Staouéli

April 12, 2025

[ Boxscore]

NA Hussein Dey 58, NB Staouéli 80
Scoring by quarter: –, –, –, –

Salle Mohamed Handjer

== Playoff ==
At the end of the 1st phase, the teams ranked from 1st to 8th place will be divided into two groups A and B, each composed of four teams according to the serpentine system. Each group (A and B) will play a 3-day tournament on a neutral ground that will be designated by the FABB. At the end of these two tournaments, the teams ranked 1 and 2 of each group A and B will play an Aces tournament with direct elimination as follows:

- 1st of group A play against 2nd of group B
- 1st of group B play against 2nd of group A

Playoffs Group A table
| Pos | Team | Pld | W | L | GF | GA | GD | Pts | |
|---|---|---|---|---|---|---|---|---|---|
| 1 | NB Staouéli | 3 | 3 | 0 | 243 | 176 | +67 | 6 | Qualification to the Semi-finals |
| 2 | NA Hussein Dey | 3 | 2 | 1 | 232 | 230 | +2 | 5 | Qualification to the Semi-finals |
| 3 | USM Blida | 3 | 1 | 2 | 200 | 263 | −63 | 4 | |
| 4 | CR Beni Saf | 3 | 0 | 3 | 245 | 251 | −6 | 3 | |

First match(es) will be played: May 22, 2025. Source: FABB

| May 18, 2025 Round 1 | NB Staouéli | 78–75 | USM Blida | La Coupole d'Alger Arena, Dély Ibrahim, Algiers |
| 19:00 | Scoring by quarter: 12–15, 27–17, 23–22, 16–21 |
| | Pts: Chakib Sedoud 20; Rebs: Khaled Oahab 8 Asts: Mohamed Anis Fedala 6 | Boxscore | Pts: Mohamed Zahaf 22; Rebs: Azzeddine Boulesnane 9 Asts: Moussaab Koob 6 | Referees: Sofiane Si Youcef, Hamid Kaddour, Sofiane Hammada |

| May 20, 2025 Round 2 | NB Staouéli | 73–56 | NA Hussein Dey | La Coupole d'Alger Arena, Dély Ibrahim, Algiers |
| 19:00 | Scoring by quarter: 20–19, 10–15, 27–9, 16–13 |
| | Pts: Mohammed Amine Bensalah 21; Rebs: Abderaouf Berrighi 15; Asts: Dekakene, Yahya 5 | Boxscore | Pts: Mohamed Amine Hasnaoui 13; Rebs: Sif Eddine Benbrahim 7 Asts: Ziane, Guemmat 4 | Referees: Sofiane Si Youcef, M'hamed Berrah, Adlen Larouci |

| May 22, 2025 Round 3 | CR Beni Saf | 45–92 | NB Staouéli | La Coupole d'Alger Arena, Dély Ibrahim, Algiers |
| 19:00 | Scoring by quarter: 11–28, 19–17, 12–20, 3–27 |
| | Pts: Djamel Mezrai 17; Rebs: Mohamed Douifi 11; Asts: Houcem Moussa Benyacine 5 | Boxscore | Pts: Hichem Dekakene 15; Rebs: Abderaouf Berrighi 8 Asts: Mohamed Boussad 6 | Referees: Anis Bennani, M'hamed Berrah, Yacine Kahil |

Playoffs Group A table
| Pos | Team | Pld | W | L | GF | GA | GD | Pts | |
|---|---|---|---|---|---|---|---|---|---|
| 1 | NB Staouéli | 3 | 3 | 0 | 243 | 176 | +67 | 6 | Qualification to the Semi-finals |
| 2 | NA Hussein Dey | 3 | 2 | 1 | 232 | 230 | +2 | 5 | Qualification to the Semi-finals |
| 3 | USM Blida | 3 | 1 | 2 | 200 | 263 | −63 | 4 | |
| 4 | CR Beni Saf | 3 | 0 | 3 | 245 | 251 | −6 | 3 | |

First match(es) will be played: May 22, 2025. Source: FABB

| May 18, 2025 Round 1 | NA Hussein Dey | 84–74 | CR Beni Saf | La Coupole d'Alger Arena, Dély Ibrahim, Algiers |
| 16:30 | Scoring by quarter: 29–20, 23–11, 12–21, 20–22 |
| | Pts: Rayan Hamdi 23; Rebs: Mohamed Amine Hasnaoui 17; Asts: Mohamed Zaki Guemmat 13 | Boxscore | Pts: Three players 12; Rebs: Mohamed Azzi 9 Asts: Aissam Benarbia 9 | Referees: Adlen Larouci, M'hamed Berrah, Sid Ali Osmane |

| May 20, 2025 Round 2 | NB Staouéli | 73–56 | NA Hussein Dey | La Coupole d'Alger Arena, Dély Ibrahim, Algiers |
| 19:00 | Scoring by quarter: 20–19, 10–15, 27–9, 16–13 |
| | Pts: Mohammed Amine Bensalah 21; Rebs: Abderaouf Berrighi 15; Asts: Dekakene, Yahya 5 | Boxscore | Pts: Mohamed Amine Hasnaoui 13; Rebs: Sif Eddine Benbrahim 7 Asts: Ziane, Guemmat 4 | Referees: Sofiane Si Youcef, M'hamed Berrah, Adlen Larouci |

| May 22, 2025 Round 3 | NA Hussein Dey | 92–83 | USM Blida | La Coupole d'Alger Arena, Dély Ibrahim, Algiers |
| 16:30 | Scoring by quarter: 20–18, 23–21, 21–19, 28–25 |
| | Pts: Rayan Hamdi 27; Rebs: Mohamed Amine Hasnaoui 16; Asts: Mohamed Zaki Guemmat 11 | Boxscore | Pts: Moussaab Koob 23; Rebs: Moussaab Koob 7 Asts: Mohamed Boudoumi 5 | Referees: Sofiane Si Youcef, Sofiane Hammada, Adlen Larouci |

=== Semi-finals ===
| May 27, 2025 1st leg | NB Staouéli | 84–73 | MC Alger | La Coupole d'Alger Arena, Dély Ibrahim, Algiers |
| 16:00 | Scoring by quarter: 31–21, 15–15, 20–21, 18–16 |
| | Pts: Chakib Sedoud 26; Rebs: Chakib Sedoud 13; Asts: Mohamed Anis Fedala 9 | Boxscore | Pts: Touhami Ghezzoul 24; Rebs: Touhami Ghezzoul 15; Asts: Merouane Bourkaib 9 | Referees: Sofiane Si Youcef, Adlen Larouci, Anis Bennani |

| May 28, 2025 2nd leg | MC Alger | 71–77 | NB Staouéli | La Coupole d'Alger Arena, Dély Ibrahim, Algiers |
| 16:00 | Scoring by quarter: 18–21, 10–17, 24–16, 19–23 |
| | Pts: Ramzi Merahi 24; Rebs: Youcef Khalfallah 11; Asts: Ramzi Merahi 7 | Boxscore | Pts: Mohammed Amine Bensalah 20; Rebs: Mohammed Amine Bensalah 10; Asts: Three players 2 | Referees: Adlen Larouci, Anis Bennani, M'hamed Berrah |

| May 27, 2025 1st leg | WO Boufarik | 69–62 | NA Hussein Dey | La Coupole d'Alger Arena, Dély Ibrahim, Algiers |
| 19:00 | Scoring by quarter: 27–21, 16–15, 14–9, 12–17 |
| | Pts: Louai Chebel 14; Rebs: Mohamed Seddik Touati 11; Asts: Abdelhak Henna 8 | Boxscore | Pts: Sif Eddine Benbrahim 14; Rebs: Semrouni, Hamdi 10; Asts: Guemmat , Hamdi 3 | Referees: Hamid Kaddour, Sofiane Hammada, M'hamed Berrah |

| May 28, 2025 2nd leg | NA Hussein Dey | 98–90 | WO Boufarik | La Coupole d'Alger Arena, Dély Ibrahim, Algiers |
| 19:00 | Scoring by quarter: 23–22, 27–27, 17–16, 31–25 |
| | Pts: Mohamed Zaki Guemmat 26; Rebs: Hasnaoui, Semrouni 7 Asts: Mounir DJelali 5 | Boxscore | Pts: Mohamed Akram Sahraoui 24; Rebs: Mohamed Seddik Touati 15; Asts: Tarek Hamdani 7 | Referees: Sofiane Si Youcef, Hamid Kaddour, Sofiane Hammada |

== Game summaries ==
At the end of these games, the winning teams will play two (2) Final matches, during which the Champion of Algeria for the 2024–25 sports season will be determined according to the FIBA system: If the score is tied at the end of the first game, no overtime will be played. (Article D.6.2 and Official FIBA Regulations). If the total score of the two games is tied at the end of the second game, the second game will continue with as many 5-minute overtimes as necessary to determine a winner. (Article D.6.3 and Official FIBA Regulations).

=== First leg ===
Fri, June 13
17:00

Boxscore

| NB Staouéli | 69–67 | NA Hussein Dey |
Scoring by quarter: 19–23, 15–6, 21–25, 14–13
| Pts: Bensalah 24; Rebs: Bensalah 12; Asts: Yahya, Fedala 6 | | Pts: Hamdi 16; Rebs: Hamdi 14; Asts: Guermat 7 |
NB Staouéli leads series, 1–0

La Coupole d'Alger Arena, Dély Ibrahim, Algiers
Referees: Hamid Kaddour, Sofiane Hammada, M'hamed Berrah

| Starters: | | | Pts | Reb | Ast |
|---|---|---|---|---|---|
| G/F | 6 | (Algeria) Chakib Sedoud | 17 | 8 | 2 |
| PF | 7 | (Algeria) Mohamed Amine Bensalah | 24 | 12 | 2 |
| PF | 8 | (Algeria) Merouane Yahya | 10 | 0 | 6 |
| G | 13 | (Algeria) Khaled Ouahab | 2 | 1 | 0 |
| PG | 14 | (Algeria) Mohamed Boussad | 5 | 4 | 2 |
| Reserves: | | | | | |
| PG | 4 | (Algeria) Anis Mohamed Fedala | 3 | 4 | 6 |
| G | 5 | (Algeria) Hamoud Slimani | 0 | 0 | 0 |
| SG | 9 | (Algeria) Sid Ali Ghrib | DNP | | |
| G | 10 | (Algeria) Abderraouf Benrighi | 4 | 4 | 2 |
| C | 11 | (Algeria) Zakaria Maatoub | 4 | 6 | 0 |
| G/F | 12 | (Algeria) Sami Izedine Aious | DNP | | |
| PF | 15 | (Algeria) Hichem Dekakene | DNP | | |
Head coach:
(Algerian Basketball Federation) Mohamed Yahya

| NB Staouéli | NA Hussein Dey |

| NB Staouéli | Statistics | NA Hussein Dey |
|---|---|---|
| 24/44 (54%) | 2-pt field goals | 21/50 (42%) |
| 5/18 (27%) | 3-pt field goals | 6/26 (23%) |
| 6/12 (50%) | Free throws | 7/12 (58%) |
| 9 | Offensive rebounds | 17 |
| 34 | Defensive rebounds | 28 |
| 43 | Total rebounds | 45 |
| 20 | Assists | 17 |
| 17 | Turnovers | 13 |
| 7 | Steals | 12 |
| 7 | Blocks | 2 |
| 14 (18) | Fouls | 19 (14) |

| Starters: | | | Pts | Reb | Ast |
|---|---|---|---|---|---|
| SF | 6 | (Algeria) Sif Eddine Benbrahim | 7 | 1 | 1 |
| PG | 8 | (Algeria) Mohamed Zaki Guermat | 9 | 3 | 7 |
| G | 12 | (Algeria) Mohamed Amin Hasnaoui | 4 | 5 | 1 |
| PG | 14 | (Algeria) Abdelkrim Ziane | 10 | 6 | 2 |
| G/F | 15 | (Algeria) Rayan Hamdi | 16 | 14 | 1 |
| Reserves: | | | | | |
| PF | 4 | (Algeria) Abdeslam Semrouni | 4 | 3 | 1 |
| G | 5 | (Algeria) Ramzi Fouad Bellakhdar | DNP | | |
| PG | 7 | (Algeria) Mounir Djellili | 8 | 2 | 1 |
| G/F | 9 | (Algeria) Youcef Boudoumi | 9 | 6 | 3 |
| C | 10 | (Algeria) Omar Belliche | DNP | | |
| F | 11 | (Algeria) Farouk Bellakhdar | DNP | | |
| F | 13 | (Algeria) Abderraouf Bellakhdar | 0 | 1 | 0 |
Head coach:
(Algerian Basketball Federation) Djamel Rekik

=== Second leg ===
TV6

Sat, June 14
16:45

Boxscore

| NA Hussein Dey | 59–70 | NB Staouéli |
Scoring by quarter: 14–24, 19–17, 13–17, 13–12
| Pts: Boudoumi 12; Rebs: Hasnaoui 10; Asts: Guermat 4 | | Pts: Yahya 27; Rebs: Bensalah 8 Asts: Bensalah, Sedoud 5 |
NB Staouéli wins series, 2–0

La Coupole d'Alger Arena, Dély Ibrahim, Algiers
Referees: Sofiane Si Youcef, Adlane Larouci, Anis Bennani

| Starters: | | | Pts | Reb | Ast |
|---|---|---|---|---|---|
| PF | 4 | (Algeria) Abdesselam Semrouni | 8 | 9 | 3 |
| SF | 6 | (Algeria) Sif Eddine Benbrahim | 10 | 5 | 3 |
| PG | 8 | (Algeria) Mohamed Zaki Guermat | 9 | 3 | 4 |
| G | 12 | (Algeria) Mohamed Amine Hasnaoui | 6 | 10 | 0 |
| PG | 14 | (Algeria) Abdelkrim Ziane | | | |
| Reserves: | | | | | |
| G | 5 | (Algeria) Ramzi Fouad Bellakhdar | DNP | | |
| PG | 7 | (Algeria) Mounir Djellili | 0 | 0 | 1 |
| G/F | 9 | (Algeria) Youcef Boudoumi | 12 | 4 | 1 |
| C | 10 | (Algeria) Omar Belliche | DNP | | |
| PF | 11 | (Algeria) Farouk Bellakhdar | DNP | | |
| F | 13 | (Algeria) Abderraouf Bellakhdar | DNP | | |
| G/F | 15 | (Algeria) Rayan Hamdi | 3 | 2 | 0 |
Head coach:
(Algerian Basketball Federation) Djamel Rekik

| NA Hussein Dey | NB Staouéli |

| NA Hussein Dey | Statistics | NB Staouéli |
|---|---|---|
| 19/47 (40%) | 2-pt field goals | 14/27 (51%) |
| 2/17 (11%) | 3-pt field goals | 8/30 (26%) |
| 15/24 (62%) | Free throws | 18/24 (75%) |
| 20 | Offensive rebounds | 11 |
| 26 | Defensive rebounds | 28 |
| 46 | Total rebounds | 39 |
| 13 | Assists | 14 |
| 23 | Turnovers | 21 |
| 11 | Steals | 13 |
| 1 | Blocks | 5 |
| 14 (15) | Fouls | 16 (12) |

2025 Super Division champions
NB Staouéli
3rd Super Division title

| Starters: | | | Pts | Reb | Ast |
|---|---|---|---|---|---|
| PF | 7 | (Algeria) Mohamed Amine Bensalah | 9 | 8 | 5 |
| PF | 8 | (Algeria) Merouane Yahya | 27 | 5 | 2 |
| G | 10 | (Algeria) Abderraouf Benrighi | 6 | 7 | 0 |
| PG | 14 | (Algeria) Mohamed Boussad | 11 | 1 | 0 |
| PF | 15 | (Algeria) Hichem Dekakene | 4 | 1 | 0 |
| Reserves: | | | | | |
| PG | 4 | (Algeria) Anis Mohamed Fedala | 7 | 0 | 2 |
| G | 5 | (Algeria) Hamoud Slimani | 0 | 0 | 0 |
| G/F | 6 | (Algeria) Chakib Sedoud | 6 | 7 | 5 |
| SG | 9 | (Algeria) Sid Ali Ghrib | DNP | | |
| C | 11 | (Algeria) Zakaria Matoub | DNP | | |
| G/F | 12 | (Algeria) Sami Izedine Aious | 0 | 0 | 0 |
| G | 13 | (Algeria) Khaled Ouahab | 0 | 3 | 0 |
Head coach:
(Algerian Basketball Federation) Mohamed Yahya
