= 2026 Algerian Basketball Super Cup =

- Event: Algerian Basketball Super Cup
| NB Staouéli | NA Hussein Dey |
|---|---|
| 92 | 85 |
| Head coach: Mohamed Yahia | Head coach: Sofiane Boukelmoun |
- Date: 14 February 2026
- Venue: La Coupole d'Alger Arena, Dély Ibrahim, Algiers
- MVP: Mohamed Amine Bensalah
- Referees: Adlene Larouci, Anis Bennani, Wahid Latibi

The 2024–25 Algerian Basketball Super Cup was contested between NB Staouéli, holders of the Super Division and Algerian Cup double, and NA Hussein Dey. The match was played at La Coupole of the Complexe sportif olympique Mohamed Boudiaf in Algiers.

NB Staouéli won the title after two overtime periods, defeating NA Hussein Dey 92–85, following a 71–71 draw at the end of regulation time. The quarter scores were 13–11, 23–24, 19–19, and 16–17. The first overtime ended in a 7–7 tie, before Staouéli secured the victory in the second overtime (14–7). Hichem Dekakene (26 points) and Mohamed Amine Bensalah (24 points) were the top scorers of the final. Already crowned Super Division champions and Algerian Cup winners in the same season, NB Staouéli claimed their third trophy of the 2024–25 campaign.

== Game summarie ==
Sat, February 14
16:30

Boxscore

| NB Staouéli | 92–85 (OT) | NA Hussein Dey |
Scoring by quarter: 13–11, 23–24, 19–19, 16–17, Overtime: 21–14
| Pts: Dekakene 26; Rebs: Bensalah 11; Asts: Fedala, Yahya 5 | | Pts: Hamdi 20; Rebs: Hamdi 11; Asts: Mounir Djellili 8 |

La Coupole d'Alger Arena, Dély Ibrahim, Algiers
Referees: Adlene Larouci, Anis Bennani, Wahid Latibi

| Starters: | | | Pts | Reb | Ast |
|---|---|---|---|---|---|
| PG | 4 | (Algeria) Anis Mohamed Fedala | 5 | 7 | 5 |
| PF | 7 | (Algeria) Mohamed Amine Bensalah | 24 | 11 | 4 |
| PF | 8 | (Algeria) Merouane Yahya | 6 | 3 | 5 |
| G | 13 | (Algeria) Khaled Ouaheb | 13 | 10 | 1 |
| PF | 15 | (Algeria) Hicheme Dekakene | 26 | 2 | 2 |
| Reserves: | | | | | |
| G | 5 | (Algeria) Hamoud Slimani | DNP | | |
| SF | 6 | (Algeria) Zine Eddine Tifoura | DNP | | |
| G | 10 | (Algeria) Abderraouf Benrighi | 10 | 7 | 1 |
| C | 11 | (Algeria) Zakaria Maatoub | 1 | 3 | 1 |
| F | 12 | (Algeria) Sami Aious | DNP | | |
| PG | 14 | (Algeria) Mohamed Boussad | 7 | 1 | 2 |
Head coach:
(Algeria) Mohamed Yahia

| NB Staouéli | NA Hussein Dey |

| NB Staouéli | Statistics | NA Hussein Dey |
|---|---|---|
| 26/53 (49.1%) | 2-pt field goals | 21/47 (44.7%) |
| 7/32 (21.9%) | 3-pt field goals | 8/24 (33.3%) |
| 19/28 (67.9%) | Free throws | 19/37 (51.4%) |
| 12 | Offensive rebounds | 12 |
| 36 | Defensive rebounds | 43 |
| 48 | Total rebounds | 55 |
| 21 | Assists | 16 |
| | Turnovers | |
| | Steals | |
| | Blocks | |
| | Fouls | |

NB Staouéli
1st Super Cup title

| Starters: | | | Pts | Reb | Ast |
|---|---|---|---|---|---|
| C | 4 | (Algeria) Nabil Saidi | 16 | 9 | 0 |
| PG | 6 | (United States) Jimmy Williams | 19 | 4 | 2 |
| PG | 7 | (Algeria) Mounir Djellili | 10 | 6 | 8 |
| PF | 11 | (Algeria) Farouk Bellakhdar | 10 | 5 | 2 |
| G | 12 | (Algeria) Mohamed Amine Hasnaoui | 2 | 8 | 0 |
| Reserves: | | | | | |
| PF | 5 | (Algeria) Abdelmalek Gueraiche | DNP | | |
| SF | 8 | (Algeria) Aymen Djilali | DNP | | |
| PF | 9 | (Algeria) Redouane Haddad | 8 | 6 | 0 |
| PG | 10 | (Algeria) Abdelmalek Idir | DNP | | |
| G/F | 13 | (Algeria) Shems Eddine Messaoudi | DNP | | |
| C | 15 | (Algeria) Imad Eddine Behlouli | 0 | 0 | 0 |
| G/F | 16 | (Algeria) Rayan Hamdi | 20 | 11 | 4 |
Head coach:
(Algeria) Sofiane Boukelmoun
