= Algerian Basketball Super Cup =

- Organising body: Algerian Basketball Federation
- Founded: 1997
- Region: Algeria
- Number of clubs: 2
- Current champions: NB Staouéli (1st title)
- Most championships: WO Boufarik (2nd title)
- Current: 2026 Algerian Basketball Super Cup

The Algerian Basketball Super Cup (Arabic: كأس الجزائر الممتازة) is an Algerian Basketball competition held as a game between the reigning champions of the Super Division and the Algerian Cup. The first edition was held in 1997.

== History ==
On January 31, 2024, the Algerian Basketball Federation (FABB) announced the scheduling of the Basketball Super Cup match on February 11, 2025, at La Coupole d'Alger Arena between WO Boufarik, the Super Division champion, and USM Alger, the Algerian Cup champion. WO Boufarik beat USM Alger with a score of 70–59.

On February 14, 2026, NB Staouéli won the title after two overtime periods, defeating NA Hussein Dey 92–85, following a 71–71 draw at the end of regulation time. The quarter scores were 13–11, 23–24, 19–19, and 16–17. The first overtime ended in a 7–7 tie before Staouéli secured the victory in the second overtime (14–7). Hichem Dekakene (26 points) and Mohamed Amine Bensalah (24 points) were the top scorers of the final. Already crowned Super Division champions and Algerian Cup winners in the same season, NB Staouéli claimed their third trophy of the 2024–25 campaign.

== Winners ==
Key to the table
‡	Match was won during Over time

Year	Winners	Score	Runners-up	Venue
1997	WO Boufarik; Winner of Super Division	96 – 66	SR Annaba; Winner of Algerian Cup	Hacène Harcha Arena, Algiers
2025	WO Boufarik; Winner of Super Division	70 – 59	USM Alger; Winner of Algerian Cup	La Coupole d'Alger Arena, Algiers
2026	NB Staouéli; Winner of Super Division	92 – 85‡	NA Hussein Dey; Runner-up of Super Division	La Coupole d'Alger Arena, Algiers

== Performance by club ==
Club	Winners	Runners-up	Winning seasons	Runners-up seasons
WO Boufarik	2	—	1997, 2025	—
NB Staouéli	1	—	2026	—
NA Hussein Dey	—	1	—	2026
SR Annaba	—	1	—	1997
USM Alger	—	1	—	2025

== See also ==
- Algerian Basketball Championship
- Algerian Basketball Cup
