= 2026–27 Algerian Basketball Championship =

Super Division
- Season: 2026–27
- Duration: September 11, 2026 – (play-in tournament)
- Teams: 14

Records
- Biggest away win: CRB Dar Beida 11–74 NB Staouéli (September 19, 2026)
- Highest scoring: US Sétif 116–114 CRB Dar Beida (October 27, 2026)
- All statistics correct as of September 22, 2026.

The 2026–27 Super Division (65th edition), Algeria's top tier basketball club competition, ran from September 11, 2026.

== Review ==
The 2026-27 basketball season in Algeria begin on September 11 and 12, 2026, with the resumption of the Super Division, the Algerian Basketball Federation (FABB) announced following a coordination meeting with the clubs held in Algiers. The 14 participating teams are: WO Boufarik, NB Staouéli, CS Tlemcen, Rouiba CB, MC Alger, USM Alger, USM Blida, CR Béni Saf, CSC Djasr Kasentina, CRB Dar Beida, US Sétif, NA Hussein Dey, CSM Oran and WRB El Eulma. The meeting between the FABB and club representatives addressed several issues related to the new season, with the aim of establishing a common vision and improving the organization and competitive level of the national championships. The federation also called on all stakeholders to prioritize the interests of Algerian basketball and continue their efforts to promote the professionalization and development of the sport.

CSM Oran made its debut in the Super Division 2026–27 season following its promotion to the top tier. In their first official match in the division, the club lost 66–52 to MC Alger at the La Lofa Sports Hall in Oran. Despite the defeat, CSM Oran remained competitive for much of the game before conceding in the decisive stages. Founded in 2023, the club reached the top division for the first time in its history. In other matches of the opening round, CR Béni Saf defeated Rouiba CB 87–81, NB Staouéli defeated WRB El Eulma 84–67, and CS Tlemcen defeated CSC Djasr Kasentina 67–49. On 12 September, USM Alger defeated US Sétif 87–59, while NA Hussein Dey were awarded a 20–0 victory over CRB Dar Beida after the latter forfeited the match.

The third round of Super Division was marked by the defending champions WO Boufarik's first defeat of the season, as they lost 81–80 at home to MC Alger after leading by 11 points at the end of the third quarter. MCA staged a remarkable comeback in the closing minutes to join NB Staouéli at the top of the standings, with both teams remaining unbeaten after three consecutive victories. USM Alger secured a comfortable 75–54 victory over newly promoted CM Oran, recording their second win of the season. Meanwhile, USM Blida claimed an away victory against Rouiba CB (62–50). Elsewhere, US Sétif recorded their first win of the season with a 69–53 victory over NA Hussein Dey, while CS Tlemcen defeated newly promoted WRB El Eulma 80–41. Finally, CSC Djasr Kasentina earned their first victory of the campaign by beating CRB Dar Beida 71–52.

== Venues and locations ==
=== Promotion and relegation (pre-season) ===
A total of 14 teams will contest the league, including 12 sides from the 2025–26 season and two promoted from the 2025–26 National 1.

Teams promoted from National 1

- CM Oran
- WRB El Eulma

Teams relegated to National 1

- TRA Draria
- Ouled Chebel Basket Ball
Locations of teams for the 2026–27 Algerian Basketball Championship
Algiers Province clubs

Promoted from National 1

Team	Home city	Arena
CR Beni Saf	Béni Saf	Salle OMS Yousfi Said
CS Tlemcen	Tlemcen	Salle OMS Kara Zaitri Imama
CSC Djasr Kasentina	Djasr Kasentina	Salle omnisport de Douéra
CRB Dar Beida	Dar El Beïda	Salle OMS de Dar El Beïda
CM Oran	Oran	
WRB El Eulma	El Eulma	Salle Mohamed Sayeh Kechkouchi
NA Hussein Dey	Algiers	Salle Mohamed Handjer
MC Alger	Hydra	Salle OMS Abdelaziz Ben Tifour
NB Staouéli	Staoueli	Salle OMS de Staouéli
Rouiba CB	Rouïba	Salle OMS Mohamed Kadiri
US Sétif	Sétif	Salle 8 Mai 1945
USM Alger	Algiers	Salle OMS Mourad Boukechoura
USM Blida	Blida	Salle Hocine Chalane
WO Boufarik	Boufarik	Salle Moussa Cheraf

== Regular season ==
=== League table ===
Pos	Team	Pld	W	L	GF	GA	GD	Pts	
1	NB Staouéli	2	2	0	158	78	+80	4	Advance to play-off
2	WO Boufarik	2	2	0	148	114	+34	4	Advance to play-off
3	MC Alger	2	2	0	128	104	+24	4	Advance to play-off
4	NA Hussein Dey	2	2	0	87	64	+23	4	Advance to play-off
5	USM Alger	2	1	1	144	118	+26	3	Advance to play-off
6	Rouiba CB	2	1	1	171	161	+10	3	Advance to play-off
7	CS Tlemcen	2	1	1	119	111	+8	3	Advance to Play-in
8	CR Beni Saf	2	1	1	151	148	+3	3	Advance to Play-in
9	WRB El Eulma	2	1	1	133	137	−4	3	Advance to Play-in
10	USM Blida	2	1	1	121	139	−18	3	Advance to Play-in
11	CM Oran	2	0	2	104	132	−28	2	Advance to Play-down
12	CSC Djasr Kasentina	2	0	2	102	133	−31	2	Advance to Play-down
13	US Sétif	2	0	2	133	177	−44	2	Advance to Play-down
14	CRB Dar Beida	2	0	2	11	94	−83	1 (Note: CRB Dar Beida were deducted 1 points from tally for failing to appear for their first-round match against NA Hussein Dey.)	Advance to Play-down

First match(es) will be played: September 22, 2026. Source: FABB

=== Results ===
	CBS	CDB	CST	CSC	NBS	NAH	MCA	CMO	WEE	RCB	USS	UAL	USB	WOB	Rec.
CR Beni Saf		–	–	62–56; 2 Oct 4(1)	–	64–67; 18 Sep 2(1)	–	59–66; 13 Nov 11(1)	81–68; 16 Oct 6(1)	–	71–70 (OT); 31 Oct 9(1)	–	–	–	–
CRB Dar Beida	82–67; 23 Oct 7(1)		70–79; 2 Oct 4(1)	–	11–74; 19 Sep 2(1)	–	–	–	–	–	–	–	74–77; 31 Oct 9(1)	72–91; 12 Nov 11(1)	–
CS Tlemcen	53–50; 9 Oct 5(1)	–		–	–	–	–	–	80–41; 25 Sep 3(1)	67–59; 14 Nov 11(1)	–	–	68–54; 23 Oct 7(1)	70–80; 31 Oct 9(1)	–
CSC Djasr Kasentina	–	71–58; 25 Sep 3(1)	49–67; 11 Sep 1(1)		–	50–61; 13 Nov 11(1)	–	67–74; 23 Oct 7(1)	–	–	59–64; 10 Oct 5(1)	50–53; 31 Oct 9(1)	–	–	–
NB Staouéli	93–53; 25 Sep 3(1)	–	–	–		–	– 14 Nov 11(1)	–	84–67; 11 Sep 1(1)	– 31 Oct 9(1)	–	–	68–66; 8 Oct 5(1)	84–74; 23 Oct 7(1)	–
NA Hussein Dey	–	20–00; 12 Sep 1(1)	–	–	– 6 Nov 10(1)		53–94; 31 Oct 9(1)	61–58; 9 Oct 5(1)	–	–	53–69; 25 Sep 3(1)	– 23 Oct 7(1)	–	–	–
MC Alger	77–69; 27 Oct 8(1)	83–64; 17 Oct 6(1)	62–52; 18 Sep 2(1)	–	–	–		–	69–58; 2 Oct 4(1)	–	89–68; 6 Nov 10(1)	–	–	–	–
CM Oran	–	72–66; 7 Nov 10(1)	51–60; 27 Oct 8(1)	–	43–61; 13 Oct 6(1)	–	52–66; 11 Sep 1(1)		–	51–61; 2 Oct 4(1)	–	–	–	52–66; 18 Sep 2(1)	–
WRB El Eulma	–	66–56; 9 Oct 5(1)	–	66–53; 18 Sep 2(1)	–	–	–	57–62; 31 Oct 9(1)		–	65–74; 23 Oct 7(1)	61–85; 13 Nov 11(1)	–	–	–
Rouiba CB	81–87; 11 Sep 1(1)	–	–	70–68; 6 Nov 10(1)	–	97–88; 27 Oct 8(1)	69–70; 22 Oct 7(1)	–	–		–	–	50–62; 26 Sep 3(1)	62–70; 8 Oct 5(1)	–
US Sétif	–	116–114 (OT); 27 Oct 8(1)	70–63; 16 Oct 6(1)	–	53–62; 2 Oct 4(1)	–	–	–	–	74–90; 18 Sep 2(1)		–	62–68; 13 Nov 11(1)	–	–
USM Alger	–	–	74–77; 7 Nov 10(1)	–	– 27 Oct 8(1)	–	78–90; 10 Oct 5(1)	75–54; 26 Sep 3(1)	–	68–67; 3 Nov 6(1)	87–59; 12 Sep 1(1)		–	–	–
USM Blida	74–67; 7 Nov 10(1)	–	–	75–55; 16 Oct 6(1)	–	94–82; 2 Oct 4(1)	–	–	80–54; 27 Oct 8(1)	–	–	59–57; 18 Sep 2(1)		–	–
WO Boufarik	–	–	–	88–75; 27 Oct 8(1)	–	95–76; 15 Oct 6(1)	80–81; 26 Sep 3(1)	–	100–58; 6 Nov 10(1)	–	–	66–63; 1 Oct 4(1)	82–62; 22 Sep 1(1)		–
Record	–	–	–	–	–	–	–	–	–	–	–	–	–	–	

- Note: Small number and number in brackets indicate round number and leg, respectively

=== Clubs season-progress ===
Team ╲ Round	1	2	3	4	5	6	7	8	9	10	11	12	13	14	15	16	17	18	19	20	21	22	23	24	25	26
CRB Dar Beida	L	L	L	L	L	L	W	L	L	L	L															
CR Beni Saf	W	L	L	W	L	W	L	L	W	L	L															
CSC Djasr Kasentina	L	L	W	L	L	L	L	L	L	L	L															
CS Tlemcen	W	L	W	W	W	L	W	W	L	W	W															
NB Staouéli	W	W	W	W	W	W			W																	
NA Hussein Dey	W	W	L	L	W	L		L	L		W															
MC Alger	W	W	W	W	W	W	W	W	W	W																
CM Oran	L	L	L	L	L	L	W	L	W	W	W															
WRB El Eulma	L	W	L	L	W	L	L	L	L	L	L															
Rouiba CB	L	W	L	W	L	L	L	W	L	W	L															
US Sétif	L	L	W	L	W	W	W	W	L	L	L															
USM Alger	W	L	W	L	L	W			W	L	W															
USM Blida	L	W	W	W	L	W	L	W	W	W	W															
WO Boufarik	W	W	L	W	W	W		W	W	W	W															

Updated to match(es) played on November 14, 2026. Source: FABB
W = Win; L = Lose

== See also ==
- 2026–27 NB Staouéli season
- 2026–27 USM Alger basketball season
