= 2026–27 Algerian Women's Basketball Championship =

National 1
- Season: 2026–27
- Duration: September 25, 2026 – (play-in tournament)
- Teams: 14

Records
- Biggest home win: MT Sétif 102–27 SB Bejaia (October 30, 2026)
- Biggest away win: Rouiba CB 30–91 MC Alger (October 16, 2026)
- All statistics correct as of October 16, 2026.

The 2026–27 National 1 (65th edition), Algeria's top tier basketball club competition, ran from September 25, 2026.

== Review ==
The 2026–27 Algerian Women's Basketball National 1 Championship is scheduled to begin on 25 September 2026, according to the calendar announced by the Algerian Basketball Federation (FABB) following a coordination meeting with club representatives held in Algiers. The competition is the highest level of women's basketball league competition in Algeria. During the meeting, participants discussed several issues relating to the organisation of the new season and exchanged views on preparations for the start of the competitions. In its statement, the FABB highlighted the importance of dialogue, cooperation between clubs and the federation, and the promotion of Algerian basketball. The federation also reaffirmed its commitment to developing domestic competitions, supporting clubs, and improving the technical and organisational standards of Algerian basketball. It called on all stakeholders to continue their efforts to develop the sport and strengthen its professionalisation.

=== GS Cosider lead the standings as USM Alger defeat defending champions Hussein-Dey Marine ===
The second round of the National 1 saw GS Cosider, MC Alger, JF Kouba and USM Alger maintain unbeaten records with two consecutive victories. GS Cosider moved to the top of the standings after defeating Rouiba CB 83–28, following a 76–45 win over RC Bordj Bou Arreridj in the opening round. With 159 points scored and 73 conceded, the team recorded a points difference of +86. MC Alger secured second place with a 68–39 away victory over USA Batna, bringing their points difference to +49, while JF Kouba defeated EEI Annaba 64–47 away from home to occupy third place with a points difference of +46. USM Alger recorded the round's most notable result by defeating defending champions Hussein-Dey Marine 59–58 in Hydra. Having previously beaten MT Sétif in their opening match, USMA recorded their second consecutive victory and moved into fourth place with 118 points scored and 99 conceded. Hussein-Dey Marine, who had opened their campaign with a 65–23 victory over EEI Annaba, suffered their first defeat and dropped to fifth place with one win and one loss. EEI Annaba also recorded their second consecutive defeat, while USA Batna lost for the first time after winning their opening match against Rouiba CB.

In the Sixth Round GS Cosider strengthened its position at the top of the Nationale 1 with a sixth consecutive victory, defeating JF Kouba 73–48 in the sixth round. With 12 points, the leaders moved ahead of MC Alger and USM Alger, who both secured victories over FS Sétif (47–37) and NO Réghaïa (66–36), respectively. Both teams now have 11 points, alongside JF Kouba. RC Bordj Bou Arréridj defeated EI Annaba 60–52, while USA Batna overcame NB Staoueli 52–42 and Hussein Dey Marines won away against Rouiba CB (55–32). MT Sétif recorded the biggest victory of the round, crushing SB Béjaïa 102–27. In the standings, GS Cosider lead with 12 points, followed by MC Alger, USM Alger and JF Kouba with 11 points each. RC Bordj Bou Arréridj occupy fifth place with 10 points. USM Alger's victory keeps them firmly in contention for the top positions and within reach of the league leaders.

== Venues and locations ==
=== Promotion and relegation (pre-season) ===
Locations of teams for the 2026–27 Algerian Women's Basketball Championship
Algiers Province clubs

Promoted from National 2

Team	Home city	Arena
MC Alger	Hydra	Salle OMS Abdelaziz Ben Tifour
NB Staouéli	Staoueli	Salle OMS de Staouéli
Rouiba CB	Rouïba	Salle OMS Mohamed Kadiri
MT Sétif	Sétif	Salle 8 Mai 1945
USM Alger	Algiers	Salle OMS Abdelaziz Ben Tifour
FS Setifienne	Sétif	Salle OMS d'Aïn Arnat
RC Bordj Bou Arreridj	Bordj Bou Arreridj	
USA Batna		
Hussein Dey Marines		
EEI Annaba	Annaba	
JF Kouba	Kouba	
GS Cosider		
SB Bejaia	Bejaia	
NO Réghaïa	Réghaïa	Salle OMS Bouraada Wancharis

== Regular season ==
=== League table ===
Pos	Team	Pld	W	L	GF	GA	GD	Pts	
1	GS Cosider	4	4	0	284	142	+142	8	Advance to play-off
2	JF Kouba	4	4	0	173	204	−31	8	Advance to play-off
3	MC Alger	4	3	1	264	177	+87	7	Advance to play-off
4	USM Alger	4	3	1	252	216	+36	7	Advance to play-off
5	RC Bordj Bou Arreridj	4	3	1	213	214	−1	7	Advance to play-off
6	MT Sétif	4	2	2	191	205	−14	6	Advance to play-off
7	Hussein Dey Marines	4	2	2	218	163	+55	6	Advance to Play-in
8	NB Staouéli	4	2	2	178	193	−15	6	Advance to Play-in
9	FS Setifienne	4	1	3	151	223	−72	5	Advance to Play-in
10	USA Batna	4	1	3	190	219	−29	5	Advance to Play-in
11	NO Réghaïa	4	1	3	143	210	−67	5	Advance to Play-down
12	SB Bejaia	3	1	2	140	133	+7	4	Advance to Play-down
13	Rouiba CB	4	0	4	160	297	−137	4	Advance to Play-down
14	EEI Annaba	3	0	3	119	180	−61	3	Advance to Play-down

First match(es) will be played: October 16, 2026. Source: FABB

=== Results ===
	HDM	GSC	JFK	MCA	USAB	USMA	NBS	SBB	RCB	FSS	MTS	NOR	RBA	EIA	Rec.
Hussein Dey Marines		55–68; 23 Oct 5(1)	–	52–46; 6 Nov 7(1)	–	–	–	–	–	–	37–38; 9 Oct 3(1)	–	–	65–23; 25 Sep 1(1)	–
GS Cosider	–		73–48; 30 Oct 6(1)	–	–	–	–	–	83–28; 2 Oct 2(1)	62–29; 16 Oct 4(1)	–	–	76–45; 25 Sep 1(1)	–	–
JF Kouba	–	–		–	83–45; 23 Oct 5(1)	69–65; 9 Oct 3(1)	–	–	69–48; 6 Nov 7(1)	–	–	70–41; 25 Sep 1(1)	–	–	–
MC Alger	–	40–63; 9 Oct 3(1)	–		–	–	–	–	–	47–37; 30 Oct 6(1)	65–45; 25 Sep 1(1)	–	73–39; 23 Oct 5(1)	–	–
USA Batna	43–58; 16 Oct 4(1)	–	–	39–68; 3 Oct 2(1)		–	52–42; 30 Oct 6(1)	–	–	–	–	–	–	–	–
USM Alger	59–58; 3 Oct 2(1)	–	–	–	–		69–48; 16 Oct 4(1)	–	–	–	–	66–36; 30 Oct 6(1)	–	–	–
NB Staouéli	–	23–75; 5 Nov 7(1)	–	–	–	–		42–34; 25 Sep 1(1)	–	–	43–40; 23 Oct 5(1)	–	–	51–49 (OT); 9 Oct 3(1)	–
SB Bejaia	–	–	–	–	48–52; 7 Nov 7(1)	40–71; 23 Oct 5(1)	–		–	–	–	56–30; 9 Oct 3(1)	–	–	–
Rouiba CB	32–55; 30 Oct 6(1)	–	–	30–91; 16 Oct 4(1)	45–63; 25 Sep 1(1)	–	–	–		–	–	–	57–60; 9 Oct 3(1)	–	–
FS Setifienne	–	–	–	–	48–45; 9 Oct 3(1)	41–59; 25 Sep 1(1)	–	–	62–49; 23 Oct 5(1)		–	–	67–64; 6 Nov 7(1)	–	–
MT Sétif	–	–	51–70; 16 Oct 4(1)	–	–	–	–	102–27; 30 Oct 6(1)	–	57–33; 2 Oct 2(1)		–	–	–	–
NO Réghaïa	–	–	–	–	–	–	41–37; 2 Oct 2(1)	–	–	–	26–90; 7 Nov 7(1)		–	35–44; 23 Oct 5(1)	–
RC Bordj Bou Arreridj	–	–	–	–	–	–	–	61–50; 2 Oct 2(1)	–	–	–	47–31; 16 Oct 4(1)		60–52; 30 Oct 6(1)	–
EEI Annaba	–	–	47–64; 2 Oct 2(1)	–	–	32–72; 6 Nov 7(1)	–	39–44; 16 Oct 4(1)	–	–	–	–	–		–
Record		–	–	–	–	–	–	–	–	–	–	–	–	–	

- Note: Small number and number in brackets indicate round number and leg, respectively
