= 2024–25 Algerian Basketball Cup =

2025 Algerian Basketball Cup
Tournament details
- Country: Algeria
- Dates: April 15 – June 17
- Teams: 16
- Defending champions: USM Alger

Final positions
- Champions: NB Staouéli
- Runners-up: USM Alger
- Semifinalists: TRA Draria; WO Boufarik

Tournament statistics
- Matches played: 15

The 2024–25 Algerian Basketball Cup was the 56th edition of the Algerian Basketball Cup. Consistent information from the Algerian Basketball Federation indicating the possibility of canceling the Algerian Cup final for the 2024–25 season. NB Staouéli, the newly crowned 2025 Algerian champions, clinched the 54th edition of the Algerian Cup by defeating title holders USM Alger with a score of 59–46. With this victory, the club completes a remarkable league and cup double their second in history, following the one achieved in 2007 under the name DRB Staouéli.

USM Alger, boasting four Super Division titles (1966, 1967, 1969, 2023) and last season’s Algerian Cup winners, fielded a youthful squad led by rising talents such as 2.16m (7'1") center Faredj Messaoudi (22 years old). However, Staouéli’s experience showed in the second half, as coach Mohamed Yahia’s men, driven by the international quartet of Chakib Sedoud, Zakaria Maatoub, Mohamed Boussad, and Mohamed Amine Bensalah, took control of the game.

The match was played in front of a record crowd, with passionate supporters from both clubs filling the stands of the Coupole of the Mohamed Boudiaf Olympic Complex. This fourth Algerian Cup triumph for NB Staouéli (after previous wins in 1999, 2000, and 2007) crowns a historic season for the team and further cements its place among the elite of Algerian basketball.

== Bracket ==
The draw for the Algerian Cup for the 2024–25 sports season take place on April 3, 2025 at 4:00 p.m. at the conference room of the Algerian Olympic Committee (COA) in Ben Aknoun.

Round of 16; 15–29 April
USM Alger	74
NA Hussein Dey	63
M Ouled Chebel	20
ASS Oum El Bouaghi	00
TRA Draria	67
CS Tlemcen	46
Rouiba CB	58
US Sétif	50
CSC Djasr Kasentina	71
WA Boufarik	62
NB Staouéli	83
CRB Dar Beida	60
USM Blida	44
WO Boufarik	86
CR Beni Saf	80
MC Alger	77

Quarter-finals; 10 May
USM Alger	66
M Ouled Chebel	47
TRA Draria	71
Rouiba CB	68
CSC Djasr Kasentina	44
NB Staouéli	91
WO Boufarik	88
CR Beni Saf	65

Semi-finals; 4 June
USM Alger	79
TRA Draria	73
NB Staouéli	74
WO Boufarik	65

Final; 17 June
USM Alger	46
NB Staouéli	59
Third place

== Round of 16 ==
On April 24, 2025, Thanks to their victory against CRB Dar Beida 83-60, NB Staouéli secured a spot in the quarter-finals, joining Rouiba CB, who defeated US Sétif 58–50, and M Ouled Chebel, who advanced automatically following AS Oum Bouaghi's withdrawal.

April 15, 2025	M Ouled Chebel	20–00	ASS Oum El Bouaghi	Ouled Chebel
15:00
				Arena: Salle OMS Boualem Bouhedja; Referees: Bouarifi, Ghaib, Osmane

April 15, 2025	Rouiba CB	58–50	US Sétif	Rouïba
16:00	Scoring by quarter: 18–11, 17–12, 13–21, 10–6
		Boxscore		Arena: Salle OMS Mohamed Kadiri; Referees: Kahallou, Fouchene, Heddi

April 24, 2025	NB Staouéli	83–60	CRB Dar Beida	Staoueli
19:00	Scoring by quarter: –, –, –, –
		Boxscore		Arena: Salle de Staouéli; Referees: Kahallou, Rahali, Laoubi

April 29, 2025	TRA Draria	67–46	CS Tlemcen	Ouled Fayet
15:00	Scoring by quarter: 21–6, 22–12, 18–20, 6–8
		Boxscore		Arena: Salle OMS Ghazali Salem; Referees: Kahallou, Heddi, Laoubi

April 29, 2025	CR Beni Saf	80–77	MC Alger	Béni Saf
15:00	Scoring by quarter: –, –, –, –
		[ Boxscore]		Arena: Salle OMS Yousfi Said; Referees: Larouci, Berrah, Chaib

April 29, 2025	CSC Djasr Kasentina	71–62	WA Boufarik	Douéra
19:00	Scoring by quarter: 18–19, 15–20, 23–7, 15–16
		Boxscore		Arena: Salle OMS de Douéra; Referees: Osmane, Ghaib, Ferrani

April 29, 2025	USM Blida	44–86	WO Boufarik	Staoueli (Note: The match between USM Blida and WO Boufarik will be played behind closed doors at the Salle de Staouéli, following a decision by the Algerian Basketball Federation (FABB). This decision comes in response to the serious incidents that occurred during the previous encounter between the two teams, which took place in Blida as part of the 21st round of the Super Division.)
19:00	Scoring by quarter: –, –, –, –
		[ Boxscore]		Arena: Salle de Staouéli; Attendance: 0 (close doors); Referees: Bennani, Kaddour, Kahil

April 29, 2025	USM Alger	74–63	NA Hussein Dey	Algiers
19:00	Scoring by quarter: 21–15, 21–14, 19–20, 13–14
		Boxscore		Arena: Salle Rais Hamidou; Referees: Si Youcef, Hamada, Fouchene

== Quarter-finals ==
May 10, 2025	USM Alger	66–47	M Ouled Chebel	Staoueli
15:00	Scoring by quarter: 11–15, 21–4, 11–15, 23–13
		Boxscore		Arena: Salle de Staouéli; Referees: Ghaib, Fouchene, Kahil

May 10, 2025	TRA Draria	71–68	Rouiba CB	Dar El Beïda
18:00	Scoring by quarter: 17–14, 16–15, 21–19, 17–20
		Boxscore		Arena: Salle OMS Dar El Beïda; Referees: Bouarifi, Amrane, Rahali

May 10, 2025	CSC Djasr Kasentina	44–91	NB Staouéli	Hydra
18:00	Scoring by quarter: –, –, –, –
		Boxscore		Arena: Salle OMS Abdelaziz Ben Tifour; Referees: Larouci, Osmane, Heddi

May 10, 2025	WO Boufarik	88–65	CR Beni Saf	Ghriss (Note: In accordance with the Ministry of Youth and Sports directives dated April 24, 2025, the Algerian Basketball Federation (FABB) requested authorization to organize the match between WO Boufarik and CR Beni Saf with public attendance. The Directorate of Youth and Sports of Oran declined the request in an official letter dated May 5, 2025. The Federation then contacted the Directorate of Wilaya of Mascara, which approved the match on May 7, 2025, on the condition that it be held behind closed doors.)
16:00	Scoring by quarter: –, –, –, –
		[ Boxscore]		Arena: Salle OMS Ghriss; Attendance: 0 (close doors); Referees: Si Youcef, Bennani, Kaddour

== Semi-finals ==
June 4, 2025	USM Alger	79–73	TRA Draria	Dély Ibrahim, Algiers
16:00	Scoring by quarter: 22–20, 21–20, 19–15, 17–18
	Pts: Tarek Redouane 26; Rebs: Lamouri Merahi 9 Asts: Three players 6	Boxscore	Pts: Nouari, Hamdini 14; Rebs: Abdellah Hamdini 10; Asts: Four players 2	Arena: La Coupole d'Alger Arena; Referees: Adlen Larouci, M'hamed Berrah, Hamid Kaddour

June 4, 2025	NB Staouéli	74–65	WO Boufarik	Dély Ibrahim, Algiers
19:00	Scoring by quarter: 22–20, 15–17, 21–16, 16–12
	Pts: Hichem Dekakene 18; Rebs: Abderaouf Benrighi 9 Asts: Fedala, Dekakene 4	Boxscore	Pts: Djamel Achache 13; Rebs: Rabah Zitoun 11; Asts: Abdelhak Henna 4	Arena: La Coupole d'Alger Arena; Referees: Sofiane Si Youcef, Sofiane Hammada, Anis Bennani

== Final ==
June 17, 2025 Final	USM Alger	46–59	NB Staouéli	Dély Ibrahim, Algiers
16:00	Scoring by quarter: 14–9, 17–18, 7–23, 8–9
TV6	Pts: Merahi, Saidi 9 Rebs: F.Messaoudi 9 Asts: B.Messaoudi 5	Boxscore	Pts: Fedala 15; Rebs: Bensalah 9 Asts: Fedala 4	Arena: La Coupole d'Alger Arena; Referees: Sofiane Si Youcef, Adlen Larouci, Anis Bennani

Starters:			Pts	Reb	Ast
C	0	(Algeria) Nabil Saidi	9	8	0
SF	1	(Algeria) Ramdane Belhadj	4	2	1
PF	2	(Algeria) Laamouri Merahi	9	8	1
PG	10	(Algeria) Bouhaous Messaoudi	3	7	5
PF	11	(Algeria) Tarek Redouane	8	5	1
Reserves:					
PG	4	(Algeria) Zakariya Khodja	DNP		
PF	9	(Algeria) Moussa Bougria	8	4	1
PF	19	(Algeria) Badreddine Chaid	DNP		
SG	21	(Algeria) Bacim Medjoubi	0	1	1
F/C	24	(Algeria) Mohamd Amairia	2	1	0
C	26	(Algeria) Faredj Messaoudi	3	9	0
PG	29	(Algeria) Abdelmounaim Sedouki	DNP		
Head coach:
(Algerian Basketball Federation) Achour Sekhi

USM Alger	NB Staouéli

USM Alger	Statistics	NB Staouéli
14/39 (35%)	2-pt field goals	19/39 (48%)
4/21 (19%)	3-pt field goals	4/26 (15%)
6/12 (50%)	Free throws	9/16 (56%)
14	Offensive rebounds	9
36	Defensive rebounds	31
50	Total rebounds	40
10	Assists	9
21	Turnovers	11
3	Steals	11
2	Blocks	3
16 (10)	Fouls	11 (15)

Starters:			Pts	Reb	Ast
PF	7	(Algeria) Mohamed Amine Bensalah	6	9	1
PF	8	(Algeria) Merouane Yahya	0	1	1
G	10	(Algeria) Abderraouf Benrighi	4	2	0
PG	14	(Algeria) Mohamed Boussad	0	1	1
PF	15	(Algeria) Hichem Dekakene	12	3	1
Reserves:					
PG	4	(Algeria) Anis Mohamed Fedala	15	5	4
G	5	(Algeria) Hamoud Slimani	DNP		
G/F	6	(Algeria) Chakib Sedoud	14	7	1
SG	9	(Algeria) Sid Ali Ghrib	DNP		
C	11	(Algeria) Zakaria Maatoub	6	5	0
G/F	12	(Algeria) Sami Izedine Aious	DNP		
G	13	(Algeria) Khaled Ouahab	2	1	0
Head coach:
(Algerian Basketball Federation) Mohamed Yahya
