= 2024–25 Algerian Basketball Championship =

Super Division
- Season: 2024–25
- Duration: 8 November 2024 – 6 May 2025 (play-in tournament); 18 – 28 May 2025 (playoffs); 24 – 31 May 2025 (Playdowns); 13 – 14 June 2025 (Finals)
- Games played: 182
- Teams: 14

Regular season
- Top seed: NB Staouéli
- Relegated: Olympique Batna, OS Bordj Bou Arréridj

Finals
- Champions: NB Staouéli (3rd title)
- Runners-up: NA Hussein Dey
- Semifinalists: MC Alger, WO Boufarik

Records
- Biggest home win: NB Staouéli 101–48 Olympique Batna (14 December 2024)
- Biggest away win: Olympique Batna 57–92 CB Rouiba (6 December 2024)
- Highest scoring: NB Staouéli 108–102 CS Tlemcen (6 May 2025)
- Winning streak: 10 games NB Staouéli
- Losing streak: 15 games Olympique Batna
- All statistics correct as of May 31, 2025.

The 2024–25 Super Division (63rd edition), Algeria's top tier basketball club competition, ran from November 8, 2024, through June 14, 2025.

On May 26, 2024, CS Tlemcen achieved a historic entry into the Super Division, after successfully passing its three tests in the play-offs. This is the second consecutive accession of this formation, founded barely four years ago.

== Review ==
The kick-off of the Super Division for the 2024–25 season has been set for October 25. The new season will consist of a single group of 14 clubs, indicates the press release from the Algerian Basketball Federation (FABB). The first phase will be played in a two-legged format, 26 rounds in total. At the end of this phase, the top eight teams in the standings will play the Play-offs, while the remaining six teams will play the Play-downs. The FABB also announced the renewal of the decision prohibiting foreign players from playing in the Super Division, the FABB which set the deadline for submitting the commitment file to September 30.

NB Staouéli has been crowned Algerian Super Division Champion for the 2024–25 season. In the final, faced NA Hussein Dey and secured victory in both legs winning 69–67 in the first leg and 70–59 in the second leg. With this double triumph, NB Staouéli clinched the third national championship title in its history, following earlier successes in 2007 and in 2022. Guided by former international player Mohamed Yahia, the club succeeds WO Boufarik, who won the title in the 2023–24 season. NA Hussein Dey, narrowly missed out on what would have been the first national title in the club’s history.

== Venues and locations ==
=== Promotion and relegation (pre-season) ===
A total of 14 teams will contest the league, including 12 sides from the 2023–24 season and two promoted from the 2023–24 National 1.

Teams promoted from National 1

- Olympique Batna
- CS Tlemcen

Teams relegated to National 1

- CRB Dar Beida
- ASS Oum El Bouaghi
- US Sétif
- PS El Eulma
Locations of teams for the 2024–25 Algerian Basketball Championship

Promoted from National 1

Team	Home city	Arena
WO Boufarik	Boufarik	Salle Moussa Charef
NB Staouéli	Staoueli	Salle de Staouéli
CSC Djasr Kasentina	Djasr Kasentina	Salle omnisport de Douéra
NA Hussein Dey	Algiers	Salle Mohamed Handjer
TRA Draria	Draria	Salle OMS Ghazali Salem (Ouled Fayet)
CR Beni Saf	Béni Saf	Salle OMS Yousfi Said
OS Bordj Bou Arréridj	Bordj Bou Arréridj	Salle omnisports du 18 Février
MC Alger	Hydra	Salle OMS Abdelaziz Ben Tifour
USM Alger	Algiers	Salle OMS Mourad Boukechoura
Rouiba CB	Rouïba	Salle OMS Mohamed Kadiri
USM Blida	Blida	Salle Hocine Chalane
Ouled Chebel Basket Ball	Ouled Chebel	Salle OMS Boualem Bouhedja
Olympique Batna	Batna	Salle OMS 1er Novembre 1954
CS Tlemcen	Tlemcen	Salle OMS Kara Zaitri Imama

== Regular season ==
=== League table ===
Pos	Team	Pld	W	L	GF	GA	GD	Pts	
1	NB Staouéli	26	24	2	1988	1592	+396	50	Advance to playoffs
2	WO Boufarik	26	21	5	1997	1695	+302	47	Advance to playoffs
3	MC Alger	26	19	7	1853	1671	+182	45	Advance to playoffs
4	NA Hussein Dey	26	16	10	1862	1704	+158	42	Advance to playoffs
5	CR Beni Saf	26	15	11	1629	1645	−16	41	Advance to playoffs
6	CSC Djasr Kasentina	26	15	11	1619	1603	+16	41	Advance to playoffs
7	CS Tlemcen	26	14	12	1668	1636	+32	40	Advance to playoffs
8	USM Blida	26	13	13	1800	1825	−25	39	Advance to playoffs
9	USM Alger	26	13	13	1650	1590	+60	38 (Note: USM Alger were deducted 1 points.)	Advance to Play down
10	Rouiba CB	26	11	15	1662	1680	−18	37	Advance to Play down
11	TRA Draria	26	10	16	1628	1674	−46	36	Advance to Play down
12	OS Bordj Bou Arreridj	26	5	21	1677	1998	−321	31	Advance to Play down
13	M Ouled Chebel	26	4	22	1544	1783	−239	30	Advance to Play down
14	Olympique Batna	26	2	24	1515	1996	−481	28	Advance to Play down

First match(es) will be played: May 6, 2025. Source: FABB

=== Results ===
	CBS	CST	CSC	NBS	NAH	OMB	MCA	MOC	TRD	OSA	RCB	UAL	USB	WOB	Rec.
CR Beni Saf		63–59; 22 Apr 23(2)	66–54; 5 Apr 20(2)	45–65; 31 Jan 13(1)	65–58; 8 Mar 16(2)	68–43; 11 Apr 21(2)	68–79; 14 Feb 14(2)	69–44; 14 Jan 9(1)	63–61; 2 May 25(2)	85–41; 6 Dec 4(1)	73–66; 27 Dec 6(1)	55–54; 15 Nov 2(1)	71–73; 20 Mar 18(2)	50–61; 21 Jan 11(1)	9–4
CS Tlemcen	50–53; 17 Jan 10(1)		69–61; 18 Apr 22(2)	60–67; 15 Nov 2(1)	54–52; 21 Mar 18(2)	56–51; 2 May 25(2)	67–57; 7 Mar 16(2)	62–49; 25 Apr 24(2)	78–56; 14 Feb 14(2)	80–63; 27 Dec 6(1)	62–56; 10 Jan 8(1)	52–50; 6 Dec 4(1)	68–75; 5 Apr 20(2)	60–70; 31 Jan 13(1)	9–4
CSC Djasr Kasentina	65–63; 4 Jan 7(1)	67–55; 14 Jan 9(1)		62–67; 2 May 25(2)	74–66; 16 Nov 2(1)	63–52; 28 Mar 19(2)	49–62; 30 Jan 13(1)	71–49; 12 Apr 21(2)	70–56; 21 Jan 11(1)	55–48; 8 Mar 16(2)	53–57; 22 Mar 18(2)	60–59; 15 Feb 14(2)	69–57; 6 Dec 4(1)	64–67; 22 Apr 23(2)	9–4
NB Staouéli	92–49; 6 May 26(2)	70–57; 28 Feb 15(2)	82–60; 25 Jan 12(1)		73–71; 10 Jan 8(1)	101–48; 14 Dec 5(1)	86–67; 26 Dec 6(1)	70–59; 8 Nov 1(1)	69–59; 14 Mar 17(2)	117–74; 18 Apr 22(2)	81–64; 26 Apr 24(2)	66–63; 4 Apr 20(2)	90–70; 17 Jan 10(1)	66–63; 23 Nov 3(1)	13–0
NA Hussein Dey	79–53; 23 Nov 3(1)	66–55; 14 Dec 5(1)	59–66; 27 Feb 15(2)	58–80; 12 Apr 21(2)		84–71; 21 Jan 11(1)	63–64; 14 Jan 9(1)	94–74; 15 Mar 17(2)	81–64; 4 Jan 7(1)	92–67; 25 Jan 12(1)	79–55; 9 Nov 1(1)	69–52; 22 Apr 23(2)	70–67; 6 May 26(2)	95–96; 27 Mar 19(2)	9–4
Olympique Batna	60–62; 7 Jan 8(1)	58–62; 24 Jan 12(1)	74–80; 27 Dec 6(1)	61–94; 21 Mar 18(2)	43–67; 25 Apr 24(2)		50–72; 4 Apr 20(2)	77–68; 28 Jan 10(1)	62–77; 7 Mar 16(2)	82–45; 7 May 26(2)	57–92; 6 Dec 4(1)	53–77; 19 Apr 22(2)	73–79; 15 Nov 2(1)	57–81; 18 Feb 14(2)	3–10
MC Alger	80–63; 8 Nov 1(1)	71–65; 23 Nov 3(1)	73–58; 6 May 26(2)	52–65; 27 Mar 19(2)	67–69; 19 Apr 22(2)	80–60; 4 Jan 7(1)		69–65; 27 Feb 15(2)	75–57; 14 Dec 5(1)	84–69; 17 Jan 10(1)	69–61; 25 Jan 12(1)	70–62; 10 Jan 8(1)	83–75; 25 Apr 24(2)	65–61; 13 Mar 17(2)	11–2
M Ouled Chebel	41–44; 18 Apr 22(2)	51–53; 21 Jan 11(1)	61–74; 10 Jan 8(1)	61–70; 15 Feb 14(2)	57–69; 6 Dec 4(1)	82–41; 22 Apr 23(2)	71–81; 15 Nov 2(1)		77–63; 1 Feb 13(1)	61–67; 21 Mar 18(2)	52–74; 5 Apr 20(2)	60–66; 7 Mar 16(2)	60–58; 27 Dec 6(1)	53–92; 2 May 25(2)	3–10
TRA Draria	61–65; 25 Jan 12(1)	72–70; 8 Nov 1(1)	51–56; 26 Apr 24(2)	59–72; 31 Dec 4(1)	53–64; 4 Apr 20(2)	89–59; 23 Nov 3(1)	57–65; 22 Mar 18(2)	71–57; 6 May 26(2)		74–63; 10 Jan 8(1)	71–62; 17 Jan 10(1)	20–00; 27 Dec 6(1)	66–64; 18 Apr 22(2)	65–71; 27 Feb 15(2)	7–6
OS Bordj Bou Arreridj	69–71; 14 Mar 17(2)	60–74; 28 Mar 19(2)	59–56; 31 Dec 3(1)	67–76; 14 Jan 9(1)	85–68; 2 May 25(2)	82–68; 1 Feb 13(1)	64–84; 22 Apr 23(2)	61–74; 14 Dec 5(1)	71–78; 11 Apr 21(2)		64–71; 28 Feb 15(2)	63–67; 21 Jan 11(1)	79–83; 8 Nov 1(1)	70–67; 4 Jan 7(1)	4–9
Rouiba CB	62–54; 27 Mar 19(2)	55–61; 10 Apr 21(2)	57–46; 14 Dec 5(1)	45–57; 21 Jan 11(1)	71–85; 13 Feb 14(2)	66–50; 14 Mar 17(2)	53–79; 3 May 25(2)	60–58; 2 Jan 7(1)	74–68; 22 Apr 23(2)	67–49; 15 Nov 2(1)		59–65; 1 Feb 13(1)	52–55; 7 Mar 16(2)	64–67; 14 Jan 9(1)	6–7
USM Alger	72–75; 28 Feb 15(2)	71–59; 14 Mar 17(2)	51–52; 9 Nov 1(1)	71–62; 4 Jan 7(1)	64–61; 17 Jan 10(1)	92–53; 14 Jan 9(1)	71–68; 11 Apr 21(2)	62–42; 23 Nov 3(1)	63–58; 28 Mar 19(2)	79–63; 25 Apr 24(2)	64–87; 6 May 26(2)		76–61; 25 Jan 12(1)	61–79; 12 Dec 5(1)	9–4
USM Blida	70–66; 13 Dec 5(1)	62–77; 3 Jan 7(1)	60–67; 15 Mar 17(2)	80–90; 22 Apr 23(2)	51–59; 1 Feb 13(1)	86–66; 28 Feb 15(2)	88–86; 21 Jan 11(1)	79–66; 28 Mar 19(2)	61–65; 14 Jan 9(1)	76–55; 15 Feb 14(2)	79–63; 23 Nov 3(1)	69–66; 2 May 25(2)		74–72 (Note: The match was originally to be played on 10 April 2025, 6:00 p.m, to stop at the end of the second quarter due to riots. On April 12, the Algerian Basketball Federation announced a series of sanctions following incidents that occurred. USM Blida has been penalized with eight games behind closed doors and a fine of 80,000 Algerian Dinars. WO Boufarik has also been fined 50,000 Algerian Dinars, and the match is to be resumed from the beginning of the third quarter in a neutral venue behind closed doors in Hydra on April 20 at 5:00 PM, maintaining the score as it stood when the game was halted.); 20 Apr 21(2)	8–5
WO Boufarik	84–68; 25 Apr 24(2)	108–102; 6 May 26(2)	80–67; 17 Jan 10(1)	67–60; 6 Mar 16(2)	83–84; 26 Dec 6(1)	91–46; 9 Nov 1(1)	55–51; 6 Dec 4(1)	82–50; 25 Jan 12(1)	62–57; 16 Nov 2(1)	109–78; 5 Apr 20(2)	82–68; 18 Apr 22(2)	74–72; 20 Mar 18(2)	70–48; 10 Jan 8(1)		12–1
Record	6–7	5–8	6–7	11–2	7–6	13–0	8–5	1–12	3–10	1–12	5–8	4–9	4–9	9–4	

- Note: Small number and number in brackets indicate round number and leg, respectively

=== Clubs season-progress ===
Team ╲ Round	1	2	3	4	5	6	7	8	9	10	11	12	13	14	15	16	17	18	19	20	21	22	23	24	25	26
CS Tlemcen	L	L	L	W	L	W	W	W	L	L	W	W	L	W	L	W	L	W	W	L	W	W	L	W	W	L
Olympique Batna	L	L	L	L	L	L	L	L	L	W	L	L	L	L	L	L	L	L	L	L	L	L	L	L	L	W
CR Beni Saf	L	W	L	W	L	W	L	W	W	W	L	W	L	L	W	W	W	L	L	W	W	W	W	L	W	L
CSC Djasr Kasentina	W	W	L	W	L	W	W	W	W	L	W	L	L	W	W	W	W	L	W	L	W	L	L	W	L	L
NB Staouéli	W	W	W	W	W	W	L	W	W	W	W	W	W	W	W	L	W	W	W	W	W	W	W	W	W	W
NA Hussein Dey	W	L	W	W	W	W	W	L	L	L	W	W	W	W	L	L	W	L	L	W	L	W	W	W	L	W
MC Alger	W	W	W	L	W	L	W	W	W	W	L	W	W	W	W	L	W	W	L	W	L	L	W	W	W	W
M Ouled Chebel	L	L	L	L	W	W	L	L	L	L	L	L	W	L	L	L	L	L	L	L	L	L	W	L	L	L
TRA Draria	W	L	W	L	L	W	L	W	W	W	L	L	L	L	L	W	L	L	L	L	W	W	L	L	L	W
OS Bordj Bou Arreridj	L	L	W	L	L	L	W	L	L	L	L	L	W	L	L	L	L	W	L	L	L	L	L	L	W	L
Rouiba CB	L	W	L	W	W	L	W	L	L	L	L	L	L	L	W	L	W	W	W	W	L	L	W	L	L	W
USM Alger	L	L	W	L	L	L	W	L	W	W	W	W	W	L	L	W	W	L	W	L	W	W	L	W	L	L
USM Blida	W	W	W	L	W	L	L	L	L	L	W	L	L	W	W	W	L	W	W	W	W	L	L	L	W	L
WO Boufarik	W	W	L	W	W	L	L	W	W	W	W	W	W	W	W	W	L	W	W	W	L	W	W	W	W	W

Updated to match(es) played on AMay 6, 2025. Source:
W = Win; L = Lose

== Playoffs ==
At the end of the 1st phase, the teams ranked from 1st to 8th place will be divided into two groups A and B, each composed of four teams according to the serpentine system. Each group (A and B) will play a 3-day tournament on a neutral ground that will be designated by the FABB. At the end of these two tournaments, the teams ranked 1 and 2 of each group A and B will play an Aces tournament with direct elimination as follows:

- 1st of group A will play against 2nd of group B
- 1st of group B will play against 2nd of group A

=== Group A ===
Pos	Team	Pld	W	L	GF	GA	GD	Pts	
1	NB Staouéli	3	3	0	243	176	+67	6	Qualification to the Semi-finals
2	NA Hussein Dey	3	2	1	232	230	+2	5	Qualification to the Semi-finals
3	USM Blida	3	1	2	200	263	−63	4	
4	CR Beni Saf	3	0	3	245	251	−6	3	

First match(es) will be played: May 22, 2025. Source: FABB

May 18, 2025 Round 1	NA Hussein Dey	84–74	CR Beni Saf	La Coupole d'Alger Arena, Dély Ibrahim, Algiers
16:30	Scoring by quarter: 29–20, 23–11, 12–21, 20–22
	Pts: Rayan Hamdi 23; Rebs: Mohamed Amine Hasnaoui 17; Asts: Mohamed Zaki Guemmat 13	Boxscore	Pts: Three players 12; Rebs: Mohamed Azzi 9 Asts: Aissam Benarbia 9	Referees: Adlen Larouci, M'hamed Berrah, Sid Ali Osmane

May 18, 2025 Round 1	NB Staouéli	78–75	USM Blida	La Coupole d'Alger Arena, Dély Ibrahim, Algiers
19:00	Scoring by quarter: 12–15, 27–17, 23–22, 16–21
	Pts: Chakib Sedoud 20; Rebs: Khaled Oahab 8 Asts: Mohamed Anis Fedala 6	Boxscore	Pts: Mohamed Zahaf 22; Rebs: Azzeddine Boulesnane 9 Asts: Moussaab Koob 6	Referees: Sofiane Si Youcef, Hamid Kaddour, Sofiane Hammada

May 20, 2025 Round 2	USM Blida	87–81	CR Beni Saf	La Coupole d'Alger Arena, Dély Ibrahim, Algiers
16:30	Scoring by quarter: 21–20, 20–20, 28–22, 18–19
	Pts: Faiz chillegue 22; Rebs: Azzeddine Boulesnane 12; Asts: Mohamed Zahaf 5	Boxscore	Pts: Djamel Mezrai 20; Rebs: Maziz, Douifi 9 Asts: Benarbia, Moussa Benyacine 6	Referees: Hamid Kaddour, Sofiane Hammada, Anis Bennani

May 20, 2025 Round 2	NB Staouéli	73–56	NA Hussein Dey	La Coupole d'Alger Arena, Dély Ibrahim, Algiers
19:00	Scoring by quarter: 20–19, 10–15, 27–9, 16–13
	Pts: Mohammed Amine Bensalah 21; Rebs: Abderaouf Berrighi 15; Asts: Dekakene, Yahya 5	Boxscore	Pts: Mohamed Amine Hasnaoui 13; Rebs: Sif Eddine Benbrahim 7 Asts: Ziane, Guemmat 4	Referees: Sofiane Si Youcef, M'hamed Berrah, Adlen Larouci

May 22, 2025 Round 3	NA Hussein Dey	92–83	USM Blida	La Coupole d'Alger Arena, Dély Ibrahim, Algiers
16:30	Scoring by quarter: 20–18, 23–21, 21–19, 28–25
	Pts: Rayan Hamdi 27; Rebs: Mohamed Amine Hasnaoui 16; Asts: Mohamed Zaki Guemmat 11	Boxscore	Pts: Moussaab Koob 23; Rebs: Moussaab Koob 7 Asts: Mohamed Boudoumi 5	Referees: Sofiane Si Youcef, Sofiane Hammada, Adlen Larouci

May 22, 2025 Round 3	CR Beni Saf	45–92	NB Staouéli	La Coupole d'Alger Arena, Dély Ibrahim, Algiers
19:00	Scoring by quarter: 11–28, 19–17, 12–20, 3–27
	Pts: Djamel Mezrai 17; Rebs: Mohamed Douifi 11; Asts: Houcem Moussa Benyacine 5	Boxscore	Pts: Hichem Dekakene 15; Rebs: Abderaouf Berrighi 8 Asts: Mohamed Boussad 6	Referees: Anis Bennani, M'hamed Berrah, Yacine Kahil

=== Group B ===
Pos	Team	Pld	W	L	GF	GA	GD	Pts	
1	WO Boufarik	3	3	0	208	177	+31	6	Qualification to the Semi-finals
2	MC Alger	3	2	1	218	194	+24	5	Qualification to the Semi-finals
3	CSC Djasr Kasentina	3	1	2	187	196	−9	4	
4	CS Tlemcen	3	0	3	206	252	−46	3	

First match(es) will be played: May 23, 2025. Source: FABB

May 19, 2025 Round 1	MC Alger	58–57	CSC Djasr Kasentina	La Coupole d'Alger Arena, Dély Ibrahim, Algiers
16:30	Scoring by quarter: 13–15, 11–17, 19–7, 15–18
	Pts: Merouane Bourkaib 17; Rebs: Touhami Ghezzoul 16; Asts: Merouane Bourkaib 4	Boxscore	Pts: Zakaria Aggoun 12; Rebs: Lotfi Adrar 10; Asts: Brahim Mahdi Haichour 5	Referees: Adlen Larouci, Hamid Kaddour, Anis Bennani

May 19, 2025 Round 1	WO Boufarik	77–62	CS Tlemcen	La Coupole d'Alger Arena, Dély Ibrahim, Algiers
19:00	Scoring by quarter: 25–15, 14–20, 22–12, 16–15
	Pts: Louai Chebel 15; Rebs: Mohamed Seddik Touati 10; Asts: Four players 4	Boxscore	Pts: Mostefa Braik 17; Rebs: Yassine Benyahia 17; Asts: Mostefa Braik 4	Referees: Sofiane Si Youcef, Mohamed Bouarifi, Sofiane Hammada

May 21, 2025 Round 2	CS Tlemcen	70–73	CSC Djasr Kasentina	La Coupole d'Alger Arena, Dély Ibrahim, Algiers
16:30	Scoring by quarter: 20–18, 19–20, 14–22, 17–13
	Pts: Yassine Benyahia 24; Rebs: Aymen Ahmed Settouti 9 Asts: Three players 4	Boxscore	Pts: Sid Ahmed Bensalah 16; Rebs: Three players 6 Asts: Zakaria Guezout 6	Referees: Adlen Larouci, Anis Bennani, Mohamed Marouf

May 21, 2025 Round 2	WO Boufarik	63–58	MC Alger	La Coupole d'Alger Arena, Dély Ibrahim, Algiers
19:00	Scoring by quarter: 21–14, 13–16, 17–12, 12–16
	Pts: Louai Chebel 14; Rebs: Rabah Zitoun 13; Asts: Abdelhak Henna 6	Boxscore	Pts: Ramzi Merahi 17; Rebs: Ramzi Merahi 8 Asts: Bourkaib, Merahi 4	Referees: Sofiane Si Youcef, Sofiane Hammada, Hamid Kaddour

May 23, 2025 Round 3	MC Alger	102–74	CS Tlemcen	La Coupole d'Alger Arena, Dély Ibrahim, Algiers
16:30	Scoring by quarter: 23–24, 28–9, 27–17, 24–24
	Pts: Mustapha Adrar 18; Rebs: Touhami Ghezzoul 16; Asts: Three players 6	Boxscore	Pts: Mostefa Braik 27; Rebs: Yassine Benyahia 11; Asts: Mostefa Braik 6	Referees: Adlen Larouci, Anis Bennani, Zakaria Fouchene

May 23, 2025 Round 3	CSC Djasr Kasentina	57–68	WO Boufarik	La Coupole d'Alger Arena, Dély Ibrahim, Algiers
19:00	Scoring by quarter: 17–11, 14–15, 14–29, 12–13
	Pts: Lotfi Adrar 15; Rebs: Brahim Mahdi Haichour 11; Asts: Lotfi Adrar 5	Boxscore	Pts: Abdelhak Henna 14; Rebs: Three players 10; Asts: Djamel Achache 4	Referees: Sofiane Si Youcef, Hamid Kaddour, Sofiane Hammada

==== Semi-finals ====
May 27, 2025 1st leg	NB Staouéli	84–73	MC Alger	La Coupole d'Alger Arena, Dély Ibrahim, Algiers
16:00	Scoring by quarter: 31–21, 15–15, 20–21, 18–16
	Pts: Chakib Sedoud 26; Rebs: Chakib Sedoud 13; Asts: Mohamed Anis Fedala 9	Boxscore	Pts: Touhami Ghezzoul 24; Rebs: Touhami Ghezzoul 15; Asts: Merouane Bourkaib 9	Referees: Sofiane Si Youcef, Adlen Larouci, Anis Bennani

May 27, 2025 1st leg	WO Boufarik	69–62	NA Hussein Dey	La Coupole d'Alger Arena, Dély Ibrahim, Algiers
19:00	Scoring by quarter: 27–21, 16–15, 14–9, 12–17
	Pts: Louai Chebel 14; Rebs: Mohamed Seddik Touati 11; Asts: Abdelhak Henna 8	Boxscore	Pts: Sif Eddine Benbrahim 14; Rebs: Semrouni, Hamdi 10; Asts: Guemmat, Hamdi 3	Referees: Hamid Kaddour, Sofiane Hammada, M'hamed Berrah

May 28, 2025 2nd leg	MC Alger	71–77	NB Staouéli	La Coupole d'Alger Arena, Dély Ibrahim, Algiers
16:00	Scoring by quarter: 18–21, 10–17, 24–16, 19–23
	Pts: Ramzi Merahi 24; Rebs: Youcef Khalfallah 11; Asts: Ramzi Merahi 7	Boxscore	Pts: Mohammed Amine Bensalah 20; Rebs: Mohammed Amine Bensalah 10; Asts: Three players 2	Referees: Adlen Larouci, Anis Bennani, M'hamed Berrah

May 28, 2025 2nd leg	NA Hussein Dey	98–90	WO Boufarik	La Coupole d'Alger Arena, Dély Ibrahim, Algiers
19:00	Scoring by quarter: 23–22, 27–27, 17–16, 31–25
	Pts: Mohamed Zaki Guemmat 26; Rebs: Hasnaoui, Semrouni 7 Asts: Mounir DJelali 5	Boxscore	Pts: Mohamed Akram Sahraoui 24; Rebs: Mohamed Seddik Touati 15; Asts: Tarek Hamdani 7	Referees: Sofiane Si Youcef, Hamid Kaddour, Sofiane Hammada

== Finals ==
At the end of these games, the winning teams will play two (2) Final matches, during which the Champion of Algeria for the 2024–25 sports season will be determined according to the FIBA system: If the score is tied at the end of the first game, no overtime will be played. (Article D.6.2 and Official FIBA Regulations). If the total score of the two games is tied at the end of the second game, the second game will continue with as many 5-minute overtimes as necessary to determine a winner. (Article D.6.3 and Official FIBA Regulations).

=== First leg ===
Friday, June 13
17:00

Boxscore

NB Staouéli	69–67	NA Hussein Dey
Scoring by quarter: 19–23, 15–6, 21–25, 14–13
Pts: Bensalah 24; Rebs: Bensalah 12; Asts: Yahya, Fedala 6		Pts: Hamdi 16; Rebs: Hamdi 14; Asts: Guermat 7
NB Staouéli leads series, 1–0

La Coupole d'Alger Arena, Dély Ibrahim, Algiers
Referees: Hamid Kaddour, Sofiane Hammada, M'hamed Berrah

=== Second leg ===
Saturday, June 14
16:45

Boxscore

NA Hussein Dey	59–70	NB Staouéli
Scoring by quarter: 14–24, 19–17, 13–17, 13–12
Pts: Boudoumi 12; Rebs: Hasnaoui 10; Asts: Guermat 4		Pts: Yahya 27; Rebs: Bensalah 8 Asts: Bensalah, Sedoud 5
NB Staouéli wins series, 2–0

La Coupole d'Alger Arena, Dély Ibrahim, Algiers
Referees: Sofiane Si Youcef, Adlane Larouci, Anis Bennani

== Play down ==
=== Playdown table ===
Pos	Team	Pld	W	L	GF	GA	GD	Pts	
1	USM Alger	5	4	1	368	303	+65	9	
2	M Ouled Chebel	5	3	2	336	361	−25	8	
3	Rouiba CB	5	3	2	370	335	+35	8	
4	TRA Draria	5	3	2	357	355	+2	8	
5	OS Bordj Bou Arreridj	5	2	3	329	332	−3	7	Relegation to National 1
6	Olympique Batna	5	0	5	306	380	−74	5	Relegation to National 1

First match(es) will be played: May 31, 2025. Source: FABB

==== First playdown ====
May 24, 2025 Round 1	Olympique Batna	61–78	M Ouled Chebel	Salle OMS Mohamed Kadiri, Rouïba
16:00	Scoring by quarter: 19–21, 14–21, 18–20, 10–16
	Pts: Yamame Hezil 19; Rebs: Mohamed Anouar Belaid 11; Asts: Oussama Koulib 3	Boxscore	Pts: Ayoub Amri 18; Rebs: Abderrahmane Fatnassi 11; Asts: Ahmed Allali 6	Referees: Sofiane Si Youcef, Hamid Kaddour, Sid Ali Osmane

May 24, 2025 Round 1	CB Rouiba	77–62	TRA Draria	Salle OMS Mohamed Kadiri, Rouïba
18:00	Scoring by quarter: 22–13, 14–17, 21–11, 20–21
	Pts: Mohamed Amine Roubai 27; Rebs: Sidali Ben Zaim 23; Asts: Abaz, Chenieff 4	Boxscore	Pts: Nouari, Gueddoudj 16; Rebs: Ait Ziane 6 Asts: Nabil Nouari 4	Referees: Anis Bennani, Sofiane Hammada, Mohamed Bouarifi

May 24, 2025 Round 1	USM Alger	76–48	OS Bordj Bou Arréridj	Salle OMS Mohamed Kadiri, Rouïba
20:00	Scoring by quarter: 23–10, 17–13, 20–8, 16–17
	Pts: Faredj Messaoudi 17; Rebs: Bouhaous Messaoudi 13; Asts: Bouhaous Messaoudi 7	Boxscore	Pts: Mehdi Aliane 11; Rebs: Anis Azzouz 11; Asts: Mehdi Aliane 6	Referees: Adlen Larouci, Mohamed Marouf, M'hamed Berrah

May 25, 2025 Round 2	TRA Draria	74–68	Olympique Batna	Salle OMS Mohamed Kadiri, Rouïba
16:00	Scoring by quarter: 15–14, 32–24, 19–17, 8–13
	Pts: Mohammed Ait Ziane 23; Rebs: Abdelmalek Aouana 10; Asts: Nabil Gueddoudj 6	Boxscore	Pts: Oussama Koulib 25; Rebs: Mohamed Anouar Belaid 14; Asts: Okba Mafoune 11	Referees: Sofiane Hammada, Mohamed Bouarifi, Mohamed Marouf

May 25, 2025 Round 2	OS Bordj Bou Arréridj	66–79	CB Rouiba	Salle OMS Mohamed Kadiri, Rouïba
18:00	Scoring by quarter: 17–21, 17–22, 17–14, 15–22
	Pts: Anis Azzouz 25; Rebs: Anis Azzouz 12; Asts: Mehdi Boutehra 7	Boxscore	Pts: Mohamed Amine Roubai 19; Rebs: Sidali Ben Zaim 10; Asts: Abdallah Hamoud Touchi 5	Referees: Sofiane Si Youcef, Hamid Kaddour, M'hamed Berrah

May 25, 2025 Round 2	M Ouled Chebel	63–73	USM Alger	Salle OMS Mohamed Kadiri, Rouïba
20:00	Scoring by quarter: 20–21, 14–23, 14–14, 15–15
	Pts: Ahmed Allali 14; Rebs: Ahmed Allali 11; Asts: Three players 3	Boxscore	Pts: Redouane, Belhadj 15; Rebs: Bouhaous Messaoudi 12; Asts: Zakaria Khoudja 5	Referees: Adlen Larouci, Anis Bennani, Yacine Kahil

==== Second playdown ====
May 29, 2025 Round 3	TRA Draria	73–61	OS Bordj Bou Arréridj	Salle OMS Abdelaziz Ben Tifour, Hydra
16:00	Scoring by quarter: 20–22, 23–6, 20–21, 10–12
	Pts: Mohammed Ait Ziane 24; Rebs: Aouana, Hamdini 12; Asts: Nabil Gueddoudj 9	Boxscore	Pts: Anis Azzouz 19; Rebs: Anis Azzouz 15; Asts: Mehdi Aliane 6	Referees: Adlen Larouci, Anis Bennani, Mohamed Bouarifi

May 29, 2025 Round 3	CB Rouiba	69–70	M Ouled Chebel	Salle OMS Abdelaziz Ben Tifour, Hydra
18:00	Scoring by quarter: 15–18, 18–9, 25–18, 11–25
	Pts: Adel Nehal 20; Rebs: Sidali Ben Zaim 16; Asts: Ziad Chenieff 6	Boxscore	Pts: Abdelwaheb Bounaas 17; Rebs: Ahmed Allali 16; Asts: Three players 3	Referees: Sofiane Si Youcef, Sofiane Hammada, Sidali Osmane

May 29, 2025 Round 3	USM Alger	73–58	Olympique Batna	Salle OMS Abdelaziz Ben Tifour, Hydra
20:00	Scoring by quarter: 18–18, 20–7, 22–15, 13–18
	Pts: Lamouri Merahi 16; Rebs: Lamouri Merahi 10; Asts: Ramadane Belhadj 5	Boxscore	Pts: Oussama Koulib 17; Rebs: Houssam Bouallag 8 Asts: Okba Mafoune 7	Referees: Hamid Kaddour, M'hamed Berrah, Imene Tahm

May 30, 2025 Round 4	M Ouled Chebel	81–75	TRA Draria	Salle OMS Abdelaziz Ben Tifour, Hydra
16:00	Scoring by quarter: 19–14, 19–18, 23–20, 20–23
	Pts: Slimane Boumedfa 18; Rebs: Fatnassi, Allali 8 Asts: Slimane Boumedfa 6	Boxscore	Pts: Abdellah Hamdini 20; Rebs: Abdelmalek Aouana 8 Asts: Nabil Gueddoudj 7	Referees: Adlen Larouci, Anis Bennani, Smail Heddi

May 30, 2025 Round 4	Olympique Batna	60–71	OS Bordj Bou Arréridj	Salle OMS Abdelaziz Ben Tifour, Hydra
18:00	Scoring by quarter: 8–14, 22–18, 16–9, 14–30
	Pts: Mohamed Anouar Belaid 15; Rebs: Mohamed Anouar Belaid 12; Asts: Three players 3	Boxscore	Pts: Mehdi Boutehra 25; Rebs: Aymene Aliane 8 Asts: Aliane.A, Boutehra 3	Referees: Sofiane Si Youcef, Imene Tahm, Amir Mohamed Rahali

May 30, 2025 Round 4	USM Alger	78–61	CB Rouiba	Salle OMS Abdelaziz Ben Tifour, Hydra
20:00	Scoring by quarter: 16–16, 16–9, 21–14, 25–22
	Pts: Nabil Saidi 21; Rebs: Bouhaous Messaoudi 18; Asts: Moussa Bougria 9	Boxscore	Pts: Ziad Chenieff 24; Rebs: Abdelhakim Abaz 7 Asts: Ziad Chenieff 5	Referees: Hamid Kaddour, M'hamed Berrah, Sofiane Hammada

May 31, 2025 Round 5	OS Bordj Bou Arréridj	83–44	M Ouled Chebel	Salle OMS Abdelaziz Ben Tifour, Hydra
15:00	Scoring by quarter: 40–8, 17–19, 13–14, 13–3
	Pts: Anis Azzouz 30; Rebs: Salim Daifellah 14; Asts: Mehdi Boutehra 7	Boxscore	Pts: Abdelmalek Kaci 11; Rebs: Ahmed Allali 13; Asts: Allali, Bounaas 3	Referees: Anis Bennani, Hamid Kaddour, Sofiane Hammada

May 31, 2025 Round 5	CB Rouiba	84–57	Olympique Batna	Salle OMS Abdelaziz Ben Tifour, Hydra
17:00	Scoring by quarter: 29–8, 22–8, 16–17, 17–24
	Pts: Mohamed Wassim Haouchine 31; Rebs: Zadra, Zanaz 11; Asts: Said Belhoucine 5	Boxscore	Pts: Salama Benradi 16; Rebs: Salama Benradi 11; Asts: Salah Eddine Djelloul 4	Referees: Imene Tahm, M'hamed Berrah, Mohamed Marouf

May 31, 2025 Round 5	TRA Draria	73–68	USM Alger	Salle OMS Abdelaziz Ben Tifour, Hydra
19:00	Scoring by quarter: 14–15, 15–16, 19–23, 25–14
		[ Boxscore]
