= NB Staouéli =

- 2026–27 NB Staouéli season
- Nickname: Les dauphins de Staoueli
- Leagues: Algerian Basketball Championship
- Founded: Sport Staouéli (1949–1964); Djamia Riyadiah Baladiyat Staouéli (1964–2008); Nadi Basket Staouéli since 2008
- Arena: Salle de Staouéli, Staoueli
- Location: Staouéli, Algeria
- Team colors: Blue, white, orange
- President: Sofiane Elarbi Mahmoudi
- Head coach: Mohamed Yahya
- Championships: 3 Algerian Leagues; 4 Algerian Cups; 1 Algerian Super Cups
Home	Away

NB Staouéli (Nadi Baladiat Staouéli) are an Algerian basketball club based in Staouéli, a coastal suburb of Algiers. The team has become one of the most competitive clubs in the Algerian Basketball Championship in the recent years, and also participated in the Basketball Africa League (BAL) qualifiers.

== History ==
Founded in 1949, the club originally held the name Sport Staouéli, then Djamia Riyadiah Baladiyat Staouéli (DRBS) in 1964, and eventually NB Staouéli since 2008. NB Staouéli won its first Algerian Cup title in 1999 against WA Boufarik (71-58) and the second in 2000 against MC Alger (82-81). On the other hand, NBS failed in 1973 against Darak El-Watani (65-52) and in 1993 against MCA (70-68).

On April 14, 2007, DRB Staouéli won the league title for the first time in its history. Six teams competed in the playoffs, after they won four matches including the deciding match was held in Staoueli Hall against the defending champion MC Alger. The latter left the hall in the sixth minute of the second quarter, when the score was 28 to 21 in favor of DRB Staouéli, the climate was very tense. Referring to the regulations, the technical commission chaired by international referee Chachoua Noureddine, took the decision to inflict a lost match by penalty on MC Alger.

NB Staouéli's coach Ahmed Loubachria stated “We are disappointed by the conduct of the MCA. It is unworthy of his rank. Leaving the court is not part of basketball. This action tarnished the image of the ball in the basket. I congratulate my players for their performance”. Two weeks later, DRB Staouéli won another title by winning the Algerian Cup against WA Boufarik, achieving the league and cup double for the first time.

After losing the league title twice in a row against GS Pétroliers, before the Super Division was suspended for two seasons due to the COVID-19 pandemic in Algeria. NB Staouéli was crowned Algerian Super Division champion for the 2021–22 season by winning over WO Boufarik with a score of 64 to 59, during the last day of the Super-Division playoff tournament. This is the second championship title for the city of Staouéli after that won in 2007 under the name of DRB Staouéli. Undefeated during this playoffs, Yacine Ait-Kaci's men won during the first two days, respectively, ahead of CSC Djasr Kasentina (58-42) and MC Alger (81-74).

=== Complete Historic Domestic Treble in 2024–25 ===
During the 2024–25 season, NB Staouéli enjoyed one of the most successful campaigns in the club’s history. The team won the Super Division title after defeating NA Hussein Dey in the final series, winning 69–67 in the first leg and 70–59 in the second. This triumph secured the third national championship in the club’s history, following previous titles in 2007 and 2022. Coached by former international player Mohamed Yahia, Staouéli succeeded WO Boufarik as national champions.

NB Staouéli also captured the Algerian Basketball Cup, defeating defending champions USM Alger 59–46. The team relied on its experienced international quartet Chakib Sedoud, Zakaria Maatoub, Mohamed Boussad, and Mohamed Amine Bensalah to dominate the competition, having previously eliminated CRB Dar Beida, CSC Djasr Kasentina, and WO Boufarik. The final drew a record crowd at the La Coupole d'Alger Arena in Algiers, marking NB Staouéli’s fourth Algerian Cup and complementing their third national championship.

The club completed its historic domestic treble by winning the Algerian Basketball Super Cup, again defeating NA Hussein Dey 92–85 after two overtime periods, following a 71–71 tie at the end of regulation. Hichem Dekakene (26 points) and Mohamed Amine Bensalah (24 points) were the top scorers. The match was played at the Coupole of the Coupole of the Complexe sportif olympique Mohamed Boudiaf in front of a record crowd. This victory marked the third trophy of the season, completing a remarkable treble for NB Staouéli.

== Roster (Men) ==
=== Super Division roster ===
NB Staouéli roster
Players
Coaches

Pos.	No.	Nat.	Name	Ht.	Wt.	Age
PG	4	(Algeria)	Boussad, Mohamed	1.86 m (6 ft 1 in)	76 kg (168 lb)	27 – 26 November 1998
G	5	(Algeria)	Slimani, Hamoud	1.96 m (6 ft 5 in)	89 kg (196 lb)	31 – 25 December 1994
G/F	6	(Algeria)	Sedoud, Chakib	1.75 m (5 ft 9 in)	68 kg (150 lb)	22 – 15 October 2004
SF	6	(Algeria)	Tifoura, Zine-Eddine	1.65 m (5 ft 5 in)	65 kg (143 lb)	19 – 20 June 2007
PF	7	(Algeria)	Bensalah, Mohamed Amine	2.00 m (6 ft 7 in)	95 kg (209 lb)	24 – 1 January 2002
PF	8	(Algeria)	Yahya, Merouane	1.65 m (5 ft 5 in)	65 kg (143 lb)	23 – 19 March 2003
SF	9	(Algeria)	Aouizet, Louai Mohamed
SG	9	(Algeria)	Ghrib, Sid Ali	1.88 m (6 ft 2 in)	89 kg (196 lb)	41 – 1 June 1985
G	10	(Algeria)	Benrighi, Abderraouf	2.02 m (6 ft 8 in)	87 kg (192 lb)	28 – 27 November 1997
C	11	(Algeria)	Maatoub, Zakaria	2.07 m (6 ft 9 in)	105 kg (231 lb)	29 – 24 October 1997
G/F	12	(Algeria)	Aious, Sami Izedine	1.70 m (5 ft 7 in)	65 kg (143 lb)	21 – 12 October 2005
G	13	(Algeria)	Ouahab, Khaled	2.03 m (6 ft 8 in)	98 kg (216 lb)	38 – 27 July 1988
PG	14	(Algeria)	Fedala, Anis Mohamed	1.85 m (6 ft 1 in)	82 kg (181 lb)	36 – 8 January 1990
PF	15	(Algeria)	Dekakane, Hichem	1.91 m (6 ft 3 in)	96 kg (212 lb)	29 – 11 June 1997

Head coach

- (Algeria) Mohamed Yahya

Assistant coach(es)

- (Algeria) Sid Ali Ghrib

Legend

- (C) Team captain
- (I) Import player
- Injured

- Roster
Updated: April 1, 2026

== Honours ==
=== Men's ===
- Algerian Basketball Championship

Champion (3): 2006–07, 2021–22, 2024–25
Runner-up (5): 1997–98, 1998–99, 2017–18, 2018–19, 2025–26

- Algerian Basketball Cup

Champion (4): 1998–99, 1999–2000, 2006–07, 2024–25
Runner-up (4): 1972–73, 1992–93, 2007–08, 2025–26

- Algerian Basketball Super Cup

Champion (1): 2026

== In international competitions ==
BAL Qualifiers

- 2027 – In progress

== Statistics ==
=== Season by season ===
Season	Regular season						Playoffs	Algerian Cup	Super Cup	International	
Season	Division	Pos	Pts	P	W	L	Playoffs	Algerian Cup	Super Cup	International	
1999–2000	Super Division	4th	37	22	15	7		Winners			
2000–01	Super Division		0	0	0	0					
2001–02	Super Division		0	0	0	0					
2002–03	Super Division		0	0	0	0					
2003–04	Super Division		0	0	0	0					
2004–05	Super Division		0	0	0	0					
2005–06	Super Division		0	0	0	0					
2006–07	Super Division		0	0	0	0	1st	Winners			
2007–08	Super Division	3rd	43	26	17	9		Runner-up			
2008–09	Super Division	7th	13	10	3	7	Not qualify	Round of 16			
2009–10	Super Division	3rd	19	12	7	5	4th	Quarter-finals			
2010–11	Super Division	2nd	55	30	25	5	Semi-finals	Round of 16			
2011–12	Super Division	10th	43	30	13	17	—N/a	Round of 32			
2012–13	Super Division	4th	30	18	12	6	5th	Quarter-finals			
2013–14	Super Division	9th	21	18	3	15	Not qualify	Round of 16			
2014–15	Super Division	7th	34	24	10	14	8th				
2015–16	Super Division	7th	41	26	15	11		Semi-finals			
2016–17	Super Division	5th	17	11	6	5	—N/a	Semi-finals			
2017–18	National 1	2nd	47	30	17	13	Runner-up	Round of 16			
2018–19	National 1	2nd	0	0	0	0	Runner-up				
2019–20	National 1	Canceled (Note: On March 15, 2020, the Ministry of Youth and Sports decided to stop the season due to the COVID-19 pandemic in Algeria.)									
2020–21	National 1	Canceled									
2021–22	Super Division	1st 2nd	16; 17	8; 9	8; 8	0; 1	1st	Round of 16 (Note: The Algerian Basketball Federation (FABB) has decided, exceptionally, to cancel the Algerian Cup for the 2021–22 season and replace it with a Coupe fédérale which only concerns the 20 teams in the Super Division.)			
2022–23	Super Division	2nd	29	16	13	3	3rd				
2023–24	Super Division	2nd	52	30	22	8	4th	Quarter-finals			
2024–25	Super Division	1st	50	26	24	2	1st	Winners			
2025–26	Super Division	1st	46	26	20	6	Runner-up	Runner-up	Winners		
2026–27	Super Division									BAL season	3–2
