= CSC Djasr Kasentina =

- Leagues: Super Division
- Founded: 1996
- Arena: Salle omnisport de Douéra, Douéra
- Location: Djasr Kasentina, Algeria
- Team colors: Blue, White
- Head coach: Sofiane Boulahia

Club Sportif de la Commune de Djasr Kasentina (Arabic: النادي الرياضي لبلدية جسر قسنطينة لكرة السله), referred to as CSCDK for a short, is a basketball club based in Djasr Kasentina, Algeria that played in the Algerian Basketball Championship the team founded in 1996.

== History ==
The Club Sportif de la Commune de Djasr Kasentina (CSCDK) is one of Algeria’s rising sports clubs that has managed to leave a mark on the national scene despite limited resources. Founded in 1996, the club took on the mission of representing the municipality of Djasr Kasentina in competitive sports, with a special focus on basketball and youth football development. The club began its basketball journey in the lower divisions and achieved a historic promotion to the National 1 during the 2017–18 season.

This accomplishment reflected the hard work of its staff, players, and administration, despite modest financial means. With proper support and infrastructure, the club has the potential to rise even further and become one of Algeria’s prominent sports institutions. In 2023, CSCDK achieved another milestone by winning the National Second Division (Central Group) after a 55–54 victory over WA Boufarik. This win qualified them for the promotion playoffs to return to the elite level.

That same year, the club made history again by reaching the Algerian Basketball Cup Final for the first time after defeating reigning champions NB Staouéli 65–62 in the semifinals. They later faced WO Boufarik in the final match. Despite its achievements, the club faces severe financial constraints and a shortage of sports facilities most notably, the closure of the only covered sports hall for more than three years, which has negatively affected player preparation and training conditions.

== Roster (Men) ==
Note: Flags indicate national team eligibility at FIBA-sanctioned events. Players may hold other non-FIBA nationalities not displayed.

CSC Djasr Kasentina roster
Players
Coaches

Pos.	No.	Nat.	Name	Ht.	Wt.	Age
PG	1	(Algeria)	Messaoudi, Bouhaous	1.88 m (6 ft 2 in)	90 kg (198 lb)	37 – 20 September 1988
PF	4	(Algeria)	Amri, Ayoub	1.82 m (6 ft 0 in)	80 kg (176 lb)	31 – 19 December 1994
PF	5	(Algeria)	Guezout, Zakaria	1.97 m (6 ft 6 in)	87 kg (192 lb)	34 – 30 July 1992
F	7	(Algeria)	Bougria, Moussa	1.85 m (6 ft 1 in)	86 kg (190 lb)	33 – 20 January 1993
PF	9	(Algeria)	Taleb, Bilel	1.90 m (6 ft 3 in)	82 kg (181 lb)	20 – 17 June 2006
PF	11	(Algeria)	Chouchi, Rafik	1.88 m (6 ft 2 in)	65 kg (143 lb)	26 – 2 March 2000
PG	19	(Algeria)	Haichour, Ibrahim	1.90 m (6 ft 3 in)	90 kg (198 lb)	28 – 22 March 1998
SF	21	(Algeria)	Sadoudi, Ahmed	1.88 m (6 ft 2 in)	80 kg (176 lb)	34 – 29 September 1991
G	22	(Algeria)	Adrar, Lotfi (C)	1.99 m (6 ft 6 in)	99 kg (218 lb)	43 – 13 August 1983
PG	23	(Algeria)	Menacer, Yacine	1.82 m (6 ft 0 in)	78 kg (172 lb)	21 – 10 January 2005
SF	44	(Algeria)	Fellahi, Zine Eddine	1.82 m (6 ft 0 in)	77 kg (170 lb)	22 – 28 April 2004
SG	44	(Algeria)	Herbi, Abde Wahab	1.78 m (5 ft 10 in)	70 kg (154 lb)	18 – 26 December 2007
PG	75	(Algeria)	Amara, Zakaria Abdenour	1.79 m (5 ft 10 in)	75 kg (165 lb)	29 – 20 November 1996
F	25	(Algeria)	Yamame, Hezil
G	11	(Chad)	Nguere, Abraham			24 – 15 September 2002

Head coach

- (Algeria) Sofiane Boulahia

Assistant coach(es)

- (Algeria) Nassim Djabour

Legend

- (C) Team captain
- (I) Import player
- Injured

- Roster
Updated: September 13, 2025

== Statistics ==
=== Season by season ===
Season	Regular season						Playoffs	Algerian Cup	International
Season	Division	Pos	Pts	P	W	L	Playoffs	Algerian Cup	International
2017–18	National 1	15th	35	30	5	25	Not qualify	Round of 16	
2018–19	National 1								
2019–20	National 1	Canceled (Note: On March 15, 2020, the Ministry of Youth and Sports decided to stop the season due to the COVID-19 pandemic in Algeria.)							
2020–21	National 1	Canceled							
2021–22	Super Division							Round of 16 (Note: The Algerian Basketball Federation (FABB) has decided, exceptionally, to cancel the Algerian Cup for the 2021–22 season and replace it with a Coupe fédérale which only concerns the 20 teams in the Super Division.)	
2022–23	National 1						1st	Runner-up	
2023–24	Super Division	9th	44	30	14	16	Not qualify	Quarter-finals	
2024–25	Super Division	6th	41	26	15	11	5th	Quarter-finals	
2025–26	Super Division	9th	38	26	12	14	Not qualify	Round of 16	

== Honours ==
=== Men's ===
- Algerian Basketball Cup

Runner-up (1): 2022–23
