= Algerian Women's Basketball Championship =

Professional basketball championship in Algeria

National Division 1
- Founded: 1962; 64 years ago
- First season: 1962–63
- Country: Algeria
- Confederation: FIBA Africa
- Number of teams: 12
- Level on pyramid: 1
- Relegation to: W-Second Division
- Domestic cup: Algerian Cup
- International cup: FIBA Champions Cup
- Current champions: Hussein Dey Marines (2026)
- Most championships: MC Alger (15 titles)
- Website: fabbalgerie.org
- 2026–27 season

The Algerian Basketball Women's Championship, also called the National Division 1 is the pre-eminent men's basketball league in Algeria. National 1 is contested by 12 teams, with the two lowest-placed teams relegated to the Second Division.

== History ==
Basketball began before Algerian independence; there was a regional league run by the French Basketball Federation. After Algerian independence in 1962, the Algerian women's basketball championship began the same year.

== League championships by club ==
Team	Won	Years won
MC Alger	15	1998, 1999, 2009, 2010, 2011, 2012, 2013, 2014, 2015, 2016, 2017, 2018, 2019, 2022, 2023
OC Alger	9	1985, 1997, 2000, 2001, 2002, 2003, 2005, 1979, 2012
NA Hussein Dey	5	1970, 1989, 1990, 1995, 1996
AS PTT Alger	4	2004, 2006, 2007, 2008
CRM Birmandrais	3	1965, 1972, 1975
USM Alger	3	1969, 1986, 1991
ASUC EPAU El Harrach	3	1987, 1988, 1994
USM Annaba (HAMRA)	2	1966, 1967
RAMA Mouradia	2	1971, 1976
SOCA Annaba	2	1992, 1993
GS Cosider	2	2024, 2025
Club Skikda	1	1963
SEPS Oran	1	1964
CSS Sonatrach Alger	1	1968
JSF Oran	1	1974
DNC Constantine	1	1977

== See also ==
- Algerian Women's Basketball Cup
- Algerian Basketball Championship
