= Touhami Ghezzoul =

Algerian basketball player

Al-Karamah
- Position: Center
- League: Syrian Basketball League

Personal information
- Born: 5 January 1987 (age 39) Ouargla, Algeria
- Listed height: 6 ft 11 in (2.11 m)

Career information
- College: North Dakota State College of Science
- NBA draft: 2009: undrafted

Career history
- 2010–2011: Al Nasr
- 2011–2022: GS Pétroliers
- 2022–present: Al-Karamah
Medals
Men's basketball
Representing Algeria
Arab Basketball Championship
Bronze medal – third place	2022 Dubai

Touhami Ghezzoul (born 5 January 1987) is an Algerian basketball player who plays for Al-Karamah of the Syrian Basketball League. He also played for the GS Pétroliers

== Professional career ==
Ghezzoul started his career with Al Nasr. In 2011, he signed with GS Pétroliers.

On May 6, 2022, Ghezzoul signed with Al-Karamah of the Syrian Basketball League (SBL) ahead of its Final Four stage.

== Honours ==
=== Club ===
GS Pétroliers

- Super Division: 2012, 2014, 2015, 2016, 2017, 2018, 2019.
- Algerian Basketball Cup: 2012, 2013, 2014, 2015, 2016.

=== Algeria ===
- 2022 Arab Basketball Championship: (bronze) Bronze medal

== BAL career statistics ==
Legend
GP	Games played	GS	Games started	MPG	Minutes per game
FG%	Field goal percentage	3P%	3-point field goal percentage	FT%	Free throw percentage
RPG	Rebounds per game	APG	Assists per game	SPG	Steals per game
BPG	Blocks per game	PPG	Points per game	**Bold**	Career high

Year	Team	GP	GS	MPG	FG%	3P%	FT%	RPG	APG	SPG	BPG	PPG
2021	GS Pétroliers	3	2	17.2	.550	-	.500	6.3	.0	.3	.7	8.7
Career		3	2	17.2	.550	-	.500	6.3	.0	.3	.7	8.7
