= Algerian Basketball Federation =

Governing body of basketball in Algeria

- Founded: 1963; 63 years ago
- Affiliation: FIBA Africa
- Headquarters: Algiers, Algeria
- President: Mehdi Oucif

Official website
- fabb.dz

The Algerian Basketball Federation (Arabic: الاتحاديه الجزائريه لكرة السلة; FABB) is the governing body of basketball in Algeria. Formed in 1963, it is based in the capital town Algiers. The FABB is a member of the International Basketball Federation (FIBA) and also belong to the FIBA Africa zone. The current president of the federation is Mehdi Oucif.

== Competitions ==
=== Men's competitions ===
- Algerian Basketball Championship
- Algerian Basketball Championship B
- Algerian Basketball Honours
- Algerian Basketball Cup
- Algerian Basketball Super Cup

=== Women's competitions ===
- Algerian Women's Basketball Championship
- Algerian Women's Championship B
- Algerian Women's Basketball Cup
- Algerian Women's Basketball Super Cup

== See also ==
- Algeria national basketball team
- Algeria women's national basketball team
- Algeria national under-19 basketball team
- Algeria national under-17 basketball team
- Algeria women's national under-19 basketball team
- Algeria women's national under-17 basketball team
