= La Coupole d'Alger Arena =

Indoor sporting arena in Dély Ibrahim, Algeria

La Coupole
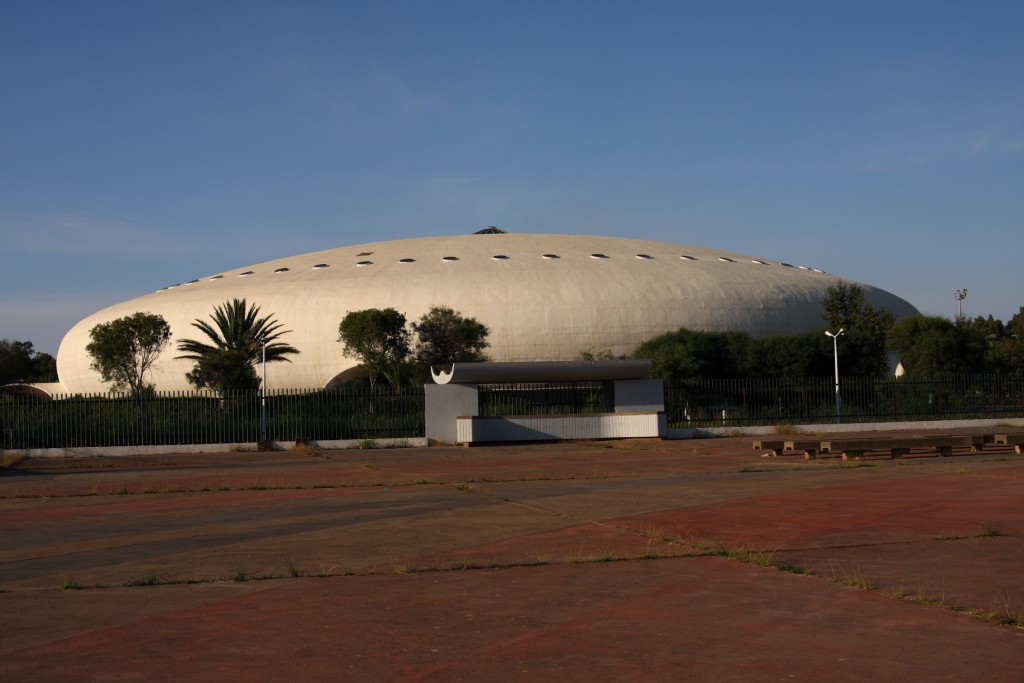
- Interactive map of La Coupole
- Full name: La Coupole du Complexe Olympique Mohamed Boudiaf
- Location: Route of the 5-July Dély Ibrahim, Algeria
- Coordinates: 36.7587°N 2.9775°E
- Owner: Ministry of Youth and Sports
- Operator: Office of the Olympic Complex Mohamed Boudiaf
- Capacity: 5,500

Construction
- Groundbreaking: 1972
- Built: 1972–75
- Opened: 17 June 1975
- Architect: Oscar Niemeyer

Tenant
- No team

La Coupole du Complexe Olympique Mohamed Boudiaf is an indoor sporting arena located in Dély Ibrahim, Algeria. The capacity of the arena is 5,500 spectators. It hosts indoor sporting events such as Handball, Basketball, Volleyball. It also hosted many international competitions and many political gatherings and concerts. The Arena was inaugurated on the occasion of the hosting of the 1975 Mediterranean Games. there are six entrances in the Arena, one of which is for the official, the Arena is of one floor in a circular way, there is also a small second floor for VIP.

== Competitions hosted ==
Some of major senior competitions are below

- Pan Arab Games
  - 2 time (2004) & (2023)
- Mediterranean Games
  - 1 time (1975)
- All-Africa Games
  - 2 times (1978 & 2007)
- African Handball Championship
  - 4 times (Men's & Women's 1976, Men's & Women's 1989, Men's & Women's 2000 & Men's & Women's 2014)
- FIBA Africa Championship
  - 2 times (Men's 1995 & Men's 2005)
- African Volleyball Championship
  - 1 time (Men's 1993)
- African Wrestling Championships
  - 1 time (2020)
- Men's Junior World Handball Championship
  - 1 time (Men's U21 2017)
- Vocotruyen World Championships
  - 1 time 2022 Vocotruyen World Championship

== See also ==
- July 5, 1962 Stadium
