= Dély Ibrahim =

Coordinates: 36°45′N 2°59′E

Dely Ibrahim
- Interactive map of Dely Ibrahim
- Country: Algeria
- Province: Algiers
- Time zone: UTC+1 (West Africa Time)

Dély Ibrahim is a suburb of the city of Algiers in northern Algeria. Here is located Serbian Military cemetery, created between 1916 and 1919. At the time in several coastal towns and villages in Algeria were more French military hospitals where the wounded and exhausted Serbian soldiers were treated. Those soldiers were from the island of Corfu and Vido transported for further treatment in the Allied military hospital in North Africa.

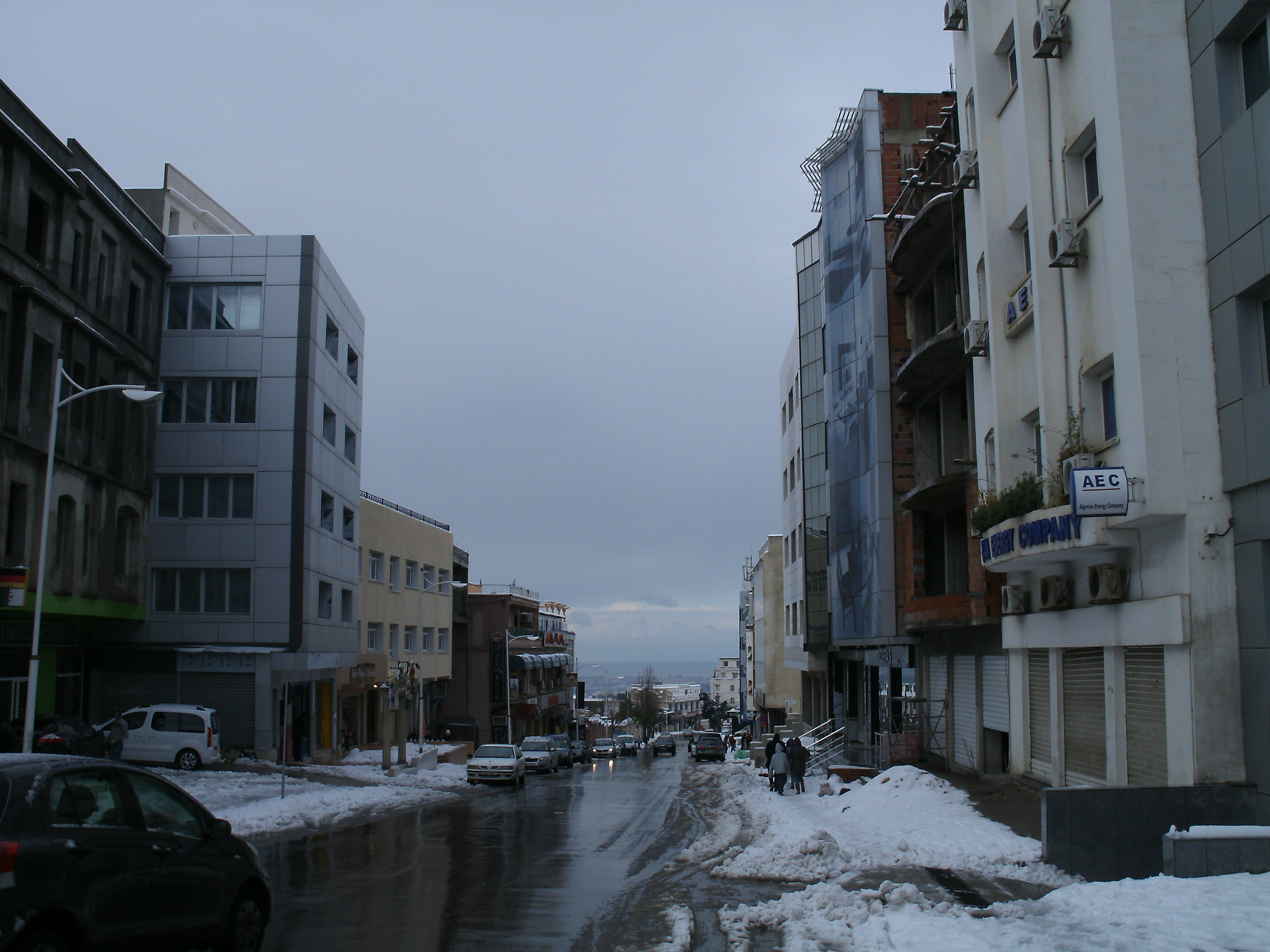
Dély Ibrahim

== Population ==
The population of Dély Ibrahim, Algiers, Algeria, was approximately 55,000 inhabitants.

== Culture ==
Berber languages are well spoken by the inhabitants of deli brahim. Algerian cuisine is rich and diverse, and you can find many traditional dishes in Dély Ibrahim. Common ingredients include couscous, lamb, beef, chicken, and various vegetables. Some popular dishes are couscous, tagines, and brik. Algerians in Dély Ibrahim celebrate several cultural and religious festivals throughout the year, such as Yennayer, Eid al-Fitr, Eid al-Adha and the Algerian Independence Day.

== Religion ==
The predominant religion in Dély Ibrahim is Islam. Algeria is a predominantly Muslim country, and the majority of its population adheres to the Sunni branch of Islam. Muslims in Dély Ibrahim, as in the rest of Algeria, practice their religious beliefs, observe Islamic traditions, and participate in religious events. Mosques are essential places of worship in Dély Ibrahim, and you can find them throughout the municipality to accommodate the religious needs of the local Muslim population. Muslims in Dély Ibrahim, like in many other places, observe the five daily prayers and fast during the holy month of Ramadan.

== See also ==
in daly brahim you can find Concentrix algeria QG

- University of Algiers 3
