= 2024–25 USM Alger basketball season =

USM Alger
2024–25 season
- President: (Algeria) Saïd Allik (until 18 September 2024) (Algeria) Fouad Djabrouni (from 18 September 2024)
- Head coach: (Algeria) Réda El Hachemi (until 5 December 2024) (Algeria) Ali Benhocine (from 7 December 2024) (until 12 February 2025) (Algeria) Hafid Senour (c) (from 13 February 2025) (until 28 February 2025) (Algeria) Achour Sekhi (from 29 February 2025)
- Arena: Salle OMS Mourad Boukechoura, Raïs Hamidou
- Super Division: 9th
- Algerian Cup: Runner-up
- Super Cup: Runners–up
- Biggest win: USM Alger 92–53 Olympique Batna (January 14, 2025)
- Biggest defeat: USM Alger 61–79 WO Boufarik (December 13, 2024)

The 2024–25 season was USM Alger's 63rd in existence, their 6th consecutive season in the top flight of the Algerian basketball, USM Alger are participating in this season's editions of the Algerian Cup and the Super Cup.

== Overview ==
After the withdrawal of Saïd Allik who decided not to run for a new term, Allik has expressed his desire to pass the torch, providing an opportunity for new faces to take the reins of the club, on September 18, 2024, Djabrouni Fouad a member of the Judo Section, was elected as the new president of the CSA/USMA. Djabrouni received 16 votes out of 24 voters, while the other candidate, Khebaz Hamid the treasurer received only 7 votes. The first phase of the Super Division played in a two-legged format, 26 rounds in total. At the end of this phase, the top eight teams in the standings will play the Play-offs, while the remaining six teams will play the Play-downs. The FABB also announced the renewal of the decision prohibiting foreign players from playing in the Super Division, the FABB which set the deadline for submitting the commitment file to September 30.

The first match of the new season was against CSC Gué de Constantine at home. USM Alger was behind in the first three quarters, and in the fourth and final quarter, USMA reduced the score to one point, which was not enough to receive its first defeat. On December 3, 2024, WO Boufarik star Lamouri Merahi joined USM Alger. On December 5, 2024, after leading USM Alger to return to the podium with two league and cup titles, coach Réda El Hachemi left for rival club MC Alger. On January 31, 2024, the Algerian Basketball Federation (FABB), announced the scheduling of the Basketball Super Cup match on February 11, 2025, at La Coupole d'Alger Arena between WO Boufarik, the Super Division champion, and USM Alger, the Algerian Cup champion. WO Boufarik beat USM Alger with a score of 70–59.

In Round 20, USM Alger traveled to Staoueli to face the Super Division leaders NB Staouéli in a crucial basketball game. USM Alger a team accustomed to playing a leading role in the championship, aimed for a victory to boost their chances of reaching the Playoffs. Coach Achour Sekhi's men dominated the first and second quarters and headed to the locker rooms with a three-point lead (31–34). In the second half, during the third quarter, USM Alger's performance declined, and they ended the quarter trailing by 11 points (54–43). In the fourth quarter, Coach Sekhi increased the pace of his players’ game, and despite their efforts, the match ended in a narrow defeat with a three-point gap (66–63).

USM Alger, the defending Algerian Cup champions, fell short in their bid to retain the trophy, losing 59–46 to newly crowned 2025 Algerian champions, NB Staouéli in the final of the 54th edition of the Algerian Cup. Despite the defeat, the USMA side, which carries a legacy in Algerian basketball with four Super Division titles (1966, 1967, 1969, 2023) and the 2024 Algerian Cup crown, showed encouraging signs for the future.

Fielding a rejuvenated squad under the club’s rebuilding phase, USMA relied on several emerging prospects, including 2.16m (7'1") center Faredj Messaoudi (22 years old), who led the team’s efforts on the court. The match, played at the Coupole of the Mohamed Boudiaf Olympic Complex, drew a record crowd, with the USMA supporters backing their young squad throughout the contest. Staouéli’s experience ultimately proved decisive in the second half.

== Players ==
=== Super Division roster ===
Note: Flags indicate national team eligibility at FIBA-sanctioned events. Players may hold other non-FIBA nationalities not displayed.

USM Alger roster
Players
Coaches

Pos.	No.	Nat.	Name	Ht.	Wt.	Age
C	0	(Algeria)	Saidi, Nabil	2.00 m (6 ft 7 in)		44 – 13 March 1980
SF	1	(Algeria)	Belhadj, Ramadane	1.70 m (5 ft 7 in)		29 – 5 April 1995
PF	2	(Algeria)	Merahi, Lamouri	1.95 m (6 ft 5 in)		29 – 6 October 1995
PG	4	(Algeria)	Khoudja, Zakaria	1.82 m (6 ft 0 in)		19 – 10 May 2005
PF	7	(Algeria)	Lakeb, Riadh	1.93 m (6 ft 4 in)		18 – 27 March 2006
PF	9	(Algeria)	Bougria, Moussa	1.85 m (6 ft 1 in)		31 – 20 January 1993
PG	10	(Algeria)	Messaoudi, Bouhaous (C)	1.88 m (6 ft 2 in)		36 – 20 September 1988
PF	11	(Algeria)	Redouane, Tarek	2.00 m (6 ft 7 in)		31 – 11 April 1993
PF	19	(Algeria)	Chaid, Badreddine	1.87 m (6 ft 2 in)		21 – 17 April 2003
SG	21	(Algeria)	Medjoubi, Bacim	1.88 m (6 ft 2 in)		23 – 20 October 2001
G	24	(Algeria)	Amairia, Mohamed	2.01 m (6 ft 7 in)		38 – 9 May 1986
C	26	(Algeria)	Messaoudi, Faredj	2.15 m (7 ft 1 in)		21 – 20 January 2003
PG	29	(Algeria)	Sadouki, Abdelmounaim
G	55	(Algeria)	Iggui, Samy Abderachid
SG	77	(Algeria)	Boutiba, Ahmed	1.94 m (6 ft 4 in)		28 – 22 December 1995

Head coach

- (Algeria) Achour Sekhi

Assistant coach(es)

- (Algeria) Sofiane Boukelmoune
- (Algeria) Khaled Berkane

Legend

- (C) Team captain
- (I) Import player
- Injured

- Roster
Updated: June 17, 2025

=== Transactions ===
==== In ====
No.	Pos.	Nat.	Name	Age	Moving from		Type	Ends	Transfer fee	Date	Source
2	SG	(Algeria)	Lamouri Merahi	31	WO Boufarik	(Algeria)	Transfer	June 2025	Free	3 December 2024	
77	G	(Algeria)	Ahmed Boutiba	30	MC Alger	(Algeria)	Transfer	June 2025	Free	20 December 2024	
26	C	(Algeria)	Faredj Messaoudi	23	Shonan Sesaside	(Japan)	Transfer	June 2025	Free		
24	F/C	(Algeria)	Mohamed Amairia		WO Boufarik	(Algeria)	Transfer	June 2025	Free		

== Competitions ==
=== Overview ===
Competition	First match	Last match	Starting round	Final position	Record							
Competition	First match	Last match	Starting round	Final position	Pld	W	D	L	PF	PA	PD	Win %
Super Division	9 November 2024	6 May 2025	Round 1	9th	26	13		13	1,650	1,590	+60	50.00
Super Division Playdown	24 May 2025	31 May 2025	First Playdown	1st	5	4		1	368	303	+65	80.00
Algerian Cup	15 April 2025	17 June 2025	Round of 16	Runner-up	4	3		1	265	239	+26	75.00
Algerian Super Cup	11 February 2025	11 February 2025	Final	Runners–up	1	0		1	59	70	−11	0.00
Total					36	20	0	16	2,342	2,202	+140	55.56

Last updated: June 17, 2025
Source: Competitions

=== Super Division ===
==== League table ====
Pos	Team	Pld	W	L	GF	GA	GD	Pts	
7	CS Tlemcen	26	14	12	1668	1636	+32	40	Advance to playoffs
8	USM Blida	26	13	13	1800	1825	−25	39	Advance to playoffs
9	USM Alger	26	13	13	1650	1590	+60	38 (Note: USM Alger were deducted 1 points.)	Advance to Play down
10	Rouiba CB	26	11	15	1662	1680	−18	37	Advance to Play down
11	TRA Draria	26	10	16	1628	1674	−46	36	Advance to Play down

First match(es) will be played: May 6, 2025. Source: FABB

==== Results summary ====
Overall						Home					Away				
Pld	W	L	PF	PA	PD	W	L	PF	PA	PD	W	L	PF	PA	PD
26	13	13	1650	1590	+60	9	4	897	820	+77	4	9	753	770	−17

Last updated: May 6, 2025.
Source: Competitive matches

==== Results by round ====
Round	1	2	3	4	5	6	7	8	9	10	11	12	13	14	15	16	17	18	19	20	21	22	23	24	25	26
Ground	H	A	H	A	H	A	H	A	H	H	A	H	A	A	H	A	H	A	H	A	H	A	A	H	A	H
Result	L	L	W	L	L	L	W	L	W	W	W	W	W	L	L	W	W	L	W	L	W	W	L	W	L	L
Position	8	10	7		10	14	13	13	13	11	11	10	9	10	10	10	9	9	9	10	9	9	9	9	9	9

Source: Competitive matches
A = Away; H = Home; W = Win; L = Loss; R = Rest

==== Matches ====
All times are local, WAT (UTC+1).

November 9, 2024 1	USM Alger	51–52	CSC Djasr Kasentina	Raïs Hamidou
17:00	Scoring by quarter: 10–15, 15–16, 13–14, 13–7
		Boxscore		Arena: Salle OMS Mourad Boukechoura; Referees: Ferhani, Rahali

November 15, 2024 2	CR Beni Saf	55–54	USM Alger	Béni Saf
15:00	Scoring by quarter: –, –, –, –
		[ Boxscore]		Arena: Salle OMS Yousfi Said; Referees: Emtir, Houmita

November 23, 2024 3	USM Alger	62–42	M Ouled Chebel	Raïs Hamidou
15:00	Scoring by quarter: 14–11, 18–16, 17–9, 13–6
		Boxscore		Arena: Salle OMS Mourad Boukechoura; Referees: Ghaib, Heddi

December 6, 2024 4	CS Tlemcen	52–50	USM Alger	Tlemcen
15:00	Scoring by quarter: –, –, –, –
		[ Boxscore]		Arena: Salle OMS Kara Zaitri Imama

December 13, 2024 5	USM Alger	61–79	WO Boufarik	Raïs Hamidou
16:00	Scoring by quarter: 19–16, 22–22, 5–22, 15–19
		Boxscore		Arena: Salle OMS Mourad Boukechoura; Referees: Bennani, Fouchene

December 27, 2024 6	TRA Draria	20–00	USM Alger	Ouled Fayet
16:00
		[ Boxscore]		Arena: Salle OMS Ghazali Salem; Referees: Kahallou, Ghaib, Rahali

January 4, 2025 7	USM Alger	71–62	NB Staouéli	Hydra
17:00	Scoring by quarter: 26–17, 19–18, 13–12, 13–15
		Boxscore		Arena: Salle OMS Abdelaziz Ben Tifour; Referees: Kaddour, Berrah, Hammada

January 10, 2025 8	MC Alger	70–62	USM Alger	Hydra
17:00	Scoring by quarter: 12–10, 13–16, 23–14, 22–22
		Boxscore		Arena: Salle OMS Abdelaziz Ben Tifour; Referees: Kahallou, Amrane, Kahil

January 14, 2025 9	USM Alger	92–53	Olympique Batna	Raïs Hamidou
15:00	Scoring by quarter: –, –, –, –
		[ Boxscore]		Arena: Salle OMS Mourad Boukechoura; Referees: Amrane, Laoubi, Loutis

January 17, 2025 10	USM Alger	64–61	NA Hussein Dey	Dar El Beïda
17:00	Scoring by quarter: 9–15, 18–15, 17–15, 20–16
		Boxscore		Arena: Salle OMS Dar El Beïda; Referees: Bennani, Kahil, Rahali

January 21, 2025 11	OS Bordj Bou Arreridj	63–67(OT)	USM Alger	Bordj Bou Arréridj
15:00	Scoring by quarter: 16–12, 14–15, 14–15, 13–15, Overtime: 6–10
		Boxscore		Arena: Salle OMS du 18 Février; Referees: Larouci, Hammada, Madjoudj

January 25, 2025 12	USM Alger	76–61	USM Blida	Raïs Hamidou
16:00	Scoring by quarter: 31–24, 9–15, 24–8, 12–14
		Boxscore		Arena: Salle OMS Mourad Boukechoura; Referees: Kahalou, Ghaib, Rahali

February 1, 2025 13	Rouiba CB	59–65	USM Alger	Rouïba
17:00	Scoring by quarter: 6–12, 11–18, 22–24, 20–11
		Boxscore		Arena: Salle OMS Mohamed Kadiri; Referees: Kahallou, Osmane, Heddi
Note: USM Alger Lineups: Saidi, Belhadj, Khoudja, Amairia, Bougria, Boutiba, Redouane (c), Merahi, Medjoubi, Lakeb, Chaid, Iggui - Coach: Ali Benhocine, Assistant: Djamel Eddine Amri & Hafid Senour.

February 15, 2025 14	CSC Djasr Kasentina	60–59(OT)	USM Alger	Douéra
16:00	Scoring by quarter: 12–11, 9–15, 19–12, 12–14, Overtime: 8–7
		Boxscore		Arena: Salle omnisport de Douéra; Referees: Larouci, Bennani, Laoubi
Note: USM Alger Lineups: Saidi, Belhadj, Merahi, Khoudja, Lakeb, Bougria, Messaoudi.B, Redouane (c), Medjoubi, Amairia, Sadouki, Boutiba - Coach: Hafid Senour, Assistant: Djamel Eddine Amri.

February 28, 2025 15	USM Alger	72–75	CR Beni Saf	Raïs Hamidou
15:00	Scoring by quarter: 13–16, 22–20, 24–21, 13–18
		Boxscore		Arena: Salle OMS Mourad Boukechoura; Referees: Bennani, Latibi, Heddi
Note: USM Alger Lineups: Saidi, Belhadj, Merahi, Khoudja, Lakeb, Bougria, Messaoudi.B (c), Redouane, Medjoubi, Amairia, Boutiba, Iggui - Coach: Hafid Senour.

March 7, 2025 16	M Ouled Chebel	60–66	USM Alger	Ouled Chebel
22:30	Scoring by quarter: 13–18, 15–19, 18–11, 14–18
		Boxscore		Arena: Salle OMS Boualem Bouhedja; Referees: Si Youcef, Larouci, Bennani
Note: USM Alger Lineups: Saidi (c), Belhadj, Merahi, Khoudja, Lakeb, Bougria, Messaoudi.B, Redouane, Medjoubi, Amairia, Boutiba, Iggui - Coach: Achour Sekhi, Assistant: Sofiane Boukelmoune.

March 14, 2025 17	USM Alger	71–59	CS Tlemcen	Raïs Hamidou
22:30	Scoring by quarter: 12–15, 17–15, 26–11, 16–18
		Boxscore		Arena: Salle OMS Mourad Boukechoura; Referees: Larouci, Heddi, Fouchene
Note: USM Alger Lineups: Saidi (c), Belhadj, Merahi, Khoudja, Lakeb, Bougria, Messaoudi.B, Redouane, Medjoubi, Amairia, Boutiba, Iggui - Coach: Achour Sekhi, Assistant: Sofiane Boukelmoune.

March 20, 2025 18	WO Boufarik	74–72	USM Alger	Boufarik
22:30	Scoring by quarter: 16–17, 29–23, 16–19, 13–13
		Boxscore		Arena: Salle Moussa Cheraf; Referees: Mokhtari, Zitouni, Benhamou
Note: USM Alger Lineups: Saidi, Belhadj, Merahi, Khoudja, Lakeb, Bougria, Messaoudi.B, Redouane (c), Medjoubi, Amairia, Boutiba, Iggui - Coach: Achour Sekhi, Assistant: Sofiane Boukelmoune.

March 28, 2025 19	USM Alger	63–58	TRA Draria	Raïs Hamidou
22:30	Scoring by quarter: 20–17, 20–20, 8–20, 15–1
		Boxscore		Arena: Salle OMS Mourad Boukechoura
Note: USM Alger Lineups: Saidi (c), Belhadj, Merahi, Khoudja, Lakeb, Bougria, Messaoudi.B, Medjoubi, Amairia, Messaoudi.F, Boutiba, Iggui - Coach: Achour Sekhi, Assistant: Sofiane Boukelmoune.

April 4, 2025 20	NB Staouéli	66–63	USM Alger	Staoueli
17:00	Scoring by quarter: 13–14, 18–20, 23–9, 12–20
				Arena: Salle OMS de Staouéli; Referees: Si Youcef, Bennani, Kahil
Note: USM Alger Lineups: Saidi, Belhadj, Merahi, Khoudja, Lakeb, Bougria, Messaoudi.B, Redouane (c), Medjoubi, Amairia, Messaoudi.F, Boutiba - Coach: Achour Sekhi, Assistant: Sofiane Boukelmoune.

April 11, 2025 21	USM Alger	71–68	MC Alger	Raïs Hamidou
18:00	Scoring by quarter: –, –, –, –
	Pts: Billel Bougria 11			Arena: Salle OMS Mourad Boukechoura; Referees: Si Youcef, Larouci, Bennani
Note: USM Alger Lineups: Saidi, Belhadj, Merahi, Khoudja, Lakeb, Bougria, Messaoudi.B, Redouane (c), Medjoubi, Amairia, Messaoudi.F, Boutiba - Coach: Achour Sekhi, Assistant: Sofiane Boukelmoune.

April 19, 2025 22	Olympique Batna	53–77	USM Alger	Batna
15:00	Scoring by quarter: –, –, –, –
			Pts: Zakaria Khoudja 16	Arena: Salle OMS 1er Novembre 1954; Referees: Hamada, Latibi, Aimeur
Note: USM Alger Lineups: Saidi, Belhadj, Merahi, Khoudan, Lakeb, Bougria, Messaoudi.B, Redouane (c), Chaid, Medjoubi, Messaoudi.F, Boutiba - Coach: Achour Sekhi, Assistant: Sofiane Boukelmoune.

April 22, 2025 23	NA Hussein Dey	69–52	USM Alger	Algiers
18:30	Scoring by quarter: –, –, –, –
				Arena: Salle Mohamed Handjer; Attendance: 0 (close doors); Referees: Larouci, Hamada, Latibi
Note: USM Alger Lineups: Saidi, Belhadj, Merahi, Khoudja, Bougria, Messaoudi.B, Redouane (c), Chaid, Medjoubi, Amairia, Messaoudi.F, Boutiba - Coach: Achour Sekhi, Assistant: Sofiane Boukelmoune.

April 25, 2025 24	USM Alger	79–63	OS Bordj Bou Arreridj	Raïs Hamidou
15:00	Scoring by quarter: 20–19, 24–12, 18–16, 17–16
	Pts: Lamouri Merahi 17	Boxscore		Arena: Salle OMS Mourad Boukechoura; Referees: Amrane, Kahil, Heddi
Note: USM Alger Lineups: Saidi, Belhadj, Merahi, Khoudja, Lakeb, Bougria, Messaoudi.B, Redouane (c), Chaid, Medjoubi, Amairia, Messaoudi.F - Coach: Achour Sekhi, Assistant: Sofiane Boukelmoune.

May 2, 2025 25	USM Blida	69–66	USM Alger	Blida
17:00	Scoring by quarter: 28–13, 17–16, 21–21, 3–16
		[ Boxscore]		Arena: Salle Hocine Chalane; Attendance: 0 (close doors); Referees: Si Youcef, Hamada, Bennani
Note: USM Alger Lineups: Saidi, Belhadj, Merahi, Khoudja, Bougria, Messaoudi.B, Messaoudi.F, Redouane (c), Chaid, Medjoubi, Amairia, Boutiba - Coach: Achour Sekhi, Assistant: Sofiane Boukelmoune.

May 6, 2025 26	USM Alger	64–87	Rouiba CB	Raïs Hamidou
15:00	Scoring by quarter: 9–29, 16–25, 18–15, 21–18
		Boxscore		Arena: Salle OMS Mourad Boukechoura; Referees: Kaddour, Amrane, Benmendil
Note: USM Alger Lineups: Saidi, Belhadj, Merahi, Khoudja, Bougria, Messaoudi.B, Messaoudi.F, Redouane (c), Chaid, Medjoubi, Amairia, Boutiba - Coach: Achour Sekhi, Assistant: Sofiane Boukelmoune.

=== Playdown ===
Playdowns table
Pos	Team	Pld	W	L	GF	GA	GD	Pts	
1	USM Alger	5	4	1	368	303	+65	9	
2	M Ouled Chebel	5	3	2	336	361	−25	8	
3	Rouiba CB	5	3	2	370	335	+35	8	
4	TRA Draria	5	3	2	357	355	+2	8	
5	OS Bordj Bou Arreridj	5	2	3	329	332	−3	7	Relegation to National 1
6	Olympique Batna	5	0	5	306	380	−74	5	Relegation to National 1

First match(es) will be played: May 31, 2025. Source: FABB

==== 1st playdown ====
May 24, 2025 Round 1	USM Alger	76–48	OS Bordj Bou Arreridj	Rouïba
20:00	Scoring by quarter: 23–10, 17–13, 20–8, 16–17
	Pts: Faredj Messaoudi 17; Rebs: Bouhaous Messaoudi 13; Asts: Bouhaous Messaoudi 7	Boxscore	Pts: Mehdi Aliane 11; Rebs: Anis Azzouz 11; Asts: Mehdi Aliane 6	Arena: Salle OMS Mohamed Kadiri; Referees: Adlen Larouci, Mohamed Marouf, M'hamed Berrah

May 25, 2025 Round 2	M Ouled Chebel	63–73	USM Alger	Rouïba
20:00	Scoring by quarter: 20–21, 14–23, 14–14, 15–15
	Pts: Ahmed Allali 14; Rebs: Ahmed Allali 11; Asts: Three players 3	Boxscore	Pts: Redouane, Belhadj 15; Rebs: Bouhaous Messaoudi 12; Asts: Zakaria Khoudja 5	Arena: Salle OMS Mohamed Kadiri; Referees: Adlen Larouci, Anis Bennani, Yacine Kahil

==== 2nd playdown ====
May 29, 2025 Round 3	USM Alger	73–58	Olympique Batna	Hydra
20:00	Scoring by quarter: 18–18, 20–7, 22–15, 13–18
	Pts: Lamouri Merahi 16; Rebs: Lamouri Merahi 10; Asts: Ramadane Belhadj 5	Boxscore	Pts: Oussama Koulib 17; Rebs: Houssam Bouallag 8 Asts: Okba Mafoune 7	Arena: Salle OMS Abdelaziz Ben Tifour; Referees: Hamid Kaddour, M'hamed Berrah, Imene Tahm

May 30, 2025 Round 4	USM Alger	78–61	Rouiba CB	Hydra
20:00	Scoring by quarter: 16–16, 16–9, 21–14, 25–22
	Pts: Nabil Saidi 21; Rebs: Bouhaous Messaoudi 18; Asts: Moussa Bougria 9	Boxscore	Pts: Ziad Chenieff 24; Rebs: Abdelhakim Abaz 7 Asts: Ziad Chenieff 5	Arena: Salle OMS Abdelaziz Ben Tifour; Referees: Hamid Kaddour, M'hamed Berrah, Sofiane Hammada

May 31, 2025 Round 5	TRA Draria	73–68	USM Alger	Hydra
19:00	Scoring by quarter: 14–15, 15–16, 19–23, 25–14
		[ Boxscore]		Arena: Salle OMS Abdelaziz Ben Tifour

=== Algerian Cup ===
April 29, 2025 Round of 16	USM Alger	74–63	NA Hussein Dey	Raïs Hamidou
19:00	Scoring by quarter: 21–15, 21–14, 19–20, 13–14
		Boxscore		Arena: Salle OMS Mourad Boukechoura; Referees: Si Youcef, Hamada, Fouchene
Note: USM Alger Lineups: Saidi, Belhadj, Merahi, Khoudja, Bougria, Messaoudi.B, Messaoudi.F, Redouane (c), Lakeb, Medjoubi, Amairia, Boutiba - Coach: Achour Sekhi, Assistant: Sofiane Boukelmoune.

May 10, 2025 Quarter-finals	USM Alger	66–47	M Ouled Chebel	Staoueli
15:00	Scoring by quarter: 11–15, 21–4, 11–15, 23–13
		Boxscore		Arena: Salle de Staouéli; Referees: Ghaib, Fouchene, Kahil
Note: USM Alger Lineups: Saidi, Belhadj, Merahi, Khodja, Lakeb, Bougria, Messaoudi.B, Messaoudi.F, Redouane (c), Chaid, Medjoubi, Amairia - Coach: Achour Sekhi, Assistant: Sofiane Boukelmoune.

June 4, 2025 Semi-finals	USM Alger	79–73	TRA Draria	Dély Ibrahim, Algiers
16:00	Scoring by quarter: 22–20, 21–20, 19–15, 17–18
	Pts: Tarek Redouane 26; Rebs: Lamouri Merahi 9 Asts: Three players 6	Boxscore	Pts: Nouari, Hamdini 14; Rebs: Abdellah Hamdini 10; Asts: Four players 2	Arena: La Coupole d'Alger Arena; Referees: Adlen Larouci, M'hamed Berrah, Hamid Kaddour

June 17, 2025 Final	USM Alger	46–59	NB Staouéli	Dély Ibrahim, Algiers
16:00	Scoring by quarter: 14–9, 17–18, 7–23, 8–9
TV6	Pts: Merahi, Saidi 9 Rebs: F.Messaoudi 9 Asts: B.Messaoudi 5	Boxscore	Pts: Fedala 15; Rebs: Bensalah 9 Asts: Fedala 4	Arena: La Coupole d'Alger Arena; Referees: Sofiane Si Youcef, Adlen Larouci, Anis Bennani

=== Super Cup ===
February 11, 2025 Final	WO Boufarik	70–59	USM Alger	Algiers
17:00	Scoring by quarter: 27–15, 13–16, 12–13, 18–15
TV2, TV6	Pts: Kadour Métidji 13; Rebs: Rabah Zitoun 8 Asts: Fayçal Zerouk Belkhodja 7	Boxscore	Pts: Lamouri Merahi 13; Rebs: Ahmed Boutiba 8 Asts: Moussa Bougria 4	Arena: La Coupole d'Alger Arena; Attendance: 2,500; Referees: Si Youcef Sofiane, Kaddour Hamid, Hamada Sofiane

Starters:			Pts	Reb	Ast
SG	1	(Algeria) Tarek Hamdani	5	5	3
SG	23	(Algeria) Kadour Métidji	13	1	1
SF	32	(Algeria) Djamel Achache	11	7	2
C	44	(Algeria) Rabah Zitoun	12	8	0
PF	99	(Algeria) Mohamed Akram Sahraoui	10	3	2
Reserves:					
SG	8	(Algeria) Adel Bachouche	DNP		
C	10	(Algeria) Mohamed Seddik Touati	12	6	0
PG	11	(Algeria) Abdelhak Henna	0	0	2
SF	12	(Algeria) Zakaria Foughali	DNP		
PF	14	(Algeria) Louai Chebel	0	5	0
SG	15	(Algeria) Redouane Mimouni	7	3	2
SG	21	(Algeria) Fayçal Zerouk Belkhodja	0	4	7
Head coach:
(Algerian Basketball Federation) Sofiane Boulahia

WO Boufarik	USM Alger

WO Boufarik	Statistics	USM Alger
19/38 (50.0%)	2-pt field goals	19/49 (38.8%)
5/19 (26.3%)	3-pt field goals	2/28 (7.1%)
17/29 (58.6%)	Free throws	15/19 (78.9%)
12	Offensive rebounds	18
38	Defensive rebounds	27
50	Total rebounds	45
19	Assists	17
21	Turnovers	14
	Steals	
3	Blocks	2
34	Fouls	36

Starters:			Pts	Reb	Ast
C	0	(Algeria) Nabil Saidi	12	6	3
PF	2	(Algeria) Lamouri Merahi	13	4	2
PG	10	(Algeria) Bouhaous Messaoudi	8	6	3
F/C	24	(Algeria) Mohamed Amairia	11	7	1
G	77	(Algeria) Ahmed Boutiba	7	8	2
Reserves:					
SF	1	(Algeria) Ramadane Belhadj	3	4	2
PG	4	(Algeria) Zakaria Khoudja	DNP		
PF	7	(Algeria) Riadh Lakeb	DNP		
PF	9	(Algeria) Moussa Bougria	3	2	4
PF	11	(Algeria) Tarek Redouane	DNP		
SG	21	(Algeria) Bacim Medjoubi	0	0	0
C	26	(Algeria) Faredj Messaoudi	2	2	0
Head coach:
(Algerian Basketball Federation) Ali Benhocine
