= 2026 Algerian Basketball Super Division finals =

- Match programme cover
| NB Staouéli | WO Boufarik |
|---|---|
| 1 | 2 |
| Head coach: Mohamed Yahya | Head coach: Reda Hachemi |
- Date: June 4–6, 2026
- Venue: La Coupole d'Alger Arena, Algiers
- MVP: Tarek Hamdani
- Referees: Si Youcef Sofiane, Hammada Sofia, Latibi Wahid, Bennani Anis, Hammada Sofiane
- Attendance: 2,167

2026 Algerian Basketball Super Division Finals is a final between the two top Algerian basketball teams. The Superdivision playoff semi-finals delivered two tight and exciting matchups, with NB Staouéli and WO Boufarik advancing to the final. NB Staouéli secured a narrow 60–57 win over USM Alger in a defensive battle, showing composure in the final moments. WO Boufarik, on the other hand, confirmed their dominance with a solid 80–73 away victory against CS Tlemcen, controlling the game despite a late comeback attempt.

The Super Division play-off final pitted NB Staouéli, the defending champions, against WO Boufarik from June 4 to 6, 2026, at the Coupole of the Coupole of the Mohamed Boudiaf Olympic Complex in Algiers. Played as a best-of-three series, the final was a closely contested battle between two of the country's top teams. NB Staouéli, the regular-season leaders and champions in 2007, 2022, and 2025, aimed to secure another national title despite their recent defeat to MC Alger in the Algerian Cup final. Meanwhile, WO Boufarik, one of Algeria’s most successful basketball clubs with ten league titles, sought to claim an eleventh championship and return to the top after winning their last title in 2024.

The WO Boufarik won the 2026 Super Division after defeating NB Staouéli 70–66 in the decisive third game of the finals. The final series, played in a best-of-three format, was tightly contested (2–1 overall). Staouéli started strongly and edged the first quarter, but Boufarik responded before halftime to lead 37–35. The turning point came in the third quarter, where Boufarik dominated 27–19 to build a crucial lead.

Despite a late comeback attempt by NB Staouéli, who won the final quarter 12–6, Boufarik held firm defensively and managed the closing minutes to secure the victory. Hichem Dekakene was the top scorer of the match with 22 points for Staouéli, while Kadour Mitidji and Tarek Hamdani led Boufarik with 13 points each. With this win, WO Boufarik claimed its 11th national title, succeeding NB Staouéli as champions of Algeria.

== Overviews ==
=== NB Staouéli roster ===
NB Staouéli roster
Players
Coaches

| Pos. | No. | Nat. | Name | Ht. | Wt. | Age |
|---|---|---|---|---|---|---|
| PG | 4 | (Algeria) | Boussad, Mohamed | 1.86 m (6 ft 1 in) | 76 kg (168 lb) | 27 – 26 November 1998 |
| G | 5 | (Algeria) | Slimani, Hamoud | 1.96 m (6 ft 5 in) | 89 kg (196 lb) | 31 – 25 December 1994 |
| G/F | 6 | (Algeria) | Sedoud, Chakib | 1.75 m (5 ft 9 in) | 68 kg (150 lb) | 21 – 15 October 2004 |
| SF | 6 | (Algeria) | Tifoura, Zine-Eddine | 1.65 m (5 ft 5 in) | 65 kg (143 lb) | 19 – 20 June 2007 |
| PF | 7 | (Algeria) | Bensalah, Mohamed Amine | 2.00 m (6 ft 7 in) | 95 kg (209 lb) | 24 – 1 January 2002 |
| PF | 8 | (Algeria) | Yahya, Merouane | 1.65 m (5 ft 5 in) | 65 kg (143 lb) | 23 – 19 March 2003 |
| SF | 9 | (Algeria) | Aouizet, Louai Mohamed |
| SG | 9 | (Algeria) | Ghrib, Sid Ali | 1.88 m (6 ft 2 in) | 89 kg (196 lb) | 41 – 1 June 1985 |
| G | 10 | (Algeria) | Benrighi, Abderraouf | 2.02 m (6 ft 8 in) | 87 kg (192 lb) | 28 – 27 November 1997 |
| C | 11 | (Algeria) | Maatoub, Zakaria | 2.07 m (6 ft 9 in) | 105 kg (231 lb) | 28 – 24 October 1997 |
| G/F | 12 | (Algeria) | Aious, Sami Izedine | 1.70 m (5 ft 7 in) | 65 kg (143 lb) | 20 – 12 October 2005 |
| G | 13 | (Algeria) | Ouahab, Khaled | 2.03 m (6 ft 8 in) | 98 kg (216 lb) | 38 – 27 July 1988 |
| PG | 14 | (Algeria) | Fedala, Anis Mohamed | 1.85 m (6 ft 1 in) | 82 kg (181 lb) | 36 – 8 January 1990 |
| PF | 15 | (Algeria) | Dekakane, Hichem | 1.91 m (6 ft 3 in) | 96 kg (212 lb) | 29 – 11 June 1997 |

Head coach

- (Algeria) Mohamed Yahya

Assistant coach(es)

- (Algeria) Sid Ali Ghrib

Legend

- (C) Team captain
- (I) Import player
- Injured

- Roster
Updated: April 1, 2026

=== WO Boufarik roster ===
WO Boufarik roster
Players
Coaches

| Pos. | No. | Nat. | Name | Ht. | Wt. | Age |
|---|---|---|---|---|---|---|
| PG | 1 | (Algeria) | Hamdani, Tarek | 1.94 m (6 ft 4 in) | 88 kg (194 lb) | 31 – 7 January 1995 |
| PG | 6 | (Algeria) | Kaouane, Abdelhalim | 1.78 m (5 ft 10 in) | 78 kg (172 lb) | 44 – 29 November 1981 |
| SF | 7 | (Algeria) | Souici, Zineddine | 1.82 m (6 ft 0 in) | 80 kg (176 lb) |
| PG | 8 | (Algeria) | Bachouche, Adel | 1.87 m (6 ft 2 in) | 80 kg (176 lb) | 21 – 26 December 2004 |
| PG | 9 | (Algeria) | Benamghar, Mohamed Ali | 1.80 m (5 ft 11 in) | 71 kg (157 lb) | 18 – 5 August 2008 |
| PG | 11 | (Algeria) | Henna, Abdelhak | 1.89 m (6 ft 2 in) | 80 kg (176 lb) | 27 – 11 August 1999 |
| G/F | 12 | (Algeria) | Foughali, Zakaria | 1.92 m (6 ft 4 in) | 80 kg (176 lb) | 20 – 31 January 2006 |
| G | 14 | (Algeria) | Chebel, Louai Abd El Basset | 1.99 m (6 ft 6 in) | 92 kg (203 lb) | 28 – 29 January 1998 |
| F | 21 | (Algeria) | Mouaci, Akram | 1.95 m (6 ft 5 in) | 80 kg (176 lb) | 18 – 19 May 2008 |
| PF | 23 | (Algeria) | Mitidji, Kadour | 1.90 m (6 ft 3 in) | 88 kg (194 lb) | 28 – 10 August 1998 |
| C | 24 | (Algeria) | Salhi, Ahmed | 2.08 m (6 ft 10 in) | 96 kg (212 lb) | 24 – 21 November 2001 |
| G | 32 | (Algeria) | Achache Cherif, Djamel Eddine Anouar | 1.98 m (6 ft 6 in) | 80 kg (176 lb) | 36 – 30 October 1989 |
| C | 44 | (Algeria) | Zitoun, Rabah | 2.11 m (6 ft 11 in) | 95 kg (209 lb) | 37 – 3 September 1988 |
| G/F | 45 | (Algeria) | Messad, Ali Mohamed | 1.98 m (6 ft 6 in) | 85 kg (187 lb) | 36 – 31 August 1989 |
| F | 55 | (Democratic Republic of the Congo) | Ekamba, Exause Moke | | | 21 – 3 July 2005 |
| PF | 99 | (Algeria) | Sahraoui, Mohamed Akram | 1.93 m (6 ft 4 in) | 86 kg (190 lb) | 30 – 15 August 1996 |

Head coach

- (Algeria) Reda Hachemi

Assistant coach(es)

- (Algeria) Samir Mehnaoui

Legend

- (C) Team captain
- (I) Import player
- Injured

- Roster
Updated: April 1, 2026

== Regular season series ==
The regular season series ended 1–1.

October 4, 2025
18:00

Boxscore

NB Staouéli 87, WO Boufarik 84 (OT)
Scoring by quarter: –, –, –, –, Overtime: –
| Pts: Hichem Dekakene 25; Rebs: Mohamed Amine Bensalah 10; Asts: Anis Mohamed Fedala 6 | Pts: Mohamed Akram Sahraoui 37; Rebs: Rabah Zitoun 11; Asts: Tarek Hamdani 5 |

Salle OMS de Staouéli, Staoueli
Referees: Anis Bennani, Wahid Latibi, Abderrezak Fouchane

January 2, 2026
16:00

Boxscore

WO Boufarik 81, NB Staouéli 72
Scoring by quarter: –, –, –, –
| Pts: Kadour Mitidji 27; Rebs: Rabah Zitoun 8 Asts: Tarek Hamdani 8 | Pts: Mohamed Amine Bensalah 33; Rebs: Mohamed Amine Bensalah 9 Asts: Three players 3 |

Salle Moussa Cheraf, Boufarik
Referees: Mhamed Berrah, Mohamed Bouarifi, Abderrezak Fouchane

== Playoff ==
=== Quarter-finals ===
==== (1) NB Staouéli vs. (8) CR Beni Saf ====
| April 3, 2026 | NB Staouéli | 66–56 (Series: NB Staouéli leads series, 1–0) | CR Beni Saf | Salle OMS de Staouéli, Staoueli |
| 16:00 | Scoring by quarter: 19–15, 18–7, 15–17, 14–17 |
| | Pts: Merouane Yahya 18; Rebs: Mohamed Amine Bensalah, Abderraouf Benrighi 9 Asts: Anis Mohamed Fedala 9 | Boxscore | Pts: Issam Benarbia 19; Rebs: Houssam Moussa Benyacine 10; Asts: Imad Didi 4 | Attendance: 100; Referees: Larouci Adlen, Harrache Mouad, Fouchane Abderrezak |

| April 8, 2026 | CR Beni Saf | 56–48 (Series: Series tied, 1–1) | NB Staouéli | Salle OMS Yousfi Said, Béni Saf |
| 16:00 | Scoring by quarter: 16–13, 13–12, 10–8, 17–15 |
| | Pts: Mamadou Keita 15; Rebs: Brahim Maaziz 8 Asts: Houssam Moussa Benyacine 4 | Boxscore | Pts: Mohamed Amine Bensalah 21; Rebs: Khaled Ouahab 11; Asts: Anis Mohamed Fedala 6 | Attendance: 200; Referees: Kahallou Adel, Bouarifi Mohamed, Chaib Fethi |

| April 12, 2026 | NB Staouéli | 62–57 (Series: NB Staouéli wins series, 2–1) | CR Beni Saf | Salle OMS de Staouéli, Staoueli |
| 17:00 | Scoring by quarter: 18–10, 15–17, 16–7, 13–23 |
| | Pts: Mohamed Amine Bensalah 22; Rebs: Mohamed Amine Bensalah 12; Asts: There players 3 | Boxscore | Pts: Mohamed Azzi 15; Rebs: Brahim Maaziz 8 Asts: Imad Didi 5 | Attendance: 500; Referees: Adlene Laarouci, Adel Kahalou, Anis Benani |

==== (2) WO Boufarik vs. (7) MC Alger ====
| April 3, 2026 | WO Boufarik | 91–75 (Series: WO Boufarik leads series, 1–0) | MC Alger | Salle Moussa Cheraf, Boufarik |
| 18:00 | Scoring by quarter: 19–22, 22–22, 21–18, 29–13 |
| | Pts: Ali Mohamed Messad 16; Rebs: Rabah Zitoun 9 Asts: Tarek Hamdani 11 | Boxscore | Pts: Ramzi Merahi 22; Rebs: Samir Mokdad 9 Asts: Merouane Bourkaib 7 | Attendance: 800; Referees: Bennani Anis, Hammada Sofiane, Latibi Wahid |

| April 8, 2026 | MC Alger | 71–63 (Series: Series tied, 1–1) | WO Boufarik | Salle OMS Abdelaziz Ben Tifour, Hydra |
| 16:00 | Scoring by quarter: 20–13, 15–20, 28–16, 8–14 |
| | Pts: Abdelkrim Ziane 13; Rebs: Samir Mokdad 13; Asts: Ramzi Merahi 7 | Boxscore | Pts: Tarek Hamdani, Kadour Mitidji 18; Rebs: Djamel Eddine Achache 11; Asts: Tarek Hamdani 5 | Attendance: 600; Referees: Si Youcef Sofiane, Hamid Kaddour, Harrache Mouad |

| April 12, 2026 | WO Boufarik | 98–94 (Series: WO Boufarik wins series, 2–1) | MC Alger | Salle Moussa Cheraf, Boufarik |
| 18:00 | Scoring by quarter: 29–22, 22–17, 22–24, 25–31 |
| | Pts: Kadour Mitidji 26; Rebs: Rabah Zitoun 14; Asts: Tarek Hamdani 5 | Boxscore | Pts: Ramzi Merahi 19; Rebs: Mustapha Adrar 10; Asts: Merouane Bourkaib 8 | Attendance: 2000; Referees: Si Youcef Sofiane, Hamada Sofiane, Latibi Wahid |

=== Semi-finals ===
==== (1) NB Staouéli vs. (4) USM Alger ====
| April 21, 2026 | NB Staouéli | 75–64 (Series: NB Staouéli leads series, 1–0) | USM Alger | Salle OMS de Staouéli, Staoueli |
| 19:00 | Scoring by quarter: 22–18, 20–14, 13–20, 20–12 |
| | Pts: Hichem Dekakene 28; Rebs: Mohamed Amine Bensalah 8 Asts: Merouane Yahya 5 | Boxscore | Pts: Ahmed Boutiba 15; Rebs: Ahmed Boutiba 8 Asts: Zakariya Khodja 11 | Attendance: 1200; Referees: Larouci Adlen, Kahallou Adel, Hammada Sofiane |

| April 24, 2026 | USM Alger | 57–60 (Series: NB Staouéli wins series, 2–0) | NB Staouéli | Salle OMS Abdelaziz Ben Tifour, Hydra |
| 17:00 | Scoring by quarter: 18–11, 13–16, 16–16, 10–17 |
| | Pts: Ahmed Boutiba 25; Rebs: Redouane Mimouni, Mehdi Zaim 8 Asts: Four players 2 | Boxscore | Pts: Mohamed Amine Bensalah 21; Rebs: Mohamed Boussad 9 Asts: Mohamed Boussad 4 | Attendance: 500; Referees: Si Youcef Sofiane, Hammada Sofiane, Meheni Habib |

==== (2) WO Boufarik vs. (3) CS Tlemcen ====
| April 21, 2026 | WO Boufarik | 62–55 (Series: WO Boufarik leads series, 1–0) | CS Tlemcen | Salle Moussa Cheraf, Boufarik |
| 18:00 | Scoring by quarter: 15–19, 15–14, 16–10, 16–12 |
| | Pts: Tarek Hamdani 16; Rebs: Rabah Zitoun 10; Asts: Tarek Hamdani 5 | Boxscore | Pts: Mustapha Braik 19; Rebs: Farouk Hadjadj-Aoul 13; Asts: Farouk Hadjadj-Aoul 8 | Attendance: 2000; Referees: Si Youcef Sofiane, Hamid Kaddour, Bennani Anis |

| April 24, 2026 | CS Tlemcen | 73–80 (Series: WO Boufarik wins series, 2–0) | WO Boufarik | Salle OMS Kara Zaitri Imama, Tlemcen |
| 18:00 | Scoring by quarter: 18–19, 14–24, 21–19, 20–18 |
| | Pts: Abakar Outman Oumar 19; Rebs: Abakar Outman Oumar 12; Asts: Mustapha Braik 9 | Boxscore | Pts: Kadour Mitidji, Mohamed Akram Sahraoui 17; Rebs: Rabah Zitoun 6 Asts: Tarek Hamdani 8 | Attendance: 500; Referees: Hamid Kaddour, Bouarifi Mohamed, Harrache Mouad |

== Game summaries ==
At the end of these games, the winning teams will play two (2) Final matches, during which the Champion of Algeria for the 2025–26 sports season will be determined according to the FIBA system: If the score is tied at the end of the first game, no overtime will be played. (Article D.6.2 and Official FIBA Regulations). If the total score of the two games is tied at the end of the second game, the second game will continue with as many 5-minute overtimes as necessary to determine a winner. (Article D.6.3 and Official FIBA Regulations).

=== First leg ===
June 4, 2026
18:00

Boxscore

| NB Staouéli | 82–64 | WO Boufarik |
Scoring by quarter: 25–18, 19–19, 19–13, 19–14
| Pts: Anis Mohamed Fedala 17; Rebs: Zakaria Maatoub 11; Asts: Merouane Yahya, Abderraouf Benrighi 3 | | Pts: Mohamed Akram Sahraoui 17; Rebs: Djamel Achache 8 Asts: Tarek Hamdani 6 |
NB Staouéli leads series, 1–0

La Coupole d'Alger Arena, Dély Ibrahim, Algiers
Attendance: 2501
Referees: Si Youcef Sofiane, Hammada Sofia, Latibi Wahid

| Starters: | | | Pts | Reb | Ast |
|---|---|---|---|---|---|
| PG | 4 | (Algeria) Anis Mohamed Fedala | 17 | 5 | 0 |
| PF | 7 | (Algeria) Mohamed Amine Bensalah | 2 | 2 | 0 |
| PF | 8 | (Algeria) Merouane Yahya | 8 | 0 | 0 |
| G | 10 | (Algeria) Abderraouf Benrighi | 10 | 5 | 3 |
| C | 11 | (Algeria) Zakaria Maatoub | 12 | 11 | 1 |
| Reserves: | | | | | |
| G | 5 | (Algeria) Hamoud Slimani | 0 | 1 | 1 |
| SF | 6 | (Algeria) Zine-Eddine Tifoura | 0 | 2 | 0 |
| G/F | 12 | (Algeria) Sami Izedine Aious | 3 | 9 | 2 |
| G | 13 | (Algeria) Khaled Ouahab | 4 | 3 | 1 |
| PG | 14 | (Algeria) Mohamed Boussad | 14 | 4 | 1 |
| PF | 15 | (Algeria) Hichem Dekakene | 12 | 2 | 2 |
Head coach:
(Algerian Basketball Federation) Mohamed Yahya

| NB Staouéli | WO Boufarik |

| NB Staouéli | Statistics | WO Boufarik |
|---|---|---|
| 22/45 (48%) | 2-pt field goals | 16/32 (50%) |
| 9/27 (33%) | 3-pt field goals | 1/22 (4%) |
| 11/17 (64%) | Free throws | 29/39 (74%) |
| 16 | Offensive rebounds | 11 |
| 30 | Defensive rebounds | 28 |
| 46 | Total rebounds | 39 |
| 14 | Assists | 12 |
| 19 | Turnovers | 20 |
| 16 | Steals | 10 |
| 4 | Blocks | 3 |
| 21 (17) | Fouls | 18 (21) |

| Starters: | | | Pts | Reb | Ast |
|---|---|---|---|---|---|
| PG | 1 | (Algeria) Tarek Hamdani | 11 | 5 | 6 |
| G | 14 | (Algeria) Louai Chebel | 6 | 1 | 0 |
| PF | 23 | (Algeria) Kadour Mitidji | 9 | 3 | 1 |
| C | 44 | (Algeria) Rabah Zitoun | 4 | 3 | 1 |
| F | 55 | (Democratic Republic of the Congo) Exause Moke Ekamba | 4 | 2 | 1 |
| Reserves: | | | | | |
| PG | 8 | (Algeria) Adel Bachouche | 2 | 5 | 2 |
| G/F | 12 | (Algeria) Zakaria Foughali | 0 | 0 | 0 |
| F | 21 | (Algeria) Akram Mouaci | 0 | 0 | 0 |
| C | 24 | (Algeria) Ahmed Salhi | DNP | | |
| G | 32 | (Algeria) Djamel Achache | 6 | 8 | 0 |
| G/F | 45 | (Algeria) Ali Mohamed Messad | 5 | 1 | 1 |
| PF | 99 | (Algeria) Mohamed Akram Sahraoui | 17 | 6 | 0 |
Head coach:
(Algerian Basketball Federation) Hachemi Reda

=== Second leg ===
TV1, TV2

June 5, 2026
16:30

Boxscore

| WO Boufarik | 87–79 | NB Staouéli |
Scoring by quarter: 22–20, 30–15, 17–18, 18–26
| Pts: Kadour Mitidji 18; Rebs: Djamel Achache 10; Asts: Tarek Hamdani 11 | | Pts: Hichem Dekakene 27; Rebs: Hichem Dekakene 8 Asts: Merouane Yahya 4 |
Series tied, 1–1

La Coupole d'Alger Arena, Dély Ibrahim, Algiers
Attendance: 1500
Referees: Si Youcef Sofiane, Bennani Anis, Hammada Sofiane

| Starters: | | | Pts | Reb | Ast |
|---|---|---|---|---|---|
| PG | 1 | (Algeria) Tarek Hamdani | 5 | 5 | 11 |
| PF | 23 | (Algeria) Kadour Mitidji | 18 | 2 | 0 |
| G | 32 | (Algeria) Djamel Achache | 9 | 10 | 1 |
| C | 44 | (Algeria) Rabah Zitoun | 14 | 8 | 1 |
| F | 55 | (Democratic Republic of the Congo) Exause Moke Ekamba | 2 | 6 | 2 |
| Reserves: | | | | | |
| F | 0 | (Algeria) Akram Mouaci | DNP | | |
| PG | 8 | (Algeria) Adel Bachouche | 9 | 6 | 6 |
| G/F | 12 | (Algeria) Zakaria Foughali | DNP | | |
| G | 14 | (Algeria) Louai Chebel | 15 | 3 | 0 |
| C | 24 | (Algeria) Ahmed Salhi | DNP | | |
| G/F | 45 | (Algeria) Ali Mohamed Messad | 5 | 1 | 0 |
| PF | 99 | (Algeria) Mohamed Akram Sahraoui | 10 | 3 | 2 |
Head coach:
(Algerian Basketball Federation) Reda Hachemi

| WO Boufarik | NB Staouéli |

| WO Boufarik | Statistics | NB Staouéli |
|---|---|---|
| 18/39 (46%) | 2-pt field goals | 19/47 (40%) |
| 12/29 (41%) | 3-pt field goals | 6/20 (30%) |
| 15/23 (65%) | Free throws | 23/40 (57%) |
| 13 | Offensive rebounds | 13 |
| 37 | Defensive rebounds | 27 |
| 50 | Total rebounds | 40 |
| 23 | Assists | 16 |
| 24 | Turnovers | 14 |
| 5 | Steals | 11 |
| 4 | Blocks | 7 |
| 25 (14) | Fouls | 17 (25) |

| Starters: | | | Pts | Reb | Ast |
|---|---|---|---|---|---|
| PG | 4 | (Algeria) Anis Mohamed Fedala | 8 | 1 | 2 |
| PF | 8 | (Algeria) Merouane Yahya | 0 | 1 | 4 |
| G | 10 | (Algeria) Abderraouf Benrighi | 2 | 4 | 2 |
| C | 11 | (Algeria) Zakaria Maatoub | 4 | 4 | 0 |
| PF | 15 | (Algeria) Hichem Dekakene | 27 | 8 | 1 |
| Reserves: | | | | | |
| G | 5 | (Algeria) Hamoud Slimani | 8 | 3 | 1 |
| SF | 6 | (Algeria) Zine-Eddine Tifoura | DNP | | |
| PF | 7 | (Algeria) Mohamed Amine Bensalah | DNP | | |
| G/F | 12 | (Algeria) Sami Izedine Aious | 10 | 3 | 1 |
| G | 13 | (Algeria) Khaled Ouahab | 6 | 6 | 3 |
| PG | 14 | (Algeria) Mohamed Boussad | 14 | 5 | 2 |
Head coach:
(Algerian Basketball Federation) Mohamed Yahya

=== Decisive ===
TV2

June 6, 2026
16:30

Boxscore

| NB Staouéli | 66–70 | WO Boufarik |
Scoring by quarter: 18–16, 17–21, 19–27, 12–6
| Pts: Hichem Dekakene 22; Rebs: Mohamed Amine Bensalah 14; Asts: Anis Mohamed Fedala 5 | | Pts: Tarek Hamdani, Kadour Mitidji 13; Rebs: Djamel Achache 9 Asts: Kadour Mitidji 5 |
WO Boufarik wins series, 2–1

La Coupole d'Alger Arena, Dély Ibrahim, Algiers
Attendance: 2 500
Referees: Si Youcef Sofiane, Hammada Sofiane, Latibi Wahid

| Starters: | | | Pts | Reb | Ast |
|---|---|---|---|---|---|
| PF | 7 | (Algeria) Mohamed Amine Bensalah | 16 | 14 | 2 |
| PF | 8 | (Algeria) Merouane Yahya | 7 | 4 | 2 |
| C | 11 | (Algeria) Zakaria Maatoub | 4 | 1 | 0 |
| PG | 14 | (Algeria) Mohamed Boussad | 7 | 5 | 3 |
| PF | 15 | (Algeria) Hichem Dekakene | 22 | 6 | 2 |
| Reserves: | | | | | |
| PG | 4 | (Algeria) Anis Fedala | 2 | 3 | 5 |
| G | 5 | (Algeria) Hamoud Slimani | DNP | | |
| SF | 6 | (Algeria) Zine-Eddine Tifoura | DNP | | |
| G | 10 | (Algeria) Abderraouf Benrighi | 4 | 5 | 1 |
| G/F | 12 | (Algeria) Sami Aious | 0 | 0 | 0 |
| G | 13 | (Algeria) Khaled Ouahab | 4 | 6 | 0 |
Head coach:
(Algerian Basketball Federation) Mohamed Yahya

| NB Staouéli | WO Boufarik |

| NB Staouéli | Statistics | WO Boufarik |
|---|---|---|
| 17/35 (48%) | 2-pt field goals | 19/46 (41%) |
| 4/27 (14%) | 3-pt field goals | 5/22 (22%) |
| 20/29 (68%) | Free throws | 17/29 (58%) |
| 10 | Offensive rebounds | 12 |
| 38 | Defensive rebounds | 34 |
| 48 | Total rebounds | 46 |
| 15 | Assists | 19 |
| 14 | Turnovers | 12 |
| 7 | Steals | 10 |
| 3 | Blocks | 1 |
| 20 (22) | Fouls | 22 (20) |

2026 Super Division champions
WO Boufarik

| Starters: | | | Pts | Reb | Ast |
|---|---|---|---|---|---|
| PG | 1 | (Algeria) Tarek Hamdani | 13 | 7 | 4 |
| PF | 23 | (Algeria) Kadour Mitidji | 13 | 4 | 5 |
| G | 32 | (Algeria) Djamel Achache | 9 | 9 | 2 |
| C | 44 | (Algeria) Rabah Zitoun | 6 | 7 | 0 |
| F | 55 | (Democratic Republic of the Congo) Exause Moke Ekamba | 5 | 3 | 1 |
| Reserves: | | | | | |
| F | 2 | (Algeria) Akram Mouaci | DNP | | |
| PG | 8 | (Algeria) Adel Bachouche | 2 | 4 | 4 |
| G/F | 12 | (Algeria) Zakaria Foughali | DNP | | |
| G | 14 | (Algeria) Louai Chebel | 10 | 5 | 1 |
| C | 24 | (Algeria) Ahmed Salhi | DNP | | |
| G/F | 45 | (Algeria) Ali Mohamed Messad | 0 | 1 | 0 |
| PF | 99 | (Algeria) Mohamed Akram Sahraoui | 12 | 2 | 2 |
Head coach:
(Algerian Basketball Federation) Reda Hachemi
