= 2024 Algerian Basketball Super Division Finals =

Team	Coach	Wins
WO Boufarik	Sofiane Boulahia	2
TRA Draria	Amine Chenieff	0
- Dates: June 28– July 2
- MVP: Rabah Zitoun

2024 Algerian Basketball Super Division Finals was a final between the two top Algerian basketball teams, WO Boufarik has 9 titles, the last of which was in the 2001–02 season. As for TRA Draria qualified for the first time in its history. After the Playoffs, the final is played between the first-place team and the second-place team. The first leg will be played on June 28 in Boufarik, the second leg is scheduled for July 2 in Staoueli, while the big one if necessary, will take place on July 6 in Rouiba.

== Overviews ==
=== WO Boufarik roster ===
Note: Flags indicate national team eligibility at FIBA-sanctioned events. Players may hold other non-FIBA nationalities not displayed.

WO Boufarik roster
Players
Coaches

Pos.	No.	Nat.	Name	Ht.	Age
	00	(Algeria)	Merahi, Lamouri		30 – 6 October 1995
	1	(Algeria)	Hamdani, Tarek	1.92 m (6 ft 4 in)	31 – 7 January 1995
PG	6	(Algeria)	Kaouane, Abdelhalim (C)	1.80 m (5 ft 11 in)	44 – 29 November 1981
	7	(Algeria)	Hamdani, Abdellah	2.00 m (6 ft 7 in)	34 – 11 January 1992
C	10	(Algeria)	Touati, Mohamed Seddik	2.16 m (7 ft 1 in)	39 – 25 January 1987
PG	11	(Algeria)	Henna, Abdelhak	1.89 m (6 ft 2 in)	26 – 11 August 1999
	15	(Algeria)	Mimouni, Redouane
SG	23	(Algeria)	Métidji, Kadour	1.95 m (6 ft 5 in)	27 – 10 August 1998
	24	(Algeria)	Amairia, Mohamed	2.00 m (6 ft 7 in)
SF	32	(Algeria)	Achache, Cherif Djamel Eddine	1.98 m (6 ft 6 in)	36 – 30 October 1989
C	44	(Algeria)	Zitoun, Rabah	2.05 m (6 ft 9 in)	37 – 3 September 1988

Head coach

- (Algeria) Sofiane Boulahia

Assistant coach(es)

- (Algeria) Samir Mehnaoui

Legend

- (C) Team captain
- (I) Import player
- Injured

=== TRA Draria roster ===
Note: Flags indicate national team eligibility at FIBA-sanctioned events. Players may hold other non-FIBA nationalities not displayed.

TRA Draria roster
Players
Coaches

Pos.	No.	Nat.	Name	Ht.	Age
	4	(Algeria)	Boumedfa, Slimane
	5	(Algeria)	Nouari, Nabil	1.88 m (6 ft 2 in)
	6	(Algeria)	Benbrahim, Sif Eddine
	7	(Algeria)	Berouane, Adem Mohamed	1.89 m (6 ft 2 in)
	8	(Algeria)	Mokrani, Adel
	9	(Algeria)	Ait Ziane, Mohamed Amziane
	10	(Algeria)	Bensalah, Amine
	11	(Algeria)	Diar, Nourelislem
	13	(Algeria)	Bellabes, Djawed
	15	(Algeria)	Bouchaib, Habib (C)
	21	(Algeria)	Belkhodja, Fayçal Zerouk	1.93 m (6 ft 4 in)	38 – 3 February 1988
	24	(Algeria)	Aouana, Abdelmalek		23 – 26 May 2003

Head coach

- (Algeria) Amine Chenieff

Assistant coach(es)

- (Algeria) Said Djouadi

Legend

- (C) Team captain
- (I) Import player
- Injured

== Regular season series ==
The Two Team Tied in the regular season series 1–1.

February 20, 2024 (Note: On January 26, 2024 The game was stopped at the end of the second quarter with a score of 31–45 for WO Boufarik. Later the match will be replayed in Rouiba on February 20, 2024.)

TRA Draria 69, WO Boufarik 66

Salle OMS Mohamed Kadiri

April 23, 2024

Boxscore

WO Boufarik 84, TRA Draria 73
Scoring by quarter: 21–18, 22–9, 21–25, 20–21

Salle Moussa Chiraf

== Playoff ==
The playoff competition took place in two stages, the first in Staoueli and the second in Boufarik, the first and second qualify for the final. WO Boufarik grabbed the first ticket to the final thanks to its victory against NB Staouéli (76–67), in a match counting for the 4th day of the play-offs. TRA Draria will be WO Boufarik’s opponent in the final. The formation of the capital qualified for the first time in its history for this stage of the competition thanks to its victory gleaned, with forceps, against USM Alger but also the defeat of MC Alger recorded against the WOB.

Playoffs table
Pos	Team	Pld	W	L	GF	GA	GD	Pts	
1	WO Boufarik	5	5	0	402	366	+36	10	Qualification to the Super Division final
2	TRA Draria	5	3	2	395	369	+26	8	Qualification to the Super Division final
3	MC Alger	5	3	2	342	318	+24	8	
4	NB Staouéli	5	3	2	382	351	+31	8	
5	USM Alger	5	1	4	370	396	−26	6	
6	NA Hussein Dey	5	0	5	348	439	−91	5	

First match(es) will be played: June 22, 2024. Source:

May 31, 2024 Round 1	WO Boufarik	85–78	USM Alger	Staoueli
15:00	Scoring by quarter: 20–21, 23–24, 23–10, 19–23
	Pts: Redouane Mimouni 15; Rebs: Mohamed Seddik Touati 9 Asts: Four players 4	Boxscore	Pts: Nabil Saidi 15; Rebs: Lotfi Adrar 6 Asts: Tarek Redouane 5	Arena: Salle de Staouéli; Referees: Mohamed Houari Benmendil, Abderezak Fouchene

May 31, 2024 Round 1	NA Hussein Dey	73–91	TRA Draria	Staoueli
17:00	Scoring by quarter: 24–24, 19–18, 15–33, 15–16
	Pts: Two players 19; Rebs: Omar Belliche 13; Asts: Two players 5	Boxscore	Pts: Amine Bensalah 21; Rebs: Amine Bensalah 12; Asts: Three players 5	Arena: Salle de Staouéli; Referees: Mhamed Berrah, Mouaadh Harrache

June 1, 2024 Round 2	TRA Draria	80–81	WO Boufarik	Staoueli
17:00	Scoring by quarter: 23–20, 19–23, 17–22, 21–16
	Pts: Amine Bensalah 23; Rebs: Amine Bensalah 14; Asts: Fayçal Zerouk Belkhodja 4	Boxscore	Pts: Kadour Métidji 14; Rebs: Mohamed Seddik Touati 9 Asts: Two players 5	Arena: Salle de Staouéli; Referees: Mohamed Bouarifi, Abderezak Fouchene

June 20, 2024 Round 3	NB Staouéli	81–80	TRA Draria	Boufarik
15:00	Scoring by quarter: 21–17, 18–20, 18–18, 24–25
	Pts: Hichem Dahkakene 27; Rebs: Chakib Sedoud 12; Asts: Mohamed Boussaad 5	Boxscore	Pts: Abdelmalek Aouana 22; Rebs: Abdelmalek Aouana 12; Asts: Fayçal Zerouk Belkhodja 6	Arena: Moussa Chiraf Arena; Referees: Farid Amrane, Abderezak Fouchene

June 20, 2024 Round 3	WO Boufarik	89–72	NA Hussein Dey	Boufarik
19:00	Scoring by quarter: 32–22, 17–11, 16–23, 24–16
	Pts: Abdellah Hamdani 17; Rebs: Cherif Djamel Achache 20; Asts: Tarek Hamdani 7	Boxscore	Pts: Abdelkrim Ziane 14; Rebs: Abdessalem Semrouni 11; Asts: Abdelkrim Ziane 8	Arena: Moussa Chiraf Arena; Referees: Brahim Ferhani, Mohamed Bouarifi

June 21, 2024 Round 4	TRA Draria	61–59	MC Alger	Boufarik
17:00	Scoring by quarter: 22–13, 15–20, 13–17, 11–9
	Pts: Amine Bensalah 17; Rebs: Amine Bensalah 9 Asts: Fayçal Zerouk Belkhodja 8	Boxscore	Pts: Mustapha Adrar 14; Rebs: Mustapha Adrar 7 Asts: Merouane Bourkaib 5	Arena: Moussa Chiraf Arena; Referees: Mohamed Bouarifi, Abderezak Fouchene

June 21, 2024 Round 4	WO Boufarik	76–67	NB Staouéli	Boufarik
19:00	Scoring by quarter: 17–21, 11–12, 22–21, 26–13
	Pts: Kadour Métidji 25; Rebs: Cherif Djamel Achache 9 Asts: Abdelhalim Kaouane 11	Boxscore	Pts: Hichem Dahkakene 21; Rebs: Zakaria Matoub 8 Asts: Hichem Dahkakene 7	Arena: Moussa Chiraf Arena; Referees: Mhamed Berrah, Brahim Ferhani

June 22, 2024 Round 5	USM Alger	75–83(OT)	TRA Draria	Boufarik
17:00	Scoring by quarter: 16–21, 20–14, 18–11, 16–24, Overtime: 5–13
	Pts: Nabil Saidi 14; Rebs: Two players 10; Asts: Two players 5	Boxscore	Pts: Adel Mokrani 26; Rebs: Two players 9 Asts: Amine Bensalah 6	Arena: Moussa Chiraf Arena; Referees: Mhamed Berrah, Farid Amrane

June 22, 2024 Round 5	MC Alger	69–71	WO Boufarik	Boufarik
19:00	Scoring by quarter: 15–16, 15–23, 13–8, 26–24
	Pts: Mustapha Adrar 14; Rebs: Abdesslem Dekkiche 12; Asts: Ramzi Merahi 6	Boxscore	Pts: Mohamed Seddik Touati 22; Rebs: Mohamed Seddik Touati 15; Asts: Abdelhalim Kaouane 8	Arena: Moussa Chiraf Arena; Referees: Sofiane Hammada, Brahim Ferhani

== Game summaries ==
=== First leg ===
WO Boufarik won the first leg of the final of the Super Division, thanks to its clear victory against its rival TRA Draria with a score of (83–59). Indeed, Sofiane Boulahia's capes have stood alone since the first quarter (17-8). Subsequently, the comrades of captain Abdelhalim Kaouane maintained the pace throughout the last three quarters (31-24, 55-40, 83-59). WO Boufarik's coach Sofiane Boulahia said “We had to close the spaces and stop TRA Draria’s three-point shots which are really deadly. However, we must not declare victory early, because there is still the second round. Now, we have to stay focused and focus on the recovery of the players, to have strength on Tuesday, especially since nothing has been done yet and everything can change at any time”.

Friday, June 28
19:00

Boxscore

WO Boufarik	83–59	TRA Draria
Scoring by quarter: 17–8, 14–16, 24–16, 28–19
Pts: Rabah 17; Rebs: Merahi, Rabah 7 Asts: Kaouane 6		Pts: Belkhodja 20; Rebs: Bensalah 7 Asts: Belkhodja 4
WO Boufarik leads series, 1–0

Moussa Chiraf Arena, Boufarik
Referees: Hamid Kaddour, Mhamed Berrah, Mohamed Bouarifi

Starters:			Pts	Reb	Ast
	2	(Algeria) Laamouri Merahi	11	7	2
PG	6	(Algeria) Abdelhalim Kaouane	7	6	6
	7	(Algeria) Abdellah Hamdani	5	5	3
	15	(Algeria) Redouane Mimouni	13	6	1
C	44	(Algeria) Rabah Zitoun	17	7	1
Reserves:					
	1	(Algeria) Tarek Hamdani	0	2	4
	9	(Algeria) Haithem Menacer	0	0	1
C	10	(Algeria) Mohamed Seddik Touati	6	4	1
PG	11	(Algeria) Abdelhak Henna	5	1	1
	12	(Algeria) Zakaia Foughali	2	0	0
SG	23	(Algeria) Kadour Métidji	11	6	2
SF	32	(Algeria) Cherif Djamel Eddine Achache	6	4	2
Head coach:
(Algerian Basketball Federation) Sofiane Boulahia

WO Boufarik	TRA Draria

WO Boufarik	Statistics	TRA Draria
22/48 (45.8%)	2-pt field goals	16/50 (32%)
9/29 (31%)	3-pt field goals	5/22 (22.7%)
12/20 (60%)	Free throws	12/18 (66.7%)
18	Offensive rebounds	15
39	Defensive rebounds	30
57	Total rebounds	45
24	Assists	12
8	Turnovers	13
	Steals	
10	Blocks	2
34	Fouls	37

Starters:		Pts	Reb	Ast
5	(Algeria) Nabil Nouari	4	4	2
8	(Algeria) Adel Mokrani	3	5	1
10	(Algeria) Amine Bensalah	2	7	1
21	(Algeria) Fayçal Zerouk Belkhodja	20	5	4
24	(Algeria) Abdelmalek Aouana	6	5	0
Reserves:				
4	(Algeria) Slimane Boumedfa	0	2	0
6	(Algeria) Sif Eddine Benbrahim	0	3	1
7	(Algeria) Adem Mohamed Berouane	17	2	1
9	(Algeria) Mohamed Amziane Ait Ziane	0	1	2
11	(Algeria) Nourelislem Diar	3	3	0
13	(Algeria) Djawed Bellabes	0	4	0
15	(Algeria) Habib Bouchaib	4	0	0
Head coach:
(Algerian Basketball Federation) Amine Chenieff

=== Second leg ===
WO Boufarik won its tenth Super Division basketball title by defeating TRA Draria 60-41 in the final round in Staouéli. TRA Draria played competitively in the first half of the game, leaving WO Boufarik with a narrow 27-25 lead at halftime. However, WO Boufarik pulled ahead in the second half to win the game by 19 points. This victory marks the club's first national championship in over 20 years. Team captain Abdelhalim Kaouane, played a major role in leading the team to the title.

Tuesday, July 2
17:00

Boxscore

TRA Draria	41–60	WO Boufarik
Scoring by quarter: 10–16, 15–11, 10–17, 6–16
Pts: Belkhodja 13; Rebs: Bensalah 13; Asts: Belkhodja 3		Pts: Métidji 15; Rebs: Métidji 12; Asts: Kaouane 5
WO Boufarik wins series, 2–0

Salle de Staouéli, Staoueli
Referees: Sofiane Si Youcef, Anis Bennani, Sofiane Hammada

Starters:		Pts	Reb	Ast
5	(Algeria) Nabil Nouari	5	1	2
7	(Algeria) Adem Mohamed Berouane	7	4	1
10	(Algeria) Amine Bensalah	7	13	1
15	(Algeria) Habib Bouchaib	0	3	2
24	(Algeria) Abdelmalek Aouana	6	12	1
Reserves:				
6	(Algeria) Sif Eddine Benbrahim	0	1	1
8	(Algeria) Adel Mokrani	DNP		
9	(Algeria) Mohamed Amziane Ait Ziane	3	2	0
11	(Algeria) Nourelislem Diar	0	0	0
12	(Algeria) Mounir Bounamra	DNP		
13	(Algeria) Djawed Bellabes	0	4	0
21	(Algeria) Fayçal Zerouk Belkhodja	13	12	3
Head coach:
(Algerian Basketball Federation) Amine Chenieff

TRA Draria	WO Boufarik

TRA Draria	Statistics	WO Boufarik
9/43 (20.9%)	2-pt field goals	18/42 (42.9%)
7/32 (21.9%)	3-pt field goals	5/29 (17.2%)
2/9 (22.2%)	Free throws	9/15 (60%)
21	Offensive rebounds	12
38	Defensive rebounds	40
59	Total rebounds	52
11	Assists	16
19	Turnovers	13
	Steals	
3	Blocks	8
24	Fouls	24

2024 Super Division champions
WO Boufarik
10th Super Division title

Starters:			Pts	Reb	Ast
	2	(Algeria) Laamouri Merahi	2	2	2
PG	6	(Algeria) Abdelhalim Kaouane	4	6	5
	15	(Algeria) Redouane Mimouni	7	2	0
SF	32	(Algeria) Cherif Djamel Eddine Achache	4	12	4
C	44	(Algeria) Rabah Zitoun	4	6	1
Reserves:					
	00	(Algeria) Haithem Menacer	3	0	0
	1	(Algeria) Tarek Hamdani	2	6	3
	7	(Algeria) Abdellah Hamdani	11	5	1
C	10	(Algeria) Mohamed Seddik Touati	6	2	0
PG	11	(Algeria) Abdelhak Henna	0	1	0
	14	(Algeria) Zakaia Foughali	2	2	0
SG	23	(Algeria) Kadour Métidji	15	2	0
Head coach:
(Algerian Basketball Federation) Sofiane Boulahia
