= 2025 Algerian Basketball Super Cup =

- Event: Algerian Basketball Super Cup
WO Boufarik	USM Alger
70	59
Head coach: Sofiane Boulahia	Head coach: Ali Benhocine
- Date: 11 February 2025
- Venue: La Coupole d'Alger Arena, Dély Ibrahim, Algiers
- Referees: Si Youcef Sofiane, Kaddour Hamid, Hamada Sofiane
- Attendance: 2.500

The 2023–24 Algerian Basketball Super Cup was contested between WO Boufarik, holders of the Super Division champion, and USM Alger, the Algerian Cup champion. The match was played at La Coupole of the Complexe sportif olympique Mohamed Boudiaf in Algiers.

== Background ==
USM Alger qualified for the Super Cup after winning the 53rd edition of the Algerian Cup in July 2024, defeating WO Boufarik 71–69 in the final at the same venue. The victory secured the first Algerian Cup title in the club's history, after previously losing the 1989 final to MC Alger. WO Boufarik entered the match as the 2024 Algerian champions after defeating TRA Draria in the Super Division finals (2–0), winning 83–59 in the first leg and 60–41 in the second. The title ended a drought of more than two decades for the Boufarik-based club. During the 2023–24 season, WO Boufarik had dominated USM Alger in league competition, defeating them three times, including two regular-season matches and one playoff game. However, USM Alger prevailed in the Algerian Cup final, preventing Boufarik from completing the domestic double.

WO Boufarik beat USM Alger with a score of 70–59.

== Game summary ==
February 11, 2025 Final	WO Boufarik	70–59	USM Alger	Algiers
17:00	Scoring by quarter: 27–15, 13–16, 12–13, 18–15
TV2, TV6	Pts: Kadour Métidji 13; Rebs: Rabah Zitoun 8 Asts: Fayçal Zerouk Belkhodja 7	Boxscore	Pts: Lamouri Merahi 13; Rebs: Ahmed Boutiba 8 Asts: Moussa Bougria 4	Arena: La Coupole d'Alger Arena; Attendance: 2,500; Referees: Si Youcef Sofiane, Kaddour Hamid, Hamada Sofiane

Starters:			Pts	Reb	Ast
SG	1	(Algeria) Tarek Hamdani	5	5	3
SG	23	(Algeria) Kadour Métidji	13	1	1
SF	32	(Algeria) Djamel Achache	11	7	2
C	44	(Algeria) Rabah Zitoun	12	8	0
PF	99	(Algeria) Mohamed Akram Sahraoui	10	3	2
Reserves:					
SG	8	(Algeria) Adel Bachouche	DNP		
C	10	(Algeria) Mohamed Seddik Touati	12	6	0
PG	11	(Algeria) Abdelhak Henna	0	0	2
SF	12	(Algeria) Zakaria Foughali	DNP		
PF	14	(Algeria) Louai Chebel	0	5	0
SG	15	(Algeria) Redouane Mimouni	7	3	2
SG	21	(Algeria) Fayçal Zerouk Belkhodja	0	4	7
Head coach:
(Algerian Basketball Federation) Sofiane Boulahia

WO Boufarik	USM Alger

WO Boufarik	Statistics	USM Alger
19/38 (50.0%)	2-pt field goals	19/49 (38.8%)
5/19 (26.3%)	3-pt field goals	2/28 (7.1%)
17/29 (58.6%)	Free throws	15/19 (78.9%)
12	Offensive rebounds	18
38	Defensive rebounds	27
50	Total rebounds	45
19	Assists	17
21	Turnovers	14
	Steals	
3	Blocks	2
34	Fouls	36

WO Boufarik
2nd Super Cup title

Starters:			Pts	Reb	Ast
C	0	(Algeria) Nabil Saidi	12	6	3
PF	2	(Algeria) Lamouri Merahi	13	4	2
PG	10	(Algeria) Bouhaous Messaoudi	8	6	3
F/C	24	(Algeria) Mohamed Amairia	11	7	1
G	77	(Algeria) Ahmed Boutiba	7	8	2
Reserves:					
SF	1	(Algeria) Ramadane Belhadj	3	4	2
PG	4	(Algeria) Zakaria Khoudja	DNP		
PF	7	(Algeria) Riadh Lakeb	DNP		
PF	9	(Algeria) Moussa Bougria	3	2	4
PF	11	(Algeria) Tarek Redouane	DNP		
SG	21	(Algeria) Bacim Medjoubi	0	0	0
C	26	(Algeria) Faredj Messaoudi	2	2	0
Head coach:
(Algerian Basketball Federation) Ali Benhocine
