= 2025–26 Algerian Basketball Cup =

2026 Algerian Basketball Cup
Tournament details
- Country: Algeria
- Dates: February 28 – May 16
- Teams: 16
- Defending champions: NB Staouéli

Final positions
- Champions: MC Alger
- Runners-up: NB Staouéli
- Semifinalists: WO Boufarik; TRA Draria

The 2025–26 Algerian Basketball Cup is the 57th edition of the Algerian Basketball Cup. The Round of 16 of the 2026 Algerian Basketball Cup (men's seniors) is scheduled to take place on 27–28 February 2026, following the draw held in Algiers. This stage features the fourteen Super-Division clubs along with two lower-division teams. The defending champions, NB Staouéli, will face M Ouled Chebel. The runners-up of the previous edition, USM Alger, are set to play against Rouiba CB. The two non–Super Division sides, WRB El-Eulma and SOC Annaba, will face TRA Draria and WO Boufarik, respectively.

== Bracket ==
Round of 16; 27–28 February
USM Alger	63
Rouiba CB	61
TRA Draria	81
WRB El Eulma	73
M Ouled Chebel	68
NB Staouéli	78
CS Tlemcen	66
USM Blida	46
MC Alger	78
NA Hussein Dey	75
US Sétif	56
CR Beni Saf	67
SOCA Annaba	68
WO Boufarik	78
CRB Dar Beida	76
CSC Djasr Kasentina	67

Quarter-finals; 17–18 April
USM Alger	74
TRA Draria	80
NB Staouéli	72
CS Tlemcen	47
MC Alger	67
CR Beni Saf	64
WO Boufarik	20
CRB Dar Beida	00

Semi-finals; 1–2 May
TRA Draria	53
NB Staouéli	60
MC Alger	78
WO Boufarik	74

Final; 16 May
NB Staouéli	90
MC Alger	96
Third place

== Round of 16 ==
Following the matches played on 27 and 28 February 2026, the round of 16 largely confirmed expectations, with most of the favorites advancing, although several games were closely contested. The NB Staouéli, the defending champions, secured a controlled 78–68 win over M Ouled Chebel, showing overall dominance and effective game management. Meanwhile, the MC Alger edged past NA Hussein Dey (78–75) in one of the tightest encounters of the round, decided in the final possessions. The CRB Dar Beida defeated CSC Djasr Kasentina (76–67) with a consistent performance across all four quarters. The CS Tlemcen comfortably beat USM Blida (66–46), building an early lead and maintaining control throughout the game.

In another matchup, the WO Boufarik eliminated SOC Annaba (78–68), capitalizing on stronger offensive efficiency in key moments. The TRA Draria overcame WRB El Eulma (81–73), thanks to steady scoring and solid end-game management. The biggest upset came from the CR Béni Saf, who defeated US Sétif (67–56), highlighting the competitive nature of the tournament and the potential for underdogs to challenge established teams. The last team to qualify for the quarter-finals was USM Alger after a narrow 63–61 win over Rouiba CB in a match played on March 27, 2026, following its postponement due to security issues. USMA built their success on a strong first quarter (23–15) and managed to hold on despite late pressure.

February 26, 2026	CRB Dar Beida	76–67	CSC Djasr Kasentina	Rouïba
22:00	Scoring by quarter: 19–22, 23–14, 19–19, 15–12
	Pts: Abdesselem Semrouni 29; Rebs: Abdesselem Semrouni, Younes Benanesbaghor 10; Asts: Sif Eddine Benbrahim 8	Boxscore	Pts: Zakaria Guezout 26; Rebs: Bouhaous Messaoudi 7 Asts: Moussa Bougria 5	Arena: Salle OMS Mohamed Kadiri; Referees: Larouci Adlene, Ousmane Sidali, Kahil Yacine

February 26, 2026	CS Tlemcen	66–46	USM Blida	Oran
22:00	Scoring by quarter: 14–20, 26–11, 9–11, 17–4
	Pts: Seyyid Ahmed Bensalah 15; Rebs: Abakar Outman Oumar 14; Asts: Farouk Hadjadj, Nizar Islam Taleb 3	Boxscore	Pts: Mousaab Kaoub 14; Rebs: Mohamed Boudoumi 11; Asts: Mohamed Zahaf, Mousaab Kaoub 2	Attendance: 40; Referees: Anis Bennani, Nadjet Zenagui, Abderazak Fouchen

February 26, 2026	MC Alger	78–75	NA Hussein Dey	Staoueli
22:00	Scoring by quarter: 26–18, 17–20, 18–14, 17–23
	Pts: Ramzi Merahi 21; Rebs: Oussama Aggoun 10; Asts: Merouane Bourkaib 9	Boxscore	Pts: Rayan Hamdi 23; Rebs: Redouane Haddad 10; Asts: Mounir Djellili 5	Arena: Salle OMS de Staouéli; Referees: Adel Kahalou, Bouarifi, Smail Heddi

February 27, 2026	SOCA Annaba	68–78	WO Boufarik	Bordj Bou Arréridj
21:00	Scoring by quarter: 19–17, 14–18, 22–18, 13–25
	Pts: Sabri Yousfi 17; Rebs: Sabri Yousfi 8 Asts: Hamza Seba 4	Boxscore	Pts: Kadour Mitidji 25; Rebs: Rabah Zitoun 11; Asts: Tarek Hamdani 12	Arena: Salle Baghoura Younes; Attendance: 200; Referees: Hamada Sofiane, Amrane Farid, Latibi Wahid

February 27, 2026	US Sétif	56–67	CR Beni Saf	Boufarik
22:00	Scoring by quarter: 8–20, 22–17, 14–10, 12–20
	Pts: Anis Azzouz 18; Rebs: Mutomb Mbav, Anis Azzouz 10; Asts: Yacine Kalkoul 5	Boxscore	Pts: Houssam Moussa Benyacine 17; Rebs: Houssam Moussa Benyacine 10; Asts: Imad Didi 5	Arena: Salle Moussa Cheraf; Attendance: 200; Referees: Kahalou Adel, Osmane Sid Ali, Zahaf Ali

February 27, 2026	M Ouled Chebel	68–78	NB Staouéli	Hydra
22:00	Scoring by quarter: 18–21, 12–14, 18–25, 20–18
	Pts: Slimane Boumedfa 16; Rebs: Diakite Demba 14; Asts: Abdelnacer Labadi, Slimane Boumedfa 6	Boxscore	Pts: Mohamed Amine Bensalah 18; Rebs: Mohamed Amine Bensalah 9 Asts: Merouane Yahya 7	Arena: Salle OMS Abdelaziz Ben Tifour; Attendance: 100; Referees: Adlene Larouci, Fateh Ghaib, Yacine Kahil

February 27, 2026	TRA Draria	81–73	WRB El Eulma	Bordj Bou Arréridj
22:30	Scoring by quarter: 24–11, 20–19, 13–16, 24–27
	Pts: Nabil Nouari 17; Rebs: Mounir Benamara 10; Asts: Omar Belliche 6	Boxscore	Pts: Madjdou Gouriri 25; Rebs: Aymen Hendel 8 Asts: Amine Rouabha, Malik Achour 4	Arena: Salle Baghoura Younes; Attendance: 200; Referees: Hamada Sofiane, Latibi Wahid, Amrane Farid

March 27, 2026	USM Alger	63–61	Rouiba CB	Staoueli
17:30	Scoring by quarter: 23–15, 15–21, 13–14, 12–11
	Pts: Merahi 22; Rebs: Merahi 10; Asts: Merahi 4	Boxscore	Pts: Abdel Hakim Abaz 13; Rebs: Abdel Hakim Abaz, Sid Ali Ben Zaim 8 Asts: Ziad Chenieff 4	Arena: Salle OMS de Staouéli; Attendance: 240; Referees: Larouci Adlene, Latibi Wahid, Harach Mouaad

== Quarter-finals ==
April 17, 2026	MC Alger	67–64	CR Beni Saf	Boukadir
15:00	Scoring by quarter: 15–17, 19–8, 21–15, 12–24
	Pts: Mohamed Seddik Touati 13; Rebs: Oussama Aggoun 12; Asts: Merouane Bourkaib 8	Boxscore	Pts: Houssam Moussa Benyacine 16; Rebs: Houssam Moussa Benyacine 8 Asts: Issam Benarbia 6	Arena: Salle OMS Boukadir; Attendance: 1000; Referees: Larouci Adlene, Bennani Anis, Osmane A

April 17, 2026	NB Staouéli	72–47	CS Tlemcen	Boukadir
17:00	Scoring by quarter: 19–8, 22–9, 8–16, 23–14
	Pts: Mohamed Amine Bensalah 24; Rebs: Three players 9 Asts: Hichem Dekakene 5	Boxscore	Pts: Yacine Benyahya 11; Rebs: Abakar Outman Oumar 14; Asts: Mustapha Braik 4	Arena: Salle OMS Boukadir; Referees: Si Youcef Sofiane, Kaddour Hamid, Hamada Sofiane

April 17, 2026	USM Alger	74–80(OT)	TRA Draria	Rouïba
18:00	Scoring by quarter: 25–20, 16–18, 13–19, 14–11, Overtime: 6–12
	Pts: Ahmed Boutiba 17; Rebs: Mehdi Zaim 12; Asts: Ramdane Belhadj 8	Boxscore	Pts: Faycal Zerouk Belkhodja 18; Rebs: Omar Belliche 10; Asts: Nabil Gueddoudj 5	Arena: Salle OMS Mohamed Kadiri; Attendance: 500; Referees: Kahalou Adel, Latibi Wahid, Marouf Mohamed

April 18, 2026	WO Boufarik	20–00	CRB Dar Beida	Staoueli
15:00
		Boxscore		Arena: Salle OMS de Staouéli; Referees: Bouarifi, Latibi Wahid, Kahil Yacine

== Semi-finals ==
May 1, 2026	WO Boufarik	74–78	MC Alger	La Coupole d'Alger Arena, Dély Ibrahim, Algiers
16:00	Scoring by quarter: 16–11, 24–22, 18–23, 16–22
	Pts: Louai Chebel 19; Rebs: Rabah Zitoun 10; Asts: Mohamed Sahraoui 4	Boxscore	Pts: Ramzi Merahi 21; Rebs: Ramzi Merahi 8 Asts: Merouane Bourkaib 7	Attendance: 5000; Referees: Bennani Anis, Hammada Sofiane, Latibi Wahid

May 2, 2026	TRA Draria	53–60	NB Staouéli	Hydra
16:00	Scoring by quarter: 12–19, 18–8, 9–11, 14–22
	Pts: Nabil Gueddoudj 14; Rebs: Lerry Essono Mve 13; Asts: Faycal Zerouk Belkhodja 3	Boxscore	Pts: Hichem Dekakene 24; Rebs: Khaled Ouahab 10; Asts: Anis Mohamed Fedala 5	Arena: Salle OMS Abdelaziz Ben Tifour; Attendance: 500; Referees: Kahallou Adel, Hammada Sofiane, Emtir Sahraoui

== Final ==
TV2

May 16, 2026
17:00

Boxscore

NB Staouéli	90–96	MC Alger
Scoring by quarter: 27–21, 18–20, 27–29, 18–26
Pts: Hichem Dekakene 22; Rebs: Merouane Yahya 7 Asts: Merouane Yahya 4		Pts: Mustapha Adrar 21; Rebs: Samir Mokdad 9 Asts: Merouane Bourkaib 11

La Coupole d'Alger Arena, Dély Ibrahim, Algiers
Attendance: 5000
Referees: Larouci Adlen, Kahallou Adel, Hammada Sofiane

Starters:			Pts	Reb	Ast
PF	7	(Algeria) Mohamed Amine Bensalah	16	5	2
PF	8	(Algeria) Merouane Yahya	7	7	4
C	11	(Algeria) Zakaria Maatoub	7	2	0
PG	14	(Algeria) Mohamed Boussad	14	5	2
PF	15	(Algeria) Hichem Dekakane	22	1	2
Reserves:					
PG	4	(Algeria) Anis Mohamed Fedala	17	4	2
G	5	(Algeria) Hamoud Slimani	DNP		
SF	6	(Algeria) Zine-Eddine Tifoura	DNP		
G	10	(Algeria) Abderraouf Benrighi	5	5	0
G/F	12	(Algeria) Sami Izedine Aious	DNP		
G	13	(Algeria) Khaled Ouahab	2	6	1
Head coach:
(Algerian Basketball Federation) Mohamed Yahya

NB Staouéli	MC Alger

NB Staouéli	Statistics	MC Alger
22/41 (53%)	2-pt field goals	25/41 (60%)
8/26 (30%)	3-pt field goals	9/25 (36%)
22/34 (64%)	Free throws	19/30 (63%)
11	Offensive rebounds	11
27	Defensive rebounds	34
38	Total rebounds	45
13	Assists	22
11	Turnovers	11
6	Steals	9
4	Blocks	2
17	Fouls	17

2026 Algerian Basketball Cup champions
MC Alger

Starters:			Pts	Reb	Ast
PF	2	(Algeria) Oussama Aggoun	15	7	1
C	5	(Algeria) Mustapha Adrar	21	7	1
PG	6	(Algeria) Merouane Bourkaib	17	8	11
PF	8	(Algeria) Ramzi Merahi	14	3	5
PF	17	(Algeria) Samir Mokdad	10	9	1
Reserves:					
PG	0	(Algeria) Abdelkrim Ziane	15	0	3
PF	4	(Algeria) Moncef Bahloul	0	0	0
PF	9	(Algeria) Abdelhak Benali	0	0	0
C	10	(Algeria) Mohamed Seddik Touati	4	2	0
SF	11	(Algeria) Mohamed Zergoug	0	1	0
G	14	(Algeria) Youcef Khalfallah	0	0	0
SG	22	(Algeria) Zakaria Aggoun	0	1	0
Head coach:
(Algerian Basketball Federation) Maamar Berrich
