= 2023–24 Algerian Basketball Cup =

2024 Algerian Basketball Cup
- Match programme cover

Tournament details
- Country: Algeria
- Dates: April 5 – July 17, 2024
- Teams: 22
- Defending champions: WO Boufarik

Final positions
- Champions: USM Alger
- Runners-up: WO Boufarik
- Semifinalists: TRA Draria; NA Hussein Dey

Tournament statistics
- Matches played: 21

The 2023–24 Algerian Basketball Cup was the 55th edition of the Algerian Basketball Cup. Consistent information from the Algerian Basketball Federation indicating the possibility of canceling the Algerian Cup final for the 2023–24 season. This situation comes following the refusal of the authorities of the Wilaya of Jijel to host the final between WO Boufarik and USM Alger despite the visit of the president of the FABB and the national competitions commission where an agreement was given previously by local authorities. As such, the Federation, which intends to reschedule this final in Algiers, has been informed that La Coupole d'Alger Arena is requisitioned for another extra-sporting event (cosmetic products exhibition) for the day of July 13.

== Round of 32 ==
The Round of 32 of the Algerian Basketball Cup will be played on April 5 and 6. Title holder, WO Boufarik is exempt from the round and will enter the competition in the round of 16 like three other teams in the Super Division, namely NB Staouéli, USM Blida and Rouiba CB.

April 5, 2024	USM Alger	80–48	ACB Tighenif	Boukadir
21:30
				Arena: Salle OMS Boukadir; Referees: Berrah, Haddad.S

April 5, 2024	NA Hussein Dey	93–73	IR Djasr Kassentina	Staoueli
23:00	Scoring by quarter: 20–21, 34–20, 16–11, 23–21
				Arena: Salle de Staouéli; Referees: Larouci, Fouchene

April 5, 2024	CRB Dar Beida	91–53	ES Cherchell	Blida
22:00
				Arena: Hocine Chalane Arena; Referees: Kahalou, Heddi

April 5, 2024	USA Bouna	55–78	TRA Draria	El Eulma
22:00
				Arena: Salle Mohamed Sayeh Kechkouchi; Referees: Hamada, Aimeur

April 5, 2024	WA Boufarik	50–71	OS Bordj Bou Arréridj	Rouïba
22:00
				Arena: Salle Omnisport de Rouïba; Referees: Ghaib, Kahil

April 5, 2024	RTK Khemis Miliana	60–66	JSB Ain El Araba	Oran
22:00
				Arena: Salle la LOFFA; Referees: Benmendil, Bourouis

April 5, 2024	CSBB Sidi Cheikh	61–75	PS El Eulma	Staoueli
21:30
				Arena: Salle de Staouéli; Referees: Si Youcef, Bouarifi

April 5, 2024	US Sétif	20–00	CS Hassi Messaoud	Biskra
22:00
				Arena: Salle OMS Biskra; Referees: Fritah, Youcef

April 6, 2024	JSB M'Sila	00–20	CR Beni Saf	Staoueli
22:30
				Arena: Salle de Staouéli; Referees: Amrane, Ferhani

== Round of 16 ==
The round of 16 of the Algerian Basketball Cup did not experience any notable surprises with the qualification for the quarter-finals of the main favorites. While only the members of the Super Division remain in the running, with the exception of JSB Ain El Araba (National 1), the hierarchy was respected with in particular the victory of WO Boufarik holder of the trophy, against USM Blida (55–82), in the Mitidja derby, or the success of the outgoing Algerian champion, USM Alger against the newly promoted CR Béni Saf (68–85). For their part, NB Staouéli and MC Alger, also passed this round without much difficulty by dismissing, respectively, US Sétif (85–57) and Rouiba CB (74–47). Finally, note that TRA Draria, CSC Djasr Kasentina and NA Hussein Dey were propelled to the quarter-finals without playing following the withdrawals of JSB Ain El Araba, PS El Eulma and OS Bordj Bou Arreridj.

April 26, 2024	CR Beni Saf	68–85	USM Alger	Boukadir
15:00
				Arena: Salle OMS Boukadir; Referees: Zenagui, Salah

April 26, 2024	USM Blida	55–82	WO Boufarik	Staoueli
17:00	Scoring by quarter: 14–28, 21–19, 11–22, 9–13
		Boxscore		Arena: Salle de Staouéli; Referees: Si Youcef, Bouarifi

April 26, 2024	MC Alger	74–47	Rouiba CB	Blida
16:00	Scoring by quarter: 22–9, 21–14, 18–18, 13–6
		Boxscore		Arena: Hocine Chalane Arena; Referees: Larouci, Ferhani

April 26, 2024	NB Staouéli	85–57	US Sétif	Bordj Bou Arréridj
15:00	Scoring by quarter: 26–23, 18–10, 26–10, 15–14
		Boxscore		Arena: Salle OMS Bahoura; Referees: Amrane, Harrach

April 26, 2024	M Ouled Chebel	64–62	CRB Dar Beida	Staoueli
15:00	Scoring by quarter: 17–19, 15–8, 14–21, 18–14
		Boxscore		Arena: Salle de Staouéli; Referees: Kahalou, Fouchene

== Bracket ==
Quarter-finals; 20–21 May
CSC Djasr Kasentina	58
USM Alger	73
NA Hussein Dey	75
MC Alger	64
WO Boufarik	81
NB Staouéli	78
M Ouled Chebel	79
TRA Draria	88

Semi-finals; 13–14 June
USM Alger	59
NA Hussein Dey	41
WO Boufarik	67
TRA Draria	59

Final; 17 July
USM Alger	71
WO Boufarik	69

== Quarter-finals ==
USM Alger beat CSC Djasr Kasentina with a score of 73 to 58. The USMA basketball players, reigning Algerian champions, took well the match in hand, with a 20-point lead in the first quarter (29–09), then (42–28) at half-time. In the second half, the Usmists managed their lead on the scoreboard (57–37) in the third quarter, before ending the match with a 15-point lead (73–58). WO Boufarik reached the semi-finals by dominating NB Staouéli with a score of 81 to 78, in the quarter-final played at La Coupole d'Alger Arena, the advantage of the Boufarikois, carried by their long-time leader Abdelhalim Kaouane. In the second quarter, Sofiane Boulahia's men managed to widen the gap under the leadership of their pivot recruited at the start of the season, Seddik Touati, returning to the locker room with an 11-point lead (47–36). In the second half, Staoueli's players first reduced the gap to seven points at the end of the third quarter (67–60), before going ahead two minutes from the final whistle (78–76). But the experience of the players of Boufarik and the free throw skills allowed the WO Boufarik to get back in front and win at the wire with three points in advance (81–78).

=== CSC Djasr Kasentina vs. USM Alger ===
May 20, 2024	CSC Djasr Kasentina	58–73	USM Alger	Algiers
16:00	Scoring by quarter: 9–29, 19–13, 9–15, 21–16
		Boxscore		Arena: La Coupole d'Alger Arena; Referees: Bennani, Kaddour, Tahmi

=== WO Boufarik vs. NB Staouéli ===
May 20, 2024	WO Boufarik	81–78	NB Staouéli	Algiers
18:00	Scoring by quarter: 21–20, 26–16, 20–23, 14–19
		Boxscore		Arena: La Coupole d'Alger Arena; Referees: Si Youcef, Hamada, Emtir

=== M Ouled Chebel vs. TRA Draria ===
May 21, 2024	M Ouled Chebel	79–88	TRA Draria	Staoueli
15:00	Scoring by quarter: 14–23, 19–26, 22–20, 24–19
		Boxscore		Arena: Salle de Staouéli; Referees: Bouarifi, Ghaib, Fouchene

=== NA Hussein Dey vs. MC Alger ===
May 21, 2024	NA Hussein Dey	75–64	MC Alger	Blida
16:00	Scoring by quarter: 16–19, 28–19, 11–14, 20–12
		Boxscore		Arena: Hocine Chalane Arena; Referees: Larouci, Amrane, Ferhani

== Semi-finals ==
WO Boufarik offered itself the first ticket for the final of the Algerian Cup by defeating TRA Draria (67–59), at the Salle OMS Mohamed Kadiri in Rouïba, in a match counting for the first semi-final. In a remake of the 2022 final, TRA Draria failed to take revenge. Double defending champion, WO Boufarik once again managed to have the last word to reach its 3rd consecutive final. The second ticket for the final of the Algerian Cup went to USM Alger. The Rouge et Noir successfully advanced to the semi-finals after defeating NA Hussein Dey (59–41). USM Alger reaches the final for the first time since 1996 and is looking for the first title in its history in the Algerian Cup.

June 13, 2024	WO Boufarik	67–59	TRA Draria	Rouïba
17:00	Scoring by quarter: 22–22, 15–8, 13–19, 17–10
		Boxscore		Arena: Salle OMS Mohamed Kadiri; Referees: Si Youcef, Bouarifi, Amrane

June 14, 2024	USM Alger	59–41	NA Hussein Dey	Rouïba
17:00	Scoring by quarter: 18–14, 16–11, 12–8, 13–8
		Boxscore		Arena: Salle OMS Mohamed Kadiri; Referees: Larouci, Zahaf, Ainouz

== Final ==
USM Alger won the 53rd edition of the Algerian Basketball Cup, beating WO Boufarik, two-time holder of the trophy, with a score of (71–69). The “Rouge et Noir”, champions of Algeria in 2023, thus manage to win their first Algerian Basketball Cup in the history of the Algerian club, after the failure of their first attempt which dates back to the 1989 edition, lost against MC Alger (66–77). However, the WOB entered this final as favorite, having notably beaten USMA three times this season in the Super-Division (first leg: 78–63), (Second leg: 83–65) and (play -off: 85–78).

July 17, 2024	WO Boufarik	69–71	USM Alger	Algiers
17:00	Scoring by quarter: 11–25, 11–20, 21–18, 26–8
TV2, TV6	Pts: Abdellah Hamdani 26; Rebs: Achache 9 Asts: Kaouane 6	Boxscore	Pts: Guezout 15; Rebs: Messaoudi 7 Asts: Bougria 6	Arena: La Coupole d'Alger Arena; Referees: Sofiane Hammada, Anis Bennani, Sofiane Si Youcef

Starters:			Pts	Reb	Ast
	2	(Algeria) Lamouri Merahi	24	6	1
PG	6	(Algeria) Abdelhalim Kaouane	0	3	6
	7	(Algeria) Abdellah Hamdani	26	6	1
SG	23	(Algeria) Kadour Métidji	5	3	2
C	44	(Algeria) Rabah Zitoun	5	5	0
Reserves:					
	1	(Algeria) Tarek Hamdani	3	5	3
	9	(Algeria) Abdeldjalil Zidi	DNP		
C	10	(Algeria) Mohamed Seddik Touati	1	5	0
PG	11	(Algeria) Abdelhak Henna	3	2	2
	12	(Algeria) Zakaia Foughali	DNP		
	24	(Algeria) Mohamed Amairia	DNP		
SF	32	(Algeria) Cherif Djamel Eddine Achache	2	9	4
Head coach:
(Algerian Basketball Federation) Sofiane Boulahia

WO Boufarik	USM Alger

WO Boufarik	Statistics	USM Alger
20/37 (54.1%)	2-pt field goals	21/42 (50%)
4/31 (12.9%)	3-pt field goals	7/24 (29.2%)
17/32 (53.1%)	Free throws	8/16 (50%)
20	Offensive rebounds	15
27	Defensive rebounds	28
47	Total rebounds	43
19	Assists	16
19	Turnovers	22
	Steals	
3	Blocks	2
38	Fouls	40

Starters:			Pts	Reb	Ast
	5	(Algeria) Zakaria Guezout	15	5	3
	9	(Algeria) Moussa Bougria	10	3	6
	10	(Algeria) Bouhaous Messaoudi	4	7	2
	13	(Algeria) Lotfi Adrar	10	5	3
	21	(Algeria) Bassem Medjoubi	2	5	0
Reserves:					
F/C	0	(Algeria) Nabil Saidi	13	5	0
	1	(Algeria) Ramadane Belhadj	13	1	0
	4	(Algeria) Zakaria Khoudja	DNP		
	11	(Algeria) Tarek Redouane	4	6	2
	29	(Algeria) Abdelmounaim Sadouki	DNP		
	40	(Algeria) Adlene Toufik Adberrahim	0	0	0
SG	55	(Algeria) Merouane Yahya	DNP		
Head coach:
(Algerian Basketball Federation) Réda El Hachemi
