= WA Boufarik (basketball) =

Algerian basketball team

WO Boufarik
- Leagues: Algerian Basketball Championship
- Founded: 1945
- Arena: Moussa Chiraf Arena
- Capacity: 2,000
- Location: Boufarik, Algeria
- Team colors: Orange, White, Forest Green
- President: Redha Rait
- Head coach: Reda Hachemi
- Championships: 11 Algerian Leagues; 9 Algerian Cups
- Website: http://w-a-boufarik-basketball.webnode.fr/

Widad Olympic Boufarik, formerly Widad Adabi Boufarik, shortly WO Boufarik, is a basketball team belonging to a multi-sports club of the same name. Based in Boufarik, Algeria, WA Boufarik has historically been the nation's second-best team, after GS Pétroliers.

In total, WA Boufarik has won 18 titles. The team won its first title in the 1987 Cup of Algeria, winning the finals against NA Hussein Dey by one point (65–64). In the 1990s, the club won 12 titles, including five consecutive titles from 1990 to 1994 and four Algerian Cups. The club won its most recent league title during the 2001–02 season. In 2007, Widad played their last final against DRB Staouéli and lost 66–64.

== History ==
=== A New Golden Era for WO Boufarik ===
On June 11, 2022, twenty years after its last coronation, WO Boufarik won the Coupe fédérale by beating TRA Draria with a score of (74–60), winning on this occasion the eighth trophy of its history. A week after the disillusionment suffered in the final of the Super-Division Championship, WO Boufarik's players did not miss the opportunity to return to success after two decades of scarcity, offering a long-awaited trophy to their audience who came in droves to Hacène Harcha Arena. WO Boufarik retained for the 2nd consecutive year, the Algerian Basketball Cup trophy by beating CSC Gué de Constantine (74–63), in the final of the 52nd edition of the event contested at Hacène Harcha Arena, This is the 9th coronation of the WOB.

On July 2, 2024, In a demonstration of strength and mastery, WO Boufarik wrote a new page in its history by winning its tenth Super Division title. This consecration, which comes after more than two decades of waiting, materialized during the second leg of the Super-Division final played in Staouéli. Faced with a combative TRA Draria, but ultimately overwhelmed, Sofiane Boulahya's men imposed their diktat, winning a resounding victory with a clear score of (60–41).

== Trophies ==
=== National competitions ===
- Algerian Basketball Championship

Champions (11): 1990, 1991, 1992, 1993, 1994, 1997, 1998, 1999, 2002, 2024, 2026

- Algerian Cup

Champions (9): 1987, 1992, 1994, 1996, 1998, 2001, 200A, 2022, 2023

=== International competitions ===
- Arab Club Championship

Runners-up (1): 1998

== Roster (Men) ==
WO Boufarik roster
Players
Coaches

| Pos. | No. | Nat. | Name | Ht. | Wt. | Age |
|---|---|---|---|---|---|---|
| PG | 1 | (Algeria) | Hamdani, Tarek | 1.94 m (6 ft 4 in) | 88 kg (194 lb) | 31 – 7 January 1995 |
| PG | 6 | (Algeria) | Kaouane, Abdelhalim | 1.78 m (5 ft 10 in) | 78 kg (172 lb) | 44 – 29 November 1981 |
| SF | 7 | (Algeria) | Souici, Zineddine | 1.82 m (6 ft 0 in) | 80 kg (176 lb) |
| PG | 8 | (Algeria) | Bachouche, Adel | 1.87 m (6 ft 2 in) | 80 kg (176 lb) | 21 – 26 December 2004 |
| PG | 9 | (Algeria) | Benamghar, Mohamed Ali | 1.80 m (5 ft 11 in) | 71 kg (157 lb) | 18 – 5 August 2008 |
| PG | 11 | (Algeria) | Henna, Abdelhak | 1.89 m (6 ft 2 in) | 80 kg (176 lb) | 27 – 11 August 1999 |
| G/F | 12 | (Algeria) | Foughali, Zakaria | 1.92 m (6 ft 4 in) | 80 kg (176 lb) | 20 – 31 January 2006 |
| G | 14 | (Algeria) | Chebel, Louai Abd El Basset | 1.99 m (6 ft 6 in) | 92 kg (203 lb) | 28 – 29 January 1998 |
| F | 21 | (Algeria) | Mouaci, Akram | 1.95 m (6 ft 5 in) | 80 kg (176 lb) | 18 – 19 May 2008 |
| PF | 23 | (Algeria) | Mitidji, Kadour | 1.90 m (6 ft 3 in) | 88 kg (194 lb) | 28 – 10 August 1998 |
| C | 24 | (Algeria) | Salhi, Ahmed | 2.08 m (6 ft 10 in) | 96 kg (212 lb) | 24 – 21 November 2001 |
| G | 32 | (Algeria) | Achache Cherif, Djamel Eddine Anouar | 1.98 m (6 ft 6 in) | 80 kg (176 lb) | 36 – 30 October 1989 |
| C | 44 | (Algeria) | Zitoun, Rabah | 2.11 m (6 ft 11 in) | 95 kg (209 lb) | 38 – 3 September 1988 |
| G/F | 45 | (Algeria) | Messad, Ali Mohamed | 1.98 m (6 ft 6 in) | 85 kg (187 lb) | 37 – 31 August 1989 |
| F | 55 | (Democratic Republic of the Congo) | Ekamba, Exause Moke | | | 21 – 3 July 2005 |
| PF | 99 | (Algeria) | Sahraoui, Mohamed Akram | 1.93 m (6 ft 4 in) | 86 kg (190 lb) | 30 – 15 August 1996 |

Head coach

- (Algeria) Reda Hachemi

Assistant coach(es)

- (Algeria) Samir Mehnaoui

Legend

- (C) Team captain
- (I) Import player
- Injured

- Roster
Updated: April 1, 2026

== Statistics ==
=== Season by season ===
| Season | Regular season | | | | | | Playoffs | Algerian Cup | Super Cup | International | | |
| Season | Division | Pos | Pts | P | W | L | Playoffs | Algerian Cup | Super Cup | International | | |
|---|---|---|---|---|---|---|---|---|---|---|---|---|
| 1989–90 | Super Division A | 1st | | | | | | | | | | |
| 1990–91 | Super Division A | 1st | | | | | | Quarterfinalist | | | | |
| 1991–92 | Super Division A | 1st | | | | | | Winners | | | | |
| 1992–93 | Super Division A | 1st | | | | | | | | | | |
| 1993–94 | Super Division A | 1st | | | | | | Winners | | | | |
| 1994–95 | Super Division A | | | | | | | | | | | |
| 1995–96 | Super Division A | 5th | | 18 | | | Runner-up | Winners | | | | |
| 1996–97 | Super Division A | 2nd | 28 | 16 | 12 | 4 | Champion | Semifinalist | | | | |
| 1997–98 | Super Division A | 1st | 36 | 18 | 18 | 0 | Champion | Winners | Winners | | | |
| 1998–99 | Super Division A | | | | | | Champion | Runner-up | | Arab Club Championship | RU | |
| 1999–00 | Super Division A | 3rd | 39 | 22 | 17 | 5 | | | | | | |
| 2000–01 | Super Division A | | | | | | | Winners | | | | |
| 2001–02 | Super Division A | 1st | | | | | | Winners | | | | |
| 2002–03 | Super Division A | | | | | | | | | | | |
| 2003–04 | Super Division A | | | | | | | | | | | |
| 2004–05 | Super Division A | RU | | | | | | Runner-up | | | | |
| 2005–06 | Super Division A | RU | | | | | | | | | | |
| 2006–07 | Super Division A | | | | | | | Runner-up | | | | |
| 2007–08 | Super Division A | 4th | 42 | 26 | 16 | 10 | | | | | | |
| 2008–09 | Super Division A | 3rd | 18 | 11 | 7 | 4 | | Quarterfinalist | | | | |
| 2009–10 | Super Division A | 2nd | 21 | 12 | 9 | 3 | 3rd | ? | | | | |
| 2010–11 | Super Division A | 3rd | 55 | 30 | 25 | 5 | 3rd | Semifinalist | | | | |
| 2011–12 | Super Division A | 3rd | 54 | 30 | 24 | 6 | —N/a | Round of 16 | | | | |
| 2012–13 | Super Division A | 2nd | 31 | 18 | 13 | 5 | 7th | Round of 32 | | | | |
| 2013–14 | Super Division A | 8th | 22 | 18 | 4 | 14 | Not qualify | Round of 32 | | | | |
| 2014–15 | Super Division A | 12nd | 28 | 24 | 6 | 18 | Not qualify | ? | | | | |
| 2015–16 | Super Division A | 9th | 37 | 26 | 11 | 15 | Not qualify | ? | | | | |
| 2016–17 | Super Division A | 3rd | 17 | 10 | 7 | 3 | Not qualify | Round of 16 | | | | |
| 2017–18 | National 1 | 5th | 49 | 30 | 20 | 10 | 5th | | | | | |
| 2018–19 | National 1 | | | | | | Semi-finals | | | | | |
| 2019–20 | National 1 | Canceled (Note: On March 15, 2020, the Ministry of Youth and Sports decided to stop the season due to the COVID-19 pandemic in Algeria.) | | | | | | | | | | |
| 2020–21 | National 1 | Canceled | | | | | | | | | | |
| 2021–22 | Super Division | 1st | 16 | 8 | 8 | 0 | Runner-up | Winners (Note: The Algerian Basketball Federation (FABB) decided to cancel the Algerian Cup for this season and replace it with the Coupe Fédérale, in which only the 20 teams in the Super Division competed.) | | Arab Club Championship | QR | 2–2 |
| 2022–23 | Super Division | 1st | 30 | 16 | 14 | 2 | Runner-up | Winners | | Arab Club Championship | R16 | 0–4 |
| 2023–24 | Super Division | 1st | 56 | 30 | 26 | 4 | Champion | Runner-up | | | | |
| 2024–25 | Super Division | 2nd | 47 | 26 | 21 | 5 | Semi-finals | Semi-finals | Winners | | | |
| 2025–26 | Super Division | 2nd | 43 | 26 | 17 | 9 | Champion | Semi-finals | | | | |
