= USM Alger (basketball) =

- 2026–27 USM Alger basketball season
- Leagues: Super Division
- Founded: 1942
- Arena: Salle OMS Mourad Boukechoura, Raïs Hamidou
- Location: 2, avenue Ziar Abdelkader Bab El Oued; Algiers, Algeria
- Team colors: Black, Red
- President: Fouad Djabrouni
- Head coach: Maamar Berriche
- Championships: 4 Men's Championship; 1 Men's Cup; 3 Women's Championship; 3 Women's Cup

Union sportive de la médina d'Alger (basketball) (Arabic: الإتحاد الرياضي لمدينة الجزائر لكرة السلة), , commonly known as USMA, is a professional basketball club based in Algiers, Algeria. The team competes in the Algerian Basketball Championship and forms part of the larger multi-sports club USM Alger, which is more widely known for its football section. USMA has both men’s and women’s basketball teams with a long history of domestic success, the team founded in 1942.

USMA has a long history of domestic success in basketball, winning multiple championships and cups for both men and women. The men's team dominated the Algerian Basketball Championship during the 1960s, winning multiple league titles. Recently, the team returned to prominence by winning the Super Division in 2022–23 and claiming its first Algerian Basketball Cup in 2023–24.

The women's team has been a leading team from the late 1960s through the 1990s, winning multiple Championships and cups. The team continues to compete at a high level in recent seasons. As reigning 2022–23 champions, USM Alger made their first appearance in an international competition at the 2023 Arab Club Basketball Championship, reaching the quarter-finals before being eliminated by Beirut Club.

== History ==
=== Foundation and early years ===
One of the lineups for the 1949-50 season. Standing from left: Benhaddad, Abdelkader Omrani (President), Zermi (Coach), Sahnoun, Jaadoun, Ammari, Mokhtar Taleb, Hamada, Afftouche, Haddad. Seated from left: Bahriz, Boulenjas, Khiar, Houbi, Chiha.

On August 22, 1947, USM Alger inaugurated the new headquarters and multi-sports hall.

USM Alger expanded beyond football in its early years by opening divisions for other sports such as boxing, basketball, and cycling. These activities continued thanks to the dedication of key figures like Abdelkader Omrani, Mohamed Abdelhamid, and Abdelkader Cherchari. On August 22, 1947, USM Alger officially inaugurated its new headquarters and multi-sports hall located at 5, rue de Bône (Algiers). The ceremony was attended by many personalities, as well as club officials and honorary members. The large complex included several physical training rooms equipped with changing rooms and showers, a basketball court, a boxing ring, a gymnastics hall, and areas for medical care. The upper floor housed offices and meeting rooms. L'Écho d'Alger reported the words of club leader Mohamed Zenagui, who declared: “The Union’s projects will not stop here, we will continue along the path we have set, inch’Allah.”

On February 17, 1952, Mohamed Taleb, a leader of the Mouvement pour le triomphe des libertés démocratiques (MTLD), passed away after a long illness, causing deep emotion throughout Algeria. His funeral in Algiers brought together several thousand people, including political leaders, associations, and sports representatives. At El Kettar Cemetery, Sheikh Abdelkrim, on behalf of the MTLD leadership, paid a final tribute to Taleb, highlighting his life, political commitment, and activism. In addition, Taleb was the president and founder of the USM Alger basketball section, contributing to the club’s development and its national role during the colonial period.

In 1956, the central leadership of the National Liberation Front (FLN) decided to halt all sporting activities involving Muslim clubs, as part of the broader political strategy during the Algerian War of Independence. A meeting was held at the USMA clubhouse on Rue de Bône to formalize the cessation of football activities. The meeting was chaired by Ali Cherifi, USMA vice-president and financial officer of the Zone autonome d'Alger (ZAA). Notably, two senior officials of the ZAA were affiliated with USMA. Among them was Muhammad Hattab, better known as Habib Reda, a USMA basketball player who also led the FLN’s bomb network and was later sentenced to death. On January 15, 1957, USM Alger officially ceased participation in all championships due to the Algerian War. The French Federation of Basketball confirmed this decision in its official publication.

=== Post-independence basketball achievements ===
During the 1960s, USM Alger established itself as one of the top basketball teams in Algeria. In the years following independence, the club built a talented and cohesive squad that would leave its mark on the national championship. Between 1965 and 1969, USMA won several Algerian league titles, impressing with their solid teamwork and strong defense. Led by standout players such as Houbi, Lamari, Zenir, Bonischot, and Chaour, the team dominated its rivals on the court. The championship victory in 1968–69 confirmed USMA’s supremacy in Algerian basketball during that period, extending a winning run that began in the mid-1960s. This era remains one of the golden chapters in the club’s basketball history.

Throughout the decades, the Algerian Basketball Cup has been the stage for several notable moments in USM Alger’s basketball history. Although the team was often among the country’s top competitors, its journey in the cup finals featured a few difficult chapters. In the 1988–89 season, USMA reached the final after a strong campaign, but fell short against MC Alger, finishing as runners-up. The story repeated in 1995–96, with another trip to the final, only to be defeated by the renowned WA Boufarik.

In the league, however, the club’s performances were more modest, spending several seasons in Division 2 and struggling to maintain a consistent presence among the elite teams of the national championship. Despite these challenges, USM Alger has maintained its place in the Algerian basketball scene, drawing on its rich legacy particularly during the golden periods of the 1960s and 1980s, when the team reached its highest levels domestically.

The USM Alger women's basketball team established itself, particularly during the 1980s and early 1990s, as one of Algeria’s top clubs in women’s basketball. The team won the National 1 Championship three times in 1969, 1986, and 1991. USMA’s women’s team also lifted the Algerian Cup twice, in 1979 and 1986, while reaching the final on several occasions during the 1990s. This era was marked by a talented generation of players who helped build the club’s reputation in Algerian women’s basketball. Even years later, this record remains a key chapter in the history of the USM Alger women’s section.

In the 2016–17 season, USM Alger returned to Super Division A after finishing first in the promotion playoffs. The group included ESB Ouargla, MC Saida, and OS Bordj Bou Arréridj. Under the guidance of young coach Reda Saiak, the Red and Black topped the playoff standings, earning a return to the elite division four years after their relegation.

=== USM Alger returns to the podium ===
On November 4, 2018, MADAR Holding appointed Saïd Allik as President of the Club Sportif Amateur (CSA) of USM Alger, while he was still serving as the sporting director of CR Belouizdad. The decision sparked criticism from USMA supporters, many of whom opposed Allik's return after his 25-year presidency and called for his resignation. Despite the backlash, Allik refused to step down.

On December 20, 2020, during the elective general assembly, Allik was re-elected for a new four-year Olympic term as head of CSA/USMA. The previous term concluded with an ordinary general assembly, during which both the moral and financial reports were unanimously approved. Although he had considered stepping away from the sporting scene, Allik was urged by athletes from various sections of the club, including basketball, to continue his leadership.

On June 10, 2023, USM Alger ended a 54-year title drought by winning the Algerian Basketball Championship at the Hamou Boutlélis Sports Palace in Oran. The team secured the title by defeating WO Boufarik in the final match of the playoff tournament. Technical director Khaled Berkani hailed the achievement, emphasizing the significance of ending more than five decades without a championship. “The credit goes to the players and the coach above all,” he stated.

On August 7, 2023, the CSA submitted an application to the Institut National Algérien de la Propriété Industrielle (INAPI) to register a new logo for the club. This move was made to comply with a court ruling requiring the removal of the city of Algiers' symbol from the logo. In parallel, CSA president Saïd Allik filed a complaint against the Société Sportive par Actions (SSPA) for using what he described as a "fake" version of the club's logo. That same year, USM Alger made its debut in the Arab Club Basketball Championship, held in Qatar. The club bolstered its roster by signing American player George Williams. USMA advanced to the quarter-finals, where they were eliminated by Lebanese side Dynamo.

On February 5, 2024, the Algerian Olympic and Sports Committee announced that USM Alger player Faredj Messaoudi had signed a professional contract with a team in the Japanese 3x3 Basketball League, becoming the first Algerian to turn professional in that discipline. On July 17, 2024, USM Alger won the 53rd edition of the Algerian Basketball Cup, defeating WO Boufarik two time defending champions by a score of 71–69. This marked the club’s first ever Algerian Cup title in men’s basketball, after previously falling short in the 1989 final against MC Alger (66–77).

=== New leadership, new challenges, new opportunities ===
Following the decision of Saïd Allik not to seek another term, a significant transition took place within USM Alger’s Club Sportif Amateur (CSA). After over 30 years at the helm, Allik expressed his desire to pass the torch and give an opportunity to new leadership. On September 18, 2024, Djabrouni Fouad, a long-time member of the club’s judo section, was elected as the new president of CSA/USMA. Djabrouni won the vote with 16 out of 24 ballots cast, defeating the other candidate, treasurer Khebaz Hamid, who received 7 votes. Meanwhile, on January 31, 2024, the Algerian Basketball Federation (FABB) announced the scheduling of the Basketball Super Cup match. The game was set for February 11, 2025, at La Coupole d'Alger Arena, and featured a clash between WO Boufarik, reigning Super Division champions, and USM Alger, winners of the Algerian Cup. In the match, WO Boufarik emerged victorious, defeating USM Alger with a score of 70–59.

Finishing as runners-up in both the National 1 and the Algerian Cup, USM Alger's women's basketball team reached the finals of both competitions in the 2025 season. In the National 1, USMA lost in the finals against reigning champions GS Cosider, falling in both legs: 57–67 at home and 48–66 at the Salle OMS de Staouéli. A few days later, USM Alger contested the Algerian Cup final against Hussein-Dey Marines and were defeated 39–45.

USM Alger the defending Algerian Cup champions did not retain retain the trophy, losing 59–46 to the crowned 2025 Algerian champions, NB Staouéli in the final of the 54th edition of the 2024–25 Algerian Basketball Cup. Despite the defeat, the younger USMA side, which has a strong legacy in Algerian basketball and the 2024 Algerian Cup crown. Fielded a fresh squad under the club’s current rebuilding phase, USMA relied on several emerging prospects, including 2.16m (7'1") center Faredj Messaoudi, who led the team’s efforts on the court. Messaoudi is considered to have great potential largely due to his height. The match played in a charged atmosphere at the Coupole of the Mohamed Boudiaf Olympic Complex, and drew a record crowd, with the USMA supporters showing major support for their young squad throughout the contest.

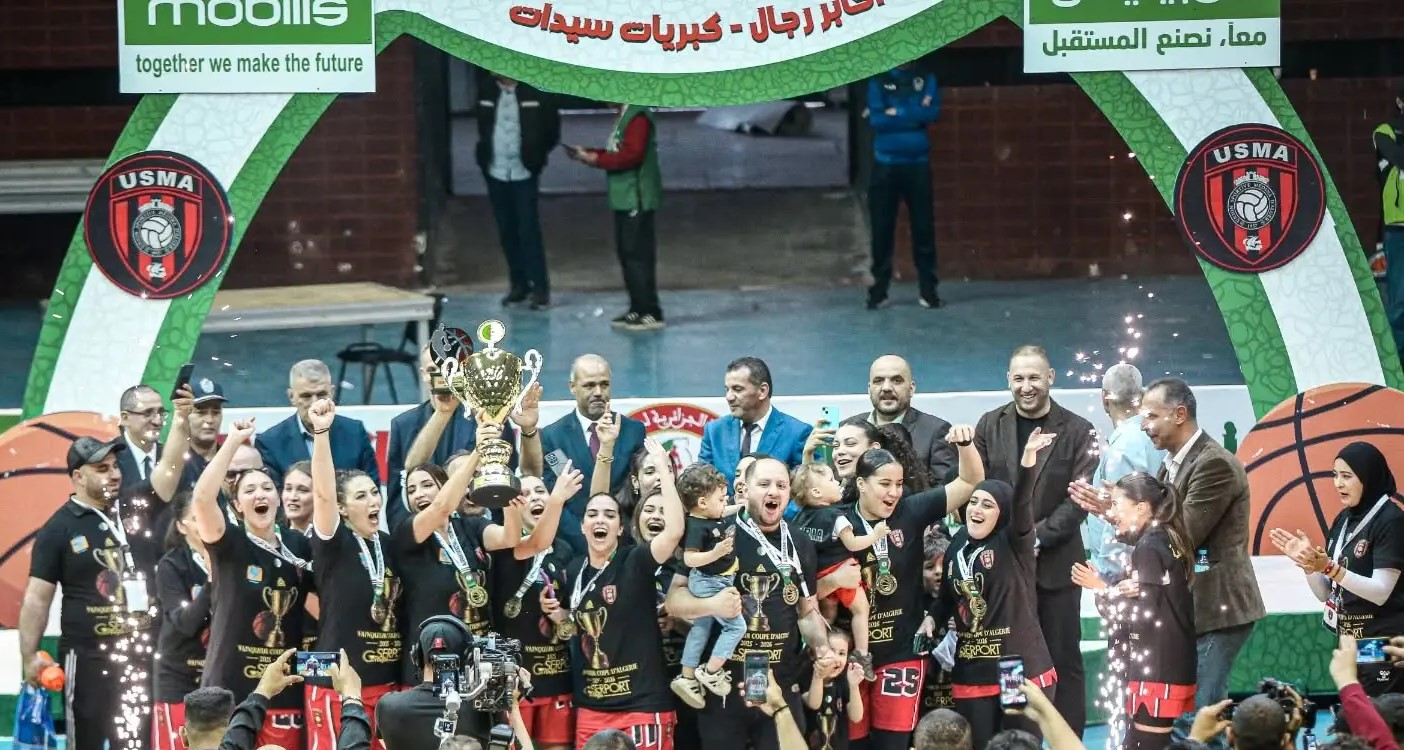
USM Alger women's basketball team wins the 2026 Algerian Cup.

On 15 May 2026, USM Alger won the Algerian Women's Basketball Cup after defeating MC Alger 63–57. Trailing 33–26 at halftime, USMA staged a strong comeback in the second half, led by Yahou Hadjer and Reguig Neyla with 18 points each. The victory secured USMA’s third Algerian Cup title and their first since 1986.

== Roster (Men) ==
=== Super Division roster ===
Note: Flags indicate national team eligibility at FIBA-sanctioned events. Players may hold other non-FIBA nationalities not displayed.

USM Alger roster
Players
Coaches

Pos.	No.	Nat.	Name	Ht.	Wt.	Age
SF	1	(Algeria)	Belhadj, Ramadane	1.70 m (5 ft 7 in)	65 kg (143 lb)	31 – 5 April 1995
SG	2	(Algeria)	Koroghli, Mohamed	1.82 m (6 ft 0 in)	78 kg (172 lb)	20 – 20 April 2006
SF	3	(Algeria)	Zidi, Abdeldjalil	1.85 m (6 ft 1 in)	80 kg (176 lb)	20 – 20 May 2006
PG	4	(Algeria)	Khoudja, Zakaria	1.85 m (6 ft 1 in)	75 kg (165 lb)	21 – 10 May 2005
SG	7	(Algeria)	Fodil, Ilyes	1.80 m (5 ft 11 in)	75 kg (165 lb)	21 – 4 April 2005
SG	8	(Algeria)	Boutiba, Ahmed	1.94 m (6 ft 4 in)	85 kg (187 lb)	30 – 22 December 1995
PG	10	(Algeria)	Messaoudi, Bouhaous	1.88 m (6 ft 2 in)	90 kg (198 lb)	38 – 20 September 1988
PF	11	(Algeria)	Redouane, Tarek	2.00 m (6 ft 7 in)	85 kg (187 lb)	33 – 11 April 1993
SG	15	(Algeria)	Mimouni, Redouane	1.86 m (6 ft 1 in)	80 kg (176 lb)	39 – 23 August 1987
C	19	(Algeria)	Zaim, Mehdi	2.07 m (6 ft 9 in)	98 kg (216 lb)	23 – 1 September 2003
SG	21	(Algeria)	Medjoubi, Bacim	1.88 m (6 ft 2 in)	75 kg (165 lb)	24 – 20 October 2001
PF	24	(Algeria)	Guezout, Zakaria	2.00 m (6 ft 7 in)	87 kg (192 lb)	34 – 30 July 1992
C	99	(Algeria)	Rahmouni, Abdesselem	1.75 m (5 ft 9 in)	70 kg (154 lb)	19 – 8 October 2006
PF		(Algeria)	Bougria, Moussa	1.85 m (6 ft 1 in)	86 kg (190 lb)	33 – 20 January 1993
PF		(Algeria)	Lakeb, Riadh	1.93 m (6 ft 4 in)	60 kg (132 lb)	20 – 27 March 2006
PF		(Algeria)	Chaid, Badreddine (C)	1.87 m (6 ft 2 in)	74 kg (163 lb)	23 – 17 April 2003
C		(Algeria)	Messaoudi, Faredj	2.15 m (7 ft 1 in)	105 kg (231 lb)	23 – 20 January 2003

Head coach

- (Algeria) Maamar Berriche

Assistant coach(es)

- (Algeria) Nassim Djabour

Legend

- (C) Team captain
- (I) Import player
- Injured

- Roster
Updated: September 25, 2026

== Roster (Women) ==
=== National 1 roster ===
Note: Flags indicate national team eligibility at FIBA-sanctioned events. Players may hold other non-FIBA nationalities not displayed.

USM Alger roster
Players
Coaches

Pos.	No.	Nat.	Name	Ht.	Wt.	Age
PG	2	(Algeria)	Yahou, Hadjer	1.65 m (5 ft 5 in)		21 – 25 June 2005
SG	3	(Algeria)	Nadhri, Sabrina
G	4	(Algeria)	Fantazi, Radia			34 – 10 August 1992
PF	7	(Algeria)	Benani, Souad
SG	8	(Algeria)	Gharsalah, Yasmin
PG	9	(Algeria)	Adjab, Nawal
PF	11	(Algeria)	Allik, Simine
	13	(Algeria)	Reguig, Neyla (C)	1.85 m (6 ft 1 in)		29 – 11 February 1997
PF	17	(Algeria)	Chikirou, Hanane
G	20	(Algeria)	Ahmin, Meriam	1.80 m (5 ft 11 in)		21 – 20 June 2005
G/F	25	(Algeria)	Meskine, Maria Cerine	1.75 m (5 ft 9 in)		19 – 25 February 2007
	66	(Algeria)	Kardi, Raja Cyrine

Head coach

- (Algeria) Rachida Belaidi

Legend

- (C) Team captain
- (I) Import player
- Injured

- Roster
Updated: May 15, 2026

== Statistics ==
=== Season by season ===
Season	Regular season						Playoffs	Algerian Cup	Super Cup	International		
Season	Division	Pos	Pts	P	W	L	Playoffs	Algerian Cup	Super Cup	International		
1965–66	Super Division A	1st					—N/a	—N/a				
1966–67	Super Division A	1st					—N/a	—N/a				
1968–69	Super Division A	1st					—N/a					
1985–86	Super Division A							Round of 16				
1986–87	Super Division A							Semi-finals				
1987–88	Super Division A							Semi-finals				
1988–89	Super Division A							Runner-up				
1990–91	Super Division A							Quarter-finals				
1992–93	Super Division A							Round of 16				
1993–94	Super Division A							Round of 16				
1995–96	Super Division A						Semi-finals	Runner-up				
1996–97	Super Division A	6th	23	16	7	9	Quarter-finals	Semi-finals				
1997–98	Super Division A	8th	21	18	3	15	Not qualify	Quarter-finals				
1998–99	Super Division A		0	0	0	0						
1999–00	Super Division A	12th	23	18	1	21	Not qualify					
Between 2000–01 and 2009–10, USM Alger played in the second division
2010–11	Super Division A	11th	40	30	10	20	Not qualify	Round of 16				
2011–12	Super Division B		0	0	0	0	—N/a	Quarter-finals				
2012–13	Super Division A	5th	26	18	8	10	Not qualify	Round of 16				
2013–14	Super Division B	6th	23	16	7	9	—N/a	Round of 64				
2014–15	Super Division B		0	0	0	0	—N/a	Round of 16				
2015–16	Super Division B	3rd	26	14	12	2	—N/a	Quarter-finals				
2016–17	Super Division B	2nd	18	10	8	2	1st	Round of 32				
2017–18	National 1	10th	46	30	16	14	Not qualify	Round of 32				
2018–19	National 1	7th	24	16	8	8	Not qualify					
2019–20	National 1	Canceled (Note: On March 15, 2020, the Ministry of Youth and Sports decided to stop the season due to the COVID-19 pandemic in Algeria.)										
2020–21	National 1	Canceled										
2021–22	Super Division	4th	10	8	2	6	Not qualify	Quarter-finals (Note: The Algerian Basketball Federation (FABB) has decided, exceptionally, to cancel the Algerian Cup for the 2021–22 season and replace it with a Coupe fédérale which only concerns the 20 teams in the Super Division.)				
2022–23	Super Division	4th	26	16	10	6	1st					
2023–24	Super Division	4th	50	30	20	10	5th	Winners		Arab Club Championship	QF	4–2
2024–25	Super Division	9th	38	26	13	13	Not qualify	Runner-up	Runner-up			
2025–26	Super Division	4th	42	26	16	10	Semi-finals	Quarter-finals				
2026–27	Super Division							Quarter-finals				

== Notable players ==
Note: Flags indicate national team eligibility at FIBA-sanctioned events. Players may hold other non-FIBA nationalities not displayed.

Criteria

To appear in this section a player must have either:

- Set a club record or won an individual award while at the club
- Played at least one official international match for their national team at any time
- Played at least one official NBA match at any time.

- (Algeria) Abdesslem Dekkiche
- (Algeria) Faredj Messaoudi
- (Algeria) Nabil Saidi
- (United States) George Williams

== Honours ==
=== Men's ===
- Algerian Basketball Championship

Champion (4): 1965–66, 1966–67, 1968–69, 2022–23

- Algerian Basketball Cup

Winners (1): 2023–24
Runner-up (3): 1988–89, 1995-96, 2024–25

- Algerian Basketball Super Cup

Runner-up (1): 2025

=== Women's ===
- Algerian Women's Basketball Championship

Champion (3): 1968–69, 1985–86, 1990–91
Runner-up (1): 2024–25

Winners (3): 1978–79, 1985–86, 2025–26
Runner-up (6): 1983–84, 1989-90, 1990-91, 1992-93, 1993-94, 2024–25

== Shirt sponsor & kit manufacturer ==
- Groupe SERPORT
- Sonelgaz
- CNEP Banque

== National Liberation War ==
USM Alger contributed the most Chouhada of the Algerian War out of all Algerian football clubs, including captain Allel Oukid, head of the 4th region of Wilaya IV, as well as Mohamed Arezki Bennacer, head of the 3rd region of the ZAA and leader of the bomb network.

List of USM Alger basketball martyrs
1 Noureddine Benkanoune	2 Mohamed Tazairte	3 Hocine Asla	4 Hamada Hachlaf
5 Omar Sahnoune	6 Mohamed Boulenjas	7 Mahmoud Louchal	8 Amar Taleb
