= Faredj Messaoudi =

Algerian basketball player (2003)

No. 26 – USM Alger
- Position: Center
- League: Super Division

Personal information
- Born: 20 January 2003 (age 23) Algiers, Algeria
- Listed height: 7 ft 1 in (2.16 m)
- Listed weight: 231 lb (105 kg)

Career history
- 2022–2024: USM Alger
- 2024: Shonan Sesaside
- 2024–: USM Alger

Career highlights
- Algerian League champions (2023)

Faredj Messaoudi (born 20 January 2003) is an Algerian professional basketball player who plays for USM Alger. Messaoudi also played for the Algeria national basketball team. Standing at 2.16 m (7 ft 1 in), he plays as center.

== History ==
=== Shonan Sesaside ===
It’s exciting also to get that chance to go to Japan. I am grateful for this opportunity to grow within this league and I’m looking forward to developing my game even further. I am sure that it’s amazing to play over there. It’s going to be fantastic !.

— Faredj Messaoudi’s statement about his experience in Japan.

On February 5, 2024, the official page of the Algerian Olympic and Sports Committee announced that USM Alger player Faradj Messouadi had signed a professional contract in the Japanese 3x3 Basketball League, becoming the first Algerian to obtain a professional contract in this sport. Iwata General Manager commented that with his smooth movements that do not reveal his height of 215 cm, he is expected to be active in attack and defense. Although Messaoudi is still a young player, he plays an active role in the Algerian national team in 3x3, so he is sure that he will bring a new breath to the team.

== Super Division career statistics ==
As of 21 February 2026

Year	Team	GP	GS	MPG	FG%	3P%	FT%	RPG	APG	SPG	BPG	PPG
2025–26	USM Alger	11	4	17:38	54.7 %	28.6 %	50 %	6.9	0.5	0.4	1.5	8.6
Career		11	4	17:38	54.7 %	28.6 %	50 %	6.9	0.5	0.4	1.5	8.6

Source: afrobasket

== Honours ==
=== Club ===
USM Alger

- Super Division: 2022–23
