= Boukadir =

- Commune and town
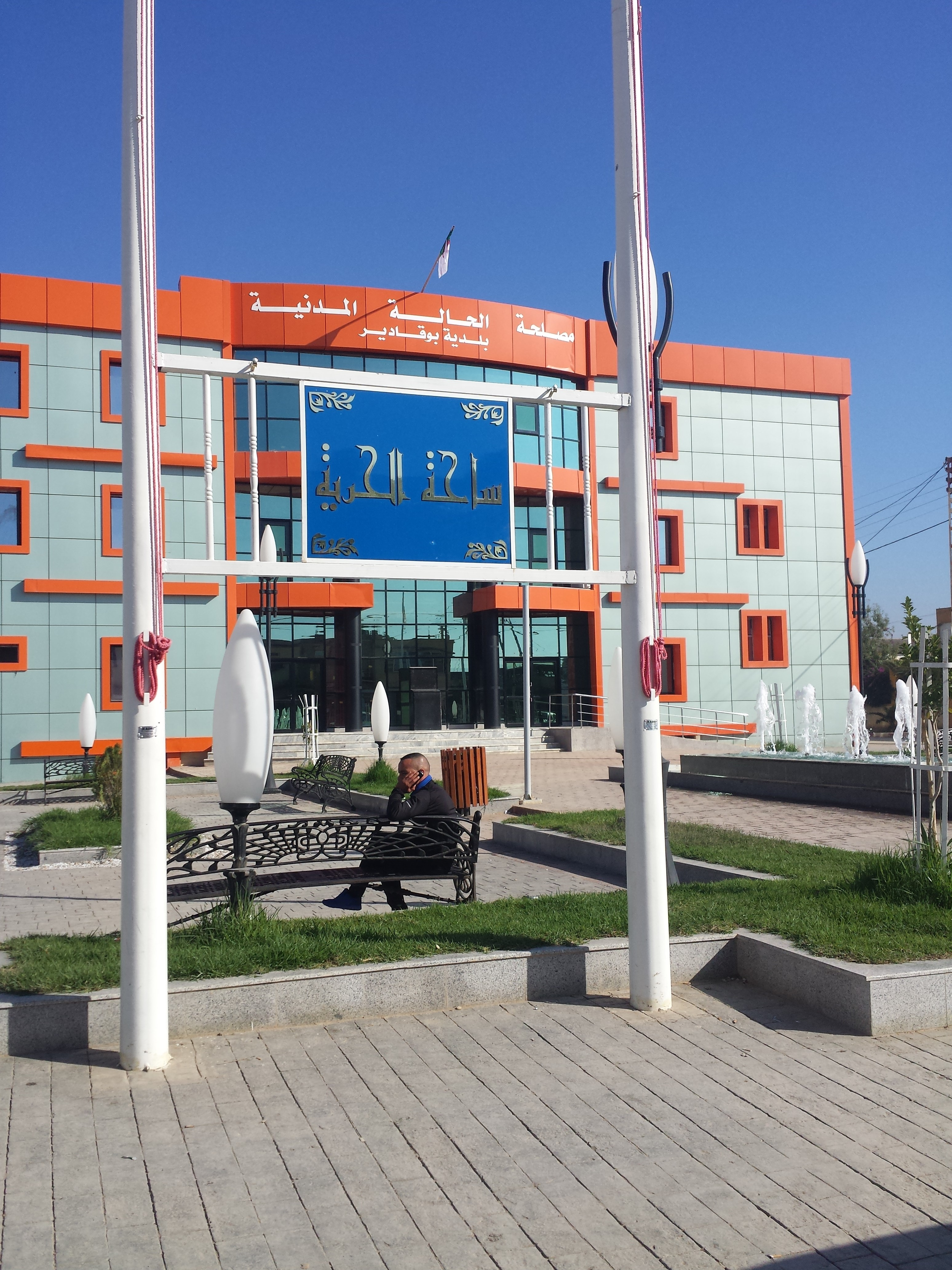
- Town hall of Boukadir

- Location within Algeria
- Coordinates: 36°04′N 1°08′E
- Country: Algeria
- Province: Chlef Province
- District: Boukadir

Area
  - Total: 87 sq mi (225 km^{2})

Population (2008)
  - Total: 51,340
- Time zone: UTC+1 (CET)

Boukadir is a town and commune in Chlef Province, Algeria. According to the 1998 census it has a population of 41,655.

The town of Boukadir extends 225 km ² of flat semi arid forest. It has 95% Electrification and 33% Natural Gases.
