= Raïs Hamidou, Algeria =

Raïs Hamidou الرايس حميدو
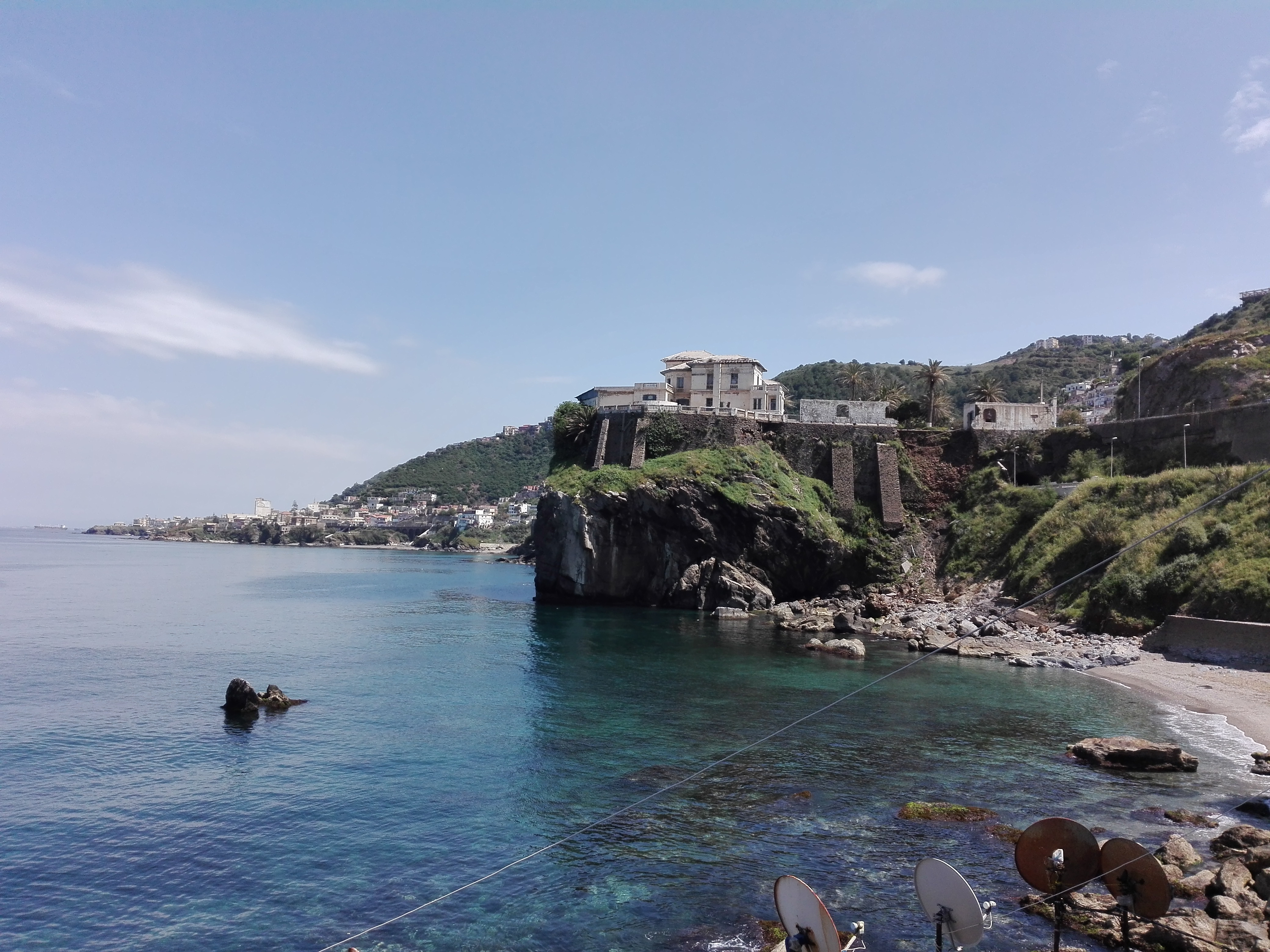
- Interactive map of Raïs Hamidou الرايس حميدو
- Coordinates: 36°49′03″N 3°00′41″E
- Country: Algeria
- Province: Algiers

Area
  - Total: 4.76 km^{2} (1.84 sq mi)
- Highest elevation: 351 m (1,152 ft)
- Lowest elevation: 0 m (0 ft)

Population
  - Total: 30,000
- Time zone: UTC+1 (West Africa Time)
- Postal code: 16060

Raïs Hamidou is a suburb of the city of Algiers in northern Algeria.

== Notable people ==
- Rezki Zerarti, painter, artist
