= Abdelhalim Kaouane =

Algerian basketball player

No. 6 – Free agent
- Position: Point guard

Personal information
- Born: 29 November 1981 (age 44) Boufarik, Algeria
- Listed height: 5 ft 11 in (1.80 m)

Career history
- 2006–2010: Al-Nasr Benghazi
- 2010–2011: Al-Ahly Benghazi
- 2012–2016: CSM Constantine
- 2016–2019: GS Pétroliers

Career highlights
- Algerian League champions (2013)

Abdelhalim Kaouane (born 29 November 1981) is an Algerian professional basketball player. He has played for the Algeria national basketball team.

== Honours ==
=== Club ===
Al-Nasr Benghazi

- Libyan League : 2007. 2009
- Libyan Cup : 2009
- Libyan Super Cup : 2007

CSM Constantine

- Super Division: 2013.
