= Staouéli =

Staouéli سطوالي
- Municipality
- Commune of Staouéli
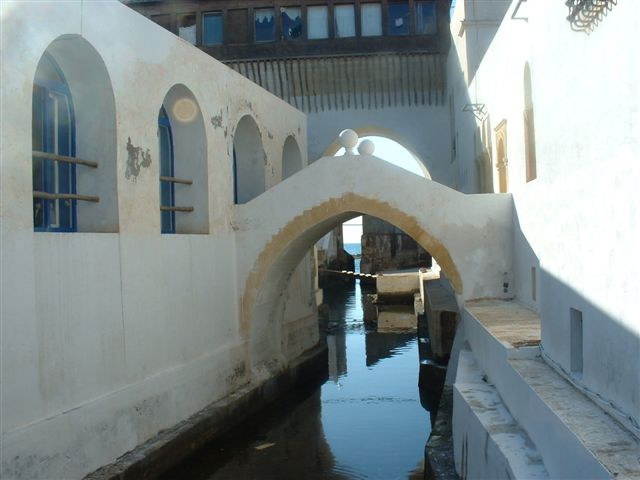
- Sidi Fredj resort

- Location of Staouéli within Algeria
- Coordinates: 36°45′N 2°53′E
- Country: Algeria
- Province: Algiers
- District: Zéralda

Government
  - PMA Seats: 11
  - PMA president: Tofik hrag (2021-2026)

Area
  - Total: 22.23 km^{2} (8.58 sq mi)

Population (1998)
  - Total: 38,915
  - Density: 1,751/km^{2} (4,534/sq mi)
- Time zone: UTC+01 (CET)
- Postal code: 16101
- ONS code: 1645

Staouéli is a municipality in Algiers Province, Algeria. It is located in Zéralda district, on a Presque-isle on the Mediterranean Sea, hosting the resort town of Sidi Fredj. There was a Grand Prix circuit located in Staouéli. Grands Prix was held there from 1928 to 1930, but the circuit is no longer operational.

== See also ==
- Battle of Staouéli
