= 2023–24 USM Alger basketball season =

USM Alger
2023–24 season
- President: (Algeria) Saïd Allik
- Head coach: (Algeria) Réda El Hachemi
- Arena: Salle OMS Mourad Boukechoura, Raïs Hamidou
- Super Division: 4th
- Playoffs: 5th
- Algerian Cup: Winners
- Arab Championship: Quarter-finals
- Biggest win: ASS Oum El Bouaghi 53–102 USM Alger (February 17, 2024)
- Biggest defeat: Al Ittihad Alexandria 89–53 USM Alger (October 2, 2023)

The 2023–24 season was USM Alger's 62nd in existence, their 5th consecutive season in the top flight of the Algerian basketball, USM Alger are participating in this season's editions of the Algerian Cup and the Arab Club Basketball Championship.

== Overview ==
USM Alger participated in the Arab Club Basketball Championship for the first time, where it fell into the Group B with Al Ittihad Alexandria, Al Ahli Doha of Qatar, Al-Seeb of Oman, and Dynamo Lebanon. On September 9, 2023, George Williams joined USM Alger and strengthened their roster to participate in this competition. USM Alger finished in second place with three victories and one defeat. USM Alger started the 35th edition of the Arab club championship very well by getting the best of Seib's (81–57), at the Al Gharafa hall in Doha, on the occasion of the first day of pool B. In the Round of 16 they met with Qatar Club and won after overtime, USMA started its match poorly, often finding itself trailing. The first half also ended with a ten-point lead in favor of the Qataris (35–25). Stopping the journey in the quarter-finals against Beirut Club. USM Alger benefited from the services of two players to participate in this tournament, namely Omar Belliche from NA Hussein Dey and Sidali Benzaime from Rouiba CB.

On October 18, 2023, The Ministry of Youth and Sports (MJS) announced that it was suspending all sport events "until further notice" in solidarity with the Palestinian people. The suspension was announced the day after a strike on a hospital in Gaza, which has been relentlessly shelling the Gaza Strip since the start of the Gaza war, sparked on October 7 by the bloody attack. of the Palestinian Islamist movement on its soil. On November 10, 2023, The first match in the Super Division was the derby against MC Alger where they won by three points (71–68) and the match was held without an audience in sympathy with Gaza. In a late match in the first round against ASS Oum El Bouaghi due to participation in the Arab Club Basketball Championship, USMA achieved a new victory with a score of 90–63, this consecutive victory propels the USMA players to sixth place in the ranking now totaling 4 points. The Super Division summit between the defending champion USM Alger and its runner-up WO Boufarik, after it was postponed several times finally took place in the Hacène Harcha Arena where USM Alger lost (78–63) after being ahead in the first two quarters, USM Alger with 12 points is positioned third sharing this place with USM Blida.

On February 5, 2024, the official page of the Algerian Olympic and Sports Committee announced that USM Alger player Faredj Messaoudi had signed a professional contract in the Japanese 3x3 Basketball League, becoming the first Algerian to obtain a professional contract in this sport. On February 17, 2024, in the first match in the second leg, USMA achieved its heaviest result since the beginning of the season after winning away from home in Oum El Bouaghi against the local team with a score of (102–53), keeping the club in third place, one point behind runner-up NB Staoueli. On May 8, 2024, the draw for the quarter-finals of the Algerian Cup was held, with USM Alger facing CSC Gué de Constantine in a match that take place in La Coupole d'Alger Arena. USM Alger qualified for the semi-finals, the USMA basketball players took charge of the match well, taking a 20-point lead in the first quarter (29–09), then (42–28) at half-time. In the second half, the Usmists managed their lead on the scoreboard (57–37) in the third quarter, before ending the match with a 15-point lead (73–58).

The first day of the first play-off tournament of the Super Division played in Staouéli. In this first match USM Alger was defeated by WO Boufarik (85–78). In the second match against NB Staouéli, l'USMA was defeated for the second time in a row (75–67), to reduce his chances of qualifying for the final and defending his title. On June 14, USM Alger qualified for the Algerian Cup final after winning against NA Hussein Dey (59–41), which was the first time they reached the final since 1996. In the second stage of the Playoffs in Boufarik, USM Alger failed to qualify for the final and defend its title, settling for fifth place. On July 17, USM Alger won the 53rd edition of the Algerian Basketball Cup, beating WO Boufarik, two-time holder of the trophy, with a score of (71–69). The "Rouge et Noir" thus manage to win their first Algerian Basketball Cup in the history, after the failure of their first attempt which dates back to the 1989 edition, lost against MC Alger (66–77).

== Players ==
=== Super Division roster ===
Note: Flags indicate national team eligibility at FIBA-sanctioned events. Players may hold other non-FIBA nationalities not displayed.

USM Alger roster
Players
Coaches

Pos.	No.	Nat.	Name	Ht.	Wt.	Age
C	0	(Algeria)	Saidi, Nabil (C)	2.00 m (6 ft 7 in)		43 – 13 March 1980
SF	1	(Algeria)	Belhadj, Ramadane	1.70 m (5 ft 7 in)		28 – 5 April 1995
PG	4	(Algeria)	Khoudja, Zakaria	1.82 m (6 ft 0 in)		18 – 10 May 2005
	5	(Algeria)	Guezout, Zakaria	2.00 m (6 ft 7 in)		31 – 30 July 1992
PF	9	(Algeria)	Bougria, Moussa	1.85 m (6 ft 1 in)		30 – 20 January 1993
PG	10	(Algeria)	Messaoudi, Bouhaous	1.88 m (6 ft 2 in)		35 – 20 September 1988
PF	11	(Algeria)	Redouane, Tarek	1.98 m (6 ft 6 in)		30 – 11 April 1993
G	13	(Algeria)	Adrar, Lotfi	1.99 m (6 ft 6 in)		40 – 13 August 1983
SG	21	(Algeria)	Medjoubi, Bacim	1.88 m (6 ft 2 in)		22 – 20 October 2001
PG	29	(Algeria)	Sadouki, Abdelmounaim
F	40	(Algeria)	Adberrahim, Adlene Toufik	1.88 m (6 ft 2 in)		19 – 16 February 2004
PF	55	(Algeria)	Yahya, Merouane	1.85 m (6 ft 1 in)		20 – 19 March 2003

Head coach

- (Algeria) Réda El Hachemi

Assistant coach(es)

- (Algeria) Nassim Djabour

Legend

- (C) Team captain
- (I) Import player
- Injured

=== Arab Club Championship roster ===
Note: Flags indicate national team eligibility at FIBA-sanctioned events. Players may hold other non-FIBA nationalities not displayed.

USM Alger roster
Players
Coaches

Pos.	No.	Nat.	Name	Ht.	Wt.	Age
C	0	(Algeria)	Saidi, Nabil (C)	2.00 m (6 ft 7 in)		46 – 13 March 1980
SF	1	(Algeria)	Belhadj, Ramadan	1.70 m (5 ft 7 in)		31 – 5 April 1995
G	2	(United States)	Williams II, George A. (I)	1.98 m (6 ft 6 in)		36 – 16 April 1990
PG	4	(Algeria)	Khoudja, Zakaria	1.82 m (6 ft 0 in)		21 – 10 May 2005
PF	5	(Algeria)	Guezout, Zakaria	2.00 m (6 ft 7 in)		34 – 30 July 1992
G/F	9	(Algeria)	Dekkiche, Abdesslem	1.94 m (6 ft 4 in)		40 – 27 February 1986
	10	(Algeria)	Berremila, Mehdi			33 – 30 July 1993
PF	11	(Algeria)	Redouane, Tarek	1.98 m (6 ft 6 in)		33 – 11 April 1993
C	12	(Algeria)	Benzaime, Sidali	2.03 m (6 ft 8 in)		23 – 4 December 2002
G	13	(Algeria)	Adrar, Lotfi	1.99 m (6 ft 6 in)		43 – 13 August 1983
PF	16	(Algeria)	Belliche, Omar	2.04 m (6 ft 8 in)		34 – 16 February 1992
SG	21	(Algeria)	Medjoubi, Bacim	1.88 m (6 ft 2 in)		25 – 20 October 2001
C	23	(Algeria)	Messaoudi, Faredj	2.15 m (7 ft 1 in)		23 – 20 January 2003

Head coach

- (Algeria) Réda El Hachemi

Assistant coach(es)

- (Algeria) Nassim Djabour

Legend

- (C) Team captain
- (I) Import player
- Injured

- Roster
Updated: October 2, 2023

=== Transactions ===
==== In ====
No.	Pos.	Nat.	Name	Age	Moving from		Type	Ends	Transfer fee	Date	Source
2	G	(United States)	George Williams	36	Marinos	(Venezuela)	Transfer	October 2023 (ACC only)	Free	9 September 2023	

==== Out ====
No.	Pos.	Nat.	Name	Age	Moving to		Type	Transfer fee	Date	Source
	G	(United States)	George Williams	36	Sagesse SC	(Lebanon)	End of contract	Free	19 October 2023	
10	C	(Algeria)	Faredj Messaoudi	23	Shonan Sesaside	(Japan)	Transfer	Free	5 February 2024	

== Competitions ==
=== Overview ===
Competition	First match	Last match	Starting round	Final position	Record							
Competition	First match	Last match	Starting round	Final position	Pld	W	D	L	PF	PA	PD	Win %
Super Division	10 November 2023	14 May 2024	Round 1	4th	30	20		10	2,205	1,982	+223	66.67
Super Division Playoffs	31 May 2024	22 June 2024	First playoff	5th	5	1		4	370	396	−26	20.00
Algerian Cup	5 April 2024	17 July 2024	Round of 32	Winners	5	5		0	368	284	+84	100.00
Arab Club Championship	1 October 2023	9 October 2023	Group stage	Quarter-finals	6	4		2	449	446	+3	66.67
Total					46	30	0	16	3,392	3,108	+284	65.22

Last updated: July 17, 2024
Source: Competitions

=== Super Division ===
==== League table ====
Pos	Team	Pld	W	L	GF	GA	GD	Pts	
2	NB Staouéli	30	22	8	2202	1886	+316	52	Advance to playoffs
3	MC Alger	30	24	6	2073	1752	+321	52 (Note: MC Alger were deducted 2 points due to absence from the match against US Sétif and M Ouled Chebel.)	Advance to playoffs
4	USM Alger	30	20	10	2205	1982	+223	50	Advance to playoffs
5	TRA Draria	30	19	11	2070	2014	+56	49	Advance to playoffs
6	NA Hussein Dey	30	18	12	2099	1990	+109	48	Advance to playoffs

First match(es) will be played: May 14, 2024. Source: FABB

==== Results summary ====
Overall						Home					Away				
Pld	W	L	PF	PA	PD	W	L	PF	PA	PD	W	L	PF	PA	PD
30	20	10	2205	1982	+223	11	4	1093	960	+133	9	6	1112	1022	+90

Last updated: May 14, 2024.
Source: Competitive matches

==== Results by round ====
Round	1	2	3	4	5	6	7	8	9	10	11	12	13	14	15	16	17	18	19	20	21	22	23	24	25	26	27	28	29	30
Ground	H	H	A	H	A	H	A	H	A	H	A	H	A	H	A	A	A	H	A	H	A	H	A	H	A	H	A	H	A	H
Result	W	L	W	W	W	L	W	W	L	W	W	W	L	W	L	W	L	L	L	W	L	L	W	W	W	W	W	W	W	W
Position							4	3	5	3	4	2	4	3	3	3	4			7	8	8	8			6	4	4	4	4

Source: Competitive matches
A = Away; H = Home; W = Win; L = Loss; R = Rest

==== Matches ====
All times are local, WAT (UTC+1).

November 10, 2023 3	MC Alger	68–71	USM Alger	Hydra
17:30	Scoring by quarter: –, –, –, –
				Arena: Salle omnisport Abdelaziz Ben Tifour; Attendance: 0 (close doors); Referees: Amrane, Zahaf; Table: Hamidache, Doucene, Bechker

November 19, 2023 1	USM Alger	90–63	ASS Oum El Bouaghi	Raïs Hamidou
15:00	Scoring by quarter: –, –, –, –
				Arena: Salle OMS Mourad Boukechoura; Attendance: 0 (close doors); Referees: Amrane, Kahil; Table: Lerari, Rezik, Khenifsa

November 23, 2023 4	USM Alger	63–55	NB Staouéli	Raïs Hamidou
17:00	Scoring by quarter: –, –, –, –
	Pts: Nabil Saidi 21			Arena: Salle OMS Mourad Boukechoura; Attendance: 0 (close doors); Referees: Kaddour, Emtir; Table: khenifsa, Lerari, Bechker

November 28, 2023 5	CSC Djasr Kasentina	66–69	USM Alger	Birtouta
18:00	Scoring by quarter: –, –, –, –
			Pts: Messouadi Bouhaous 10; Rebs: Messouadi Bouhaous 13	Arena: Salle Omnisports Birtouta; Referees: Ghaib, Kahalou; Table: Bouras, Cherfaoui, Afiane

December 2, 2023 6	USM Alger	63–75	USM Blida	Raïs Hamidou
15:30	Scoring by quarter: 10–16, 22–16, 20–18, 11–25
		Boxscore		Arena: Salle OMS Mourad Boukechoura; Referees: Fouchene, Kahalou; Table: Lerari, Mokhtari, Behcher

December 7, 2023 7	NA Hussein Dey	59–74	USM Alger	Algiers
18:00	Scoring by quarter: 19–20, 19–16, 12–15, 9–23
		Boxscore	Pts: Bacem Medjoubi 24	Arena: Salle Mohamed Handjer; Referees: Si Youcef, Fouchene; Table: Zermani, Salah, Cherfaoui

January 9, 2024 2	USM Alger	63–78	WO Boufarik	Algiers
18:30	Scoring by quarter: 23–19, 15–15, 15–22, 10–22
		Boxscore		Arena: Hacène Harcha Arena

January 12, 2024 8	USM Alger	79–62	OS Bordj Bou Arréridj	Raïs Hamidou
15:00	Scoring by quarter: –, –, –, –
		[ Boxscore]		Arena: Salle OMS Mourad Boukechoura; Referees: Kahalou, Kahil; Table: Boukahla, Khenifsa, Hamidache

January 16, 2024 9	Rouiba Club Basketball	71–62	USM Alger	Rouïba
18:00	Scoring by quarter: 16–10, 11–26, 21–13, 23–13
		Boxscore		Arena: Salle Omnisport de Rouïba; Referees: Ghaib, Harrach; Table: Zermani, Haddad.A, Khenifsa

January 20, 2024 10	USM Alger	75–65	TRA Draria	Raïs Hamidou
18:00	Scoring by quarter: 15–12, 21–17, 22–15, 17–21
	Pts: Zakaria Guezout 16	Boxscore		Arena: Salle OMS Mourad Boukechoura; Referees: Si Youcef, Harrach; Table: Mezdad, Chafa, Laichaoui

January 26, 2024 11	CRB Dar Beida	66–68	USM Alger	Dar El Beïda
17:00	Scoring by quarter: –, –, –, –
		[ Boxscore]		Referees: Ghaib, Harrach; Table: Rezik, Doucene, Lerari

January 30, 2024 12	USM Alger	73–54	CR Beni Saf	Raïs Hamidou
15:00	Scoring by quarter: 21–12, 19–12, 22–15, 11–15
		Boxscore		Arena: Salle OMS Mourad Boukechoura; Referees: Kahil, Laoubi; Table: Lerari, Rezik, Cherfaoui

February 3, 2024 13	PS El Eulma	76–71	USM Alger	El Eulma
15:00	Scoring by quarter: 27–18, 15–17, 13–25, 21–11
		Boxscore		Arena: Salle Mohamed Sayeh Kechkouchi; Referees: Latibi, Harrach; Table: Bourenane, Bouzida

February 9, 2024 14	USM Alger	67–64	US Sétif	Raïs Hamidou
15:00	Scoring by quarter: –, –, –, –
		Boxscore		Arena: Salle OMS Mourad Boukechoura; Referees: Kahalou, Laoubi; Table: Cherfaoui, Mezdad, Laichaoui

February 13, 2024 15	M Ouled Chebel	58–57	USM Alger	Ouled Chebel
17:00	Scoring by quarter: –, –, –, –
		Boxscore		Arena: Salle OMS Boualem Bouhedja; Referees: Ferhani, Fouchene; Table: Afiane, Boufenik.T, Haddad.A

February 17, 2024 16	ASS Oum El Bouaghi	53–102	USM Alger	Oum El Bouaghi
15:00	Scoring by quarter: –, –, –, –
		[ Boxscore]		Arena: Salle Oum El Bouaghi; Referees: Bennani, Latibi; Table: Bouzida, Boughediri, Djaballah

February 23, 2024 17	WO Boufarik	83–65	USM Alger	Boufarik
17:00	Scoring by quarter: –, –, –, –
		[ Boxscore]		Arena: Moussa Chiraf Arena; Referees: Zenagui, Ghaib; Table: Boukerouche, Bouras, Afiane

March 2, 2024 19	NB Staouéli	72–68	USM Alger	Staoueli
17:00	Scoring by quarter: 23–11, 7–23, 24–20, 18–14
		[ Boxscore]		Arena: Salle de Staouéli; Referees: Chaib, Bennani.A; Table: Lerari, Cherfaoui, Afiane

March 8, 2024 18	USM Alger	45–61	MC Alger	Hydra
15:00	Scoring by quarter: 13–18, 8–9, 13–15, 11–19
		[ Boxscore]		Arena: Salle omnisport Abdelaziz Ben Tifour; Referees: Ferhani, Rahali; Table: Rezik, Lerari, Khenifssa
Note: The match was originally to be played on 27 February 2024, 5:00 p.m, but it was postponed due to rain entering the Salle Rais Hamidou. The sports commission decides that the match is to be replayed at the opponent's home (MC Alger) at the Salle omnisport Abdelaziz Ben Tifour in Hydra on March 8, 2024 at 3:00 p.m. "Art 20 of the special regulations 2023–24". MC Alger is responsible for organizing the meeting and must put in place all the necessary arrangements for the smooth running of the game.

March 14, 2024 20	USM Alger	64–50	CSC Djasr Kasentina	Raïs Hamidou
22:30	Scoring by quarter: 13–16, 8–15, 20–12, 23–7
		Boxscore		Arena: Salle OMS Mourad Boukechoura; Referees: Larouci, Harrach; Table: Lerari, Rezik, Khenifsa

March 21, 2024 21	USM Blida	85–79	USM Alger	Blida
22:30	Scoring by quarter: 21–25, 22–17, 21–20, 21–17
		Boxscore		Arena: Hocine Chalane Arena; Referees: Zenagui, Amrane; Table: Larachiche, Chakour, Khelafi

March 26, 2024 22	USM Alger	70–81	NA Hussein Dey	Staoueli
22:30	Scoring by quarter: 18–30, 11–10, 17–21, 24–20
		Boxscore		Arena: Salle de Staouéli; Referees: Larouci, Fouchene; Table: Lerari, Cherfaoui, Khenifsa

March 30, 2024 23	OS Bordj Bou Arréridj	55–78	USM Alger	Bordj Bou Arréridj
22:30	Scoring by quarter: 12–19, 13–16, 11–26, 19–17
		Boxscore		Arena: Salle omnisports du 18 Février; Referees: Ferhani, Zaza; Table: Sediki, Oumhata, Angag

April 12, 2024 24	USM Alger	86–75	Rouiba Club Basketball	Raïs Hamidou
15:00	Scoring by quarter: 24–16, 23–20, 19–13, 20–26
		Boxscore		Arena: Salle OMS Mourad Boukechoura; Referees: Larouci, Amrane; Table: Rezik, Lerari, Cherfaoui

April 19, 2024 25	TRA Draria	72–78	USM Alger	Ouled Fayet
15:00	Scoring by quarter: 23–16, 17–26, 18–16, 14–20
		Boxscore		Arena: Salle OMS Ghazali Salem; Referees: Amrane, Harrach; Table: Mokhtari, Bechker, Boukerouche

April 23, 2024 26	USM Alger	81–51	CRB Dar Beida	Raïs Hamidou
15:00	Scoring by quarter: 24–12, 18–14, 18–13, 21–12
		Boxscore		Arena: Salle OMS Mourad Boukechoura; Referees: Kahalou, Kahil; Table: Khenifsa, Doucene, Cherfaoui

April 30, 2024 27	CR Beni Saf	68–90	USM Alger	Hammam Bou Hadjar
15:00	Scoring by quarter: –, –, –, –
		[ Boxscore]		Arena: Salle OMS Larbi Bendjerid; Referees: Kaddour, Benmendil; Table: Defeili, Tchouar, Benfodda.I

May 4, 2024 28	USM Alger	97–61	PS El Eulma	Raïs Hamidou
15:00	Scoring by quarter: 23–16, 27–19, 19–10, 28–16
		Boxscore		Arena: Salle OMS Mourad Boukechoura; Referees: Ferrani, Fouchene; Table: Cherfaoui, Lerari, Rezik

May 10, 2024 29	US Sétif	70–80	USM Alger	Sétif
15:00	Scoring by quarter: –, –, –, –
		[ Boxscore]		Arena: Salle 8 Mai 1945; Referees: Hamada, Aimeur; Table: Tekouk, Gurmeche.A, Boutobza

May 14, 2024 30	USM Alger	77–65	M Ouled Chebel	Raïs Hamidou
15:00	Scoring by quarter: 26–19, 9–20, 24–12, 18–14
		Boxscore		Arena: Salle OMS Mourad Boukechoura; Referees: Zenagui, Ghaib; Table: Mokhtari, Boukerouche, Ezedami

==== Super Division Playoffs ====
Playoffs table
Pos	Team	Pld	W	L	GF	GA	GD	Pts	
2	TRA Draria	5	3	2	395	369	+26	8	Qualification to the Super Division final
3	MC Alger	5	3	2	342	318	+24	8	
4	NB Staouéli	5	3	2	382	351	+31	8	
5	USM Alger	5	1	4	370	396	−26	6	
6	NA Hussein Dey	5	0	5	348	439	−91	5	

First match(es) will be played: June 22, 2024. Source:

May 31, 2024 Round 1	WO Boufarik	85–78	USM Alger	Staoueli
15:00	Scoring by quarter: 20–21, 23–24, 23–10, 19–23
	Pts: Redouane Mimouni 15; Rebs: Mohamed Seddik Touati 9 Asts: Four players 4	Boxscore	Pts: Nabil Saidi 15; Rebs: Lotfi Adrar 6 Asts: Tarek Redouane 5	Arena: Salle de Staouéli; Referees: Mohamed Houari Benmendil, Abderezak Fouchene

June 1, 2024 Round 2	USM Alger	67–75	NB Staouéli	Staoueli
18:00	Scoring by quarter: 16–20, 18–15, 19–19, 14–21
	Pts: Zakaria Guezout 23; Rebs: Zakaria Guezout 12; Asts: Two players 5	Boxscore	Pts: Hichem Dahkakene 31; Rebs: Abderraouf Benghiri 10; Asts: Hichem Dahkakene 6	Arena: Salle de Staouéli; Referees: Mhamed Berrah, Mouaadh Harrache

June 20, 2024 Round 3	MC Alger	77–70	USM Alger	Boufarik
17:00	Scoring by quarter: 25–21, 15–22, 18–20, 19–7
	Pts: Ramzi Merahi 19; Rebs: Mustapha Adrar 12; Asts: Two players 5	Boxscore	Pts: Nabil Saidi 20; Rebs: Zakaria Guezout 11; Asts: Moussa Bougria 10	Arena: Moussa Chiraf Arena; Referees: Mhamed Berrah, Sofiane Hammada

June 21, 2024 Round 4	NA Hussein Dey	76–80	USM Alger	Boufarik
15:00	Scoring by quarter: 22–30, 14–14, 24–17, 16–19
	Pts: Omar Belliche 18; Rebs: Two players 9 Asts: Mounir Djelili 8	Boxscore	Pts: Merouane Yahya 23; Rebs: Bouhaous Messaoudi 13; Asts: Bouhaous Messaoudi 9	Arena: Moussa Chiraf Arena; Referees: Sofiane Hammada, Farid Amrane

June 22, 2024 Round 5	USM Alger	75–83(OT)	TRA Draria	Boufarik
17:00	Scoring by quarter: 16–21, 20–14, 18–11, 16–24, Overtime: 5–13
	Pts: Nabil Saidi 14; Rebs: Two players 10; Asts: Two players 5	Boxscore	Pts: Adel Mokrani 26; Rebs: Two players 9 Asts: Amine Bensalah 6	Arena: Moussa Chiraf Arena; Referees: Mhamed Berrah, Farid Amrane

=== Algerian Cup ===
April 5, 2024 Round of 32	USM Alger	80–48	ACB Tighenif	Boukadir
21:30	Scoring by quarter: –, –, –, –
				Arena: Salle OMS Boukadir; Referees: Berrah, Haddad.S; Table: Larachiche, Chakor, Khelafi

April 26, 2024 Round of 16	CR Beni Saf	68–85	USM Alger	Boukadir
15:00	Scoring by quarter: –, –, –, –
				Arena: Salle OMS Boukadir; Referees: Zenagui, Salah; Table: Larachiche, Chakor, Khelafi

May 20, 2024 Quarter-finals	CSC Djasr Kasentina	58–73	USM Alger	Algiers
16:00	Scoring by quarter: 9–29, 19–13, 9–15, 21–16
		Boxscore		Arena: La Coupole d'Alger Arena; Referees: Bennani, Kaddour, Tahmi; Table: Haddad, Khenifsa, Boukerouche

June 14, 2024 Semi-finals	USM Alger	59–41	NA Hussein Dey	Rouïba
17:00	Scoring by quarter: 18–14, 16–11, 12–8, 13–8
		Boxscore		Arena: Salle OMS Mohamed Kadiri; Referees: Larouci, Zahaf, Ainouz

July 17, 2024 Final	WO Boufarik	69–71	USM Alger	Algiers
17:00	Scoring by quarter: 11–25, 11–20, 21–18, 26–8
	Pts: Merahi 24; Rebs: Achache 9 Asts: Kaouane 6	Boxscore	Pts: Guezout 15; Rebs: Messaoudi 7 Asts: Bougria 6	Arena: La Coupole d'Alger Arena; Referees: Sofiane Hammada, Anis Bennani, Sofiane Si Youcef

=== Arab Club Championship ===
==== Group phase ====
Pos	Team	Pld	W	L	GF	GA	GD	Pts	Qualification
1	(Egypt) Al Ittihad Alexandria	4	4	0	413	247	+166	8	Advance to knock-out phase
2	(Algeria) USM Alger	4	3	1	294	267	+27	7	Advance to knock-out phase
3	Dynamo Lebanon	4	2	2	344	304	+40	6	Advance to knock-out phase
4	(Oman) Al-Seeb	4	1	3	254	336	−82	5	Advance to knock-out phase
5	(Qatar) Al Ahli Doha	4	0	4	227	378	−151	4	

Source: Asia-basket.com

October 1, 2023 1	USM Alger (Algeria)	81–57	(Oman) Al-Seeb Club	Doha, Qatar
15:30	Scoring by quarter: 17-13, 18-8, 23-18, 23-18
	Pts: Zaki Guzout 14; Rebs: Omar Belliche 13; Asts: Abdesslem Dekkiche 6	Boxscore	Pts: Brice Johnson 23; Rebs: Walim Jossief 8 Asts: Four players 1	Arena: Al Gharafa Sports Club Hall

October 2, 2023 2	Al Ittihad Alexandria (Egypt)	89–53	(Algeria) USM Alger	Doha, Qatar
16:30	Scoring by quarter: 16-11, 27-5, 23-20, 23-17
	Pts: Yusuf Shehata 14; Rebs: Manny Harris 8 Asts: Manny Harris 5	Boxscore	Pts: George Williams 19; Rebs: Sidali Benzaime 11; Asts: Abdesslem Dekkiche 3	Arena: AlRayyan Sport Hall

October 3, 2023 3	USM Alger (Algeria)	83–54	(Qatar) Al Ahli SC	Doha, Qatar
18:30	Scoring by quarter: 20-14, 23-16, 18-12, 22-12
	Pts: George Williams 17; Rebs: Two players 8 Asts: George Williams 5	Boxscore	Pts: Johnathan Hudson 38; Rebs: Johnathan Hudson 9 Asts: Johnathan Hudson 3	Arena: AlRayyan Sport Hall

October 6, 2023 4	Dynamo Lebanon	68–77	(Algeria) USM Alger	Doha, Qatar
14:00	Scoring by quarter: 14-18, 20-23, 18-11, 14-25
	Pts: Two players 19; Rebs: Omar Jamaledine 10; Asts: Two players 3	Boxscore	Pts: George Williams 25; Rebs: Two players 9 Asts: George Williams 5	Arena: Al Gharafa Sports Club Hall

=== Knock-out phase ===
October 8, 2023 Round of 16	USM Alger (Algeria)	77–70(OT)	Qatar Club	Doha, Qatar
18:00	Scoring by quarter: 15-20, 10-15, 19-14, 18-13, Overtime: 15–8
	Pts: George Williams 34; Rebs: George Williams 12; Asts: George Williams 4	Boxscore	Pts: Meho Haracic 29; Rebs: Two players 10; Asts: Two players 3	Arena: AlRayyan Sport Hall

October 9, 2023 Quarter finals	USM Alger (Algeria)	78–110	(Lebanon) Beirut Club	Doha, Qatar
18:00	Scoring by quarter: 17-24, 17-39, 26-22, 18-25
	Pts: George Williams 16; Rebs: Two players 5 Asts: Abdesslem Dekkiche 6	Boxscore	Pts: Tony Mitchell 23; Rebs: Three players 6 Asts: Ali Mezher 8	Arena: AlRayyan Sport Hall

== Statistics ==
=== Super Division Playoffs ===
Legend
GP	Games played	GS	Games started	MPG	Minutes per game
FG%	Field-goal percentage	3P%	3-point field-goal percentage	FT%	Free-throw percentage
RPG	Rebounds per game	APG	Assists per game	SPG	Steals per game
BPG	Blocks per game	PPG	Points per game

Player	GP	GS	MPG	2FG%	3FG%	FT%	RPG	APG	PPG
Nabil Saidi	5	0	29.6	45.65%	18.18%	75%	6.6	1.4	13.8
Ramadane Belhadj	5	0	19.4	44.44%	26.66%	68.75%	2.6	2.2	6.2
Zakaria Khoudja	2	0	4.6	40%	0%	0%	0.6	0.4	0.8
Zakaria Guezout	5	5	33.2	30.30%	20.45%	80.76%	7.2	4.0	13.6
Moussa Bougria	5	5	27.2	46.42%	14.28%	50%	4.8	4.0	7.6
Bouhaous Messaoudi	5	5	25.4	36.84%	46.66%	53.84%	7.8	4.0	8.4
Tarek Redouane	5	1	10.6	57.14%	50%	33.33%	3.0	2.6	2.4
Lotfi Adrar	4	4	24.1	52.17%	23.52%	66.66%	5.0	3.6	9.2
Bassem Medjoubi	5	5	13.4	22.22%	38.46%	100%	1.4	0.6	4.2
Abdelmounaim Sadouki	0	0	–	–	–	–	–	–	–
Adlene Toufik Adberrahim	2	0	1.0	0%	0%	0%	0.6	0.0	0
Merouane Yahya	5	0	15.5	53.33%	55.55%	72.72%	3.8	1.4	7.8
TOTAL				42.56%	27.2%	69.42%	46.6	24.2	74

=== Arab Club Basketball Championship ===
Player	GP	GS	MPG	2FG%	3FG%	FT%	RPG	APG	SPG	BPG	PPG
Nabil Saidi	6	1	15:0	55.6%	6.7%	66.7%	2.5	0.7	0.8	0.2	6.5
Ramadan Belhadj	4	0	8:5	100.0%	30.0%	0.0%	0.5	0.8	0.5	0	3.3
George Williams	6	6	36:3	54.1%	38.5%	84.4%	4.7	3.7	0.7	0	20.5
Zakaria Matoub	4	0	6:5	33.3%	0.0%	66.7%	0.3	0.8	0.3	0	1.0
Zakaria Guezout	6	5	24:4	58.8%	19.2%	76.0%	3.5	0.7	0.3	0.2	9.0
Abdesslem Dekkiche	6	4	24:3	51.9%	22.2%	50.0%	4.2	3.0	2.0	0.2	7.7
Mahdi Bermila	5	3	19:8	42.9%	13.6%	100.0%	2.4	1.2	0.8	0.2	3.4
Tareq Redoune	5	0	12:2	22.2%	0.0%	50.0%	3.0	0.8	0.6	0	1.0
Sidali Benzaime	6	3	19:7	55.8%	0.0%	60.0%	7.2	0.2	1.5	0.8	9.0
Lotfi Adrar	6	5	25:3	57.7%	0.0%	28.6%	4.5	1.7	2.0	0.5	5.3
Bassem Medjoubi	5	0	8:8	85.7%	26.7%	75.0%	1.2	0.4	0.4	0	5.4
Faredj Messaoudi	4	0	8:8	42.9%	0.0%	28.6%	4.3	0.3	0.5	0.5	3.5
Omar Belliche	4	3	22:5	13.3%	20.8%	100.0%	7.5	0.8	0.3	0.3	5.3
TOTAL				51.6%	20.2%	66.1%	40.3	13.5	9.8	2.5	74.8
