= 2018 Thomas Cup qualification =

Tournament details
- Dates: 6 – 18 February 2018
- Venue: BA: Stadium Sultan Abdul Halim; BCA: Hacène Harcha Arena; BE: Kazan Gymnastics Centre; BO: Eastlink Badminton Stadium; BPA: National Racquet Centre
- Location: BA: Alor Setar, Malaysia; BCA: Algiers, Algeria; BE: Kazan, Russia; BO: Hamilton, New Zealand; BPA: Tacarigua, Trinidad & Tobago

The 2018 Thomas Cup qualification process is a series of tournaments organised by the five BWF confederations to decide 14 of the 16 teams which will play in the 2018 Thomas Cup, with Thailand qualifying automatically as hosts, and Denmark qualifying automatically as trophy holder.

== Qualified teams ==
Country	Confederation	Qualified as	Qualified on	World Team Rankings	Final appearance
Thailand	Badminton Asia	Host country	18 March 2017	9th	13th
Denmark	Badminton Europe	2016 Thomas Cup winners	22 May 2016	2nd	30th
Australia	Badminton Oceania	2018 Oceania Championships winners	7 February 2018	23rd	4th
China	Badminton Asia	2018 Asia Team Championships semifinalists	9 February 2018	1st	19th
Indonesia	Badminton Asia	2018 Asia Team Championships semifinalists	9 February 2018	3rd	27th
Malaysia	Badminton Asia	2018 Asia Team Championships semifinalists	9 February 2018	7th	27th
South Korea	Badminton Asia	2018 Asia Team Championships semifinalists	9 February 2018	8th	18th
Algeria	Badminton Africa	2018 All Africa Team Championships winner	15 February 2018	55th	Debut
England	Badminton Europe	2018 European Team Championships semifinalists	16 February 2018	11th	15th
France	Badminton Europe	2018 European Team Championships semifinalists	16 February 2018	14th	3rd
Germany	Badminton Europe	2018 European Team Championships semifinalists	16 February 2018	13th	8th
Canada	Badminton Pan Am	2018 Pan Am Badminton Championships winner	18 February 2018	16th	6th
Russia	Badminton Europe	Best ranking (Europe)^{1}	22 February 2018	12th	3rd
Chinese Taipei	Badminton Asia	Best ranking (overall)	22 February 2018	4th	3rd
Japan	Badminton Asia	Best ranking (overall)	22 February 2018	5th	15th
India	Badminton Asia	Best ranking (overall)	22 February 2018	6th	12th

- ^1 Since Denmark, one of the semifinalists for European qualification tournament had already qualified as the title holder, hence the spot is given to the best European team from World Team Ranking.

== Qualification process ==
The number of teams participating in the final tournament is 16. Even though the qualification process began in February 2018, the allocation of slots for each confederation is same the allocation as 2016 tournament.

=== Summary of qualification ===
Confederation	Teams started	Teams that have qualified	Teams that can still qualify	Teams that have been eliminated	Remaining places in finals	Total places in finals
Badminton Africa	12	1	0	11	0	1
Badminton Asia	14+1	4+1	0	10	0	4+1
Badminton Europe	29+1	4+1	0	25	0	4+1
Badminton Pan Am	7	1	0	6	0	1
Badminton Oceania	4	1	0	3	0	1
Various	—N/a	3	—N/a	—N/a	0	3
Total	66+2	14+2	0	55	0	14+2

Note

- Badminton Asia total includes +1 for Thailand as hosts.
- Badminton Europe total includes +1 for Denmark as trophy holders.
- Various is the top three of the ranking qualification.

== Confederation qualification ==
=== Badminton Confederation of Africa ===
The qualification for the African teams was held from 12 to 15 February 2018, at the Hacène Harcha Arena in Algiers, Algeria. The winners of the African qualification will qualified for the Thomas Cup.

==== Teams in contention ====
Teams qualified for the Group stage

- Algeria
- Cameroon
- Egypt
- Ghana
- Ivory Coast
- Mauritius
- Morocco
- Nigeria
- Seychelles
- Uganda
- Zambia
- Zimbabwe

==== First round (group stage) ====
Advance to Knockout stage

Group A
Group B

Pos	Team	Pld	Pts
1	Mauritius	1	1
2	Cameroon	2	1
3	Tunisia	1	0

Source: TS

Pos	Team	Pld	Pts
1	Algeria	2	2
2	Zambia	2	1
3	Ivory Coast	2	0

Source: TS
Group C
Group D

Pos	Team	Pld	Pts
1	Nigeria	2	2
2	Morocco	2	1
3	Seychelles	2	0

Source: TS

Pos	Team	Pld	Pts
1	Ghana	2	2
2	Egypt	2	1
3	Zimbabwe	2	0

Source: TS

==== Second round (knockout stage) ====
Quarter-finals
14 February
Mauritius	3
Zambia	0
14 February
Algeria	3
Cameroon	0
14 February
Egypt	2
Ghana	3
14 February
Morocco	0
Nigeria	3

Semi-finals
14 February
Mauritius	1
Algeria	3
14 February
Ghana	1
Nigeria	3

Final
15 February
Algeria	3
Nigeria	2

=== Badminton Asia ===
The qualification for the Asian teams was held from 6 to 11 February 2018, at the Stadium Sultan Abdul Halim in Alor Setar, Malaysia. The semi-finalist of the Asian qualification will qualified for the Thomas Cup. Thailand qualifying automatically as hosts.

==== Teams in contention ====
Teams qualified for the Group stage

- China
- Hong Kong
- Indonesia
- India
- Japan
- Kazakhstan
- Malaysia
- Maldives
- Myanmar
- Nepal
- Philippines
- Singapore
- South Korea
- Chinese Taipei
- Thailand (qualified)

==== First round (group stage) ====
Advance to Knockout stage

Group A
Group B

Pos	Team	Pld	Pts
1	China	2	2
2	Hong Kong	2	1
3	Singapore	2	0

Source: TS

Pos	Team	Pld	Pts
1	South Korea	3	3
2	Japan	3	2
3	Kazakhstan	3	1
4	Nepal	3	0

Source: TS
Group C
Group D

Pos	Team	Pld	Pts
1	Malaysia	3	2
2	Thailand	3	2
3	Chinese Taipei	3	2
4	Myanmar	3	0

Source: TS

Pos	Team	Pld	Pts
1	Indonesia	3	3
2	India	3	2
3	Philippines	3	1
4	Maldives	3	0

Source: TS

==== Second round (knockout stage) ====
Quarter-finals
9 February 17:00
China (1)	3
India (5)	1
9 February 17:00
Malaysia (7)	3
Hong Kong	0
9 February 17:00
Thailand	1
South Korea (6)	3
9 February 17:00
Japan (4)	0
Indonesia (2)	3

Semi-finals
10 February 18:00
China (1)	3
Malaysia (7)	1
10 February 18:00
South Korea (6)	2
Indonesia (2)	3

Final
11 February 18:00
China (1)	1
Indonesia (2)	3

=== Badminton Europe ===
The qualification for the European teams will held from 13 to 18 February 2018, at the Kazan Gymnastics Centre in Kazan, Russia. The semi-finalist of the European qualification will qualified for the Thomas Cup. Denmark qualified automatically as trophy holder.

==== Teams in contention ====
Teams qualified for the Group stage

- Austria
- Azerbaijan
- Belgium
- Bulgaria
- Croatia
- Czech Republic
- Denmark (qualified)
- England
- Estonia
- Finland
- France
- Germany
- Greenland
- Hungary
- Iceland
- Ireland
- Israel
- Italy
- Latvia
- Lithuania
- Luxembourg
- Norway
- Poland
- Portugal
- Russia
- Slovakia
- Spain
- Turkey
- Ukraine

==== First round (group stage) ====
Advance to Knockout stage

Group 1
Group 2
Group 3

Pos	Team	Pld	Pts
1	Denmark	3	3
2	Ireland	3	2
3	Croatia	3	1
4	Israel	3	0

Source: TS

Pos	Team	Pld	Pts
1	England	3	3
2	Hungary	3	2
3	Slovakia	3	1
4	Greenland	3	0

Source: TS

Pos	Team	Pld	Pts
1	Germany	3	3
2	Iceland	3	2
3	Luxembourg	3	1
4	Azerbaijan	3	0

Source: TS
Group 4
Group 5
Group 6

Pos	Team	Pld	Pts
1	Russia	3	3
2	Bulgaria	3	2
3	Spain	3	1
4	Belgium	3	0

Source: TS

Pos	Team	Pld	Pts
1	France	3	3
2	Ukraine	3	2
3	Austria	3	1
4	Lithuania	3	0

Source: TS

Pos	Team	Pld	Pts
1	Poland	3	3
2	Czech Republic	3	2
3	Italy	3	1
4	Portugal	3	0

Source: TS
Group 7

Pos	Team	Pld	Pts
1	Finland	4	4
2	Turkey	4	3
3	Estonia	4	2
4	Norway	4	1
5	Latvia	4	0

Source: TS

Ranking of runners-up

Due to group 7 having different number of teams, the results against the fifth-placed teams are not considered for this ranking.

Pos	Grp	Team	Pld	W	L	MF	MA	MD	GF	GA	GD	PF	PA	PD	Pts	Qualification
1	6	Czech Republic	3	2	1	11	4	+7	23	12	+11	666	604	+62	2	Knockout stage
2	1	Ireland	3	2	1	10	5	+5	19	10	+9	528	478	+50	2	
3	5	Ukraine	3	2	1	9	6	+3	19	12	+7	551	490	+61	2	
4	7	Turkey	3	2	1	8	7	+1	18	16	+2	604	564	+40	2	
5	3	Iceland	3	2	1	8	7	+1	17	15	+2	527	530	−3	2	
6	4	Bulgaria	3	2	1	8	7	+1	18	16	+2	577	607	−30	2	
7	2	Hungary	3	2	1	8	7	+1	17	17	0	601	585	+16	2	

==== Second round (knockout stage) ====
Quarter-finals
16 February 2018
Denmark	3
Finland	0
16 February 2018
Germany	3
Czech Republic	1
16 February 2018
France	3
Russia	2
16 February 2018
Poland	0
England	3

Semi-finals
17 February 2018
Denmark	3
Germany	1
17 February 2018
France	1
England	3

Final
18 February 2018
Denmark	3
England	1

=== Badminton Pan Am ===
The qualification for the Pan American teams was held from 15 to 18 February 2018, at the National Racket Centre in Tacarigua, Trinidad and Tobago. The winner of the Pan American qualification, Canada was qualified for the Thomas Cup.

==== Teams in contention ====
Teams qualified for the Group stage

- Barbados
- Canada
- Dominican Republic
- Jamaica
- Peru
- Trinidad and Tobago
- United States

==== First round (group stage) ====
Advance to Knockout stage

Group A

Pos	Team	Pld	Pts
1	Canada	2	2
2	Peru	2	1
3	Barbados	2	0

Source: TS
Group B

Pos	Team	Pld	Pts
1	United States	3	3
2	Jamaica	3	2
3	Dominican Republic	3	1
4	Trinidad and Tobago	3	0

Source: TS

==== Second round (knockout stage) ====
Semi-finals
17 February
Canada	3
Jamaica	1
17 February
Peru	2
United States	3

Final
18 February
Canada	3
United States	0

=== Badminton Oceania ===
The qualification for the Oceanian teams was held from 6 to 7 February 2018, at the Eastlink Badminton Stadium in Hamilton, New Zealand. The winner of the Oceania qualification qualified for the Thomas Cup.

==== Teams in contention ====
- Australia
- Fiji
- New Zealand
- Tahiti

==== Round-robin ====
Pos	Team	Pld	W	L	MF	MA	MD	GF	GA	GD	PF	PA	PD	Pts	Qualification
1	Australia	3	3	0	12	3	+9	25	7	+18	612	430	+182	3	Thomas Cup
2	New Zealand	3	2	1	11	4	+7	24	9	+15	651	412	+239	2	
3	Tahiti	3	1	2	6	9	−3	12	20	−8	491	608	−117	1	
4	Fiji	3	0	3	1	14	−13	3	28	−25	346	650	−304	0	

Source: TS

== World team rankings ==
Below is the chart of the BWF World Team Ranking calculated by adding World Ranking of top three Men's Singles players and top two Men's Doubles pairs on 22 February 2018.

Rank	Conf.	Nation	Points	Continental results	Qualification status
1	BA	China	374,916	Runner-up	Qualified as BA semifinalists
2	BE	Denmark	320,038	Winner	Qualified as trophy holder
3	BA	Indonesia	294,377	Winner	Qualified as BA semifinalists
4	BA	Chinese Taipei	272,749	Group stage	Qualified as ranking (overall)
5	BA	Japan	257,271	Quarterfinals	Qualified as ranking (overall)
6	BA	India	250,738	Quarterfinals	Qualified as ranking (overall)
7	BA	Malaysia	228,016	Semifinals	Qualified as BA semifinalists
8	BA	South Korea	227,609	Semifinals	Qualified as BA semifinalists
9	BA	Thailand	200,628	Quarterfinals	Qualified as host country
10	BA	Hong Kong	199,152	Quarterfinals	
11	BE	England	155,314	Runner-up	Qualified as BE semifinalists
12	BE	Russia	134,954	Quarterfinals	Qualified by ranking (Europe)
13	BE	Germany	128,022	Semifinals	Qualified as BE semifinalists
14	BE	France	121,988	Semifinals	Qualified as BE semifinalists
15	BE	Netherlands	105,220		
16	BPA	Canada	91,463	Winner	Qualified as the winner of BPA
17	BA	Vietnam	88,831		
18	BE	Scotland	76,251		
19	BE	Poland	71,420	Quarterfinals	
20	BE	Finland	70,414	Quarterfinals	
21	BA	Singapore	62,782	Group stage	
22	BE	Italy	61,206	Group stage	
23	BO	Australia	60,230	Winner	Qualified as the winner of BO
24	BE	Spain	59,712	Group stage	
25	BE	Ireland	58,095	Group stage	
26	BPA	Guatemala	56,560		
27	BPA	Mexico	56,040		
28	BPA	Peru	53,476	4th place	
29	BPA	United States	53,044	Runner-up	
30	BCA	Mauritius	52,890	Semifinals	
31	BPA	Brazil	51,340		
32	BE	Austria	48,479	Group stage	
33	BE	Belgium	48,055	Group stage	
34	BE	Israel	47,146	Group stage	
35	BO	New Zealand	46,584	Runner-up	
36	BCA	Egypt	46,561	Quarterfinals	
37	BE	Czech Republic	46,559	Quarterfinals	
38	BE	Bulgaria	46,166	Group stage	
39	BPA	Cuba	45,420		
40	BE	Ukraine	44,319	Group stage	
41	BCA	Nigeria	43,121	Runner-up	
42	BE	Sweden	42,340		
43	BA	Sri Lanka	40,502		
44	BA	Jordan	39,650		
45	BE	Estonia	38,916	Group stage	
46	BE	Slovakia	35,546	Group stage	
47	BE	Turkey	35,297	Group stage	
48	BPA	Jamaica	33,127	3rd place	
49	BE	Norway	30,989	Group stage	
50	BE	Croatia	30,982	Group stage	
50+ participants
51	BE	Hungary	30,872	Group stage	
52	BE	Portugal	29,957	Group stage	
55	BCA	Algeria	25,581	Winner	Qualified as the winner of BCA
56	BPA	Dominican Republic	23,962	5th place	
58	BCA	Ghana	21,417	Semifinals	
59	BE	Luxembourg	20,693	Group stage	
60	BPA	Trinidad and Tobago	20,415	7th place	
61	BA	Nepal	17,019	Group stage	
62	BCA	Zambia	15,353	Quarterfinals	
63	BA	Philippines	14,898	Group stage	
66	BPA	Barbados	13,118	6th place	
67	BCA	Ivory Coast	12,635	Group stage	
69	BE	Azerbaijan	12,480	Group stage	
71	BO	Tahiti	11,523	3rd place	
75	BCA	Morocco	9,653	Quarterfinals	
76	BE	Iceland	9,617	Group stage	
77	BCA	Cameroon	7,762	Quarterfinals	
82	BCA	Zimbabwe	7,100	Group stage	
83	BCA	Seychelles	7,035	Group stage	
84	BA	Maldives	7,010	Group stage	
92	BO	Fiji	5,502	4th place	
93	BA	Myanmar	5,223	Group stage	
94	BE	Lithuania	5,106	Group stage	
102	BA	Kazakhstan	3,605	Group stage	
109	BCA	Tunisia	2,000	Group stage	
113	BE	Greenland	1,480	Group stage	
114	BE	Latvia	1,397	Group stage	
