= MC Oran (disambiguation) =

MC Oran is an Algerian football club.

MC Oran (نادي مولودية وهران) may also refer to:

- MC Oran (basketball)
- MC Oran (handball)
