= 2013–14 Algerian Basketball Cup =

2014 Coupe d'Algérie
Tournament details
- Arena: Hacène Harcha Arena; Algiers
- Dates: 7 June 2014

Awards and statistics

The 2013–14 Algerian Basketball Cup is the 45th edition of the Algerian Basketball Cup. It was managed by the FABB and was held in Algiers, in the Hacène Harcha Arena on June 7, 2014.

== Round of 32 ==
Date	Team 1	Team 2	Score	
24 January 2014	ASM Blida	USM Blida	-	Blida
24 January 2014	MC Saida	CRB Dar Beida	-	Mascara
24 January 2014	COBB Oran	OMB Bel Abbès	-	Mascara
24 January 2014	O.SI Mustapha	IRB Bordj Bou Arreridj	-	Dar El Beïda
24 January 2014	CSM Constantine	WA Boufarik	-	Bordj Bou Arreridj
24 January 2014	JS Réghaia	JS Kabylie	-	salle omnisports de Staouéli
24 January 2014	ACB Tighenif	GCB Mascara	-	Mascara
24 January 2014	MT El Eulma	IRC Annaba	-	Dar El Beïda
24 January 2014	OC Birmouradrais	OMS Miliana	-	Tipaza
24 January 2014	MS Cherchell	AS Blida	-	Tipaza
24 January 2014	USM Sétif	NA Hussein Dey	-	Tizi Ouzou
24 January 2014	AB Skikda	CSMBB Ouargla	-	Batna
24 January 2014	ASS Oum Bouaghi	NB Staoueli	-	Bordj Bou Arreridj
24 January 2014	OSBB Arréridj	O.Médéa	-	Tizi Ouzou
24 January 2014	Olympique Batna	Afak Moustaganem	-	salle omnisports de Staouéli

== Round of 16 ==
Date	Team 1	Team 2	Score	
9 March 2014	CSM Constantine	MS Cherchell	68-55	Bordj Bou Arreridj
9 March 2014	MT El Eulma	USM Sétif	77-86	M'Sila
9 March 2014	OMS Miliana	COBB Oran	64-57	Mascara
9 March 2014	AB Skikda	IRB Bordj Bou Arreridj	65-83	El Eulma
9 March 2014	GS Pétroliers	USM Blida	66-53	salle omnisports de Staouéli
9 March 2014	NB Staoueli	CRB Dar Beida	75-92	Hydra
9 March 2014	Olympique Batna	ACB Tighenif	78-65	Dar El Beïda
9 March 2014	JS Réghaia	O.Médéa	43-57	Hydra

== Bracket ==
Quarterfinals; 4 May
GS Pétroliers	80
CRB Dar Beida	76
USM Sétif	83
IRB Bordj Bou Arreridj	82
CSM Constantine	62
Olympique Batna	56
OMS Miliana	75
O.Médéa	54

Semifinals ? May
OMS Miliana
CSM Constantine
GS Pétroliers
USM Sétif

Final; 7 June
CSM Constantine	59
GS Pétroliers	70

== Final ==
7 June 2014	CSM Constantine	59–70	GS Pétroliers	Algiers
16:00 (CET)	Scoring by quarter: 13–17, 11–21, 19–18, 16–14
			Pts: Walid Hamma 13; Asts: Walid Hamma 10	Arena: Hacène Harcha Arena; Attendance: , Referees: , ,
