= USM Blida (basketball) =

- Leagues: Super Division
- Founded: October 18, 1949
- Arena: Salle Hocine Chalane, Blida
- Location: Blida, Algeria
- Team colors: Green, White
- President: Abdelhakim Temmar
- Head coach: Ahmed Bendjabou

Union Sportive Madinet Blida (basketball) (Arabic: الاتحاد الرياضي لمدينة البليدة لكرة السلة), referred to as USMB for a short, is a basketball club based in Blida, Algeria that played in the Algerian Basketball Championship the team founded on october 18, 1949.

== History ==
=== Foundation and Early Years ===
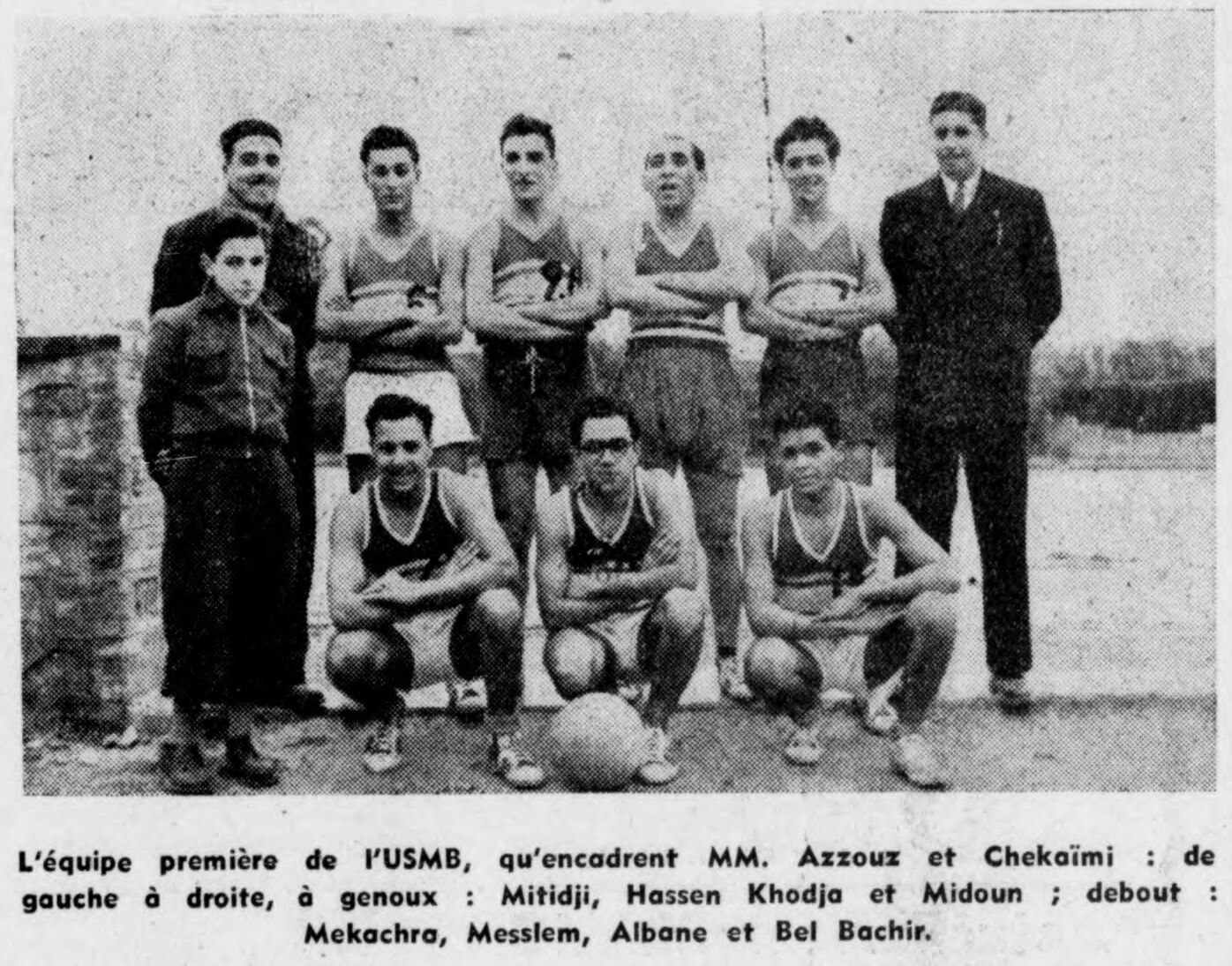
USM Blida first basketball team in 1951, coached by Mr. Azzouz and Mr. Chekaimi: From Left to Right: Sitting: Mitidji, Hassen Khodja, and Midoun. Stand Up Mekachra, Messlem, Albane, and Bel Bachir.

The basketball section of Union Sportive Musulmane de Blida (USMB) was officially established on October 18, 1949, under registration number 8.008. It was founded through the initiative of two active club officials, including the club’s president, Mr. Messlem, who also oversaw the football first team. The role of general secretary was entrusted to Mr. Hassen Khodja, widely known for his dedication and commitment to the club.

=== Early Development and Structure ===
In its early stages, the section consisted of 16 players, most of whom were beginners in the sport. Training sessions were led by Mr. Albane and held once a week on Thursdays. This limited frequency was due to the fact that many of the players were still students and had little free time during the day.

The section faced numerous challenges in its formative years, including:

The departure of key players, such as Touabti and Ali Pacha, who left the city to pursue their studies.

The temporary inclusion of football players from the club to fill team rosters during competitions.

A lack of referees during league matches, which often disadvantaged the team.

Financial difficulties, which were partially alleviated thanks to the football section’s support, providing access to the field and club facilities. Despite these challenges, Mr. Messlem expressed his intention to fully dedicate himself to the role of section president in the following season. His goal was to build and train a team composed mainly of young players, with the hope of regularly bringing pride to the club through improved performances.

== Roster (Men) ==
Note: Flags indicate national team eligibility at FIBA-sanctioned events. Players may hold other non-FIBA nationalities not displayed.

USM Blida roster
Players
Coaches

Pos.	No.	Nat.	Name	Ht.	Age
	0	(Algeria)	Chilegue, Faiz
G/F	1	(Algeria)	Koob, Mossâab	1.94 m (6 ft 4 in)	23 – 1 March 2003
	2	(Algeria)	Boudoumi, Mohamed
	3	(Algeria)	Belhouchet, Mohamed Moncef	1.93 m (6 ft 4 in)
	4	(Algeria)	Dhorbane, Ayemn
	5	(Algeria)	Boulesnane, Azeddine
	8	(Algeria)	Debbi, Abdelkrim	1.98 m (6 ft 6 in)	27 – 31 August 1998
	10	(Algeria)	Benyahia, Benyoucef
	11	(Algeria)	Zahaf, Mohamed
SF	24	(Algeria)	Ghalmi, Salah Eddine	1.92 m (6 ft 4 in)	21 – 9 November 2004
	33	(Algeria)	Zidouni, Mohamed	1.75 m (5 ft 9 in)	23 – 19 May 2003
	66	(Algeria)	Laichi, Ali

Head coach

- (Algeria) Ahmed Bendjabou

Assistant coach(es)

- (Algeria) Mustapha Redouane Refik

Legend

- (C) Team captain
- (I) Import player
- Injured

== Statistics ==
=== Season by season ===
Season	Regular season						Playoffs	Algerian Cup	International	
Season	Division	Pos	Pts	P	W	L	Playoffs	Algerian Cup	International	
1989–90								Semi-final		
1990–91								Round of 16		
1991–92								Quarter finals		
1992–93								Round of 16		
1993–94								Round of 16		
1994–95										
1995–96										
1996–97	Nationale A	10th	17	16	1	17		Quarter finals		
1997–98								Round of 32		
1998–99										
1999–00	Nationale A	11th	24	22	2	20				
2011–12	Super Division A	9th	43	30	13	17	—N/a	Round of 32		
2012–13	Super Division A	3rd	28	18	10	8	6th	Round of 16		
2013–14	Super Division A	10th	21	18	3	15	Not qualify	Round of 16		
2014–15	Super Division A	11th	28	24	6	18	Not qualify			
2015–16	Super Division A	11th	33	26	7	19	Not qualify			
2016–17	Super Division A	7th	14	12	2	10	Not qualify	Quarter finals		
2017–18	National 1	6th	48	30	18	12	8th	Round of 16		
2018–19	National 1							Runner-up		
2019–20	National 1	Canceled (Note: On March 15, 2020, the Ministry of Youth and Sports decided to stop the season due to the COVID-19 pandemic in Algeria.)								
2020–21	National 1	Canceled								
2021–22	Super Division							Quarter-finals (Note: The Algerian Basketball Federation (FABB) has decided, exceptionally, to cancel the Algerian Cup for the 2021–22 season and replace it with a Coupe fédérale which only concerns the 20 teams in the Super Division.)	Arab Club Championship	GS
2022–23	Super Division									
2023–24	Super Division	7th	46	30	16	14	Not qualify	Round of 16		
2024–25	Super Division	8th	39	26	13	13	4th	Round of 16		
2025–26	Super Division	5th	42	26	16	10	Quarter-finals	Round of 16		

== Honours ==
=== Men's ===
- Algerian Basketball Cup

Runner-up (1): 2018-19
