= Second Baptist School =

Private school in Houston, Texas, United States

Coordinates: 29.758041°N 95.498539°W

Information
- Religious affiliation: Baptists
- Established: 1946; 80 years ago
- Grades: K-12
- Website: www.secondbaptistschool.org

Second Baptist School is a private primary and secondary Baptist Christian school in the Memorial area of Houston, Texas, United States.

== History ==
It was founded in 1946 by the Second Baptist Church of Houston. The school has access to nearly 1,000,000 square feet (100,000 m^{2}) of educational and recreational facilities on a 56-acre (230,000 m^{2}), Memorial area campus.

== Notable alumni ==
- Ted Cruz (Class of 1988), United States Senator from Texas
- Glenn January (Class of 2001), CFL player
- Aaron Thompson (Class of 2005), Major League Baseball player
- Jia Tolentino (Class of 2005), writer for The New Yorker
- George Williams (Class of 2008), basketball player

== See also ==
- Christianity in Houston
