= 2023–24 Algerian Basketball Championship =

Super Division
- Season: 2023–24
- Duration: 7 October 2023 – 14 May 2024 (play-in tournament); 31 May – 22 June 2024 (playoffs); 27 May – 4 June 2024 (Playdowns); 28 June – 2 July 2024 (Finals)
- Games played: 240
- Teams: 16

Regular season
- Top seed: WO Boufarik
- Relegated: CRB Dar Beida; ASS Oum El Bouaghi; US Sétif; PS El Eulma

Finals
- Champions: WO Boufarik (10th title)
- Runners-up: TRA Draria
- Finals MVP: Rabah Zitoun

Records
- Biggest home win: WO Boufarik 131–51 ASS Oum El Bouaghi (10 November 2023)
- Biggest away win: ASS Oum El Bouaghi 53–102 USM Alger (17 February 2024)
- Highest scoring: PS El Eulma 97–95 WO Boufarik (10 May 2024)
- Winning streak: 18 games MC Alger
- Losing streak: 17 games ASS Oum El Bouaghi
- All statistics correct as of May 14, 2024.

The 2023–24 Super Division (62nd edition), Algeria's top tier basketball club competition, ran from October 7, 2023, through May 14, 2024. President of the Algerian Basketball Federation Rabah Bouarifi, said that the competition system has been changed, as it will be held in one group consisting of 16 teams instead of two groups, each group consisting of nine teams, as was the case last season. Another change will be made during the following season, to reach the Super Division of 14 teams only.

== Review ==
The first day of the Super Division did not have any real surprises. True to their ambitions, the championship leaders marked the occasion with a successful first outing. USM Alger reigning Algerian champion, which was to begin the defense of its title against the newly promoted ASS Oum El Bouaghi, did not play due to its participation in the 35th edition of the Arab Club Basketball Championship. At the end of the 2nd round there are now five of them sharing the leadership chair of the Super Division. Indeed, NB Staouel, Rouiba CB, USM Blida, CSC Djisr Kasentina and NA Hussein Dey managed to follow up with a second success in a row, brought from outside, by respectively beating US Sétif (53–67), ASS Oum El Bouaghi (77–87), CR Beni Saf (60–62), PS El Eulma (62–84) and CRB Dar Beida (70–79). On October 18, 2023, The Ministry of Youth and Sports (MJS) announced that it was suspending all sport events “until further notice” in solidarity with the Palestinian people. The suspension was announced the day after a strike on a hospital in Gaza, which has been relentlessly shelling the Gaza Strip since the start of the war sparked on October 7 by the bloody attack. of the Palestinian Islamist movement on its soil.

The Super Division summit between the defending champion USM Alger and its runner-up WO Boufarik, after it was postponed several times finally took place in the Hacène Harcha Arena where USM Alger lost (78–63) after being ahead in the first two quarters, thanks to this performance WO Boufarik totaling 14 points, takes first place in the Super Division standings. The team has a perfect record of seven victories in as many matches. USM Alger with 12 points is positioned third sharing this place with USM Blida. The 23rd day of the Super Division was mainly marked by the fall of the two leaders WO Boufarik and NB Staoueli beaten respectively against NA Hussein Dey and CSC Djasr Kasentina. Traveling in the capital, the Boufarikois lost to NA Husseïn Dey by a small point difference (74–73), in a highly contested match which required the use of overtime to decide between both teams. For its part NB Staouéli fell back into its ways after being dominated by CSC Gué de Constantine (66–54) in the algérois derby.

== Venues and locations ==
=== Promotion and relegation (pre-season) ===
A total of 16 teams will contest the league, including 14 sides from the 2022–23 season and two promoted from the 2022–23 National 1.

Teams promoted from National 1

- Ouled Chebel Basket Ball
- CR Beni Saf

Teams relegated to National 1

- AB Skikda
- ES Cherchell
- IR Bordj Bou Arréridj
- Olympique Batna
- CSMBB Ouargla
- OMS Miliana
Locations of teams for the 2023–24 Algerian Basketball Championship

| Promoted from National 1 |

| Team | Home city | Arena |
|---|---|---|
| WO Boufarik | Boufarik | Salle Moussa Chiraf |
| NB Staouéli | Staoueli | Salle de Staouéli |
| US Sétif | Sétif | Salle 8 Mai 1945 |
| CSC Djasr Kasentina | Djasr Kasentina | |
| NA Hussein Dey | Algiers | Salle Mohamed Handjer |
| TRA Draria | Draria | Salle OMS Ghazali Salem (Ouled Fayet) |
| CR Beni Saf | Hammam Bou Hadjar | Salle OMS Larbi Bendjerid |
| PS El Eulma | El Eulma | Salle Mohamed Sayeh Kechkouchi |
| OS Bordj Bou Arréridj | Bordj Bou Arréridj | Salle omnisports du 18 Février |
| CRB Dar Beida | Dar El Beïda | |
| MC Alger | Hydra | Salle OMS Abdelaziz Ben Tifour |
| USM Alger | Algiers | Salle Rais Hamidou |
| ASS Oum El Bouaghi | Oum El Bouaghi | |
| CB Rouïba | Rouïba | Salle OMS Mohamed Kadiri |
| USM Blida | Blida | Salle Hocine Chalane |
| Ouled Chebel Basket Ball | Ouled Chebel | Salle OMS Boualem Bouhedja |

== Regular season ==
=== League table ===
| Pos | Team | Pld | W | L | GF | GA | GD | Pts | |
|---|---|---|---|---|---|---|---|---|---|
| 1 | WO Boufarik | 30 | 26 | 4 | 2463 | 1962 | +501 | 56 | Advance to playoffs |
| 2 | NB Staouéli | 30 | 22 | 8 | 2202 | 1886 | +316 | 52 | Advance to playoffs |
| 3 | MC Alger | 30 | 24 | 6 | 2073 | 1752 | +321 | 52 (Note: MC Alger were deducted 2 points due to absence from the match against US Sétif and M Ouled Chebel.) | Advance to playoffs |
| 4 | USM Alger | 30 | 20 | 10 | 2205 | 1982 | +223 | 50 | Advance to playoffs |
| 5 | TRA Draria | 30 | 19 | 11 | 2070 | 2014 | +56 | 49 | Advance to playoffs |
| 6 | NA Hussein Dey | 30 | 18 | 12 | 2099 | 1990 | +109 | 48 | Advance to playoffs |
| 7 | USM Blida | 30 | 16 | 14 | 2047 | 1992 | +55 | 46 | Advance to Play down |
| 8 | Rouiba CB | 30 | 17 | 13 | 1917 | 1853 | +64 | 47 | Advance to Play down |
| 9 | CSC Djasr Kasentina | 30 | 14 | 16 | 1961 | 1861 | +100 | 44 | Advance to Play down |
| 10 | US Sétif | 30 | 13 | 17 | 1796 | 1832 | −36 | 43 | Advance to Play down |
| 11 | CR Beni Saf | 30 | 12 | 18 | 1814 | 1894 | −80 | 41 (Note: CR Beni Saf were deducted 1 points due to absence from the match against NB Staoueli.) | Advance to Play down |
| 12 | M Ouled Chebel | 30 | 9 | 21 | 1712 | 2013 | −301 | 39 | Advance to Play down |
| 13 | PS El Eulma | 30 | 9 | 21 | 2059 | 2318 | −259 | 39 | Advance to Play down |
| 14 | OS Bordj Bou Arréridj | 30 | 9 | 21 | 1856 | 2055 | −199 | 39 | Advance to Play down |
| 15 | CRB Dar Beida | 30 | 10 | 20 | 1868 | 2101 | −233 | 39 (Note: CRB Dar Beida were deducted 1 points due to absence from the match against TRA Draria.) | Relegation to National 1 |
| 16 | ASS Oum El Bouaghi | 30 | 2 | 28 | 1929 | 2566 | −637 | 32 | Relegation to National 1 |

First match(es) will be played: May 14, 2024. Source: FABB

=== Results ===
| | AOB | CDB | CBS | CSC | NBS | NAH | MCA | MOC | TRD | OSA | RCB | PSE | USS | UAL | USB | WOB | Rec. |
| ASS Oum El Bouaghi | | 73–69; 2 Dec 6(1) | 62–80; 11 Jan 8(1) | 61–95; 13 Apr 24(2) | 69–86; 26 Mar 22(2) | 47–87; 4 May 28(2) | 63–85; 16 Mar 20(2) | 52–60; 9 Feb 14(1) | 74–88; 24 Nov 4(1) | 71–85; 14 May 30(2) | 77–87; 13 Oct 2(1) | 86–74; 20 Jan 10(1) | 53–72; 30 Jan 12(1) | 53–102; 17 Feb 16(2) | 78–89; 23 Apr 26(2) | 75–84; 27 Feb 18(2) | 2–13 |
| CRB Dar Beida | 82–62; 22 Mar 21(2) | | 36–55; 9 Dec 7(1) | 54–62; 13 Feb 15(1) | 89–86; 10 May 29(2) | 70–79; 13 Oct 2(1) | 76–89; 3 Feb 13(1) | 74–61; 19 Apr 25(2) | 67–73; 14 Mar 20(2) | 60–57; 27 Feb 18(2) | 6–35; 23 Nov 4(1) | 83–68; 30 Mar 23(2) | 65–61; 16 Jan 9(1) | 66–68; 26 Jan 11(1) | 68–83; 17 Feb 16(2) | 74–77; 30 Apr 27(2) | 6–9 |
| CR Beni Saf | 72–69; 2 Avr 23(2) | 70–77; 16 Apr 22(2) | | 46–40; 17 Feb 16(2) | 67–62; 13 Feb 15(1) | 59–64; 27 Feb 18(2) | 63–73; 10 May 29(2) | 57–50; 26 Jan 11(1) | 63–53; 2 Dec 6(1) | 75–63; 24 Nov 4(1) | 51–53; 15 Mar 20(2) | 70–50; 16 Jan 9(1) | 56–61; 19 Apr 25(2) | 68–90; 30 Apr 27(2) | 60–62; 13 Oct 2(1) | 55–60; 3 Feb 13(1) | 7–8 |
| CSC Djasr Kasentina | 113–62; 16 Jan 9(1) | 62–64; 14 May 30(2) | 52–49; 7 Oct 1(1) | | 66–54; 30 Mar 23(2) | 73–63; 23 Apr 26(2) | 51–67; 8 Dec 7(1) | 65–53; 2 Mar 19(2) | 61–68; 9 Feb 14(1) | 50–52; 30 Jan 12(1) | 66–58; 4 May 28(2) | 78–66; 23 Feb 17(2) | 57–47; 10 Nov 3(1) | 66–69; 28 Nov 5(1) | 65–55; 20 Jan 10(1) | 63–65; 21 Mar 21(2) | 9–6 |
| NB Staouéli | 103–62; 8 Dec 7(1) | 95–60; 9 Feb 14(1) | 20–00; 14 May 30(2) | 83–76; 12 Jan 8(1) | | 66–65; 20 Jan 10(1) | 66–68; 21 Mar 21(2) | 98–69; 9 Nov 3(1) | 80–65; 4 May 28(2) | 74–66; 23 Apr 26(2) | 87–57; 30 Jan 12(1) | 85–58; 7 Oct 1(1) | 71–58; 23 Feb 17(2) | 72–68; 2 Mar 19(2) | 81–71; 13 Apr 24(2) | 65–72; 28 Nov 5(1) | 13–2 |
| NA Hussein Dey | 96–70; 3 Feb 13(1) | 63–62; 23 Feb 17(2) | 58–69; 10 Nov 3(1) | 70–64; 26 Jan 11(1) | 69–77; 19 Apr 25(2) | | 79–74; 16 Jan 9(1) | 86–71; 21 Mar 21(2) | 74–72; 7 Oct 1(1) | 64–47; 9 Feb 14(1) | 63–71; 14 May 30(2) | 71–47; 2 Mar 19(2) | 59–68; 28 Nov 5(1) | 59–74; 7 Dec 7(1) | 62–58; 30 Apr 27(2) | 74–73; 30 Mar 23(2) | 10–5 |
| MC Alger | 96–62; 28 Nov 5(1) | 86–87; 4 May 28(2) | 78–43; 9 Feb 14(1) | 82–73; 26 Mar 22(2) | 58–55; 2 Dec 6(1) | 70–46; 13 Apr 24(2) | | 70–51; 23 Feb 17(2) | 73–54; 30 Jan 12(1) | 79–55; 20 Jan 10(1) | 75–57; 23 Apr 26(2) | 91–62; 14 May 30(2) | 00–20; 7 Oct 1(1) | 68–71; 10 Nov 3(1) | 56–50; 12 Jan 8(1) | 64–57; 2 Mar 19(2) | 12–3 |
| M Ouled Chebel | 69–58; 10 May 29(2) | 67–66; 20 Jan 10(1) | 62–67; 23 Apr 26(2) | 64–77; 23 Nov 4(1) | 67–87; 27 Feb 18(2) | 63–71; 2 Dec 6(1) | 20–00; 13 Oct 2(1) | | 59–67; 13 Apr 24(2) | 45–44; 26 Mar 22(2) | 60–72; 12 Jan 8(1) | 67–61; 30 Jan 12(1) | 54–50; 4 May 28(2) | 58–57; 13 Feb 15(1) | 50–60; 14 Mar 20(2) | 59–82; 17 Feb 16(2) | 7–8 |
| TRA Draria | 82–76; 2 Mar 19(2) | 20–00; 28 Nov 5(1) | 76–72; 22 Mar 21(2) | 74–68; 10 May 29(2) | 62–77; 3 Feb 13(1) | 79–68; 17 Feb 16(2) | 54–74; 30 Apr 27(2) | 75–49 (Note: On January 16, 2024 The game between TRA Draria and M Ouled Chebel was stopped in the fourth quarter with a result 52–50, to be repeated on January 23rd.); 23 Jan 9(1) | | 80–73; 13 Oct 2(1) | 78–73; 9 Mar 18(2) | 68–58; 8 Dec 7(1) | 64–51; 30 Mar 23(2) | 72–78; 19 Apr 25(2) | 66–65; 13 Feb 15(1) | 69–66 (Note: On January 26, 2024 The game was stopped at the end of the second quarter with a score of 31–45 for WO Boufarik. Later the match will be replayed in Rouiba on February 20, 2024.); 20 Feb 11(1) | 12–3 |
| OS Bordj Bou Arréridj | 75–50; 13 Feb 15(1) | 95–59; 10 Nov 3(1) | 84–80; 2 Mar 19(2) | 55–52; 30 Apr 27(2) | 58–70; 26 Jan 11(1) | 66–90; 10 May 29(2) | 60–75; 19 Apr 25(2) | 54–51; 8 Dec 7(1) | 50–59; 23 Feb 17(2) | | 53–82; 7 Oct 1(1) | 65–79; 28 Nov 5(1) | 45–48; 22 Mar 21(2) | 55–78; 30 Mar 23(2) | 68–66; 3 Feb 13(1) | 50–66; 16 Jan 9(1) | 6–9 |
| CB Rouiba | 82–52; 23 Feb 17(2) | 74–60; 2 Mar 19(2) | 56–46; 28 Nov 5(1) | 76–54; 3 Feb 13(1) | 51–68; 30 Apr 27(2) | 56–70; 13 Feb 15(1) | 47–61; 26 Jan 11(1) | 71–43; 30 Mar 23(2) | 74–72; 9 Nov 3(1) | 60–57; 17 Feb 16(2) | | 66–61; 22 Mar 21(2) | 64–59; 8 Dec 7(1) | 71–62; 16 Jan 9(1) | 71–53; 10 May 29(2) | 50–74; 19 Apr 25(2) | 11–4 |
| PS El Eulma | 73–65; 19 Apr 25(2) | 78–65; 12 Jan 8(1) | 77–78; 12 Apr 24(2) | 62–84; 13 Oct 2(1) | 66–81; 17 Feb 16(2) | 77–87; 24 Nov 4(1) | 60–85; 13 Feb 15(1) | 63–64; 30 Apr 27(2) | 81–86; 26 Mar 22(2) | 72–68; 15 Mar 20(2) | 83–75; 2 Dec 6(1) | | 67–63; 26 Jan 11(1) | 76–71; 3 Feb 13(1) | 66–68; 27 Feb 18(2) | 97–95 (OT); 10 May 29(2) | 7–8 |
| US Sétif | 76–64; 30 Apr 27(2) | 71–72; 12 Apr 24(2) | 72–43; 20 Jan 10(1) | 41–60; 27 Feb 18(2) | 53–67; 13 Oct 2(1) | 60–58; 15 Mar 20(2) | 65–73; 17 Feb 16(2) | 90–57; 3 Feb 13(1) | 76–73; 12 Jan 8(1) | 69–68; 2 Dec 6(1) | 38–37; 16 Apr 22(2) | 73–79; 23 Apr 26(2) | | 70–80; 10 May 29(2) | 55–51; 24 Nov 4(1) | 59–71; 13 Feb 15(1) | 8–7 |
| USM Alger | 90–63; 19 Nov 1(1) | 81–51; 23 Apr 26(2) | 73–54; 30 Jan 12(1) | 64–50; 14 Mar 20(2) | 63–55; 23 Nov 4(1) | 70–81; 26 Mar 22(2) | 45–61 (Note: The match was originally to be played on 27 February 2024, 5:00 p.m, but it was postponed due to rain entering the Salle Rais Hamidou. The sports commission decides that the match is to be replayed at the opponent's home (MC Alger) at the Salle omnisport Abdelaziz Ben Tifour in Hydra on March 8, 2024 at 4:00 p.m. "Art 20 of the special regulations 2023–24". MC Alger is responsible for organizing the meeting and must put in place all the necessary arrangements for the smooth running of the game.); 8 Mar 18(2) | 77–65; 14 May 30(2) | 75–65; 20 Jan 10(1) | 79–62; 12 Jan 8(1) | 86–75; 12 Apr 24(2) | 97–61; 4 May 28(2) | 67–64; 9 Feb 14(1) | | 63–75; 2 Dec 6(1) | 63–78; 9 Jan 2(1) | 11–4 |
| USM Blida | 80–69; 26 Jan 11(1) | 63–29; 7 Oct 1(1) | 67–66; 23 Feb 17(2) | 56–54; 19 Apr 25(2) | 64–67; 16 Jan 9(1) | 62–59; 30 Jan 12(1) | 65–69; 30 Mar 23(2) | 67–52; 28 Nov 5(1) | 81–83; 14 May 30(2) | 86–89; 4 May 28(2) | 73–56; 9 Feb 14(1) | 74–69; 10 Nov 3(1) | 59–53; 2 Mar 19(2) | 85–79; 21 Mar 21(2) | | 86–95; 7 Dec 7(1) | 10–5 |
| WO Boufarik | 131–51; 10 Nov 3(1) | 87–77; 30 Jan 12(1) | 94–80; 4 May 28(2) | 81–64; 2 Dec 6(1) | 69–64; 15 Mar 20(2) | 75–64; 12 Jan 8(1) | 93–78; 23 Nov 4(1) | 95–52; 7 Oct 1(1) | 84–73; 23 Apr 26(2) | 86–37; 13 Apr 24(2) | 65–60; 20 Jan 10(1) | 110–68; 9 Feb 14(1) | 98–53; 14 May 30(2) | 83–65; 23 Feb 17(2) | 97–73; 26 Mar 22(2) | | 15–0 |
| Record | 0–15 | 4–11 | 5–10 | 5–10 | 9–6 | 8–7 | 12–3 | 2–13 | 7–8 | 3–12 | 6–9 | 2–13 | 5–10 | 9–6 | 6–9 | 11–4 | |

- Note: Small number and number in brackets indicate round number and leg, respectively

=== Clubs season-progress ===
| Team ╲ Round | 1 | 2 | 3 | 4 | 5 | 6 | 7 | 8 | 9 | 10 | 11 | 12 | 13 | 14 | 15 | 16 | 17 | 18 | 19 | 20 | 21 | 22 | 23 | 24 | 25 | 26 | 27 | 28 | 29 | 30 |
|---|---|---|---|---|---|---|---|---|---|---|---|---|---|---|---|---|---|---|---|---|---|---|---|---|---|---|---|---|---|---|
| ASS Oum El Bouaghi | L | L | L | L | L | W | L | L | L | W | L | L | L | L | L | L | L | L | L | L | L | L | L | L | L | L | L | L | L | L |
| CRB Dar Beida | L | L | L | L | L | L | L | L | W | L | L | L | L | L | L | L | L | W | L | L | W | W | W | W | W | L | L | W | W | W |
| CR Beni Saf | L | L | W | W | L | W | W | W | W | L | W | L | L | L | W | W | L | L | L | L | L | L | W | W | L | W | L | L | L | L |
| CSC Djasr Kasentina | W | W | W | W | L | L | L | L | W | W | L | L | L | L | W | L | W | W | W | L | L | L | W | W | L | W | L | W | L | L |
| NB Staouéli | W | W | W | L | L | L | W | W | W | W | W | W | W | W | L | W | W | W | W | L | L | W | L | W | W | W | W | W | L | W |
| NA Hussein Dey | W | W | L | W | L | W | L | L | W | L | W | L | W | W | W | L | W | W | W | L | W | W | W | L | L | L | W | W | W | L |
| MC Alger | L | L | L | L | W | W | W | W | L | W | W | W | W | W | W | W | W | W | W | W | W | W | W | W | W | W | W | L | W | W |
| M Ouled Chebel | L | W | L | L | L | L | L | L | L | W | L | W | L | W | W | L | L | L | L | L | L | W | L | L | L | L | W | W | W | L |
| TRA Draria | L | W | L | W | W | L | W | L | W | L | W | L | L | W | W | W | W | W | W | W | W | W | W | W | L | L | L | L | W | W |
| OS Bordj Bou Arréridj | L | L | W | L | L | L | W | L | L | L | L | W | W | L | W | L | L | L | W | L | L | L | L | L | L | L | W | W | L | W |
| CB Rouiba | W | W | W | W | W | L | W | W | W | L | L | L | W | L | L | W | W | L | W | W | W | L | W | L | L | L | L | L | W | W |
| PS El Eulma | L | L | L | L | W | W | L | W | L | L | W | L | W | L | L | L | L | L | L | W | L | L | L | L | W | W | L | L | W | L |
| US Sétif | W | L | L | W | W | W | L | W | L | W | L | W | W | L | L | L | L | L | L | W | W | W | L | L | L | L | W | L | L | L |
| USM Alger | W | L | W | W | W | L | W | W | L | W | W | W | L | W | L | W | L | L | L | W | L | L | W | W | W | W | W | W | W | W |
| USM Blida | W | W | W | L | W | W | L | L | L | L | W | W | L | W | L | W | W | W | W | W | W | L | L | L | W | W | L | L | L | L |
| WO Boufarik | W | W | W | W | W | W | W | W | W | W | L | W | W | W | W | W | W | W | L | W | W | W | L | W | W | W | W | W | L | W |

Updated to match(es) played on May 14, 2024. Source:
W = Win; L = Lose

== Playoffs ==
=== Playoffs table ===
| Pos | Team | Pld | W | L | GF | GA | GD | Pts | |
|---|---|---|---|---|---|---|---|---|---|
| 1 | WO Boufarik | 5 | 5 | 0 | 402 | 366 | +36 | 10 | Qualification to the Super Division final |
| 2 | TRA Draria | 5 | 3 | 2 | 395 | 369 | +26 | 8 | Qualification to the Super Division final |
| 3 | MC Alger | 5 | 3 | 2 | 342 | 318 | +24 | 8 | |
| 4 | NB Staouéli | 5 | 3 | 2 | 382 | 351 | +31 | 8 | |
| 5 | USM Alger | 5 | 1 | 4 | 370 | 396 | −26 | 6 | |
| 6 | NA Hussein Dey | 5 | 0 | 5 | 348 | 439 | −91 | 5 | |

First match(es) will be played: June 22, 2024. Source:

==== First playoff ====
The first day of the first Super Division play-off tournament played in Staouéli, was marked by the victory of WO Boufarik, TRA Draria and MC Alger. These three teams started the second phase of the championship in the best possible way, in order to be among the first two in the ranking to compete in the final of the Super Division (round trip), at the end of the two play-offs tournaments. MC Alger and WO Boufarik confirmed their good start, recording a second success during the 2nd day of the play-offs. For its part, NB Staouéli relaunched itself in the race for the qualifying to the Super Division final after inflicting its second defeat in a row on the defending champion USM Alger.

| May 31, 2024 Round 1 | WO Boufarik | 85–78 | USM Alger | Staoueli |
| 15:00 | Scoring by quarter: 20–21, 23–24, 23–10, 19–23 |
| | Pts: Redouane Mimouni 15; Rebs: Mohamed Seddik Touati 9 Asts: Four players 4 | Boxscore | Pts: Nabil Saidi 15; Rebs: Lotfi Adrar 6 Asts: Tarek Redouane 5 | Arena: Salle de Staouéli; Referees: Mohamed Houari Benmendil, Abderezak Fouchene |

| May 31, 2024 Round 1 | NA Hussein Dey | 73–91 | TRA Draria | Staoueli |
| 17:00 | Scoring by quarter: 24–24, 19–18, 15–33, 15–16 |
| | Pts: Two players 19; Rebs: Omar Belliche 13; Asts: Two players 5 | Boxscore | Pts: Amine Bensalah 21; Rebs: Amine Bensalah 12; Asts: Three players 5 | Arena: Salle de Staouéli; Referees: Mhamed Berrah, Mouaadh Harrache |

| May 31, 2024 Round 1 | NB Staouéli | 58–59 | MC Alger | Staoueli |
| 19:00 | Scoring by quarter: 10–20, 18–14, 12–12, 18–13 |
| | Pts: Hichem Dahkakene 20; Rebs: Zakaria Matoub 19; Asts: Abderraouf Benghiri 4 | Boxscore | Pts: Oussama Aggoun 18; Rebs: Ramzi Merahi 12; Asts: Ramzi Merahi 5 | Arena: Salle de Staouéli; Referees: Anis Bennani, Mohamed Bouarifi |

| June 1, 2024 Round 2 | MC Alger | 78–58 | NA Hussein Dey | Staoueli |
| 15:00 | Scoring by quarter: 17–14, 21–18, 18–11, 22–15 |
| | Pts: Ramzi Merahi 18; Rebs: Mustapha Adrar 12; Asts: Mohamed Zaki Guemat 6 | Boxscore | Pts: Two players 13; Rebs: Omar Belliche 14; Asts: Rayan Hamdi 3 | Arena: Salle de Staouéli; Referees: Anis Bennani, Mohamed Houari Benmendil |

| June 1, 2024 Round 2 | TRA Draria | 80–81 | WO Boufarik | Staoueli |
| 17:00 | Scoring by quarter: 23–20, 19–23, 17–22, 21–16 |
| | Pts: Amine Bensalah 23; Rebs: Amine Bensalah 14; Asts: Fayçal Zerouk Belkhodja 4 | Boxscore | Pts: Kadour Métidji 14; Rebs: Mohamed Seddik Touati 9 Asts: Two players 5 | Arena: Salle de Staouéli; Referees: Mohamed Bouarifi, Abderezak Fouchene |

| June 1, 2024 Round 2 | USM Alger | 67–75 | NB Staouéli | Staoueli |
| 19:00 | Scoring by quarter: 16–20, 18–15, 19–19, 14–21 |
| | Pts: Zakaria Guezout 23; Rebs: Zakaria Guezout 12; Asts: Two players 5 | Boxscore | Pts: Hichem Dahkakene 31; Rebs: Abderraouf Benghiri 10; Asts: Hichem Dahkakene 6 | Arena: Salle de Staouéli; Referees: Mhamed Berrah, Mouaadh Harrache |

==== Second playoff ====
MC Alger and WO Boufarik, co-leaders of the Super Division, moved closer to the final after following up with a 3rd success in a row, on the occasion of the 3rd day of the play-offs played in Boufarik. Opposed to the reigning Algerian champion USM Alger in this case, MC Alger inflicted on its neighbor its 3rd defeat in a row in an Algerian derby won with a score of (77–70). For its part, WO Boufarik got the better of NA Hussein Dey in a game which ended with a score of (89–72). WO Boufarik grabbed the first ticket to the final thanks to its victory against NB Staouéli (76–67), in a match counting for the 4th day of the play-offs. For his part, MC Alger ex-co-leader failed to keep up with the pace imposed by the Mitidja guys. The Green and Red, who remain on 3 victories in a row, were inflicted with their first defeat by TRA Draria (61–59) and thus fell to second position in the ranking. TRA Draria will be WO Boufarik’s opponent in the final. The formation of the capital qualified for the first time in its history for this stage of the competition thanks to its victory gleaned, with forceps, against USM Alger but also the defeat of MC Alger recorded against the WOB, on the occasion of the 5th and final day of the play-offs.

| June 20, 2024 Round 3 | NB Staouéli | 81–80 | TRA Draria | Boufarik |
| 15:00 | Scoring by quarter: 21–17, 18–20, 18–18, 24–25 |
| | Pts: Hichem Dahkakene 27; Rebs: Chakib Sedoud 12; Asts: Mohamed Boussaad 5 | Boxscore | Pts: Abdelmalek Aouana 22; Rebs: Abdelmalek Aouana 12; Asts: Fayçal Zerouk Belkhodja 6 | Arena: Moussa Chiraf Arena; Referees: Farid Amrane, Abderezak Fouchene |

| June 20, 2024 Round 3 | MC Alger | 77–70 | USM Alger | Boufarik |
| 17:00 | Scoring by quarter: 25–21, 15–22, 18–20, 19–7 |
| | Pts: Ramzi Merahi 19; Rebs: Mustapha Adrar 12; Asts: Two players 5 | Boxscore | Pts: Nabil Saidi 20; Rebs: Zakaria Guezout 11; Asts: Moussa Bougria 10 | Arena: Moussa Chiraf Arena; Referees: Mhamed Berrah, Sofiane Hammada |

| June 20, 2024 Round 3 | WO Boufarik | 89–72 | NA Hussein Dey | Boufarik |
| 19:00 | Scoring by quarter: 32–22, 17–11, 16–23, 24–16 |
| | Pts: Abdellah Hamdani 17; Rebs: Cherif Djamel Achache 20; Asts: Tarek Hamdani 7 | Boxscore | Pts: Abdelkrim Ziane 14; Rebs: Abdessalem Semrouni 11; Asts: Abdelkrim Ziane 8 | Arena: Moussa Chiraf Arena; Referees: Brahim Ferhani, Mohamed Bouarifi |

| June 21, 2024 Round 4 | NA Hussein Dey | 76–80 | USM Alger | Boufarik |
| 15:00 | Scoring by quarter: 22–30, 14–14, 24–17, 16–19 |
| | Pts: Omar Belliche 18; Rebs: Two players 9 Asts: Mounir Djelili 8 | Boxscore | Pts: Merouane Yahya 23; Rebs: Bouhaous Messaoudi 13; Asts: Bouhaous Messaoudi 9 | Arena: Moussa Chiraf Arena; Referees: Sofiane Hammada, Farid Amrane |

| June 21, 2024 Round 4 | TRA Draria | 61–59 | MC Alger | Boufarik |
| 17:00 | Scoring by quarter: 22–13, 15–20, 13–17, 11–9 |
| | Pts: Amine Bensalah 17; Rebs: Amine Bensalah 9 Asts: Fayçal Zerouk Belkhodja 8 | Boxscore | Pts: Mustapha Adrar 14; Rebs: Mustapha Adrar 7 Asts: Merouane Bourkaib 5 | Arena: Moussa Chiraf Arena; Referees: Mohamed Bouarifi, Abderezak Fouchene |

| June 21, 2024 Round 4 | WO Boufarik | 76–67 | NB Staouéli | Boufarik |
| 19:00 | Scoring by quarter: 17–21, 11–12, 22–21, 26–13 |
| | Pts: Kadour Métidji 25; Rebs: Cherif Djamel Achache 9 Asts: Abdelhalim Kaouane 11 | Boxscore | Pts: Hichem Dahkakene 21; Rebs: Zakaria Matoub 8 Asts: Hichem Dahkakene 7 | Arena: Moussa Chiraf Arena; Referees: Mhamed Berrah, Brahim Ferhani |

| June 22, 2024 Round 5 | NB Staouéli | 101–69 | NA Hussein Dey | Boufarik |
| 15:00 | Scoring by quarter: 31–22, 25–14, 24–12, 21–21 |
| | Pts: Chakib Sedoud 24; Rebs: Chakib Sedoud 19; Asts: Chakib Sedoud 6 | Boxscore | Pts: Samir Sam 19; Rebs: Rayan Hamdi 12; Asts: Mounir Djelili 6 | Arena: Moussa Chiraf Arena; Referees: Mohamed Bouarifi, Abderezak Fouchene |

| June 22, 2024 Round 5 | USM Alger | 75–83(OT) | TRA Draria | Boufarik |
| 17:00 | Scoring by quarter: 16–21, 20–14, 18–11, 16–24, Overtime: 5–13 |
| | Pts: Nabil Saidi 14; Rebs: Two players 10; Asts: Two players 5 | Boxscore | Pts: Adel Mokrani 26; Rebs: Two players 9 Asts: Amine Bensalah 6 | Arena: Moussa Chiraf Arena; Referees: Mhamed Berrah, Farid Amrane |

| June 22, 2024 Round 5 | MC Alger | 69–71 | WO Boufarik | Boufarik |
| 19:00 | Scoring by quarter: 15–16, 15–23, 13–8, 26–24 |
| | Pts: Mustapha Adrar 14; Rebs: Abdesslem Dekkiche 12; Asts: Ramzi Merahi 6 | Boxscore | Pts: Mohamed Seddik Touati 22; Rebs: Mohamed Seddik Touati 15; Asts: Abdelhalim Kaouane 8 | Arena: Moussa Chiraf Arena; Referees: Sofiane Hammada, Brahim Ferhani |

=== Statistical leaders ===
==== Points ====
| Pos | Player | Club | PPG |
|---|---|---|---|
| 1 | (Algeria) Hichem Dahkakene | NB Staouéli | 24.4 |
| 2 | (Algeria) Adel Mokrani | TRA Draria | 16.2 |
| 3 | (Algeria) Amine Bensalah | TRA Draria | 15.6 |
| 4 | (Algeria) Kadour Métidji | WO Boufarik | 14.8 |
| 5 | (Algeria) Nabil Saidi | USM Alger | 13.8 |

==== Rebounds ====
| Pos | Player | Club | RPG |
|---|---|---|---|
| 1 | (Algeria) Amine Bensalah | TRA Draria | 10.2 |
| 2 | (Algeria) Chakib Sedoud | NB Staouéli | 10 |
| 3 | (Algeria) Mohamed Seddik Touati | WO Boufarik | 9.4 |
| 4 | (Algeria) Omar Belliche | NA Hussein Dey | 9 |
| 5 | (Algeria) Mustapha Adrar | MC Alger | 9 |

==== Assists ====
| Pos | Player | Club | APG |
|---|---|---|---|
| 1 | (Algeria) Abdelhalim Kaouane | WO Boufarik | 5.6 |
| 2 | (Algeria) Fayçal Zerouk Belkhodja | TRA Draria | 5.4 |
| 3 | (Algeria) Mounir Djelili | NA Hussein Dey | 4.8 |
| 4 | (Algeria) Amine Bensalah | TRA Draria | 4.4 |
| 5 | (Algeria) Hichem Dahkakene | NB Staouéli | 4.4 |

Source: Super Division

== Finals ==
=== First leg ===
Friday, June 28
19:00

Boxscore

| WO Boufarik | 83–59 | TRA Draria |
Scoring by quarter: 17–8, 14–16, 24–16, 28–19
| Pts: Rabah 17; Rebs: Merahi, Rabah 7 Asts: Kaouane 6 | | Pts: Belkhodja 20; Rebs: Bensalah 7 Asts: Belkhodja 4 |
WO Boufarik leads series, 1–0

Moussa Chiraf Arena, Boufarik
Referees: Hamid Kaddour, Mhamed Berrah, Mohamed Bouarifi

=== Second leg ===
Tuesday, July 2
17:00

Boxscore

| TRA Draria | 41–60 | WO Boufarik |
Scoring by quarter: 10–16, 15–11, 10–17, 6–16
| Pts: Belkhodja 13; Rebs: Bensalah 13; Asts: Belkhodja 3 | | Pts: Métidji 15; Rebs: Métidji 12; Asts: Kaouane 5 |
WO Boufarik wins series, 2–0

Salle de Staouéli, Staoueli
Referees: Sofiane Si Youcef, Anis Bennani, Sofiane Hammada

== Play down ==
=== Group A table ===
| Pos | Team | Pld | W | L | GF | GA | GD | Pts | |
|---|---|---|---|---|---|---|---|---|---|
| 1 | OS Bordj Bou Arréridj | 3 | 3 | 0 | 209 | 196 | +13 | 6 | |
| 2 | Rouiba CB | 3 | 2 | 1 | 183 | 157 | +26 | 5 | |
| 3 | CR Beni Saf | 3 | 1 | 2 | 196 | 214 | −18 | 4 | |
| 4 | US Sétif | 3 | 0 | 3 | 180 | 201 | −21 | 3 | Relegation to National 1 |

First match(es) will be played: May 29, 2024. Source: FABB

==== Group A ====
| May 27, 2024 Round 1 | US Sétif | 65–68 | CR Beni Saf | Rouïba |
| 16:00 | Scoring by quarter: 16–10, 20–25, 10–13, 19–20 |
| | | Boxscore | | Arena: Salle OMS Mohamed Kadiri |

| May 27, 2024 Round 1 | Rouiba CB | 54–56 | OS Bordj Bou Arréridj | Rouïba |
| 18:00 | Scoring by quarter: 13–22, 13–7, 16–14, 12–13 |
| | | Boxscore | | Arena: Salle OMS Mohamed Kadiri |

| May 28, 2024 Round 2 | OS Bordj Bou Arréridj | 78–71 | CR Beni Saf | Rouïba |
| 16:00 | Scoring by quarter: 15–11, 14–24, 25–18, 24–18 |
| | | Boxscore | | Arena: Salle OMS Mohamed Kadiri |

| May 28, 2024 Round 2 | Rouiba CB | 58–44 | US Sétif | Rouïba |
| 18:00 | Scoring by quarter: 12–8, 10–15, 20–16, 16–5 |
| | | Boxscore | | Arena: Salle OMS Mohamed Kadiri |

| May 29, 2024 Round 3 | CR Beni Saf | 57–71 | Rouiba CB | Rouïba |
| 16:00 | Scoring by quarter: 15–20, 15–11, 5–14, 22–26 |
| | | Boxscore | | Arena: Salle OMS Mohamed Kadiri |

| May 29, 2024 Round 3 | US Sétif | 71–75 | OS Bordj Bou Arréridj | Rouïba |
| 14:00 | Scoring by quarter: 18–16, 12–21, 14–21, 27–17 |
| | | Boxscore | | Arena: Salle OMS Mohamed Kadiri |

=== Group B table ===
| Pos | Team | Pld | W | L | GF | GA | GD | Pts | |
|---|---|---|---|---|---|---|---|---|---|
| 1 | CSC Djasr Kasentina | 3 | 2 | 1 | 213 | 184 | +29 | 5 | |
| 2 | USM Blida | 3 | 2 | 1 | 210 | 193 | +17 | 5 | |
| 3 | M Ouled Chebel | 3 | 1 | 2 | 167 | 193 | −26 | 4 | |
| 4 | PS El Eulma | 3 | 1 | 2 | 171 | 191 | −20 | 4 | Relegation to National 1 |

First match(es) will be played: June 4, 2024. Source: FABB

==== Group B ====
| June 2, 2024 Round 1 | CSC Djasr Kasentina | 72–48 | M Ouled Chebel | Blida |
| 16:00 | Scoring by quarter: 22–16, 25–15, 12–14, 13–3 |
| | | Boxscore | | Arena: Hocine Chalane Arena |

| June 2, 2024 Round 1 | USM Blida | 59–65 | PS El Eulma | Blida |
| 18:00 | Scoring by quarter: 20–11, 10–17, 15–19, 14–18 |
| | | Boxscore | | Arena: Hocine Chalane Arena |

| June 3, 2024 Round 2 | PS El Eulma | 52–66 | M Ouled Chebel | Blida |
| 15:00 | Scoring by quarter: 12–17, 12–16, 17–15, 11–18 |
| | | Boxscore | | Arena: Hocine Chalane Arena |

| June 3, 2024 Round 2 | USM Blida | 82–75(OT) | CSC Djasr Kasentina | Blida |
| 17:00 | Scoring by quarter: 11–17, 19–16, 13–13, 13–10, Overtime: 26–19 |
| | | Boxscore | | Arena: Hocine Chalane Arena |

| June 4, 2024 Round 3 | CSC Djasr Kasentina | 66–54 | PS El Eulma | Blida |
| 14:00 | Scoring by quarter: 21–18, 16–14, 16–11, 13–11 |
| | | Boxscore | | Arena: Hocine Chalane Arena |

| June 4, 2024 Round 3 | M Ouled Chebel | 53–69 | USM Blida | Blida |
| 16:00 | Scoring by quarter: 19–25, 11–15, 12–18, 11–11 |
| | | Boxscore | | Arena: Hocine Chalane Arena |
