= Algerian Basketball Cup =

- Sport: Basketball
- First season: 1968
- No. of teams: 32
- Country: Algeria
- Continent: FIBA Africa (Africa)
- Most recent champion: NB Staouéli (4th title) (2024-25)
- Most titles: MC Alger (20 titles)
- Website: www.fabb.org.dz

The Algerian Basketball Cup is an elimination Basketball tournament held annually in Algeria. It is the second most important national title in Algerian basketball after the Algerian Basketball Championship. The competition started apparently in 1968.

== Finals ==
Year	Winners	Score	Runners-up	Venue
1968-69	ASM Oran	53 – 49	AS CFA Alger	Stade ferhani, Bab El Oued
1969-70	Darak El-Watani	69 – 59	RAM Alger	Stade ferhani, Bab El Oued
1970-71	AS PTT Oran	84 – 72	CSS Oran	Stade ferhani, Bab El Oued
1971-72	Darak El-Watani	82 – 73	NAR Alger	Stade ferhani, Bab El Oued
1972-73	Darak El-Watani	35 – 52	CR Staouéli	Stade ferhani, Bab El Oued
1973-74	CS DNC Alger	86 – 62	Darak El-Watani	Stade ferhani, Bab El Oued
1974-75	AS CFA Alger	112 – 108	CS DNC Alger	Stade ferhani, Bab El Oued
1975-76	Darak El-Watani	85 – 78	CS DNC Alger	Hacène Harcha Arena
1976-77	NA Hussein Dey	100 – 98	Darak El-Watani	Hacène Harcha Arena
1977-78	Not played			
1978-79	Darak El-Watani	53 – 48	CS DNC Alger	Hacène Harcha Arena
1979-80	Darak El-Watani	88 – 78	CS DNC Alger	Hacène Harcha Arena
1980-81	Darak El-Watani	77 – 61	NIAD Alger	Hacène Harcha Arena
1981-82	MA Hussein Dey	89 – 82	MP Alger	Hacène Harcha Arena
1982-83	MP Alger	90 – 81	MA Hussein Dey	Hacène Harcha Arena
1983-84	MA Hussein Dey	80 – 74	IRB Alger	Stade Ahmed Ghermoul, Algiers
1984-85	MP Alger	89 – 86	Darak El-Watani	Hacène Harcha Arena
1985-86	MP Alger	74 – 63	IRB Alger	Hacène Harcha Arena
1986-87	WA Boufarik	65 – 64	NIAD Alger	Hacène Harcha Arena
1987-88	IRB Alger	85 – 72	MC Alger	Hacène Harcha Arena
1988-89	MC Alger	77 – 66	USM Alger	Hacène Harcha Arena
1989-90	MC Oran	88 – 84	IRB Alger	Hacène Harcha Arena
1990-91	NA Hussein Dey	63 – 61	MC Oran	Hacène Harcha Arena
1991-92	WA Boufarik	79 – 75	IRB Alger	Hacène Harcha Arena
1992-93	MC Alger	70 – 68	DRB Staouéli	Hacène Harcha Arena
1993-94	WA Boufarik	102 – 96	IRB Alger	Hacène Harcha Arena
1994-95	SR Annaba	88 – 86	MC Alger	Hacène Harcha Arena
1995-96	WA Boufarik	71 – 69	USM Alger	Hacène Harcha Arena
1996-97	SR Annaba	75 – 74	CRB Dar El-Beida	Hacène Harcha Arena
1997-98	WA Boufarik	82 – 62	MC Alger	Hacène Harcha Arena
1998-99	DRB Staouéli	71 – 58	WA Boufarik	Hacène Harcha Arena
1999-00	DRB Staouéli	82 – 81 (aet)	OC Alger	
2000-01	WA Boufarik	72 – 69	MC Alger	Hacène Harcha Arena
2001-02	WA Boufarik	96 – 66	OC Alger	Hacène Harcha Arena
2002-03	MC Alger	80 – 62	SR Annaba	Hacène Harcha Arena
2003-04	MC Alger	89 – 64	WA Rouiba	Hacène Harcha Arena
2004-05	MC Alger	76 – 49	WA Boufarik	Hacène Harcha Arena
2005-06	MC Alger	108 – 68	CRB Dar El-Beida	Hacène Harcha Arena
2006-07	DRB Staouéli	66 – 64	WA Boufarik	Hacène Harcha Arena
2007-08	MC Alger	89 – 68	NB Staouéli	Hacène Harcha Arena
2008-09	GS Pétroliers	95 – 75	AS PTT Alger	Salle Omnisports, Staoueli
2009-10	TBB Blida	68 – 65	AS PTT Alger	Hacène Harcha Arena
2010-11	GS Pétroliers	89 – 46	CRB Dar El-Beida	Hacène Harcha Arena
2011-12	GS Pétroliers	89 – 67	CRB Dar El-Beida	Hacène Harcha Arena
2012-13	GS Pétroliers	73 – 49	CSM Constantine	Hacène Harcha Arena
2013-14	GS Pétroliers	70 – 59	CSM Constantine	Hacène Harcha Arena
2014-15	GS Pétroliers	76 – 66	CRB Dar El-Beida	Hacène Harcha Arena
2015-16	GS Pétroliers	67 – 63	USM Sétif	Hacène Harcha Arena
2016-17	GS Pétroliers	62 – 52	USM Sétif	Hacène Harcha Arena
2017-18	GS Pétroliers	75 – 56	USM Sétif	Hacène Harcha Arena
2018-19	GS Pétroliers	90 – 59	USM Blida	Salle omnisports de Staouéli
2019-20	Not played due to the COVID-19 pandemic			
2020-21	Not played due to the COVID-19 pandemic			
2021-22	WO Boufarik	74 – 60	TRA Draria	Hacène Harcha Arena, Algiers
2022-23	WO Boufarik	74 – 63	CSC Gué de Constantine	Hacène Harcha Arena, Algiers
2023-24	USM Alger	71 – 69	WO Boufarik	La Coupole, Algiers
2024-25	NB Staouéli	59 – 46	USM Alger	La Coupole, Algiers

Rq
MC Alger (ex. MP Alger & GS Pétroliers)
MC Oran (ex. MP Oran)
OC Alger (ex. CS DNC Alger & IRB Alger)
RC Kouba (ex. NAR Alger)
NA Hussein Dey (ex. MA Hussein Dey)
WA Boufarik (ex. WO Boufarik)
NB Staouéli (ex. CR Staouéli & DRB Staouéli)

== Most successful clubs ==
Rank	Club	Champions	Runners-up	Winning seasons
1	MC Alger	20	5	1983, 1985, 1986, 1989, 1993, 2003, 2004, 2005, 2006, 2008, 2009, 2011, 2012, 2013, 2014, 2015, 2016, 2017, 2018, 2019
2	WA Boufarik	9	4	1987, 1992, 1994, 1996, 1998, 2001, 2002, 2022, 2023
3	Darak El-Watani	7	3	1970, 1972, 1973, 1976, 1979, 1980, 1981
4	NB Staouéli	4	3	1999, 2000, 2007, 2025
5	NA Hussein Dey	4	1	1977, 1982, 1984, 1991
6	OC Alger	2	11	1974, 1988
7	SR Annaba	2	1	1995, 1997
8	MC Oran	1	1	1990
8	AS PTT Alger	1	1	2009
8	USM Alger	1	1	2025
11	ASM Oran	1	0	1969
11	AS PTT Oran	1	0	1971
11	AS CFA Alger	1	0	1975
11	TBB Blida	1	0	2010

== Algerian Cup Finals in Detail ==
=== coupe d'Algérie 1998-1999 ===
June 3, 1999
16:00

Report

NB Staouéli	71–58	WO Boufarik
Pts: K.Zaimeddine, Zouaoui, Sekkal (11), Rezig (6), Brahimi (2), El-Hamdani, Berkani (13), Balla (2), Hamaine, Benremdane (13), Saidi (10), A.Zaimeddine (14). - Coach: Ahmed Loubacheria.		Pts: Sahraoui (14), Djellali, Michouma, Kessi, Yahia (2), Aliane (2), Aissaoui, Smail (8), Reggab (3), Chenief (3), Benomari (9), K Mehnaoui (17). - Coach: Karim Rezig.

Hacène Harcha Arena, Algiers
Referees: Boufnik, Ghozali

== See also ==
- Algerian Basketball Championship
- Algerian Women's Basketball Cup
- Algerian Women's Basketball Championship
