= 2018 Badminton Asia Team Championships – Men's team event =

Men's team at the 2018 Badminton Asia Team Championships
- Venue: Sultan Abdul Halim Stadium
- Location: Alor Setar, Kedah, Malaysia
- Dates: 6–11 February 2018
- Nations: 15

Medalists
gold medal	Indonesia
silver medal	China
bronze medal	Malaysia
bronze medal	South Korea

The men's team event at the 2018 Badminton Asia Team Championships took place from 6 to 11 February at the Sultan Abdul Halim Stadium in Alor Setar, Kedah, Malaysia. Indonesia were the defending champions.

== Seeds ==
The seeds were announced on 20 January 2018 based on the BWF World Team Rankings.

1. China (final)
2. Indonesia (champions)
3. Chinese Taipei (group stage)
4. Japan (quarter-finals)
5. India (quarter-finals)
6. South Korea (semi-finals)
7. Malaysia (semi-finals)
8. Hong Kong (quarter-finals)

== Group stage ==
The draw was held on 23 January 2018. The men's team group stages consist of 4 groups: A, B, C and D.

Group A	Group B	Group C	Group D
China (1); Hong Kong (8); Singapore	Japan (4); South Korea (6); Nepal; Kazakhstan	Chinese Taipei (3); Malaysia (7, H); Thailand; Myanmar	Indonesia (2); India (5); Philippines; Maldives

All times are Malaysia Standard Time (UTC+08:00).

=== Group A ===
Pos	Team	Pld	W	L	MF	MA	MD	GF	GA	GD	PF	PA	PD	Pts	Qualification
1	China	2	2	0	10	0	+10	20	2	+18	451	316	+135	2	Knockout stage
2	Hong Kong	2	1	1	5	5	0	12	10	+2	393	399	−6	1	Knockout stage
3	Singapore	2	0	2	0	10	−10	0	20	−20	292	421	−129	0	

Source: TS

==== Hong Kong vs Singapore ====
Hong Kong
5
Stadium Sultan Abdul Halim, Court 1
6 February 2018, 09:00

Singapore
0

			1	2	3
1	(Hong Kong) (Singapore)	Ng Ka Long; Ryan Ng	21; 16	21; 16
2	(Hong Kong) (Singapore)	Lee Chun Hei / Tang Chun Man; Danny Bawa Chrisnanta / Terry Hee	21; 17	22; 20
3	(Hong Kong) (Singapore)	Wong Wing Ki; Elaf Tan	21; 18	21; 13
4	(Hong Kong) (Singapore)	Law Cheuk Him / Or Chin Chung; Lee Jian Liang / Jason Wong	21; 12	21; 15
5	(Hong Kong) (Singapore)	Lee Cheuk Yiu; Joel Koh	21; 14	21; 17

==== China vs Singapore ====
China
5
Stadium Sultan Abdul Halim, Court 1
7 February 2018, 09:00

Singapore
0

			1	2	3
1	(China) (Singapore)	Shi Yuqi; Ryan Ng	21; 16	21; 13
2	(China) (Singapore)	He Jiting / Tan Qiang; Danny Bawa Chrisnanta / Terry Hee	21; 16	21; 17
3	(China) (Singapore)	Qiao Bin; Elaf Tan	21; 10	21; 6
4	(China) (Singapore)	Han Chengkai / Zhou Haodong; Lee Jian Liang / Jason Wong	21; 12	21; 12
5	(China) (Singapore)	Lu Guangzu; Joel Koh	21; 19	21; 13

==== China vs Hong Kong ====
China
5
Stadium Sultan Abdul Halim, Court 1
8 February 2018, 09:00

Hong Kong
0

			1	2	3
1	(China) (Hong Kong)	Shi Yuqi; Ng Ka Long	21; 17	21; 17
2	(China) (Hong Kong)	He Jiting / Tan Qiang; Or Chin Chung / Tang Chun Man	12; 21	21; 15	21; 15
3	(China) (Hong Kong)	Qiao Bin; Wong Wing Ki	21; 11	19; 21	21; 13
4	(China) (Hong Kong)	Han Chengkai / Zhou Haodong; Chang Tak Ching / Yeung Ming Nok	21; 12	21; 14
5	(China) (Hong Kong)	Zhao Junpeng; Lee Cheuk Yiu	21; 19	21; 14

=== Group B ===
Pos	Team	Pld	W	L	MF	MA	MD	GF	GA	GD	PF	PA	PD	Pts	Qualification
1	South Korea	3	3	0	13	2	+11	27	5	+22	644	357	+287	3	Knockout stage
2	Japan	3	2	1	12	3	+9	25	7	+18	618	386	+232	2	Knockout stage
3	Kazakhstan	3	1	2	5	10	−5	10	20	−10	383	548	−165	1	
4	Nepal	3	0	3	0	15	−15	0	30	−30	278	632	−354	0	

Source: TS

==== South Korea vs Nepal ====
South Korea
5
Stadium Sultan Abdul Halim, Court 2
6 February 2018, 14:00

Nepal
0

			1	2	3
1	(South Korea) (Nepal)	Jeon Hyeok-jin; Ratnajit Tamang	21; 6	21; 11
2	(South Korea) (Nepal)	Lee Dong-keun; Sajan Krishna Tamrakar	21; 9	21; 7
3	(South Korea) (Nepal)	Heo Kwang-hee; Bikash Shrestha	21; 4	21; 6
4	(South Korea) (Nepal)	Chung Eui-seok / Kang Min-hyuk; Dipesh Dhami / Ratnajit Tamang	21; 7	21; 5
5	(South Korea) (Nepal)	Choi Sol-gyu / Kim Duk-young; Bikash Shrestha / Sajan Krishna Tamrakar	21; 7	21; 6

==== Japan vs Kazakhstan ====
Japan
5
Stadium Sultan Abdul Halim, Court 3
6 February 2018, 14:00

Kazakhstan
0

			1	2	3
1	(Japan) (Kazakhstan)	Kenta Nishimoto; Dmitriy Panarin	21; 10	21; 10
2	(Japan) (Kazakhstan)	Kanta Tsuneyama; Artur Niyazov	21; 11	21; 9
3	(Japan) (Kazakhstan)	Kento Momota; Khaitmurat Kulmatov	21; 7	21; 4
4	(Japan) (Kazakhstan)	Takuro Hoki / Yugo Kobayashi; Dmitriy Panarin / Ikramzhan Yuldashev	21; 4	21; 11
5	(Japan) (Kazakhstan)	Takeshi Kamura / Keigo Sonoda; Khaitmurat Kulmatov / Artur Niyazov	21; 8	21; 6

==== South Korea vs Kazakhstan ====
South Korea
5
Stadium Sultan Abdul Halim, Court 2
7 February 2018, 14:00

Kazakhstan
0

			1	2	3
1	(South Korea) (Kazakhstan)	Son Wan-ho; Dmitriy Panarin	21; 8	21; 10
2	(South Korea) (Kazakhstan)	Lee Dong-keun; Artur Niyazov	21; 9	21; 7
3	(South Korea) (Kazakhstan)	Heo Kwang-hee; Khaitmurat Kulmatov	21; 9	21; 12
4	(South Korea) (Kazakhstan)	Kim Won-ho / Seo Seung-jae; Dmitriy Panarin / Ikramzhan Yuldashev	21; 8	21; 8
5	(South Korea) (Kazakhstan)	Chung Eui-seok / Kang Min-hyuk; Khaitmurat Kulmatov / Artur Niyazov	21; 8	21; 12

==== Japan vs Nepal ====
Japan
5
Stadium Sultan Abdul Halim, Court 4
7 February 2018, 14:00

Nepal
0

			1	2	3
1	(Japan) (Nepal)	Kazumasa Sakai; Ratnajit Tamang	21; 7	21; 6
2	(Japan) (Nepal)	Kanta Tsuneyama; Sajan Krishna Tamrakar	21; 11	21; 9
3	(Japan) (Nepal)	Kento Momota; Bikash Shrestha	21; 12	21; 11
4	(Japan) (Nepal)	Takuro Hoki / Yugo Kobayashi; Dipesh Dhami / Ratnajit Tamang	21; 7	21; 7
5	(Japan) (Nepal)	Hiroyuki Endo / Yuta Watanabe; Bikash Shrestha / Sajan Krishna Tamrakar	21; 4	21; 8

==== Nepal vs Kazakhstan ====
Nepal
0
Stadium Sultan Abdul Halim, Court 2
8 February 2018, 14:00

Kazakhstan
5

			1	2	3
1	(Nepal) (Kazakhstan)	Ratnajit Tamang; Dmitriy Panarin	6; 21	20; 22
2	(Nepal) (Kazakhstan)	Sajan Krishna Tamrakar; Artur Niyazov	7; 21	10; 21
3	(Nepal) (Kazakhstan)	Bikash Shrestha; Khaitmurat Kulmatov	9; 21	14; 21
4	(Nepal) (Kazakhstan)	Dipesh Dhami / Ratnajit Tamang; Artur Niyazov / Dmitriy Panarin	14; 21	20; 22
5	(Nepal) (Kazakhstan)	Bikash Shrestha / Sajan Krishna Tamrakar; Khatmurat Kulmatov / Ikramzhan Yuldashev	19; 21	9; 21

==== Japan vs South Korea ====
Japan
2
Stadium Sultan Abdul Halim, Court 3
8 February 2018, 14:00

South Korea
3

			1	2	3
1	(Japan) (South Korea)	Kenta Nishimoto; Son Wan-ho	11; 21	21; 19	20; 22
2	(Japan) (South Korea)	Takeshi Kamura / Keigo Sonoda; Kim Won-ho / Seo Seung-jae	21; 15	21; 14
3	(Japan) (South Korea)	Kazumasa Sakai; Jeon Hyeok-jin	17; 21	14; 21
4	(Japan) (South Korea)	Takuro Hoki / Yugo Kobayashi; Choi Sol-gyu / Kim Duk-young	9; 21	9; 21
5	(Japan) (South Korea)	Kento Momota; Heo Kwang-hee	13; 21	21; 18	21; 10

=== Group C ===
Pos	Team	Pld	W	L	MF	MA	MD	GF	GA	GD	PF	PA	PD	Pts	Qualification
1	Malaysia	3	2	1	12	3	+9	25	9	+16	675	484	+191	2	Knockout stage
2	Thailand	3	2	1	10	5	+5	20	11	+9	573	520	+53	2	Knockout stage
3	Chinese Taipei	3	2	1	8	7	+1	19	14	+5	622	576	+46	2	
4	Myanmar	3	0	3	0	15	−15	0	30	−30	340	630	−290	0	

Source: TS

==== Malaysia vs Thailand ====
Malaysia
2
Stadium Sultan Abdul Halim, Court 1
6 February 2018, 19:00

Thailand
3

			1	2	3
1	(Malaysia) (Thailand)	Lee Chong Wei; Khosit Phetpradab	21; 13	21; 9
2	(Malaysia) (Thailand)	Goh V Shem / Tan Wee Kiong; Kittinupong Kedren / Dechapol Puavaranukroh	21; 16	19; 21	20; 22
3	(Malaysia) (Thailand)	Lee Zii Jia; Suppanyu Avihingsanon	21; 14	21; 12
4	(Malaysia) (Thailand)	Ong Yew Sin / Teo Ee Yi; Tinn Isriyanet / Kittisak Namdash	17; 21	11; 21
5	(Malaysia) (Thailand)	Iskandar Zulkarnain Zainuddin; Kantaphon Wangcharoen	13; 21	14; 21

==== Chinese Taipei vs Myanmar ====
Chinese Taipei
5
Stadium Sultan Abdul Halim, Court 2
6 February 2018, 19:00

Myanmar
0

			1	2	3
1	(Chinese Taipei) (Myanmar)	Wang Tzu-wei; Phone Pyae Naing	21; 13	21; 17
2	(Chinese Taipei) (Myanmar)	Lin Yu-hsien; Aung Myo Htoo	21; 19	21; 17
3	(Chinese Taipei) (Myanmar)	Chen Chun-wei; Arkar Phone Myat	21; 11	21; 15
4	(Chinese Taipei) (Myanmar)	Chen Hung-ling / Wang Chi-Lin; Aung Myo Htoo / Chan Win Oo	21; 10	21; 11
5	(Chinese Taipei) (Myanmar)	Lee Jhe-huei / Lee Yang; Arkar Phone Myat / Hein Si Thu Toe	21; 10	21; 15

==== Malaysia vs Myanmar ====
Malaysia
5
Stadium Sultan Abdul Halim, Court 1
7 February 2018, 19:00

Myanmar
0

			1	2	3
1	(Malaysia) (Myanmar)	Lee Zii Jia; Phone Pyae Naing	21; 3	21; 10
2	(Malaysia) (Myanmar)	Soong Joo Ven; Aung Myo Htoo	21; 9	21; 7
3	(Malaysia) (Myanmar)	Iskandar Zulkarnain Zainuddin; Chan Win Oo	21; 10	21; 10
4	(Malaysia) (Myanmar)	Ong Yew Sin / Teo Ee Yi; Arkar Phone Myat / Hein Si Thu Toe	21; 5	21; 5
5	(Malaysia) (Myanmar)	Goh Sze Fei / Nur Izzuddin; Aung Myo Htoo / Chan Win Oo	21; 12	21; 9

==== Chinese Taipei vs Thailand ====
Chinese Taipei
3
Stadium Sultan Abdul Halim, Court 2
7 February 2018, 19:00

Thailand
2

			1	2	3
1	(Chinese Taipei) (Thailand)	Wang Tzu-wei; Khosit Phetpradab	19; 21	17; 21
2	(Chinese Taipei) (Thailand)	Lee Jhe-huei / Lee Yang; Kittinupong Kedren / Dechapol Puavaranukroh	21; 16	21; 7
3	(Chinese Taipei) (Thailand)	Hsu Jen-hao; Kantaphon Wangcharoen	21; 17	21; 16
4	(Chinese Taipei) (Thailand)	Lu Ching-yao / Yang Po-han; Tinn Isriyanet / Kittisak Namdash	21; 15	21; 17
5	(Chinese Taipei) (Thailand)	Lin Yu-hsien; Pannawit Thongnuam	18; 21	19; 21

==== Chinese Taipei vs Malaysia ====
Chinese Taipei
0
Stadium Sultan Abdul Halim, Court 1
8 February 2018, 19:00

Malaysia
5

			1	2	3
1	(Chinese Taipei) (Malaysia)	Wang Tzu-wei; Lee Chong Wei	21; 17	13; 21	15; 21
2	(Chinese Taipei) (Malaysia)	Lee Jhe-huei / Lee Yang; Goh V Shem / Tan Wee Kiong	14; 21	21; 19	16; 21
3	(Chinese Taipei) (Malaysia)	Hsu Jen-hao; Lee Zii Jia	16; 21	13; 21
4	(Chinese Taipei) (Malaysia)	Lu Ching-yao / Yang Po-han; Ong Yew Sin / Teo Ee Yi	14; 21	22; 20	14; 21
5	(Chinese Taipei) (Malaysia)	Lin Yu-hsien; Iskandar Zulkarnain Zainuddin	19; 21	15; 21

==== Thailand vs Myanmar ====
Thailand
5
Stadium Sultan Abdul Halim, Court 2
8 February 2018, 19:00

Myanmar
0

			1	2	3
1	(Thailand) (Myanmar)	Khosit Phetpradab; Phone Pyae Naing	21; 10	21; 10
2	(Thailand) (Myanmar)	Suppanyu Avihingsanon; Aung Myo Htoo	21; 17	21; 14
3	(Thailand) (Myanmar)	Pannawit Thongnuam; Arkar Phone Myat	21; 11	21; 7
4	(Thailand) (Myanmar)	Inkarat Apisuk / Maneepong Jongjit; Aung Myo Htoo / Chan Win Oo	21; 12	21; 14
5	(Thailand) (Myanmar)	Tinn Isriyanet / Kittisak Namdash; Arkar Phone Myat / Hein Si Thu Toe	21; 11	21; 16

=== Group D ===
Pos	Team	Pld	W	L	MF	MA	MD	GF	GA	GD	PF	PA	PD	Pts	Qualification
1	Indonesia	3	3	0	13	2	+11	27	5	+22	658	404	+254	3	Knockout stage
2	India	3	2	1	12	3	+9	25	7	+18	627	421	+206	2	Knockout stage
3	Philippines	3	1	2	5	10	−5	10	20	−10	470	490	−20	1	
4	Maldives	3	0	3	0	15	−15	0	30	−30	190	630	−440	0	

Source: TS

==== India vs Philippines ====
India
5
Stadium Sultan Abdul Halim, Court 3
6 February 2018, 19:00

Philippines
0

			1	2	3
1	(India) (Philippines)	Srikanth Kidambi; Ros Pedrosa	21; 11	21; 12
2	(India) (Philippines)	Manu Attri / B. Sumeeth Reddy; Anton Cayanan / Philip Joper Escueta	21; 15	21; 13
3	(India) (Philippines)	B. Sai Praneeth; Arthur Samuel Salvado	21; 6	21; 10
4	(India) (Philippines)	Arjun M. R. / Ramchandran Shlok; Peter Gabriel Magnaye / Alvin Morada	21; 18	21; 17
5	(India) (Philippines)	Sameer Verma; Lanz Ralf Zafra	21; 15	21; 12

==== Indonesia vs Maldives ====
Indonesia
5
Stadium Sultan Abdul Halim, Court 4
6 February 2018, 19:00

Maldives
0

			1	2	3
1	(Indonesia) (Maldives)	Jonatan Christie; Hussein Zayan Shaheed	21; 3	21; 5
2	(Indonesia) (Maldives)	Anthony Sinisuka Ginting; Ahmed Nibal	21; 10	21; 3
3	(Indonesia) (Maldives)	Ihsan Maulana Mustofa; Hassan Afsheem Shaheem	21; 7	21; 4
4	(Indonesia) (Maldives)	Angga Pratama / Hendra Setiawan; Mohamed Arsalaan Ali / Ahmed Nibal	21; 8	21; 6
5	(Indonesia) (Maldives)	Marcus Fernaldi Gideon / Kevin Sanjaya Sukamuljo; Hussein Zayan Shaheed / Hassan Afsheem Shaheem	21; 10	21; 10

==== Indonesia vs Philippines ====
Indonesia
5
Stadium Sultan Abdul Halim, Court 3
7 February 2018, 19:00

Philippines
0

			1	2	3
1	(Indonesia) (Philippines)	Jonatan Christie; Ros Pedrosa	21; 15	21; 13
2	(Indonesia) (Philippines)	Mohammad Ahsan / Rian Agung Saputro; Anton Cayanan / Philip Joper Escueta	21; 16	21; 11
3	(Indonesia) (Philippines)	Anthony Sinisuka Ginting; Arthur Samuel Salvado	21; 14	21; 9
4	(Indonesia) (Philippines)	Angga Pratama / Hendra Setiawan; Peter Gabriel Magnaye / Alvin Morada	21; 17	21; 16
5	(Indonesia) (Philippines)	Ihsan Maulana Mustofa; Lanz Ralf Zafra	21; 8	21; 12

==== India vs Maldives ====
India
5
Stadium Sultan Abdul Halim, Court 4
7 February 2018, 19:00

Maldives
0

			1	2	3
1	(India) (Maldives)	Srikanth Kidambi; Hussein Zayan Shaheed	21; 5	21; 6
2	(India) (Maldives)	B. Sai Praneeth; Ahmed Nibal	21; 10	21; 4
3	(India) (Maldives)	Sameer Verma; Mohamed Arsalaan Ali	21; 5	21; 1
4	(India) (Maldives)	Satwiksairaj Rankireddy / Chirag Shetty; Hussein Zayan Shaheed / Hassan Afsheem Shaheem	21; 8	21; 8
5	(India) (Maldives)	Arjun M. R. / Ramchandran Shlok; Mohamed Arsalaan Ali / Ahmed Nibal	21; 2	21; 5

==== Indonesia vs India ====
Indonesia
3
Stadium Sultan Abdul Halim, Court 3
8 February 2018, 19:00

India
2

			1	2	3
1	(Indonesia) (India)	Jonatan Christie; Srikanth Kidambi	21; 17	21; 17
2	(Indonesia) (India)	Mohammad Ahsan / Kevin Sanjaya Sukamuljo; Satwiksairaj Rankireddy / Chirag Shetty	21; 18	18; 21	22; 24
3	(Indonesia) (India)	Anthony Sinisuka Ginting; B. Sai Praneeth	18; 21	19; 21
4	(Indonesia) (India)	Angga Pratama / Rian Agung Saputro; Arjun M. R. / Ramchandran Shlok	14; 21	21; 16	21; 12
5	(Indonesia) (India)	Ihsan Maulana Mustofa; B. Sumeeth Reddy	21; 12	21; 7

==== Philippines vs Maldives ====
Philippines
5
Stadium Sultan Abdul Halim, Court 4
8 February 2018, 19:00

Maldives
0

			1	2	3
1	(Philippines) (Maldives)	Ros Pedrosa; Hussein Zayan Shaheed	21; 8	21; 7
2	(Philippines) (Maldives)	Arthur Samuel Salvado; Ahmed Nibal	21; 12	21; 6
3	(Philippines) (Maldives)	Lanz Ralf Zafra; Hassan Afsheem Shaheem	21; 7	21; 4
4	(Philippines) (Maldives)	Peter Gabriel Magnaye / Alvin Morada; Mohamed Arsalaan Ali / Ahmed Nibal	21; 8	21; 9
5	(Philippines) (Maldives)	Anton Cayanan / Philip Joper Escueta; Hussein Zayan Shaheed / Hassan Afsheem Shaheem	21; 3	21; 6

== Knockout stage ==
=== Bracket ===
Quarter-finals
9 February 17:00
China (1)	3
India (5)	1
9 February 17:00
Malaysia (7)	3
Hong Kong	0
9 February 17:00
Thailand	1
South Korea (6)	3
9 February 17:00
Japan (4)	0
Indonesia (2)	3

Semi-finals
10 February 18:00
China (1)	3
Malaysia (7)	1
10 February 18:00
South Korea (6)	2
Indonesia (2)	3

Final
11 February 18:00
China (1)	1
Indonesia (2)	3

=== Quarter-finals ===
==== China vs India ====
China
3
Stadium Sultan Abdul Halim, Court 2
9 February 2018, 17:00

India
1

			1	2	3
1	(China) (India)	Shi Yuqi; Srikanth Kidambi	21; 14	16; 21	7; 21
2	(China) (India)	He Jiting / Tan Qiang; Satwiksairaj Rankireddy / Chirag Shetty	21; 17	21; 18
3	(China) (India)	Qiao Bin; B. Sai Praneeth	9; 21	21; 11	21; 17
4	(China) (India)	Han Chengkai / Zhou Haodong; Manu Attri / B. Sumeeth Reddy	14; 21	21; 19	21; 14
5	(China) (India)	Zhao Junpeng; Sameer Verma				not played

==== Malaysia vs Hong Kong ====
Malaysia
3
Stadium Sultan Abdul Halim, Court 1
9 February 2018, 17:00

Hong Kong
0

			1	2	3
1	(Malaysia) (Hong Kong)	Lee Chong Wei; Ng Ka Long	21; 15	22; 20
2	(Malaysia) (Hong Kong)	Goh V Shem / Tan Wee Kiong; Or Chin Chung / Tang Chun Man	21; 11	21; 16
3	(Malaysia) (Hong Kong)	Lee Zii Jia; Wong Wing Ki	21; 16	21; 15
4	(Malaysia) (Hong Kong)	Ong Yew Sin / Teo Ee Yi; Lee Chun Hei / Yeung Ming Nok				not played
5	(Malaysia) (Hong Kong)	Iskandar Zulkarnain Zainuddin; Lee Cheuk Yiu				not played

==== Thailand vs South Korea ====
Thailand
1
Stadium Sultan Abdul Halim, Court 3
9 February 2018, 17:00

South Korea
3

			1	2	3
1	(Thailand) (South Korea)	Khosit Phetpradab; Son Wan-ho	15; 21	12; 21
2	(Thailand) (South Korea)	Kittinupong Kedren / Dechapol Puavaranukroh; Kim Won-ho / Seo Seung-jae	21; 16	15; 21	21; 16
3	(Thailand) (South Korea)	Suppanyu Avihingsanon; Jeon Hyeok-jin	15; 21	14; 21
4	(Thailand) (South Korea)	Tinn Isriyanet / Kittisak Namdash; Choi Sol-gyu / Kim Duk-young	21; 12	13; 21	21; 23
5	(Thailand) (South Korea)	Kantaphon Wangcharoen; Lee Dong-keun				not played

==== Japan vs Indonesia ====
Japan
0
Stadium Sultan Abdul Halim, Court 4
9 February 2018, 17:00

Indonesia
3

			1	2	3
1	(Japan) (Indonesia)	Kenta Nishimoto; Jonatan Christie	11; 21	22; 20	13; 21
2	(Japan) (Indonesia)	Takeshi Kamura / Keigo Sonoda; Mohammad Ahsan / Kevin Sanjaya Sukamuljo	17; 21	15; 21
3	(Japan) (Indonesia)	Kazumasa Sakai; Anthony Sinisuka Ginting	23; 21	14; 21	17; 21
4	(Japan) (Indonesia)	Hiroyuki Endo / Yuta Watanabe; Rian Agung Saputro / Hendra Setiawan				not played
5	(Japan) (Indonesia)	Kento Momota; Ihsan Maulana Mustofa				not played

=== Semi-finals ===
==== China vs Malaysia ====
China
3
Stadium Sultan Abdul Halim, Court 1
10 February 2018, 18:00

Malaysia
1

			1	2	3
1	(China) (Malaysia)	Shi Yuqi; Lee Zii Jia	21; 18	21; 9
2	(China) (Malaysia)	He Jiting / Tan Qiang; Goh V Shem / Tan Wee Kiong	18; 21	12; 21
3	(China) (Malaysia)	Qiao Bin; Soong Joo Ven	21; 17	21; 8
4	(China) (Malaysia)	Han Chengkai / Zhou Haodong; Ong Yew Sin / Teo Ee Yi	21; 15	21; 13
5	(China) (Malaysia)	Zhao Junpeng; Iskandar Zulkarnain Zainuddin				not played

==== South Korea vs Indonesia ====
South Korea
2
Stadium Sultan Abdul Halim, Court 2
10 February 2018, 18:00

Indonesia
3

			1	2	3
1	(South Korea) (Indonesia)	Son Wan-ho; Jonatan Christie	18; 21	14; 21
2	(South Korea) (Indonesia)	Chung Eui-seok / Seo Seung-jae; Mohammad Ahsan / Angga Pratama	8; 21	10; 21
3	(South Korea) (Indonesia)	Jeon Hyeok-jin; Ihsan Maulana Mustofa	21; 17	21; 16
4	(South Korea) (Indonesia)	Choi Sol-gyu / Kim Duk-young; Rian Agung Saputro / Hendra Setiawan	11; 21	21; 18	21; 19
5	(South Korea) (Indonesia)	Lee Dong-keun; Firman Abdul Kholik	20; 22	21; 11	20; 22

=== Final ===
==== China vs Indonesia ====
China
1
Stadium Sultan Abdul Halim, Court 1
11 February 2018, 18:00

Indonesia
3

			1	2	3
1	(China) (Indonesia)	Shi Yuqi; Jonatan Christie	21; 16	17; 21	18; 21
2	(China) (Indonesia)	He Jiting / Tan Qiang; Mohammad Ahsan / Angga Pratama	19; 21	18; 21
3	(China) (Indonesia)	Qiao Bin; Anthony Sinisuka Ginting	21; 12	11; 21	21; 14
4	(China) (Indonesia)	Han Chengkai / Zhou Haodong; Rian Agung Saputro / Hendra Setiawan	14; 21	19; 21
5	(China) (Indonesia)	Zhao Junpeng; Firman Abdul Kholik				not played

== Final ranking ==
Pos	Team	Pld	W	L	Pts	MD	GD	PD	Final result
1st place, gold medalist(s)	Indonesia	6	6	0	6	+17	+32	+323	Champions
2nd place, silver medalist(s)	China	5	4	1	4	+12	+21	+158	Runners-up
3rd place, bronze medalist(s)	South Korea	5	4	1	4	+12	+24	+288	Eliminated in semi-finals
3rd place, bronze medalist(s)	Malaysia	5	3	2	3	+10	+18	+191	Eliminated in semi-finals
5	India	4	2	2	2	+7	+15	+207	Eliminated in quarter-finals
6	Japan	3	2	2	2	+6	+14	+197	Eliminated in quarter-finals
7	Thailand	3	2	2	2	+3	+5	+28	Eliminated in quarter-finals
8	Hong Kong	3	1	2	1	−3	−4	−40	Eliminated in quarter-finals
9	Chinese Taipei	3	2	1	2	+1	+5	+46	Eliminated in group stage
10	Philippines	3	1	2	1	−5	−10	−20	Eliminated in group stage
11	Kazakhstan	3	1	2	1	−5	−10	−165	Eliminated in group stage
12	Singapore	2	0	2	0	−10	−20	−129	Eliminated in group stage
13	Myanmar	3	0	3	0	−15	−30	−290	Eliminated in group stage
14	Nepal	2	0	2	0	−15	−30	−354	Eliminated in group stage
15	Maldives	2	0	2	0	−15	−30	−440	Eliminated in group stage
