= 2016–17 Algerian Basketball Cup =

2017 Coupe d'Algérie
Tournament details
- Arena: Hacène Harcha Arena; Algiers
- Dates: 6 July 2017

Final positions
- Champions: GS Pétroliers
- Runners-up: US Sétif

Awards and statistics

The 2016–17 Algerian Basketball Cup is the 48th edition of the Algerian Basketball Cup. It is managed by the FABB and is held in Algiers, in the Hacène Harcha Arena on July 5, 2017.

== Bracket ==
Quarterfinals; 6–16 May
PS El-Eulma	43
CRB Dar Beida	65
NB Staoueli	83
AB Skikda	48
USM Blida	49
GS Pétrolier	97
US Sétif	67
NA Hussein Dey	62

Semifinals; 17–18 June
CRB Dar Beida	62
US Setif	64
GS petrolier	75
NB Staouéli	56

Final; 5 July
US Setif	52
GS petrolier	62

== Quarterfinals ==
6 May 2017	PS El-Eulma	43–65	CRB Dar Beida	?
00:00 (CET)	Scoring by quarter: –, –, –, –
				Arena: ? Attendance: , Referees: , ,

6 May 2017	NB Staoueli	83–48	AB Skikda	?
00:00 (CET)	Scoring by quarter: –, –, –, –
				Arena: ? Attendance: , Referees: , ,

6 May 2017	USM Blida	49–97	GS Pétrolier	?
00:00 (CET)	Scoring by quarter: –, –, –, –
				Arena: ? Attendance: , Referees: , ,

16 May 2017	US Sétif	67–62	NA Hussein Dey	Bordj bou arreridj
00:00 (CET)	Scoring by quarter: –, –, –, –
				Arena: ? Attendance: , Referees: , ,

== Semifinals ==
17 June 2017	CRB Dar Beida	62–64	US Setif	Zemmouri
22:30 (CET)	Scoring by quarter: –, –, –, –
				Arena: Salle Si Mustapha; Attendance: , Referees: , ,

18 June 2017	GS petrolier	75–56	NB Staouéli	Zemmouri
22:30 (CET)	Scoring by quarter: –, –, –, –
				Arena: Salle Si Mustapha; Attendance: , Referees: , ,

== Final ==
6 July 2017	GS Pétroliers	62–52	US Sétif	Cheraga
18:12 (CET)	Scoring by quarter: –, –, –, –
				Arena: Salle Tahar Belakhder; Attendance: , Referees: , ,
