= MC Oran (basketball) =

- Leagues: Algerian Basketball Championship
- Founded: 1 January 1917
- Dissolved: 1994
- Arena: Palais des Sports Hamou Boutlélis
- Location: Oran, Algeria
- Team colors: White, Red
- Championships: 1 Algerian Championship; 1 Algerian Cup
Home	Away

Mouloudia Club d'Oran (basketball) (Arabic: نادي مولودية وهران لكرة السلة), referred to as MC Oran BK for a short, is a basketball club based in Oran, Algeria that played in the Algerian Basketball Championship. The team was dissolved in 1994.

== Honours ==
- Algerian Basketball Championship

Champion (1): 1983–84

- Algerian Basketball Cup

Winner (1): 1989–90
Runner-up (1): 1990–91

== Notable players ==
- (Algeria) Abdelkader Soudani
