= George Williams (basketball, born 1990) =

American basketball player (born 1990)

US Monastir
- Position: Guard

Personal information
- Born: April 16, 1990 (age 36) Houston, Texas, U.S.
- Listed height: 6 ft 6 in (1.98 m)
- Listed weight: 220 lb (100 kg)

Career information
- High school: Brookville (Lynchburg, Virginia); Second Baptist (Houston, Texas)
- College: State Fair CC (2008–2010); Wayland Baptist (2010–2012)
- NBA draft: 2012: undrafted
- Playing career: 2012–present

Career history
- 2012–2013: Cleveland Havok
- 2013: Lone Star Strikers
- 2013–2014: Lynchburg Titans
- 2013–2014: Mississauga Power
- 2014–2015: San Pedro Tiger Sharks
- 2017: San Pedro Tiger Sharks
- 2017–2018: Libertadores de Querétaro
- 2018: Amistad Sucre
- 2018: Pioneros de Los Mochis
- 2018–2019: Libertadores de Querétaro
- 2018–2019: Cape Breton Highlanders
- 2019: Entretanto Meta La Salle Tarija
- 2019–2020: Club Deportes Puerto Varas
- 2019–2020: Ferro Carril Oeste
- 2021: Reales de La Vega
- 2021: Al Bashaer
- 2021–2022: Al-Arabi
- 2022: Marinos
- 2022: Reales de La Vega
- 2022: Al Bashaer
- 2022: Kenya Ports Authority
- 2022–2023: Nalaikh Bison
- 2023: Marinos
- 2023: USM Alger
- 2023: Sagesse SC
- 2024: Nalaikh Bison
- 2024–present: US Monastir

George Attitebi Williams II (born April 16, 1990) is an American professional basketball player for US Monastir.

== Professional career ==
On September 9, 2023, Williams joined USM Alger and strengthened their roster to participate in the Arab Club Basketball Championship. On October 19, 2023, Williams joined the Lebanese club Sagesse SC and was about to join the Egyptian Club Telecom.

== ACBC career statistics ==
Legend
GP	Games played	GS	Games started	MPG	Minutes per game
FG%	Field goal percentage	3P%	3-point field goal percentage	FT%	Free throw percentage
RPG	Rebounds per game	APG	Assists per game	SPG	Steals per game
BPG	Blocks per game	PPG	Points per game	**Bold**	Career high

Year	Team	GP	GS	MPG	FG%	3P%	FT%	RPG	APG	SPG	BPG	PPG
2023	USM Alger	6	6	36:3	0	0	0	0	0	0	0	20.5
Career		6	6	36:3	0	0	0	0	0	0	0	20.5
