= Hacène Harcha Arena =

Sports venue

Coordinates: 36.7762°N 3.0600°E

Harcha Hassan Arena
- Interactive map of Harcha Hassan Arena
- Full name: Salle Omnisports Harcha Hassan
- Location: Algiers, Algeria
- Capacity: 8,000

Construction
- Opened: 1975

Tenant
- GS Pétroliers

Harcha Hassan Arena is an indoor sporting arena located in Algiers, Algeria. The capacity of the arena is 8,000 spectators. It hosts indoor sporting events such as Handball, Basketball, Volleyball and hosts the home matches of MC Alger. It also hosted many international competitions.

== Competitions hosted ==
Some of major senior competitions are below

- Pan Arab Games
  - 1 time (2004)
- Mediterranean Games
  - 1 time (1975)
- All-Africa Games
  - 2 times (1978 & 2007)
- African Handball Championship
  - 4 times (Men's & Women's 1976, Men's & Women's 1989, Men's & Women's 2000 & Men's & Women's 2014)
- FIBA Africa Championship
  - 2 times (Men's 1995 & Men's 2005)
- African Volleyball Championship
  - 1 time (Men's 1993)
- Vovinam World Championships
  - 1 time Vovinam World Championship 2015
