= Croatia men's national basketball team =

Men's national basketball team representing Croatia

Croatia
- FIBA ranking: 32 ▲2 (1 September 2026)
- Joined FIBA: 1992
- FIBA zone: FIBA Europe
- National federation: HKS
- Coach: Tomislav Mijatović
- Nickname(s): Kockasti (The Chequered Ones)

Olympic Games
- Appearances: 4
- Medals: (silver) Silver: (1992)

FIBA World Cup
- Appearances: 3
- Medals: (bronze) Bronze: (1994)

EuroBasket
- Appearances: 14
- Medals: (bronze) Bronze: (1993, 1995)
| Home | Away |

First international
- Germany 86–74 Croatia (Murcia, Spain; 22 June 1992)

Biggest win
- Croatia 124–51 Iceland (Murcia, Spain; 24 June 1992); Cyprus 50–123 Croatia (Limassol, Cyprus; 3 July 2026)

Biggest defeat
- Croatia 70–103 United States (Barcelona, Spain; 27 July 1992)
Medal record
Olympic Games
| Silver medal – second place | 1992 Barcelona | Team |
FIBA World Cup
| Bronze medal – third place | 1994 Canada |
EuroBasket
| Bronze medal – third place | 1993 Germany |
| Bronze medal – third place | 1995 Greece |
Mediterranean Games
| Gold medal – first place | 2009 Pescara | Team |
| Silver medal – second place | 1993 Languedoc-Roussillon | Team |

The Croatia men's national basketball team (Croatian: Hrvatska košarkaška reprezentacija) represents Croatia in international basketball matches. The team is controlled by the Croatian Basketball Federation (HKS).

The biggest success Croatia has achieved was at the 1992 Barcelona Olympics when the team reached the final against the United States and won the silver medal. Croatia has also won one bronze medal at the FIBA World Cup and two bronze medals at EuroBasket.

Croatia's Krešimir Ćosić, Dražen Petrović, Dino Rađa, Mirko Novosel and Toni Kukoč are members of the Naismith Memorial Basketball Hall of Fame. Ćosić was inducted in 1996, Petrović in 2002, Rađa in 2018 and Kukoč in 2021, all as players. Novosel was inducted in 2007 as a coach. Petrović, Ćosić, Kukoč and Novosel are members of the FIBA Hall of Fame. Ćosić is also the only Croatian to have received the FIBA Order of Merit. Ćosić, however, never played for the Croatia national team. As he was only a member of the Yugoslavia national team, holding the record for number of medals (including Olympic gold) and the most games played by a player.

== History ==
=== Prior to Croatian independence ===
Croatia played its first unofficial friendly game on 2 June 1964 in Karlovac. Croatian team played against US All Star Team and lost 65–110 (31–50). USA players coached by Red Auerbach were Bob Cousy, Tom Heinsohn, K. C. Jones, Jerry Lucas, Bob Pettit, Oscar Robertson and Bill Russell and Croatian team was Giuseppe Gjergja, Nemanja Đurić, Živko Kasun, Zlatko Kiseljak, Slobodan Kolaković, Dragan Kovačić, Boris Križan, Stjepan Ledić, Mirko Novosel, Marko Ostarčević, Petar Skansi and Željko Troskot.

=== Independent Croatia ===
After independence of Croatia in 1991, the first official tournament played by Croatians were the 1992 Summer Olympics in Barcelona. Croatia defeated the CIS team 75–74 and reached the final against the USA Dream Team led by Michael Jordan. The USA won 85–117, but Croatia won its first medal at a major tournament in history.

The next competition for Croatia was the 1993 EuroBasket in Germany. Tragically, before the tournament Dražen Petrović died in a car accident on 7 June 1993 at the age of 28. Croatia still managed to reach the bronze medal game to defeat Greece 99–59.

Croatia earned its third medal at the 1994 FIBA World Cup in Canada. Croatia lost their semi-finals match against Russia 64–66, but beat Greece once again 78–60 for the bronze medal. A similar occurrence happened at the EuroBasket 1995 in Greece. Croatia lost in the semi-finals 80–90 against Lithuania, but beat Greece 73–68 for the third time in a row in a bronze medal match. That medal to date was the last Croatian medal from any major tournament. At the 1996 Summer Olympics Croatia finished in a subpar seventh place.

=== Decline ===
At the EuroBasket 1997 in Spain, the new Croatian generation emerged, but ended in 11th place. Croatia failed to qualify for the 2000, 2004, 2012, 2020, 2024 Summer Olympics, but finished sixth at the 2008 and fifth at the 2016. Croatia also failed to qualify for the 1998, 2002, 2006, 2019 and 2023 FIBA Basketball World Cups. They also failed to qualify for their first ever Eurobasket in 2025. Although the team did manage to qualify in 2010, before falling in the Round of 16. However, at the EuroBasket 2013, Croatia had its best tournament appearance since 1995, where the team finished in fourth place.

== Honours ==
The Croatia national team's all-time medal table:

| Games | Gold | Silver | Bronze | Total |
| Summer Olympics | 0 | 1 | 0 | 1 |
| FIBA World Cup | 0 | 0 | 1 | 1 |
| EuroBasket | 0 | 0 | 2 | 2 |
| Mediterranean Games | 1 | 1 | 0 | 2 |
| Stanković Cup | 2 | 1 | 0 | 3 |
| Total | 3 | 3 | 3 | 9 |

== Competitive record ==
=== FIBA World Cup ===
| World Cup | | | | | Qualification | | |
| Year | Position | Pld | W | L | Pld | W | L |
|---|---|---|---|---|---|---|---|
| 1950 to 1990 | Part of Yugoslavia | | | | Part of Yugoslavia | | |
| (Canada) 1994 | 3rd place, bronze medalist(s) | 8 | 7 | 1 | EuroBasket served as qualifiers | | |
| (Greece) 1998 | Did not qualify | | | | EuroBasket served as qualifiers | | |
| (United States) 2002 | Did not qualify | | | | EuroBasket served as qualifiers | | |
| (Japan) 2006 | Did not qualify | | | | EuroBasket served as qualifiers | | |
| (Turkey) 2010 | 14th | 6 | 2 | 4 | EuroBasket served as qualifiers | | |
| (Spain) 2014 | 10th | 6 | 3 | 3 | EuroBasket served as qualifiers | | |
| (China) 2019 | Did not qualify | | | | 12 | 4 | 8 |
| (Philippines) (Japan) (Indonesia) 2023 | Did not qualify | | | | 6 | 1 | 5 |
| (Qatar) 2027 | To be determined | | | | To be determined | | |
| (France) 2031 | To be determined | | | | To be determined | | |
| Total | 3/8 | 20 | 12 | 8 | 18 | 5 | 13 |

=== Olympic Games ===
| Olympic Games | | | | | Qualifying | | |
| Year | Position | Pld | W | L | Pld | W | L |
|---|---|---|---|---|---|---|---|
| 1936 to 1988 | Part of Yugoslavia | | | | Part of Yugoslavia | | |
| (Spain) 1992 | 2nd place, silver medalist(s) | 8 | 6 | 2 | 11 | 10 | 1 |
| (United States) 1996 | 7th | 8 | 4 | 4 | Direct qualification | | |
| (Australia) 2000 | Did not qualify | | | | Did not qualify | | |
| (Greece) 2004 | Did not qualify | | | | Did not qualify | | |
| (China) 2008 | 6th | 6 | 3 | 3 | 4 | 4 | 0 |
| (United Kingdom) 2012 | Did not qualify | | | | Did not qualify | | |
| (Brazil) 2016 | 5th | 6 | 3 | 3 | 4 | 3 | 1 |
| (Japan) 2020 | Did not qualify | | | | 3 | 1 | 2 |
| (France) 2024 | Did not qualify | | | | 9 | 7 | 2 |
| (United States) 2028 | To be determined | | | | To be determined | | |
| Total | 4/9 | 28 | 16 | 12 | 31 | 25 | 6 |

=== EuroBasket ===
| EuroBasket | | | | | Qualification | | |
| Year | Position | Pld | W | L | Pld | W | L |
|---|---|---|---|---|---|---|---|
| 1935 to 1991 | Part of Yugoslavia | | | | Part of Yugoslavia | | |
| (Germany) 1993 | 3rd place, bronze medalist(s) | 9 | 8 | 1 | 7 | 6 | 1 |
| (Greece) 1995 | 3rd place, bronze medalist(s) | 9 | 8 | 1 | 6 | 5 | 1 |
| (Spain) 1997 | 11th | 8 | 2 | 6 | 10 | 7 | 3 |
| (France) 1999 | 11th | 6 | 3 | 3 | 10 | 7 | 3 |
| (Turkey) 2001 | 7th | 7 | 3 | 4 | 10 | 10 | 0 |
| (Sweden) 2003 | 11th | 4 | 1 | 3 | 10 | 8 | 2 |
| (Serbia and Montenegro) 2005 | 7th | 7 | 4 | 3 | 4 | 3 | 1 |
| (Spain) 2007 | 6th | 9 | 3 | 6 | 6 | 5 | 1 |
| (Poland) 2009 | 6th | 9 | 4 | 5 | Direct qualification | | |
| (Lithuania) 2011 | 13th | 5 | 2 | 3 | Direct qualification | | |
| (Slovenia) 2013 | 4th | 11 | 8 | 3 | 8 | 8 | 0 |
| (France) (Croatia) (Germany) (Latvia) 2015 | 9th | 6 | 3 | 3 | Qualified as co-host | | |
| (Finland) (Israel) (Romania) (Turkey) 2017 | 10th | 6 | 4 | 2 | Direct qualification | | |
| (Czech Republic) (Georgia (country)) (Italy) (Germany) 2022 | 12th | 6 | 3 | 3 | 6 | 4 | 2 |
| (Cyprus) (Finland) (Poland) (Latvia) 2025 | Did not qualify | | | | 16 | 12 | 4 |
| (Estonia) (Greece) (Slovenia) (Spain) 2029 | To be determined | | | | To be determined | | |
| Total | 14/15 | 102 | 56 | 46 | 93 | 75 | 18 |

== Results and fixtures ==
Win Loss

=== 2025 ===
| 6 August 2025 2027 FIBA World Cup pre-qualifiers – 2nd round | Norway | 68–101 | Croatia | Bergen, Norway |
| 18:00 (UTC+2) | Scoring by quarter: 21–20, 18–31, 12–27, 17–23 |
| | Pts: Savić 13; Rebs: Savić 7 Asts: Espe, Frey 6 | Boxscore | Pts: Hezonja 27; Rebs: Hezonja, Šarić 8 Asts: Šarić 5 | Arena: Åsane Arena; Attendance: 1,075; Referees: Yener Yilmaz (TUR), Ventsislav Velikov (BUL), Geert Jacobs (BEL) |

| 9 August 2025 2027 FIBA World Cup pre-qualifiers – 2nd round | Croatia | 100–71 | Denmark | Opatija, Croatia |
| 20:30 (UTC+2) | Scoring by quarter: 24–14, 32–29, 21–16, 23–12 |
| | Pts: Smith 24; Rebs: Drežnjak 5 Asts: Smith 6 | Boxscore | Pts: Dibba 17; Rebs: Berg 5 Asts: three players 3 | Arena: Marino Cvetković Sports Hall; Attendance: 500; Referees: Kerem Baki (TUR), Michał Proc (POL), Zdenko Tomašovič (SVK) |

| 16 August 2025 2027 FIBA World Cup pre-qualifiers – 2nd round | Croatia | 102–53 | Norway | Opatija, Croatia |
| 20:30 (UTC+2) | Scoring by quarter: 28–14, 34–8, 22–13, 18–18 |
| | Pts: Hezonja 21; Rebs: Ružić, Šarić 6 Asts: Šarić 8 | Boxscore | Pts: Nordheim, Savić 11; Rebs: Savić 10; Asts: four players 2 | Arena: Marino Cvetković Sports Hall; Attendance: 450; Referees: Martin Horozov (BUL), Andris Aunkrogers (LAT), Zafer Yılmaz (TUR) |

| 20 August 2025 2027 FIBA World Cup pre-qualifiers – 2nd round | Denmark | 76–79 | Croatia | Farum, Denmark |
| 19:00 (UTC+2) | Scoring by quarter: 21–12, 17–24, 19–24, 19–19 |
| | Pts: Dibba 19; Rebs: Webb 11; Asts: Heede-Andersen 8 | Boxscore | Pts: Šarić 30; Rebs: Šarić 8 Asts: Badžim 5 | Arena: Farum Arena; Attendance: 1,763; Referees: Wojciech Liszka (POL), Lorenzo Baldini (ITA), Mihkel Männiste (EST) |

| 28 November 2025 2027 FIBA World Cup qualifiers – 1st round | Croatia | 100–60 | Cyprus | Osijek, Croatia |
| 19:00 (UTC+1) | Scoring by quarter: 28–8, 19–19, 28–23, 25–10 |
| | Pts: Hezonja 25; Rebs: Prkačin 8 Asts: Mavra 7 | Boxscore | Pts: Tigkas 14; Rebs: Jung 9 Asts: Michail 6 | Arena: Gradski vrt Hall; Attendance: 2,000; Referees: Péter Praksch (HUN), Alberto Sánchez (ESP), Ivor Matějek (CZE) |

| 1 December 2025 2027 FIBA World Cup qualifiers – 1st round | Israel | 71–85 | Croatia | Riga, Latvia |
| 21:00 (UTC+2) | Scoring by quarter: 25–25, 17–22, 14–24, 15–14 |
| | Pts: Sorkin 20; Rebs: Zoosman 6 Asts: Huber 6 | Boxscore | Pts: Ružić 23; Rebs: Hezonja 13; Asts: Smith 6 | Arena: Arena Riga; Attendance: 45; Referees: Gvidas Gedvilas (LTU), Michał Proć (POL), Tolga Edis (TUR) |

=== 2026 ===
| 27 February 2026 2027 FIBA World Cup qualifiers – 1st round | Croatia | 93–88 | Germany | Zagreb, Croatia |
| 20:00 (UTC+1) | Scoring by quarter: 20–26, 26–24, 29–22, 18–16 |
| | Pts: Šarić 23; Rebs: Šarić 7 Asts: Mavra, Smith 6 | Boxscore | Pts: Krämer 22; Rebs: Schneider 9 Asts: Kayil 5 | Arena: Dražen Petrović Basketball Hall; Attendance: 4,700; Referees: Wojciech Liszka (POL), Gatis Saliņš (LAT), Ritvars Helmšteins (LAT) |

| 1 March 2026 2027 FIBA World Cup qualifiers – 1st round | Germany | 91–89(OT) | Croatia | Bonn, Germany |
| 18:00 (UTC+1) | Scoring by quarter: 22–24, 19–26, 21–17, 15–10, Overtime: 14–12 |
| | Pts: Thiemann 24; Rebs: Thiemann 12; Asts: Kayil 6 | Boxscore | Pts: Hezonja 30; Rebs: Smith 9 Asts: Smith 9 | Arena: Telekom Dome; Attendance: 6,032; Referees: Yohan Rosso (FRA), Andris Aunkrogers (LAT), Zdenko Tomašovič (SVK) |

| 3 July 2026 2027 FIBA World Cup qualifiers – 1st round | Cyprus | 50–123 | Croatia | Limassol, Cyprus |
| 20:00 (UTC+3) | Scoring by quarter: 12–35, 14–24, 10–33, 14–31 |
| | Pts: S. Tigkas 10; Rebs: Mantovani, Pasiali 4 Asts: five players 2 | Boxscore | Pts: Zubac 24; Rebs: Zubac 11; Asts: Hezonja 12 | Arena: Spyros Kyprianou Athletic Center; Attendance: 1,000; Referees: Lorenzo Baldini (ITA), Ivor Matějek (CZE), Rainis Värv (EST) |

| 6 July 2026 2027 FIBA World Cup qualifiers – 1st round | Croatia | 103–75 | Israel | Osijek, Croatia |
| 20:00 (UTC+2) | Scoring by quarter: 25–12, 22–19, 27–20, 29–24 |
| | Pts: Zubac 18; Rebs: Šarić 13; Asts: Šarić 7 | Boxscore | Pts: Madar 21; Rebs: Palatin 6 Asts: Madar, Palatin 5 | Arena: Gradski vrt Hall; Attendance: 2,788; Referees: Martin Horozov (BUL), Geert Jacobs (BEL), Juozas Barkauskas (LTU) |

| 27 August 2026 2027 FIBA World Cup qualifiers – 2nd round | Croatia | 115–80 | Latvia | Zadar, Croatia |
| 20:00 (UTC+2) | Scoring by quarter: 23–14, 37–27, 25–16, 30–23 |
| | Pts: Hezonja 28; Rebs: Šarić 9 Asts: Hezonja 7 | Boxscore | Pts: Lomažs 23; Rebs: five players 3 Asts: Strautiņš 3 | Arena: Krešimir Ćosić Hall; Attendance: 7,306; Referees: Ariadna Chueca (ESP), Georgios Poursanidis (GRE), Ioannis Agrafiotis (GRE) |

| 30 August 2026 2027 FIBA World Cup qualifiers – 2nd round | Netherlands | 99–101 | Croatia | Almere, Netherlands |
| 14:30 (UTC+2) | Scoring by quarter: 31–22, 27–22, 19–32, 22–25 |
| | Pts: Van der Vuurst 23; Rebs: Franke, Mast 6 Asts: Van der Vuurst 5 | Boxscore | Pts: Šarić, Zubac 24; Rebs: Zubac 11; Asts: Šarić, Smith 6 | Arena: Topsportcentrum; Attendance: 3,108; Referees: Paulo Marques (POR), Fernando Calatrava (ESP), Tolga Edis (TUR) |

| 27 November 2026 2027 FIBA World Cup qualifiers – 2nd round | Poland | vs. | Croatia | Gliwice, Poland |
| 20:45 (UTC+1) |
| | | Boxscore | | Arena: Gliwice Arena |

| 30 November 2026 2027 FIBA World Cup qualifiers – 2nd round | Croatia | vs. | Netherlands | Zagreb, Croatia |
| 20:00 (UTC+1) |
| | | Boxscore | | Arena: Dražen Petrović Basketball Hall |

=== 2027 ===
| 25 February 2027 2027 FIBA World Cup qualifiers – 2nd round | Latvia | vs. | Croatia | Latvia |
| --:-- (UTC+2) |
| | | Boxscore |

| 28 February 2027 2027 FIBA World Cup qualifiers – 2nd round | Croatia | vs. | Poland | Croatia |
| --:-- (UTC+1) |
| | | Boxscore |

== Team ==
=== Current roster ===
Roster for the 2027 FIBA World Cup Qualifiers matches on 27 and 30 August 2026 against Latvia and Netherlands.

Croatia men's national basketball team roster
Players
Coaches

| Pos. | No. | Name | Age – Date of birth | Height | Club | Ctr. |
|---|---|---|---|---|---|---|
| G | 3 | Jaleen Smith | 31 – 24 November 1994 | 1.93 m (6 ft 4 in) | Hapoel Jerusalem | (Israel) |
| SG | 5 | Antonio Jordano | 27 – 25 February 1999 | 1.90 m (6 ft 3 in) | SC Derby | (Montenegro) |
| G/F | 8 | Mario Hezonja (C) | 31 – 25 February 1995 | 2.00 m (6 ft 7 in) | Cleveland Cavaliers | (United States) |
| F/C | 9 | Dario Šarić (C) | 32 – 8 April 1994 | 2.08 m (6 ft 10 in) | Anadolu Efes | (Turkey) |
| F/C | 17 | Karlo Matković | 25 – 30 March 2001 | 2.06 m (6 ft 9 in) | New Orleans Pelicans | (United States) |
| SG | 18 | Roko Badžim | 29 – 18 August 1997 | 1.97 m (6 ft 6 in) | Cibona | (Croatia) |
| PG | 19 | Dominik Mavra | 32 – 15 June 1994 | 1.88 m (6 ft 2 in) | Breogán | (Spain) |
| C | 22 | Danko Branković | 25 – 5 November 2000 | 2.14 m (7 ft 0 in) | Breogán | (Spain) |
| SG | 23 | Mateo Drežnjak | 27 – 8 March 1999 | 1.96 m (6 ft 5 in) | Budućnost | (Montenegro) |
| F | 24 | David Škara | 31 – 26 February 1995 | 2.00 m (6 ft 7 in) | Cedevita Olimpija | (Slovenia) |
| SF | 29 | Luka Božić | 30 – 29 April 1996 | 2.00 m (6 ft 7 in) | Free agent |
| C | 40 | Ivica Zubac | 29 – 18 April 1997 | 2.16 m (7 ft 1 in) | Indiana Pacers | (United States) |
| PF | 99 | Toni Nakić | 27 – 1 June 1999 | 2.00 m (6 ft 7 in) | Murcia | (Spain) |

Head coach

- (Croatia) Tomislav Mijatović

Assistant coach(es)

- (Croatia) Dražen Orešković
- (Croatia) Iván Tomás

Legend

- (C) Team captain
- Club – describes last
  club before the competition
- Age – describes age
  on 27 August 2026

=== Depth chart ===
| Pos. | Starting 5 | Bench 1 | Bench 2 | Bench 3 |
|---|---|---|---|---|
| C | Ivica Zubac | Karlo Matković | Danko Branković | Ante Žižić |
| PF | Dario Šarić | Michael Ružić | David Škara | Luka Šamanić |
| SF | Luka Božić | Toni Nakić | Mateo Drežnjak |
| SG | Mario Hezonja | Roko Badžim | Antonio Jordano |
| PG | Jaleen Smith | Dominik Mavra | Krešimir Radovčić | Lovro Gnjidić |

== Head coaches ==
1990s and 2000s

| Years | Name | Competition |
|---|---|---|
| 1992 | Petar Skansi | (silver) 1992 Summer Olympics |
| 1993 | Mirko Novosel | (bronze) 1993 EuroBasket |
| 1994 | Josip Gjergja | (bronze) 1994 World Cup |
| 1995 | Aleksandar Petrović | (bronze) 1995 EuroBasket |
| 1996–1998 | Petar Skansi | 7th 1996 Summer Olympics; 11th 1997 EuroBasket |
| 1999 | Boško Božić | 9th 1999 EuroBasket |
| 1999–2001 | Aleksandar Petrović | 7th 2001 EuroBasket |
| 2001–2005 | Neven Spahija | 11th 2003 EuroBasket; 7th 2005 EuroBasket |
| 2005–2009 | Jasmin Repeša | 6th 2007 EuroBasket; 6th 2008 Summer Olympics; 6th 2009 EuroBasket |

2010s and 2020s

| Years | Name | Competition |
|---|---|---|
| 2010–2011 | Josip-Jerko Vranković | 14th 2010 World Cup; 13th 2011 EuroBasket |
| 2012–2014 | Jasmin Repeša | 4th 2013 EuroBasket; 10th 2014 World Cup |
| 2015 | Velimir Perasović | 9th 2015 EuroBasket |
| 2016–2017 | Aleksandar Petrović | 5th 2016 Summer Olympics; 10th 2017 EuroBasket |
| 2017–2018 | Ivica Skelin | — |
| 2018–2019 | Dražen Anzulović | — |
| 2019–2022 | Veljko Mršić | — |
| 2022 | Damir Mulaomerović | 12th 2022 EuroBasket |
| 2022–2023 | Aleksandar Petrović (interim) | — |
| 2023–2025 | Josip Sesar | — |
| 2025–present | Tomislav Mijatović | |

== Past rosters ==
- EuroBasket 1993
- EuroBasket 1995
- EuroBasket 1997
- EuroBasket 1999
- EuroBasket 2001
- EuroBasket 2003
- EuroBasket 2005
- EuroBasket 2007
- EuroBasket 2009
- EuroBasket 2011
- EuroBasket 2013
- EuroBasket 2015
- EuroBasket 2017
- EuroBasket 2022
- 1994 FIBA World Cup
- 2010 FIBA World Cup
- 2014 FIBA World Cup
- 1992 Summer Olympics
- 1996 Summer Olympics
- 2008 Summer Olympics
- 2016 Summer Olympics

== Notable players and coaches ==
Players

=== Individual awards ===
- FIBA World Cup MVP
  - Dražen Petrović – 1986
  - Toni Kukoč – 1990
- EuroBasket MVP
  - Krešimir Ćosić – 1971, 1975
  - Dražen Petrović – 1989
  - Toni Kukoč – 1991
- Olympics Top Scorer
  - Bojan Bogdanović – 2016
- EuroBasket Top Scorer - by total points
  - Dražen Petrović – 1985
- FIBA World Cup All-Tournament Team
  - Krešimir Ćosić – 1970, 1978
  - Vinko Jelovac – 1974
  - Dražen Petrović – 1986
  - Toni Kukoč – 1990
  - Dino Rađa – 1994
- EuroBasket All-Tournament Team
  - Krešimir Ćosić – 1969, 1971, 1973, 1975, 1979
  - Dražen Petrović – 1985, 1989
  - Dino Rađa – 1989, 1993
  - Toni Kukoč – 1991, 1995
  - Damir Mulaomerović – 2001
  - Bojan Bogdanović – 2013
- Olympic Final Top Scorer
  - Dražen Petrović – 1992
- World Cup Final Top Scorer
  - Krešimir Ćosić – 1970
- EuroBasket Final Top Scorer
  - Krešimir Ćosić – 1973
  - Dražen Petrović – 1989
  - Dino Rađa – 1991

Other notable achievements

- FIBA Order of Merit
  - Krešimir Ćosić
- FIBA Hall of Fame
  - Krešimir Ćosić
  - Dražen Petrović
  - Toni Kukoč
- Naismith Memorial Basketball Hall of Fame
  - Krešimir Ćosić
  - Dražen Petrović
  - Dino Rađa
  - Toni Kukoč
- College Basketball Hall of Fame
  - Krešimir Ćosić
- Euroscar
  - Toni Kukoč – 1991, 1994, 1996, 1998
  - Dražen Petrović – 1992, 1993
- Mr. Europa
  - Toni Kukoč – 1991, 1992, 1996
  - Dražen Petrović – 1993
- NBA champion
  - Toni Kukoč – 1996, 1997, 1998
  - Žan Tabak – 1995
- All-NBA Team
  - Dražen Petrović – 1993
- NBA Sixth Man of the Year Award
  - Toni Kukoč – 1996
- NBA All-Defensive Second Team
  - Ivica Zubac – 2025
- NBA All-Rookie First Team
  - Dario Šarić – 2017
- NBA All-Rookie Second Team
  - Toni Kukoč – 1994
  - Dino Rađa – 1994
  - Gordan Giriček – 2003
  - Bojan Bogdanović – 2015
- EuroLeague Final Four MVP
  - Dino Rađa - 1989
  - Toni Kukoč – 1990, 1991, 1993
- EuroLeague Finals Top Scorer
  - Petar Skansi - 1972
  - Dražen Petrović - 1985
  - Toni Kukoč - 1990
- EuroLeague Top Scorer
  - Zdravko Radulović – 1993
- EuroLeague Rebounds Leader
  - Stojko Vranković – 1995
  - Žan Tabak – 1999
- EuroLeague Assists Leader
  - Ivica Marić – 2001
  - Zoran Planinić – 2013
- EuroLeague Steals Leader
  - Ivica Marić – 2001
- EuroLeague PIR Leader
  - Nikola Vujčić – 2007
- All EuroLeague First Team
  - Nikola Vujčić – 2005, 2006, 2007
  - Ante Tomić – 2013, 2014
- All EuroLeague Second Team
  - Nikola Vujčić – 2003, 2004
  - Ante Tomić – 2015
  - Mario Hezonja – 2024
- All Europe First Team
  - Nikola Vujčić – 2005, 2006
  - Bojan Bogdanović – 2013
  - Ante Tomić – 2015
- All Europe Second Team
  - Nikola Vujčić – 2004, 2007
  - Ante Tomić – 2013, 2014
- 50 Greatest EuroLeague Contributors (2008)
  - Krešimir Ćosić
  - Dražen Petrović
  - Toni Kukoč
  - Dino Rađa
- Cup Winner's Cup Finals Top Scorer
  - Andro Knego - 1982
  - Dražen Petrović - 1987, 1989
- FIBA Korać Cup Finals Top Scorer
  - Željko Jerkov - 1977
  - Dražen Petrović - 1988
- FIBA's 50 Greatest Players (1991)
  - Krešimir Ćosić
  - Toni Kukoč
  - Dražen Petrović
  - Dino Rađa
  - Petar Skansi
- FIBA All-Star Games
  - Krešimir Ćosić
  - Josip Gjergja
  - Vinko Jelovac
  - Željko Jerkov
  - Andro Knego
  - Toni Kukoč
  - Veljko Mršić
  - Dražen Petrović
  - Dino Rađa
  - Petar Skansi
  - Damir Šolman
  - Ratomir Tvrdić
  - Stojko Vranković

Coaches

=== Individual achievements ===
- FIBA Hall of Fame
  - Mirko Novosel
- Naismith Memorial Basketball Hall of Fame
  - Mirko Novosel
- Euroleague winning head coach
  - Mirko Novosel - 1985
  - Željko Pavličević - 1986, 1991

== Head-to-head record ==
=== Record against teams at the EuroBasket ===
As of 11 September 2022

| National team | Pld | W | L | PF | PA | PD |
|---|---|---|---|---|---|---|
| Belgium | 1 | 1 | 0 | 106 | 74 | +32 |
| Bosnia and Herzegovina | 3 | 2 | 1 | 243 | 229 | +14 |
| Bulgaria | 2 | 2 | 0 | 192 | 165 | +27 |
| Czech Republic | 4 | 3 | 1 | 322 | 266 | +56 |
| Estonia | 3 | 3 | 0 | 252 | 219 | +33 |
| Finland | 4 | 3 | 1 | 350 | 313 | +37 |
| France | 7 | 3 | 4 | 566 | 566 | 0 |
| (Georgia (country)) Georgia | 2 | 1 | 1 | 135 | 147 | −12 |
| Germany | 7 | 3 | 4 | 559 | 559 | 0 |
| Greece | 9 | 3 | 6 | 710 | 684 | +26 |
| (United Kingdom) Great Britain | 1 | 1 | 0 | 86 | 65 | +21 |
| Hungary | 1 | 1 | 0 | 67 | 58 | +9 |
| Israel | 2 | 1 | 1 | 161 | 159 | +2 |
| Italy | 7 | 5 | 2 | 500 | 475 | +25 |
| Latvia | 2 | 1 | 1 | 170 | 176 | −6 |
| Lithuania | 5 | 0 | 5 | 356 | 417 | −61 |
| Montenegro | 2 | 2 | 0 | 173 | 153 | +20 |
| Netherlands | 1 | 1 | 0 | 78 | 72 | +6 |
| North Macedonia | 3 | 2 | 1 | 230 | 204 | +26 |
| Poland | 2 | 1 | 1 | 150 | 147 | +3 |
| Portugal | 1 | 1 | 0 | 90 | 68 | +22 |
| Romania | 1 | 1 | 0 | 74 | 58 | +16 |
| Russia | 8 | 3 | 5 | 628 | 648 | −20 |
| Serbia | 2 | 0 | 2 | 128 | 144 | −16 |
| Slovenia | 5 | 3 | 2 | 392 | 386 | +6 |
| Spain | 7 | 2 | 5 | 500 | 572 | −72 |
| Turkey | 6 | 3 | 3 | 503 | 430 | +73 |
| Ukraine | 4 | 3 | 1 | 355 | 323 | +32 |
| Total | | | | | | 27 teams |

=== Record against teams in EuroBasket qualification ===
As of 24 February 2025

| National team | Pld | W | L | PF | PA | PD |
|---|---|---|---|---|---|---|
| Austria | 4 | 4 | 0 | 344 | 298 | +46 |
| Belarus | 1 | 1 | 0 | 112 | 72 | +40 |
| Belgium | 2 | 2 | 0 | 176 | 129 | +47 |
| Bosnia and Herzegovina | 6 | 3 | 3 | 474 | 453 | +21 |
| Bulgaria | 2 | 1 | 1 | 173 | 148 | +25 |
| Cyprus | 6 | 6 | 0 | 564 | 354 | +210 |
| Denmark | 2 | 2 | 0 | 183 | 146 | +37 |
| England | 2 | 2 | 0 | 163 | 149 | +14 |
| Estonia | 5 | 4 | 1 | 417 | 350 | +67 |
| France | 2 | 0 | 2 | 141 | 156 | −15 |
| Germany | 2 | 0 | 2 | 144 | 159 | −15 |
| Hungary | 4 | 4 | 0 | 316 | 268 | +48 |
| Iceland | 2 | 2 | 0 | 193 | 151 | +42 |
| (Republic of Ireland) Ireland | 4 | 4 | 0 | 349 | 255 | +94 |
| Latvia | 5 | 5 | 0 | 466 | 371 | +95 |
| Lithuania | 2 | 1 | 1 | 137 | 140 | −3 |
| Luxembourg | 2 | 2 | 0 | 189 | 141 | +48 |
| Netherlands | 6 | 5 | 1 | 457 | 389 | +68 |
| North Macedonia | 3 | 3 | 0 | 312 | 232 | +80 |
| Poland | 2 | 1 | 1 | 151 | 156 | −5 |
| Romania | 3 | 3 | 0 | 342 | 206 | +136 |
| Russia | 2 | 1 | 1 | 151 | 138 | +13 |
| Slovakia | 4 | 4 | 0 | 355 | 277 | +53 |
| Slovenia | 1 | 0 | 1 | 90 | 94 | −4 |
| Sweden | 6 | 5 | 1 | 479 | 417 | +62 |
| Switzerland | 4 | 4 | 0 | 324 | 236 | +88 |
| Turkey | 4 | 2 | 2 | 290 | 267 | +23 |
| Ukraine | 5 | 4 | 1 | 416 | 370 | +46 |
| Total | | | | | | 28 teams |

=== Record against teams at the World Cup ===
As of 6 September 2014

| National team | Pld | W | L | PF | PA | PD |
|---|---|---|---|---|---|---|
| Argentina | 1 | 1 | 0 | 90 | 85 | +5 |
| Australia | 1 | 1 | 0 | 83 | 69 | +14 |
| Brazil | 1 | 0 | 1 | 74 | 92 | −18 |
| Canada | 1 | 1 | 0 | 92 | 61 | +31 |
| China | 1 | 1 | 0 | 105 | 73 | +32 |
| Cuba | 1 | 1 | 0 | 85 | 65 | +20 |
| France | 1 | 0 | 1 | 64 | 69 | −5 |
| Greece | 3 | 2 | 1 | 224 | 191 | +33 |
| Iran | 1 | 1 | 0 | 75 | 54 | +21 |
| Philippines | 1 | 1 | 0 | 81 | 78 | +3 |
| Puerto Rico | 1 | 1 | 0 | 103 | 82 | +21 |
| Russia | 1 | 0 | 1 | 64 | 66 | −2 |
| Senegal | 1 | 0 | 1 | 75 | 77 | −2 |
| Serbia | 1 | 0 | 1 | 72 | 73 | −1 |
| Slovenia | 1 | 0 | 1 | 84 | 91 | −7 |
| South Korea | 1 | 1 | 0 | 104 | 53 | +51 |
| Tunisia | 1 | 1 | 0 | 84 | 64 | +20 |
| United States | 1 | 0 | 1 | 78 | 106 | −28 |
| Total | | | | | | 18 teams |

=== Record against teams in World Cup qualification ===
As of 30 August 2026

| National team | Pld | W | L | PF | PA | PD |
|---|---|---|---|---|---|---|
| Cyprus | 2 | 2 | 0 | 223 | 110 | +113 |
| Denmark | 2 | 2 | 0 | 179 | 147 | +32 |
| Finland | 2 | 0 | 2 | 150 | 158 | −8 |
| Germany | 2 | 1 | 1 | 182 | 179 | +3 |
| Hungary | 2 | 1 | 1 | 139 | 153 | −14 |
| Israel | 2 | 2 | 0 | 188 | 146 | +42 |
| Italy | 2 | 1 | 1 | 142 | 152 | −10 |
| Latvia | 1 | 1 | 0 | 115 | 80 | +35 |
| Lithuania | 2 | 0 | 2 | 145 | 163 | −18 |
| Netherlands | 3 | 2 | 1 | 244 | 245 | −3 |
| Norway | 2 | 2 | 0 | 203 | 121 | +82 |
| Poland | 2 | 0 | 2 | 143 | 156 | −13 |
| Romania | 2 | 1 | 1 | 146 | 121 | +25 |
| Slovenia | 2 | 0 | 2 | 143 | 173 | −30 |
| Sweden | 2 | 1 | 1 | 169 | 168 | +1 |
| Total | | | | | | 15 teams |

=== Record against teams at the Olympic Games ===
As of 17 August 2016

| National team | Pld | W | L | PF | PA | PD |
|---|---|---|---|---|---|---|
| Angola | 2 | 2 | 0 | 144 | 112 | +32 |
| Argentina | 3 | 1 | 2 | 225 | 242 | −17 |
| Australia | 3 | 2 | 1 | 266 | 220 | +46 |
| Brazil | 3 | 2 | 1 | 243 | 230 | +13 |
| China | 2 | 2 | 0 | 208 | 163 | +45 |
| (Commonwealth of Independent States) CIS | 1 | 1 | 0 | 75 | 74 | +1 |
| Germany | 1 | 1 | 0 | 99 | 78 | +21 |
| Iran | 1 | 1 | 0 | 91 | 57 | +34 |
| Lithuania | 3 | 1 | 2 | 244 | 250 | −6 |
| Nigeria | 1 | 0 | 1 | 76 | 90 | −14 |
| Russia | 1 | 1 | 0 | 85 | 78 | +7 |
| Serbia | 1 | 0 | 1 | 83 | 86 | −3 |
| Spain | 3 | 2 | 1 | 219 | 221 | −2 |
| United States | 3 | 0 | 3 | 226 | 322 | −96 |
| Total | 14 teams | | | | | |

=== Biggest tournament wins ===
20+ point difference

| Olympic Games | World Cup | EuroBasket |
|---|---|---|
| +34 vs. Iran (91–57) 2008; +33 vs. Australia (98–65) 1992; +31 vs. China (109–78) 1996; +23 vs. Angola (71–48) 1996; +21 vs. Germany (99–78) 1992 | +51 vs. South Korea (104–53) 1994; +32 vs. China (105–73) 1994; +31 vs. Canada (92–61) 1994; +26 vs. Greece (81–55) 1994; +21 vs. Iran (75–54) 2010; +20 vs. Cuba (85–65) 1994; +20 vs. Tunisia (84–64) 2010 | +50 vs. Turkey (113–63) 1993; +40 vs. Greece (99–59) 1993; +38 vs. Czech Republic (107–69) 2017; +32 vs. Belgium (106–74) 1993; +25 vs. Finland (88–63) 2013; +22 vs. Turkey (90–68) 1995; +22 vs. Czech Republic (86–64) 1999; +22 vs. Ukraine (93–71) 2003; +22 vs. Portugal (90–68) 2007; +21 vs. Bulgaria (104–83) 1993; +21 vs. Great Britain (86–65) 2022; +20 vs. Bosnia and Herzegovina (98–78) 1993; +20 vs. Germany (75–55) 1997 |

- Croatia also defeated Albania (94–70) for a win margin of +24 at the 2009 Mediterranean Games.

=== Biggest tournament losses ===
-20> point difference

| Olympic Games | World Cup | EuroBasket |
|---|---|---|
| -33 vs. USA (70–103) 1992; -32 vs. USA (85–117) 1992; -31 vs. USA (71–102) 1996; -24 vs. Argentina (53–77) 2008 | -28 vs. USA (78–106) 2010 | -28 vs. Spain (40–68) 2013; -26 vs. Spain (66–92) 2013; -21 vs. Czech Republic (59–80) 2015 |

=== Biggest qualification wins ===
20+ point difference

| Olympic qualification | World Cup qualification | EuroBasket qualification |
|---|---|---|
| +73 vs. Iceland (124–51) 1992; +52 vs. Portugal (109–57) 1992; +46 vs. Italy (108–62) 1992; +39 vs. Greece (102–63) 1992; +32 vs. Sweden (99–67) 2024; +31 vs. Belgium (86–55) 2024; +23 vs. Slovenia (93–70) 1992; +20 vs. Tunisia (72–52) 2016 | +73 vs. Cyprus (123–50) 2027; +49 vs. Norway (102–53) 2027; +40 vs. Cyprus (100–60) 2027; +35 vs. Latvia (115–80) 2027; +33 vs. Norway (101–68) 2027; +29 vs. Denmark (100–71) 2027; +28 vs. Israel (103–75) 2027; +27 vs. Romania (90–63) 2019 | +60 vs. Romania (115–55) 1997; +56 vs. Macedonia (128–72) 1993; +40 vs. Belarus (112–72) 1993; +40 vs. Ireland (89–49) 2025; +37 vs. Cyprus (104–67) 2025; +36 vs. Luxembourg (98–62) 2025; +34 vs. Latvia (113–79) 1993; +34 vs. Ireland (95–61) 2025; +33 vs. Romania (119–86) 1993; +31 vs. Switzerland (84–53) 2025; +29 vs. Ukraine (107–78) 1993; +29 vs. Cyprus (92–63) 2025; +25 vs. Austria (100–75) 2025 |

== See also ==
- Sport in Croatia
- Croatia women's national basketball team
- Croatia men's national under-20 basketball team
- Croatia men's national under-18 and under-19 basketball team
- Croatia men's national under-16 and under-17 basketball team
