= Cyprus men's national basketball team =

Cyprus
- FIBA ranking: 69 (1 September 2026)
- Joined FIBA: 1974
- FIBA zone: FIBA Europe
- National federation: Κυπριακή Ομοσπονδία Καλαθοσφαίρισης (CBF)
- Coach: Christophoros Livadiotis

FIBA World Cup
- Appearances: None

EuroBasket
- Appearances: 1
- Medals: None

Championship for Small Countries
- Appearances: 4
- Medals: (silver) Silver: (1990, 1994); (bronze) Bronze: (1988, 1992)

Games of the Small States of Europe
- Appearances: 16
- Medals: (gold) Gold: (1985, 1995, 1997, 2001, 2003, 2005, 2009, 2013, 2017); (silver) Silver: (1989, 1993); (bronze) Bronze: (1991, 2023)
Home	Away

First international
- Bulgaria 90–45 Cyprus (Damascus, Syria; 17 April 1982)

Biggest win
- Monaco 40–108 Cyprus (Serravalle, San Marino; 1 June 2001)

Biggest defeat
- Czech Republic 135–60 Cyprus (Prievidza, Slovakia; 22 June 1993)

The Cyprus men's national basketball team (Greek: Εθνική ομάδα μπάσκετ της Κύπρου) represents Cyprus in international basketball, and is controlled by the Cyprus Basketball Federation. The national team is coached by Christophoros Livadiotis.

Cyprus joined FIBA in 1974, where the team has mostly competed in smaller competitions such as the Games of the Small States of Europe, winning it nine times. Cyprus made their debut at the top continental competition, EuroBasket, as co-hosts in 2025.

== History ==
Cyprus made its first appearance on the international scene in qualification for EuroBasket 1983. Although the national team would come up short in their attempt, with an (0–4) record. Furthermore, Cyprus has taken part at lower level tournaments, where they have been impressive. Cyprus has won two bronze medals, and two silver medals at the European Championship for Small Countries, while also taking home one bronze, two silver, and nine gold medals at the Games of the Small States of Europe.

During the first few decades on the international level for Cyprus, the national team went through multiple futile qualifying cycles which saw the team unable to successfully qualify for the EuroBasket. For qualification to EuroBasket 2017, Cyprus was placed into Group A during the qualifiers; although the team would once again be rebuffed at reaching the continental stage. Cyprus would ultimately finish up with a (2–4) record, with their only two victories coming against Switzerland.

Cyprus took part in qualifying for EuroBasket 2022, and was drawn into Group C for the first round of pre-qualifiers. The first test for the national team was against Portugal, at home in Nicosia. Cyprus would eventually prevail, in a tough match 69–67. Looking to stay perfect, the team played their next match on the road at Luxembourg. Immediately, Cyprus would run out to a big first quarter lead, and never looked back, winning 53–67. Cyprus dropped their final two matches of group play, to finish with a (2–2) record to advance.

During the second round of pre-qualifiers, Cyprus was placed into Group D, with Austria, and Great Britain. However, the national team failed to win a match, and finished with an (0–4) record. Cyprus blew an opportunity to advance to the final stage of qualifiers, but would have one more chance to make amends in the third round.

Heading into the final window of pre-qualifiers, Cyprus needed to finish top of Group F, if they were to achieve their goal. Unfortunately, the team would duplicate the results attained in the second round, with an (0–4) record once again. Cyprus ended the pre-qualifying process at a record of (2–10) overall, eliminating their opportunity to advance. After failing to qualify for EuroBasket 2022, Cyprus went through European Pre-Qualifiers for the 2023 FIBA World Cup. However, they finished (1–5) during the first round to be eliminated.

In March 2022, Cyprus qualified for the EuroBasket for the first time in their history, by being awarded as one of the co-hosts for the group stage at EuroBasket 2025. Matches were played at the Spyros Kyprianou Athletic Center in Limassol.

== Competitive record ==
=== FIBA World Cup ===
World Cup					Qualification		
Year	Position	Pld	W	L	Pld	W	L
1950 to 1974	No national representative						
(Philippines) 1978	Did not enter				Did not enter		
(Colombia) 1982	Did not enter				Did not enter		
(Spain) 1986	Did not enter				Did not enter		
(Argentina) 1990	Did not enter				Did not enter		
(Canada) 1994	Did not qualify				EuroBasket served as qualifiers		
(Greece) 1998	Did not qualify				EuroBasket served as qualifiers		
(United States) 2002	Did not qualify				EuroBasket served as qualifiers		
(Japan) 2006	Did not qualify				EuroBasket served as qualifiers		
(Turkey) 2010	Did not qualify				EuroBasket served as qualifiers		
(Spain) 2014	Did not qualify				EuroBasket served as qualifiers		
(China) 2019	Did not enter				Did not enter		
(Philippines) (Japan) (Indonesia) 2023	Did not qualify				6	1	5
(Qatar) 2027	Did not qualify				6	0	6
(France) 2031	To be determined				To be determined		
Total	0/13				12	1	11

=== Games of the Small States of Europe ===
Games of the Small States of Europe
Year	Position	Pld	W	L
(San Marino) 1985	1st place, gold medalist(s)	3	3	0
(Monaco) 1987	5th	3	1	2
(Cyprus) 1989	2nd place, silver medalist(s)	4	2	2
(Andorra) 1991	3rd place, bronze medalist(s)	4	2	2
(Malta) 1993	2nd place, silver medalist(s)	5	4	1
(Luxembourg) 1995	1st place, gold medalist(s)	4	4	0
(Iceland) 1997	1st place, gold medalist(s)	4	3	1
(San Marino) 2001	1st place, gold medalist(s)	4	4	0
(Malta) 2003	1st place, gold medalist(s)	4	4	0
(Andorra) 2005	1st place, gold medalist(s)	4	4	0
(Monaco) 2007	Disqualified	5	3	2
(Cyprus) 2009	1st place, gold medalist(s)	5	5	0
(Luxembourg) 2013	1st place, gold medalist(s)	4	4	0
(San Marino) 2017	1st place, gold medalist(s)	5	5	0
(Montenegro) 2019	5th	4	0	4
(Malta) 2023	3rd place, bronze medalist(s)	5	2	3
Total		67	50	17

=== EuroBasket ===
EuroBasket					Qualification		
Year	Position	Pld	W	L	Pld	W	L
1935 to 1973	No national representative						
(Socialist Federal Republic of Yugoslavia) 1975	Did not enter				Did not enter		
(Belgium) 1977	Did not enter				Did not enter		
(Italy) 1979	Did not enter				Did not enter		
(Czechoslovakia) 1981	Did not enter				Did not enter		
(France) 1983	Did not qualify				4	0	4
(West Germany) 1985	Did not qualify				5	2	3
(Greece) 1987	Did not qualify				4	0	4
(Socialist Federal Republic of Yugoslavia) 1989	Did not enter				Did not enter		
(Italy) 1991	Did not enter				Did not enter		
(Germany) 1993	Did not qualify				6	2	4
(Greece) 1995	Did not qualify				5	0	5
(Spain) 1997	Did not qualify				6	2	4
(France) 1999	Did not qualify				8	3	5
(Turkey) 2001	Did not qualify				11	5	6
(Sweden) 2003	Did not qualify				15	4	11
(Serbia and Montenegro) 2005	Division B				6	3	3
(Spain) 2007	Division B				6	1	5
(Poland) 2009	Division B				8	3	5
(Lithuania) 2011	Division B				6	0	6
(Slovenia) 2013	Did not qualify				8	0	8
(France) (Croatia) (Germany) (Latvia) 2015	Did not enter				Did not enter		
(Finland) (Israel) (Romania) (Turkey) 2017	Did not qualify				6	2	4
(Czech Republic) (Georgia (country)) (Italy) (Germany) 2022	Did not qualify				12	2	10
(Cyprus) (Finland) (Poland) (Latvia) 2025	24th	5	0	5	18	1	17
(Estonia) (Greece) (Slovenia) (Spain) 2029	To be determined				In progress		
Total	1/24	5	0	5	134	30	104

=== Championship for Small Countries ===
FIBA European Championship for Small Countries
Year	Position	Pld	W	L
(Malta) 1988	3rd place, bronze medalist(s)	5	4	1
(Wales) 1990	2nd place, silver medalist(s)	5	3	2
(Cyprus) 1992	3rd place, bronze medalist(s)	5	4	1
(Republic of Ireland) 1994	2nd place, silver medalist(s)	5	4	1
Total		20	15	5

== Results and fixtures ==
Win Loss

=== 2025 ===
28 November 2025 2027 FIBA World Cup qualifiers – 1st round	Croatia	100–60	Cyprus	Osijek, Croatia
19:00 (UTC+1)	Scoring by quarter: 28–8, 19–19, 28–23, 25–10
	Pts: Hezonja 25; Rebs: Prkačin 8 Asts: Mavra 7	Boxscore	Pts: F. Tigkas 14; Rebs: Jung 9 Asts: Michail 6	Arena: Gradski vrt Hall; Attendance: 2,000; Referees: Péter Praksch (HUN), Alberto Sánchez (ESP), Ivor Matějek (CZE)

1 December 2025 2027 FIBA World Cup qualifiers – 1st round	Cyprus	64–83	Germany	Limassol, Cyprus
19:00 (UTC+2)	Scoring by quarter: 17–20, 22–22, 9–27, 16–14
	Pts: Stylianou 16; Rebs: Michail 6 Asts: Michail 4	Boxscore	Pts: Krämer, Pape 14; Rebs: Krämer 10; Asts: Kayil 5	Arena: Spyros Kyprianou Athletic Center; Attendance: 950; Referees: Lorenzo Baldini (ITA), Zdenko Tomašovič (SVK), Elvis Binders-Čoders (LAT)

=== 2026 ===
27 February 2026 2027 FIBA World Cup qualifiers – 1st round	Israel	94–54	Cyprus	Limassol, Cyprus
21:00 (UTC+2)	Scoring by quarter: 32–15, 26–8, 13–16, 23–15
	Pts: Madar 22; Rebs: Zalmanson 8 Asts: Zalmanson 6	Boxscore	Pts: F. Tigkas 12; Rebs: Koumis 7 Asts: Michail 4	Arena: Spyros Kyprianou Athletic Center; Referees: Mihkel Männiste (EST), Gintaras Mačiulis (LTU), Viola Györgyi (NOR)

1 March 2026 2027 FIBA World Cup qualifiers – 1st round	Cyprus	54–83	Israel	Limassol, Cyprus
19:00 (UTC+2)	Scoring by quarter: 12–24, 17–21, 13–23, 12–15
	Pts: F. Tigkas 15; Rebs: Koumis 8 Asts: Varsos 4	Boxscore	Pts: three players 13; Rebs: Sorkin 11; Asts: Carrington 6	Arena: Spyros Kyprianou Athletic Center; Attendance: 800; Referees: Marius Ciulin (ROU), Valentin Oliot (FRA), Silvia Marziali (ITA)

3 July 2026 2027 FIBA World Cup qualifiers – 1st round	Cyprus	50–123	Croatia	Limassol, Cyprus
20:00 (UTC+3)	Scoring by quarter: 12–35, 14–24, 10–33, 14–31
	Pts: S. Tigkas 10; Rebs: Mantovani, Pasiali 4 Asts: five players 2	Boxscore	Pts: Zubac 24; Rebs: Zubac 11; Asts: Hezonja 12	Arena: Spyros Kyprianou Athletic Center; Attendance: 1,000; Referees: Lorenzo Baldini (ITA), Ivor Matějek (CZE), Rainis Värv (EST)

6 July 2026 2027 FIBA World Cup qualifiers – 1st round	Germany	111–79	Cyprus	Bamberg, Germany
19:00 (UTC+2)	Scoring by quarter: 22–21, 34–10, 30–25, 25–23
	Pts: Schröder 20; Rebs: Sengfelder 10; Asts: Schröder 9	Boxscore	Pts: Giannaras, F. Tigkas 14; Rebs: Mantovani 5 Asts: Giannaras, Iliadis 4	Arena: Brose Arena; Attendance: 5,713; Referees: Dariusz Zapolski (POL), Blaž Zupančič (SVN), Tomasz Langowski (POL)

27 August 2026 EuroBasket 2029 pre-qualifiers – 2nd round	Cyprus	77–72	Austria	Limassol, Cyprus
19:00 (UTC+3)	Scoring by quarter: 16–20, 20–21, 20–14, 21–17
	Pts: F. Tigkas 25; Rebs: Pasiali 10; Asts: Michail 8	Boxscore	Pts: Mbemba 19; Rebs: Mbemba 10; Asts: Friedrich 4	Arena: Spyros Kyprianou Athletic Center; Attendance: 1,000; Referees: Marius Ciulin (ROU), Branimir Galić (CRO), Nemanja Ninković (SRB)

26 November 2026 EuroBasket 2029 pre-qualifiers – 2nd round	North Macedonia	vs.	Cyprus	Skopje, North Macedonia
18:00 (UTC+1)
		Boxscore		Arena: Lazar Lečić Sports Hall

29 November 2026 EuroBasket 2029 pre-qualifiers – 2nd round	Austria	vs.	Cyprus	Vienna, Austria
18:00 (UTC+1)
		Boxscore		Arena: Sport Arena Wien

=== 2027 ===
28 February 2027 EuroBasket 2029 pre-qualifiers – 2nd round	Cyprus	vs.	North Macedonia	Cyprus
--:-- (UTC+2)
		Boxscore

== Team ==
=== Current roster ===
Roster for the EuroBasket 2029 Pre-Qualifiers match on 27 August 2026 against Austria.

Cyprus men's national basketball team roster
Players
Coaches

Pos.	No.	Name	Age – Date of birth	Height	Club	Ctr.
PG	2	Charis Giannaras	35 – 2 June 1991	1.83 m (6 ft 0 in)	Paralimni	(Cyprus)
F	4	Ioannis Pasiali	28 – 1 November 1997	2.01 m (6 ft 7 in)	Keravnos	(Cyprus)
PG	5	Simon Michail	34 – 19 June 1992	1.83 m (6 ft 0 in)	Keravnos	(Cyprus)
G	6	Stefanos Iliadis	31 – 17 September 1994	1.87 m (6 ft 2 in)	Apollon	(Cyprus)
SG	8	Panagiotis Markou	30 – 1 February 1996	1.92 m (6 ft 4 in)	AEK Larnaca	(Cyprus)
PG	10	Ioannis Giannaras	27 – 27 March 1999	1.87 m (6 ft 2 in)	AEK Larnaca	(Cyprus)
C	11	Michalis Koumis	29 – 8 November 1996	2.02 m (6 ft 8 in)	Keravnos	(Cyprus)
PG	13	Filippos Tigkas	23 – 5 November 2002	1.84 m (6 ft 0 in)	Mykonos	(Greece)
PF	22	Solonas Angeli	23 – 1 August 2003	2.03 m (6 ft 8 in)	APOEL	(Cyprus)
G	23	Stefanos Tigkas	20 – 28 December 2005	1.85 m (6 ft 1 in)	Keravnos	(Cyprus)
F	24	Pano Pavlidis	25 – 30 September 2000	2.03 m (6 ft 8 in)	AEK Larnaca	(Cyprus)
F/C	68	Roberto Mantovani	32 – 4 January 1994	2.03 m (6 ft 8 in)	APOEL	(Cyprus)

Head coach

- (Cyprus) Christophoros Livadiotis

Assistant coach(es)

- (Cyprus) Michael Matsentides
- (Cyprus) Giorgos Palalas

Legend

- (C) Team captain
- Club – describes last
  club before the competition
- Age – describes age
  on 27 August 2026

=== Depth chart ===
Pos.	Starting 5	Bench 1	Bench 2	Bench 3
C	Michalis Koumis	Christos Loizides	Darral Willis	Kyprianos Maragkos
PF	Roberto Mantovani	Ioannis Pasiali	Aeneas Jung	Pavlos Stavrinides
SF	Nikos Stylianou	Zayd Muosa	Gavriel Kilaras	Rafail Eleftheriou
SG	Konstantinos Simitzis	Antreas Christodoulou	Panagiotis Markou	Ioannis Giannaras
PG	Filippos Tigkas	Simon Michail	Stefanos Iliadis	Iakovos Panteli

== Head coach position ==
- (Cyprus) Christos Stylianidis – (2007–2011)
- (Cyprus) Antonis Konstantinides – (2012)
- (Cyprus) Panagiotis Yiannaras – (2013–2017)
- (Cyprus) Linos Gavriel – (2017–2021)
- (Cyprus) Michael Matsentides – (2022, Interim)
- (Cyprus) Christophoros Livadiotis – (2022–present)

== Past rosters ==
2025 EuroBasket: finished 24th among 24 teams

Cyprus men's national basketball team roster
Players
Coaches

Pos.	No.	Name	Age – Date of birth	Height	Club	Ctr.
C	1	Christos Loizides	34 – 26 May 1991	2.04 m (6 ft 8 in)	AEK Larnaca	(Cyprus)
PG	3	Konstantinos Simitzis	30 – 12 August 1995	1.84 m (6 ft 0 in)	AEK Larnaca	(Cyprus)
PF	4	Ioannis Pasiali	27 – 1 November 1997	2.02 m (6 ft 8 in)	Keravnos	(Cyprus)
PG	5	Simon Michail	33 – 19 June 1992	1.83 m (6 ft 0 in)	Keravnos	(Cyprus)
PG	6	Stefanos Iliadis	30 – 17 September 1994	1.87 m (6 ft 2 in)	Apollon	(Cyprus)
SF	7	Antreas Christodoulou	30 – 22 February 1995	1.97 m (6 ft 6 in)	AEL	(Cyprus)
F	9	Aeneas Jung	23 – 13 February 2002	2.03 m (6 ft 8 in)	VfL Kirchheim Knights	(Germany)
PG	10	Ioannis Giannaras	26 – 27 March 1999	1.87 m (6 ft 2 in)	AEK Larnaca	(Cyprus)
C	11	Michalis Koumis	28 – 8 November 1996	2.02 m (6 ft 8 in)	Keravnos	(Cyprus)
PG	13	Filippos Tigkas	22 – 5 November 2002	1.84 m (6 ft 0 in)	Keravnos	(Cyprus)
C	21	Darral Willis	29 – 21 January 1996	2.06 m (6 ft 9 in)	Taipei Taishin Mars	(Taiwan)
F	99	Nikos Stylianou (C)	36 – 9 November 1988	1.98 m (6 ft 6 in)	Keravnos	(Cyprus)

Head coach

- (Cyprus) Christophoros Livadiotis

Assistant coach(es)

- (Cyprus) Michael Matsentides
- (Uruguay) Pablo Cano da Costa
- (Cyprus) Stelios Gregoriou

Legend

- (C) Team captain
- Club – describes last
  club before the competition
- Age – describes age
  on 28 August 2025

== Kit ==
=== Manufacturer ===
- 2012–2015: Champion
- 2015–2018: Legea
- 2019–present: Caan Athletics

== See also ==
- Sport in Cyprus
- Cyprus women's national basketball team
- Cyprus men's national under-20 basketball team
- Cyprus men's national under-18 basketball team
- Cyprus men's national under-16 basketball team
