= FIBA EuroBasket 1993 qualification =

Qualification for the 1993 FIBA European Championship, commonly called FIBA EuroBasket 1993 took place between 1 May 1991 and 7 June 1993. A total of thirteen teams qualified for the tournament, joining Italy, Spain and France ranked second, third and fourth in the 1991 edition. Yugoslavia as title holder was excluded from all international sport competitions because of sanctions against Federal Republic of Yugoslavia.

== Format ==
A total of 39 teams participated. Competition consisted of three stages:

- A qualifying round that consisted of twelve teams divided in two round robin tournament that took place in Reykjavík-Iceland and Neuchâtel-Switzerland between 1 May and 12 May 1991.
- A challenge round where the first and second teams from each of the two groups from the Qualifying Round joined another twelve teams. All sixteen teams where then divided in four round robin groups of four teams each. This stage took place between 13 November 1991 and 18 November 1992 and competition consisted of home and away legs, taking place in each of the participating countries. The top two teams from each group qualified for EuroBasket 1993.
- A pre-European tournament – Due to politic changes in Eastern Europe caused by breaks of two big countries, Soviet Union and Yugoslavia, which dominated in European basketball in recent decades, FIBA Europe organized an additional qualifying tournament, that took place in Wrocław, Poland, between 30 May 1993 and 7 Jun 1993, in order to enable the new countries the participation at championship. The third classified from each of the four groups from the Challenge Round joined another eleven teams. All fifteen teams where divided in four round robin tournament. The first two teams of each group have been divided into two round robin groups of four teams each. The top three teams of each groups have participated to Finals where the top five teams qualified for EuroBasket 1993.

== Qualifying round ==
Qualified for the Challenge Round

=== Group A (Reykjavík, Iceland) ===
Team	Pld	W	L	PF	PA	PD	Pts	Tie
Denmark	4	3	1	315	297	+18	7	1–0
Portugal	4	3	1	283	243	+40	7	0–1
Finland	4	2	2	299	290	+9	6	1–0
Iceland	4	2	2	348	334	+14	6	0–1
Norway	4	0	4	302	383	−81	4	

Rules=1) Points; 2) Head-to-head results; 3) Points difference; 4) Points scored.

1 May 1991

Denmark	77–85	Iceland
Scoring by half: 34–35, 43–50

Reykjavík, Iceland

1 May 1991

Portugal	60–52	Finland
Scoring by half: 30–10, 30–42

Reykjavik

2 May 1991

Denmark	89–87	Norway
Scoring by half: 30–41, 59–46

Reykjavik

2 May 1991

Iceland	70–86	Portugal
Scoring by half: 30–46, 40–40

Reykjavik

3 May 1991

Norway	73–102	Finland
Scoring by half: 32–50, 41–52

Reykjavik

3 May 1991

Denmark	69–61	Portugal
Scoring by half: 38–23, 31–38

Reykjavik

4 May 1991

Norway	90–116	Iceland
Scoring by half: 39–57, 51–59

Reykjavik

4 May 1991

Finland	64–80	Denmark
Scoring by half: 33–39, 31–41

Reykjavik

5 May 1991

Portugal	76–52	Norway
Scoring by half: 44–32, 32–20

Reykjavik

5 May 1991

Iceland	77–81	Finland
Scoring by half: 40–40, 37–41

Reykjavik

=== Group B (Neuchâtel, Switzerland) ===
Team	Pld	W	L	PF	PA	PD	Pts	Tie
Hungary	6	6	0	523	403	+120	12	
Turkey	6	5	1	534	397	+137	11	
Switzerland	6	4	2	503	480	+23	10	
Cyprus	6	2	4	445	521	−76	8	1-1, +9
Scotland	6	2	4	455	477	−22	8	1-1, +2
Austria	6	2	4	408	503	−95	8	1-1, -11
Luxembourg	6	0	6	409	496	−87	6	

Rules=1) Points; 2) Head-to-head results; 3) Points difference; 4) Points scored.

6 May 1991

Cyprus	67–89	Turkey
Scoring by half: 33–44, 34–45

Neuchâtel

6 May 1991

Luxembourg	65–85	Hungary
Scoring by half: 26–36, 39–49

Neuchâtel

6 May 1991

Switzerland	89–83 (OT)	Scotland
Scoring by half: 36–35, 32–33 Overtime: 8–8, 13–7

Neuchâtel

7 May 1991

Austria	57–74	Hungary
Scoring by half: 24–39, 33–35

Neuchâtel

7 May 1991

Cyprus	68–83	Switzerland
Scoring by half: 32–37, 36–46

Neuchâtel

7 May 1991

Luxembourg	63–74	Scotland
Scoring by half: 31–39, 32–35

Neuchâtel

8 May 1991

Turkey	87–74	Switzerland
Scoring by half: 44–32, 43–42

Neuchâtel

8 May 1991

Austria	71–85	Scotland
Scoring by half: 34–50, 37–35

Neuchâtel

8 May 1991

Cyprus	71–69	Luxembourg
Scoring by half: 32–40, 39–29

Neuchâtel

9 May 1991

Hungary	80–68	Scotland
Scoring by half: 37–33, 43–35

Neuchâtel

9 May 1991

Turkey	98–65	Luxembourg
Scoring by half: 46–30, 52–35

Neuchâtel

9 May 1991

Austria	79–76	Cyprus
Scoring by half: 42–29, 37–47

Neuchâtel

10 May 1991

Switzerland	92–80	Luxembourg
Scoring by half: 52–41, 40–39

Neuchâtel

10 May 1991

Hungary	122–72	Cyprus
Scoring by half: 58–34, 64–38

Neuchâtel

10 May 1991

Turkey	107–52	Austria
Scoring by half: 47–25, 60–27

Neuchâtel

11 May 1991

Scotland	79–91	Cyprus
Scoring by half: 45–37, 34–54

Neuchâtel

11 May 1991

Switzerland	94–73	Austria
Scoring by half: 47–41, 47–32

Neuchâtel

11 May 1991

Hungary	73–70	Turkey
Scoring by half: 43–32, 30–38

Neuchâtel

12 May 1991

Luxembourg	67–76	Austria
Scoring by half: 37–37, 30–39

Neuchâtel

12 May 1991

Scotland	66–83	Turkey
Scoring by half: 33–50, 33–33

Neuchâtel

12 May 1991

Switzerland	71–89	Hungary
Scoring by half: 38–44, 33–45

Neuchâtel

== Challenge Round ==
Qualified for EuroBasket 1993

=== Group A ===
Team	Pld	W	L	PF	PA	PD	Pts	Tie
Turkey	6	4	2	484	484	0	10	1-1, +4
Belgium	6	4	2	426	407	+19	10	1-1, -4
Czechoslovakia	6	2	4	506	498	+8	8	1-1, +6
Netherlands	6	2	4	471	498	−27	8	1-1 -6

Rules=1) Points; 2) Head-to-head results; 3) Points difference; 4) Points scored.

13 Nov 1991

Turkey	78–90	Czechoslovakia
Scoring by half: 37–37, 41–53

13 Nov 1991

Netherlands	65–59	Belgium
Scoring by half: 32–32, 33–27

16 Nov 1991

Belgium	82–74	Turkey
Scoring by half: 36–40, 46–34

16 Nov 1991

Czechoslovakia	93–81	Netherlands
Scoring by half: 42–45, 51–36

20 Nov 1991

Turkey	91–90	Netherlands
Scoring by half: 50–40, 41–50

20 Nov 1991

Belgium	77–75	Czechoslovakia
Scoring by half: 41–41, 36–34

11 Nov 1992

Belgium	79–54	Netherlands
Scoring by half: 29–19, 50–35

11 Nov 1992

Czechoslovakia	84–90 (OT)	Turkey
Scoring by half: 36–31, 40–45 Overtime: 8–14

14 Nov 1992

Turkey	66–54	Belgium
Scoring by half: 28–34, 38–20

14 Nov 1992

Netherlands	97–91	Czechoslovakia
Scoring by half: 55–44, 42–47

18 Nov 1992

Czechoslovakia	73–75	Belgium
Scoring by half: 38–48, 35–27

18 Nov 1992

Netherlands	84–85	Turkey
Scoring by half: 33–38, 51–47

=== Group B ===
Team	Pld	W	L	PF	PA	PD	Pts
Israel	6	5	1	566	506	+60	11
Germany	6	4	2	545	458	+87	10
Poland	6	3	3	511	533	−22	9
Portugal	6	0	6	439	564	−125	6

13 Nov 1991

Germany	101–84	Israel
Scoring by half: 48–42, 53–42

13 Nov 1991

Portugal	67–82	Poland
Scoring by half: 29–41, 38–41

16 Nov 1991

Israel	102–76	Portugal
Scoring by half: 49–32, 53–44

16 Nov 1991

Poland	89–83	Germany
Scoring by half: 39–44, 50–39

20 Nov 1991

Israel	109–85	Poland
Scoring by half: 57–34, 52–51

20 Nov 1991

Portugal	68–94	Germany
Scoring by half: 42–47, 26–47

10 Nov 1992

Israel	83–74	Germany
Scoring by half: 41–34, 42–40

10 Nov 1992

Poland	90–89	Portugal
Scoring by half: 49–45, 41–44

14 Nov 1992

Germany	99–80	Poland
Scoring by half: 46–37, 53–43

14 Nov 1992

Portugal	85–102	Israel
Scoring by half: 54–49, 31–53

18 Nov 1992

Germany	94–54	Portugal
Scoring by half: 52–28, 42–26

18 Nov 1992

Poland	85–86	Israel
Scoring by half: 43–36, 42–50

=== Group C ===
Team	Pld	W	L	PF	PA	PD	Pts	Tie
Bulgaria	6	4	2	496	453	+43	10	2-2, +10
Russia	6	4	2	526	427	+99	10	2-2, +5
England	6	4	2	444	423	+21	10	2-2, -15
Denmark	6	0	6	416	579	−163	6	

Rules=1) Points; 2) Head-to-head results; 3) Points difference; 4) Points scored.

13 Nov 1991

CIS	77–74	England
Scoring by half: 37–44, 40–30

13 Nov 1991

Denmark	73–81	Bulgaria
Scoring by half: 39–47, 34–34

16 Nov 1991

Bulgaria	75–69	CIS
Scoring by half: 32–42, 43–27

16 Nov 1991

England	84–65	Denmark
Scoring by half: 43–33, 41–32

20 Nov 1991

England	62–53	Bulgaria
Scoring by half: 26–23, 36–30

20 Nov 1991

Denmark	48–103	CIS
Scoring by half: 27–51, 21–52

11 Nov 1992

Bulgaria	115–90	Denmark
Scoring by half: 50–47, 65–43

11 Nov 1992

England	75–71	Russia
Scoring by half: 34–32, 41–39

14 Nov 1992

Russia	90–78	Bulgaria
Scoring by half: 40–51, 50–27

14 Nov 1992

Denmark	63–80	England
Scoring by half: 30–36, 33–44

18 Nov 1992

Bulgaria	94–69	England
Scoring by half: 44–38, 50–31

18 Nov 1992

Russia	116–77	Denmark
Scoring by half: 63–43, 53–34

=== Group D ===
Team	Pld	W	L	PF	PA	PD	Pts
Greece	6	5	1	541	449	+92	11
Sweden	6	4	2	482	488	−6	10
Romania	6	2	4	490	512	−22	8
Hungary	6	1	5	440	504	−64	7

13 Nov 1991

Sweden	80–78	Romania
Scoring by half: 47–50, 33–28

13 Nov 1991

Hungary	73–85	Greece
Scoring by half: 29–52, 44–33

16 Nov 1991

Greece	95–72	Sweden
Scoring by half: 46–33, 49–39

16 Nov 1991

Romania	88–77	Hungary
Scoring by half: 48–43, 40–34

20 Nov 1991

Romania	73–82	Greece
Scoring by half: 37–28, 36–54 overtime

20 Nov 1991

Hungary	58–64	Sweden
Scoring by half: 37–37, 21–27

11 Nov 1992

Greece	83–68	Hungary
Scoring by half: 49–26, 34–42

11 Nov 1992

Romania	99–71	Sweden
Scoring by half: 43–32, 56–39

14 Nov 1992

Sweden	90–81	Greece
Scoring by half: 40–51, 50–30

14 Nov 1992

Hungary	87–79	Romania
Scoring by half: 43–35, 44–44

18 Nov 1992

Greece	115–73	Romania
Scoring by half: 53–47, 62–26

18 Nov 1992

Sweden	105–77	Hungary
Scoring by half: 48–30, 57–47

== Pre-European Tournament (Wrocław-POL) ==
Qualified for the Final Round

=== Group A ===
Team	Pld	W	L	PF	PA	PD	Pts
Croatia	3	3	0	341	247	+94	6
Estonia	3	2	1	269	238	+31	5
Romania	3	1	2	257	303	−46	4
Macedonia	3	0	3	210	289	−79	3

30 May 1993

Estonia	74–60	Macedonia
Scoring by half: 38–32, 36–28

Wrocław

30 May 1993

Romania	86–119	Croatia
Scoring by half: 44–59, 42–60

Wrocław

31 May 1993

Romania	87–75	Macedonia
Scoring by half: 42–45, 45–30

Wrocław

31 May 1993

Croatia	94–86	Estonia
Scoring by half: 53–41, 41–45

Wrocław

1 Jun 1993

Croatia	128–75	Macedonia
Scoring by half: 61–44, 67–31

Wrocław

1 Jun 1993

Estonia	109–84	Romania
Scoring by half: 50–40, 59–44

Wrocław

=== Group B ===
Team	Pld	W	L	PF	PA	PD	Pts
Poland	2	1	1	180	177	+3	3
Belarus	2	1	1	163	161	+2	3
Lithuania	2	1	1	182	187	−5	3

30 May 1993

Poland	99–102	Lithuania
Scoring by half: 44–53, 55–49

Wrocław

31 May 1993

Belarus	88–80	Lithuania
Scoring by half: 43–42, 45–38

Wrocław

1 Jun 1993

Belarus	75–81	Poland
Scoring by half: 33–51, 42–30

Wrocław

=== Group C ===
Team	Pld	W	L	PF	PA	PD	Pts
Ukraine	3	3	0	238	213	+25	6
Bosnia and Herzegovina	3	2	1	277	225	+52	5
Slovakia	3	1	2	238	264	−26	4
England	3	0	3	248	299	−51	3

30 May 1993

Ukraine	87–76	England
Scoring by half: 36–32, 51–44

Wrocław

30 May 1993

Bosnia and Herzegovina	97–69	Slovakia
Scoring by half: 39–28, 58–41

Wrocław

31 May 1993

Ukraine	76–69	Slovakia
Scoring by half: 38–33, 38–36

Wrocław

31 May 1993

Bosnia and Herzegovina	112–81	England
Scoring by half: 62–34, 50–47

Wrocław

1 Jun 1993

Ukraine	75–68	Bosnia and Herzegovina
Scoring by half: 34–33, 41–35

Wrocław

1 Jun 1993

Slovakia	100–91	England
Scoring by half: 40–48, 60–43

Wrocław

=== Group D ===
Team	Pld	W	L	PF	PA	PD	Pts
Slovenia	3	3	0	322	214	+108	6
Latvia	3	2	1	279	261	+18	5
Czech Republic	3	1	2	272	250	+22	4
Moldova	3	0	3	200	348	−148	3

30 May 1993

Latvia	110–64	Moldova
Scoring by half: 47–31, 63–33

Wrocław

30 May 1993

Czech Republic	65–94	Slovenia
Scoring by half: 30–45, 35–49

Wrocław

31 May 1993

Czech Republic	126–69	Moldova
Scoring by half: 62–39, 64–30

Wrocław

31 May 1993

Slovenia	116–82	Latvia
Scoring by half: 52–33, 64–49

Wrocław

1 Jun 1993

Latvia	87–81	Czech Republic
Scoring by half: 45–47, 42–34

Wrocław

1 Jun 1993

Slovenia	112–67	Moldova
Scoring by half: 57–36, 55–31

Wrocław

== Final Round (Wrocław-POL) ==
Qualified for the Finals

=== Group E ===
Team	Pld	W	L	PF	PA	PD	Pts
Croatia	3	3	0	332	229	+103	6
Latvia	3	2	1	250	267	−17	5
Ukraine	3	1	2	233	246	−13	4
Belarus	3	0	3	212	285	−73	3

3 Jun 1993

Ukraine	80–61	Belarus
Scoring by half: 36–39, 44–22

Wrocław

3 Jun 1993

Croatia	113–79	Latvia

Wrocław

4 Jun 1993

Latvia	78–75	Ukraine

Wrocław

4 Jun 1993

Belarus	72–112	Croatia

Wrocław

5 Jun 1993

Belarus	79–93	Latvia
Scoring by half: 29–39, 50–54

Wrocław

5 Jun 1993

Croatia	107–78	Ukraine

Wrocław

=== Group F ===
Team	Pld	W	L	PF	PA	PD	Pts
Slovenia	3	3	0	299	244	+55	6
Bosnia and Herzegovina	3	2	1	259	255	+4	5
Estonia	3	1	2	258	281	−23	4
Poland	3	0	3	268	304	−36	3

3 Jun 1993

Bosnia and Herzegovina	87–77	Poland
Scoring by half: 41–38, 46–39

Wrocław

3 Jun 1993

Slovenia	97–65	Estonia
Scoring by half: 44–32, 53–33

Wrocław

4 Jun 1993

Bosnia and Herzegovina	78–91	Slovenia
Scoring by half: 47–51, 31–40

Wrocław

4 Jun 1993

Estonia	106–90	Poland
Scoring by half: 50–36, 56–54

Wrocław

5 Jun 1993

Poland	101–111	Slovenia

Wrocław

5 Jun 1993

Estonia	87–94	Bosnia and Herzegovina
Scoring by half: 39–42, 48–52

Wrocław

=== Final ===
6 Jun 1993

Croatia	90–94	Slovenia

Wrocław

=== Places 3–5 ===
6 Jun 1993

Latvia	87–97	Estonia
Scoring by half: 58–58, 29–39

Wrocław

6 Jun 1993

Bosnia and Herzegovina	74–66	Ukraine

Wrocław

=== Places 5–6 ===
7 Jun 1993

Latvia	97–81	Ukraine

Wrocław

== Final standings ==
Qualified for the EuroBasket 1993

Rank	Team
1	Slovenia
2	Croatia
3	Bosnia and Herzegovina
4	Estonia
5	Latvia
6	Ukraine
7	Poland
8	Belarus
9	Czech Republic
10	Lithuania
11	Slovakia
12	Romania
13	England
14	Macedonia
15	Moldova
