= Michael Matsentides =

Greek-Cypriot basketball coach (born 1980)

Michael Matsentides Μιχάλης Ματσεντίδης
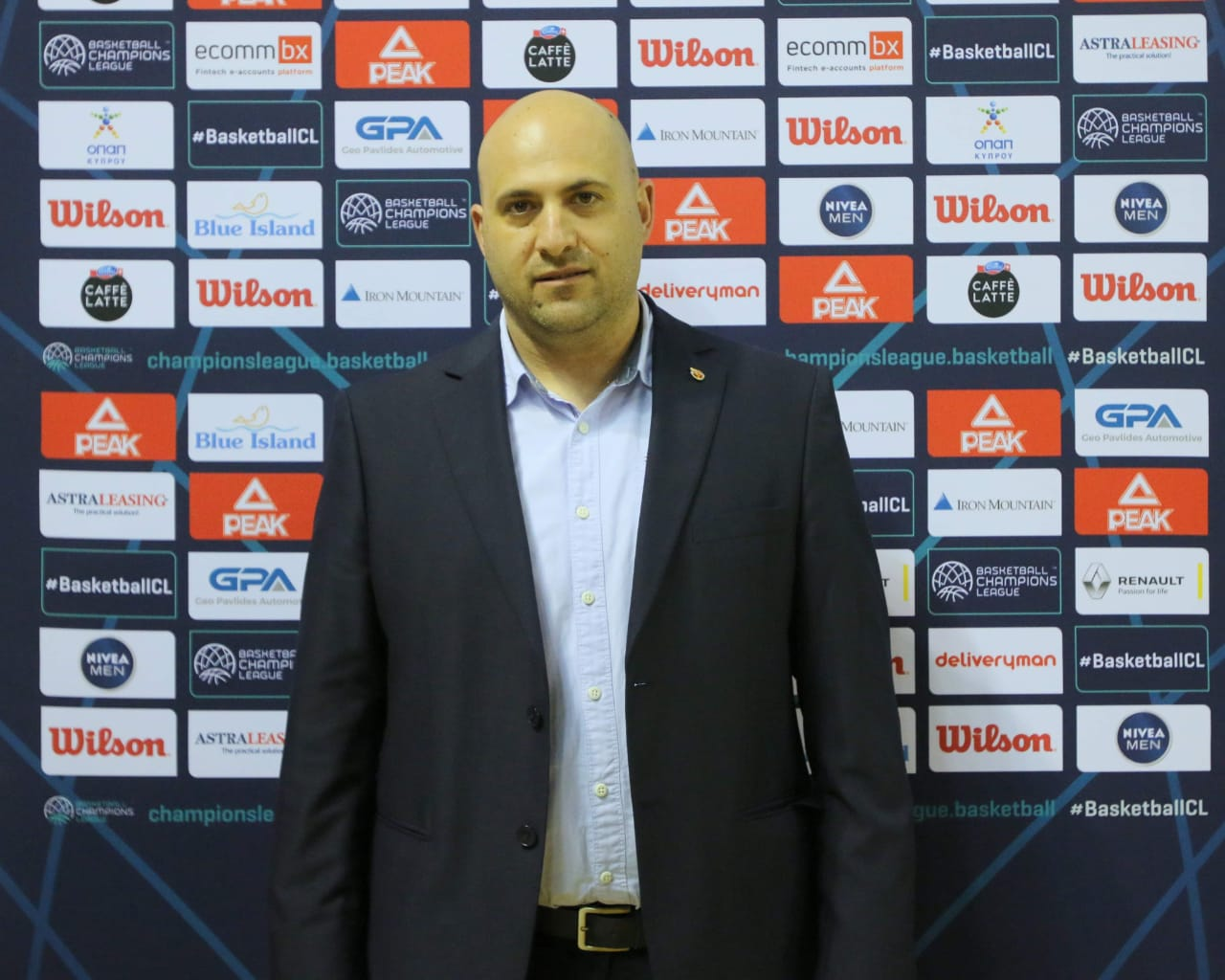
- Matsentides in 2020

Sagesse SC
- Position: Assistant coach
- League: Lebanese Basketball League West Asia Super League

Personal information
- Born: April 11, 1980 (age 46) Nicosia, Cyprus

Career history

Coaching
- 2007-2008: ENAD BC women's team
- 2008–2009: ENAD BC (assistant)
- 2009–2010: ETHA (assistant)
- 2010–2011: APOEL (assistant)
- 2012–2017: Cyprus (assistant women's team)
- 2013–2014: Cyprus U18W (assistant)
- 2014–2015: Cyprus U18W Head Coach
- 2015–2016: Cyprus U16W Head Coach
- 2016-2017: Cyprus U18W Head Coach
- 2017–2022: Cyprus U16B head Coach
- 2019–present: Cyprus Men’s (assistant)
- 2011–2019: Keravnos (assistant)
- 2019–2020: Al Riyadi Beirut (assistant)
- 2020-2021: Keravnos (assistant)
- 2021-2022: Keravnos Head Coach
- 2022-2023: Omonia Nicosia Head Coach
- 2023-2025: Kuwait SC (basketball) (assistant)
- 2025-: Sagesse SC (basketball) (assistant)

Michael Matsentides (Greek: Μιχάλης Ματσεντίδης; April 11, 1980) is a Greek-Cypriot professional basketball coach and current Assistant Coach of Sagesse SC (basketball) and Assistant Coach of Cyprus men's national basketball team

== Club coaching career ==
After having previously worked as the assistant coach of ENAD BC, ETHA and APOEL, Matsentides became the assistant coach of Keravnos in 2011 where he won 3 super cups, 2 cups and 3 championships.

In 2019, he was hired by the Al Riyadi Beirut as an assistant coach.

In 2020 he returned to the Keravnos as an assistant coach, in 2021 he became a head coach

In 2022 he is the head coach at Omonia Nicosia

In 2023 he was selected to be the assistant coach at the Kuwait SC where he stayed for two years winning two championships, one Cup and a Wasl Gulf region.

From August 2025 he is the Assistant coach of Sagesse SC (basketball) He won the Challenge Cup in Lebanon and finished second in the Arab Championship (2025) and in the Lebanese League, reaching the finals and taking the series to a Game 7.

== Cypriot national team ==
Matsentides has also worked as an assistant coach of the senior Cyprus women's team between 2012 and 2017 and between 2012 and 2017 he was head coach of Cyprus youth national teams, Since 2017 until 2021, Matsentides is the head coach of Cyprus U16 Boys team and in 2019 he was named assistant coach of Cyprus men's team.

In the summer of 2025, he participated with the men's national team in Cyprus' first and historic appearance in the final phase of the EuroBasket.
