= EuroBasket 2011 squads =

This article displays the squads of the teams that will participate at the EuroBasket 2011. Each team consists of 12 players.

Age and club as of the start of the tournament, 31 August 2011.

== Group A ==
=== Great Britain ===
Great Britain men's national basketball team roster
Players
Coaches

Pos.	No.	Name	Age – Date of birth	Height	Club	Ctr.
PG	4	Ogo Adegboye	23 – 23 September 1987	1.82 m (6 ft 0 in)	St. Bonaventure University	(United States)
PG	5	Andrew Lawrence	21 – 4 June 1990	1.88 m (6 ft 2 in)	College of Charleston	(United States)
G	6	Mike Lenzly	30 – 1 May 1981	1.85 m (6 ft 1 in)	CEZ Nymburk	(Czech Republic)
PG	7	Devon van Oostrum	18 – 24 January 1993	1.89 m (6 ft 2 in)	Saski Baskonia	(Spain)
F	8	Andrew Sullivan	31 – 12 February 1980	2.03 m (6 ft 8 in)	Mersey Tigers	(United Kingdom)
SF	9	Luol Deng	26 – 16 April 1985	2.06 m (6 ft 9 in)	Chicago Bulls	(United States)
C	10	Robert Archibald	31 – 29 March 1980	2.11 m (6 ft 11 in)	CAI Zaragoza	(Spain)
PF	11	Joel Freeland	24 – 7 February 1987	2.08 m (6 ft 10 in)	Baloncesto Málaga	(Spain)
G	12	Nate Reinking	37 – 12 December 1973	1.83 m (6 ft 0 in)	Mersey Tigers	(United Kingdom)
PF	13	Daniel Clark	22 – 16 September 1988	2.08 m (6 ft 10 in)	CB Estudiantes	(Spain)
C	14	Eric Boateng	25 – 20 November 1985	2.08 m (6 ft 10 in)	Austin Toros	(United States)
SG	15	Kyle Johnson	22 – 31 December 1988	1.93 m (6 ft 4 in)	Long Island University	(United States)

Head coach

- (United States) Chris Finch

Assistant coaches

- (United States) Paul Mokeski
- (United States) Nick Nurse

Legend

- (C) Team captain
- Club – describes last
  club before the tournament
- Age – describes age
  on 31 August 2011

=== Lithuania ===
Lithuania men's national basketball team roster
Players
Coaches

Pos.	No.	Name	Age – Date of birth	Height	Club	Ctr.
G	4	Rimantas Kaukėnas	34 – 11 April 1977	1.94 m (6 ft 4 in)	Montepaschi Siena	(Italy)
PG	5	Mantas Kalnietis	24 – 6 September 1986	1.96 m (6 ft 5 in)	BC Žalgiris	(Lithuania)
G	6	Tomas Delininkaitis	30 – 11 July 1981	1.90 m (6 ft 3 in)	BC Žalgiris	(Lithuania)
G/F	7	Martynas Pocius	25 – 28 April 1986	1.96 m (6 ft 5 in)	Real Madrid	(Spain)
F	8	Paulius Jankūnas	27 – 29 April 1984	2.06 m (6 ft 9 in)	BC Žalgiris	(Lithuania)
F/C	9	Darius Songaila	33 – 14 February 1978	2.06 m (6 ft 9 in)	Galatasaray Café Crown	(Turkey)
SF	10	Simas Jasaitis	29 – 26 March 1982	2.01 m (6 ft 7 in)	Türk Telekom B.K.	(Turkey)
C	11	Jonas Valančiūnas	19 – 6 May 1992	2.13 m (7 ft 0 in)	BC Lietuvos rytas	(Lithuania)
F/C	12	Kšyštof Lavrinovič	31 – 1 November 1979	2.10 m (6 ft 11 in)	Montepaschi Siena	(Italy)
PG	13	Šarūnas Jasikevičius	35 – 5 March 1976	1.93 m (6 ft 4 in)	Fenerbahçe Ülker	(Turkey)
C	14	Marijonas Petravičius	31 – 24 October 1979	2.09 m (6 ft 10 in)	Beşiktaş Cola Turka	(Turkey)
C	15	Robertas Javtokas (C)	31 – 20 March 1980	2.11 m (6 ft 11 in)	BC Žalgiris	(Lithuania)

Head coach

- (Lithuania) Kęstutis Kemzūra

Assistant coaches

- (Lithuania) Robertas Kuncaitis
- (Lithuania) Donaldas Kairys

Athletic trainer

- (Lithuania) Evaldas Kandratavičius

Legend

- (C) Team captain
- Club – describes last
  club before the tournament
- Age – describes age
  on 31 August 2011

=== Poland ===
Poland men's national basketball team roster
Players
Coaches

Pos.	No.	Name	Age – Date of birth	Height	Club	Ctr.
SG	4	Dardan Berisha	22 – 15 November 1988	1.93 m (6 ft 4 in)	Anwil Włocławek	(Poland)
C	5	Adam Łapeta	23 – 9 November 1987	2.15 m (7 ft 1 in)	Asseco Prokom Gdynia	(Poland)
PG	6	Robert Skibniewski	28 – 19 July 1983	1.83 m (6 ft 0 in)	SKS Starogard Gdański	(Poland)
G	7	Adam Waczyński	21 – 15 October 1989	1.99 m (6 ft 6 in)	Trefl Sopot	(Poland)
G	8	Piotr Pamuła	21 – 19 January 1990	1.94 m (6 ft 4 in)	AZS Politechnika Warszawa	(Poland)
PF	9	Paweł Leończyk	24 – 5 October 1986	2.03 m (6 ft 8 in)	Czarni Słupsk	(Poland)
C	10	Szymon Szewczyk	28 – 21 December 1982	2.09 m (6 ft 10 in)	S.S. Felice Scandone	(Italy)
G/F	11	Thomas Kelati	28 – 27 September 1982	1.94 m (6 ft 4 in)	BC Khimki	(Russia)
F	12	Piotr Szczotka	30 – 17 June 1981	2.00 m (6 ft 7 in)	Asseco Prokom Gdynia	(Poland)
G	13	Łukasz Wiśniewski	26 – 7 December 1984	1.86 m (6 ft 1 in)	Trefl Sopot	(Poland)
PF	14	Adam Hrycaniuk	27 – 15 March 1984	2.06 m (6 ft 9 in)	Asseco Prokom Gdynia	(Poland)
PG	15	Łukasz Koszarek	27 – 12 January 1984	1.87 m (6 ft 2 in)	Juvecaserta Basket	(Italy)

Head coach

- (Slovenia) Aleš Pipan

Legend

- (C) Team captain
- Club – describes last
  club before the tournament
- Age – describes age
  on 31 August 2011

=== Portugal ===
Portugal men's national basketball team roster
Players
Coaches

Pos.	No.	Name	Age – Date of birth	Height	Club	Ctr.
G	4	António Tavares	35 – 10 December 1975	1.84 m (6 ft 0 in)	S.L. Benfica	(Portugal)
PG	5	José Costa	37 – 8 December 1973	1.88 m (6 ft 2 in)	F.C. Porto	(Portugal)
G	6	Miguel Minhava	27 – 5 November 1983	1.98 m (6 ft 6 in)	S.L. Benfica	(Portugal)
PF	7	Fernando Sousa	29 – 7 December 1981	1.92 m (6 ft 4 in)	Coimbra Academic Association	(Portugal)
C	8	Cláudio Fonseca	22 – 22 January 1989	2.06 m (6 ft 9 in)	Vitória S.C.	(Portugal)
PG	9	Filipe da Silva	31 – 30 November 1979	1.93 m (6 ft 4 in)	CAB Madeira	(Portugal)
SF	10	Carlos Andrade	33 – 27 April 1978	1.98 m (6 ft 6 in)	F.C. Porto	(Portugal)
SF	11	José Silva	22 – 16 April 1989	1.94 m (6 ft 4 in)	Barreirense Basket	(Portugal)
C	12	Elvis Évora	33 – 4 February 1978	2.05 m (6 ft 9 in)	S.L. Benfica	(Portugal)
C	13	Marco Goncalves	27 – 22 April 1984	2.06 m (6 ft 9 in)	Ginasio	(Portugal)
C	14	Miguel Miranda	32 – 9 October 1978	2.05 m (6 ft 9 in)	F.C. Porto	(Portugal)
PF	15	Joao Santos	32 – 15 June 1979	2.04 m (6 ft 8 in)	S.L. Benfica	(Portugal)

Head coach

- (Portugal) Mario Palma

Legend

- (C) Team captain
- Club – describes last
  club before the tournament
- Age – describes age
  on 31 August 2011

=== Spain ===
Spain men's national basketball team roster
Players
Coaches

Pos.	No.	Name	Age – Date of birth	Height	Club	Ctr.
C	4	Pau Gasol	31 – 6 July 1980	2.13 m (7 ft 0 in)	Los Angeles Lakers	(United States)
SF	5	Rudy Fernández	26 – 4 April 1985	1.98 m (6 ft 6 in)	Dallas Mavericks	(United States)
PG	6	Ricky Rubio	20 – 21 October 1990	1.92 m (6 ft 4 in)	Minnesota Timberwolves	(United States)
SG	7	Juan Carlos Navarro (C)	31 – 13 June 1980	1.92 m (6 ft 4 in)	FC Barcelona Bàsquet	(Spain)
PG	8	José Manuel Calderón	29 – 28 September 1981	1.91 m (6 ft 3 in)	Toronto Raptors	(Canada)
PF	9	Felipe Reyes	31 – 16 March 1980	2.06 m (6 ft 9 in)	Real Madrid Baloncesto	(Spain)
PF	10	Víctor Claver	23 – 30 August 1988	2.07 m (6 ft 9 in)	Valencia BC	(Spain)
SG	11	Fernando San Emeterio	27 – 1 January 1984	1.99 m (6 ft 6 in)	Caja Laboral Baskonia	(Spain)
PG	12	Sergio Llull	23 – 15 November 1987	1.92 m (6 ft 4 in)	Real Madrid Baloncesto	(Spain)
C	13	Marc Gasol	26 – 29 January 1985	2.16 m (7 ft 1 in)	Memphis Grizzlies	(United States)
C	14	Serge Ibaka	22 – 18 July 1989	2.08 m (6 ft 10 in)	Oklahoma City Thunder	(United States)
PG	15	Victor Sada	27 – 8 March 1984	1.92 m (6 ft 4 in)	FC Barcelona Bàsquet	(Spain)

Head coach

- (Italy) Sergio Scariolo

Assistant coaches

- (Spain) Juan Antonio Orenga
- (Spain) Quim Costa

Trainers

- (Spain) José 'Pepiño' Casal
- (Spain) Ignacio 'Nacho' Coque

Legend

- (C) Team captain
- Club – describes last
  club before the tournament
- Age – describes age
  on 31 August 2011

=== Turkey ===
Turkey men's national basketball team roster
Players
Coaches

Pos.	No.	Name	Age – Date of birth	Height	Club	Ctr.
SF	4	Cenk Akyol	24 – 16 April 1987	2.00 m (6 ft 7 in)	Anadolu Efes S.K.	(Turkey)
SG	5	Sinan Güler	27 – 8 November 1983	1.96 m (6 ft 5 in)	Anadolu Efes S.K.	(Turkey)
SF	6	Emir Preldžič	23 – 6 September 1987	2.06 m (6 ft 9 in)	Fenerbahçe Ülker	(Turkey)
SG	7	Ömer Onan	33 – 4 February 1978	1.94 m (6 ft 4 in)	Fenerbahçe Ülker	(Turkey)
PF	8	Ersan İlyasova	24 – 15 May 1987	2.08 m (6 ft 10 in)	Anadolu Efes S.K.	(Turkey)
PF	9	İzzet Türkyılmaz	21 – 20 May 1990	2.10 m (6 ft 11 in)	Bandırma Banvit	(Turkey)
PG	10	Kerem Tunçeri	32 – 14 April 1979	1.91 m (6 ft 3 in)	Anadolu Efes S.K.	(Turkey)
C	11	Oğuz Savaş	24 – 13 July 1987	2.13 m (7 ft 0 in)	Fenerbahçe Ülker	(Turkey)
C	12	Ömer Aşık	25 – 4 July 1986	2.13 m (7 ft 0 in)	Chicago Bulls	(United States)
PG	13	Ender Arslan	28 – 13 January 1983	1.90 m (6 ft 3 in)	Galatasaray Cafe Crown	(Turkey)
F/C	14	Enes Kanter	19 – 20 May 1992	2.11 m (6 ft 11 in)	Utah Jazz	(United States)
SF	15	Hidayet Türkoğlu (C)	32 – 19 March 1979	2.08 m (6 ft 10 in)	Orlando Magic	(United States)

Head coach

- (Turkey) Orhun Ene

Assistant coaches

- (Bosnia and Herzegovina) Nihat Izić
- (Turkey) Alaeddin Yakan

Legend

- (C) Team captain
- Club – describes last
  club before the tournament
- Age – describes age
  on 31 August 2011

== Group B ==
=== France ===
France men's national basketball team roster
Players
Coaches

Pos.	No.	Name	Age – Date of birth	Height	Club	Ctr.
C	4	Joakim Noah	26 – 25 February 1985	2.11 m (6 ft 11 in)	Chicago Bulls	(United States)
G/F	5	Nicolas Batum	22 – 14 December 1988	2.03 m (6 ft 8 in)	Portland Trail Blazers	(United States)
C	6	Kevin Séraphin	21 – 7 December 1989	2.06 m (6 ft 9 in)	Washington Wizards	(United States)
PG	7	Andrew Albicy	21 – 21 March 1990	1.78 m (5 ft 10 in)	Paris-Levallois Basket	(France)
F	8	Charles Kahudi	25 – 19 July 1986	1.97 m (6 ft 6 in)	Le Mans Sarthe Basket	(France)
PG	9	Tony Parker	29 – 17 May 1982	1.88 m (6 ft 2 in)	San Antonio Spurs	(United States)
F/C	10	Ali Traoré	26 – 28 February 1985	2.05 m (6 ft 9 in)	Virtus Roma	(Italy)
F	11	Florent Piétrus	30 – 19 January 1981	2.02 m (6 ft 8 in)	Valencia BC	(Spain)
G	12	Nando de Colo	24 – 23 June 1987	1.96 m (6 ft 5 in)	Valencia BC	(Spain)
F	13	Boris Diaw (C)	29 – 16 April 1982	2.03 m (6 ft 8 in)	Charlotte Bobcats	(United States)
G	14	Steed Tchicamboud	30 – 18 June 1981	1.93 m (6 ft 4 in)	ÉS Chalon-sur-Saône	(France)
SF	15	Mickaël Gelabale	28 – 22 May 1983	2.00 m (6 ft 7 in)	ASVEL Basket	(France)

Head coach

- (France) Vincent Collet

Assistant coaches

- (France) Ruddy Nelhomme
- (France) Jacques Commeres

Legend

- (C) Team captain
- Club – describes last
  club before the tournament
- Age – describes age
  on 31 August 2011

=== Germany ===
Germany men's national basketball team roster
Players
Coaches

Pos.	No.	Name	Age – Date of birth	Height	Club	Ctr.
SF	4	Robin Benzing	22 – 25 January 1989	2.08 m (6 ft 10 in)	Ratiopharm Ulm	(Germany)
G	5	Johannes Herber	28 – 17 January 1983	1.97 m (6 ft 6 in)	Skyliners Frankfurt	(Germany)
PG	6	Steffen Hamann	30 – 14 June 1981	1.94 m (6 ft 4 in)	Bayern Munich	(Germany)
F	7	Sven Schultze	33 – 11 July 1978	2.06 m (6 ft 9 in)	Alba Berlin	(Germany)
PG	8	Heiko Schaffartzik	27 – 3 January 1984	1.83 m (6 ft 0 in)	Alba Berlin	(Germany)
C	9	Tim Ohlbrecht	23 – 30 August 1988	2.10 m (6 ft 11 in)	Telekom Baskets Bonn	(Germany)
G/F	10	Philipp Schwethelm	22 – 1 May 1989	2.01 m (6 ft 7 in)	Bayern Munich	(Germany)
C	11	Tibor Pleiß	21 – 2 November 1989	2.15 m (7 ft 1 in)	Brose Baskets	(Germany)
C	12	Chris Kaman	29 – 28 April 1982	2.13 m (7 ft 0 in)	Los Angeles Clippers	(United States)
SG	13	Lucca Staiger	23 – 14 June 1988	1.95 m (6 ft 5 in)	Alba Berlin	(Germany)
PF	14	Dirk Nowitzki	33 – 19 June 1978	2.13 m (7 ft 0 in)	Dallas Mavericks	(United States)
PF	15	Jan-Hendrik Jagla	30 – 25 June 1981	2.13 m (7 ft 0 in)	Bayern Munich	(Germany)

Head coach

- (Germany) Dirk Bauermann

Assistant coaches

- (Germany) Hans-Jürgen Gnad
- (Germany) Volker Stix

Legend

- (C) Team captain
- Club – describes last
  club before the tournament
- Age – describes age
  on 31 August 2011

=== Israel ===
Israel men's national basketball team roster
Players
Coaches

Pos.	No.	Name	Age – Date of birth	Height	Club	Ctr.
PG	4	Yogev Ohayon	24 – 24 April 1987	1.87 m (6 ft 2 in)	Hapoel Jerusalem	(Israel)
PG	5	Afik Nissim	30 – 31 January 1981	1.86 m (6 ft 1 in)	ČEZ Nymburk	(Czech Republic)
PG	6	Yuval Naimi	26 – 31 August 1985	1.87 m (6 ft 2 in)	Hapoel Jerusalem	(Israel)
SF	7	David Blu	31 – 18 July 1980	2.01 m (6 ft 7 in)	Maccabi Tel Aviv	(Israel)
SF	8	Guy Pnini	27 – 4 September 1983	2.01 m (6 ft 7 in)	Maccabi Tel Aviv	(Israel)
PF	9	Gal Mekel	23 – 4 March 1988	1.90 m (6 ft 3 in)	Pallacanestro Treviso	(Italy)
SG	10	Tal Burstein (C)	31 – 19 February 1980	1.98 m (6 ft 6 in)	Maccabi Tel Aviv	(Israel)
PF	11	Lior Eliyahu	25 – 9 September 1985	2.07 m (6 ft 9 in)	Maccabi Tel Aviv	(Israel)
SG	12	Yotam Halperin	27 – 24 January 1984	1.96 m (6 ft 5 in)	Olympiacos	(Greece)
PF	13	Elishay Kadir	23 – 4 November 1987	2.03 m (6 ft 8 in)	Maccabi Haifa	(Israel)
C	14	Yaniv Green	31 – 16 May 1980	2.06 m (6 ft 9 in)	Maccabi Tel Aviv	(Israel)
PF	15	Uri Kukia	30 – 14 May 1981	2.02 m (6 ft 8 in)	Hapoel Jerusalem	(Israel)

Head coach

- (Israel) Arik Shivek

Assistants coach

- (Israel) Oded Kattash
- (Israel) Dan Shamir

Legend

- (C) Team captain
- Club – describes last
  club before the tournament
- Age – describes age
  on 31 August 2011

=== Italy ===
Italy men's national basketball team roster
Players
Coaches

Pos.	No.	Name	Age – Date of birth	Height	Club	Ctr.
PG	4	Antonio Maestranzi	26 – 1 July 1984	5 ft 10 in (1.78 m)	Sutor Basket Montegranaro	(Italy)
G/F	5	Marco Carraretto	33 – 27 October 1977	6 ft 4 in (1.93 m)	Mens Sana Basket	(Italy)
F	6	Stefano Mancinelli	27 – 17 March 1983	6 ft 8 in (2.03 m)	Olimpia Milano	(Italy)
F/C	7	Andrea Bargnani	25 – 26 October 1985	7 ft 0 in (2.13 m)	Toronto Raptors	(Canada)
F	8	Danilo Gallinari	22 – 8 August 1988	6 ft 10 in (2.08 m)	Denver Nuggets	(United States)
G	9	Marco Mordente (C)	31 – 7 January 1979	6 ft 4 in (1.93 m)	Olimpia Milano	(Italy)
PG	10	Andrea Cinciarini	24 – 10 January 1986	6 ft 2.8 in (1.9 m)	Sutor Montegranaro	(Italy)
G	11	Marco Belinelli	24 – 25 March 1986	6 ft 5 in (1.96 m)	New Orleans Hornets	(United States)
C	12	Marco Cusin	23 – 18 June 1987	6 ft 11 in (2.11 m)	Victoria Libertas Pesaro	(Italy)
F	13	Luigi Datome	23 – 27 November 1987	6 ft 8 in (2.03 m)	Pallacanestro Virtus Roma	(Italy)
F/C	14	Andrea Renzi	21 – 18 August 1989	6 ft 9.9 in (2.08 m)	Scaligera Verona	(Italy)
PG	15	Daniel Hackett	22 – 19 December 1987	6 ft 6.35 in (1.99 m)	Victoria Libertas Pesaro	(Italy)

Head coach

- (Italy) Simone Pianigiani

Assistant coaches

- (Italy) Luca Delmonte
- (Italy) Andrea Capobianco

Legend

- (C) Team captain
- Club – describes last
  club before the tournament
- Age – describes age
  on 31 August 2011

=== Latvia ===
Latvia men's national basketball team roster
Players
Coaches

Pos.	No.	Name	Age – Date of birth	Height	Club	Ctr.
C	4	Mārtiņš Meiers	20 – 30 March 1991	2.06 m (6 ft 9 in)	BK Liepājas Lauvas	(Latvia)
SG	5	Dairis Bertāns	21 – 9 September 1989	1.92 m (6 ft 4 in)	BK VEF Rīga	(Latvia)
PF	6	Rolands Freimanis	23 – 21 January 1988	2.10 m (6 ft 11 in)	San Sebastián Gipuzkoa BC	(Spain)
SG	7	Jānis Blūms	29 – 20 April 1982	1.88 m (6 ft 2 in)	Bilbao Basket	(Spain)
SG	8	Mareks Jurevičus	26 – 17 January 1985	1.98 m (6 ft 6 in)	Tezenis Verona	(Italy)
PG	9	Edgars Jeromanovs	25 – 18 April 1986	1.90 m (6 ft 3 in)	Arhelaos	(Greece)
SF	10	Rihards Kuksiks	23 – 17 July 1988	2.01 m (6 ft 7 in)	Arizona State	(United States)
SF	11	Mareks Mejeris	19 – 2 September 1991	2.07 m (6 ft 9 in)	BK Liepājas Lauvas	(Latvia)
F	12	Dāvis Bertāns	18 – 12 November 1992	2.05 m (6 ft 9 in)	KK Olimpija	(Slovenia)
PG	13	Jānis Strēlnieks	21 – 1 September 1989	1.91 m (6 ft 3 in)	BK Ventspils	(Latvia)
PF	14	Artūrs Bērziņš	23 – 12 June 1988	2.04 m (6 ft 8 in)	BK Ventspils	(Latvia)
C	15	Andrejs Šeļakovs	22 – 8 November 1988	2.07 m (6 ft 9 in)	BK VEF Rīga	(Latvia)

Head coach

- (Latvia) Ainārs Bagatskis

Legend

- (C) Team captain
- Club – describes last
  club before the tournament
- Age – describes age
  on 31 August 2011

=== Serbia ===
Serbia men's national basketball team roster
Players
Coaches

Pos.	No.	Name	Age – Date of birth	Height	Club	Ctr.
G	4	Miloš Teodosić	24 – 19 March 1987	1.96 m (6 ft 5 in)	PBC CSKA Moscow	(Russia)
G/F	5	Milenko Tepić	24 – 27 February 1987	2.02 m (6 ft 8 in)	Panathinaikos BC	(Greece)
G	6	Aleksandar Rašić	27 – 16 March 1984	1.95 m (6 ft 5 in)	BC Lietuvos Rytas	(Lithuania)
SG	7	Ivan Paunić	24 – 27 January 1987	1.95 m (6 ft 5 in)	BC Nizhny Novgorod	(Russia)
SF	8	Nemanja Bjelica	23 – 9 May 1988	2.09 m (6 ft 10 in)	Saski Baskonia	(Spain)
PG	9	Stefan Marković	23 – 25 April 1988	1.99 m (6 ft 6 in)	Valencia BC	(Spain)
PF	10	Duško Savanović	27 – 5 September 1983	2.04 m (6 ft 8 in)	Efes Pilsen S.K.	(Turkey)
SF	11	Marko Kešelj	23 – 2 January 1988	2.05 m (6 ft 9 in)	Olympiacos BC	(Greece)
C	12	Nenad Krstić	28 – 25 July 1983	2.14 m (7 ft 0 in)	PBC CSKA Moscow	(Russia)
C	13	Kosta Perović	26 – 19 February 1985	2.18 m (7 ft 2 in)	FC Barcelona Bàsquet	(Spain)
C	14	Boban Marjanović	22 – 27 September 1988	2.21 m (7 ft 3 in)	BC Nizhny Novgorod	(Russia)
F/C	15	Milan Mačvan	21 – 16 November 1989	2.06 m (6 ft 9 in)	Maccabi Tel Aviv B.C.	(Israel)

Head coach

- (Serbia) Dušan Ivković

Assistant coaches

- (Serbia) Aleksandar Kesar
- (Serbia) Saša Nikitović
- (Serbia) Dušan Gvozdić

Legend

- (C) Team captain
- Club – describes last
  club before the tournament
- Age – describes age
  on 31 August 2011

== Group C ==
=== Bosnia and Herzegovina ===
Bosnia and Herzegovina men's national basketball team roster
Players
Coaches

Pos.	No.	Name	Age – Date of birth	Height	Club	Ctr.
PG	4	Nemanja Gordić	22 – 15 September 1988	1.92 m (6 ft 4 in)	Lottomatica Roma	(Italy)
G	5	Aleksej Nešović	26 – 14 March 1985	1.89 m (6 ft 2 in)	Budućnost Podgorica	(Montenegro)
C	6	Ermin Jazvin	31 – 12 March 1980	2.07 m (6 ft 9 in)	Czarni Słupsk	(Poland)
SG	7	Goran Ikonić	31 – 23 March 1980	1.96 m (6 ft 5 in)	Pınar Karşıyaka	(Turkey)
F	8	Milan Milošević	25 – 26 September 1985	2.00 m (6 ft 7 in)	Keravnos B.C.	(Cyprus)
PF	9	Edin Bavčić	27 – 5 June 1984	2.11 m (6 ft 11 in)	Triboldi Basket	(Italy)
PG	10	Saša Vasiljević	32 – 23 March 1979	1.84 m (6 ft 0 in)	BC Donetsk	(Ukraine)
C	11	Elmedin Kikanović	22 – 2 September 1988	2.13 m (7 ft 0 in)	Enisey Krasnoyarsk	(Russia)
F	12	Mirza Teletović	25 – 17 September 1985	2.06 m (6 ft 9 in)	Caja Laboral	(Spain)
SG	13	Henry Domercant	30 – 30 December 1980	1.93 m (6 ft 4 in)	UNICS Kazan	(Russia)
G	14	Nihad Đedović	21 – 12 January 1990	1.97 m (6 ft 6 in)	Lottomatica Roma	(Italy)
PF	15	Kenan Bajramović	30 – 21 May 1981	2.06 m (6 ft 9 in)	BC Lietuvos Rytas	(Lithuania)

Head coach

- (Bosnia and Herzegovina) Sabit Hadžić

Legend

- (C) Team captain
- Club – describes last
  club before the tournament
- Age – describes age
  on 31 August 2011

=== Croatia ===
Croatia men's national basketball team roster
Players
Coaches

Pos.	No.	Name	Age – Date of birth	Height	Club	Ctr.
C	4	Ante Tomić	24 – 17 February 1987	2.18 m (7 ft 2 in)	Real Madrid	(Spain)
PF	5	Lukša Andrić	26 – 29 May 1985	2.08 m (6 ft 10 in)	Galatasaray	(Turkey)
PG	6	Marko Popović	29 – 12 June 1982	1.85 m (6 ft 1 in)	Dinamo Sassari	(Italy)
SG	7	Bojan Bogdanović	22 – 18 April 1989	2.02 m (6 ft 8 in)	BC Žalgiris	(Lithuania)
PG	8	Rok Stipčević	25 – 25 May 1986	1.84 m (6 ft 0 in)	Pallacanestro Varese	(Italy)
SG	9	Marko Tomas	26 – 3 January 1985	2.01 m (6 ft 7 in)	Fenerbahçe Ülker	(Turkey)
PG	10	Dontaye Draper	27 – 10 August 1984	1.80 m (5 ft 11 in)	Cedevita Zagreb	(Croatia)
SG	11	Krunoslav Simon	26 – 24 June 1985	1.97 m (6 ft 6 in)	Zagreb	(Croatia)
PF	12	Damir Markota	25 – 26 December 1985	2.08 m (6 ft 10 in)	Union Olimpija	(Slovenia)
SF	13	Damjan Rudež	25 – 17 June 1986	2.08 m (6 ft 10 in)	Cibona Zagreb	(Croatia)
C	14	Luka Žorić	26 – 5 November 1984	2.11 m (6 ft 11 in)	CB Málaga	(Spain)
C	15	Stanko Barać	25 – 13 April 1986	2.17 m (7 ft 1 in)	Anadolu Efes	(Turkey)

Head coach

- (Croatia) Josip Vranković

Legend

- (C) Team captain
- Club – describes last
  club before the tournament
- Age – describes age
  on 31 August 2011

=== Finland ===
Finland men's national basketball team roster
Players
Coaches

Pos.	No.	Name	Age – Date of birth	Height	Club	Ctr.
G	4	Mikko Koivisto	24 – 18 April 1987	1.94 m (6 ft 4 in)	Loimaan Korikonkarit	(Finland)
C	5	Antti Nikkilä	33 – 25 August 1978	2.10 m (6 ft 11 in)	Tampereen Pyrintö (basketball)	(Finland)
PF	6	Kimmo Muurinen	30 – 23 February 1981	2.02 m (6 ft 8 in)	Skyliners Frankfurt	(Germany)
SF	7	Shawn Huff	27 – 5 May 1984	1.98 m (6 ft 6 in)	Fulgor Libertas Forlì	(Italy)
C	8	Gerald Lee	23 – 23 November 1987	2.08 m (6 ft 10 in)	Societa Veroli Basket	(Italy)
G	9	Sasu Salin	20 – 11 June 1991	1.90 m (6 ft 3 in)	KK Union Olimpija	(Slovenia)
PF	10	Tuukka Kotti	30 – 18 March 1981	2.05 m (6 ft 9 in)	Andrea Costa Imola	(Italy)
PG	11	Petteri Koponen	23 – 13 April 1988	1.94 m (6 ft 4 in)	Virtus Bologna	(Italy)
PF	12	Vesa Mäkäläinen	24 – 3 September 1986	2.00 m (6 ft 7 in)	Kauhajoen Karhu	(Finland)
PF	13	Hanno Möttölä	34 – 9 September 1976	2.09 m (6 ft 10 in)	Torpan Pojat	(Finland)
PG	14	Petri Virtanen	30 – 18 September 1980	1.83 m (6 ft 0 in)	Kataja Basket Club	(Finland)
PG	15	Teemu Rannikko	30 – 9 September 1980	1.89 m (6 ft 2 in)	Pallacanestro Varese	(Italy)

Head coach

- (Finland) Henrik Dettmann

Legend

- (C) Team captain
- Club – describes last
  club before the tournament
- Age – describes age
  on 31 August 2011

=== Greece ===
Greece men's national basketball team roster
Players
Coaches

Pos.	No.	Name	Age – Date of birth	Height	Club	Ctr.
PG	4	Vasilis Xanthopoulos	27 – 29 April 1984	1.88 m (6 ft 2 in)	Panathinaikos	(Greece)
C	5	Ioannis Bourousis	27 – 17 November 1983	2.15 m (7 ft 1 in)	Olimpia Milano	(Italy)
PG	6	Nikos Zisis	28 – 16 August 1983	1.97 m (6 ft 6 in)	Bilbao Basket	(Spain)
SF	7	Kostas Vasileiadis	27 – 15 March 1984	2.00 m (6 ft 7 in)	Bilbao Basket	(Spain)
PG	8	Nick Calathes	22 – 7 February 1989	1.98 m (6 ft 6 in)	Lokomotiv Kuban	(Russia)
PF	9	Antonis Fotsis (C)	30 – 1 April 1981	2.09 m (6 ft 10 in)	Olimpia Milano	(Italy)
SF	10	Kostas Papanikolaou	21 – 1 August 1990	2.04 m (6 ft 8 in)	Olympiacos	(Greece)
C	11	Dimitrios Mavroeidis	26 – 4 July 1985	2.12 m (6 ft 11 in)	Olympiacos	(Greece)
SG	12	Michael Bramos	24 – 27 May 1987	1.98 m (6 ft 6 in)	Panathinaikos	(Greece)
C	13	Kosta Koufos	22 – 24 February 1989	2.13 m (7 ft 0 in)	Denver Nuggets	(United States)
SG	14	Kostas Sloukas	21 – 15 January 1990	1.90 m (6 ft 3 in)	Olympiacos	(Greece)
PF	15	Kostas Kaimakoglou	28 – 15 March 1983	2.05 m (6 ft 9 in)	UNICS Kazan	(Russia)

Head coach

- (Greece) Ilias Zouros

Legend

- (C) Team captain
- Club – describes last
  club before the tournament
- Age – describes age
  on 31 August 2011

=== Macedonia ===
Macedonia men's national basketball team roster
Players
Coaches

Pos.	No.	Name	Age – Date of birth	Height	Club	Ctr.
PG	4	Dimitar Mirakovski	30 – 14 May 1981	1.78 m (5 ft 10 in)	KK Rabotnički	(North Macedonia)
PG	5	Vlado Ilievski	31 – 19 January 1980	1.88 m (6 ft 2 in)	KK Olimpija	(Slovenia)
G	6	Darko Sokolov	25 – 8 May 1986	1.90 m (6 ft 3 in)	KK Feni Industries	(North Macedonia)
PG	7	Bo McCalebb	26 – 4 May 1985	1.83 m (6 ft 0 in)	Montepaschi Siena	(Italy)
G/F	8	Vojdan Stojanovski	23 – 9 December 1987	1.94 m (6 ft 4 in)	KK Feni Industries	(North Macedonia)
G/F	9	Damjan Stojanovski	23 – 9 December 1987	1.97 m (6 ft 6 in)	PBC Lukoil Academic	(Bulgaria)
SG	10	Marko Simonovski	22 – 28 June 1989	1.92 m (6 ft 4 in)	KK Rabotnički	(North Macedonia)
C	11	Todor Gečevski	34 – 28 August 1977	2.11 m (6 ft 11 in)	PAOK B.C.	(Greece)
PF	12	Pero Antić (C)	29 – 29 July 1982	2.10 m (6 ft 11 in)	BC Spartak Saint Petersburg	(Russia)
SG	13	Ivica Dimcevski	22 – 27 June 1989	1.92 m (6 ft 4 in)	KK Torus	(North Macedonia)
PF	14	Gjorgji Čekovski	31 – 11 December 1979	2.02 m (6 ft 8 in)	BC Levski Sofia	(Bulgaria)
C	15	Predrag Samardžiski	25 – 11 April 1986	2.15 m (7 ft 1 in)	Eskişehir Basket	(Turkey)

Head coach

- (North Macedonia) Marin Dokuzovski

Legend

- (C) Team captain
- Club – describes last
  club before the tournament
- Age – describes age
  on 31 August 2011

=== Montenegro ===
Montenegro men's national basketball team roster
Players
Coaches

Pos.	No.	Name	Age – Date of birth	Height	Club	Ctr.
C	4	Nikola Vučević	20 – 24 October 1990	2.13 m (7 ft 0 in)	Budućnost Podgorica	(Montenegro)
SF	5	Goran Jeretin	31 – 17 September 1979	1.90 m (6 ft 3 in)	Lokomotiv Kuban	(Russia)
G	6	Boris Bakić	26 – 23 May 1985	1.93 m (6 ft 4 in)	Red Star Belgrade	(Serbia)
SG	7	Vlado Šćepanović	35 – 13 November 1975	1.96 m (6 ft 5 in)	Panellinios Basket	(Greece)
F	8	Miloš Borisov	25 – 3 September 1985	2.01 m (6 ft 7 in)	Teramo Basket	(Italy)
SG	9	Vladimir Mihailović	21 – 10 August 1990	1.94 m (6 ft 4 in)	Budućnost Podgorica	(Montenegro)
PG	10	Omar Cook	29 – 28 January 1982	1.86 m (6 ft 1 in)	Emporio Armani Milano	(Italy)
C	11	Slavko Vraneš	28 – 30 January 1983	2.30 m (7 ft 7 in)	UNICS Kazan	(Russia)
PF	12	Milko Bjelica	27 – 4 June 1984	2.05 m (6 ft 9 in)	Saski Baskonia	(Spain)
PF	13	Vladimir Dragičević	25 – 30 May 1986	2.05 m (6 ft 9 in)	Spartak St. Petersburg	(Russia)
C	14	Nikola Peković	25 – 3 January 1986	2.11 m (6 ft 11 in)	Partizan Belgrade	(Serbia)
F	15	Vladimir Dašić	23 – 13 May 1988	2.08 m (6 ft 10 in)	Lottomatica Roma	(Italy)

Head coach

- (Montenegro) Dejan Radonjić

Legend

- (C) Team captain
- Club – describes last
  club before the tournament
- Age – describes age
  on 31 August 2011

== Group D ==
=== Belgium ===
Belgium men's national basketball team roster
Players
Coaches

Pos.	No.	Name	Age – Date of birth	Height	Club	Ctr.
PG	4	Roel Moors	32 – 16 December 1978	1.90 m (6 ft 3 in)	Antwerp Giants	(Belgium)
PG	5	Sam Van Rossom	25 – 3 June 1986	1.88 m (6 ft 2 in)	CAI Zaragoza	(Spain)
PF	6	Christophe Beghin	31 – 2 January 1980	2.05 m (6 ft 9 in)	Spirou Charleroi	(Belgium)
SF	7	Randy Oveneke	25 – 3 January 1986	2.00 m (6 ft 7 in)	Antwerp Giants	(Belgium)
PG	8	Jorn Steinbach	22 – 20 January 1989	1.80 m (5 ft 11 in)	Okapi Aalstar	(Belgium)
SG	9	Jonathan Tabu	25 – 7 October 1985	1.90 m (6 ft 3 in)	Gruppo Triboldi Basket	(Italy)
SG	10	Dimitri Lauwers	32 – 30 April 1979	1.87 m (6 ft 2 in)	Air Avellino	(Italy)
SG	11	Guy Muya	28 – 23 May 1983	1.93 m (6 ft 4 in)	Belgacom Liège Basket	(Belgium)
SF	12	Marcus Faison	33 – 18 February 1978	1.96 m (6 ft 5 in)	Telenet Oostende	(Belgium)
C	13	Maxime De Zeeuw	24 – 27 April 1987	2.13 m (7 ft 0 in)	Verviers Pepinster	(Belgium)
C	14	Tomas Van Den Spiegel	33 – 10 July 1978	2.14 m (7 ft 0 in)	Telenet Oostende	(Belgium)
C	15	D. J. Mbenga	30 – 30 December 1980	2.13 m (7 ft 0 in)	New Orleans Hornets	(United States)

Head coach

- (Belgium) Eddy Casteels

Legend

- (C) Team captain
- Club – describes last
  club before the tournament
- Age – describes age
  on 31 August 2011

=== Bulgaria ===
Bulgaria men's national basketball team roster
Players
Coaches

Pos.	No.	Name	Age – Date of birth	Height	Club	Ctr.
PF	4	Dejan Ivanov	25 – 18 March 1986	2.05 m (6 ft 9 in)	Sutor Basket Montegranaro	(Italy)
PF	5	Kaloyan Ivanov	25 – 18 March 1986	2.05 m (6 ft 9 in)	Lucentum Alicante	(Spain)
PG	6	E. J. Rowland	28 – 18 May 1983	1.91 m (6 ft 3 in)	Unicaja Málaga	(Spain)
SG	7	Chavdar Kostov	23 – 18 April 1988	1.95 m (6 ft 5 in)	Kavala	(Greece)
SF	8	Filip Videnov	31 – 12 June 1980	1.97 m (6 ft 6 in)	Asseco Prokom Gdynia	(Poland)
SF	9	Pavel Marinov	23 – 12 June 1988	1.99 m (6 ft 6 in)	Lukoil Academic	(Bulgaria)
PG	10	Bozhidar Avramov	21 – 8 March 1990	1.95 m (6 ft 5 in)	Lukoil Academic	(Bulgaria)
SG	11	Zlatin Georgiev	26 – 22 May 1985	1.96 m (6 ft 5 in)	Levski Sofia	(Bulgaria)
PF	12	Aleksandar Yanev	21 – 20 January 1990	2.03 m (6 ft 8 in)	Euroins Cherno More	(Bulgaria)
PG	13	Asen Velikov	25 – 11 January 1986	1.85 m (6 ft 1 in)	Levski Sofia	(Bulgaria)
C	14	Tencho Banev	31 – 14 August 1980	2.07 m (6 ft 9 in)	Lukoil Academic	(Bulgaria)
C	15	Nikolay Varbanov	26 – 6 June 1985	2.10 m (6 ft 11 in)	BC Kalev/Cramo	(Estonia)

Head coach

- (Bulgaria) Rosen Barchovski

Legend

- (C) Team captain
- Club – describes last
  club before the tournament
- Age – describes age
  on 31 August 2011

=== Georgia ===
Georgia men's national basketball team roster
Players
Coaches

Pos.	No.	Name	Age – Date of birth	Height	Club	Ctr.
PG	4	Giorgi Gamqrelidze	25 – 4 February 1986	1.85 m (6 ft 1 in)	Mitteldeutscher BC	(Germany)
PF	5	Vladimir Boisa	30 – 4 July 1981	2.05 m (6 ft 9 in)	KK Union Olimpija	(Slovenia)
SF	6	Anatoli Boisa	27 – 9 September 1983	1.92 m (6 ft 4 in)	BC Dinamo Tbilisi	(Georgia (country))
C	7	Zaza Pachulia	27 – 10 February 1984	2.10 m (6 ft 11 in)	Atlanta Hawks	(United States)
PG	8	Giorgi Tsintsadze	25 – 7 February 1986	1.92 m (6 ft 4 in)	Tartu Ülikool/Rock	(Estonia)
C	9	Giorgi Shermadini	22 – 2 April 1989	2.16 m (7 ft 1 in)	KK Union Olimpija	(Slovenia)
SG	10	Lasha Parghalava	24 – 7 February 1987	1.90 m (6 ft 3 in)	BC Sokhumi	(Georgia (country))
SF	11	Manuchar Markoishvili	24 – 17 November 1986	1.96 m (6 ft 5 in)	Pallacanestro Cantù	(Italy)
G	12	Marquez Haynes	24 – 19 December 1986	1.88 m (6 ft 2 in)	CB Gran Canaria	(Spain)
SF	13	Viktor Sanikidze	25 – 1 April 1986	2.03 m (6 ft 8 in)	Virtus Bologna	(Italy)
PF	14	Tornike Shengelia	19 – 5 October 1991	2.07 m (6 ft 9 in)	Spirou Charleroi	(Belgium)
PF	15	Nikoloz Tskitishvili	28 – 14 April 1983	2.12 m (6 ft 11 in)	San Sebastián Gipuzkoa BC	(Spain)

Head coach

- (Serbia) Igor Kokoskov

Legend

- (C) Team captain
- Club – describes last
  club before the tournament
- Age – describes age
  on 31 August 2011

=== Russia ===
Russia men's national basketball team roster
Players
Coaches

Pos.	No.	Name	Age – Date of birth	Height	Club	Ctr.
PF	4	Andrey Vorontsevich	24 – 17 July 1987	2.07 m (6 ft 9 in)	PBC CSKA Moscow	(Russia)
C	5	Timofey Mozgov	25 – 16 July 1986	2.16 m (7 ft 1 in)	BC Khimki	(Russia)
PG	6	Sergey Bykov	28 – 26 February 1983	1.90 m (6 ft 3 in)	PBC CSKA Moscow	(Russia)
SG	7	Vitaly Fridzon	25 – 14 October 1985	1.95 m (6 ft 5 in)	BC Khimki	(Russia)
SG	8	Alexey Shved	22 – 16 December 1988	1.98 m (6 ft 6 in)	PBC CSKA Moscow	(Russia)
PF	9	Nikita Shabalkin	24 – 9 October 1986	2.06 m (6 ft 9 in)	BC Lokomotiv–Kuban Krasnodar	(Russia)
SF	10	Viktor Khryapa	29 – 3 August 1982	2.04 m (6 ft 8 in)	PBC CSKA Moscow	(Russia)
SF	11	Semen Antonov	22 – 18 July 1989	2.02 m (6 ft 8 in)	BC Nizhny Novgorod	(Russia)
SF	12	Sergey Monya	28 – 15 April 1983	2.02 m (6 ft 8 in)	BC Khimki	(Russia)
SG	13	Khvostov, Dmitri	22 – 21 August 1989	1.90 m (6 ft 3 in)	BC Khimki	(Russia)
PG	14	Anton Ponkrashov	25 – 23 April 1986	2.00 m (6 ft 7 in)	PBC CSKA Moscow	(Russia)
SF	15	Andrei Kirilenko	30 – 18 February 1981	2.06 m (6 ft 9 in)	Utah Jazz	(United States)

Head coach

- (Israel) David Blatt

Assistant coach

- (Russia) Dmitriy Shakulin
- (Russia) Sergey Zharmukhamedov

Legend

- (C) Team captain
- Club – describes last
  club before the tournament
- Age – describes age
  on 31 August 2011

=== Slovenia ===
Slovenia men's national basketball team roster
Players
Coaches

Pos.	No.	Name	Age – Date of birth	Height	Club	Ctr.
C	4	Uroš Slokar	28 – 14 May 1983	2.10 m (6 ft 11 in)	Lottomatica Roma	(Italy)
PG	5	Jaka Lakovič (C)	33 – 9 July 1978	1.86 m (6 ft 1 in)	Galatasaray	(Turkey)
PG	6	Luka Rupnik	18 – 20 May 1993	1.85 m (6 ft 1 in)	Geoplin Slovan	(Slovenia)
SG	7	Sašo Ožbolt	30 – 4 April 1981	1.91 m (6 ft 3 in)	Zagreb	(Croatia)
PF	8	Matjaž Smodiš	31 – 13 December 1979	2.05 m (6 ft 9 in)	Cedevita Zagreb	(Croatia)
SG	9	Samo Udrih	32 – 2 August 1979	1.95 m (6 ft 5 in)	Union Olimpija	(Slovenia)
SF	10	Edo Murić	19 – 27 November 1991	2.02 m (6 ft 8 in)	Krka Novo mesto	(Slovenia)
PG	11	Goran Dragić	25 – 6 May 1986	1.94 m (6 ft 4 in)	Houston Rockets	(United States)
SF	12	Goran Jagodnik	37 – 23 May 1974	2.02 m (6 ft 8 in)	Union Olimpija	(Slovenia)
SG	13	Zoran Dragić	22 – 22 June 1989	1.96 m (6 ft 5 in)	Krka Novo mesto	(Slovenia)
C	14	Mirza Begić	26 – 9 July 1985	2.16 m (7 ft 1 in)	Real Madrid	(Spain)
PF	15	Erazem Lorbek	27 – 22 February 1984	2.10 m (6 ft 11 in)	FC Barcelona	(Spain)

Head coach

- (Serbia) Božidar Maljković

Legend

- (C) Team captain
- Club – describes last
  club before the tournament
- Age – describes age
  on 31 August 2011

=== Ukraine ===
Ukraine men's national basketball team roster
Players
Coaches

Pos.	No.	Name	Age – Date of birth	Height	Club	Ctr.
SF	4	Maksym Pustozvonov	24 – 16 April 1987	2.00 m (6 ft 7 in)	BC Donetsk	(Ukraine)
PG	5	Denys Lukashov	22 – 30 April 1989	1.89 m (6 ft 2 in)	BC Kyiv	(Ukraine)
PG	6	Steve Burtt, Jr.	27 – 7 March 1984	1.89 m (6 ft 2 in)	BC Dnipro	(Ukraine)
SG	7	Oleksandr Kolchenko	22 – 20 September 1988	1.95 m (6 ft 5 in)	BC Donetsk	(Ukraine)
SG	8	Oleksandr Lypovyy	19 – 9 October 1991	2.00 m (6 ft 7 in)	BC Azovmash	(Ukraine)
PG	9	Dmytro Zabirchenko	27 – 15 June 1984	1.92 m (6 ft 4 in)	BC Donetsk	(Ukraine)
PF	10	Oleg Saltovets	34 – 3 July 1977	2.02 m (6 ft 8 in)	BC Donetsk	(Ukraine)
C	11	Oleksiy Pecherov	25 – 8 December 1985	2.13 m (7 ft 0 in)	BC Azovmash	(Ukraine)
C	12	Sergei Lishouk	29 – 31 March 1982	2.10 m (6 ft 11 in)	Valencia BC	(Spain)
SF	13	Danylo Kozlov	28 – 11 December 1982	2.04 m (6 ft 8 in)	BC Dnipro	(Ukraine)
C	14	Kyrylo Fesenko	24 – 24 December 1986	2.13 m (7 ft 0 in)	Utah Jazz	(United States)
C	15	Viacheslav Kravtsov	24 – 25 August 1987	2.12 m (6 ft 11 in)	BC Donetsk	(Ukraine)

Head coach

- (United States) Mike Fratello

Legend

- (C) Team captain
- Club – describes last
  club before the tournament
- Age – describes age
  on 31 August 2011
