= Pano Pavlidis =

Cypriot basketball player

No. 24 – Keravnos
- Position: Power forward / small forward
- League: Cypriot League

Personal information
- Born: 30 September 2000 (age 26) Queens, New York, U.S.
- Listed height: 6 ft 8 in (2.03 m)
- Listed weight: 212 lb (96 kg)

Career information
- High school: Benjamin N. Cardozo (Queens, New York)
- College: Molloy (2018–2022); Hartford (2022–2023); Stonehill (2023–2024)
- NBA draft: 2024: undrafted
- Playing career: 2024–present

Career history
- 2024–present: Keravnos

Career highlights
- Cypriot Cup winner (2025)

Pano Pavlidis (born September 30, 2000) is a Cypriot / Greek professional basketball player for Keravnos of the Cypriot League. He played college basketball for Molloy, Hartford and Stonehill, before turning pro in 2024. After 6 years of college basketball, Pavlidis entered the 2024 NBA draft but was not selected in the draft's two rounds.

== College career ==
Pavlidis played college basketball for Molloy Lions for four years. He then moved to Hartford for one year and to Stonehill the following year.

== Professional career ==
Pavlidis started his pro career in 2024 with Keravnos of the Cypriot League.
