= Nikolaos Stylianou =

Greekcypriot basketball player

No. 9 – Keravnos
- Position: Small forward
- League: Cypriot League

Personal information
- Born: 9 November 1988 (age 38) Athens, Greece
- Listed height: 6 ft 6 in (1.98 m)
- Listed weight: 187 lb (85 kg)

Career information
- College: Navarro (2006–2008); West Texas A&M (2008–2009)
- NBA draft: 2010: undrafted
- Playing career: 2010–present

Career history
- 2010–2011: Rethymno
- 2011–2012: AEK Larnaca
- 2012–2013: Kavala
- 2013–2014: Koroivos
- 2014–2015: OFI
- 2015–2017: Keravnos
- 2017–2018: Faros Larissas
- 2018: Dzūkija Alytus
- 2018–2019: Kymi
- 2019–present: Keravnos

Career highlights
- 4x Cypriot League champion (2017, 2019, 2022, 2024); 4x Cypriot Cup winner (2019, 2022, 2024, 2025); 5x Cypriot Super Cup winner (2019, 2021–2024); 3x Cypriot League All-Star (2015, 2022, 2023)

Nikolaos Stylianou (born November 9, 1988) is a Greekcypriot professional basketball player for Keravnos of the Cypriot League. He played college basketball for Navarro College and West Texas A&M. After 3 years of college basketball, Stylianou entered the 2010 NBA draft but was not selected in the draft's two rounds.

== College career ==
Stylianou played college basketball for Navarro College for two years. He then moved to West Texas A&M, where he played until 2009.

== Professional career ==
After playing with West Texas A&M, Stylianou entered the 2010 NBA draft but was not selected in the draft's two rounds. He started his pro career with Rethymno of the Greek A2 League. After one year, he returned to Cyprus and joined AEK Larnaca of the Cypriot Division A.

The following seasons, Stylianou returned to Greece and played for Kavala, Koroivos and OFI, before returning to Cyprus in order to join Keravnos. He won the Cypriot Championship with Keravnos in 2017.

After two years with Keravnos, Stylianou returned to Greece and joined the newly promoted to the Greek League Faros Larissas. He left Faros in order to join Alytus Dzūkija of the Lithuanian Basket League.

== National team career ==
Stylianou has been a member of the junior national teams of Cyprus for some years. He is currently one of the leaders and the captain of the Cyprus national team.
