= Simon Michail =

Cypriot basketball player

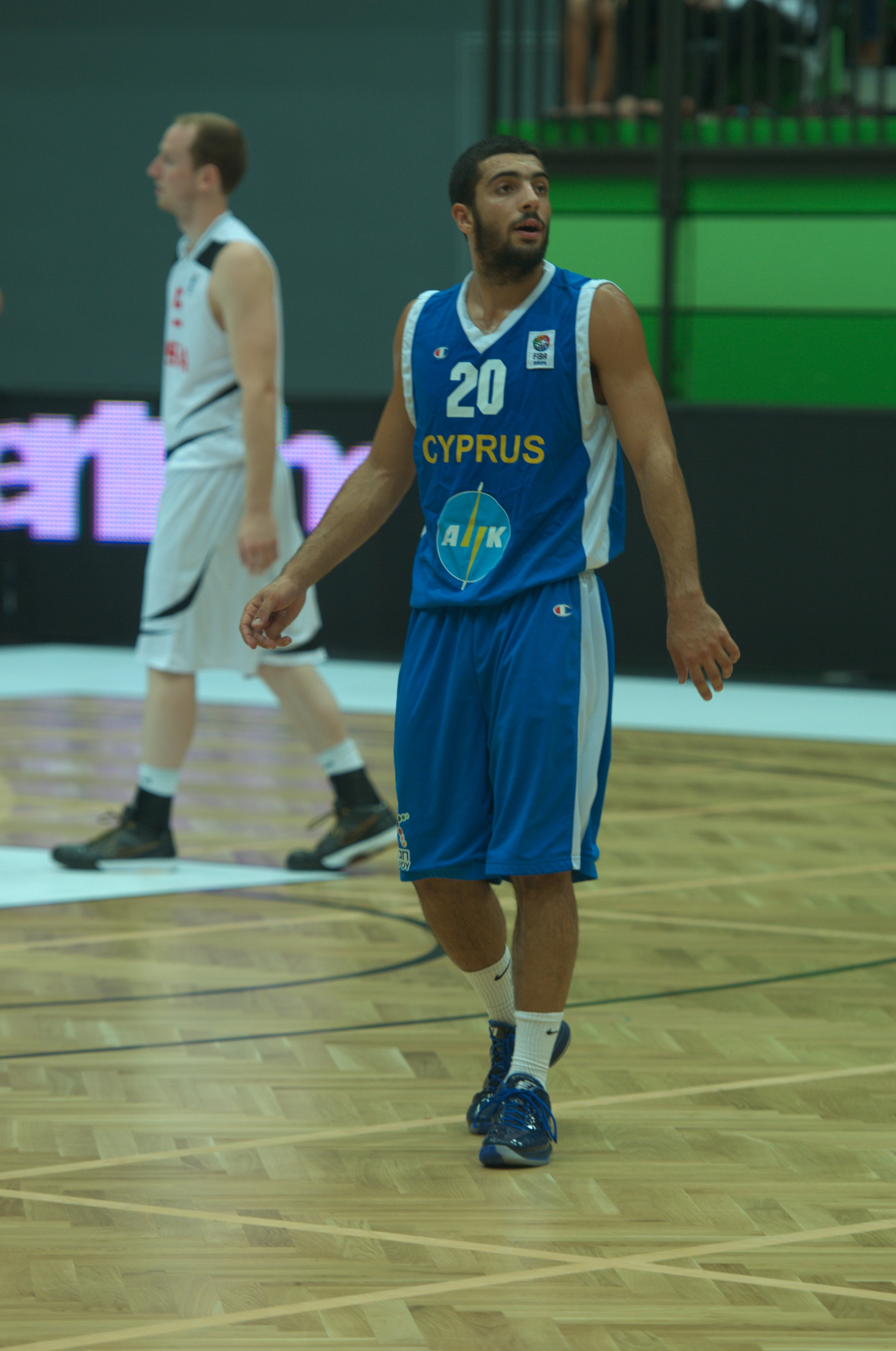
- Michail with the Cyprus national team

No. 5 – Keravnos
- Position: Point guard
- League: Cypriot League

Personal information
- Born: 19 June 1992 (age 34) London, England
- Listed height: 6 ft 1 in (1.85 m)

Career information
- NBA draft: 2014: undrafted
- Playing career: 2013–present

Career history
- 2013–2014: AEL Limassol
- 2014–present: Keravnos

Career highlights
- 4x Cypriot League champion (2017, 2019, 2022, 2024); 4x Cypriot Cup winner (2019, 2022, 2024, 2025); 4x Cypriot Super Cup winner (2019, 2021–2023); 7x Cypriot League All-Star (2014–2019, 2022)

Simon Michail (born 19 June 1992) is a Cypriot professional basketball player for Keravnos of the Cypriot League and the Cyprus national team. Michail entered the 2014 NBA draft, but was not selected in the draft's two rounds.

== Professional career ==
Michail began his career with AEL Limassol of the Cypriot League. After a really good year with the club, he joined Keravnos. On 19 May 2019, after already being at the club for five years, he extended his contract until 2024.

== National team career ==
Michail was a member of the Cyprus junior national teams, and is currently one of the leaders of the senior Cyprus national team, as well as captain.
