= Filippos Tigkas =

Cypriot basketball player (born 2002)

- Tigkas in 2026

No. 13 – Mykonos
- Position: Point guard
- League: Greek Basketball League

Personal information
- Born: 5 November 2002 (age 24) Cyprus
- Listed height: 6 ft 0 in (1.83 m)
- Listed weight: 176 lb (80 kg)

Career information
- Playing career: 2020–present

Career history
- 2020–2021: Apollon Limassol
- 2021–2026: Keravnos
- 2026–present: Mykonos

Career highlights
- 2x Cypriot League champion (2022, 2024); 3x Cypriot Cup winner (2022, 2024, 2025); 2x Cypriot Cup MVP (2024, 2025); 3x Cypriot Super Cup winner (2021–2023); 2x Cypriot League All-Star (2022, 2023)

Filippos Tigkas (born 5 November 2002) is a Cypriot-Greek professional basketball player who plays as a point guard for Greek League club Mykonos B.C. and the Cyprus national team.

== Early career ==
Tigkas started playing basketball with Apollon Limassol in Cyprus. At the age of 16, he was transferred to AEK Athens of the Greek League, where he played with the junior team of the club. He also took several practices with AEK Athens men's team.

== Professional career ==
On 7 July 2020, Tigkas returned to Cyprus and signed with Apollon Limassol of the Cypriot League. In his first professional season, Tigkas averaged 7.7 points and 2.7 assists with Apollon. In the summer of 2021, Keravnos Strovolou and AEK Larnaca battled in order to secure his signature. Tigkas decided to join Keravnos Strovolou in the end.

On 19 June 2026, Tigkas joined Mykonos of the Greek League.

== International career ==
Tigkas was eligible to represent both Greece and Cyprus internationally due to his dual Greek and Cypriot citizenship. After competing at youth level, he elected to represent Cyprus in international competition. At youth level, Tigkas represented Cyprus at the FIBA U16 European Championship Division B. He appeared in the 2017 and 2018 tournaments, averaging 7.8 points, 2.8 rebounds and 2.5 assists per game in 2017, and 14.4 points, 4.6 rebounds and 2.6 assists per game in 2018.

Tigkas made his senior national team debut for Cyprus during the 2023 FIBA Basketball World Cup European Pre-Qualifiers. He later became a regular member of the national team during the EuroBasket 2025 qualification campaign, averaging 10.5 points, 3.7 rebounds and 3.5 assists per game in six appearances. In the EuroBasket 2025, Cyprus' first appearance at the tournament as a host nation, Tigkas averaged 10.4 points, 2.8 rebounds and 3.6 assists per game in five contests. His best performance came against Italy, when he scored 15 points and added six rebounds and four assists. Tigkas also represented Cyprus during the 2027 FIBA Basketball World Cup European Qualifiers, averaging 11.7 points and 2.8 rebounds per game through the opening qualification window.
