= Ioannis Pasiali =

Cypriot basketball player (born 1997)

No. 4 – Keravnos
- Position: Power forward / small forward
- League: Cyprus Basketball Division 1

Personal information
- Born: 1 November 1997 (age 29) Cyprus
- Listed height: 6 ft 8 in (2.03 m)
- Listed weight: 190 lb (86 kg)

Career information
- Playing career: 2014–present

Career history
- 2014–2018: AEK Larnaca
- 2018–2020: AEL Limassol
- 2020: APOP Paphos
- 2020–present: Keravnos

Career highlights
- 4x Cypriot League champion (2015, 2016, 2022, 2024); 5x Cypriot Cup winner (2017, 2018, 2022, 2024, 2025); 3x Cypriot Super Cup winner (2021–2023); Cypriot League All-Star (2022)

Ioannis Pasiali (born November 1, 1997) is a Cypriot professional basketball player for Keravnos of the Cyprus Basketball Division 1.

== Professional career ==
Pasiali began his career with AEK Larnaca of the Cypriot League.During his tenure with the club, he won the Cypriot League and the Cypriot Cup two times each, being mostly a bench player. The following two seasons, he played with AEL Limassol.

On July 19, 2020, Pasiali joined APOP Paphos of the Cypriot League. After averaging 12.6 points and 4.8 rebounds with APOP, on December 14, 2020, was transferred to Keravnos of the Cyprus Basketball Division 1.

== Cyprus national team ==
Pasiali has been regularly called to Cypriot Senior National Team since 2019 and has taken part in several official games.
