= Keravnos B.C. =

Cypriot basketball club

Keravnos
- Leagues: Cyprus Basketball Division A Europe Cup
- Founded: 1926; 100 years ago
- History: Keravnos B.C. (1926–present)
- Arena: Costas Papaellinas Arena
- Capacity: 2,000
- Location: Strovolos, Nicosia, Cyprus
- Team colors: Maroon, Gold, White, Black
- President: Paris Papaellinas
- Vice-president: Andreas Kyprianou
- Head coach: Michalis Kakiouzis
- Championships: 9 Cypriot Championships; 13 Cypriot Cups
- Website: www.keravnosbc.com
Home	Away	Third

Keravnos B.C. (Greek: Γυμναστικός Σύλλογος Στροβόλου «Ο Κεραυνός»), also known as Keravnos Strovolou, is a professional basketball club based in Strovolos, Nicosia, Cyprus. It plays its home games in the Costas Papaellinas Arena, which has a capacity of 2,000 spectators.

The club's president since 1996 is businessman Paris C. Papaellinas, who has also been the main sponsor of the club for the last 20 years.

== History ==
First Keravnos logo.

The men's basketball department of Keravnos was established in 1964. The club was one of the founding members of the Cyprus Basketball Federation in 1966 and won its first national league in 1989.

Keravnos competed for 18 consecutive years in European competitions from 1995 to 2013. The first time Keravnos B.C. took part in European competitions was in 1982, when the team played against KK Zadar. In the 1997–98 season, just after winning their second league, the team reached the second round of a European Cup for the first time. In the Second Round, Keravnos achieved one of their greatest victories in the history of Cypriot Basketball after defeating Žalgiris Kaunas 61–57 in Nicosia. In the second leg, they lost at Kaunas and were eliminated from the competition. Žalgiris progressed to win the European Cup that year (1998) as well as the European Championship the following year (1999), known as Euroleague.

In 2001 the team won the Championship for a second consecutive time and also recorded the greatest success that had ever been achieved by any Cypriot sports team, in Pan-European competitions by qualifying for the quarter-finals of the European Saporta Cup. They defeated the Bosnian team KK Borac Banja Luka, before they were eliminated by Pamesa Valencia. During this campaign, the team defeated Red star of Belgrade and Paris Basket of Tony Parker among others.

In 2004, the team qualified to the Final Four of South Conference of FIBA Europe Cup Challenge, where the team finished fourth in the competition. They qualified to the final four again the following year (2005) and this time they finished in the third position. In 2007, Keravnos again recorded a new success story. The team qualified for the final of the EuroCup Challenge after beating in the semi-finals Dnipro twice in the semi-finals. Keravnos was the only Cypriot club from any sport ever to reach a major European Final. In the EuroCup Challenge Final, Keravnos faced the Russian Club from Samara, defeating them by 85–83 at home but the score was not enough to give the team the trophy after losing in Samara 101–81 away.

After this success, Keravnos achieved three more national titles, in 2008, 2017 and 2019.

After winning the Cypriot title in 2019, Keravnos played in the qualifying rounds of the Basketball Champions League. The club qualified for the BCL for the first time in club history after beating Iraklis and Donar. As such, it became the first Cypriot club ever to qualify for the competition.

== Players ==
=== Current roster ===
Keravnos roster
Players
Coaches

Pos.	No.	Nat.	Name	Ht.	Age
PG	0	(Cyprus)	Giannaras, Charalampos	1.83 m (6 ft 0 in)	23 – 2 June 2003
G	3	(Canada)	Samuels-Givance, Shamar	1.77 m (5 ft 10 in)	27 – 10 August 1999
F	4	(Cyprus)	Pasiali, Ioannis	2.03 m (6 ft 8 in)	29 – 1 November 1997
PG	5	(Cyprus)	Michael, Simon (C)	1.85 m (6 ft 1 in)	34 – 19 September 1992
PG	8	(Serbia)	Pusica, Vasilije	1.96 m (6 ft 5 in)	31 – 12 September 1995
SF	9	(Cyprus)	Stylianou, Nikos	1.98 m (6 ft 6 in)	38 – 9 November 1988
C	11	(Cyprus)	Koumis, Michalis	2.04 m (6 ft 8 in)	30 – 8 November 1996
G	13	(Cyprus)	Karagiannis, Michalis	1.96 m (6 ft 5 in)	18 – 14 December 2007
PG	23	(Cyprus)	Tigkas, Stefanos	1.85 m (6 ft 1 in)	20 – 28 December 2005
SF	24	(United States)	Flowers, Tyrn	2.06 m (6 ft 9 in)	28 – 17 January 1998
SG	25	(United States)	Allen, Trevon	1.88 m (6 ft 2 in)	28 – 16 February 1998
PF	30	(United States)	Crockett, Jaye	2.01 m (6 ft 7 in)	35 – 16 October 1991
C	32	(United States)	Grimes, Nathaniel	2.03 m (6 ft 8 in)	30 – 1 May 1996
F	50	(United States)	Williams, Eric	2.01 m (6 ft 7 in)
C	55	(United States)	Gresham, Brison	2.04 m (6 ft 8 in)	28 – 24 January 1998

Head coach

- (Cyprus) Vasilios Kounas

Assistant coach(es)

- (Cyprus) Ioannis Kampouris
- (Cyprus) Loizos Siakallis

Team manager

- (Greece) Angelos Papademetriou

Legend

- (C) Team captain
- Injured

- Roster
Updated: January 12, 2023

=== Notable players ===
Note: Flags indicate national team eligibility at FIBA-sanctioned events. Players may hold other non-FIBA nationalities not displayed.

Criteria

To appear in this section a player must have either:

- Set a club record or won an individual award while at the club
- Played at least one official international match for their national team at any time
- Played at least one official NBA match at any time.

- (Cyprus) Simon Michail
- (Cyprus) Nikolaos Stylianou
- (Cyprus) Ioannis Pasiali
- (Cyprus) Filippos Tigkas
- (Finland) Samuel Haanpää
- (The Gambia) Ousman Krubally
- (Israel) Guy Pnini
- (United States) Kenny Barker
- (United States) Lance Blanks
- (United States) Cedric Henderson
- (United States) Mike King
- (United States) Deondre Burns
- (United States) Zach Thomas
- (United States) Jaye Crockett
- (United States) Travis Taylor
- (United States) Shavar Reynolds Jr.

== Honours ==
=== Domestic ===
- Cyprus Basketball Division A

Winners (9): 1988–89, 1996–97, 1999–2000, 2000–01, 2007–08, 2016–17, 2018–19, 2021–22, 2023–24

- Cyprus Men's Basketball Cup:

Winners (13): 1988–89, 1996–97, 1997–98, 1998–99, 2004–05, 2005–06, 2006–07, 2009–10, 2011–12, 2018–19, 2021–22, 2023–24, 2024–25

- Cyprus Men's Basketball Supercup:

Winners (7): 1998, 1999, 2012, 2020, 2021, 2022, 2023

- Cypriot Second Division

Winners (2): 1978–79, 1987–88

=== European ===
- FIBA EuroCup Challenge
  - Runner-up (1): 2006–07

== Basketball academies ==
Since 1987, the club is focused nearly 100% in basketball and Keravnos Basketball Academies are considered as being the most dynamic and the most professional all over the island. Currently, the Basketball Academy has over 300 members and overall with Tennis and Football reach over 750 members. Head of the academy is Mr. Nicos Lambrias.
