= 2016–17 Cyprus Basketball Division B =

Cyprus Basketball Division B
- Teams: 9

The 2016–17 Cyprus Basketball Division B was the 29th season of the Cyprus Basketball Division B, the second-tier level men's professional basketball league on Cyprus.

== Competition format ==
Nine teams joined the regular season, where after a three-legs round-robin tournament, the six first qualified would join the playoffs for the promotion.

== Teams and locations ==
Team	City	Venue
AEL Limassol	Limassol	Nicos Solomonides
Achilleas Agrou	Agros	Glafkos Klerides
Achilleas Kaimakli	Kaimakli	Gymnasium Palouriotissas
Asteras Mesa Geitonias	Mesa Geitonia, Limassol	Kalogeropoulio Gymnasium
APOP	Paphos	Aphroditi Sports Hall
Cyprus U18	Limassol	Kalogeropoulio Gymnasium
ENAD Ayiou Dometiou	Ayios Dometios	Lefkotheo
Omonia	Nicosia	Eleftheria Indoor Hall
Zinonas Basketball	Larnaca	Municipal Centre of Larnaca

== Regular season ==
=== League table ===
Pos	Team	Pld	W	L	PF	PA	PD	Pts	Qualification
1	Achilleas Kaimakli	16	14	2	1058	715	+343	30	Qualification to Semifinals
2	AEL Limassol	16	14	2	1211	880	+331	30	Qualification to Semifinals
3	Achilleas Agrou	16	12	4	1062	962	+100	28	Qualification to Quarterfinals
4	APOP Paphos	16	10	6	997	863	+134	26	Qualification to Quarterfinals
5	Omonia	16	7	9	1047	1043	+4	23	Qualification to Quarterfinals
6	Asteras	16	6	10	996	1118	−122	22	Qualification to Quarterfinals
7	Cyprus U18	16	5	11	990	1078	−88	21	
8	ENAD	16	2	14	812	1141	−329	18	
9	Zinonas Basketball (R)	16	2	14	760	1133	−373	17	Relegation to Division C

Source: CBF
(R) Relegated

=== Results ===
Home \ Away	AEL	AGR	KAI	AST	APO	CYP	ENA	OMO	ZIN
AEL	—	67–52	56–46	75–54	76–63	88–62	62–50	65–56	108–50
Achilleas Agrou	58–56	—	36–61	84–64	52–64	72–69	75–29	80–58	77–55
Achilleas Kaimakli	75–40	82–61	—	67–42	59–44	58–42	73–40	66–43	98–43
Asteras	61–94	68–75	64–80	—	65–52	58–75	68–69	60–90	79–60
APOP Paphos	40–60	58–67	51–47	69–46	—	66–50	66–43	71–59	93–34
Cyprus U18	63–78	53–68	47–87	63–72	63–68	—	76–46	49–68	62–42
ENAD	44–100	58–74	57–75	43–58	44–66	61–70	—	63–77	63–58
Omonia	67–83	74–79	49–64	74–75	64–61	60–73	78–54	—	74–66
Zinonas Basketball	39–103	46–52	0–20	48–62	34–65	86–73	65–48	34–56	—

Source: CBF
Legend: Blue = home team win; Red = away team win.

== Playoffs ==
=== Quarterfinals ===
In the quarterfinals, teams playing against each other have to win two games to win the series. Thus, if one team wins two games before all three games have been played, the remaining game is omitted. The team that finished in the higher regular season place, is going to play the first and the third (if necessary) game of the series at home.

Team 1	Agg.	Team 2	Game 1	Game 2	Game 3
Achilleas Agrou	2–0	Asteras	83–57	83–56	–
APOP Paphos	2–1	Omonia	65–61	55–66	73–54

=== Semifinals ===
In the semifinals, teams playing against each other have to win three games to win the series. Thus, if one team wins three games before all five games have been played, the remaining games are omitted. The team that finished in the higher regular season place, is going to play the first, the third and the fifth (if necessary) game of the series at home.

Team 1	Agg.	Team 2	Game 1	Game 2	Game 3	Game 4	Game 5
AEL Limassol	3–2	Achilleas Agrou	72–69	57–87	66–64	71–74	65–51
Achilleas Kaimakli	3–2	APOP Paphos	62–67	56–45	65–54	44–61	67–57

== Final ==
In the finals, teams playing against each other have to win three games to win the series. Thus, if one team wins three games before all five games have been played, the remaining games are omitted. The team that finished in the higher regular season place, is going to play the first, the third and the fifth (if necessary) game of the series at home.

Team 1	Agg.	Team 2	Game 1	Game 2	Game 3	Game 4	Game 5
Achilleas Kaimakli	1–3	AEL Limassol	48–52	50–55	64–58	52–60	–
