= 2017–18 Cyprus Basketball Division B =

Cyprus Basketball Division B
- Teams: 8

Finals
- Champions: AEL Limassol (4th title)
- Runners-up: Omonia

The 2017–18 Cyprus Basketball Division B is the 30th season of the Cyprus Basketball Division B, the second-tier level men's professional basketball league on Cyprus.

== Competition format ==
Eight teams joined the regular season, where the four first qualified would join the playoffs for the promotion.

== Teams and locations ==
| Team | City | Venue |
|---|---|---|
| AEL Limassol | Limassol | Nicos Solomonides |
| Achilleas Agrou | Agros | Glafkos Klerides |
| Achilleas Kaimakli | Kaimakli | Gymnasium Palouriotissas |
| Asteras Mesa Geitonias | Mesa Geitonia | |
| ENAD Ayiou Dometiou | Ayios Dometios | Lefkotheo |
| Kentro Neon | Limassol | |
| National Guard | Nicosia | |
| Omonia | Nicosia | Eleftheria Indoor Hall |

== Regular season ==
=== League table ===
| Pos | Team | Pld | W | L | PF | PA | PD | Pts | Qualification |
|---|---|---|---|---|---|---|---|---|---|
| 1 | AEL Limassol | 14 | 13 | 1 | 981 | 771 | +210 | 27 | Qualification to Semifinals |
| 2 | Omonia | 14 | 10 | 4 | 935 | 781 | +154 | 24 | Qualification to Semifinals |
| 3 | Achilleas Agrou | 14 | 10 | 4 | 854 | 806 | +48 | 24 | Qualification to Quarterfinals |
| 4 | Achilleas Kaimakli | 14 | 9 | 5 | 839 | 751 | +88 | 23 | Qualification to Quarterfinals |
| 5 | ENAD | 14 | 7 | 7 | 877 | 900 | −23 | 21 | Qualification to Quarterfinals |
| 6 | Asteras | 14 | 4 | 10 | 775 | 872 | −97 | 18 | Qualification to Quarterfinals |
| 7 | National Guard | 14 | 2 | 12 | 775 | 936 | −161 | 15 | |
| 8 | K.N. Agios Nikolas (R) | 14 | 1 | 13 | 635 | 854 | −219 | 12 | Relegation to Division C |

Source: CBF
(R) Relegated

=== Results ===
| Home \ Away | AEL | AGR | KAI | AST | ENA | AGN | NAT | OMO |
|---|---|---|---|---|---|---|---|---|
| AEL | — | 56–63 | 77–56 | 88–43 | 74–57 | 20–0 | 81–55 | 53–49 |
| Achilleas Agrou | 54–67 | — | 58–54 | 64–50 | 57–44 | 81–45 | 83–65 | 71–74 |
| Kaimakli | 55–67 | 77–44 | — | 61–52 | 69–53 | 65–53 | 68–47 | 66–55 |
| Asteras | 84–88 | 52–60 | 67–66 | — | 62–73 | 51–49 | 60–64 | 69–77 |
| ENAD | 65–75 | 46–58 | 47–57 | 72–50 | — | 67–64 | 75–57 | 71–65 |
| K.N. Agios Nikolas | 59–77 | 49–60 | 0–20 | 0–20 | 67–70 | — | 84–81 | 65–89 |
| National Guard | 66–87 | 46–54 | 63–67 | 50–67 | 68–74 | 69–45 | — | 44–71 |
| Omonia | 65–71 | 81–47 | 68–58 | 60–48 | 77–63 | 84–55 | 20–0 | — |

Source: CBF
Legend: Blue = home team win; Red = away team win.

== Playoffs ==
=== Quarterfinals ===
In the quarterfinals, teams playing against each other have to win two games to win the series. Thus, if one team wins two games before all three games have been played, the remaining game is omitted. The team that finished in the higher regular season place, is going to play the first and the third (if necessary) game of the series at home.

| Team 1 | Agg. | Team 2 | Game 1 | Game 2 | Game 3 |
|---|---|---|---|---|---|
| Achilleas Agrou | 2–0 | Asteras | 64–48 | 65–69 | – |
| Achilleas Kaimakli | 2–0 | ENAD | 75–67 | 81–58 | – |

=== Semifinals ===
In the semifinals, teams playing against each other have to win three games to win the series. Thus, if one team wins three games before all five games have been played, the remaining games are omitted. The team that finished in the higher regular season place, is going to play the first and the third (if necessary) game of the series at home.

| Team 1 | Agg. | Team 2 | Game 1 | Game 2 | Game 3 |
|---|---|---|---|---|---|
| AEL Limassol | 2–1 | Achilleas Kaimakli | 70–58 | 57–62 | 54–51 |
| Omonia | 2–1 | Achilleas Agrou | 96–82 | 65–74 | 82–69 |

=== Final ===
In the finals, teams playing against each other have to win three games to win the series. Thus, if one team wins three games before all five games have been played, the remaining games are omitted. The team that finished in the higher regular season place, is going to play the first, the third and the fifth (if necessary) game of the series at home.

| Team 1 | Agg. | Team 2 | Game 1 | Game 2 | Game 3 | Game 4 | Game 5 |
|---|---|---|---|---|---|---|---|
| AEL Limassol | 3–0 | Omonia | 67–56 | 84–81 | 83–64 | – | – |
