= Antonis Constantinides =

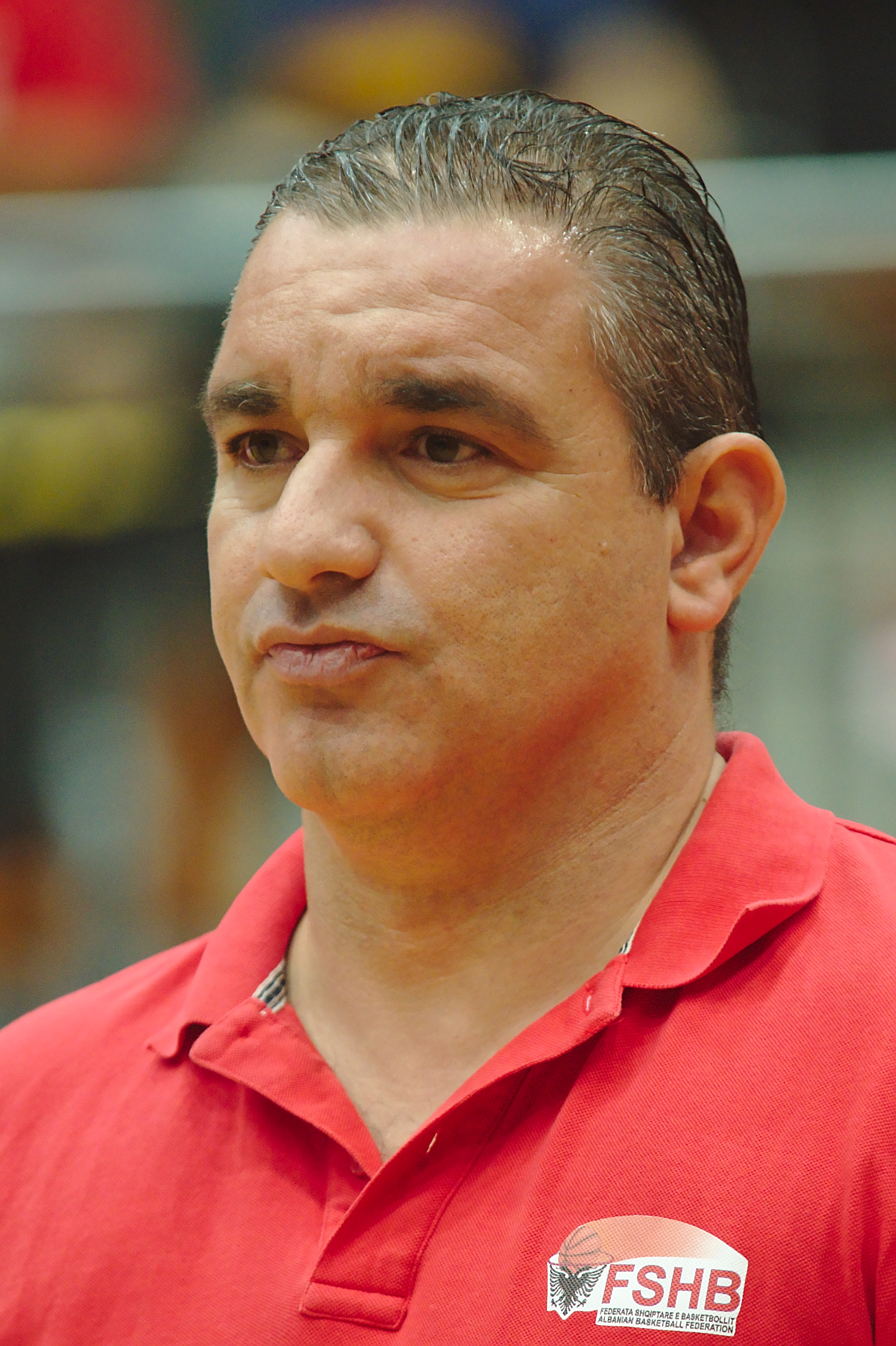

Egis Körmend
- Position: Head coach

Personal information
- Born: October 24, 1974 (age 52) Nicosia, Cyprus
- Listed height: 6 ft 1 in (1.85 m)
- Coaching career: 2004–present

Career history

Playing
- 1992–1997: Omonoia
- 1996–1998: Elliniko-Sourmena
- 1998–2000: Achilleas Agrou Limassol
- 2001–2002: Omonoia
- 2002–2003: Achilleas Agrou Limassol
- 2003–2004: Omonoia

Coaching
- 2004–2006: Omonoia
- 2007–2008: Phillips College
- 2008–2009: Cyprus U16
- 2008–2012: ETHA Engomis
- 2012–2014: APOEL
- 2014–2015: Energia
- 2015–2016: Sigal Prishtina
- 2016–2017: Albania
- 2016–2017: Rethymno Cretan Kings
- 2017–2018: APOEL
- 2018–2019: Dinamo București
- 2019–2020: Prishtina
- 2020–present: BC Egis Körmend

Career highlights
- Balkan League Champion (2016); Kosovo Superleague Champion (2016); Kosovo Cup winner (2016); 3× Cypriot League champion (2011, 2012, 2014); Cypriot Cup winner (2011)

Antonis Constantinides (born 24 October 1974) is a Cypriot professional basketball head coach, currently head coach of BC Körmend of the Hungarian league. He won both the Cypriot championship and cup titles in 2011 with ETHA Engomis, his first ever career titles, after which he was chosen 'coach of the year' for the 2010–11 season in Cyprus. He has experience in European competitions, participating regularly with his teams in the FIBA EuroChallenge.

== Personal life ==
Constantinides is a fluent speaker of the English and Greek language.
