= Polychronis Tsigkas =

Greek/Cypriot basketball player

Personal information
- Born: 27 August 2000 (age 26) Ioannina, Greece
- Listed height: 6 ft 4.5 in (1.94 m)
- Listed weight: 193 lb (88 kg)

Career information
- Playing career: 2021–present
- Position: Small forward
- Number: 14

Career history
- 2021-2022: Anorthosis Famagusta
- 2022-2023: Efkarpia
- 2023: Achilleas Kaimakliou
- 2024: Kavala
- 2024: Apollon Limassol
- 2024-2025: Asteras
- 2025-present: APOP Paphos

Polychronis Rafail Tsigkas (born August 27, 2000) is a Greek/Cypriot professional basketball player.

== Early years ==
Tsigkas was born from a Greek father and a Cypriot mother in Ioannina, Greece, where he spent his childhood. He started playing basketball in the youth teams of the local team AGS Ioanninon.

== Professional career ==
After playing some years in the minor divisions of Greece until 2020, Tsigkas started his professional career signing his first professional contract with Anorthosis Famagusta of the Cypriot Basket League for the 2021-22 season.

For the 2022-23 season he signed with Efkarpia B.C. of the Greek National League 1.

In July 2023 he signed with Achilleas Kaimakliou of the Cypriot Basket League. After 9 games he parted ways with the club.

In January 2024 he signed with Kavala B.C. of the Greek National League 1 for the rest of the season.

In August 2024 he signed with Apollon Limassol of the Cypriot Basket League. After 3 games his contract was terminated.

In December 2024 he signed with Asteras B.C. of the Cyprus B1 Basketball League, the second division of Cyprus.

== National team career ==
Tsigkas was eligible to represent Greece or Cyprus internationally due to his dual citizenship.

He was a member of the Greece men's national under-16 basketball team but he didn't manage to make it to the final squad for the 2016 FIBA U16 European Championship. He then decided to represent the Cyprus national basketball team for the rest of his life. He was a member of the Cyprus under-18 national team and Cyprus under-23 national team.

== Personal life ==
Tsigkas has both Greek and Cypriot citizenship.

His mother is Cypriot from Limassol.
