= Balša Radunović =

Montenegrin basketball player

Personal information
- Born: August 5, 1980 (age 46) Titograd, SR Montenegro, SFR Yugoslavia
- Listed height: 6 ft 10 in (2.08 m)
- Listed weight: 230 lb (104 kg)

Career information
- Playing career: 1998–2017
- Position: Power forward / center

Career history
- 1998–2000: Budućnost Podgorica
- 2002–2003: Pivovarna Laško
- 2003–2004: BCM Gravelines
- 2005–2006: AEL Limassol
- 2006–2008: APOEL
- 2009: Elektra Šoštanj
- 2009: Achilleas
- 2010: Elektra Šoštanj
- 2010–2011: ENAD
- 2011–2012: AEL Limassol
- 2012–2013: Lirija
- 2013–2014: AEK Larnaca
- 2014–2015: Zeta 2011
- 2015–2017: Mornar Bar

Balša Radunović (born August 5, 1980) is a retired professional Montenegrin basketball player. Standing at 2.06 m (6 ft 9 in), he played the forward-center position.
