= Cyprus Basketball All-Star Day =

- Status: Active
- Inaugurated: 2011
- Most recent: 2025
- Organizer: Cyprus Basketball Federation

The ECOMMBX Cyprus Basketball All-Star Game is an annual basketball event in Cyprus, established in 2011, organised by the Cyprus Basketball Federation and sponsored by ECOMMBX since 2024 and by OPAP until 2023.
The event is being held mostly at the end of the year, around Christmas time and consists of a game between a Cyprus/Europe and a Rest of the World team, a three-point shoot contest and slam-dunk exhibition activities which replaced the slam-dunk contest. Since its inception it has been considered the biggest annual basketball event in Cyprus. All the games have been held in the 6,000 Eleftheria Indoor Hall, in Nicosia.
The event was not held in 2020 and 2021 due to the pandemic, but it resumed on 17 December 2022.

== List of games ==
Bold: Team that won the game.

Year	Date	Arena	City	Team	Score	Team	MVP
2011	December 31	Eleftheria Indoor Hall	Nicosia	**Cyprus/Europe All Stars**	**76**-60	USA/Rest of the World	(United States) Charron Fisher
2012	December 31	Eleftheria Indoor Hall	Nicosia	Cyprus/Europe All Stars	82-**85**	**USA/Rest of the World**	(United States) Orion Outerbridge
2013	December 28	Costas Papaellinas, Strovolos	Nicosia	Cyprus/Europe All Stars	104-**115**	**USA/Rest of the World**	-
2014	December 28	Costas Papaellinas, Strovolos	Nicosia	Cyprus/Europe All Stars	85-**100**	**USA/Rest of the World**	-
2015	December 28	Eleftheria Indoor Hall	Nicosia	Cyprus/Europe All Stars	64-**79**	**USA All Stars**	-
2016	December 19	Eleftheria Indoor Hall	Nicosia	Cyprus/Europe All Stars	44-**66**	**USA/Rest of the World**	-
2017	December 16	Eleftheria Indoor Hall	Nicosia	Cyprus/Europe All Stars	50-**54**	**USA/Rest of the World**	-
2018	December 15	Eleftheria Indoor Hall	Nicosia	**Cyprus/Europe All Stars**	**62**-58	USA/Rest of the World	-
2019	December 14	Eleftheria Indoor Hall	Nicosia	Cyprus/Europe All Stars	62-**69**	**USA/Rest of the World**	-
2022	December 17	Eleftheria Indoor Hall	Nicosia	**Team Europe**	**100**-84	Team USA	-
2023	December 16	Eleftheria Indoor Hall	Nicosia	Team Sizo	65-**68**	**Team Stylianou**	-
2024	December 23	Eleftheria Indoor Hall	Nicosia	**Team Louis**	**70**-57	Team Sofokleous	(United States) Jonathan Cisse
2025	December 14	Eleftheria Indoor Hall	Nicosia	Team Dragons		Team Griffins	

== Three-Point Shoot Contest ==
Year	Player	Team
2011	(Serbia) Vukašin Mandić	APOEL
2012	(Serbia) Vukašin Mandić (2)	APOEL
2013	(United States) Tyler Laser	AEK Larnaca
2014	(United States) (Georgia (country)) Thaddus McFadden	AEK Larnaca
2015	(United States) Evan Smotrycz	Keravnos Strovolou
2016	(Cyprus) Aris Koronides	Keravnos Strovolou
2017	(Cyprus) Andreas Sizopoulos	AEK Larnaca
2018	(United States) Mike Balogun	Enosis Neon Paralimni
2019	(United States) Jordin Williams	Enosis Neon Paralimni
2022	(Cyprus) Nikolaos Stylianou	Keravnos Strovolou
2023	(United States) Sara Dickey	EKA AEL (Women's Cyprus League)
2024	(Cyprus) Nikolaos Stylianou (2)	Keravnos Strovolou

== Slam-Dunk champions ==
Year	Player	Team
2011	(United States) Isaac Wells	APOEL
2012	(United States) Isaac Wells (2)	APOEL
2013	(United States) Keith Gabriel	AEK Larnaca

== Players with most appearances ==
Player	All-Star	Editions	DOB	Notes
(Cyprus) Panagiotis Trisokkas	8	2011-2018	1980	
(Cyprus) Iakovos Panteli	6	2011, 2012, 2015, 2017, 2018, 2019	1985	
(Cyprus) Iezekel Papadopoulos	6	2011-2014, 2018, 2019	1982	
(Cyprus) Andreas Sizopoulos	4	2014-2017	1983	1x Three-Point Contest Winner
(Croatia) Tomislav Petrovic	4	2014-2017	1985	
(Cyprus) Andreas Pilavas	4	2011-2014	1983	
(Cyprus) Simon Michail	4	2014, 2016, 2017, 2019	1992	

== See also ==
- HEBA Greek All-Star Game
