= Cyprus Basketball Division B =

- Founded: 1988; 37 years ago
- First season: 1988–89
- Country: Cyprus
- Confederation: FIBA Europe
- Number of teams: 8
- Level on pyramid: 2
- Promotion to: Cyprus Basketball Division A
- Relegation to: Cyprus Basketball Division C
- Domestic cup: Cypriot Cup
- Current champions: Digenis Morphou B.C.
- Most championships: AEL Limassol (4 titles)
- 2017–18 Cyprus Basketball Division B

The Cypriot Basketball Division B is currently the second-tier level men's professional basketball competition of the Cypriot basketball league system. It is run and governed by the Cyprus Basketball Federation.

== Format ==
At present, eight clubs compete in the league. One team (the last one) at the end of the season is promoted to the first division, whilst one team from the first division is relegated.

== Teams ==
The following six teams (in alphabetical order) are competing in the 2017–18 season:

- AEL - Limassol
- Achilleas Agrou - Agros, Limassol
- Achilleas Kaimakli - Kaimakli, Nicosia
- Asteras - Mesa Geitonia, Limassol
- ENAD - Ayios Dometios, Nicosia
- Kentro Neon - Limassol
- National Guard - Nicosia
- Omonia - Nicosia

== Champions ==
Season	Champion
1988–89	Omonia
1989–90	Aris Limassol
1990–91	EPA Larnaca
1991–92	Aris Limassol
1992–93	AEL Limassol
1993–94	Omonia
1994–95	Olympos Aglandjia
1995–96	ETHA Engomis
1996–97	Doxa Strovolou
1997–98	Achilleas Agrou

Season	Champion
1998–99	Enosis Neon Paralimni
1999–00	Omonia
2000–01	ETHA Engomis
2001–02	Digenis Akritas Morphou
2002–03	Asteras Mesa Geitonias
2003–04	Digenis Akritas Morphou
2004–05	AEK Larnaca
2005–06	Achilleas Kaimakli
2006–07	AEK Larnaca
2007–08	Anagennisi Germasogeias

Season	Champion
2008–09	Digenis Akritas Morphou
2009–10	Enosis Neon Paralimni
2010–11	APOP Paphos
2011–12	Anagennisi Germasogeias
2012–13	Olympos Agiou Nikolaou
2013–14	Achilleas Kaimakli
2014–15	Anagennisi Germasogeias
2015–16	AEL Limassol
2016–17	AEL Limassol
2021–22	Digenis Morphou

== Performance by club ==
Team	Winners	Years won
AEL Limassol	4	1993, 2016, 2017, 2018
Omonia	3	1989, 1994, 2000
Digenis Akritas Morphou	4	2002, 2004, 2009,2022
Anagennisi Germasogeias	3	2008, 2012, 2015
Aris Limassol	2	1990, 1992
ETHA Engomis	2	1996, 2001
AEK Larnaca	2	2005, 2007
Enosis Neon Paralimni	2	1999, 2010
Achilleas Kaimakli	2	2006, 2014
EPA Larnaca	1	1991
Olympos Aglandjia	1	1995
Doxa Strovolou	1	1997
Achilleas Agrou	1	1998
Asteras Mesa Geitonias	1	2003
APOP Paphos	2	2011, 2019
Olympos Agiou Nikolaou	1	2013

== See also ==
- Cyprus Basketball Division A
- Cypriot Basketball Cup
