= Tyreek Duren =

American basketball player

No. 23 – Club Atlético Aguada
- Position: Point guard
- League: LUB

Personal information
- Born: October 15, 1991 (age 35) Philadelphia, Pennsylvania, U.S.
- Listed height: 6 ft 0 in (1.83 m)
- Listed weight: 189 lb (86 kg)

Career information
- High school: Neumann-Goretti (Philadelphia, Pennsylvania)
- College: La Salle (2010–2014)
- NBA draft: 2014: undrafted
- Playing career: 2014–present

Career history
- 2014–2015: AEK Larnaca
- 2015–2016: Trefl Sopot
- 2016–2017: SOMB
- 2017–2018: AEK Larnaca
- 2018: Kolossos Rodou
- 2018–2019: AEK Larnaca
- 2019–2020: Panionios
- 2020–2021: ZTE
- 2021–present: Aguada

Career highlights
- 2x Cypriot League champion (2015, 2018); Cypriot Cup winner (2018); Cypriot Cup MVP (2018); Cypriot Super Cup winner (2017); Cypriot League All-Star (2017); 2× Second-team All-Atlantic 10 (2013, 2014)

Tyreek Duren (born October 15, 1991) is an American professional basketball player for ZTE of the Hungarian League. The point guard attended Saints John Neumann and Maria Goretti Catholic High School in Philadelphia, Pennsylvania. He has earned Atlantic 10 Conference Second-Team recognition for two consecutive years.

Duren signed with Athletes Untapped as a private basketball coach on June 6, 2024.
