= Quentin Snider =

American basketball player

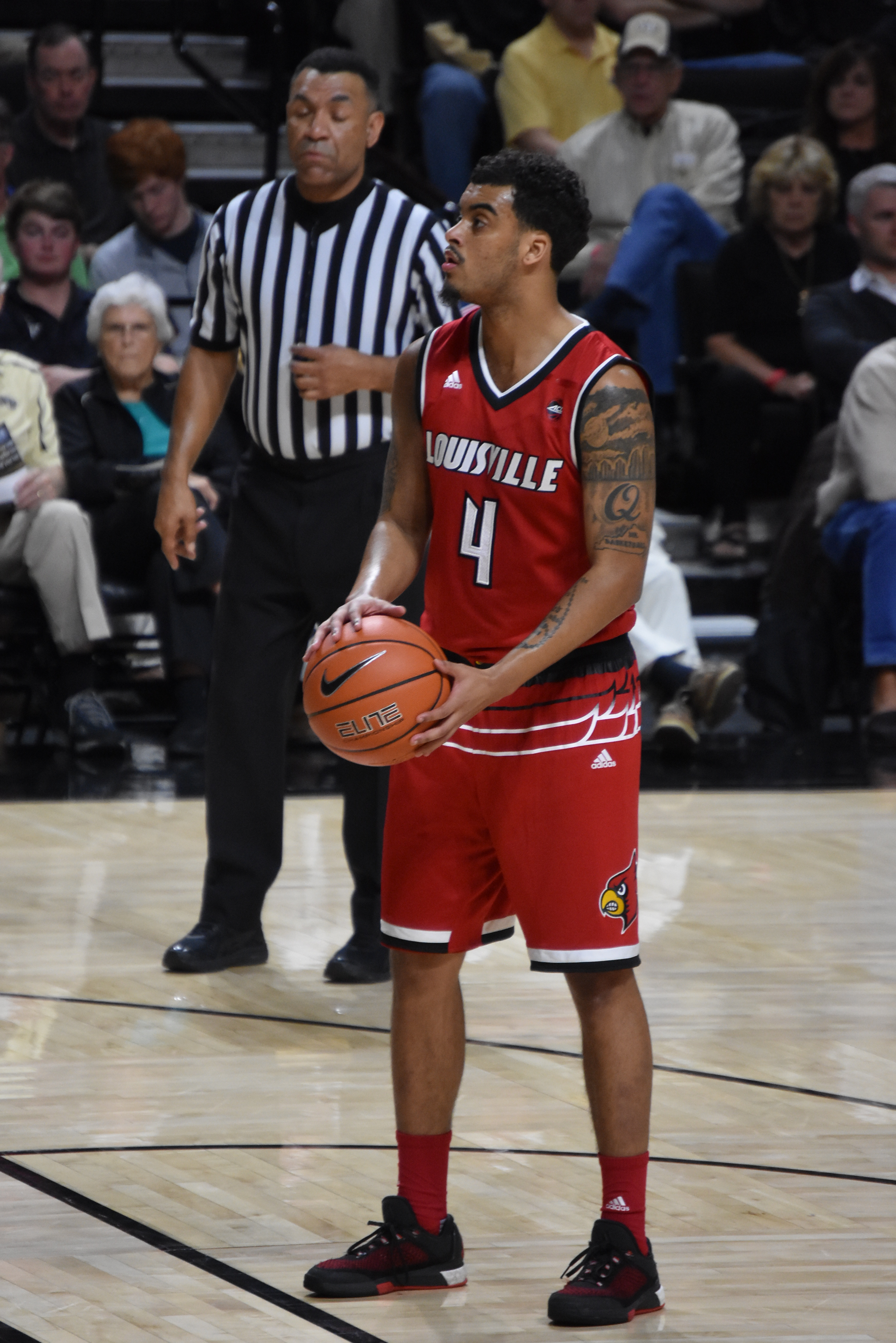
- Snider with Louisville in 2017

Personal information
- Born: February 14, 1996 (age 30) Louisville, Kentucky, U.S.
- Listed height: 1.88 m (6 ft 2 in)

Career information
- High school: Ballard (Louisville, Kentucky)
- College: Louisville (2014–2018)
- NBA draft: 2018: undrafted
- Playing career: 2018–present
- Position: Point guard
- Number: 4

Career history
- 2018: Benfica
- 2018–2019: Imortal
- 2019–2020: Feyenoord
- 2020–2022: AEK Larnaca
- 2022: Stal Ostrów Wielkopolski
- 2022–2023: AEK Larnaca

Career highlights
- Polish Supercup winner (2022); Cypriot League champion (2021); 2x Cypriot Cup winner (2021, 2023); Cypriot League All-Star (2022); Kentucky Mr. Basketball (2014)

Quentin Snider (born February 14, 1996) is an American professional basketball player.

== High school career ==
Snider played for Ballard High School, at Louisville, Kentucky.

== College career ==
Snider played for Louisville from 2014 until 2018.

== Professional career ==
Snider started his professional with Benfica in Portugal. After he played ten games for Benfica he was waived. As a result, he signed with Portuguese club Imortal. With Imortal, he averaged 7 points and 3.4 assists per game.

In September 2019, Snider signed with Feyenoord of the Dutch Basketball League (DBL). He led the team in scoring with 19.1 points per game.

On August 7, 2020, he joined AEK Larnaca of the Cypriot League. Snider averaged 14.9 points, 3.9 rebounds, 5.8 assists, and 1.1 steals per game. On June 27, 2021, he re-signed with the team.

On July 21, 2022, he has signed with Stal Ostrów Wielkopolski of the Polish Basketball League (PLK).
