= 2017–18 Cyprus Basketball Division A =

Cyprus Basketball Division A
- Teams: 7

Regular season
- Relegated: APOP

Finals
- Champions: Petrolina AEK (4th title)
- Runners-up: Keravnos

The 2017–18 Cyprus Basketball Division A is the 51st season of the Cyprus Basketball Division A, the top-tier level men's professional basketball league on Cyprus.

== Competition format ==
Seven teams joined the regular season, where after a three-legs round-robin tournament, the four first qualified would join the playoffs for the title.

== Teams and locations ==
Locations of the 2017–18 Cyprus Basketball Division A teams

Team	City	Venue
APOEL	Nicosia	Lefkotheo
Apollon	Limassol	Apollon Arena
APOP	Paphos	Aphroditi Sports Hall
Enosis Neon	Paralimni	Avgorou Technical School
ETHA	Engomi	Eleftheria Indoor Hall
Keravnos	Strovolos	Costas Papaellinas Arena
Petrolina AEK	Larnaca	Kition Athletic Center

== Regular season ==
=== League table ===
Pos	Team	Pld	W	L	PF	PA	PD	Pts	Qualification
1	Petrolina AEK	18	15	3	1560	1330	+230	33	Qualification to semifinals
2	Keravnos	18	15	3	1472	1218	+254	33	Qualification to semifinals
3	APOEL	18	11	7	1458	1404	+54	29	Qualification to quarterfinals
4	Enosis Neon	18	9	9	1329	1361	−32	27	Qualification to quarterfinals
5	ETHA	18	6	12	1390	1460	−70	24	Qualification to quarterfinals
6	Apollon	18	4	14	1236	1429	−193	22	Qualification to quarterfinals
7	APOP	18	3	15	1288	1531	−243	21	Relegation to Division B

Source: CBF, CBF

=== Results ===
==== First round ====
Home \ Away	APO	LIM	PAP	PAR	ETH	KER	AEK
APOEL	—	96–67	86–82	65–59	66–76	71–87	82–84
Apollon	76–82	—	68–61	67–78	53–79	68–75	70–79
APOP	58–75	76–82	—	53–73	72–71	71–93	62–81
Enosis Neon	77–76	74–67	96–88	—	76–71	69–68	62–74
ETHA	83–78	80–61	83–66	83–76	—	73–93	69–91
Keravnos	74–67	82–44	88–63	69–58	89–77	—	74–82
Petrolina AEK	90–102	87–61	106–77	102–71	79–70	84–75	—

Source: CBF
Legend: Blue = home team win; Red = away team win.

==== Second round ====
Home \ Away	APO	LIM	PAP	PAR	ETH	KER	AEK
APOEL	—	82–73	—	90–83	—	—	94–87
Apollon	—	—	92–76	—	87–84	66–75	—
APOP	65–71	—	—	76–74	—	—	73–118
Enosis Neon	—	81–73	—	—	104–81	—	61–73
ETHA	93–102	—	88–97	—	—	48–84	—
Keravnos	90–73	—	86–72	85–57	—	—	—
Petrolina AEK	—	82–61	—	—	86–81	75–85	—

Source: CBF
Legend: Blue = home team win; Red = away team win.
Matches with lighter background shading were decided after overtime.

== Playoffs ==
=== Bracket ===
Seeded teams played games 1, 2 and (if necessary) 5 at home.

Quarterfinals
Enosis Neon	2
ETHA	0
APOEL	2
Apollon	1

Semifinals
Petrolina AEK	3
Enosis Neon	0
Keravnos	3
APOEL	1

Finals
Petrolina AEK	3
Keravnos	0

=== Quarterfinals ===
In the quarterfinals, teams playing against each other have to win two games to win the series. Thus, if one team wins two games before all three games have been played, the remaining game is omitted. The team that finished in the higher regular season place, is going to play the first and the third (if necessary) game of the series at home.

Team 1	Series	Team 2	Game 1	Game 2	Game 3
APOEL	2–1	Apollon	76–70	76–80	79–52
Enosis Neon	2–0	ETHA	82–46	83–45	

=== Semifinals ===
In the semifinals, teams playing against each other have to win three games to win the series. Thus, if one team wins three games before all five games have been played, the remaining games are omitted. The team that finished in the higher regular season place, is going to play the first, the third and the fifth (if necessary) game of the series at home.

Team 1	Series	Team 2	Game 1	Game 2	Game 3	Game 4	Game 5
Petrolina AEK	3–0	Enosis Neon	83–61	96–70	57–54		
Keravnos	3–1	APOEL	94–69	79–81	80–71	81–66	

=== Finals ===
In the finals, teams playing against each other have to win three games to win the series. Thus, if one team wins three games before all five games have been played, the remaining games are omitted. The team that finished in the higher regular season place, is going to play the first, the third and the fifth (if necessary) game of the series at home.

Team 1	Series	Team 2	Game 1	Game 2	Game 3	Game 4	Game 5
Petrolina AEK	3–0	Keravnos	69–60	76–70	69–64		
