= Josh Hagins =

American basketball player (born 1994)

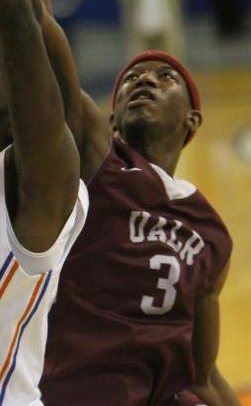
- Hagins in action with Little Rock

Free agent
- Position: Point guard / shooting guard

Personal information
- Born: March 17, 1994 (age 32) Washington, D.C., U.S.
- Listed height: 6 ft 1 in (1.85 m)
- Listed weight: 180 lb (82 kg)

Career information
- High school: Airline (Bossier City, Louisiana)
- College: Little Rock (2012–2016)
- NBA draft: 2016: undrafted
- Playing career: 2016–present

Career history
- 2016: Bosna Royal
- 2017: Maine Red Claws
- 2017–2018: Reno Bighorns
- 2018–2020: Keravnos
- 2020–2021: Telekom Baskets Bonn
- 2021: Iraklis Thessaloniki
- 2021: Peristeri
- 2021–2022: Debrecen
- 2022–2023: Aris Thessaloniki
- 2023–2024: Ontario Clippers
- 2024: Al-Rayyan
- 2024–2025: Keravnos
- 2025: BC Gargždai
- 2025–2026: Shijiazhuang Xianglan
- 2026: Hapoel Holon

Career highlights
- Cypriot League champion (2019); 2x Cypriot Cup winner (2019, 2025); Cypriot Super Cup winner (2019); 2x Cypriot League All-Star (2018, 2019); First-team All-Sun Belt (2016); Third-team All-Sun Belt (2015)

Josh Hagins (born March 17, 1994) is an American professional basketball player . He played college basketball for the Little Rock Trojans.

== Early life and high school ==
Hagins was born in Washington, D.C. and is the son of Janell and Michael Larkin, coming from a military family who lived in Little Rock, Arkansas while his family was stationed in the region. He has an older brother D.J. Berry. Airline High School in Bossier City, Louisiana, Hagins' current hometown, he was named District, City and Parish MVP, respectively. Guided the Vikings to 3 district titles, being an All-State selection during that span. He led the Vikings to a 24–9 record (6–0 district), being two-time district champions and reaching state quarterfinals.

== College career ==
Hagins enrolled in the University of Arkansas at Little Rock in 2012. Hagins ended his freshman year being the 3rd in points, albeit leading the team in assists. He played in 31 games that season, starting in 12.

Hagins had his sophomore season again leading his team in assists, 2nd in points, 3rd in rebounds. Ranked sixth in the conference in assists (3.7 apg), 10th in steals (1.2 spg), 12th in 3-pointers made per game (1.5), 13th in blocks (0.7 bpg) and seventh in assist-to-turnover ratio (1.6).

He had a breakout year as a junior, being named to third team at Sun Belt. This time, he led the team in points, assists, being the 4th in rebounds. Among Sun Belt Conference individuals, ranked 14th in scoring, eighth in assists, third in free throw shooting percentage, seventh in steals and fifth in assist-to-turnover ratio. Scored in double figures 20 times on the season, including 14 of 16 games to close the season, and led UALR with 93 assists and a career-high 52 steals.

In his senior year, he had his best year, aside from being the offensive reference in the team, leading the team in points and assists, he was named to All-Sun Belt First Team honors for the first time. He guided his team to the Sun Belt tournament title, despite underperforming in the final game, against UL Monroe, won by Little Rock 70–50.

Little Rock made it to the 2016 NCAA tournament, their first appearance since 2011. They faced Big Ten's Purdue. Little Rock was down 65–52 with 3:33 left, and Hagins tied the game with a 3-pointer to send it to overtime. The Trojans eventually won 85–83, in 2 overtimes. It was their first tournament win since 1986. Hagins is the 3rd player to score 30+ points against Purdue in the NCAA tournament, aside Isiah Thomas and Lew Alcindor.

== Professional career ==
After going undrafted in the 2016 NBA draft, Hagins joined the Sacramento Kings for the 2016 NBA Summer League On October 11, 2016, he signed with KK Bosna Royal of the Bosnian League. In 10 games, he averaged 10.4 points, 3.3 assists and 3.4 rebounds in 22.4 minutes.

=== Maine Red Claws (2017) ===
On January 26, he was acquired by the Maine Red Claws of the NBA Development League.

On July 31, 2020, he signed with Telekom Baskets Bonn of the Basketball Bundesliga (BBL).

On February 21, 2021, Hagins moved to Iraklis of the Greek Basket League. In 9 games, he averaged 14 points (44% from the field, 41% from beyond the arc, 85% from the free throw line), 3 rebounds, and 5 assists, in 29 minutes per contest.

On July 25, 2021, he signed with fellow Greek club Peristeri. On December 2 of the same year, he mutually parted ways with Peristeri. Hagins subsequently finished out the season with Hungarian club Debreceni, averaging 11.7 points, 5.7 rebounds and 5 assists in 20 games.

On July 24, 2022, Hagins returned to Greece for a third stint, this time signing for Aris Thessaloniki. In 19 domestic league games, he averaged 7.3 points, 2.3 rebounds, 4.7 assists and 1.4 steals, playing around 22 minutes per contest.

=== Ontario Clippers (2023–2024) ===
On October 30, 2023, Hagins joined the Ontario Clippers.

=== Al-Rayyan (2024) ===
After the end of the G League season, Hagins signed with Al-Rayyan of the Qatari Basketball League.

=== BC Gargždai (2025) ===
On 14 September 2025, Hagins signed with BC Gargždai of the Lithuanian Basketball League (LKL).

=== Shijiazhuang Xianglan (2025–present) ===
On 4 December 2025, Hagins left BC Gargždai and signed with Shijiazhuang Xianglan of the Chinese National Basketball League (NBL).

== Personal life ==
Hagins has two brothers, D.J. Berry and Kerrick Larkin and a sister, Kerita Larkin. Hagins is single. While he was at Little Rock, he majored in health science.
