= 2014–15 Cyprus Basketball Division A =

Cyprus Basketball Division A
- Duration: November 1, 2014 – April 21, 2015
- Games played: 21
- Teams: 8

Regular season
- Top seed: APOEL

Finals
- Champions: AEK Larnaca; 2nd title
- Runners-up: APOEL
- Semifinalists: Keravnos; ETHA Engomis

Statistical leaders
Points	(United States) Tony Weeden	18.4
Rebounds	(United States) Trey Britton	10.2
Assists	(Sweden) Thomas Massamba	5.4

The 2014–15 Cyprus Basketball Division A was the 48th season of the Cyprus Basketball Division A, the top-tier level professional basketball league on Cyprus. The season started on November 1, 2014, and ended April 21, 2015. AEK Larnaca won the national championship.

== Regular season ==
Pos	Team	Pld	W	L	PF	PA	PD	Pts	Qualification
1	APOEL	21	18	3	1484	1205	+279	36	Qualification to Playoffs
2	AEK Larnaca (O, C)	21	15	6	1502	1255	+247	30	Qualification to Playoffs
3	Keravnos	21	14	7	1479	1264	+215	28	Qualification to Playoffs
4	ETHA Engomis	21	13	8	1418	1265	+153	26	Qualification to Playoffs
5	Apollon Limassol	21	11	10	1364	1490	−126	22	
6	Enosis Neon Paralimni	21	9	12	1308	1345	−37	18	
7	Omonia	21	4	17	1253	1564	−311	8	
8	AEL Limassol (Note: AEL Limassol was dissolved in October 2014, and the Cypriot Basketball Federation expelled all results of the team.)	21	0	21	0	0	0	0	Dissolved

Source: OddsPortal.com
(C) Champions; (O) Play-off winners

=== Rounds 1-12 ===
Home \ Away	APO	ETH	KER	LAR	LIM	NEO	OMO
APOEL B.C.		55–59	85–76	82–75	83–58	72–60	88–50
ETHA Engomis	79–69		81–88	84–79	78–60	67–50	88–68
Keravnos B.C.	64–57	67–61		71–73	81–76	77–61	92–54
AEK Larnaca B.C.	63–71	76–69	84–70		89–68	80–65	74–62
Apollon Limassol	64–69	90–74	83–80	84–78		79–68	76–55
Enosis Neon Paralimni FC	73–79	64–55	63–69	50–66	91–73		89–72
Omonia BC	63–92	63–93	63–90	56–96	80–83	58–76	

Legend: Blue = home team win; Yellow = draw; Red = away team win.

=== Rounds 13-18 ===
Home \ Away	APO	ETH	KER	LAR	LIM	NEO	OMO
APOEL B.C.		73–68		94–73		87–67	
ETHA Engomis				96–90	70–74		80–57
Keravnos B.C.	81–82	69–85				82–59	
AEK Larnaca B.C.			72–51		110–49		93–77
Apollon Limassol	58–99		62–112			94–88	
Enosis Neon Paralimni FC		73–71		56–71			95–93
Omonia BC	74–87		63–99		85–73		

Legend: Blue = home team win; Yellow = draw; Red = away team win.

== Playoffs ==
Semifinals
1	APOEL	3
4	ETHA Engomis	2
2	AEK Larnaca	3
3	Keravnos	1

Finals
1	APOEL	1
2	AEK Larnaca	3
