= Achilleas Agrou =

- Division: Division B
- Leagues: 1 Division B
- Founded: 1988
- Arena: Sports Center Glafkos Clerides
- Capacity: 500
- Location: Agros
- Team colours: Yellow, Blue
- President: Lambros Lambrou
- Team manager: Kipros Grigoriou

Achilleas Agrou (official name "Achilleas Agrou Athletic Club") is a sports association of the Agros Community in the Limassol District. It was founded on 8 May 1958 in the village of Agrou by village residents, as a cultural group, with the first official football section, with the aim of spreading the sports to the community. Today, the club has a basketball team that participates in the Division B, as well as teams of Teenagers (U19) and children (U16) participating in the Cyprus Basketball Federation championships. During the period 2014–2015 the basketball team re-opened and managed to reach the final of the championship, where it lost from the Anagennisi Germasogeias.

== Basketball ==
In 1988 the basketball section of Achilleas Agrou was founded, which was the first to participate in the Division B in the period 1988–1989. In the late 1990s, the team will make history, as after winning the first basketball championship in 1998, the team will be in the Division A and will be able to stay in it for four years. At a greater moment in this period, the participation in the 2001 Cup semifinals were missed by APOEL. After a period of 4 years when the basketball team was inactive, in September 2014 it re-opened and managed to reach the final of the championship.

=== Home ground ===
Since the foundation of the basketball section in 1988, the basketball court of the Apisitio Agros Gymnasium (a capacity of 250 fans). Since 2007, the ground of the team has been moved to the modern Sports Center "Glafkos Clerides", where it is used until today.

=== Νotable players ===
- Christos Spirou
- Michalis Hadjifedonos

=== Honors ===
- Cyprus Basketball Division B (1): 1997–1998

== Sources ==
- Προφίλ ομάδας στο all4basketball.com
- Αθλητισμός στον Αγρό
