= 2015–16 Cyprus Basketball Division A =

Cyprus Basketball Division A
- Duration: 6 November 2015 – 3 May 2016
- Teams: 8

Regular season
- Relegated: Omonia; Anagennisi

Finals
- Champions: AEK Larnaca; 3rd title
- Runners-up: APOEL

The 2015–16 Cyprus Basketball Division A was the 49th season of the Cyprus Basketball Division A, the top-tier level professional basketball league on Cyprus. The season started on November 6, 2015, and ended on May 3, 2016. AEK Larnaca won the previous championship, and successfully defended its title.

== Competition format ==
The participating teams first play a conventional round-robin schedule, with every team playing each opponent once "home" and once "away", for a total of 14 games. The league is then split up into two groups of four teams, with each of them playing teams within its group in a home-and-away cycle of games. The bottom four clubs play for one direct relegation spot, and one relegation play-off spot. Records earned in the first round are taken over to the respective Second round.

The four teams of the top group will join the championship playoffs.

== Regular season ==
Pos	Team	Pld	W	L	PF	PA	PD	Pts	Qualification
1	AEK Larnaca (C)	20	17	3	1559	1349	+210	37	Qualification to Playoffs Semi-finals
2	Keravnos	20	15	5	1415	1257	+158	35	Qualification to Playoffs Semi-finals
3	APOEL	20	13	7	1549	1446	+103	33	Qualification to Playoffs Quarter-finals
4	Apollon Limassol	20	9	11	1580	1581	−1	29	Qualification to Playoffs Quarter-finals
5	ETHA Engomis	20	14	6	1829	1696	+133	34	Qualification to Playoffs Quarter-finals
6	Enosis Neon Paralimni	20	7	13	1533	1601	−68	27	Qualification to Playoffs Quarter-finals
7	Omonia (R)	20	5	15	1545	1645	−100	25	Qualification to Playout
8	Anagennisi (R)	20	0	20	1392	1827	−435	20	Qualification to Playout

Source: Eurobasket.com
(C) Champions; (R) Relegated

=== Rounds 1-14 ===
Home \ Away	AEK	ANA	APO	APL	ENP	ETH	KER	OMO
AEK Larnaca		88–55	74–69	76–63	80–63	87–82	50–76	72–62
Anagennisi	55–91		67–77	74–86	43–87	62–85	57–105	73–102
APOEL	67–72	84–64		68–76	70–60	78–63	65–51	75–63
Apollon Limassol	89–78	91–64	74–76		76–67	86–88	55–57	85–76
Enosis Neon Paralimni	54–76	93–75	72–79	92–98		72–94	56–70	71–68
ETHA Engomis	89–99	114–75	83–101	91–85	116–80		72–75	75–67
Keravnos	57–62	93–81	76–62	68–73	63–53	87–73		58–56
Omonia	61–78	87–83	68–78	66–82	69–83	78–90	70–83	

Legend: Blue = home team win; Yellow = draw; Red = away team win.

=== Rounds 15-20 ===
Home \ Away	AEK	ANA	APO	APL	ENP	ETH	KER	OMO
AEK Larnaca			87–81	88–65			59–48	
Anagennisi					61–76	84–92		98–105
APOEL	70–90			82–65			55–50	
Apollon Limassol	62–80		67–76				57–65	
Enosis Neon Paralimni		77–67				74–76		98–86
ETHA Engomis		92–72			82–75			111–93
Keravnos	81–72		71–65	81–64				
Omonia		102–82			81–77	85–93		

Legend: Blue = home team win; Yellow = draw; Red = away team win.

== Playoffs ==
=== Bracket ===
Quarterfinals
4	Apollon Limassol	2
5	ETHA Engomis	0
3	APOEL	2
6	Enosis Neon Paralimni	0

Semifinals
1	AEK Larnaca	3
4	Apollon Limassol	0
2	Keravnos	1
3	APOEL	3

Finals
1	AEK Larnaca	3
3	APOEL	0

=== Quarter-finals ===
Team 1	Agg.	Team 2	Game 1	Game 2	Game 3
Apollon Limassol	2–0	ETHA Engomis	81–68	91–74	
APOEL	2–0	Enosis Neon Paralimni	71–53	76–28	

=== Semi-finals ===
Team 1	Agg.	Team 2	Game 1	Game 2	Game 3	Game 4	Game 5
AEK Larnaca	3–0	Apollon Limassol	83–76	77–70	97–53		
Keravnos	1–3	APOEL	76–71	71–83	77–79	60–72	

=== Finals ===
Team 1	Agg.	Team 2	Game 1	Game 2	Game 3	Game 4	Game 5
AEK Larnaca	3–0	APOEL	82–76	76–66	81–74		

== Playout ==
=== First leg ===
28 March 2016
18:00

Report

Omonia	96–78	Anagennisi
Scoring by quarter: 20–22, 27–14, 29–20, 20–22

Eleftheria Indoor Hall, Nicosia
Attendance: 100
Referees: Santos Charalambos, Kiprianou Marios, Christou Kyriakos

=== Second leg ===
30 March 2016
20:15

Report

Anagennisi	74–97	Omonia
Scoring by quarter: 18–29, 21–23, 9–30, 26–15

Spyros Kyprianou Athletic Center, Limassol
Attendance: 100
Referees: Stylianou Michalis, Plakotas Giannis, Hadjisathis Giorgos
