= Trey Britton =

American professional basketball player

Free agent
- Position: Center

Personal information
- Born: June 1, 1989 (age 36) Alpharetta, Georgia, U.S.
- Listed height: 6 ft 8 in (2.03 m)
- Listed weight: 214 lb (97 kg)

Career information
- High school: South Forsyth (Cumming, Georgia)
- College: Anderson (2007–2011)
- NBA draft: 2011: undrafted
- Playing career: 2011–present

Career history
- 2011–2012: Aanekosken Huima
- 2013–2014: Gunma CraneThunders
- 2014–2015: Omonia
- 2015: UJAP Quimper 29
- 2015–2016: Kutaisi 2010

Career highlights
- Cypriot League rebounding leader (2015)

Trey Britton (born June 1, 1989) is an American professional basketball player.

== Professional career ==
He started his career with Aanekosken Huima, in the Finnish second division in 2011–12.

In the 2013–14 season, he played in the Japanese bj league with Gunma CraneThunders.

In the 2014–15 season, Britton was a member of Omonia. Britton was the leading rebounder of the Cypriotic League, averaging 10.2 rebounds per game.

=== The Basketball Tournament ===
In 2017, Britton participated in The Basketball Tournament for team Showtime. The team was eliminated in the first round. The Basketball Tournament is an annual $2 million winner-take-all tournament broadcast on ESPN.
