= Taveion Hollingsworth =

American basketball player (born 1999)

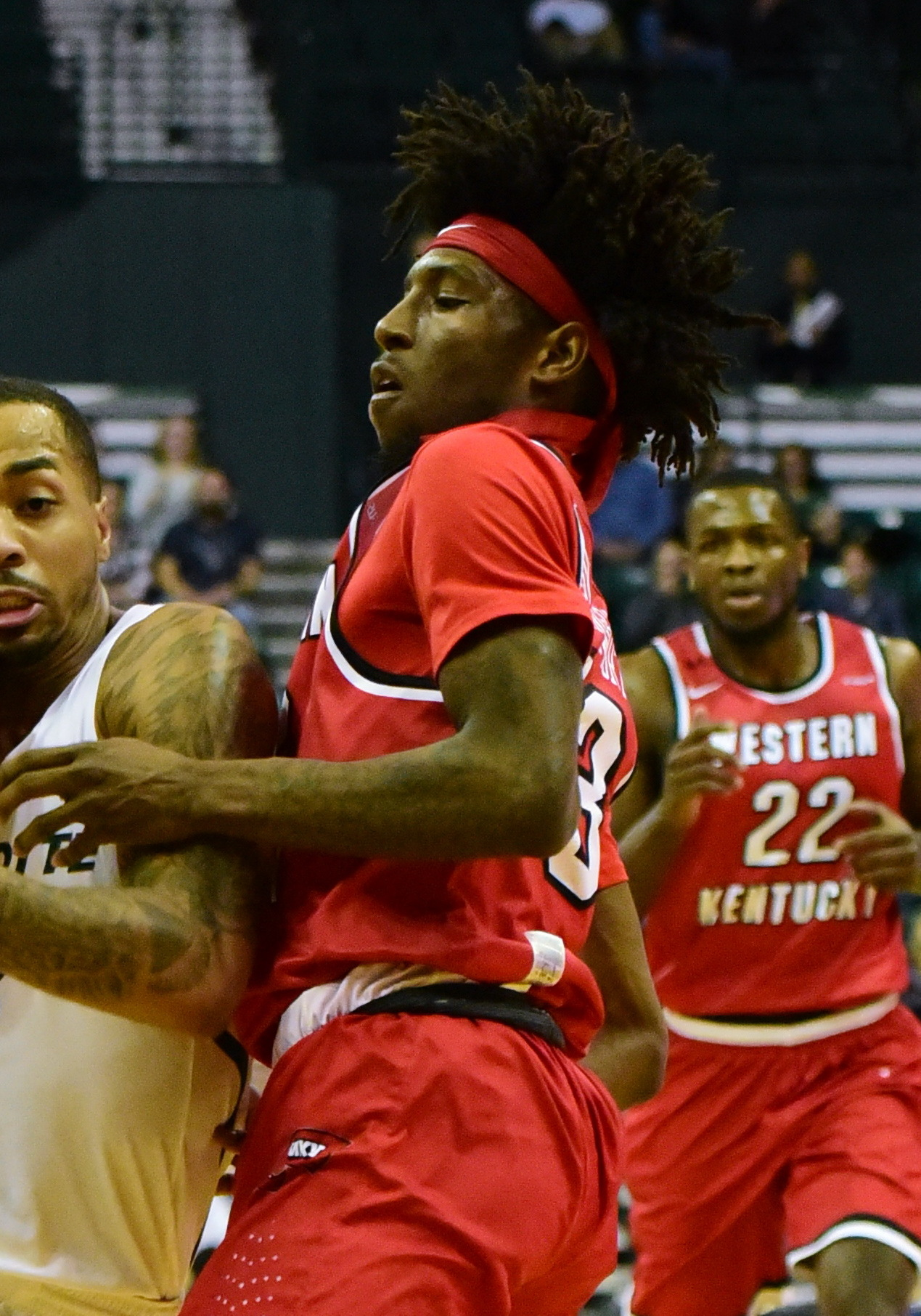
- Hollingsworth with Western Kentucky in 2018

No. 11 – AEK Larnaca
- Position: Point guard
- League: Cypriot League

Personal information
- Born: August 14, 1999 (age 27) Pontiac, Michigan, U.S.
- Listed height: 6 ft 2 in (1.88 m)
- Listed weight: 165 lb (75 kg)

Career information
- High school: Paul Laurence Dunbar (Lexington, Kentucky)
- College: Western Kentucky (2017–2021)
- NBA draft: 2021: undrafted
- Playing career: 2021–present

Career history
- 2021–2022: Traiskirchen Lions
- 2022–2023: KK Dubrava
- 2023–present: AEK Larnaca

Career highlights
- Cypriot League champion (2023, 2025); Cypriot Cup winner (2023); Cypriot Super Cup winner (2025); Cypriot Super Cup MVP (2025); Cypriot League All-Star (2023); First-team All-Conference USA (2020); Second-team All-Conference USA (2021); Third-team All-Conference USA (2019); Conference USA All-Freshman Team (2018); Kentucky Mr. Basketball (2017)

Taveion Hollingsworth (born August 14, 1999) is an American professional basketball player for AEK Larnaca of the Cypriot League. He played college basketball for the Western Kentucky Hilltoppers.

== Early life and high school career ==
Hollingsworth grew up in Pontiac, Michigan and started playing basketball at age six. In second grade, he moved with his family to Lexington, Kentucky. He attended Paul Laurence Dunbar High School in Lexington. As a junior, he led his team to its first state championship, scoring 20 points in the title game and earning tournament most valuable player honors. Hollingsworth averaged 28.3 points, 6.8 rebounds, 3.9 assists and 3.1 steals per game as senior. He was named Kentucky Mr. Basketball and Kentucky Gatorade Player of the Year. A three-star recruit, he committed to playing college basketball for Western Kentucky over an offer from UAB. He had also received a conditional scholarship offer from Kentucky.

== College career ==
On February 15, 2018, Hollingsworth scored a freshman season-high 30 points, the most by a Western Kentucky freshman since 1955, and grabbed seven rebounds in a 102–94 overtime win over North Texas. On March 21, he scored 30 points for a second time with eight rebounds in a 92–84 quarterfinal win over Oklahoma State at the 2018 National Invitation Tournament. As a freshman, Hollingsworth averaged 13.3 points, 3.4 rebounds and 1.9 assists per game despite playing several games with a broken nose. He earned Conference USA All-Freshman Team honors and surpassed Courtney Lee for Western Kentucky's freshman scoring record. Hollingsworth was suspended from an exhibition game prior to his sophomore season for a violation of team rules, after being cited for marijuana possession. As a sophomore, he averaged 14.4 points, 4.4 rebounds and 2.2 assists per game. He was named to the Third Team All-Conference USA as well as the All-Tournament Team.

On February 27, 2020, Hollingsworth posted a career-high 43 points, six rebounds and three assists in a 95–91 overtime win over Louisiana Tech. He scored the most single-game points by a Western Kentucky player since Jim McDaniels in 1971. Five days later, he was named Oscar Robertson National Player of the Week. As a junior, Hollingsworth averaged 16.6 points, 4.2 rebounds and 2.7 assists per game, earning First Team All-Conference USA honors. He averaged 13.9 points, 3.8 rebounds and 2.4 assists per game as a senior and was named to the Second Team All-Conference USA. Hollingsworth announced he was turning professional rather than use the fifth year of eligibility granted due to the COVID-19 pandemic. He finished his career fifth on Western Kentucky's all-time scoring list with 1,896 points, set the school record with 131 games started, and ranked in the top 10 in career steals, free throws made, free throws attempted and free-throw percentage.

== Professional career ==
On August 6, 2021, Hollingsworth signed his first professional contract with the Traiskirchen Lions of the Austrian Basketball Superliga. He subsequently joined KK Dubrava of the Croatian league and averaged 19.2 points, 6.2 rebounds, and 3.5 assists per game. On February 23, 2023, Hollingsworth signed with AEK Larnaca B.C. of the Cyprus Basketball Division A.

== Career statistics ==
Legend
GP	Games played	GS	Games started	MPG	Minutes per game
FG%	Field goal percentage	3P%	3-point field goal percentage	FT%	Free throw percentage
RPG	Rebounds per game	APG	Assists per game	SPG	Steals per game
BPG	Blocks per game	PPG	Points per game	**Bold**	Career high

=== College ===
Year	Team	GP	GS	MPG	FG%	3P%	FT%	RPG	APG	SPG	BPG	PPG
2017–18	Western Kentucky	**38**	**37**	34.5	**.480**	**.378**	.791	3.4	1.9	1.0	.1	13.3
2018–19	Western Kentucky	34	34	**36.8**	.418	.318	.771	**4.4**	2.2	1.2	**.2**	14.4
2019–20	Western Kentucky	30	30	34.9	.471	.308	.843	4.2	**2.7**	**1.3**	.1	**16.6**
2020–21	Western Kentucky	29	29	31.4	.421	.329	**.859**	3.8	2.4	1.2	**.2**	13.9
Career		131	130	34.5	.447	.336	.818	3.9	2.3	1.2	.2	14.5

== Personal life ==
Hollingsworth is the son of Kathy Sweatt and Maurice Hollingsworth. Both of his parents were standout basketball players at Harlan High School in Harlan, Kentucky. He has a daughter, Aubrey, who was born in 2017.
