= Nikola Kuga =

Serbian professional basketball player (born 1986)

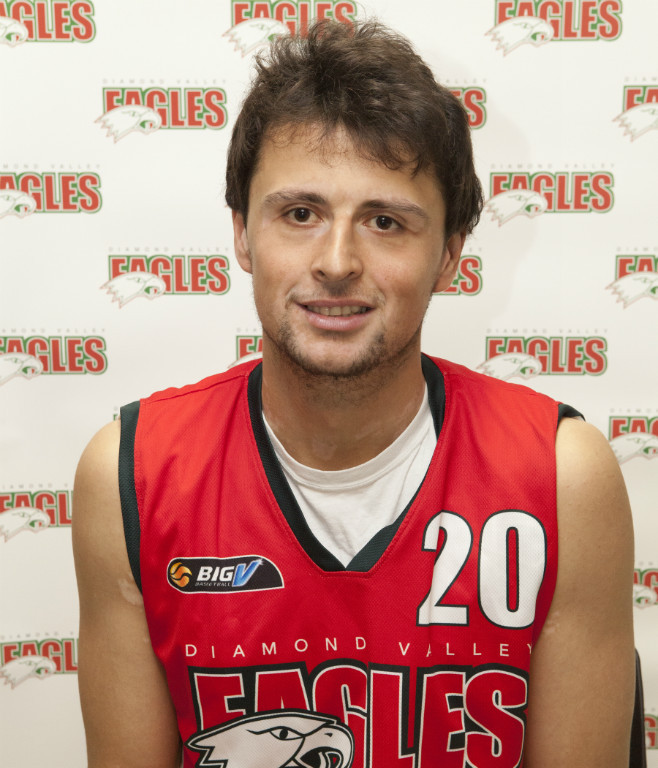
- Kuga with the Diamond Valley Eagles in 2015

Personal information
- Born: October 13, 1986 (age 40) Bihać, SR Bosnia and Herzegovina, SFR Yugoslavia
- Listed height: 2.00 m (6 ft 7 in)
- Listed weight: 94 kg (207 lb)

Career information
- Playing career: 2005–2019
- Position: Small forward / shooting guard

Career history
- 2005–2007: FMP Železnik
- 2007–2008: KK Srem
- 2008: Sport Plazza Casablanca
- 2008–2009: Hopsi Pozella
- 2010: Skallagrímur
- 2011: R.L.C Maldeves
- 2011–2012: Norte de Santander
- 2012: Al Sarjah
- 2013–2014: BBG Herford
- 2014: Laskar DREYA South Sumatra
- 2014–2015: Talina Kalev
- 2015: Umea
- 2015–2016: Diamond Valley Eagles
- 2016: Al Moutahed
- 2016–2017: BC Alfenense
- 2017–2018: Al Moutahed
- 2018–2019: Ammerud Basket
- 2019: Rot-Weiss Cuxhaven

Nikola Kuga (Serbian Cyrillic: Николa Kуга; born October 13, 1986 ) is a Serbian professional basketball player. Standing at 2.00 m (6 ft 7 in), he plays the small forward position.

== Professional career ==
Nikola grew up in the famous basketball school of FMP Belgrade, he played for youth teams of FMP from 2005 to 2007. In the 2007–08 season, he played for KK Srem.

In Sempteber 2008, Kuga signed a one-year deal with Sport Plazza Casablanca (Morocco). In 2009–10 season, he played for Hopsi Pozela. From 2010 to 2015, he has played for several European basketball teams including U.M.F. Skallagrímur (Iceland), Tallina Kalev (Estonia), Umea (Sweden), BBG Herford (Germany).

Outside Europe, he has suited up for a number of the teams such as Al Moutahed (Lebanon), Al Sarjah (UAE), R.L.C (Maldeves).

Inn 2010, Kuga signed with Skallagrímur in the Icelandic 1. deild karla. In four games, he averaged 12.3 points and 7.0 rebounds per game before leaving the club in November 2010.

In 2011, Kuga signed with Cucuta Norte, a professional basketball club based in Cucuta, Colombia. He became the first Serbian and first player from Eastern Europe to play in the Colombian league (LNB – Colombia). Over 24 league games Kuga averaged 15.3 points, 5.4 rebounds and 3.0 assists per game.

In August 2014, Laskar Dreya South Sumatra team announced that Kuga will play for Laskar Dreaya in ASEAN Basketball League. He has become first European player who got chance to Play ABL. On April 1, 2015, he signed for Diamond Valley Eagles and Australia become his 5th continent where he played.

In January 2016, Kuga signed a contract with Lebanese team Al Moutahed for the rest of the following season.

During 2016-2017, Kuga played for Portuguese team BC Alfenense. Currently Kuga is member of Norvegian basketball team Ammerud Basket
