= Vukašin Mandić =

Serbian basketball player

Personal information
- Born: June 7, 1982 (age 44) Vršac, SFR Yugoslavia
- Listed height: 6 ft 7 in (2.01 m)
- Listed weight: 210 lb (95 kg)

Career information
- Playing career: 2001–present
- Position: Forward

Career history
- 2001–2005: FMP
- 2005: Borac Čačak
- 2005: Crvena zvezda
- 2005–2006: Hapoel Galil Elyon
- 2006–2007: Zlatorog Laško
- 2007: Radnički KG
- 2007–2009: M.E.N.T. B.C.
- 2009–2010: Ermis Lagkada Drop
- 2010–2011: AEK Athens
- 2011: Apoel Nicosia
- 2012–2013: Asesoft Ploiești
- 2013: Solna Vikings
- 2013–2016: Kumanovo
- 2016–2018: Near East University B.C.
- 2018–2019: Yakin Dogu Universitesi Lefke
- 2019: Koop Spor Nicosia

Career highlights
- ABA League (2004); Serbian Cup champion (2003)

Vukašin Mandić (born June 7, 1982, in Vršac) is a former Serbian professional basketball player,

== Honors ==
- Club honors
  - Serbian Cup - champion (2005) with FMP
