= AEK Larnaca B.C. =

Cypriot professional basketball club

AEK Larnaca
- Nickname: The green yellows
- Leagues: Cypriot Division A, Cypriot Cup; Europe Cup
- Founded: 1994; 32 years ago
- Arena: Kition Athletic Center
- Capacity: 3,000
- Location: Larnaca, Cyprus
- Team colors: Green and Yellow
- President: Vasilis Sellas
- Head coach: Christophoros Livadiotis
- Championships: 7 Cypriot Championships; 4 Cypriot Cups; 5 Cypriot Super Cup
- Website: www.aek.com.cy
Home	Away

Petrolina AEK Larnaca B.C. (in Greek: ΑΕΚ Λάρνακας), is a Cypriot professional basketball club based in Larnaca, Cyprus. The club competes in the Cypriot Basketball League. The president of the team is Vasilis Sellas and the current head coach is Christophoros Livadiotis.

== History ==
AEK Larnaca B.C. was formed in 1994 after a merger of two Larnaca clubs: EPA Larnaca and Pezoporikos. The team has many participations in the Cyprus Basketball Division A but had also relegated to the second division. Before the merger of the two teams, Pezoporikos won the championship four times (1973, 1991, 1992, 1994). As AEK the team has won the two titles of the second division. In 2013, the team achieved its first Championship as AEK, after beating APOEL in the finals by 3–1.

== Season by season ==
Season	Tier	League	Pos.	Cypriot Cup	European competitions	
1998–99	1	Division A	8th			
1999–00	1	Division A	9th			
2000–01	1	Division A	5th			
2001–02	1	Division A	5th		3 Korać Cup	1R
2002–03	2	Division B	10th			
2003–04	2	Division B	10th			
2004–05	2	Division B	1st			
2005–06	1	Division A	8th			
2006–07	2	Division B	1st			
2007–08	1	Division A	6th			
2008–09	1	Division A	6th			
2009–10	1	Division A	7th			
2010–11	1	Division A	7th			
2011–12	1	Division A	4th			
2012–13	1	Division A	1st			
2013–14	1	Division A	2nd			
2014–15	1	Division A	1st			
2015–16	1	Division A	1st	Runner-up	3 FIBA Europe Cup	R32
2016–17	1	Division A	2nd	Champion	3 Champions League	QR1
2016–17	1	Division A	2nd	Champion	4 FIBA Europe Cup	RS
2017–18	1	Division A	1st	Champion	4 FIBA Europe Cup	QR2
2018–19	1	Division A	2nd	Runner-up	3 Champions League	QR1
2018–19	1	Division A	2nd	Runner-up	4 FIBA Europe Cup	2R
2019–20	1	Division A	2nd (Note: Due to the coronavirus pandemic, the league was suspended on 17 March 2020.)	Cancelled		
2020–21	1	Division A	1st	Champion		
2021–22	1	Division A	2nd		3 Champions League	QR1
2022–23	1	Division A	1st	Champion	4 FIBA Europe Cup	QR2
2023–24	1	Division A	2nd	Runner-up	3 Champions League	2QR
2023–24	1	Division A	2nd	Runner-up	4 FIBA Europe Cup	RS
2024–25	1	Division A	1st		4 FIBA Europe Cup	RS
2025–26	1	Division A		Semifinals	3 Champions League	1QR
2025–26	1	Division A		Semifinals	4 FIBA Europe Cup	RS

== Honours ==
=== League achievements ===
==== Cyprus First Division ====
- Champions (8): 2012–13, 2014–15, 2015–16, 2017–18, 2020–21, 2022–23, 2024–25, 2025-26
- Runners-up (6): 1994–95, 2013–14, 2016–17, 2018–19, 2021–22, 2023–24

==== Cyprus Second Division ====
- Champions (2): 2004–05, 2006–07

==== Cyprus Cup ====
- Winners (4): 2016–17, 2017–18, 2020–21, 2022–23
- Runners-up (3): 2015–16, 2018–19, 2023–24

==== Cypriot Super Cup ====
- Winners (6): 2013, 2015, 2016, 2017, 2023, 2025
- Runners-up (5): 1994, 2018, 2019, 2021, 2024

==== Cyprus Cup B Division ====
- Winners (2): 2004–05, 2006–07

=== International tournaments ===
==== Mavroskoufia Basketball Tournament ====
- Winners (1): 2025

== Roster ==
Note: Flags indicate national team eligibility at FIBA-sanctioned events. Players may hold other non-FIBA nationalities not displayed.

Petrolina AEK Larnaca roster
Players
Coaches

Pos.	No.	Nat.	Name	Ht.	Age
PG	0	(United States) (Cyprus)	Diggs, Jamar	1.90 m (6 ft 3 in)	37 – 27 November 1988
G	1	(United States)	Hollingsworth, Taveion	1.88 m (6 ft 2 in)	28 – 14 August 1998
SF	2	(United States)	Mucius, Isaiah	2.02 m (6 ft 8 in)	27 – 22 April 1999
G	5	(Cyprus)	Giannaras, Ioannis	1.85 m (6 ft 1 in)	27 – 27 March 1999
PG	6	(Cyprus) (Greece)	Varsos, Georgios	1.85 m (6 ft 1 in)	27 – 29 January 1999
SG	11	(United States)	Durham, Anthony	1.91 m (6 ft 3 in)	32 – 6 August 1994
PG	12	(United States)	Tate, Myles	1.83 m (6 ft 0 in)	24 – 21 March 2002
G	16	(Greece) (Cyprus)	Ntoklis, Themistoklis	1.80 m (5 ft 11 in)	18 – 11 March 2008
C	19	(Cyprus)	Savva, Charalambos	2.05 m (6 ft 9 in)	22 – 19 January 2004
SG	22	(Cyprus)	Markou, Panagiotis	1.92 m (6 ft 4 in)	30 – 1 February 1996
PF	24	(United States)	McKinnis, Jayveous	2.01 m (6 ft 7 in)	27 – 19 August 1999
F	34	(Australia)	Hunt, Jesse	2.03 m (6 ft 8 in)	29 – 30 July 1997
PG	44	(Cyprus)	Panteli, Iakovos (C)	1.85 m (6 ft 1 in)	41 – 3 October 1985
SF		(Cyprus) (United States)	Pavlidis, Panayotis	2.03 m (6 ft 8 in)	26 – 30 September 2000

Head coach

- (Cyprus) Nikolas Papadopoulos

Assistant coach(es)

- (Cyprus) Stylianos Gregoriou

Strength & conditioning coach(es)

- (Cyprus) Christos Skarparis

Legend

- (C) Team captain
- Injured

- Roster
Updated: 27 March 2022

== Notable players ==
Note: Flags indicate national team eligibility at FIBA-sanctioned events. Players may hold other non-FIBA nationalities not displayed.

Criteria

To appear in this section a player must have either:

- Set a club record or won an individual award while at the club
- Played at least one official international match for their national team at any time
- Played at least one official NBA match at any time.
