= Mesa Geitonia =

Mesa Geitonia Μέσα Γειτονιά (Greek)
- Municipal District
- Flag Seal
- Interactive map of Mesa Geitonia
- Location within Cyprus Location within the Eastern Mediterranean Location within the European Union Location within Asia
- Coordinates: 34°42′08″N 33°02′43″E
- Country: Cyprus
- District: Limassol District
- Urban area: Limassol

Government
  - Deputy Mayor: Marios Protopapas

Area
  - Municipality: 3.61 km^{2} (1.39 sq mi)

Population (2011)
  - Municipality: 14,477
  - Density: 4,010/km^{2} (10,400/sq mi)
- Website: Mesa Yitonia Municipality

Mesa Geitonia (Greek: Μέσα Γειτονιά) is a municipal district within the Limassol Municipality of Cyprus, located in the Limassol District, 2 km north of the city center. It was established in 1986. Covering 370.71 hectares, it is the smallest municipality in Cyprus in area.

== History ==
The ancient settlement of Mesa Geitonia was likely established during the Byzantine period (330–1191). However, due to various factors such as earthquakes, wars, and Arab raids, the settlement was destroyed. The only remaining structure from this period is a medieval cistern. During the periods of Frankish and Venetian rule, Mesa Geitonia was a feudal estate.

In the wider area of Mesa Geitonia, rock-cut tombs have been discovered containing artifacts from several historical periods, including the Archaic, Classical, Hellenistic, and Roman eras.

Under Ottoman rule, Mesa Geitonia, like all Cypriot villages, was administered by a mukhtar (village head). This system largely continued under British rule, with some modifications. In 1950, the Law on Improvement Councils was enacted, and Mesa Geitonia was declared an Improvement Council in 1962, following Cyprus' independence, due to population growth.

The population continued to increase over the following decades, leading to a referendum on 23 February 1986 to declare Mesa Geitonia a municipality. The referendum was successful, and on 26 May 1986, local government elections were held in Cyprus. Mesa Geitonia elected its first municipal council.

== Population ==
According to the population censuses carried out in Cyprus, the village's population remained small until 1960. This was largely due to the poor condition of the roads, which left Mesa Geitonia isolated from Limassol. It was only in 1928 that the village was connected by a bridge to the neighboring village of Agios Athanasios. After 1960, the population increased as Mesa Geitonia received the wave of urban migration: residents from mountainous regions relocating to areas closer to the city.
