= Cyprus Basketball Division A =

Basketball league

- Founded: 1966; 60 years ago
- First season: 1966–67
- Country: Cyprus
- Confederation: FIBA Europe
- Number of teams: 10
- Relegation to: Cyprus Basketball Division B
- Domestic cup: Cypriot Cup
- Supercup: Cypriot Super Cup
- International cup(s): Basketball Champions League; FIBA Europe Cup
- Current champions: AEK Larnaca (8th title)
- Most championships: AEL Limassol (13 titles)
- Website: www.cbf.basketball
- 2025–26 Cyprus Basketball Division A

The Cyprus Basketball Division A, known for sponsorship reasons as ECOMMBX Basket League, is currently the top-tier level men's professional basketball competition of the Cypriot basketball league system. It is run and governed by the Cyprus Basketball Federation.

== Format ==
All teams play against each other during the first part of the league, with the top 4 teams reaching the play-off semi-finals stage. One team (the last one) at the end of the season is relegated to the second division, whilst one team from the second division is promoted.

The play-off semi-finals and the championship winner will be decided after three wins. The championship winner, along with the winners of the Cypriot Cup, will qualify to compete in the next season's FIBA's European-wide continental competitions.

== Teams and locations ==
The following ten teams (in alphabetical order) compete in ECOMMBX Basket League:

Locations of the 2025–26 Cyprus Basketball Division A teams

Team	City	Venue
Achilleas	Nicosia	Pallouriotissas Lyceum Arena
AEK	Larnaca	Kition Athletic Center
AEL	Limassol	Nicos Solomonides Arena
Anorthosis	Famagusta	Spyros Kyprianou Arena
APOEL	Nicosia	Lefkotheo
Apollon	Limassol	Apollon Arena
Digenis	Morfou	Lefkotheo
ETHA	Engomi	Eleftheria Indoor Hall
Keravnos	Strovolos	Costas Papaellinas Arena
Paralimni	Paralimni	Paralimni Arena

== Champions ==
- 1965–66: suspended
- 1966–67: Digenis
- 1967–68: Digenis
- 1968–69: ENAD
- 1969–70: PAEEK
- 1970–71: PAEEK
- 1971–72: PAEEK
- 1972–73: Pezoporikos
- 1973–74: AEL
- 1974–75: Achilleas
- 1975–76: APOEL
- 1976–77: Achilleas
- 1977–78: AEL
- 1978–79: APOEL
- 1979–80: AEL
- 1980–81: APOEL
- 1981–82: AEL
- 1982–83: AEL
- 1983–84: Achilleas
- 1984–85: AEL
- 1985–86: Achilleas
- 1986–87: AEL
- 1987–88: AEL
- 1988–89: Keravnos
- 1989–90: ENAD
- 1990–91: Pezoporikos
- 1991–92: Pezoporikos
- 1992–93: Achilleas
- 1993–94: Pezoporikos
- 1994–95: APOEL
- 1995–96: APOEL
- 1996–97: Keravnos
- 1997–98: APOEL
- 1998–99: APOEL
- 1999–00: Keravnos
- 2000–01: Keravnos
- 2001–02: APOEL
- 2002–03: AEL
- 2003–04: AEL
- 2004–05: AEL
- 2005–06: AEL
- 2006–07: AEL
- 2007–08: Keravnos
- 2008–09: APOEL
- 2009–10: APOEL
- 2010–11: ETHA
- 2011–12: ETHA
- 2012–13: AEK
- 2013–14: APOEL
- 2014–15: AEK
- 2015–16: AEK
- 2016–17: Keravnos
- 2017–18: AEK
- 2018–19: Keravnos
- 2019–20: suspended
- 2020–21: AEK
- 2021–22: Keravnos
- 2022–23: AEK
- 2023–24: Keravnos
- 2024–25: AEK
- 2025–26: AEK

== Finals ==
Yellow: Team with Home court disadvantage.

Season	Champion	Runner-up	Score
1983–84	Achilleas	Keravnos	2–1
1984–85	AEL	APOEL	3–1
1985–86	Achilleas	APOEL	3–2
1986–87	AEL	Achilleas	3–0
1987–88	AEL	APOEL	4–0
1988–89	Keravnos	Achilleas	4–3
1989–90	ENAD	Achilleas	4–1
1990–91	Pezoporikos	APOEL	4–1
1991–92	Pezoporikos	Achilleas	4–3
1992–93	Achilleas	APOEL	4–0
1993–94	Pezoporikos	APOEL	4–3
1994–95	APOEL	AEK	4–2
1995–96	APOEL	Keravnos	4–0
1996–97	Keravnos	Achilleas	4–1
1997–98	APOEL	Keravnos	4–3
1998–99	APOEL	Achilleas	4–0
1999–00	Keravnos	Apollon	3–1

Season	Champion	Runner-up	Score
2000–01	Keravnos	Apollon	3–0
2001–02	APOEL	Keravnos	3–1
2002–03	AEL	Keravnos	3–2
2003–04	AEL	Keravnos	3–1
2004–05	AEL	Apollon	3–0
2005–06	AEL	Apollon	3–0
2006–07	AEL	APOEL	3–2
2007–08	Keravnos	APOEL	3–2
2008–09	APOEL	Keravnos	3–1
2009–10	APOEL	AEL	3–1
2010–11	ETHA	AEL	3–2
2011–12	ETHA	Keravnos	3–1
2012–13	AEK	APOEL	3–1
2013–14	APOEL	AEK	3–2
2014–15	AEK	APOEL	3–1
2015–16	AEK	APOEL	3–0
2016–17	Keravnos	AEK	3–1

Season	Champion	Runner-up	Score
2017–18	AEK	Keravnos	3–0
2018–19	Keravnos	AEK	3–1
2020–21	AEK	Keravnos	3-2
2021–22	Keravnos	AEK	3–2
2022–23	AEK	Keravnos	3–2
2023–24	Keravnos	AEK	3–2
2024–25	AEK	Keravnos	3–0
2025–26	AEK	Keravnos	3–2

== Performance by club ==
Team	Titles	Years won
AEL	13	1974, 1978, 1980, 1982, 1983, 1985, 1987, 1988, 2003, 2004, 2005, 2006, 2007
APOEL	11	1976, 1979, 1981, 1995, 1996, 1998, 1999, 2002, 2009, 2010, 2014
Keravnos	9	1989, 1997, 2000, 2001, 2008, 2017, 2019, 2022, 2024
AEK	8	2013, 2015, 2016, 2018, 2021, 2023, 2025, 2026
Achilleas	5	1975, 1977, 1984, 1986, 1993
Pezoporikos	4	1973, 1991, 1992, 1994
PAEEK	3	1970, 1971, 1972
ETHA	2	2011, 2012
ENAD	2	1969, 1990
Digenis	2	1967, 1968

== Stats leaders ==
Source:eurobasket.com

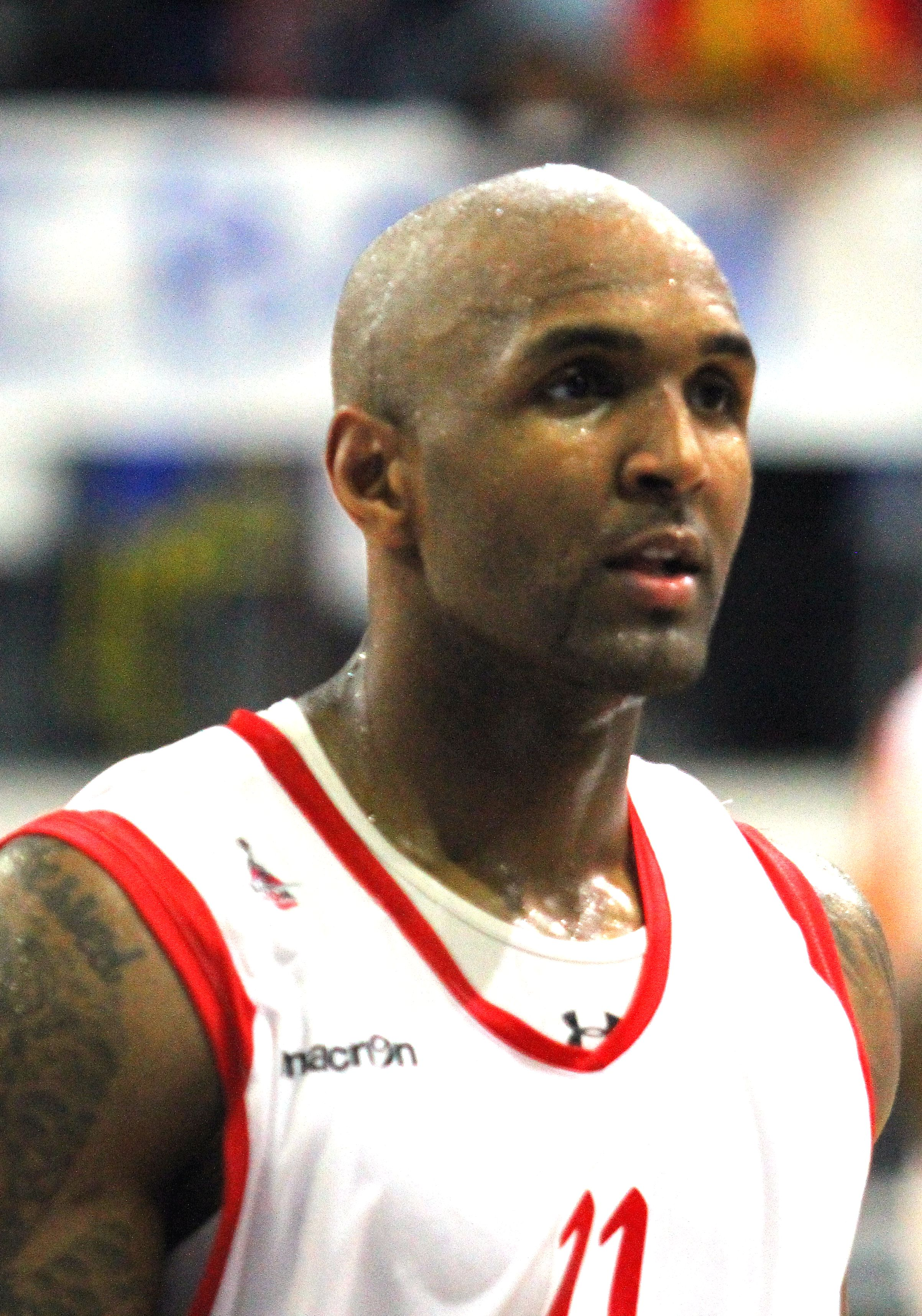
Tony Weeden was the league's top scorer in 2014–15.

=== Topscorers ===
Season	Player	Team	PPG
1986–87	(Cyprus) Takis Mirallais	Achilleas Kaimakli	
1987–88	(Cyprus) Christos Stylianides	ENAD	
1988–89	(United States) Ted Wilcox	Pezoporikos	35.3 (Note: Ted Wilcox was 6th scorer in Europe in 1988–89.)
1992–93	(United States) (Mexico) William Stephan Spider Ledesma	Achilleas Kaimakli	31.5
1993–94	(United States) Darrell Armstrong	Pezoporikos	480 (Note: Armstrong scored 480 pts in regular season and other 390 pts in second stage, the Final-6.)
1995–96	(United States) (Mexico) William Stephan Spider Ledesma	Achilleas Kaimakli	35.8
1997–98	(United States) Mark King	ETHA	
2003–04	(United States) Albert Mouring	Apollon Limassol	28.9
2004–05	(United States) Mike Jones	Digenis Akritas Morphou	24.3
			Points
2005–06	(United States) Wykeen Kelly	Apollon Limassol	341
2006–07	(United States) Jonathan Jones	Omonia B.C.	241
			PPG
2007–08	(United States) Robert Davis	Omonia B.C.	18.0
2008–09	(United States) (Spain) Lewis Sims	Apollon Limassol	19.4
2010–11	(United States) (Puerto Rico) Joel Jones	Apollon Limassol	17.7
2011–12	(Cyprus) Giorgos Palalas	AEL Limassol	19.8
2012–13	(United States) Brandon Brown	Apollon Limassol	20.1
2013–14	(United States) (Georgia (country)) Thad McFadden	APOEL B.C.	17.0
2014–15	(United States) Tony Weeden	Keravnos	18.4
2015–16	(United States) Lamont Middleton	Anagennisi Germasogeias	33.0
2016–17	(United States) Baden Jaxen	ETHA Engomis	21.9
2017–18	(United States) Anthony Hickey	Enosis Neon Paralimni	18.8
2018–19	(United States) Deondre Parks	AEL Limassol	18.8
2019–20	(United States) David Nichols	Omonia B.C.	23.8
2020–21	(United States) Courtney Pigram	APOP Paphos	22.5
2021–22	(United States) DeAngelo Riley	AEL Limassol	25.1
2022–23	(United States) Malik Curry	ETHA Engomis	26.9
2023–24	(United States) New Williams	Apollon Limassol	26.4
2024–25	(United States) Jonathan Cisse	Apollon Limassol	27.0
2025–26	(United States) Zid Powell	ETHA Engomis	26.9

=== Rebounds ===
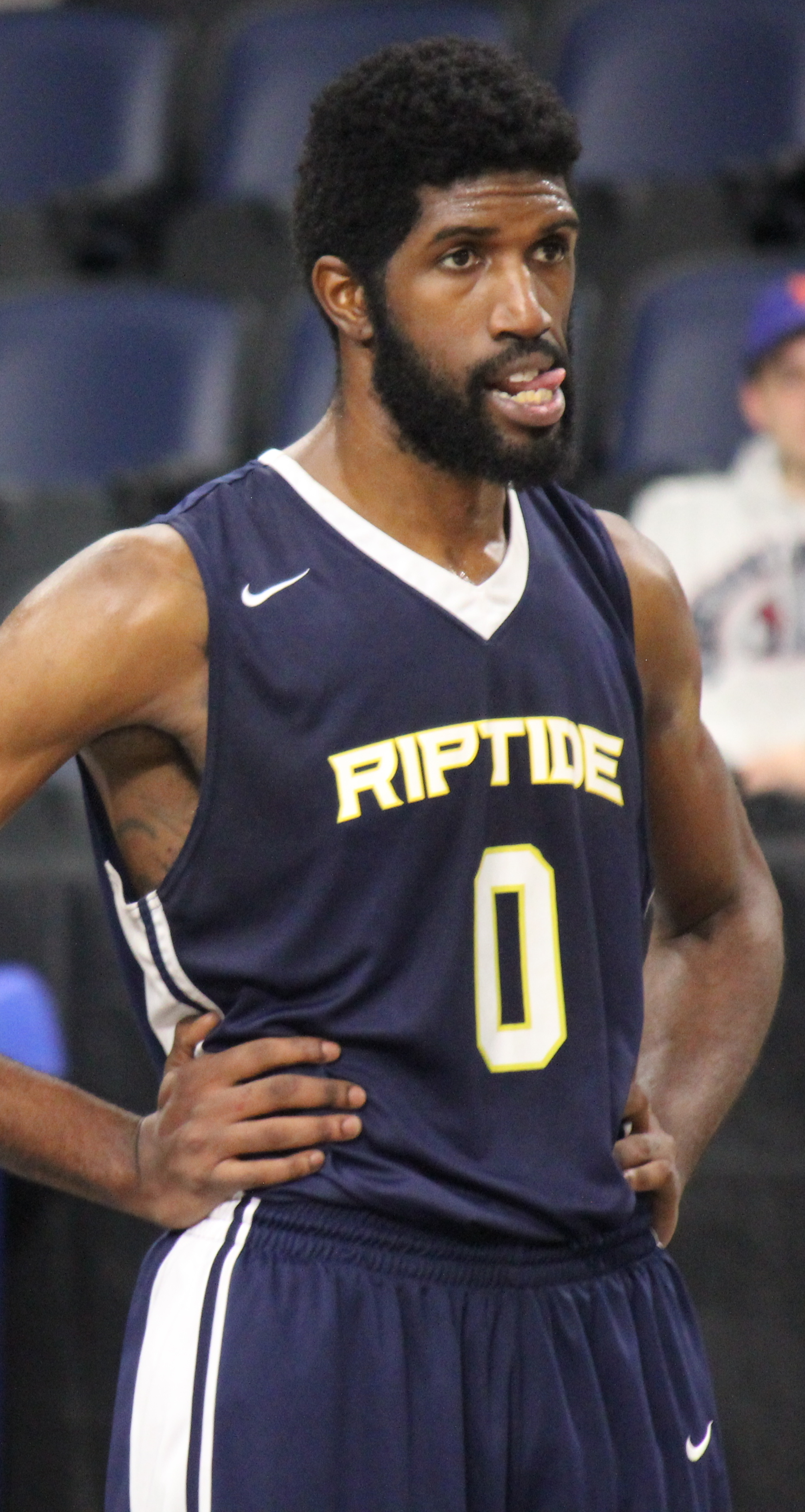
Anthony Stover was the league's top rebounder in 2019–20.

Season	Player	Team	RPG
2003–04	(United States) Lee Benson	APOEL B.C.	11.7
2004–05	(United States) Kenny Whitehead	ENAD	24.3
			Rebounds
2005–06	(Cyprus) Panagiotis Trisokkas	Keravnos	126
2006–07	(United States) Jonathan Jones	Omonia B.C.	155
			RPG
2007–08	(Cyprus) Panagiotis Trisokkas	Keravnos	9.7
2008–09	(Cyprus) Panagiotis Trisokkas (3)	Keravnos	9.5
2010–11	(Serbia) Savo Djikanovic	Achilleas Kaimakli	9.3
2011–12	(United States) Joseph Roundy	AEK Larnaca B.C.	7.6
2012–13	(Serbia) Mihajlo Pesic	AEL Limassol	8.6
2013–14	(Czech Republic) Michal Kremen	APOEL B.C.	8.4
2014–15	(United States) Trey Britton	Omonia B.C.	10.2
2015–16	(Lithuania) Edvardas Vetrenka	Anagennisi Germasogeias	13.3
2016–17	(United States) Terell Parks	Keravnos	8.5
2017–18	(Italy) (Nigeria) Peter Olisemeka	Apollon Limassol	10.3
2018–19	(United States) Cameron Naylor	Apollon Limassol	10.1
2019–20	(United States) Anthony Stover	APOP Paphos	11.3
2020–21	(United States) Jeff Allen	Apollon Limassol	13.3
2021–22	(United States) Nathan Krill	Omonia B.C.	13.5
2022–23	(United States) (Nigeria) Stephen Chukwuemeka	Enosis Neon Paralimni	12.3
2023–24	(United States) Jayveous McKinnis	APOEL B.C.	13.3
2024–25	(Serbia) Dusan Mahorcic	Enosis Neon Paralimni	13.0
2025–26	(United States) Ahmir Langlais	ETHA Engomis	13.2

=== Assists ===
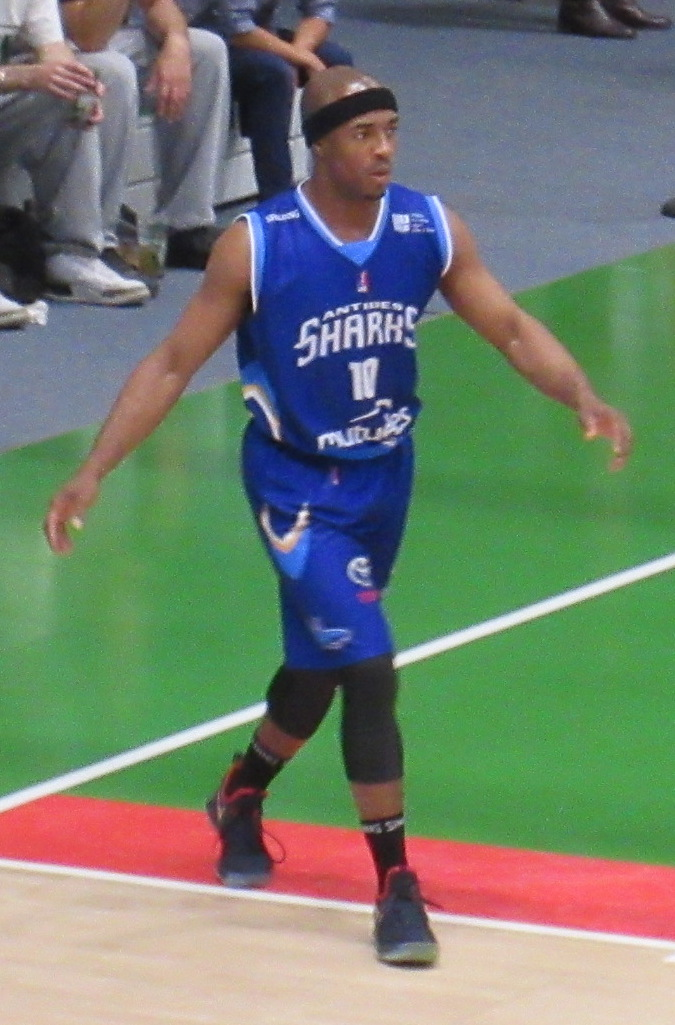
Jerel Blassingame was the league's top assister in 2005–06.

Season	Player	Team	APG
2003–04	(United States) Curtis Haywood (United States) Duane Woodward	ETHA Engomis; AEL Limassol	4.3
2004–05	(Cyprus) Giorgos Palalas	Apollon Limassol	4.6
			Assists
2005–06	(United States) Jerel Blassingame	ENAD	73
2006–07	(Croatia) Ivan Tomeljak	Apollon Limassol	62
			APG
2007–08	(United States) Patrick Lee	Keravnos	4.9
2008–09	(United States) Dwayne Foreman	ENAD	6.0
2010–11	(Puerto Rico) Miguel "Ali" Berdiel	AEK Larnaca B.C.	4.3
2011–12	(Cyprus) Nikos Papadopoulos	Omonia B.C.	4.3
2012–13	(Serbia) Milutin Aleksic	AEL Limassol	5.0
2013–14	(United States) Matt Bauscher	AEK Larnaca B.C.	5.0
2014–15	(Sweden) (Democratic Republic of the Congo) Thomas Massamba	ETHA Engomis	5.4
2015–16	(United States) Trae Golden	ETHA Engomis	7.1
2016–17	(United States) Kenny Barker	Keravnos	6.0
2017–18	(United States) Willie Kemp	APOEL B.C.	6.1
2018–19	(Lithuania) Dovydas Redikas	Apollon Limassol	6.4
2019–20	(United States) Josh Hagins	Keravnos	5.6
2020–21	(United States) TJ Washington	APOP Paphos	7.2
2021–22	(United States) Quentin Snider	AEK Larnaca B.C.	6.5
2022–23	(United States) Carlbe Ervin II	APOEL B.C.	6.4
2023–24	(United States) Ricky Clemons	ETHA Engomis	5.7
2024–25	(Canada) Shamar Givance	AEL Limassol	7.8
2025–26	(United States) Kenney Funderburk	APOEL B.C.	6.1
2025–26	(United States) Myles Tate	AEK Larnaca B.C.	6.1
2025–26	(United States) Zid Powell	ETHA Engomis	6.1

== Awards ==
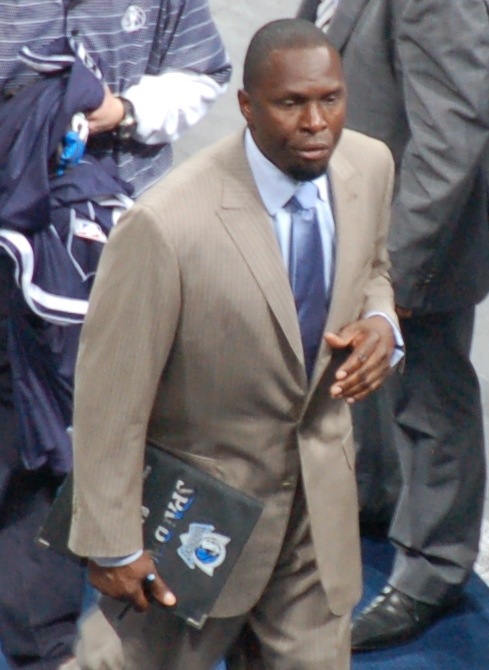
Former NBA player Darrell Armstrong was named the league's best player in 1994.

=== Player of the Year ===
Year	Player	Team
1977–78	(Cyprus) George Thyrotos	AEL Limassol
1979–80	(Cyprus) George Thyrotos	AEL Limassol
1980–81	(Cyprus) George Thyrotos	AEL Limassol
1984–85	(Cyprus) George Thyrotos (4)	AEL Limassol
1993–94	(United States) Darrell Armstrong	Pezoporikos
1995–96	(United States) (Mexico) William Stephan Spider Ledesma	Achilleas Kaimakli
2013–14	(Cyprus) Vasilis Kounas	APOEL B.C.
2022–23	(Cyprus) Iakovos Panteli	AEK Larnaca
2023–24	(Cyprus) Filippos Tigkas	Keravnos

=== Best Foreigner player ===
Year	Player	Team
1993–94	(United States) Darrell Armstrong	Pezoporikos
1995–96	(United States) (Mexico) William Stephan Spider Ledesma	Achilleas Kaimakli
1999–00	(United States) Mike Jones	Apollon Limassol

=== Best Cypriot player ===
Year	Player	Team
1973–74	(Cyprus) George Thyrotos	AEL Limassol
1993–94	(Cyprus) Christos Stylianides	Keravnos
1999-00	(Cyprus) Giorgos Anastasiades	Keravnos
2000–01	(Cyprus) Christos Stylianides	APOEL B.C.

=== Coach of the year ===
Year	Player	Team
1993–94	(United States) Johnny Neumann	Pezoporikos
1994–95	(United States) Johnny Neumann	AEK Larnaca
2013–14	(Cyprus) Panagiotis Yiannaras	Apollon Limassol

=== League MVP by Eurobasket.com ===
Year	Player	Team
2002-03	(United States) Duane Woodward	AEL Limassol
2003-04	(United States) Duane Woodward (2)	AEL Limassol
2004-05	(United States) Frankie King	AEL Limassol
2005-06	(United States) Jerel Blassingame	ENAD
2006-07	(Serbia) Milutin Aleksić	EKA AEL Limassol
2007-08	(Cyprus) Giorgos Anastasiades	Keravnos
2008-09	(United States) Lonnie Cooper	APOEL B.C.
2010-11	(United States) (Cyprus) Anthony King	ETHA Engomis
2011-12	(United States) Darryl Watkins	ETHA Engomis
2012-13	(United States) Charron Fisher	AEK Larnaca
2013-14	(United States) Jamar Diggs	APOEL B.C.
2014-15	(Sweden) (Democratic Republic of the Congo) Thomas Massamba	ETHA Engomis
2015-16	(United States) (Georgia (country)) Thad McFadden	AEK Larnaca
2016-17	(United States) Terell Parks	Keravnos
2017-18	(United States) Shane Gibson	AEK Larnaca
2018-19	(United States) (Cyprus) Darral Willis	Keravnos
2019-20	(United States) Josh Hagins	Keravnos
2020-21	(United States) Quentin Snider	AEK Larnaca
2021-22	(United States) Collin Malcolm	Keravnos
2022-23	(United States) (The Gambia) Ousman Krubally	Keravnos
2023-24	(United States) Jaye Crockett	Keravnos
2024-25	(United States) Tyrn Flowers	AEL Limassol
2025-26	(United States) Taveion Hollingsworth	AEK Larnaca

=== Finals Series MVP by Eurobasket.com ===
Year	Player	Team
2012–13	(United States) Dion Dixon	AEK Larnaca
2015–16	(United States) Tyreek Duren	AEK Larnaca
2017–18	(United States) Shane Gibson	AEK Larnaca
2018–19	(United States) (Cyprus) Anthony King	Keravnos
2021–22	(United States) Deondre Burns	Keravnos
2022–23	(United States) Taveion Hollingsworth	AEK Larnaca
2023–24	(United States) Shavar Reynolds Jr.	Keravnos
2024–25	(United States) Amir Bell	AEK Larnaca
2025–26	(United States) Taveion Hollingsworth (2)	AEK Larnaca

== Players ==
=== Notable players ===
Numerous well-known players have featured in the league throughout the years.

Cyprus and Greece

- (Cyprus) George Thyrotos
- (Cyprus) Andreas Kozakis
- (Cyprus) Christos Stylianides
- (Cyprus) Panagiotis Trisokkas
- (Cyprus) Michael Kounounis
- (Greece) Michalis Kakiouzis
- (Greece) Giorgos Diamantopoulos

Europe

- (Bulgaria) Sasho Vezenkov
- (Bulgaria) Emil Ionov
- (Bosnia and Herzegovina) Aleksandar Radojević
- (Bosnia and Herzegovina) Haris Mujezinović
- Primož Brezec
- (Serbia) (Cyprus) Vlado Lukic
- (Serbia) Milutin Aleksic
- (Serbia) (Cyprus) Dragan Raca
- (Serbia) (Montenegro) Velibor Radović
- (Israel) Guy Pnini
- (Croatia) Davor Pejčinović
- (Belarus) Alexander Koul

USA

- Darrell Armstrong
- Roy Tarpley
- (United States) Mike Jones
- Rodney Buford
- Don Ross
- William Ledesma
- Tom Sewell
- Duane Woodward
- Richard Rellford
- JoJo Garcia
- Frankie King
- Askia Jones
- Wayne Yearwood
- Melvin Cheatum
- John White
- J.J. Eubanks
- Lowell Hamilton
- Gerald Damon Williams
- Kevin Holmes
- Kevin Florent
- Jason Rowe
- Ed Stokes
- Lonnie Cooper
- Gary Leonard
- Rodney Monroe
- Tony Harris
- Kirk Baker
- Lucius Davis
- Glynn Blackwell
- Jerry Reynolds
- George Ackles
- Fred Sheppard
- Eddie Collins
- Priest Lauderdale
- Ira Newble
- Isaac Burton
- Rowan Barrett
- Byron Dinkins
- Bryant Smith
- David Bulter
- Scotty Thurman
- Darrin Fowlkes
- Marcus Webb

Rest of Americas

NBA players
Over the years, the league has featured players who played in the National Basketball Association (NBA) before or after their stint in the Cypriot League.

- Darrell Armstrong
- Roy Tarpley
- Richard Rellford
- Frankie King
- Tony Harris
- Gary Leonard
- Rodney Buford
- Tom Sewell
- Lance Blanks
- Marcus Webb
- (Bosnia and Herzegovina) Aleksandar Radojević
- Rodney Monroe
- Askia Jones
- Byron Dinkins
- Primož Brezec
- Priest Lauderdale
- Ed Stokes
- Jerry Reynolds

=== FIBA All-Stars ===
They were selected for the All-Star Day while playing in the League:

- (Serbia) Milutin Aleksic
- Michael McDonald
- Duane Woodward
- Igors Miglinieks (coach)
- (Serbia) (Cyprus) Dragan Raca (coach)
- Charles Barton (coach)

== Winning coaches ==
Head coach	Titles	Champion	Final Lost
(Cyprus) George Thyrotos	6	1982, 1983, 1985, 1987, (Note: As player-coach:1982, 1983, 1985, 1987) 1988, 1989
(Cyprus) Christoforos Leivadiotis	5	2017, 2019, 2023, 2025, 2026	2018, 2021
(Greece) Memos Ioannou	4	1998, 1999, 2000, 2001	2002
(Serbia) / (Cyprus) Dragan Raca	3	2003, 2004, 2005	2007
(Cyprus) Alekos Iakovides	3	1970, 1971, 1972 (Note: All as player-coach.)
(Cyprus) Takis Lyras	3	1975, 1977, 1993	1985, 1986
(Cyprus) Giorgos Solomonides	2	1967, 1968
(Greece) Michalis Kakiouzis	2	2022, 2024	2023, 2025
(Cyprus) Palladios Nikoalou	2	1969, 1976
(Cyprus) Nikos Papadopoulos	2	2013, 2021	2014, 2015
(Latvia) Igors Miglinieks	2	2006, 2007
(Cyprus) Antonis Toni Konstantinides	2	2012, 2014	2013
(Greece) Periklis Tavropoulos	2	1996, 2002	1997
(Greece) Vassilis Fragkias	1	2008	2009
(Greece) Nikos Pavlou	1	1995
(Cyprus) Nasos Panayiotou	1	1984
(Cyprus) Charis Papazoglou	-	2000	1998
(Cyprus) Lazaros Papadimitriou	1	1989
(Greece) Takis Mirallais	2	1990, 1993
(Greece) Sakis Laios	1	1997
(Greece) Ilias Armenis	1	2002
(Cyprus) Linos Gavriel	1	2016	2011, 2017
(Germany) / (Greece) Yannis Christopoulos	1	2010
(Cyprus) Christos Stylianides	1	2009
(Cyprus) Giorgos Ketselidis	1	2015
(Cyprus) Μichalis Nikolaides	1	1978
(United States) Garry White	1	1991
(United States) Johnny Neumann	1	1994	1995
(Cyprus) Dmitris Koukouris	1	2018	2019
(Greece) Giorgos Vovoras	-		2016
(Cyprus) Panagiotis Giannaras	-		2012
(Cyprus) Kyriakos Yiangoulis	-		2008
(Serbia) Miroslav Nikolic	-		2010
(Greece) (Netherlands) Giannis Ioannidis	-		2005, 2026
(Cyprus) Kokos Lambrou	-		1984

== Cyprus League teams honors in continental competitions ==
Team	Competition	Progress
AEL Limassol	FIBA Europe Regional Challenge Cup (South)	Winners; 2002-03
AEL Limassol	FIBA EuroCup	Third place 2007-08
AEL Limassol	FIBA EuroChallenge	Fourth place 2008-09
Keravnos	FIBA EuroChallenge	Runners-up; 2006-07
AEL Limassol	Balkan International Basketball League	Runners-up; 2023-24

== See also ==
- Cypriot Basketball Cup
- Cypriot Basketball Super Cup
- Cyprus Basketball All-Star Day
