= Achilleas Kaimakli =

Achilleas Kaimakli Αχιλλέας Καϊμακλίου
- Leagues: Cyprus Basketball Division A
- Founded: 1943; 83 years ago
- History: 1943 – present
- Arena: Gymnasium Palouriotissas (1000)
- Location: Nicosia, Cyprus
- Team colors: blue and white
- Head coach: Michalis Arvanitis
- Championships: 5 Cypriot Championships; 7 Cypriot Cups
- Website: www.achilleaskaimakliou.com
| Home | Away |

Achilleas (Αχιλλέας Καϊμακλίου) is a Cypriot basketball club founded in 1943, nowadays running basketball, volleyball and table tennis divisions. It has been a part of the community in the suburb of Kaimakli in Nicosia. The club is named after Achilles (Ἀχιλλεύς) a legendary figure of the Greek mythology.

== Basketball ==
The Men's basketball division was one of the founding clubs of the Cyprus Basketball Federation. In terms of trophies Achilleas has won the Cyprus Basketball League five times, making it the 3rd most successful team on the island to date behind EKA AEL and APOEL. Through their domestic successes they have represented the island in several European competitions such as the Korać Cup (in 1999 and 2001), the Saporta Cup in 2000 and the Euroleague (historically The European Champions Cup). Several of Achilleas' players have been selected for the men's Cyprus national basketball team.

The Women's basketball division competes in the Cyprus Women's Basketball League – First division. It has also represented Cyprus in European competitions.

Home games are played at the indoor Pallouriotisa Arena which only has a capacity for about 1,000 fans. The proximity of fans to the playing field has given it a reputation as an intimidating and tough home ground for away teams.

== Roster ==
Achilleas Kaimakliou Roster
Players
Coaches

| Pos. | Νο. | Nat. | Name | Ht. |
|---|---|---|---|---|
| G | 6 | (Cyprus) | Chimonas, Andreas | 1.85 m (6 ft 1 in) |
| G/F | 7 | (Cyprus) | Christoudias, Charis | 1.93 m (6 ft 4 in) |
| G | 12 | (Cyprus) | Sachpazides, Valerios | 1.90 m (6 ft 3 in) |
| PG | 19 | (Cyprus) | Anthymiades, Stefanos | 1.85 m (6 ft 1 in) |
| F | -- | (United States) | Shabazz, Bilal | 2.03 m (6 ft 8 in) |
| G | -- | (United States) | Tention, Miles | 1.96 m (6 ft 5 in) |
| F | -- | (United States) | Watson, Zac | 2.01 m (6 ft 7 in) |
| G | -- | (Canada) | Vreeken, Connor | 1.96 m (6 ft 5 in) |

Head coach

- (Cyprus) Kyriakos Giangoullis

Assistant coach(es)

- (Cyprus) Alexis Lekisvili

Legend

- (C) Team captain

== Notable players ==
Note: Flags indicate national team eligibility at FIBA-sanctioned events. Players may hold other non-FIBA nationalities not displayed.

Criteria

To appear in this section a player must have either:

- Set a club record or won an individual award while at the club
- Played at least one official international match for their national team at any time
- Played at least one official NBA match at any time.

- (United States) Joseph Hutt
- (Bosnia and Herzegovina) Marko Milisević
- (Bosnia and Herzegovina) Vladimir Radovanović
- (Bosnia and Herzegovina) Branko Zotović
- (Bulgaria) Emil Jonov
- (Serbia) Nikola Kuga
- (Serbia) Andelko Mandić
- (Serbia) (United States) Dejan Matić
- (Serbia) Zivko Misiraca
- (Serbia) Djordje Pantelić
- (Serbia) Zoran Stevanović
- (United States) Cornelius Ausborne
- (United States) Cory Bradford
- (United States) Isaac Burton
- (United States) David Butler
- (United States) Jason Carter-Wallace
- (United States) Mark Clark
- (United States) Darrin Fowlkes
- (United States) Chris Garner
- (United States) (Spain) Clayton Johnson
- (United States) Joseph Jones
- (United States) Danny Jones
- (United States) Tony Lane
- (United States) Malcolm Leak
- (United States) Marquis Melton
- (United States) Jenny Reynolds
- (United States) Carlos Smith
- (United States) Everick Sullivan
- (United States) (Germany) Adam Waleskowski
- (United States) Nate Wilbourne
- (United States) Micheal Williams

== Volleyball ==
The Men's volleyball division was one of the founding members of the Cyprus Volleyball Federation. It currently competes in the Cyprus Men's Volleyball Second division.

== Honours ==
Men's Basketball

- Cyprus Basketball Division 1
  - Winner (5): 1974–75, 1976–77, 1983–84, 1985–86, 1992–93
  - Runner Up (6): 1986–87, 1988–89, 1989–90, 1991–92, 1996–97, 1998–99
- Cyprus Men's Basketball Cup:
  - Winner (7): 1973–74, 1974–75, 1975–76, 1976–77, 1987–88, 1989–90, 1999–2000
  - Runner-up (4): 1980–81, 1981–82, 1982–83, 1983–84, 2009–10
- Cyprus Men's Basketball Supercup
  - Winner (4): 1990, 1992, 1993, 1996

Women's Basketball

- Cyprus Basketball Women's League – Division 1
  - Winner (1): 1986–87
  - Runner Up (1): 2000–01, 2009–10
- Cyprus Women's Basketball Cup:
  - Winner (1): 2006–07
  - Runner-up (4): 1999–00, 2000–01, 2001–02, 2008–09

== Football ==
Achilleas Kaimakli FC was a Cypriot football club based in Kaimakli, Nicosia. Founded in 1957, was playing sometimes in Second, in Third and in Fourth Division. The team dissolved after 1988.
