= ENAD Ayiou Dometiou =

Ydra Asfalistiki ENAD Ύδρα Ασφαλιστική ΕΝΑΔ
- Leagues: Cypriot Division A
- Founded: 1937; 88 years ago
- History: 1937-present
- Arena: Lefkotheo (capacity: 3,000)
- Location: Agios Dometios, Nicosia
- Team colors: Blue and white
- President: Charalambos Lottas
- Head coach: Marios Argyrou
- Championships: 2 Cypriot Championships (1969, 1990)
- Website: enadbc.com
| Home | Away |

ENAD (Enosis Neon Agiou Dometiou, Union of Youth of Agios Dometios), (Greek: Ε.Ν.Α.Δ. Ένωσις Νέων Αγίου Δομετίου) is a first division basketball team based in the Agios Dometios district of Nicosia, Cyprus. It was founded in 1937 via the merger of three local sports clubs. Over the years, it has run basketball, football, table tennis and volleyball divisions. However the club is best known for its basketball team which has won 2 championship titles and 1 national cup. It competes in the top basketball division of Cyprus.

== Honours ==
=== Basketball ===
- Cyprus Basketball Division 1:
  - Winner (2) 1969, 1990.
- Cyprus Men's Basketball Cup:
  - Winner (1): 1987
  - Runner-up (3): 1972, 1985, 1990, 2012
- Cyprus Men's Basketball Supercup:
  - Winner (1): 1987

== Roster ==
ENAD BC Roster
Players
Coaches

| Pos. | Νο. | Nat. | Name | Ht. |
|---|---|---|---|---|
| PG | 4 | (United States) | Panayiotis, Yiannas | 1.83 m (6 ft 0 in) |
| G | 5 | (Cyprus) | Mashias, Nikos | 1.80 m (5 ft 11 in) |
| G/F | 6 | (Georgia (country)) | Chkhatarashvili, Niko | 1.96 m (6 ft 5 in) |
| F | 7 | (Serbia) | Matic, Aleksandar | 2.03 m (6 ft 8 in) |
| F/C | 8 | (Cyprus) | Philippou, Stelios (C) | 1.96 m (6 ft 5 in) |
| G | 9 | (Cyprus) | Hadi, Elhaj | 1.78 m (5 ft 10 in) |
| F | 10 | (Serbia) | Djurasovic, Nikola | 1.98 m (6 ft 6 in) |
| C | 11 | (United States) | Damjanovic, Aleksandar | 2.06 m (6 ft 9 in) |
| PG | 12 | (United States) | Reed, Dewayne | 1.83 m (6 ft 0 in) |
| C | 13 | (Cyprus) | Ioannou, Demetris | 2.02 m (6 ft 8 in) |
| PG | 14 | (Cyprus) | Laser, Tyler | 1.85 m (6 ft 1 in) |
| F | 15 | (Cyprus) | Makris, Dimitris | 2.02 m (6 ft 8 in) |
| PG | 16 | (United States) | Constantinou, Giorgos | 2.40 m (7 ft 10 in) |

Head coach

- (Cyprus) Marios Argyrou

Legend

- (C) Team captain

== Notable players ==
Note: Flags indicate national team eligibility at FIBA-sanctioned events. Players may hold other non-FIBA nationalities not displayed.

Criteria

To appear in this section a player must have either:

- Set a club record or won an individual award while at the club
- Played at least one official international match for their national team at any time
- Played at least one official NBA match at any time.

- Jerel Blassingame
- Isaac Burton
- Jarhon Giddings
- Bryan Hill
- Jack Ingram
- Akeli Jackson
- Earl Johnson
- Bevon Robin
- Don Ross
- Harold Swanagan
- Orion Garo
- Aleksandar Smiljanić

== Football ==
ENAD Ayiou Dometiou FC is a Cypriot football club based in Ayios Dhometios, Nicosia. Founded in 1957, it played in the second, third and fourth divisions. The team dissolved after 1993 and reactive at 2013.
