= APOP Paphos B.C. =

- Leagues: Cypriot Championship
- Founded: 2003; 23 years ago
- History: 2003–present
- Arena: Akis Kleanthous Sports Hall
- Location: Paphos, Cyprus
- Team colors: Blue, White
- President: (Cyprus) Soteris Georgiades
- Head coach: (Cyprus) Alexis Lekisvili
- Website: Official website
Home	Away

APOP Paphos (in Greek: ΑΠΟΠ Πάφου), is a Cypriot professional basketball club based in Paphos, Cyprus. The club competes in the Cypriot League. The president of the team is Soteris Georgiades. The club also has a woman’s team in the Cypriot League and a wheelchair team.

== History ==
The parent club was founded in 1953, therefore, the department of basketball founded in 2003, 3 years after the dissolution of the parent club.

== Players ==
=== Current roster ===
APOP Paphos Roster
Players
Coaches

Pos.	Νο.	Nat.	Name	Ht.
PG	3	(United States)	Washington, TJ	1.83 m (6 ft 0 in)
SF	4	(Cyprus)	Pasiali, Ioannis	1.95 m (6 ft 5 in)
PG	5	(Cyprus)	Costi, Constantinos	1.83 m (6 ft 0 in)
PG	9	(Cyprus)	Stavrou, Demetris	1.80 m (5 ft 11 in)
G/F	10	(Cyprus)	Porfyrides, George	1.99 m (6 ft 6 in)
F	13	(Cyprus)	Demetriou, Athos (C)	2.02 m (6 ft 8 in)
PF	14	(United States)	Walley, Tristin	2.01 m (6 ft 7 in)
SG	15	(Cyprus)	Grivas, Kostantinos	1.90 m (6 ft 3 in)
PG	19	(United States)	Pigram, Courtney	1.85 m (6 ft 1 in)
G	44	(Cyprus)	Polemitis, Panayiotis	1.88 m (6 ft 2 in)
SG	99	(Cyprus)	Tziolis, Panagiotis	1.85 m (6 ft 1 in)

Head coach

- (Cyprus) Markos Asonitis

Assistant coach

- (Cyprus) Panos Polemitis

Legend

- (C) Team captain

== Sources ==
- Cyprus Basketball Federation
- Eurobasket.com APOP Paphos BC Page
