= Cypriot Basketball Cup =

Cypriot Basketball Men's A Division Cup
- Sport: Basketball
- Founded: 1967
- Motto: Το άθλημα μας (Our Sport)
- No. of teams: 6
- Country: Cyprus
- Most recent champion: AEL Limassol B.C. (10th title) (2025–26)
- Most titles: Keravnos (13 titles)
- Related competitions: Cypriot Division A Cypriot Super Cup
- Website: Cyprus Basketball Federation

The Cypriot Basketball Cup is an annual professional basketball national cup competition, organized by the Cyprus Basketball Federation since 1969.

== Format ==
Starting in 2007, the Cypriot Cup competition's format changed to where only teams from the Cypriot A Division compete at the cup. The cup employs a knock-out stage and a final four format. The Cup's winner automatically qualifies to compete in the next season of the FIBA Europe Cup competition.

== Teams ==
The following six teams (in alphabetical order) competed in the 2018–19 season:

- AEK Larnaca - Larnaca
- APOEL - Nicosia
- Apollon Limassol - Limassol
- Enosis Neon Paralimni - Paralimni
- ETHA Engomis - Engomi, Nicosia
- Keravnos - Strovolos, Nicosia
- Omonoia - Nicosia
- AEL Limassol - Limassol

== Cup winners ==
- 1969 – Pezoporikos
- 1970 – Pezoporikos
- 1971 – Pezoporikos
- 1972 – Pezoporikos
- 1973 – APOEL
- 1974 – Achilleas
- 1975 – Achilleas
- 1976 – Achilleas
- 1977 – Achilleas
- 1978 – AEL
- 1979 – APOEL
- 1980 – AEL
- 1981 – AEL
- 1982 – AEL
- 1983 – AEL
- 1984 – APOEL
- 1985 – AEL
- 1986 – APOEL
- 1987 – ENAD
- 1988 – Achilleas
- 1989 – Keravnos
- 1990 – Achilleas
- 1991 – APOEL
- 1992 – Pezoporikos
- 1993 – APOEL
- 1994 – APOEL
- 1995 – APOEL
- 1996 – APOEL
- 1997 – Keravnos
- 1998 – Keravnos
- 1999 – Keravnos
- 2000 – Achilleas
- 2001 – APOEL
- 2002 – Apollon
- 2003 – APOEL
- 2004 – AEL
- 2005 – Keravnos
- 2006 – Keravnos
- 2007 – Keravnos
- 2008 – AEL
- 2009 – AEL
- 2010 – Keravnos
- 2011 – ETHA
- 2012 – Keravnos
- 2013 – ETHA
- 2014 – Apollon
- 2015 – ETHA
- 2016 – APOEL
- 2017 – AEK Larnaca
- 2018 – AEK Larnaca
- 2019 – Keravnos
- 2021 – AEK Larnaca
- 2022 – Keravnos
- 2023 – AEK Larnaca
- 2024 – Keravnos
- 2025 – Keravnos
- 2026 – AEL

== Performance by club ==
Team	Winners	Years won
Keravnos	13	1989, 1997, 1998, 1999, 2005, 2006, 2007, 2010, 2012, 2019, 2022, 2024, 2025
APOEL	12	1973, 1979, 1984, 1986, 1991, 1993, 1994, 1995, 1996, 2001, 2003, 2016
AEL	10	1978, 1980, 1981, 1982, 1983, 1985, 2004, 2008, 2009, 2026
Achilleas	7	1974, 1975, 1976, 1977, 1988, 1990, 2000
Pezoporikos	5	1969, 1970, 1971, 1972, 1992
AEK	4	2017, 2018, 2021, 2023
ETHA	3	2011, 2013, 2015
Apollon	2	2002, 2014
ENAD	1	1987

== MVP Award ==
Source:eurobasket.com

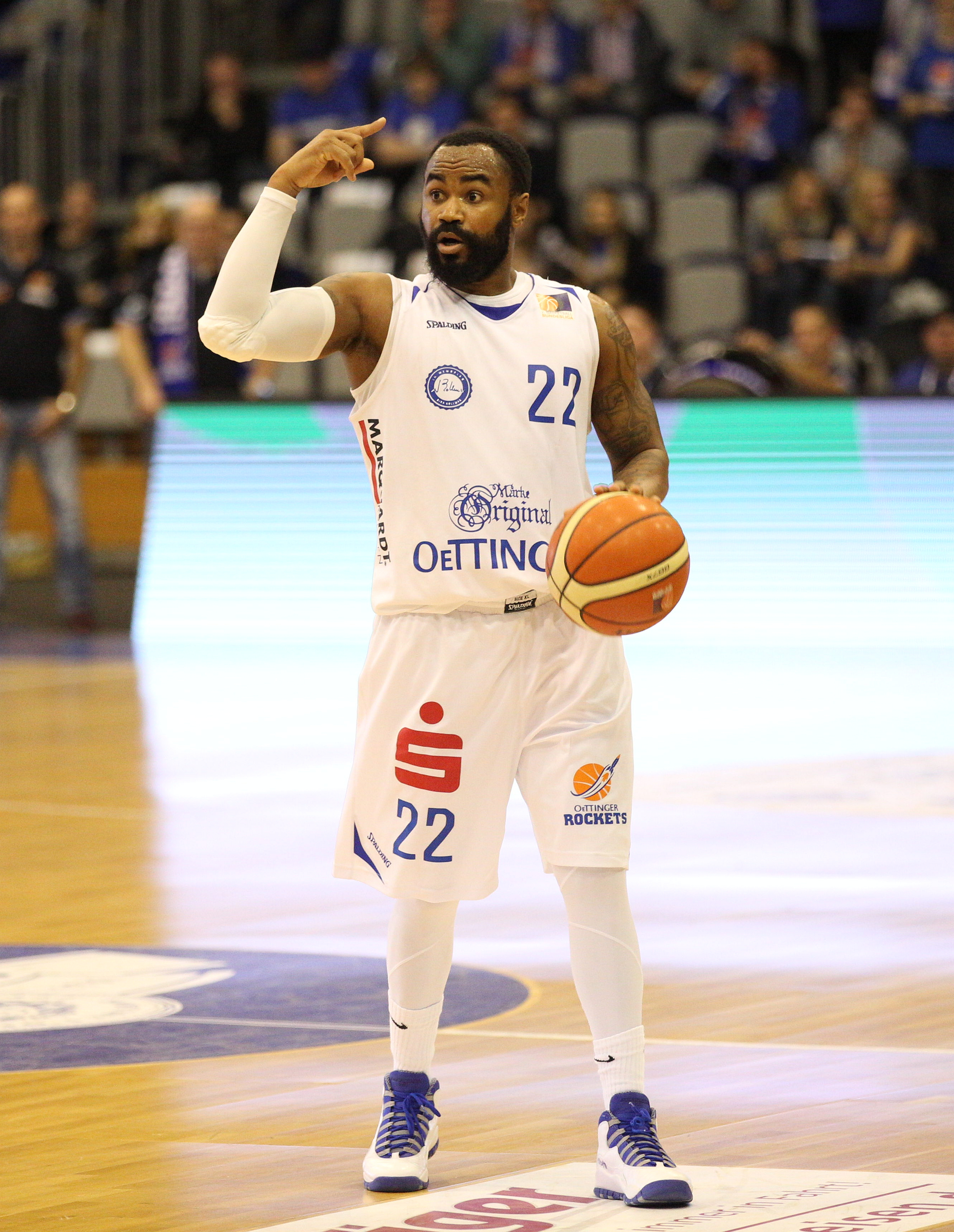
Darrel Mitchell was the MVP in the 2009 Final.

Final Four

- 2003 – (United States) George Banks – APOEL B.C.

Finals

- 2005 – (United States) Dan Cross – Keravnos
- 2006 – (United States) George Banks – Keravnos
- 2007 -
- 2008 – (Cyprus) Panagiotis Trisokkas – Keravnos
- 2009 – (United States) Darrel Mitchell – AEL Limassol
- 2011– (United States) Anthony King – ETHA Engomis
- 2012 - (Bosnia and Herzegovina) Aleksandar Damjanović - ENAD Ayiou Dometiou
- 2013 – (Montenegro) Ivan Maraš – ETHA Engomis
- 2014 – (Cyprus) Grigoris Pantouris – Apollon Limassol
- 2015 – (United States) Chris Ferguson – ETHA
- 2016 – (United States) Tyrell Biggs – APOEL
- 2017 – (Slovenia) Primož Brezec – AEK Larnaca
- 2018 – (United States) Tyreek Duren – AEK Larnaca
- 2019 – (United States) (Cyprus) Darral Willis – Keravnos
- 2021 – (Nigeria) Derek Ogbeide – AEK Larnaca
- 2022 –
- 2023 - (United States) Taveion Hollingsworth - AEK Larnaca
- 2024 – (Cyprus) Filippos Tigkas – Keravnos
- 2025 – (Cyprus) Filippos Tigkas – Keravnos
- 2026 – (United States) Myles Alexander Tate - AEL Limassol B.C.

== Topscorers ==
=== Final ===
Year	Player	Points	Team
2011	(United States) Rodney Buford	15	AEL Limassol
2013	(United States) Donte Poole	17	ETHA Engomis
2014	(United States) (Georgia (country)) Thad McFadden	22	APOEL B.C.
2015	(Greece) Michalis Kakiouzis (Sweden) (Democratic Republic of the Congo) Thomas Massamba	17	APOEL B.C. ETHA Engomis
2016	(United States) Tyrell Biggs	26	APOEL B.C.
2017	(Slovenia) Primož Brezec	19	AEK Larnaca
2018	(United States) Trevis Wyche	30	ETHA Engomis
2019	(United States) Darral Willis	40	Keravnos
2021	(United States) Quentin Snider	19	AEK Larnaca
2022	(United States) Collin Malcolm	21	Keravnos
2023	(Georgia (country)) Duda Sanadze	25	Anorthosis Ammochostou
2024	(United States) Taveion Hollingsworth (United States) Tony Crocker	16	AEK Larnaca; Keravnos
2025	(Cyprus) Filippos Tigkas	28	Keravnos
2026	(United States) Myles Alexander Tate	25	AEL Limassol B.C.

== Winning coaches ==
Head coach	Cups	Years Won	Years Lost
(Serbia) / (Cyprus) Dragan Raca	4	1997, 1998, 1999, 2009
(Cyprus) Takis Lyras	4	1974, 1975, 1976, 1977
(Greece) Michalis Kakiouzis	3	2022 (Note: Assistant Vassilis Kounas was on the bench.), 2024, 2025
(Cyprus) Christoforos Leivadiotis	2	2015, 2019	2017, 2021, 2023, 2024
(Cyprus) Panagiotis Yiannaras	2	2012, 2014	2013
(Greece) Sakis Laios	1	1997
(Greece) Nikos Linardos	1	2003
(United States) (Sweden) Charles Barton	1	2008
(Greece) Vassilis Fragkias	1	2007	2000, 2001
(Greece) Christos Magkotsios	1	2002
(Greece) Nikos Pavlou	1	1995
(Greece) Giorgos Vovoras	1	2016
(Israel) Adi Azoulay	1	2010
(Greece) Periklis Tavropoulos	2	1996, 2002
(Serbia) / (Greece) Vlade Đurović	1	2000
(Cyprus) Linos Gavriel	1	2017	2016
(Cyprus) Antonis Toni Konstantinides	1	2011, 2023	2014, 2025
(Cyprus) Nikos Papadopoulos	1	2021	2015
(Cyprus) Takis Mirallais	1	1988 (Note: Mirallais as player-coach 1988.)
(Cyprus) Kyriakos Adamou	1	2013	2008
(Cyprus) Dimitris Koukouris	1	2018	2019
(Cyprus) Palladios Nikoalou	1	1973
(Cyprus) Lazaros Papadimitriou	1	1989
(Cyprus) Giorgos Lambrou	1	1988	1995
(Cyprus) George Thyrotos	1	1989
(Cyprus) Dinos Michailides	1	1984
(Cyprus) Panagiotis Pierri	1	1970 (Note: Panagiotis Pierri 1970.)
(Greece) Charis Papazoglou	1	1998
(Cyprus) Markos Asonitis	-		2022
(Cyprus) Giorgos Bitzanis	-		2018
(Cyprus) Christos Stylianidis	-		2009
(Cyprus) Marios Aegyrou	-		2012
(Latvia) Igors Miglinieks	-		2007
(Cyprus) Renos Pittalis	-		2003
(Cyprus) Giorgos Triantaphyllides	-		1998
(Cyprus) Nasos Panayiotou	-		1984
(United States) Johnny Neumann	-		1997
(Cyprus) Paris Papaellinas	-		1988 (Note: Papaellinas as player-coach 1988.)
(Cyprus) Alekos Iakovides	-		1970 and 1971 (Note: Alekos Iakovides as player-coach 1970, 1971.)

== See also ==
- Cyprus Basketball Division A
- Cypriot Basketball Super Cup
