= Omonia B.C. =

Omonia Nicosia
- Nickname: Trifylli (Shamrock)
- Leagues: Cyprus Basket League; Cypus Basketball First Division
- Founded: 1948; 78 years ago
- Arena: Agios Dometios Indoor Hall
- Capacity: 2,000
- Location: Nicosia, Cyprus
- President: Marios Argirides
- Head coach: Michael Matsentides
- Website: http://www.omonoia.com.cy
Home	Away

Omonia (Greek: Ομόνοια), is a Cypriot professional basketball club based in Nicosia, Cyprus. The club competes in Cyprus Basket League Division 1 for season 2022–2023. The president of the team is Marios Argirides and the Head Coach is Michael Matsentides.

== History ==
Omonia BC was founded in 1948 from then the team participates regularly in the Cyprus Basketball Division 1. The team has never won neither a championship neither a cup. However, the team has sometimes finished first and second in the regular season of the Cyprus Basketball Division 1, it could not manage to proceed far and away from its opponents.

=== Regular season league positions ===
Season	Position
1991–1992	1st
1992–1993	2nd
1993–1994	2nd
1994–1995	1st
1997–1998	10th
1998–1999	12th
1999–2000	1st
2000–2001	7th

Season	Position
2001–2002	9th
2002–2003	7th
2003–2004	7th
2004–2005	7th
2005–2006	7th
2006–2007	3rd
2007–2008	5th
2008–2009	9th

=== Honors ===
Cyprus Basketball Division B

- Champions (3): 1988–89, 1993–94, 1999–00

=== European competitions ===
- 1995–96: Korać Cup
- 1996–97: Korać Cup

== Roster ==
Omonia B.C. Roster
Players
Coaches

Pos.	Νο.	Nat.	Name	Ht.
PG	3	(Cyprus)	Vatyliotis, Dimitris	1.88 m (6 ft 2 in)
G	5	(Canada)	John, Cody	1.90 m (6 ft 3 in)
G	6	(Cyprus)	Mythillos, Michalis	1.90 m (6 ft 3 in)
PF	9	(Cyprus)	Karampatakis, Christos	1.96 m (6 ft 5 in)
PG	11	(Cyprus)	Liasides, Ilias	1.80 m (5 ft 11 in)
G/F	12	(Cyprus)	Pilakoutas, Constantinos (C)	1.93 m (6 ft 4 in)
PG	13	(Cyprus)	Papademetriou, Nikolaos	1.88 m (6 ft 2 in)
G/F	15	(United States)	Harden, Elias	1.98 m (6 ft 6 in)
C	21	(United States)	Dallas, Jordan	2.08 m (6 ft 10 in)
F	24	(United States)	Burrell, Romelo	2.01 m (6 ft 7 in)
G/F	34	(Cyprus)	Tsintas, Andreas	1.91 m (6 ft 3 in)

Head coach

- (Cyprus) Michael Matsentides

Assistant coach(es)Nikolas Koursaris

Legend

- (C) Team captain

== Former players ==
- (Belgium) Duke Tshomba
- (Bosnia and Herzegovina) Goran Adzić
- (Bosnia and Herzegovina) Bojan Barjaktarević
- (Bosnia and Herzegovina) Dejan Bojinović
- (Bosnia and Herzegovina) Alen Jazvin
- (Bulgaria) Sasa Vezenkov
- (Canada) Kyle Julius
- (Croatia) Luka Jelaska
- (Croatia) Zvonimir Kovacević
- (Democratic Republic of the Congo) Bob Menama
- (Lithuania) Linas Juknevicius
- (Hungary) Peter Farago
- (Serbia) Vladimir Lukić
- (Serbia) Andelko Mandić
- (Serbia) Sasa Mijajlović
- (Serbia) Vladimir Mijović
- (Serbia) Saša Avalić
- (United States) Will Chavis
- (United States) Eugene Dabney
- (United States) Arthur Davis
- (United States) Darrin Fowlkes
- (United States) Brian Green
- (United States) Harry Hart
- (United States) Sean Jamieson
- (United States) Nolan Johnson
- (United States) Mike King
- (United States) Jerome LaGrange
- (United States) Reggie Manuel
- (United States) Rob Phelps
- (United States) B.J. Pratt
- (United States) Marlon Smith
- (United States) Marvin Stone
- (United States) Jay Taylor
- (United States) James Williams
- (United States) Eugene Harris
- (United States) Jamar Anthony Diggs
