= APOEL B.C. =

Cypriot professional basketball club

APOEL
- Nickname: ΘΡΥΛΟΣ The legend
- Leagues: Cypriot Division A Cypriot Cup
- Founded: 1947; 79 years ago
- Arena: Lefkotheo Indoor Arena
- Capacity: 2,100
- Location: Nicosia, Cyprus
- Head coach: Ioannis Damalis
- Championships: 11 Cypriot Championships; 12 Cypriot Cups; 11 Cypriot Super Cups
- Website: apoel.com.cy
Home	Away

APOEL Basketball Club, also known as APOEL PERESTROIKA for sponsorship reasons and better known simply as APOEL, is a Cypriot professional basketball club based in the city of Nicosia. It is a part of the APOEL multi-sport club. APOEL is one of the most successful basketball clubs in Cyprus with an overall tally of 11 Championships, 12 Cups and 11 Super Cups.

== History ==
APOEL was formed in 1926, but the basketball team was formed in 1947. The team's first ever basketball title was the Cypriot Super Cup, which they won in 1972. At the end of the same season (1972–73), APOEL won their second title, the Cypriot Cup. The team achieved to win their first ever Championship title three years later, in season 1975–76.

The 90's decade was the most successful for APOEL. The team won 4 Championships, 5 Cups and 4 Super Cups during that period, including one double on the 1995–96 season.

After winning the double in 2001–02 season, APOEL won again the Championship in 2008–09 season, after 6 years without winning any title. The next season (2009–10), the team won their second consecutive Championship title and reached the quarterfinals of the FIBA EuroChallenge, marking their most successful campaign in the European competitions.

After four years without winning any title, APOEL won again the Championship in 2013–14 season, which was their 11th league title in their history. During 2015–16 season, APOEL won their 12th Cypriot Cup trophy, thirteen years after their last Cypriot Cup title. The next season (2016–17), APOEL returned in the European competitions after a five years break and reached the second round (Last 24) of the FIBA Europe Cup, marking one of their most successful seasons in the European competitions.

== League positions ==
Season	Div.	Pos.
1966–67	Div. A	5th
1967–68	Div. A	3rd
1968–69	Div. A	2nd
1969–70	Div. A	5th
1970–71	Div. A	8th
1971–72	Div. A	5th
1972–73	Div. A	2nd
1973–74	Div. A	5th
1974–75	Div. A	4th

Season	Div.	Pos.
1975–76	Div. A	1st
1976–77	Div. A	2nd
1977–78	Div. A	2nd
1978–79	Div. A	1st
1979–80	Div. A	3rd
1980–81	Div. A	1st
1981–82	Div. A	4th
1982–83	Div. A	7th
1983–84	Div. A	3rd

Season	Div.	Pos.
1984–85	Div. A	2nd
1985–86	Div. A	2nd
1986–87	Div. A	3rd
1987–88	Div. A	2nd
1988–89	Div. A	8th
1989–90	Div. A	3rd
1990–91	Div. A	2nd
1991–92	Div. A	4th
1992–93	Div. A	2nd

Season	Div.	Pos.
1993–94	Div. A	2nd
1994–95	Div. A	1st
1995–96	Div. A	1st
1996–97	Div. A	3rd
1997–98	Div. A	1st
1998–99	Div. A	1st
1999–00	Div. A	8th
2000–01	Div. A	4th
2001–02	Div. A	1st

Season	Div.	Pos.
2002–03	Div. A	4th
2003–04	Div. A	3rd
2004–05	Div. A	3rd
2005–06	Div. A	5th
2006–07	Div. A	2nd
2007–08	Div. A	2nd
2008–09	Div. A	1st
2009–10	Div. A	1st
2010–11	Div. A	3rd

Season	Div.	Pos.
2011–12	Div. A	5th
2012–13	Div. A	2nd
2013–14	Div. A	1st
2014–15	Div. A	2nd
2015–16	Div. A	2nd
2016–17	Div. A	3rd
2017–18	Div. A	3rd
2018–19	Div. A	3rd

== Honours ==
- Cypriot Championship

Winners (11): 1975–76, 1978–79, 1980–81, 1994–95, 1995–96, 1997–98, 1998–99, 2001–02, 2008–09, 2009–10, 2013–14

- Cypriot Cup

Winners (12) (record): 1972–73, 1978–79, 1983–84, 1985–86, 1990–91, 1992–93, 1993–94, 1994–95, 1995–96, 2001–02, 2002–03, 2015–16

- Cypriot Super Cup

Winners (11) (record): 1972, 1976, 1986, 1994, 1995, 1996, 1998, 2001, 2002, 2010, 2014

== European campaigns ==
Last Update: 26 January 2017

Season	Competition	Matches	Wins	Loses	For	Against
2016–17	FIBA Europe Cup	12	4	8	74.1	78.1
2010–11	ULEB Eurocup	2	0	2	59.0	90.5
2010–11	EuroChallenge	6	3	3	72.8	73.3
2009–10	ULEB Eurocup	2	1	1	69.5	70.0
2009–10	EuroChallenge	14	7	7	78.9	78.4
2008–09	EuroChallenge	2	0	2	56.5	67.5
2007–08	FIBA EuroCup	2	1	1	86.5	89.0
2005–06	EuroCup Challenge	8	5	3	81.3	77.8
2004–05	FIBA Europe Cup	6	4	2	88.7	86.8
2003–04	FIBA Europe Cup	6	3	3	87.5	81.7
2002–03	FIBA Europe Champions Cup	10	1	9	64.4	84.7
2001–02	Korać Cup	2	0	2	71.0	84.0
1999–00	Saporta Cup	10	0	10	51.3	84.6
1998–99	Saporta Cup	10	3	7	68.9	73.6
1996–97	EuroCup	10	1	9	62.6	83.1
1995–96	European Championship for Men's Clubs	4	2	2	67.3	67.5
1995–96	European Cup for Men's Clubs	2	0	2	66.5	93.5
1994–95	European Cup for Men's Clubs	2	1	1	80.0	81.0
1993–94	European Cup for Men's Clubs	2	0	2	66.5	96.0
1992–93	European Cup Radivoj Korać	2	0	2	88.0	107.0
1991–92	European Cup for Men's Clubs	2	0	2	53.5	108.5
1990–91	European Cup Radivoj Korać	2	0	2	55.0	87.0
1988–89	European Cup Radivoj Korać	0	0	0	Withdrew	
1986–87	European Cup Winners' Cup	2	0	2	37.0	101.0
1985–86	European Cup Radivoj Korać	2	0	2	78.0	156.5
1984–85	European Cup Winners' Cup	2	0	2	57.0	121.5
1979–80	European Cup Winners' Cup	2	0	2	65.5	117.5
Total		126	36	90	68.7	90.0

== Sponsorship names ==
- 2002–2004 Elma APOEL
- 2004–2007 Dentalcon APOEL
- 2007–2008 Aspis APOEL
- 2008–2009 Seastar APOEL
- 2009–2010 Μadisons APOEL
- 2010–2013 Cytavision APOEL
- 2015–2016 Cytavision APOEL

== Players ==
=== Current roster ===
APOEL roster
Players
Coaches

Pos.	No.	Nat.	Name	Ht.	Age
C	1	(United States)	Taylor, Jimmie	2.08 m (6 ft 10 in)	30 – 3 September 1995
G	2	(Cyprus)	Sofokleous, Stelios	1.85 m (6 ft 1 in)	22 – 2 January 2004
PG	3	(United States)	Honor, Nick	1.78 m (5 ft 10 in)	25 – 8 October 2000
F	5	(United States)	Whyte, Walter	1.98 m (6 ft 6 in)	27 – 8 July 1998
G	6	(Cyprus)	Mythillos, Michalis	1.90 m (6 ft 3 in)	27 – 20 March 1998
PG	7	(Cyprus)	Chatzikostas, Christos	1.85 m (6 ft 1 in)	27 – 25 February 1998
SF	8	(Cyprus)	Kilaras, Gavriel (C)	1.97 m (6 ft 6 in)	36 – 9 January 1990
G/F	11	(Cyprus)	Papamichael, Petros	1.93 m (6 ft 4 in)	30 – 31 August 1995
C	15	(Cyprus)	Louca, Nikolaos	2.03 m (6 ft 8 in)	22 – 30 January 2003
F	32	(United States)	Henry, Phil	2.03 m (6 ft 8 in)	34 – 16 September 1991
SG	55	(United States)	Funderburk, Kenney	1.93 m (6 ft 4 in)	33 – 13 April 1992

Head coach

- (Cyprus) Marios Argyrou

Assistant coaches

- (Cyprus) Giannis Damalis

Legend

- (C) Team captain

=== Notable players ===
Note: Flags indicate national team eligibility at FIBA-sanctioned events. Players may hold other non-FIBA nationalities not displayed.

Criteria

To appear in this section a player must have either:

- Set a club record or won an individual award while at the club
- Played at least one official international match for their national team at any time
- Played at least one official NBA match at any time.

Cyprus

- (Cyprus) Giorgos Anastasiadis
- (Cyprus) Panagiotis Serdaris
- (Cyprus) Charis Soleas
- (Cyprus) Christos Stylianides
- (Cyprus) (Greece) Vassilis Kounas

Belgium

- (Belgium) Gerben Van Dorpe

Bermuda

- (Bermuda) (England) Sullivan Phillips

Cameroon

- (Cameroon) (Russia) Cyrille Makanda

Croatia

- (Croatia) Zvonko Buljan
- (Croatia) Saša Čuić

Czech Republic

- (Czech Republic) Ales Chan
- (Czech Republic) Michal Křemen

France

- (France) (Central African Republic) Michael Mokongo

Great Britain

- (United Kingdom) Ogo Adegboye
- (United Kingdom) (Canada) Kyle Johnson
- (United Kingdom) (United States) Tarick Johnson

Greece

- (Greece) Andreas Glyniadakis
- (Greece) Michalis Kakiouzis
- (Greece) Dimitrios Kalaitzidis

Israel

- (Israel) Amit Tamir

Lithuania

- (Lithuania) Martynas Andriukaitis
- (Lithuania) Augustinas Vitas

Mali

- (Mali) Ousmane Cisse

Montenegro

- (Montenegro) Balša Radunović
- (Montenegro) Damjan Kandić
- (Montenegro) Boris Lalović

Serbia

- (Serbia) (Croatia) Milan Dozet
- (Serbia) Dušan Jelić
- (Serbia) Mirko Kovač
- (Serbia) Ivan Mičeta
- (Serbia) Vukašin Mandić
- (Serbia) (Bosnia and Herzegovina) Aleksandar Radojević
- (Serbia) Lazar Radosavljević

USA

- (United States) Tony Dwayne Harris
- (United States) Rashid Atkins
- (United States) Jerome Beasley
- (United States) Rasheed Brokenborough
- (United States) Lonnie Cooper
- (United States) Jeremiah Davis
- (United States) Jamar Diggs
- (United States) Brandon Ewing
- (United States) Callistus Eziukwu
- (United States) Charron Fisher
- (United States) (Cyprus) Darrin Fowlkes
- (United States) (Belgium) Ian Hanavan
- (United States) Earl Harrison
- (United States) Brandon Heath
- (United States) Rick Hughes
- (United States) Ryan Humphrey
- (United States) Mike Jones
- (United States) Wykeen Kelly
- (United States) Frankie King
- (United States) Arthur Lee
- (United States) Thaddeus McFadden
- (United States) Donte Poole
- (United States) (Israel) Jeron Roberts
- (United States) Anthony Roberson
- (United States) (Spain) Lewis Sims
- (United States) Dante Stiggers
- (United States) Loren Stokes
- (United States) Kevin Tiggs
- (United States) (Dominican Republic) Larry Turner
- (United States) Tyson Wheeler
- (United States) Isaac Wells
- (United States) QJ Peterson

== Women's team ==
=== History ===
APOEL also maintains a women's team which is competing in the women's Cypriot First Division. In their most successful seasons, APOEL women's team reached the Championship finals twice (2003–04 & 2004–05) and qualified two times for the semi-finals of the Cup (2004–05 & 2006–07).
