= 2019–20 Cyprus Basketball Division A =

Cyprus Basketball Division A
- Duration: October 2019 – May 2020
- Teams: 9

The 2019–20 Cyprus Basketball Division A was the 53rd season of the Cyprus Basketball Division A, the top-tier level men's professional basketball league on Cyprus.

Due to the coronavirus pandemic, the league was suspended on 17 March 2020.

== Teams and locations ==
Locations of the 2019–20 Cyprus Basketball Division A teams

Team	City	Venue
APOEL	Nicosia	Lefkotheo
Apollon	Limassol	Apollon Arena
EKA AEL	Limassol	Nicos Solomonides Arena
APOP	Paphos	Aphroditi Sports Hall
Enosis Neon	Paralimni	Avgorou Technical School
ETHA	Engomi	Eleftheria Indoor Hall
Keravnos	Strovolos	Costas Papaellinas Arena
Omonia	Nicosia	Eleftheria Indoor Hall
Petrolina AEK	Larnaca	Kition Athletic Center

== Regular season ==
=== League table ===
Pos	Team	Pld	W	L	PF	PA	PD	Pts	Qualification
1	Keravnos	21	19	2	1749	1408	+341	40	Qualification for Champions League qualifying round
2	Petrolina AEK	21	18	3	1729	1411	+318	39	
3	Apollon	21	13	8	1683	1633	+50	34	
4	APOEL	22	11	11	1625	1613	+12	33	
5	Enosis Neon	22	10	12	1551	1636	−85	32	
6	ETHA	21	9	12	1629	1649	−20	30	
7	Omonia	21	9	12	1570	1585	−15	30	
8	EKA AEL	21	5	16	1462	1657	−195	26	
9	APOP	22	2	20	1398	1804	−406	24	

Updated to match(es) played on 12 March 2020. Source: CBF

=== Results ===
Home \ Away	APO	LIM	AEL	PAR	ETH	KER	OMO	AEK	PAP	APO	LIM	AEL	PAR	ETH	KER	OMO	AEK	PAP
APOEL	—	82–77	66–52	68–71	71–77	56–76	82–74	56–80	78–63	—		96–67			80–95			
Apollon	72–59	—	81–75	88–75	90–87	85–88	96–81	71–82	81–55		—	81–67	81–83		58–72			
EKA AEL	63–69	71–83	—	79–63	83–79	75–99	65–78	69–82	63–54			—	81–60	62–80				
Enosis Neon	77–63	75–76	74–80	—	75–67	66–61	73–68	50–80	79–71				—			61–70	54–67	70–77
ETHA	81–87	81–84	90–61	71–80	—	68–85	103–84	70–111	81–70					—		83–71		89–58
Keravnos	100–63	79–65	95–76	85–73	77–54	—	73–61	77–64	94–52				81–61	96–78	—		68–72	
Omonia	75–63	85–86	89–58	76–78	70–73	76–84	—	67–85	87–76	70–68		76–65				—		
Petrolina AEK	77–67	94–85	84–77	87–66	75–67	68–70	85–58	—	81–56	72–82	94–77						—	93–57
APOP	60–85	76–89	78–73	59–87	60–68	57–94	60–79	67–96	—	52–85	72–77					68–75		—

Updated to match(es) played on 12 March 2020. Source: CBF
Legend: Blue = home team win; Red = away team win.

== Cypriot clubs in European competitions ==
Team	Competition	Progress
Keravnos	Champions League	Second qualifying round
Keravnos	FIBA Europe Cup	Regular season
APOEL	FIBA Europe Cup	Regular season
