= 2018–19 Cyprus Basketball Division A =

Cyprus Basketball Division A
- Duration: 13 October 2018 – May 2019
- Teams: 8

Regular season
- Relegated: EKA AEL; Enosis Neon

Finals
- Champions: Keravnos (7th title)
- Runners-up: Petrolina AEK

The 2018–19 Cyprus Basketball Division A is the 52nd season of the Cyprus Basketball Division A, the top-tier level men's professional basketball league on Cyprus. It started on 13 October 2018.

== Competition format ==
Eight teams joined the regular season, where after a three-legs round-robin tournament, the four first qualified would join the playoffs for the title.

AEL and Omonia promoted from Division 2 while APOP was relegated.

== Teams and locations ==
Locations of the 2018–19 Cyprus Basketball Division A teams

Team	City	Venue
APOEL	Nicosia	Lefkotheo
Apollon	Limassol	Apollon Arena
EKA AEL	Limassol	Nicos Solomonides Arena
Enosis Neon	Paralimni	Avgorou Technical School
ETHA	Engomi	Eleftheria Indoor Hall
Keravnos	Strovolos	Costas Papaellinas Arena
Omonia	Nicosia	Eleftheria Indoor Hall
Petrolina AEK	Larnaca	Kition Athletic Center

== Regular season ==
=== League table ===
Pos	Team	Pld	W	L	PF	PA	PD	Pts	Qualification
1	Petrolina AEK	21	17	4	1693	1466	+227	38	Qualification to playoffs
2	Keravnos	21	15	6	1684	1528	+156	36	Qualification to playoffs
3	APOEL	21	13	8	1611	1533	+78	34	Qualification to playoffs
4	ETHA	21	9	12	1556	1602	−46	30	Qualification to playoffs
5	Apollon	21	9	12	1589	1667	−78	30	
6	Omonia	21	8	13	1442	1589	−147	29	
7	EKA AEL (R)	21	7	14	1555	1629	−74	28	Relegation to Division B
8	Enosis Neon (R)	21	6	15	1511	1627	−116	27	Relegation to Division B

Source: CBF
(R) Relegated

=== Results ===
Home \ Away	APO	LIM	AEL	PAR	ETH	KER	OMO	AEK	APO	LIM	AEL	PAR	ETH	KER	OMO	AEK
APOEL	—	78–72	84–79	82–75	85–68	78–85	85–65	88–86	—	—	—	57–65	73–62	74–80	80–82	—
Apollon	76–82	—	80–73	89–71	74–83	59–93	80–69	85–81	80–86	—	—	80–77	68–65	—	66–83	—
EKA AEL	55–70	90–87	—	80–61	70–59	71–74	72–64	80–81	79–87	93–86	—	79–63	—	—	—	—
Enosis Neon	67–80	87–91	75–64	—	83–80	77–78	87–76	75–85	—	—	—	—	89–91	64–69	—	56–78
ETHA	60–57	84–73	92–77	73–68	—	69–70	52–64	67–76	—		85–74	—	—	87–82	—	86–101
Keravnos	74–87	76–82	67–68	96–77	81–68	—	88–62	95–100	—	86–75	84–70	—	—	—	89–92	70–69
Omonia	64–61	60–66	67–64	66–70	85–79	40–77	—	50–80	—	—	88–84	62–69	67–81	—	—	—
Petrolina AEK	66–56	66–56	82–76	71–55	84–64	59–70	83–77	—	75–67	84–64	93–57	—	—	—	76–59	—

Source: CBF, CBF
Legend: Blue = home team win; Red = away team win.

== Playoffs ==
=== Bracket ===
Semifinals were played in a best-of-three games, while the finals, in a best-of five one with seeded teams playing games 1, 2 and (if necessary) 5 at home.

Semifinals
Petrolina AEK	3
ETHA	0
Keravnos	3
APOEL	2

Finals
Petrolina AEK	1
Keravnos	3

=== Semifinals ===
Team 1	Series	Team 2	Game 1	Game 2	Game 3	Game 4	Game 5
Petrolina AEK	3–0	ETHA	78–70	96–72	85–68		
Keravnos	3–2	APOEL	95–94	62–73	81–90	74–80	95–83

=== Finals ===
Team 1	Series	Team 2	Game 1	Game 2	Game 3	Game 4	Game 5
Petrolina AEK	1–3	Keravnos	72–55	81–89	65–79	93-86	

== Cypriot clubs in European competitions ==
Team	Competition	Progress
Petrolina AEK	Champions League	First qualifying round
Petrolina AEK	FIBA Europe Cup	Second round
Keravnos	FIBA Europe Cup	Second qualifying round
