= Cypriot Basketball Super Cup =

Cypriot Men's Basketball Super Cup
- Sport: Basketball
- Founded: 1985
- No. of teams: 2
- Country: Cyprus
- Most recent champions: Keravnos (5th title) (2021)
- Most titles: APOEL (9 titles)
- Related competitions: Cypriot Division A Cypriot Cup
- Website: Cyprus Basketball Federation

The Cypriot Basketball Super Cup is a men's professional basketball competition in Cyprus, organized by the Cyprus Basketball Federation. It is contested by the champion of the Cypriot First Division and the winner of the Cypriot Cup.

== History ==
The first Cypriot Super Cup match was played in 1985, with AEL winning the trophy, after beating ENAD 78–75. From 195 until 1994, the competition was held under the name "Independence Shield", but in the following years it was called, the "Federation Cup". From 2005 until 2009, the competition was dedicated to the memory of the victims of the Helios Airways Flight 522 plane crash, which took place at Grammatiko, in 2005.

Over the next five years, the competition was called "Marios Papalas' Shield", and since 2015, it is called "OPAP Super Cup". As of today, nine different teams have won the Cypriot Super Cup, with APOEL being the most successful club in the tournament, having won the trophy nine times.

== Super Cup winners ==
The winners of the competition from 1985 until today are:

- 1985 – AEL
- 1986 – APOEL
- 1987 – ENAD
- 1988 – AEL
- 1989 – Not held
- 1990 – Achilleas
- 1991 – Pezoporikos
- 1992 – Achilleas
- 1993 – Achilleas
- 1994 – APOEL
- 1995 – APOEL
- 1996 – Achilleas
- 1997 – APOEL
- 1998 – APOEL
- 1999 – Keravnos
- 2000 – Keravnos
- 2001 – APOEL
- 2002 – APOEL
- 2003 – AEL
- 2004 – Apollon
- 2005 – AEL
- 2006 – AEL
- 2007 – AEL
- 2008 – AEL
- 2009 – AEL
- 2010 – APOEL
- 2011 – ETHA
- 2012 – Keravnos
- 2013 – AEK
- 2014 – APOEL
- 2015 – AEK
- 2016 – AEK
- 2017 – AEK
- 2018 – AEK
- 2019 – Keravnos
- 2021 – Keravnos
- 2022 – Keravnos
- 2023 – Keravnos

== Performance by club ==
Team	Winners	Years won
APOEL	9	1986, 1994, 1995, 1997, 1998, 2001, 2002, 2010, 2014
AEL	8	1985, 1988, 2003, 2005, 2006, 2007, 2008, 2009
Keravnos	5	1999, 2000, 2012, 2019, 2021
AEK	4	2013, 2015, 2016, 2017
Achilleas	4	1990, 1992, 1993, 1996
ETHA	1	2011
Apollon	1	2004
Pezoporikos	1	1991
ENAD	1	1987

== Topscorers ==
Year	Player	Points	Team
2010	(United States) Charron Fisher	41	APOEL B.C.
2012	(United States) Tony Crocker	30	Keravnos
2013	(United States) (Dominican Republic) Amaurys Fermin	17	ETHA Engomis
2014	(United States) Anthony Roberson	14	APOEL B.C.
2015	(United States) Trae Golden	23	ETHA Engomis
2019	(United States) Isaac Hamilton	22	AEK Larnaca
2021	(United States) Shaq Goodwin	27	AEK Larnaca
2022	(United States) Tray Buchanan	27	AEL Limassol
2023	(United States) Taveion Hollingsworth	20	AEK Larnaca
2024	(Cyprus) Simon Michael	18	Keravnos
2025	(United States) Taveion Hollingsworth	22	AEK Larnaca

== MVP Award ==
Source:eurobasket.com

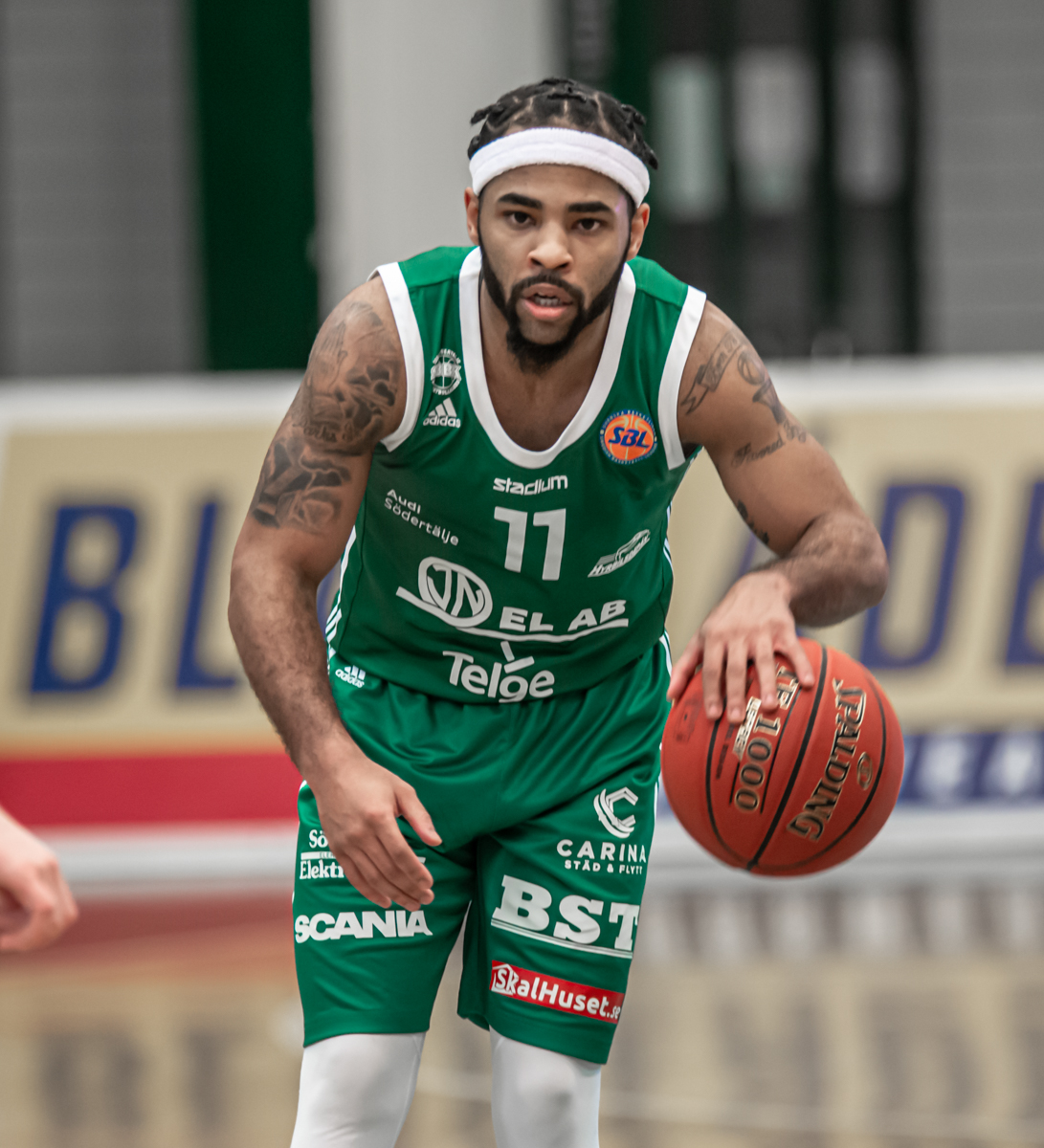
Trevin Parks was the MVP in the 2017 edition.

- 2007 - (Serbia) Milutin Aleksic - AEL Limassol
- 2010 - (United States) Charron Fisher - APOEL B.C.
- 2012 – (United States) Tony Crocker – Keravnos
- 2013 - (United States) Matt Bauscher - AEK Larnaca
- 2014 - (Cyprus) Vassilis Kounnas - APOEL B.C.
- 2016 - (United States) Alex Harris - AEK Larnaca
- 2017 – (United States) Trevin Parks – ETHA Engomis
- 2022 - (United States) (The Gambia) Ousman Krubally - Keravnos
- 2023 - (United States) Taveion Hollingsworth - AEK Larnaca

== Winning coaches ==
Head coach	Cups	Years Won	Years Lost
(Greece) Memos Ioannou	4	1997, 1998, 1999, 2000	2001, 2010
(Cyprus) Christoforos Leivadiotis	4	2019, 2021, 2023, 2025	2024
(Cyprus) George Thyrotos	2	1985, 1988	1987
(Greece) Periklis Tavropoulos	2	1995, 1996
(Greece) Michalis Kakiouzis	2	2022, 2024
(Latvia) Igors Miglinieks	2	2005, 2006
(Germany) / (Greece) Yannis Christopoulos	1	2010
(Cyprus) Antonis Toni Konstantinides	1	2011	2022
(Greece) Vassilis Fragkias	1		2006, 2007, 2008
(Cyprus) Linos Gavriel	1	2016
(Cyprus) Yiangoulis Kyriakou	1	2009
(Cyprus) Giorgos Ketsselidis	1	2015
(Cyprus) Markos Asonitis	1		2011, 2022
(Cyprus) Panagiotis Yiannaras	2	2012
(Serbia) / (Cyprus) Dragan Raca	1	2008
(United States) (Sweden) Charles Barton	1	2007
(United States) Johnny Neumann	1	1997	1994
(Greece) Charis Papazoglou	1	1999
(Cyprus) Nikos Papadopoulos	1	2014	2015, 2019, 2021
(Greece) (Netherlands) Giannis Ioannidis	1	2004
(Cyprus) Christos Stylianidis	-		2009
(Cyprus) Damalis	-		2025
(United States) (Greece) Jimmy Koustenis	-		2016
(Egypt) (Greece) Chris Chougkaz	-		2014
(Cyprus) Kyriakos Adamou	-		2012
(Cyprus) Giorgos Lambrou	-	2016	1995
(Cyprus) Charis Papazoglou	-		1997

== See also ==
- Cyprus Basketball Division A
- Cypriot Basketball Cup
