= 2020–21 Cyprus Basketball Division A =

Cyprus Basketball Division A
- Teams: 9

The 2020–21 Cyprus Basketball Division A is the 54th season of the Cyprus Basketball Division A, the top-tier level men's professional basketball league on Cyprus.

== Teams and locations ==
Locations of the 2020–21 Cyprus Basketball Division A teams

Team	City	Venue
AEL	Limassol	Nicos Solomonides Arena
APOEL	Nicosia	Lefkotheo
Apollon Limassol	Limassol	Apollon Arena
APOP	Paphos	Aphroditi Sports Hall
Omonia Nicosia	Nicosia	Agios Dhometios Indoor Hall
EN Paralimni	Paralimni	Paralimni Municipal Indoor Hall
ETHA	Engomi	Eleftheria Indoor Hall
Keravnos Strovolou	Strovolos	Costas Papaellinas Arena
Petrolina AEK	Larnaca	Kition Athletic Center

== Regular season ==
=== Championship Group ===
Pos	Team	Pld	W	L	PF	PA	PD	Pts	Qualification
1	Keravnos	20	17	3	1629	1375	+254	37	Qualification for playoffs
2	Petrolina AEK	20	15	5	1663	1396	+267	35	Qualification for playoffs
3	EN Paralimni	20	12	8	1463	1400	+63	32	Qualification for playoffs
4	APOEL	20	11	9	1530	1481	+49	31	Qualification for playoffs
5	Apollon	20	11	9	1547	1547	0	31	
6	Omonia	20	8	12	1487	1531	−44	28	

Updated to match(es) played on 08 March 2021. Source: CBF

=== Relegation Group ===
Pos	Team	Pld	W	L	PF	PA	PD	Pts	Relegation
1	APOP	18	7	11	1365	1497	−132	25	
2	ETHA	18	5	13	1196	1408	−212	23	
3	AEL	18	1	17	1189	1434	−245	19	Relegation to Division B

Updated to match(es) played on 08 March 2021. Source: CBF

== Cypriot clubs in European competitions ==
Team	Competition	Progress
Keravnos	Champions League	Regular season
