= Trevin Parks =

American basketball player (born 1991)

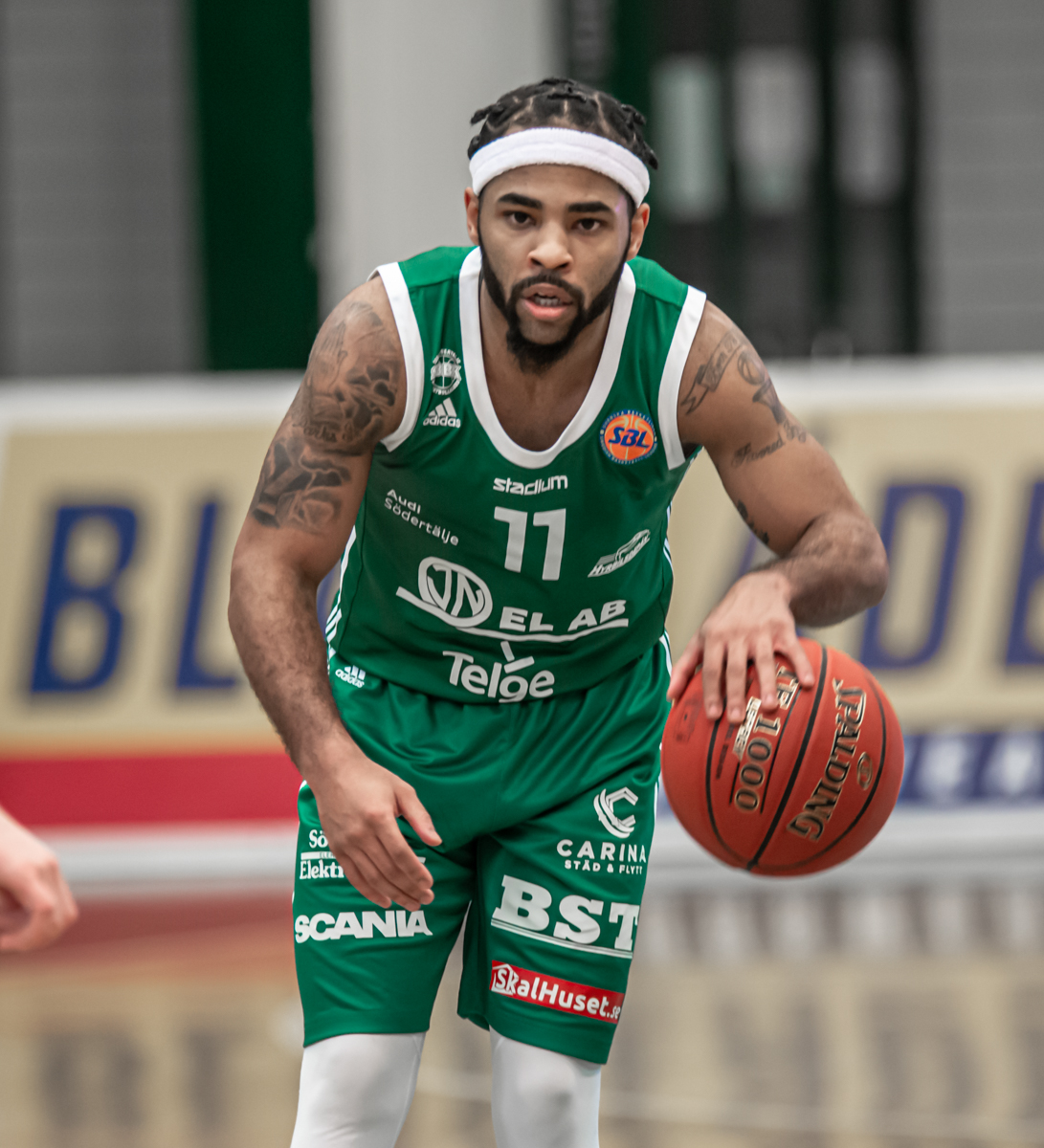
- Parks playing with Södertälje in 2021

Personal information
- Born: May 26, 1991 (age 35) Hickory, North Carolina, U.S.
- Listed height: 5 ft 11 in (1.80 m)
- Listed weight: 170 lb (77 kg)

Career information
- High school: Hickory (Hickory, North Carolina)
- College: Charlotte (2009–2010); Johnson C. Smith (2010–2013)
- NBA draft: 2013: undrafted
- Playing career: 2014–2021
- Position: Point guard

Career history
- 2014–2015: Schalke 04
- 2016: Delaware 87ers
- 2016–2017: Barsy Atyrau
- 2017–2018: Pardubice
- 2018: ETHA Engomis
- 2020–2021: Södertälje BBK

Career highlights
- Cypriot Super Cup winner (2018); Baltic League leading scorer (2017); 2× Division II All-American (2012, 2013)

Trevin Marcel Parks (born May 26, 1991) is an American former professional basketball player for Södertälje BBK of the Basketligan. He played college basketball for UNC Charlotte and Johnson C. Smith, being named a Division II All-American twice.

== High school career ==
Parks attended Hickory High School under head coach Shawn Johnson, averaging 24 points, three rebounds and five assists as a senior, leading the Red Tornadoes to a 26–3 record and a sectional championship game. He finished his high school career with 1,461 points and on his three years at Hickory, they had a 72-17 combined record that included Catawba Valley Athletic 2A-3A Conference regular-season titles in 2008 and 2009.

== College career ==
Parks began his career at UNC Charlotte, where he played sparingly in his freshman season. The next year, despite the interest of several DI schools, he transferred to Johnson C. Smith to not have to sit out a year per NCAA rules.

As a sophomore, Parks averaged 21.3 points, 4.4 assists and 2.7 rebounds per game and became the first ever player in Smith's history to be the CIAA Player of the Year. He followed that up with 22 points and 3.8 assists per game as a junior and 25 points and 4.1 assists as a senior, earning All-American status in D-II basketball each season.

== Professional career ==
After graduating, Parks attended workouts for the Charlotte Bobcats, Orlando Magic and Brooklyn Nets, however, he still went undrafted in the 2013 NBA draft. On July 31, 2014, he signed with German club FC Schalke 04 for the 2014–2015 season.

On February 2, 2016, Parks was acquired by the Delaware 87ers of the NBA Development League. The next day, he made his debut for the 87ers in a 100–97 loss to the Erie BayHawks, recording two points, one rebound and one assist in nine minutes. On February 19, he was waived by Delaware.

On September 6, 2018, he joined ETHA Engomis of the Cypriot League. On July 31, 2020, Parks signed with Södertälje Kings of the Basketligan.

== Personal life ==
He is the son of Inesha Parks and Tyrone Wray. His uncle, Patrick Tate, played football at North Carolina.
