= Kalia Papadopoulou =

Personal information
- Born: 15 March 1980 (age 46) Limassol, Cyprus
- Listed height: 166 cm (5 ft 5 in)

Career information
- Playing career: 1993–2016
- Position: Point Guard
- Coaching career: 2022–present

Career history

Playing
- 1993–1998: AEL Limassol B.C. (women)
- 1998–2001: GS Megas Alexandros
- 2001–2003: A.P.O. Thermaikos Thermis
- 2003–2005: APS Siemens
- 2005–2008: AEL Limassol B.C. (women)
- 2008–2009: Laveyrone Drôme
- 2009–2010: O.A. Chanion
- 2010–2011: Keravnos B.C.
- 2011–2016: AEL Limassol B.C. (women)

Coaching
- 2017–2022: AEL Limassol B.C. (women)
- 2022–: AEL Limassol B.C.

Kalia Papadopoulou (born 15 March 1980) is a Cypriot former basketball player and current basketball coach of the men's team of AEL Limassol B.C.

Standing at 1.66 m tall, she played as a point guard and shooting guard. For three consecutive years she was awarded as the best Cypriot basketball player by the Cyprus Basketball Federation, making her one of the most important personalities for the sport on the island.

== Career ==
Papadopoulou started her career in 1993 playing for AEL Limassol. In 1998 she moved to Greece to play for Mega Alexandros Thessaloniki.

For two years she played for Thermaikos Thermi, winning the 2002–2003 Women's A2 National Championship. She then played for A.P.S. Siemens, where in 17 games she had amassed an average of 7.6 points and 4.8 rebounds per game.

Papadopoulou returned to AEL Limassol from 2005 to 2008, winning three championships and two Cyprus Cups, but retiring in an uneventful manner.

During the 2008-2009 season Papadopoulou played in the French league for Laveiron Drom. In the autumn of 2009 she returned to Greece, becoming a member of the O.A. Chania team. In the summer of 2010 Papadopoulou returned to Cyprus this time playing for Keravnos Strovolos.

Following her individual performances during the 2010–11 season, she was awarded as the Top Female Basketball Player of the Year by the Cyprus Basketball Federation.

Papadopoulou was also a key member of the Cyprus Women's National Team.
