= Derek Ogbeide =

Nigerian-Canadian basketball player (born 1997)

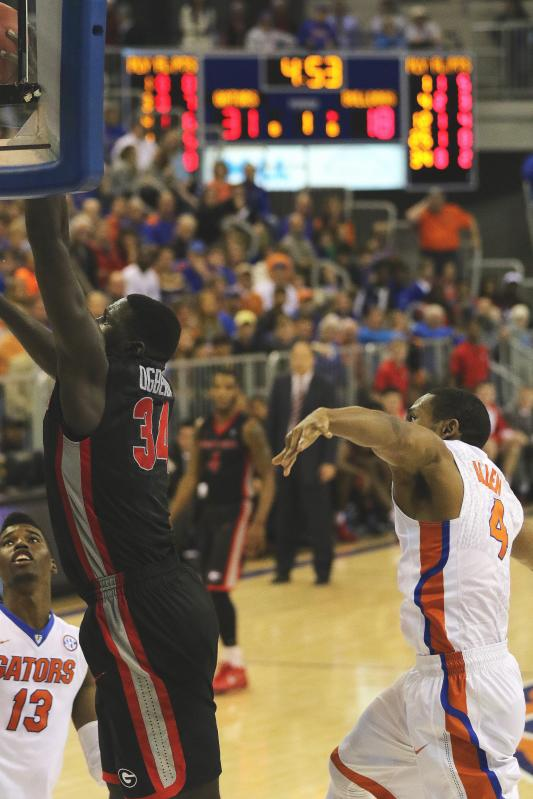
- Ogbeide in action with Georgia

No. 34 – Pallacanestro Reggiana
- Position: Center
- League: LBA

Personal information
- Born: March 28, 1997 (age 29) Lagos, Nigeria
- Listed height: 6 ft 9 in (2.06 m)
- Listed weight: 250 lb (113 kg)

Career information
- High school: Pebblebrook (Mableton, Georgia)
- College: Georgia (2015–2019)
- NBA draft: 2019: undrafted
- Playing career: 2019–present

Career history
- 2019–2021: AEK Larnaca
- 2021: Hapoel Eilat
- 2021–2022: PAOK Thessaloniki
- 2022: Konyaspor
- 2022–2023: Rimini
- 2023–2024: Pistoia
- 2024: Cedevita Olimpija
- 2024–2025: Hapoel Jerusalem
- 2025: Trapani Shark
- 2025–2026: San Diego Clippers
- 2026: Grand Rapids Gold
- 2026–present: Reggiana

Career highlights
- Cypriot League MVP (2021); Cypriot League champion (2021); Cypriot Cup winner (2021)

Derek Ikumalo "Ik" Ogbeide (born March 28, 1997) is a Nigerian-Canadian professional basketball player for Reggio Emilia of the Italian Lega Basket Serie A (LBA). He played college basketball for the Georgia Bulldogs.

== High school career ==
Ogbeide played in grade 9 and 10 for Monsignor Percy Johnson Catholic Secondary School in Toronto, Canada. Ogbeide played for Pebblebrook High School, at Mableton, Georgia in grade 11 and 12. As a senior, he averaged 14.8 points, 10.2 rebounds, and 4.5 blocks per game; he was named first-team All-State for Class 6A by HoopSeen.com, and second-team by both the Atlanta Journal-Constitution and the Georgia Sports Writers Association.

== College career ==
Ogbeide played at University of Georgia from 2015-2019. During his first year, he missed the first five games of the season due to a right shoulder injury suffered in practice shortly after the exhibition contest. He finished second on the team in rebounding and blocked shots. During his sophomore year, he was a starter for 33 of 34 games. He ranked number five in the SEC in rebounding (7.6 rebounds per game) as well as number three in stats for SEC games. He wrapped up his four -year college career ranked among Georgia's all-time leaders in field goal percentage (54.6%) and shot an impressive 55.6 percent from the field in SEC games for the Bulldogs.

== Professional career ==
Ogbeide started his professional with AEK Larnaca of the Cypriot League. After a successful first season with AEK, he renewed his contract with the team for one more season. During his second season, he averaged 14.0 points, 10.3 rebounds {8th in the league), and 1.2 blocks (2nd) per game while shooting 63.8% from the field, and won the Cypriot Cup with AEK Larnaca.

On May 27, 2021, he joined Israeli club Hapoel Eilat till the end of the season.

On June 27, 2021, Ogbeide officially signed with PAOK of the Greek Basket League and the Basketball Champions League. On January 8, 2022, he mutually parted ways with the Greek club. In 8 Greek league games, Ogbeide averaged 6.4 points and 3.4 rebounds per contest, while in 7 BCL matches he put up a stat sheet of merely 3.1 points and 2.9 rebounds per game.

On January 10, 2022, he signed with Torku Konyaspor of the Turkish Basketball First League. He averaged 13.7 points, 8.0 rebounds {9th in the league), and 1.3 blocks (4th) per game while shooting 64.5% from the field.

In 2022 he signed for Rinascita Basket Rimini of the Serie A2. He averaged 15.5 points, 8.8 rebounds {5th in the league), and 0.8 blocks (9th) per game while shooting 58.8% from the field.

On July 6, 2023, he signed with Pistoia Basket 2000 of the Lega Basket Serie A (LBA). He averaged 11.0 points, 8.0 rebounds {2nd in the league), and 1.1 blocks (6th) per game while shooting 63.0% from the field.

On July 28, 2024, he signed with Cedevita Olimpija of the Slovenian Basketball League and ABA League.

On November 3, 2024, he signed with Hapoel Jerusalem of the Israeli Basketball Premier League and the EuroCup for the rest of the season.

On 20 April 2025, he was signed by Italian club Trapani Shark.

On June 27, 2026, he signed with Reggio Emilia of the Italian Lega Basket Serie A (LBA).

== Personal life ==
Ogbeide is the son of Martin and Tina Ogbeide. He was born in Lagos, Nigeria but has since lived in London, Sweden, Nigeria, Atlanta, Maryland, and Canada before moving back to Atlanta.
