= George Thyrotos =

Georgios Thyrotos
No. #15 – AEL Limassol B.C.

Personal information
- Born: 1954 Limassol, Cyprus
- Died: 8 January 2002 (aged 47–48) Limassol, Cyprus

Career information
- Playing career: 1967–1987
- Position: Point guard
- Coaching career: 1980–2002

Career history

Playing
- 1967–1987: AEL Limassol B.C.

Coaching
- 1980–1989: AEL Limassol B.C.
- 1989–1992: Keravnos B.C.
- 1992–1995: AEL Limassol B.C.
- 1995–1997: Esperos B.C.
- 1997–1998 (caretaker): AEL Limassol B.C.
- 2000–2002: Apollon Limassol B.C.

Giorgos Thyrotos (1954 – 8 January 2002) was a Cypriot international basketball player and coach from Limassol, a leading figure of AEL Limassol and the Cyprus national team. He played at the point guard position.

== Biography ==
=== Early life and career beginnings ===
In 1967, at the age of 13, he joined the AEL Limassol's youth team under the guidance of his mentor, Michalakis Nikolaidis. He became a member of the men's team at 14, a key player at 15 and an international at 16. He started his career as a shooting guard, but then developed into a cerebral and intelligent point guard, one of the best Cypriot basketball has ever produced.

=== Playing career ===
He was the captain of the basketball team of A.E. Limassol during the golden decade of 1970–1980. He celebrated eight Cyprus Championships, six Cups and two Shields. Since 1980 he maintained the dual role of coach-player in the team.

He played for the first time in the colours of the National Cyprus team at the age of 16 against the Mixed team of Thessaloniki at the Alexandrio Stadium. He was captain of the National Team from its reactivation (mid-70s) until the end of his career. He completed a 17-year career with the national team, having participated in three EuroBasket Challenge Rounds, and celebrated a gold medal at the first European Small Nations Games in 1985 in San Marino.

=== Coaching career ===
He retired as a player in 1987, ending his career with Monaco side A.M.C.E. Since 1988 he worked exclusively as a coach, taking over the team of Keravnos B.C. He remained there for about 3.5 years before returning to Limassol. At the same time he worked as a physical education teacher in secondary schools.

He was the coach of the Cyprus men's and women's national teams in the sport. A year before his death he worked as a technical advisor and assistant coach for the men's team of Apollon Limassol, while the following year he was the coach of the girls' team of the same team.

He also served as President of the Cyprus Basketball Coaches Association.

=== Death ===
He died on January 8, 2002, at 2 a.m., at the age of 48, of a heart attack. He was married with two children.

AEL Limassol, honoring his memory, gave his name to the street where its the team's home ground (Nicos Solomonides Arena) is located, which is adorned with his jersey with the number 15.

== Honours ==
=== As a player ===
- AEL Limassol: 3 Championships (1974, 1978, 1980) and 2 Cups (1978, 1980)
- Cyprus National Team: 1 gold medal in A.M.K.E. (1985).

In 1974 he was named "Top Cypriot Athlete of the Year" by the E.A.K. and three other times he was voted by sports editors as the best basketball player of the year (1978, 1980, 1981).

=== As player-coach ===
- AEL Limassol: 4 National Championships (1982, 1983, 1985, 1987), 3 Cups (1981, 1982, 1983), 1 Super Cup (1985)

=== As head coach ===
- AEL Limassol: 1 Championship (1988), 1 Super Cup (1988) Women's National Team: 3 bronze medals in A.M.K.E. (1991, 1993, 1997).
