= Apollon BC =

Apollon B.C. may refer to two basketball clubs:

- Apollon Patras B.C., Greek team
- Apollon Limassol BC, Cypriot team
