= Karim Souchu =

French basketball player

SLUC Nancy
- Position: Shooting guard / small forward
- League: LNB Pro A Eurocup

Personal information
- Born: 30 March 1979 (age 47) Senlis
- Listed height: 6 ft 6 in (1.98 m)
- Listed weight: 213 lb (97 kg)

Career information
- College: Furman (1999–2003)
- NBA draft: 2003: undrafted
- Playing career: 1998–present

Career history
- 1998–1999: Dijon
- 2003–2005: ASVEL
- 2005–2007: Liège
- 2007–2008: AEL Limassol
- 2008–2009: Chorale Roanne
- 2009–2011: Limoges CSP
- 2011: Chorale Roanne
- 2012: STB Le Havre
- 2012–2013: Cholet
- 2013–2014: Poitiers
- 2015–present: SLUC Nancy
Medals
Karim Souchu
Medal record
Representing France
Basketball 3x3
World Championship
Silver medal – second place	2012 Athens	Men's

Karim Souchu (born 30 March 1979 in Senlis, France) is a French basketball player currently playing for SLUC Nancy of the LNB Pro A.
