= Cyprus Basketball Federation =

Governing body for basketball on the island of Cyprus

- Sport: Basketball
- Jurisdiction: Cyprus
- Abbreviation: CBF
- Founded: 1966
- Affiliation: FIBA
- Regional affiliation: FIBA Europe
- Headquarters: Nikosia
- President: Andreas Mouzourides

Official website
- www.cbf.basketball
- (Cyprus)

The Cyprus Basketball Federation (CBF) (Greek: Κυπριακή Ομοσπονδία Καλαθοοσφαίρισης (ΚΟΚ)) is the governing body for basketball on the island of Cyprus and is a division of the Cyprus Sport Organisation (ΚΟΑ-Κυπριακός Οργανισμός Αθλητισμού). It was established in 1966 and became a full member of FIBA in 1974.

It is responsible for representing Cyprus on the international stage and for running the national teams that represent Cyprus at all levels.

Currently it runs:

- Three national men's leagues:

OPAP Basket League
Division B1
Division B2

- The yearly Cypriot Basketball Cup (that employs a knockout format)
- The yearly Cypriot Super Cup (Champion vs Cup Winner match)
- One national Women's League

== History of Basketball in Cyprus ==
Cyprus has a total population of around 800,000 most of whom follow the sport of basketball. In terms of popularity and spectator following, basketball only comes second to football.

The history of basketball in Cyprus can be roughly categorized into 3 periods (1966 to 1974, 1974 to 1988 and 1988 to today). Up to and including 1974 the most successful teams on the island were Digenis Morphou and PAEEK. As a direct result of the Turkish invasion both teams were expelled from their home towns; an event which had obvious catastrophic consequences.

The immediate aftermath of the invasion was a period of economic suffering for all aspects of society including sport and basketball itself. Investment in sport development, infrastructure and foreign expertise (players and coaches) became of secondary importance. However, the triumph of Greece in the Eurobasket 1987 tournament sparked a renewed interest in the sport which brought in young players and the beginnings of a much needed investment. Foreign players soon followed and new arenas were constructed to cover the thousands of fans flocking to the top division games.

Until the early 80's most games were held on open courts with a tarmac floor and a wooden backboard. But by the end of the decade KOA (Cyprus Sports Authority) had invested in several modern indoor arenas. Stadiums were erected in every city and venues such as the Eleftheria" in Nicosia, “Kition” in Larnaca, AEL arena and Apollon stadium in Limassol now meet modern international standards where European competition matches are regularly held.

Except of the men's championship there is also a teenager's league (U-20). The teams that take part in the men's league also take part in the U-20 league. There is also women's championship with 6 teams, U-16 boys and girl's championship. Most of the teams also have basketball academies were young children go and learn the game.

Basketball in Cyprus is a developing sport. People are attending games, and interest from the press and fans is increasing. Cyprus will host the EuroBasket 2025.

== Leagues ==
=== Cyprus Basketball Division A ===
Ten teams have won the league so far:

- AEL (13)
- APOEL (11)
- Achilleas (5)
- Keravnos (5)
- Pezoporikos (4)
- Digenis (3)
- PAEEK (3)
- ENAD (2)
- ETHA (2)
- AEK (4)

== Cups ==
=== Cypriot Basketball Cup ===
Eight teams have won the cup so far:

- APOEL (11)
- AEL (9)
- Keravnos (9)
- Achilleas (7)
- Pezoporikos (5)
- ETHA (2)
- Apollon (2)
- ENAD (1)
- AEK

=== Cypriot Basketball Super Cup ===
Nine teams have won the super cup so far:

- APOEL (9)
- AEL (8)
- Achilleas (4)
- Keravnos (3)
- AEK (1)
- ETHA (1)
- Apollon (1)
- Pezoporikos (1)
- ENAD (1)
