= 2006–07 FIBA EuroCup =

FIBA EuroCup
- Season: 2006–07
- Teams: 31

Finals
- Champions: (Spain) Akasvayu Girona; 1st title
- Runners-up: (Ukraine) Azovmash Mariupol
- Third place: (Italy) Virtus Bologna
- Fourth place: (Spain) Estudiantes
- Final Four MVP: (United States) Ariel McDonald

Statistical leaders
Points	(United States) Erwin Dudley	21.4
Rebounds	(Lithuania) Tadas Klimavicius	9.0
Assists	(France) Laurent Sciarra	8.9

The 2006–07 FIBA EuroCup was a professional basketball tournament in Europe. The competition regarded as the third-strongest pan-European club basketball competition featured 31 teams of which 5 were domestic champions. Akasvayu Girona became the champion, after beating Azovmash Mariupol in the final.

== Teams ==
Regular season
(Russia) Dynamo Moscow Region (6th)	(Spain) Akasvayu Girona (7th)	(Turkey) Türk Telekom (4th)	(Latvia) Barons (2nd)
(Russia) Ural Great Perm (7th)	(Spain) MMT Estudiantes (8th)	(Turkey) Banvit (5th)	(Latvia) ASK Rīga (3rd)
(Russia) Lokomotiv Rostov (8th)	(France) Adecco ASVEL (5th)	(Israel) Maccabi Rishon LeZion (3rd)	(Estonia) Kalev (1st)
(Czech Republic) ČEZ Nymburk (1st)	(France) JDA Dijon (11th)	(Israel) Ironi Nahariya (4th)	(Lithuania) Siauliai (3rd)
(Serbia) Vojvodina Srbijagas (5th)	(Italy) Virtus Bologna (9th)	(Greece) Maroussi Honda (3rd)	(Romania) Asesoft Ploiești (1st)
(Ukraine) Kyiv (2nd)	(Belgium) Liège (4th)	(Greece) Panionios Forthnet (8th)	(Hungary) Atomerőmű SE (1st)
(Ukraine) Khimik (3rd)	(Belgium) Spirou Charleroi (5th)	(Cyprus) AEL Limassol (1st)	(Netherlands) Amsterdam Astronauts (3rd)
(Bulgaria) CSKA Sofia (6th)

== Round I ==
=== Group A ===
Pos	Team	Pld	W	L	PF	PA	PD	Qualification
1	(Spain) MMT Estudiantes	6	5	1	551	524	+27	Advance to Round II
2	(France) JDA Dijon	6	4	2	496	475	+21	Advance to Round II
3	(Israel) Ironi Nahariya	6	3	3	513	505	+8	
4	(Romania) CSU Asesoft Ploiești	6	0	6	519	575	−56	

Source: FIBA Europe

=== Group B ===
Pos	Team	Pld	W	L	PF	PA	PD	Qualification
1	(Russia) Dynamo Moscow Region	6	5	1	470	396	+74	Advance to Round II
2	(Belgium) Spirou Charleroi	6	4	2	418	409	+9	Advance to Round II
3	(Ukraine) Khimik	6	3	3	457	467	−10	
4	(Latvia) Barons	6	0	6	384	457	−73	

Source: FIBA Europe

=== Group C ===
Pos	Team	Pld	W	L	PF	PA	PD	Qualification
1	(Russia) Lokomotiv Rostov	6	4	2	451	397	+54	Advance to Round II
2	(Ukraine) Azovmash Mariupol	6	4	2	454	417	+37	Advance to Round II
3	(Turkey) Banvit	6	4	2	456	414	+42	
4	(Hungary) Atomerőmű SE	6	0	6	379	512	−133	

Source: FIBA Europe

=== Group D ===
Pos	Team	Pld	W	L	PF	PA	PD	Qualification
1	(Spain) Akasvayu Girona	6	6	0	519	432	+87	Advance to Round II
2	(Lithuania) Šiauliai	6	2	4	494	502	−8	Advance to Round II
3	(France) BCM Gravelines	6	2	4	479	522	−43	
4	(Israel) Maccabi Rishon LeZion	6	2	4	452	488	−36	

Source: FIBA Europe

=== Group E ===
Pos	Team	Pld	W	L	PF	PA	PD	Qualification
1	(Belgium) Belgacom Liège	4	3	1	293	261	+32	Advance to Round II
2	(Estonia) Kalev	4	2	2	283	284	−1	Advance to Round II
3	(Ukraine) Kyiv	4	1	3	277	308	−31	

Source: FIBA Europe

=== Group F ===
Pos	Team	Pld	W	L	PF	PA	PD	Qualification
1	(Greece) Maroussi Honda	6	5	1	452	411	+41	Advance to Round II
2	(Latvia) ASK Rīga	6	3	3	450	449	+1	Advance to Round II
3	(Czech Republic) ČEZ Nymburk	6	3	3	454	460	−6	
4	(Serbia) Vojvodina Srbijagas	6	1	5	419	455	−36	

Source: FIBA Europe

=== Group G ===
Pos	Team	Pld	W	L	PF	PA	PD	Qualification
1	(Turkey) Türk Telekom	6	5	1	506	470	+36	Advance to Round II
2	(Greece) Panionios Forthnet	6	4	2	487	446	+41	Advance to Round II
3	(Russia) Ural Great Perm	6	2	4	461	490	−29	
4	(Bulgaria) CSKA Sofia	6	1	5	474	522	−48	

Source: FIBA Europe

=== Group H ===
Pos	Team	Pld	W	L	PF	PA	PD	Qualification
1	(Italy) Virtus Bologna	6	5	1	540	404	+136	Advance to Round II
2	(Cyprus) EKA AEL Limassol	6	4	2	494	454	+40	Advance to Round II
3	(France) Adecco ASVEL	6	3	3	495	456	+39	
4	(Netherlands) Amsterdam Astronauts	6	0	6	361	576	−215	

Source: FIBA Europe

== Round II ==
=== Group I ===
Pos	Team	Pld	W	L	PF	PA	PD	Qualification
1	(Spain) MMT Estudiantes	6	5	1	488	419	+69	Advance to Quarterfinals
2	(Cyprus) EKA AEL Limassol	6	5	1	449	418	+31	Advance to Quarterfinals
3	(Belgium) Belgacom Liège	6	1	5	462	511	−49	
4	(Lithuania) Šiauliai	6	1	5	490	541	−51	

Source: FIBA Europe

=== Group J ===
Pos	Team	Pld	W	L	PF	PA	PD	Qualification
1	(Ukraine) Azovmash Mariupol	6	5	1	457	395	+62	Advance to Quarterfinals
2	(Russia) Dynamo Moscow Region	6	4	2	429	393	+36	Advance to Quarterfinals
3	(Latvia) ASK Riga	6	3	3	413	476	−63	
4	(Greece) Maroussi Honda	6	0	6	427	462	−35	

Source: FIBA Europe

=== Group K ===
Pos	Team	Pld	W	L	PF	PA	PD	Qualification
1	(Turkey) Türk Telekom	6	5	1	471	452	+19	Advance to Quarterfinals
2	(Greece) Panionios Forthnet	6	3	3	426	405	+21	Advance to Quarterfinals
3	(Russia) Lokomotiv Rostov	6	3	3	429	431	−2	
4	(Belgium) Spirou Charleroi	6	1	5	413	451	−38	

Source: FIBA Europe

=== Group L ===
Pos	Team	Pld	W	L	PF	PA	PD	Qualification
1	(Spain) Akasvayu Girona	6	6	0	592	487	+105	Advance to Quarterfinals
2	(Italy) Virtus Bologna	6	4	2	530	508	+22	Advance to Quarterfinals
3	(France) JDA Dijon	6	2	4	470	534	−64	
4	(Estonia) Kalev	6	0	6	453	516	−63	

Source: FIBA Europe

== Quarterfinals ==
Team 1	Agg.	Team 2	1st leg	2nd leg	3rd leg
Dynamo Moscow Region (Russia)	0–2	(Spain) MMT Estudiantes	70–80	74–78	
Virtus Bologna (Italy)	2–0	(Turkey) Türk Telekom	95–87	59–54	
Akasvayu Girona (Spain)	2–1	(Greece) Panionios Forthnet	76–68	69–82	83–49
Azovmash Mariupol (Ukraine)	2–1	(Cyprus) EKA AEL Limassol	88–63	79–85	97–69

== Final four ==
Semi finals
(Spain) Akasvayu Girona	89
(Spain) MMT Estudiantes	58
(Ukraine) Azovmash Mariupol	74
(Italy) Virtus Bologna	73

Final
(Spain) Akasvayu Girona	79
(Ukraine) Azovmash Mariupol	72
3rd place
(Spain) MMT Estudiantes	62
(Italy) Virtus Bologna	80
