= Marios Moniatis =

Cypriot basketball player

No. 13 – AEL Limassol
- Position: Point guard
- League: Cyprus Basketball Division 1

Personal information
- Born: 7 May 1996 (age 30) Limassol, Cyprus
- Listed height: 6 ft 0 in (1.83 m)

Career information
- Playing career: 2011–present

Career history
- 2011–present: AEL Limassol B.C.

Marios Moniatis (born 7 May 1996) is a Cypriot professional basketball player who currently plays for and captains the men's team of AEL Limassol B.C. in the Cyprus Basket League and the Balkan International Basketball League.

== Career ==
His main playing position is that of point guard and has played for only one club in his entire career.
