= 2023–24 BIBL season =

2023–24 BIBL
- League: Balkan International Basketball League
- Season: 2023–24
- Dates: 15 November 2023 – 25 March 2024 (regular season)
- Teams: 6
- TV partner(s): CyBC

Finals
- Champions: Sigal Prishtina
- Runners-up: PYABL EKA AEL
- Semifinalists: KB Peja, KK Lóvcen 1947

Seasons
- ← 2022–23 2024–25 →
- All statistics correct as of 7 October 2025.

The 2023–24 BIBL season is the 16th edition of Balkan International Basketball League (BIBL). Teams from Montenegro, Kosovo and the newly represented country Cyprus are participating in this year’s competition.

== Format ==
The Balkan International Basketball League introduced a new, simplified competition format. Under this format, the competition will now feature a total of five teams and the tournament will divided into two phases: the Regular Season, whereby all participating teams will play each other in a double round robin both at home and away. Following the regular season's conclusion, the top four placed teams will qualify to the Final Four to determine the 2023–24 BIBL Balkan League champions.

== Teams ==
Regular Season
(Kosovo) KB Prishtina	(Montenegro) KK Lovćen 1947	(Cyprus) PAYABL EKA AEL
(Kosovo) KB Peja	(Montenegro) KK Pljevlja	

== Regular season ==
Pos	Team	Pld	W	L	PF	PA	PD	Pts	Qualification
1	Sigal Prishtina	8	6	2	725	630	+95	14	Advance to Final Four
2	PAYABL EKA AEL	8	5	3	635	552	+83	13	Advance to Final Four
3	KB Peja	8	5	3	694	653	+41	13	Advance to Final Four
4	KK Lovćen 1947	8	4	4	597	630	−33	12	Advance to Final Four
5	KK Pljevlja	8	0	8	539	725	−186	8	

== Final Four ==
Semi-finals
2024
(Kosovo) Prishtina	89
(Montenegro) Lovćen	69
2024
(Kosovo) Peja	94
(Cyprus) AEL	99

Final
2024
(Kosovo) Prishtina	72
(Cyprus) AEL	67
Third place
2024
(Kosovo) Peja	93
(Montenegro) Lovćen	82
