= 2009 FIBA EuroChallenge Final Four =

Tournament details
- Arena: Futureshow Station; Bologna, Italy
- Dates: April 2009

Final positions
- Champions: (Italy) BolognaFiere Virtus (1st title)
- Runners-up: (France) Cholet
- Third place: (Russia) Triumph Lyubertsy
- Fourth place: (Cyprus) Proteas EKA AEL

Awards and statistics
- MVP: N/A

The 2009 FIBA EuroChallenge Final Four was the concluding tournament of the 2008–09 FIBA EuroChallenge. BolognaFiere Virtus won its first title.

== Bracket ==
Semi-finals
(France) Cholet | 81
(Russia) Triumph Lyubertsy | 78
(Italy) BolognaFiere Virtus | 83
(Cyprus) Proteas EKA AEL | 69

Final
(France) Cholet | 75
(Italy) BolognaFiere Virtus | 77
Third place
(Russia) Triumph Lyubertsy | 94
(Cyprus) Proteas EKA AEL | 82

== Final standings ==
| | Team |
|---|---|
| Gold medal | (Italy) BolognaFiere Virtus |
| Silver medal | (France) Cholet |
| Bronze medal | (Russia) Triumph Lyubertsy |
| | (Cyprus) Proteas EKA AEL |
