= Dragan Raca =

Serbian basketball coach

Personal information
- Born: 3 March 1961 (age 65) Bosansko Grahovo, PR Bosnia-Herzegovina, FPR Yugoslavia

Career information
- Playing career: 1982–2002
- Position: Head coach
- Coaching career: 2002–present

Career history

Playing
- 1982–1984: OKK Šabac
- 1984–1986: Kvarner
- 1986–1989: Šibenka
- 1989–1990: Prvi partizan
- 1990–1991: ETHA Engomis
- 1991–1992: AEK Larnaca
- 1992–1993: Aris Limassol
- 1993–2000: Keravnos
- 2000–2001: Achilleas Kaimakli
- 2001–2002: AEL Limassol

Coaching
- 2002–2005: AEL Limassol
- 2005: Sagesse - Al Hekmeh
- 2005–2006: Iraklis Thessaloniki
- 2006–2007: APOEL
- 2008: Olympias Patras
- 2009: AEL Limassol B.C.
- 2010–2019: Guangzhou Free Man/Chongqing Fly Dragons/Beijing Fly Dragons
- 2004–2005: Cyprus
- 2005: Andorra
- 2007–2009: Lebanon
- 2016–2017: North Macedonia
- 2020-2021: Shandong Heroe (assistant)
- 2021-2024: Wuhan Dangda

Career highlights
- As player: Cypriot League Champion (1996, 1997, 2000); Cypriot Cup Winner (1997–1999)

Dragan Raca (Serbian Cyrillic: Драган Раца; born 3 March 1961) is a Cypriot–Serbian basketball coach and former player. He is the former coach of the national basketball teams of Lebanon, Cyprus and North Macedonia national basketball team. Most recently, he was the head coach of the Wuhan Dangdai in the Chinese Basketball Association.

Dragan Raca spent his professional career playing for Yugoslavia professional teams: KK Knin, BC December 22 - Belgrade, KK Zorka - Sabac, KK Sibenka - Sibenik. He continued his career in Cyprus in AEL - Limassol.

He was building a professional coaching career in Cyprus, Greece, Lebanon, Macedonia and China. He trained Cypriot AEL and Apoel, as well as Lebanese Hekmeh. Dragan Raca was named the best young coach in Europe by FIBA in 2002, and in 2005 FIBA named him the best coach in club competitions under her auspices. With the Cypriot national team, which he led in 2004-2005, he won the gold medal at the 2005 Games of the Small States of Europe in Andorra in 2005 without losing a game.

He coached the basketball team of Lebanon at the Asian Championships in 2007 and 2009 and won a silver medal at the 2007 championship. He is the winner of the silver medal at the William Jones Cup in Taiwan in 2007 and 2008. At the 2009 Chinese Championship, he was placed in the 2010 World Cup in Turkey.

He was the supervisor and coordinator of projects supported by China's Guangxi Teachers Education University and Guangxi University of Science and Technology, as well as 12 other faculties in China, cooperating with universities in the US, Australia and Russia.

== Education ==
Honorary Doctoral degree Alfa BK University - for his exceptional contribution in the field of sports, sports management, training technology, university education in the field of sports science, and humanitarian activities in the territory of Europe, Asia and America.

Basketball University of Belgrade (Highest Level)

University of mathematics and natural science in Belgrade.

Languages: English, Russian, Greek, Ex-Yugoslav republic languages

== Playing career ==
Career player Dragan Raca spent in the following basketball clubs:

Zorka Sabac, Kvarner, Sibenik, First Partizan, Etea, AEK, Aris, Keravnos, Ahileas, AEL

He played for the representation of Cyprus from 1994 to 1999.

Achievements:

Three times best scorer of former Yugoslavia A1

Four times best scorer of Cyprus A1 and the best scorer in the history of Cyprus basketball

== Coaching career ==
=== Coaching career – clubs ===
China

Wuhan Dangdai NBL (2021-2024)

Shandong Heroes CBA (2020)

Beijing Fly Dragons CBA (2015–2019)

Chongqing Fly Dragons CBA (2013–2015)

Guangzhou Free Man NBL (2010–2013)

Cyprus

AEL (A1), 2008–2009.

Greece

Olimpias Patra (A1), 2007–2008.

Cyprus

Apoel (A1), 2007.

Lebanon

Sageze (A1), 2006.

Greece

Iraklis (A1), 2005.

Cyprus

AEL (A1), 2002-2005.

=== Coaching career - National teams ===
Coach of Cyprus 2004-2005. With the Cypriot national team, he won a gold medal at the 2005 Games of the Small States of Europe in Andorra, without a lost game.

Coach of the national team of Lebanon 2007–2009. Silver Medal winner of the 2007 Asian Championship in Japan of 16 teams and thus won the right to participate in the FIBA Olympic Qualification Tournament Beijing - China 2008.

Winner of the Silver Medal at the Williams Jones Cup in 2007 in China. At the Asian Championship in China in 2009 he qualified for the 2010 World Cup in Turkey.

Macedonian national coach 2016–2017.

== Personal ==
Both his daughters Tiana and Ivana, are basketball players.

== Achievements ==
As coach of Eka-AEL (Cyprus)

Champion of Cyprus (Eka-AEL) – club won the title after 15 years
Winner Championship season 2002/2003 – best defensive team (average 62 points)
Winner Championship season 2003/2004 – best defensive team (average 65 points) – best offensive team (86 points) – only one lost game in season
Winner Championship season 2004/2005-best defensive team (average 68 points)
Winner of the National Cup-after 18 years Season 2003/2004-no lost game
Winner of Super cup Season 2003/2004+ FIBA Euroleague-best defensive team (average 61 points)
Winner of FIBA Euro Challenge Cup Season 2002/2003 (10 straight victories in 10 games – unbeaten record)
Nominated for the Coach of the year in all sports in Cyprus in 2003, 2004, 2005
Nominated for The best basketball coach in Cyprus in 2003, 2004, 2005, 2008, 2009.

As coach of SAGESSE (Lebanon)

Sagesse (Lebanon) (13 games – 11 victories), best defensive team season 2005/2006
National cup finalist and finalist of Championship

As coach of APOEL NOCOSIA (Cyprus)

Finalist of Championship Season 2007
Best defensive team (average 65 points)
WINNER – SUPER CUP 2008/2009
WINNER – NATIONAL CUP 2008/2009
AEL Proteas EKA – 1st Place after regular season
Best defensive team (average 67 points) – regular season
Best offensive team (average 88 points) – regular season

== Awards ==
- The Best Rookie Fiba Coach Europe – nominated by FIBA in 2003.
- The Best European FIBA COACH – officially nominated by FIBA in Munich (June 2004)
- The Best Coach Of The Year Eurobasket All League (2004)
- Coach Of The European Team ( All star game) Europe vs. Rest of the world – Kyiv 2004
- Coach Of The European Team ( All star game) Europe vs. Rest of the world – Nicosia 2005
- Winner Of Super League FIBA Asian 2005/2006.
- The Best Coach Of Super League FIBA Asian 2005/2006

His method for physical preparation is officially approved by Indiana University in USA.

== Other achievements ==
Counsellor, professor and instructor in the coaches schools

Supervisor and organizer of the FREMA international camp 2004

(Europe – Cyprus, Asia – Lebanon, S.America – Brazil)

Instructor of the national program for sport infrastructure support (E.S.Y.A.A. Greece, Cyprus) for four consecutive years

Instructor of the coaches School China Basketball Federation National.

Previews coaches are Dell Harris and Pat Riley.

== Books ==
Dragan Raca wrote several books about basketball.

First one "Basketball" (1998) was translated on eight languages and sold in 68.000 copies. All proceeds from the book Dragan Raca donated to charity, international organization "SOS Villages", children without parents.

- Scouting (1999)
- Physical preparation of professional teams(2000)
- Basic of Basketball (2001)
- Offence technical analysis (2008)
- Defense technical analysis (2008)
- Scouting analysis (2008)
- Basketball Analysis (2013)
- Basketball Camp (2013)
- MTM Basketball Defense (2014)
- Basketball Team Development (2016)
- Basketball Player Development (2017)

Dragan Raca books are now used as school books on Sport Universities.
