= Mike King (basketball) =

American basketball player (born 1978)

Personal information
- Born: March 26, 1978 (age 48) Baltimore, Maryland
- Listed height: 6 ft 5 in (1.96 m)
- Listed weight: 205 lb (93 kg)

Career information
- High school: Lake Clifton (Baltimore, Maryland)
- College: George Washington (1997– 2001)
- NBA draft: 2001: undrafted
- Playing career: 2002–2012
- Position: Guard
- Number: 5, 6, 14

Career history
- 2002–2004: Roanoke Dazzle
- 2004–2005: Fayetteville Patriots
- 2005: Guaiqueríes de Margarita
- 2005–2006: Fayetteville Patriots
- 2006: Iraklis Thessaloniki
- 2006–2007: AEL Limassol
- 2007: Basket Kwidzyn
- 2007–2009: Olympia Larissa
- 2009: Keravnos
- 2009–2010: EnBW Ludwigsburg
- 2010–2011: Peristeri
- 2011: STB Le Havre
- 2011–2012: Ikaros Kallitheas
- 2012: ETHA Engomis

Career highlights
- Co-Guard Of The Year Cyprus Basketball Division 1 (2007); All-Import Team Cyprus Basketball Division 1 (2007); All-Import Team Greek Basket League (2008); HEBA Greek All Star Game (2008); All-Import Team Greek Basket League (2009); HEBA Greek All Star Game (2009); BBL All-Star Game (2010); HEBA Greek All Star Game (2011); Atlantic 10 All-Rookie Team (1998)

Michael Antonio King (born March 26, 1978) is an American former professional basketball player.

== College career ==
King played collegiate for The George Washington University. He attended Lake Clifton High School in Baltimore, Maryland, where he won a Maryland 4A state championship as a sophomore. He then had Lake Clifton High School ranked 11th in the nation as a senior. He was a High School All-American Honorable Mention. As a 6' 4" combo guard, King was named to the Atlantic 10 All Rookie Team in 1998. He also scored over 1,000 points at George Washington University and is 4th all time in steals. He helped the team to a number of NCAA tournaments and Atlantic 10 championships.

== Professional career ==
King was selected by the Roanoke Dazzle in the 6th round of the 2002 NBA Development League Draft.

King began his professional career with the Roanoke Dazzle of the NBDL for the 02–03 season. He then played two more year seasons with the Dazzle from 03–05, where he averaged 14.1 points per game. He played at AEL Limassol in 2006–07, where his team won the Super Cup, Regular season Champs, and League Champions, and went to the FIBA Eurocup quarterfinals. In this year he was Cyprus League Co-Guard of the year and was on the Cyprus League All Import team.

King then moved to Basket Kwidzyn (Poland) in 2007–08, where he led his team in scoring before leaving to play for Olympia Larissa in the Greek Basket League. King led Olympia Larissa from 2007 to 2009, where he was an All-Star twice. King shifted gears by going to Germany to play for EnBW Ludwigsburg in 2009–10, where he was selected to play in the BBL All Star game. He then returned to Greece to play for Peristeri (Greece), where he made the 2010–11 Greek League All Star game. King returned to Cyprus to play for ETHA Engomis, where he won the Cyprus League Championship for the last time before retiring.

He appeared multiple times in Eurocup games for many different teams.
