= AEL Limassol B.C. =

Basketball team in Cyprus

TRIA EKA AEL
- Nickname: Η Βασίλισσα (The Queen); Λέοντες (Lions)
- Leagues: Cyprus Basket League; Cyprus Basket Cup; ENBL
- Founded: 1967; 59 years ago
- Arena: Nicos Solomonides Arena
- Capacity: 2,500
- Location: Limassol, Cyprus
- Team colors: Yellow, Blue
- Main sponsor: TRIA; EKA
- President: Michael Loizides
- General manager: Stavros Elliniadis
- Head coach: Kalia Papadopoulou
- Team captain: Marios Moniatis
- Championships: 1 FIBA Regional Challenge; 13 Cypriot Championships; 10 Cypriot Cups; 8 Super Cups
- Retired numbers: 1 (15)
- Website: https://ael-bc.com
Home	Away

AEL Limassol Basketball Club (Greek: Αθλητική Ένωση Λεμεσού, romanized: Athlitiki Enosi Lemesou, lit. 'Athletic Union of Limassol'), also known as TRIA EKA AEL for sponsorship reasons and commonly referred to as AEL, is the basketball team of the AEL multi-sport club, based in Limassol, Cyprus. Nicknamed "the Queen" of Cypriot Basketball, AEL is a founding member of the Cyprus Basketball Federation and in the years since, the club has established itself as one of the most successful basketball teams in Cyprus.

Throughout its history, the club has experienced two separate periods of near-total domestic dominance, which are generally referred to as the 'two golden ages'. The first golden age refers to the period lasting from 1980 until 1989, during which, under the leadership of player–coach Giorgos Thyrotos, the club won 12 domestic trophies. The second golden age (2002–2010) is widely considered to have been the most successful period in the club's history, as the club became the only sports club from Cyprus to have won a European trophy, having won the FIBA Europe Regional Challenge Cup in 2003. During this period, the club also set multiple Cypriot basketball records for the number of National Championships and Super Cups won in a row, and for the number of consecutive home-court victories achieved in EuroChallenge matches (25 in total). Overall, the club has participated in 56 competitive finals, winning a total of 32 major trophies, consisting of 13 Basket League titles, 10 Cypriot Cups, 8 Super Cups, 1 FIBA Europe Challenge Cup.

From the 2003–04 season until the 2009–10 season, AEL managed to advance to at least the knockout phase of the FIBA EuroChallenge in each season, with the 2008 and 2009 seasons being of particular note, as the club qualified for the Final Four phase of the tournament, finishing in 3rd and 4th place respectively. During these successful campaigns, AEL secured victories over several well-established European sides such as, Fenerbahçe, Virtus Bologna, ASVEL, PAOK BC, Real Betis, Bandırma B.İ.K., BC Spartak Saint Petersburg, PBC Lokomotiv Kuban, Paris Basket Racing, PBC Ural Great, Azovmash Mariupol, G.S. Iraklis Thessaloniki, Dexia Mons-Hainaut, BC Khimik, Liege Basket and CB Estudiantes.

Certain notable players that once played for the club include Georgios Thyrotos, Duane Woodward, Milutin Aleksić, Frankie King, Giorgos Palalas, Haris Mujezinović, Remon van de Hare, Bruno Šundov, JamesOn Curry, Kenny Gabriel, Karim Souchu, LaVell Blanchard, Goran Nikolić, Michael Antonio "Mike" King, Bryan Bracey, Michael McDonald, Michalis Kounounis, Ilian Evtimov, Goran Jeretin, Vassil Evtimov, Kęstutis Šeštokas, Giannis Giannoulis and Jerai Grant.

== History ==
=== Founding, early years & First Golden Age (1966–1988) ===
The basketball department of AEL was founded in 1966 with Michalis Nikolaidis being the pioneer and coach and the club was one of the founding members of the Cyprus Basketball Federation. Nikolaidis, himself being a high school P.E. teacher, recruited various students (such as Georgios Thyrotos, Panikos Evzonas, Spyros Antoniou, Donis Kounounis, Andros Michaelides, Andreas Katsampis, etc.) which he considered suitable and formed the first basketball team of AEL, based in the open court "Oasis" located in Gladstonos Street, Limassol. Due to Nicolaides' methodical approach in his coaching style, he was able to produce a talented batch of basketball players. As a result, the first distinction for AEL came early on (in 1972), when they finished second in the Cyprus Basketball League, behind the most dominant team of that period, PAEEK Kyrenia.

In the following 1972–73 season, AEL progressed to its first Cyprus Cup final, losing to APOEL. Despite the fact that both opportunities to bring silverware to the club had failed, it was obvious that the foundations had been laid and the team was ready to take its next "great leap". The following year, in 1974, the team celebrated its first Cypriot Championship, with Dimitris Palalas, Lakis Silvestros, Giorgos Fotas and Michalis Loizidis slowly being added to the roster. In 1978 and 1980, the team completed the double, winning both the Cypriot Championship and the Cypriot Cup. The next batch of up and coming players that were to become the new stars of the team were Antonis Evzonas, Marios Thrasyvoulidis, Michalis Hadjineofytou, Stavros Stavrou, Marios Georgiou, Frikos Karagiannis, Melios Athanasiadis. With these players, AEL won three more doubles (1982, 1983, 1985) and rightfully earned the nickname "Queen" of Cyprus basketball.

From 1981 the technical leadership was taken over by captain George Thyrotos, who was both player and coach. Thyrotos became AEL's primary flag bearer for almost three decades, after having played for the club from 1967 until 1987, and, following his retirement as a player, he carried on as head coach until 1989. Throughout this period, Thyrotos managed to secure multiple major trophies for the club in each of these roles, which has led him to be often considered one of the team's greatest ever players. Indeed, AEL became the dominant team in Cyprus in the 1980s, a decade in which it won twelve major trophies in total (six national championships, four Cypriot Cups, and two Super Cups). Due to these unprecedented (as they were at the time) domestic successes, this has resulted in the time period between 1980 and 1989 being retroactively dubbed by the club itself as AEL's "First Golden Age".

First Golden Age (1980–1988)
Season	Cypriot Division A	Cypriot Basketball Cup	Cypriot Super Cup	FIBA Saporta Cup	FIBA Korać Cup
1979–80	Winners	Winners	DNQ	–––	–––
1980–81	Playoffs	Winners	DNQ	Qualifier	–––
1981–82	Winners	Winners	DNQ	–––	–––
1982–83	Winners	Winners	DNQ	Qualifier	–––
1984–85	Winners	Knockout round	Winners	Qualifier	–––
1986–87	Winners	Runners-up	DNQ	–––	Qualifier
1987–88	Winners	Knockout round	Runners-up	Qualifier	–––
1988–89	Playoffs	Knockout round	Winners	Qualifier	–––
Winners; Runners-up; Final Four or better; Last 16 or better; DNQ = Did Not Qualify

=== Decline, relegation & return to glory (1989–2001) ===
By the early 1990s however, the team began to display signs of its decline, due in part to the retirements of the team's core player group as well as from the transfers of two of the club's star players, Antonis Evzonas and Frikos Karagiannis, who had been transferred to POL and Keravnos. Another factor which greatly influenced the team's decline was that other Cypriot teams started to sign foreign players and whilst AEL also participated in this practice, a string of poor signings ultimately brought the team to its knees - inevitably leading to the club's relegation to the second division at the end of the 1991–92 season.

Following this catastrophic setback, the club appointed team veterans, Stavros Grigoriou, Dimitris Palalas and Marios Thrasyvoulides, as the three-member ruling panel in charge of the team's technical leadership. Despite the fact that the vision of the ruling panel was oftentimes restricted by various external factors, the club nevertheless returned to the top-tier of Cypriot basketball the following year undefeated and in 1994 a major reconstruction effort commenced, with a strong focus on developing a robust team infrastructure, from which the talents of the next decade emerged, such as Georgios Palalas, Michalis Kounounis, Rakis Karagiannis, Lauris Hadjivassiliou and George Nikolaou.

By the summer of 1996, George Triantaphyllides was hired at the helm of the technical leadership. The fans of AEL, disappointed by the relegation of the football team, found "refuge" in the basketball team. The passion of George Triantaphyllides for basketball in combination with the unwavering support from the basketball club played a massive role in AEL's subsequent successes. Despite the seemingly abysmal start to millennium for AEL, the club nevertheless managed to close the decade with moderate success, by reaching the 1998–99 Cypriot Basketball Cup Final, against Keravnos B.C. Even though AEL lost the game by 78–49, the team's significant overhaul during the mid-1990s was finally beginning to yield results on the court and it was becoming all the more apparent that AEL was on the cusp of another "golden era".

=== Second Golden Age & various European successes (2002–2010) ===
==== The initial Dragan Raca era (2002–2005) ====
In 2002, AEL appointed Dragan Raca as head coach, a former player of the club that had retired from playing at the end of the 2001–02 CBL season, with his managerial duties commencing from the start of the 2002–2003 season. As the season progressed, it was becoming all the more apparent that with Raca's coaching prowess, in combination with the technical abilities possessed by the club's three star players at the time, Konstantinos Perentos, Michalis Kounounis and Duane Woodward, AEL was a force to be reckoned with and a serious title contender at least on a domestic level. Against all odds, on 13 February 2003, AEL was crowned with its only European title after winning the newly established 2002–03 FIBA Europe Regional Challenge Cup (South Conference). AEL clinched the title with an astonishing record of 10 victories in 10 games. The victory signaled the beginning of the team's European successes in the years that were to follow and between 2002 and 2010, AEL enjoyed the most successful period in its history once again retaining its title as the "Queen of Cypriot Basketball". The particular tournament was only organised in this format for one season. It was thereafter merged with the FIBA Europe Champions Cup to form the FIBA Europe Cup (2003–2005). The list of winners of FIBA's Conference South include AEL, Aris B.C., PBC Academic, Tuborg Pilsener, Banvit.

Following their unexpected success in the Challenge Cup, they were awarded a berth in the FIBA Europe League and in the following season, AEL officially made their debut at the top level of FIBA Europe competitions. AEL retained the services of their previous season's top scorer in the Cup (Duane Woodward with an average 26.7 PPG) as well as the services of local up-and-coming star Konstantinos Perentos (with an average 12 PPG and 4 RPG in the previous season). AEL participated as Cypriot champions in the newly established FIBA Europe League whereby they qualified from the group phase after eliminating both Peristeri and Paris Basket Racing. However, the club was subsequently eliminated by Hapoel Tel Aviv in the Round of 16. Domestically AEL won the treble by winning the Cypriot Championship, Cypriot Basketball Cup and Cypriot Super Cup.They faced Keravnos in the championship final and despite a narrow 99–96 victory in the first game of the series, AEL were unstoppable in the second game which was held in front of a capacity crowd in Limassol as they defeated Keravnos 103–70. The third game proved to be the most significant of the series. AEL traveled to Nicosia knowing that an away win would almost certainly guarantee the second successive championship. The club once again rose to the occasion as they defeated Keravnos by 110–96. The final game of the Cyprus play-offs, as it proved to be, took place in Limassol on 16 April 2004. All 3.000 tickets for the game were sold-out several days in advance.

In 2004–05, AEL secured another double by winning both the Cypriot Division A and Super Cup. They also came close to repeating their previous achievement during the 2004–05 FIBA Europe League, but, despite being tied in victories with 4th-placed Hapoel Tel Aviv B.C., they were behind on points differential statistics and thus finished 5th (the top four teams qualify to the next round), and were eliminated from the competition in the group phase. During the 2005–06 FIBA EuroCup (when the competition changed format) AEL passed the first group round by finishing second, eliminating both PAOK BC and Kallev Tallinn. However, after reaching the tournament's round of 16, the team finished last in the group and were eliminated from that season's competition.

Despite the fact that the club was facing tougher opposition in comparison to the opposition it had faced in previous European campaigns, the effort to reach the quarter-finals was finally achieved during the 2006–07 FIBA EuroCup season. The group that AEL were drawn in the first round of the 2006–07 EuroCup season included former EuroLeague winners Virtus Bologna, French giants ASVEL Lyon-Villeurbanne and Dutch side Astronauts Amsterdam. Given the strength of the opposition, very few expected that AEL were likely candidates to qualify to the next round. However, following a surprise 88–83 victory over Virtus Bologna, followed by an upset against ASVEL where AEL won by 84–58, the club finished 2nd in their group and achieved the unimaginable by qualifying to the second round with four wins and two losses in total. Unlike the previous season, in which AEL finished with 0 points in the second round, in the 2006–07 FIBA EuroCup, AEL who were in the same group with CB Estudiantes, Liege Basket and BC Šiauliai, finished second with 5 victories and 1 defeat – tied with the Estudiantes because of the matches between them. AEL beat Estudiantes 63–62 in order to reach the quarter-finals. AEL made it all the way to the EuroCup Quarter-Finals before getting ousted by Ukrainian side Azovmash Mariupol in the three-game play-off series, the best ever performance of a Cypriot club in any European club competition at the time. Indeed, the club's dream to reach the Final Four stage of FIBA's top-tier competition, still remained elusive to them as they were eliminated from the competition by the Ukrainian team Azovmash 2–1 in victories. AEL won at home 85–79 but they were nevertheless defeated away from home by 88–63 and 97–69.

==== Organising the FIBA EuroCup All-Star Day Limassol & interest to join Greek A1 Basketball League (2006–2008) ====
AEL also played a detrimental role in FIBA's decision to host the FIBA EuroCup All-Star Day in Limassol for three consecutive seasons (2006–2008). Previous iterations of the FIBA All-Star Games were held in Kyiv and Nicosia. The tournament was played from 2004 until 2008, and during each iteration, the AEL team made various contributions to the rosters of the two competing teams, Rest of World & Europe. Namely, AEL's coach, Dragan Raca, was selected as coach of Europe's All Star team on two occasions, in 2004 and 2005. Indeed, Milutin Aleksić was selected on three separate occasions to represent the latter team (2006, 2007, 2008) whereas Michalis Kounounis was also selected once during Europe's 2005 All–Star team as was Michael McDonald, who was selected to represent the 2005 Rest of World team. Duane Woodward was selected to play on behalf of the Rest of World team on two occasions (2004, 2008), on one occasion playing against Giorgos Palalas who was selected as part of Europe's 2004 All Star team. Frankie King also was selected for the Rest of World All Star team in 2007. Finally, Ryan Randle took part in and won the 2007 FIBA EuroCup All-Star Day Slam-Dunk Contest. In addition to the above, during the 2008 off-season, AEL B.C. officials indicated that they would be interested in abandoning the Cyprus Basketball Division A to join the Greek A1 Basketball League, commencing from the 2008–09 season. However, despite AEL's interest having been warmly received by officials from the Hellenic Basketball Association, the club ultimately opted against the move.

==== Transformation from EuroChallenge contenders to EuroChallenge favourites (2008–2010) ====
It was during the two consecutive seasons that were to follow where AEL boasted perhaps its greatest European achievements. During the 2007–08 FIBA EuroChallenge season, AEL achieved a EuroChallenge season record of 8-2 (both losses occurring on the road and by a maximum margin of five points), Additionally, AEL successfully maintained an average of 81.9 PPG, with an average OPPG of 71.8, which was the highest average margin of all the Final Four teams in that season. It also marked the first time AEL lost a home game in the EuroCup since 31 January 2006. Furthermore, AEL's star player, Milutin Aleksic, lead his team in points, rebounds, assists and steals and during this season, Aleksić held that season's highest field goal percentage in a single game by connecting on all of his nine shots from the field in AEL's 103–80 win over KK Zagreb. AEL also drew more fouls than any other club in the EuroChallenge (25.3 fouls per game), and stole more balls than any other club in that season's EuroChallenge (10.3 steals per game). Following a decisive 2–0 victory against Khmik in the quarter-finals, AEL progressed to the 2008 FIBA Europe Cup Final 4, facing Dexia Mons-Hainaut in the semi-final, losing the match by 70–55. They went on to claim the 3rd place trophy, after having defeated Tartu Rock in the consolation final.

During the 2008-09 FIBA EuroChallenge season, Dragan Raca led AEL into the EuroChallenge Final Four for a second season in a row and the team was looking like it had regained its confidence following the disappointment during last season's competition. Despite AEL's European achievement that season, AEL faced a string of disappointing results in the domestic league, which eventually culminated in AEL losing 2–0 in the Cypriot league play-off semi-finals to APOEL. Due to the team's poor domestic performances, AEL decided to sack Raca and his assistant coaches Mike Protics and Thanasis Mastoris. Immediately following Raca's sacking by the club, the board of AEL appointed Serbian coach, Miroslav Nikolic, in time for the Final 4 phase of the competition, this time being held in Bologna, Italy. However, this last minute managerial change would eventually prove to be fruitless, as AEL lost in the semi-final to Virtus Bologna by 83–69. The club also lost against Triumph Lyubertsy during the consolation final by 94–82 and finished the tournament in 4th place.

Second Golden Age (2002–2010)
Season	Cypriot Division A	Cypriot Basketball Cup	Cypriot Super Cup	FIBA EuroChallenge	FIBA Challenge Cup
2002–03	Winners	Semi-finals	DNQ	–––	Winners
2003–04	Winners	Winners	Winners	Last 16	–––
2004–05	Winners	Semi-finals	Runners-up	Last 32	–––
2005–06	Winners	Runners-up	Winners	Last 16	–––
2006–07	Winners	Runners-up	Winners	Quarter-finals	–––
2007–08	Semi-finals	Winners	Winners	3rd place	–––
2008–09	Semi-finals	Winners	Winners	4th place	–––
2009–10	Runners-up	Semi-finals	Winners	Last 16	–––
Winners; Runners-up; Final Four or better; Last 16 or better; DNQ = Did Not Qualify

=== Dissolution & reformation (2011–2017) ===
Following various changes to the club's administration that occurred between 2008 and 2012, combined with the sudden departure of most of the club's key players, AEL's on-court performances struggled greatly, which left the formerly unstoppable force of Cypriot basketball looking like a shadow of its former self. In addition to these issues, during the 2012–13 season, the club was also experiencing financial difficulties and at the end of the Basket League Regular Season, AEL finished in 6th place (out of 8 teams), thereby missing out on the League playoffs. In October 2014, the club announced that the basketball section would be dissolved due to mounting financial difficulties. However, despite the club's initial decision to dissolve the basketball team, AEL Limassol nevertheless announced that it would re-establish the club for the following season with the team competing in Cyprus Basketball Division B.

The financial difficulties that the club faced still continued to burden the newly formed team and the Cyprus Basketball Federation prohibited AEL from joining the Cypriot top-flight as long as the club's debts remained unsettled and irrespective of whether they managed to achieve qualification via their final Division B position. Ironically, AEL won the Division B championship three years in a row (2015, 2016, 2017), as well as the Division B Cup twice (2015, 2016). Nevertheless, since the club's financial struggles persisted, the club had no choice but to continue competing in the Cyprus Basketball Division B, ultimately leading the club to the brink of collapse for a second time at the end of the 2016–17 season.

=== Recent history (2018–present) ===
==== Return to Division A & reaching two Cup finals (2018–2022) ====
With another dissolution appearing imminent, a consortium of around 20 local businessmen and AEL supporters took control of the basketball club and thereafter formed a limited liability company, named AEL Basketball Ltd. Benefiting from the new corporate structure, the club managed to settle a significant amount of its unpaid debts in order to return to Cypriot Basketball Division A. In September 2018, under new administration, the club returned to the Cypriot top flight following a 5-year hiatus. During the team's first season back at the top-tier of Cypriot Basketball, former club legend Giorgos Palalas, who was contemplating his retirement following the end of the 2017–18 season, instead chose to rejoin the newly formed team for the 2018–19 season after which he decided to retire from playing. Since then, the club's final league positions for the 2018–19, 2019–20, 2020–21, 2021–22 and 2022–23 seasons were 5th, 8th, 9th, 7th and 5th, respectively. During this period, the club also reached the 2022 Cypriot Cup final but they were ultimately unable to claim the trophy, losing the game to Keravnos B.C. by a scoreline of 87–55. By reaching the 2022 cup final, AEL also qualified for the 2022 Cypriot Super Cup final once again against Keravnos (who were the 2021–22 double winners), however AEL also lost this match by a scoreline of 89–74.

==== Gradual improvements & participation in the Balkan League (2023–) ====
The club currently competes in Cyprus Basketball Division A and the Cypriot Basketball Cup. Additionally, in 2023, AEL were invited to compete in the Balkan International Basketball League, a European regional basketball competition that features a closed league format, marking the club's return to European basketball competitions following a thirteen-year absence.

On 21 November 2023, AEL began their 2023–24 BIBL campaign in Limassol with a stellar performance, securing a fifty-one point margin in their victory over Montenegrin club and fellow BIBL newcomers, KK Pljevlja by 93–42. On 28 November 2023, AEL once again defeated KK Pljevlja in their return match in Montenegro by a score of 72–51, thus securing their second consecutive victory in the 2023–24 BIBL season and extending their win-streak to eight consecutive victories in all competitions. Following the strong start to their 2023–24 season, on 30 November 2023 AEL next faced Montenegrin side, KK Lovćen, in their third Delasport BIBL match of the season, once again playing away from home in Cetinje, Montenegro. Despite a strong start to the game, AEL ultimately lost to the Montenegrin side by a three-point margin (78–75). On 6 February 2024, AEL defeated KB Peja by 94–84 in their fifth match of the 2023–24 BIBL season. On 8 February, AEL lost to KB Sigal Prishtina by 86–71. On 12 March 2024, AEL secured their fifth victory in the 2023–24 BIBL season, by defeating KB Peja in Limassol. On 25 March 2024, AEL were defeated by KB Sigal Prishtina by 67–70 in their eighth and final match of the 2023–24 BIBL Regular Season. In the Final Four phase of the tournament, which took place in Limassol, AEL defeated KB Peja by 99–94 in the semifinals, before losing to KB Sigal Prishtina by 72–67 in the final of the 2023–24 Balkan League.

Recent years (2018–present)
Season	Basket League	Basket Cup	Super Cup	Balkan League	GP	W	L	Win%	Pts +	Pts –	+ / –
2018–19	5th	First round	DNQ	—	22	7	15	31.82%	1,633	1,714	–81
2019–20	8th	n/a (Note: Competition cancelled due to the Covid-19 pandemic.)	DNQ	—	16	4	12	25.00%	1,120	1,264	–144
2020–21	9th	First round	n/a (Note: Competition cancelled due to the Covid-19 pandemic.)	—	18	1	17	5.56%	1,189	1,454	–265
2021–22	7th	Runners-up	DNQ	—	26	12	14	46.15%	2,051	2,165	–114
2022–23	5th	First round	Runners-up	—	22	10	12	45.45%	1,841	1,875	–34
2023–24	5th	First round	DNQ	Runners-up	36	19	17	52.78%	2,809	2,632	+177
2024–25	3rd	First round	DNQ	—	20	14	6	70.00%	1,752	1,487	+265
Winners; Runners-up; Final Four or better; Last 16 or better; DNQ = Did Not Qualify

== Stadium ==
"This is a very hard place to play. Just look at the good teams we haven't lost to here. (Virtus) Bologna, Estudiantes, Azovmash, (Asvel) Villeurbanne - a lot came last year and lost. That means we have very big home advantage."

— Milutin Aleksić, former star player,

Initially, AEL's home ground was the "Oasis" open court located in Gladstone Street, Limassol. By the 1990s however, AEL began playing their games at their new stadium near Franklin Roosevelt Street, Limassol. This stadium however maintained a limited capacity of just 1,000 spectators and, given the sport's rapidly growing popularity in Cyprus, this ultimately meant that an expansion of the stadium was necessary and from 2002 until 2005, while these renovation works were underway, the club temporarily moved to Apollon's stadium. Since the 2004–05 season, AEL play their home games at their privately owned arena, (named the Nicos Solomonides Arena (Note: The stadium was initially called "Melford Arena" for sponsorship reasons. Subsequently, the arena was renamed the "Cooperative Bank Arena", until it finally reverted back to "Nicos Solomonides Arena")) which has a total seating capacity of 2,500 seats.

In October 2005, FIBA Europe Secretary General Nar Zanolin was present during the opening ceremony of AEL's new arena in order to officiate the opening ceremony of the stadium for competitive play for the 2005–06 season. AEL began its tenure at the Arena with a victory, beating Estonian side BC Kalev 67–49 in the EuroCup.

"It's not a pleasant event for a road team to play there, and AEL makes the most of it. One week after Virtus suffered there their only defeat so far, ASVEL arrived with a 19-point margin win from the first match, and lost 84-58. In English you spell it "O-U-C-H", in French "A-E-I", in ASVEL's case it's "A-E-L"."

— FIBA Europe press release,

At the moment, Nicos Solomonides Arena is also home to the club's offices, official club shop, an AEL themed cafe-restaurant named "Yellow Pride Cafe", a workout area and 12 VIP boxes. The arena also houses club offices for AEL's other sports departments. The arena was named after the late Nicos Solomonides, one of the founders of AEL Limassol and a former president of the club. In 2022, the club announced its intention to build a museum dedicated to the achievements of the various departments of AEL sports club, which will include among others, the club's trophy cabinet, framed photographs from historic events/games, a display collection featuring historic basketball jerseys worn by AEL B.C. as well as the jerseys worn by their European opponents during the club's second golden age.

The arena is more commonly referred to by basketball fans as "To Klouvi" (Greek: Το Κλουβί, lit. 'The Cage'), which refers to the claustrophobic atmosphere that is created when the stadium is at maximum attendance. On occasion, various critics have asserted that due to the close proximity between the players and AEL's supporters, the atmosphere in the Arena may discourage opponent teams during live play, thereby creating an unfair disadvantage for the visitor team.

== Supporters & rivalries ==
AEL B.C. is often noted for maintaining a loyal fan-base, who are well known for actively supporting their team regardless of success or failure. The organised supporters group of AEL Limassol is called SYFAEL (Greek: ΣΥ.Φ.ΑΕΛ – Σύνδεσμος Φιλάθλων ΑΕΛ, lit. 'AEL Supporters Association'), otherwise known as Thyra 3 (Greek: ΘΥΡΑ 3, lit. 'Gate 3'). Founded in 1989, they are one of the largest and most historic organised fan clubs in Cyprus. They also support other clubs within the AEL sports club, particularly the football and volleyball clubs.

"AEL is a historic and very successful team in Cyprus and a very well-known entity in Europe also with great achievements in the past and truly amazing supporters! I had the chance to witness this myself several times during my times as International FIBA referee and since then AEL and the people of Limassol have a special place in my heart."

— Shay Shtriks, BIBL Sports Director & former International FIBA referee,

SYFAEL are known for the atmosphere they create when the team plays at home at Nicos Solomonides Arena, particularly in European games. As is the case with the football department of the club, AEL B.C. share a strong rivalry with fellow Limassol basketball club, Apollon B.C. The club also shares rivalries with Nicosia clubs, APOEL B.C. and Omonia B.C. However, unlike the Cyprus Football League, AEL is the most successful basketball team in Cyprus.

"We're here to win. In any situation you meet a team as strong as AEL you have 50-50 chance to win. When you play them at home it turns to 75-25 in their favor. Their fans give them a big advantage."

— Theirry Wilquin, team manager of Dexia prior to their impending Final 4 clash against AEL,

The club's supporters also maintain a shared friendly rivalry with Keravnos B.C., the latter of whom are also one of the most successful basketball teams in Cyprus. During the 2000s, prior to the club's eventual decline, the rivalry between the supporters groups of both AEL and APOEL became particularly heated, leading to a significant rise in incidents of hooliganism during derby games. On one occasion, members of SYFAEL attacked the APOEL team bus, breaking the bus windows and injuring two APOEL staff members in the process.

SYFAEL did not attend any AEL games in the initial seasons since the club's return to the top-flight (2018—19, 2019—20, 2020–21, 2021—22) after choosing to abstain from the matches in protest of the new mandatory fan identification cards imposed by the C.S.O. – Cyprus Sports Organisation (Greek: Κ.Ο.Α. – Κυπριακή Ομοσπονδία Αθλητισμού). However, since SYFAEL's return to the arena (from the 2022–23 season onwards), the sport's domestic popularity has gradually increased, as have the incidents of fan violence. SYFAEL have also accompanied the club to various European destinations to show their support, gaining admiration from professional Basketball Organisations such as representatives from FIBA Europe, the Cyprus Basketball Federation and the Director of the Balkan International Basketball League.

== Colours & crest history ==
AEL traditionally wear yellow jerseys and yellow shorts when playing at home and navy blue jerseys and navy blue shorts when playing away. As from the 2023–24 BIBL season, AEL's home uniform consists of a black jersey with yellow/blue accents and black shorts with yellow/blue stripes.

From the basketball club's inception in 1967 up until the end of the 2004–05 season, AEL B.C. used the same logo as its parent club (as did all departments of AEL sports club). This logo consisted of an outer navy blue ring containing therein a yellow circle bearing the circularly shaped initials of the club (ΑΕΛ) in navy blue. Since 2005 however, all of the departments of AEL sports club have adopted unique logos to differentiate between each separate department. AEL B.C.'s original logo was re-worked so as it contained a stylized basketball in the center of the logo which is encircled by an additional ring containing the words "BASKETBALL" and "1967”, denoting the year the club was founded.

Additionally, a star was added above the logo commemorating the 10 championship titles AEL had won throughout its history. As of 23 September 2022, AEL's logo featured an additional second star to commemorate its 2003 FIBA Europe Challenge Cup title.

1967–2004

2004–2022

2022–present

== Mascot ==
=== Leontas ("Lion") ===
Leontas (Greek: Λέοντας, romanized: Lēontas, lit. 'Lion'") is the official mascot of AEL Limassol, who entertains fans during game breaks and participates in all entertainment events inside AEL's home court.

Leontas has been featured consistently in AEL B.C.'s European matches hosted at the Nicos Solomonides Arena since at least the late 1990s, and usually can be seen standing near the club's organised supporters, often chanting alongside them.

== Players ==
=== 2026–27 TRIA EKA AEL roster ===
As of 4 October 2026

Players

Pos.	No.	Nat.	Name	Height
G	0	(United States)	Clark, Donte	1.93 m (6 ft 4 in)
F	1	(United States)	Bailey, Brendan	2.03 m (6 ft 8 in)
G	2	(United States)	Johnson, Javonte	1.98 m (6 ft 6 in)
C	6	(Cyprus)	Foullidis, Savvas	2.00 m (6 ft 7 in)
G/F	7	(Cyprus)	Christodoulou, Antreas	1.97 m (6 ft 6 in)
G	8	(United States)	McClure, Kyran	1.88 m (6 ft 2 in)
G	11	(Cyprus)	Armakolas, Giorgos	1.85 m (6 ft 1 in)
F	16	(United States)	Glover II, Troy	2.08 m (6 ft 10 in)
SF	17	(Cyprus)	Constantinou, Alex	1.92 m (6 ft 4 in)
C	18	(Senegal)	Faye, Pape	2.00 m (6 ft 7 in)
PF	30	(Cyprus)	Georgiou, Marios	2.01 m (6 ft 7 in)
C	42	(United States)	Taylor, Travis	2.03 m (6 ft 8 in)
G	89	(United States)	Carry, Sincere	1.85 m (6 ft 1 in)
F	-	(United States)	Edmonds III, Trey	2.08 m (6 ft 10 in)

Coaches

Head Coach

Kalia Papadopoulou (CYP)

Assistant Coaches

Vassilis Tasias (CYP)

Stamatis Tsantes (GRE)

Team captain (C)

Marios Georgiou (CYP)

== Honours ==
=== Continental ===
- FIBA EuroChallenge / FIBA EuroCup (3rd–tier):

- 3rd place (1): 2007–08
- Semi-finalist (2): 2007–08, 2008–09
- Quarter-finalist (1): 2006–07
- Last 16 (3): 2003–04, 2005–06, 2009–10
- Last 32 (1): 2004–05

- FIBA Europe Regional Challenge Cup (4th–tier):

- Winners (1): 2002–03

- Balkan International Basketball League (regional):

- Runners-up (1): 2023–24

=== Domestic ===
- Cyprus Basket League:

- Winners (13) (record): 1973–74, 1977–78, 1979–80, 1981–82, 1982–83, 1983–84, 1986–87, 1987–88, 2002–03, 2003–04, 2004–05, 2005–06, 2006–07
- Runners-up (3): 2000–01, 2009–10, 2010–11

- Cyprus Basketball Cup, Division A:

- Winners (10): 1977–78, 1979–80, 1980–81, 1981–82, 1982—83, 1984–85, 2003–04, 2007–08, 2008–09, 2025–26
- Runners-up (9): 1972–73, 1976–77, 1986–87, 1998–99, 2000–01, 2005–06, 2006–07, 2010–11, 2021–22

- Cyprus Basketball Super Cup:

- Winners (8): 1985, 1988, 2003, 2005, 2006, 2007, 2008, 2009
- Runners-up (6): 1987, 2004, 2011, 2022, 2026

- Cyprus Basketball Division B:

- Winners (4): 1992–93, 2015–16, 2016–17, 2017–18

- Cyprus Basketball Cup, Division B:

- Winners (2): 2015–16, 2016–17

== AEL B.C. statistics in Continental / Regional tournaments ==
Participation in Continental / Regional Tournaments
Season	Organisation	Tier	Competition	Pos.	GP	W	L	Win%
2023–24	Delasport BIBL	n/a (Note: Regional tournament sanctioned by FIBA Europe)	Balkan League	F	10	6	4	60.00%
2009–10	FIBA Europe	3	EuroChallenge	L16	12	4	8	33.33%
2008–09	FIBA Europe	3	EuroChallenge	4th	20	14 (Note: Out of the twenty European games that AEL played during the EuroChallenge season, one result included a draw against BC Donetsk in the first qualifying round.)	5	70.00%
2007–08	FIBA Europe	3	EuroCup	3rd	12	9	3	75.00%
2006–07	FIBA Europe	3	EuroCup	QF	15	10	5	66.67%
2005–06	FIBA Europe	3	EuroCup	L16	12	5	7	41.67%
2004–05	FIBA Europe	2 / 3	Europe League	L32	14	8	6	57.14%
2003–04	FIBA Europe	2 / 3	Europe League	L16	14	7	7	50.00%
2002–03	FIBA Europe	4	Challenge Cup	W	10	10	0	100%
2001–02	FIBA Europe	3	Korac Cup	2R	8	2	6	25.00%
2000–01	FIBA Europe	3	Korac Cup	PR	2	0	2	0.00%
1999–00	FIBA Europe	3	Korac Cup	1R	2	0	2	0.00%
1998–99	FIBA Europe	3	Korac Cup	PR	2	0	2	0.00%
1997–98	FIBA Europe	3	Korac Cup	PR	6	1	5	16.67%
1991–92	FIBA Europe	3	Korac Cup	PR	2	0	2	0.00%
1988–89	FIBA Europe	2	Saporta Cup	PR	2	0	2	0.00%
1987–88	FIBA Europe	2	Saporta Cup	PR	2	0	2	0.00%
1986–87	FIBA Europe	3	Korac Cup	PR	2	0	2	0.00%
1983–84	FIBA Europe	2	Saporta Cup	PR	2	0	2	0.00%
1982–83	FIBA Europe	2	Saporta Cup	PR	2	0	2	0.00%
1980–81	FIBA Europe	2	Saporta Cup	PR	2	0	2	0.00%
1978–79	FIBA Europe	2	Saporta Cup	PR	6	0	6	0.00%
Grand Total					159 (Note: Out of the twenty European games that AEL played during the EuroChallenge season, one result included a draw against BC Donetsk in the first qualifying round.)	76	82	47.80%

Winners Finalist Final Four

L16 = Last 16;

1R = 1st Round;

2R = 2nd Round;

L32 = Last 32;

PR = Preliminary Round;

QF = Quarter Finals;

RS = Regular Season;

W = Winners.

== Participation in Continental Final Fours ==
2002–03 FIBA Regional Challenge
(Tier 4)

Semi-finals
12 February 2003
(Cyprus) Apollon	52
(Cyprus) AEL	73
12 February 2003
(Bosnia and Herzegovina) Igokea	79
(Romania) Progresul	64

Final
13 February 2003
(Cyprus) AEL	92
(Bosnia and Herzegovina) Igokea	82
Third place
13 February 2003
(Cyprus) Apollon	79
(Romania) Progresul	65

2007–08 FIBA EuroCup
(Tier 3)

Semi-finals
18 April 2008
(Estonia) Tartu	82
(Latvia) Barons	88
18 April 2008
(Belgium) Dexia	70
(Cyprus) AEL	55

Final
20 April 2008
(Latvia) Barons	63
(Belgium) Dexia	62
Third place
20 April 2008
(Cyprus) AEL	79
(Estonia) Tartu	70

2008–09 FIBA EuroChallenge
(Tier 3)

Semi-finals
24 April 2009
(France) Cholet	81
(Russia) Triumph	78
24 April 2009
(Italy) Virtus	83
(Cyprus) AEL	69

Final
26 April 2009
(Italy) Virtus	77
(France) Cholet	75
Third place
26 April 2009
(Russia) Triumph	94
(Cyprus) AEL	82

2023–24 Balkan League
(Regional)

Semi-finals
12 April 2024
(Kosovo) KB Prishtina	89
(Montenegro) KK Lovcen	69
12 April 2024
(Cyprus) AEL	99
(Kosovo) KB Peja	94

Final
14 April 2024
(Kosovo) KB Prishtina	72
(Cyprus) AEL	67
Third place
14 April 2024
(Kosovo) KB Peja	93
(Montenegro) KK Lovcen	82

== List of victories in Continental / Regional campaigns ==
See table below to view AEL's performances in their continental / regional campaigns:

Season	Competition	Date	Opponent	Location	Score	Attendance
1997–98	FIBA Korac Cup 1998, Preliminary Round	19 November 1997	Hapoel Galil Elyon	Limassol (CYP)	88–83	500
2001–02	FIBA Korac Cup 2002, Elimination Round II	17 October 2001	Roseto Basket	Limassol (CYP)	20–0	—
2001–02	FIBA Korac Cup 2002, Elimination Round II	24 October 2001	Roseto Basket	Roseto Degli Abruzzi (ITA)	20–0	—
2002–03	FIBA Europe Regional Challenge Cup, Group C	29 October 2002	Nikol Fert	Limassol (CYP)	84–75	350
2002–03	FIBA Europe Regional Challenge Cup, Group C	6 November 2002	HKK Brotnjo	Citluk (BIH)	75–74	500
2002–03	FIBA Europe Regional Challenge Cup, Group C	13 November 2002	BC Zrinjevac	Limassol (CYP)	82–70	800
2002–03	FIBA Europe Regional Challenge Cup, Group C	4 December 2002	Nikol Fert	Gostivar (FYROM)	87–67	300
2002–03	FIBA Europe Regional Challenge Cup, Group C	11 December 2002	HKK Brotnjo	Limassol (CYP)	94–83	1500
2002–03	FIBA Europe Regional Challenge Cup, Group C	18 December 2002	BC Zrinjevac	Zagreb (CRO)	77–72	900
2002–03	FIBA Europe Regional Challenge Cup, Quarter-Finals	7 January 2003	HKK Brotnjo	Limassol (CYP)	97–74	1500
2002–03	FIBA Europe Regional Challenge Cup, Quarter-Finals	9 January 2003	HKK Brotnjo	Limassol (CYP)	95–78	1500
2002–03	FIBA Europe Regional Challenge Cup, Semi-Finals	12 January 2003	Pizza Express Apollon	Limassol (CYP)	73–52	2000
2002–03	FIBA Europe Regional Challenge Cup, Final	13 January 2003	KK Igokea	Limassol (CYP)	92–82	3500
2003–04	FIBA Europe League, Qualifying Round	18 November 2003	KK Hemofarm	Vrsac (SCG)	75–68	1500
2003–04	FIBA Europe League, Qualifying Round	25 November 2003	Dexia Mons-Hainaut	Limassol (CYP)	69–68	1200
2003–04	FIBA Europe League, Qualifying Round	2 December 2003	BC Khimki	Limassol (CYP)	87–68	2000
2003–04	FIBA Europe League, Qualifying Round	16 December 2003	Paris Basket Racing	Limassol (CYP)	72–67	2000
2003–04	FIBA Europe League, Qualifying Round	13 January 2004	ANWIL Wloclawek	Wloclawek (POL)	68–54	3000
2003–04	FIBA Europe League, Qualifying Round	20 January 2004	GS Peristeri	Limassol (CYP)	63–57	2500
2003–04	FIBA Europe League, Qualifying Round	3 February 2004	Dexia Mons-Hainaut	Mons (BEL)	81–76	1700
2004–05	FIBA Europe League, Group D	2 November 2004	Lavovi 063	Limassol (CYP)	81–79	1000
2004–05	FIBA Europe League, Group D	30 November 2004	Iraklis Thessalonikis	Limassol (CYP)	88–77	1200
2004–05	FIBA Europe League, Group D	7 December 2004	Olympia Larissas	Limassol (CYP)	89–80	1200
2004–05	FIBA Europe League, Group D	23 December 2004	Lavovi 063	Belgrade (SRB)	20–0	–
2004–05	FIBA Europe League, Group D	12 January 2005	Khimik Yuzhny	Limassol (CYP)	83–64	1800
2004–05	FIBA Europe League, Group D	18 January 2005	Paris Basket Racing	Limassol (CYP)	64–58	1800
2004–05	FIBA Europe League, Group D	1 February 2005	Iraklis Thessaloniki	Thessaloniki (GRE)	89–87	500
2004–05	FIBA Europe League, Group D	8 February 2005	Olympia Larissas	Larissa (GRE)	73–69	100
2005–06	FIBA EuroCup, Round 1	26 October 2005	BC Kalev	Limassol (CYP)	67–49	1500
2005–06	FIBA EuroCup, Round 1	2 November 2005	PAOK B.C.	Thessaloniki (GRE)	75–74	500
2005–06	FIBA EuroCup, Round 1	9 November 2005	Fenerbahçe S.K	Limassol (CYP)	82–81	3000
2005–06	FIBA EuroCup, Round 1	15 November 2005	BC Kalev	Tallinn (EST)	71–65	1500
2005–06	FIBA EuroCup, Round 1	23 November 2005	PAOK B.C.	Limassol (CYP)	84–67	1500
2006–07	FIBA EuroCup, Round 1	14 November 2006	Amsterdam Astronauts	Limassol (CYP)	82–49	1200
2006–07	FIBA EuroCup, Round 1	21 November 2006	Virtus Europonteggi Bologna	Limassol (CYP)	88–83	3100
2006–07	FIBA EuroCup, Round 1	29 November 2006	Adecco ASVEL Villeurbanne	Limassol (CYP)	84–58	3500
2006–07	FIBA EuroCup, Round 1	4 December 2006	Amsterdam Astronauts	Amsterdam (NED)	95–79	350
2006–07	FIBA EuroCup, Round 2	16 January 2007	Liege Basket	Limassol (CYP)	70–64	2500
2006–07	FIBA EuroCup, Round 2	23 January 2007	BC Siauliai	Siauliai (LTU)	85–79	850
2006–07	FIBA EuroCup, Round 2	30 January 2007	Club Estudiantes	Limassol (CYP)	63–62	3500
2006–07	FIBA EuroCup, Round 2	13 February 2007	Liege Basket	Liege (BEL)	77–58	1000
2006–07	FIBA EuroCup, Round 2	20 February 2007	BC Siauliai	Limassol (CYP)	94–85	2100
2006–07	FIBA EuroCup, Quarter Final	9 March 2007	Azovmash Mariupol	Limassol (CYP)	85–79	3450
2007–08	FIBA EuroCup, Round 2	20 November 2007	BC Dnipro	Dnipropetrovsk (UKR)	64–53	5000
2007–08	FIBA EuroCup, Round 2	27 November 2007	BC Dnipro	Limassol (CYP)	104-69	600
2007–08	FIBA EuroCup, Round 2	19 December 2007	KK Zagreb	Limassol (CYP)	103-80	1100
2007–08	FIBA EuroCup, Round 2	15 January 2008	Olympia Larissas	Limassol (CYP)	91–71	800
2007–08	FIBA EuroCup, Round 2	22 January 2008	Spartak St. Petersburg	St. Petersburg (RUS)	81–77	800
2007–08	FIBA EuroCup, Round 2	29 January 2008	Spartak St. Petersburg	Limassol (CYP)	72–71	2500
2007–08	FIBA EuroCup, Round 2	19 February 2008	BC Khimik	Limassol (CYP)	70–65	2000
2007–08	FIBA EuroChallenge, Quarter Final	26 February 2008	BC Khimik	Yuzhny (UKR)	87–76	1700
2007–08	FIBA EuroChallenge, Consolation Final	20 April 2008	Tartu Rock	Limassol (CYP)	79–70	2000
2008–09	FIBA EuroChallenge, Qualifying Round 1	22 October 2008	BC Donetsk	Limassol (CYP)	79–55	1200
2008–09	FIBA EuroChallenge, Qualifying Round 2	4 November 2008	Banvit BC	Bandirma (TUR)	100-93	650
2008–09	FIBA EuroChallenge, Qualifying Round 2	11 November 2008	Banvit BC	Limassol (CYP)	89–72	2000
2008–09	FIBA EuroChallenge, Group D	25 November 2008	BC Siauliai	Limassol (CYP)	102–76	1000
2008–09	FIBA EuroChallenge, Group D	9 December 2008	Allianz Swans	Limassol (CYP)	86–62	1000
2008–09	FIBA EuroChallenge, Group D	6 January 2009	Eiffel Towers	Limassol (CYP)	95–77	1200
2008–09	FIBA EuroChallenge, Group D	13 January 2009	Allianz Swans	Gmunden (AUT)	85–77	1000
2008–09	FIBA EuroChallenge, Last 16	27 January 2009	Cajasol	Sevilla (ESP)	64–56	1400
2008–09	FIBA EuroChallenge, Last 16	3 February 2009	Ural Great	Limassol (CYP)	102–75	1200
2008–09	FIBA EuroChallenge, Last 16	10 February 2009	Lokomotiv Rostov	Rostov-on-Don (RUS)	87–69	2000
2008–09	FIBA EuroChallenge, Last 16	24 February 2009	Cajasol	Limassol (CYP)	88–78	800
2008–09	FIBA EuroChallenge, Last 16	10 March 2009	Lokomotiv Rostov	Limassol (CYP)	74–60	500
2008–09	FIBA EuroChallenge, Quarter-final	17 March 2009	EclipseJet MyGuide Amsterdam	Limassol (CYP)	82–72	2000
2008–09	FIBA EuroChallenge, Quarter-final	19 March 2009	EclipseJet MyGuide Amsterdam	Amsterdam (NED)	83–72	2000
2009–10	FIBA EuroChallenge, Group D	24 November 2009	Cedevita Zagreb	Limassol (CYP)	81–73	500
2009–10	FIBA EuroChallenge, Group D	8 December 2009	Elan Chalon	Limassol (CYP)	72–69	500
2009–10	FIBA EuroChallenge, Group D	5 January 2010	Dexia Mons-Hainaut	Limassol (CYP)	86–68	500
2009–10	FIBA EuroChallenge, Group D	2 February 2010	EiffelTowers Den Bosch	Limassol (CYP)	87–85	500
2023–24	Balkan International Basketball League, Regular Season	21 November 2023	KK Pljevlja	Limassol (CYP)	93–42	2000
2023–24	Balkan International Basketball League, Regular Season	28 November 2023	KK Pljevlja	Pljevlja (MNE)	72–51	500
2023–24	Balkan International Basketball League, Regular Season	18 December 2023	KK Lovćen 1947	Limassol (CYP)	78–61	2000
2023–24	Balkan International Basketball League, Regular Season	6 February 2024	KB Peja	Peja (KOS)	94–84	1500
2023–24	Balkan International Basketball League, Regular Season	12 March 2024	KB Peja	Limassol (CYP)	85–80	1500
2023–24	Balkan International Basketball League, Final Four	12 April 2024	KB Peja	Limassol (CYP)	99–94	2500

== Team records & milestones ==
See table below for a list of AEL B.C.'s Cypriot basketball records and team milestones:

Date	Milestone
1966:	The Cyprus Basketball Federation is formed with AEL being one of the Federation's founding members.
1974:	AEL wins its first national championship.
1977:	AEL becomes the first Cypriot basketball club to participate in a European competition.
1983:	AEL defeats Ethnikos Achnas 177–39, setting dual Cypriot league records for most points scored in a single game and for obtaining the highest point differential in a single game; As of 1st September 2023, this record still stands.
1983:	AEL sets a Cypriot record for number of Cypriot Basketball Cups won in a row – four (1980, 1981, 1982 and 1983)
13/02/2003:	AEL writes a golden page in the history of Cypriot sport and athletics after it conquers the 2002–03 FIBA Europe Regional Challenge Cup, South Conference, undefeated.
28/04/2007:	AEL becomes the only team in Cyprus to win five consecutive championships in a row (2003, 2004, 2005, 2006, 2007).
18/04/2008:	AEL becomes the first Cypriot Basketball team to participate in the final four of a major European competition, doing so in the 2007–08 FIBA EuroChallenge in Limassol, eventually finishing third.
25/04/2009:	AEL becomes the only Cypriot Basketball team to participate in FIBA European final four stages in two consecutive seasons, doing so in the 2008–09 FIBA EuroChallenge in Bologna eventually finishing fourth.
17/10/2009:	AEL becomes the record holder in the number of Super Cups won in a row – five (2005, 2006, 2007, 2008, 2009)
02/02/2010:	AEL holds the record for the longest undefeated streak in European competition at Nicos Solomonides Arena with AEL reaching 25 wins on the trot (14/11/2006–02/02/2010).
01/07/2022:	AEL announces that it will officially retire the #15 jersey in tribute of club legend, George Thyrotos for his service to the club.
23/10/2022:	During a league game against Anorthosis Famagusta, which AEL won by 103–70, the team scored a total of 21 three-pointers and, as such, they were merely a single three-pointer away from matching the European basketball record for the most team three-pointers scored in a single game, which is currently held by Anadolu Efes S.K. with 22 three-pointers scored. This achievement has also set another Cypriot record for the club.
19/03/2023:	AEL appoints Kalia Papadopoulou, former star player for AEL B.C. Women, as head coach of the men's first team and thus, AEL becomes the first professional basketball club in Europe to be managed by a female head coach.
21/11/2023:	(1) During their first match of the 2023–24 BIBL season against KK Plevlja, AEL won the game by a 51-point margin (93–42), which marks this victory as AEL's highest point-margin victory in continental competitions.
21/11/2023:	(2) Additionally, AEL's match against KK Plevlja also marks the first occasion in the history of European professional basketball where a female head coach (Kalia Papadopoulou) led one of the teams in a continental men's professional basketball tournament.

== Head coaches ==
Period	Name	Nationality
1967–1979	Michalakis Nikolaides	(Cyprus) CYP
1980–1989	Georgios Thyrotos	(Cyprus) CYP
1989–1995	Stavros Grigoriou	(Cyprus) CYP
1995–1999	George Triantaphyllides	(Cyprus) CYP
1999–2002	Vassilis Fragkias	(Greece) GRE
2002–2005	Dragan Raca	(Serbia) SRB
2005–2007	Igors Miglinieks	(Latvia) LAT
2007–2008	Charles Barton	(United States) USA
2008–2009	Dragan Raca (2)	(Serbia) SRB
2009–2010	Miroslav Nikolic	(Serbia) SRB
2010–2012	Linos Gavriel	(Cyprus) CYP
2012–2017	Markos Asonitis	(Cyprus) CYP
2018–2019	Michael Koch	(West Germany) GER
2019–2020	Dimitris Sarikas	(Greece) GRE
2020–2021	Milan Nisic	(Romania) ROM
2021–2023	Markos Asonitis (2)	(Cyprus) CYP
2023–	Kalia Papadopoulou	(Cyprus) CYP

== Notable former players ==
- (Algeria) Ali Bouziane
- (Bosnia and Herzegovina) Aleksandar Radojević
- (United States) JamesOn Curry
- (Bosnia and Herzegovina) Haris Mujezinović
- (Bulgaria) Ilian Evtimov
- (Bulgaria) Vassil Evtimov
- (Greece) Giannis Giannoulis
- (Russia) Aleksandr Dedushkin
- (United States) Frankie King
- (United States) Michael Antonio "Mike" King
- (United States) Michael McDonald
- (United States) Bryan Bracey
- (United States) LaVell Blanchard
- (United States) Jeron Roberts
- (United States) Jude Alezander
- (Serbia) Milan Dozet
- (Serbia) Goran Nikolić
- (France) Karim Souchu
- (Serbia) Goran Jeretin
- (Serbia) Milutin Aleksić
- (Netherlands) Remon van de Hare
- (Cyprus) Giorgos Palalas
- (Cyprus) Michalis Kounounis
- (Cyprus) Konstantinos Perentos
- (Cyprus) Georgios Thyrotos
- (France) Maxime Zianveni
- (Lithuania) Zydrunas Urbonas
- (Lithuania) Kęstutis Šeštokas
- (United States) Darrel Mitchell
- (United States) Duane Woodward
- (United States) Bruno Šundov
- (United States) Kenny Gabriel

== Uniform manufacturers & club sponsors ==
Season	Kit Suppliers	Named Sponsors	Main Sponsors	Secondary Sponsors
2002–2003	Adidas	EKA AEL	Frantzis Motors	–––
2003–2004	Reebok	EKA AEL	CYFAST	–––
2004–2005	Champion	DTL EKA AEL	CYFAST	Christis Dairy
2004–2005	Champion	PRIVATBANK EKA AEL	CYFAST	Christis Dairy
2005–2007	Peak	DTL EKA AEL	SPE M. Geitonias	Christis Dairy
2007–2009	Peak	PROTEAS EKA AEL	Melford	Christis Dairy, Love Cyprus
2009–2010	Caan	PROTEAS EKA AEL	Cytavision, Melford	Pokka Coffee
2010–2011	Mass	PROTEAS DAΝOI AEL	Cytavision, Melford	Pokka Coffee
2011–2014	Caan	METAQUOTES AEL	Cytavision	–––
2015–2017	Royal	PALLARIS DEVS. AEL	Cytavision	–––
2017–2018	Givova	–––		
2018–2019	Athlos	EKA AEL	MegaBetPlus, CRI Group	Pizza Plus, Pilacouris Ltd
2019—2021	Crossover	EKA AEL	MegaBetPlus, CRI Group	Pizza Plus, Pilacouris Ltd
2021–2022	Caan	EKA AEL	Breinrock, CRI Group	Pizza Plus, Pilacouris Ltd, Smart Assets
2022—2023	Caan	PAYABL EKA AEL	Smart Assets, CRI Group	Pilacouris Ltd, Breinrock
2023–	Vaat	PAYABL EKA AEL	Smart Assets, FlexCar, Copybet, G. Mouskis Group	Pilacouris Ltd, Kokomix, Office Steps

== See also ==
- AEL Limassol
- AEL Limassol B.C. Women
- FIBA EuroCup All-Star Day
- FIBA EuroChallenge
- Basketball in Europe
- Cyprus Basketball All-Star Day
- Limassol derby
