= Apollon Limassol B.C. =

Apollon Limassol
- Leagues: Cyprus Division A
- Founded: 1967; 59 years ago
- History: 1967–present
- Arena: Apollon Arena
- Capacity: 1,700
- Location: Limassol, Cyprus
- Team colors: Blue and white
- President: Antigonos Theodorou
- Head coach: Demetrios Koukouris
- Team captain: Stefanos Iliadis
- Championships: Cypriot Cup (2): 2002, 2014; Cypriot Super Cup (1): 2005
Home	Away

Apollon Limassol Basketball Club (Greek: Καλαθοσφαιρικός Όμιλος Απόλλων Λεμεσού), is a Cypriot basketball club. The team competes in the Cyprus Basketball Division A, the top tier of Cypriot basketball.

Having been one of the founding members of the Cyprus Basketball Division A, Apollon Limassol have been a regular in the first division for many years. Despite this, the team has yet to see significant success both domestically and internationally.

== History ==
The Apollon Limassol sports club was founded in 1954, while the basketball section of Apollon Limassol was formed in 1967. The team was one of the founding members of the Cyprus Basketball Federation.

Since the team's inception in 1967, Apollon Limassol has regularly participated in the Cyprus Basketball Division A, the first tier of Cypriot Basketball. The titles in the history of the basketball department are the Cypriot Basketball Cups in 2002 and 2014, and a Super Cup in 2004-05.

Despite participating in the first tier for many years, Apollon Limassol have yet to achieve greater success in the league.

Apollon Limassol have briefly participated in international competitions such as the now-defunct FIBA Korać Cup and the FIBA EuroChallenge.

== Season by season ==
Season	Tier	Division	Pos.	Cypriot Cup	European competitions	
1991–92	1	Division A	4th			
1993–94	1	Division A	5th			
1997–98	1	Division A	8th			
1998–99	1	Division A	2nd			
1999–00	1	Division A	2nd		3 Korać Cup	3R
2000–01	1	Division A	2nd		3 Korać Cup	2R
2001–02	1	Division A	3rd	Champion	3 Korać Cup	1R
2002–03	1	Division A	3rd		4 EuroCup Challenge	SF
2003–04	1	Division A	4th	Runner-up		
2004–05	1	Division A	4th			
2005–06	1	Division A	4th		4 EuroCup Challenge	R16
2006–07	1	Division A	5th		4 EuroCup Challenge	SF
2007–08	1	Division A	7th			
2008–09	1	Division A	3rd			
2009–10	1	Division A	5th			
2010–11	1	Division A	5th			
2011–12	1	Division A	3rd			
2012–13	1	Division A	5th		3 EuroChallenge	RS
2013–14	1	Division A	3rd	Champion		
2014–15	1	Division A	5th			
2015–16	1	Division A	4th			
2016–17	1	Division A	6th			
2017-18	1	Division A	6th			
2018-19	1	Division A	4th			
2019-20	1	Division A	3rd			
2020-21	1	Division A	3rd			
2021-22	1	Division A	6th			
2022-23	1	Division A	4th			
2023-24	1	Division A	6th			
2024-25	1	Division A	7th			

== Honours ==
Total titles: 3

=== Domestic competitions ===
- Cypriot Championship

Runners-up: 1999, 2000, 2001

- Cypriot Cup

Winners: 2002, 2014
Runners-up: 2004

- Cypriot Super Cup

Winners: 2005
Runners-up: 2002, 2014

=== European competitions ===
- FIBA EuroCup Challenge:

Semifinalist (2): 2002–03, 2006–07

==== European cups ====
- 1999–00: Korać Cup
- 2000–01: Korać Cup: lost to (Federal Republic of Yugoslavia) Hemofarm Vršac in eliminations
- 2001–02: Korać Cup
- 2002–03: FIBA Regional Challenge Final 4: lost to eventual Challenge Cup winners (Cyprus) AEL Limassol by 73–52.
- 2003–04: FIBA Europe Cup: took 2nd place (2-2) in Group D of South Conference
- 2004–05: FIBA Europe Cup: took 3rd place (1-3) in Conference South Group C
- 2005–06: EuroCup Challenge: took 1st place (3-1) in Group G, lost to (Ukraine) Khimik in 1/8 Finals
- 2006–07: Europe Cup Challenge: took 1st place (4-2) in Group A, lost to (Russia) Samara 77–75, 50–76 in the Semifinals
- 2012–13: EuroChallenge: took 4th place (1–5) in Group G

== Current roster ==
Note: Flags indicate national team eligibility at FIBA-sanctioned events. Players may hold other non-FIBA nationalities not displayed.

Apollon Limassol roster
Players
Coaches

Pos.	No.	Nat.	Name	Ht.	Age
C	0	(Netherlands)	Plet, Ismael	2.03 m (6 ft 8 in)
G	1	(United States)	Jones, Tyrell	1.88 m (6 ft 2 in)
F	5	(United States)	Adams, Isaiah	1.98 m (6 ft 6 in)
PG	6	(Cyprus)	Iliadis, Stefanos	1.85 m (6 ft 1 in)
PF	7	(Cyprus)	Livanos, Demetris	2.04 m (6 ft 8 in)
F	9	(Cyprus)	Karampatakis, Christos	1.98 m (6 ft 6 in)
G	10	(United States)	Powell, Gyasi	1.88 m (6 ft 2 in)
PG	11	(Cyprus)	Hoseini, Askan	1.72 m (5 ft 8 in)
G	13	(Cyprus)	Papadimitriou, Nicolaos	1.88 m (6 ft 2 in)
G	16	(Cyprus)	Antoniades, Panagiotis	1.88 m (6 ft 2 in)
G	33	(Cyprus)	Louca, Ioannis	1.86 m (6 ft 1 in)
F	74	(Cyprus)	Ieronymides, Viktor	2.00 m (6 ft 7 in)

Head coach

- (Cyprus) Demetrios Koukouris

Assistant coach(es)

- (Cyprus) Stergios Xystouris

Legend

- (C) Team captain
- Injured

- Roster
Updated: 11 february 2026

== Notable players ==
- (United States) Sam Jones
- (United States) Kenny Satterfield
- (United States) Joey Dorsey
- (United States) Roy Tarpley
- (United States) Mike Jones
- (United States) Priest Lauderdale
- (Cyprus) Akis Konstantinou
- (Cyprus) Demetrios Grivas
- (Cyprus) Gregoris Pantouris
- (Cyprus) Socratis Lamaris
- (Greece) Joe Petrakis

== Notable managers ==
- (Argentina) Guillermo Vecchio
