= Enosis Neon Paralimni B.C. =

Cypriot basketball team

Enosis Neon Paralimni
- Leagues: Cypriot Championship
- Founded: 1936; 90 years ago
- Arena: Avgorou Technical School
- Location: Paralimni, Cyprus
- Website: enpfc.com
Home	Away

Enosis Neon Paralimni B.C. (in Greek: Ένωσις Νέων Παραλιμνίου) is a Cypriot professional basketball club based in Paralimni, Cyprus. The club competes in the Cypriot League, the top tier of men's professional basketball competition in the Cypriot basketball league system.

== History ==
The club was founded in 1936.

== Players ==
=== Current roster ===
E.N. Paralimni Roster
Players
Coaches

Pos.	Νο.	Nat.	Name	Ht.
SG	2	(Cyprus)	Zantis, Panagiotis	1.92 m (6 ft 4 in)
G	3	(United States)	McKissic, Brandon	1.90 m (6 ft 3 in)
PG	5	(Cyprus)	Georgiou, Marios	1.85 m (6 ft 1 in)
SG	6	(Cyprus)	Charalampous, Vasilis	1.90 m (6 ft 3 in)
G	10	(United States)	Cook Jr., Aaron	1.88 m (6 ft 2 in)
SG	13	(Cyprus)	Solomou, Simos	1.95 m (6 ft 5 in)
F	31	(United States)	Ugochukwu, Stephen	2.01 m (6 ft 7 in)
F	35	(South Sudan)	Alok, Yuat	2.08 m (6 ft 10 in)
SF	41	(Cyprus)	Pirillis, Christos	1.97 m (6 ft 6 in)
SG	77	(Cyprus)	Konstantinou, Marios	1.91 m (6 ft 3 in)

Head coach

Legend

- (C) Team captain

== Notable players ==
- Anthony Hickey (born 1992), basketball player for Hapoel Haifa in the Israeli Basketball Premier League
- Michale Kyser (born 1991), basketball player for Hapoel Holon in the Israeli Basketball Premier League

== Sources ==
- Official website
