= Engomi =

Engomi: Έγκωμη (Greek); Engomi/İncirli (Turkish)
- Municipality
- Interactive map of Engomi
- Location within Cyprus Location within the Eastern Mediterranean Location within the European Union Location within Asia
- Coordinates: 35°9′47″N 33°18′59″E
- Country: Cyprus
- District: Nicosia District
- Urban area: Nicosia

Area
  - Municipality: 9.49 km^{2} (3.66 sq mi)

Population (2011)
  - Municipality: 18,010
  - Density: 1,900/km^{2} (4,920/sq mi)
- Time zone: UTC+2 (EET)
  - Summer (DST): UTC+3 (EEST)

Engomi (Greek: Έγκωμη Turkish: Engomi or İncirli) is a suburb and municipality of the Cypriot capital Nicosia. In 2011, it had a population of 18,010. Of these, 14,254 were Cypriot citizens.

It is a mainly residential neighbourhood with many large villas. It also includes a very important annexe to the powerful Monastery of Our Lady Eleousa. The University of Nicosia is also located within the municipality and thus is home to a large student population.

Engomi has a large diplomatic presence. The embassies of Egypt, France, the United States and Russia are located in the neighborhood.

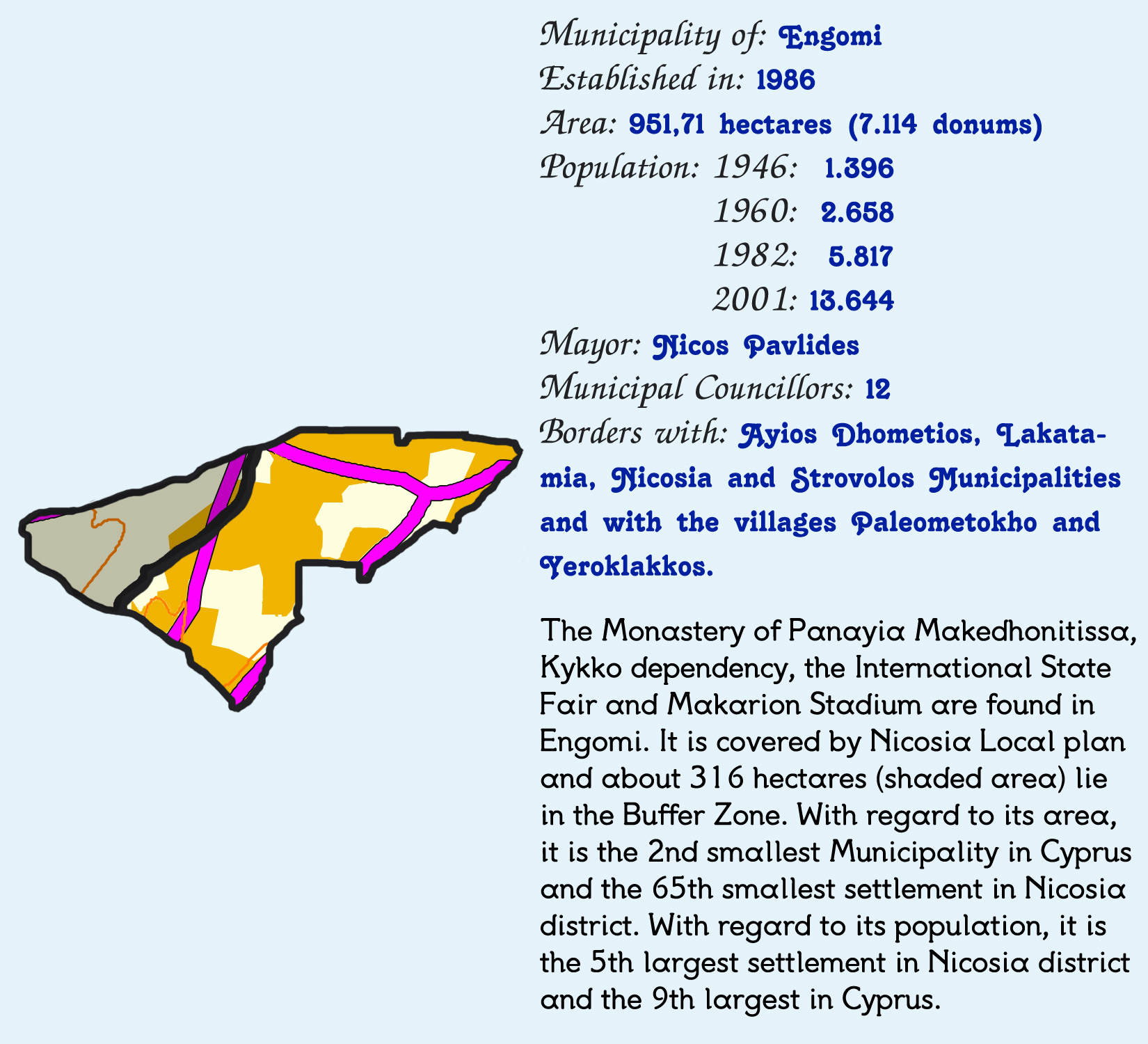
Concise presentation of Engomi

== History ==
Engomi most likely originated in 1567 after the demolition of houses and roughly 80 churches and monasteries outside the walls of Nicosia, when the Venetians built the new walls around Nicosia, which stand to this day. When the old Lusignan walls were demolished and the new walls erected, the perimeter was reduced from 4 miles (6.4 km) to 3 miles (4.8 km) in order to strengthen their defensive capability and limit the number of soldiers that were required for their manning. The homeless residents of the demolished settlements were moved to south-west of Nicosia to a distance of 1.5 miles (2.4 km) from the new wall of city and 0.5 miles (0.80 km) from the existing village of St. Dometios. Joining with farmers of the local area, they founded Engomi. The initial core of settlement constituted the area north-east of the old church of St Nicholas (near Makarios square).

The old church of St. Nicholas was inaugurated in 1898

During the period of Ottoman domination Engomi constituted a small rural community with main occupations of residents being arable agriculture and livestock-farming. And for these two occupations the suburb was endowed with very suitable conditions thanks to the fertile ground, particularly around Metochi, and abundant wild vegetation in elevated area around Makedonitissa and the present day site of Nicosia Airport. Until the first decades of the 20th century the residents of the village continued to be engaged mainly with agriculture.

By the time of the Second World War certain manufacturers were established. With the increase of population of the village and the widespread use of the bicycle, many residents of Engomi began to work in Nicosia.

After independence (1960) and particularly after 1980 Engomi developed very quickly and became one of the most modern and more developed municipalities of greater Nicosia.

== Municipality ==
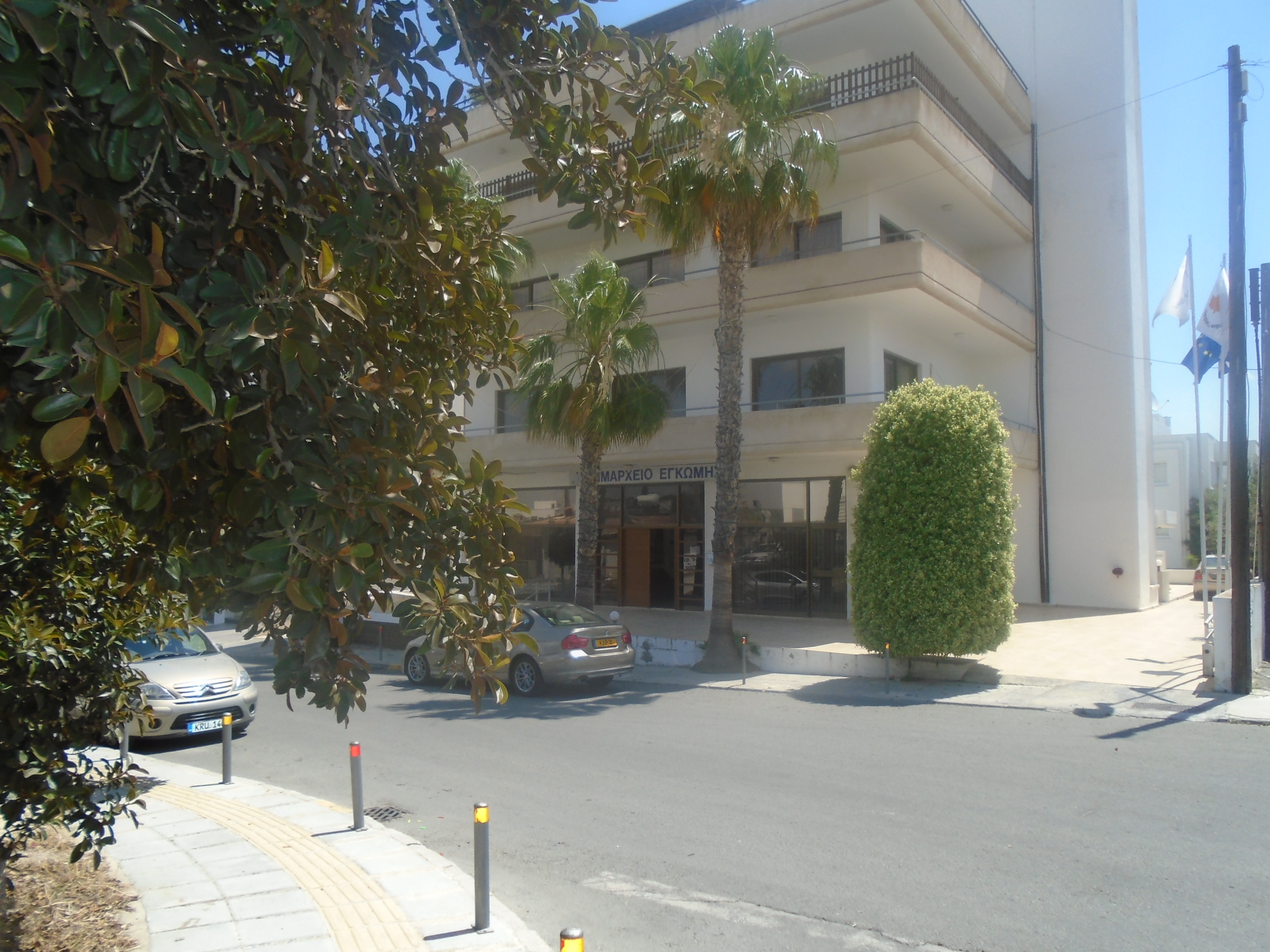
Town Hall of Engomi

Engomi became one of the "demes" or boroughs of Cyprus in February 1986 after a referendum held under the Municipalities Act of 1985 (Law 111/85). The first Mayor and Council were elected in the elections held in May 1986. The first elected Mayor was Mr Michalakis Zivanaris.

The municipal council consists of 12 Councillors and the Mayor, elected in elections held every five years, in the month of December, according to the Municipalities Act. The last municipal elections were held in 2011 and the mandate of the current council expires in December 2016.

The Town Hall is situated in Erechtheiou Street, no.3, 2413 Engomi, just off Grivas Diyeni Avenue.

== Makedonitissa ==
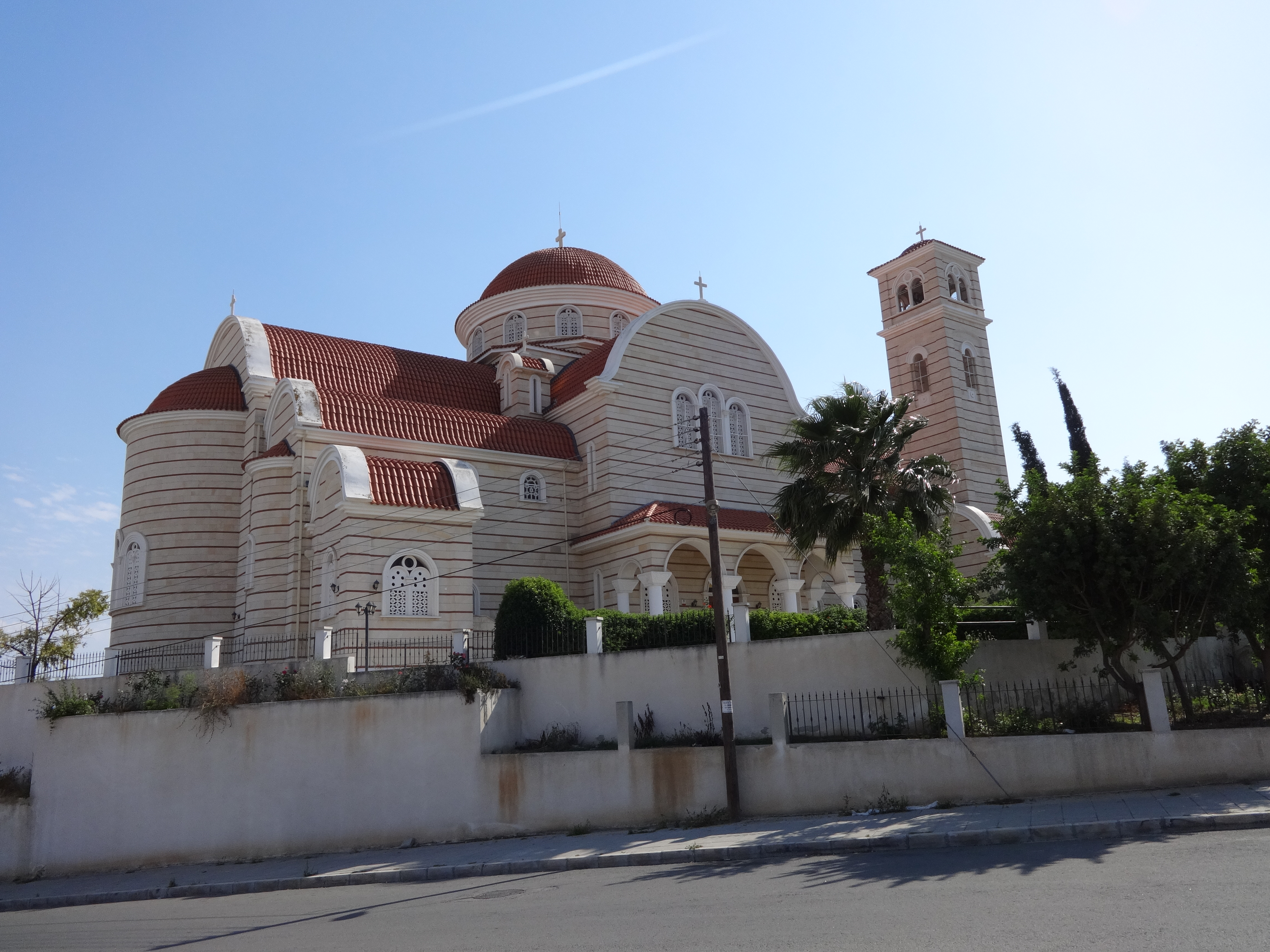
Ayios Panteleimon Church, Makedonitissa

The western part of the municipality of Engomi is known as Makedonitissa. It borders the Archangelos district of Strovolos, Lakatamia and Ayios Dometios. The name comes from the Holy Monastery of Panagia Makedonitissas.

=== Tymvos ===
Tymvos meaning "tomb" is a military cemetery for Greeks and Greek Cypriots who died in Cyprus in the struggles against the Turks in 1964 and 1974. The cemetery is on the site where on 22 July 1974 a Greek military plane was shot down by friendly fire. The plane, type "Noratlas", was carrying the 1st Commando Squadron of the Greek Armed Forces who came to Cyprus to defend the island during the invasion. The wreckage of the aircraft is buried beneath the mound in the cemetery.

=== Monastery of Panayia Makedonitissas ===
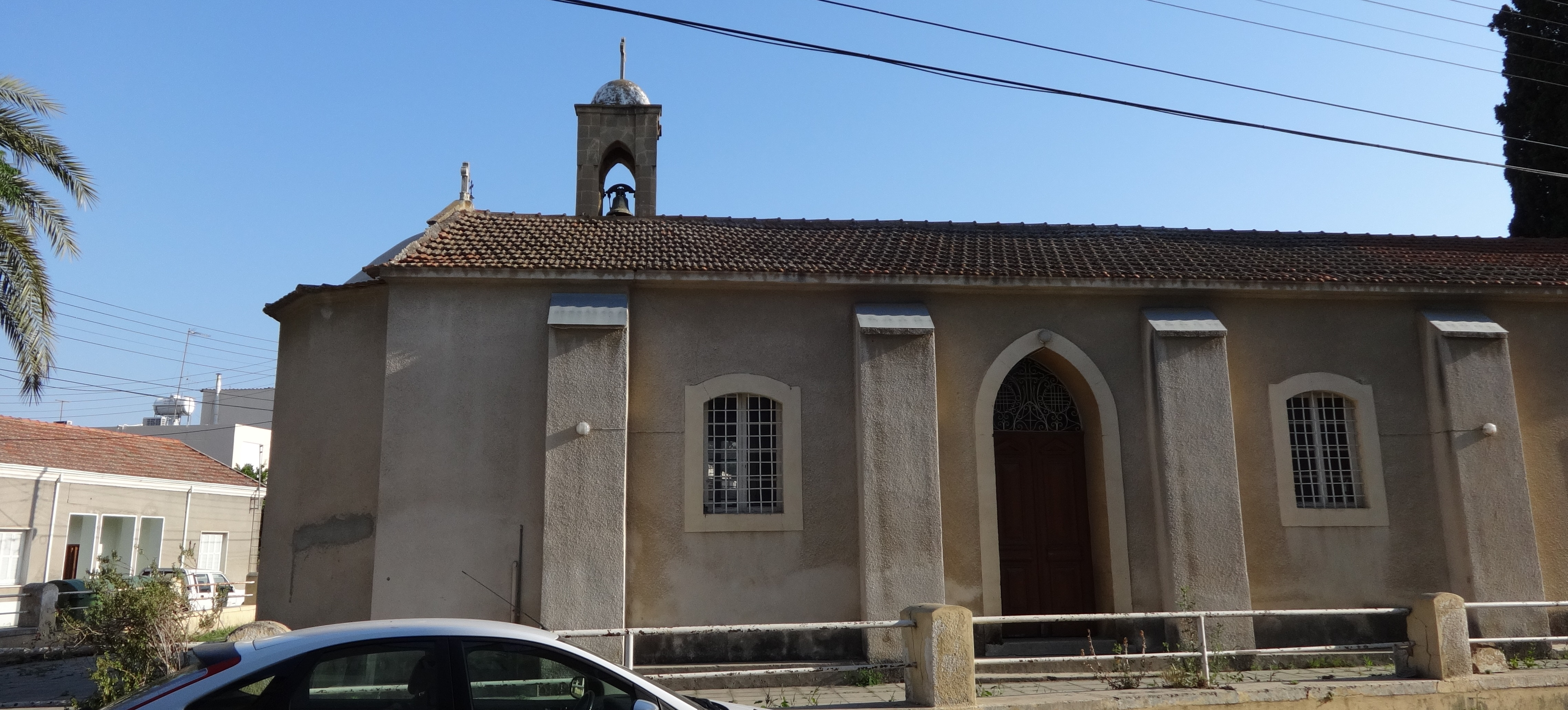
St. Nicholas old Church, Engomi

It is not known when the monastery of Panayia Makedonitissas was founded but it was first mentioned in the 16th century. It ceased to function in the late 19th century. The name, Makedonitissa, derives from the parsley plant that in Cyprus is called "makedonision". Today the site is occupied by the church Our Lady of Makedonitissas.

Also in Makedonitissa is the Makarios Stadium and the International Trade Fair exhibition site.

== Twinned cities ==
Engomi is twinned with:

- Eordaia, Greece (since 1992)
- Ithaki, Greece (since 1995)
- Chania, Greece (since 2001)
- Arbat, Russia (since 2007)
- Karpenisi, Greece (since 2022)
