= Nicos Solomonides Arena =

Indoor arena in Limassol, Cyprus

- To klouvi (The Cage) (Greek: Το κλουβί)
- Interactive map of Nicos Solomonides Arena
- Former names: Melford Arena
- Location: Limassol, Cyprus
- Coordinates: 34°40′11.65″N 33°01′35.59″E
- Owner: AEL Limassol
- Capacity: 2,500

Construction
- Built: 2005
- Opened: October 26, 2005

Tenant
- AEL BC

Nicos Solomonides Arena (Greek: Αίθουσα Νίκος Σολωμονίδης) is an indoor arena in Limassol, Cyprus. It is the home venue of AEL Limassol B.C. and has a capacity of 2,500 seats. The arena was named after club co-founder and president Nicos Solomonides.

The stadium has been renamed on occasion for sponsorship reasons. It was initially named "Melford Arena" and subsequently rebranded as "Limassol Cooperative Bank Arena", until finally the stadium reverted to being called "Nicos Solomonides Arena". Colloquially however, the stadium is referred to by basketball fans and officials alike as "To Klouvi" (Greek: Το κλουβί, lit. 'The cage'"), which refers to the claustrophobic atmosphere produced when the stadium is at maximum attendance. Various critics have asserted that the atmosphere created in the Arena leaves opponent teams at an unfair disadvantage due to the close proximity between themselves and AEL's supporters.

The stadium is also used by AEL's women's basketball and volleyball clubs.

== Facilities ==
At the moment, the Arena features the club's offices, official club shop, a cafe-restaurant named "Yellow Pride Cafe", a workout area and 12 VIP boxes. The arena also houses official club offices for AEL's other sports departments.

== Museum ==
In 2022, construction started on AEL Limassol Museum, which will include the Club's trophy cabinet with the trophies won by each of AEL's sports departments.
