= ETHA Engomis =

ETHA Engomis B.C.
- Leagues: Cypriot Championship, FIBA Europe Cup
- Founded: 1942; 84 years ago
- History: 1942–present
- Arena: Eleftheria Indoor Hall
- Capacity: 6,800
- Location: Engomi, Cyprus
- Team colors: Yellow, Black
- Head coach: (Cyprus) Michael Zakou
- Championships: 2 Cypriot League; 3 Cypriot Cup; 1 Cypriot SuperCup
- Website: ethabc-engomi.net
Home	Away

ETHA Engomis (in Greek: Ε.Θ.Α. Έγκωμης ), is a professional basketball club based in Engomi, Cyprus. The club competes in the Cypriot League.

== History ==
The club was founded in 1942. It took nearly seven decades to win its first trophy, in 2011, when it won its first Cypriot Cup and also its first Cypriot League.

== Players ==
=== Current roster ===
ETHA Engomis Roster
Players
Coaches

Pos.	Νο.	Nat.	Name	Ht.
G/F	23	(Cyprus)	Kyriakides, Michalis (C)	1.95 m (6 ft 5 in)
F	--	(United States)	Hightower, Cory	2.01 m (6 ft 7 in)
F	--	(United States)	Stevenson, Tyler	2.03 m (6 ft 8 in)
PG	--	(United States)	Jenkins Jr., David	1.85 m (6 ft 1 in)
G	--	(United States)	Reed Jr., Eric	1.85 m (6 ft 1 in)
G	--	(Cyprus)	Hatzikostas, Christos	1.85 m (6 ft 1 in)
G	--	(Cyprus)	Konstantinou, Andreas	1.88 m (6 ft 2 in)

Head coach

- (Cyprus) Christoforos Livadiotes

Assistant coach

- (Cyprus) Elhajj Hadi

Legend

- (C) Team captain

=== Notable players ===
- (United States) Reggie Redding ◆
- (United States) Alex Wesby ◆
- (United States) Mike King ◆
- (United States) C.J. Williams ◆

Notes
◆ Played at least one official international match for their national team at any time.
◆ Set a club record or won an individual award while at the club.
◆ To perform very successfully during period in the club or at later/previous stages of his career.
