= 2017–18 FIBA Europe Cup Play-offs =

Basketball competition play-offs

2017–18 FIBA Europe Cup play-offs will begin on 7 March and conclude on 25 April and 2 May 2018 with the 2018 FIBA Europe Cup Finals, to decide the champions of the 2017–18 FIBA Europe Cup. A total of 16 teams will compete in the play-offs.

== Format ==
The play-offs involves 16 teams which qualified as winners or second placed of each one of the four groups in the second round.

Each tie in the knockout phase, is played over two legs, with each team playing one leg at home.

The draw will be made without any restriction or seeding, being decided all the bracket by the luck of the draw in the round of 16. If two teams from the same previous round are paired, the team with the best record in the last round would play the second leg at home. If a FIBA Europe Cup team is drawn against a Basketball Champions League team, the FIBA Europe Cup side would have the home-court advantage in the second leg. This rule apply for all the rounds of the play-offs.

== Qualified teams ==
=== Teams from the second round ===
The four group winners and second-placed teams from the second round advanced to the play-offs. In case of vacants due to opt-out options of teams transferred from the Basketball Champions League, these places would be filled with the best third-qualified teams.

Group	Winners	Runners-up	Third
I	(France) ESSM Le Portel	(Russia) Nizhny Novgorod	
J	(Hungary) Alba Fehérvár	(Hungary) Egis Körmend	
K	(Denmark) Bakken Bears	(Belarus) Tsmoki-Minsk	(Montenegro) Mornar
L	(Netherlands) Donar	(Romania) U-BT Cluj-Napoca	(Cyprus) Keravnos

==== Standings ====
Pos	Grp	Team	Pld	W	L	PF	PA	PD
1	I	(France) ESSM Le Portel	6	6	0	496	403	+93
2	J	(Hungary) Alba Fehérvár	6	5	1	500	462	+38
3	L	(Netherlands) Donar	6	4	2	511	444	+67
4	K	(Denmark) Bakken Bears	6	4	2	509	536	−27
5	K	(Belarus) Tsmoki-Minsk	6	3	3	472	429	+43
6	I	(Russia) Nizhny Novgorod	6	3	3	491	478	+13
7	L	(Romania) U-BT Cluj-Napoca	6	3	3	455	468	−13
8	J	(Hungary) Egis Körmend	6	3	3	461	483	−22
9	L	(Cyprus) Keravnos	6	3	3	437	463	−26
10	K	(Montenegro) Mornar	6	3	3	461	497	−36

Source: FIBA Europe Cup

=== Transfers from Champions League regular season ===
Eight teams from the 2017–18 Basketball Champions League Regular season transfer to the FIBA Europe Cup. These include the fifth and sixth-placed teams. Movistar Estudiantes, Élan Chalon, AEK Athens and SIG Strasbourg, had opt-out clauses from playing in the FIBA Europe Cup and in the event of them claiming fifth or sixth place, their spot would be filled by the best-ranked third-placed teams from the second round.

Group	Fifth place	Sixth place
A	(Italy) Dinamo Sassari	(Lithuania) Juventus
B	(Latvia) Ventspils	(France) ~~Élan Chalon~~
C	(Spain) ~~Movistar Estudiantes~~	(Italy) Umana Reyer Venezia
D	(Italy) Sidigas Scandone	(Belgium) Oostende

==== Standings ====
Pos	Grp	Team	Pld	W	L	PF	PA	PD
1	C	(Italy) Umana Reyer Venezia	14	8	6	1146	1140	+6
2	A	(Italy) Dinamo Sassari	14	7	7	1158	1174	−16
3	D	(Italy) Sidigas Scandone	14	6	8	1049	1028	+21
4	B	(Latvia) Ventspils	14	6	8	1034	1085	−51
5	D	(Belgium) Oostende	14	6	8	975	1050	−75
6	A	(Lithuania) Juventus	14	4	10	1105	1193	−88

Source: FIBA Europe Cup

== Bracket ==
Round of 16
(Lithuania) Juventus	87	76	163
(Hungary) Alba Fehérvár	74	78	152
(Italy) Sidigas Scandone	70	81	151
(Belarus) Tsmoki-Minsk	70	72	142
(Latvia) Ventspils	73	81	154
(Denmark) Bakken Bears	93	75	168
(Italy) Dinamo Sassari	72	81	153
(France) ESSM Le Portel	55	100	155
(Italy) Reyer Venezia	83	86	169
(Hungary) Egis Körmend	51	88	139
(Cyprus) Keravnos	62	61	123
(Russia) Nizhny Novgorod	77	71	148
(Belgium) Oostende	84	63	147
(Montenegro) Mornar	71	90	161
(Netherlands) Donar	103	76	179
(Romania) U-BT Cluj-Napoca	76	69	145

Quarter-finals
(Lithuania) Juventus	77	68	145
(Italy) Sidigas Scandone	77	85	162
(Denmark) Bakken Bears	76	80	156
(France) ESSM Le Portel	62	86	148
(Italy) Reyer Venezia	86	90	176
(Russia) Nizhny Novgorod	76	94	170
(Montenegro) Mornar	73	74	147
(Netherlands) Donar	67	101	168

Semi-finals
(Italy) Sidigas Scandone	75	82	157
(Denmark) Bakken Bears	72	72	144
(Italy) Reyer Venezia	82	80	162
(Netherlands) Donar	72	83	155

Finals
(Italy) Sidigas Scandone	69	79	148
(Italy) Reyer Venezia	77	81	158

== Round of 16 ==
The first legs will be played on 6 and 7 March, and the second legs will be played on 13 and 14 March 2017. Team 2 plays the second leg at home.

Team 1	Agg.	Team 2	1st leg	2nd leg
Keravnos (Cyprus)	123–148	(Russia) Nizhny Novgorod	62–77	61–71
Sidigas Scandone (Italy)	151–142	(Belarus) Tsmoki-Minsk	70–70	81–72
Dinamo Sassari (Italy)	153–155	(France) ESSM Le Portel	72–55	81–100
Oostende (Belgium)	147–161	(Montenegro) Mornar	84–71	63–90
Donar (Netherlands)	179–145	(Romania) U-BT Cluj-Napoca	103–76	76–69
Ventspils (Latvia)	154–168	(Denmark) Bakken Bears	73–93	81–75
Juventus (Lithuania)	163–152	(Hungary) Alba Fehérvár	87–74	76–78
Umana Reyer Venezia (Italy)	169–139	(Hungary) Egis Körmend	83–51	86–88

Notes

1. Order of legs reversed after original draw, requested by Donar due to the no availability of their home arena for the second leg.

=== First leg ===
6 March 2018	Donar (Netherlands)	103–76	(Romania) U-BT Cluj-Napoca	Groningen
19:00	Scoring by quarter: 19–20, 27–14, 33–21, 24–21
	Pts: Curry 26; Rebs: Koenis 9 Asts: Curry 9 Eff: Curry 33	Boxscore	Pts: Kromah 20; Rebs: Šakić 6 Asts: Watson 4 Eff: Rašić 16	Arena: MartiniPlaza; Attendance: 4,350; Referees: Vilius Mačiulaitis (LTU), Anastasios Manos (GRE), Hugues Thépénier (FRA)

7 March 2018	Juventus (Lithuania)	87–74	(Hungary) Alba Fehérvár	Utena
17:30	Scoring by quarter: 29–6, 25–28, 15–20, 13–20
	Pts: Gaines 25; Rebs: Dendy 8 Asts: Šikšnius 6 Eff: Dendy 28	Boxscore	Pts: Hill 18; Rebs: Lóránt 9 Asts: Mohammed, Simpson 4 Eff: Lóránt 20	Arena: Utena Arena; Attendance: 1,013; Referees: Sergey Krug (RUS), Ivor Matějek (CZE), Ville Selkee (FIN)

7 March 2018	Keravnos (Cyprus)	62–77	(Russia) Nizhny Novgorod	Strovolos
18:00	Scoring by quarter: 16–22, 13–17, 18–19, 15–19
	Pts: Abukar 21; Rebs: Parks 6 Asts: Ross 5 Eff: Abukar, Parks 14	Boxscore	Pts: Gubanov, Jelovac 18; Rebs: Veremeenko 11; Asts: Strebkov 9 Eff: Jelovac 24	Arena: Costas Papaellinas; Attendance: 500; Referees: Aliaksandr Syrytsa (BLR), Vladimir Jevtović (SRB), Marek Kúkelčík (SVK)

7 March 2018	Ventspils (Latvia)	73–93	(Denmark) Bakken Bears	Ventspils
18:00	Scoring by quarter: 22–14, 16–28, 22–27, 13–24
	Pts: Ubilla 19; Rebs: Gulbis, Ubilla 5 Asts: Ubilla 4 Eff: Ubilla 26	Boxscore	Pts: Akoon-Purcell 23; Rebs: Crockett 12; Asts: Akoon-Purcell 6 Eff: Akoon-Purcell, Diouf 24	Arena: Olympic Center; Attendance: 950; Referees: Chris Dodds (GBR), Sigmundur Herbertsson (ISL), Martin Vulić (CRO)

7 March 2018	Sidigas Scandone (Italy)	70–70	(Belarus) Tsmoki-Minsk	Avellino
20:30	Scoring by quarter: 17–18, 15–12, 13–25, 25–15
	Pts: Fesenko 24; Rebs: Fesenko 15; Asts: Filloy 6 Eff: Fesenko 32	Boxscore	Pts: Gray, Kravish 16; Rebs: Kravish 8 Asts: Gaulden-Saddler 5 Eff: Kravish 21	Arena: Giacomo Del Mauro; Attendance: 3,300; Referees: Petr Hrůša (CZE), Mehmet Karabilecen (TUR), Charalampos Karakatsounis (GRE)

7 March 2018	Dinamo Sassari (Italy)	72–55	(France) ESSM Le Portel	Sassari
20:30	Scoring by quarter: 6–18, 21–14, 19–15, 26–8
	Pts: Bostic 20; Rebs: Polonara 8 Asts: Bamforth 5 Eff: Bostic, Polonara 22	Boxscore	Pts: Golden 11; Rebs: Hassell 8 Asts: Chathuant 4 Eff: Chathuant 10	Arena: Roberta Serradimigni; Attendance: 2,629; Referees: Boris Krejić (SLO), Zdravko Rutešić (MNE), Marko Vučković (SLO)

7 March 2018	Oostende (Belgium)	84–71	(Montenegro) Mornar	Ostend
20:30	Scoring by quarter: 22–20, 18–17, 25–18, 19–16
	Pts: Myers 17; Rebs: Myers 8 Asts: Đorđević 6 Eff: Myers 19	Boxscore	Pts: Needham 23; Rebs: Vujošević 9 Asts: Raley-Ross 5 Eff: Vujošević, Raley-Ross 17	Arena: Sleuyter Arena; Attendance: 1,896; Referees: Marek Maliszewski (POL), Francisco Araña (ESP), Gytis Vilius (LTU)

7 March 2018	Umana Reyer Venezia (Italy)	83–51	(Hungary) Egis Körmend	Venice
20:30	Scoring by quarter: 16–19, 23–9, 21–13, 23–10
	Pts: Perić 13; Rebs: Watt 6 Asts: three players 3 Eff: Watt, Tonut 15	Boxscore	Pts: Hollins 11; Rebs: Wright 6 Asts: Wright 3 Eff: Horti 11	Arena: Giuseppe Taliercio; Attendance: 3,000; Referees: Borys Shulga (UKR), Vladimir Tsekov (BUL), Blaž Zupančič (SLO)

=== Second leg ===
13 March 2018	Alba Fehérvár (Hungary)	78–76 (152–163 agg.)	(Lithuania) Juventus	Székesfehérvár
18:00	Scoring by quarter: 25–21, 21–19, 17–18, 15–18
	Pts: three players 14; Rebs: Keller 7 Asts: Kovács 6 Eff: Hill 14	Boxscore	Pts: Buterlevičius 20; Rebs: Kupšas 9 Asts: Bičkauskis 7 Eff: Kupšas 21	Arena: Alba Regia Sportcsarnok; Attendance: 1,500; Referees: Alexandru Olaru (ROU), Ognjen Jokić (MNE), Ilias Kounelles (CYP)

14 March 2018	Nizhny Novgorod (Russia)	71–61 (148–123 agg.)	(Cyprus) Keravnos	Nizhny Novgorod
17:00	Scoring by quarter: 17–17, 19–14, 18–14, 17–16
	Pts: Jelovac 17; Rebs: Veremeenko 9 Asts: Odum 7 Eff: Veremeenko 21	Boxscore	Pts: Abukar 23; Rebs: Parks 12; Asts: Barker 5 Eff: Parks 21	Arena: Trade Union Sport Palace; Attendance: 1,154; Referees: Vilius Mačiulaitis (LTU), Christoph Rohacky (AUT), Ville Selkee (FIN)

14 March 2018	Tsmoki-Minsk (Belarus)	72–81 (142–151 agg.)	(Italy) Sidigas Scandone	Minsk
17:00	Scoring by quarter: 14–24, 18–13, 16–20, 24–24
	Pts: Kudrautsu 17; Rebs: Kravish 13; Asts: Adamović 5 Eff: Kravish 26	Boxscore	Pts: Filloy 22; Rebs: Wells, Zerini 5 Asts: Leunen 6 Eff: Filloy 26	Arena: Minsk Arena; Attendance: 1,246; Referees: Anastasios Piloidis (GRE), Ilya Putenko (RUS), Ciprian Stoica (ROU)

14 March 2018	U-BT Cluj-Napoca (Romania)	69–76 (145–179 agg.)	(Netherlands) Donar	Cluj-Napoca
18:00	Scoring by quarter: 22–13, 19–24, 11–22, 17–17
	Pts: Šakić, Watson 13; Rebs: Šakić 13; Asts: three players 3 Eff: Šakić 20	Boxscore	Pts: Pašalić 20; Rebs: Slagter 7 Asts: Curry 8 Eff: Slagter 22	Arena: Polyvalent Hall; Attendance: 1,530; Referees: Tomislav Vovk (CRO), Pavel Fuska (SVK), Rune Ressel Larsen (DEN)

14 March 2018	Bakken Bears (Denmark)	75–81 (168–154 agg.)	(Latvia) Ventspils	Aarhus
18:30	Scoring by quarter: 19–26, 15–13, 20–23, 21–19
	Pts: Crockett 23; Rebs: Crockett 9 Asts: Akoon-Purcell 5 Eff: Crockett 26	Boxscore	Pts: Lomažs, Ubilla 15; Rebs: Ubilla 5 Asts: Ubilla 4 Eff: Ubilla 16	Arena: Vejlby-Risskov Hallen; Attendance: 1,900; Referees: Sergiy Chebyshev (UKR), Wojciech Liszka (POL), Zdravko Rutešić (MNE)

14 March 2018	Egis Körmend (Hungary)	88–86 (139–169 agg.)	(Italy) Umana Reyer Venezia	Körmend
19:10	Scoring by quarter: 22–29, 23–23, 20–12, 23–22
	Pts: Ferencz 18; Rebs: Horti 11; Asts: Wright 9 Eff: Ferencz 21	Boxscore	Pts: Tonut 24; Rebs: Daye, Perić 4 Asts: Daye, De Nicolao 5 Eff: Tonut 28	Arena: Szentély Aréna; Attendance: 2,000; Referees: Petar Denkovski (MKD), Uroš Nikolić (SRB), Arnis Ozols (LAT)

14 March 2018	ESSM Le Portel (France)	100–81(OT) (155–153 agg.)	(Italy) Dinamo Sassari	Le Portel
20:00	Scoring by quarter: 22–20, 25–18, 27–14, 14–19, Overtime: 12–10
	Pts: Hassell 33; Rebs: Hassell 12; Asts: Carter, Golden 7 Eff: Hassell 37	Boxscore	Pts: Bamforth, Hatcher 16; Rebs: Jones 9 Asts: Bostic 6 Eff: three players 14	Arena: Le Chaudron; Attendance: 3,500; Referees: Marek Maliszewski (POL), Sébastien Clivaz (SUI), Paulo Marques (POR)

14 March 2018	Mornar (Montenegro)	90–63 (161–147 agg.)	(Belgium) Oostende	Bar
20:30	Scoring by quarter: 24–14, 19–19, 30–16, 17–14
	Pts: Vranješ 29; Rebs: Pavić 12; Asts: Raley-Ross, Vranješ 4 Eff: Vranješ 28	Boxscore	Pts: Kesteloot 14; Rebs: Fieler 7 Asts: Fieler 4 Eff: Fieler 17	Arena: Topolica; Attendance: 1,500; Referees: Aleksandar Milojević (MKD), Anastasios Manos (GRE), Ivan Miličević (BIH)

== Quarterfinals ==
The first legs will be played on 20 and 21 March, and the second legs will be played on 27 and 28 March 2018. Team 2 plays the second leg at home.

Team 1	Agg.	Team 2	1st leg	2nd leg
Umana Reyer Venezia (Italy)	176–170	(Russia) Nizhny Novgorod	86–76	90–94
Juventus (Lithuania)	145–162	(Italy) Sidigas Scandone	77–77	68–85
Bakken Bears (Denmark)	156–148	(France) ESSM Le Portel	76–62	80–86
Mornar (Montenegro)	147–168	(Netherlands) Donar	73–67	74–101

=== First leg ===
20 March 2018	Bakken Bears (Denmark)	76–62	(France) ESSM Le Portel	Aarhus
18:30	Scoring by quarter: 20–17, 22–18, 20–15, 14–12
	Pts: Crockett 21; Rebs: Crockett 9 Asts: Jukić, Wiggins 4 Eff: Crockett 23	Boxscore	Pts: Golden 17; Rebs: Traoré 8 Asts: Golden 4 Eff: Hassell 17	Arena: Vejlby-Risskov Hallen; Attendance: 1,930; Referees: Srđan Dožai (CRO), Luka Kardum (CRO), Oskars Lucis (LAT)

21 March 2018	Juventus (Lithuania)	77–77	(Italy) Sidigas Scandone	Utena
17:30	Scoring by quarter: 21–14, 15–24, 24–22, 17–17
	Pts: Gaines 18; Rebs: Korniyenko 10; Asts: Šikšnius 5 Eff: Korniyenko 24	Boxscore	Pts: Wells 17; Rebs: Fesenko, Scrubb 6 Asts: Leunen 8 Eff: Leunen 19	Arena: Utena Arena; Attendance: 1,200; Referees: Aleksandar Glišić (SRB), Haris Bijedić (BIH), Apostolos Kalpakas (SWE)

21 March 2018	Mornar (Montenegro)	73–67	(Netherlands) Donar	Bar
19:30	Scoring by quarter: 18–10, 19–30, 15–12, 21–15
	Pts: Needham 20; Rebs: Vujošević 16; Asts: Raley-Ross 3 Eff: Vujošević 25	Boxscore	Pts: Pašalić 15; Rebs: Curry 10; Asts: Curry 5 Eff: Pašalić 17	Arena: Topolica; Attendance: 1,500; Referees: Marius Ciulin (ROU), Mārtiņš Kozlovskis (LAT), Sergiy Zashchuk (UKR)

21 March 2018	Umana Reyer Venezia (Italy)	86–76	(Russia) Nizhny Novgorod	Venice
20:30	Scoring by quarter: 20–19, 22–16, 25–23, 19–18
	Pts: Perić 26; Rebs: Bramos 13; Asts: Haynes 9 Eff: Perić 27	Boxscore	Pts: Jelovac 28; Rebs: Jelovac 12; Asts: Strebkov 6 Eff: Jelovac 28	Arena: Giuseppe Taliercio; Attendance: 2,500; Referees: Georgios Poursanidis (GRE), Boris Krejić (SLO), Özlem Yalman (TUR)

=== Second leg ===
27 March 2018	ESSM Le Portel (France)	86–80(OT) (148–156 agg.)	(Denmark) Bakken Bears	Le Portel
20:00	Scoring by quarter: 25–17, 19–16, 20–13, 14–18, Overtime: 8–16
	Pts: Golden 25; Rebs: three players 7 Asts: Carter 6 Eff: Hachad, Traoré 24	Boxscore	Pts: Akoon-Purcell 19; Rebs: Crockett 17; Asts: Akoon-Purcell 8 Eff: Crockett 25	Arena: Le Chaudron; Attendance: 3,533; Referees: Aleksandar Glišić (SRB), Jasmina Juras (SRB), Fernando Calatrava (ESP)

28 March 2018	Nizhny Novgorod (Russia)	94–90 (170–176 agg.)	(Italy) Umana Reyer Venezia	Nizhny Novgorod
18:00	Scoring by quarter: 20–22, 29–25, 22–23, 23–20
	Pts: Jelovac 38; Rebs: Jelovac 15; Asts: Odum 7 Eff: Jelovac 45	Boxscore	Pts: Haynes 21; Rebs: Daye 5 Asts: De Nicolao 4 Eff: Biligha, De Nicolao 19	Arena: Trade Union Sport Palace; Attendance: 1,935; Referees: Panagiotis Anastopoulos (GRE), Gintaras Vitkauskas (LTU), Yener Yılmaz (TUR)

28 March 2018	Donar (Netherlands)	101–74 (168–147 agg.)	(Montenegro) Mornar	Groningen
19:30	Scoring by quarter: 25–20, 27–14, 18–20, 31–20
	Pts: Curry 19; Rebs: Burges, Koenis 7 Asts: Cunningham 9 Eff: Curry 26	Boxscore	Pts: Needham 24; Rebs: Bakić, Mićović 4 Asts: Raley-Ross 2 Eff: Vranješ 22	Arena: MartiniPlaza; Attendance: 4,350; Referees: Marek Ćmikiewicz (POL), Nicolas Maestre (FRA), Tanel Suslov (EST)

28 March 2018	Sidigas Scandone (Italy)	85–68 (162–145 agg.)	(Lithuania) Juventus	Avellino
20:30	Scoring by quarter: 19–15, 31–8, 15–23, 20–22
	Pts: D'Ercole 17; Rebs: Leunen 8 Asts: Fitipaldo 8 Eff: three players 16	Boxscore	Pts: Korniienko 18; Rebs: Korniienko 12; Asts: Bičkauskis 8 Eff: Korniienko 28	Arena: Giacomo del Mauro; Attendance: 3,400; Referees: Vicente Bultó (ESP), Markos Michaelides (SUI), Zafer Yılmaz (TUR)

== Semifinals ==
The first legs will be played on 11 April, and the second legs will be played on 18 and 19 April 2018. Team 2 plays the second leg at home.

Team 1	Agg.	Team 2	1st leg	2nd leg
Umana Reyer Venezia (Italy)	162–155	(Netherlands) Donar	82–72	80–83
Sidigas Scandone (Italy)	157–144	(Denmark) Bakken Bears	75–72	82–72

=== First leg ===
11 April 2018	Umana Reyer Venezia (Italy)	82–72	(Netherlands) Donar	Venice
20:30	Scoring by quarter: 28–21, 14–22, 24–14, 16–15
	Pts: Ress 14; Rebs: Daye 9 Asts: Haynes 7 Eff: Haynes, Watt 16	Boxscore	Pts: Pašalić 20; Rebs: Burgess 11; Asts: Curry 5 Eff: Burgess 20	Arena: Giuseppe Taliercio; Attendance: 3,300; Referees: Srđan Dožai (CRO), Markos Michaelides (SUI), Andrei Sharapa (BLR)

11 April 2018	Sidigas Scandone (Italy)	75–72	(Denmark) Bakken Bears	Avellino
20:30	Scoring by quarter: 15–15, 22–16, 28–21, 10–20
	Pts: Rich 28; Rebs: Rich 8 Asts: Leunen 6 Eff: Rich 30	Boxscore	Pts: Diouf 26; Rebs: Akoon-Purcell, Bishop 7 Asts: Darboe 7 Eff: Diouf 28	Arena: Giacomo del Mauro; Attendance: 3,800; Referees: Marius Ciulin (ROU), Marek Ćmikiewicz (POL), Uroš Nikolić (SRB)

=== Second leg ===
18 April 2018	Bakken Bears (Denmark)	72–82 (144–157 agg.)	(Italy) Sidigas Scandone	Aarhus
18:30	Scoring by quarter: 15–18, 18–30, 22–12, 17–22
	Pts: Jukić 17; Rebs: Diouf 10; Asts: Akoon-Purcell 6 Eff: Bishop 19	Boxscore	Pts: Fesenko 19; Rebs: Rich 7 Asts: Rich 5 Eff: Fesenko 22	Arena: Vejlby-Risskov Hallen; Attendance: 2,250; Referees: Yohan Rosso (FRA), Sergiy Zashchuk (UKR), Mārtiņš Kozlovskis (LAT)

19 April 2018	Donar (Netherlands)	83–80 (155–162 agg.)	(Italy) Umana Reyer Venezia	Groningen
19:30	Scoring by quarter: 24–24, 20–17, 17–17, 22–22
	Pts: Curry 23; Rebs: Bruinsma 8 Asts: Curry 3 Eff: Bruinsma 23	Boxscore	Pts: Bramos 16; Rebs: Watt 8 Asts: De Nicolao 4 Eff: Watt 19	Arena: MartiniPlaza; Attendance: 4,350; Referees: Aleksandar Glišić (SRB), Gentian Cici (ALB), Luka Kardum (CRO)

== Finals ==
The first legs will be played on 25 April, and the second legs will be played on 2 May 2018. Team 2 plays the second leg at home.

Team 1	Agg.	Team 2	1st leg	2nd leg
Sidigas Scandone (Italy)	148–158	(Italy) Umana Reyer Venezia	69–77	79–81
