= 2018 FIBA Europe Cup Finals =

- Event: 2017–18 FIBA Europe Cup
Sidigas Scandone	Umana Reyer Venezia
(Italy)	(Italy)
148	158

First leg
Sidigas Scandone	Umana Reyer Venezia
69	77
- Date: 25 April 2018
- Venue: Palasport Giacomo Del Mauro, Avellino
- Referees: Antonio Conde (ESP), Georgios Poursanidis (GRE), Yener Yılmaz (TUR)
- Attendance: 5,000

Second leg
Umana Reyer Venezia	Sidigas Scandone
81	79
- Date: 2 May 2018
- Venue: Palasport Giuseppe Taliercio, Venice
- Referees: Vicente Bultó (ESP), Saša Maričić (SRB), Panagiotis Anastopoulos (GRE)
- Attendance: 3,510

The 2018 FIBA Europe Cup Finals was the concluding games of the 2017–18 FIBA Europe Cup season. The Finals were played in a two-legged format, with the first leg played on April 25 and the second one on 2 May 2018.

For the second consecutive time, two teams from the same country met in the final.

== Venue ==
The Palasport Giacomo Del Mauro was the first venue. The Palasport originally had a 3,600 seating capacity. It was expanded to a 5,300 seating capacity in 2008, specifically in order to meet the minimum capacity requirements for EuroLeague games, which require an arena of at least 5,000 seats. In 2008, the arena's usage rights were also entrusted to Air Avellino, for a period of ten years.

The Palasport Giuseppe Taliercio in Venice, the venue for the second leg, opened in 1978. It was used as one of the host arenas of the 1979 EuroBasket. It has most notably been used as the home arena of the Italian basketball club, Reyer Venezia Mestre, of the Lega Basket Serie A. The Italian club Basket Mestre 1958 also used the arena at one time.

Avellino	2018 FIBA Europe Cup Finals (Europe)	Venice
Palasport Del Mauro	2018 FIBA Europe Cup Finals (Europe)	Palasport Giuseppe Taliercio
Capacity: 5,600	2018 FIBA Europe Cup Finals (Europe)	Capacity: 3,509

== Road to the Finals ==
Note: In the table, the score of the finalist is given first (H = home; A = away).

(Italy) Sidigas Scandone				Round	(Italy) Reyer Venezia			
Basketball Champions League; Group D: Pos / Team / Pld / Pts; 1 / (Turkey) Beşiktaş Sompo Japan / 14 / 24; 2 / (Czech Republic) ČEZ Nymburk / 14 / 24; 3 / (France) Nanterre 92 / 14 / 23; 4 / (Poland) Stelmet Enea Zielona Góra / 14 / 20; 5 / (Italy) Sidigas Scandone / 14 / 20; 6 / (Belgium) Oostende / 14 / 20; 7 / (Germany) Telekom Baskets Bonn / 14 / 19; 8 / (Greece) Aris / 14 / 18; Source: Basketball Champions League				Regular season	Basketball Champions League; Group C: Pos / Team / Pld / Pts; 1 / (France) SIG Strasbourg / 14 / 23; 2 / (Turkey) Banvit / 14 / 23; 3 / (Greece) AEK Athens / 14 / 22; 4 / (Germany) medi bayreuth / 14 / 22; 5 / (Spain) Movistar Estudiantes / 14 / 22; 6 / (Italy) Umana Reyer Venezia / 14 / 22; 7 / (Slovenia) Petrol Olimpija / 14 / 18; 8 / (Poland) Rosa Radom / 14 / 16; Source: Basketball Champions League			
Opponent	Agg.	1st leg	2nd leg	Play-offs	Opponent	Agg.	1st leg	2nd leg
(Belarus) Tsmoki-Minsk	151–142	70–70 (H)	72–81 (A)	Round of 16	(Hungary) Egis Körmend	169–139	83–51 (H)	88–86 (A)
(Lithuania) Juventus	162–145	77–77 (A)	85–68 (H)	Quarterfinals	(Russia) Nizhny Novgorod	176–170	86–76 (H)	94–90 (A)
(Denmark) Bakken Bears	157–144	75–72 (H)	72–82 (A)	Semifinals	(Netherlands) Donar	162–155	82–72 (H)	83–80 (A)

== First leg ==
25 April 2018	Sidigas Scandone (Italy)	69–77	(Italy) Umana Reyer Venezia	Avellino, Italy
20:30 (UTC+2)	Scoring by quarter: 25–25, 15–23, 15–15, 14–14
	Pts: Fesenko 19; Rebs: Leunen 11; Asts: Filloy 6 Eff: Fesenko 24	Boxscore	Pts: Daye 14; Rebs: Perić 7 Asts: Haynes 5 Eff: Daye 18	Arena: Palasport Del Mauro; Attendance: 5,000; Referees: Antonio Conde (ESP), Georgios Poursanidis (GRE), Yener Yılmaz (TUR)

Starters:			Pts	Reb	Ast
PG	6	(Argentina) Bruno Fitipaldo	3	0	2
SG	9	(United States) Jason Rich	16	4	3
SF	1	(United States) Dez Wells	18	2	1
PF	10	(United States) Maarty Leunen	5	12	5
C	44	(Ukraine) Kyrylo Fesenko	19	7	2
Reserves:					
F/C	0	(Italy) Andrea Zerini	0	1	0
G/F	7	(Italy) Andrea Bianco	DNP		
C	9	(Nigeria) Shane Lawal	2	8	0
F	11	(Canada) Thomas Scrubb	2	1	0
G	12	(Italy) Ariel Filloy	4	2	6
G	24	(Italy) Lorenzo D'Ercole	0	0	0
G	57	(Italy) Salvatore Parlato	DNP		
Head coach:
(Italian Basketball Federation) Stefano Sacripanti

Scandone	Reyer

Scandone	Statistics	Reyer
24/40 (60%)	2-pt field goals	20/40 (50%)
4/20 (20%)	3-pt field goals	10/23 (43.5%)
9/17 (52.9%)	Free throws	7/9 (77.8%)
14	Offensive rebounds	8
26	Defensive rebounds	22
40	Total rebounds	30
19	Assists	18
14	Turnovers	8
5	Steals	6
4	Blocks	4
16	Fouls	23

Starters:			Pts	Reb	Ast
PG	0	(Georgia (country)) MarQuez Haynes	2	2	5
SG	30	(Italy) Bruno Cerella	10	0	1
SG	7	(Italy) Stefano Tonut	5	0	2
PF	9	(United States) Austin Daye	14	4	1
C	50	(United States) Mitchell Watt	13	3	0
Reserves:					
F	2	(Croatia) Hrvoje Perić	6	7	2
G	3	(United States) Dominique Johnson	6	7	2
G/F	6	(Greece) Michael Bramos	5	4	1
G	11	(United States) Michael Jenkins	5	2	1
F/C	14	(United States) Tomas Ress	DNP		
C	19	(Italy) Paul Biligha	4	1	1
Head coach:
(Italian Basketball Federation) Walter De Raffaele

- Team captains (C): (United States) Maarty Leunen (Sidigas Scandone) and (United States) Tomas Ress (Reyer Venezia)

== Second leg ==
2 May 2018	Umana Reyer Venezia (Italy)	81–79 (158–148 agg.)	(Italy) Sidigas Scandone	Venice, Italy
20:00 (UTC+2)	Scoring by quarter: 15–13, 26–19, 22–29, 18–18
	Pts: Haynes, Perić 16; Rebs: Biligha 5 Asts: Haynes 3 Eff: Daye, Perić 14	Boxscore	Pts: Rich 32; Rebs: Fesenko 15; Asts: Rich 5 Eff: Fesenko 33	Arena: Palasport Giuseppe Taliercio; Attendance: 3,510; Referees: Vicente Bultó (ESP), Saša Maričić (SRB), Panagiotis Anastopoulos (GRE)

Starters:			Pts	Reb	Ast
PG	0	(Georgia (country)) MarQuez Haynes	16	1	3
SG	30	(Italy) Bruno Cerella	7	0	0
SG	7	(Italy) Stefano Tonut	0	1	0
PF	9	(United States) Austin Daye	15	4	2
C	50	(United States) Mitchell Watt	8	3	2
Reserves:					
F	2	(Croatia) Hrvoje Perić	16	2	2
G	3	(United States) Dominique Johnson	0	3	1
G/F	6	(Greece) Michael Bramos	4	2	1
G	11	(United States) Michael Jenkins	3	1	0
F/C	14	(United States) Tomas Ress	DNP		
C	19	(Italy) Paul Biligha	4	5	0
Head coach:
(Italian Basketball Federation) Walter De Raffaele

Reyer	Scandone

Reyer	Statistics	Scandone
24/44 (54.5%)	2-pt field goals	23/41 (56.1%)
7/21 (33.3%)	3-pt field goals	5/20 (25%)
12/17 (70.6%)	Free throws	18/24 (75%)
7	Offensive rebounds	16
21	Defensive rebounds	30
28	Total rebounds	46
13	Assists	14
3	Turnovers	12
4	Steals	1
3	Blocks	2
23	Fouls	20

Starters:			Pts	Reb	Ast
PG	12	(Italy) Ariel Filloy	5	7	2
SG	9	(United States) Jason Rich	32	1	5
SF	1	(United States) Dez Wells	0	1	1
PF	10	(United States) Maarty Leunen	5	4	3
C	44	(Ukraine) Kyrylo Fesenko	21	15	2
Reserves:					
F/C	0	(Italy) Andrea Zerini	1	0	0
G	6	(Argentina) Bruno Fitipaldo	3	2	0
G/F	7	(Italy) Michele Fucci	DNP		
C	9	(Nigeria) Shane Lawal	2	8	1
F	11	(Canada) Thomas Scrubb	2	4	0
G	24	(Italy) Lorenzo D'Ercole	8	1	0
G	57	(Italy) Salvatore Parlato	DNP		
Head coach:
(Italian Basketball Federation) Stefano Sacripanti

- Team captains (C): (United States) Tomas Ress (Reyer Venezia) and (United States) Maarty Leunen (Sidigas Scandone)

== See also ==
- 2018 EuroLeague Final Four
- 2018 EuroCup Finals
- 2018 Basketball Champions League Final Four
