= Eurocup Basketball 2010–11 Regular Season Group G =

Standings and results for Group G of the regular season phase of the 2010–11 Eurocup basketball tournament.

== Standings ==
Key to colors
Top two places in each group advance to Last 16

	Team	Pld	W	L	PF	PA	Diff
1.	(Czech Republic) ČEZ Nymburk	6	4	2	496	473	+23
2.	(Spain) Cajasol	6	3	3	494	478	+16
3.	(Israel) Hapoel Jerusalem	6	3	3	466	463	+3
4.	(Latvia) VEF Rīga	6	2	4	472	514	−42

Source: Euroleague Basketball

== Fixtures and results ==
All times given below are in Central European Time.

=== Game 1 ===
16 November 2010
18:00

Report

Hapoel Jerusalem (Israel)	91–78	(Latvia) VEF Rīga
Scoring by quarter: 23–11, 26–22, 13–15, 29–29
Pts: Randle 22; Rebs: Randle 9 Asts: Rich 6		Pts: Janičenoks 23; Rebs: Parakhouski 4 Asts: Valters 5

Malha Arena
Attendance: 2,300
Referees: Guerrino Cerebuch (ITA), Peter Obradovic (BIH), Igor Dragojevic (MNE)

16 November 2010
19:00

Report

ČEZ Nymburk (Czech Republic)	77–93	(Spain) Cajasol
Scoring by quarter: 25–17, 13–19, 14–22, 25–35
Pts: Chan 29; Rebs: Nečas 6 Asts: Nissim, Nečas 5		Pts: Urtasun, Bullock, Davis 17; Rebs: Ivanov, Katelynas 6 Asts: three players 4

ČEZ Arena
Attendance: 4,100
Referees: Gianpaolo Cicoria (ITA), Tomas Jasevicius (LTU), Roman Kolar (SLO)

=== Game 2 ===
23 November 2010
18:30

Report

VEF Rīga (Latvia)	75–85	(Czech Republic) ČEZ Nymburk
Scoring by quarter: 20–14, 12–24, 25–25, 18–22
Pts: Janičenoks 23; Rebs: Bērziņš 14; Asts: Bertāns 4		Pts: Simmons 16; Rebs: Nečas 7 Asts: Nečas, Simmons 5

Arena Riga
Attendance: 2,200
Referees: Borys Ryzhyk (UKR), Lahdo Sharro (SWE), Tomas Trawicki (POL)

23 November 2010
20:45

Report

Cajasol (Spain)	72–76	(Israel) Hapoel Jerusalem
Scoring by quarter: 22–20, 12–20, 19–22, 19–14
Pts: Kirksay 19; Rebs: Katelynas 7 Asts: Satoransky, Ivanov 3		Pts: Solomon 26; Rebs: Randle 6 Asts: Rich 3

Palacio Municipal San Pablo
Attendance: 2,100
Referees: Luigi Lamonica (ITA), Luis Lopes (POR), Carmelo Lo Guzzo (ITA)

=== Game 3 ===
30 November 2010
18:00

Report

ČEZ Nymburk (Czech Republic)	73–67	(Israel) Hapoel Jerusalem
Scoring by quarter: 12–11, 19–23, 24–19, 18–14
Pts: Simmons 18; Rebs: Štimac 11; Asts: Lenzly 3		Pts: Rich 22; Rebs: Randle 6 Asts: Rich, Ohayon 6

ČEZ Arena
Attendance: 2,842
Referees: Antonio Conde (ESP), Sergiy Chebyshev (UKR), Admir Zurapovic (BIH)

30 November 2010
20:45

Report

Cajasol (Spain)	95–83	(Latvia) VEF Rīga
Scoring by quarter: 30–15, 24–22, 22–23, 19–23
Pts: Kirksay 17; Rebs: three players 6 Asts: three players 3		Pts: Williams 20; Rebs: Bērziņš 9 Asts: Williams, Gadson 4

Palacio Municipal San Pablo
Attendance: 1,600
Referees: Sreten Radovic (CRO), Enrico Sabetta (ITA), Radomir Vojinovic (MNE)

=== Game 4 ===
7 December 2010
18:30

Report

VEF Rīga (Latvia)	83–82	(Spain) Cajasol
Scoring by quarter: 21–23, 20–15, 23–22, 19–22
Pts: Janičenoks 32; Rebs: Bērziņš 8 Asts: Williams 5		Pts: Urtasun 17; Rebs: Urtasun, Kirksay 6 Asts: Satoranski, Katelynas 3

Arena Riga
Attendance: 1,200
Referees: Marek Cmikiewicz (POL), Apostolos Kalpakas (SWE), Dragan Neskovic (SRB)

7 December 2010
20:40

Report

Hapoel Jerusalem (Israel)	91–82	(Czech Republic) ČEZ Nymburk
Scoring by quarter: 21–14, 21–22, 25–18, 24–28
Pts: Solomon 26; Rebs: Clancy 9 Asts: Ohayon 4		Pts: Simmons 19; Rebs: Štimac 7 Asts: Nissim 3

Malha Arena
Attendance: 2,200
Referees: Juan Carlos Mitjana (ESP), Marko Juras (SRB), Rustu Nuran (TUR)

=== Game 5 ===
14 December 2010
18:30

Report

VEF Rīga (Latvia)	74–71	(Israel) Hapoel Jerusalem
Scoring by quarter: 23–23, 10–17, 27–14, 14–17
Pts: Bertāns 20; Rebs: Parakhouski 9 Asts: Gadson, Bertāns 4		Pts: Solomon 24; Rebs: Solomon 9 Asts: Randle 3

Arena Riga
Attendance: 1,800
Referees: Ilija Belosevic (SRB), Marcin Kowalski (POL), Ademir Zurapovic (BIH)

14 December 2010
20:30

Report

Cajasol (Spain)	68–89	(Czech Republic) ČEZ Nymburk
Scoring by quarter: 17–23, 16–26, 15–19, 20–21
Pts: Davis 13; Rebs: Davis 8 Asts: Popović 4		Pts: Simmons 20; Rebs: three players 7 Asts: Simmons 7

Palacio Municipal San Pablo
Attendance: 1,700
Referees: Oscar Lefwerth (SWE), Gianluca Mattioli (ITA), Jurgis Laurinavicius (LTU)

=== Game 6 ===
21 December 2010
19:45

Report

Hapoel Jerusalem (Israel)	70–84	(Spain) Cajasol
Scoring by quarter: 11–24, 26–19, 17–19, 16–22
Pts: Rich 17; Rebs: Clancy 9 Asts: Rich, Naimy 3		Pts: Kirksay 18; Rebs: Kirksay 8 Asts: Satoranski 6

Malha Arena
Attendance: 2,000
Referees: Andrej Lovsyn (SLO), Elias Koromilas (GRE), Sasa Maricic (SRB)

21 December 2010
19:45

Report

ČEZ Nymburk (Czech Republic)	90–79	(Latvia) VEF Rīga
Scoring by quarter: 22–26, 20–5, 25–24, 23–24
Pts: Pumprla 17; Rebs: Pumprla 7 Asts: Necas 6		Pts: Janičenoks 25; Rebs: Cain 11; Asts: three players 2

ČEZ Arena
Attendance: 3,128
Referees: Dubravko Muhvic (CRO), Marius Ciulin (ROM), Roman Kolar (SLO)
