= Derek Needham =

American basketball player

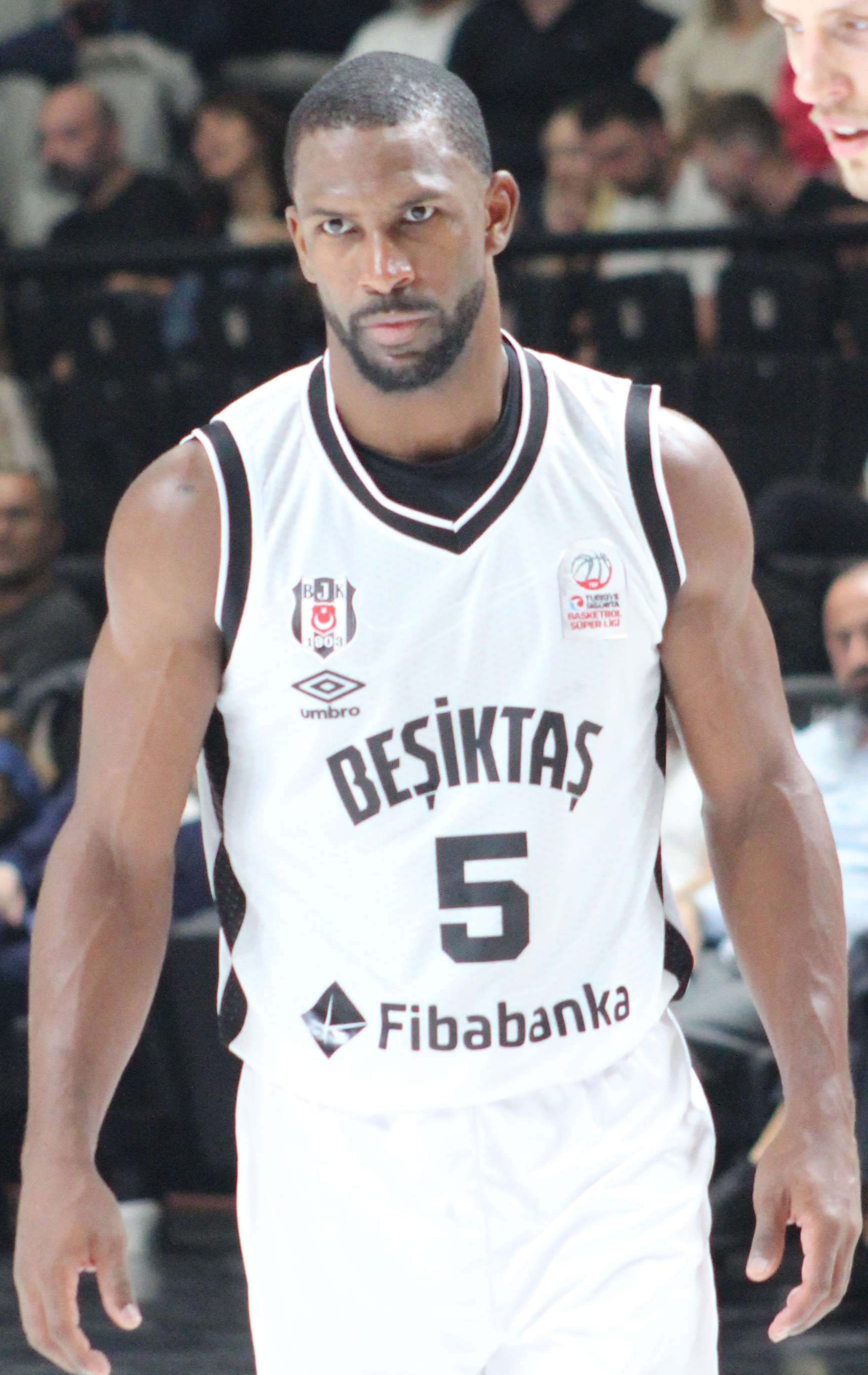

No. 15 – Chorale Roanne
- Position: Point guard
- League: LNB Élite

Personal information
- Born: October 20, 1990 (age 36) Dolton, Illinois, U.S.
- Listed height: 5 ft 11 in (1.80 m)
- Listed weight: 181 lb (82 kg)

Career information
- High school: De La Salle Institute (Chicago, Illinois)
- College: Fairfield (2010–2013)
- NBA draft: 2013: undrafted
- Playing career: 2013–present

Career history
- 2013–2014: Šiauliai
- 2014–2015: Khimik
- 2015–2016: Löwen Braunschweig
- 2016–2017: Reggiana
- 2017–2018: Mornar Bar
- 2018–2019: Monaco
- 2019: Rytas Vilnius
- 2019–2021: Mornar Bar
- 2021–2023: Frutti Extra Bursaspor
- 2023–2025: Beşiktaş
- 2025–2026: Girona
- 2026–present: Chorale Roanne

Career highlights
- All-EuroCup First Team (2022); Ukrainian Super League champion (2015); Ukrainian Super League MVP (2015); Montenegrin League champion (2018); Montenegrin League MVP (2018); First-team All-MAAC (2011); 3× Second-team All-MAAC (2010, 2012, 2013); MAAC Rookie of the Year (2010); All-Chicago Catholic League (2009)

Derek Ryan Needham (born October 20, 1990) is an American-born naturalized Montenegrin professional basketball player for Chorale Roanne of the LNB Élite. Standing at 5 ft 11 in (1.80 m), he plays the point guard position. Needham played college basketball for Fairfield University where he was named to the CollegeInsider.com Freshman All-America team in 2010 and was All-MAAC for four straight years between 2010 and 2013. Since 2017, Needham represents the senior Montenegrin national basketball team in international competitions.

== Playing career ==
=== High school ===
Needham is a native of Dolton, Illinois and attended the De La Salle Institute in Chicago, Illinois. During his senior season in 2009, Needham helped the Meteors basketball team reach the Class 4A sectional final while earning All-Chicago Catholic League and All-State second team honors. Needham also received the George Eastman Young Leaders Award and was named to the Chicago Catholic League All-Academic team.

=== College career ===
Needham played college basketball for Fairfield University in Fairfield, Connecticut from 2010 to 2013. During his freshman season with the Fairfield Stags, Needham earned MAAC Rookie of the Year after receiving a then league record 10 Rookie of the Week awards and setting Fairfield freshman records with 543 points and 172 assists. He was also named to the CollegeInsider.com Freshman All-America team. Needham is third on the all-time scoring list at Fairfield, with 1,875 points and 535 assists. He set a new record for three-pointers in a season, with 74 in his senior year. He earned All-MAAC honors during all four seasons, and earned spots on the NABC Division I All-District 1, All-Metropolitan Basketball Writers Association (MBWA) and All-Jesuit teams.

=== Professional career ===
During the 2013–2014 season, Needham played for BC Šiauliai in the Lithuanian Basketball League and Baltic Basketball League.

During the 2014–2015 season, Needham led BC Khimik to a perfect 36–0 season and the Ukrainian Basketball SuperLeague championship. He was named the most valuable player of the championship.

During the 2015–2016 season, Needham first played for Basketball Löwen Braunschweig in the Basketball Bundesliga and then joined Pallacanestro Reggiana in the Lega Basket Serie A. He helped lead Pallacanestro Reggiana to the Lega Basket Serie A championship game where he competed against his former Fairfield Stags teammate Rakim Sanders of Olimpia Milano.

On July 12, 2017, Needham signed with Montenegrin club Mornar.

Following the 2017–2018 season, EuroBasket.com named Needham to its FIBA All-Imports team after finishing 5th in scoring (17.2 ppg) and leading Mornar to the quarterfinals of 2017–18 FIBA Europe Cup Play-offs.

On June 30, 2021, he has signed with Frutti Extra Bursaspor of the Basketbol Süper Ligi.

On June 29, 2023, he signed with Beşiktaş of the Basketbol Süper Ligi.

On July 8, 2025, he signed with Bàsquet Girona of the Liga ACB.

On July 6, 2026, he signed with Chorale Roanne Basket of the LNB Pro A.

=== International career ===
Needham is a citizen of Montenegro and is a member of the Montenegro national team since 2017. He was part of the Montenegro team that qualified for the 2019 FIBA World Cup.
