= 2017–18 FIBA Europe Cup =

- Season: 2017–18
- Dates: 20 September – 11 October 2017 (qualifying); 18 October 2017 – 2 May 2018 (competition proper)
- Games played: 214
- Teams: 32+8 (competition proper); 30+30 (total)

Finals
- Champions: (Italy) Umana Reyer Venezia (1st title)
- Runners-up: (Italy) Sidigas Scandone
- Semi-finalists: (Netherlands) Donar (Denmark) Bakken Bears

Statistical leaders
Points	(United States) Mohamed Abukar	19.9
Rebounds	(United States) Jeff Adrien	8.6
Assists	(United States) Michael Thompson	5.6
Index Rating	(Serbia) Stevan Jelovac	19.6

Seasons
- ← 2016–17 2018–19 →

The 2017–18 FIBA Europe Cup was the third season of the FIBA Europe Cup, a European professional basketball competition for clubs that was launched by FIBA. The competition began on 20 September 2017, with the qualifying rounds, and concluded with the second leg of the final on 2 May 2018. Umana Reyer Venezia won its first European competition, after defeating Sidigas Scandone in the all-Italian Finals.

== Format changes ==
For the 2017–18 season, the FIBA Europe Cup was reduced to 32 teams in the regular season. This included eight groups of four teams divided into two conferences and the two top teams from each regular season group would advance to the second round of four groups of four teams followed by the two-legged play-offs. 19 out of 22 teams were dropped from Champions League qualifying rounds while 10 teams come (with additional 3 lucky losers team) from the qualifying rounds that were implemented.

=== Eligibility of players ===
FIBA agreed to adopt eligibility rules, forcing the clubs to have at least 5 home-grown players in rosters of 11 or 12 players, or at least four if the team has got less players.

== Team allocation ==
A total of 60 teams are expected to participate in the 2017–18 FIBA Europe Cup.

=== Teams ===
The labels in the parentheses show how each team qualified for the place of its starting round.

- 1st, 2nd, 3rd, 4th, 5th, etc.: League position after eventual Playoffs
- CL: Transferred from Champions League
  - RS: Fifth-placed and sixth-placed teams from regular season
  - QR: Losers from qualifying rounds

Play-offs
(Italy) Dinamo Sassari (CL RS)	(Latvia) Ventspils (CL RS)	(Spain) ~~Movistar Estudiantes~~ (CL RS)	(Italy) Sidigas Avellino (CL RS)
(Lithuania) Juventus (CL RS)	(France) ~~Élan Chalon~~ (CL RS)	(Italy) Umana Reyer Venezia (CL RS)	(Belgium) Oostende (CL RS)
Regular season
(Hungary) Alba Fehérvár (CL QR3)	(Belgium) Telenet Giants Antwerp (CL QR3)	(Estonia) ~~Kalev/Cramo~~ (CL QR2)	(Austria) ece Bulls Kapfenberg (CL QR1)
(Russia) Avtodor (CL QR3)	(Belarus) Tsmoki-Minsk (CL QR3)	(Montenegro) Mornar (CL QR2)	(North Macedonia) Karpoš Sokoli (CL QR1)
(Belgium) Basic-Fit Brussels (CL QR3)	(Denmark) Bakken Bears (CL QR2)	(Russia) Nizhny Novgorod (CL QR2)	(Cyprus) Keravnos (CL QR1)
(Netherlands) Donar (CL QR3)	(Portugal) Benfica (CL QR2)	(Romania) U-BT Cluj-Napoca (CL QR2)	(Sweden) ~~Luleå~~ (CL QR1)
(Finland) Kataja (CL QR3)	(Ukraine) ~~Budivelnyk~~ (CL QR2)	(Bosnia and Herzegovina) Bosna (CL QR1)	(Kosovo) Sigal Prishtina (CL QR1)
(Bulgaria) Lukoil Academic (CL QR3)	(Spain) ~~Divina Seguros Joventut~~ (CL QR2)	(Georgia (country)) Dinamo Tbilisi (CL QR1)	(Lithuania) ~~Vytautas~~ (CL QR1)
Second qualifying round
(Belgium) Proximus Spirou (4th)	(Estonia) Tartu Ülikool (3rd)	(Portugal) Porto (2nd)	(Ukraine) Khimik (2nd)
(Bulgaria) Beroe (2nd)	(France) ESSM Le Portel (8th)	(Romania) Steaua CSM EximBank (2nd)	
(Cyprus) Petrolina AEK Larnaca (2nd)	(Hungary) Falco Vulcano (2nd)	(Sweden) Södertälje Kings (2nd)	
First qualifying round
(Turkey) İstanbul BB (10th)	(Hungary) Egis Körmend (4th)	(Czech Republic) JIP Pardubice (3rd)	(North Macedonia) Rabotnički (3rd)
(Turkey) Trabzonspor Medical Park (12th)	(Hungary) Szolnoki Olaj (5th)	(Germany) s.Oliver Würzburg (14th)	(Poland) Stal Ostrów Wielkopolski (3rd)
(Turkey) Demir İnşaat Büyükçekmece (13th)	(Romania) Oradea (3rd)	(Iceland) KR (1st)	(Russia) Parma (13th)
(Bulgaria) Rilski Sportist (3rd)	(Romania) Sibiu (4th)	(Israel) Bnei Herzliya (7th)	(Sweden) Borås (5th)
(Bulgaria) Balkan (6th)	(Belgium) Belfius Mons-Hainaut (7th)	(Lithuania) Nevėžis (9th)	(Ukraine) Dnipro (3rd)

== Round and draw dates ==
The schedule of the competition is as follows (all draws are held at the FIBA headquarters in Munich, Germany, unless stated otherwise):

Phase	Round	Draw date	First leg	Second leg
Qualifying rounds	First qualifying round	3 August 2017	19–24 September 2017	26–28 September 2017
Qualifying rounds	Second qualifying round	3 August 2017	3–4 October 2017	10–11 October 2017
Regular season	Matchday 1	3 August 2017	17–18 October 2017	
Regular season	Matchday 2	3 August 2017	24–25 October 2017	
Regular season	Matchday 3	3 August 2017	31 October – 1 November 2017	
Regular season	Matchday 4	3 August 2017	7–8 November 2017	
Regular season	Matchday 5	3 August 2017	14–15 November 2017	
Regular season	Matchday 6	3 August 2017	5–6 December 2017	
Second round	Matchday 1	3 August 2017	19–20 December 2017	
Second round	Matchday 2	3 August 2017	9–10 January 2018	
Second round	Matchday 3	3 August 2017	16–17 January 2018	
Second round	Matchday 4	3 August 2017	23–24 January 2018	
Second round	Matchday 5	3 August 2017	30–31 January 2018	
Second round	Matchday 6	3 August 2017	6–7 February 2018	
Play-offs	Round of 16	8 February 2018	6–7 March 2018	13–14 March 2018
Play-offs	Quarter-finals	8 February 2018	20–21 March 2018	27–28 March 2018
Play-offs	Semi-finals	8 February 2018	11 April 2018	18 April 2018
Play-offs	Finals	8 February 2018	25 April 2018	2 May 2018

== Qualifying rounds ==
The draw for the qualifying rounds was held on 3 August 2017 at the FIBA headquarters in Munich, Germany.

In the qualifying rounds, teams are divided into seeded and unseeded teams based on their club coefficients, and then drawn into two-legged home-and-away ties. Teams from the same country cannot be drawn against each other.

=== First qualifying round ===
A total of 20 teams played in the first qualifying round. The first legs were played on 19–21 and 24 September, and the second legs were played on 26–28 September 2017.

Team 1	Agg.	Team 2	1st leg	2nd leg
Balkan (Bulgaria)	152–151	(Romania) Oradea	82–66	70–85
Szolnoki Olaj (Hungary)	176–175	(Turkey) Trabzonspor Medical Park	108–98	68–77
Demir İnşaat Büyükçekmece (Turkey)	171–156	(Ukraine) Dnipro	88–89	83–67
Borås (Sweden)	133–163	(Hungary) Egis Körmend	61–78	72–85
Sibiu (Romania)	142–156	(Czech Republic) JIP Pardubice	78–79	64–77
KR (Iceland)	138–172	(Belgium) Belfius Mons-Hainaut	67–88	71–84
Bnei Herzliya (Israel)	148–139	(Poland) Slam Stal Ostrów Wielkopolski	84–74	64–65
Nevėžis (Lithuania)	167–143	(Bulgaria) Rilski Sportist	76–81	91–62
Parma (Russia)	183–136	(North Macedonia) Rabotnički	88–63	95–73
s.Oliver Würzburg (Germany)	138–140	(Turkey) İstanbul BB	62–75	76–65

=== Second qualifying round ===
A total of 20 teams played in the second qualifying round: 10 teams which enter in this round, and the 10 winners of the first qualifying round. The first legs were played on 3 and 4 October, and the second legs were played on 10 and 11 October 2017.

Team 1	Agg.	Team 2	1st leg	2nd leg
Egis Körmend (Hungary)	164–147	(Romania) Steaua CSM EximBank	91–75	73–72
Bnei Herzliya (Israel)	150–151	(Portugal) Porto	65–68	85–83
Balkan (Bulgaria)	169–180	(Hungary) Falco Vulcano	95–96	74–84
Szolnoki Olaj (Hungary)	159–138	(Sweden) Södertälje Kings	86–63	73–75
İstanbul BB (Turkey)	165–158	(Ukraine) Khimik	89–90	76–68
Parma (Russia)	129–148	(France) ESSM Le Portel	74–74	55–74
Nevėžis (Lithuania)	156–145	(Cyprus) Petrolina AEK Larnaca	90–60	66–85
Belfius Mons-Hainaut (Belgium)	167–135	(Bulgaria) Beroe	88–69	79–66
Demir İnşaat Büyükçekmece (Turkey)	160–146	(Estonia) University of Tartu	87–78	73–68
JIP Pardubice (Czech Republic)	141–180	(Belgium) Proximus Spirou	75–92	66–88

=== Lucky losers table ===
Three teams would advance as lucky losers of the qualifying rounds, for replacing teams dropped from the Champions League that refused to join the competition. The three teams with the smallest point difference in the second qualifying round advanced to the regular season.

Pos	Team	Pld	W	D	L	PF	PA	PD	Qualification
1	(Israel) Bnei Herzliya	2	1	0	1	150	151	−1	Advance to regular season
2	(Ukraine) Khimik	2	1	0	1	158	165	−7	Advance to regular season
3	(Bulgaria) Balkan	2	0	0	2	169	180	−11	Advance to regular season
4	(Cyprus) Petrolina AEK Larnaca	2	1	0	1	145	156	−11	
5	(Estonia) Tartu Ülikool	2	0	0	2	146	160	−14	
6	(Romania) Steaua CSM EximBank	2	0	0	2	147	164	−17	
7	(Russia) Parma	2	0	1	1	129	148	−19	
8	(Sweden) Södertälje Kings	2	1	0	1	138	159	−21	
9	(Bulgaria) Beroe	2	0	0	2	135	167	−32	
10	(Czech Republic) JIP Pardubice	2	0	0	2	141	180	−39	

Source: FIBA Europe Cup
Rules for classification: 1) Least point difference; 2) Points for; 3) Points against.

== Regular season ==
Location of teams of the 2017–18 FIBA Europe Cup regular season.
Red: Group A; Yellow: Group B; Green: Group C; Dark Green: Group D; Purple: Group E. Pink: Group F; Blue: Group G; Orange: Group H.

The draw for the regular season was held on 3 August 2017 at the FIBA headquarters in Munich, Germany.

The 32 teams are drawn into eight groups of four, with the restriction that teams from the same country cannot be drawn against each other. In each group, teams play against each other home-and-away in a round-robin format. The group winners and runners-up advance to the second round, while the third-placed teams and fourth-placed teams are eliminated.

A total of 32 teams play in the regular season: the ten winners of the play-off round, the 19 of 24 losers of the 2017–18 Champions League qualifying rounds and the three lucky losers who replaced the defeated teams that used their opt-out clause.

FIBA has provided information on the situation of teams who signed a clause that allows them to withdraw from the FIBA Europe Cup if they are eliminated in the 2017–18 Basketball Champions League qualifying rounds. In other words, the following nine teams ended their continental adventure when they were eliminated from the main continental competition organized under the aegis of FIBA and therefore refuse to participate in the FIBA Europe Cup:

Opt-out clause teams

- (Estonia) ~~Kalev/Cramo~~
- (France) Nanterre 92
- (Germany) MHP Riesen Ludwigsburg
- (Lithuania) Juventus
- (Lithuania) ~~Vytautas~~
- (Spain) ~~Divina Seguros Joventut~~
- (Spain) Movistar Estudiantes
- (Sweden) ~~Luleå~~
- (Ukraine) ~~Budivelnyk~~
Notes:
- Strikethrough teams were eliminated from the Basketball Champions League qualifying rounds and refused to participate in the FIBA Europe Cup, So, additional 3 vacancies in the FIBA Europe Cup regular season were added.
- Teams marked in italics advanced to the Basketball Champions League regular season.

Depending on the number of teams mentioned above that were eliminated from the Basketball Champions League qualifying rounds and with the aim to complete the 32 places in the regular season, the number of the defeated teams in the second qualifying round of the FIBA Europe Cup that advanced to the regular season were determined by the point difference recorded at the end of their pairings. In their draw, the first qualifying round was used for tie-breaking. In the draw persists, the next criterion was the performance of clubs in the last three seasons at the European competitions.

Finally, the best three losing teams have qualified for the group stage:

Qualified lucky losers

- (Israel) Bnei Herzliya
- (Ukraine) Khimik
- (Bulgaria) Balkan

The three lucky losers were drawn into Groups D, F and G by FIBA Europe on 12 October in the House of Basketball in Mies, Switzerland.

The match-days were on 18 October, 25 October, 1 November, 8 November, 15 November and 6 December 2017.

=== Group A ===
Pos	Team	Pld	W	L	PF	PA	PD	Pts	Qualification	POR	DON	ANT	BOS
1	(France) ESSM Le Portel	6	5	1	486	392	+94	11	Advance to second round	—	60–49	94–79	101–51
2	(Netherlands) Donar	6	4	2	453	391	+62	10	Advance to second round	77–72	—	84–82	94–56
3	(Belgium) Telenet Giants Antwerp	6	3	3	484	489	−5	9		70–73	78–77	—	84–77
4	(Bosnia and Herzegovina) Bosna	6	0	6	377	528	−151	6		66–86	43–72	84–91	—

Source: FIBA Europe Cup
Legend: Blue = home team win; Red = away team win.

=== Group B ===
Pos	Team	Pld	W	L	PF	PA	PD	Pts	Qualification	NEV	BAK	AVT	BEN
1	(Lithuania) Nevėžis	6	4	2	508	464	+44	10	Advance to second round	—	71–86	84–83	94–68
2	(Denmark) Bakken Bears	6	4	2	523	493	+30	10	Advance to second round	64–90	—	97–85	95–76
3	(Russia) Avtodor	6	3	3	526	497	+29	9		75–86	76–73	—	110–71
4	(Portugal) Benfica	6	1	5	484	587	−103	7		88–83	95–108	86–97	—

Source: FIBA Europe Cup
Legend: Blue = home team win; Red = away team win.

=== Group C ===
Pos	Team	Pld	W	L	PF	PA	PD	Pts	Qualification	MOR	KAT	POR	KAP
1	(Montenegro) Mornar Bar	6	4	2	437	417	+20	10	Advance to second round	—	76–71	81–70	74–58
2	(Finland) Kataja	6	4	2	499	481	+18	10	Advance to second round	81–76	—	88–84	83–87
3	(Portugal) Porto	6	3	3	464	459	+5	9		68–55	86–90	—	85–84
4	(Austria) ece Bulls Kapfenberg	6	1	5	431	474	−43	7		69–75	72–86	61–71	—

Source: FIBA Europe Cup
Legend: Blue = home team win; Red = away team win.

=== Group D ===
Pos	Team	Pld	W	L	PF	PA	PD	Pts	Qualification	KER	KOR	BRU	BAL
1	(Cyprus) Keravnos	6	5	1	497	437	+60	11	Advance to second round	—	75–65	90–77	88–69
2	(Hungary) Egis Körmend	6	4	2	470	483	−13	10	Advance to second round	93–92	—	74–61	90–86
3	(Belgium) Basic-Fit Brussels	6	2	4	447	463	−16	8		58–68	86–64	—	81–78
4	(Bulgaria) Balkan	6	1	5	480	511	−31	7		75–84	83–84	89–84	—

Source: FIBA Europe Cup
Legend: Blue = home team win; Red = away team win.

=== Group E ===
Pos	Team	Pld	W	L	PF	PA	PD	Pts	Qualification	CLU	IBB	LUK	DIN
1	(Romania) U-BT Cluj-Napoca	6	5	1	527	451	+76	11	Advance to second round	—	90–69	83–70	97–74
2	(Turkey) İstanbul BB	6	5	1	491	439	+52	11	Advance to second round	92–82	—	81–69	72–52
3	(Bulgaria) Lukoil Academic	6	2	4	433	465	−32	8		73–88	76–80	—	73–70
4	(Georgia (country)) Dinamo Tbilisi	6	0	6	402	498	−96	6		73–87	70–97	63–72	—

Source: FIBA Europe Cup
Legend: Blue = home team win; Red = away team win.

=== Group F ===
Pos	Team	Pld	W	L	PF	PA	PD	Pts	Qualification	TSM	ALB	SPI	HER
1	(Belarus) Tsmoki-Minsk	6	4	2	461	439	+22	10	Advance to second round	—	87–82	76–78	83–65
2	(Hungary) Alba Fehérvár	6	3	3	456	436	+20	9	Advance to second round	73–64	—	60–72	74–93
3	(Belgium) Proximus Spirou	6	3	3	429	441	−12	9		78–82	52–74	—	66–62
4	(Israel) Bnei Herzliya	6	2	4	438	468	−30	8		63–69	68–93	87–83	—

Source: FIBA Europe Cup
Legend: Blue = home team win; Red = away team win.

=== Group G ===
Pos	Team	Pld	W	L	PF	PA	PD	Pts	Qualification	BUY	MON	SIG	KHI
1	(Turkey) Demir İnşaat Büyükçekmece	6	5	1	478	409	+69	11	Advance to second round	—	79–84	86–59	80–76
2	(Belgium) Belfius Mons-Hainaut	6	3	3	445	420	+25	9	Advance to second round	64–69	—	72–74	75–51
3	(Kosovo) Sigal Prishtina	6	3	3	422	441	−19	9		66–84	69–75	—	76–65
4	(Ukraine) Khimik	6	1	5	389	464	−75	7		60–80	78–75	59–78	—

Source: FIBA Europe Cup
Legend: Blue = home team win; Red = away team win.

=== Group H ===
Pos	Team	Pld	W	L	PF	PA	PD	Pts	Qualification	NIZ	SZO	FAL	KAR
1	(Russia) Nizhny Novgorod	6	5	1	523	475	+48	11	Advance to second round	—	78–70	94–92	95–70
2	(Hungary) Szolnoki Olaj	6	4	2	515	458	+57	10	Advance to second round	97–71	—	89–79	94–73
3	(Hungary) Falco Vulcano	6	3	3	546	471	+75	9		79–84	84–74	—	108–87
4	(North Macedonia) Karpoš Sokoli	6	0	6	413	593	−180	6		67–101	73–91	43–104	—

Source: FIBA Europe Cup
Legend: Blue = home team win; Red = away team win.

== Second round ==
In each group, teams play against each other home-and-away in a round-robin format. The group winners and runners-up advance to the round of 16, while the third-placed teams and fourth-placed teams are eliminated.

A total of 16 teams play in the second round: the eight group winners and the eight runners-up of the regular season. The match-days will be on 20 December 2017, 10 January, 17 January, 24 January, 31 January and 7 February 2018.

=== Group I ===
Pos	Team	Pld	W	L	PF	PA	PD	Pts	Qualification	POR	NIZ	IBB	KAT
1	(France) ESSM Le Portel	6	6	0	496	403	+93	12	Advance to round of 16	—	79–72	86–49	90–68
2	(Russia) Nizhny Novgorod	6	3	3	491	478	+13	9	Advance to round of 16	57–76	—	110–86	84–75
3	(Turkey) İstanbul BB	6	3	3	469	523	−54	9		80–83	82–79	—	85–83
4	(Finland) Kataja	6	0	6	465	517	−52	6		77–82	80–89	82–87	—

Source: FIBA Europe Cup
Legend: Blue = home team win; Red = away team win.

=== Group J ===
Pos	Team	Pld	W	L	PF	PA	PD	Pts	Qualification	ALB	KOR	NEV	BUY
1	(Hungary) Alba Fehérvár	6	5	1	500	462	+38	11	Advance to round of 16	—	88–68	88–80	74–72
2	(Hungary) Egis Körmend	6	3	3	461	483	−22	9	Advance to round of 16	77–85	—	85–79	73–71
3	(Lithuania) Nevėžis	6	2	4	495	501	−6	8		90–87	81–86	—	75–78
4	(Turkey) Demir İnşaat Büyükçekmece	6	2	4	452	462	−10	8		75–78	79–72	77–90	—

Source: FIBA Europe Cup
Legend: Blue = home team win; Red = away team win.

=== Group K ===
Pos	Team	Pld	W	L	PF	PA	PD	Pts	Qualification	BAK	TSM	MOR	SZO
1	(Denmark) Bakken Bears	6	4	2	509	536	−27	10	Advance to round of 16	—	75–96	93–92	100–96
2	(Belarus) Tsmoki-Minsk	6	3	3	472	429	+43	9	Advance to round of 16	85–86	—	84–45	86–61
3	(Montenegro) Mornar Bar	6	3	3	461	497	−36	9	Advance to round of 16	76–87	83–76	—	73–68
4	(Hungary) Szolnoki Olaj	6	2	4	484	464	+20	8		91–68	79–45	89–92	—

Source: FIBA Europe Cup
Legend: Blue = home team win; Red = away team win.

=== Group L ===
Pos	Team	Pld	W	L	PF	PA	PD	Pts	Qualification	DON	CLU	KER	BEL
1	(Netherlands) Donar	6	4	2	511	444	+67	10	Advance to round of 16	—	92–72	109–69	96–72
2	(Romania) U-BT Cluj-Napoca	6	3	3	455	468	−13	9	Advance to round of 16	73–77	—	77–71	77–80
3	(Cyprus) Keravnos	6	3	3	437	463	−26	9	Advance to round of 16	74–72	67–71	—	89–72
4	(Belgium) Belfius Mons-Hainaut	6	2	4	451	479	−28	8		84–65	81–85	62–67	—

Source: FIBA Europe Cup
Legend: Blue = home team win; Red = away team win.

=== Ranking of third-placed teams ===
Pos	Grp	Team	Pld	W	L	PF	PA	PD	Pts	Qualification
1	L	(Cyprus) Keravnos	6	3	3	437	463	−26	9	Advance to round of 16
2	K	(Montenegro) Mornar	6	3	3	461	497	−36	9	Advance to round of 16
3	I	(Turkey) İstanbul BB	6	3	3	469	523	−54	9	
4	J	(Lithuania) Nevėžis	6	2	4	495	501	−6	8	

Source: FIBA Europe Cup

== Play-offs ==
In the play-offs, teams play against each other over two legs on a home-and-away basis. The playoff round starts with 16 teams, where second round group winners and runners-up are joined by eight more teams transferring from the Basketball Champions League. The draw was made without any restriction. Movistar Estudiantes, Élan Chalon, AEK Athens and SIG Strasbourg, had opt-out clauses from playing in the FIBA Europe Cup and in the event of them claiming fifth or sixth place, their spot would be filled by the best-ranked third-placed teams from the second round.

=== Bracket ===
Round of 16
(Lithuania) Juventus	87	76	163
(Hungary) Alba Fehérvár	74	78	152
(Italy) Sidigas Scandone	70	81	151
(Belarus) Tsmoki-Minsk	70	72	142
(Latvia) Ventspils	73	81	154
(Denmark) Bakken Bears	93	75	168
(Italy) Dinamo Sassari	72	81	153
(France) ESSM Le Portel	55	100	155
(Italy) Reyer Venezia	83	86	169
(Hungary) Egis Körmend	51	88	139
(Cyprus) Keravnos	62	61	123
(Russia) Nizhny Novgorod	77	71	148
(Belgium) Oostende	84	63	147
(Montenegro) Mornar	71	90	161
(Netherlands) Donar	103	76	179
(Romania) U-BT Cluj-Napoca	76	69	145

Quarter-finals
(Lithuania) Juventus	77	68	145
(Italy) Sidigas Scandone	77	85	162
(Denmark) Bakken Bears	76	80	156
(France) ESSM Le Portel	62	86	148
(Italy) Reyer Venezia	86	90	176
(Russia) Nizhny Novgorod	76	94	170
(Montenegro) Mornar	73	74	147
(Netherlands) Donar	67	101	168

Semi-finals
(Italy) Sidigas Scandone	75	82	157
(Denmark) Bakken Bears	72	72	144
(Italy) Reyer Venezia	82	80	162
(Netherlands) Donar	72	83	155

Finals
(Italy) Sidigas Scandone	69	79	148
(Italy) Reyer Venezia	77	81	158

=== Round of 16 ===
The first legs were played on 6–7 March, and the second legs on 13–14 March 2018.

Team 1	Agg.	Team 2	1st leg	2nd leg
Keravnos (Cyprus)	123–148	(Russia) Nizhny Novgorod	62–77	61–71
Sidigas Scandone (Italy)	151–142	(Belarus) Tsmoki-Minsk	70–70	81–72
Dinamo Sassari (Italy)	153–155	(France) ESSM Le Portel	72–55	81–100
Oostende (Belgium)	147–161	(Montenegro) Mornar	84–71	63–90
Donar (Netherlands)	179–145	(Romania) U-BT Cluj-Napoca	103–76	76–69
Ventspils (Latvia)	154–168	(Denmark) Bakken Bears	73–93	81–75
Juventus (Lithuania)	163–152	(Hungary) Alba Fehérvár	87–74	76–78
Umana Reyer Venezia (Italy)	169–139	(Hungary) Egis Körmend	83–51	86–88

Notes

1. Order of legs reversed after original draw, requested by Donar due to the no availability of their home arena for the second leg.

=== Quarter-finals ===
The first legs were played on 20–21 March, and the second legs on 27–28 March 2018.

Team 1	Agg.	Team 2	1st leg	2nd leg
Umana Reyer Venezia (Italy)	176–170	(Russia) Nizhny Novgorod	86–76	90–94
Juventus (Lithuania)	145–162	(Italy) Sidigas Scandone	77–77	68–85
Bakken Bears (Denmark)	156–148	(France) ESSM Le Portel	76–62	80–86
Mornar (Montenegro)	147–168	(Netherlands) Donar	73–67	74–101

=== Semi-finals ===
The first legs will be played on 11 April, and the second legs will be played on 18 April 2018.

Team 1	Agg.	Team 2	1st leg	2nd leg
Umana Reyer Venezia (Italy)	162–155	(Netherlands) Donar	82–72	80–83
Sidigas Scandone (Italy)	157–144	(Denmark) Bakken Bears	75–72	82–72

=== Finals ===
The first leg will be played on 25 April, and the second leg will be played on 2 May 2018.

Team 1	Agg.	Team 2	1st leg	2nd leg
Sidigas Scandone (Italy)	148–158	(Italy) Umana Reyer Venezia	69–77	79–81

== Individual honours ==
=== Top Performer ===
After each gameday a selection of five players with the highest efficiency ratings is made by the FIBA Europe Cup. Afterwards, the official website decides which player is crowned Top Performer of the round.

Regular season

Round	Player	Team	EFF	Ref.
1	(United States) Jeff Adrien	(Israel) Bnei Herzliya	38	
2	(United States) Seth Tuttle	(Belgium) Proximus Spirou	29	
3	(United States) Darrin Govens	(Hungary) Falco Vulcano	45	
4	(United States) Kendrick Perry	(Hungary) Szolnoki Olaj	28	
5	(United States) Evan Bruinsma	(Netherlands) Donar	40	
6	(Hungary) Krisztofer Durázi	(Hungary) Falco Vulcano	35	

Second round

Round	Player	Team	EFF	Ref.
1	(United States) Jeffrey Crockett	(Denmark) Bakken Bears	27	
2	(Netherlands) Thomas Koenis	(Netherlands) Donar	36	
3	(Hungary) Péter Lóránt	(Hungary) Alba Fehérvár	38	
4	(United States) Evan Bruinsma (2)	(Netherlands) Donar	31	
5	(Russia) Ivan Strebkov	(Russia) Nizhny Novgorod	32	
6	(Serbia) Strahinja Milošević	(Hungary) Szolnoki Olaj	28	

Round of 16

Leg	Player	Team	EFF	Ref.
1	(United States) Brandyn Curry	(Netherlands) Donar	33	
2	(United States) Frank Hassell	(France) ESSM Le Portel	37	

Quarterfinals

Leg	Player	Team	EFF	Ref.
1	(Croatia) Hrvoje Perić	(Italy) Umana Reyer Venezia	27	
2	(Serbia) Stevan Jelovac	(Russia) Nizhny Novgorod	45	

Semifinals

Leg	Player	Team	EFF	Ref.
1	(United States) Jason Rich	(Italy) Sidigas Scandone	30	
2	(United States) Evan Bruinsma (3)	(Netherlands) Donar	23	

== See also ==
- 2017–18 EuroLeague
- 2017–18 EuroCup Basketball
- 2017–18 Basketball Champions League
