= 2016–17 Cyprus Basketball Division A =

Cyprus Basketball Division A
- Season: 2016–17
- Duration: 29 October 2016 – 5 May 2017
- Teams: 6

Regular season
- Top seed: Keravnos

Finals
- Champions: Keravnos (6th title)
- Runners-up: AEK Larnaca

Statistical leaders
Points	(United States) Baden Jaxen	21.9
Rebounds	(United States) Terell Parks	8.5
Assists	(United States) Kenny Barker	6.0

The 2016–17 Cyprus Basketball Division A was the 50th season of the Cyprus Basketball Division A, the top-tier level men's professional basketball league on Cyprus. The season started on 29 October 2016, and ended in May 2017. AEK Larnaca was the defending champion, and lost the title to Keravnos in the finals.

== Competition format ==
After the exclusion of Omonia, and the relegation of Anagennisi, only six teams would join the regular season.

== Regular season ==
=== League table ===
Pos	Team	Pld	W	L	PF	PA	PD	Pts	Qualification
1	Keravnos	20	18	2	1563	1267	+296	38	Qualification to playoffs
2	Petrolina AEK	20	16	4	1569	1301	+268	36	Qualification to playoffs
3	APOEL	20	11	9	1488	1411	+77	31	Qualification to playoffs
4	Enosis Neon Paralimni	20	8	12	1348	1397	−49	28	Qualification to playoffs
5	ETHA Engomis	20	4	16	1459	1622	−163	24	
6	Apollon Limassol	20	3	17	1228	1657	−429	23	

Source: Mismarcadores.com

=== Results ===
==== First round ====
Home \ Away	AEK	APOE	APOL	ENP	ETH	KER
AEK Larnaca		77–66	96–44	72–62	81–69	63–79
APOEL	89–77		90–66	68–61	59–50	59–86
Apollon Limassol	55–60	70–66		67–63	78–65	70–72
Enosis Neon Paralimni	47–65	82–76	98–77		78–69	43–75
ETHA Engomis	91–95	62–71	86–61	92–83		76–78
Keravnos	78–70	72–65	73–70	55–56	94–63	

Updated to match(es) played on unknown. Source: Cyprus Basketball Federation
Legend: Blue = home team win; Red = away team win.

==== Second round ====
Home \ Away	AEK	APOE	APOL	ENP	ETH	KER
AEK Larnaca		78–67	88–57	68–57	110–58	69–49
APOEL	69–73		106–56	78–73	73–69	64–70
Apollon Limassol	44–98	71–88		46–78	83–96	44–78
Enosis Neon Paralimni	54–69	60–79	70–55		79–59	62–76
ETHA Engomis	75–89	80–86	90–71	65–75		77–86
Keravnos	91–71	78–69	96–42	85–67	92–67	

Updated to match(es) played on unknown. Source: Cyprus Basketball Federation
Legend: Blue = home team win; Red = away team win.

== Playoffs ==
=== Bracket ===
Semifinals
1	Keravnos	3
4	Enosis Neon Paralimni	0
2	AEK Larnaca	3
3	APOEL	1

Finals
1	Keravnos	3
2	AEK Larnaca	1

=== Semi-finals ===
Team 1	Agg.	Team 2	Game 1	Game 2	Game 3	Game 4
Keravnos	3–0	Enosis Neon Paralimni	96–65	96–76	107–47	
AEK Larnaca	3–1	APOEL	64–60	72–75	87–79	73–64

==== Game 1 ====
5 April 2017	Keravnos	96–65 (Series: 1–0)	Enosis Neon Paralimni	Nicosia
17:00 (EEST)	Scoring by quarter: 31–19, 9–17, 25–16, 31–13
	Pts: Stylianou 19; Rebs: Parks 12; Asts: Ross 5	Report	Pts: Pearson 17; Rebs: Pearson, Pirillis 9 Asts: Washington 4	Arena: Costas Papaellinas

4 April 2017	AEK Larnaca	64–60 (Series: 1–0)	APOEL	Larnaca
19:00 (EEST)	Scoring by quarter: 16–7, 22–18, 12–17, 14–18
	Pts: Brezec 27; Rebs: Thomas 10; Asts: Anderson 7	Report	Pts: Bussey 16; Rebs: Bussey 6 Asts: Burnatowski 2	Arena: Kition Athletic Center

==== Game 2 ====
8 April 2017	Enosis Neon Paralimni	76–96 (Series: 0–2)	Keravnos	Avgorou
19:30 (EEST)	Scoring by quarter: 14–29, 23–25, 23–27, 16–15
	Pts: Washington 23; Rebs: Pearson 12; Asts: Washington 6	Report	Pts: Ross 20; Rebs: O'Brien 9 Asts: Barker 6	Arena: Avgorou Technical School

7 April 2017	APOEL	75–72 (Series: 1–1)	AEK Larnaca	Nicosia
19:00 (EEST)	Scoring by quarter: 19–17, 23–15, 9–17, 24–23
	Pts: Brown 21; Rebs: Burnatowski, Kounas 6 Asts: Bussey 5	Report	Pts: Brezec 24; Rebs: Dašić 13; Asts: Thomas 6	Arena: Lefkotheo

==== Game 3 ====
12 April 2017	Keravnos	107–47 (Series: 3–0)	Enosis Neon Paralimni	Nicosia
17:00 (EEST)	Scoring by quarter: 26–9, 31–12, 26–18, 24–8
	Pts: O'Brien, Parks 15; Rebs: Parks 9 Asts: Stylianou, Ross 5	Report	Pts: Ray 19; Rebs: Pearson 11; Asts: Thoma 3	Arena: Costas Papaellinas

11 April 2017	AEK Larnaca	87–79(OT) (Series: 2–1)	APOEL	Larnaca
19:00 (EEST)	Scoring by quarter: 18–19, 11–16, 22–15, 21–22, Overtime: 13–7
	Pts: Brezec 24; Rebs: Dašić 13; Asts: Dašić 5	Report	Pts: Mobley 19; Rebs: Mobley, Burnatowski 7 Asts: Kounas 5	Arena: Kition Athletic Center

==== Game 4 ====
18 April 2017	APOEL	64–73 (Series: 1–3)	AEK Larnaca	Nicosia
19:00 (EEST)	Scoring by quarter: 26–15, 16–24, 17–17, 5–17
	Pts: Brown 16; Rebs: Mobley 7 Asts: Burnatowski 4	Report	Pts: Brezec 17; Rebs: Thomas 13; Asts: Thomas 7	Arena: Lefkotheo

=== Finals ===
Team 1	Agg.	Team 2	Game 1	Game 2	Game 3	Game 4	Game 5
Keravnos	3–1	AEK Larnaca	80–79	71–90	82–72	55–54	
