= Tre Bussey =

American basketball player (born 1991)

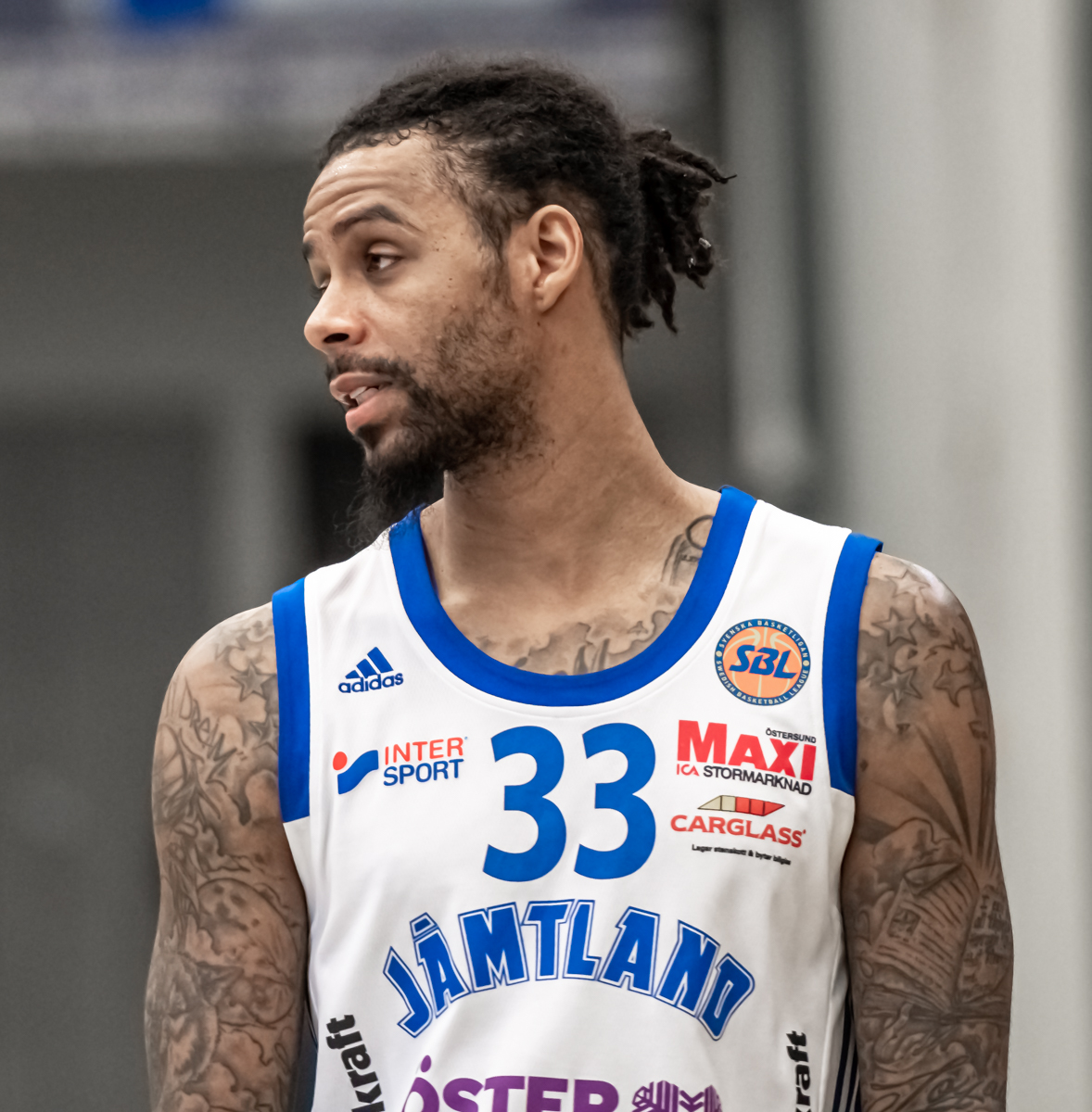
- Bussey playing with Jämtland in 2021

Personal information
- Born: November 13, 1991 (age 35) Atlanta, Georgia, U.S.
- Listed height: 6 ft 3 in (1.91 m)
- Listed weight: 170 lb (77 kg)

Career information
- High school: Lithia Springs (Lithia Springs, Georgia)
- College: Georgia Southern (2010–2014)
- NBA draft: 2014: undrafted
- Playing career: 2014–2021
- Position: Shooting guard

Career history
- 2014–2015: Idaho Stampede
- 2015–2016: Bashkimi Prizren
- 2016–2017: APOEL
- 2017: Keravnos
- 2017–2018: Eisbären Bremerhaven
- 2018–2019: Polpharma Starogard Gdański
- 2019–2020: Al-Gharafa
- 2020: AEK Larnaca
- 2020: Anwil Włocławek
- 2020–2021: Wilki Morskie Szczecin
- 2021: Jämtland Basket
- 2021: Goga Basket

Career highlights
- Third-team All-SoCon (2014)
- Stats at Basketball Reference

Theron Bussey (born November 13, 1991) is an American former professional basketball player. He played college basketball for Georgia Southern University where he was named a third-team All-Southern Conference honoree.

== High school career ==
Bussey attended Lithia Springs High School in Lithia Springs, Georgia where he was team captain his final two seasons. As a junior in 2008–09, he averaged 19.6 points, 6.2 assists and 5.3 rebounds per game. As a senior in 2009–10, he averaged 26.0 points, 4.2 assists and 3.7 rebounds per game as he earned All-State honors from All-Metro Sports and was named to the Region 5-AAAA squad.

== College career ==
As a freshman at Georgia Southern in 2010–11, Bussey played in 30 games with 10 starts as he averaged 6.8 points per game on the year with 205 total points. He reached double-figure scoring in seven games with a season-high 21 points against College of Charleston on December 4, 2010.

As a sophomore in 2011–12, Bussey played in 30 games with one start as he averaged 5.4 points and 1.5 rebounds per game. He scored in double-figures on seven occasions including the SoCon Tournament win over Chattanooga on March 2, 2012, with 10 points.

As a junior in 2012–13, Bussey played all 33 games with 27 starts as he averaged 8.8 points, 3.4 rebounds, and 1.2 assists per game. He reached double-figure scoring in 17 games and posted a season-best 17 points twice against Georgia State and UAB.

As a senior in 2013–14, Bussey played in 34 games with 33 starts as he averaged 16.2 points, 3.8 rebounds, 1.9 assists and 1.0 steals per game, and earned third-team All-Southern Conference honors.

== Professional career ==
Bussey went undrafted in the 2014 NBA draft, but on November 1, 2014, he was selected by the Idaho Stampede with the seventh overall pick in the 2014 NBA Development League Draft. On November 21, in just his third game for the Stampede, he scored a season-high 18 points against the Los Angeles D-Fenders.

On September 11, 2015, Bussey signed with Bashkimi Prizren of the ETC Superliga.

On September 26, 2016, Bussey signed a one-year contract with Cypriot First Division side APOEL. He spent the 2017–18 season with Eisbären Bremerhaven of the Basketball Bundesliga, averaging 5.2 points, 1.4 rebounds and 1.4 assists per game. On August 7, 2018, Bussey signed with SKS Starogard Gdański of the Polish league.

On July 4, 2020, he signed with Anwil Włocławek of the Polish Basketball League (PLK). After four games in which he averaged 3.3 points, 1.5 assists and 1.0 steal per game, Bussey left the team on October 13.

On October 16, 2020, he signed with Wilki Morskie Szczecin of the PLK.

In December 2020, Bussey joined Jämtland Basket of the Swedish Basketball League.
