= Tomas Ress =

Italian basketball player

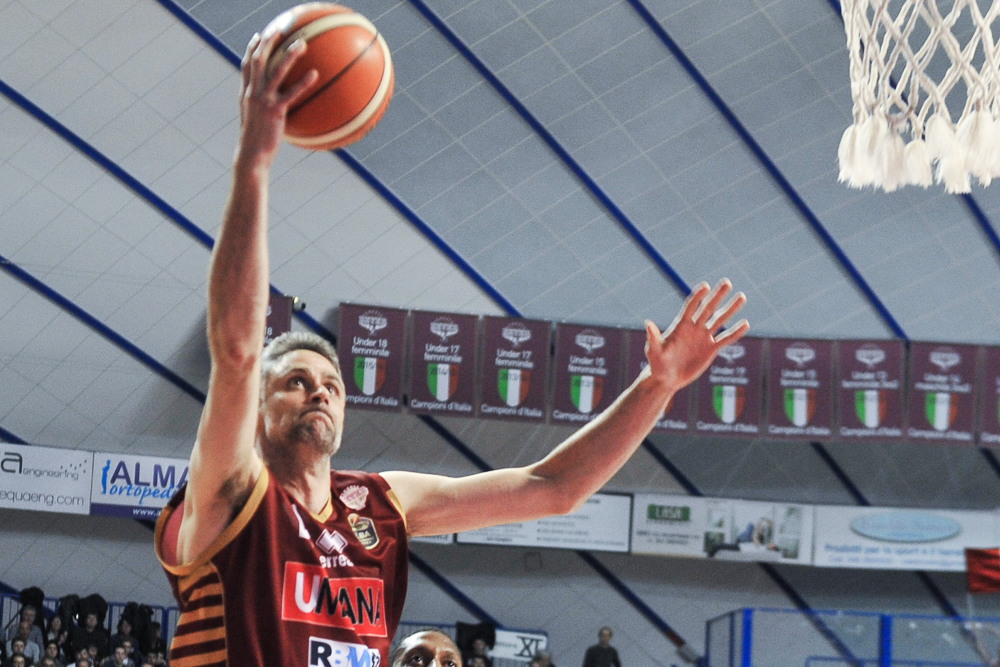
- Ress with Venezia in 2017

Free agent
- Position: Center

Personal information
- Born: 22 August 1980 (age 46) Salorno, Italy
- Listed height: 2.11 m (6 ft 11 in)
- Listed weight: 111 kg (245 lb)

Career information
- High school: Champagnat Catholic School (Hialeah, Florida)
- College: Texas A&M (1999–2003)
- NBA draft: 2003: undrafted
- Playing career: 1997–present

Career history
- 1997–1998: Virtus Bologna
- 2003–2005: Victoria Libertas Pesaro
- 2005–2006: Fortitudo Bologna
- 2006–2007: Reggiana
- 2007–2014: Montepaschi Siena
- 2014–2018: Reyer Venezia

Career highlights
- FIBA Europe Cup champion (2018); 8× Italian League champion (1998, 2008–2013, 2017); 5× Italian Cup winner (2009–2013); 7× Italian Supercup winner (2005, 2007–2011, 2013)
Medals
Men's basketball
Representing Italy
Mediterranean Games
Gold medal – first place	2005 Almería	National Team

Tomas Ress (born 22 August 1980) is an Italian professional basketball player who last played for Reyer Venezia of the Lega Basket Serie A (LBA). Standing at 2.11 m (6 ft 11 in), he plays at the center position.

== Amateur career ==
Ress played high school basketball at Champagnat Catholic School in Hialeah, Florida. He then played college basketball at Texas A&M University with the Texas A&M Aggies.

== Professional career ==
Ress began his pro career with Virtus Bologna during the 1997-98 season. He then moved to Victoria Libertas Pesaro, before joining Fortitudo Bologna. He then moved to Pallacanestro Reggio Emilia, before moving to Montepaschi Siena.

In July 2014, he signed with Reyer Venezia Mestre. On 2 May 2018 Ress won his second European cup after winning the FIBA Europe Cup with Reyer. On 26 July 2018 Ress officially parted ways with Venezia.

== Italian national team ==
Rees played with the Italian national basketball team at the 2005 Mediterranean Games, where he won the gold medal.

== Personal ==
Ress' sister is former WNBA player Kathrin Ress.
