= Radoje Vujošević =

Montenegrin basketball player

Radoje Vujoševic
Sutjeska
- Position: Center
- League: Montenegrin Basketball League

Personal information
- Born: May 5, 1989 (age 37) Nikšić, SR Montenegro, SFR Yugoslavia
- Listed height: 6 ft 10 in (2.08 m)
- Listed weight: 234 lb (106 kg)

Career information
- NBA draft: 2011: undrafted
- Playing career: 2011–present

Career history
- 2011–2012: Mornar Bar
- 2012–2014: Sutjeska
- 2014: Budućnost
- 2014: Kumanovo
- 2015–2021: Mornar Bar
- 2021–present: Sutjeska

Career highlights
- 2× Montenegrin League champion (2014, 2018); 2× Montenegrin Cup (2013, 2014)
Medals
Representing Montenegro
Men's basketball
Games of the Small States of Europe
Gold medal – first place	2015 Reykjavík	National Team

Radoje Vujoševic (born May 5, 1989) is a Montenegrin professional basketball player for Sutjeska of the Montenegrin Basketball League.
