= Stevan Jelovac =

Serbian basketball player (1989–2021)

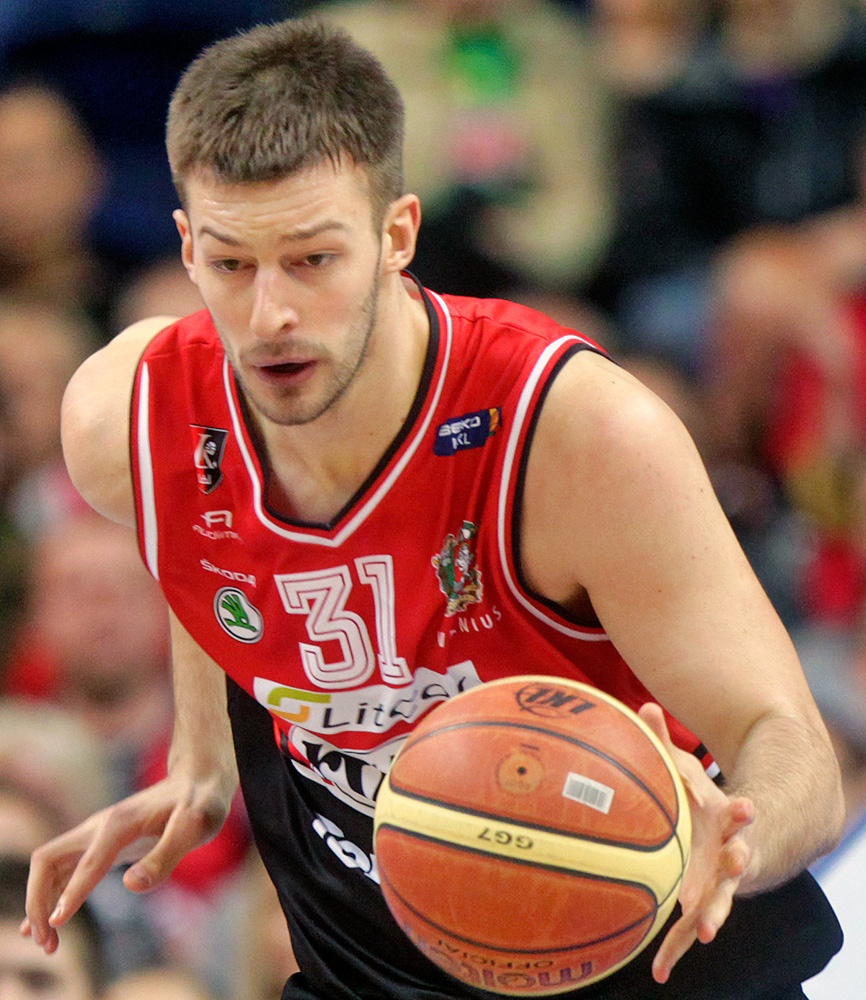
- Jelovac with Lietuvos rytas in 2014

Personal information
- Born: 8 July 1989; Novi Sad, SR Serbia, SFR Yugoslavia
- Died: 5 December 2021 (aged 32); Novi Sad, Serbia
- Listed height: 2.08 m (6 ft 10 in)
- Listed weight: 110 kg (243 lb)

Career information
- NBA draft: 2011: undrafted
- Playing career: 2008–2021
- Position: Power forward / Center
- Number: 8, 13, 31, 89

Career history
- 2008–2009: Vizura
- 2009–2010: Mega Vizura
- 2010: Crvena zvezda
- 2010–2011: Mega Vizura
- 2011–2012: Antalya BB
- 2012–2013: JuveCaserta
- 2013–2014: Lietuvos rytas
- 2014–2017: CAI Zaragoza
- 2017–2018: Nizhny Novgorod
- 2018–2019: Brose Bamberg
- 2019–2020: Gaziantep
- 2020–2021: San-en NeoPhoenix
- 2021: AEK Athens

Career highlights
- FIBA Europe Cup Top Scorer (2018); All-VTB United League Second Team (2018); Turkish League All-Star (2012); No. 13 retired by AEK Athens

Stevan Jelovac (Serbian: Стеван Јеловац; 8 July 1989 – 5 December 2021) was a Serbian professional basketball player.

== Professional career ==
Jelovac started his senior career with Vizura. On 25 August 2009, he signed with Mega Vizura. On 7 April 2010, he left Mega and signed with Crvena zvezda for the rest of the season. On 19 July 2010, he re-signed with Zvezda. On 16 November 2010, he parted ways with Zvezda and returned to Mega for the rest of the 2010–11 season.

On 15 June 2011, Jelovac signed with Antalya BŞB for the 2011–12 season.

On 10 July 2012, Jelovac signed a two-year deal with JuveCaserta. After one season, he parted ways with Caserta.

On 31 July 2013, Jelovac signed with Lietuvos rytas for the 2013–14 season.

On 4 July 2014, Jelovac signed a one-year deal with Spanish club CAI Zaragoza. On 13 June 2015, he re-signed with Zaragoza for one more season. In July 2016, he joined the Dallas Mavericks for the 2016 NBA Summer League. On 27 July 2016, he re-signed with Zaragoza for the 2016–17 season.

On 13 July 2017, Jelovac signed with Russian club Nizhny Novgorod for the 2017–18 season.

On 8 July 2018, Jelovac signed with the German club Brose Bamberg.

On 8 February 2019, Jelovac signed with the Turkish club Gaziantep Basketbol.

On 8 June 2020, he signed with San-en NeoPhoenix of the Japanese B.League.

On 23 August 2021, Jelovac signed with AEK Athens of the Greek Basket League and the Basketball Champions League. On 14 November 2021, during a practice session, he suffered a brain hemorrhage.

In Jelovac's honor, AEK Athens retired his #13 jersey on 14 December 2021.

== Death and funeral ==
Jelovac died in Novi Sad on 5 December 2021 from complications due to a brain hemorrhage, at the age of 32. He was buried at the Novi Sad City Cemetery two days later. After the Holy Liturgy, speech wes given by Aleksandar Jovančević. Funeral service was also attended by numerous sportspeople of Serbia and Greece including Predrag Danilović, Zlatko Bolić, Milenko Tepić, Mlađan Šilobad, Veselin Petrović, Vasa Mijić, and Đorđe Đurić.

== Career statistics ==
Legend
GP	Games played	GS	Games started	MPG	Minutes per game
FG%	Field-goal percentage	3P%	3-point field-goal percentage	FT%	Free-throw percentage
RPG	Rebounds per game	APG	Assists per game	SPG	Steals per game
BPG	Blocks per game	PPG	Points per game	PIR	Performance index rating
**Bold**	Career high

=== EuroLeague ===
Year	Team	GP	GS	MPG	FG%	3P%	FT%	RPG	APG	SPG	BPG	PPG	PIR
2013–14	Lietuvos rytas	10	0	13.6	.414	.192	.615	2.3	.3	.6	.1	6.1	4.0
Career		10	0	13.6	.414	.192	.615	2.3	.3	.6	.1	6.1	4.0

== See also ==
- List of basketball players who died during their careers
