= Terell Parks =

American basketball player (born 1991)

Free agent
- Position: Center / power forward
- League: VTB United League

Personal information
- Born: February 25, 1991 (age 35) Chicago, Illinois, U.S.
- Listed height: 6 ft 9 in (2.06 m)
- Listed weight: 250 lb (113 kg)

Career information
- High school: Beloit Memorial (Beloit, Wisconsin)
- College: Iowa Central CC (2009–2011); Western Illinois (2011–2013)
- NBA draft: 2013: undrafted
- Playing career: 2013–present

Career history
- 2013–2014: Kotwica Kołobrzeg
- 2015: Anagennisi Germasogeias
- 2016: Šentjur
- 2016–2018: Keravnos
- 2018–2019: Promitheas Patras
- 2019–2020: Larisa
- 2020: Nizhny Novgorod
- 2020: Cholet Basket
- 2020–2021: Bnei Herzliya
- 2021–2022: Fos Provence Basket
- 2022–2023: Ionikos Nikaias

Career highlights
- Cypriot League champion (2017); 2× Cypriot League Top Rebounder (2017, 2018); Summit League Defensive Player of the Year (2013); First-team All-Summit League (2013)

Terell Allen Parks Sr. (born February 25, 1991) is an American professional basketball player. He is a 6-foot-9-inch (2.06 m) center. After two years at Iowa Central Community College and two years at Western Illinois, Parks entered the 2013 NBA draft, but he was not selected in the draft's two rounds.

== High school career ==
Parks attended Beloit Memorial High School, in Beloit, Wisconsin, where he played high school basketball. He was ranked as the 25th best power forward in the nation by 247Sports.com.

== College career ==
Parks played college basketball at Iowa Central Community College, from 2009 to 2011, and at Western Illinois, from 2011 to 2013. As a senior, he averaged 12.6 points, 9.6 rebounds, and 2.5 blocks per game.

== Professional career ==
After failing to be drafted in the 2013 NBA draft, Parks signed with Kolossos Rodou of the Greek Basket League, but he left the team without playing with them in a single game. He later joined Kotwica Kołobrzeg, of the Polish Basketball League (PLK). He went on to average 11.8 points, 8.2 rebounds and 1.1 blocks per game in the Polish League.

In 2016, he joined Anagennisi Germasogeias of the Cypriot League. On February 28, 2016, he signed with Šentjur of the Premier A Slovenian League. He then returned to Cyprus, and joined Keravnos. He stayed with the club for two years, and with them he won the Cypriot League championship in 2017, and also led the league in rebounds in both seasons. He was also voted as the FIBA Europe Cup's Best Defender in 2018.

On August 4, 2018, he joined Promitheas Patras of the Greek Basket League. His contract with the club was about to be terminated after their game FIBA Champions League against Beşiktaş, but after the injury of the team's other main center Octavius Ellis, Parks remained with the team. His performance with Promitheas improved, and after their game FIBA Champions League game against Neptūnas, in which Parks had 18 points, 8 rebounds, and 1 block, Promitheas decided to keep him on their squad.

On August 26, 2019, Parks signed with the newly promoted Larisa, and thus remained in the Greek Basket League. He averaged 11.8 points, 8.3 rebounds and 1.2 steals per game. On January 11, 2020, his contract was officially bought out by Russian BCL club Nizhny Novgorod and Parks moved to the VTB United League. He averaged 10 points and 7 rebounds per game before the season was suspended. Parks was released by the team on July 10.

On July 20, 2020, he signed with Cholet Basket of the LNB Pro A. Parks averaged 8.5 points and 5.8 rebounds per game in four games. He parted ways with the team on November 18.

On November 22, 2020, he signed with Bnei Herzliya of the Israeli Basketball Premier League. Parks averaged 12.5 points, 8.2 rebounds, 1.4 assists and 1.5 steals per game. On September 10, 2021, he signed with Fos Provence Basket of the LNB Pro A.

On November 15, 2022, Parks returned to Greece for Ionikos Nikaias. In February 2023, Parks returned to Nizhny Novgorod.
