= Kyrylo Fesenko =

Ukrainian professional basketball player

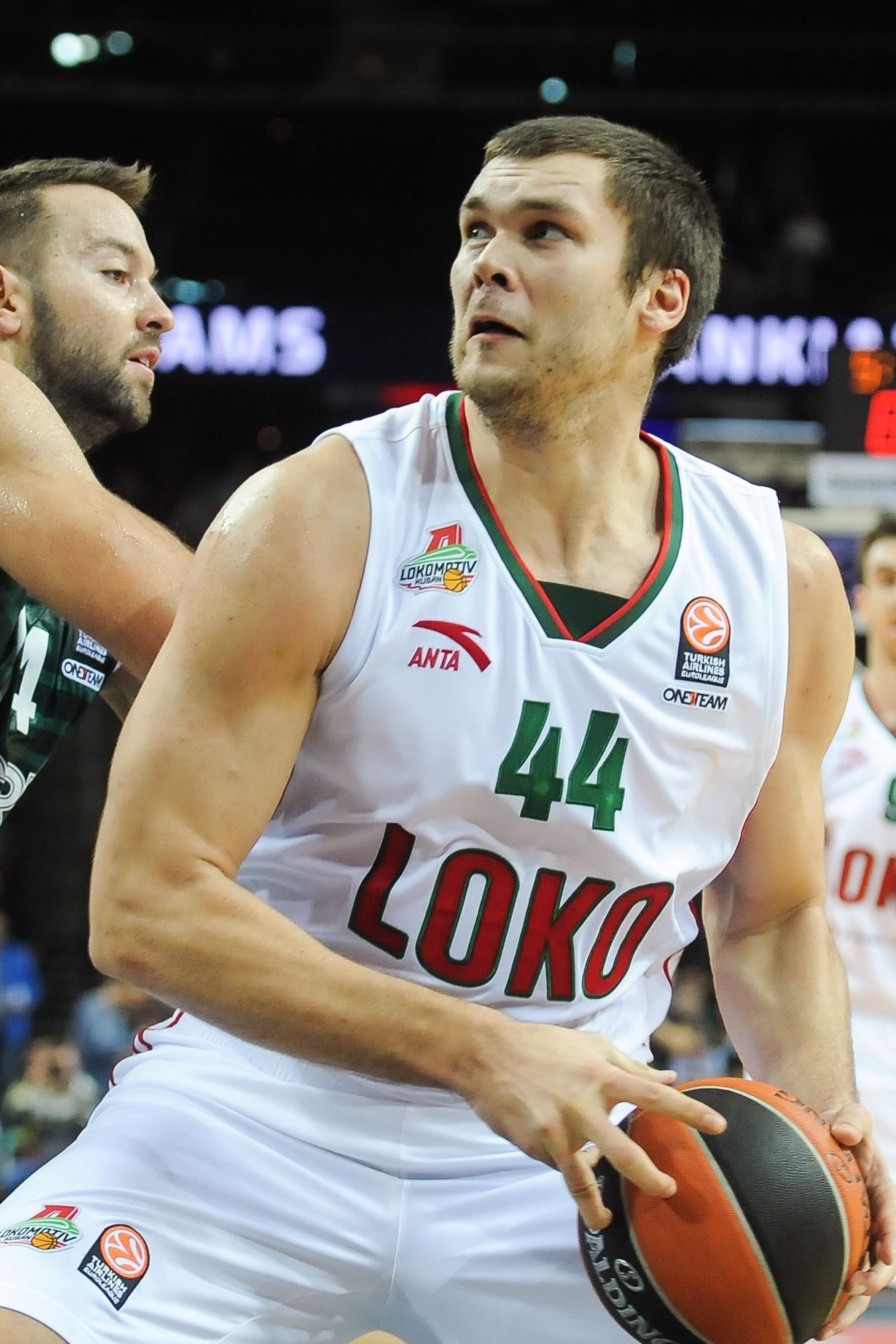
- Fesenko with Lokomotiv Kuban in 2015

Personal information
- Born: 24 December 1986 (age 39) Dnipropetrovsk, Ukrainian SSR, Soviet Union
- Listed height: 2.16 m (7 ft 1 in)
- Listed weight: 137 kg (302 lb)

Career information
- NBA draft: 2007: 2nd round, 38th overall pick
- Drafted by: Philadelphia 76ers
- Playing career: 2003–2023
- Position: Center

Career history
- 2003–2006: Azovmash Mariupol
- 2006–2007: Cherkaski Mavpy
- 2007–2011: Utah Jazz
- 2007–2009: →Utah Flash
- 2012: Indiana Pacers
- 2013: Donetsk
- 2014: Delaware 87ers
- 2014: Canton Charge
- 2014–2015: Avtodor Saratov
- 2015–2016: Lokomotiv Kuban
- 2016: Cantù
- 2016: Monaco
- 2016–2018: Sidigas Avellino
- 2018–2021: Dnipro
- 2021–2022: Sanaye Hormozgan
- 2022–2023: Al-Nasr SC

Career highlights
- All-VTB United League First Team (2015); NBA D-League All-Star (2008)
- Stats at NBA.com
- Stats at Basketball Reference

Kyrylo Anatoliyovych Fesenko (Ukrainian: Кирило Анатолійович Фесенко; born 24 December 1986) is a Ukrainian former professional basketball player who last played for Al-Nasr SC of the Libyan Division I Basketball League. Standing at 2.16 m (7 ft 1 in), he plays the center position. He wears a size 18 shoe and has a 7 ft 4 in (2.24 m) wingspan and 9 ft 4 in (2.84 m) standing reach (same standing reach as Greg Oden).

== Basketball career ==
=== Early career (2003–2006) ===
Born in Dnipropetrovsk, Fesenko began his basketball career in the Ukrainian Basketball SuperLeague, first with the second division team of BC Azovmash in 2003 then to its first division from 2004 to 2006. He then played for the Cherkaski Mavpy for a season.

=== First NBA stint (2007–2013) ===
After playing four seasons in native Ukraine, Fesenko was selected 38th overall in the second round of the 2007 NBA draft by the Philadelphia 76ers and then traded to the Utah Jazz, signing a three-year contract with the Jazz on 15 August, 2007. In 2010, he turned down a multiyear deal with the Houston Rockets and re-signed with the Jazz for 1 year. He became an unrestricted free agent in 2011. He spent most of his rookie season with the NBA Development League Utah Flash.

On 30 November 2007, Fesenko made his NBA debut against the Los Angeles Lakers. He was recalled from the Utah Flash due to the absence of Carlos Boozer (sprained ankle) and Mehmet Okur (back spasms). Fesenko scored 6 points, had 7 rebounds and managed 1 assist.

Fesenko spent part of the 2011–12 NBA season with the Indiana Pacers. In October 2012, he joined the Chicago Bulls. Later that month he was waived.

=== Return to Europe (2013) ===
In January 2013, Fesenko signed with BC Donetsk. In November 2013, he signed with Śląsk Wrocław. He later left Wrocław before appearing in a game for them.

=== D-League / Return to NBA (2014) ===
In January 2014, Fesenko was acquired by the Delaware 87ers. On March 8, 2014, he was traded to the Canton Charge.

On 18 September 2014, Fesenko signed with the Minnesota Timberwolves. However, he was later waived by the Timberwolves on October 20, 2014.

=== Return to Europe (2014–2021) ===
On 5 November 2014, Fesenko signed with the VTB United League and EuroChallenge team Avtodor Saratov.

On 9 June 2015, Fesenko signed a one-year contract with Lokomotiv Kuban. On January 5, 2016, he parted ways with Lokomotiv, and the following day he was hired until the end of the season by Pallacanestro Cantù. On May 6, 2016, he left Cantù and signed with AS Monaco Basket for the rest of the 2015–16 LNB Pro A season.

On 16 August 2016, Fesenko signed with Italian club Sidigas Avellino for the 2016–17 season. On July 30, 2017, he re-signed with Avellino for one more season.

=== Iran (2021–present) ===
In October 2021, Fesenko signed with Sanaye Hormozgan of the Iranian Basketball Super League.

== NBA career statistics ==
Legend
GP	Games played	GS	Games started	MPG	Minutes per game
FG%	Field goal percentage	3P%	3-point field goal percentage	FT%	Free throw percentage
RPG	Rebounds per game	APG	Assists per game	SPG	Steals per game
BPG	Blocks per game	PPG	Points per game	**Bold**	Career high

=== Regular season ===
Year	Team	GP	GS	MPG	FG%	3P%	FT%	RPG	APG	SPG	BPG	PPG
2007–08	Utah	9	0	7.8	.375	.000	.500	2.8	.2	.0	.3	1.6
2008–09	Utah	21	1	7.4	**.583**	.000	.333	1.8	.2	.3	**.7**	2.3
2009–10	Utah	49	**5**	8.3	.547	.000	.421	1.8	**.3**	.1	.4	2.6
2010–11	Utah	**53**	1	**8.6**	.440	.000	.391	2.0	**.3**	.1	.3	2.0
2011–12	Indiana	3	0	5.7	.400	.000	**.667**	**3.0**	**.3**	**.7**	.0	**2.7**
**Career**		135	7	8.2	.496	.000	.410	2.0	.3	.1	.4	2.3

=== Playoffs ===
Year	Team	GP	GS	MPG	FG%	3P%	FT%	RPG	APG	SPG	BPG	PPG
2009–10	Utah	10	9	18.1	.433	.000	.333	3.9	1.2	.0	.5	3.3

== See also ==
- List of European basketball players in the United States
