= Andrea Zerini =

Italian basketball player (born 1988)

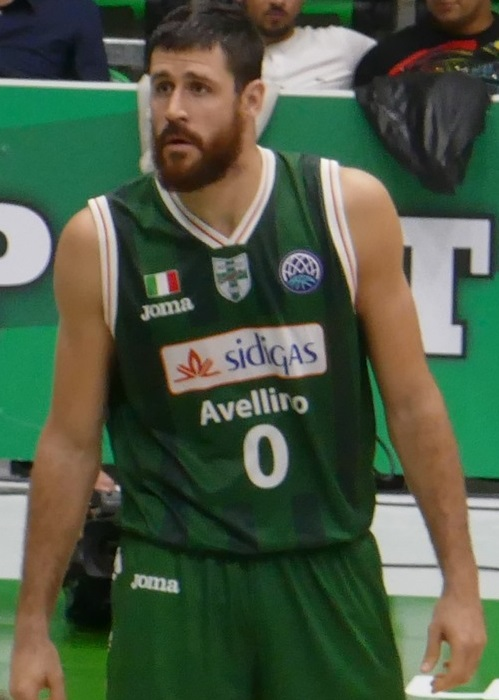

Free Agent
- Position: Power forward / center

Personal information
- Born: 25 October 1988 (age 38) Florence, Italy
- Listed height: 2.05 m (6 ft 9 in)
- Listed weight: 112 kg (247 lb)

Career information
- Playing career: 2005–present

Career history
- 2005–2006: Firenze Basket
- 2006–2009: Castelfiorentino
- 2009–2011: Ruvo di Puglia Basket
- 2011–2016: New Basket Brindisi
- 2016–2018: Sidigas Avellino
- 2018–2020: Germani Basket Brescia
- 2020–2023: Napoli Basket
- 2023–2025: Derthona Basket

Career highlights
- Italian LNP Cup champion (2012)

Andrea Zerini (born 25 October 1988) is an Italian professional basketball player who last played for Derthona Basket of the Italian LBA. Standing at 2.05 metres (6 feet 9 inches), he plays at the forward-center positions.

== Professional career ==
=== Clubs ===
Andrea Zerini grew up with Firenze Basket in Florence of the Serie B Basket league. For the 2005–06 season he entered in the senior-team roster. He went to Castelfiorentino for the next three seasons.

At 21 years old he signed a contract with Ruvo di Puglia Basket where he got 9 points per match, with 55% from 2 and 31% from 3 shots. During the 2010–11 season he was the best blocker and the 8th best rebounder of the league.

For the 2011–2012 season he signed a contract with New Basket Brindisi. He achieved the promotion to the top-tier. So he was confirmed also for the next season. The 2011-12 LBA season was Zerini's first time in the top-tier of the Italian basketball league system.

On 20 June 2016 Andrea Zerini signed a contract with the LBA club Sidigas Avellino. He was confirmed also for the next season.

On 25 June 2018 Zerini went to Germani Basket Brescia.

On 28 July 2020 Zerini signed with Napoli Basket in the Italian second league Serie A2.

On July 1, 2023, he signed with Derthona Basket of the Italian LBA.
