= Palasport Del Mauro =

Indoor sporting arena in Avellino, Italy

- PalaDelMauro
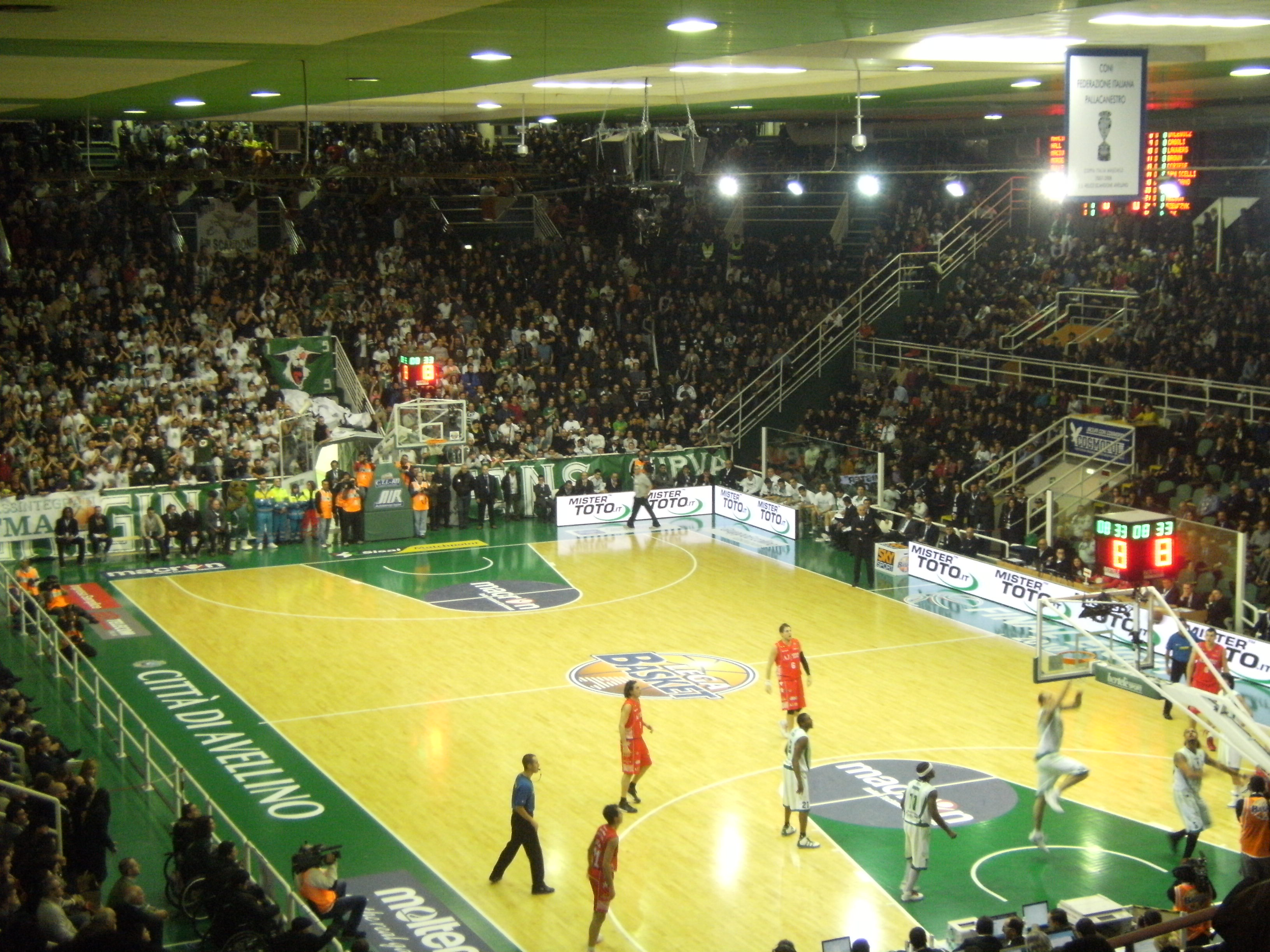
- Interactive map of Palasport Del Mauro
- Full name: Palasport Giacomo Del Mauro
- Location: Piazzale Degli Irpini (Angolo Via Zoccolari) 83100, Avellino (AV)
- Coordinates: 40°55′32.93″N 14°47′21.36″E
- Capacity: 5,300 (basketball)
- Surface: Parquet
- Scoreboard: Yes

Construction
- Renovated: 2008
- Expanded: 2008
- Architect: Vincenzo Genovese
- Structural engineers: Vincenzo Genovese and Orazio De Cola

Tenants
- S.S. Felice Scandone (formerly); Volley Avellino; Del Fes Avellino; S.S. Felice Scandone Avellino 1948

Palasport Giacomo Del Mauro is an indoor sporting arena that is located in Avellino, Italy. The seating capacity of the arena for basketball games is 5,300 people. The arena was primarily used to host home basketball games of the S.S. Felice Scandone professional basketball team, of the Italian League.

== History ==
Palasport Giacomo Del Mauro originally had a 3,600-seating capacity. It was expanded to a 5,300-seating capacity in 2008, specifically in order to meet the minimum capacity requirements for EuroLeague games, which require an arena of at least 5,000 seats. In 2008, the arena's usage rights were also entrusted to Air Avellino, for a period of ten years.

== See also ==
- List of indoor arenas in Italy
