= Jason Rich =

American basketball player (born 1986)

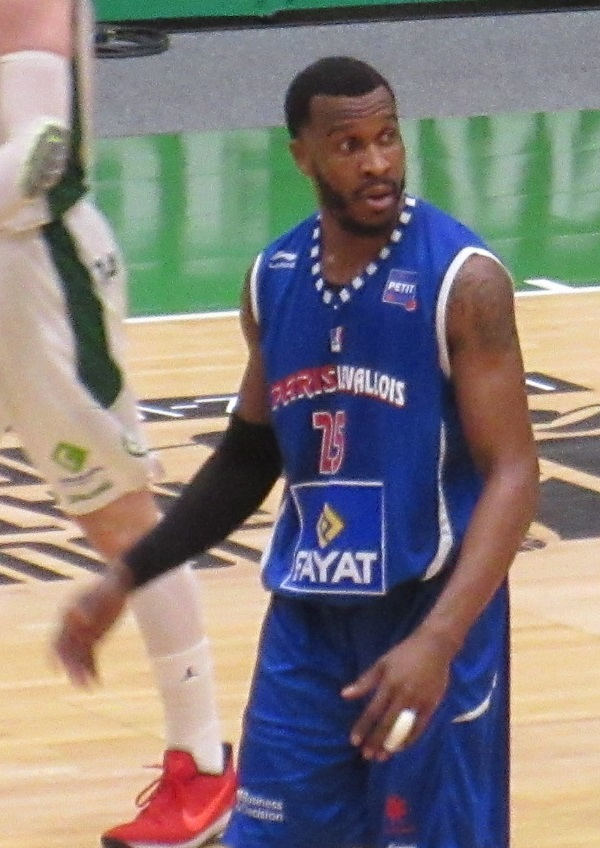
- Rich with Paris-Levallois in 2017

Free agent
- Position: Shooting guard

Personal information
- Born: May 5, 1986 (age 40) Pensacola, Florida, U.S.
- Listed height: 6 ft 3 in (1.91 m)
- Listed weight: 207 lb (94 kg)

Career information
- High school: Dr. Phillips (Orlando, Florida)
- College: Florida State (2004–2008)
- NBA draft: 2008: undrafted
- Playing career: 2008–2020

Career history
- 2008–2009: Cantù
- 2009–2010: Maccabi Haifa
- 2010–2011: Hapoel Jerusalem
- 2011: Oostende
- 2012: Vanoli Cremona
- 2012–2013: Enisey
- 2013–2014: Vanoli Cremona
- 2014–2015: Élan Chalon
- 2015–2017: Paris-Levallois
- 2017–2018: Felice Scandone
- 2018–2019: Beşiktaş
- 2019–2020: Gaziantep Basketbol
- 2021–2022: Napoli Basket
- 2022–2023: Beşiktaş

Career highlights
- LBA Most Valuable Player (2018); LBA Top Scorer (2018); LNB All-Star (2017); Third-team Parade All-American (2004)

Jason Allen Rich (born May 8, 1986) is an American professional basketball player who last played for Beşiktaş Emlakjet of the Basketbol Süper Ligi (BSL). Standing at 1.91 m (6 ft 3 in), Rich played as a guard. He played collegiately for Florida State, until 2008.

== Career ==
Rich played college basketball for Florida State. After graduating, he went to Italy to play for Pallacanestro Cantù. He then played in Israel with Maccabi Haifa and Hapoel Jerusalem. After half a season in Belgium with Telenet Oostende, on January 31, 2013 he returned to Italy and signed a deal until the end of the season with Vanoli Cremona. Rich immediately became the leader of the team and helped the team win nine of the last thirteen games of the season, remaining undefeated at home. In these 14 games he averaged 16.1 points, 3.4 rebounds and 2 assists. After a year in Russia with Enisey Krasnoyarsk, he returned to Vanoli Cremona, signing a one-year deal. In October 2014, he signed with Élan Chalon.

On July 1, 2017, Rich signed with Sidigas Avellino of the Italian LBA. He was named the LBA Most Valuable Player of the season, while also being the league's scoring champion. In the 2018 LBA Playoffs, Rich and Avellino were eliminated in the quarter-finals by Trento, losing 1–3.

He has signed with Turkish club Beşiktaş Sompo Japan on October 17, 2018.

On October 24, 2019, he has signed with Gaziantep Basketbol of the Turkish Basketbol Süper Ligi (BSL).

On June 29, 2020, he has signed with Pallacanestro Varese of the Italian Lega Basket Serie A, but decided to withdraw right after.

Rich returned to play in the season 2021–22 signing with the newly promoted Napoli Basket.

On October 21, 2022, he has signed with Beşiktaş Emlakjet of the Basketbol Süper Ligi (BSL) for a second stint.
