= S.S. Felice Scandone =

Scandone Avellino
- Founded: 1948; 78 years ago
- Folded: 2021; 5 years ago
- History: S.S. Felice Scandone; 1948–2021
- Arena: Palasport Giacomo Del Mauro
- Capacity: 5,300
- Location: Avellino, Campania, Italy
- Team colors: White, Green, Orange
- Championships: 1 Italian Cup
Home	Away

S.S. Felice Scandone was an Italian professional basketball club based in Avellino, Campania. Founded in 1948, the team has been a regular in the Lega Basket Serie A (LBA), the first tier of basketball in Italy, for 19 years (2000/01 to 2018/19). The club won the Italian Cup championship in 2008 and made several appearances in European club competitions, having played for 1 season in EuroLeague (2008/09), 3 seasons in FIBA Champions League (2016/17 to 2018/19) and reached FIBA Europe Cup final in season 2017/18. The club ceased its activities in 2021 due to bankruptcy.

== History ==
The club was founded in 1948 as Felice Scandone Sports Society (S.S.), merging with Libertas Avellino two years later and CSI-Cestistica Irpina in 1968. After going between leagues from 1974 to 1995, the club settled in Serie B1. Two seasons later, coach Gianluca Tucci guided the team to the second division Serie A2. The turn of the millennium saw the side reach the first division Serie A, placing ninth in 2001 at the end of their debut season.

The next seasons were more complicated, with finishes of 14, 15, 16 and 12th place. When coach Zare Markovski, who had been coaching the side since 2002, left in 2005, the club ended the season in 17th place and should have been relegated if not for promoted Roseto's inability to play in the Serie A. Matteo Boniciolli took over coaching duties following that season and kept Avellino away from the relegation places.

The 2007–08 season saw Boniciolli lead Avellino to their best ever league finish of tied second-best with a 23–11 record and a league MVP title for Marques Green, their playoffs run was cut short in the semifinals by Lottomatica Roma (the side who had finished joint second) after they had swept Capo d'Orlando in the quarterfinals. Even better for the side, players such as Green, Devin Smith and Eric Williams led Air Avellino to its first ever title ever, the 2008 Italian Cup, in its first participation in the competition, after beating La Fortezza Bologna 73–67 in the final with 18 points from the game MVP Smith.

The original Scandone logo

The 2008–09 season saw Avellino make their European debut, in the elite EuroLeague. The team had a difficult period between 2011 and 2015, missing the playoffs in multiple occasions and changing the head coach almost every season. In 2016, the team led by coach Pino Sacripanti had a run of 20 victories in 26 games and reached the Italian Cup final, losing to Olimpia Milano. Avellino finished the regular season in 3rd place, and eliminated Giorgio Tesi Group Pistoia 3–0, reaching the league semifinals against Pallacanestro Reggiana, where the Hirpinian team lost the series in game 7 (4–3 overall), despite winning Game 4 by a 43-point margin.

In the 2017–18 season, Scandone played its first European final, in the FIBA Europe Cup. In an all-Italian final it lost to Reyer Venezia.

In July 2019, the LBA announced Scandone was not able to apply for a league license. The team joined the Serie B Basket, the national third level.

In July 2021 the club was declared bankrupt and ceased its sporting activities. An unrelated club named Del Fes Avellino was named in the same year. Club logos and sporting legacies were at disposal of the bankruptcy trustee before getting acquired by a brand new legal entity in 2023, under the name of S.S. Felice Scandone Avellino 1948.

== Honours ==
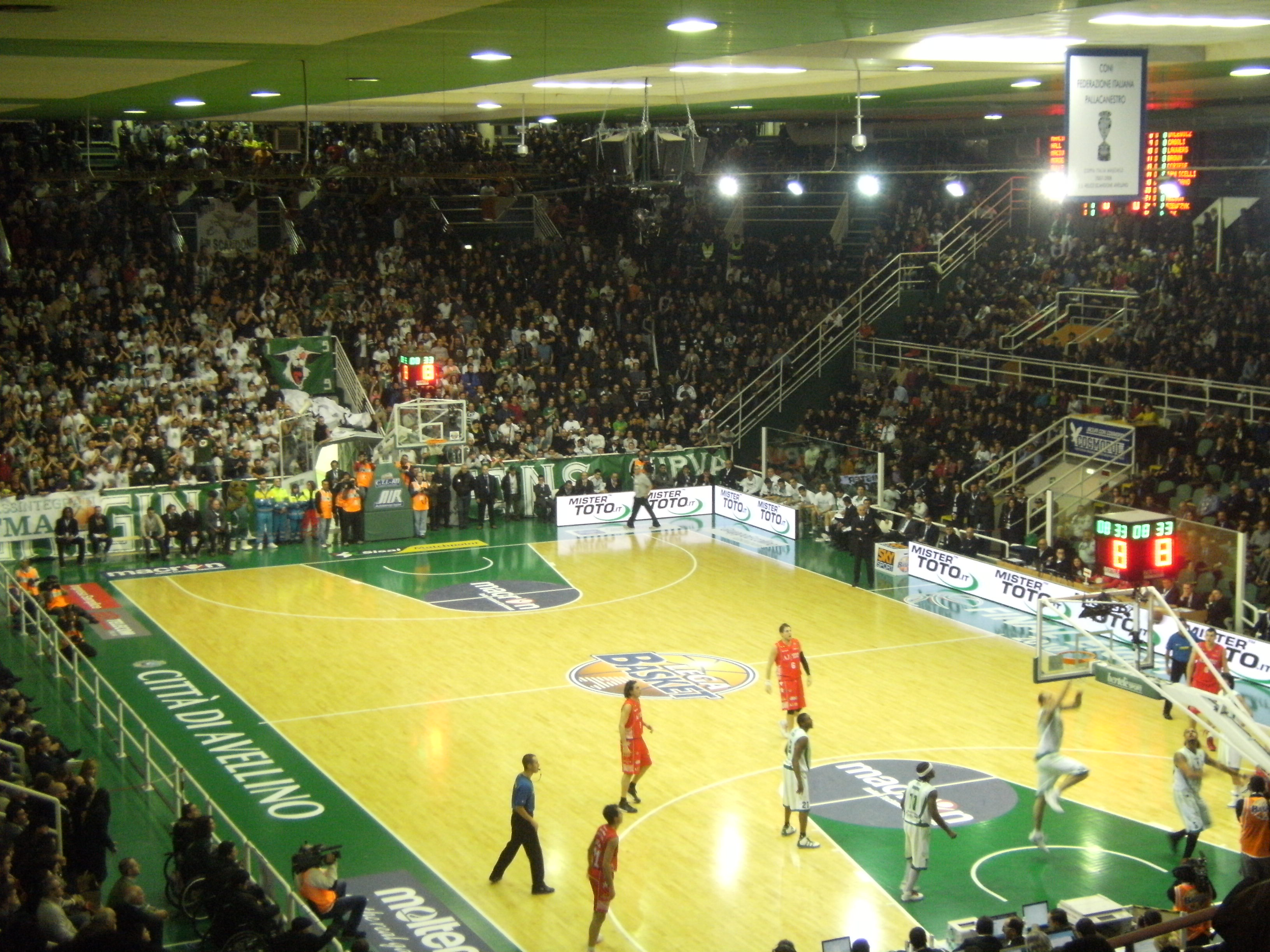
Scene of a home game of Avellino versus Olimpia Milano in 2010

=== Domestic competitions ===
- Italian Cup
  - Winners (1): 2008
    - Runner-up (1): 2016
- Italian Supercup
  - Runner-up (2): 2008, 2016

=== European competitions ===
- FIBA Europe Cup
  - Runner-up: 2017–18

== Players ==
=== Notable players ===
Note: Flags indicate national team eligibility at FIBA-sanctioned events. Players may hold other non-FIBA nationalities not displayed.

Criteria

To appear in this section a player must have either:

- Set a club record or won an individual award while at the club
- Played at least one official international match for their national team at any time
- Played at least one official NBA match at any time.

- (Italy) Gianluca Festa 2 seasons: '99-'00, '00–'01
- (Italy) Alex Righetti 1 season: '07–'08
- (Hungary) Adam Hanga 1 seasons: '14–'15
- (Croatia) Ante Grgurević 1 season: '02–'03
- (Croatia) Arijan Komazec 1 season: '03–'04
- (United Kingdom) Spencer Dunkley 2 seasons: '98–'99, '00–'01
- (Republic of Ireland) Dan Callahan 1 season: '00–'01
- (North Macedonia) Todor Gečevski 1 season: '02–'03
- (Portugal) Sérgio Ramos 1 season: '00–'01
- (South Korea) / (United States) Moon Tae-Jong 1 season: '01–'02
- (Serbia) Dusan Jelic Koutsopoulos 1 season: '02–'03
- (Spain) Ignacio "Nacho" Rodilla 1 season: '04–'05
- (United States) Walter Bond 1 season: '97–'98
- (United States) Brandon Brown 1 season: '05–'06
- (United States) Dee Brown 1 season: '09–'10
- (United States) Steve Burtt Sr. 1 season: '98–'99
- (Canada) Junior Cadougan 1 season: '14–'15
- (United States) Jason Capel 1 season: '06–'07
- (United States) Geno Carlisle 1 season: '01–'02
- (United States) James Collins 1 season: '02–'03
- (United States) Ramel Curry 1 season: '06–'07
- (United States) Terry Dozier 1 season: '97–'98
- (United States) Nate Erdmann 1 season: '00–'01
- (United States) Tellis Frank 1 season: '98–'99
- (United States) Tyrone Grant 1 season: '01–'02
- (United States) Marques Green 1 season: '07–'08
- (United States) Nate Green 2 seasons: '03–'05
- (United States) Harold Jamison 2 seasons: '03–'04, '06–'07
- (United States) Sydney Johnson 2 seasons: '00–'02
- (United States) Herbert Jones 1 season: '99–'00
- (United States) Cuonzo Martin 1 season: '97–'98
- (United States) James Nunnally 1 season: '15–'16
- (United States) Jamal Robinson 1 season: '01–'02
- (United States) Devin Smith 1 season: '07–'08
- (United States) Adonis Thomas
- (United States) David Vanterpool 1 season: '02–'03
- (United States) Damon Williams 1 season: '04–'05
- (United States) David Young 1 season: '05–'06

== Sponsorship names ==
Throughout the years, due to sponsorship, the club has been known as:

- Pasta Baronia Avellino: (1996–1997)
- Cirio Avellino: (1997–1998)
- Select Avellino: (1998–1999)
- Nicoloro Avellino: (1999)
- De Vizia Avellino: (1999–2002)
- Air Avellino: (2002–2011)
- Sidigas Avellino: (2011–2019)
