= 2011–12 Algerian Basketball Championship =

ABC Super Division 2011–12
- League: ABC Super Division
- Sport: Basketball
- Duration: Oct 27, 2011 – May 29, 2012
- Teams: 16
- League champions: GS Pétroliers

Algerian Basketball Championship seasons
- ← 2011 2013 →

The 2011–12 Super Division (50th edition), Algeria's top tier basketball club competition, ran from October 27, 2011 through May 29, 2012. Where he was crowned by the GS Pétroliers for the third time in a row and 15 in its history.

== ABC Super Division Participants (2011–12 Season) ==
Locations of teams for the 2011–12 Algerian Basketball Championship

Promoted from 2nd Division

Team	Home	Venue
CRB Dar Beida	Dar El Beida	Salle de Dar El Beïda
AB Skikda	Skikda	
GS Pétroliers	Algiers	
IRB Bordj Bou Arreridj	Bordj Bou Arréridj	
NB Staoueli	Staoueli	Salle omnisports de Staouéli
OMB Bel Abbès	Sidi Bel Abbès	
CRB Temouchent	Aïn Témouchent	
MS Cherchell	Cherchell	
AU Annaba	Annaba	
NA Hussein Dey	Algiers	
Olympique Batna	Batna	OPOW de Batna
CSM Constantine	Constantine	Salle Zouaghi de Constantine
ASM Blida	Blida	Salle Hocine Chalane
USM Blida	Blida	Salle Hocine Chalane
US Sétif	Sétif	Salle 8 Mai 1945
WA Boufarik	Boufarik	Salle Moussa-Charef

== Regular Season (October 27, 2011 - May 29, 2012) ==
	CRD	USB	GSP	IBA	ASB	CRT	OMB	AUA	OBA	NAH	MSC	ABS	USS	NBS	CSC	WAB	Rec.
CRB Dar Beida		87–82	71–79	85–70	72–78	80–76	99–60	90–40	20–00	83–71	69–60	83–79	79–60	104–75	65–73	66–57	12–3
USM Blida	71–79		48–93	69–63	63–78	64–59	81–58	77–59	82–70	56–52	67–49	77–82	64–66	67–57	64–69	64–65	8–7
GS Pétroliers	97–80	94–60		93–57	91–61	84–52	87–41	111–39	115–61	95–67	82–51	87–59	107–75	104–43	86–93	74–58	14–1
IRB Bordj Bou Arreridj	56–67	79–71	70–110		63–79	82–67	79–63	77–61	61–60	71–70	57–58	77–62	73–69	87–77	61–67	63–76	9–6
ASM Blida	54–85	79–80	68–76	71–62		74–56	77–53	100–62	87–75	75–78	73–49	108–61	59–60	91–77	68–72	71–75	8–7
CRB Temouchent	75–88	77–78	61–95	89–74	69–75		83–71	85–72	87–79	73–65	78–66	87–69	86–75	93–63	65–67	64–82	9–6
OMB Bel Abbès	72–74	65–63	53–81	78–58	43–66	69–61		93–71	73–67	56–59	57–60	70–58	76–81	64–79	58–61	62–85	6–9
AU Annaba	66–89	69–75	33–99	61–83	77–94	51–55	90–73		71–88	63–77	65–54	84–95	72–88	68–76	57–77	64–92	2–13
Olympique Batna	56–63	75–69	58–101	87–73	58–65	73–64	20–00	71–56		86–53	63–51	81–56	76–69	80–74	91–89	66–86	11–4
NA Hussein Dey	74–66	72–74	54–103	73–85	84–69	88–84	69–68	74–46	80–76		70–65	78–69	70–60	66–88	56–98	55–57	9–6
MS Cherchell	71–72	58–56	46–83	75–83	63–76	50–49	63–56	80–53	67–66	52–49		62–59	81–74	65–62	53–64	37–53	9–6
AB Skikda	81–73	70–63	81–126	100–87	76–77	103–60	76–61	88–61	68–60	00–20	64–58		74–69	69–54	81–78	95–104	11–4
US Sétif	84–78	63–67	60–99	88–71	66–93	86–83	62–71	95–68	64–51	80–54	63–51	69–84		65–73	67–69	73–70	8–7
NB Staoueli	77–68	69–63	45–85	76–69	55–57	95–69	20–00	85–79	61–75	64–78	73–71	66–73	64–63		94–87	61–71	9–6
CSM Constantine	89–74	62–61	81–76	78–73	68–66	98–75	107–29	83–63	74–62	87–76	69–63	104–43	81–67	97–76		67–59	15–0
WA Boufarik	83–82	83–71	76–68	64–56	53–58	80–58	74–44	107–65	84–72	62–56	66–33	82–73	65–59	61–57	61–56		14–1
Record	8–7	5–10	13–2	3–12	12–3	1–14	1–14	0–15	2–13	5–10	2–13	4–11	4–11	4–11	11–4	11–4	

- Note: Small number and number in brackets indicate round number and leg, respectively
  Next scheduled games

== Regular season standings ==
Updated as of 19 October 2017.

Pos	Team	M	W	L	PF	PA	D	Pts
1	GS Pétroliers	30	27	3	2786	1792	994	57
2	CSM Constantine	30	26	4	2365	1990	375	56
3	WA Boufarik	30	25	5	2181	1895	286	55
4	CRB Dar Beida	30	20	10	2291	2066	225	50
5	ASM Blida	30	20	10	2247	2022	225	50
6	NA Hussein Dey	30	14	16	1988	2111	-123	44
7	AB Skikda	30	15	15	2148	2266	-118	44*
8	Olympique Batna	30	13	17	2003	2063	-60	43
9	USM Blida	30	13	17	2047	2101	-54	43
10	NB Staoueli	30	13	17	2027	2189	-162	43
11	USM Sétif	30	12	18	2120	2209	-89	42
12	IRB Bordj Bou Arreridj	30	12	18	2120	2244	-124	42
13	MS Cherchell	30	11	19	1762	1971	-209	41
14	CRB Temouchent	30	10	20	2140	2296	-156	40
15	OMB Bel Abbès	30	7	23	1737	2102	-365	35**
16	AU Annaba	30	2	28	1886	2531	-645	32

- 1 loss by default (no point awarded)
  - 2 loss by default (no point awarded)

Champion

== Team champions ==
2011–12 Algerian Basketball Championship winner

Groupement sportif des pétroliers
15th title.

Team roster: Touhami Ghezzoul, Nabil Saidi, Abderrahmane Mostefai, Djillali Canon, Mustapha Adrar, Hocine Gaham, Mohamed Harath, Abdesslem Dekkiche, Mohamed Touati, Smail Amrani, Mahdi Derris, Hamza Kachkach, Soufiane Boukalmouni
Head coach: Bilal Faid
