= 2025–26 Algerian Basketball Championship =

Super Division
- Season: 2025–26
- Duration: September 12, 2025 – 17 March 2026 (play-in tournament); 25 – 29 March 2026 (play-in); 3 – 8 April 2026 (play-offs); 9 – 11 April 2026 (play-downs)
- Teams: 14

Regular season
- Top seed: NB Staouéli
- Relegated: M Ouled Chebel; TRA Draria

Finals
- Champions: WO Boufarik; 11st title
- Runners-up: NB Staouéli
- Semi-finalists: USM Alger; CS Tlemcen

Records
- Biggest home win: WO Boufarik 106–51 NA Hussein Dey (23 October 2025)
- Biggest away win: CRB Dar Beida 41–82 WO Boufarik (November 13, 2025)
- Highest scoring: NB Staouéli 107–102 (OT) US Sétif (November 7, 2025)
- Winning streak: 10 games NB Staouéli
- Losing streak: 14 games M Ouled Chebel
- All statistics correct as of March 17, 2026.

The 2025–26 Super Division (64th edition), Algeria's top tier basketball club competition, ran from September 13, 2025.

== Review ==
The clubs CRB Dar Beida and US Sétif secured promotion to the Algerian Basketball Super Division following their successful campaigns in the final promotion tournament held in Bordj Bou Arréridj. CRB Dar Beida finished at the top of the standings with six points, remaining unbeaten throughout the tournament. US Sétif followed in second place with five points, thus also earning promotion. Despite also finishing with five points, US Biskra missed out on a return to the top flight, while US Sidi Amar, who ended with four points, will remain in Nationale 1 for the upcoming season. This return to the Super Division was seen as well-deserved for both CRB Dar Beida and US Sétif, given their strong performances throughout the season and their consistency during the promotion phase.

Following the regular meeting of the Federal Bureau No. 07 held on June 12, 2025, a series of key decisions and recommendations were approved, including the following: The start of the Super Division for the 2025–26 sports season has been officially scheduled for Friday, September 13, 2025. The U20 championship will commence on Saturday, September 6, 2025, adopting a new organizational structure aimed at reducing travel distances particularly in the southern regions (Division 2) in accordance with a calendar to be issued by the National Technical Department and additionally, national clubs affiliated with the Algerian Basketball Federation are authorized to field and utilize two (02) foreign players, subject to regulatory and administrative conditions that will be defined and communicated later by the National Technical Directorate.

The curtain rises September 12, on the 2025–26 season of the Algerian Basketball Super Division, featuring a total of 14 participating teams and a new competition format recently adopted by the Algerian Basketball Federation (FABB). The 2025–26 Super Division will be played in two phases: a 26-match regular season, followed by play-offs for the title and play-downs to avoid relegation. The top six teams will qualify directly for the play-offs, while the bottom four will battle to avoid relegation. The play-off series will be played in best-of-three or best-of-five formats, with home advantage given to the higher-ranked teams.

Algerian basketball clubs, especially in the men's category, continue to be absent from regional and continental competitions. Indeed, no club from the Super Division will be present at the Arab Club Basketball Championship scheduled to take place from September 25 to October 6 in Dubai. This withdrawal will once again deprive local players of the opportunity to compete against teams that, by recruiting American and African players, have already pulled ahead. According to Ziad Abderrahmane, president of the 3×3 basketball commission and a member of the federation, this decision is purely for financial reasons. Regarding the African competition namely the BAL (Basketball Africa League) Ziad said that no Algerian team will take part in the qualifying stage for the final phase. “We received an invitation from FIBA Africa. The teams we contacted apologized. They all gave the same response: financial problems.

On September 21, 2025, the Algerian Basketball Federation informed all Super Division Men's clubs that compiling statistics during Super Division games for the 2025–26 season is strictly mandatory. Each club is required to appoint two (02) qualified technicians to carry out this task. Clubs that do not have statisticians may use the services of the accredited Statisticians’ Committee, at a cost of 3,500 Algerian dinars per match. The FABB reminds that any failure to comply with this obligation will result in the application of disciplinary sanctions as stipulated in the current regulations.

== Venues and locations ==
=== Promotion and relegation (pre-season) ===
A total of 14 teams will contest the league, including 12 sides from the 2024–25 season and two promoted from the 2024–25 National 1.

Teams promoted from National 1

- CRB Dar Beida
- US Sétif

Teams relegated to National 1

- Olympique Batna
- OS Bordj Bou Arréridj
Locations of teams for the 2025–26 Algerian Basketball Championship
Algiers Province clubs

Promoted from National 1

Team	Home city	Arena
CR Beni Saf	Béni Saf	Salle OMS Yousfi Said
CS Tlemcen	Tlemcen	Salle OMS Kara Zaitri Imama
CSC Djasr Kasentina	Djasr Kasentina	Salle omnisport de Douéra
CRB Dar Beida	Dar El Beïda	Salle OMS de Dar El Beïda
TRA Draria	Draria	Salle OMS Ghazali Salem (Ouled Fayet)
Ouled Chebel Basket Ball	Ouled Chebel	Salle OMS Boualem Bouhedja
NA Hussein Dey	Algiers	Salle Mohamed Handjer
MC Alger	Hydra	Salle OMS Abdelaziz Ben Tifour
NB Staouéli	Staoueli	Salle OMS de Staouéli
Rouiba CB	Rouïba	Salle OMS Mohamed Kadiri
US Sétif	Sétif	Salle 8 Mai 1945
USM Alger	Algiers	Salle OMS Mourad Boukechoura
USM Blida	Blida	Salle Hocine Chalane
WO Boufarik	Boufarik	Salle Moussa Cheraf

== Regular season ==
=== League table ===
Pos	Team	Pld	W	L	GF	GA	GD	Pts	
1	NB Staouéli	26	20	6	1982	1816	+166	46	Advance to play-off
2	WO Boufarik	26	17	9	2083	1838	+245	43	Advance to play-off
3	CS Tlemcen	26	17	9	1753	1665	+88	43	Advance to play-off
4	USM Alger	26	16	10	1818	1685	+133	42	Advance to play-off
5	USM Blida	26	16	10	1690	1625	+65	42	Advance to play-off
6	Rouiba CB	26	16	10	1832	1736	+96	42	Advance to play-off
7	MC Alger	26	16	10	1858	1766	+92	42	Advance to Play-in
8	CR Beni Saf	26	16	10	1748	1751	−3	42	Advance to Play-in
9	CSC Djasr Kasentina	26	12	14	1808	1872	−64	38	Advance to Play-in
10	CRB Dar Beida	26	10	16	1590	1729	−139	36	Advance to Play-in
11	US Sétif	26	9	17	1805	1903	−98	35	Advance to Play-down
12	TRA Draria	26	8	18	1763	1902	−139	34	Advance to Play-down
13	NA Hussein Dey	26	5	21	1695	1930	−235	31	Advance to Play-down
14	M Ouled Chebel	26	4	22	1680	1887	−207	30	Advance to Play-down

First match(es) will be played: March 17, 2026. Source: FABB

=== Results ===
	CBS	CDB	CST	CSC	NBS	NAH	MCA	MOC	TRD	RCB	USS	UAL	USB	WOB	Rec.
CR Beni Saf		64–73; 17 Oct 6(1)	63–66; 31 Oct 8(1)	67–59; 2 Jan 17(2)	68–61; 14 Mar 26(2)	68–61; 26 Sep 3(1)	73–67; 14 Nov 10(1)	75–61; 5 Dec 12(1)	80–69; 17 Jan 20(2)	73–71; 23 Dec 15(2)	69–50; 13 Sep 1(1)	55–67; 21 Feb 24(2)	65–61; 10 Oct 5(1)	68–64; 7 Feb 22(2)	10–3
CRB Dar Beida	60–71; 13 Jan 18(2)		56–62; 7 Feb 22(2)	58–61; 11 Oct 5(1)	59–88; 12 Sep 1(1)	69–50; 1 Jan 17(2)	58–68; 23 Feb 24(2)	50–66; 14 Mar 26(2)	66–55; 31 Oct 8(1)	76–74; 27 Sep 3(1)	69–67; 23 Dec 15(2)	59–66; 5 Dec 12(1)	67–57; 25 0ct 7(1)	41–82; 13 Nov 10(1)	5–8
CS Tlemcen	54–55; 3 Feb 21(2)	66–51; 7 Nov 9(1)		56–62; 24 0ct 7(1)	58–60; 26 Sep 3(1)	61–51; 10 Jan 18(2)	82–72; 14 Mar 26(2)	58–52; 23 Dec 15(2)	69–64; 17 Feb 23(2)	59–56; 10 Oct 5(1)	70–57; 2 Jan 17(2)	61–63; 13 Sep 1(1)	62–47; 28 Nov 11(1)	68–67 (OT); 5 Dec 12(1)	9–4
CSC Djasr Kasentina	72–74; 3 Oct 4(1)	52–45; 6 Jan 18(2)	79–87; 13 Feb 20(2)		66–84; 5 Dec 12(1)	84–69; 23 Dec 15(2)	76–68; 7 Feb 22(2)	64–62; 21 Feb 24(2)	71–78; 17 Oct 6(1)	64–84; 12 Sep 1(1)	69–79; 17 Mar 26(2)	75–71; 14 Nov 10(1)	60–74; 26 Sep 3(1)	83–95; 1 Nov 8(1)	5–8
NB Staouéli	74–63; 12 Dec 13(1)	82–67; 18 Dec 14(2)	63–79; 27 Dec 16(2)	77–73; 7 Mar 25(2)		77–54; 29 Nov 11(1)	69–71; 6 Jan 18(2)	72–64; 17 Jan 20(2)	86–84; 19 Sep 2(1)	68–75; 17 Feb 23(2)	107–102 (OT); 7 Nov 9(1)	64–61; 18 Oct 6(1)	82–69; 3 Feb 21(2)	87–84; 4 Oct 4(1)	10–3
NA Hussein Dey	85–67; 27 Dec 16(2)	63–67; 3 Oct 4(1)	70–77; 17 Oct 6(1)	58–81; 19 Sep 2(1)	81–90; 21 Feb 24(2)		71–81; 1 Nov 8(1)	70–59; 14 Nov 10(1)	66–75; 27 Jan 18(2)	59–71; 17 Mar 26(2)	71–75; 5 Dec 12(1)	71–61; 7 Feb 22(2)	55–62; 12 Sep 1(1)	77–86; 17 Jan 20(2)	3–10
MC Alger	79–59; 17 Feb 23(2)	58–66; 29 Nov 11(1)	68–63; 12 Dec 13(1)	70–72; 8 Nov 9(1)	71–61; 11 Oct 5(1)	78–63; 3 Feb 21(2)		85–69; 2 Jan 17(2)	102–68; 5 Mar 25(2)	81–78; 25 0ct 7(1)	66–52; 27 Jan 18(2)	69–68; 26 Sep 3(1)	43–55; 23 Dec 15(2)	62–70; 19 Dec 14(2)	9–4
M Ouled Chebel	51–76; 6 Mar 25(2)	60–61; 12 Dec 13(1)	64–70; 20 Sep 2(1)	90–88 (OT); 28 Nov 11(1)	62–68; 24 0ct 7(1)	72–73; 17 Feb 23(2)	70–79; 3 Oct 4(1)		62–71; 19 Dec 14(2)	74–80; 7 Nov 9(1)	68–75; 3 Feb 21(2)	60–72; 6 Jan 18(2)	57–65; 13 Jan 18(2)	59–79; 27 Dec 16(2)	1–12
TRA Draria	61–58; 24 0ct 7(1)	62–64; 3 Feb 21(2)	75–84; 14 Nov 10(1)	53–61; 13 Jan 18(2)	70–87; 23 Jan 15(2)	66–65; 10 Oct 5(1)	81–85; 5 Dec 12(1)	78–83; 12 Sep 1(1)		85–84; 2 Jan 17(2)	65–58; 26 Sep 3(1)	57–64; 14 Mar 26(2)	67–78; 8 Nov 9(1)	71–77; 21 Feb 24(2)	4–9
Rouiba CB	68–38; 19 Sep 2(1)	70–55; 27 Dec 16(2)	83–79 (OT); 27 Jan 18(2)	81–69; 18 Dec 14(2)	69–78; 13 Nov 10(1)	69–64; 11 Dec 13(1)	57–54; 17 Jan 20(2)	79–61; 7 Feb 22(2)	64–68; 2 Oct 4(1)		70–59; 21 Feb 24(2)	68–58; 1 Nov 8(1)	42–53; 6 Mar 25(2)	79–70; 17 Oct 6(1)	10–3
US Sétif	70–56; 19 Dec 14(2)	69–65; 20 Sep 2(1)	71–76; 3 Oct 4(1)	69–70; 12 Dec 13(1)	62–74; 7 Feb 22(2)	82–67; 7 Mar 25(2)	58–89; 17 Oct 6(1)	67–72; 31 Oct 8(1)	80–74; 27 Dec 16(2)	69–78; 29 Nov 11(1)		79–75; 17 Jan 20(2)	54–56; 17 Feb 23(2)	80–69; 6 Jan 18(2)	6–7
USM Alger	78–81; 29 Nov 11(1)	76–63; 6 Mar 25(2)	60–57; 19 Dec 14(2)	73–64; 17 Feb 23(2)	67–69; Jan 18(2)	80–55; 8 Nov 9(1)	74–65; 27 Dec 16(2)	67–54; 10 Oct 5(1)	70–59; 13 Dec 13(1)	70–49; 3 Feb 21(2)	102–83; 24 0ct 7(1)		63–56; 2 Jan 17(2)	83–68; 19 Sep 2(1)	11–2
USM Blida	89–80; 6 Jan 18(2)	61–57; 17 Jan 20(2)	59–53; 21 Feb 24(2)	76–58; 27 Dec 16(2)	56–82; 31 Oct 8(1)	66–75; 19 Dec 14(2)	56–64; 19 Sep 2(1)	82–53; 18 Oct 6(1)	52–42; 7 Feb 22(2)	64–66; 5 Dec 12(1)	71–62; 14 Nov 10(1)	77–67; 3 Oct 4(1)		72–71; 14 Mar 26(2)	9–4
WO Boufarik	80–82; 7 Nov 9(1)	79–68; 16 Feb 23(2)	97–76; 7 Mar 25(2)	74–75 (OT); 3 Feb 21(2)	81–72; 2 Jan 17(2)	106–51; 23 0ct 7(1)	97–63; 13 Sep 1(1)	83–75; 26 Sep 3(1)	86–65; 2 Dec 11(1)	88–67; 13 Jan 18(2)	85–76; 10 Oct 5(1)	67–62; 23 Dec 15(2)	78–76; 11 Dec 13(1)		11–2
Record	6–7	5–8	8–5	7–6	10–3	2–11	7–6	3–10	4–9	6–7	3–10	5–8	7–6	6–7	

- Note: Small number and number in brackets indicate round number and leg, respectively

=== Clubs season-progress ===
Team ╲ Round	1	2	3	4	5	6	7	8	9	10	11	12	13	14	15	16	17	18	19	20	21	22	23	24	25	26
CRB Dar Beida	L	L	W	W	L	W	W	W	L	L	W	L	W	L	W	L	W	L	L	L	W	L	L	L	L	L
CR Beni Saf	W	L	W	W	W	L	L	L	W	W	W	W	L	L	W	L	W	L	W	W	W	W	L	L	W	W
CSC Djasr Kasentina	L	W	L	L	W	L	W	L	W	W	L	L	W	L	W	L	L	W	W	L	W	W	L	W	L	L
CS Tlemcen	L	W	L	W	W	W	L	W	W	W	W	W	L	L	W	W	W	L	W	W	L	W	W	L	L	W
NB Staouéli	W	W	W	W	L	W	W	W	W	W	W	W	W	W	W	L	L	L	W	W	W	W	L	W	W	L
NA Hussein Dey	L	L	L	L	L	L	L	L	L	W	L	L	L	W	L	W	L	L	L	L	L	W	W	L	L	L
MC Alger	L	W	W	W	W	W	W	W	L	L	L	W	W	L	L	L	W	W	W	L	W	L	W	W	W	L
M Ouled Chebel	W	L	L	L	L	L	L	W	L	L	W	L	L	L	L	L	L	L	L	L	L	L	L	L	L	W
TRA Draria	L	L	W	W	W	W	W	L	L	L	L	L	L	W	L	L	W	W	L	L	L	L	L	L	L	L
Rouiba CB	W	W	L	L	L	W	L	W	W	L	W	W	W	W	L	W	L	W	L	W	L	W	W	W	L	W
US Sétif	L	W	L	L	L	L	L	L	L	L	L	W	L	W	L	W	L	W	L	W	W	L	L	L	W	W
USM Alger	W	W	L	L	W	L	W	L	W	L	L	W	W	W	L	W	W	W	L	L	W	L	W	W	W	W
USM Blida	W	L	W	W	L	W	L	L	W	W	L	L	L	L	W	W	L	W	W	W	L	W	W	W	W	W
WO Boufarik	W	L	W	L	W	L	W	W	L	W	W	L	W	W	W	W	W	L	W	W	L	L	W	W	W	L

Updated to match(es) played on March 17, 2025. Source: FABB
W = Win; L = Lose

== Statistical leaders ==
As of 17 March 2026

=== Points ===
Pos	Player	Club	PPG
1	(Algeria) Abdelmalek Kaci	M Ouled Chebel	18.5
2	(Algeria) Mohamed Amine Bensalah	NB Staouéli	16.42
3	(Algeria) Zakaria Guezout	CSC Djasr Kasentina	16.25
4	(Algeria) Nabil Nouari	TRA Draria	15.96
5	(Algeria) Mustapha Braik	CS Tlemcen	15.88

=== Rebounds ===
Pos	Player	Club	RPG
1	(Democratic Republic of the Congo) Arsène Mutomb Mbav	US Sétif	11.25
2	(Algeria) Sid Ali Ben Zaim	Rouiba CB	10.33
3	(Algeria) Rabah Zitoun	WO Boufarik	10.12
4	(Algeria) Hezil Yamame	CSC Djasr Kasentina	9.96
5	(Algeria) Mehdi Zaim	USM Alger	8.56

=== Assists ===
Pos	Player	Club	APG
1	(Algeria) Tarek Hamdani	WO Boufarik	7.65
2	(Algeria) Yacine Kalkoul	US Sétif	6.85
3	(Algeria) Merouane Bourkaib	MC Alger	5.96
4	(Algeria) Mohamed Zaki Guermat	Rouiba CB	5.53
5	(Algeria) Anis Mohamed Fedala	NB Staouéli	5.04

Source: Super Division

== Play-in ==
The teams ranked 7th, 8th, 9th, and 10th compete in the Play-In stage under the following format: The 7th-placed team faces the 8th-placed team, while the 9th-placed team plays against the 10th-placed team. The winner of the 7th vs 8th game qualifies directly for the playoffs. The loser of the 7th vs 8th game plays a decisive match against the winner of the 9th vs 10th game. The winner of this final game secures the last spot to complete the eight-team playoff bracket.

=== Seventh vs. Eighth ===
March 25, 2026
16:00

Boxscore

MC Alger	82–62	CR Beni Saf
Scoring by quarter: 21–13, 23–24, 18–17, 20–8
Pts: Mohamed Seddik Touati 26; Rebs: Mohamed Seddik Touati 17; Asts: Merouane Bourkaib 7		Pts: Mohamed Azzi 11; Rebs: Houssam Moussa Benyacine 8 Asts: Issam Benarbia 5

Salle OMS Abdelaziz Ben Tifour, Hydra
Attendance: 400
Referees: Larouci Adlene, Osmane Sidali, Fouchene Abderrezak

Mouloudia outrebounded CR Beni Saf 65-33 including a 22–9 advantage in offensive rebounds. Mouloudia looked well-organized offensively handing out 23 assists. 28 personal fouls committed by CR Beni Saf helped opponents get some easy free throw opportunities. The former international center Mohamed Seddik Touati stepped up with a double-double by scoring 26 points and 17 rebounds for the winners and the former international point guard Merouane Bourkaib chipped in 14 points, 7 rebounds and 7 assists. Four Mouloudia players scored in double figures. At the losing side guard Houssam Moussa responded with 8 points and 8 rebounds and guard Imad Didi scored 10 points and 4 assists. Both coaches used bench players which allowed the starters a little rest for the next games.

=== Ninth vs. Tenth ===
March 25, 2026
18:00

Boxscore

CSC Djasr Kasentina	57–71	CRB Dar Beida
Scoring by quarter: 11–18, 17–18, 23–13, 6–22
Pts: Three players 12; Rebs: Zakaria Guezout 14; Asts: Lotfi Adrar 5		Pts: Ishak Yacine Bouamama 32; Rebs: Traore Namakan, Younes Benanesbaghor 9 Asts: Three players 5

Salle omnisport de Douéra, Douéra
Attendance: 70
Referees: Bouarifi Mohamed, Harrache Mouad, Kahil Yacine

CR Dar Beida forced 20 CSC Djasr turnovers. 24 personal fouls committed by CSC Djasr helped opponents get some easy free throw opportunities. Ishak Yacine Bouamama stepped up and scored 32 points, 6 rebounds, 5 assists and 4 steals for the winners and Mali forward Traore Namakan chipped in 16 points and 9 rebounds. At the losing side the former international forward Zakaria Guezout responded with 8 points and 14 rebounds and forward Lotfi Adrar scored 12 points, 6 rebounds and 5 assists. CSC Djasr's coach Sofiane Boulahia rotated twelve players which allowed the starters a little rest for the next games.

=== Decisive playoff qualifier ===
March 29, 2026
18:00

Boxscore

CR Beni Saf	68–67	CRB Dar Beida
Scoring by quarter: 23–15, 15–19, 18–17, 12–16
Pts: Djaouad Belabbes 21; Rebs: Mohamed Azzi 10; Asts: Issam Benarbia 5		Pts: Sif Eddine Benbrahimn, Mohamed Belhadi 14; Rebs: Three players 6 Asts: Ishak Yacine Bouamama 5

Salle OMS Yousfi Said, Béni Saf
Attendance: 600
Referees: Larouci Adlene, Kaddour Hamid, Emtir Sahraoui

CR Beni Saf dominated down low during the game scoring 46 of its points in the paint compared to CR Dar Beida's 20. Guard Djaouad Belabbes scored 21 points (on 9-of-11 shooting from the field) to lead the charge for the winners and French-Mali guard Mamadou Keita chipped in 14 points during the contest. CR Beni Saf's coach Didi Said used an eleven-player rotation in such tough game. Younes Benanesbaghor responded with 12 points and 6 rebounds and Ishak Yacine Bouamama scored 11 points, 5 assists and 4 steals. Four CR Dar Beida players scored in double figures.

== Play-offs ==
The playoffs began on April 3, 2026.

Quarter-finals
1	NB Staouéli	66	48	62	2
8	CR Beni Saf	56	56	57	1
4	USM Alger	72	61	2
5	USM Blida	62	58	0
2	WO Boufarik	91	63	98	2
7	MC Alger	75	71	94	1
3	CS Tlemcen	66	62	2
6	Rouiba CB	57	52	0

Semi-finals
1	NB Staouéli	75	60	2
4	USM Alger	64	57	0
2	WO Boufarik	62	80	2
3	CS Tlemcen	55	73	0

Finals
NB Staouéli	82	79	1
WO Boufarik	64	87	1

=== Quarter-finals ===
==== (1) NB Staouéli vs. (8) CR Beni Saf ====
April 3, 2026
16:00

Boxscore

NB Staouéli	66–56	CR Beni Saf
Scoring by quarter: 19–15, 18–7, 15–17, 14–17
Pts: Merouane Yahya 18; Rebs: Mohamed Amine Bensalah, Abderraouf Benrighi 9 Asts: Anis Mohamed Fedala 9		Pts: Issam Benarbia 19; Rebs: Houssam Moussa Benyacine 10; Asts: Imad Didi 4
NB Staouéli leads series, 1–0

Salle OMS de Staouéli, Staoueli
Attendance: 100
Referees: Larouci Adlen, Harrache Mouad, Fouchane Abderrezak

Nadi Basket forced 21 CR Beni Saf turnovers. They looked well-organized offensively handing out 22 assists. Guard Merouane Yahya stepped up and scored 20 points and 4 assists for the winners and Mohamed Amine Bensalah chipped in 11 points and 9 rebounds. Four Nadi Basket players scored in double figures. At the losing side guard Issam Benarbia responded with 19 points and guard Houssam Moussa Benyacine scored 4 points and 10 rebounds. Both coaches used bench players which allowed the starters a little rest for the next games.

April 8, 2026
16:00

Boxscore

CR Beni Saf	56–48	NB Staouéli
Scoring by quarter: 16–13, 13–12, 10–8, 17–15
Pts: Mamadou Keita 15; Rebs: Brahim Maaziz 8 Asts: Houssam Moussa Benyacine 4		Pts: Mohamed Amine Bensalah 21; Rebs: Khaled Ouahab 11; Asts: Anis Mohamed Fedala 6
Series tied, 1–1

Salle OMS Yousfi Said, Béni Saf
Attendance: 200
Referees: Kahallou Adel, Bouarifi Mohamed, Chaib Fethi

CR Beni Saf held Nadi Basket to an opponent 24.5 percent shooting from the field compared to 33.8 percent accuracy of the winners. They outrebounded Nadi Basket 46-35 including 35 on the defensive glass. French-Mali guard Mamadou Keita scored 15 points and 7 rebounds to lead the charge for the winners and guard Imad Didi chipped in 10 points and 7 rebounds during the contest. Mohamed Amine Bensalah responded with a double-double by scoring 21 points and 10 rebounds and the former international forward Khaled Ouahab scored 5 points and 11 rebounds.

April 12, 2026
17:00

Boxscore

NB Staouéli	62–57	CR Beni Saf
Scoring by quarter: 18–10, 15–17, 16–7, 13–23
Pts: Mohamed Amine Bensalah 22; Rebs: Mohamed Amine Bensalah 12; Asts: There players 3		Pts: Mohamed Azzi 15; Rebs: Brahim Maaziz 8 Asts: Imad Didi 5
NB Staouéli wins series, 2–1

Salle OMS de Staouéli, Staoueli
Attendance: 500
Referees: Adlene Laarouci, Adel Kahalou, Anis Benani

Nadi Basket held CR Beni Saf to an opponent 21.9 percent shooting from the field compared to 25.0 percent accuracy of the winners. Nadi Basket forced 19 CR Beni Saf turnovers and had a 38–26 advantage in offensive rebounds. CR Beni Saf was plagued by 32 personal fouls down the stretch. It was a quality performance for Mohamed Amine Bensalah who led the winners with a double-double by scoring 22 points and 12 rebounds. The former international forward Abderraouf Benrighi accounted for 7 points and 11 rebounds for the winning side. Forward Mohamed Azzi came up with 15 points and 6 rebounds (went 7 for 7 at the free throw line) and guard Issam Benarbia added 14 points and 5 rebounds respectively for CR Beni Saf in the defeat. CR Beni Saf's coach Didi Said tested ten players, but that didn't help to avoid defeat in this game.

==== (2) WO Boufarik vs. (7) MC Alger ====
April 3, 2026
18:00

Boxscore

WO Boufarik	91–75	MC Alger
Scoring by quarter: 19–22, 22–22, 21–18, 29–13
Pts: Ali Mohamed Messad 16; Rebs: Rabah Zitoun 9 Asts: Tarek Hamdani 11		Pts: Ramzi Merahi 22; Rebs: Samir Mokdad 9 Asts: Merouane Bourkaib 7
WO Boufarik leads series, 1–0

Salle Moussa Cheraf, Boufarik
Attendance: 800
Referees: Bennani Anis, Hammada Sofiane, Latibi Wahid

Widad looked well-organized offensively handing out 27 assists comparing to just 14 passes made by Mouloudia's players. The former international point guard Tarek Hamdani stepped up with a double-double by scoring 13 points, 8 rebounds and 11 assists for the winners and the former international forward Ali Mohamed Messad chipped in 16 points and 5 rebounds. Four Widad players scored in double figures. At the losing side the former international forward Ramzi Merahi responded with 22 points and 6 rebounds and the former international point guard Merouane Bourkaib scored 16 points, 5 rebounds and 7 assists. Both coaches used bench players which allowed the starters a little rest for the next games.

April 8, 2026
16:00

Boxscore

MC Alger	71–63	WO Boufarik
Scoring by quarter: 20–13, 15–20, 28–16, 8–14
Pts: Abdelkrim Ziane 13; Rebs: Samir Mokdad 13; Asts: Ramzi Merahi 7		Pts: Tarek Hamdani, Kadour Mitidji 18; Rebs: Djamel Eddine Achache 11; Asts: Tarek Hamdani 5
Series tied, 1–1

Salle OMS Abdelaziz Ben Tifour, Hydra
Attendance: 600
Referees: Si Youcef Sofiane, Hamid Kaddour, Harrache Mouad

Mouloudia outrebounded Widad 50-38 including 17 on the offensive glass. The best player for the winners was Samir Mokdad who had a double-double by scoring 11 points and 13 rebounds. The former international forward Ramzi Merahi chipped in 10 points, 7 rebounds and 7 assists. Four Mouloudia players scored in double figures. The former international point guard Tarek Hamdani produced 18 points, 5 assists and 4 steals and forward Kadour Mitidji added 18 points and 6 rebounds respectively for the guests. Both coaches used bench players which allowed the starters a little rest for the next games.

April 12, 2026
18:00

Boxscore

WO Boufarik	98–94	MC Alger
Scoring by quarter: 29–22, 22–17, 22–24, 25–31
Pts: Kadour Mitidji 26; Rebs: Rabah Zitoun 14; Asts: Tarek Hamdani 5		Pts: Ramzi Merahi 19; Rebs: Mustapha Adrar 10; Asts: Merouane Bourkaib 8
WO Boufarik wins series, 2–1

Salle Moussa Cheraf, Boufarik
Attendance: 2000
Referees: Si Youcef Sofiane, Hamada Sofiane, Latibi Wahid

WO Boufarik dominated down low during the game scoring 54 of its points in the paint compared to Mouloudia's 34. Widad forced 22 Mouloudia turnovers. Strangely Mouloudia outrebounded Widad 53-35 including a 32–20 advantage in defensive rebounds. 26 personal fouls committed by Mouloudia helped opponents get some easy free throw opportunities. It was a great evening for forward Kadour Mitidji who led his team to a victory scoring 26 points and 4 assists. The former international center Rabah Zitoun helped adding 14 points and 14 rebounds. The best for the losing side was the former international forward Ramzi Merahi with 19 points and 6 rebounds and the former international center Mustapha Adrar produced a double-double by scoring 15 points and 10 rebounds. Four Widad and five Mouloudia players scored in double figures. Mouloudia's coach Maamar Berrich rotated ten players in this game, but that didn't help.

==== (3) CS Tlemcen vs. (6) Rouiba CB ====
April 3, 2026
16:00

Boxscore

CS Tlemcen	66–57	Rouiba CB
Scoring by quarter: 14–10, 14–12, 21–20, 17–15
Pts: Mustapha Braik 19; Rebs: Farouk Hadjadj-Aoul 8 Asts: There players 4		Pts: Ziad Chenieff 18; Rebs: Abd Erraouf Redouane 12; Asts: Three players 2
CS Tlemcen leads series, 1–0

Salle OMS Kara Zaitri Imama, Tlemcen
Attendance: 200
Referees: Kahallou Adel, Osmane Sidali, Benmendil Houari

Chabab Sportif dominated down low during the game scoring 36 of its points in the paint compared to Rouiba's 14. Chadian center Abakar Outman Oumar stepped up with a double-double by scoring 18 points and 12 rebounds for the winners and Mustapha Braik chipped in 19 points, 5 rebounds, 4 assists and 6 steals. Four Chabab Sportif players scored in double figures. At the losing side forward Abd Erraouf Redouane responded with a double-double by scoring 10 points and 12 rebounds and Ziad Chenieff scored 18 points (made all of his seven free throws). Rouiba's coach Mohamed Khideche rotated ten players in this game, but that didn't help.

April 8, 2026
16:00

Boxscore

Rouiba CB	52–62	CS Tlemcen
Scoring by quarter: 16–20, 13–10, 11–15, 12–17
Pts: Abdel Hakim Abaz 11; Rebs: Sid Ali Ben Zaim 14; Asts: Abd Erraouf Redouane 3		Pts: Abakar Outman Oumar 19; Rebs: Abakar Outman Oumar 15; Asts: Farouk Hadjadj-Aoul 5
CS Tlemcen wins series, 2–0

Salle OMS Mohamed Kadiri, Rouïba
Attendance: 333
Referees: Larouci Adlen, Fouchane Abderrezak, Meheni Habib

CS Tlemcen outrebounded Rouiba CB 47-34 including 16 on the offensive glass. Chadian center Abakar Outman Oumar notched a double-double by scoring 19 points and 15 rebounds to lead the effort and the former international forward Seyyid Ahmed Bensalah supported him with 12 points and 7 rebounds. Even a double-double of 12 points and 14 rebounds by center Sid Ali Ben Zaim did not help to save the game for Rouiba. Guard Abdel Hakim Abaz added 11 points and 9 rebounds for the hosts.

==== (4) USM Alger vs. (5) USM Blida ====
April 3, 2026
17:00

Boxscore

USM Alger	72–62	USM Blida
Scoring by quarter: 15–23, 18–16, 26–10, 13–13
Pts: Ahmed Boutiba 23; Rebs: Laamouri Merahi 13; Asts: Laamouri Merahi 7		Pts: Mousaab Kaoub, Mohamed Boudoumi 19; Rebs: Mohamed Boudoumi 7 Asts: Mousaab Kaoub, Mohamed Zidouni 3
USM Alger leads series, 1–0

Salle OMS Abdelaziz Ben Tifour, Hydra
Attendance: 150
Referees: Si Youcef Sofiane, Hamid Kaddour, Fritah Mohamed Anis

The former international swingman Laamouri Merahi stepped up with a double-double by scoring 16 points, 13 rebounds and 7 assists for the winners and guard Ahmed Boutiba chipped in 23 points and 6 rebounds. At the losing side forward Mohamed Boudoumi responded with 19 points and 7 rebounds and the former international forward Mousaab Kaoub scored 19 points. USM Blida's coach Ahmed Ben Djabou rotated ten players in this game, but that didn't help.

April 8, 2026
17:00

Boxscore

USM Blida	58–61	USM Alger
Scoring by quarter: 18–11, 14–20, 11–14, 15–16
Pts: Mohamed Zahaf 21; Rebs: Azeddine Boulesnane 6 Asts: Azeddine Boulesnane, Mohamed Zahaf 2		Pts: Ahmed Boutiba 17; Rebs: Mehdi Zaim 11; Asts: Ramdane Belhadj 5
USM Alger wins series, 2–0

Salle Hocine Chalane, Blida
Attendance: 150
Referees: Bennani Anis, Hammada Sofiane, Latibi Wahid

The best player for the winners was guard Ahmed Boutiba who scored 17 points. The former international swingman Laamouri Merahi chipped in 9 points and 8 rebounds. Forward Mohamed Zahaf produced 21 points and the former international forward Mousaab Kaoubadded 12 points and 5 rebounds respectively for the hosts.

=== Semi-finals ===
==== (1) NB Staouéli vs. (4) USM Alger ====
NB Staouéli dominated down low during the game scoring 54 of its points in the paint compared to USM Alger's 32. The former international guard Hichem Dekakene nailed 28 points for the winning side and Mohamed Amine Bensalah accounted for 18 points and 8 rebounds. Guard Ahmed Boutiba came up with 15 points and 8 rebounds and guard Zakariya Khodja added 4 points, 5 rebounds and 11 assists respectively for USM Alger in the defeat. Four USM Alger players scored in double figures. USM Alger's coach Kamel Ait Kaci rotated ten players in this game, but that didn't help.

April 21, 2026
19:00

Boxscore

NB Staouéli	75–64	USM Alger
Scoring by quarter: 22–18, 20–14, 13–20, 20–12
Pts: Hichem Dekakene 28; Rebs: Mohamed Amine Bensalah 8 Asts: Merouane Yahya 5		Pts: Ahmed Boutiba 15; Rebs: Ahmed Boutiba 8 Asts: Zakariya Khodja 11
NB Staouéli leads series, 1–0

Salle OMS de Staouéli, Staoueli
Attendance: 1200
Referees: Larouci Adlen, Kahallou Adel, Hammada Sofiane

April 24, 2026
17:00

Boxscore

USM Alger	57–60	NB Staouéli
Scoring by quarter: 18–11, 13–16, 16–16, 10–17
Pts: Ahmed Boutiba 25; Rebs: Redouane Mimouni, Mehdi Zaim 8 Asts: Four players 2		Pts: Mohamed Amine Bensalah 21; Rebs: Mohamed Boussad 9 Asts: Mohamed Boussad 4
NB Staouéli wins series, 2–0

Salle OMS Abdelaziz Ben Tifour, Hydra
Attendance: 500
Referees: Si Youcef Sofiane, Hammada Sofiane, Meheni Habib

==== (2) WO Boufarik vs. (3) CS Tlemcen ====
WO Boufarik forced 19 CS Tlemcen turnovers. The former international point guard Tarek Hamdani stepped up and scored 16 points, 5 assists and 5 steals for the winners and guard Louai Chebel chipped in 12 points and 6 rebounds. At the losing side Farouk Hadjadj-Aoul responded with 7 points, 13 rebounds and 8 assists and Mustapha Braik scored 19 points and 6 steals.

April 21, 2026
18:00

Boxscore

WO Boufarik	62–55	CS Tlemcen
Scoring by quarter: 15–19, 15–14, 16–10, 16–12
Pts: Tarek Hamdani 16; Rebs: Rabah Zitoun 10; Asts: Tarek Hamdani 5		Pts: Mustapha Braik 19; Rebs: Farouk Hadjadj-Aoul 13; Asts: Farouk Hadjadj-Aoul 8
WO Boufarik leads series, 1–0

Salle Moussa Cheraf, Boufarik
Attendance: 2000
Referees: Si Youcef Sofiane, Hamid Kaddour, Bennani Anis

April 24, 2026
18:00

Boxscore

CS Tlemcen	73–80	WO Boufarik
Scoring by quarter: 18–19, 14–24, 21–19, 20–18
Pts: Abakar Outman Oumar 19; Rebs: Abakar Outman Oumar 12; Asts: Mustapha Braik 9		Pts: Kadour Mitidji, Mohamed Akram Sahraoui 17; Rebs: Rabah Zitoun 6 Asts: Tarek Hamdani 8
WO Boufarik wins series, 2–0

Salle OMS Kara Zaitri Imama, Tlemcen
Attendance: 500
Referees: Hamid Kaddour, Bouarifi Mohamed, Harrache Mouad

=== Finals ===
At the end of these games, the winning teams will play two (2) Final matches, during which the Champion of Algeria for the 2024–25 sports season will be determined according to the FIBA system: If the score is tied at the end of the first game, no overtime will be played. (Article D.6.2 and Official FIBA Regulations). If the total score of the two games is tied at the end of the second game, the second game will continue with as many 5-minute overtimes as necessary to determine a winner. (Article D.6.3 and Official FIBA Regulations).

==== First leg ====
June 4, 2026
18:00

Boxscore

NB Staouéli	82–64	WO Boufarik
Scoring by quarter: 25–18, 19–19, 19–13, 19–14
Pts: Anis Mohamed Fedala 17; Rebs: Zakaria Maatoub 11; Asts: Merouane Yahya, Abderraouf Benrighi 3		Pts: Mohamed Akram Sahraoui 17; Rebs: Djamel Achache 8 Asts: Tarek Hamdani 6
NB Staouéli leads series, 1–0

La Coupole d'Alger Arena, Dély Ibrahim, Algiers
Attendance: 2501
Referees: Si Youcef Sofiane, Hammada Sofia, Latibi Wahid

==== Second leg ====
TV1, TV2

June 5, 2026
16:30

Boxscore

WO Boufarik	87–79	NB Staouéli
Scoring by quarter: 22–20, 30–15, 17–18, 18–26
Pts: Kadour Mitidji 18; Rebs: Djamel Achache 10; Asts: Tarek Hamdani 11		Pts: Hichem Dekakene 27; Rebs: Hichem Dekakene 8 Asts: Merouane Yahya 4
Series tied, 1–1

La Coupole d'Alger Arena, Dély Ibrahim, Algiers
Attendance: 1500
Referees: Si Youcef Sofiane, Bennani Anis, Hammada Sofiane

==== Decisive ====
TV2

June 6, 2026
16:30

Boxscore

NB Staouéli	66–70	WO Boufarik
Scoring by quarter: 18–16, 17–21, 19–27, 12–6
Pts: Hichem Dekakene 22; Rebs: Mohamed Amine Bensalah 14; Asts: Anis Mohamed Fedala 5		Pts: Tarek Hamdani, Kadour Mitidji 13; Rebs: Djamel Achache 9 Asts: Kadour Mitidji 5
WO Boufarik wins series, 2–1

La Coupole d'Alger Arena, Dély Ibrahim, Algiers
Attendance: 2 500
Referees: Si Youcef Sofiane, Hammada Sofiane, Latibi Wahid

== Play-down ==
=== Playdown table ===
Pos	Team	Pld	W	L	GF	GA	GD	Pts	
1	NA Hussein Dey	3	2	1	211	203	+8	5	
2	US Sétif	3	2	1	206	198	+8	5	
3	M Ouled Chebel	3	2	1	212	212	0	5	Relegation to National 1
4	TRA Draria	3	0	3	210	0	+210	3	Relegation to National 1

First match(es) will be played: April 11, 2026. Source: FABB

April 9, 2026 Round 1	TRA Draria	69–76	NA Hussein Dey	Sétif
16:00	Scoring by quarter: 26–13, 11–27, 9–20, 23–16
	Pts: Nabil Nouari 23; Rebs: Faycal Zerouk Belkhodja 11; Asts: Nabil Gueddoudj, Belkhodja 3	Boxscore	Pts: Farouk Bellakhdar 17; Rebs: Rayan Hamdi 13; Asts: Mounir Djellili 8	Arena: Salle 8 Mai 1945; Attendance: 100; Referees: Kahalou Adel, Bennani Anis, Hammada Sofiane

April 9, 2026 Round 1	US Sétif	70–64	M Ouled Chebel	Sétif
18:00	Scoring by quarter: 18–13, 14–14, 18–14, 20–23
	Pts: Anis Azzouz 22; Rebs: Arsène Mutomb Mbav 17; Asts: Yacine Kalkoul 8	Boxscore	Pts: Abdelwaheb Bounaas 17; Rebs: Diakite Demba 13; Asts: Three players 4	Arena: Salle 8 Mai 1945; Attendance: 400; Referees: Si Youcef Sofiane, Larouci Adlene, Fritah Anis

April 10, 2026 Round 2	NA Hussein Dey	62–66	M Ouled Chebel	Sétif
16:00	Scoring by quarter: 12–25, 16–8, 23–6, 11–17
	Pts: Mounir Djellili 17; Rebs: Nabil Saidi 12; Asts: Nabil Saidi, Mounir Djellili 5	Boxscore	Pts: Abdelmalek Kaci 26; Rebs: Diakite Demba 10; Asts: Abdelwaheb Bounaas, Abdelnacer Labadi 5	Arena: Salle 8 Mai 1945; Attendance: 400; Referees: Si Youcef Sofiane, Larouci Adlene, Fouchene Abderrezak

April 10, 2026 Round 2	US Sétif	68–61	TRA Draria	Sétif
18:00	Scoring by quarter: 16–23, 18–16, 16–11, 18–11
	Pts: Arsène Mutomb Mbav 23; Rebs: Anis Azzouz 15; Asts: Mohamed Rouabah, Yacine Kalkoul 4	Boxscore	Pts: Nabil Nouari, Abdellah Hamdini 15; Rebs: Omar Belliche 9 Asts: Nabil Gueddoudj 5	Arena: Salle 8 Mai 1945; Attendance: 600; Referees: Si Youcef Sofiane, Larouci Adlene, Hamada Sofiane

April 11, 2026 Round 3	US Sétif	68–73(OT)	NA Hussein Dey	Sétif
14:00	Scoring by quarter: 21–21, 19–15, 11–15, 12–12, Overtime: 5–10
	Pts: Arsène Mutomb Mbav 20; Rebs: Anis Azzouz 15; Asts: Yacine Kalkoul 6	Boxscore	Pts: Nabil Saidi 25; Rebs: Abderraouf Bellakhdar 16; Asts: Farouk Bellakhdar 6	Arena: Salle 8 Mai 1945; Attendance: 600; Referees: Kahalou Adel, Hammada Sofiane, Fritah Mohamed Anis

April 11, 2026 Round 3	TRA Draria	80–82	M Ouled Chebel	Sétif
16:00	Scoring by quarter: 24–23, 30–28, 22–28, 4–3
	Pts: Abderafaa Damerdji 29; Rebs: Mounir Benamara 16; Asts: Mounir Benamara 6	Boxscore	Pts: Slimane Boumedfa 18; Rebs: Slimane Boumedfa 20; Asts: Slimane Boumedfa 10	Arena: Salle 8 Mai 1945; Attendance: 700; Referees: Si Youcef Sofiane, Larouci Adlene, Bennani Anis
