= US Sétif =

Algerian basketball team

Union sportif Sétifienne
- Leagues: Super Division
- Founded: 2002
- Arena: Salle 8 Mai 1945
- Capacity: 1,500
- Location: Sétif, Algeria
- Team colors
- Team manager: Abdesslem Djeroudi

US Sétif is an Algerian basketball club based in Sétif. The club competes in national competitions, including the Super Division and the Algerian Basketball Cup. The club has reached several national finals but has yet to claim a major title. US Sétif was the runner-up in the Super Division in 2014–15 and finished as runners-up in the Algerian Basketball Cup three times consecutively in 2016, 2017, and 2018.

== History ==
=== From Promotion to Contenders ===
In 2011, US Sétif was promoted to the Excellence division after finishing ahead of MS Cherchel, USM Blida, and COB Oran during the playoff tournament held from June 1 to 4 in Algiers. The young Sétifian team won almost all their matches throughout the season, confirming their regional dominance in basketball. This was achieved by a young team, the club’s management, coaches, players, and supporters.

On May 30, 2015, US Sétif narrowly missed out on the Algerian championship title after a very close defeat (68–66) against GS Pétroliers in the decisive game of the Super Division A finals, held in Sétif. After losing the first leg in Algiers (75–64), US Sétif showed great character by bouncing back in the second game at home to level the series. This forced a decisive third match (“belle”), where the Sétifian side fought hard but fell just short in a tightly contested encounter. Despite the defeat, US Sétif delivered a strong performance throughout the finals, confirming their competitiveness at the highest level of Algerian basketball.

=== US Sétif vs GS Pétroliers: Finals Battles and Missed Titles ===
On July 5, 2017, US Sétif failed to claim the Algerian Basketball Cup after losing the final to GS Pétroliers (62–52) at the Salle Tahar Belakhdarin Cheraga. In this remake of the 2016 final, US Sétif were unable to end the dominance of the GSP, who secured their 7th consecutive Algerian Basketball Cup and further extended their record. Despite their determination, the Sétifian side struggled against a strong opponent coached by Nicolas Meistelman, who imposed control from the very start and won all four quarters. Although defeated, US Sétif once again reached a major final, confirming their status as one of the top teams in Algerian basketball during that period.

US Sétif once again fell short in the Algerian Cup final, losing to GS Pétroliers with a score of 75–56 at the Hacène Harcha Arena. This marked the third consecutive final between the two teams, but US Sétif struggled against a dominant GSP side that built an early lead and maintained control throughout the game. The Sétifians had difficulty offensively, particularly from long range, which limited their chances of staying close on the scoreboard. Despite trailing by a significant margin, US Sétif showed some reaction in the final quarter, reducing the gap to eight points (55–47). However, their efforts were not enough to overturn the situation, as the experience of the GSP players allowed them to pull away again and secure victory. Although defeated, reaching another final confirmed US Sétif’s consistency at the highest level, even if they were repeatedly denied silverware by a dominant GSP team during that period.

=== Return to the Super Division ===
In May 2025, US Sétif returned to the Super Division following the accession tournament held in Bordj Bou Arréridj. The Sétif side finished in second place with a total of 5 points, just behind CRB Dar Beida, who achieved a perfect run. Behind them, US Biskra and US Sidi Amar failed to secure promotion, but still managed to retain their places in Nationale I.

== Roster (Men) ==
=== Super Division roster ===
Note: Flags indicate national team eligibility at FIBA-sanctioned events. Players may hold other non-FIBA nationalities not displayed.

US Sétif roster
Players
Coaches

Pos.	No.	Nat.	Name	Ht.	Wt.	Age
SF	1	(Algeria)	Bouzidi, Aymen Habib	1.84 m (6 ft 0 in)	70 kg (154 lb)	35 – 11 January 1991
PF	4	(Algeria)	Kara, Salah
SG	5	(Algeria)	Benchouche, Makram	1.88 m (6 ft 2 in)	83 kg (183 lb)	24 – 12 January 2002
PG	6	(Algeria)	Kalkoul, Yacine	1.78 m (5 ft 10 in)	77 kg (170 lb)	35 – 27 October 1990
PF	7	(Algeria)	Haichour, Younes Dhia Eddine	1.90 m (6 ft 3 in)	90 kg (198 lb)	24 – 11 October 2001
PF	8	(Algeria)	Bendada, Aymen Atallah	1.93 m (6 ft 4 in)	83 kg (183 lb)	25 – 16 November 2000
PG	9	(Algeria)	Rouabah, Mohamed Idris	1.78 m (5 ft 10 in)	74 kg (163 lb)	26 – 2 August 1999
PF	10	(Algeria)	Souici, Ryadh Ilyas	1.92 m (6 ft 4 in)	80 kg (176 lb)	30 – 1 March 1996
G	12	(Algeria)	Daifallah, Salim	1.98 m (6 ft 6 in)	114 kg (251 lb)	29 – 20 April 1997
SF	12	(Algeria)	Gadaoui, Ouail Sofiane	1.83 m (6 ft 0 in)	86 kg (190 lb)	25 – 10 February 2001
G	13	(Algeria)	Azzouz, Anis	1.98 m (6 ft 6 in)	95 kg (209 lb)	26 – 28 March 2000
G	14	(Algeria)	Babouri, Issam	1.95 m (6 ft 5 in)	92 kg (203 lb)	22 – 8 September 2003
F/C	14	(Democratic Republic of the Congo)	Mbav, Arsène Mutomb	2.06 m (6 ft 9 in)	90 kg (198 lb)	31 – 9 August 1994
F	16	(Algeria)	Faidia, Abderaouf	1.88 m (6 ft 2 in)	90 kg (198 lb)	34 – 4 December 1991

Head coach

- (Algeria) Abdesslem Djeroudi

Assistant coach(es)

Legend

- (C) Team captain
- (I) Import player
- Injured

- Roster
Updated: September 13, 2025

== Statistics ==
=== Season by season ===
Season	Regular season						Playoffs	Algerian Cup	African competitions
Season	Division	Pos	Pts	P	W	L	Playoffs	Algerian Cup	African competitions
2011–12	Super Division A	11th	42	30	12	18	—N/a	Round of 32	
2012–13	Super Division A	3rd	31	18	13	5	4th	Round of 32	
2013–14	Super Division A	4th	29	18	11	7	5th	Semi-finals	
2014–15	Super Division A	2nd	44	24	19	7	Runner-up	?	
2015–16	Super Division A	3rd	46	26	20	6	3rd	Runner-up	
2016–17	Super Division A	2nd	20	12	8	4	4th	Runner-up	
2017–18	National 1	3rd	52	30	23	7	4th	Runner-up	
2018–19	National 1		0	0	0	0			
2019–20	National 1	Canceled (Note: On March 15, 2020, the Ministry of Youth and Sports decided to stop the season due to the COVID-19 pandemic in Algeria.)							
2020–21	National 1	Canceled							
2021–22	Super Division							Quarter-finals (Note: The Algerian Basketball Federation (FABB) has decided, exceptionally, to cancel the Algerian Cup for the 2021–22 season and replace it with a Coupe fédérale which only concerns the 20 teams in the Super Division.)	
2022–23	Super Division								
2023–24	Super Division	10th	43	30	13	17	Not qualify	Round of 16	
2024–25	National 1						2nd	Round of 16	
2025–26	Super Division	11th	35	26	9	17	Not qualify	Round of 16	

== Trophies ==
- Algerian Basketball Championship: 0

Runner-up (1): 2014–15

- Algerian Basketball Cup: 0

Runner-up (3): 2016, 2017, 2018
