= 2013–14 Algerian Basketball Championship =

ABC Super Division 2014–15
- League: ABC Super Division
- Sport: Basketball
- Duration: Sep 27, 2013 – Feb ?, 2014; Feb 17 –May 17, 2018 (Playoffs); May 27–30, 2018 (Finals)
- Teams: 20
- Season champions: GS Pétroliers
- League champions: GS Pétroliers

Algerian Basketball Championship seasons
- ← 2013 2015 →

The 2013–14 Super Division (52nd edition), Algeria's top tier basketball club competition, ran from September 12, 2013 through May 31, 2014.

== ABC Super Division Participants (2013–14 Season) ==
Locations of teams for the 2013–14 Algerian Basketball Championship

Promoted from 2nd Division

Team	Home	Venue
CSMBB Ouargla	Ouargla	
CRB Dar Beida	Dar El Beida	Salle de Dar El Beïda
AB Skikda	Skikda	
MS Cherchell	Cherchell	
COBB Oran	Oran	Hamou Boutlélis Sports Palace
MT El Eulma	El Eulma	
OMB Bel Abbés	Sidi Bel Abbès	
CRM Birkhadem	Birkhadem	
GS Pétroliers	Algiers	
IRB Bordj Bou Arreridj	Bordj Bou Arréridj	
NB Staoueli	Staoueli	Salle omnisports de Staouéli
NA Hussein Dey	Algiers	
Olympique Batna	Batna	OPOW de Batna
OMS Miliana	Miliana	
CSM Constantine	Constantine	
ASM Blida	Blida	Salle Hocine Chalane
USM Alger	Algiers	Rais Hamidou Arena
USM Blida	Blida	Salle Hocine Chalane
US Sétif	Sétif	Salle 8 Mai 1945
WA Boufarik	Boufarik	Salle Moussa-Charef

== Regular season (September 27, 2013 - February 2014) ==
=== Niveau A ===
	CRD	CSC	GSP	IRA	NAH	NBS	OBA	USB	USS	WAB	Rec.
CRB Dar Beida		69–66	62–60	72–61	20–00	77–58	77–44	68–58	76–72	54–52	9–0
CSM Constantine	70–68		58–67	81–75	78–75	91–61	79–68	20–00	66–67	81–56	7–2
GS Pétroliers	93–72	67–61		85–69	80–60	72–39	73–46	86–65	79–64	72–49	9–0
IRB Bordj Bou Arreridj	86–76	62–63	60–74		73–71	85–74	61–53	77–70	76–82	68–48	6–3
NA Hussein Dey	68–59	58–70	76–94	64–61		79–88	73–56	71–69	79–88	68–53	5–4
NB Staoueli	54–67	62–68	00–20	68–81	74–75		59–51	81–66	78–79	59–54	3–6
Olympique Batna	63–66	48–54	61–64	67–65	67–47	75–55		73–65	20–00	52–59	5–4
USM Blida	54–71	48–47	60–69	64–69	65–67	69–66	82–73		78–82	00–20	3–6
US Sétif	56–69	55–72	76–82	98–78	78–67	89–55	93–73	86–74		80–68	6–3
WA Boufarik	41–69	68–71	00–20	57–63	00–20	79–67	71–81	53–47	72–87		2–7
Record	4–5	3–6	1–8	6–3	6–3	8–1	8–1	9–0	3–6	7–2	

- Note: Small number and number in brackets indicate round number and leg, respectively
  Next scheduled games

=== Regular season standings ===
Updated as of 13 October 2017.

==== Niveau A ====
Pos	Team	Pld	W	L	GF	GA	GDIF	Pts
1	GS Pétroliers	18	17	1	1219	978	241	35
2	CRB Dar El Beida	18	14	4	1173	1056	117	32
3	CSM Constantine	18	13	5	1177	1074	103	31
4	US Sétif	18	11	7	1332	1243	89	29
5	IRB Bordj Bou Arreridj	18	9	9	1133	1127	6	27
6	NA Hussein Dey	18	9	9	1270	1257	13	27
7	Olympique Batna	18	5	13	1042	1143	-101	23
8	WA Boufarik	18	4	14	881	1048	-167	22
9	NB Staoueli	18	3	15	1071	1263	-192	21
10	USM Blida	18	3	15	1032	1141	-109	21

Advance to play-offs

==== Niveau B ====
Pos	Team	Pld	W	L	GF	GA	GDIF	Pts
1	ASM Blida	16	31	3				29
2	AB Skikda	16	11	5				27
3	CSMBB Ouargla	16	10	6				26
4	OMS Miliana	16	9	7				25
5	COBB Oran	16	7	9				23
6	USM Alger	16	7	9				23
7	MT El Eulma	16	6	10				22
8	MS Cherchell	16	6	10				22
9	OMB Bel Abbés	16	2	14				19

Advance to play-offs

== Play-offs (February 21-May 17, 2014) ==
Fri, 21 February 2014
CSM Constantine	68 : 56	US Sétif
GS Pétroliers	71 : 73	IRB Bordj Bou Arreridj
NA Hussein Dey	65 : 94	CRB Dar Beida
Sat, 22 February 2014
CSM Constantine	69 : 55	NA Hussein Dey
GS Pétroliers	64 : 63	CRB Dar Beida
US Sétif	74 : 73	IRB Bordj Bou Arreridj
Fri, 28 February 2014
CSM Constantine	62 : 75	GS Pétroliers
CRB Dar Beida	71 : 63	IRB Bordj Bou Arreridj
US Sétif	76 : 69	NA Hussein Dey
Sat, 1 March 2014
GS Pétroliers	71 : 59	US Sétif
NA Hussein Dey	66 : 68	IRB Bordj Bou Arreridj
CRB Dar Beida	64 : 63	CSM Constantine
Thu, 8 May 2014
IRB Bordj Bou Arreridj	60 : 69	CSM Constantine
CRB Dar Beida	20 : 00	US Sétif
GS Pétroliers	82 : 71	NA Hussein Dey

Fri, 9 May 2014
IRB Bordj Bou Arreridj	76 : 87	GS Pétroliers
NA Hussein Dey	73 : 74	CRB Dar Beida
US Sétif	00 : 20	CSM Constantine
Sat, 10 May 2014
US Sétif	00 : 20	IRB Bordj Bou Arreridj
CSM Constantine	60 : 55	NA Hussein Dey
CRB Dar Beida	67 : 65	GS Pétroliers
Thu, 15 May 2014
GS Pétroliers	65 : 56	CSM Constantine
CRB Dar Beida	62 : 60	IRB Bordj Bou Arreridj
NA Hussein Dey	63 : 70	US Sétif
Fri, 16 May 2014
NA Hussein Dey	65 : 73	IRB Bordj Bou Arreridj
CRB Dar Beida	85 : 83	CSM Constantine
GS Pétroliers	91 : 65	US Sétif
Sat, 17 May 2014
IRB Bordj Bou Arreridj	60 : 66	CSM Constantine
CRB Dar Beida	82 : 76	US Sétif
GS Pétroliers	76 : 71	NA Hussein Dey

Pos	Team	Pld	W	L	GF	GA	GDIF	Pts
1	CRB Dar Beida	10	9	1	682	612	70	19
2	GS Pétroliers	10	8	2	747	663	84	18
3	CSM Constantine	10	6	4	616	575	41	16
4	IRB Bordj Bou Arreridj	10	4	6	626	631	-5	14
5	US Sétif	10	3	7	476	577	-101	10*
6	NA Hussein Dey	10	0	10	653	742	-89	10

- 3 loss by default (no point awarded)

Advance to championship Final

== Championship final ==
The, 27 May 2014
17:30 CET UTC+1

Report

GS Pétroliers	91–73	CRB Dar Beida
Scoring by quarter: -, -, -, -
1–0

Salle Abdelaziz Ben Tifour, Hydra
Referees: , ,

Fri, 30 May 2017
17:30 CET UTC+1

Report

CRB Dar Beida	54–64	GS Pétroliers
Scoring by quarter: 17-14, 12-22, 20-12, 5-16
0–2

Salle de Dar El Beïda, Dar El Beïda
Referees: , ,

== Team champions ==
2013–14 Algerian Basketball Championship winner

Groupement sportif des pétroliers
16th title.

Team roster: Touhami Ghezzoul, Nabil Saidi, Abderrahmane Mostefai, (Syria) Nour Diarbakrly, Walid Hamma, Hocine Gaham, Abdesslem Dekkiche, Mohamed Seddik Touati, Abdallah Hamdini, Mustapha Adrar, Faycal Belkhodja, Mounir Benzegala
Head coach: (United States) Sean Wallen
