= Algerian Women's Basketball Cup =

- Sport: Basketball
- First season: 1969
- Country: Algeria
- Continent: FIBA Africa (Africa)
- Most recent champion: Hussein Dey Marines (2025)
- Most titles: OC Alger (12 titles)
- Website: http://www.fabb.org.dz

The Algerian Women's Basketball Cup is an elimination basketball tournament for women held annually in Algeria. It is the second most important national title in Algerian women's basketball after the Algerian Women's Basketball Championship. It started in 1982.

== Finals ==
Below the finals of the competition since the first edition of 1968–69.

Year	Winners	Score	Runners-up	Venue
1969-70	RAMA Mouradia	–		
1970-71	Not played			
1971-72	Not played			
1972-73	JSF Oran	–		
1973-74	CRM Birkhadem	–		
1974-75	CRM Birkhadem	–		
1975-76	RAMA Mouradia	–		
1976-77	DNC Constantine	–		
1977-78	Not played			
1978-79	USM Alger	–		
1979-80	Not played			
1980-81	NIAD Alger	–		
1981-82	Not played			
1982-83	NIAD Alger	–		
1983-84	IRB Alger	52 – 45	USK Alger	Ben Aknoun Women's Sports Complex Hall, Algiers
1984-85	NIAD Alger	70 – 26	MP Alger	Hacène Harcha Arena, Algiers
1985-86	USK Alger	60 – 43	IRB Alger	Hacène Harcha Arena, Algiers
1986-87	ASUC EPAU El Harrach	–	USK Alger	
1987-88	ASUC EPAU El Harrach	–	NA Hussein Dey	Hacène Harcha Arena, Algiers
1988-89	NA Hussein Dey	–		
1989-90	NA Hussein Dey	59 – 55	USM Alger	Hacène Harcha Arena, Algiers
1990-91	NA Hussein Dey	74 – 52	USM Alger	Hacène Harcha Arena, Algiers
1991-92	SR Annaba	51 – 50	NA Hussein Dey	Hacène Harcha Arena, Algiers
1992-93	SR Annaba	50 – 46	USM Alger	Hacène Harcha Arena, Algiers
1993-94	ASUC EPAU El Harrach	75 – 72	USM Alger	Hacène Harcha Arena, Algiers
1994-95	ASUC EPAU El Harrach	56 – 49	MC Alger	Hacène Harcha Arena, Algiers
1995-96	OC Alger	69 – 66	NA Hussein Dey	Hacène Harcha Arena, Algiers
1996-97	OC Alger	73 – 56	NA Hussein Dey	Hacène Harcha Arena, Algiers
1997-98	OC Alger	77 – 46	ASUC EPAU El Harrach	Hacène Harcha Arena, Algiers
1998-99	OC Alger	73 – 45	EDR Alger	Hacène Harcha Arena, Algiers
1999-00	OC Alger	68 – 37	RIJ Alger	Hacène Harcha Arena, Algiers
2000-01	OC Alger	63 – 51	MC Alger	Abdelkader Kessai Hall, Rouiba
2001-02	OC Alger	–		
2002-03	OC Alger	–		
2003-04	OC Alger	–		
2004-05	OC Alger	–		
2005-06	AS PTT Alger	–		
2006-07	OC Alger	–		
2007-08	AS PTT Alger	67 – 41	MC Alger	
2008-09	AS PTT Alger	90 – 83	GS Pétroliers	
2009-10	AS PTT Alger	67 – 66	GS Pétroliers	
2010-11	GS Pétroliers	61 – 55	CR Hussein Dey	Hacène Harcha Arena, Algiers
2011-12	GS Pétroliers	75 – 65	OC Alger	Hacène Harcha Arena, Algiers
2012-13	GS Pétroliers	63 – 58	OC Alger	Hacène Harcha Arena, Algiers
2013-14	OC Alger	75 – 47	USA Batna	Hacène Harcha Arena, Algiers
2014-15	GS Pétroliers	73 – 55	OC Alger	Salle Omnisports, Staoueli
2015-16	Hussein Dey Marines	54 – 41	OC Alger	Hacène Harcha Arena, Algiers
2016-17	Hussein Dey Marines	76 – 50	JF Kouba	Tahar Belakhdar Arena, Chéraga
2017-18	GS Pétroliers	74 – 50	Hussein Dey Marines	Hacène Harcha Arena, Algiers
2018-19	Hussein Dey Marines	71 – 70	GS Pétroliers	La Coupole, Algiers
2019-20	Not played due to the COVID-19 pandemic in Algeria			
2020-21	Not played due to the COVID-19 pandemic in Algeria			
2021-22	MC Alger	74 – 47	Hussein Dey Marines	Hacène Harcha Arena, Algiers
2022-23	MC Alger	45 – 38	GS Cosider	Salle Omnisports, Staoueli
2023-24	GS Cosider	63 – 53	MC Alger	Abdelaziz Bentifour Arena, Hydra
2024-25	Hussein Dey Marines	45 – 39	USM Alger	La Coupole, Algiers

Rq
OC Alger (ex. IRB Alger)

== Most successful clubs ==
Rank	Club	Champions	Runners-up	Winning seasons
1	OC Alger	12		1984, 1996, 1997, 1998, 1999, 2000, 2001, 2002, 2003, 2004, 2005, 2014
2	MC Alger	7		2011, 2012, 2013, 2015, 2018, 2022, 2023
3	ASUC EPAU El Harrach	4		1987, 1988, 1994, 1995
3	AS PTT Alger	4		2006, 2008, 2009, 2010
3	Hussein Dey Marines	4		2016, 2017, 2019, 2025
6	NIAD Alger	3		1981, 1983, 1985
6	NA Hussein Dey	3		1989, 1990, 1991
8	RAM El Mouradia	2		1970, 1976
8	CRM Birkhadem	2		1974, 1975
8	USM Alger	2		1979, 1986
8	SR Annaba	2		1992, 1993
12	JSF Oran	1		1973
12	DNC Constantine	1		1977
12	GS Cosider	1		2024

== Final 2026 ==
TV6

May 16, 2026
14:45

Boxscore

MC Alger	57–63	USM Alger
Scoring by quarter: 14–15, 19–11, 14–21, 10–16
Pts: Soulef Malkia 12; Rebs: Soulef Malkia 15; Asts: Soulef Malkia, Lydia Hiouani 4		Pts: Hadjer Yahou, Neyla Reguig 18; Rebs: Neyla Reguig 11; Asts: Radia Fantazi 4

La Coupole d'Alger Arena, Dély Ibrahim, Algiers
Attendance: 2500
Referees: Zenagui Nadjet, Ainouz Celya, Zaaza Choubeyla

== See also ==
- Algerian Women's Basketball Championship
- Algerian Basketball Cup
