= 2012–13 Algerian Basketball Championship =

ABC Super Division 2012–13
- League: ABC Super Division
- Sport: Basketball
- Duration: Oct 19, 2012 – May 4, 2013
- Teams: 20
- Season champions: CSM Constantine

Algerian Basketball Championship seasons
- ← 2012 2014 →

The 2012–13 Super Division (51st edition), Algeria's top tier basketball club competition, ran from October 19, 2012, through May 4, 2013. We recall that the Super Division is composed this season of twenty clubs including four new ones promoted (USM Alger, CRM Birkhadem, CSMBB Ouargla, COBB Oran). The clubs, divided into two groups A and B, will play a first phase of 18 days, after which the first four of each group will play the second phase, which will determine the 2012/2013 Super Division champion. The other clubs will defeat for the playdown in Super Division or the relegation. A first in national basketball, and which plebiscites an Eastern club that has gradually returned to the front of the scene over the previous three seasons. the new champion of Algeria, season 2012–13, is named CSM Constantine after winning against the champion in the last three seasons GS Pétroliers with a total of 2-1 led by US players Little Theo and Bryant. after this win, the team will be the representative of Algeria in the 2013 FIBA Africa Clubs Champions Cup for the first time in the history of Algerian basketball.

== ABC Super Division Participants (2012–13 Season) ==
Locations of teams for the 2012–13 Algerian Basketball Championship

Promoted from 2nd Division

Team	Home	Venue
CSMBB Ouargla	Ouargla	
CRB Dar Beida	Dar El Beida	Salle de Dar El Beïda
AB Skikda	Skikda	
GS Pétroliers	Algiers	
IRB Bordj Bou Arreridj	Bordj Bou Arréridj	
NB Staoueli	Staoueli	Salle omnisports de Staouéli
OMB Bel Abbès	Sidi Bel Abbès	
CRM Birkhadem	Birkhadem	
CRB Temouchent	Aïn Témouchent	
MS Cherchell	Cherchell	
COBB Oran	Oran	
AU Annaba	Annaba	
NA Hussein Dey	Algiers	
Olympique Batna	Batna	OPOW de Batna
CSM Constantine	Constantine	Salle Zouaghi de Constantine
ASM Blida	Blida	Salle Hocine Chalane
USM Alger	Algiers	Salle Rais Hamidou
USM Blida	Blida	Salle Hocine Chalane
US Sétif	Sétif	Salle 8 Mai 1945
WA Boufarik	Boufarik	Salle Moussa-Charef

== Regular season (October 19, 2012 - March 16, 2013) ==
=== Groupe A ===
	AUA	ASB	CRD	GSP	IRA	MSC	OBA	UAL	USB	COB	Rec.
AU Annaba		66–71	80–103	49–103	69–78	68–74	57–80	51–67	61–71	52–66	0–9
ASM Blida	00–20		63–72	52–86	72–69	73–48	56–57	58–50	64–60	68–52	5–4
CRB Dar Beida	92–55	78–40		71–74	87–60	92–56	97–70	88–36	80–66	81–47	8–1
GS Pétroliers	82–40	89–52	67–79		96–51	00–20	84–63	73–45	91–60	125–53	7–2
IRB Bordj Bou Arreridj	85–75	68–69	66–80	56–93		55–52	90–79	70–59	57–72	81–72	5–4
MS Cherchell	74–71	62–60	52–63	37–85	48–60		60–58	82–87	58–63	66–71	3–6
Olympique Batna	69–54	60–53	67–73	59–91	77–79	62–61		66–54	84–75	76–71	6–3
USM Alger	69–54	65–56	65–80	60–98	68–62	51–64	71–67		58–70	89–84	5–4
USM Blida	83–53	67–59	85–78	59–75	64–48	58–59	83–55	72–73		73–66	6–3
COBB Oran	85–66	60–73	64–95	64–90	54–63	74–58	71–68	83–79	90–78		5–4
Record	1–8	3–6	8–1	9–0	4–5	4–5	2–7	3–6	4–5	2–7	

- Note: Small number and number in brackets indicate round number and leg, respectively
  Next scheduled games

=== Groupe B ===
	ABS	CSO	CRT	CRB	CSC	NBS	NAH	OMB	USS	WAB	Rec.
AB Skikda		82–72	95–53	91–73	65–84	72–80	88–57	82–60	89–75	47–55	6–3
CSMBB Ouargla	60–57		72–51	69–48	46–53	55–59	56–53	63–49	46–68	52–75	5–4
CRB Temouchent	53–67	67–71		81–82	58–93	69–84	59–75	82–70	58–64	67–74	1–8
CRM Birkhadem	56–59	50–57	66–58		69–83	70–83	65–67	59–45	60–75	68–81	2–7
CSM Constantine	79–57	93–48	99–71	111–88		105–87	105–66	117–67	110–75	85–58	9–0
NB Staoueli	60–53	50–53	76–59	70–59	71–76		73–80	69–65	70–63	72–69	6–3
NA Hussein Dey	68–57	63–70	84–66	87–68	58–65	54–60		64–77	61–73	59–70	3–6
OMB Bel Abbès	65–73	71–60	76–71	84–76	55–75	66–83	63–83		71–74	72–83	3–6
US Sétif	80–63	75–60	85–77	86–69	87–83	76–60	93–74	94–73		61–71	8–1
WA Boufarik	74–78	41–55	79–51	76–65	49–71	65–59	82–54	67–59	79–69		6–3
Record	4–5	5–4	0–9	1–8	8–1	6–3	4–5	1–8	5–4	7–2	

- Note: Small number and number in brackets indicate round number and leg, respectively
  Next scheduled games

== Regular season standings ==
=== Groupe A ===
Updated as of 13 October 2017.

Pos	Team	M	W	L	PF	PA	D	Pts
1	CRB Dar Beida	18	16	2	1489	1113	376	34
2	GS Pétroliers	18	16	2	1502	970	532	33*
3	USM Blida	18	10	8	1259	1209	50	28
4	IRB Bordj Bou Arreridj	18	9	9	1198	1286	-88	27
5	USM Alger	18	8	10	1146	1278	-132	26
6	Olympique Batna	18	8	10	1217	1280	-63	26
7	MS Cherchell	18	7	11	1031	1151	-120	25
8	COBB Oran	18	7	11	1227	1381	-154	25
9	ASM Blida	18	8	10	1039	1129	-90	25*
10	AU Annaba	18	1	17	1041	1352	-311	19

- 1 loss by default (no point awarded)

Advance to play-offs
Advance to play-out

=== Groupe B ===
Updated as of 13 October 2017

Pos	Team	M	W	L	PF	PA	D	Pts
1	CSM Constantine	18	17	1	2587	1175	1412	35
2	WA Boufarik	18	13	5	1248	1114	134	31
3	USM Sétif	18	13	5	1373	1274	99	31
4	NB Staoueli	18	12	6	1266	1209	57	30
5	AB Skikda	18	10	8	1275	1204	71	28
6	CSMBB Ouargla	18	10	8	1065	1105	-40	28
7	NA Hussein Dey	18	7	11	1207	1290	-83	25
8	OMB Bel Abbès	18	4	14	1188	1375	-187	22
9	CRM Birkhadem	18	3	15	1191	2363	-1172	21
10	CRB Temouchent	18	1	17	1151	1412	-261	19

- 1 loss by default (no point awarded)

Advance to play-offs
Advance to play-out

== Stage 2 play-offs (March 29 - April 13, 2018) ==
=== Results in detail ===
Fri, 29 March 2017
GS Pétroliers	77 : 56	NB Staoueli
CRB Dar Beida	73 : 52	WA Boufarik
USM Sétif	79 : 62	USM Blida
IRB Bordj Bou Arreridj	:	CSM Constantine
Sat, 30 March 2017
GS Pétroliers	75 : 68	CSM Constantine
CRB Dar Beida	92 : 52	NB Staoueli
USM Sétif	92 : 51	IRB Bordj Bou Arreridj
WA Boufarik	:	USM Blida
Fri, 5 April 2017
WA Boufarik	57 : 73	USM Sétif
NB Staoueli	85 : 68	USM Blida
CSM Constantine	84 : 67	CRB Dar Beida
GS Pétroliers	79 : 48	IRB Bordj Bou Arreridj
Sat, 6 April 2017
USM Sétif	69 : 72	GS Pétroliers
WA Boufarik	63 : 69	NB Staoueli
USM Blida	52 : 82	CSM Constantine
CRB Dar Beida	105 : 61	IRB Bordj Bou Arreridj

Thu, 11 April 2017
CSM Constantine	71 : 51	WA Boufarik
IRB Bordj Bou Arreridj	73 : 75	USM Blida
NB Staoueli	74 : 81	USM Sétif
GS Pétroliers	84 : 69	CRB Dar Beida
Fri, 12 April 2017
USM Sétif	:	CRB Dar Beida
WA Boufarik	:	IRB Bordj Bou Arreridj
NB Staoueli	:	CSM Constantine
USM Blida	:	GS Pétroliers
Sat, 13 April 2017
CSM Constantine	70 : 55	USM Sétif
CRB Dar Beida	77 : 71	USM Blida
IRB Bordj Bou Arreridj	69 : 65	NB Staoueli
GS Pétroliers	72 : 55	WA Boufarik

==== Play-off standings ====
Pos	Team	Pld	W	L	GF	GA	GDIF	Pts
1	GS Pétroliers	7	7	0	549	434	115	14
2	CSM Constantine	7	6	1	528	417	111	13
3	CRB Dar Beida	7	5	2	563	469	94	12
4	US Sétif	7	4	3	513	466	47	11
5	NB Staoueli	7	2	5	467	533	-66	9
6	USM Blida	7	2	5	461	542	-81	9
7	WA Boufarik	7	1	6	411	476	-65	8
8	IRB Bordj Bou Arreridj	7	1	6	408	563	-155	8

Advance to championship Final

== Playdown ==
=== Results ===
Fri, 20 April 2017.
AU Annaba	69 : 68	CRB Temouchent
CRM Birkhadem	43 : 63	ASM Blida
Sat, 21 April 2017.
ASM Blida	80 : 48	AU Annaba
CRB Temouchent	62 : 68	CRM Birkhadem
Sat, 2017
	:
	:

Sat, 2017
:
:
Fri, 2017
:
:
Sat, 2017
:
:

==== Playdown standings ====
Pos	Team	Pld	W	L	GF	GA	GDIF	Pts
1	ASM Blida	6	6	0	445	316	129	12
2	CRM Birkhadem	6	3	3	382	392	-10	9
3	AU Annaba	6	3	3	379	455	-76	9
4	CRB Temouchent	6	0	6	372	415	-43	6

Relegated to Nationale B

== Championship final ==
Tue, 30 April 2017
15:00 CET UTC+1

Report

CSM Constantine	63–54	GS Pétroliers
Scoring by quarter: -, -, -, -
1–0

Salle Zouaghi de Constantine, Constantine
Attendance: ???
Referees: , ,

Fri, 3 May 2017
17:00 CET UTC+1

Report

GS Pétroliers	85–64	CSM Constantine
Scoring by quarter: 22-17, 24-11, 24-24, 15-12
1–1

Hacène Harcha Arena, Algiers
Attendance: ???
Referees: , ,

Sat, 4 May 2017
17:00 CET UTC+1

Report

GS Pétroliers	54–65	CSM Constantine
Scoring by quarter: 7-17, 16-19, 21-14, 10-15
Pts: ? Rebs: ? Asts: ?		Pts: Mohamed Zerouali 20; Rebs: ? Asts: ?
1–2

Hacène Harcha Arena, Algiers
Attendance: 1000
Referees: , ,

== Team champions ==
2012–13 Algerian Basketball Championship winner

Club Sportif Mansourah Constantine
1st title

Team roster: Abderahmane Ziad, Abdelhalim Kaouane, Houcem Kabache, Sid Ali Ghrib, Ali Benhocine, Adel Yezza, Mohamed Zerouali, Mohamed Saadallah, Theo Little, Tarek Oukid, Mohamed Belhoul
Head coach: Said Didi
