= 2017–18 Algerian Basketball Championship =

ABC National 1 2017–18
- League: ABC National 1
- Sport: Basketball
- Duration: Oct 12, 2017 – May 1, 2018; May 11–26, 2018 (Playoffs); May 30–31, 2018 (Finals)
- Games: 30
- Teams: 16
- TV partner(s): EPTV Terrestre, Dzaïr TV

Regular season
- Top seed: GS Pétroliers

Playoffs
- {{{conf1}}} champions: GS Pétroliers

Finals
- Champions: GS Pétroliers
- Runners-up: NB Staouéli

Algerian Basketball Championship seasons
- ← 2017 2019 →

The 2017–18 Nationale 1 (56th edition), Algeria's top tier basketball club competition, ran from October 12, 2017 through May ?, 2018. for the 2017–18 season, which will start one week late due to the difficulties encountered by the clubs, both administratively and financially, we will find the usual leaders of the title race, namely GS Pétroliers, holder (Championship and Cup) and main favorite for his own succession, which will have NA Hussein-Dey (Runner-up), CRB Dar Beida and US Setif as main competitors.

Concerning the formula of competition, the leaders of the Fédération Algérienne de Basket-Ball (FABB) decided to regroup the 16 teams in a single pool in the first phase (against two groups the previous season) and will compete round-trip. At the end of this phase, the eight best teams in the standings will play the play-offs in three tournaments in the top three in the standings, the first two, after the play-offs, will animate the final of the championship which will be played in two games winners on neutral ground, another novelty for this season, the introduction of technical statistics for the National 1.

== Venues and locations ==
Locations of teams for the 2017–18 Algerian Basketball Championship

Promoted from 2nd Division

Team	Home city	Arena
CSMBB Ouargla	Ouargla	Salle Rouisset Ouargla
CRB Dar Beida	Dar El Beida	Salle de Dar El Beïda
CSC Gué de Constantine	Djasr Kasentina	
GS Pétroliers	Algiers	Salle Abdelaziz Ben Tifour
IRB Bordj Bou Arreridj	Bordj Bou Arréridj	Salle omnisports du 18 Février
NB Staoueli	Staoueli	Salle omnisports de Staouéli
NA Hussein Dey	Algiers	Salle Mohamed Handjer de Maquaria
Olympique Batna	Batna	OPOW de Batna
OS Bordj Bou Arréridj	Bordj Bou Arréridj	
OMS Miliana	Miliana	
Printemps Sportve d'El Eulma	El Eulma	
RC Constantine	Constantine	Salle Zouaghi de Constantine
USM Alger	Algiers	Rais Hamidou Arena
USM Blida	Blida	Hocine Chalane Arena
US Sétif	Sétif	8 Mai 1945 Arena
WA Boufarik	Boufarik	Moussa Charef Arena

== Regular season (October 12, 2017 - May 1, 2018) ==
	CBO	CRD	CSC	GSP	IRA	NBS	NAH	OBA	OSA	OMM	PSE	RCC	UAL	USB	USS	WAB	Rec.
CSMBB Ouargla		56–69; 21 Apr 14(2)	63–55; 23 Feb 7(2)	58–62; 13 Apr 12(2)	64–78; 6 Feb 5(2)	51–79; 27 Oct 4(1)	59–72; 5 Jan 13(1)	58–62; 17 Oct 2(1)	77–75; 2 Mar 8(2)	62–46; 30 Mar 10(2)	59–74; 27 Jan 3(2)	76–44; 12 Dec 9(1)	44–51; 23 Dec 11(1)	57–53; 1 Dec 6(1)	53–83; 13 Jan 15(1)	61–65; 20 Jan 1(2)	5–10
CRB Dar Beida	20–00; 9 Jan 14(1)		83–55; 17 Apr 13(2)	84–53; 16 Jan 3(1)	66–82; 6 Apr 11(2)	82–62; 16 Dec 10(1)	66–62; 2 Feb 4(2)	67–52; 8 Oct 8(1)	86–70; 26 Nov 5(1)	77–54; 13 Oct 1(1)	80–67; 9 Mar 9(2)	77–51; 27 Apr 15(2)	87–57; 23 Jan 2(2)	84–66; 29 Dec 12(1)	93–62; 1 Dec 6(1)	89–59; 23 Feb 7(2)	14–1
CSC Gué de Constantine	70–82; 5 Dec 7(1)	57–68; 5 Jan 13(1)		71–108; 20 Mar 11(1)	62–60; 27 Oct 4(1)	58–63; 27 Jan 3(2)	57–77; 13 Apr 12(2)	74–77; 20 Jan 1(2)	65–87; 9 Feb 6(2)	55–47; 12 Dec 9(1)	71–62; 17 Oct 2(1)	59–86; 2 Mar 8(2)	54–78; 30 Mar 10(2)	80–78; 6 Feb 5(2)	62–65; 21 Apr 14(2)	68–70; 13 Jan 15(1)	3–12
GS Pétroliers	56–24; 29 Dec 12(1)	78–70; 27 Jan 3(2)	89–45; 6 Apr 11(2)		96–89; 9 Mar 9(2)	90–59; 20 Feb 8(1)	95–70; 17 Oct 2(1)	121–62; 30 Jan 6(1)	96–47; 13 Oct 1(1)	124–55; 9 Jan 14(1)	75–52; 23 Feb 7(2)	20–00; 17 Apr 13(2)	76–58; 27 Apr 15(2)	96–71; 6 Mar 10(1)	88–75; 28 Nov 4(1)	56–60; 6 Feb 5(2)	14–1
IRB Bordj Bou Arreridj	79–44; 26 Nov 5(1)	84–72; 23 Dec 11(1)	110–86; 2 Feb 4(2)	83–100; 27 Feb 9(1)		69–62; 20 Jan 1(2)	76–80; 30 Mar 10(2)	80–67; 21 Apr 14(2)	80–81; 23 Jan 2(2)	99–43; 5 Dec 7(1)	80–53; 13 Jan 15(1)	79–61; 9 Feb 6(2)	76–65; 2 Mar 8(2)	72–82; 20 Oct 3(1)	70–73; 13 Apr 12(2)	78–74; 5 Jan 13(1)	10–5
NB Staoueli	62–59; 2 Feb 4(2)	64–77; 30 Mar 10(2)	57–55; 21 Oct 3(1)	65–79; 2 Mar 8(2)	76–80; 12 Oct 1(1)		77–73; 12 Dec 9(1)	77–65; 5 Jan 13(1)	62–48; 13 Jan 15(1)	72–55; 9 Feb 6(2)	69–73; 21 Apr 14(2)	65–55; 26 Nov 5(1)	47–48; 5 Dec 7(1)	81–70; 23 Jan 2(2)	56–64; 22 Dec 11(1)	56–52; 13 Apr 12(2)	9–6
NA Hussein Dey	20–00; 17 Apr 13(2)	61–73; 26 Oct 4(1)	85–61; 30 Dec 12(1)	82–67; 23 Jan 2(2)	54–81; 15 Dec 10(1)	65–74; 24 Mar 9(2)		67–60; 23 Feb 7(2)	82–54; 20 Oct 3(1)	77–66; 27 Apr 15(2)	87–70; 8 Oct 8(1)	70–62; 20 Mar 14(1)	70–65; 13 Oct 1(1)	83–85; 6 Apr 11(2)	71–81; 6 Feb 5(2)	89–91; 2 Dec 6(1)	10–5
Olympique Batna	78–56; 23 Jan 2(2)	69–66; 2 Mar 8(2)	73–85; 13 Oct 1(1)	64–81; 9 Feb 6(2)	66–79; 9 Jan 14(1)	65–66; 17 Apr 13(2)	78–82; 5 Dec 7(1)		68–88; 22 Dec 11(1)	80–69; 2 Feb 4(2)	65–59; 29 Dec 12(1)	63–46; 20 Oct 3(1)	59–63; 26 Nov 5(1)	74–51; 27 Apr 15(2)	69–54; 20 Mar 9(1)	58–62; 30 Mar 10(2)	7–8
OS Bordj Bou Arréridj	86–74; 16 Jan 8(1)	73–79; 6 Feb 5(2)	74–64; 1 Dec 6(1)	56–61; 20 Jan 1(2)	60–75; 17 Oct 2(1)	72–66; 27 Apr 15(2)	64–54; 27 Jan 3(2)	71–51; 6 Apr 11(2)		64–44; 29 Dec 12(1)	60–55; 17 Apr 13(2)	70–62; 16 Dec 10(1)	75–64; 9 Jan 14(1)	67–68; 27 Oct 4(1)	55–65; 23 Feb 7(2)	66–59; 9 Mar 9(2)	10–5
OMS Miliana	71–78; 16 Dec 10(1)	49–83; 20 Jan 1(2)	91–71; 9 Mar 9(2)	57–91; 21 Apr 14(2)	59–86; 23 Feb 7(2)	48–68; 1 Dec 6(1)	59–68; 13 Jan 15(1)	69–73; 27 Oct 4(1)	67–78; 13 Apr 12(2)		70–79; 6 Feb 5(2)	55–61; 6 Apr 11(2)	66–78; 5 Jan 13(1)	57–78; 8 Oct 8(1)	42–68; 17 Oct 2(1)	54–66; 27 Jan 3(2)	1–14
PS El Eulma	82–70; 20 Oct 3(1)	70–91; 12 Dec 9(1)	73–51; 23 Jan 2(2)	68–89; 13 Feb 7(1)	66–78; 27 Apr 15(2)	66–67; 9 Jan 14(1)	71–79; 2 Mar 8(2)	78–74; 24 Apr 12(2)	66–70; 5 Jan 13(1)	64–47; 26 Nov 5(1)		59–45; 3 Feb 4(2)	52–59; 9 Feb 6(2)	61–75; 13 Oct 1(1)	58–74; 31 Mar 10(2)	71–69; 22 Dec 11(1)	6–9
RC Constantine	87–66; 9 Mar 9(2)	75–87; 13 Jan 15(1)	69–64; 8 Oct 8(1)	62–88; 5 Jan 13(1)	53–68; 1 Dec 6(1)	67–71; 6 Feb 5(2)	59–66; 21 Apr 14(2)	79–72; 27 Jan 3(2)	76–80; 30 Mar 10(2)	76–75; 22 Dec 11(1)	71–77; 27 Oct 4(1)		64–76; 13 Apr 12(2)	61–79; 23 Feb 7(2)	71–84; 20 Jan 1(2)	57–87; 17 Oct 2(1)	4–11
USM Alger	64–63; 6 Apr 11(2)	51–72; 19 Dec 2(1)	69–53; 16 Dec 10(1)	58–88; 13 Jan 15(1)	57–68; 8 Oct 8(1)	79–78; 24 Feb 7(2)	66–64; 20 Jan 1(2)	65–51; 6 Feb 5(2)	57–53; 21 Apr 14(2)	74–42; 17 Apr 13(2)	55–74; 2 Dec 6(1)	66–63; 29 Dec 12(1)		64–57; 9 Mar 9(2)	80–91; 27 Jan 3(2)	61–67; 27 Oct 4(1)	9–6
USM Blida	77–63; 9 Feb 6(2)	72–70; 13 Apr 12(2)	76–69; 26 Nov 5(1)	60–77; 30 Mar 10(2)	64–61; 27 Jan 3(2)	61–67; 17 Oct 2(1)	60–74; 23 Dec 11(1)	71–61; 13 Jan 15(1)	83–74; 2 Feb 4(2)	73–65; 2 Mar 8(2)	54–52; 20 Jan 1(2)	61–54; 5 Dec 7(1)	68–61; 12 Dec 9(1)		69–64; 6 Jan 13(1)	66–55; 21 Apr 14(2)	12–3
US Sétif	73–76; 27 Apr 15(2)	87–76; 9 Feb 6(2)	84–78; 9 Jan 14(1)	00–20; 2 Feb 4(2)	67–63; 29 Dec 12(1)	66–52; 6 Apr 11(2)	91–81; 26 Nov 5(1)	88–73; 24 Mar 9(2)	86–85; 5 Dec 7(1)	88–64; 23 Jan 2(2)	74–63; 16 Dec 10(1)	84–69; 13 Oct 1(1)	74–66; 20 Oct 3(1)	83–71; 17 Apr 13(2)		69–58; 9 Oct 8(1)	13–2
WA Boufarik	67–46; 13 Oct 1(1)	63–65; 5 Dec 7(1)	00–20; 1 May 15(2)	70–83; 26 Nov 5(1)	82–54; 17 Apr 13(2)	61–60; 29 Dec 12(1)	63–56; 9 Feb 6(2)	94–72; 16 Dec 10(1)	63–61; 12 Dec 9(1)	79–40; 21 Oct 3(1)	72–53; 6 Apr 11(2)	68–36; 23 Jan 2(2)	89–70; 2 Feb 4(2)	94–74; 9 Jan 14(1)	52–50; 2 Mar 8(2)		12–3
Record	12–3	5–10	13–2	13–2	4–11	7–8	7–9	12–3	9–6	15–0	10–5	13–2	8–7	9–6	6–9	7–8	

- Note: Small number and number in brackets indicate round number and leg, respectively
  Next scheduled games

=== Regular season standings ===
Updated as of 1 May 2018

Pos	Team	M	W	L	PF	PA	D	Pts
1	GS Pétroliers	30	27	3	2394	1780	614	57
2	CRB Dar Beida	30	24	6	2259	1861	398	54
3	US Sétif	30	23	7	2167	1984	183	52*
4	IRB Bordj Bou Arréridj	30	21	9	2354	2031	323	51
5	WO Boufarik	30	20	10	2009	1839	170	48*
6	USM Blida	30	18	12	2073	2079	−6	48
7	NB Staouéli	30	17	13	1980	1953	27	47
8	NA Hussein-Dey	30	17	13	2128	2031	97	47
9	OS Bordj Bou Arréridj	30	16	14	2058	2058	0	46
10	USM Alger	30	16	14	1928	1990	−62	46
11	PS El Eulma	30	11	19	1973	2080	−107	41
12	O Batna	30	10	20	2001	2164	−163	40
13	CSMBB Ouargla	30	8	22	1699	1960	−261	36**
14	RC Constantine	30	6	24	1781	2064	−283	35*
15	CSC Gué de Constantine	30	5	25	1875	2225	−350	35
16	OMS Miliana	30	1	29	1669	2249	−580	30*

- 1 loss by default (no point awarded)
  - 2 loss by default (no point awarded)

Advance to play-offs

== Play-offs 2018 ==
=== First tournament (US Sétif) ===
Fri, 11 May 2018
NA Hussein-Dey	89 : 57	USM Blida
CRB Dar Beida	60 : 62	US Sétif
GS Pétroliers	85 : 72	IRB Bordj Bou Arréridj
NB Staouéli	60 : 57	WO Boufarik
Sat, 12 May 2018
US Sétif	76 : 71	NA Hussein-Dey
IRB Bordj Bou Arréridj	68 : 67	CRB Dar Beida
WO Boufarik	77 : 85	GS Pétroliers
USM Blida	69 : 75	NB Staouéli

=== Second Tournament (CRB Dar Beida) ===
Fri, 18 May 2018
NA Hussein-Dey	88 : 67	NB Staouéli
US Sétif	81 : 80	IRB Bordj Bou Arréridj
CRB Dar Beida	74 : 73	WO Boufarik
GS Pétroliers	98 : 69	USM Blida
Sat, 19 May 2018
IRB Bordj Bou Arréridj	63 : 72	NA Hussein-Dey
WO Boufarik	70 : 69	US Sétif
USM Blida	63 : 72	CRB Dar Beida
NB Staouéli	62 : 86	GS Pétroliers

=== Third Tournament (GS Pétroliers) ===
Fri, 24 May 2018
GS Pétroliers	82 : 67	NA Hussein-Dey
CRB Dar Beida	76 : 90	NB Staouéli
US Sétif	64 : 57	USM Blida
IRB Bordj Bou Arréridj	72 : 91	WO Boufarik
Sat, 25 May 2018
NA Hussein-Dey	68 : 69	WO Boufarik
GS Pétroliers	81 : 69	CRB Dar Beida
NB Staouéli	60 : 59	US Sétif
USM Blida	71 : 85	IRB Bordj Bou Arréridj
San, 26 May 2018
CRB Dar Beida	78 : 74	NA Hussein-Dey
US Sétif	61 : 91	GS Pétroliers
IRB Bordj Bou Arréridj	76 : 80	NB Staouéli
WO Boufarik	83 : 76	USM Blida

==== Play-off standings ====
Pos	Team	Pld	W	L	GF	GA	GDIF	Pts
1	GS Pétroliers	7	7	0	608	477	131	14
2	NB Staouéli	7	5	2	484	511	−27	12
3	WO Boufarik	7	4	3	518	492	26	11
4	US Sétif	7	4	3	472	489	−17	11
5	CRB Dar Beida	7	3	4	495	500	−5	10
6	NA Hussein Dey	7	3	4	529	492	37	10
7	IRB Bordj Bou Arréridj	7	2	5	505	546	−41	9
8	USM Blida	7	0	7	462	566	−104	7

Advance to championship Final

== Play-down (May 11–26, 2018) ==
=== First tournament (PS El Eulma) ===
Fri, 11 May 2018
OS Bordj Bou Arréridj	73 : 67	OMS Miliana
USM Alger	67 : 61	RC Constantine
PS El Eulma	79 : 53	CSC Gué de Constantine
O Batna	58 : 48	CSMBB Ouargla
Sat, 12 May 2018
OMS Miliana	54 : 67	CSMBB Ouargla
OS Bordj Bou Arréridj	55 : 45	USM Alger
RC Constantine	69 : 76	PS El Eulma
CSC Gué de Constantine	55 : 54	O Batna

=== Second Tournament (USM Alger) ===
Fri, 18 May 2018
USM Alger	:	OMS Miliana
PS El Eulma	:	OS Bordj Bou Arréridj
O Batna	:	RC Constantine
CSMBB Ouargla	:	CSC Gué de Constantine
Sat, 19 May 2018
OMS Miliana	:	CSC Gué de Constantine
USM Alger	:	PS El Eulma
OS Bordj Bou Arréridj	:	O Batna
RC Constantine	:	CSMBB Ouargla

=== Third Tournament (OS Bordj Bou Arréridj) ===
Fri, 24 May 2018
PS El Eulma	:	OMS Miliana
O Batna	:	USM Alger
CSMBB Ouargla	:	OS Bordj Bou Arréridj
CSC Gué de Constantine	:	RC Constantine
Sat, 25 May 2018
OMS Miliana	:	RC Constantine
PS El Eulma	:	O Batna
USM Alger	:	CSMBB Ouargla
OS Bordj Bou Arréridj	:	CSC Gué de Constantine
San, 26 May 2018
O Batna	:	OMS Miliana
CSMBB Ouargla	:	PS El Eulma
CSC Gué de Constantine	:	USM Alger
RC Constantine	:	OS Bordj Bou Arréridj

==== Play-down standings ====
Pos	Team	Pld	W	L	GF	GA	GDIF	Pts
1	OS Bordj Bou Arréridj	0	0	0	0	0	0	0
2	USM Alger	0	0	0	0	0	0	0
3	PS El Eulma	0	0	0	0	0	0	0
4	O Batna	0	0	0	0	0	0	0
5	CSMBB Ouargla	0	0	0	0	0	0	0
6	RC Constantine	0	0	0	0	0	0	0
7	CSC Gué de Constantine	0	0	0	0	0	0	0
8	OMS Miliana	0	0	0	0	0	0	0

Relegated to Nationale B

== 2018 National 1 Finals ==
Wed, 30 May 2018
23:00 PM

Report

GS Pétroliers 103, NB Staouéli 73
Scoring by quarter: 31-16, 27-24, 21-16, 24-20
1–0

Salle hocine chaalane, Blida
Attendance: 100
Referees: Kaddour, Belkham, Hamada

Thu, 31 May 2018
23:00 PM

Report

NB Staouéli 92, GS Pétroliers 111
Scoring by quarter: 20-28, 11-20, 30-29, 31-24
0–2

Salle hocine chaalane, Blida
Attendance: 50
Referees: Si Youcef, Berrah, Ferhani
