= 2012–13 Algerian Basketball Cup =

2013 Coupe d'Algérie
Tournament details
- Arena: Hacène Harcha Arena; Algiers
- Dates: 13 May 2013

Awards and statistics

The 2012–13 Algerian Basketball Cup is the 44th edition of the Algerian Basketball Cup. It is managed by the FABB and is held in Algiers, in the Hacène Harcha Arena on May 13, 2013.

== Round of 32 ==
Date	Team 1	Team 2	Score
1 February 2013	AU Annaba	Sidi-bel-Abbès	0-20
1 February 2013	CRB Dar Beida	CSC Gué de Constantine	86-45
1 February 2013	MS Cherchell	CSMB OUARGLA	0-20
1 February 2013	ASPTT Oran	MC Saida	69-65
1 February 2013	OSBordj Bou Arreridj	CRB Temouchent	20-0
1 February 2013	IR Bougara	USM Alger	43-76
1 February 2013	COBB Oren	W Ghriss	99-40
2 February 2013	NB Staoueli	NA Hussein Dey	66-54
2 February 2013	CSM Constantine	WA Boufarik	60-50
2 February 2013	IRB Bordj Bou Arreridj	ASM Blida	55-72
2 February 2013	USM Sétif	Olympique Batna	86-87
2 February 2013	USM Blida	CRM Birkhadem	88-71
2 February 2013	OMS Miliana	US Constantine	68-56
2 February 2013	THB Msila	OC Birmouradrais	64-56
2 February 2013	ASS Oum Bouaghi	AB Skikda	62-104

== Round of 16 ==
Date	Team 1	Team 2	Score
22 March 2013	GS Pétroliers	ASM Blida	20-0
22 March 2013	CRB Dar Beida	USM Blida	84-78
22 March 2013	ASPTT Oran	Olympique Batna	0-20
22 March 2013	AB Skikda	CSM Constantine	56-61
22 March 2013	OSBordj Bou Arreridj	THB Msila	75-57
23 March 2013	CSMB OUARGLA	COBB Oren	75-58
23 March 2013	OMS Miliana	USM Alger	91-67
23 March 2013	NB Staoueli	Sidi-bel-Abbès	61-56

== Quarterfinals ==
Date	Team 1	Team 2	Score
7 May 2013	NB Staoueli	GS Pétroliers	57-75
7 May 2013	CRB Dar Beida	CSMB OUARGLA	78-47
7 May 2013	OSBordj Bou Arreridj	OMS Miliana	61-66
7 May 2013	CSM Constantine	O Batna	77-67

== Semifinals ==
Date	Team 1	Team 2	Score	
11 May 2013	CSM Constantine	OMS Miliana	83-70	Hacène Harcha Arena
11 May 2013	GS Pétroliers	CRB Dar Beida	83-76	Hacène Harcha Arena

== Final ==
13 May 2013	CSM Constantine	49–73	GS Pétroliers	Algiers
16:00 (CET)	Scoring by quarter: 14–19, 8–9, 10–24, 17–21
		Report		Arena: Hacène Harcha Arena; Attendance: , Referees: , ,
