= 2017–18 Algerian Basketball Cup =

2018 Coupe d'Algérie
Tournament details
- Arena: Hacène Harcha Arena; Algiers
- Dates: 8 June 2018

Final positions
- Champions: GS Pétroliers
- Runners-up: US Sétif

Awards and statistics

The 2017–18 Algerian Basketball Cup is the 49th edition of the Algerian Basketball Cup. It is managed by the FABB and is held in Algiers, in the Hacène Harcha Arena on July 5, 2018.

== Round of 16 ==
Draw on Saturday, February 24 at the headquarters of the Algerian Basketball Federation.

Date	Time	Team 1	Team 2	Score	Location	Referees
16 March 2018	16:00 (CET)	RC Constantine	NB Staoueli	67-70	8 Mai 1945 Arena, Sétif	Belkham, Saadi
16 March 2018	16:00 (CET)	CRB Dar El Beida	USM Blida	70-68	Hacène Harcha Arena, Algiers	Kaddour, Ferhani, Larouci
16 March 2018	16:00 (CET)	TRA Draria	PS El Eulma	47-52	Si Mustapha	Boulemia, Ouldache
23 March 2018	16:00 (CET)	GS Pétroliers	WO Boufarik	(Note: The GS Pétroliers was comfortably ahead by 60-44 when Nasheed Massoudi decided to stop the match in the final minute of the third quarter, after several stops due to the throwing of ballistic missiles, especially those that threatened the safety of the players, according to the technical governor's report. The start of the game was known as a significant delay due to skirmishes between the players and the marchers and then between the supporters.)	Hacène Harcha Arena, Algiers	Berrah, Mohammedi
17 March 2018	16:00 (CET)	OS Bordj Bou Arréridj	CSC Disser Kassentina	74-66	M'sila	Si Yousef, Belkada
17 March 2018	16:00 (CET)	O Batna	NA Hussein Dey	64-66	8 Mai 1945 Arena, Sétif	Belkham, Madjoudj
17 March 2018	14:30 (CET)	US Birkhadem	IRB Bordj Bou Arreridj	00-20	M'sila	
16 March 2018	16:00 (CET)	US Sétif	JS Bae Ain Arbaa	79-57	Moussa Charef Arena, Boufarik	Si Yousef, Heddi

== Bracket ==
Quarterfinals; 13–14 April
US Sétif	71
NB Staoueli	55
NA Hussein Dey	66
OS Bordj Bou Arréridj	53
IRB Bordj Bou Arreridj	55
GS Pétroliers	91
CRB Dar El Beida	78
PS El Eulma	41

Semifinals; 5 May

Final; 8 June
US Sétif	56
GS Pétroliers	75

== Quarterfinals ==
14 April 2018	US Sétif	71–55	NB Staoueli
00:00 (CET)	Scoring by quarter: –, –, –, –
				Attendance: , Referees: , ,

14 April 2018	NA Hussein Dey	66–53	OS Bordj Bou Arréridj
00:00 (CET)	Scoring by quarter: –, –, –, –
				Attendance: , Referees: , ,

14 April 2018	IRB Bordj Bou Arreridj	55–91	GS Pétroliers
00:00 (CET)	Scoring by quarter: –, –, –, –
				Attendance: , Referees: , ,

14 April 2018	CRB Dar Beida	78–41	PS El Eulma
00:00 (CET)	Scoring by quarter: –, –, –, –
				Attendance: , Referees: , ,

== Semifinals ==
5 May 2018	NA Hussein Dey	69–71	GS Pétroliers	Rouiba
00:00 (CET)	Scoring by quarter: –, –, –, –
				Attendance: , Referees: , ,

5 May 2018	CRB Dar Beida	60–66	US Sétif	M'sila
00:00 (CET)	Scoring by quarter: –, –, –, –
				Attendance: , Referees: , ,

== Final ==
8 June 2018	GS Pétroliers	75–56	US Sétif	Algiers
23:40 (CET)	Scoring by quarter: 21–8, 16–14, 15–16, 23–18
	Pts: Belkhodja, Touati 11	Boxscore		Arena: Hacène Harcha Arena; Attendance: , Referees: , ,
