= Dekkiche =

Dekkiche is a surname. Notable people with the surname include:

- Abdesslem Dekkiche (born 1986), Algerian basketball player
- Yacine Dekkiche (born 1980), French rugby league and rugby union player
