= 2014–15 Algerian Basketball Championship =

ABC Super Division 2014–15
- League: ABC Super Division
- Sport: Basketball
- Duration: Sep 12, 2014 – May 31, 2015
- Teams: 14
- Season champions: GS Pétroliers
- League champions: GS Pétroliers

Algerian Basketball Championship seasons
- ← 2014 2016 →

The 2014–15 Super Division (53rd edition), Algeria's top tier basketball club competition ran from September 12, 2014 through May 31, 2015.

== ABC Super Division Participants (2014–15 Season) ==
Locations of teams for the 2014–15 Algerian Basketball Championship

Promoted from 2nd Division

Team	Home	Venue
CSMBB Ouargla	Ouargla	
CRB Dar Beida	Dar El Beida	Salle de Dar El Beïda
AB Skikda	Skikda	
GS Pétroliers	Algiers	
IRB Bordj Bou Arreridj	Bordj Bou Arréridj	
NB Staoueli	Staoueli	Salle omnisports de Staouéli
NA Hussein Dey	Algiers	
Olympique Batna	Batna	OPOW de Batna
OMS Miliana	Miliana	
CSM Constantine	Constantine	
ASM Blida	Blida	Salle Hocine Chalane
USM Blida	Blida	Salle Hocine Chalane
US Sétif	Sétif	Salle 8 Mai 1945
WA Boufarik	Boufarik	Salle Moussa-Charef

== Regular season (September 12, 2014 - ? ? 2015) ==
=== Regular season standings ===
Updated as of 13 October 2017.

Pos	Team	M	W	L	PF	PA	D	Pts
1	GS Pétroliers	24	23	1	1839	1369	470	47
2	USM Sétif	24	19	7	1755	1537	218	44
3	CRB Dar El Beida	24	16	8	1568	1490	78	40
4	IRB Bordj Bou Arreridj	24	16	8	1533	1384	149	40
5	NA Hussein Dey	24	14	10	1683	1653	30	39
6	AB Skikda	24	10	14	1636	1672	-36	34
7	NB Staoueli	24	10	14	1505	1564	-59	34
8	Olympique Batna	24	10	14	1489	1572	-83	34
9	OMS Miliana	24	8	16	1566	1634	-68	32
12	CSM Constantine	24	8	16	1675	1892	-217	32
11	USM Blida	24	6	18	1407	1545	-138	28
12	WA Boufarik	24	6	18	1499	1660	-161	28
13	CSMBB Ouargla	24	4	20	1409	1592	-183	27
14	ASM Blida	0	0	0	0	0	0	0

- 1 loss by default (no point awarded)

Advance to play-offs
Relegated to Nationale B

== Stage 2 play-offs (April - May, 2018) ==
=== Play-off standings ===
Pos	Team	Pld	W	L	GF	GA	GDIF	Pts
1	USM Sétif	7	6	1	496	378	118	13
2	GS Pétroliers	7	6	1	523	483	40	13
3	CRB Dar El Beida	7	5	2	491	448	43	12
4	NA Hussein Dey	7	4	3	472	469	3	11
5	IRB Bordj Bou Arreridj	7	3	4	450	468	-18	10
6	AB Skikda	7	2	5	472	522	-50	9
7	Olympique Batna	7	2	5	451	511	-60	9
8	NB Staoueli	7	0	7	466	542	-76	7

Advance to championship Final

== Championship final ==
Tue, 26 May 2015
18:00 CET UTC+1

Report

GS Pétroliers	75–64	US Sétif
Scoring by quarter: -, -, -, -
1–0

Salle Abdelaziz Ben Tifour, Hydra
Referees: , ,

Fri, 29 May 2015
17:00 CET UTC+1

US Sétif	55–53	GS Pétroliers
Scoring by quarter: -, -, -, -
1–1

?, ?
Referees: , ,

Sat, 30 May 2015
18:00 CET UTC+1

Report

US Sétif	66–69	GS Pétroliers
Scoring by quarter: -, -, -, -
1–2

Salle du complexe 8 mai 1945, Sétif
Referees: , ,
