= Mustapha Adrar =

Algerian professional basketball player

No. 50 – GS Pétroliers
- Position: Center
- League: Super Division

Personal information
- Born: 12 April 1982 (age 44) Algiers, Algeria
- Listed height: 6 ft 8 in (2.03 m)

Career history
- –2008: OC Alger
- 2008–present: GS Pétroliers

Mustapha Adrar (born 12 April 1982) is an Algerian basketball player who plays for GS Pétroliers and Algeria.

== Honours ==
=== Club ===
GS Pétroliers

- Super Division: 2010, 2011, 2012, 2014, 2015, 2016, 2017, 2018, 2019.
- Algerian Basketball Cup: 2009, 2011, 2012, 2013, 2014, 2015, 2016.

== BAL career statistics ==
Legend
GP	Games played	GS	Games started	MPG	Minutes per game
FG%	Field goal percentage	3P%	3-point field goal percentage	FT%	Free throw percentage
RPG	Rebounds per game	APG	Assists per game	SPG	Steals per game
BPG	Blocks per game	PPG	Points per game	**Bold**	Career high

Retrieved from RealGM

Year	Team	GP	GS	MPG	FG%	3P%	FT%	RPG	APG	SPG	BPG	PPG
2021	GS Pétroliers	3	0	12.4	.267	.273	–	2.7	1.3	.3	.0	3.7
Career		3	0	12.4	.267	.273	–	2.7	1.3	.3	.0	3.7
