= Arsène Mutomb Mbav =

Congolese basketball player

No. 13 – Espoir Fukash
- Position: Center
- League: Liprobakin

Personal information
- Born: 8 August 1987 (age 39)
- Listed height: 2.09 m (6 ft 10 in)

Career history
- BC SCTP
- ASB Mazembe
- 2019–2020: CB Cazorla
- 2020–2021: AS Hammamet
- 2021–present: Espoir Fukash
Medals
Men's basketball
Representing the Democratic Republic of the Congo
FIBA AfroCan
Gold medal – first place	Bamako 2019

Arsène "Kagamé" Mutomb Mbav (born 8 August 1987) is a Congolese basketball player, who plays for Espoir Fukash of the Liprobakin and the DR Congo national basketball team. Standing at 209 cm (6 ft 10 1/2 in), he plays as center.

== Professional career ==
In August 2019, Mutomb Mbav signed with CB Cazorla in the Spanish Liga EBA.

In the 2020–21 season, Mutomb Mbav played for Tunisian club AS Hammamet in the Championnat National A.

== National team career ==
Mutombe Mbav was a member of the DR Congo national basketball team, and helped the team win the gold medal at FIBA AfroCan 2019, contributing 5 points and 5.3 rebounds per game. He also played at FIBA AfroBasket 2021 for his country.
