= Abdesslem Dekkiche =

Algerian professional basketball player

No. 9 – GS Pétroliers
- Position: Power forward
- League: Super Division; Basketball Africa League

Personal information
- Born: 27 February 1986 (age 40) Boufarik, Algeria
- Listed height: 6 ft 5 in (1.96 m)

Career history
- –2011: WA Boufarik
- 2011–present: GS Pétroliers
Medals
Men's basketball
Representing Algeria
Arab Basketball Championship
Bronze medal – third place	2022 Dubai

Abdesslem Dekkiche (born 27 February 1986) is an Algerian basketball player who plays for GS Pétroliers. He also played for the Algeria national basketball team during his career. Standing at 1.96 m (6 ft 5 in), he plays as power forward.

== National team career ==
Dekkiche played with the Algeria national basketball team at the 2013, 2015 and 2017 AfroBasket tournaments.

== Honours ==
=== Club ===
GS Pétroliers

- Super Division: 2012, 2014, 2015, 2016, 2017, 2018, 2019
- Algerian Basketball Cup: 2012, 2013, 2014, 2015, 2016

== BAL career statistics ==
Legend
GP	Games played	GS	Games started	MPG	Minutes per game
FG%	Field goal percentage	3P%	3-point field goal percentage	FT%	Free throw percentage
RPG	Rebounds per game	APG	Assists per game	SPG	Steals per game
BPG	Blocks per game	PPG	Points per game	**Bold**	Career high

Retrieved from RealGM.com.

Year	Team	GP	GS	MPG	FG%	3P%	FT%	RPG	APG	SPG	BPG	PPG
2021	GS Pétroliers	3	2	25.5	.364	.000	.286	3.0	3.0	1.7	.3	3.3
Career		3	2	25.5	.364	.000	.286	3.0	3.0	1.7	.3	3.3
