= OC Alger (basketball) =

- Leagues: Algerian Basketball Championship
- Founded: CS DNC Algiers (1977–1982); IRB Algiers (1982–1996); OC Algiers since 1996
- Location: Algiers, Algeria

OC Alger is an Algerian basketball club located in Algiers, Algeria.

== History ==
Founded in 1977, the club originally bore the name CS DNC Alger. However, with ECTA (Construction and Works Company of Algiers) stepping in as their primary sponsor, it underwent a renaming to IRB Alger (Ittihad Riadhi el-Binaa Alger). In 1996, the club transitioned to its current title, OC Alger. However, due to financial crises, many disciplines within the club dissolved in 2003.

== Honors ==
- Algerian Basketball Championship: 1976, 1988, 1995, 1996
- Algerian Basketball Cup: 1974, 1988
- Arab Club Basketball Championship: 1989
