= MS Cherchell =

Algerian football club

- Full name: Mouloudia Sportive de Cherchell
- Founded: February 13, 1947; 79 years ago
- Ground: Rabah Mezoui Stadium
- Capacity: 5,000
- League: Interregional Football League
- 2024–25: Inter-Régions Division, Group Centre-west, 11th
Home colours	Away colours

Mouloudia Sportive de Cherchell (Arabic: المولودية الرياضية لشرشال), known as MS Cherchell or simply MSC for short, is an Algerian football club located in Cherchell, Algeria. The club was founded in 1947 and its colours are green and red. Their home stadium, Rabah Mezoui Stadium, has a capacity of 5,000 spectators. The club is currently playing in the Interregional Football League.

== History ==
=== Birth of Mouloudia Sportif Cherchellois ===
The Mouloudia was founded in the aftermath of the Second World War, driven by the deep desire of Algerian youth to escape the oppressive atmosphere of colonial rule. Its creation represented a genuine instinct for survival and a form of identity expression. The establishment of Muslim sports associations faced numerous obstacles. The colonial administration provided little support and imposed strict supervision. In 1948, Article 13 of the Algerian Code strengthened state control over gatherings, as authorities sought to prevent “a return of the disorders” that had occurred in eastern Algeria in May 1945.

=== Foundation ===
The first founders were students from religious schools (médersiens) as well as former players of Étoile Cherchelloise, some of whom were involved with the M.T.L.D. Their goal was to raise awareness among the youth about the realities of the time and to provide a healthy athletic environment. The club was officially established on 13 February 1947. At its inception, the Mouloudia was a modest association but quickly sought legal and official recognition, as it was entering a landscape dominated by European-only sports organizations, such as equestrian, tennis, sailing, hunting sections, and the club known as the Césaréenne. Beyond sports, the Mouloudia became a symbol of the reaction of Algerian youth longing for expression, suffering under both psychological and moral suffocation. The association offered an escape from harsh daily realities and gave young Algerians the opportunity to compete with Europeans, who had long been privileged in access to sports structures.

We must also highlight an important event that took place during the 1947–1948 season. The Mouloudia recorded the signing, under license B, of new players: Souliamas Nourredine and Mezagharni Merouane, both well-known figures in the team favored by the colonial authorities, who nevertheless chose to join the Mouloudia from its creation. Another significant aspect of the M.S.C. deserves mention: its spontaneous and revolutionary origins. Born within the working classes, the club quickly acquired an ideological importance that went far beyond the role of a simple sports association. The M.S.C. had to fight on equal footing and, later on, to assert itself despite the open hostility expressed by Europeans.

Mouloudia players were subjected to threats and even abusive dismissals from their workplaces. This did not discourage them; their motto became: “Ignore provocations and redouble efforts.” This marked the beginning of a new era for the population of Cherchell, similar to many Algerian cities where “Muslim” clubs were being founded. As mentioned earlier, Mouloudia began in Third Division, facing many difficulties before finally earning promotion to Second Division after five years of struggle and relentless effort, under the guidance of Mr. Cherif-Slimane, and later Mr. Maadoudou. Building on this momentum, the club was crowned Second Division champion in 1954. It was one of the youngest clubs in the division, and its coach at the time was Tareb El-Anouar. The championship-winning team was composed of: Benhamouda Mohamed, Cherif Slimane Kaddour, Bekhti Abdelkader, Moussoni Allel, Bencherifa Ali, Souliamas Nourredine, Bencherifa Abdelkader, Zegrar Abdelkader, Mouantri Mohamed, Bendifallah Ali, and Kebilene Smain.

On 20 April 2019, MS Cherchell were promoted to the Interregional Football League.

=== MS Cherchell and National Liberation War ===
Mouloudia Sportif Cherchellois (MSC) was one of the rare Algerian clubs whose entire team players and officials fell as martyrs during the War of Liberation (1956–1960). Despite the significance of this collective sacrifice, very few studies have examined this crucial chapter of Algerian sports history. Under the leadership of Belkacem Alioui, a MTLD activist and president of the club, the MS Cherchell became a discreet hub of clandestine activity, with Alioui’s café serving as a meeting place for young patriots. Many players joined the maquis of Wilaya IV, taking on various responsibilities before falling in battle.

According to historical accounts, members of Mouloudia Sportive de Cherchell participated in the Algerian War (1954–1962). Witnesses, including Abderrahmane Benhamouda, have noted the limited written documentation concerning the club's involvement in the independence movement. Among the club members reported to have died during the conflict were Lakhdar Bouchema, Abdelkader Younès, Abdelkader Zegrar, the Bendifallah brothers, and Noureddine Saâdoun. Historical accounts also describe how football-related gatherings in Cherchell provided opportunities for nationalist meetings and the coordination of activities away from the attention of French colonial authorities. Several members of the club subsequently joined the maquis during the independence struggle. The club's wartime history has been documented in accounts examining the relationship between football and the Algerian independence movement.
