= CRB Dar Beida =

- Leagues: Algerian Basketball Championship; FIBA Africa Clubs Champions Cup
- Arena: Salle de Dar El Beïda
- Capacity: 1,500
- Location: Dar El Beida, Algeria
- Team colors
- Championships: 0 Algerian Leagues; 0 Algerian Cups

Chabab Riadhi Baladiat Dar El Beïda, commonly known as CRB Dar Beida, is the basketball team of the multi-sports club that of the same name. The club is based in Dar El Beida, Algeria. Since 1997, the team has played in the first stages but was unable to achieve any title, despite reaching the Algerian Cup final five times and the final of the Super Division three times. Its best season was 2010–11, when it was runner-up in the championship and cup.

== History ==
The basketball section of Chabab Riadhi Baladiat Dar El Beïda, founded in 1977, is based in Dar El Beïda, in the eastern suburbs of Algiers. It is considered one of the most consistent and respected clubs in Algerian basketball. The team’s traditional colors are red and white, and it plays its home games at the Salle omnisports de Dar El Beïda.

Since 1997, the club has continuously competed at the highest national level, establishing itself as a reliable force in the Algerian championship. It has reached five Algerian Cup finals and five national league finals, highlighting its sustained performances over the years. These achievements have enabled the club to represent Algeria in several regional and continental competitions, including the Arab Club Champions Championship, the Maghreb Tournament, and the African Champions Cup.

After several decades at the top level, the club experienced a difficult period in 2024, marked by relegation. However, it quickly bounced back the following season, achieving an outstanding unbeaten campaign and securing promotion back to the top tier of Algerian basketball.

CRB Dar El Beïda is also recognized for the quality of its youth development system, regularly competing at the highest level in national youth competitions. The U21 team notably achieved a historic performance during the 2024–2025 season by winning five major titles, including the Algerian Championship and the Algerian Cup, confirming the strength and success of the club’s basketball academy. Today, Chabab Riadhi Baladiat Dar El Beïda Basketball remains a symbol of discipline, passion, and success, and continues to play an active role in the development of basketball in Algeria.

== Statistics ==
=== Season by season ===
Season	Regular season						Playoffs	Algerian Cup	African competitions
Season	Division	Pos	Pts	P	W	L	Playoffs	Algerian Cup	African competitions
1996–97	Super Division A		0	0	0	0	Semi-finals	Runner-up	
1997–98	Super Division A	6th	27	18	9	9	Not qualify	Quarterfinalist	
1998–99	Super Division A		0	0	0	0			
1999–00	Super Division A	6th	33	22	11	11	Not qualify		
2000–01	Super Division A		0	0	0	0			
2001–02	Super Division A		0	0	0	0			
2002–03	Super Division A		0	0	0	0			
2003–04	Super Division A		0	0	0	0			
2004–05	Super Division A		0	0	0	0			
2005–06	Super Division A		0	0	0	0		Runner-up	
2006–07	Super Division A		0	0	0	0		Semifinalist	
2007–08	Super Division A	2nd	44	26	18	8	Runner-up		
2008–09	Super Division A	2nd	21	11	10	1		Semifinalist	
2009–10	Super Division A	2nd	24	14	10	4	Runner-up	Semifinalist	
2010–11	Super Division A	5th	51	30	21	9	Runner-up	Runner-up	
2011–12	Super Division A	4th	50	30	20	10	—N/a	Runner-up	
2012–13	Super Division A	1st	34	18	16	2	3rd	Semifinalist	
2013–14	Super Division A	2nd	32	18	14	4	Runner-up	Quarterfinalist	
2014–15	Super Division A	3rd	40	24	16	8	3rd	Runner-up	
2015–16	Super Division A	2nd	47	26	21	5	Runner-up	Quarterfinalist	
2016–17	Super Division A	1st	21	11	10	1	3rd	Semifinalist	
2017–18	National 1	2nd	54	30	24	6	5th		
2018–19	National 1								
2019–20	National 1	Canceled (Note: On March 15, 2020, the Ministry of Youth and Sports decided to stop the season due to the COVID-19 pandemic in Algeria.)							
2020–21	National 1	Canceled							
2021–22	Super Division		0	0	0	0		Round of 16 (Note: The Algerian Basketball Federation (FABB) has decided, exceptionally, to cancel the Algerian Cup for the 2021–22 season and replace it with a Coupe fédérale which only concerns the 20 teams in the Super Division.)	
2022–23	Super Division		0	0	0	0			
2023–24	Super Division	15th	39	30	10	20	Not qualify	Round of 16	
2024–25	National 1		0	0	0	0	—N/a	Round of 16	

== Trophies ==
- Algerian Basketball Championship: 0

Runner-up (5): 2008, 2010, 2011, 2014, 2016

- Algerian Basketball Cup: 0

Runner-up (5): 1997, 2006, 2011, 2012, 2015
