= Algerian Basketball Championship =

Professional basketball championship in Algeria

Super Division
- Formerly: ABC National 1A; Super Division
- Founded: 1962; 64 years ago
- First season: 1962–63
- Country: Algeria
- Confederation: FIBA Africa
- Number of teams: 14
- Level on pyramid: 1
- Relegation to: ABC Second Division
- Domestic cup: Algerian Cup
- International cup: FIBA Champions Cup
- Current champions: WA Boufarik (11th title)
- Most championships: MC Alger (21 titles)
- Website: fabbalgerie.org
- 2025–26 season

The Algerian Basketball Championship, now called the Super Division and formally known as the ABC Super Division, is the pre-eminent men's basketball league in Algeria. National 1 is contested by 16 teams, with the two lowest-placed teams relegated to the Second Division and replaced by the two playoff winners. From 1963 onwards, MC Alger (21 titles) and WA Boufarik (9 titles) both dominated. Darak El-Watani won 11 titles but no longer exists.

== Play history ==
Before Algeria's independence, there were several regional leagues led by the French federation. The Algerian Basketball Championship was founded in 1962 when the country achieved independence. The first, second, and third championships were won by ASM Oran in 1963, 1964, and 1965, respectively. Capital clubs began dominating the championship starting in the 1965–66 season. USM Alger won three titles (1966, 1967, and 1969) over the next few years, with RAM Alger breaking their win streak by winning in 1968. Darak El-Watani pulled ahead with 11 titles, including six consecutive wins between 1977 and 1982. MP Alger won four times in the mid-1980s, and again in 1988–89 under the name MC Alger. WA Boufarik won five consecutive titles between 1990 and 1994 and an additional three between 1997 and 1999. IRB Alger (later renamed OC Alger) broke the first streak by winning the championships in 1994–95 and 1995–96. WA Boufarik also won four Algerian Basketball Cups in the 1990s.

The GS Pétroliers dominated the first 20 years of the 2000s, first as MC Alger with titles in the 1999–2000 and 2000–01 seasons; four consecutive wins between 2003 and 2006; and one in 2007–08. The team started its run under its new name, MC Alger, with three consecutive wins (2009 to 2012), punctuated by a loss to CSM Constantine, and another six consecutive wins (2013 to 2019) before the COVID-19 pandemic interrupted play.

In the 2006–07 season, there were six teams: WA Boufarik, CRB Dar El-Beida, WB Aïn Bénian, AS PTT Alger, MC Alger, and NB Staouéli. In the sixth minute of the second quarter of a mini-championship playoff game against DRB Staouéli, MC Alger left the court while the score was 28–21 in favor of DRB Staouéli. International referee Noureddine Chachoua awarded MC Alger a loss by penalty, allowing DRB Staouéli to win the championship for the first time. Two seasons later, AS PPT Alger also won the title after defeating GS Pétroliers in a mini-championship 2nd tournament playoff in Hydra. At halftime, the score was 45–31 and increased to 81–81 by the end of the game with three seconds left. Faycal Belkhodja was able to score three points, taking the win for GS Pétroliers.

The final match (best of three) system, which had been absent for most of the early 2000s, returned in the 2010–11 season. The GS Pétroliers swept CRB Dar Beida in the finals. The competition system changed again; now, a tournament of 16 clubs would play 30 matches each. The club that came first in points was crowned champion. The GS Pétroliers beat US Sétif (107–65) to win their second consecutive title. They also won the Algerian Basketball Cup for the second consecutive time.

The 2012–13 season brought another competition system change. Twenty clubs returned and four new ones joined. They were divided into groups A and B, with each group playing 18 matches as part of phase one. In phase two, the first four teams of each group moved on to the playoffs. The remaining teams were up for relegation. CSM Constantine beat GS Pétroliers 2–1 and won the title for the first time. The team went on to represent Algeria at the 2013 FIBA Africa Clubs Champions Cup. By the start of the next season, CSM Constantine had lost most of its star players and GS Pétroliers returned to win the title for four consecutive seasons, in addition to four consecutive cup wins. Due to its winning streak and sponsorship from Sonatrach, GS Pétroliers was the only club not to struggle with financial issues in the early 2010s.

== Clubs ==
The following is a list of clubs that participated in the 2024-25 season:

Locations of teams for the 2024–25 Algerian Basketball Championship

Promoted from National 1

Team	Home city	Arena
WO Boufarik	Boufarik	Salle Moussa Charef
NB Staouéli	Staoueli	Salle de Staouéli
CSC Djasr Kasentina	Djasr Kasentina	Salle omnisport de Douéra
NA Hussein Dey	Algiers	Salle Mohamed Handjer
TRA Draria	Draria	Salle OMS Ghazali Salem (Ouled Fayet)
CR Beni Saf	Béni Saf	Salle OMS Yousfi Said
OS Bordj Bou Arréridj	Bordj Bou Arréridj	Salle omnisports du 18 Février
MC Alger	Hydra	Salle OMS Abdelaziz Ben Tifour
USM Alger	Algiers	Salle Rais Hamidou
CB Rouïba	Rouïba	Salle Mohamed Kadiri
USM Blida	Blida	Salle Hocine Chalane
Ouled Chebel Basket Ball	Ouled Chebel	Salle OMS Boualem Bouhedja
Olympique Batna	Batna	
CS Tlemcen	Tlemcen	Salle OMS Kara Zaitri Imama

== Title holders ==
Below is the list of the champions since the first edition in 1962–63. MC Alger and WA Boufarik have historically been rivals due to both teams' high win count.

- 1962–63: ASM Oran
- 1963–64: ASM Oran (2)
- 1964–65: ASM Oran (3)
- 1965–66: USM Alger
- 1966–67: USM Alger (2)
- 1967–68: RAM Alger
- 1968–69: USM Alger (3)
- 1969–70: Darak El-Watani
- 1970–71: CSS Kouba
- 1971–72: Darak El-Watani (2)
- 1972–73: Darak El-Watani (3)
- 1973–74: Darak El-Watani (4)
- 1974–75: Darak El-Watani (5)
- 1975–76: CS DNC Alger
- 1976–77: Darak El-Watani (6)
- 1977–78: Darak El-Watani (7)
- 1978–79: Darak El-Watani (8)
- 1979–80: Darak El-Watani (9)
- 1980–81: Darak El-Watani (10)
- 1981–82: Darak El-Watani (11)
- 1982–83: MP Alger
- 1983–84: MP Oran
- 1984–85: MP Alger (2)
- 1985–86: MP Alger (3)
- 1986–87: MP Alger (4)
- 1987–88: IRB Alger (2)
- 1988–89: MP Alger (5)
- 1989–90: WA Boufarik
- 1990–91: WA Boufarik (2)
- 1991–92: WA Boufarik (3)
- 1992–93: WA Boufarik (4)
- 1993–94: WA Boufarik (5)
- 1994–95: IRB Alger (3)
- 1995–96: IRB/ECT Alger (4)
- 1996–97: WA Boufarik (6)
- 1997–98: WA Boufarik (7)
- 1998–99: WA Boufarik (8)
- 1999–2000: MC Alger (6)
- 2000–01: MC Alger (7)
- 2001–02: WA Boufarik (9)
- 2002–03: MC Alger (8)
- 2003–04: MC Alger (9)
- 2004–05: MC Alger (10)
- 2005–06: MC Alger (11)
- 2006–07: DRB Staouéli
- 2007–08: MC Alger (12)
- 2008–09: AS PTT Alger
- 2009–10: GS Pétroliers (13)
- 2010–11: GS Pétroliers (14)
- 2011–12: GS Pétroliers (15)
- 2012–13: CSM Constantine
- 2013–14: GS Pétroliers (16)
- 2014–15: GS Pétroliers (17)
- 2015–16: GS Pétroliers (18)
- 2016–17: GS Pétroliers (19)
- 2017–18: GS Pétroliers (20)
- 2018–19: GS Pétroliers (21)
- 2019–20: cancelled
- 2020–21: cancelled
- 2021–22: NB Staouéli (2)
- 2022–23: USM Alger (4)
- 2023–24: WO Boufarik (10)
- 2024–25: NB Staouéli (3)
- 2025–26: WO Boufarik (11)

=== League championships by club ===
Team	Won	Years won
MC Alger	21	1983, 1985, 1986, 1987, 1989, 2000, 2001, 2003, 2004, 2005, 2006, 2008, 2010, 2011, 2012, 2014, 2015, 2016, 2017, 2018, 2019
Darak El-Watani	11	1970, 1972, 1973, 1974, 1975, 1977, 1978, 1979, 1980, 1981, 1982
WA Boufarik	11	1990, 1991, 1992, 1993, 1994, 1997, 1998, 1999, 2002, 2024, 2026
USM Alger	4	1966, 1967, 1969, 2023
OC Alger	4	1976, 1988, 1995, 1996
ASM Oran	3	1963, 1964, 1965
NB Staouéli	3	2007, 2022, 2025
RAM Alger	1	1968
MC Oran	1	1984
AS PTT Alger	1	2009
CSM Constantine	1	2013
RC Kouba	1	1971

=== Super Division seasons and finals from 1995 ===
Season	Date	Ref	Champion	Series	Score			Runner-up	Champion Coach
1995–96	Jul ?–11		IRB/ECT Alger (4)	2–0	65–55	??–??	—	WA Boufarik	(Algeria)
1996–97	Jun 29–Jul 10		WA Boufarik (6)	2–1	55–51	70–63	55–60	NA Hussein Dey	(Algeria) Ahmed Loubachria
1997–98	Jun 11–16		WA Boufarik (7)	2–0	92–75	62–58	—	DRB Staouéli	(Algeria) Ahmad Benyabou
1998–99	?– ?		WA Boufarik (8)	Round Robin				?	
1999–00	?– ?		MC Alger (6)	Round Robin				?	
2000–01	?– ?		MC Alger (7)	Round Robin				?	
2001–02	Apr 19–May 24		WA Boufarik (9)	Round Robin				MC Alger	
2002–03	?–Jun 13		MC Alger (8)	Round Robin				?	(Algeria) Bilal Faid
2003–04	Jul 1–9		MC Alger (9)	2–0	79–65	79–56	—	COBB Oran	(Algeria) Bilal Faid
2004–05	?– ?		MC Alger (10)	Round Robin				WA Boufarik	
2005–06	?– ?		MC Alger (11)	Round Robin				WA Boufarik	(Algeria) Bilal Faid
2006–07	?– ?		DRB Staouéli	Round Robin				MC Alger	(Algeria) Ahmed Loubachria
2007–08	?– ?		MC Alger (12)	Round Robin				CRB Dar Beida	(Cuba) Valiente Conde
2008–09	?– ?		AS PTT Alger	Round Robin				GS Pétroliers	(Algeria) Reda Saiak
2009–10	May 7–May 22		GS Pétroliers (13)	Round Robin				CRB Dar Beida	(Algeria) Ahmed Loubachria
2010–11	Jun ?–Jul 1		GS Pétroliers (14)	2–0	109–78	91–80	—	CRB Dar Beida	(Algeria) Bilal Faid
2011–12	Oct 27–May 29		GS Pétroliers (15)	Round Robin				CSM Constantine	(Algeria) Bilal Faid
2012–13	Apr 30–May 4		CSM Constantine	2–1	63–54	85–64	54–65	GS Pétroliers	(Algeria) Said Didi
2013–14	May 27–30		GS Pétroliers (16)	2–0	91–73	54–64	—	CRB Dar Beida	(United States) Sean Whalen
2014–15	May 26–30		GS Pétroliers (17)	2–1	75–64	55–53	66–69	US Sétif	(United States) Sean Whalen
2015–16	May 24–28		GS Pétroliers (18)	2–1	53–65	55–88	87–71	CRB Dar Beida	(Algeria) Bilal Faid
2016–17	Jul 13–14		GS Pétroliers (19)	2–0	71–75	94–61	—	NA Hussein Dey	(France) Nicolas Meistelman
2017–18	May 30–31		GS Pétroliers (20)	2–0	103–73	111–92	—	NB Staouéli	(Algeria) Sofiane Boulahya
2018–19	May 18		GS Pétroliers (21)	1–0	102–68	—	—	NB Staouéli	(Algeria) Sofiane Boulahya
2019–20	Cancelled due to the COVID-19 pandemic in Algeria								
2020–21	Cancelled due to the COVID-19 pandemic in Algeria								
2021–22	Jun 2–4		NB Staouéli (2)	—	—	—	—	WA Boufarik	
2022–23	Jun 8–10		USM Alger (4)	Round Robin				WA Boufarik	(Algeria) Réda El Hachemi
2023–24	Jun 28–Jul 2		WO Boufarik (10)	2–0	83–59	60–41	—	TRA Draria	(Algeria) Sofiane Boulahia
2024–25	Jun 13–Jun 14		NB Staouéli (3)	2–0	69–67	70–59	—	NA Hussein Dey	(Algeria) Mohamed Yahya
2025–26	Sep 12–Apr 11		WO Boufarik (11)	2–1	64–82	87–79	70—66	NB Staouéli	(Algeria) Hachemi Reda

== See also ==
- Algerian Basketball Cup
- Algerian Women's Basketball Championship
