= MC Alger (basketball) =

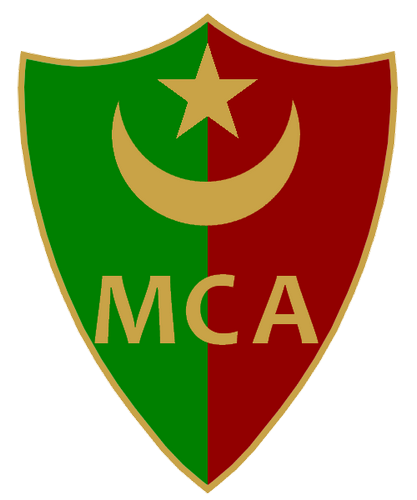
- Nickname: Le Doyen
- Leagues: Algerian Basketball Championship
- Founded: 7 August 1921; 104 years ago, as Mouloudia Club d'Alger; 2008; 17 years ago, as GS Pétroliers
- Arena: Hacène Harcha Arena
- Capacity: 8,000
- Location: Algiers, Algeria
- Team colours: Green, Red
- President: Djaffar Bel Hocine
- Head coach: Lamine Mohamed Krideche
- Championships: 20 Algerian Leagues; 20 Algerian Cups
| Home | Away |

Mouloudia Club d'Alger (Arabic: نادي مولودية الجزائر), referred to as MC Alger or MCA for short, is an Algerian basketball team that was founded on 7 August 1921, as a division of MC Alger. They play their home games in the Hacène Harcha Arena, which has a capacity of 8,000 people. The team has won a record twenty-one Algerian national championships, as well as twenty Algerian Cups.

== History ==
The team was originally part of the Mouloudia Club d'Alger (MC Alger) club, but became a part of Groupement Sportif des Pétroliers (Arabic: المجمع الرياضي البترولي; English: Sports Group of Oil Fields) on 2 June 2008. Starting from the 1999–2000 season, the team has won numerous titles in Algeria.

By the start of the 2023–24, the defending champions CSM Constantine had lost most of its star players and GS Pétroliers returned to win the title for six consecutive seasons, in addition to nine consecutive cup wins. Due to its winning streak and sponsorship from Sonatrach, GS Pétroliers was the only club not to struggle with financial issues in the early 2010s. The 2019–20 and 2020–21 season were then cancelled due to the COVID-19 pandemic.

On 30 November 2019, GS Pétroliers qualified for the 2020 season of the Basketball Africa League (BAL), by winning the West Division of the qualifying tournaments. The season was later rescheduled to 2021 due to the COVID-19 pandemic. In the group stage, GSP lost its three game and could not qualify for the playoffs.

From 2008 to 2020, the team was known as GS Pétroliers as it was part of the multi-sports club with that name.

The team's name changed back to MC Alger in 2020.

== Roster (Men) ==
Note: Flags indicate national team eligibility at FIBA-sanctioned events. Players may hold other non-FIBA nationalities not displayed.

MC Alger roster
Players
Coaches

| Pos. | No. | Nat. | Name | Ht. | Age |
|---|---|---|---|---|---|
| | 00 | (Algeria) | Merahi, Ramzi | 2.01 m (6 ft 7 in) | 30 – 7 January 1995 |
| | 1 | (Algeria) | Zergoug, Mohamed |
| | 2 | (Algeria) | Aggoun, Oussama | 1.97 m (6 ft 6 in) | 31 – 10 May 1994 |
| | 3 | (Algeria) | Guemat, Mohamed Zaki | 1.80 m (5 ft 11 in) | 31 – 7 September 1993 |
| C | 5 | (Algeria) | Adrar, Mustapha (C) | 2.03 m (6 ft 8 in) | 43 – 12 April 1982 |
| | 6 | (Algeria) | Bourkaib, Merouane | 1.80 m (5 ft 11 in) | 33 – 9 February 1992 |
| | 7 | (Algeria) | Beremila, Mehdi |
| | 10 | (Algeria) | Brahimi, Hamza |
| | 11 | (Algeria) | Derris, Mahdi |
| | 21 | (Algeria) | Didi, Imad |
| PF | 33 | (Algeria) | Dekkiche, Abdesslem | 1.96 m (6 ft 5 in) | 39 – 27 February 1986 |
| | 77 | (Algeria) | Oulamara, Djamel Eddine |

Head coach

- (Algeria) Maamar Berriche

Assistant coach(es)

- (Algeria) Jassem Bailiche

Legend

- (C) Team captain
- (I) Import player
- Injured

== Season-by-season record ==
| Season | Regular season | | | | | | Playoffs | Algerian Cup | African competitions | | |
| Season | Division | Pos | Pts | P | W | L | Playoffs | Algerian Cup | African competitions | | |
|---|---|---|---|---|---|---|---|---|---|---|---|
| 1988–89 | Super Division A | 1st | | | | | | Winners | | | |
| 1989–90 | Super Division A | | | | | | | | | | |
| 1990–91 | Super Division A | | | | | | | Semifinalist | | | |
| 1991–92 | Super Division A | | | | | | | | | | |
| 1992–93 | Super Division A | | | | | | | Winners | | | |
| 1993–94 | Super Division A | | | | | | | | | | |
| 1994–95 | Super Division A | | | | | | | Runner-up | | | |
| 1995–96 | Super Division A | | | | | | Semi-finals | | | | |
| 1996–97 | Super Division A | 5th | 25 | 16 | 9 | 7 | Quarter-finals | Round of 16 | | | |
| 1997–98 | Super Division A | 3rd | 28 | 17 | 11 | 6 | Semi-finals | Runner-up | | | |
| 1998–99 | Super Division A | | | | | | | | | | |
| 1999–00 | Super Division A | 2nd | 40 | 22 | 18 | 4 | 1st | | | | |
| 2000–01 | Super Division A | 1st | | | | | | Runner-up | | | |
| 2001–02 | Super Division A | | | | | | 2nd | | | | |
| 2002–03 | Super Division A | | | | | | 1st | Winners | | | |
| 2003–04 | Super Division A | 1st | | | | | | Winners | | | |
| 2004–05 | Super Division A | 1st | | | | | | Winners | | | |
| 2005–06 | Super Division A | 1st | | | | | | Winners | | | |
| 2006–07 | Super Division A | 2nd | | | | | | Round of 16 | | | |
| 2007–08 | Super Division A | 1st | 52 | 26 | 26 | 0 | 1st | Winners | | | |
| 2008–09 | Super Division A | 2nd | 20 | 10 | 10 | 0 | 2nd | Runner-up | | | |
| 2009–10 | Super Division A | 1st | 30 | 15 | 15 | 0 | 1st | | | | |
| 2010–11 | Super Division A | 1st | 60 | 30 | 30 | 0 | 1st | Winners | | | |
| 2011–12 | Super Division A | 1st | 58 | 30 | 28 | 2 | — | Winners | | | |
| 2012–13 | Super Division A | 2nd | 33 | 18 | 16 | 2 | 2nd | Winners | | | |
| 2013–14 | Super Division A | 1st | 35 | 18 | 17 | 1 | 1st | Winners | | | |
| 2014–15 | Super Division A | 1st | 47 | 24 | 23 | 1 | 1st | Winners | | | |
| 2015–16 | Super Division A | 1st | 50 | 26 | 24 | 2 | 1st | Winners | | | |
| 2016–17 | Super Division A | 1st | 28 | 14 | 14 | 0 | 1st | Winners | 1 Champions Cup | 6th | 4–3 |
| 2017–18 | National 1 | 1st | 57 | 30 | 27 | 6 | 1st | Winners | 2 Champions Cup | 8th | 3–5 |
| 2018–19 | National 1 | 1st | 15 | 0 | 13 | 2 | | Winners | | | |
| 2019–20 | National 1 | Canceled (Note: On March 15, 2020, the Ministry of Youth and Sports decided to stop the season due to the COVID-19 pandemic in Algeria.) | | | | | | | | | |
| 2020–21 | National 1 | Canceled | | | | | | | 1 BAL | RS | 0–3 |
| 2021–22 | Super Division | | 0 | 0 | 0 | 0 | | Semifinalist (Note: The Algerian Basketball Federation (FABB) decided to cancel the Algerian Cup for this season and replace it with the Coupe Fédérale, in which only the 20 teams in the Super Division competed.) | | | |
| 2022–23 | Super Division | | 0 | 0 | 0 | 0 | | | | | |
| 2023–24 | Super Division | 3rd | 52 | 30 | 24 | 6 | 3rd | Quarterfinalist | | | |

== Honours ==
=== National ===
Super Division

- Champions (21): 1983, 1985, 1986, 1987, 1989, 2000, 2001, 2003, 2004, 2005, 2006, 2008, 2010, 2011, 2012, 2014, 2015, 2016, 2017, 2018, 2019

Algerian Cup

- Champions (20):1983, 1985, 1986, 1989, 1993, 2003, 2004, 2005, 2006, 2008, 2009, 2011, 2012, 2013, 2014, 2015, 2016, 2017, 2018, 2019

=== International ===
Arab Championship

- Runners-up (4): 1987, 2001, 2002, 2015
  - Third place (1): 2004
