= CSM Constantine =

Algerian basketball team

CSM Constantine is an Algerian professional basketball team located in Constantine, Algeria. The team currently competes in the Algerian Basketball Championship.

== Notable players ==
- (Chad) Abderamane Mbaindiguim
