= Olympique Batna =

- League: Algerian Basketball Championship
- Founded: 1972
- History: MB Batna; 1977; MSP Batna; 1992–2005; Olympique Batna; 2005–present
- Arena: Stadium November 1st, 1954
- Location: Batna, Algeria
- Head coach: Kulib Salim

Olympique Batna is an Algerian basketball club based in Batna. Established in 1972, the team plays in the Algerian Basketball Championship.

== History ==
The team was founded by Brahim Yezza, Khomri Miloud and Kaouli Chérif in 1972.

== Notable players ==
Note: Flags indicate national team eligibility at FIBA-sanctioned events. Players may hold other non-FIBA nationalities not displayed.

Criteria

To appear in this section a player must have either:

- Set a club record or won an individual award while at the club
- Played at least one official international match for their national team at any time
- Played at least one official NBA match at any time.

- (Senegal) Mamadou Faye
