= 2023 in basketball =

The following are the basketball events of the year 2023 throughout the world.

The following are basketball events that took place in, or are scheduled for, 2023 throughout the world. Tournaments include international (FIBA), professional (club), and amateur and collegiate levels.

== International tournaments ==
=== National senior team tournaments ===
For tournaments hosted by multiple nations, the host of the final match is listed first.

Tournament	Host cities	Duration	(gold) Champion	(silver) Second place	(bronze) Third place
2023 FIBA Basketball World Cup	(Philippines) Metro Manila (Japan) Okinawa City (Indonesia) Jakarta	August 25 – September 10	Germany	Serbia	Canada
EuroBasket Women 2023	(Slovenia) Ljubljana (Israel) Tel Aviv	June 15 – 25	Belgium	Spain	France

=== 3X3 championships ===
==== Men ====
Tournament	Host city	Duration	(gold) Champion	(silver) Second place	(bronze) Third place
2023 FIBA 3x3 World Cup	(Austria) Vienna	May 30 – June 4	Serbia	United States	Latvia
2023 FIBA 3x3 Asia Cup	Singapore	March 29 – April 2	Mongolia	Australia	New Zealand

==== Women ====
Tournament	Host city	Duration	(gold) Champion	(silver) Second place	(bronze) Third place
2023 FIBA 3x3 World Cup	(Austria) Vienna	May 30 – June 4	United States	France	Australia
2023 FIBA 3x3 Asia Cup	Singapore	March 29 – April 2	Australia	New Zealand	China

== Professional club seasons ==
=== FIBA Intercontinental Cup ===
Champion	Runner-up	Result	Playoff format
(Spain) Lenovo Tenerife	(Brazil) São Paulo	89–68	Single-game final

=== Continental seasons ===
==== Men ====
Organizer	Tournament	Champion	Runner-up	Result	Playoff format
Euroleague Basketball	2022–23 EuroLeague	(Spain) Real Madrid	(Greece) Olympiacos	79–78	Single-game final
Euroleague Basketball	2022–23 EuroCup Basketball	(Spain) Gran Canaria	(Turkey) Türk Telekom	71–67	Single-game final
FIBA	2022–23 Basketball Champions League	(Germany) Telekom Baskets Bonn	(Israel) Hapoel Jerusalem	77–70	Single-game final
FIBA	2022–23 BCL Americas	(Brazil) Sesi Franca	(Brazil) Flamengo	88–79	Single-game final
FIBA	2022–23 FIBA Europe Cup	(Poland) Anwil Włocławek	(France) Cholet Basket	161–155	Best on aggregate
NBA/FIBA	2023 BAL season	(Egypt) Al Ahly	(Senegal) AS Douanes	80–65	Single-game final

==== Women ====
Organizer	Tournament	Champion	Runner-up	Result	Playoff format
FIBA	2022–23 EuroLeague Women	(Turkey) Fenerbahçe	(Turkey) ÇBK Mersin Yenişehir Bld.	99–60	Single-game final
FIBA	2022–23 EuroCup Women	(France) LDLC Asvel Féminin	(Turkey) Galatasaray	180–113	Best on aggregate

=== Regional seasons ===
==== Men ====
Region	League	Champion	Runner-up	Result	Playoff format
Former Yugoslavia	2022–23 ABA League	(Serbia) Partizan Mozzart Bet	(Serbia) Crvena zvezda Meridianbet	3–2	Best-of-5 series
Former Yugoslavia	2022–23 ABA 2nd League	(Slovenia) Krka	(Slovenia) Helios Suns	83–82	Single-game final
Alpe-Adria	2022–23 Alpe Adria Cup	(Poland) MKS Dąbrowa Górnicza	(Austria) GGMT Vienna	86–72	Single-game final
East Asia and Philippines	2023 EASL Champions Week	(South Korea) Anyang KGC	(South Korea) Seoul SK Knights	90–84	Single-game final
Estonia and Latvia (Note: A team from Ukraine also participated in 2022–23.)	2022–23 Latvian–Estonian Basketball League	(Ukraine) Prometey	(Latvia) VEF Rīga	77–62	Single-game final
Balkans	2022–23 BIBL	(Israel) Hapoel Be'er Sheva/Dimona	(Kosovo) Peja	99–95	Single-game final
Belgium and Netherlands	2022–23 BNXT League	(Netherlands) ZZ Leiden	(Belgium) Oostende	2–1	Best-of-3 series
Belgium and Netherlands	2023 BNXT Supercup				Single-game final
Southeast Asia, Hong Kong, and Macau	2023 ABL Invitational	Hong Kong Eastern	(Vietnam) Saigon Heat	3–0	Best-of-3 series

==== Women ====
Region	League	Champion	Runner-up	Result	Playoff format
Southeast Europe	2022–23 WABA League	(Slovenia) Cinkarna Celje	(Montenegro) Budućnost Bemax	66–64	Single-game final

== Domestic league seasons ==
=== Men ===
==== Europe ====
Nation	Tournament	Champion	Runner-up	Result	Playoff format
Albania	2022–23 Albanian Basketball League				Best-of-5 series
Albania	2023 Albanian Basketball Cup				
Albania	2023 Albanian Basketball Supercup				
Armenia	2022–23 Armenia Basketball League A				
Austria	2022–23 Österreichische Basketball Bundesliga season				Best-of-5 series
Austria	2022–23 Austrian Basketball Cup				Single-game final
Austria	2023 Austrian Basketball Supercup				
Azerbaijan	2022–23 Azerbaijan Basketball League				
Belarus	2022–23 Belarusian Premier League				Best-of-5 series
Belgium	2023 BNXT League Belgian Playoffs	Oostende	Antwerp Giants	3–1	Best-of-5 series
Belgium	2022–23 Belgian Basketball Cup				Single-game final
Belgium	2023 Belgian Basketball Supercup				
Bosnia and Herzegovina	2022–23 Basketball Championship of Bosnia and Herzegovina	Igokea	Borac WWIN	3–0	Best-of-5 series
Bosnia and Herzegovina	2022–23 Mirza Delibašić Cup	Igokea	Široki	76–49	Single-game final
Bulgaria	2022–23 National Basketball League	Balkan Botevgrad	Chernomorets	3–0	Best-of-5 series
Bulgaria	2023 Bulgarian Basketball Cup				Single-game final
Croatia	2022–23 Hrvatski telekom Premijer liga				Best-of-5 series
Croatia	2022–23 Krešimir Ćosić Cup				
Cyprus	2022–23 Cyprus Basketball Division A				Best-of-5 series
Cyprus	2022–23 Cypriot Basketball Cup				
Czech Republic	2022–23 NBL (Czech Republic)				Best-of-5 series
Czech Republic	2022–23 Czech Republic Basketball Cup				Single-game final
Denmark	2022–23 Basketligaen				Best-of-7 series
Denmark	2022–23 Danish Basketball Cup				Single-game final
England	2022–23 National Basketball League Division 1	Hemel Storm	Worthing Thunder	69–63	Single-game final
England	2022–23 National Basketball League Division 2	City of Birmingham Rockets	St Helens Saints	80–72	Single-game final
England	2022–23 National Basketball League Division 3	Milton Keynes Breakers	UEL London Lions	113–67	Single-game final
Estonia	2022–23 Estonian Championship	BC Kalev/Cramo	Tartu Ülikool Maks & Moorits	3–0	Best-of-5 series
Finland	2022–23 Korisliiga season				
Finland	2022–23 Finnish Basketball Cup				
France (Note: Includes one team from Monaco.)	2022–23 Pro A season	AS Monaco	Metropolitans 92	3–0	Best-of-5 series
France	2022–23 French Basketball Cup				
France	2023 Leaders Cup				
Georgia	2022–23 Georgian Superliga				
Germany	2022–23 Basketball Bundesliga	Ratiopharm Ulm	Telekom Baskets Bonn	3–1	Best-of-5 series
Germany	2022–23 BBL-Pokal				Single-game final
Great Britain	2022–23 BBL	London Lions	Leicester Riders	88–80	Single-game final
Great Britain	2022–23 BBL Cup	London Lions	Leicester Riders	79–71	Single-game final
Great Britain	2022–23 BBL Trophy	Caledonia Gladiators	Cheshire Phoenix	73–70	Single-game final
Greece	2022–23 Greek Basket League	Olympiacos	Panathinaikos	3–1	Best-of-5 series
Greece	2022–23 Greek Basketball Cup	Olympiacos	Peristeri B.C.	85–57	Single-game final
Greece	2023 Greek Basketball Super Cup				
Hungary	2022–23 Nemzeti Bajnokság I/A				
Hungary	2023 Magyar Kupa				
Iceland	2022–23 Úrvalsdeild karla	Tindastóll	Valur	3–2	Best-of-5 series
Iceland	2022–23 Icelandic Basketball Cup				
Ireland	2022–23 Super League				
Israel	2022–23 Israeli Basketball Premier League	Maccabi Tel Aviv	Hapoel Tel Aviv	2–1	Best-of-3 series
Israel	2022–23 Israeli Basketball State Cup	Hapoel Jerusalem	Maccabi Tel Aviv	67–61	SIngle-game final
Israel	2023 Israeli Basketball League Cup				
Italy	2022–23 LBA	EA7 Emporio Armani Milano	Virtus Segafredo Bologna	4–3	Best-of-7 series
Italy	2023 Italian Basketball Cup				
Italy	2023 Italian Basketball Supercup				
Kosovo	2022–23 Kosovo Basketball Superleague				
Kosovo	2022–23 Kosovo Basketball Cup				
Latvia	2022–23 Latvian Basketball League	(Ukraine) BC Prometey	VEF Rīga	77–62	Single-game final
Lithuania	2022–23 LKL season	Žalgiris	Rytas	3–1	Best-of-5 series
Lithuania	2022–23 King Mindaugas Cup				
Luxembourg	2022–23 Total League season				
Moldova	2022–23 Moldovan National Division				
Montenegro	2022–23 Prva A liga				
Montenegro	2022–23 Montenegrin Basketball Cup				
Netherlands	2023 BNXT League Dutch Playoffs	ZZ Leiden	Donar	3–2	Best-of-5 series
Netherlands	2022–23 Dutch Basketball Cup				Single-game final
Netherlands	2023 Dutch Basketball Supercup				
North Macedonia	2022–23 Macedonian First League				
North Macedonia	2022–23 Macedonian Basketball Cup				
Norway	2022–23 BLNO season				
Poland	2022–23 PLK season	King Szczecin	WKS Śląsk Wrocław	4–2	Best-of-7 series
Poland	2023 Polish Basketball Cup				
Poland	2023 Polish Basketball Supercup				
Portugal	2022–23 LPB season				
Portugal	2022–23 Portuguese Basketball Cup				Single-game final
Portugal	2022–23 Portuguese Basketball League Cup				Single-game final
Portugal	2022–23 Portuguese Basketball Super Cup				Single-game final
Romania	2022–23 Liga Națională				
Romania	2023 Romanian Basketball Cup				
Russia	2022–23 VTB United League (Note: Includes one team each from Belarus and Kazakhstan. The highest-ranked team from Russia is also named as Russian Champions.)				
Russia	2022–23 Russian Basketball Cup				
Scotland	2022–23 Scottish Basketball Championship				Best on aggregate
Scotland	2022–23 Scottish Cup				Single-game final
Serbia	2022–23 Basketball League of Serbia	Crvena zvezda Meridianbet	FMP Soccerbet	2–0	Best-of-3 series
Serbia	2022–23 Second Basketball League of Serbia	SPD Radnički	Joker	League standings	
Serbia	2022–23 Radivoj Korać Cup				Single-game final
Slovakia	2022–23 Slovak Basketball League				
Slovakia	2022–23 Slovak Basketball Cup				
Slovenia	2022–23 Slovenian Basketball League				
Slovenia	2022–23 Slovenian Basketball Cup				
Slovenia	2023 Slovenian Basketball Supercup				
Spain (Note: Includes one team from Andorra.)	2022–23 ACB season	Barça	Real Madrid	3–0	Best-of-5 series
Spain	2023 Copa del Rey de Baloncesto	Unicaja	Lenovo Tenerife	83–80	Single-game final
Spain	2023 Supercopa de España de Baloncesto	Real Madrid	Unicaja	88–81	Single-game final
Sweden	2022–23 Basketligan season				Best-of-7 final
Sweden	2022–23 Superettan				
Switzerland	2022–23 SBL				
Switzerland	2022–23 SBL Cup				
Turkey	2022–23 Basketbol Süper Ligi	Anadolu Efes	Pinar Karşıyaka	3–0	Best-of-5 final
Turkey	2023 Turkish Basketball Cup	Cancelled due to the 2023 Turkey–Syria earthquakes			
Turkey	2023 Turkish Basketball Presidential Cup	Cancelled due to the 2023 Turkey–Syria earthquakes			
Ukraine	2022–23 Ukrainian Basketball SuperLeague	Not held due to the Russian invasion of Ukraine			
Ukraine	2022–23 Ukrainian Basketball Cup	Not held due to the Russian invasion of Ukraine			

==== Asia ====
Nation	Tournament	Champion	Runner-up	Result	Playoff format
Bahrain	2022–23 Bahraini Premier League				Best-of-3 series
China	2022–23 Chinese Basketball Association season	Liaoning Flying Leopards	Zhejiang Golden Bulls	4–0	Best-of-7 series
China	2023 National Basketball League				Best-of-3 series
Hong Kong	2023 Hong Kong A1 Division Championship				
India	2023 UBA Pro Basketball League				
Indonesia	2023 IBL Indonesia	Prawira Bandung	Pelita Jaya Bakrie	2–0	Best-of-3 series
Iran	2022–23 Iranian Basketball Super League	Shahrdari Gorgan	Kalleh Mazandaran	2–0	Best-of-3 series
Iraq	2022–23 Iraqi Basketball Premier League	Al-Naft	Al-Shorta	4–2	Best-of-7 series
Japan	2022–23 B.League season (B1 League)	Ryukyu Golden Kings	Chiba Jets	2–0	Best-of-3 series
Japan	2022–23 B.League season (B2 League)				
Japan	2022–23 B.League season (B3 League)				
Jordan	2022–23 Jordanian Premier Basketball League				Best-of-3 series
Kazakhstan	2022–23 Kazakhstan Basketball Championship				Best-of-5 series
Kuwait	2022–23 Kuwaiti Division 1 Basketball League				Best-of-5 series
Lebanon	2022–23 Lebanese Basketball League	Al Riyadi	Dynamo	4–1	Best-of-7 series
Lebanon	2023 Lebanese Basketball Cup				
Palestine	2022–23 Palestine Premier League				Single-game final
Philippines	2022–23 PBA Commissioner's Cup	Barangay Ginebra San Miguel	Bay Area Dragons	4–3	Best-of-7 series
Philippines	2023 PBA Governors' Cup	TNT Tropang Giga	Barangay Ginebra San Miguel	4–2	Best-of-7 series
Qatar	2022–23 Qatari Basketball League				Best-of-3 series
Saudi Arabia	2022–23 Saudi Premier League (basketball)				Single-game final
Saudi Arabia	2022–23 Saudi Basketball First Division			League standings	
South Korea	2022–23 KBL season				Best-of-7 series
Syria	2022–23 Syrian Basketball League season				Best-of-5 series
Taiwan	2022–23 T1 League season	New Taipei CTBC DEA	Tainan TSG GhostHawks	4–0	Best-of-5 series
Taiwan	2022–23 P League+				Best-of-5 series
Thailand	2023 Thailand Basketball League				
United Arab Emirates	2022–23 UAE National Basketball League				Best-of-5 series
Vietnam	2023 VBA season	Saigon Heat	Nha Trang Dolphins	3–1	Best-of-5 series

==== Americas ====
Nation	Tournament	Champion	Runner-up	Result	Playoff format
Argentina	2022–23 Liga Nacional de Básquet season				Best-of-5 series
Brazil	2022–23 NBB season				Best-of-5 series
Bolivia	2023 Libobasquet season				Best-of-5 season
Canada	2023 NBL Canada season				
Canada	2023 CEBL season				Single-game final
Chile	2023 Liga Nacional de Básquetbol de Chile				Best-of-7 series
Colombia	2023 Baloncesto Profesional Colombiano season (Apertura)				Best-of-5 series
Cuba	2023 Liga Superior de Baloncesto season				Best-of-5 series
Mexico	2023 CIBACOPA season				
United States (Note: The NBA and the G League each include one team from Canada.)	2022–23 NBA season	Denver Nuggets	Miami Heat	4–1	Best-of-7 series
United States	2022–23 NBA G League season	Delaware Blue Coats	Rio Grande Valley Vipers	2–0	Best-of-3 series
United States	2023 NBA Summer League	Cleveland Cavaliers	Houston Rockets	99–78	Single-game final
United States	2023 NBA in-season tournament	Los Angeles Lakers	Indiana Pacers	123–109	Single-game final
Uruguay	2022–23 LUB season				Best-of-7 series
Venezuela	2022–23 Venezuelan SuperLiga				

==== African ====
Nation	Tournament	Champion	Runner-up	Result	Playoff format
Algeria	2022–23 Algerian Basketball Championship				Single-game final
Algeria	2022–23 Algerian Basketball Cup				Single-game final
Angola	2022–23 Angolan Basketball League				Best-of-5 series
Angola	2022–23 Angolan Cup				Single-game final
Angola	2023 Angolan Supercup				
Benin	2022–23 Benin Professional Basketball League				Single-game final
Botswana	2023 BBA season				
Cape Verde	202 C3BVL season				Best-of-3 series
Cameroon	2022–23 Elite Messieurs			Final Four standings	
Cameroon	2023 Cup of Cameroon				Single-game final
Egypt	2022–23 Egyptian Basketball Super League				Best-of-5 series
Egypt	2022–23 Egypt Basketball Cup				Single-game final
Egypt	2022–23 Egyptian Super Cup				
Ivory Coast	2023 Ivory Coast National Basketball Championship				Best-of-3 series
Kenya	2022–23 KBF Premier League				Best-of-5 series
Libya	2022–23 Libyan Division I Basketball League			League standings	
Libya	2023 Libyan Basketball Cup				
Madagascar	2022 N1A season				
Mali	2022–23 Ligue 1				
Mali	2023 Malian Cup				
Morocco	2022–23 Division Excellence				Best-of-3 series
Morocco	2022–23 Moroccan Throne Cup				Single-game final
Mozambique	2023 Liga Moçambicana de Basquetebol				Best-of-5 series
Nigeria	2023 NBBF President Cup				
Rwanda	2022–23 RBL season				
Rwanda	2022–23 RBL Division 2 season				Single-game final
Senegal	2023 Nationale 1 season				
Senegal	2023 Coupe Saint Michel				Single-game final
Senegal	2023 Senegalese Basketball Cup				
Senegal	2023 Senegalese Mayor's Cup				
Tunisia	2022–23 Championnat National A				Best-of-5 series
Tunisia	2023 Tunisian Basketball Cup				Single-game final
Uganda	2023 NBL Uganda season				

==== Oceania ====
Nation	Tournament	Champion	Runner-up	Result	Playoff format
Australia (Note: The Australia-based NBL has featured a New Zealand team throughout its history.)	2022–23 NBL season	Sydney Kings	New Zealand Breakers	3–2	Best-of-5 series
New Zealand	2023 New Zealand NBL season	Canterbury Rams	Auckland Tuatara	93-82	Single-game final

==== Other countries ====
Nation	Tournament	Champion	Runner-up	Result	Playoff format
North Cyprus	2022–23 Erkekler Basketbol Süper Ligi				

=== Women ===
==== Europe ====
Nation	Tournament	Champion	Runner-up	Result	Playoff format
Albania	2022–23 Albanian A-1 League				
Albania	2023 Albanian Basketball Cup				
Albania	2023 Albanian Basketball Supercup				
Austria	2022–23 Austrian Women's Basketball Bundesliga				
Belarus	2022–23 Belarus Women's premier League				
Belgium	2022–23 Belgian Women's Basketball League				
Bosnia and Herzegovina	2022–23 Basketball Championship of Bosnia and Herzegovina League				
Bosnia and Herzegovina	2022–23 Basketball Cup of Bosnia and Herzegovina				
Bulgaria	2023 Bulgarian Women's Basketball Championship				
Bulgaria	2023 Bulgarian Women's Basketball Cup				
Croatia	2022–23 Croatian First Women's Basketball League				
Croatia	2022–23 Ružica Meglaj-Rimac Cup				
Cyprus	2022–23 Cyprus Women's Basketball Division A				
Czech Republic	2022–23 Czech Women's Basketball League				
Denmark	2023 Dameligaen				
Denmark	2022–23 Danish Women's Basketball Cup				
Estonia	2022–23 Women's Korvpalli Meistriliiga				
Finland	2022–23 Naisten Korisliiga				
France	2022–23 Ligue Féminine de Basketball				
Germany	2022–23 Damen-Basketball-Bundesliga				
Germany	2022–23 German Women's Basketball Cup				
United Kingdom	2022–23 WBBL				
United Kingdom	2022–23 WBBL Cup				
Greece	2022–23 Greek Women's Basketball League				
Greece	2022–23 Greek Women's Basketball Cup				
Greece	2022–23 A2 National Women's Basketball				
Hungary	2022–23 Nemzeti Bajnokság I/A				Best-of-5 series
Iceland	2022–23 Úrvalsdeild kvenna				Best-of-5 series
Iceland	2022–23 Icelandic Women's Basketball Cup	Haukar	Keflavík	94–66	Single-game final
Iceland	2023 Icelandic Women's Basketball Supercup				Single-game final
Ireland	2022–23 Women's Super League				
Israel	2022–23 Israeli Female Basketball Premier League				
Italy	2022–23 Lega Basket Femminile				
Kosovo	2022–23 ETC Women's Superleague				
Latvia	2023 LSBL Championships				
Lithuania	2022–23 Lithuanian Women's Basketball League				
Luxembourg	2022–23 Nationale 1 Dames				
North Macedonia	2022–23 First Women's Basketball League of Macedonia				
North Macedonia	2022–23 Macedonian Women's Basketball Cup				
Montenegro	2022–23 First A Women's Basketball League of Montenegro				
Montenegro	2022–23 Montenegrin Women's Basketball Cup				
Netherlands	2022–23 Women's Basketball League				
Norway	2022–23 Women's BLNO				
Poland	2022–23 Basket Liga Kobiet				
Portugal	2022–23 Liga Feminina de Basquetebol				
Portugal	2022–23 Portuguese Women's Basketball Cup				
Romania	2022–23 Liga Națională				
Romania	2023 Cupa României				
Russia	2022–23 Russian Women's Basketball Premier League				
Serbia	2022–23 First Women's Basketball League of Serbia	Crvena zvezda	Kraljevo	3–2	Best-of-5 series
Serbia	2022–23 Milan Ciga Vasojević Cup	Crvena zvezda	Art Basket	77–55	Single-game final
Slovakia	2022–23 Slovak Women's Basketball Extraliga				
Slovenia	2022–23 Slovenian Women's Basketball League				
Slovenia	2022–23 Slovenian Women's Basketball Cup				
Spain	2022–23 Liga Femenina de Baloncesto				
Spain	2023 Copa de la Reina de Baloncesto				
Spain	2023 Supercopa de España de Baloncesto Femenino				
Spain	2022–23 Liga Femenina 2 de Baloncesto				
Sweden	2022–23 Basketligan dam				
Switzerland	2022–23 Swiss Women's Basketball Championship				
Turkey	2022–23 Women's Basketball Super League	Fenerbahçe	ÇBK Mersin Yenişehir Bld.	3–0	Best-of-5 series
Turkey	2022–23 Turkish Women's Basketball Cup				
Turkey	2023 Turkish Women's Basketball Presidential Cup				
Ukraine	2022–23 Ukrainian Women's Basketball SuperLeague	Not held due to the Russian invasion of Ukraine			

==== Asia ====
Nation	Tournament	Champion	Runner-up	Result	Playoff format
China	2023 WCBA season				
Japan	2022–23 Women's Japan Basketball League				
South Korea	2022–23 Women's Korean Basketball League				
Taiwan	2023 Women's Super Basketball League				

==== Americas ====
Nation	Tournament	Champion	Runner-up	Result	Playoff format
United States	2023 WNBA season	Las Vegas Aces	New York Liberty	3–1	Best-of-5 series
United States	2023 WNBA Commissioner's Cup	New York Liberty	Las Vegas Aces	82–63	Single-game final

==== Oceania ====
Nation	Tournament	Champion	Runner-up	Result	Playoff format
Australia	2022–23 WNBL season	Townsville Fire	Southside Flyers	2–0	Best-of-3 series

== College/university seasons ==
=== Men's ===
Nation	League / Tournament	Champions	Runners-up	Result	Playoff format
Canada	2023 U Sports Men's Basketball Championship	Carleton Ravens	St. Francis Xavier X-Men	109–104 (2 OT)	Single-game final
Philippines	UAAP Season 85	Ateneo Blue Eagles	UP Fighting Maroons	2–1	Best-of-3 series
United States	NCAA Division I	UConn Huskies	San Diego State Aztecs	76–59	Single-game final
United States	National Invitation Tournament	North Texas Mean Green	UAB Blazers	68–61	Single-game final
United States	NCAA Division II	Nova Southeastern Sharks	West Liberty Hilltoppers	111–101	Single-game final
United States	NCAA Division III	Christopher Newport Captains	Mount Union Purple Raiders	74–72	Single-game final
United States	NAIA	College of Idaho Yotes	Indiana Tech Warriors	73–71	Single-game final

=== Women's ===
Nation	League / Tournament	Champions	Runners-up	Result	Playoff format
Canada	2023 U Sports Women's Basketball Championship	Carleton Ravens	Queen's Gaels	71–59	Single-game final
Philippines	UAAP Season 85	NU Lady Bulldogs	De La Salle Lady Archers	2–0	Best-of-3 series
United States	NCAA Division I	LSU Tigers	Iowa Hawkeyes	102–85	Single-game final
United States	Women's National Invitation Tournament	Kansas Jayhawks	Columbia Lions	66–59	Single-game final
United States	NCAA Division II	Ashland Eagles	Minnesota Duluth Bulldogs	78–67	Single-game final
United States	NCAA Division III	Transylvania Pioneers	Christopher Newport Captains	57–52	Single-game final
United States	NAIA	Clarke Pride	Thomas More Saints	63–52	Single-game final

== Deaths ==
- January 9 — Cincy Powell, 80, American ABA player (Dallas Chaparrals, Kentucky Colonels, Utah Stars, Virginia Squires).
- January 15 — George McLeod, 92, American NBA player (Baltimore Bullets).
- January 15 — Ruslan Otverchenko, 33, Ukrainian player (Budivelnyk).
- January 17 — Chris Ford, 74, American NBA player (Detroit Pistons, Boston Celtics) and coach (Boston Celtics, Milwaukee Bucks, Los Angeles Clippers, Philadelphia 76ers).
- January 28 – Hershell West, 82, American college player (Grambling State).
- March 11 - Bud Grant, 95.
- March 21 – Willis Reed, 80, American NBA player (New York Knicks).
- April 12 — James Bradley, 67, American college player (Memphis).
- May 23 - Cotton Nash, 80.
- October 9 – Terry Dischinger, 82, American NBA player (Detroit Pistons).
- October 24 – Elwood Plummer, 79, American college player (Jackson State) and coach (Prairie View A&M).
- November 1 – Bob Knight, 83, American Hall of Fame college coach (Army, Indiana, Texas Tech).
- November 2 – Walter Davis, 69, American NBA player (Phoenix Suns, Denver Nuggets).
- November 4 – L. C. Gordon, 86, American college player (Oklahoma State) and coach (Texas Southern).
- November 16 – Johnny Green, 89, American NBA player (New York Knicks).
- December 14 – George McGinnis, 73, American NBA player (Indiana Pacers).
- December 17 — Reggie Lacefield, 78, American ABA (Kentucky Colonels) and Eastern League (Wilmington Blue Bombers, Lancaster Red Roses).
- December 17 — Eric Montross, 52, All-American college player and national champion (North Carolina, 1993), NBA player (Boston Celtics).
- December 23 — Samboy Lim, 61, Filipino PBA player (San Miguel Beermen).
