= 2022–23 Real Madrid Baloncesto season =

Real Madrid
2022–23 season
- President: (Spain) Florentino Pérez
- Head coach: (Spain) Chus Mateo
- Arena: WiZink Center
- Liga ACB: Runners-up
- EuroLeague: Winners
- Copa del Rey: Semi-finals
- Supercopa de España: Winners
- Highest home attendance: Liga ACB: 11,965; Real Madrid 82–93 Barcelona (20 June 2023) EuroLeague: 12,867; Real Madrid 98–94 Partizan (10 May 2023)
- Lowest home attendance: Liga ACB: 5,517; Real Madrid 103–89 Manresa (11 December 2022) EuroLeague: 6,381; Real Madrid 95–91 Valencia (9 March 2023)
- Average home attendance: Liga ACB: 7,560; EuroLeague: 8,141
- Biggest win: Real Madrid 93–57 UCAM Murcia (20 November 2022)
- Biggest defeat: Breogán 96–72 Real Madrid (8 April 2023)
Home	Away

The 2022–23 season was Real Madrid's 92nd in existence, their 67th consecutive season in the top flight of Spanish basketball and 16th consecutive season in the EuroLeague. It was also the first season since 2010–11 without Pablo Laso, one of the most successful coaches in the club's history.

Times up to 30 October 2022 and from 26 March 2023 are CEST (UTC+2). Times from 30 October 2022 to 26 March 2023 are CET (UTC+1).

== Overview ==
=== Pre-season ===
After winning their 36th Spanish title in the previous season, Real Madrid faced a summer of changes. The club part ways with three players – Trey Thompkins, Jeffery Taylor and Thomas Heurtel – in the span of 4 days, between 25 and 29 June 2022. The most meaningful change was the replacement of the legendary head coach Pablo Laso, who had suffered a heart attack, with Chus Mateo, as the club deemed Laso's continuity to be too risky for his health given his condition.

On 6 and 7 July 2022, Real Madrid announced that Fabien Causeur and captain Sergio Llull had extended their contracts through 2024. Five days later, the club announced that Rudy Fernández had renewed through 2023.

On 14 July 2022, Real Madrid announced Džanan Musa, last season's ACB MVP, as the club's first signing in the post-Laso era. Four days later, Sergio Rodríguez returned to Madrid on a 1-year deal. On 21 July, Mario Hezonja became Real Madrid's third addition. On 27 July, Petr Cornelie signed for one year with Madrid.

== Players ==
=== Squad information ===
Note: Flags indicate national team eligibility at FIBA-sanctioned events. Players may hold other non-FIBA nationalities not displayed.

Real Madrid roster
Players
Coaches

Pos.	No.	Nat.	Name	Ht.	Wt.	Age
G	0	(United States)	Williams-Goss, Nigel	1.91 m (6 ft 3 in)	87 kg (192 lb)	32 – 16 September 1994
SG	1	(France)	Causeur, Fabien	1.96 m (6 ft 5 in)	86 kg (190 lb)	39 – 16 June 1987
F/C	3	(United States) (Slovenia)	Randolph, Anthony	2.11 m (6 ft 11 in)	104 kg (229 lb)	37 – 15 July 1989
G/F	5	(Spain)	Fernández, Rudy	1.96 m (6 ft 5 in)	83 kg (183 lb)	41 – 4 April 1985
SF	6	(Spain)	Abalde, Alberto	2.02 m (6 ft 8 in)	95 kg (209 lb)	30 – 15 December 1995
SF	8	(Hungary)	Hanga, Ádám	2.00 m (6 ft 7 in)	96 kg (212 lb)	37 – 12 April 1989
F	11	(Croatia)	Hezonja, Mario	2.03 m (6 ft 8 in)	110 kg (243 lb)	31 – 25 February 1995
PG	12	(Spain)	Alocén, Carlos (injured)	1.94 m (6 ft 4 in)	84 kg (185 lb)	25 – 30 December 2000
PG	13	(Spain)	Rodríguez, Sergio	1.91 m (6 ft 3 in)	83 kg (183 lb)	40 – 12 June 1986
F	14	(Argentina)	Deck, Gabriel (injured)	1.98 m (6 ft 6 in)	105 kg (231 lb)	31 – 8 February 1995
C	17	(France)	Poirier, Vincent	2.13 m (7 ft 0 in)	110 kg (243 lb)	33 – 17 October 1993
F/C	21	(France)	Cornelie, Petr	2.11 m (6 ft 11 in)	108 kg (238 lb)	31 – 26 July 1995
C	22	(Cape Verde)	Tavares, Edy	2.20 m (7 ft 3 in)	125 kg (276 lb)	34 – 22 March 1992
G	23	(Spain)	Llull, Sergio (C)	1.90 m (6 ft 3 in)	94 kg (207 lb)	38 – 15 November 1987
PF	28	(France)	Yabusele, Guerschon	2.01 m (6 ft 7 in)	123 kg (271 lb)	30 – 17 December 1995
F/C	30	(Senegal) (Spain)	Ndiaye, Eli	2.04 m (6 ft 8 in)	83 kg (183 lb)	22 – 26 June 2004
G/F	31	(Bosnia and Herzegovina)	Musa, Džanan	2.05 m (6 ft 9 in)	101 kg (223 lb)	27 – 8 May 1999

Head coach

- (Spain) Chus Mateo

Assistant coach(es)

- (Spain) Paco Redondo
- (Spain) Isidoro Calin

Athletic trainer(s)

- (Spain) Juan Trapero

Legend

- (C) Team captain
- Injured

- Roster
Updated: 23 June 2023

=== Depth chart ===
Pos.	Starting 5	Bench 1	Bench 2	Bench 3	Inactive
C	Edy Tavares	Vincent Poirier		Eli Ndiaye
PF	Guerschon Yabusele	Anthony Randolph		Petr Cornelie	Gabriel Deck (injured)
SF	Mario Hezonja	Rudy Fernández	Ádám Hanga	Alberto Abalde
SG	Džanan Musa	Sergio Llull	Fabien Causeur
PG	Sergio Rodríguez	Nigel Williams-Goss			Carlos Alocén (injured)

=== Transactions ===
==== In ====
No.	Pos.	Nat.	Name	Age	Moving from		Type	Ends	Transfer fee	Date	Source
11	F	(Croatia)	Mario Hezonja	31	UNICS	(Russia)	Transfer	June 2024	Free	21 July 2022	
13	PG	(Spain)	Sergio Rodríguez	40	Olimpia Milano	(Italy)	Transfer	June 2023	Free	18 July 2022	
21	F/C	(France)	Petr Cornelie	31	Grand Rapids Gold	(United States)	Transfer	June 2023	Free	27 July 2022	
31	G/F	(Bosnia and Herzegovina)	Džanan Musa	27	Breogán	(Spain)	Transfer	June 2024	Free	14 July 2022	

==== Out ====
No.	Pos.	Nat.	Name	Age	Moving to		Type	Transfer fee	Date	Source
2	PG	(Spain)	Juan Núñez	22	Ratiopharm Ulm	(Germany)	Transfer	Free	15 August 2022	
4	PG	(France)	Thomas Heurtel	37	Zenit Saint Petersburg	(Russia)	End of contract	Free	29 June 2022	
7	G	(Slovenia)	Urban Klavžar	22	UCAM Murcia	(Spain)	Transfer	Undisclosed	9 July 2022	
33	PF	(United States)	Trey Thompkins	36	Zenit Saint Petersburg	(Russia)	End of contract	Free	27 June 2022	
44	G/F	(Sweden)	Jeffery Taylor	37	Wolves	(Lithuania)	End of contract	Free	25 June 2022	

== Pre-season and friendlies ==
=== Friendly matches ===
11 September 2022 Trofeo Costa del Sol	Unicaja	91–98	Real Madrid	Antequera
20:30	Scoring by quarter: 24–25, 24–36, 27–21, 16–16
	Pts: Đedović 22	Boxscore	Pts: Musa 30	Arena: Fernando Argüelles

13 September 2022 Trofeo Costa del Sol	Real Madrid (Spain)	89–81	(Lithuania) Žalgiris	Antequera
20:30	Scoring by quarter: 20–26, 23–17, 28–18, 18–20
	Pts: Tavares, Musa 19	Boxscore	Pts: Dimša 17	Arena: Fernando Argüelles

17 September 2022 Trofeo Luis Casimiro	Real Madrid	91–104	UCAM Murcia	Puertollano
19:30	Scoring by quarter: 24–24, 16–30, 27–21, 24–29
	Pts: Tavares 26	Boxscore	Pts: Anderson, Trice 17	Arena: Antonio Rivilla

== Competitions ==
=== Overview ===
Competition	First match	Last match	Starting round	Final position	Record							
Competition	First match	Last match	Starting round	Final position	Pld	W	D	L	PF	PA	PD	Win %
Liga ACB	28 September 2022	20 June 2023	Round 1	Runners-up	43	33		10	3,794	3,366	+428	76.74
EuroLeague	6 October 2022	21 May 2023	Round 1	Winners	41	28		13	3,466	3,246	+220	68.29
Copa del Rey	16 February 2023	18 February 2023	Quarter-finals	Semi-finals	2	1		1	168	178	−10	50.00
Supercopa de España	24 September 2022	25 September 2022	Semi-finals	Winners	2	2		0	189	152	+37	100.00
Total					88	64	0	24	7,617	6,942	+675	72.73

Last updated: 20 June 2023
Source: Competitions

=== Liga ACB ===
==== League table ====
Pos	Team	Pld	W	L	PF	PA	PD	Qualification or relegation
1	Barça	34	29	5	2895	2489	+406	Qualification to playoffs
2	Cazoo Baskonia	34	28	6	3128	2817	+311	Qualification to playoffs
3	Real Madrid	34	28	6	3005	2629	+376	Qualification to playoffs
4	Lenovo Tenerife	34	24	10	2834	2517	+317	Qualification to playoffs
5	Unicaja	34	24	10	2969	2638	+331	Qualification to playoffs

Source: ACB
Rules for classification: 1) Win–loss record; 2) Head–to–head record; 3) Head–to–head point difference; 4) Point difference; 5) Points scored; 6) Sum of quotients of points scored (Note: Head–to–head record is used only after all the matches between the teams in question have been played)

==== Results summary ====
Overall						Home					Away				
Pld	W	L	PF	PA	PD	W	L	PF	PA	PD	W	L	PF	PA	PD
34	28	6	3005	2629	+376	15	2	1562	1315	+247	13	4	1443	1314	+129

Last updated: 24 May 2023.
Source: Competitive matches

==== Results by round ====
Round	1	2	3	4	5	6	7	8	9	10	11	12	13	14	15	16	17	18	19	20	21	22	23	24	25	26	27	28	29	30	31	32	33	34
Ground	A	H	A	H	A	H	A	H	A	H	H	A	A	H	H	A	H	A	H	A	A	H	H	A	H	A	A	H	A	H	H	A	A	H
Result	W	W	W	W	L	W	L	W	W	W	W	W	W	L	W	W	W	W	W	W	W	W	L	W	W	L	L	W	W	W	W	W	W	W
Position	4	3	3	2	3	3	4	2	2	2	2	1	1	1	1	1	1	1	1	1	1	1	1	1	1	2	3	3	3	3	3	3	3	3

Source: Competitive matches
A = Away; H = Home; W = Win; L = Loss; R = Rest

==== Matches ====
28 September 2022 1	Bàsquet Girona	88–94	Real Madrid	Girona
21:00	Scoring by quarter: 20–17, 16–28, 21–24, 31–25
	Pts: Taylor 22; Rebs: Vila, Gasol 7 Asts: Gasol 7 PIR: Gasol 34	Boxscore	Pts: Hezonja 23; Rebs: Hezonja 7 Asts: Llull 7 PIR: Hezonja 26	Arena: Fontajau; Attendance: 5,000; Referees: Benjamín Jiménez, Rafael Serrano, Andrés Fernández

2 October 2022 2	Real Madrid	93–79	Monbus Obradoiro	Madrid
12:30	Scoring by quarter: 27–12, 15–13, 26–30, 25–24
	Pts: Musa 22; Rebs: Tavares, Hezonja 6 Asts: Rodríguez 5 PIR: Musa 24	Boxscore	Pts: Bender 19; Rebs: T. Scrubb 8 Asts: Westermann 4 PIR: Bender 25	Arena: WiZink Center; Attendance: 6,476; Referees: Óscar Perea, Rubén Sánchez Mohedas, Vicente Martínez

9 October 2022 3	Unicaja	71–76	Real Madrid	Málaga
12:30	Scoring by quarter: 14–18, 17–19, 16–19, 24–20
	Pts: Brizuela 17; Rebs: Lima, Osetkowski 6 Asts: Díaz 8 PIR: Brizuela 17	Boxscore	Pts: Musa 15; Rebs: Tavares, Poirier 7 Asts: Rodríguez 6 PIR: Yabusele 20	Arena: Martín Carpena; Attendance: 10,602; Referees: Carlos Cortés, Luis Miguel Castillo, Alberto Baena

16 October 2022 4	Real Madrid	96–79	Joventut	Madrid
19:30	Scoring by quarter: 23–25, 22–25, 24–15, 27–14
	Pts: Musa 18; Rebs: Hezonja 9 Asts: Llull 6 PIR: Musa 24	Boxscore	Pts: Guy 15; Rebs: Parra 8 Asts: Feliz 6 PIR: Feliz, Tomić 16	Arena: WiZink Center; Attendance: 6,546; Referees: Daniel Hierrezuelo, Jorge Martínez, Cristóbal Sánchez

23 October 2022 5	Cazoo Baskonia	88–82	Real Madrid	Vitoria-Gasteiz
20:00	Scoring by quarter: 14–19, 23–14, 18–25, 33–24
	Pts: Hommes 24; Rebs: Sedekerskis 8 Asts: Thompson 7 PIR: Hommes 20	Boxscore	Pts: Deck, Musa 17; Rebs: Deck 8 Asts: Musa 5 PIR: three players 20	Arena: Buesa Arena; Attendance: 9,611; Referees: Jordi Aliaga, Sergio Manuel, Alberto Sánchez Sixto

30 October 2022 6	Real Madrid	91–69	Carplus Fuenlabrada	Madrid
12:30	Scoring by quarter: 26–12, 26–18, 13–22, 26–17
	Pts: Llull 16; Rebs: Deck 9 Asts: Rodríguez 7 PIR: Deck 22	Boxscore	Pts: Bagayoko 11; Rebs: Bagayoko 8 Asts: Novak 7 PIR: Novak 17	Arena: WiZink Center; Attendance: 6,807; Referees: Juan Carlos García González, Arnau Padrós, Raúl Zamorano

6 November 2022 7	Casademont Zaragoza	94–89	Real Madrid	Zaragoza
18:30	Scoring by quarter: 20–13, 28–23, 23–22, 23–31
	Pts: Jessup 28; Rebs: Radončić, Jessup 6 Asts: Sant-Roos 6 PIR: Jessup 31	Boxscore	Pts: Hezonja, Llull 17; Rebs: Deck 8 Asts: Musa 4 PIR: Musa 19	Arena: Pabellón Príncipe Felipe; Attendance: 6,719; Referees: Miguel Ángel Pérez, Vicente Bultó, Carlos Merino

20 November 2022 8	Real Madrid	93–57	UCAM Murcia	Madrid
12:30	Scoring by quarter: 27–9, 25–13, 19–21, 22–14
	Pts: Poirier 19; Rebs: Tavares 6 Asts: Llull 5 PIR: Poirier 23	Boxscore	Pts: Diop 11; Rebs: three players 5 Asts: three players 2 PIR: Diop 10	Arena: WiZink Center; Attendance: 6,515; Referees: Carlos Peruga, Esperanza Mendoza, Roberto Lucas

27 November 2022 9	Real Betis	55–73	Real Madrid	Seville
12:30	Scoring by quarter: 16–23, 10–16, 11–14, 18–20
	Pts: Evans, Cvetković 9 Rebs: Sylla 8 Asts: Bertāns 3 PIR: Hill, Cvetković 10	Boxscore	Pts: Deck, Rodríguez 10; Rebs: Tavares 10; Asts: Tavares 6 PIR: Tavares 22	Arena: San Pablo; Attendance: 4,364; Referees: Fernando Calatrava, Rubén Sánchez Mohedas, Vicente Martínez

4 December 2022 10	Real Madrid	79–62	Valencia Basket	Madrid
18:00	Scoring by quarter: 19–7, 13–20, 26–16, 21–19
	Pts: Musa 22; Rebs: Deck 8 Asts: Deck 5 PIR: Musa 22	Boxscore	Pts: Webb 14; Rebs: Claver, Dubljević 5 Asts: four players 2 PIR: Webb 15	Arena: WiZink Center; Attendance: 8,133; Referees: Daniel Hierrezuelo, Luis Miguel Castillo, Cristóbal Sánchez

11 December 2022 11	Real Madrid	103–89	Baxi Manresa	Madrid
12:30	Scoring by quarter: 23–16, 23–19, 34–26, 23–28
	Pts: Causeur 20; Rebs: Poirier 7 Asts: Williams-Goss, Rodríguez 5 PIR: Musa, Poirier 26	Boxscore	Pts: Vaulet 27; Rebs: Vaulet, Tass 10; Asts: Pérez, Ferrari 7 PIR: Vaulet 32	Arena: WiZink Center; Attendance: 5,517; Referees: Jordi Aliaga, Sergio Manuel, Héctor Baez

18 December 2022 12	Lenovo Tenerife	67–80	Real Madrid	San Cristóbal de La Laguna
13:00	Scoring by quarter: 15–16, 16–22, 14–12, 22–30
	Pts: Abromaitis 15; Rebs: Abromaitis 5 Asts: Fitipaldo 7 PIR: Fitipaldo 20	Boxscore	Pts: Hezonja 15; Rebs: Abalde 7 Asts: Rodríguez 4 PIR: Tavares 17	Arena: Santiago Martín; Attendance: 5,219; Referees: Benjamín Jiménez, Rafael Serrano, David Sánchez

27 December 2022 13	Surne Bilbao Basket	80–85	Real Madrid	Bilbao
21:00	Scoring by quarter: 16–21, 26–21, 16–17, 22–26
	Pts: Håkanson 29; Rebs: Withey 6 Asts: Håkanson 4 PIR: Håkanson 33	Boxscore	Pts: Tavares 15; Rebs: Tavares 12; Asts: Llull 3 PIR: Tavares 23	Arena: Bilbao Arena; Attendance: 9,972; Referees: Emilio Pérez Pizarro, Arnau Padrós, Andrés Fernández

2 January 2023 14	Real Madrid	78–87	Barça	Madrid
21:00	Scoring by quarter: 26–28, 18–14, 13–20, 21–25
	Pts: Tavares 19; Rebs: Tavares 11; Asts: Williams-Goss 5 PIR: Tavares 30	Boxscore	Pts: Laprovíttola 19; Rebs: da Silva 9 Asts: Laprovíttola 6 PIR: Kalinić 19	Arena: WiZink Center; Attendance: 11,187; Referees: Carlos Peruga, Carlos Cortés, Jorge Martínez

8 January 2023 15	Real Madrid	105–85	Gran Canaria	Madrid
12:30	Scoring by quarter: 25–23, 25–13, 26–24, 29–25
	Pts: Tavares 21; Rebs: Poirier 6 Asts: Rodríguez 9 PIR: Tavares 25	Boxscore	Pts: Diop 18; Rebs: Salvó 7 Asts: Bassas 5 PIR: Diop 18	Arena: WiZink Center; Attendance: 8,131; Referees: Miguel Ángel Pérez Pérez, Óscar Perea, Fabio Fernández

15 January 2023 16	Covirán Granada	62–82	Real Madrid	Granada
12:30	Scoring by quarter: 14–19, 10–13, 22–25, 16–25
	Pts: Renfroe 17; Rebs: Niang 13; Asts: Renfroe 3 PIR: Niang, Renfroe 16	Boxscore	Pts: Musa 20; Rebs: Tavares 10; Asts: Musa, Llull 4 PIR: Tavares 28	Arena: Palacio de Deportes; Attendance: 8,028; Referees: Daniel Hierrezuelo, Sergio Manuel, Rubén Sánchez Mohedas

22 January 2023 17	Real Madrid	91–73	Río Breogán	Madrid
20:00	Scoring by quarter: 24–11, 22–26, 28–9, 17–27
	Pts: Musa 21; Rebs: Tavares 7 Asts: Llull 5 PIR: Tavares 31	Boxscore	Pts: Nenadić 22; Rebs: Happ 19; Asts: Nenadić 5 PIR: Happ 37	Arena: WiZink Center; Attendance: 7,059; Referees: Jordi Aliaga, Luis Miguel Castillo, Vicente Martínez

29 January 2023 18	Baxi Manresa	69–94	Real Madrid	Manresa
12:30	Scoring by quarter: 22–32, 14–25, 13–19, 20–18
	Pts: Harding 21; Rebs: three players 5 Asts: Pérez 4 PIR: Harding 17	Boxscore	Pts: Musa, Hezonja 12; Rebs: Poirier 7 Asts: Rodríguez 5 PIR: Musa 22	Arena: Nou Congost; Attendance: 4,865; Referees: Juan Carlos García González, Alberto Sánchez Sixto, Raúl Zamorano

5 February 2023 19	Real Madrid	88–77	Lenovo Tenerife	Madrid
18:30	Scoring by quarter: 28–20, 22–16, 20–23, 18–18
	Pts: Musa, Poirier 15; Rebs: Hezonja 5 Asts: Williams-Goss, Rodríguez 4 PIR: Musa, Poirier 20	Boxscore	Pts: Cook, Doornekamp 16; Rebs: Guerra 8 Asts: Fitipaldo 9 PIR: Cook, Doornekamp 12	Arena: WiZink Center; Attendance: 8,059; Referees: Emilio Pérez Pizarro, Javier Torres, Joaquín García

12 February 2023 20	UCAM Murcia	80–88	Real Madrid	Murcia
18:30	Scoring by quarter: 20–20, 12–20, 23–31, 25–17
	Pts: Pustovyi 20; Rebs: Anderson 5 Asts: three players 4 PIR: Bellas 18	Boxscore	Pts: Tavares 18; Rebs: Tavares 11; Asts: Musa 3 PIR: Tavares, Hezonja 25	Arena: Palacio de Deportes; Attendance: 7,500; Referees: Fernando Calatrava, Vicente Bultó, Héctor Baez

5 March 2023 21	Monbus Obradoiro	78–84	Real Madrid	Santiago de Compostela
17:00	Scoring by quarter: 14–24, 16–20, 27–22, 21–18
	Pts: Blaževič 18; Rebs: Blaževič 9 Asts: P. Scrubb 8 PIR: Blaževič 22	Boxscore	Pts: Musa 19; Rebs: Yabusele 7 Asts: Rodríguez 6 PIR: Musa 21	Arena: Fontes do Sar; Attendance: 5,815; Referees: Benjamín Jiménez, Esperanza Mendoza, Roberto Lucas

12 March 2023 22	Real Madrid	86–65	Surne Bilbao Basket	Madrid
12:30	Scoring by quarter: 11–15, 27–13, 26–13, 22–24
	Pts: Causeur 16; Rebs: Cornelie 9 Asts: Hanga, Rodríguez 4 PIR: Abalde 20	Boxscore	Pts: Kyser, Reyes 10; Rebs: Sulejmanović, Rabaseda 5 Asts: Smith 4 PIR: Kyser 11	Arena: WiZink Center; Attendance: 7,373; Referees: Martín Caballero, Francisco Araña, David Sánchez

19 March 2023 23	Real Madrid	88–95	Cazoo Baskonia	Madrid
18:30	Scoring by quarter: 27–15, 18–24, 24–31, 19–25
	Pts: Deck 21; Rebs: Tavares 10; Asts: Yabusele, Musa 3 PIR: Deck 26	Boxscore	Pts: Howard 19; Rebs: Enoch 10; Asts: Thompson 8 PIR: Heidegger 19	Arena: WiZink Center; Attendance: 7,857; Referees: Antonio Conde, Carlos Cortés, Andrés Fernández

26 March 2023 24	Carplus Fuenlabrada	78–102	Real Madrid	Fuenlabrada
18:30	Scoring by quarter: 13–29, 18–21, 26–32, 21–20
	Pts: Pinder 21; Rebs: Pinder 10; Asts: Novak 10; PIR: Pinder 13	Boxscore	Pts: Causeur 22; Rebs: Cornelie 8 Asts: Hanga 5 PIR: Poirier 26	Arena: Fernando Martín; Attendance: 4,981; Referees: Daniel Hierrezuelo, Joaquín García, Fabio Fernández

2 April 2023 25	Real Madrid	108–75	Covirán Granada	Madrid
17:00	Scoring by quarter: 30–15, 29–22, 22–21, 27–17
	Pts: Poirier 21; Rebs: Randolph 8 Asts: Rodríguez 8 PIR: Hezonja 27	Boxscore	Pts: Ndoye 15; Rebs: Niang 5 Asts: Renfroe 7 PIR: Renfroe 20	Arena: WiZink Center; Attendance: 6,334; Referees: Miguel Ángel Pérez Pérez, Javier Torres, Roberto Lucas

8 April 2023 26	Río Breogán	96–72	Real Madrid	Lugo
19:00	Scoring by quarter: 21–12, 18–22, 31–17, 26–21
	Pts: Hollatz 21; Rebs: Nenadić 7 Asts: Hollatz 6 PIR: Hollatz 26	Boxscore	Pts: Musa 14; Rebs: Deck 8 Asts: Abalde 5 PIR: Deck 20	Arena: Pazo dos Deportes; Attendance: 5,185; Referees: Jordi Aliaga, Alberto Baena, Vicente Martínez

16 April 2023 27	Barça	97–82	Real Madrid	Barcelona
18:30	Scoring by quarter: 17–24, 30–22, 31–17, 19–19
	Pts: Mirotić 23; Rebs: Kalinić 7 Asts: Satoranský 9 PIR: Satoranský 25	Boxscore	Pts: Musa 24; Rebs: Musa, Tavares 5 Asts: Musa 3 PIR: Musa 33	Arena: Palau Blaugrana; Attendance: 7,580; Referees: Carlos Peruga, Óscar Perea, Martín Caballero

18 April 2023 28	Real Madrid	89–70	Bàsquet Girona	Madrid
21:00	Scoring by quarter: 19–11, 25–21, 27–19, 18–19
	Pts: Yabusele 15; Rebs: Randolph 8 Asts: Williams-Goss 5 PIR: Randolph 20	Boxscore	Pts: Gasol 14; Rebs: three players 4 Asts: Taylor 5 PIR: Gasol 14	Arena: WiZink Center; Attendance: 6,117; Referees: Fernando Calatrava, Juan de Dios Oyón, Héctor Baez

23 April 2023 29	Joventut	76–86	Real Madrid	Badalona
18:30	Scoring by quarter: 18–30, 20–15, 19–26, 19–15
	Pts: Feliz 13; Rebs: Parra 6 Asts: Feliz 5 PIR: Feliz 19	Boxscore	Pts: Hezonja 20; Rebs: Tavares, Randolph 8 Asts: Williams-Goss 4 PIR: Hezonja 20	Arena: Palau Municipal d'Esports; Attendance: 9,603; Referees: Juan Carlos García González, Joaquín García, Iyán González

30 April 2023 30	Real Madrid	93–86	Casademont Zaragoza	Madrid
12:30	Scoring by quarter: 18–13, 17–27, 31–26, 27–20
	Pts: Williams-Goss, Deck 19; Rebs: Deck 9 Asts: Llull 5 PIR: Deck 26	Boxscore	Pts: Simanić 20; Rebs: Simanić 8 Asts: Jović 7 PIR: Simanić 21	Arena: WiZink Center; Attendance: 6,148; Referees: Benjamín Jiménez, Vicente Bultó, Alberto Sánchez Sixto

7 May 2023 31	Real Madrid	102–90	Unicaja	Madrid
12:30	Scoring by quarter: 24–24, 25–22, 30–28, 23–16
	Pts: Yabusele 28; Rebs: Yabusele 11; Asts: Williams-Goss 5 PIR: Yabusele 33	Boxscore	Pts: Osetkowski 24; Rebs: Kravish 8 Asts: Kalinoski 5 PIR: Osetkowski 20	Arena: WiZink Center; Attendance: 6,189; Referees: Emilio Pérez Pizarro, Sergio Manuel, Rubén Sánchez Mohedas

12 May 2023 32	Valencia Basket	68–79	Real Madrid	Valencia
21:00	Scoring by quarter: 15–20, 20–19, 18–21, 15–19
	Pts: Webb 18; Rebs: Dubljević 6 Asts: Radebaugh 4 PIR: Webb 17	Boxscore	Pts: Yabusele 25; Rebs: Yabusele 7 Asts: Causeur 7 PIR: Yabusele 28	Arena: La Fonteta; Attendance: 7,585; Referees: Antonio Conde, Arnau Padrós, Cristóbal Sánchez

14 May 2023 33	Gran Canaria	67–95	Real Madrid	Las Palmas
13:30	Scoring by quarter: 21–23, 22–31, 16–17, 8–24
	Pts: Slaughter 16; Rebs: Diop 6 Asts: Albicy 3 PIR: Slaughter 18	Boxscore	Pts: Causeur 19; Rebs: Yabusele 9 Asts: Rodríguez 11; PIR: Yabusele 28	Arena: Gran Canaria Arena; Attendance: 8,194; Referees: Fernando Calatrava, Jorge Martínez, Fabio Fernández

24 May 2023 34	Real Madrid	79–77	Real Betis	Madrid
20:30	Scoring by quarter: 24–19, 14–19, 19–23, 22–16
	Pts: Yabusele 14; Rebs: Tavares 9 Asts: Williams-Goss 6 PIR: Tavares 23	Boxscore	Pts: Montero 19; Rebs: Pérez 13; Asts: Pargo 5 PIR: Pérez 27	Arena: WiZink Center; Attendance: 6,643; Referees: Juan Carlos García González, Carlos Cortés, Sergio Manuel

=== ACB Playoffs ===
Win Loss

==== Quarterfinals ====
28 May 2023 1	Real Madrid	95–68	Dreamland Gran Canaria	Madrid
12:30	Scoring by quarter: 22–13, 29–12, 19–22, 25–21
	Pts: Musa 20; Rebs: Tavares 8 Asts: three players 3 PIR: Musa 21	Boxscore	Pts: Inglis, Balcerowski 15; Rebs: Inglis, Balcerowski 5 Asts: Brussino 5 PIR: Inglis 18	Arena: WiZink Center; Attendance: 7,558; Referees: Fernando Calatrava, Jorge Martínez, Joaquín García

31 May 2023 2	Dreamland Gran Canaria	81–89	Real Madrid	Las Palmas
21:00	Scoring by quarter: 18–21, 19–18, 19–28, 25–22
	Pts: Slaughter 17; Rebs: Inglis 8 Asts: Albicy 4 PIR: Balcerowski 15	Boxscore	Pts: Musa 22; Rebs: Tavares 12; Asts: Rodríguez 4 PIR: Musa 24	Arena: Gran Canaria Arena; Attendance: 6,287; Referees: Carlos Peruga, Carlos Cortés, Juan de Dios Oyón

==== Semifinals ====
6 June 2023 1	Real Madrid	83–93	Joventut	Madrid
21:00	Scoring by quarter: 22–18, 17–24, 25–25, 19–26
	Pts: Musa, Tavares 18; Rebs: Tavares 14; Asts: Rodríguez 4 PIR: Tavares 38	Boxscore	Pts: Guy 30; Rebs: Tomić 11; Asts: Vives 6 PIR: Guy, Tomić 26	Arena: WiZink Center; Attendance: 8,672; Referees: Antonio Conde, Emilio Pérez Pizarro, Vicente Martínez

8 June 2023 2	Real Madrid	90–73	Joventut	Madrid
21:00	Scoring by quarter: 22–14, 14–26, 27–19, 27–14
	Pts: Yabusele 27; Rebs: Tavares 10; Asts: Williams-Goss, Rodríguez 4 PIR: Yabusele 37	Boxscore	Pts: Ellenson 17; Rebs: Parra 7 Asts: Feliz 4 PIR: Feliz 19	Arena: WiZink Center; Attendance: 9,468; Referees: Daniel Hierrezuelo, Benjamín Jiménez, Andrés Fernández

10 June 2023 3	Joventut	73–83	Real Madrid	Badalona
18:30	Scoring by quarter: 16–25, 16–23, 11–22, 30–13
	Pts: Guy 20; Rebs: Tomić 6 Asts: Feliz 5 PIR: Guy 19	Boxscore	Pts: Musa 25; Rebs: Tavares 8 Asts: Williams-Goss 5 PIR: Musa 29	Arena: Palau Municipal d'Esports; Attendance: 12,323; Referees: Carlos Peruga, Óscar Perea, Fabio Fernández

12 June 2023 4	Joventut	73–94	Real Madrid	Badalona
21:00	Scoring by quarter: 17–17, 18–21, 14–25, 24–31
	Pts: Parra 17; Rebs: Birgander 7 Asts: Feliz, Vives 4 PIR: Parra 20	Boxscore	Pts: Musa, Hezonja 16; Rebs: Tavares 10; Asts: Rodríguez 7 PIR: Tavares 28	Arena: Palau Municipal d'Esports; Attendance: 9,924; Referees: Emilio Pérez Pizarro, Fernando Calatrava, Alfonso Olivares

==== Finals ====
16 June 2023 1	Barça	97–88	Real Madrid	Barcelona
21:00	Scoring by quarter: 28–23, 19–27, 16–11, 34–27
	Pts: Laprovíttola 19; Rebs: Mirotić 7 Asts: Jokubaitis 7 PIR: Laprovíttola 23	Boxscore	Pts: Rodríguez 16; Rebs: Tavares 7 Asts: Rodríguez 3 PIR: Tavares 22	Arena: Palau Blaugrana; Attendance: 6,819; Referees: Daniel Hierrezuelo, Óscar Perea, Martín Caballero

18 June 2023 2	Barça	86–85	Real Madrid	Barcelona
21:00	Scoring by quarter: 20–19, 25–22, 23–24, 18–20
	Pts: Mirotić 20; Rebs: Satoranský 5 Asts: Laprovíttola 4 PIR: Mirotić 26	Boxscore	Pts: Hezonja 18; Rebs: Tavares 6 Asts: Musa 3 PIR: Hezonja 22	Arena: Palau Blaugrana; Attendance: 7,406; Referees: Antonio Conde, Emilio Pérez Pizarro, Fernando Calatrava

20 June 2023 3	Real Madrid	82–93	Barça	Madrid
21:00	Scoring by quarter: 21–20, 20–18, 25–29, 16–26
	Pts: Tavares 19; Rebs: Tavares 11; Asts: Rodríguez 6 PIR: Tavares 28	Boxscore	Pts: Veselý 19; Rebs: Mirotić 6 Asts: Laprovíttola 5 PIR: Mirotić 18	Arena: WiZink Center; Attendance: 11,965; Referees: Carlos Peruga, Benjamín Jiménez, Javier Torres

=== EuroLeague ===
==== League table ====
Pos	Team	Pld	W	L	PF	PA	PD	Qualification
1	(Hellenic Basketball Federation) Olympiacos	34	24	10	2857	2578	+279	Qualification to playoffs
2	(Spanish Basketball Federation) Barcelona	34	23	11	2723	2580	+143	Qualification to playoffs
3	(Spanish Basketball Federation) Real Madrid	34	23	11	2877	2666	+211	Qualification to playoffs
4	(French Federation of Basketball) AS Monaco	34	21	13	2802	2749	+53	Qualification to playoffs
5	(Israeli Basketball Association) Maccabi Playtika Tel Aviv	34	20	14	2827	2743	+84	Qualification to playoffs

Source: EuroLeague
Rules for classification: All points scored in extra period(s) were not counted in the standings, nor for any tie-break situation.

==== Results summary ====
Overall						Home					Away				
Pld	W	L	PF	PA	PD	W	L	PF	PA	PD	W	L	PF	PA	PD
34	23	11	2877	2666	+211	13	4	1505	1335	+170	10	7	1372	1331	+41

Last updated: 13 April 2023.
Source: Competitive matches

==== Results by round ====
Round	1	2	3	4	5	6	7	8	9	10	11	12	13	14	15	16	17	18	19	20	21	22	23	24	25	26	27	28	29	30	31	32	33	34
Ground	A	A	H	H	H	A	H	H	A	H	A	H	A	A	H	A	H	A	A	A	H	H	A	A	H	A	H	H	H	A	H	A	H	A
Result	W	L	L	W	L	W	W	W	W	W	W	L	W	L	W	L	W	W	W	L	W	W	W	L	W	W	L	W	W	W	W	L	W	L
Position	8	8	10	9	10	9	5	4	3	3	2	4	3	5	2	6	2	1	1	2	2	2	2	2	2	1	2	2	2	2	2	3	2	3

Updated to match(es) played on 13 April 2023. Source: Competitive matches
A = Away; H = Home; W = Win; L = Loss; P = Postponed

==== Matches ====
6 October 2022 1	Panathinaikos (Greece)	68–71	(Spain) Real Madrid	Marousi
20:00	Scoring by quarter: 22–23, 15–15, 14–16, 17–17
	Pts: Williams 15; Rebs: Bochoridis, Ponitka 6 Asts: Ponitka 4 PIR: Williams 17	Boxscore	Pts: Tavares 14; Rebs: Deck 13; Asts: Llull 5 PIR: Tavares 22	Arena: OAKA Altion; Attendance: 8,387; Referees: Matej Boltauzer, Carmelo Paternicò, Emin Moğulkoç

13 October 2022 2	Barcelona (Spain)	75–73	(Spain) Real Madrid	Barcelona
20:30	Scoring by quarter: 24–15, 16–15, 23–22, 12–21
	Pts: Şanlı 14; Rebs: Satoranský 7 Asts: Laprovíttola 6 PIR: Satoranský 22	Boxscore	Pts: Deck 21; Rebs: Yabusele 7 Asts: Llull, Rodríguez 4 PIR: Deck 23	Arena: Palau Blaugrana; Attendance: 7,511; Referees: Borys Ryzhyk, Oļegs Latiševs, Milan Nedović

19 October 2022 3	Real Madrid (Spain)	87–89	(Greece) Olympiacos	Madrid
20:45	Scoring by quarter: 21–20, 17–17, 24–26, 25–26
	Pts: Musa 17; Rebs: Deck 7 Asts: Rodríguez 8 PIR: Tavares 17	Boxscore	Pts: Vezenkov 23; Rebs: Vezenkov 12; Asts: Sloukas 7 PIR: Vezenkov 29	Arena: WiZink Center; Attendance: 7,492; Referees: Gytis Vilius, Sašo Petek, Amit Balak

21 October 2022 4	Real Madrid (Spain)	72–56	(Serbia) Crvena zvezda mts	Madrid
20:45	Scoring by quarter: 25–10, 14–20, 15–14, 18–12
	Pts: Musa 13; Rebs: Deck 9 Asts: Rodríguez 8 PIR: Deck 23	Boxscore	Pts: Bentil 17; Rebs: Bentil, Petrušev 5 Asts: Vildoza 4 PIR: Bentil 19	Arena: WiZink Center; Attendance: 7,561; Referees: Saša Pukl, Anne Panther, Robert Vyklický

27 October 2022 5	Real Madrid (Spain)	91–95	(Italy) Virtus Segafredo Bologna	Madrid
20:45	Scoring by quarter: 24–18, 21–23, 19–27, 27–27
	Pts: Deck 28; Rebs: Tavares 10; Asts: Musa 4 PIR: Deck 33	Boxscore	Pts: Lundberg 18; Rebs: Ojeleye 5 Asts: Hackett, Teodosić 4 PIR: Bako 22	Arena: WiZink Center; Attendance: 7,099; Referees: Matej Boltauzer, Saulius Račys, Marcin Kowalski

3 November 2022 6	EA7 Emporio Armani Milan (Italy)	77–83	(Spain) Real Madrid	Assago
20:30	Scoring by quarter: 20–23, 30–24, 11–20, 16–16
	Pts: Pangos 21; Rebs: Hines, Melli 3 Asts: Hall 7 PIR: Pangos 23	Boxscore	Pts: Musa 25; Rebs: Tavares 9 Asts: Musa 5 PIR: Musa 31	Arena: Mediolanum Forum; Attendance: 11,942; Referees: Sreten Radović, Oļegs Latiševs, Tomasz Trawicki

10 November 2022 7	Real Madrid (Spain)	94–85	(Turkey) Anadolu Efes	Madrid
19:45	Scoring by quarter: 26–19, 28–24, 15–20, 25–22
	Pts: Deck, Poirier 13; Rebs: Deck, Poirier 5 Asts: Hanga 6 PIR: Hanga 19	Boxscore	Pts: Clyburn 25; Rebs: Clyburn 9 Asts: Micić 8 PIR: Žižić 23	Arena: WiZink Center; Attendance: 7,345; Referees: Milivoje Jovčić, Gytis Vilius, Milan Nedović

17 November 2022 8	Real Madrid (Spain)	90–72	(Germany) ALBA Berlin	Madrid
20:45	Scoring by quarter: 26–20, 27–17, 17–15, 20–20
	Pts: Poirier 19; Rebs: Poirier 7 Asts: Rodríguez 10; PIR: Poirier 28	Boxscore	Pts: Procida 13; Rebs: Schneider 7 Asts: Delow, Blatt 3 PIR: three players 11	Arena: WiZink Center; Attendance: 6,512; Referees: Borys Ryzhyk, Elias Koromilas, Aare Halliko

22 November 2022 9	Valencia Basket (Spain)	73–80	(Spain) Real Madrid	Valencia
20:30	Scoring by quarter: 19–31, 12–10, 15–18, 27–21
	Pts: Van Rossom 17; Rebs: Alexander, Claver 5 Asts: Harper 5 PIR: Claver 19	Boxscore	Pts: Musa 28; Rebs: Deck 10; Asts: Tavares 6 PIR: Musa 32	Arena: La Fonteta; Attendance: 7,506; Referees: Robert Lottermoser, Ioannis Foufis, Michele Rossi

24 November 2022 10	Real Madrid (Spain)	105–97	(Serbia) Partizan Mozzart Bet	Madrid
20:45	Scoring by quarter: 32–40, 22–11, 32–23, 19–23
	Pts: Llull 20; Rebs: Tavares 8 Asts: Musa, Deck 4 PIR: Tavares, Deck 21	Boxscore	Pts: LeDay 20; Rebs: LeDay 6 Asts: LeDay 6 PIR: LeDay 28	Arena: WiZink Center; Attendance: 6,687; Referees: Fernando Rocha, Carmelo Paternicò, Amit Balak

2 December 2022 11	Fenerbahçe Beko (Turkey)	71–85	(Spain) Real Madrid	Istanbul
18:45	Scoring by quarter: 16–25, 18–21, 20–22, 17–17
	Pts: Motley 20; Rebs: Motley 7 Asts: Calathes 6 PIR: Booker 17	Boxscore	Pts: Musa 18; Rebs: Deck 8 Asts: Musa 6 PIR: Tavares 26	Arena: Ülker Sports and Event Hall; Attendance: 12,231; Referees: Saša Pukl, Ilija Belošević, Luka Kardum

8 December 2022 12	Real Madrid (Spain)	94–95(OT)	(France) AS Monaco	Madrid
21:00	Scoring by quarter: 23–17, 25–28, 14–20, 26–23, Overtime: 6–7
	Pts: Musa 24; Rebs: Tavares 18; Asts: Williams-Goss 5 PIR: Tavares 28	Boxscore	Pts: James 28; Rebs: Diallo 8 Asts: Loyd 4 PIR: James 27	Arena: WiZink Center; Attendance: 8,073; Referees: Damir Javor, Tomislav Hordov, Gentian Cici

13 December 2022 13	Bayern Munich (Germany)	64–68	(Spain) Real Madrid	Munich
20:30	Scoring by quarter: 22–21, 17–21, 11–12, 14–14
	Pts: Hunter 14; Rebs: Weiler-Babb, Bonga 6 Asts: Hunter 3 PIR: Bonga 16	Boxscore	Pts: Tavares 14; Rebs: Tavares 8 Asts: Abalde 4 PIR: Tavares 17	Arena: Audi Dome; Attendance: 6,500; Referees: Matej Boltauzer, Mehdi Difallah, Seffi Shemmesh

15 December 2022 14	Žalgiris (Lithuania)	81–72	(Spain) Real Madrid	Kaunas
19:00	Scoring by quarter: 18–21, 19–14, 19–20, 25–17
	Pts: Evans 20; Rebs: Birutis, Butkevičius 7 Asts: four players 2 PIR: Evans 25	Boxscore	Pts: Musa 22; Rebs: Tavares 7 Asts: Llull 5 PIR: Musa 16	Arena: Žalgirio Arena; Attendance: 14,646; Referees: Robert Lottermoser, Piotr Pastusiak, Uroš Obrknežević

22 December 2022 15	Real Madrid (Spain)	92–73	(France) LDLC ASVEL	Madrid
21:00	Scoring by quarter: 25–22, 20–12, 25–25, 22–14
	Pts: Poirier 19; Rebs: Poirier 6 Asts: Rodríguez 4 PIR: Poirier 25	Boxscore	Pts: Noua 17; Rebs: Noua 7 Asts: Obasohan 3 PIR: Noua 20	Arena: WiZink Center; Attendance: 7,466; Referees: Ilija Belošević, Emin Moğulkoç, Guido Giovannetti

29 December 2022 16	Cazoo Baskonia (Spain)	92–86	(Spain) Real Madrid	Vitoria-Gasteiz
19:00	Scoring by quarter: 24–28, 35–15, 14–26, 19–17
	Pts: Howard 28; Rebs: Thompson 6 Asts: Henry 5 PIR: Giedraitis 26	Boxscore	Pts: Deck 17; Rebs: Tavares 12; Asts: Williams-Goss 5 PIR: Tavares 27	Arena: Buesa Arena; Attendance: 15,504; Referees: Sreten Radović, Ioannis Foufis, Rain Peerandi

6 January 2023 17	Real Madrid (Spain)	98–65	(Israel) Maccabi Playtika Tel Aviv	Madrid
20:45	Scoring by quarter: 22–7, 29–27, 27–15, 20–16
	Pts: Musa, Cornelie 18; Rebs: Yabusele 8 Asts: Rodríguez 6 PIR: Cornelie 24	Boxscore	Pts: Adams 15; Rebs: Nebo 7 Asts: Brown 6 PIR: three players 12	Arena: WiZink Center; Attendance: 9,123; Referees: Borys Ryzhyk, Tomislav Hordov, Hugues Thépénier

10 January 2023 18	Crvena zvezda Meridianbet (Serbia)	59–79	(Spain) Real Madrid	Belgrade
19:00	Scoring by quarter: 16–25, 18–13, 17–19, 8–22
	Pts: Nedović 18; Rebs: Marković 6 Asts: Marković 7 PIR: Dobrić 16	Boxscore	Pts: Musa 19; Rebs: Tavares 12; Asts: Rodríguez 7 PIR: Tavares 35	Arena: Aleksandar Nikolić Hall; Attendance: 7,289; Referees: Oļegs Latiševs, Carmelo Paternicò, Tomasz Trawicki

12 January 2023 19	ALBA Berlin (Germany)	77–84	(Spain) Real Madrid	Berlin
20:00	Scoring by quarter: 12–25, 23–21, 24–20, 18–18
	Pts: Smith 22; Rebs: Koumadje, Sikma 6 Asts: Lô 6 PIR: Smith 21	Boxscore	Pts: Musa 15; Rebs: Tavares 11; Asts: Rodríguez 4 PIR: Tavares 20	Arena: Mercedes-Benz Arena; Attendance: 9,957; Referees: Mehdi Difallah, Jakub Zamojski, Amit Balak

20 January 2023 20	Olympiacos (Greece)	73–60	(Spain) Real Madrid	Piraeus
20:00	Scoring by quarter: 19–15, 17–13, 18–16, 19–16
	Pts: Walkup 18; Rebs: Black 9 Asts: Sloukas 6 PIR: Vezenkov 14	Boxscore	Pts: Musa, Tavares 12; Rebs: Poirier 8 Asts: Hezonja, Causeur 3 PIR: Poirier 12	Arena: Peace and Friendship Stadium; Attendance: 11,427; Referees: Ilija Belošević, Emin Moğulkoç, Robert Vyklický

26 January 2023 21	Real Madrid (Spain)	91–86(OT)	(Spain) Barcelona	Madrid
19:00	Scoring by quarter: 16–20, 16–19, 18–20, 23–14, Overtime: 18–13
	Pts: Deck 23; Rebs: Tavares, Deck 7 Asts: Rodríguez 4 PIR: Deck 33	Boxscore	Pts: Mirotić 17; Rebs: Kalinić 7 Asts: Satoranský 7 PIR: Satoranský 17	Arena: WiZink Center; Attendance: 10,305; Referees: Sreten Radović, Joseph Bissang, Tomislav Hordov

1 February 2023 22	Real Madrid (Spain)	83–68	(Greece) Panathinaikos	Madrid
20:45	Scoring by quarter: 26–14, 22–16, 20–27, 15–11
	Pts: Yabusele 16; Rebs: Tavares 9 Asts: three players 3 PIR: Yabusele 21	Boxscore	Pts: Lee 17; Rebs: Gudaitis 7 Asts: Lee, Bacon 3 PIR: Grigonis 14	Arena: WiZink Center; Attendance: 6,876; Referees: Milivoje Jovčić, Piotr Pastusiak, Josip Radojković

3 February 2023 23	AS Monaco (France)	91–95	(Spain) Real Madrid	Fontvieille
20:00	Scoring by quarter: 20–24, 26–26, 25–20, 20–25
	Pts: James 23; Rebs: Hall 6 Asts: James 7 PIR: James 24	Boxscore	Pts: Hezonja 30; Rebs: Deck 9 Asts: Hezonja 6 PIR: Hezonja 34	Arena: Salle Gaston Médecin; Attendance: 4,899; Referees: Saša Pukl, Oļegs Latiševs, Gytis Vilius

23 February 2023 25	Real Madrid (Spain)	96–69	(Lithuania) Žalgiris	Madrid
20:45	Scoring by quarter: 22–24, 31–14, 23–14, 20–17
	Pts: Musa 17; Rebs: Poirier 8 Asts: Rodríguez 6 PIR: Musa 20	Boxscore	Pts: Brazdeikis 16; Rebs: Polonara 6 Asts: four players 2 PIR: Brazdeikis 14	Arena: WiZink Center; Attendance: 7,783; Referees: Robert Lottermoser, Joseph Bissang, Eduard Udyanskyy

3 March 2023 26	LDLC ASVEL (France)	71–75	(Spain) Real Madrid	Villeurbanne
20:00	Scoring by quarter: 10–20, 22–27, 22–16, 17–12
	Pts: de Colo, Mathews 13; Rebs: Fall 9 Asts: three players 3 PIR: Tyus 12	Boxscore	Pts: Causeur 14; Rebs: Tavares 7 Asts: Rodríguez, Deck 3 PIR: Causeur 23	Arena: Astroballe; Attendance: 5,436; Referees: Borys Ryzhyk, Piotr Pastusiak, Mario Majkić

7 March 2023 27	Real Madrid (Spain)	81–85	(Spain) Cazoo Baskonia	Madrid
20:45	Scoring by quarter: 22–17, 21–23, 22–22, 16–23
	Pts: Musa 21; Rebs: Musa 8 Asts: Rodríguez 8 PIR: Musa 26	Boxscore	Pts: Costello 20; Rebs: Kotsar 6 Asts: Thompson 14; PIR: Thompson 32	Arena: WiZink Center; Attendance: 7,286; Referees: Damir Javor, Emin Moğulkoç, Gytis Vilius

9 March 2023 28	Real Madrid (Spain)	95–91	(Spain) Valencia Basket	Madrid
20:45	Scoring by quarter: 24–20, 25–20, 22–25, 24–26
	Pts: Deck 18; Rebs: Cornelie, Deck 7 Asts: Rodríguez 7 PIR: Deck 26	Boxscore	Pts: Jones 19; Rebs: Radebaugh 4 Asts: Prepelič 6 PIR: Jones 26	Arena: WiZink Center; Attendance: 6,381; Referees: Mehdi Difallah, Amit Balak, Guido Giovannetti

14 March 2023 24	Anadolu Efes (Turkey)	90–89	(Spain) Real Madrid	Istanbul
18:30	Scoring by quarter: 18–24, 24–15, 35–21, 13–29
	Pts: Larkin 18; Rebs: Clyburn 7 Asts: Larkin 8 PIR: Bryant 23	Boxscore	Pts: Musa 16; Rebs: Poirier 7 Asts: Musa 5 PIR: Tavares 21	Arena: Sinan Erdem Dome; Attendance: 15,077; Referees: Ilija Belošević, Carmelo Paternicò, Mario Majkić
Note: Originally scheduled to be played on 9 February 2023, the game was postponed due to the 2023 Turkey–Syria earthquakes.

16 March 2023 29	Real Madrid (Spain)	91–87	(Italy) EA7 Emporio Armani Milan	Madrid
20:45	Scoring by quarter: 24–23, 18–17, 25–26, 24–21
	Pts: Musa 27; Rebs: Tavares 8 Asts: Rodríguez 7 PIR: Musa 38	Boxscore	Pts: Napier 17; Rebs: Melli 7 Asts: Napier 8 PIR: Napier 24	Arena: WiZink Center; Attendance: 7,114; Referees: Saša Pukl, Fernando Rocha, Luka Kardum

24 March 2023 30	Virtus Segafredo Bologna (Italy)	79–96	(Spain) Real Madrid	Bologna
20:30	Scoring by quarter: 12–26, 21–24, 25–18, 21–28
	Pts: Belinelli 26; Rebs: Shengelia, Mickey 6 Asts: Mannion 5 PIR: Belinelli 28	Boxscore	Pts: Hezonja 26; Rebs: Tavares 8 Asts: Rodríguez 5 PIR: Yabusele 30	Arena: Segafredo Arena; Attendance: 8,273; Referees: Tomislav Hordov, Uroš Nikolić, Seffi Shemmesh

29 March 2023 31	Real Madrid (Spain)	90–75	(Turkey) Fenerbahçe Beko	Madrid
20:45	Scoring by quarter: 24–21, 25–23, 19–14, 22–17
	Pts: Musa 16; Rebs: Deck 8 Asts: Hanga 7 PIR: Musa 25	Boxscore	Pts: Hayes 17; Rebs: Calathes, Jekiri 6 Asts: Calathes 6 PIR: Hayes 21	Arena: WiZink Center; Attendance: 9,523; Referees: Sreten Radović, Gytis Vilius, Milan Nedović

31 March 2023 32	Partizan Mozzart Bet (Serbia)	104–90	(Spanish Basketball Federation) Real Madrid	Belgrade
20:30	Scoring by quarter: 21–23, 28–15, 29–34, 26–18
	Pts: Punter, Lessort 16; Rebs: Lessort 8 Asts: Punter 6 PIR: Lessort 29	Boxscore	Pts: Musa 22; Rebs: Deck 7 Asts: Rodríguez 5 PIR: Musa, Deck 23	Arena: Štark Arena; Attendance: 20,068; Referees: Carmelo Paternicò, Piotr Pastusiak, Saulius Račys

6 April 2023 33	Real Madrid (Spain)	79–67	(German Basketball Federation) Bayern Munich	Madrid
20:45	Scoring by quarter: 19–13, 21–23, 16–8, 23–23
	Pts: Hezonja 20; Rebs: Musa, Tavares 5 Asts: Rodríguez 5 PIR: Yabusele 18	Boxscore	Pts: Obst 21; Rebs: Cheatham 8 Asts: Weiler-Babb 3 PIR: Cheatham 22	Arena: WiZink Center; Attendance: 7,239; Referees: Borys Ryzhyk, Fernando Rocha, Adar Peer

13 April 2023 34	Maccabi Playtika Tel Aviv (Israel)	100–96(OT)	(Spanish Basketball Federation) Real Madrid	Tel Aviv
20:05	Scoring by quarter: 16–18, 21–24, 28–20, 21–24, Overtime: 14–10
	Pts: Brown 22; Rebs: Nebo 11; Asts: Baldwin 8 PIR: Brown 27	Boxscore	Pts: Yabusele 25; Rebs: Yabusele 8 Asts: Rodríguez, Hanga 5 PIR: Yabusele 29	Arena: Menora Mivtachim Arena; Attendance: 10,649; Referees: Damir Javor, Anne Panther, Hugues Thépénier

=== EuroLeague Playoffs ===
Win Loss

25 April 2023 1	Real Madrid (Spain)	87–89	(Basketball Federation of Serbia) Partizan Mozzart Bet	Madrid
20:45	Scoring by quarter: 22–22, 22–26, 20–15, 23–26
	Pts: Deck 24; Rebs: Deck 8 Asts: Musa 3 PIR: Deck 33	Boxscore	Pts: Punter 26; Rebs: LeDay 4 Asts: Punter 6 PIR: Punter 33	Arena: WiZink Center; Attendance: 9,813; Referees: Robert Lottermoser, Gytis Vilius, Emin Moğulkoç

27 April 2023 2	Real Madrid (Spain)	80–95	(Basketball Federation of Serbia) Partizan Mozzart Bet	Madrid
20:45	Scoring by quarter: 21–31, 16–20, 25–24, 18–20
	Pts: Fernández, Hezonja 16; Rebs: Deck, Poirier 7 Asts: Rodríguez 5 PIR: Musa 16	Boxscore	Pts: Exum 19; Rebs: Lessort 9 Asts: three players 3 PIR: Lessort 21	Arena: WiZink Center; Attendance: 10,267; Referees: Sreten Radović, Oļegs Latiševs, Fernando Rocha

2 May 2023 3	Partizan Mozzart Bet (Serbia)	80–82	(Spain) Real Madrid	Belgrade
20:30	Scoring by quarter: 32–19, 16–26, 15–21, 17–16
	Pts: Smailagić, LeDay 15; Rebs: LeDay 8 Asts: Nunnally, Madar 3 PIR: LeDay 21	Boxscore	Pts: Tavares 26; Rebs: Hezonja 14; Asts: Musa, Rodríguez 4 PIR: Tavares 41	Arena: Štark Arena; Attendance: 20,091; Referees: Borys Ryzhyk, Mehdi Difallah, Emin Moğulkoç

4 May 2023 4	Partizan Mozzart Bet (Serbia)	78–85	(Spain) Real Madrid	Belgrade
20:30	Scoring by quarter: 15–27, 27–18, 13–16, 23–24
	Pts: LeDay 25; Rebs: Lessort 7 Asts: Anđušić, Exum 3 PIR: LeDay 25	Boxscore	Pts: Tavares, Hanga 15; Rebs: Musa 8 Asts: Rodríguez 7 PIR: Tavares 30	Arena: Štark Arena; Attendance: 19,440; Referees: Gytis Vilius, Robert Lottermoser, Carmelo Paternicò

10 May 2023 5	Real Madrid (Spain)	98–94	(Serbia) Partizan Mozzart Bet	Madrid
21:00	Scoring by quarter: 22–23, 17–32, 30–21, 29–18
	Pts: Musa 20; Rebs: Tavares 7 Asts: Rodríguez 6 PIR: Rodríguez 26	Boxscore	Pts: Punter 28; Rebs: Madar 4 Asts: Nunnally 5 PIR: Punter 26	Arena: WiZink Center; Attendance: 12,867; Referees: Borys Ryzhyk, Oļegs Latiševs, Mehdi Difallah

=== EuroLeague Final Four ===
19 May 2023 Semifinal	Barcelona (Spain)	66–78	(Spain) Real Madrid	Kaunas
20:00	Scoring by quarter: 18–18, 24–18, 13–22, 11–20
	Pts: Abrines 16; Rebs: Satoranský 11; Asts: three players 3 PIR: Abrines 14	Boxscore	Pts: Tavares 20; Rebs: Tavares 15; Asts: Rodríguez, Llull 5 PIR: Tavares 39	Arena: Žalgirio Arena; Attendance: 11,411; Referees: Saša Pukl, Emin Moğulkoç, Mehdi Difallah

21 May 2023 Final	Olympiacos (Greece)	78–79	(Spain) Real Madrid	Kaunas
19:00	Scoring by quarter: 24–17, 21–28, 18–14, 15–20
	Pts: Vezenkov 29; Rebs: Vezenkov 9 Asts: Walkup 6 PIR: Vezenkov 34	Boxscore	Pts: Rodríguez 15; Rebs: Tavares 10; Asts: Rodríguez 9 PIR: Rodríguez 23	Arena: Žalgirio Arena; Attendance: 11,066; Referees: Saša Pukl, Gytis Vilius, Mehdi Difallah

=== Copa del Rey ===
Win Loss

16 February 2023 Quarterfinal	Real Madrid	86–85	Valencia Basket	Badalona
18:30	Scoring by quarter: 21–13, 20–21, 22–24, 23–27
	Pts: Deck 19; Rebs: Deck 9 Asts: Hanga 4 PIR: Deck 26	Boxscore	Pts: Jones 20; Rebs: Claver, Dubljević 5 Asts: Jones 5 PIR: Jones 17	Arena: Palau Municipal d'Esports; Attendance: 9,218; Referees: Emilio Pérez Pizarro, Óscar Perea, Joaquín García

18 February 2023 Semifinal	Real Madrid	82–93	Unicaja	Badalona
18:30	Scoring by quarter: 19–17, 20–22, 20–27, 23–27
	Pts: Tavares 19; Rebs: Deck 6 Asts: Rodríguez 3 PIR: Tavares 26	Boxscore	Pts: Kravish 20; Rebs: Kravish, Kalinoski 6 Asts: Carter 5 PIR: Kravish 24	Arena: Palau Municipal d'Esports; Attendance: 11,547; Referees: Antonio Conde, Óscar Perea, Rafael Serrano

=== Supercopa de España ===
24 September 2022 Semifinal	Coosur Real Betis	69–100	Real Madrid	Seville
18:30	Scoring by quarter: 21–25, 14–17, 13–26, 21–32
	Pts: Johnson 14; Rebs: Gerun, Johnson 6 Asts: five players 2 PIR: Johnson 16	Boxscore	Pts: Musa 21; Rebs: Yabusele 9 Asts: Musa 7 PIR: Musa 33	Arena: San Pablo; Attendance: 5,695; Referees: Carlos Peruga, Fernando Calatrava, Alberto Sánchez Sixto

25 September 2022 Final	Real Madrid	89–83(OT)	Barça	Seville
18:30	Scoring by quarter: 17–15, 12–22, 26–12, 16–22, Overtime: 18–12
	Pts: Tavares 24; Rebs: Tavares 12; Asts: three players 3 PIR: Tavares 40	Boxscore	Pts: Şanlı 21; Rebs: Kalinić 7 Asts: Laprovíttola 14; PIR: Laprovíttola 18	Arena: San Pablo; Attendance: 5,855; Referees: Daniel Hierrezuelo, Antonio Conde, Jordi Aliaga

== Statistics ==
=== Liga ACB ===
Player	GP	GS	MPG	2FG%	3FG%	FT%	RPG	APG	SPG	BPG	PPG	PIR
Nigel Williams-Goss	30	28	17:54	52.2%	33.9%	88.2%	2	2.8	0.7	0.2	6.4	6.4
Fabien Causeur	38	14	17:19	51.5%	35.7%	74.4%	1.6	1.4	0.7	0.1	6.8	5.6
Anthony Randolph	11	1	11:29	42.1%	30.4%	81.8%	3.5	0.4	0.2	0.1	4.2	5
Rudy Fernández	19	0	12:56	70%	38.6%	46.2%	1.5	0.7	0.5	0.1	4.5	3.4
Alberto Abalde	25	11	16:14	55.8%	26.6%	78.3%	2.2	1.3	0.4	–	5.1	4
Ádám Hanga	28	18	14:37	60.7%	33.3%	60%	1.9	1.3	0.6	0.2	5	4.5
Mario Hezonja	38	9	20:20	60.2%	36.5%	82.6%	4.3	1.3	0.9	0.2	10.1	10.6
Sergio Rodríguez	39	5	15:35	50.7%	46.1%	89.3%	1.6	3.5	0.5	–	6.1	7.5
Gabriel Deck	23	17	20:26	58.9%	46.4%	80.9%	4.8	1.6	0.7	0.1	9.1	12.6
Vincent Poirier	32	6	16:47	55.2%	75%	74.1%	4.3	0.8	0.4	1	7.8	10.7
Petr Cornelie	30	13	15:10	54.9%	26.2%	80.6%	3	0.6	0.4	0.2	4.4	4.9
Edy Tavares	38	34	22:09	68.7%	100%	72.8%	7	1.4	0.7	1.9	10.7	18.5
Sergio Llull	34	1	15:58	43.5%	34.5%	82.1%	1.5	2.4	0.5	–	7.4	7.2
Guerschon Yabusele	36	27	25:37	58.3%	33.3%	74.6%	4.5	1	1.3	0.4	11.9	14.2
Eli Ndiaye	21	2	9:23	46.7%	23.5%	61.5%	2.1	0.4	0.2	0.5	2.3	2.5
Džanan Musa	41	29	20:57	59.4%	46.5%	80.5%	2.5	2	0.8	0.2	14.4	16
Hugo González	4	0	1:47	100%	–	100%	–	–	–	–	1.5	2
Ismaila Diagne	1	0	0:55	–	–	50%	1	–	–	–	1	2
Egor Dëmin	1	0	0:55	–	–	–	–	–	–	–	–	-3
TOTAL				57.4%	36.9%	77.2%	37.1	17.5	9	4	88.2	106.1

Source: ACB

=== EuroLeague ===
Player	GP	GS	MPG	2FG%	3FG%	FT%	RPG	APG	SPG	BPG	PPG	PIR
Nigel Williams-Goss	26	23	15:47	58.3%	38.5%	77.1%	1.3	1.8	0.6	–	7.4	6.6
Fabien Causeur	29	8	12:39	40%	36.4%	77.3%	1.1	1.2	0.4	0.1	4	3.1
Anthony Randolph	8	1	6:05	66.7%	60%	60%	1.2	–	0.4	0.1	3	2.8
Rudy Fernández	20	0	17:23	66.7%	29.9%	100%	2.2	1.5	0.8	0.2	4.3	4.2
Alberto Abalde	24	10	14:22	37%	25%	66.7%	2.1	1.6	0.3	–	2.6	2.9
Ádám Hanga	27	16	13:22	38.9%	36.2%	72.4%	1.8	1.7	0.6	0.2	4.2	4.1
Mario Hezonja	39	12	20:32	51.1%	43.3%	75.8%	3	1.1	0.7	0.2	10.6	9.2
Sergio Rodríguez	40	3	14:48	50.6%	36.8%	83.3%	1.5	4.4	0.4	–	4.9	6.8
Gabriel Deck	31	23	26:02	63.4%	31.9%	84.5%	5.4	1.9	0.5	0.1	12.3	15.7
Vincent Poirier	32	1	14:38	61.2%	40%	72.7%	4	0.6	0.3	0.9	6.1	8.2
Petr Cornelie	33	17	14:33	71.4%	39.5%	83.3%	3.1	0.5	0.3	0.1	5.8	6.7
Edy Tavares	40	38	25:00	67.6%	–	78%	6.9	1.5	0.9	2.2	11.2	18
Sergio Llull	29	3	16:45	32.8%	29.4%	91.3%	1.2	2.4	0.3	–	6.1	5.1
Guerschon Yabusele	29	16	23:47	56.7%	42.1%	71%	4	1.3	0.8	0.3	9.7	11.4
Eli Ndiaye	15	3	5:39	71.4%	16.7%	100%	1.2	0.1	0.2	0.3	1.1	1.5
Džanan Musa	41	31	23:48	58.6%	37.1%	86%	3.1	2.7	0.4	0.2	14.8	15.9
TOTAL				57.5%	36.7%	80.3%	36.7	19.2	5.7	4	85.4	100.7

Source: EuroLeague
