= 2022–23 Anadolu Efes S.K. season =

Basketball team season

Anadolu Efes
2022–23 season
- President: Tuncay Özilhan
- Head coach: Ergin Ataman
- Arena: Sinan Erdem Dome
- Basketbol Süper Ligi: 3rd seed
- Playoffs: Champions
- EuroLeague: 11th seed
- Presidential Cup: Champions
Home	Away

The 2022–23 season is Anadolu Efes's 43rd season in the existence of the club. The team plays in the Basketball Super League and in the EuroLeague. After winning 2 consecutive championships in the EuroLeague, the team could not make it to the playoffs this season, finishing the league in 11th place.

== Players ==
=== Squad information ===
Note: Flags indicate national team eligibility at FIBA-sanctioned events. Players may hold other non-FIBA nationalities not displayed.

Anadolu Efes roster
Players
Coaches

Pos.	No.	Nat.	Name	Ht.	Wt.	Age
G	0	(United States) (Turkey)	Larkin, Shane (DC)	1.83 m (6 ft 0 in)	79 kg (174 lb)	30 – 2 October 1992
G	1	(France)	Beaubois, Rodrigue	1.88 m (6 ft 2 in)	84 kg (185 lb)	35 – 24 February 1988
F/C	2	(United States)	Singleton, Chris	2.06 m (6 ft 9 in)	108 kg (238 lb)	33 – 21 November 1989
PG	4	(Turkey)	Balbay, Doğuş (C)	1.85 m (6 ft 1 in)	82 kg (181 lb)	34 – 21 January 1989
PF	5	(Turkey)	Efeoğlu, Karahan Tuan	2.03 m (6 ft 8 in)		19 – 13 June 2004
G/F	6	(United States)	Bryant, Elijah	1.96 m (6 ft 5 in)	95 kg (209 lb)	28 – 19 April 1995
SG	11	(Turkey)	Gazi, Erten	1.91 m (6 ft 3 in)	93 kg (205 lb)	26 – 15 June 1997
F	12	(United States)	Clyburn, Will	2.01 m (6 ft 7 in)	95 kg (209 lb)	33 – 17 May 1990
F/C	13	(Turkey)	Demirel, Mehmet Efe	2.13 m (7 ft 0 in)		18 – 4 January 2005
C	14	(Turkey)	Haltalı, Furkan	2.11 m (6 ft 11 in)	95 kg (209 lb)	21 – 2 February 2002
SF	18	(Turkey)	Arna, Egehan	2.03 m (6 ft 8 in)	93 kg (205 lb)	26 – 5 January 1997
G	19	(Turkey)	Tuncer, Buğrahan	1.93 m (6 ft 4 in)	90 kg (198 lb)	30 – 23 March 1993
C	21	(Germany)	Pleiß, Tibor	2.21 m (7 ft 3 in)	116 kg (256 lb)	33 – 2 November 1989
G	22	(Serbia)	Micić, Vasilije	1.96 m (6 ft 5 in)	92 kg (203 lb)	29 – 13 January 1994
PF	24	(France)	M'Baye, Amath	2.06 m (6 ft 9 in)	102 kg (225 lb)	33 – 14 December 1989
C	41	(Croatia)	Žižić, Ante	2.11 m (6 ft 11 in)	121 kg (267 lb)	26 – 4 January 1997
C	42	(United States) (Armenia)	Dunston, Bryant (DC)	2.03 m (6 ft 8 in)	114 kg (251 lb)	37 – 28 May 1986

Head coach

- (Turkey) Ergin Ataman

Assistant coach(es)

- (Croatia) Tomislav Mijatović
- (Turkey) Yakup Sekizkök
- (Turkey) Cenk Yıldırım

Team manager

- (Turkey) Alper Yılmaz

Legend

- (C) Team captain
- Injured

- Roster
Updated: 18 June 2023

=== Depth chart ===
Pos.	Starting 5	Bench 1	Bench 2	Bench 3	Inactive
C	Tibor Pleiß	Ante Žižić	Bryant Dunston	Furkan Haltalı	Mehmet Efe Demirel
PF	Amath M'Baye	Chris Singleton			Karahan Tuan Efeoğlu
SF	Will Clyburn	Elijah Bryant		Egehan Arna
SG	Vasilije Micić	Rodrigue Beaubois	Erten Gazi
PG	Shane Larkin	Buğrahan Tuncer		Doğuş Balbay

(colours: Turkish or homegrown players; foreign players)

=== On loan ===
The following players have been on loan during the 2022–23 season and have professional contracts signed with the club.

Anadolu Efes players out on loan
Nat.	Player	Position	Team	On loan since	Source
(Turkey)	Egemen Güven	C	(Turkey) Beşiktaş Emlakjet	27 December 2022	
(Turkey)	Ömercan İlyasoğlu	PG	(Turkey) Beşiktaş Emlakjet	27 December 2022	

=== Transactions ===
==== In ====
No.	Pos.	Nat.	Name	Age	Moving from		Ends	Date	Source
12	SF	(United States)	Will Clyburn	32	CSKA Moscow	(Russia)	June 2024	June 7, 2022	
41	C	(Croatia)	Ante Žižić	25	Maccabi Tel Aviv	(Israel)	June 2025	June 22, 2022	
24	PF	(France)	Amath M'Baye	32	Pınar Karşıyaka	(Turkey)	June 2024	June 30, 2022	
18	SF	(Turkey)	Egehan Arna	25	Beşiktaş Icrypex	(Turkey)	June 2024	July 1, 2022	
33	PF	(Italy)	Achille Polonara	30	Fenerbahçe	(Turkey)	June 2024	July 20, 2022	
13	PG	(United States)	Isaiah Taylor	28	UCAM Murcia	(Spain)	January 2023	November 1, 2022	
14	C	(Turkey)	Furkan Haltalı	20	Beşiktaş Emlakjet	(Turkey)	June 2023	December 27, 2022	
2	F/C	(United States)	Chris Singleton	33	Free agent		June 2023	January 5, 2023	

==== Out ====
No.	Pos.	Nat.	Name	Age	Moving to		Date	Source
18	PF	(France)	Adrien Moerman	33	AS Monaco	(Monaco)	June 15, 2022	
3	PF	(Turkey)	Yiğitcan Saybir	23	Bursaspor	(Turkey)	June 16, 2022	
23	G/F	(United States)	James Anderson	33	Murcia	(Spain)	June 17, 2022	
33	C	(Serbia)	Filip Petrušev	22	Crvena Zvezda	(Serbia)	June 30, 2022	
2	F/C	(United States)	Chris Singleton	32	Free agent		July 12, 2022	
13	PG	(United States)	Isaiah Taylor	28	Žalgiris	(Lithuania)	January 1, 2023	
33	PF	(Italy)	Achille Polonara	31	Žalgiris	(Lithuania)	January 7, 2023	

== Competitions ==
=== Overview ===
Competition	First match	Last match	Starting round	Final position	Record							
Competition	First match	Last match	Starting round	Final position	Pld	W	D	L	PF	PA	PD	Win %
Basketball Super League	2 October 2022	17 June 2023	Round 1	Winners	39	30	0	9	3,343	3,070	+273	76.92
EuroLeague	7 October 2022	14 April 2023	Round 1	11th	34	17	0	17	2,915	2,842	+73	50.00
Turkish Basketball Cup	14 February 2023		Quarterfinals		0	0	0	0	0	0	+0	—
Presidential Cup	28 September 2022		Final	Winners	1	1	0	0	71	62	+9	100.00
Total					74	48	0	26	6,329	5,974	+355	64.86

Last updated: complete
Source: Competitions

=== Presidential Cup ===
==== Matches ====
28 September 2022	Anadolu Efes	71–62	Fenerbahçe Beko	Ankara
19:00	Scoring by quarter: 23–15, 19–8, 12–13, 17–26
TRT Spor	Pts: Žižić 22; Rebs: Clyburn 10; Asts: Micić 9 PIR: Žižić 25	Boxscore	Pts: Hayes 13; Rebs: Pierre 6 Asts: Calathes 6 PIR: Hayes, Gudurić 12	Arena: Ankara Arena; Referees: Erşan Kartal, Hüseyin Çelik, Can Mavisu

=== Basketball Super League ===
==== League table ====
Pos	Team	Pld	W	L	PF	PA	PD	Pts	Qualification or relegation
1	Türk Telekom	30	25	5	2627	2331	+296	55	Advance to playoffs
2	Fenerbahçe Beko	30	24	6	2596	2344	+252	54	Advance to playoffs
3	Anadolu Efes (C)	30	22	8	2653	2395	+258	52	Advance to playoffs
4	Pınar Karşıyaka	30	21	9	2676	2571	+105	51	Advance to playoffs
5	Frutti Extra Bursaspor	30	17	13	2507	2460	+47	47	Advance to playoffs

Source: Basketbol Süper Ligi
(C) Champions

==== Results summary ====
Overall						Home					Away				
Pld	W	L	PF	PA	PD	W	L	PF	PA	PD	W	L	PF	PA	PD
30	22	8	2653	2395	+258	13	2	1367	1195	+172	9	6	1286	1200	+86

Last updated: complete.
Source: bsl.org.tr

==== Results by round ====
Round	1	2	3	4	5	6	7	8	9	10	11	12	13	14	15	16	17	18	19	20	21	22	23	24	25	26	27	28	29	30
Ground	H	A	H	A	H	A	H	A	H	A	H	A	H	A	H	A	H	A	H	A	H	A	H	A	H	A	H	A	H	A
Result	W	W	W	L	W	L	W	W	L	W	W	L	W	L	W	W	W	W	W	W	L	W	W	W	L	L	W	W	W	W
Position	4	3	2	4	3	5	3	3	3	3	3	4	3	5	4	5	4	4	4	4	4	4	4	4	4	4	4	4	3	3

Source: TBF.org.tr
A = Away; H = Home; W = Win; L = Loss

==== Matches ====
Win Loss

Note: All times are TRT (UTC+3) as listed by the Turkish Basketball Federation.

2 October 2022 1	Anadolu Efes	77–68	Galatasaray Nef	Ataköy, Istanbul
13:00	Scoring by quarter: 15–9, 23–24, 13–19, 26–16
	Pts: Beaubois 21; Rebs: M'Baye 13; Asts: Bryant, Micić 5 PIR: Beaubois 25	Boxscore; Report	Pts: Kabaca 17; Rebs: Angola 9 Asts: Bost, Caloiaro 3 PIR: Angola 15	Arena: Sinan Erdem Dome; Referees: Ali Serkan Emlek, Ahmet Tatlıcı, Çağlar Özkan

9 October 2022 2	Petkim Spor	79–89	Anadolu Efes	Aliağa, İzmir
13:00	Scoring by quarter: 26–22, 22–23, 14–19, 17–25
	Pts: Melson 20; Rebs: Aldridge 7 Asts: Webster 4 PIR: Melson 21	Boxscore	Pts: Micić 17; Rebs: Clyburn, Žižić 6 Asts: Micić 8 PIR: Clyburn 22	Arena: Enka Sport Hall; Referees: Emin Moğulkoç, Erhan Gürsel, Yiğit Gönültaş

16 October 2022 3	Anadolu Efes	88–78	Darüşşafaka	Ataköy, Istanbul
15:30	Scoring by quarter: 22–20, 19–23, 23–17, 24–18
	Pts: Beaubois 23; Rebs: Dunston 7 Asts: Micić 6 PIR: Beaubois, Micić 22	Boxscore	Pts: McCullough 16; Rebs: three players 5 Asts: Özdemiroğlu 6 PIR: Starks 18	Arena: Sinan Erdem Dome; Referees: Mehmet Şahin, Alper Altuğ Köselerli, Serhat Büker

23 October 2022 4	Frutti Extra Bursaspor	88–86	Anadolu Efes	Bursa
18:00	Scoring by quarter: 20–19, 22–26, 30–22, 16–19
	Pts: Clemmons 24; Rebs: Düverioğlu 11; Asts: Needham 5 PIR: Düverioğlu 26	Boxscore	Pts: Clyburn 28; Rebs: Žižić 8 Asts: M'Baye 6 PIR: Clyburn 28	Arena: Tofaş Spor Salonu; Referees: Özlem Yalman, Can Mavisu, Hüseyin Çelik

30 October 2022 5	Anadolu Efes	97–68	Bahçeşehir Koleji	Ataköy, Istanbul
18:00	Scoring by quarter: 25–19, 16–13, 29–17, 27–19
	Pts: İlyasoğlu 21; Rebs: Pleiß 9 Asts: İlyasoğlu 8 PIR: İlyasoğlu 28	Boxscore	Pts: Brodziansky, Savaş 11; Rebs: Brodziansky 6 Asts: Arslan, Shepherd 4 PIR: Brodziansky 16	Arena: Sinan Erdem Dome; Referees: Mehmet Karabilecen, Orhan Çağrı Hekimoğlu, Umut Özgün Ergün

6 December 2022 6	ONVO Büyükçekmece	83–76	Anadolu Efes	Büyükçekmece, Istanbul
20:00	Scoring by quarter: 11–17, 24–21, 22–18, 26–20
	Pts: Harris, Sajus 17; Rebs: Erülkü 10; Asts: Crawford 9 PIR: Sajus 23	Boxscore	Pts: Bryant 18; Rebs: Žižić 11; Asts: Tuncer 4 PIR: Bryant, Žižić 15	Arena: Gazanfer Bilge Sports Hall; Referees: Yener Yılmaz, Mehmet Serdar Ünal, Fatih Güler

19 November 2022 7	Anadolu Efes	88–83	AYOS Konyaspor	Ataköy, Istanbul
18:00	Scoring by quarter: 23–28, 22–11, 20–23, 23–21
	Pts: Clyburn 21; Rebs: Pleiß 8 Asts: Micić 6 PIR: Clyburn 23	Boxscore	Pts: Sulaimon 23; Rebs: Morgan, Şav 5 Asts: Sulaimon 11; PIR: Sulaimon 34	Arena: Sinan Erdem Dome; Referees: Erşan Kartal, Kaan Büyükçil, Sinem Tetik

27 November 2022 8	Manisa Büyükşehir Belediyespor	74–95	Anadolu Efes	Manisa
15:30	Scoring by quarter: 16–31, 18–19, 18–19, 22–26
	Pts: Selden 28; Rebs: Anosike 14; Asts: Cruz 6 PIR: Anosike 24	Boxscore	Pts: Tuncer 23; Rebs: Dunston 14; Asts: Bryant, İlyasoğlu 7 PIR: Žižić 26	Arena: Muradiye Spor Salonu; Referees: Zafer Yılmaz, Tolga Edis, Erhan Gürsel

4 December 2022 9	Anadolu Efes	111–112(OT)	Pınar Karşıyaka	Ataköy, Istanbul
15:30	Scoring by quarter: 27–30, 15–16, 29–23, 19–21, Overtime: 21–22
	Pts: Micić 37; Rebs: Tuncer 7 Asts: Micić 8 PIR: Micić 37	Boxscore	Pts: Angola 31; Rebs: Delgado 15; Asts: McCollum 7 PIR: Angola, McCollum 29	Arena: Sinan Erdem Dome; Referees: Emin Moğulkoç, Fatih Arslanoğlu, Alper Özgök

11 December 2022 10	Beşiktaş Emlakjet	86–99	Anadolu Efes	Istanbul
18:00	Scoring by quarter: 22–26, 24–28, 20–23, 20–22
	Pts: Mooney 28; Rebs: Mooney 6 Asts: Rich 6 PIR: Mooney 33	Boxscore	Pts: Beaubois 25; Rebs: Pleiß 9 Asts: Micić 13; PIR: Micić 30	Arena: Akatlar Arena; Referees: Hüseyin Çelik, Ziya Özorhon, Berk Kurtulmuş

18 December 2022 11	Anadolu Efes	84–76	Tofaş	Ataköy, Istanbul
20:00	Scoring by quarter: 25–18, 18–29, 17–16, 24–13
	Pts: Bryant 30; Rebs: Pleiß 13; Asts: Clyburn, Tuncer 3 PIR: Bryant 31	Boxscore	Pts: Kurtuldum, Milaknis 13; Rebs: Thompson 7 Asts: Uğurlu 6 PIR: Kurtuldum 21	Arena: Sinan Erdem Dome; Referees: Ali Serkan Emlek, Polat Parlak, Musa Kazım Çetin

26 December 2022 12	Fenerbahçe Beko	93–90(OT)	Anadolu Efes	Istanbul
19:00	Scoring by quarter: 24–23, 26–17, 21–14, 8–25, Overtime: 14–11
	Pts: Motley, Pierre 23; Rebs: Pierre 9 Asts: Calathes, Wilbekin 5 PIR: Pierre 30	Boxscore	Pts: Clyburn 39; Rebs: Clyburn 13; Asts: Larkin 6 PIR: Clyburn 41	Arena: Ülker Sports Arena; Referees: Aytuğ Ekti, Özlem Yalman, Ahmet Tatlıcı

31 December 2022 13	Anadolu Efes	77–73	Gaziantep Basketbol	Ataköy, Istanbul
15:30	Scoring by quarter: 18–16, 20–12, 15–27, 24–18
	Pts: Micić 20; Rebs: Arna, Dunston 7 Asts: three players 3 PIR: Dunston 20	Boxscore	Pts: Frankamp 29; Rebs: Miller-McIntyre 12; Asts: Miller-McIntyre 10; PIR: Frankamp 22	Arena: Sinan Erdem Dome; Referees: Yener Yılmaz, Musa Kazım Çetin, Burak Yılmaz

8 January 2023 14	Türk Telekom	85–70	Anadolu Efes	Ankara
18:00	Scoring by quarter: 22–17, 24–22, 14–16, 25–15
	Pts: Bouteille 30; Rebs: Bouteille 8 Asts: Grant 9 PIR: Bouteille 34	Boxscore	Pts: Bryant 20; Rebs: three players 8 Asts: Clyburn 7 PIR: Bryant 24	Arena: Ankara Arena; Referees: Emin Moğulkoç, Polat Parlak, Batuhan Söylemezoğlu

16 January 2022 15	Anadolu Efes	96–77	Yukatel Merkezefendi Belediyesi	Ataköy, Istanbul
19:00	Scoring by quarter: 25–17, 19–19, 30–27, 22–14
	Pts: Larkin, M'Baye 17; Rebs: Žižić 8 Asts: Larkin, Tuncer 7 PIR: Larkin 28	Boxscore	Pts: Heidegger 22; Rebs: Rogkavopoulos 7 Asts: Heidegger 8 PIR: Heidegger, Rogkavopoulos 20	Arena: Sinan Erdem Dome; Referees: Fatih Arslanoğlu, Alper Özgök, Göksun Öz

22 January 2023 16	Galatasaray Nef	70–80	Anadolu Efes	Ataköy, Istanbul
20:30	Scoring by quarter: 19–17, 21–22, 17–18, 13–23
	Pts: Ennis 22; Rebs: Caloiaro 9 Asts: McGee 6 PIR: Ennis 22	Boxscore	Pts: Larkin 19; Rebs: Clyburn 10; Asts: Larkin 8 PIR: Larkin 31	Arena: Sinan Erdem Dome; Referees: Zafer Yılmaz, Ziya Özorhon, Yiğit Gönültaş

29 January 2023 17	Anadolu Efes	90–64	Petkim Spor	Ataköy, Istanbul
18:00	Scoring by quarter: 17–18, 29–11, 20–15, 24–20
	Pts: M'Baye 19; Rebs: Clyburn 9 Asts: Bryant 5 PIR: M'Baye 19	Boxscore	Pts: Chery 11; Rebs: Booth 9 Asts: Prewitt 4 PIR: Arar 17	Arena: Sinan Erdem Dome; Referees: Yener Yılmaz, Ayşe Nur Yazıcıoğlu, Orhan Çağrı Hekimoğlu

5 February 2023 18	Darüşşafaka Lassa	80–83	Anadolu Efes	Istanbul
20:30	Scoring by quarter: 24–13, 19–20, 19–24, 18–26
	Pts: Osmani 31; Rebs: Özdemiroğlu 13; Asts: Özdemiroğlu 8 PIR: Osmani 29	Boxscore	Pts: Clyburn 25; Rebs: Clyburn 11; Asts: Larkin 5 PIR: Clyburn 32	Arena: Ayhan Şahenk Spor Salonu; Referees: Altuğ Köselerli, Mehmet Serdar Ünal, Özge Şentürk Bayraktar

5 March 2023 19	Anadolu Efes	82–63	Frutti Extra Bursaspor	Ataköy, Istanbul
15:30	Scoring by quarter: 22–17, 17–12, 23–14, 20–20
	Pts: Clyburn 22; Rebs: M'Baye 9 Asts: Larkin 7 PIR: Žižić 24	Boxscore	Pts: Auguste, Bitim 10; Rebs: Needham 6 Asts: Al, Clemmons 5 PIR: Needham 10	Arena: Sinan Erdem Dome; Referees: Mehmet Karabilecen, Serhat Büker, Musa Kazım Çetin
Note: The game, originally scheduled for 12 February 2023, was postponed due to the 2023 Turkey–Syria earthquake.

12 March 2023 20	Bahçeşehir Koleji	62–73	Anadolu Efes	Istanbul
18:00	Scoring by quarter: 20–19, 13–19, 10–19, 19–16
	Pts: Arslan 16; Rebs: Morgan 6 Asts: Baygül 5 PIR: Arslan 17	Boxscore	Pts: Bryant 28; Rebs: Bryant 7 Asts: Micić 4 PIR: Bryant 33	Arena: Ülker Sports Arena; Referees: Ali Serkan Emlek, Semih Vural, İsmail Binbir

19 March 2023 21	Anadolu Efes	97–98	ONVO Büyükçekmece	Ataköy, Istanbul
15:30	Scoring by quarter: 31–30, 30–25, 20–18, 16–25
	Pts: M'Baye 25; Rebs: Bryant 6 Asts: Larkin 8 PIR: M'Baye 25	Boxscore	Pts: Crawford 22; Rebs: Sajus, Weber 8 Asts: Crawford 13; PIR: Weber 34	Arena: Sinan Erdem Dome; Referees: Kerem Baki, Alper Altuğ Köselerli, Burak Yılmaz

25 March 2023 22	AYOS Konyaspor	83–99	Anadolu Efes	Konya
15:30	Scoring by quarter: 21–23, 13–25, 19–19, 30–32
	Pts: Sulaimon 28; Rebs: Eddie 10; Asts: Pérez 5 PIR: Sulaimon	Boxscore	Pts: M'Baye 23; Rebs: Žižić 12; Asts: Tuncer 8 PIR: M'Baye 22	Arena: Selçuklu Belediyesi Uluslararası Spor Salonu; Referees: Mehmet Serdar Ünal, Ziya Özorhon, Polat Parlak

2 April 2023 23	Anadolu Efes	78–69	Manisa Büyükşehir Belediyespor	Ataköy, Istanbul
15:30	Scoring by quarter: 14–20, 24–21, 22–18, 18–10
	Pts: Micić 23; Rebs: Pleiß 8 Asts: Larkin; PIR: Micić 29	Boxscore	Pts: Cruz 18; Rebs: Anosike 17; Asts: Roberson 10; PIR: Anosike 25	Arena: Sinan Erdem Dome; Referees: Aytuğ Ekti, Ayşe Nur Yazıcıoğlu, Göksun Öz

9 April 2023 24	Pınar Karşıyaka	98–83	Anadolu Efes	İzmir
18:00	Scoring by quarter: 16–28, 31–19, 30–21, 21–15
	Pts: J.Brown 23; Rebs: Angola 8 Asts: Sipahi 11; PIR: J.Brown 23	Boxscore	Pts: Bryant, Clyburn 19; Rebs: Clyburn 8 Asts: Larkin 8 PIR: Clyburn 23	Arena: Karşıyaka Arena; Referees: Can Mavisu, Ali Şakacı, Tolga Edis

17 April 2023 25	Anadolu Efes	104–88	Beşiktaş Emlakjet	Ataköy, Istanbul
20:30	Scoring by quarter: 24–24, 19–23, 34–26, 27–15
	Pts: Micić, Žižić 19; Rebs: Žižić 12; Asts: Micić 12; PIR: Žižić 35	Boxscore	Pts: Usher 24; Rebs: Güven 7 Asts: Jackson-Cartwright 7 PIR: Usher 23	Arena: Sinan Erdem Dome; Referees: Fatih Arslanoğlu, Semih Vural, Burak Yılmaz

22 April 2023 26	Tofaş	66–63	Anadolu Efes	Bursa
15:30	Scoring by quarter: 20–19, 15–14, 18–18, 13–12
	Pts: Ennis 16; Rebs: Manek 11; Asts: Ennis 4 PIR: Ennis 22	Boxscore	Pts: Clyburn 18; Rebs: Clyburn, M'Baye 10; Asts: Larkin 4 PIR: M'Baye 20	Arena: Tofaş Spor Salonu; Referees: Mehmet Karacbilecen, Kerem Baki, Sinem Tetik

16 May 2023 27	Anadolu Efes	96–91	Fenerbahçe Beko	Ataköy, Istanbul
19:00	Scoring by quarter: 28–28, 19–21, 28–23, 21–19
	Pts: Larkin 23; Rebs: Žižić 10; Asts: Bryant 5 PIR: Larkin, Žižić 25	Boxscore	Pts: Dorsey, Motley 18; Rebs: Motley 7 Asts: Calathes 7 PIR: Calathes, Motley 19	Arena: Sinan Erdem Dome; Referees: Emin Moğulkoç, Ali Serkan Emlek, Ahmet Tatlıcı

5 May 2023 28	Gaziantep Basketbol	82–106	Anadolu Efes	Istanbul
19:00	Scoring by quarter: 22–28, 25–29, 20–16, 15–33
	Pts: Dotson 22; Rebs: Luther 6 Asts: Miller-McIntyre 7 PIR: Frankamp 20	Boxscore	Pts: Larkin, Tuncer 18; Rebs: Haltalı 8 Asts: Micić 5 PIR: Larkin 21	Arena: Ahmet Cömert Sport Hal; Referees: Aytuğ Ekti, Semih Vural, Murat Ciner

13 May 2023 29	Anadolu Efes	102–87	Türk Telekom	Ataköy, Istanbul
18:00	Scoring by quarter: 26–19, 19–18, 34–13, 23–37
	Pts: Žižić 22; Rebs: Žižić 5 Asts: Bryant 6 PIR: Žižić 29	Boxscore	Pts: three players 15; Rebs: Eric 11; Asts: Taylor 6 PIR: Eric 18	Arena: Sinan Erdem Dome; Referees: Yener Yılmaz, Alper Altuğ Köselerli, Ali Köseoğlu

21 May 2023 30	Yukatel Merkezefendi Belediyesi	71–94	Anadolu Efes	Denizli
15:30	Scoring by quarter: 17–21, 16–26, 17–25, 21–22
	Pts: Harris 21; Rebs: Hamilton, Olmaz 6 Asts: Rathan-Mayes 8 PIR: Harris 15	Boxscore	Pts: Tuncer 21; Rebs: Bryant, Dunston 7 Asts: Bryant, Tuncer 5 PIR: Bryant 22	Arena: Pamukkale University Arena; Referees: Zafer Yılmaz, Orhan Hekimoğlu, Sinem Tetik

==== Playoffs ====
===== Quarterfinals =====
Win Loss

27 May 2023 1	Anadolu Efes	104–94 (Series: 1–0)	Darüşşafaka	Ataköy, Istanbul
18:00	Scoring by quarter: 27–18, 31–32, 21–22, 25–22
	Pts: Beaubois 26; Rebs: Clyburn 11; Asts: Larkin 7 PIR: Beaubois 26	Boxscore	Pts: Korkmaz, Özdemiroğlu 22; Rebs: Olaseni 7 Asts: Starks 5 PIR: Korkmaz 23	Arena: Sinan Erdem Dome; Referees: Yener Yılmaz, Fatih Arslanoğlu, Çağlar Özkan

31 May 2023 2	Darüşşafaka	84–86 (Series: 0–2)	Anadolu Efes	Istanbul
18:00	Scoring by quarter: 24–20, 20–19, 19–22, 21–25
	Pts: Olaseni 24; Rebs: Olaseni 12; Asts: Starks 6 PIR: Olaseni 35	Boxscore	Pts: Micić 22; Rebs: Clyburn 8 Asts: Micić 8 PIR: Micić 21	Arena: Ayhan Şahenk Spor Salonu; Referees: Ali Serkan Emlek, Özlem Yalman, Batuhan Söylemezoğlu

===== Semifinals =====
Win Loss

3 June 2023 1	Fenerbahçe Beko	108–66 (Series: 1–0)	Anadolu Efes	Istanbul
18:00	Scoring by quarter: 23–17, 28–20, 26–17, 31–12
	Pts: Motley 18; Rebs: Geyik, Gudurić 8 Asts: three players 5 PIR: Geyik 21	Boxscore	Pts: Bryant 13; Rebs: Bryant 10; Asts: Larkin 6 PIR: Bryant 18	Arena: Ülker Sports and Event Hall; Referees: Kerem Baki, Mehmet Şahin, Ahmet Tatlıcı

5 June 2023 2	Fenerbahçe Beko	90–92 (Series: 1–1)	Anadolu Efes	Istanbul
20:00	Scoring by quarter: 25–16, 20–24, 16–25, 29–27
	Pts: Motley 22; Rebs: Motley 9 Asts: Motley 6 PIR: Motley 26	Boxscore	Pts: Clyburn 35; Rebs: Clyburn, M'Baye 10; Asts: Larkin 6 PIR: Clyburn 35	Arena: Ülker Sports and Event Hall; Referees: Emin Moğulkoç, Ziya Özorhon, Tolga Edis

7 June 2023 3	Anadolu Efes	97–91 (Series: 2–1)	Fenerbahçe Beko	Istanbul
20:00	Scoring by quarter: 22–24, 30–27, 19–27, 26–13
	Pts: Micić 25; Rebs: Pleiß 9 Asts: Larkin 8 PIR: Micić 26	Boxscore	Pts: Wilbekin 23; Rebs: Pierre 6 Asts: Calathes, Gudurić 6 PIR: Hayes, Pierre 19	Arena: Sinan Erdem Dome; Referees: Aytuğ Ekti, Zafer Yılmaz, Mehmet Serdar Ünal

9 June 2023 4	Anadolu Efes	87–78 (Series: 3–1)	Fenerbahçe Beko	Istanbul
20:00	Scoring by quarter: 16–20, 29–21, 20–20, 22–17
	Pts: Micić 27; Rebs: Clyburn 10; Asts: Micić 6 PIR: Micić 28	Boxscore	Pts: Wilbekin 18; Rebs: Motley 9 Asts: Gudurić 8 PIR: Motley 24	Arena: Sinan Erdem Dome; Referees: Ali Serkan Emlek, Can Mavisu, Ali Şakacı

===== Finals =====
Win Loss

13 June 2023 1	Anadolu Efes	82–78 (Series: 1–0)	Pınar Karşıyaka	Istanbul
20:00	Scoring by quarter: 23–14, 20–15, 19–27, 20–22
	Pts: Micić 24; Rebs: Clyburn 11; Asts: Micić 5 PIR: Micić 23	Boxscore	Pts: McCollum 21; Rebs: Kuzminskas 10; Asts: Angola 6 PIR: three players 18	Arena: Sinan Erdem Dome; Referees: Yener Yılmaz, Altuğ Köselerli, Kaan Büyükçil

15 June 2023 2	Anadolu Efes	85–68 (Series: 2–0)	Pınar Karşıyaka	Istanbul
20:00	Scoring by quarter: 21–16, 22–19, 15–19, 27–14
	Pts: Bryant 23; Rebs: M'Baye 6 Asts: Micić 7 PIR: Bryant, M'Baye 24	Boxscore	Pts: V.Brown, McCollum 16; Rebs: Delgado, Durmaz 6 Asts: McCollum 8 PIR: McCollum 20	Arena: Sinan Erdem Dome; Referees: Emin Moğulkoç, Mehmet Karabilecen, Ali Şakacı

17 June 2023 2	Pınar Karşıyaka	74–83 (Series: 0–3)	Anadolu Efes	Istanbul
18:00	Scoring by quarter: 27–28, 19–20, 17–16, 11–19
	Pts: V.Brown 21; Rebs: Delgado 6 Asts: McCollum 11; PIR: McCollum 25	Boxscore	Pts: Micić 29; Rebs: Pleiß 14; Asts: Larkin, Micić 7 PIR: Micić 30	Arena: Sinan Erdem Dome; Referees: Ali Serkan Emlek, Mehmet Şahin, Can Mavisu

=== EuroLeague ===
==== League table ====
Pos	Team	Pld	W	L	PF	PA	PD
9	(Spanish Basketball Federation) Cazoo Baskonia	34	18	16	2919	2836	+83
10	(Basketball Federation of Serbia) Crvena zvezda Meridianbet	34	17	17	2591	2613	−22
11	(Turkish Basketball Federation) Anadolu Efes	34	17	17	2800	2736	+64
12	(Italian Basketball Federation) EA7 Emporio Armani Milan	34	15	19	2534	2611	−77
13	(Spanish Basketball Federation) Valencia Basket	34	15	19	2756	2891	−135

Source: EuroLeague
Rules for classification: All points scored in extra period(s) were not counted in the standings, nor for any tie-break situation.

==== Results summary ====
Overall						Home					Away				
Pld	W	L	PF	PA	PD	W	L	PF	PA	PD	W	L	PF	PA	PD
34	17	17	2823	2752	+71	11	6	1403	1320	+83	6	11	1420	1432	−12

Source: EuroLeague

==== Results by round ====
Round	1	2	3	4	5	6	7	8	9	10	11	12	13	14	15	16	17	18	19	20	21	22	23	24	25	26	27	28	29	30	31	32	33	34
Ground	H	A	H	H	H	A	A	H	A	A	H	A	H	A	H	A	H	A	A	H	A	H	A	H	A	A	A	H	H	A	H	H	A	H
Result	W	L	L	W	L	L	L	W	W	W	W	W	W	L	W	L	W	L	W	L	L	W	L	W	W	W	L	L	L	L	W	W	L	W
Position	3	6	9	8	11	14	15	12	9	7	6	6	7	7	7	8	7	9	8	9	10	9	11	11	11	8	10	10	11	10	10	10	11	11

Source: EuroLeague.net
A = Away; H = Home; W = Win; L = Loss; P = Postponed

==== Matches ====
Note: All times are CET (UTC+1) as listed by EuroLeague.

7 October 2022 1	Anadolu Efes (Turkey)	72–59	(Serbia) Crvena zvezda mts	Istanbul
19:30	Scoring by quarter: 17–14, 18–20, 21–16, 16–9
	Pts: Clyburn 19; Rebs: Žižić 5 Asts: Micić 6 PIR: Clyburn 19	Boxscore	Pts: Bentil 13; Rebs: Lazić, Petrušev 6 Asts: Mitrović, Ivanović 5 PIR: Bentil 15	Arena: Sinan Erdem Dome; Attendance: 14,648; Referees: Benjamín Jiménez, Tomasz Trawicki, Arturas Šukys

13 October 2022 2	AS Monaco Basket (France)	95–92(OT)	(Turkey) Anadolu Efes	Fontvieille, Monaco
19:00	Scoring by quarter: 12–20, 24–15, 22–25, 24–22, Overtime: 13–10
	Pts: James 19; Rebs: Diallo 9 Asts: Diallo 7 PIR: Diallo 25	Boxscore	Pts: Clyburn 28; Rebs: three players 6 Asts: Micić 8 PIR: Clyburn 34	Arena: Salle Gaston Médecin; Attendance: 3,887; Referees: Damir Javor, Carlos Peruga, Elias Koromilas

18 October 2022 3	Anadolu Efes (Turkey)	91–92	(Spain) Valencia Basket	Istanbul
19:30	Scoring by quarter: 21–20, 24–25, 23–21, 23–26
	Pts: Micić 22; Rebs: M'Baye 6 Asts: Micić 8 PIR: Micić 32	Boxscore	Pts: Dubljević 20; Rebs: Dubljević, Alexander 5 Asts: Jones 8 PIR: Dubljević, Jones 18	Arena: Sinan Erdem Dome; Attendance: 12,489; Referees: Matej Boltauzer, Milivoje Jovčić, Miloš Koljenšić

21 October 2022 4	Anadolu Efes (Turkey)	78–74	(Germany) ALBA Berlin	Istanbul
19:30	Scoring by quarter: 22–23, 19–14, 17–23, 20–14
	Pts: Micić 20; Rebs: Clyburn 11; Asts: Micić 11; PIR: Clyburn, Micić 21	Boxscore	Pts: Blatt, Zoosman 15; Rebs: Sikma 7 Asts: Sikma 7 PIR: Koumadje 21	Arena: Sinan Erdem Dome; Referees: Borys Ryzhyk, Uroš Obrknežević, Jakub Zamojski

28 October 2022 5	Anadolu Efes (Turkey)	79–88	(Turkey) Fenerbahçe Beko	Istanbul
19:30	Scoring by quarter: 27–26, 17–23, 18–22, 17–17
	Pts: Micić 19; Rebs: three players 6 Asts: Micić 5 PIR: M'Baye 19	Boxscore	Pts: Wilbekin 25; Rebs: Calathes 7 Asts: Calathes 4 PIR: Gudurić 23	Arena: Sinan Erdem Dome; Attendance: 14,890; Referees: Saša Pukl, Emilio Pérez, Fernando Rocha

3 November 2022 6	Bayern Munich (Germany)	81–78	(Turkey) Anadolu Efes	Munich
20:30	Scoring by quarter: 18–18, 20–21, 24–22, 19–17
	Pts: Winston 16; Rebs: Bonga 8 Asts: Winston 7 PIR: Bonga 17	Boxscore	Pts: Micić 24; Rebs: Bryant 8 Asts: Micić, Bryant 4 PIR: Micić 25	Arena: Audi Dome; Attendance: 6,500; Referees: Daniel Hierrezuelo, Sašo Petek, Adar Peer

10 November 2022 7	Real Madrid (Spain)	94–85	(Turkey) Anadolu Efes	Madrid
20:45	Scoring by quarter: 26–19, 28–24, 15–20, 25–22
	Pts: Deck, Poirier 13; Rebs: Deck, Poirier 5 Asts: Hanga 6 PIR: Hanga 19	Boxscore	Pts: Clyburn 25; Rebs: Clyburn 9 Asts: Micić 8 PIR: Žižić 23	Arena: WiZink Center; Attendance: 7,345; Referees: Milivoje Jovčić, Gytis Vilius, Milan Nedović

17 November 2022 8	Anadolu Efes (Turkey)	96–86	(Spain) Barcelona	Istanbul
18:30	Scoring by quarter: 16–22, 29–19, 21–16, 30–29
	Pts: Clyburn 24; Rebs: Clyburn 6 Asts: Micić 5 PIR: Micić 36	Boxscore	Pts: Laprovíttola 28; Rebs: Şanlı 6 Asts: Satoranský 4 PIR: Laprovíttola 27	Arena: Sinan Erdem Dome; Attendance: 15,290; Referees: Robert Lottermoser, Carmelo Paternicò, Luka Kardum

22 November 2022 9	EA7 Emporio Armani Milan (Italy)	51–80	(Turkey) Anadolu Efes	Milan
20:30	Scoring by quarter: 18–18, 16–16, 7–21, 10–25
	Pts: Mitrou-Long 10; Rebs: Voigtmann 6 Asts: Voigtmann 4 PIR: Melli 13	Boxscore	Pts: Clyburn 24; Rebs: Clyburn 9 Asts: Beaubois 7 PIR: Clyburn 29	Arena: Mediolanum Forum; Attendance: 9,070; Referees: Juan Carlos García, Joseph Bissang, Saulius Račys

25 November 2022 10	Virtus Segafredo Bologna (Italy)	80–85	(Turkey) Anadolu Efes	Bologna
20:30	Scoring by quarter: 18–19, 16–21, 19–23, 27–22
	Pts: Lundberg 22; Rebs: Mickey 7 Asts: Teodosić 4 PIR: Lundberg 20	Boxscore	Pts: Clyburn 21; Rebs: Beaubois 8 Asts: Micić 5 PIR: Beaubois 30	Arena: Segafredo Arena; Referees: Damir Javor, Emilio Pérez, Seffi Shemmesh

1 December 2022 11	Anadolu Efes (Turkey)	82–71	(Greece) Olympiacos	Istanbul
18:30	Scoring by quarter: 13–18, 20–23, 19–12, 30–18
	Pts: Clyburn 24; Rebs: Micić 9 Asts: Micić 9 PIR: Micić 31	Boxscore	Pts: Vezenkov 18; Rebs: Sloukas, Fall 6 Asts: Sloukas 6 PIR: Sloukas 19	Arena: Sinan Erdem Dome; Referees: Sreten Radović, Gytis Vilius, Carlos Peruga

9 December 2022 12	Žalgiris (Lithuania)	60–86	(Turkey) Anadolu Efes	Kaunas
19:00	Scoring by quarter: 19–25, 14–8, 15–30, 12–23
	Pts: Cavanaugh 15; Rebs: Cavanaugh 8 Asts: Ulanovas 6 PIR: Cavanaugh 21	Boxscore	Pts: Beaubois 20; Rebs: Dunston 5 Asts: Beaubois 7 PIR: Beaubois 24	Arena: Žalgiris Arena; Attendance: 15,109; Referees: Oļegs Latiševs, Benjamín Jiménez, Anne Panther

14 December 2022 13	Anadolu Efes (Turkey)	78–83	(Spain) Cazoo Baskonia	Istanbul
18:30	Scoring by quarter: 23–21, 23–15, 12–28, 20–19
	Pts: Micić 17; Rebs: Bryant 5 Asts: Micić 6 PIR: Clyburn 16	Boxscore	Pts: Howard 19; Rebs: Giedraitis, Enoch 6 Asts: Giedraitis, Thompson 3 PIR: Giedraitis 18	Arena: Sinan Erdem Dome; Attendance: 13,243; Referees: Ilija Belošević, Sašo Petek, Amit Balak

16 December 2022 14	Partizan NIS Belgrade (Serbia)	82–79	(Turkey) Anadolu Efes	Belgrade
20:30	Scoring by quarter: 14–10, 14–27, 25–17, 29–25
	Pts: three players 18; Rebs: Lessort 5 Asts: Nunnally 7 PIR: Punter 26	Boxscore	Pts: Beaubois 30; Rebs: Žižić 9 Asts: Micić 6 PIR: Žižić 33	Arena: Štark Arena; Attendance: 13,776; Referees: Miguel Angel Perez, Elias Koromilas, Adar Peer

23 December 2022 15	Anadolu Efes (Turkey)	88–69	(Greece) Panathinaikos OPAP	Istanbul
18:30	Scoring by quarter: 21–13, 21–13, 25–22, 21–21
	Pts: Clyburn 23; Rebs: Clyburn 10; Asts: Micić 8 PIR: Dunston 28	Boxscore	Pts: Bacon 20; Rebs: Papagiannis 7 Asts: Lee 7 PIR: three players 10	Arena: Sinan Erdem Dome; Attendance: 14,942; Referees: Borys Ryzhyk, Milan Nedović, Jakub Zamojski

29 December 2022 16	Maccabi Tel Aviv (Israel)	80–72	(Turkey) Anadolu Efes	Tel Aviv
20:05	Scoring by quarter: 26–19, 18–26, 13–20, 23–7
	Pts: Brown 23; Rebs: Martin 9 Asts: Brown 7 PIR: Brown 23	Boxscore	Pts: Clyburn 20; Rebs: Clyburn 7 Asts: Micić 7 PIR: Clyburn 26	Arena: Menora Mivtachim Arena; Referees: Matej Boltauzer, Joseph Bissang, Uroš Nikolić

6 January 2023 17	Anadolu Efes (Turkey)	78–72	(France) LDLC ASVEL	Istanbul
18:30	Scoring by quarter: 17–19, 12–17, 23–22, 26–14
	Pts: Micić 22; Rebs: three players 4 Asts: Beaubois 3 PIR: Clyburn 21	Boxscore	Pts: de Colo, Lighty 12; Rebs: Fall 6 Asts: de Colo 4 PIR: de Colo 13	Arena: Sinan Erdem Dome; Attendance: 11,976; Referees: Anne Panther, Emilio Pérez, Luka Kardum

11 January 2023 18	Valencia Basket (Spain)	81–71	(Turkey) Anadolu Efes	Valencia
20:30	Scoring by quarter: 16–13, 15–17, 21–26, 29–15
	Pts: Puerto 15; Rebs: Puerto 7 Asts: Prepelič 6 PIR: Puerto 21	Boxscore	Pts: Clyburn 15; Rebs: three players 6 Asts: Micić 8 PIR: Pleiß, Larkin 17	Arena: Font de Sant Lluís; Attendance: 5,042; Referees: Ilija Belošević, Robert Vyklický, Vasiliki Tsaroucha

13 January 2023 19	Barcelona (Spain)	75–80	(Turkey) Anadolu Efes	Barcelona
20:30	Scoring by quarter: 9–21, 19–18, 20–23, 27–18
	Pts: Higgins 17; Rebs: Veselý, Mirotić 6 Asts: Laprovíttola 5 PIR: Higgins 26	Boxscore	Pts: Micić, Larkin 17; Rebs: Micić, Clyburn 6 Asts: Micić 6 PIR: Micić 27	Arena: Palau Blaugrana; Attendance: 7,437; Referees: Borys Ryzhyk, Oļegs Latiševs, Milan Nedović

20 January 2023 20	Anadolu Efes (Turkey)	81–89	(Germany) Bayern Munich	Istanbul
18:30	Scoring by quarter: 21–24, 19–12, 24–23, 17–30
	Pts: Micić 15; Rebs: Bryant 5 Asts: Larkin 7 PIR: Bryant 21	Boxscore	Pts: Hunter 18; Rebs: Hunter 9 Asts: Winston 8 PIR: Hunter 22	Arena: Sinan Erdem Dome; Attendance: 14,510; Referees: Damir Javor, Tomislav Hordov, Maxime Boubert

27 January 2023 21	Cazoo Baskonia (Spain)	114–111(OT)	(Turkey) Anadolu Efes	Vitoria-Gasteiz
20:30	Scoring by quarter: 29–28, 19–23, 22–26, 28–21, Overtime: 16–13
	Pts: Costello 33; Rebs: Giedraitis 18; Asts: Thompson 16; PIR: Thompson 36	Boxscore	Pts: Larkin 21; Rebs: three players 5 Asts: Larkin 6 PIR: Larkin 26	Arena: Buesa Arena; Attendance: 10,156; Referees: Sreten Radović, Anne Panther, Mehdi Difallah

1 February 2023 22	Anadolu Efes (Turkey)	80–70	(Lithuania) Žalgiris	Istanbul
18:30	Scoring by quarter: 16–16, 22–12, 17–21, 25–21
	Pts: Clyburn 19; Rebs: Clyburn 7 Asts: Micić 5 PIR: Clyburn 27	Boxscore	Pts: Brazdeikis 25; Rebs: Hayes 6 Asts: Brazdeikis, Šmits 3 PIR: Brazdeikis 23	Arena: Sinan Erdem Dome; Attendance: 14,032; Referees: Matej Boltauzer, Emilio Pérez, Adar Peer

3 February 2023 23	Olympiacos (Greece)	76–70	(Turkey) Anadolu Efes	Piraeus
20:30	Scoring by quarter: 22–13, 19–18, 18–21, 17–18
	Pts: Vezenkov 23; Rebs: Walkup, Lountzis 7 Asts: Papanikolaou 6 PIR: Vezenkov 21	Boxscore	Pts: four players 10; Rebs: Dunston 6 Asts: Larkin 5 PIR: Dunston 14	Arena: Peace and Friendship Stadium; Attendance: 11,345; Referees: Borys Ryzhyk, Miguel Ángel Pérez, Milan Nedović

14 March 2023 24	Anadolu Efes (Turkey)	90–89	(Spain) Real Madrid	Istanbul
18:30	Scoring by quarter: 18–24, 24–15, 35–21, 13–29
	Pts: Larkin 18; Rebs: Clyburn 7 Asts: Larkin 8 PIR: Bryant 23	Boxscore	Pts: Musa 16; Rebs: Poirier 7 Asts: Musa 5 PIR: Tavares 21	Arena: Sinan Erdem Dome; Attendance: 15,077; Referees: Ilija Belošević, Carmelo Paternicò, Mario Majkić
Note: Originally scheduled to be played on 9 February 2023. Postponed due to the 2023 Turkey–Syria earthquakes.

24 February 2023 25	LDLC ASVEL (France)	89–90	(Turkey) Anadolu Efes	Villeurbanne, Lyon
20:00	Scoring by quarter: 18–23, 31–22, 12–27, 28–18
	Pts: de Colo 20; Rebs: Fall 5 Asts: Bost 6 PIR: de Colo 26	Boxscore	Pts: Clyburn 20; Rebs: Bryant 10; Asts: Larkin 5 PIR: Clyburn 24	Arena: Astroballe; Attendance: 5,560; Referees: Saša Pukl, Seffi Shemmesh, Artūras Šukys

2 March 2023 26	Panathinaikos OPAP (Greece)	82–87	(Turkey) Anadolu Efes	Marousi, Athens
20:00	Scoring by quarter: 21–18, 19–25, 14–21, 28–23
	Pts: Grigonis 23; Rebs: Ponitka 6 Asts: Grigonis 4 PIR: Grigonis 23	Boxscore	Pts: Clyburn 24; Rebs: three players 7 Asts: Larkin 10; PIR: Clyburn 32	Arena: O.A.K.A. Attendance: 3,620; Referees: Sreten Radović, Milivoje Jovčić, Emilio Pérez

8 March 2023 27	Crvena zvezda mts (Serbia)	94–75	(Turkey) Anadolu Efes	Belgrade
19:00	Scoring by quarter: 20–25, 29–20, 19–22, 26–8
	Pts: Campazzo 22; Rebs: Lazarević, Mitrović 4 Asts: Campazzo 7 PIR: Campazzo 30	Boxscore	Pts: Žižić 16; Rebs: Clyburn 9 Asts: Tuncer 6 PIR: Clyburn 21	Arena: Aleksandar Nikolić Hall; Attendance: 6,064; Referees: Robert Lottermoser, Juan Carlos García, Piotr Pastusiak

10 March 2023 28	Anadolu Efes (Turkey)	64–86	(Israel) Maccabi Tel Aviv	Istanbul
18:30	Scoring by quarter: 20–33, 13–21, 15–14, 16–18
	Pts: Clyburn 12; Rebs: Clyburn 8 Asts: Bryant 3 PIR: Dunston 18	Boxscore	Pts: Baldwin 23; Rebs: Nebo 11; Asts: Brown 8 PIR: Nebo 22	Arena: Sinan Erdem Dome; Attendance: 11,673; Referees: Borys Ryzhyk, Tomislav Hordov, Rain Peerandi

16 March 2023 29	Anadolu Efes (Turkey)	84–97	(Serbia) Partizan NIS Belgrade	Istanbul
18:30	Scoring by quarter: 23–11, 14–28, 27–24, 20–34
	Pts: Clyburn 22; Rebs: Clyburn 8 Asts: Larkin 6 PIR: Clyburn 25	Boxscore	Pts: Punter 19; Rebs: Lessort 7 Asts: Exum 6 PIR: Lessort 23	Arena: Sinan Erdem Dome; Attendance: 13,292; Referees: Miguel Ángel Pérez, Robert Vyklický, Ioannis Foufis

23 March 2023 30	ALBA Berlin (Germany)	95–93	(Turkey) Anadolu Efes	Berlin
20:00	Scoring by quarter: 24–21, 25–19, 19–27, 27–26
	Pts: Smith 25; Rebs: Olinde 7 Asts: Sikma 8 PIR: Smith 23	Boxscore	Pts: Micić 30; Rebs: Clyburn, Žižić 6 Asts: Larkin 5 PIR: Micić 26	Arena: Mercedes-Benz Arena; Attendance: 8,995; Referees: Daniel Hierrezuelo, Matej Boltauzer, Hugues Thépénier

28 March 2023 31	Anadolu Efes (Turkey)	89–69	(Italy) EA7 Emporio Armani Milan	Istanbul
19:30	Scoring by quarter: 22–16, 25–16, 21–16, 21–21
	Pts: Larkin 18; Rebs: Bryant 7 Asts: Larkin 5 PIR: Clyburn 25	Boxscore	Pts: Luwawu-Cabarrot 19; Rebs: Luwawu-Cabarrot 6 Asts: Davies, Napier 4 PIR: Luwawu-Cabarrot 18	Arena: Sinan Erdem Dome; Attendance: 10,032; Referees: Robert Lottermoser, Mehdi Difallah, Uroš Nikolić

30 March 2023 32	Anadolu Efes (Turkey)	86–67	(Italy) Virtus Segafredo Bologna	Istanbul
19:30	Scoring by quarter: 13–13, 23–14, 24–11, 26–29
	Pts: Žižić 24; Rebs: Bryant 11; Asts: Micić 11; PIR: Žižić 26	Boxscore	Pts: Mannion 17; Rebs: Ojeleye 7 Asts: Mannion 6 PIR: Mannion 20	Arena: Sinan Erdem Dome; Attendance: 10,792; Referees: Saša Pukl, Luka Kardum, Sébastien Clivaz

6 April 2023 33	Fenerbahçe Beko (Turkey)	103–86	(Turkey) Anadolu Efes	Istanbul
19:45	Scoring by quarter: 23–17, 25–23, 24–24, 31–22
	Pts: Hayes 26; Rebs: Pierre 8 Asts: three players 4 PIR: Hayes 32	Boxscore	Pts: Clyburn 21; Rebs: Žižić 7 Asts: Larkin 6 PIR: Clyburn 24	Arena: Ülker Sports and Event Hall; Attendance: 11,709; Referees: Juan Carlos García, Damir Javor, Tomislav Hordov

14 April 2023 32	Anadolu Efes (Turkey)	87–72	(France) AS Monaco Basket	Istanbul
19:30	Scoring by quarter: 23–16, 18–23, 19–15, 27–18
	Pts: Pleiß 21; Rebs: Pleiß 12; Asts: Micić, Larkin 6 PIR: Pleiß 25	Boxscore	Pts: Makoundou 16; Rebs: James, Hall 9 Asts: James, Okobo 4 PIR: Makoundou 19	Arena: Sinan Erdem Dome; Attendance: 10,066; Referees: Borys Ryzhyk, Oļegs Latiševs, Milan Nedović

=== Turkish Basketball Cup ===
==== Quarterfinals ====
Win Loss

14 February 2023 QF	Bahçeşehir Koleji	Suspended	Anadolu Efes	Istanbul
18:00
TRT Spor Yıldız		Boxscore		Arena: Ülker Sports Arena
Note: Originally scheduled to be played on 14 February 2023. Suspended due to the 2023 Turkey–Syria earthquakes.
