= Trofeo Costa del Sol (basketball) =

Basketball competition in Spain

The Trofeo Costa del Sol is a basketball friendly competition, held in the county of Costa del Sol of the Málaga province in Spain.

The competition inaugurated in 2011 and continued to be one of the competitions played before the upcoming season of the Liga ACB.

== Performance by club ==
| Club | Winners | Winning years |
|---|---|---|
| Real Madrid | 7 | 2012, 2017, 2018, 2019, 2022, 2025, 2026 |
| Baloncesto Málaga | 5 | 2011, 2013, 2021, 2023, 2024 |
| Valencia Basket | 1 | 2014 |
| BC Khimki | 1 | 2015 |
| Fenerbahçe | 1 | 2016 |
