= 2019–20 Armenia Basketball League A =

- Season: 2019–20
- Teams: 6

The 2019–20 Armenia Basketball League A is the second season of the basketball first division of Armenia.

Aragats are the defending champions.

== Competition format ==
The regular season consists in a double-legged round-robin tournament where the six teams qualify for the playoffs.

== Teams ==
Six teams will take part in the competition. Gyumri and Erebuni replaced Artsakh and Artik.

Former Erebuni changed its name to Yerevan.

Club	Place	Arena
Aragats	Yerevan	Mika Sports Arena
Erebuni	Yerevan	Mika Sports Arena
FIMA	Yerevan	Mika Sports Arena
Gyumri	Gyumri	
Urartu V-Bet	Vanadzor	Armenia Sports Arena
Yerevan	Yerevan	

== Regular season ==
=== League table ===
Pos	Team	Pld	W	L	PF	PA	PD	Pts	Qualification
1	Aragats	20	17	3	2179	1718	+461	37	Qualification to the semifinals
2	Urartu V-Bet	20	17	3	2144	1678	+466	37	Qualification to the semifinals
3	FIMA	20	8	12	1848	2027	−179	28	Qualification to the quarterfinals
4	Yerevan (Note: One point deducted.)	20	9	11	1955	2063	−108	28	Qualification to the quarterfinals
5	Erebuni	20	6	14	1717	1942	−225	26	Qualification to the quarterfinals
6	Gyumri	20	3	17	1641	2056	−415	23	Qualification to the quarterfinals

Source: FIBA Organizer

=== Results ===
Home \ Away	ARA	ERB	FIM	GYU	URA	YER	ARA	ERB	FIM	GYU	URA	YER
Aragats	—	103–78	137–70	93–88	105–81	111–97	—	141–100	95–86	128–101	74–91	106–91
Erebuni	83–110	—	94–84	97–81	58–102	79–101	88–94	—	80–88	76–63	77–135	92–74
FIMA	86–95	97–84	—	85–95	91–109	86–115	86–95	97–89	—	117–90	99–118	105–100
Gyumri	72–97	76–79	102–79	—	77–96	80–110	53–123	76–95	91–97	—	80–143	104–100
Urartu V-Bet	103–98	120–98	101–71	111–74	—	126–97	70–93	107–96	92–72	115–58	—	119–81
Yerevan	85–151	102–86	108–114	100–97	89–120	—	103–99	91–88	106–132	115–83	90–85	—

Source: FIBA Organizer
Legend: Blue = home team win; Red = away team win.

== Playoffs ==
The playoffs are played in a best-of-seven format, with the series starting 1–1 or 2–0 depending on the head-to-head games in the regular season. The other five matches are played as 1-1-1-1-1.

Final will be played in a best-of-nine format with the same format as in the previous series.

=== Bracket ===
Quarter-finals
FIMA	2
Gyumri	0
Yerevan	1
Erebuni	1

Semi-finals
Aragats
Urartu Vivaro

Final

=== Quarter-finals ===
Team 1	Series	Team 2	Game 1	Game 2	Game 3	Game 4	Game 5	Game 6
FIMA	2–0	Gyumri	2–0					
Yerevan	1–1	Erebuni	1–1					

== See also ==
- Basketball Federation of Armenia
