= 2018–19 Armenia Basketball League A =

- Season: 2018–19
- Duration: 7 October 2018 – May 2019
- Teams: 6

Finals
- Champions: Aragats (1st title)
- Runners-up: Urartu Vivaro

The 2018–19 Armenia Basketball League A is the second season of the basketball first division of Armenia.

Artsakh are the defending champions.

== Competition format ==
The regular season consists in a double-legged round-robin tournament where the six teams qualify for the playoffs.

== Teams ==
Location of teams in 2018–19 League A

Six teams will take part in the competition after the withdrawal of 3 teams -Engineer, Shirak and Grand Sport-, and the admission of 2 teams -Aragats and Erebuni-.

Two teams were relocated: Urartu Vivaro from Yerevan to Vanadzor and Artsakh from Stepanakert to Yerevan.

Club	Place	Arena
Aragats	Yerevan	Mika Sports Arena
Artik Man Holding	Artik	Artik Sports School
Artsakh	Yerevan	Mika Sports Arena
Erebuni	Yerevan	Mika Sports Arena
FIMA	Yerevan	Mika Sports Arena
Urartu Vivaro	Vanadzor	Armenia Sports Arena

== Regular season ==
=== League table ===
Pos	Team	Pld	W	L	PF	PA	PD	Pts	Qualification
1	Aragats	20	14	6	1833	1631	+202	34	Qualification to the semifinals
2	Urartu Vivaro	20	12	8	1663	1638	+25	32	Qualification to the semifinals
3	Artsakh	20	11	9	1858	1834	+24	31	Qualification to the quarterfinals
4	Artik Man Holding (Note: Two points docked.)	20	12	8	1570	1497	+73	30	Qualification to the quarterfinals
5	FIMA	20	6	14	1553	1712	−159	26	Qualification to the quarterfinals
6	Erebuni	20	4	16	1499	1664	−165	24	Qualification to the quarterfinals

Source: Basketball Federation of Armenia

=== Results ===
Home \ Away	ARA	ART	ARS	ERE	FIM	URA	ARA	ART	ARS	ERE	FIM	URA
Aragats	—	81–73	114–73	85–80	98–79	84–64	—	20–0 (Note: Game conceded to Aragats as Artik did not present to the match.)	97–103	117–96	90–94	100–76
Artik Man Holding	92–96	—	97–91	89–73	99–79	80–85	80–74	—	87–85	100–76	109–67	74–71
Artsakh	122–104	82–97	—	91–83	77–88	85–91	116–109	102–82	—	80–67	115–93	107–102
Erebuni	73–98	80–83	94–91	—	87–80	72–73	59–77	73–86	84–95	—	(Note: Game was not played. It counted as a loss for both teams.)	79–77
FIMA	97–103	68–89	88–73	102–91	—	95–98	76–101	20–0 (Note: Game conceded to FIMA as Artik did not present to the match.)	96–109	103–97	—	86–105
Urartu Vivaro	99–91	81–73	77–80	59–70	64–58	—	79–94	93–80	84–81	78–65	107–84	—

Source: Basketball Federation of Armenia
Legend: Blue = home team win; Red = away team win.

== Playoffs ==
The playoffs are played in a best-of-seven format, with the series starting 1–1 or 2–0 depending on the head-to-head games in the regular season. The other five matches are played as 1-1-1-1-1.

Final will be played in a best-of-nine format with the same format as in the previous series.

=== Bracket ===
Quarter-finals
Artik Man Holding	4
FIMA	1
Artsakh	4
Erebuni	0

Semi-finals
Aragats	4
Artik Man Holding	1
Urartu Vivaro	4
Artsakh	3

Final
Aragats	5
Urartu Vivaro	1

=== Quarter-finals ===
Team 1	Series	Team 2	Game 1	Game 2	Game 3	Game 4	Game 5	Game 6
Artik Man Holding	4–1	FIMA	1–1	123–84	121–96	20–0		
Artsakh	4–0	Erebuni	2–0	92–62	83–74			

=== Semi-finals ===
Team 1	Series	Team 2	Game 1	Game 2	Game 3	Game 4	Game 5	Game 6
Aragats	4–1	Artik Man Holding	1–1	107–101	86–74	92–90		
Urartu Vivaro	4–3	Artsakh	1–1	97–105	77–81	80–74	71–68	85–80

=== Finals ===
Team 1	Series	Team 2	Game 1	Game 2	Game 3	Game 4	Game 5	Game 6	Game 7
Aragats	5–1	Urartu Vivaro	2–0	83–79	89–93	103–61	97–87		

== Final standings ==
Pos	Team	Pld	W	L
1	Aragats	27	20	7
2	Urartu Vivaro	29	16	13
3	Artsakh	27	15	12
4	Artik Man Holding	26	15	11
5	FIMA	23	6	17
6	Erebuni	22	4	18
