= 2022 FIBA European Championship for Small Countries =

Basketball tournament

Tournament details
- Host country: Malta
- City: Ta' Qali
- Dates: 28 June – 3 July 2022
- Teams: 6

Final positions
- Champions: Armenia (2nd title)
- Runners-up: Malta
- Third place: Andorra
- Fourth place: Azerbaijan

Tournament statistics
- MVP: (Armenia) Chris Jones
- Top scorer: (Malta) Samuel Deguara (Armenia) Chris Jones (24.5 ppg)
- Top rebounds: (Malta) Samuel Deguara (12.5 rpg)
- Top assists: (Armenia) Chris Jones (7.3 apg)

Official website
- www.fiba.basketball

The 2022 FIBA European Championship for Small Countries was the 18th edition of this competition. It took place in Ta' Qali, Malta, from 28 June to 3 July 2022. Ireland were the defending champions; but they didn't participate in this edition.

== Participating teams ==
Ireland, Moldova and Norway did not participate this season. They were replaced by Armenia, winners in 2016, which was about to come back to competition after its withdrawal from the EuroBasket 2021 pre-qualifiers, and Azerbaijan, winners in 2006 and 2008, which was set for a comeback to competition since its participation in the EuroBasket 2013 qualification.

Team	App	Last	Best placement in tournament	Rank
Andorra	15th	2021	Champion (1998, 2000, 2004, 2012, 2014)	88
Armenia	2nd	2016	Champion (2016)	93
Azerbaijan	4th	2008	Champion (2006, 2008)	NR
Gibraltar	18th	2021	Fourth place (1998, 2018)	148
Malta	18th	2021	Champion (2018)	94
San Marino	17th	2021	Champion (2002)	123

== Group phase ==
All times are local (Central European Summer Time – UTC+2).

=== Group A ===
Pos	Team	Pld	W	L	PF	PA	PD	Pts	Qualification
1	Malta (H)	2	2	0	145	141	+4	4	Semifinals
2	Andorra	2	1	1	142	141	+1	3	Quarterfinals
3	Azerbaijan	2	0	2	140	145	−5	2	Quarterfinals

Source: FIBA
(H) Hosts

28 June 2022
18:30

Boxscore

Malta	73–71	Azerbaijan
Scoring by quarter: 16−8, 12−17, 21−27, 24−19
Pts: Deguara 28; Rebs: Deguara, Kahler 11; Asts: Kahler 8		Pts: Davis 22; Rebs: Haciyeva 10; Asts: Davis 4

Ta' Qali Sports Pavilion, Ta' Qali
Referees: Nikola Perlić (CRO), Alessandro Perciavalle (ITA), Tomi Panov (MKD)

29 June 2022
16:15

Boxscore

Azerbaijan	69–72	Andorra
Scoring by quarter: 16−17, 22−23, 17−18, 14−14
Pts: Haciyeva 25; Rebs: Haciyeva 12; Asts: Davis 6		Pts: Colom 21; Rebs: Bartolome 8 Asts: Colom 6

Ta' Qali Sports Pavilion, Ta' Qali
Referees: Can Mavisu (TUR), Alessandro Perciavalle (ITA), Alessandro Perciavalle (GIB)

30 June 2022
18:30

Boxscore

Andorra	70–72	Malta
Scoring by quarter: 13−22, 15−15, 26−18, 16−17
Pts: Bartolome, Colom 20; Rebs: Gabriel, Serrato 5 Asts: Fernández 8		Pts: Deguara 25; Rebs: Deguara, Kahler 10; Asts: Bugeja 5

Ta' Qali Sports Pavilion, Ta' Qali
Referees: Nikola Perlić (CRO), Tomi Panov (MKD), James Kerry Dominique (GIB)

=== Group B ===
Pos	Team	Pld	W	L	PF	PA	PD	Pts	Qualification
1	Armenia	2	2	0	178	129	+49	4	Semifinals
2	San Marino	2	1	1	127	125	+2	3	Quarterfinals
3	Gibraltar	2	0	2	110	161	−51	2	Quarterfinals

Source: FIBA

28 June 2022
16:15

Boxscore

San Marino	61–47	Gibraltar
Scoring by quarter: 18−11, 6−7, 21−11, 16−18
Pts: Ugolini 22; Rebs: Biordi 11; Asts: Raschi 7		Pts: Yome 16; Rebs: McGrail 7 Asts: Yome 3

Ta' Qali Sports Pavilion, Ta' Qali
Referees: Henri Hilke (FIN), Alakbar Hasanov (AZE), Igor Esteve (AND)

29 June 2022
18:30

Boxscore

Gibraltar	63–100	Armenia
Scoring by quarter: 15−22, 15−23, 15−31, 18−24
Pts: García 16; Rebs: Culross 6 Asts: Yome 6		Pts: Spight 30; Rebs: Mkrtychyan 6 Asts: Jones 8

Ta' Qali Sports Pavilion, Ta' Qali
Referees: Nikola Perlić (CRO), Henri Hilke (FIN), Vladimir Zanev (BUL)

30 June 2022
16:15

Boxscore

Armenia	78–66	San Marino
Scoring by quarter: 26−19, 16−11, 14−17, 22−19
Pts: Spight 25; Rebs: Khachatryan 12; Asts: Jones 7		Pts: Felici 17; Rebs: Biordi 9 Asts: Raschi 7

Ta' Qali Sports Pavilion, Ta' Qali
Referees: Can Mavisu (TUR), Igor Esteve (AND), Vladimir Zanev (BUL)

== Final round ==
=== Bracket ===
Quarterfinals
1 July
San Marino	51
Azerbaijan	68
1 July
Andorra	66
Gibraltar	57

Semifinals
2 July
Malta	59
Azerbaijan	52
2 July
Armenia	93
Andorra	66

Final
3 July
Malta	68
Armenia	84
Third place
3 July
Azerbaijan	75
Andorra	84

=== Quarterfinals ===
1 July 2022
16:15

Boxscore

Andorra	66–57	Gibraltar
Scoring by quarter: 18−10, 12−15, 12−13, 24−19
Pts: Colom 29; Rebs: Bartolome, Colom 8 Asts: Fernández 5		Pts: García 15; Rebs: Buxton, Culross 8 Asts: Rodríguez 5

Ta' Qali Sports Pavilion, Ta' Qali
Referees: Alakbar Hasanov (AZE), Alessandro Perciavalle (ITA), Vladimir Zanrv (BUL)

1 July 2022
18:30

Boxscore

San Marino	51–68	Azerbaijan
Scoring by quarter: 18−22, 11−12, 12−11, 10−23
Pts: Raschi 20; Rebs: Raschi 9 Asts: Raschi 4		Pts: Hamzayev 21; Rebs: Haciyeva 13; Asts: Pashayev 5

Ta' Qali Sports Pavilion, Ta' Qali
Referees: Henri Hilke (FIN), Can Mavisu (TUR), James Kerry Dominique (GIB)

=== Semifinals ===
2 July 2022
16:15

Boxscore

Malta	59–52	Azerbaijan
Scoring by quarter: 16−12, 12−15, 11−8, 20−17
Pts: Deguara 18; Rebs: Kahler 16; Asts: Bugeja 8		Pts: Haciyeva 17; Rebs: Haciyeva 11; Asts: Pashayev 5

Ta' Qali Sports Pavilion, Ta' Qali
Referees: Alessandro Perciavalle (ITA), Can Mavisu (TUR), Igor Esteve Malmierca (AND)

2 July 2022
18:30

Boxscore

Armenia	93–66	Andorra
Scoring by quarter: 24−19, 28−15, 26−14, 15−18
Pts: Tatevosyan 35; Rebs: Spight, Zohrabian 7 Asts: Jones 8		Pts: Colom 18; Rebs: Colom 7 Asts: Colom 3

Ta' Qali Sports Pavilion, Ta' Qali
Referees: Nikola Perlić (CRO), Henri Hilke (FIN), Toni Panov (MKD)

=== Fifth place game ===
3 July 2022
14:00

Boxscore

Gibraltar	52–62	San Marino
Scoring by quarter: 11−22, 17−14, 12−17, 12−9
Pts: García 17; Rebs: García 10; Asts: Yome 4		Pts: Ugolini 13; Rebs: Ugolini 7 Asts: Raschi 7

Ta' Qali Sports Pavilion, Ta' Qali
Referees: Alakbar Hasanov (AZE), Alessandro Perciavalle (ITA), Vladimir Zanev (BUL)

=== Third place game ===
3 July 2022
16:15

Boxscore

Azerbaijan	75–84	Andorra
Scoring by quarter: 20−24, 16−20, 20−17, 19−23
Pts: Poladkhanli 25; Rebs: Hamzayev 10; Asts: Pashayev 10		Pts: Colom 31; Rebs: Bartolome, Colom 7 Asts: three players 3

Ta' Qali Sports Pavilion, Ta' Qali
Referees: Can Mavizu (TUR), Tomi Panov (MKD), James Kerry Dominique (GIB)

=== Final ===
3 July 2022
18:30

Boxscore

Malta	68–84	Armenia
Scoring by quarter: 19−15, 11−24, 18−23, 20−22
Pts: Deguara 27; Rebs: Deguara 16; Asts: Bugeja 4		Pts: Jones 41; Rebs: Jones 10; Asts: Jones 6

Ta' Qali Sports Pavilion, Ta' Qali
Referees: Nikola Perlić (CRO), Henri Hilke (FIN), Igor Esteve Malmierca (AND)

== Individual statistics ==
=== Scoring leader ===
- (Malta) Samuel Deguara &
- (Armenia) Chris Jones (24.5 points per game)

=== Rebounding leader ===
- (Malta) Samuel Deguara (12.5 rebounds per game)

=== Assists leader ===
- (Armenia) Chris Jones (7.3 assists per game)

=== Blocks leader ===
- (Malta) Samuel Deguara (1.8 blocks per game)

=== Steals leader ===
- (Azerbaijan) Orhan Haciyeva (1.8 steals per game)

== Awards ==
The tournament's individual award were announced after the final on 3 July.

- Most Valuable Player: (Armenia) Chris Jones
- All-Star Five:
  - G (Andorra) Guillem Colom
  - G (Armenia) Chris Jones
  - F (Armenia) Andre Spight
  - F (Azerbaijan) Orhan Aydın
  - C (Malta) Samuel Deguara
