= Armenia men's national basketball team =

Men's national basketball team representing Armenia

Armenia
- FIBA ranking: 92 ▼1 (13 July 2026)
- Joined FIBA: 1992
- FIBA zone: FIBA Europe
- National federation: BFA
- Coach: Rex Kalamian

FIBA World Cup
- Appearances: None

EuroBasket
- Appearances: None

Championship for Small Countries
- Appearances: 2
- Medals: (gold) Gold: (2016, 2022)
Home	Away

First international
- Armenia 83–64 Moldova (Ciorescu, Moldova; 28 June 2016)

Biggest win
- Armenia 92–40 Wales (Ciorescu, Moldova; 30 June 2016)

Biggest defeat
- Armenia 80–129 Austria (Yerevan, Armenia; 24 November 2024)

The Armenia men's national basketball team (Armenian: Հայաստանի բասկետբոլի ազգային հավաքական, Hayastani basketboli azgayin havak'akan) represents Armenia in international basketball. The team is controlled by the Basketball Federation of Armenia.

After gaining independence from the Soviet Union, the national team did not take part in international competition until the 2016 FIBA European Championship for Small Countries, where they won the gold medal. Armenia would win the tournament once again in 2022.

== History ==
Armenia gained independence from the Soviet Union in 1991. They would become a member of FIBA in 1992. Although the national team would not enter the international scene until the 2016 FIBA European Championship for Small Countries. Armenia went on to win the tournament by defeating Andorra in the final 79–71.

After Armenia's triumph at their maiden competition, they entered European Pre-Qualifiers for the 2019 FIBA World Cup. Their first two matches during World Cup pre-qualifying were home victories in Yerevan against Slovakia and Sweden. However, Armenia would only win one out of their next four matches, to finish the pre-qualifiers at a record of (3–3); failing to advance. Following Armenia's ouster from World Cup qualifying, the team participated in the second round of EuroBasket 2022 Pre-Qualifiers. Armenia would eventually finish the round with a (2–2) record, before having to withdraw from qualifying due to financial constraints.

In 2022, Armenia made its return to international play by entering the 2022 FIBA European Championship for Small Countries. The national team would make it all the way to the final to beat Malta 84–68, and finishing the tournament undefeated.

== Competitive record ==
=== FIBA World Cup ===
World Cup					Qualification		
Year	Position	Pld	W	L	Pld	W	L
1950 to 1990	Part of Soviet Union				Part of Soviet Union		
(Canada) 1994	Did not enter				Did not enter		
(Greece) 1998	Did not enter				Did not enter		
(United States) 2002	Did not enter				Did not enter		
(Japan) 2006	Did not enter				Did not enter		
(Turkey) 2010	Did not enter				Did not enter		
(Spain) 2014	Did not enter				Did not enter		
(China) 2019	Did not qualify				6	3	3
(Philippines) (Japan) (Indonesia) 2023	Did not enter				Did not enter		
(Qatar) 2027	Did not qualify				4	2	2
(France) 2031	To be determined				To be determined		
Total	0/9				10	5	5

=== Championship for Small Countries ===
FIBA European Championship for Small Countries
Year	Position	Pld	W	L
(Moldova) 2016	1st place, gold medalist(s)	5	4	1
(Malta) 2022	1st place, gold medalist(s)	4	4	0
Total		9	8	1

=== EuroBasket ===
EuroBasket					Qualification		
Year	Position	Pld	W	L	Pld	W	L
1947 to 1991	Part of Soviet Union				Part of Soviet Union		
(Germany) 1993	Did not enter				Did not enter		
(Greece) 1995	Did not enter				Did not enter		
(Spain) 1997	Did not enter				Did not enter		
(France) 1999	Did not enter				Did not enter		
(Turkey) 2001	Did not enter				Did not enter		
(Sweden) 2003	Did not enter				Did not enter		
(Serbia and Montenegro) 2005	Did not enter				Did not enter		
(Spain) 2007	Did not enter				Did not enter		
(Poland) 2009	Did not enter				Did not enter		
(Lithuania) 2011	Did not enter				Did not enter		
(Slovenia) 2013	Did not enter				Did not enter		
(France) (Croatia) (Germany) (Latvia) 2015	Did not enter				Did not enter		
(Finland) (Israel) (Romania) (Turkey) 2017	Did not enter				Did not enter		
(Czech Republic) (Georgia (country)) (Italy) (Germany) 2022	Withdrew				4	2	2
(Cyprus) (Finland) (Poland) (Latvia) 2025	Did not enter				Did not enter		
(Estonia) (Greece) (Slovenia) (Spain) 2029	To be determined				To be determined		
Total	0/15				4	2	2

== Results and fixtures ==
Win Loss

=== 2025 ===
20 February 2025 2027 FIBA World Cup pre-qualifiers – 1st round	Albania	70–91	Armenia	Durrës, Albania
19:00 (UTC+1)	Scoring by quarter: 17–22, 16–25, 22–22, 15–22
	Pts: Lekndreaj 17; Rebs: Tola 8 Asts: Hysa 6	Boxscore	Pts: Jones 34; Rebs: Tatevosyan 7 Asts: Jones 10	Arena: Dhimitraq Goga Sports Palace; Attendance: 250; Referees: Ioannis Tsimpouris (GRE), Hrvoje Čavar (BIH), Domen Krajnc (SVN)

6 June 2025 Friendly	Armenia	86–62	Costa Rica	Fresno, United States
19:00 (UTC-7)
		Report		Arena: Fresno City College Gymnasium

8 June 2025 Friendly	Armenia	103–90	Costa Rica	Los Angeles, United States
19:00 (UTC-7)
		Report		Arena: Crescenta Valley High School Gymnasium

27 November 2025 EuroBasket 2029 pre-qualifiers – 1st round	Bulgaria	98–88	Armenia	Botevgrad, Bulgaria
19:15 (UTC+2)	Scoring by quarter: 25–21, 26–20, 27–26, 20–21
	Pts: Stoimenov 21; Rebs: Minchev 11; Asts: Bost 9	Boxscore	Pts: Spight 37; Rebs: Melikyan 12; Asts: Vital 3	Arena: Arena Botevgrad; Attendance: 1,900; Referees: Branimir Galić (CRO), Tomasz Łangowski (POL), Luka Manojlović (SRB)

30 November 2025 EuroBasket 2029 pre-qualifiers – 1st round	Armenia	62–74	Norway	Yerevan, Armenia
19:00 (UTC+4)	Scoring by quarter: 18–17, 13–18, 20–14, 11–25
	Pts: Spight 30; Rebs: Melikyan 18; Asts: three players 2	Boxscore	Pts: Frey 21; Rebs: Frey, Rotegård 6 Asts: Frey 8	Arena: Mika Sports Arena; Attendance: 850; Referees: Peter Ženiš (SVK), Alin Faur (ROU), Jan Baloun (CZE)

=== 2026 ===
2 March 2026 EuroBasket 2029 pre-qualifiers – 1st round	Armenia	80–100	Bulgaria	Yerevan, Armenia
20:15 (UTC+4)	Scoring by quarter: 17–22, 18–17, 21–21, 24–40
	Pts: McGhee 35; Rebs: Melikyan, Tatevosyan 8 Asts: McGhee 7	Boxscore	Pts: P. Ivanov 24; Rebs: Minchev 9 Asts: Toshkov 12	Arena: Mika Sports Arena; Attendance: 1,300; Referees: Ciprian Stoica (ROU), Nemanja Vlahović (SRB), Gabrielius Simonavičius (LTU)

27 June 2026 Friendly	Armenia	74–59	Ireland	Los Angeles, United States
17:00 (UTC-7)
		Report		Arena: Eagle's Nest Arena

2 July 2026 EuroBasket 2029 pre-qualifiers – 1st round	Norway	116–103	Armenia	Hønefoss, Norway
19:00 (UTC+2)	Scoring by quarter: 32–20, 31–27, 30–29, 23–27
	Pts: Frey 35; Rebs: Ndow 6 Asts: Frey 7	Boxscore	Pts: Jessup, Spight 25; Rebs: Melikyan 8 Asts: Kirakosyan 7	Arena: Hønefoss Arena; Attendance: 1,000; Referees: Viktor Nagy (HUN), Emmanouil Tsolakos (GRE), Joona Haaja (FIN)

== Team ==
=== Current roster ===
Roster for Friendly vs Ireland and EuroBasket 2029 pre-qualification round vs Norway on June 27 and July 2.

Armenia men's national basketball team roster
Players
Coaches

Pos.	No.	Name	Age – Date of birth	Height	Club	Ctr.
G	1	Gabriel Ajemian	27 – 29 July 1998	1.85 m (6 ft 1 in)	Homenetmen Beirut	(Lebanon)
G	2	Antranik Balian	–	1.85 m (6 ft 1 in)	Pepperdine	(United States)
G	3	Tigran Mkrtumyan	20 – 12 October 2005	1.91 m (6 ft 3 in)	BKMA	(Armenia)
G/F	5	Albert Tatevosyan	32 – 23 November 1993	1.96 m (6 ft 5 in)	Erevuni PFC	(Armenia)
G	7	Edgar Aghabekyan	16 – 7 September 2009	1.93 m (6 ft 4 in)	Bishop Alemany	(United States)
G	8	Daniel Kirakosyan	21 – 8 February 2005	1.90 m (6 ft 3 in)	Temp-SUMZ-UGMK Revda	(Russia)
SG	10	Justinian Jessup	28 – 23 May 1998	1.98 m (6 ft 6 in)	FC Bayern Munich	(Germany)
	11	Andre Spight pos =	31 – 17 February 1995	1.91 m (6 ft 3 in)	Spartans Distrito Capital	(Venezuela)
SF	23	Kevin Keshishyan	16 – 1 September 2009	2.03 m (6 ft 8 in)	Los Altos	(Armenia)
PF	24	Artem Tavakalyan	30 – 24 September 1995	1.98 m (6 ft 6 in)	Free Agent
G	28	Chris Mitchell	–	1.98 m (6 ft 6 in)	Free Agent
F/C	34	Davit Khachatryan	26 – 23 March 2000	2.10 m (6 ft 11 in)	Hatis BC	(Armenia)
F/C	35	Xavier Kilislian	18 – 20 November 2007	2.10 m (6 ft 11 in)	Lethbridge Pronghorns	(Canada)
F/C	77	Yura Melikyan	19 – 22 October 2005	2.00 m (6 ft 7 in)	Latvijas Universitāte	(Latvia)

Head coach

- (United States) Rex Kalamian

Legend

- (C) Team captain
- Club – describes last
  club before the competition
- Age – describes age
  on 2 July 2026

== Head coach position ==
- (Armenia) Tigran Gyokchyan – (2015–2016)
- (Croatia) Nikša Bavčević – (2017–2018)
- (Serbia) Bogdan Karaičić – (2025)
- (United States) Rex Kalamian – (2022–present)

== Past rosters ==
2016 FIBA European Championship for Small Countries: finished (gold) among 8 teams

Armenia men's national basketball team roster
Players
Coaches

Pos.	No.	Name	Age – Date of birth	Height	Club	Ctr.
PG	4	Sergey Polukhin	20 – 17 September 1995	1.87 m (6 ft 2 in)	Cherkessk	(Russia)
PF	5	Andrey Konstantinov	20 – 12 July 1995	1.96 m (6 ft 5 in)	Arsenal Tula	(Russia)
SF	6	Artem Tavakalyan	20 – 24 September 1995	1.98 m (6 ft 6 in)	Delaware State	(United States)
G/F	7	Artur Khachaturyan	23 – 4 August 1992	1.92 m (6 ft 4 in)	Kryvbas	(Ukraine)
F/C	8	Mikael Pogosyan	21 – 8 June 1995	2.05 m (6 ft 9 in)	Thiel College	(United States)
C	9	Zareh Zargaryan	27 – 4 April 1989	2.00 m (6 ft 7 in)	CS Dominguez Hills	(United States)
G	10	Mike Danielyan	28 – 8 November 1987	1.85 m (6 ft 1 in)	Uerdingen	(Germany)
SG	11	Andre Spight	21 – 17 February 1995	1.91 m (6 ft 3 in)	Arizona State	(United States)
C	12	Bryant Dunston	30 – 28 May 1986	2.03 m (6 ft 8 in)	Anadolu Efes	(Turkey)
PG	13	Amiran Amirkhanov	30 – 27 February 1986	1.85 m (6 ft 1 in)	Almaty	(Kazakhstan)
F/C	14	Konstantin Mirzoyants	27 – 30 January 1989	2.04 m (6 ft 8 in)	Tambov	(Russia)

Head coach

- (Armenia) Tigran Gyokchyan

Assistant coach(es)

- (Ukraine) Andrey Pavlenko
- (Armenia) Suren Stepanyants

Legend

- (C) Team captain
- Club – describes last
  club before the competition
- Age – describes age
  on 28 June 2016

2022 FIBA European Championship for Small Countries: finished (gold) among 6 teams

Armenia men's national basketball team roster
Players
Coaches

Pos.	No.	Name	Age – Date of birth	Height	Club	Ctr.
G	1	Gabriel Ajemyan	23 – 29 July 1998	1.86 m (6 ft 1 in)	Compton College	(United States)
PF	2	Andre Zohrabyan	21 – 9 August 2000	1.99 m (6 ft 6 in)	Glendale CC	(United States)
PG	3	Chris Jones	29 – 10 April 1993	1.88 m (6 ft 2 in)	ASVEL	(France)
G/F	5	Albert Tatevosyan	28 – 23 November 1993	1.96 m (6 ft 5 in)	Vahakni City	(Armenia)
G/F	6	Matthew Madoyan	25 – 5 February 1997	1.94 m (6 ft 4 in)	Urartu	(Armenia)
C	8	Georgi Podkolzin	23 – 27 May 1999	2.00 m (6 ft 7 in)	Urartu	(Armenia)
SG	11	Andre Spight	27 – 17 February 1995	1.91 m (6 ft 3 in)	Twarde Pierniki	(Poland)
PG	12	Mkhitar Vardanyan	28 – 3 April 1994	1.80 m (5 ft 11 in)	Urartu	(Armenia)
F/C	21	Arkadiy Mkrtychyan	26 – 10 September 1995	2.04 m (6 ft 8 in)	Urartu	(Armenia)
G	24	Davit Karamyan	21 – 5 March 2001	1.88 m (6 ft 2 in)	New Bayazet	(Armenia)
C	34	Davit Khachatryan	22 – 23 March 2000	2.10 m (6 ft 11 in)	Mad Foxes	(Armenia)
F	35	Zach Tavitian	23 – 17 February 1999	2.03 m (6 ft 8 in)	Zentro	(Spain)

Head coach

- (United States) Rex Kalamian

Assistant coach(es)

- (United States) Peter Dominguez
- (Armenia) Mikael Pogosyan
- (Armenia) Vardan Khachatryan

Legend

- (C) Team captain
- Club – describes last
  club before the competition
- Age – describes age
  on 29 June 2022

== See also ==
- Armenia men's national under-20 basketball team
- Armenia men's national under-18 basketball team
- Armenia men's national under-16 basketball team
- Armenia women's national basketball team
- Sport in Armenia
