= Amiran Amirkhanov =

Armenian professional basketball player

Free agent
- Position: Point guard

Personal information
- Born: 27 February 1986 (age 40) Moscow, Russia
- Listed height: 6 ft 1 in (1.85 m)

Career information
- Playing career: 2004–present

Career history
- 2004–2005: CKS VVS Samara
- 2005–2006: Dynamo Moscow 2
- 2006–2009: UNICS 2
- 2009–2014: UNICS
- 2014–2015: Almatynski Legion Alma-Ata
- 2016–: BC Urartu

Career highlights
- Eurocup champion (2011)
Medals
Men's basketball
Representing Armenia
European Championship for Small Countries
Gold medal – first place	2016 Moldova	National team

Amiran Amirkhanov (born 27 February 1986) is an Armenian professional basketball player, currently playing for BC Urartu.

He represented Armenia's national basketball team at the 2016 FIBA European Championship for Small Countries in Ciorescu, Moldova, where he was his team's best passer and the third-best passer of the tournament.
