= Artur Khachaturyan =

Armenian basketball player

Free agent
- Position: Small forward

Personal information
- Born: 4 August 1992 (age 34) Kryvyi Rih, Ukraine
- Listed height: 6 ft 4 in (1.93 m)

Career information
- Playing career: 2012–present

Career history
- 2013-14: Kryvbas (Ukraine)
- 2016: Urartu (Armenia)
Medals
Men's basketball
Representing Armenia
European Championship for Small Countries
| Gold medal – first place | 2016 Moldova | National team |

Artur Khachaturyan (Armenian: Արթուր Խաչատրյան; born 4 August 1992) is an Armenian professional basketball player, currently a free agent.

He represented Armenia's national basketball team at the 2016 FIBA European Championship for Small Countries in Ciorescu, Moldova, where he was his team's 2nd best scorer.
