= 2013–14 Panathinaikos B.C. season =

Panathinaikos
2013–14 season
- Chairman: Dimitrios Giannakopoulos
- Head coach: Duško Ivanović
- Arena: Olympic Indoor Hall
- Euroleague: Quarterfinalist
- Greek League: (gold) Winner
- Greek Cup: (gold) Winner
- Scoring leader: (Gabon) Stephane Lasme (10.7)
- Rebounding leader: (Gabon) Stephane Lasme (5.0)
- Assists leader: (Greece) Dimitris Diamantidis (4.5)
| Home | Away |

The 2013–14 season of Panathinaikos B.C. was the 51st season of the basketball club in the highest division of Greek basketball. The team won the Greek Basket League this season, along with the Greek Cup. In the Euroleague they were Quarter-finalists.

== Roster ==
Note: Flags indicate national team eligibility at FIBA-sanctioned events. Players may hold other non-FIBA nationalities not displayed.

Panathinaikos B.C. roster
Players
Coaches

| Pos. | No. | Nat. | Name | Ht. | Wt. | Age |
|---|---|---|---|---|---|---|
| SF | 5 | (Greece) | Charalampopoulos, Vasileios | 2.03 m (6 ft 8 in) | 106.5 kg (235 lb) | 29 – 6 January 1997 |
| SG | 6 | (United States) | Slaughter, A.J. | 1.91 m (6 ft 3 in) | 80 kg (176 lb) | 38 – 3 August 1987 |
| CG | 7 | (Greece) | Bochoridis, Lefteris (injured) | 1.96 m (6 ft 5 in) | 91 kg (201 lb) | 32 – 18 April 1994 |
| SF | 8 | (Greece) | Janković, Vlado (injured) | 2.02 m (6 ft 8 in) | 100 kg (220 lb) | 36 – 3 March 1990 |
| PF | 9 | (Greece) | Fotsis, Antonis | 2.09 m (6 ft 10 in) | 113.4 kg (250 lb) | 45 – 1 April 1981 |
| PG | 10 | (United States) | Nelson, DeMarcus | 1.93 m (6 ft 4 in) | 91 kg (201 lb) | 40 – 2 November 1985 |
| SG | 11 | (Greece) | Pappas, Nikos (injured) | 1.95 m (6 ft 5 in) | 97.5 kg (215 lb) | 36 – 11 July 1990 |
| F/C | 12 | (Greece) | Mavrokefalidis, Loukas (injured) | 2.10 m (6 ft 11 in) | 118 kg (260 lb) | 42 – 25 July 1984 |
| CG | 13 | (Greece) | Diamantidis, Dimitris (C) | 1.96 m (6 ft 5 in) | 100 kg (220 lb) | 46 – 6 May 1980 |
| PF | 14 | (United States) | Gist, James | 2.06 m (6 ft 9 in) | 106.5 kg (235 lb) | 39 – 26 October 1986 |
| C | 15 | (Uruguay) | Batista, Esteban | 2.08 m (6 ft 10 in) | 122 kg (269 lb) | 42 – 2 September 1983 |
| PG | 16 | (Greece) | Koniaris, Antonis | 1.96 m (6 ft 5 in) | 86 kg (190 lb) | 28 – 30 September 1997 |
| C | 17 | (Greece) | Diamantakos, Georgios | 2.15 m (7 ft 1 in) | 124.6 kg (275 lb) | 31 – 14 January 1995 |
| SG | 18 | (Latvia) | Blūms, Jānis | 1.91 m (6 ft 3 in) | 86 kg (190 lb) | 44 – 20 April 1982 |
| C | 19 | (Greece) | Papagiannis, Georgios | 2.17 m (7 ft 1 in) | 125 kg (276 lb) | 29 – 3 July 1997 |

Head coach

- (Montenegro) Duško Ivanović

Assistant coach(es)

- (Spain) Josep Maria Berrocal
- (Greece) Sotiris Manolopoulos
- (Greece) Nikos Pappas

Athletic trainer(s)

- (Greece) Savvas Aronis

Legend

- (C) Team captain
- Injured

- Roster
Updated: October 5, 2014
