= Engineer Yerevan =

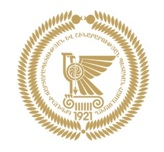
- League: Armenia Basketball League A
- Founded: 2017
- Arena: Olympavan Training Complex
- Location: Yerevan, Armenia
- Team colors: Royal Blue, Red, White
- Head coach: (Armenia) Yeghish Davtyan
Home

Engineer Yerevan (Armenian: Ինժեներ), are a professional basketball team formed in 2017, representing the National University of Architecture and Construction of Armenia.

== History ==
Engineer Yerevan is one of the founding members of the Armenia Basketball League A.

Among seven teams, they occupied the seventh place at the end of the regular season of the inaugural 2017–18 season. However, advancing to the quarterfinals, they were eliminated after losing to Artik BC.

== Season by season ==
| Season | Tier | Division | Pos. |
|---|---|---|---|
| 2017–18 | 1 | League A | 7th |

== Technical staff ==
| Head coach | (Armenia) Yeghish Davtyan |
| Assistant coach | (Armenia) Melik Sandrosyan |
