= Aram Hakobyan =

Armenian footballer (born 1979)

Personal information
- Date of birth: 15 August 1979 (age 47)
- Place of birth: Yerevan, Soviet Union
- Height: 1.75 m (5 ft 9 in)
- Position: Forward

Senior career*
Years	Team	Apps	(Gls)
1996–1997	CSKA Yerevan	3	(0)
1997	Pyunik Yerevan	15	(1)
1998	Dvin Artashat	24	(5)
1999–2002	Spartak Yerevan	51	(45)
2003	FC Banants	27	(21)
2003–2004	Stal Alchevsk	15	(2)
2004–2005	FC Stal Dniprodzerzhynsk	14	(0)
2005–2006	FC Banants	51	(37)
2006–2007	Illychivets Mariupol	11	(0)
2007	FC Banants	11	(4)
2008	Volga Ulyanovsk	1	(0)
2008	FC Banants	5	(0)
2008	Ulisses	12	(1)
2009–2010	SC Erebuni Dilijan	?	(6)

International career
2000–2007	Armenia	16	(1)

Managerial career
- 2018–2020: Banants-2
- 2021: Noah
- 2021–2022: Noah Academy (director)
- 2022: Noah
- * Club domestic league appearances and goals

Aram Hakobyan (Armenian: Արամ Հակոբյան; born 15 August 1979) is an Armenian football coach and a former striker.

== Club career ==
Aram was a top scorer in the Armenian Premier League 2006 season, scoring 25 goals. He was also voted the best player of the 2005 season.

== International career ==
Aram played for the Armenia national football team. He participated in 16 international matches and scored one goal following his debut in an away friendly match against Moldova on 2 February 2000.

== International goals ==
No.	Date	Venue	Opponent	Score	Result	Competition
1.	12 October 2005	Estadi Comunal d'Aixovall, Andorra la Vella, Andorra	Andorra	2–0	3–0	2006 FIFA World Cup qualification
