= Gyokchyan =

Gyokchyan (Armenian: Գյոկչյան) is an Armenian surname. Notable people with the surname include:

- Hayk Gyokchyan (born 1989), Lebanese-Armenian basketball player, son of Tigran
- Tigran Gyokchyan (born 1965), Lebanese-Armenian basketball coach
