= Bryant Dunston =

American-born Armenian basketball player

- Dunston with Olympiacos in 2026

No. 42 – Olympiacos
- Position: Center / power forward
- League: GBL; EuroLeague

Personal information
- Born: May 28, 1986 (age 40) Queens, New York, U.S.
- Listed height: 6 ft 8 in (2.03 m)
- Listed weight: 235 lb (107 kg)

Career information
- High school: St. John's Preparatory School (Queens, New York)
- College: Fordham (2004–2008)
- NBA draft: 2008: undrafted
- Playing career: 2008–present

Career history
- 2009–2010: Mobis Phoebus
- 2010–2011: Aris Thessaloniki
- 2011: Bnei Herzliya
- 2011–2012: Hapoel Holon
- 2012–2013: Varese
- 2013–2015: Olympiacos
- 2015–2023: Anadolu Efes
- 2023–2024: Virtus Bologna
- 2024–2025: Žalgiris Kaunas
- 2025–2026: Olimpia Milano
- 2026–present: Olympiacos

Career highlights
- 2× EuroLeague champion (2021, 2022); 2× EuroLeague Best Defender (2014, 2015); 2× EuroLeague blocks leader (2014, 2018); All-EuroLeague Second Team (2017); FIBA Intercontinental Cup champion (2013); Lega Serie A champion (2026); Italian Cup winner (2026); 2× Italian Supercup winner (2023, 2025); Lega Serie A blocks leader (2013); Lega Serie A steals leader (2013); LKL champion (2025); King Mindaugas Cup winner (2025); 3× Turkish League champion (2019, 2021, 2023); Turkish Cup winner (2018); 3× Turkish Super Cup winner (2015, 2018, 2019); Turkish League blocks leader (2017); Turkish All-Star (2017); Greek League champion (2015); Greek Super Cup winner (2026); Greek League Defensive Player of the Year (2015); Greek League blocks leader (2014); All-Israeli League First Team (2012); KBL MVP (2010); All-KBL First Team (2010); All-KBL Second Team (2009); 2× KBL Defensive Player of the Year (2009, 2010); Israeli League rebounding leader (2012); First-team All-Atlantic 10 (2006)
- Stats at Basketball Reference
Medals
Men's basketball
Representing Armenia
European Championship for Small Countries
Gold medal – first place	2016 Moldova

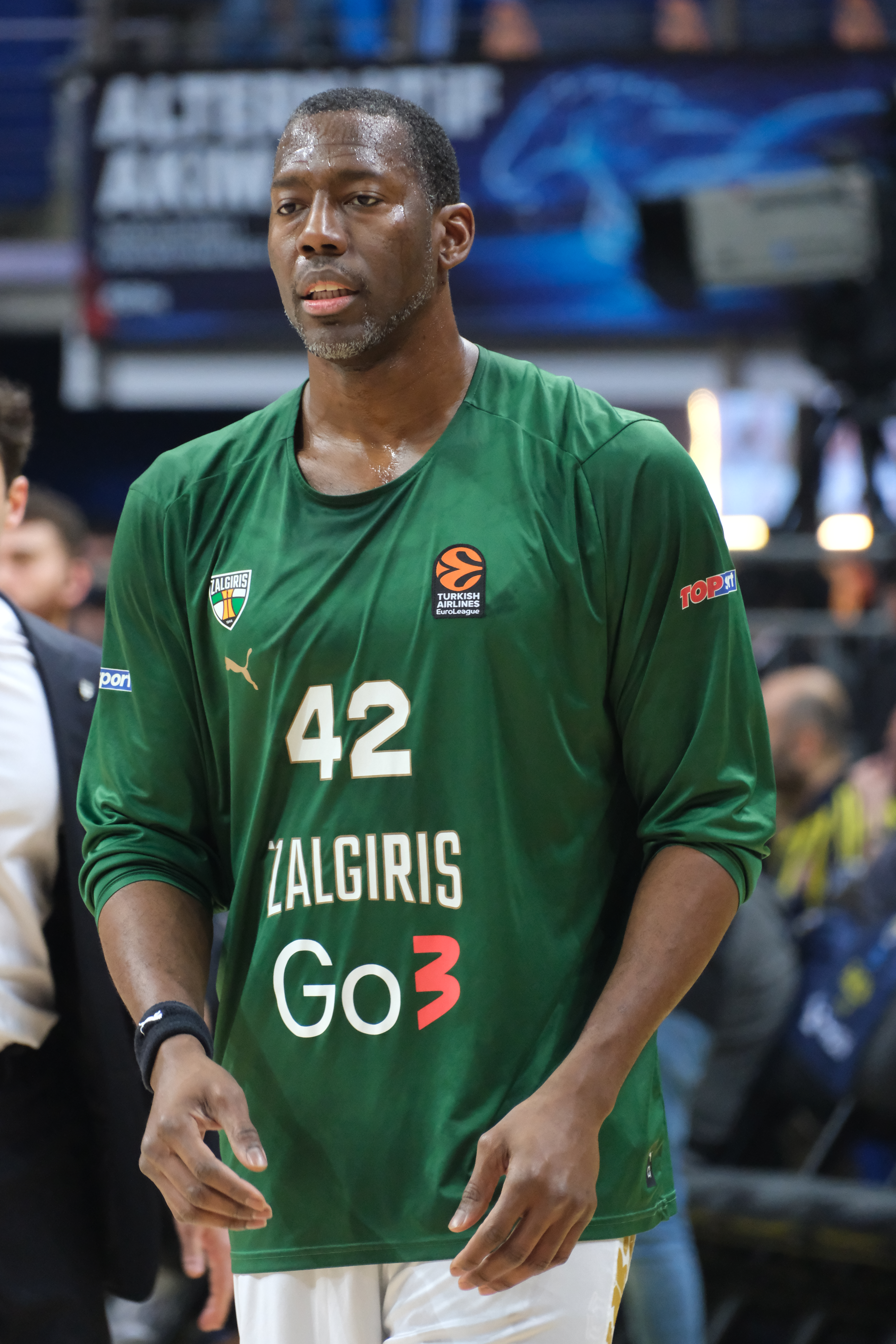
Dunston with Žalgiris Kaunas in 2025

Bryant Kevin Dunston Jr. (Armenian: Բրայանտ Քեւին Դանստոն կրտսեր; born May 28, 1986) is an American-born naturalized Armenian professional basketball player for Olympiacos of the Greek Basketball League (GBL) and the EuroLeague. He also represents the senior Armenian national team in international competition. Standing at a height of 6 ft 8 in (2.03 m), Dunston plays the power forward and center positions.

Dunston has won the EuroLeague Best Defender award twice, and also reached the EuroLeague Final in 2015, while playing for Olympiacos. In 2011–12, he was the top rebounder in the Israel Basketball Premier League. Dunston earned an All-EuroLeague Second Team selection in 2017.

== Early life ==
Dunston was born in southern Kentucky, and grew up in LeFrak City, Queens. He is a graduate of St. John's Preparatory High School.

== College career ==
Dunston attended Fordham University, where he played college basketball with the Fordham Rams. He finished his collegiate career by being named to the First Team All-Metropolitan, Second Team All-Atlantic 10 Conference, and Atlantic 10 Conference All-Defensive Team.

In his college career, Dunston appeared in all 120 of Fordham's games, starting in 118 of them. He finished his college career in second place on Fordham's all-time scoring list, with 1,832 career points, in third place on Fordham's all-time rebounds list, with 993 career rebounds, and as Fordham's career blocked shots leader, graduating with 294 career rejections.

== Professional career ==
Dunston played with Mobis Phoebus in the Korean Basketball League. In 2010, he signed with the Greek League club Aris, but left the team in February 2011.

After leaving Aris, he signed with the Israeli League club Bnei HaSharon. Following the 2010–11 season, Dunston joined the Israeli League club Hapoel Holon. In 2011–12, he was the top rebounder in the Israel Basketball Premier League.

Reports said that Dunston was on the verge of signing a guaranteed contract with the NBA's Brooklyn Nets in the summer 2012. However, he joined the Italian League club Pallacanestro Varese instead.

=== Olympiacos ===
On July 9, 2013, Dunston signed a two-year contract with Olympiacos. In his first EuroLeague season, he averaged 10.3 points, 5.3 rebounds, 1.1 steals and league-leading 1.3 blocks over 29 games played. Olympiacos however finished the participation in the EuroLeague by losing 2–3 to Real Madrid in the quarter-final series. On May 6, he was voted the EuroLeague Best Defender of the season.

On May 6, 2015, he was named the EuroLeague season's Best Defender for the second season in a row.

=== Anadolu Efes ===
On June 23, 2015, Dunston signed a two-year contract with the Turkish club Anadolu Efes. On May 18, 2017, he signed a two-year contract extension with Anadolu Efes.

On May 23, 2019, Dunston signed another two-year contract extension with the club. He signed a two-year extension on July 26, 2020, with an option for another year. On November 6, Dunston was ruled out for a month following an eye injury.

On April 29, 2023, Dunston was involved in a car accident, with his car getting trapped under a semi-truck in Istanbul and suffered minor injuries only. Anadolu Efes later announced that he was in good general health and under observation.

On June 29, 2023, Dunston parted ways with the Turkish powerhouse after eight seasons together.

=== Virtus Bologna ===
On August 25, 2023, Dunston signed a two-year (1+1) contract with Italian powerhouse Virtus Bologna. On 24 September 2023, after having ousted Olimpia Milano in the semifinals, Virtus won its fourth Supercup, and the third in a row, defeating 97–60 Germani Brescia.

=== Žalgiris Kaunas ===
On July 17, 2024, Dunston signed a one-year deal with Žalgiris Kaunas of the Lithuanian Basketball League (LKL) and the EuroLeague. He helped Žalgiris regain the LKL championship and also won the club's sixth consecutive cup competition, the King Mindaugas Cup. He also had a memorable buzzer-beating game winner for Žalgiris against KK Crvena Zvezda in the EuroLeague. On July 11, 2025, he parted ways with the Lithuanian club.

== National team career ==
On June 16, 2015, he was included on the list of candidates of the senior Slovenian national basketball team for the EuroBasket 2015, by team selector Jure Zdovc. However, he didn't get a Slovenian passport in time, so he wouldn't represent Slovenia at the EuroBasket.

In June 2016, Dunston arrived in Yerevan, to represent the senior Armenian national basketball team in the 2016 FIBA European Championship for Small Countries.

== Career statistics ==
Legend
GP	Games played	GS	Games started	MPG	Minutes per game
FG%	Field-goal percentage	3P%	3-point field-goal percentage	FT%	Free-throw percentage
RPG	Rebounds per game	APG	Assists per game	SPG	Steals per game
BPG	Blocks per game	PPG	Points per game	PIR	Performance index rating
**Bold**	Career high

=== EuroLeague ===
†	Denotes season in which Dunston won the EuroLeague
*	Led the league

Year	Team	GP	GS	MPG	FG%	3P%	FT%	RPG	APG	SPG	BPG	PPG	PIR
2013–14	Olympiacos	29	21	24.7	.670	.000	.566	5.3	1.0	**1.1**	1.3*	10.3	15.0
2014–15	Olympiacos	29	25	19.4	.543	.000	.618	4.4	.6	.8	1.1	7.1	9.0
2015–16	Anadolu Efes	24	15	21.0	.604	—	.655	5.0	1.2	.5	1.1	7.9	11.5
2016–17	Anadolu Efes	35	**34**	**28.9**	.551	.000	.679	**6.2**	1.1	.6	1.1	**10.7**	14.6
2017–18	Anadolu Efes	30	28	28.2	.645	.333	.697	5.4	1.3	.7	**1.7***	10.2	**15.5**
2018–19	Anadolu Efes	36	32	26.1	.640	.333	.701	4.9	1.3	.8	1.2	8.9	13.5
2019–20	Anadolu Efes	9	5	25.7	.704	.000	.625	5.3	**1.8**	.8	1.2	10.1	15.1
2020–21†	Anadolu Efes	36	13	21.0	.581	**.500**	.610	3.9	1.0	.9	.9	7.9	10.8
2021–22†	Anadolu Efes	**37**	10	17.9	**.707**	**.500**	.697	3.2	.9	.8	1.0	7.1	10.0
2022–23	Anadolu Efes	29	2	13.6	.623	.000	**.763**	2.9	.6	.8	.4	4.3	6.8
2023–24	Virtus Bologna	36	32	19.3	.614	.333	.476	3.6	.9	.8	.7	4.5	6.7
2024–25	Žalgiris	34	16	15.7	.611	.000	.639	3.3	.9	.5	.5	4.1	5.4
2025–26	Olimpia Milano	17	1	10.9	.615	.000	.739	2.1	.4	.3	.7	2.9	4.7
Career		381	234	21.1	.617	.256	.651	4.3	1.0	.7	1.0	7.4	10.6

== Awards and accomplishments ==
=== College ===
- Atlantic 10 Conference Rookie of the Year: (2005)
- Second Team All-Atlantic 10 Conference: (2005)
- First Team All-Atlantic 10 Conference: (2006)
- Second Team All-Atlantic 10 Conference: (2007)
- First Team All-Metropolitan: (2008)
- Second Team All-Atlantic 10 Conference: (2008)
- Atlantic 10 Conference All Defensive Team: (2008)

=== Professional ===
- Israeli Super League Quintet: (2012)
- FIBA Intercontinental Cup Champion: (2013)
- 2× EuroLeague Best Defender: (2014, 2015)
- Greek League Champion: (2015)
- Greek League Best Defender: (2015)
- Turkish President's Cup: Winner (2015)
- Turkish BSL All-Star: (2017)
- All-EuroLeague Second Team: (2017)
- Turkish Cup Winner: (2018)
- King Mindaugas Cup Winner: (2025)
- Lithuanian Basketball League Winner: (2025)
