= Christopher Mitchell =

Christopher Mitchell may refer to:

- Christopher Mitchell (actor) (1948–2001), British actor
- Christopher Mitchell (anthropologist) (born 1934), British anthropologist

== See also ==
- Chris Mitchell (disambiguation)
