= Artsakh BC =

Artsakh Basketball Club
- League: Armenia Basketball League A
- Founded: 2017; 9 years ago
- Arena: Mika Sports Arena
- Capacity: 1,200
- Location: Yerevan
- Team colors: White, Red
- President: (Armenia) Sevan Aslanyan
- Head coach: (Armenia) Gevorg Shakhnazaryan
- Championships: 1 Armenian League
Home	Away

Artsakh Basketball Club, is a professional basketball team based in Yerevan, Armenia. It was originally founded in 2017 in Stepanakert; the capital of the unrecognized Republic of Artsakh, as the basketball section of Artsakh FC, a Yerevan-based football club. Artsakh BC is a founding member of the Armenia Basketball League A.

== History ==
On 22 October 2017, the founder of Artsakh FC Sevan Aslanyan, agreed to create a basketball section with the aim to play in the newly created Armenia Basketball League A, with Areg Vatyan becoming the sporting director of the basketball section, and Andrey Sarumyan becoming the head coach of the team. Bako Sahakyan, president of the unrecognized Republic of Artsakh, attended their first home league match, played in Stepanakert, the Republic's capital.

Artsakh qualified for the final of the inaugural season by winning the semifinals against Urartu, who were unbeaten during the regular season. In the finals, they defeated Artik for achieving their first title ever.

For their second season, the club moved to Yerevan, Armenia. After this second season, the club did not register for a third one in the A League.

== Season by season ==
Season	Tier	Division	Pos.
2017–18	1	League A	1st
2018–19	1	League A	3rd

== Current roster ==
Note: Flags indicate national team eligibility at FIBA-sanctioned events. Players may hold other non-FIBA nationalities not displayed.

Artsakh BC roster
Players
Coaches

Pos.	No.	Nat.	Name	Ht.	Wt.	Age
SF	24	(Armenia)	Mikaelyan, Bagrat (C)
SG	1	(United States)	Roberts, Joshua		87 kg (192 lb)	27 – 18 April 1998
SF	4	(United States)	Francis, David		107 kg (236 lb)
PG	3	(United States)	Sutton, Justin			29 – 5 December 1996
SG	10	(Armenia)	Harutyunyan, Yura
PG	11	(Armenia)	Beglaryan, Vahe
PG	8	(Armenia)	Harutyunyan, Albert
PG	7	(United States)	Wallace, Malik
SG	13	(Armenia)	Davtyan, Robert
F	12	(Armenia)	Tavrizyan, Robert
SF	0	(United States)	Ervin, Lorenzo	2.00 m (6 ft 7 in)
SG	6	(Armenia)	Mikaelyan, David	1.88 m (6 ft 2 in)		26 – 16 October 1999

Head coach

- (Australia) Shant Ashjian

Assistant coach(es)

- (Armenia) Gevorg Shakhnazaryan

Legend

- (C) Team captain
- Injured

- Roster
Updated: January 17, 2022
