= Basketball Federation of Moldova =

Governing body of basketball

- Founded: 1991
- Affiliation: FIBA
- Affiliation date: 1992
- Regional affiliation: FIBA Europe
- Headquarters: Chișinău
- President: Alexander Abramciuc

Official website
- moldova.basketball

The Basketball Federation of Moldova (Romanian: Federația de Baschet din Moldova) is the governing body of basketball in Moldova. It was founded in 1991, and are headquartered in Chișinău.

The Basketball Federation of Moldova operates the Moldova men's national team and Moldova women's national team. They organize national competitions in Moldova, for both the men's and women's senior teams and also the youth national basketball teams.

The top professional league in Moldova is the Moldovan National Division.

== See also ==
- Moldova men's national basketball team
- Moldova men's national under-20 basketball team
- Moldova men's national under-18 basketball team
- Moldova men's national under-16 basketball team
- Moldova women's national basketball team
- Moldova women's national under-18 basketball team
- Moldova women's national under-16 basketball team
