= 2017–18 Armenia Basketball League A =

- Season: 2017–18
- Duration: 21 October 2017 – 18 April 2018
- Teams: 7

Regular season
- Top seed: Urartu

Finals
- Champions: Artsakh (1st title)
- Runners-up: Artik
- Semifinalists: FIMA; Urartu

The 2017–18 Armenia Basketball League A season, was the inaugural season of the new official competition of basketball first division in Armenia.

Artsakh won the title after doing a perfect 6–0 in the playoffs.

== Competition format ==
After several negotiations, finally seven teams joined the competition, consisting in a round-robin tournament where the best teams would qualify for the playoffs. The best teams are able for qualifying to the European competitions.

The regular season consisted in a double-legged round-robin tournament where the first qualified would join directly the semifinals. The other six teams would face in the quarterfinals.

== Teams ==
Locations of the 2017–18 Armenia Basketball League A teams

Seven teams took part in the inaugural season of the competition.

Club	Place	Arena
Artik	Artik	Artik Sports School
Artsakh	Stepanakert	Artsakh State University Sports Hall
Engineer	Yerevan	Olympavan Training Complex
FIMA	Yerevan	Olympavan Training Complex
Grand Sport	Yerevan	Grand Sport Complex
Shirak	Gyumri	Aram Sargsyan Sports Hall
Urartu	Yerevan	Olympavan Training Complex

== Regular season ==
The regular season started on 21 October 2017 and ended on 20 February 2018.

=== League table ===
Pos	Team	Pld	W	L	PF	PA	PD	Pts	Qualification
1	Urartu	12	12	0	1058	766	+292	24	Qualification to semifinals
2	Artik	12	8	4	935	912	+23	20	Qualification to quarterfinals
3	FIMA	12	8	4	1029	980	+49	20	Qualification to quarterfinals
4	Artsakh	12	6	6	1003	957	+46	18	Qualification to quarterfinals
5	Shirak	12	3	9	870	960	−90	15	Qualification to quarterfinals
6	Grand Sport	12	3	9	843	976	−133	15	Qualification to quarterfinals
7	Engineer	12	2	10	717	904	−187	14	Qualification to quarterfinals

Source: Basketball Federation of Armenia

=== Results ===
Home \ Away	ART	ARS	ENG	FIM	GSP	SHI	URA
Artik	—	76–88	61–48	99–89	87–69	82–71	62–88
Artsakh	77–82	—	82–63	88–91	110–91	88–67	69–106
Engineer	71–79	65–62	—	67–85	63–74	66–56	52–73
FIMA	95–87	94–83	108–66	—	78–57	76–75	75–103
Grand Sport	67–86	63–89	69–40	74–72	—	75–82	63–88
Shirak	77–80	79–101	69–53	93–98	75–73	—	60–76
Urartu	72–54	80–66	86–63	88–68	106–68	92–66	—

Source: Basketball Federation of Armenia
Legend: Blue = home team win; Red = away team win.

== Playoffs ==
Playoffs started on 2 March 2018. Urartu, as winner of the regular season, was directly qualified for the semifinals. Teams that placed better at the end of the regular season played games 1 and 3 at home.

The final was played in a double-legged format at the Mika Sports Arena, Yerevan. These games were played on 14 and 18 April 2018.

Quarterfinals
Artsakh	111	124
Shirak	81	91
Artik	91	83
Engineer	63	57
FIMA	88	109
Grand Sport	86	90

Semifinals
Urartu	70	88
Artsakh	76	90
Artik	111	88
FIMA	87	74

Finals
Artsakh	100	98
Artik	74	90

Third place
Urartu	102	115
FIMA	78	70

== Final standings ==
Pos	Team	Pld	W	L
1	Artsakh	18	12	6
2	Artik	18	12	6
3	Urartu	16	14	2
4	FIMA	16	10	6
5	Shirak	14	3	11
6	Grand Sport	14	3	11
7	Engineer	14	2	12
