= Chris Jones (basketball, born 1993) =

American-Armenian basketball player (born 1993)

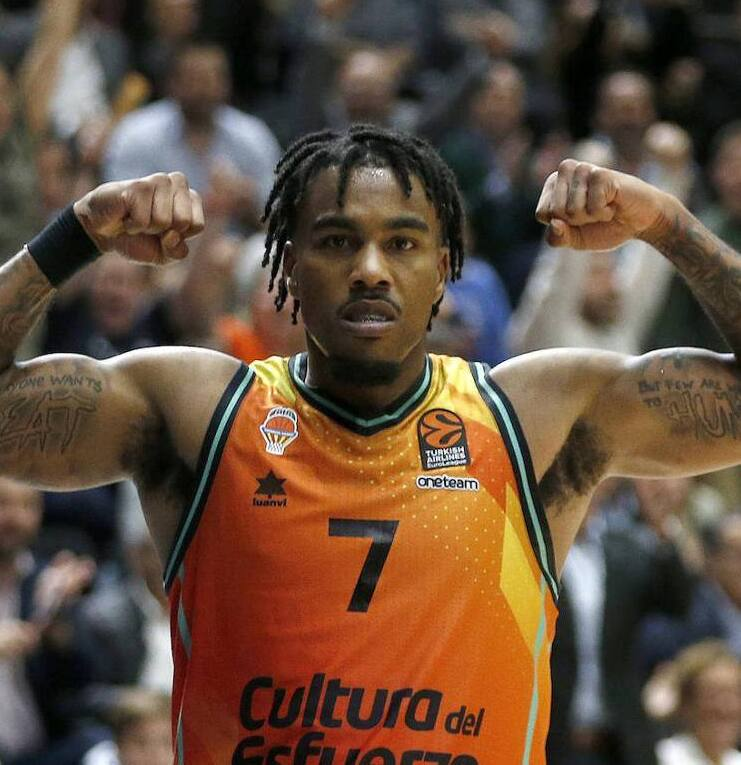
- Jones with Valencia in 2023

No. 1 – Crvena zvezda Meridianbet
- Position: Point guard / Shooting guard
- League: KLS; ABA League; EuroLeague

Personal information
- Born: April 10, 1993 (age 33) Garland, Texas, U.S.
- Listed height: 6 ft 2 in (1.88 m)
- Listed weight: 200 lb (91 kg)

Career information
- High school: Lakeview Centennial (Garland, Texas)
- College: North Texas (2011–2014); Angelo State (2014–2015)
- NBA draft: 2015: undrafted
- Playing career: 2015–present

Career history
- 2015–2016: Tuv Ajmag TuV Urgats
- 2016–2017: Starwings Basel
- 2017–2019: Mons-Hainaut
- 2019–2020: Bursaspor
- 2020–2021: Maccabi Tel Aviv
- 2021–2022: ASVEL
- 2022–2025: Valencia
- 2025–2026: Hapoel Tel Aviv
- 2026–present: Crvena zvezda

Career highlights
- LNB Pro A champion (2022); Israeli League champion (2021); Swiss League MVP (2017); Swiss All-Star (2017); Turkish All-Star (2020); First-team All-Lone Star Conference (2015); Lone Star Conference All-Defensive Team (2015)

Christopher James Jones Jr. (born April 10, 1993) is an American–born naturalized Armenian professional basketball player for Crvena zvezda of the Basketball League of Serbia (KLS), the ABA League, and the EuroLeague. Standing at 6 ft 2 in (1.88 m), he plays at the point guard / shooting guard position. Jones also represents the Armenian national team in international competition.

== High school career ==
Jones attended and played basketball at Lakeview Centennial High School in Garland, Class of 2011. He averaged 16.9 points per game, and was District 10-5A's MVP as a junior and senior. He led the Dallas-Fort Worth area with 6.9 assists per game during his senior season. He was inducted into the Garland Sports Hall of Fame while at Centennial.

== College career ==
Jones played three seasons at the University of North Texas, where he was the school's third all-time steals leader (127), and sixth in career assists (282). As a freshman at UNT, Jones set the freshman record with 4.26 assists per game, and averaged 14.1 points per game which was the 19th-highest nationally among freshmen.

He attended Angelo State University for his senior season, Class of 2015, and averaged 15.3 points per game with 4.7 assists and 2.1 steals. In 2015 Jones was Lone Star Conference All-First Team, Lone Star Conference All-Defensive Team, and National Association of Basketball Coaches All-District South Central First Team.

== Professional career ==
On August 5, 2019, Jones signed with Bursaspor of the Turkish Basketbol Süper Ligi (BSL). He averaged 15.4 points, 3.2 rebounds, 6.8 assists and league-high 1.9 steals in 23 games played.

On August 16, 2020, Jones signed with Maccabi Tel Aviv of the Israeli Basketball Premier League and the EuroLeague. On July 10, 2021, he officially parted ways with the Israeli powerhouse.

On July 20, 2021, Jones signed with ASVEL of the French LNB Pro A and the EuroLeague.

On June 27, 2022, Jones signed a one-year deal with Valencia of the Liga ACB and the EuroLeague. On March 23, 2023, Jones signed a three-year extension with the Spanish club.

On July 20, 2025, he signed with Hapoel Tel Aviv of the Israeli Ligat HaAl.

In 2026, Jones signed with Crvena zvezda of the EuroLeague.

== National team career ==
Jones plays for the Armenia national team. He helped them win the gold medal at the 2022 FIBA European Championship for Small Countries. On July 2, Jones scored 41 points, including 8 three-pointers, and 10 rebounds in the final against Malta. Jones was named the MVP of the tournament and was named to the All-Star Five after averaging 24.5 points, 6.5 rebounds and 7.3 assists.

== Career statistics ==
Legend
GP	Games played	GS	Games started	MPG	Minutes per game
FG%	Field-goal percentage	3P%	3-point field-goal percentage	FT%	Free-throw percentage
RPG	Rebounds per game	APG	Assists per game	SPG	Steals per game
BPG	Blocks per game	PPG	Points per game	PIR	Performance index rating
**Bold**	Career high

=== EuroLeague ===
Year	Team	GP	GS	MPG	FG%	3P%	FT%	RPG	APG	SPG	BPG	PPG	PIR
2020–21	Maccabi	**34**	7	17.5	.478	.362	.750	1.8	2.8	.9	**.1**	7.0	7.5
2021–22	ASVEL	31	31	**27.5**	**.498**	.390	.821	**3.2**	3.6	**1.5**	**.1**	13.1	14.7
2022–23	Valencia	28	25	22.9	.479	.343	**.895**	2.1	**4.3**	1.1	—	**13.4**	**14.8**
2023–24	Valencia	33	**32**	25.8	.470	**.455**	.809	2.1	4.2	1.2	.0	12.7	13.3
Career		126	95	23.3	.481	.392	.832	2.3	3.7	1.2	.0	11.4	12.4

=== EuroCup ===
Year	Team	GP	GS	MPG	FG%	3P%	FT%	RPG	APG	SPG	BPG	PPG	PIR
2024–25	Valencia	15	6	19.6	.500	.362	.857	2.6	4.5	.9	.1	10.6	12.6
Career		15	6	19.6	.500	.362	.857	2.6	4.5	.9	.1	10.6	12.6

=== FIBA Europe Cup ===
Year	Team	GP	GS	MPG	FG%	3P%	FT%	RPG	APG	SPG	BPG	PPG
2018–19	Belfius Mons-Hainaut	8	8	32.5	.561	.333	.692	3.7	5.3	2.2	.3	17.7
Career		8	8	32.5	.561	.333	.692	3.7	5.3	2.2	.3	17.7

=== Domestic leagues ===
Year	Team	League	GP	MPG	FG%	3P%	FT%	RPG	APG	SPG	BPG	PPG
2016–17	(Switzerland) Starwings Basel	SBL	28	36.4	.507	.300	.735	5.6	4.6	2.3	.0	19.8
2017–18	(Belgium) Belfius Mons-Hainaut	PBL	38	28.2	.500	.378	.822	3.7	4.0	1.7	.1	13.9
2018–19	(Belgium) Belfius Mons-Hainaut	PBL	36	28.4	.514	.352	.752	3.9	4.4	1.4	.1	14.4
2019–20	(Turkey) Bursaspor	TBSL	23	34.5	.495	.318	.800	3.2	6.8	1.9	.1	15.3
2020–21	(Israel) Maccabi Tel Aviv	Ligat HaAl	26	23.7	.472	.368	.816	2.6	4.4	1.3	.1	11.8
2021–22	(France) ASVEL	Pro A	42	24.7	.534	.416	.833	2.7	4.1	1.4	.0	13.9
2022–23	(Spain) Valencia	ACB	35	22.1	.491	.383	.845	1.7	4.7	1.1	.0	12.7
2023–24	(Spain) Valencia	ACB	36	23.0	.528	.427	.818	1.8	4.0	1.3	.0	12.0
2024–25	(Spain) Valencia	ACB	32	19.7	.528	.367	.776	2.3	5.1	.5	.0	10.8

== Personal life ==
Jones is a native of Garland, Texas. Jones is the son of Latonya McCoy, and has two siblings, D'merhic and London. He is 6 ft 2 in (188 cm), and weighs 200 pounds (91 kg).
