= Rex Kalamian =

American basketball coach (born 1968)

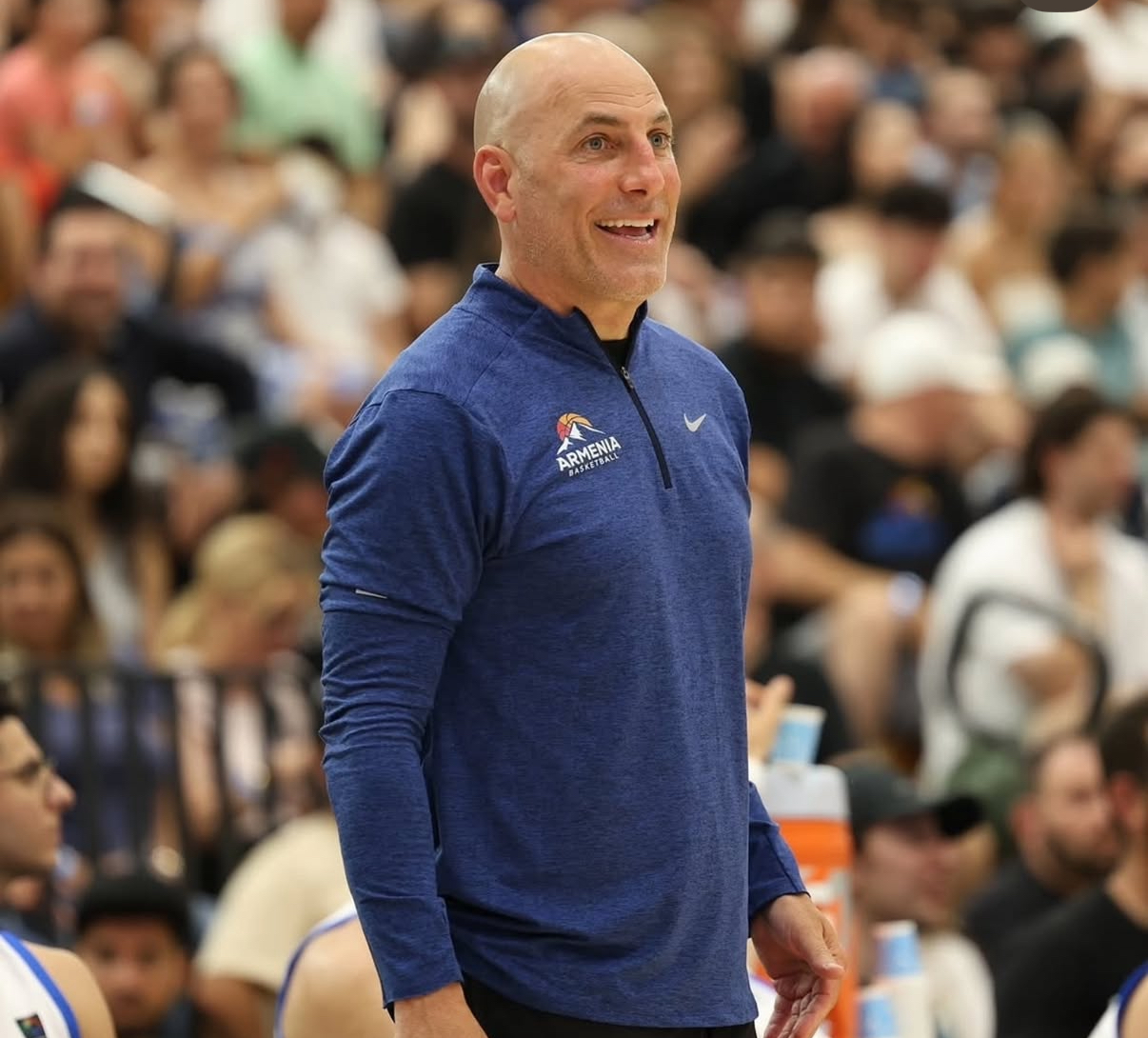
- Kalamian as head coach of the Armenian national basketball team

Chicago Bulls
- Position: Assistant coach
- League: NBA

Personal information
- Born: October 9, 1968 (age 58) Los Angeles, California, U.S.

Career information
- College: ELAC (1987–1989); Cal Poly Pomona (1989–1990)
- Coaching career: 1990–present

Career history

Coaching
- 1990–1992: ELAC (assistant)
- 1995–2003: Los Angeles Clippers (assistant)
- 2004–2005: Denver Nuggets (assistant)
- 2005–2007: Minnesota Timberwolves (assistant)
- 2007–2009: Sacramento Kings (assistant)
- 2009–2015: Oklahoma City Thunder (assistant)
- 2015–2018: Toronto Raptors (assistant)
- 2018–2020: Los Angeles Clippers (assistant)
- 2020–2021: Sacramento Kings (assistant)
- 2021–2023: Detroit Pistons (assistant)
- 2024–2026: Milwaukee Bucks (assistant)
- 2026–present: Chicago Bulls (assistant)

Career highlights
- As an assistant coach: NBA Cup champion (2024)

Rex Kalamian is an American professional basketball coach who is an assistant coach for the Chicago Bulls of the National Basketball Association (NBA). He is also the head coach for the Armenia men's national basketball team. He previously had assistant coaching stints with the Milwaukee Bucks, Los Angeles Clippers, Denver Nuggets, Minnesota Timberwolves, Sacramento Kings, Oklahoma City Thunder, and Toronto Raptors.

== Coaching career ==
=== Early years ===
Kalamian started his coaching career as an assistant for the East Los Angeles College basketball team for two seasons. He spent nine years with the Los Angeles Clippers as an assistant coach and assistant to the scouting team. Kalamian worked as the West Coast scout for the Philadelphia 76ers during the 2003–04 season. He was an assistant and player development coach for the Denver Nuggets during the 2004–05 season. Kalamian then spent two seasons each as an assistant coach for the Minnesota Timberwolves and Sacramento Kings.

=== Oklahoma City Thunder (2009–2015) ===
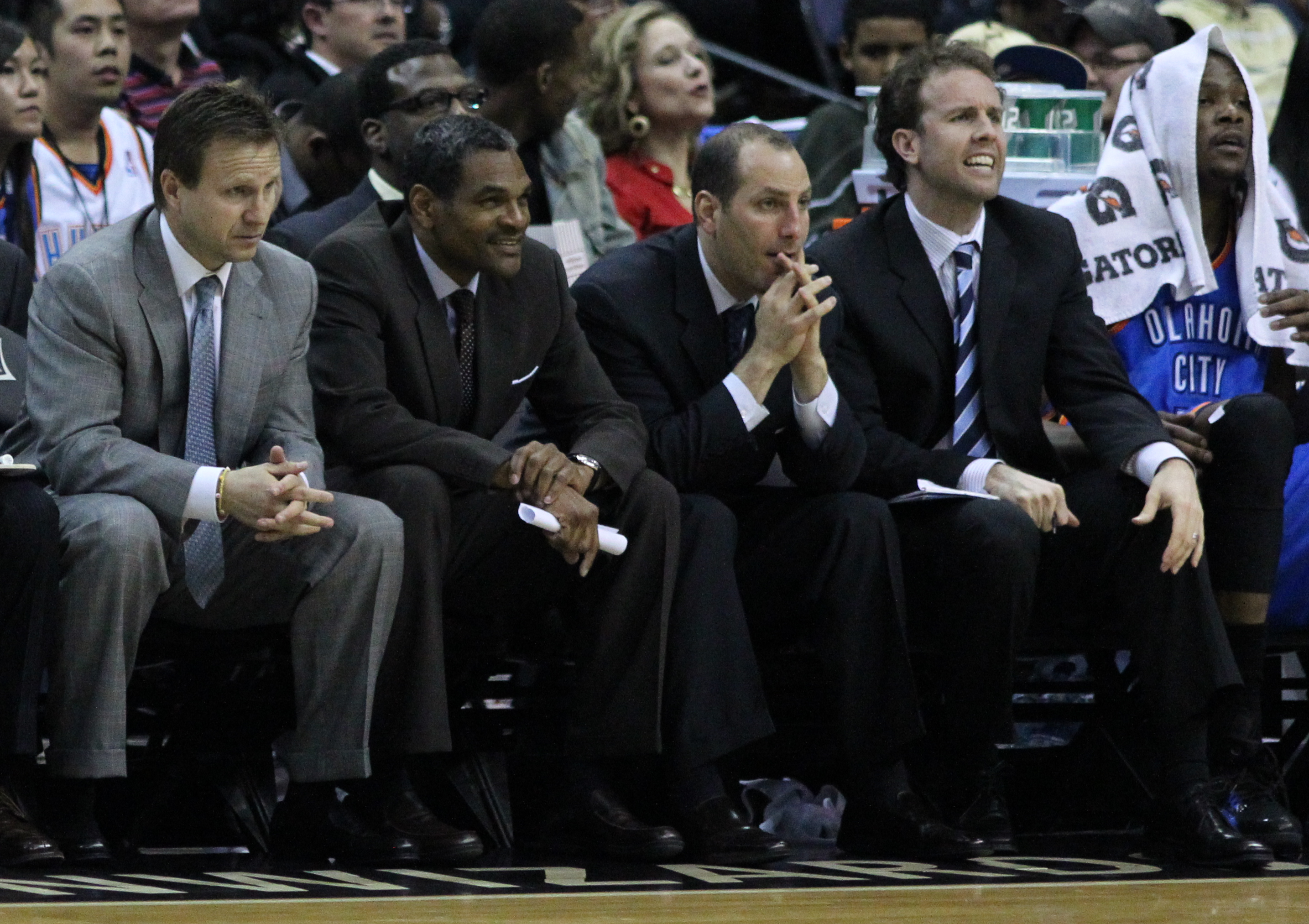
Kalamian (center) sits alongside the Oklahoma City Thunder coaching staff in 2011

On August 14, 2009, Kalamian was hired by the Oklahoma City Thunder as an assistant coach.

=== Toronto Raptors (2015–2018) ===
On June 29, 2015, he was hired to serve as an assistant coach by the Toronto Raptors.

=== Los Angeles Clippers (2018–2020) ===
On August 1, 2018, he was hired to serve as an assistant coach by the Los Angeles Clippers.

=== Sacramento Kings (2020–2021) ===
On November 5, 2020, Kalamian was hired as an assistant coach by the Sacramento Kings.

=== Detroit Pistons (2021–2023) ===
On June 15, 2021, Kalamian was hired as an assistant coach by the Detroit Pistons.

=== Armenian National Team (2022-present) ===
On January 20, 2022, Kalamian agreed to become the new head coach of the Armenian national team.

=== Milwaukee Bucks (2024-2026) ===
On January 26, 2024, Kalamian was reported to be joining Doc Rivers' staff with the Milwaukee Bucks.

=== Chicago Bulls (2026–present) ===
On July 14, 2026, Kalamian was reported to be joining Tiago Splitter's staff with the Chicago Bulls.

== Personal life ==
As a player, he was named team captain at East Los Angeles where he led the South Coast Conference in three-point shooting percentage during the 1988–89 season.

An Armenian-American, Kalamian attended East Los Angeles College, but graduated from Cal Poly Pomona with a bachelor's degree in business management.
