= FIMA Basketball =

FIMA
- Nickname: FIMA Basketball
- League: Armenia Basketball League A
- Founded: 1945; 2017 (re-founded)
- Arena: Mika Sports Arena
- Capacity: 1,250
- Location: Yerevan, Armenia
- Team colors: White, Black
- President: Khachik Harutyunyan
- Head coach: Vahagn Harutyunyan
Home

FIMA Basketball (Armenian: ՖԻՄԱ Բասկետբոլ) or (Armenian: Ֆիզիկուլտուրայի Ինստիտուտի Մարզական Ակումբ Բասկետբոլ; Fizkulturayi instituti marzakan akumb basketbol), meaning Physical-culture Institute Sports Club Basketball, are the professional basketball section of FIMA Yerevan, the sports club that represents the Armenian State Institute of Physical Culture and Sport.

== History ==
Despite a financial crisis in the club, the basketball section joined the Armenia Basketball League A as one of its seven founders.

After finishing in the third place at the end of the regular season of the league's inaugural season, FIMA advanced to the semifinals of the competition.

== Season by season ==
Season	Tier	Division	Pos.
2017–18	1	League A	4th
2018–19	1	League A	5th

== Administration and technical staff ==
Club president	(Armenia) Khachik Harutyunyan
General manager	(Armenia) Gayane Apresyan
Head coach	(Armenia) Drastamat Muradyan
Assistant coach	(Armenia) Albert Harutyunyan
Assistant coach	(Armenia) Ara Stepanyan
