= BC Grand Sport =

Professional basketball team

- League: Armenia Basketball League A
- Founded: 2011
- Arena: Grand Sport Basketball Complex
- Location: Yerevan, Armenia
- Team colors: Red, White, Blue
- Head coach: (Armenia) Nerses Manucharyan
- Website: Official website
Home	Away

BC Grand Sport is a professional basketball team based in Yerevan, Armenia. Founded in 2011 by Grand Holding Co. Ltd., it currently plays in the Armenia Basketball League A.

== History ==
Alternative logo of the basketball section.

BC Grand Sport was founded in 2011, when the new Grand Sport basketball complex opened in Yerevan, Armenia. The team started training and ultimately playing in junior categories from 2011, until it made its debut in the Armenia Basketball League A in 2017.

In its first season, the club ended in the sixth position out of seven teams at the League A. Vardan Khachatryan served as a player-manager during the first half of the season, before the appointment of Nerses Manucharyan as the head coach of the team prior to the beginning of the second half.

In September 2018, Grand Sport resigned to continue in the League A as they wanted to develop their youth teams instead of signing foreign players for their squad, and joined the newly created League B.

== Home ground ==
The team currently plays in its home arena, the Grand Sport Basketball Complex, located in Yerevan, Armenia. Due to being one of the newest arenas and of highest quality in Yerevan, many other matches take place here as well, such as the Pan-Armenian Games.

== Season by season ==
Season	Tier	Division	Pos.
2017–18	1	League A	6th
2018–19	2	League B	
