= Gibraltar men's national basketball team =

Gibraltar
- FIBA ranking: 114 ▲11 (13 July 2026)
- Joined FIBA: 1985
- FIBA zone: FIBA Europe
- National federation: Gibraltar Amateur Basketball Association
- Coach: Adam Cassaglia

Championship for Small Countries
- Appearances: 20
- Medals: (bronze) Bronze: (2026)

Island Games
- Appearances: 9
- Medals: (silver) Silver: (2017); (bronze) Bronze: (2001, 2015, 2019)
Home	Away

First international
- Ireland 114–59 Gibraltar (Ta'Qali, Malta; 14 December 1988)

Biggest win
- Gibraltar 102–51 Isle of Man (Visby, Sweden; 27 June 2017)

Biggest defeat
- Ireland 112–39 Gibraltar (Cardiff, Wales; 12 December 1990)

The Gibraltar men's national basketball team is the representative for the British overseas territory of Gibraltar in international basketball. The team is selected by the Gibraltar Amateur Basketball Association (GABBA) which is a member of FIBA Europe since 1985. The team competes at the European Championship for Small Countries, and in the Island Games.

== Competitive record ==
=== Championship for Small Countries ===
Championship for Small Countries
Year	Position	Pld	W	L
(Malta) 1988	7th	5	1	4
(Wales) 1990	5th	5	2	3
(Cyprus) 1992	7th	5	1	4
(Republic of Ireland) 1994	7th	5	2	3
(San Marino) 1996	8th	5	1	4
(Gibraltar) 1998	4th	4	1	3
(Andorra) 2000	6th	5	0	5
(Malta) 2002	8th	5	0	5
(Andorra) 2004	7th	4	1	3
(Albania) 2006	7th	5	1	4
(Scotland) 2008	6th	5	1	4
(Malta) 2010	7th	5	2	3
(San Marino) 2012	7th	4	0	4
(Gibraltar) 2014	6th	4	0	4
(Moldova) 2016	8th	5	0	5
(San Marino) 2018	4th	5	2	3
(Republic of Ireland) 2021	5th	4	0	4
(Malta) 2022	6th	4	0	4
(Andorra) 2024	4th	5	2	3
(Gibraltar) 2026	3rd place, bronze medalist(s)	5	2	3
Total		94	19	75

=== Island Games ===
Island Games
Year	Position	Pld	W	L
(Gotland) 1999	4th	4	2	2
(Isle of Man) 2001	3rd place, bronze medalist(s)	6	4	2
(Guernsey) 2003	6th	5	3	2
(Rhodes) 2007	7th	6	3	3
(Åland) 2009	6th	4	1	3
(Isle of Wight) 2011	4th	5	2	3
(Jersey) 2015	3rd place, bronze medalist(s)	4	3	1
(Gotland) 2017	2nd place, silver medalist(s)	5	4	1
(Gibraltar) 2019	3rd place, bronze medalist(s)	5	4	1
Total		44	26	18

== Team ==
=== Current roster ===
Roster for the 2026 FIBA European Championship for Small Countries.

Gibraltar men's national basketball team roster
Players
Coaches

Pos.	No.	Name	Age – Date of birth	Height	Club	Ctr.
F	4	Alejandro Garcia Tejon	25 – 2 February 2001	1.98 m (6 ft 6 in)	Unión Linense Baloncesto	(Spain)
C	5	Callum Culross	35 – 11 September 1990	1.96 m (6 ft 5 in)	Valmar Harlem	(Gibraltar)
G	7	Jamie McGrail	22 – 26 November 2003	1.83 m (6 ft 0 in)	Valmar Harlem	(Gibraltar)
F	8	Callum Jon Vinales	22 – 11 September 2003	1.87 m (6 ft 2 in)	Lincoln Bayside	(Gibraltar)
G	10	Andrew Yeats	34 – 22 January 1992	1.85 m (6 ft 1 in)	Unión Linense Baloncesto	(Spain)
C	11	Mohamed El Yettefti	25 – 12 February 2001	1.99 m (6 ft 6 in)	Valmar Harlem	(Gibraltar)
G	12	Thomas Yome	29 – 16 December 1996	1.86 m (6 ft 1 in)	Unión Linense Baloncesto	(Spain)
F	18	Javier Felice	17 – 13 December 2008	1.98 m (6 ft 6 in)	GABBA	(Gibraltar)
G	23	Michael Rodriguez	26 – 18 March 2000	1.82 m (6 ft 0 in)	Unión Linense Baloncesto	(Spain)
F	26	Louis Dalmedo	20 – 18 February 2006	1.93 m (6 ft 4 in)	Bavaria Blue Stars	(Gibraltar)
G	42	Ian Yeats	27 – 1 October 1998	1.82 m (6 ft 0 in)	Valmar Harlem	(Gibraltar)
F	71	Dylan Gomez	36 – 3 October 1989	1.92 m (6 ft 4 in)	Unión Linense Baloncesto	(Spain)

Head coach

- (Gibraltar) Stuart Felice

Assistant coach(es)

- (Spain) Raul Garcia Fernandez

Legend

- (C) Team captain
- Club – describes last
  club before the competition
- Age – describes age
  on 28 June 2026

== Kit ==
=== Manufacturer ===
2016: Spalding

=== Sponsor ===
2016: odobo

== See also ==
- Sport in Gibraltar
- Gibraltar women's national basketball team
- Gibraltar men's national under-18 basketball team
- Gibraltar men's national under-16 basketball team
