= Shirak SC Basketball =

Shirak SC
- League: Armenia Basketball League A
- Founded: 2017
- Arena: Aram Sargsyan Sports Hall, Gyumri
- Capacity: 350
- Location: Gyumri, Armenia
- Team colors: Orange, black
- President: (Armenia) Arman Sahakyan
- Head coach: (Armenia) Artak Harutyunyan
- Website: http://www.fcshirak.am/
Home	Away

Shirak SC Basketball is the professional basketball section of Shirak SC, a football club based in Gyumri, Armenia. Founded in 2017, it currently plays in the Armenia Basketball League A.

== History ==
Shirak created the basketball section on 19 September 2017, thus becoming one of the seven founder clubs of the new Armenia Basketball League A. The team finished in the fifth position after their debut season.

In September 2018, Shirak resigned to continue playing in the League A and joined the League B.

== Season by season ==
Season	Tier	Division	Pos.
2017–18	1	League A	5th

== Administration and technical staff ==
Club president	(Armenia) Arman Sahakyan
Sporting director	(Armenia) Ararat Harutyunyan
Head coach	(Armenia) Artak Harutyunyan
Assistant coach	(Armenia) Arman Tirayan
Assistant coach	(Armenia) Anna Tadevosyan
