= Urartu BC =

Urartu Vivaro
- Nickname: Արաբկիրի հին խաղացողները (Arabkir's old players)
- League: Armenia Basketball League A
- Founded: 2016
- Arena: Armenia Sports Arena
- Capacity: 950
- Location: Yerevan, Armenia
- Team colors: Yellow, Purple
- President: Karen Giloyan
- Head coach: Mikael Pogosian
- Championships: 1 Armenian SuperCup
Home

Urartu Basketball Club (Armenian: Ուրարտու բասկետբոլային ակումբ), also currently known as Urartu Vivaro for sponsorship reasons, is a professional basketball team in Armenia, currently based in Yerevan. Founded in 2016 in Yerevan. The team is a founding member of the Armenia Basketball League A.

== History ==
Urartu was founded in 2016 with the players who participated for national team in the European Championship for Small Countries played just months before. In its debut first season, the club joined the Russian Basketball Super League, but after nine rounds the team resigned to continue playing due to financial difficulties.

In 2017, the team joined the newly created Armenia Basketball League A, becoming one of the seven clubs that played the first season. Despite finishing the regular season with a perfect balance of 12 wins in 12 games, Urartu was eliminated in the semifinals by Artsakh.

Ara Poghosyan was the first president of the club who chaired between 2016 and 2017, followed by Karen Giloyan. Tigran Gyokchyan managed the team during the same period until late 2017 when he was replaced by Sargis Stepanyan.

== Season by season ==
| Season | Tier | Division | Pos. |
|---|---|---|---|
| 2017–18 | 1 | League A | 3rd |
| 2018–19 | 1 | League A | 2nd |

== Current roster ==
Note: Flags indicate national team eligibility at FIBA-sanctioned events. Players may hold other non-FIBA nationalities not displayed.

Urartu BC roster
Players
Coaches

| Pos. | No. | Nat. | Name | Ht. | Wt. | Age |
|---|---|---|---|---|---|---|
| SG | 6 | (Armenia) | Danielyan, Arman | 1.85 m (6 ft 1 in) | 94 kg (207 lb) | 27 – 21 July 1999 |
| C | 11 | (Armenia) | Podkolzin, Georgii | 2.01 m (6 ft 7 in) | | 27 – 27 May 1999 |
| G | 25 | (United States) | MClain, Akil | 1.88 m (6 ft 2 in) | | 28 – 8 December 1997 |
| G | 23 | (United States) | Johnson, David | 1.85 m (6 ft 1 in) | | 28 – 4 November 1997 |
| PG | 12 | (Armenia) | Vardanyan, Mkhitar | 1.80 m (5 ft 11 in) | | 32 – 3 April 1994 |
| PG | | (Armenia) | Gasparyan, Babken |
| PG | 8 | (United States) | Nouchanthavong, Jose | 1.87 m (6 ft 2 in) | | 34 – 21 February 1992 |
| F | | (United States) | White, DeWan | 1.95 m (6 ft 5 in) | | 29 – 4 July 1997 |
| F | | (Armenia) | Khachatryan, Karapet |
| G | | (Armenia) | Khachatryan, Gevorg |

Head coach

- (Armenia) Mikael Pogosian

Assistant coach(es)

- (Armenia) Arayik Poghosyan

Legend

- (C) Team captain
- Injured

- Roster
Updated: December 23, 2021

== Notable players ==
- (United States) Arizona Reid

== Trophies ==
- Armenian SuperCup (1): 2019
