= 2013–14 Euroleague Quarterfinals =

Results for the Quarterfinals of the 2013–14 Euroleague basketball tournament.

The quarterfinals were played in April, 2014. Team #1 (i.e., the group winner in each series) hosted Games 1 and 2, plus Game 5 if necessary. Team #2 hosted Game 3, plus Game 4 if necessary.

Some times given below are in Central European Time, and some others in Eastern European Time

== Quarterfinals ==
Team 1 hosted Games 1 and 2, plus Game 5 if necessary. Team 2 hosted Game 3, and Game 4 if necessary.

Team 1	Agg.	Team 2	1st leg	2nd leg	3rd leg	4th leg	5th leg
FC Barcelona (Spain)	3–0	(Turkey) Galatasaray	88–61	84–63	78–75		
Real Madrid (Spain)	3–2	(Greece) Olympiacos	88–71	82–77	76–78	62–71	83–69
CSKA Moscow (Russia)	3–2	(Greece) Panathinaikos	77–74	77–51	59–65	72–73	74–44
EA7 Milano (Italy)	1–3	(Israel) Maccabi Tel Aviv	99–101	91–77	63–75	66–86	

== Game 1 ==
15 April 2014
19:00

Boxscore

FC Barcelona (Spain)	88–61	(Turkey) Galatasaray Liv Hospital
Scoring by quarter: 14–21, 19–14, 26–14, 29–12
Pts: Nachbar 19; Rebs: Dorsey 11; Asts: Tomić 6		Pts: Arroyo 14; Rebs: Aldemir 7 Asts: Güler, Arroyo 2

Palau Blaugrana, Barcelona
Attendance: 5,227
Referees: Christos Christodoulou (GRE), Jakub Zamojski (POL), Elias Koromilas (GRE)

15 April 2014
21:00

Boxscore

Real Madrid (Spain)	88–71	(Greece) Olympiacos
Scoring by quarter: 27–12, 21–29, 22–15, 18–15
Pts: Fernández 20; Rebs: Bourousis 7 Asts: Fernández 5		Pts: Spanoulis 18; Rebs: Simmons 7 Asts: Spanoulis 5

Palacio de Deportes, Madrid
Attendance: 10,152
Referees: Ilija Belosevic (SRB), Borys Ryzhyk (UKR), Olegs Latisevs (LAT)

16 April 2014
18:00

Boxscore

CSKA Moscow (Russia)	77–74 (OT)	(Greece) Panathinaikos
Scoring by quarter: 21–14, 19–19, 18–23, 14-16, Overtime: 5-2
Pts: Weems 21; Rebs: Khryapa 11; Asts: Weems 5		Pts: Mačiulis, Lasme 14; Rebs: Mačiulis 5 Asts: Diamantidis 7

Universal Sports Hall, Moscow
Attendance: 4,509
Referees: Jose Ramon Garcia Ortiz (ESP), Sreten Radovic (CRO), Matej Boltauzer (SLO)

16 April 2014
20:45

Boxscore

Emporio Armani Milano (Italy)	99–101 (OT)	(Israel) Maccabi Tel Aviv
Scoring by quarter: 23–19, 24–23, 23–16, 17–29, Overtime: 12–14
Pts: Langford 18; Rebs: Samuels 7 Asts: Hackett 6		Pts: Hickman 26; Rebs: Hickman 4 Asts: Hickman, Rice 3

Mediolanum Forum, Milan
Attendance: 12,331
Referees: Dani Hierrezuelo (ESP), Spiros Gkontas (GRE), Antonio Conde (ESP)

== Game 2 ==
17 April 2014
19:00

Boxscore

Real Madrid (Spain)	82–77	(Greece) Olympiacos
Scoring by quarter: 30–23, 23–21, 17–18, 12–15
Pts: Bourousis 19; Rebs: Bourousis 10; Asts: Llull 7		Pts: Spanoulis 18; Rebs: Dunston 9 Asts: Lojeski, Mantzaris 4

Palacio de Deportes, Madrid
Attendance: 10,753
Referees: Guerrino Cerebuch (ITA), Tolga Sahin (ITA), Sasa Maricic (SRB)

17 April 2014
21:00

Boxscore

FC Barcelona (Spain)	84–63	(Turkey) Galatasaray Liv Hospital
Scoring by quarter: 21–8, 22–17, 18–16, 23–22
Pts: Oleson 14; Rebs: Tomic 8 Asts: Huertas 6		Pts: Domercant 11; Rebs: Aldemir 7 Asts: Arslan 7

Palau Blaugrana, Barcelona
Attendance: 5,573
Referees: Robert Lottermoser (GER), Milivoje Jovicic (SRB), Marcin Kowalski (POL)

18 April 2014
18:15

Boxscore

CSKA Moscow (Russia)	77–51	(Greece) Panathinaikos
Scoring by quarter: 21–19, 18–6, 11–14, 27–12
Pts: Weems 23; Rebs: Khryapa 11; Asts: Khryapa 7		Pts: Ukić 15; Rebs: Fotsis, Mačiulis 4 Asts: Diamantidis, Ukić 2

Universal Sports Hall, Moscow
Attendance: 4,843
Referees: Sasa Pukl (SLO), Miguel Perez Perez (ESP), Emilio Perez Pizarro (ESP)

18 April 2014
20:45

Boxscore

Emporio Armani Milano (Italy)	91–77	(Israel) Maccabi Tel Aviv
Scoring by quarter: 25–17, 22–17, 19–21, 25–22
Pts: Jerrells 17; Rebs: Lawal, Wallace 6 Asts: Hackett 9		Pts: Tyus 16; Rebs: Smith 6 Asts: Hickman, Rice 4

Mediolanum Forum, Milan
Attendance: 12,331
Referees: José Martín (ESP), Recep Ankarali (TUR), Fernando Rocha (POR)

== Game 3 ==
20 April 2014
19:00

Boxscore

Galatasaray Liv Hospital (Turkey)	75–78	(Spain) FC Barcelona
Scoring by quarter: 23–15, 17–20, 12–18, 23–25
Pts: Arroyo 21; Rebs: Hairston 7 Asts: Arroyo 4		Pts: Huertas 16; Rebs: Tomić 6 Asts: Papanikolaou 3

Abdi İpekçi Arena, Istanbul
Attendance: 11,470
Referees: Guerrino Cerebuch (ITA), Borys Ryzhyk (UKR), Panagiotis Anastopoulos (GRE)

21 April 2014
19:00

Boxscore

Olympiacos (Greece)	78–76	(Spain) Real Madrid
Scoring by quarter: 23–15, 22–23, 20–20, 13–18
Pts: Dunston 21; Rebs: Dunston 9 Asts: three players 4		Pts: Rodríguez 19; Rebs: Bourousis, Mirotić 5 Asts: Rodríguez 4

Peace and Friendship Stadium, Piraeus
Attendance: 11,500
Referees: Luigi Lamonica (ITA), Sasa Pukl (SLO), Recep Ankarali (TUR)

21 April 2014
20:15

Boxscore

Maccabi Tel Aviv (Israel)	75–63	(Italy) Emporio Armani Milano
Scoring by quarter: 15–16, 24–13, 22–16, 14–18
Pts: Blu 16; Rebs: Tyus 8 Asts: Hickman 6		Pts: Hackett 14; Rebs: Hackett 6 Asts: Langford 4

Nokia Arena, Tel Aviv
Attendance: 10,728
Referees: Christos Christodoulou (GRE), Milivoje Jovcic (SRB), Robert Lottermoser (GER)

21 April 2014
20:45

Boxscore

Panathinaikos (Greece)	65–59	(Russia) CSKA Moscow
Scoring by quarter: 20–11, 21–24, 10–12, 14–12
Pts: Lasme 13; Rebs: Wright 8 Asts: Diamantidis 5		Pts: Weems 14; Rebs: Vorontsevich 6 Asts: Khryapa 8

O.A.C.A., Athens
Attendance: 14,000
Referees: Ilija Belosevic (SRB), Fernando Rocha (POR), Antonio Conde (ESP)

== Game 4 ==
23 April 2014
18:30

Boxscore

Panathinaikos (Greece)	73–72 (OT)	(Russia) CSKA Moscow
Scoring by quarter: 21–16, 16–22, 14–10, 13–16, Overtime: 9–8
Pts: Mačiulis 15; Rebs: Mačiulis, Lasme 5 Asts: Diamantidis 6		Pts: Micov 15; Rebs: Kaun 6 Asts: Khryapa 4

O.A.C.A., Athens
Attendance: 14,750
Referees: Dani Hierrezuelo (ESP), Tolga Sahin (ITA), Olegs Latisevs (LAT)

23 April 2014
19:45

Boxscore

Maccabi Tel Aviv (Israel)	86–66	(Italy) Emporio Armani Milano
Scoring by quarter: 19–21, 16–22, 19–13, 32–10
Pts: Tyus 16; Rebs: Smith, Tyus 9 Asts: Rice 6		Pts: Langford 28; Rebs: Hackett 6 Asts: Hackett, Moss 4

Nokia Arena, Tel Aviv
Attendance: 10,728
Referees: Sasa Pukl (SLO), Borys Ryzhyk (UKR), Sreten Radovic (CRO)

23 April 2014
20:45

Boxscore

Olympiacos (Greece)	71–62	(Spain) Real Madrid
Scoring by quarter: 15–16, 22–14, 12–17, 22–15
Pts: Dunston 21; Rebs: Dunston 9 Asts: Spanoulis 7		Pts: Fernandez 18; Rebs: Fernandez 8 Asts: Llull 5

Peace and Friendship Stadium, Piraeus
Attendance: 11,500
Referees: Milivoje Jovcic (SRB), Robert Lottermoser (GER), Jakub Zamojski (POL)

== Game 5 ==
25 April 2014
18:00

Boxscore

CSKA Moscow (Russia)	74–44	(Greece) Panathinaikos
Scoring by quarter: 18–10, 17–11, 19–12, 20–11
Pts: Kaun 18; Rebs: Kaun 9 Asts: Khryapa, Weems 5		Pts: Gist 11; Rebs: Mavrokefalidis 6 Asts: Diamantidis 4

Universal Sports Hall, Moscow
Attendance: 4,896
Referees: Milivoje Jovcic (SRB), Borys Ryzhyk (UKR), Robert Lottermoser (GER)

25 April 2014
20:45

Boxscore

Real Madrid (Spain)	83–69	(Greece) Olympiacos
Scoring by quarter: 18–12, 22–22, 19–18, 24–17
Pts: Llull 20; Rebs: Reyes 8 Asts: Llull, Rodríguez 4		Pts: Spanoulis 19; Rebs: Lojeski 6 Asts: Spanoulis 7

Palacio de Deportes, Madrid
Attendance: 12,698
Referees: Luigi Lamonica (ITA), Fernando Rocha (POR), Milija Vojinovic (SRB)
