= Aragats BT =

Aragats
- League: Armenia Basketball League A
- Founded: 2018
- Arena: Mika Sports Arena
- Capacity: 1,200
- Location: Yerevan, Armenia
- Team colors: Red, Blue
- President: Tony Jountoyan
- Head coach: Tigran Gyokchyan
- Championships: 1 Armenian League
Home

Aragats Basketball Team, is a professional basketball team based in Yerevan, Armenia. It currently plays in the Armenia Basketball League A.

== History ==
Aragats was founded in 2018 for playing the Armenia Basketball League A. In its first season, the club won the league.

== Season by season ==
Season	Tier	Division	Pos.
2018–19	1	League A	1st
