= Chris Mitchell =

Chris Mitchell may refer to:

- Chris Mitchell (journalist), Australian journalist
- Chris Mitchell (Australian footballer) (1947–2022), Australian rules footballer
- Chris Mitchell (Scottish footballer) (1988–2016), Scottish footballer

== See also ==
- Christian Mitchell (born 1980s), American politician in Illinois
- Christopher Mitchell (disambiguation)
