= 2012 FIBA European Championship for Small Countries =

Tournament details
- Host country: San Marino
- City: Serravalle
- Dates: 2–7 July 2012
- Teams: 7 (from 1 confederation)
- Venue(s): 1 (in 1 host city)

Final positions
- Champions: Andorra (4th title)
- Runners-up: Moldova
- Third place: Malta

Official website
- www.fibaeurope.com

The 2012 FIBA European Championship for Small Countries was the 13th edition of the tournament, formerly known as the Promotion Cup or the FIBA EuroBasket Division C. It was played in Serravalle, San Marino, from 2 to 7 July 2012.

The draw took place on 4 December 2011, in Freising, Germany. The Andorra national team were the winners of the Championship.

== Participating teams ==
- Andorra
- Gibraltar
- Malta
- Moldova
- San Marino
- Scotland
- Wales

== First round ==
=== Group A ===
Pos	Team	Pld	W	L	PF	PA	PD	Pts	Qualification
1	Andorra	2	2	0	196	131	+65	4	Semifinals
2	Moldova	2	1	1	165	162	+3	3	Semifinals
3	Gibraltar	2	0	2	109	177	−68	2	5th–7th place classification

Source: FIBA

2 July 2012
14:15

Boxscore

Moldova	81–62	Gibraltar
Scoring by quarter: 18–9, 20–17, 23–23, 20–13

Arena Domus, Serravalle, San Marino
Attendance: 100

3 July 2012
15:00

Boxscore

Gibraltar	47–96	Andorra
Scoring by quarter: 15–23, 13–19, 8–24, 11–30

Arena Domus, Serravalle, San Marino
Attendance: 100

4 July 2012
15:00

Boxscore

Andorra	100–84	Moldova
Scoring by quarter: 27–20, 21–24, 22–15, 16–19

Arena Domus, Serravalle, San Marino
Attendance: 50

=== Group B ===
Pos	Team	Pld	W	L	PF	PA	PD	Pts	Qualification
1	San Marino	3	2	1	197	193	+4	5	Semifinals
2	Malta	3	2	1	225	186	+39	5	Semifinals
3	Wales	3	1	2	180	214	−34	4	5th–7th place classification
4	Scotland	3	1	2	210	219	−9	4	5th–7th place classification

Source: FIBA

2 July 2012
16:30

Boxscore

Malta	75–64	Scotland
Scoring by quarter: 24–14, 15–9, 17–23, 19–18

Arena Domus, Serravalle, San Marino
Attendance: 100

2 July 2012
19:30

Boxscore

San Marino	58–53	Wales
Scoring by quarter: 14–15, 11–14, 21–10, 12–14

Arena Domus, Serravalle, San Marino
Attendance: 500

3 July 2012
17:15

Boxscore

Wales	51–81	Malta
Scoring by quarter: 14–25, 7–25, 12–20, 18–11

Arena Domus, Serravalle, San Marino
Attendance: 100

3 July 2012
19:30

Boxscore

Scotland	71–68	San Marino
Scoring by quarter: 20–18, 12–15, 18–17, 21–18

Arena Domus, Serravalle, San Marino
Attendance: 450

4 July 2012
17:15

Boxscore

Scotland	75–76	Wales
Scoring by quarter: 16–19, 23–18, 20–23, 16–16

Arena Domus, Serravalle, San Marino
Attendance: 100

4 July 2012
19:30

Boxscore

San Marino	71–69	Malta
Scoring by quarter: 12–13, 21–21, 15–22, 23–13

Arena Domus, Serravalle, San Marino
Attendance: 850

== 5th–7th place classification ==
Pos	Team	Pld	W	L	PF	PA	PD	Pts
5	Wales	2	2	0	171	147	+24	4
6	Scotland	2	1	1	159	136	+23	3
7	Gibraltar	2	0	2	132	179	−47	2

Source: FIBA

The game of the first round between the 3rd and 4th qualified of group B is included in this round.

6 July 2012
15:00

Boxscore

Gibraltar	72–95	Wales
Scoring by quarter: 20–18, 18–28, 20–19, 14–30

Arena Domus, Serravalle, San Marino
Attendance: 50

7 July 2012
10:30

Boxscore

Scotland	84–60	Gibraltar
Scoring by quarter: 21–12, 15–13, 20–14, 28–21

Arena Domus, Serravalle, San Marino
Attendance: 50

== Knockout stage ==
Semifinals
Andorra	75
Malta	65
San Marino	63
Moldova	88

Final
Andorra	74
Moldova	72
Bronze medal game
Malta	96
San Marino	57

=== Semifinals ===
6 July 2012
17:15

Boxscore

Andorra	75–65	Malta
Scoring by quarter: 12–23, 21–18, 19–15, 23–9
Pts: Galera 21; Rebs: four players 5 Asts: Fernández 7		Pts: Jackson 25; Rebs: Deguara 17; Asts: Schembri 6

Arena Domus, Serravalle, San Marino
Attendance: 100

6 July 2012
19:30

Boxscore

San Marino	63–88	Moldova
Scoring by quarter: 14–24, 14–15, 17–23, 18–26
Pts: A. Raschi 23; Rebs: A. Raschi 13; Asts: Zanotti 2		Pts: Cropotov 22; Rebs: Coputerco 13; Asts: Coputerco 10

Arena Domus, Serravalle, San Marino
Attendance: 400

=== Bronze medal game ===
7 July 2012
15:00

Boxscore

Malta	96–57	San Marino
Scoring by quarter: 28–13, 15–13, 27–15, 26–16

Arena Domus, Serravalle, San Marino
Attendance: 200

=== Final ===
7 July 2012
17:15

Boxscore

Andorra	74–72	Moldova
Scoring by quarter: 17–16, 15–11, 26–18, 16–27
Pts: three players 16; Rebs: Fernández, Olcina 6 Asts: Galera 5		Pts: Cropotov 18; Rebs: Priscepnii 13; Asts: Coputerco 3

Arena Domus, Serravalle, San Marino
Attendance: 250

== Final standings ==
Rank	Team
1st place, gold medalist(s)	Andorra
2nd place, silver medalist(s)	Moldova
3rd place, bronze medalist(s)	Malta
4	San Marino
5	Wales
6	Scotland
7	Gibraltar
