= Moldova men's national basketball team =

Men's national basketball team representing Moldova

Moldova
- FIBA ranking: 152 ▼1 (3 March 2026)
- Joined FIBA: 1992
- FIBA zone: FIBA Europe
- National federation: Basketball Federation of Moldova
- Coach: Vacant

FIBA World Cup
- Appearances: None

EuroBasket
- Appearances: None

Championship for Small Countries
- Appearances: 7
- Medals: (silver) Silver: (2008, 2012)
Home	Away

First international
- Latvia 110–64 Moldova (Wrocław, Poland; 30 May 1993)

Biggest win
- Moldova 100–54 Gibraltar (Durrës, Albania; 29 May 2006)

Biggest defeat
- Czech Republic 126–69 Moldova (Wrocław, Poland; 31 May 1993)

The Moldova men's national basketball team (Romanian: Echipa națională de baschet a Moldovei, Russian: Сборная Молдовы по баскетболу) represents Moldova in international basketball. The team is governed by the Basketball Federation of Moldova.

In the past, Moldova has mostly competed in smaller competitions such as the European Championship for Small Countries, where they won silver medals in 2008 and 2012.

== History ==
The Basketball Federation of Moldova was founded in 1991, after gaining independence from the Soviet Union. In 1992, Moldova became members of FIBA, with the national team playing in their first international match against Latvia a year later. A qualifier for the 1993 EuroBasket, in which they would lose 110–64.

Throughout the rest of the 1990s, Moldova wouldn't take part in any tournament until 2002, when the team entered the 2002 European Championship for Small Countries. Moldova went on to place fifth overall in the competition which featured eight teams. In 2006, Moldova entered the tournament for the second time, making it to the semi-finals before losing to Azerbaijan. After the loss, the team was relegated to the bronze medal match where they would fall once again, this time to Andorra.

Two years later, at the 2008 tournament, Moldova made it back to the semi-finals after going undefeated (3–0) in the group stage for the second consecutive tournament. This time, Moldova would prove too much for Andorra in an 85–74 victory to reach the final. There, the team would lose in a tightly contested match to Azerbaijan 78–80 to come away with the silver medal. For Moldova's next four appearances at the tournament, their best result would be another silver medal finish at the 2012 competition.

== Competitive record ==
=== FIBA World Cup ===
World Cup					Qualification		
Year	Position	Pld	W	L	Pld	W	L
1950 to 1990	Part of Soviet Union						
(Canada) 1994	Did not qualify				Did not qualify		
(Greece) 1998	Did not enter				Did not enter		
(United States) 2002	Did not enter				Did not enter		
(Japan) 2006	Did not enter				Did not enter		
(Turkey) 2010	Did not enter				Did not enter		
(Spain) 2014	Did not enter				Did not enter		
(China) 2019	Did not enter				Did not enter		
(Philippines) (Japan) (Indonesia) 2023	Did not enter				Did not enter		
(Qatar) 2027	Did not enter				Did not enter		
(France) 2031	To be determined				To be determined		
Total	0/9						

=== Championship for Small Countries ===
FIBA European Championship for Small Countries
Year	Position	Pld	W	L
(Malta) 2002	5th	5	4	1
(Albania) 2006	4th	5	3	2
(Scotland) 2008	2nd place, silver medalist(s)	5	4	1
(Malta) 2010	4th	5	1	4
(San Marino) 2012	2nd place, silver medalist(s)	4	2	2
(Moldova) 2016	5th	5	3	2
(San Marino) 2018	7th	5	0	5
Total		34	17	17

=== EuroBasket ===
EuroBasket					Qualification		
Year	Position	Pld	W	L	Pld	W	L
1935 to 1939	Part of Romania						
1947 to 1991	Part of Soviet Union						
(Germany) 1993	Did not qualify				3	0	3
(Greece) 1995	Did not enter				Did not enter		
(Spain) 1997	Did not enter				Did not enter		
(France) 1999	Did not enter				Did not enter		
(Turkey) 2001	Did not enter				Did not enter		
(Sweden) 2003	Did not enter				Did not enter		
(Serbia and Montenegro) 2005	Did not enter				Did not enter		
(Spain) 2007	Did not enter				Did not enter		
(Poland) 2009	Did not enter				Did not enter		
(Lithuania) 2011	Did not enter				Did not enter		
(Slovenia) 2013	Did not enter				Did not enter		
(France) (Croatia) (Germany) (Latvia) 2015	Did not enter				Did not enter		
(Finland) (Israel) (Romania) (Turkey) 2017	Did not enter				Did not enter		
(Czech Republic) (Georgia (country)) (Italy) (Germany) 2022	Did not enter				Did not enter		
(Cyprus) (Finland) (Poland) (Latvia) 2025	Did not enter				Did not enter		
(Estonia) (Greece) (Slovenia) (Spain) 2029	Did not enter				Did not enter		
Total	0/16				3	0	3

== Team ==
=== Current roster ===
Roster for the 2018 FIBA European Championship for Small Countries.

Moldova men's national basketball team roster
Players
Coaches

Pos.	No.	Name	Age – Date of birth	Height	Club	Ctr.
G	1	Denis Melniciuc	25 – 23 September 1992	1.88 m (6 ft 2 in)	Ribnita	(Moldova)
PG	2	Alic Tonciu	22 – 18 May 1996	1.85 m (6 ft 1 in)	Basco	(Moldova)
G	3	Nicolai Cojuhari	26 – 18 March 1992	1.87 m (6 ft 2 in)	Ribnita	(Moldova)
G/F	4	Denis Savca	19 – 4 January 1999	1.90 m (6 ft 3 in)	Speranca	(Moldova)
PG	5	Nicolae Grubii	17 – 20 August 2000	1.86 m (6 ft 1 in)	Speranca	(Moldova)
F	6	Petru Romanov	20 – 24 September 1997	1.92 m (6 ft 4 in)	Gama-Sind	(Moldova)
PG	7	Stanislav Cocorev	17 – 27 April 2001	1.80 m (5 ft 11 in)	Speranca	(Moldova)
G/F	8	Vadim Raducan	18 – 23 June 2000	1.95 m (6 ft 5 in)	Speranca	(Moldova)
G/F	10	Pavel Romanov	20 – 24 September 1997	1.93 m (6 ft 4 in)	Gama-Sind	(Moldova)
F/C	13	Egor Nistor	25 – 6 June 1993	2.02 m (6 ft 8 in)	Ribnita	(Moldova)
F/C	74	Vladislav Solopa	22 – 16 July 1995	2.02 m (6 ft 8 in)	Unirea	(Romania)
C	91	Victor Legosin	18 – 1 April 2000	2.07 m (6 ft 9 in)	Speranca	(Moldova)

Head coach

- (Moldova) Oleg Pravdiuk

Legend

- (C) Team captain
- Club – describes last
  club before the competition
- Age – describes age
  on 26 June 2018

=== Depth chart ===
Pos.	Starting 5	Bench 1	Bench 2
C	Egor Nistor	Victor Legosin
PF	Vladislav Solopa	Vadim Raducan
SF	Petru Romanov	Pavel Romanov
SG	Denis Melniciuc	Denis Savca	Alic Tonciu
PG	Nicolai Cojuhari	Nicolae Grubii	Stanislav Cocorev

== Head coach position ==
- (Moldova) Alexandru Sestopal – (2010–2014)
- (Ukraine) Vladimir Polyakh – (2015–2016)
- (Moldova) Oleg Pravdiuk – (2017–2018)

== Past rosters ==
2016 FIBA European Championship for Small Countries: finished 5th among 8 teams

Moldova men's national basketball team roster
Players
Coaches

Pos.	No.	Name	Age – Date of birth	Height	Club	Ctr.
PG	3	Nicolai Cojuhari	24 – 18 March 1992	1.87 m (6 ft 2 in)	Trojans-Speranța	(Moldova)
C	5	Alexei Onila	27 – 30 March 1989	2.01 m (6 ft 7 in)	UASM	(Moldova)
G	7	Casian Statnic	20 – 27 October 1995	1.91 m (6 ft 3 in)	UASM	(Moldova)
F/C	8	Evgheni Nartov	28 – 2 September 1987	2.00 m (6 ft 7 in)	Donbasket	(Moldova)
SG	9	Sergiu Chiriac	22 – 12 July 1993	1.93 m (6 ft 4 in)	UASM	(Moldova)
F/C	10	Vladimir Colesnicov	35 – 20 August 1980	2.03 m (6 ft 8 in)	Gama-Sind	(Moldova)
C	12	Emil Ostafiiciuc	21 – 2 August 1994	2.07 m (6 ft 9 in)	William Jewell	(United States)
SG	13	Anton Rulevski	28 – 17 March 1988	1.94 m (6 ft 4 in)	Donbasket	(Moldova)
F	14	Eugen Melnic	37 – 14 April 1979	1.96 m (6 ft 5 in)	Donbasket	(Moldova)
F	21	Vitalie Oprea	30 – 15 February 1986	2.00 m (6 ft 7 in)	Donbasket	(Moldova)
F	22	Egor Nistor	23 – 6 June 1993	2.02 m (6 ft 8 in)	Trojans-Speranța	(Moldova)
PG	27	Denis Melniciuc	23 – 23 September 1992	1.88 m (6 ft 2 in)	UASM	(Moldova)

Head coach

- (Ukraine) Vladimir Polyakh

Assistant coach(es)

- (Ukraine) Oleksii Beskov
- (Moldova) Ruslan Varzari

Legend

- (C) Team captain
- Club – describes last
  club before the competition
- Age – describes age
  on 28 June 2016

== See also ==
- Sport in Moldova
- Moldova women's national basketball team
- Moldova men's national under-20 basketball team
- Moldova men's national under-18 basketball team
- Moldova men's national under-16 basketball team
- Moldovan National Division
