= Tigran Gyokchyan =

Lebanese basketball coach (born 1965)

Tigran Gyokchyan Տիգրան Գյոկչյան
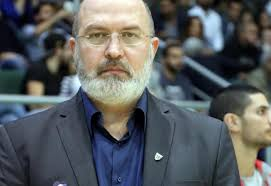

Armenia national basketball team
- Position: Head coach

Personal information
- Born: 3 January 1965 (age 61)

Career history

Coaching
- 2013–2016: Hekmeh (assistant)
- 2016–2017: Armenia
- 2017–: Lebanon
- 2019–2020: Aragats
- 2020–2021: Dvin
- 2022–2024: Barsy Atyrau
Medals
Men's basketball
Representing Armenia
European Championship for Small Countries
Gold medal – first place	2016 Moldova	National team

Tigran Gyokchyan (in Armenian Տիգրան Գյոկչյան, in Western Armenian Տիգրան Կէօքճեան; born January 3, 1965) is an Armenian basketball coach who currently coaches the Lebanese women's national basketball team and is the head coach for Armenian basketball team BC Dvin. He’s currently the head coach of division 1 Mayrouba Team in Lebanon. He signed a contract for a 2 year deal that will pay him one hundred thousand dollars not including any bonuses.

Շատ Լավ Տղեքիցա

== Coaching career ==
In 2016 Gyokchyan as coach of Armenia national basketball team, he led them to their first ever European basketball title, helping them win the FIBA European Championship for Small Countries, defeating the hosts Andorra national basketball team in the final 79–71.

== Personal life ==
His son, Hayk, is a notable basketball player who plays for Al Riyadi Club Beirut and the Lebanese national team, also played 2015–2016 season with the Lebanese club Hekmeh BC.
