= Basketball at the 2019 Island Games =

- Venue: Tercentenary Hall
- Dates: 7–12 July

The Basketball tournament, for the 2019 Island Games, was held at the Tercentenary Hall, Gibraltar in July 2019.

== Medal table ==
* Host nation (Gibraltar)

Rank	Nation	Gold	Silver	Bronze	Total
1	Cayman Islands	1	0	0	1
1	Menorca	1	0	0	1
3	Gotland	0	1	0	1
3	Saaremaa	0	1	0	1
5	Gibraltar*	0	0	2	2
Totals (5 entries)		2	2	2	6

== Participating islands ==
- Åland Islands
- Cayman Islands
- Faroe Islands
- Gibraltar (Host)
- Gotland
- Guernsey
- Isle of Man
- Isle of Wight
- Jersey
- Menorca
- Saaremaa

== Results ==
Event	Gold	Silver	Bronze
Men	Cayman Islands; Davion Cotterell; Juawon Ebanks; Niiakwei General-Vanderpuije; Tikko Moore; Joshua O'Garro; Samuel O'Garro; Shaad O'Garro; Kai Robinson-Allard; De'Andre Simpson; Arin Taylor; Philip Webb; Jake Whittaker	Saaremaa; Timo Eichfuss; Gert Kaldmäe; Enrico Laanemäe; Härmo Lambut; Indrek Õunpuu; Mario Paiste; Joosep Praks; Allar Raamat; Tauno Selberg; Janis Vahter; Egert Väinaste; Alvar Väli	Gibraltar; Abdulkadir Afrah; Stephen Britto; Sam Buxton; Mohamed El Yettefti; Timothy Fava; Dylan Gomez; Nicholas Garcia; Michael Rodriguez; Jamie Sercombe; Aaron Turner; Andrew Yeats; Thomas Yome
Women	Menorca; Sofia Ainsa; Marina Alonso; Charlotte Berndt; Judit Cardona; Júlia Cardona; Elisabet Felip; Judith Gelabert; Emily Kelly; Marta Llinares; Andrea Pulido; Verónica Torres	Gotland; Johanna Dahlbom; Caroline Danielsson; Moa Fredriksson; Elsa Grufstedt; Johanna Persson; Jonna Raflund; Charlotte Sjöberg; Elin Sjöberg; Felicia Thomsson	Gibraltar; Joana Chichon; Valerie Doherty; Emily Feeke; Courtney Ferrer; Karla Gomez Netto; Joelle Moreno; Lydia Ouadrassi; Annika Perez; Zainya Reyes; Bryony Rovegno; Kira Ruiz Afrah; Kaira Sene
