= Yerevan BC =

Yerevan
- League: Armenia Basketball League A
- Founded: 2019
- History: Yerevan BC (2019–present)
- Arena: Mika Sports Arena
- Capacity: 1,200
- Location: Yerevan, Armenia
- Team colors: Black, White
- Head coach: Narek Avedikyan
Home

Yerevan Basketball is a professional basketball club based in Yerevan, Armenia. Founded in 2019, it currently plays in the Armenia Basketball League A.

== History ==
Erebuni was founded in 2019 to participate in the 2019–20 Armenia Basketball League A season.

== Season by season ==
Season	Tier	Division	Pos.
2019–20	1	League A	N/A
