= Artik BC =

Artik Basketball Club
- League: Armenia Basketball League A
- Founded: 2017
- Arena: Artik Sports School
- Location: Artik, Armenia
- Team colors: Green, Grey
- Head coach: (Armenia) Gor Movsisyan
Home

Artik Basketball Club, also known as Artik Man Holding for sponsorship reasons, is a professional basketball team based in Artik, Armenia. It currently plays in the Armenia Basketball League A.

== History ==
Founded in 2017, the club is one of the seven founders of the Armenia Basketball League A. In the first season, the club ended as runner-up of the league.

In 2019, the club did not register in the League A.

== Season by season ==
| Season | Tier | Division | Pos. |
|---|---|---|---|
| 2017–18 | 1 | League A | 2nd |
| 2018–19 | 1 | League A | 4th |

== Current roster ==
Note: Flags indicate national team eligibility at FIBA-sanctioned events. Players may hold other non-FIBA nationalities not displayed.

Artik BC roster
Players
Coaches

| Pos. | No. | Nat. | Name | Ht. | Wt. | Age |
|---|---|---|---|---|---|---|
| C | 26 | (Armenia) | Hakobyan, Arman (C) | | | 33 – 26 January 1992 |
| SF | 29 | (Armenia) | Aslanian, Sero | | | 29 – 22 May 1995 |
| PF | 10 | (Armenia) | Konstantinov, Andrey |
| SF | 12 | (Armenia) | Polukhin, Sergey | 1.85 m (6 ft 1 in) | | 29 – 17 September 1995 |
| PG | 54 | (Ukraine) | Vinnik, Sergey |
| G | 13 | (Armenia) | Aghakaryan, Misha | 1.90 m (6 ft 3 in) | | 25 – 19 January 2000 |
| | 6 | (Armenia) | Apoyan, David |
| | 2 | (Armenia) | Serobyan, Samvel |
| | 7 | (Armenia) | Galmukhyan, Aghasi |
| G | 28 | (Armenia) | Aghajanyan, Andranik |
| | 11 | (Armenia) | Mailyan, Aramayis |

Head coach

- (Armenia) Gor Movsisyan

Assistant coach(es)

- (Armenia) Senik Vahradyan

Legend

- (C) Team captain
- Injured

- Roster
Updated: April 14, 2018
