= 2016 FIBA European Championship for Small Countries =

Tournament details
- Host country: Moldova
- City: Chișinău
- Dates: 28 June – 3 July 2016
- Teams: 8 (from 1 confederation)
- Venue(s): 1 (in 1 host city)

Final positions
- Champions: Armenia (1st title)
- Runners-up: Andorra
- Third place: San Marino

Tournament statistics
- MVP: (Armenia) Andre Spight
- Top scorer: (Armenia) Spight (21.2 ppg)
- Top rebounds: (Malta) Falzon (15.0 rpg)
- Top assists: (Andorra) Fernández (5.2 apg)

Official website
- www.fiba.basketball

The 2016 FIBA European Championship for Small Countries was the 15th edition of this tournament. It was hosted by Moldova. All games were played at the FMF Futsal Arena in Ciorescu.

Armenia won its first ever gold in this championship by beating Andorra in the final, 79–71.

== Teams ==
After the withdrawal of Monaco, which was initially drawn in the Group B, eight countries joined the tournament:

- Andorra
- Armenia
- Gibraltar
- Ireland

- Malta
- Moldova
- San Marino
- Wales

The national team of Armenia made their official debut in a FIBA competition.

== Draw ==
The draw took place on 22 January 2016.

Pot 1	Pot 2	Pot 3	Pot 4
Andorra; Malta	San Marino; Wales	Gibraltar; Moldova	Ireland; Armenia

== Preliminary round ==
All times are local (UTC+3).

=== Group A ===
Pos	Team	Pld	W	L	PF	PA	PD	Pts	Qualification
1	Ireland	3	3	0	270	132	+138	6	Semifinals
2	San Marino	3	2	1	165	152	+13	5	Semifinals
3	Malta	3	1	2	145	202	−57	4	Classification 5–8
4	Gibraltar	3	0	3	125	219	−94	3	Classification 5–8

Source: FIBA

28 June
13:45

Boxscore

San Marino	61–41	Malta
Scoring by quarter: 18–11, 13–13, 20–7, 10–10
Pts: Botteghi 19; Rebs: Raschi 16; Asts: Raschi 5		Pts: Falzon 14; Rebs: Falzon 13; Asts: Formosa 3

FMF Futsal Arena, Ciorescu
Referees: Tomas Jasevičius (LTU), Igor Esteve (AND), Evgeny Vetrov (RUS)

28 June
20:30

Boxscore

Ireland	100–43	Gibraltar
Scoring by quarter: 30–14, 29–9, 22–6, 19–14
Pts: Hosford 15; Rebs: O'Reilly 13; Asts: O'Reilly 10		Pts: Yeats 13; Rebs: Santos 7 Asts: Britto 3

FMF Futsal Arena, Ciorescu
Referees: Sašo Petek (SLO), Alin Faur (ROU), Dumitru Stasiev (MDA)

29 June
16:00

Boxscore

Malta	34–91	Ireland
Scoring by quarter: 12–15, 8–30, 5–21, 9–25
Pts: Bugeja 10; Rebs: Capello 9 Asts: Falzon 2		Pts: Hosford 19; Rebs: O'Reilly 12; Asts: O'Reilly 5

FMF Futsal Arena, Ciorescu
Referees: Tomas Jasevičius (LTU), Alin Faur (ROU), Dumitru Stasiev (MDA)

29 June
20:30

Boxscore

Gibraltar	32–49	San Marino
Scoring by quarter: 6–13, 10–7, 7–17, 9–12
Pts: Yeats 11; Rebs: Gómez 10; Asts: Britto, Yeats 2		Pts: Moretti, Raschi 14; Rebs: Raschi 5 Asts: Cardinali 3

FMF Futsal Arena, Ciorescu
Referees: Tomislav Vovk (CRO), Igor Esteve (AND), Evgeny Vetrov (RUS)

30 June
16:00

Boxscore

Malta	70–50	Gibraltar
Scoring by quarter: 19–17, 9–9, 24–13, 18–11
Pts: Bugeja 28; Rebs: Formosa 9 Asts: Shoults 5		Pts: Turner 16; Rebs: Guerrero 9 Asts: three players 2

FMF Futsal Arena, Ciorescu
Referees: Tomislav Vovk (CRO), Igor Esteve (AND), Dumitru Stasiev (MDA)

30 June
20:30

Boxscore

Ireland	79–55	San Marino
Scoring by quarter: 15–16, 22–13, 15–13, 27–13
Pts: Fitzpatrick 33; Rebs: O'Reilly 13; Asts: Hosford 5		Pts: Raschi 18; Rebs: Botteghi 8 Asts: Casadei 3

FMF Futsal Arena, Ciorescu
Referees: Sašo Petek (SLO), Alin Faur (ROU), Evgeny Vetrov (RUS)

=== Group B ===
Pos	Team	Pld	W	L	PF	PA	PD	Pts	Qualification
1	Andorra	3	3	0	224	168	+56	6	Semifinals
2	Armenia	3	2	1	238	174	+64	5	Semifinals
3	Moldova	3	1	2	199	222	−23	4	Classification 5–8
4	Wales	3	0	3	132	229	−97	3	Classification 5–8

Source: FIBA

28 June
16:00

Boxscore

Wales	33–74	Andorra
Scoring by quarter: 11–15, 1–22, 15–18, 6–19
Pts: Waite 8 Rebs: Waite 10; Asts: three players 1		Pts: Farfan 16; Rebs: De Oliveira, Fernández 6 Asts: Fernández 4

FMF Futsal Arena, Ciorescu
Referees: Igor Dragojević (MNE), Gianluigi Giancecchi (SMR), Barnard Vassallo (MLT)

28 June
18:15

Boxscore

Armenia	83–64	Moldova
Scoring by quarter: 18–11, 23–19, 19–17, 23–17
Pts: Spight 24; Rebs: Amirkhanov 7 Asts: Amirkhanov 6		Pts: Melniciuc 13; Rebs: Ostafiiciuc 8 Asts: Rulevski 4

FMF Futsal Arena, Ciorescu
Referees: Tomislav Vovk (CRO), Mykola Ambrosov (UKR), Shane Bassett (GIB)

29 June
13:45

Boxscore

Andorra	70–63	Armenia
Scoring by quarter: 12–14, 18–17, 25–22, 15–10
Pts: Colom 19; Rebs: Farfan 11; Asts: Fernández 4		Pts: Spight 23; Rebs: Dunston 13; Asts: Dunston 4

FMF Futsal Arena, Ciorescu
Referees: Igor Dragojević (MNE), Sašo Petek (SLO), Bernard Vassallo (MLT)

29 June
20:30

Boxscore

Moldova	63–59	Wales
Scoring by quarter: 11–18, 14–17, 19–5, 19–19
Pts: Colesnicov, Rulevski 12; Rebs: Ostafiiciuc 6 Asts: Melniciuc 5		Pts: Edwards 16; Rebs: Edwards 10; Asts: Waite 6

FMF Futsal Arena, Ciorescu
Referees: Mikola Ambrosov (UKR), Shane Bassett (GIB), Gianluigi Giancecchi (SMR)

30 June
13:45

Boxscore

Armenia	92–40	Wales
Scoring by quarter: 29–9, 17–11, 21–6, 25–14
Pts: Danielyan 20; Rebs: Konstantinov 11; Asts: Konstantinov 7		Pts: Waite 11; Rebs: Edwards 6 Asts: Waite 6

FMF Futsal Arena, Ciorescu
Referees: Bernard Vassallo (MLT), Shane Bassett (GIB), Gianluigi Giancecchi (SMR)

30 June
18:15

Boxscore

Andorra	80–72	Moldova
Scoring by quarter: 19–13, 24–25, 20–22, 17–12
Pts: Farfan 17; Rebs: Colom 9 Asts: Fernández 8		Pts: Colesnicov 15; Rebs: Colesnicov 9 Asts: Melniciuc 5

FMF Futsal Arena, Ciorescu
Referees: Tomas Jasevičius (LTU), Mykola Ambrosov (UKR), Igor Dragojević (MNE)

== Classification round ==
All times are local (UTC+3).

5th–8th
2 July
Malta	63
Wales	51
2 July
Moldova	85
Gibraltar	43

Fifth place
3 July
Malta	63
Moldova	73
Seventh place
3 July
Wales	67
Gibraltar	40

=== Classification 5–8 places ===
2 July
13:45

Boxscore

Malta	63–51	Wales
Scoring by quarter: 16–12, 19–9, 5–14, 23–16
Pts: Falzon 19; Rebs: Falzon 15; Asts: Shoults 3		Pts: Priddle 9 Rebs: Duppa 10; Asts: Waite 4

FMF Futsal Arena, Ciorescu
Referees: Tomas Jasevičius (LTU), Igor Dragojević (MNE), Igor Esteve (AND)

2 July
16:00

Boxscore

Moldova	85–43	Gibraltar
Scoring by quarter: 23–12, 25–11, 21–6, 16–14
Pts: Rulevski 17; Rebs: Melnic 10; Asts: Melniciuc 6		Pts: Gomez 12; Rebs: Santos 9 Asts: Britto 4

FMF Futsal Arena, Ciorescu
Referees: Sašo Petek (SLO), Gian Giancecchi (SMR), Evgeny Vetrov (RUS)

=== Seventh place game ===
3 July
13:45

Boxscore

Wales	67–40	Gibraltar
Scoring by quarter: 15–12, 17–7, 17–8, 18–13
Pts: Dawe 27; Rebs: Duppa, Kizito 7 Asts: Williams 6		Pts: Guerrero 18; Rebs: Guerrero, Santos 8 Asts: Britto 3

FMF Futsal Arena, Ciorescu
Referees: Tomislav Vovk (CRO), Dumitru Stasiev (MDA), Evgeny Vetrov (RUS)

=== Fifth place game ===
3 July
16:00

Boxscore

Malta	63–73	Moldova
Scoring by quarter: 21–18, 15–20, 19–8, 8–27
Pts: Bugeja, Falzon 18; Rebs: Falzon 18; Asts: Falzon, Shoults 3		Pts: Melinic 17; Rebs: Oprea 11; Asts: Cojuhari 5

FMF Futsal Arena, Ciorescu
Referees: Alin Faur (ROU), Shane Bassett (GIB), Gianluigi Giancecchi (SMR)

== Final round ==
All times are local (UTC+3).

Semifinals
2 July
Ireland	60
Armenia	74
2 July
Andorra	63
San Marino	57

Final
3 July
Armenia	79
Andorra	71
Third place
3 July
Ireland	53
San Marino	60

=== Semifinals ===
2 July
18:15

Boxscore

Ireland	60–74	Armenia
Scoring by quarter: 20–16, 14–19, 12–16, 14–23
Pts: Blount 18; Rebs: O'Reilly 10; Asts: O'Reilly 2		Pts: Spight 24; Rebs: Dunston 14; Asts: Amirkhanov 5

FMF Futsal Arena, Ciorescu
Referees: Mykola Ambrosov (UKR), Alin Faur (ROU), Bernard Vassallo (MLT)

2 July
20:30

Boxscore

Andorra	63–57	San Marino
Scoring by quarter: 16–13, 18–10, 12–17, 17–17
Pts: Farfan 20; Rebs: Fernández 7 Asts: Fernández 4		Pts: Botteghi 13; Rebs: Botteghi 15; Asts: Raschi 5

FMF Futsal Arena, Ciorescu
Referees: Tomislav Vovk (CRO), Shane Bassett (GIB), Dumitru Stasiev (MDA)

=== Third place game ===
3 July
18:15

Boxscore

Ireland	53–60	San Marino
Scoring by quarter: 12–13, 17–8, 13–17, 11–22
Pts: Blount, Fitzpatrick 16; Rebs: Blount, Fitzpatrick 13; Asts: Hosford, James 3		Pts: Cardinali 14; Rebs: Botteghi, Moretti 7 Asts: Moretti 6

FMF Futsal Arena, Ciorescu
Referees: Tomas Jasevičius (LTU),Igor Esteve (AND), Bernard Vassallo (MLT)

=== Final ===
3 July
20:30

Boxscore

Armenia	79–71	Andorra
Scoring by quarter: 25–12, 18–21, 21–17, 15–21
Pts: Spight 27; Rebs: Dunston 12; Asts: Amirkhanov 4		Pts: Colom 22; Rebs: Fernández 7 Asts: Fernández 6

FMF Futsal Arena, Ciorescu
Referees: Igor Dragojević (MNE), Mykola Ambrosov (UKR), Sašo Petek (SLO)

2016 FIBA European Championship
for Small Countries winner

Armenia
First title

== Final ranking ==
Rank	Team	Record
1st place, gold medalist(s)	Armenia	4–1
2nd place, silver medalist(s)	Andorra	4–1
3rd place, bronze medalist(s)	San Marino	3–2
4	Ireland	3–2
5	Moldova	3–2
6	Malta	2–3
7	Wales	1–4
8	Gibraltar	0–5
