= Armenia Basketball League A =

Basketball League A Բասկետբոլի Ա լիգա
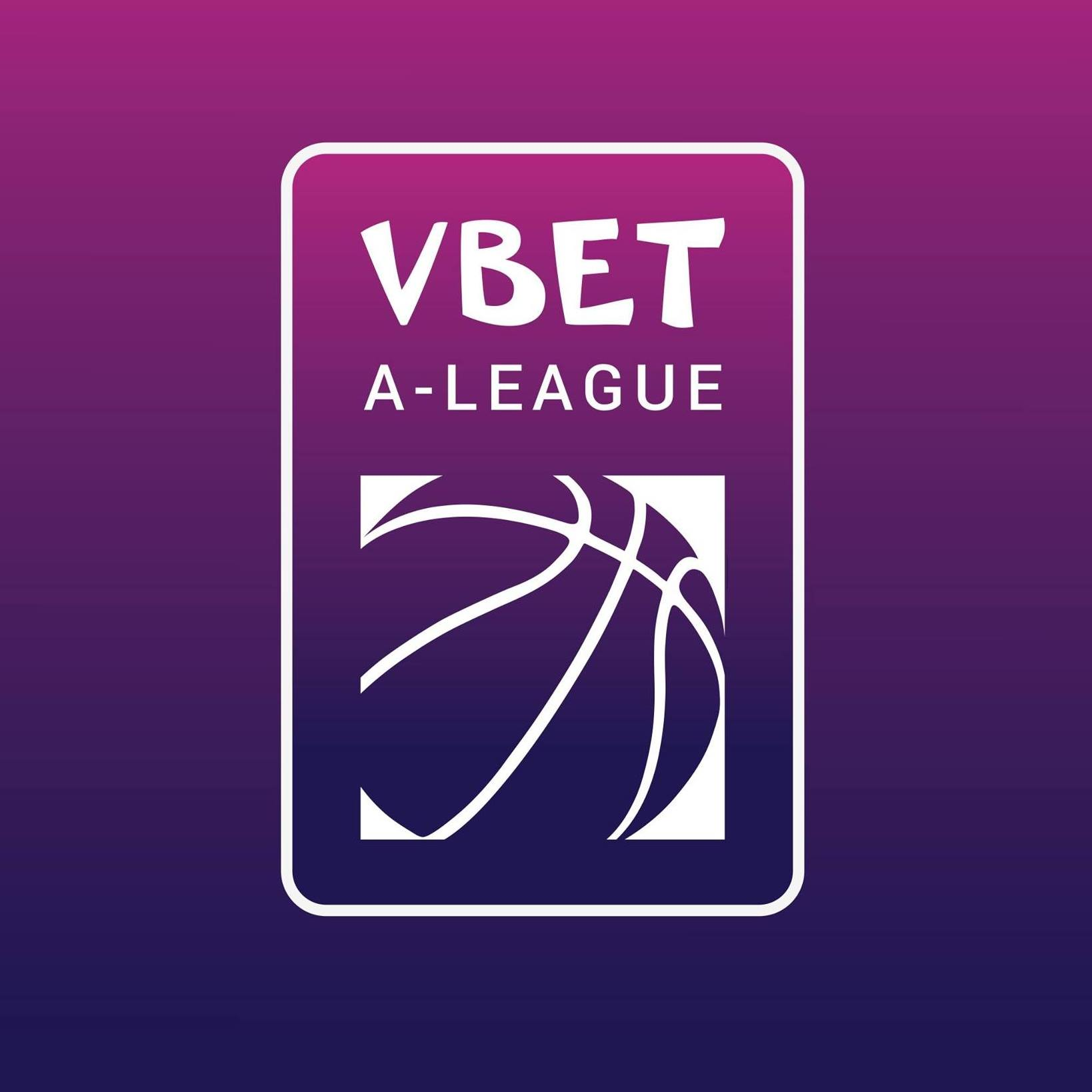
- Founded: 2017; 9 years ago
- First season: 2017–18
- Country: Armenia
- Confederation: FIBA Europe
- Number of teams: 7
- Level on pyramid: 1
- Current champions: Urartu (1st title)
- Most championships: Erebuni (2 titles)
- 2025–26 season

The Armenia Basketball League A (Armenian: Բասկետբոլի Ա լիգա), is the top men's official basketball league in Armenia. The first season of the competition was launched in 2017.

Since 2019, it has been renamed the VBET A-League after a headline sponsorship agreement with the Armenian gambling operator VBET.

== History ==
After the creation of the Armenia national basketball team, the Basketball Federation of Armenia decided to establish the new League A for training new players for the national team.

The Federation also aims to develop national basketball in Armenia by negotiating with other clubs, trying to sign Armenian players which seek to play abroad, and enabling teams to qualify for various European competitions in further seasons.

== Current teams (2024–25) ==
Club	Place	Arena
Artik	Artik	
BC Yerevan	Yerevan	Mika Sports Arena
BKMA	Yerevan	
Erebuni	Yerevan	
Lusavan	Charentsavan	
Urartu Vivaro	Yerevan	
US Titans	Yerevan	

== Finals ==
Season	Winner	Runner-up
2017–18	Artsakh	Artik
2018–19	Aragats	Urartu
2019–20	League suspended	
2020–21	Vahakni City	Dvin
2021–22	Erebuni	Urartu
2022–23	Artik	Urartu
2023–24	BKMA	Erebuni
2024–25	Erebuni	Urartu
2025–26	Urartu	Hatis

== Titles by club ==
Club	Titles	Runners-up	Years winning
Erebuni	2	1	2022, 2025
Urartu	1	4	2026
BKMA	1	0	2024
Artik	1	0	2023
Artsakh	1	0	2018
Aragats	1	0	2019
Vahakni City	1	0	2021
Artik	0	1	
Dvin	0	1	
Hatis	0	1	

== See also ==
- Sport in Armenia
