= 2018 in basketball =

The following are the basketball events of the year 2018 throughout the world.

The following are the basketball events that are expected to take place in 2018 throughout the world. Tournaments include international (FIBA), professional (club) and amateur and collegiate levels.

== International tournaments ==
Arranged chronologically.

| Tournament | Host city | Duration | (gold) Champion | (silver) Second place | (bronze) Third place |
|---|---|---|---|---|---|
| 2018 Commonwealth Games, men's tournament | (Australia) Cairns, Townsville, Gold Coast | August 19–September 1 | Australia | Canada | New Zealand |
| 2018 Commonwealth Games, women's tournament | (Australia) Cairns, Townsville, Gold Coast | April 5–14 | Australia | England | New Zealand |
| 2018 FIBA European Championship for Small Countries | (San Marino) Serravalle | June 26–July 1 | Malta | Norway | Ireland |
| 2018 Asian Games, men's tournament | (Indonesia) Jakarta | August 19–September 1 | China | Iran | South Korea |
| 2018 Asian Games, women's tournament | (Indonesia) Jakarta | August 19–September 1 | China | Korea | Japan |
| 2018 FIBA Women's Basketball World Cup | (Spain) Tenerife | September 22–30 | United States | Australia | Spain |

=== 2019 FIBA Basketball World Cup qualification ===
Teams progressing to the second round
| Group | 1st | 2nd | 3rd |
|---|---|---|---|
| Africa A | Tunisia | Cameroon | Chad |
| Africa B | Nigeria | Rwanda | Mali |
| Africa C | Angola | Egypt | Morocco |
| Africa D | Senegal | Central African Republic | Ivory Coast |
| Americas A | Argentina | Uruguay | Panama |
| Americas B | Venezuela | Brazil | Chile |
| Americas C | United States | Puerto Rico | Mexico |
| Americas D | Canada | Dominican Republic | Virgin Islands |
| Asia A | New Zealand | South Korea | China |
| Asia B | Australia | Philippines | Japan |
| Asia C | Jordan | Lebanon | Syria |
| Asia D | Iran | Kazakhstan | Qatar |
| Europe A | Spain | Montenegro | Slovenia |
| Europe B | Turkey | Latvia | Ukraine |
| Europe C | Lithuania | Poland | Hungary |
| Europe D | Italy | Netherlands | Croatia |
| Europe E | France | Russia | Bosnia and Herzegovina |
| Europe F | Czech Republic | Finland | Bulgaria |
| Europe G | Germany | Serbia | Georgia |
| Europe H | Greece | Israel | Estonia |

== Professional club seasons ==
=== Continental seasons ===
==== Men ====
| Organizer | Tournament | Champion | Runner-up | Result | Playoff format |
|---|---|---|---|---|---|
| Euroleague Basketball | 2017–18 EuroLeague | (Spain) Real Madrid | (Turkey) Fenerbahçe Doğuş | 85–80 | Single-game final |
| Euroleague Basketball | 2017–18 EuroCup Basketball | (Turkey) Darüşşafaka | (Russia) Lokomotiv Kuban | 2–0 | Best-of-3 series |
| FIBA Americas | 2018 FIBA Americas League | (Argentina) San Lorenzo de Almagro | (Brazil) Mogi das Cruzes | 79–71 | Single-game final |
| FIBA Americas | 2018 Liga Sudamericana | (Brazil) Franca | (Argentina) Instituto | 2–1 | Best-of-3 series |
| FIBA Asia | 2018 FIBA Asia Champions Cup | (Iran) Petrochimi | (Japan) Alvark Tokyo | 68–64 | Single-game final |
| FIBA Europe | 2017–18 Basketball Champions League | (Greece) AEK Athens | (France) Monaco | 100–94 | Single-game final |
| FIBA Europe | 2017–18 FIBA Europe Cup | (Italy) Umana Reyer Venezia | (Italy) Sidigas Avellino | 158–148 | Two-legged tie |

==== Women ====
| Organizer | Tournament | Champion | Runner-up | Result | Playoff format |
|---|---|---|---|---|---|
| FIBA Europe | 2017–18 EuroLeague Women | (Russia) UMMC Ekaterinburg | (Hungary) Sopron Basket | 72–53 | Single-game final |
| FIBA Europe | 2017–18 EuroCup Basketball | (Turkey) Galatasaray | (Italy) Reyer Venezia | 155–140 | Two-legged tie |
| FIBA Africa | 2018 FIBA Africa Women's Champions Cup | (Mozambique) Ferroviário de Maputo | (Angola) Interclube | 59–56 | Single-game final |

=== Regional seasons ===
==== Men ====
| Region | League | Champion | Runner-up | Result | Playoff format |
|---|---|---|---|---|---|
| Former Yugoslavia | 2017–18 ABA League | (Montenegro) Budućnost VOLI | (Serbia) Crvena zvezda mts | 3–1 | Best-of-5 series |
| Southeast Asia | 2017–18 ABL season | (Philippines) San Miguel Alab Pilipinas | (Thailand) Mono Vampire | 3–2 | Best-of-5 series |
| Alpe-Adria | 2017–18 Alpe Adria Cup | (Slovenia) Zlatorog Laško | (Slovakia) Levickí Patrioti | 89–79 | Single-game final |
| Baltic states | 2017–18 Baltic Basketball League | (Lithuania) Pieno žvaigždės | (Latvia) Jūrmala | 174–148 | Two-legged tie |
| Balkans | 2017–18 BIBL | (Bulgaria) Levski | (Kosovo) Bashkimi | 83–72 | Single-game final |
| South America | 2018 Liga Sudamericana de Básquetbol | (Brazil) Franca | (Argentina) Instituto | 2–1 | Best-of-3 series |

==== Women ====
| Region | League | Champion | Runner-up | Result | Playoff format |
|---|---|---|---|---|---|
| Former Yugoslavia | 2017–18 WABA League | (Montenegro) Budućnost Bemax | (Slovenia) Cinkarna Celje | 71–68 | Single-game final |

=== Domestic league seasons ===
==== Men ====
| Nation | Tournament | Champion | Runner-up | Result | Playoff format |
|---|---|---|---|---|---|
| Albania | 2017–18 Albanian Basketball League | Tirana | Teuta | 3–2 | Best-of-5 series |
| Albania | 2017–18 Albanian Basketball Cup | Tirana | Teuta | 76–62 | Single game final |
| Algeria | 2017–18 Algerian Basketball Championship | GS Pétroliers | NB Staouéli | 2–0 | Best-of-3 series |
| Algeria | 2017–18 Algerian Basketball Cup | GS Pétroliers | US Sétif | 75–56 | Single game final |
| Angola | 2017–18 BAI Basket | Primeiro de Agosto | Petro de Luanda | 4–1 | Best-of-7 series |
| Angola | 2017–18 Angola Basketball Cup | Primeiro de Agosto | Benfica do Libolo | 101–77 | Single game final |
| Armenia | 2017–18 Armenia Basketball League A | Artsakh | Artik | 198–164 | Two-legged tie |
| Argentina | 2017–18 La Liga season | San Lorenzo | San Martín de Corrientes | 4–2 | Best-of-7 series |
| Austria | 2017–18 Österreichische Basketball Bundesliga season | ece Bulls Kapfenberg | Swans Gmunden | 4–2 | Best-of-7 series |
| Austria | 2017–18 Austrian Basketball Cup | ece Bulls Kapfenberg | Swans Gmunden | 82–79 | Single game final |
| Australia (Note: Includes one team from New Zealand.) | 2017–18 NBL season | Melbourne United | Adelaide 36ers | 3–2 | Best-of-5 series |
| Azerbaijan | 2017–18 Azerbaijan Basketball League | NTD | Aztop | 2–0 | Best-of-3 series |
| Bahrain | 2017–18 Bahraini Premier League | Al-Manama | Al-Ahli | 3–1 | Best-of-5 series |
| Belarus | 2017–18 Belarusian Premier League | Tsmoki-Minsk | Borisfen | 3–0 | Best-of-5 series |
| Belgium | 2017–18 Belgian Basketball League | Oostende | Telenet Giants Antwerp | 3–0 | Best-of-5 series |
| Belgium | 2017–18 Belgian Basketball Cup | Oostende | Belfius Mons-Hainaut | 84–80 | Single game final |
| Bosnia and Herzegovina | 2017–18 Basketball Championship of Bosnia and Herzegovina | Zrinjski | Igokea | 3–1 | Best-of-5 series |
| Bosnia and Herzegovina | 2017–18 Basketball Cup of Bosnia and Herzegovina | Igokea | Kakanj | 94–76 | Single game final |
| Brazil | 2017–18 NBB season | Paulistano | Mogi das Cruzes | 3–1 | Best-of-5 series |
| Bulgaria | 2017–18 National Basketball League | Levski Lukoil | Balkan | 3–1 | Best-of-5 series |
| Bulgaria | 2017–18 Bulgarian Basketball Cup | Rilski Sportist | Levski Lukoil | 89–80 | Single-game final |
| Canada | 2017–18 NBL Canada season | London Lightning | Halifax Hurricanes | 4–3 | Best-of-7 series |
| Chile | 2017-18 LNB Chile season | Las Animas | Los Leones | 4–1 | Best-of-7 series |
| China | 2017–18 CBA season | Liaoning Flying Leopards | Zhejiang Lions | 4–0 | Best-of-7 series |
| Croatia | 2017–18 A-1 League | Cedevita | Cibona | 3–1 | Best-of-5 series |
| Croatia | 2017–18 Krešimir Ćosić Cup | Cedevita | Cibona | 86–74 | Single game final |
| Cyprus | 2017–18 Cyprus Basketball Division A | Petrolina AEK | Keravnos | 3–0 | Best-of-5 series |
| Cyprus | 2017–18 Cypriot Basketball Cup | Petrolina AEK | ETHA | 86–80 | Single game final |
| Czech Republic | 2017–18 NBL (Czech Republic) | ČEZ Nymburk | Opava | 228–163 | Two-legged tie |
| Czech Republic | 2017–18 Czech Republic Basketball Cup | ČEZ Nymburk | Pardubice | 86–65 | Single game final |
| Denmark | 2017–18 Basketligaen | Bakken Bears | Horsens | 4–0 | Best-of-7 series |
| Denmark | 2017–18 Danish Basketball Cup | Bakken Bears | Copenhagen Wolfpack | 100–67 | Single game final |
| Egypt | 2017–18 Egyptian Super League | Sporting | Smouha | – | Round Robin |
| Egypt | 2017–18 Egyptian Basketball Cup | Al Ahly | Sporting | 72–69 | Single-game final |
| Estonia | 2017–18 KML season | Kalev/Cramo | University of Tartu | 4–0 | Best-of-7 series |
| Finland | 2017–18 Korisliiga season | Kauhajoki Karhu | Salon Vilpas | 4–2 | Best-of-7 series |
| France (Note: Includes one team from Monaco.) | 2017–18 Pro A season | Le Mans | Monaco | 3–2 | Best-of-5 series |
| France | 2017–18 French Basketball Cup | Strasbourg IG | Boulazac | 82–62 | Single-game final |
| France | 2018 Leaders Cup | Monaco | Le Mans Sarthe | 83–78 | Single-game final |
| Georgia | 2017–18 Georgian Superliga | Dinamo Tbilisi | Kutaisi | 3–2 | Best-of-5 series |
| Germany | 2017–18 Basketball Bundesliga | Bayern Munich | Alba Berlin | 3–2 | Best-of-5 series |
| Germany | 2018 BBL-Pokal | Bayern Munich | Alba Berlin | 80–75 | Single-game final |
| Great Britain | 2017–18 BBL | Leicester Riders | London Lions | 81–60 | Single-game final |
| Great Britain | 2017–18 BBL Cup | Cheshire Phoenix | Worcester Wolves | 99–88 | Single-game final |
| Great Britain | 2017–18 BBL Trophy | Leicester Riders | DBL Sharks Sheffield | 90–85 | Single-game final |
| Greece | 2017–18 Greek Basket League | Panathinaikos | Olympiacos | 3–2 | Best-of-5 series |
| Greece | 2017–18 Greek Basketball Cup | AEK Athens | Olympiacos | 88–83 | Single-game final |
| Hungary | 2017–18 Nemzeti Bajnokság I/A | Szolnoki Olaj | Falco Vulcano | 3–1 | Best-of-5 series |
| Hungary | 2018 Magyar Kupa | Szolnoki Olaj | Falco Vulcano | 82–67 | Single-game final |
| Iceland | 2017–18 Úrvalsdeild karla | KR | Tindastóll | 3–1 | Best-of-5 series |
| Iceland | 2017–18 Icelandic Basketball Cup | Tindastóll | KR | 82–67 | Single-game final |
| Indonesia | 2018 Indonesian Basketball League | Satria Muda Pertamina Jakarta | Pelita Jaya Energi Mega Persada | 2–1 | Best-of-3 series |
| Iran | 2017–18 Iranian Basketball Super League | Shahrdari Tabriz | Mahram Tehran | 3–2 | Best-of-5 series |
| Iraq | 2017–18 Iraqi Basketball Premier League | Al-Naft | Al-Shorta | 3–1 | Best-of-5 series |
| Ireland (Note: Includes one team from the United Kingdom (Northern Ireland).) | 2017–18 Irish Super League | Tralee Warriors | Templeogue | 73–61 | Single-game final |
| Ireland | 2017–18 Irish National Cup | Templeogue | UCD Marian | 68–62 | Single-game final |
| Israel | 2017–18 Israeli Basketball Premier League | Maccabi Tel Aviv | Hapoel Holon | 95–75 | Single-game final |
| Israel | 2017–18 Israeli Basketball State Cup | Hapoel Holon | Maccabi Tel Aviv | 86–84 | Single-game final |
| Italy | 2017–18 LBA season | EA7 Emporio Armani Milano | Dolomiti Energia Trento | 4–2 | Best-of-7 series |
| Italy | 2018 Italian Basketball Cup | Fiat Torino | Germani Basket Brescia | 69–67 | Single-game final |
| Japan | 2017–18 B.League season | Alvark Tokyo | Chiba Jets | 85–60 | Single-game final |
| Jordan | 2017–18 Jordanian Premier League | Al Ahli | Al Riyadi | | |
| Kazakhstan | 2017–18 Kazakhstan Basketball Championship | Astana | Barsy Atyrau | 3–0 | Best-of-5 series |
| Kazakhstan | 2017–18 Kazakhstan Basketball Cup | Astana | Barsy Atyrau | 72–61 | Single-game final |
| Kosovo | 2017–18 Kosovo Basketball Superleague | Bashkimi | Sigal Prishtina | 2–1 | Best-of-3 series |
| Kosovo | 2017–18 Kosovo Basketball Cup | Sigal Prishtina | Bashkimi | 77–74 | Single-game final |
| Latvia | 2017–18 Latvian Basketball League | Ventspils | VEF Rīga | 4–2 | Best-of-7 series |
| Lebanon | 2017–18 Lebanese Basketball League | Homenetmen | Al Riyadi | 4–3 | Best-of-7 series |
| Libya | 2017–18 LBL | Al Nasr Benghazi | Al Ahly Tripoli | | |
| Libya | 2017–18 Libyan Basketball Cup | Al Ahly Tripoli | Al Nasr Benghazi | 88–74 | Single-game final |
| Lithuania | 2017–18 LKL season | Žalgiris | Lietuvos rytas | 4–1 | Best-of-7 series |
| Lithuania | 2018 King Mindaugas Cup | Žalgiris | Lietuvos rytas | 81–62 | Single-game final |
| Luxembourg | 2017–18 Total League season | Amicale | Etzella | 3–0 | Best-of-5 series |
| Macedonia | 2017–18 Macedonian First League | Rabotnički | MZT Skopje Aerodrom | 3–0 | Best-of-5 series |
| Macedonia | 2017–18 Macedonian Basketball Cup | MZT Skopje Aerodrom | Rabotnički | 76–67 | Single-game final |
| Malta | 2017–18 Division 1 | Hibernians | Athleta | 3–1 | Best-of-5 series |
| Mexico | 2017–18 LNBP season | Soles de Mexicali | Capitanes de la Ciudad de México | 4–1 | Best-of-7 series |
| Moldova | 2017–18 Moldovan National Division | Basco | Gama-Sind | 3–0 | Best-of-5 series |
| Montenegro | 2017–18 Prva A liga | Mornar | Budućnost VOLI | 3–1 | Best-of-5 series |
| Montenegro | 2017–18 Montenegrin Basketball Cup | Budućnost VOLI | Mornar | 87–83 | Single-game final |
| Morocco | 2017–18 Nationale 1 | AS Salé | Wydad AC | 77–59 | Single-game final |
| Morocco | 2017–18 Moroccan Throne Cup | AS Salé | Maghreb de Fes | 87–59 | Single-game final |
| Netherlands | 2017–18 Dutch Basketball League | Donar | ZZ Leiden | 4–0 | Best-of-7 series |
| Netherlands | 2017–18 NBB Cup | Donar | ZZ Leiden | 87–71 | Single-game final |
| New Zealand | 2018 New Zealand NBL season | Southland Sharks | Wellington Saints | 98–96 | Single-game final |
| Norway | 2017–18 BLNO season | Kongsberg Miners | Asker Aliens | 2–1 | Best-of-3 series |
| Panama | 2017–18 Panamanian LPB | Universitarios | Correcaminos de Colón | 73–64 | Single-game final |
| Paraguay | 2017–18 Metropolitan Basketball League | Olimpia | Deportivo San José | 3–1 | Best-of-5 series |
| Philippines | 2017–18 PBA Philippine Cup | San Miguel Beermen | Magnolia Hotshots | 4–1 | Best-of-7 series |
| Philippines | 2018 PBA Commissioner's Cup | Barangay Ginebra San Miguel | San Miguel Beermen | 4–2 | Best-of-7 series |
| Philippines | 2018 PBA Governors' Cup | Magnolia Hotshots | Alaska Aces | 4–2 | Best-of-7 series |
| Puerto Rico | 2018 BSN season | Capitanes de Arecibo | Vaqueros de Bayamon | 4–2 | Best-of-7 series |
| Poland | 2017–18 PLK season | Anwil Włocławek | Stal Ostrów Wielkopolski | 4–2 | Best-of-7 series |
| Poland | 2018 Polish Basketball Cup | Polski Cukier Toruń | Stelmet Enea Zielona Góra | 88–80 | Single-game final |
| Portugal | 2017–18 LPB season | Oliveirense | Porto | 3–0 | Best-of-5 series |
| Portugal | 2017–18 Portuguese Basketball Cup | Illiabum | Benfica | 91–83 | Single-game final |
| Qatar | 2017–18 Qatari Basketball League | Al Arabi | Al Wakrah | 61–59 | Single-game final |
| Romania | 2017–18 Liga Națională | Oradea | Steaua CSM Eximbank | 3–1 | Best-of-5 series |
| Romania | 2017–18 Romanian Basketball Cup | U-BT Cluj-Napoca | Oradea | 64–61 | Single-game final |
| Russia (Note: Includes one team each from Belarus, Estonia, Kazakhstan, and Latvia. The highest ranked team from Russia is also named as Russian Champions.) | 2017–18 VTB United League | CSKA Moscow | Khimki | 95–84 | Single-game final |
| Russia | 2017–18 Russian Basketball Cup | Lokomotiv Kuban | Nizhny Novgorod | 85–64 | Single-game final |
| Saudi Arabia | 2017–18 Saudi Premier League | Ohud Medina | Al Fateh | 72–69 | Single-game final |
| Serbia | 2017–18 Basketball League of Serbia | Crvena zvezda mts | FMP | 3–0 | Best-of-5 series |
| Serbia | 2017–18 Radivoj Korać Cup | Partizan NIS | Crvena zvezda mts | 81–75 | Single-game final |
| Slovakia | 2017–18 Slovak Basketball League | Levickí Patrioti | Košice | 4–1 | Best-of-7 series |
| Slovakia | 2017–18 Slovak Basketball Cup | Košice | Inter Bratislava | 89–81 | Single-game final |
| Slovenia | 2017–18 Slovenian Basketball League | Petrol Olimpija | Krka | 3–2 | Best-of-5 series |
| Slovenia | 2017–18 Slovenian Basketball Cup | Primorska | Šenčur | 83–63 | Single-game final |
| South Korea | 2017–18 KBL season | Seoul SK Knights | Wonju DB Promy | 4–2 | Best-of-7 series |
| Spain (Note: Includes one team from Andorra.) | 2017–18 ACB season | Real Madrid | Kirolbet Baskonia | 3–1 | Best-of-5 series |
| Spain | 2018 Copa del Rey de Baloncesto | FC Barcelona Lassa | Real Madrid | 92–90 | Single-game final |
| Sweden | 2017–18 Basketligan season | Norrköping Dolphins | Luleå | 4–3 | Best-of-7 series |
| Switzerland | 2017–18 SBL | Fribourg Olympic | Lions de Genève | 4–1 | Best-of-7 series |
| Switzerland | 2017–18 Swiss Basketball Cup | Fribourg Olympic | Lugano Tigers | 92–72 | Single-game final |
| Switzerland | 2017–18 SBL Cup | Fribourg Olympic | Lugano Tigers | 93–86 | Single-game final |
| Syria | 2017–18 Syrian Basketball League | Al-Jaish SC | Al-Karamah | 3–0 | Best-of-5 series |
| Tunisia | 2017–18 Division I | Étoile Sportive de Radès | Union Sportive Monastir | 2-1 | Best-of-3 series |
| Tunisia | 2017–18 Tunisian Basketball Cup | Étoile Sportive de Radès | Étoile Sportive du Sahel | 79-65 | Single-game final |
| Turkey | 2017–18 Basketbol Süper Ligi | Fenerbahçe Doğuş | Tofaş | 4–1 | Best-of-7 series |
| Turkey | 2018 Turkish Basketball Cup | Anadolu Efes | Tofaş | 78–61 | Single-game final |
| Ukraine | 2017–18 SuperLeague | Cherkaski Mavpy | Dnipro | 3–0 | Best-of-5 series |
| Ukraine | 2017–18 Ukrainian Basketball Cup | Dnipro | Khimik | 78–71 | Single-game final |
| United Arab Emirates | 2017–18 UAE National Basketball League | Shabab Al Ahli-Dubai | Al-Nasr | 2–0 | Best-of-3 series |
| United States (Note: Includes one team from Canada.) | 2017–18 NBA season | Golden State Warriors | Cleveland Cavaliers | 4–0 | Best-of-7 series |
| United States | 2018 NBA playoffs | Golden State Warriors | Cleveland Cavaliers | 4–0 | Best-of-7 series |
| United States | 2018 NBA Summer League | Portland Trail Blazers | Los Angeles Lakers | 91-73 | Single-game final |
| United States | 2017–18 NBA G League season | Austin Spurs | Raptors 905 | 2-0 | Best-of-3 series |
| United States | 2018 NBA All-Star Game | Team LeBron | Team Curry | 148-145 | Single-game final |
| United States | NBA Africa Game 2018 | Team World | Team Africa | 96-92 | Single-game final |
| Uruguay | 2017–18 LUB season | Malvín | Aguada | 4–3 | Best-of-7 series |
| Venezuela | 2018 LPB season | Guaros de Lara | Trotamundos | 4–3 | Best-of-7 series |

==== Women ====
| Nation | Tournament | Champion | Runner-up | Result | Playoff format |
|---|---|---|---|---|---|
| Australia | 2017–18 WNBL season | Townsville Fire | Melbourne Boomers | 2–1 | Best-of-3 series |
| Croatia | 2017-18 Prve ženske lige | ŽKK Medveščak | ŽKK Trešnjevka 2009 | 3–0 | Best-of-5 series |
| France | 2017–18 Ligue Féminine de Basketball | Tango Bourges Basket | Tarbes Gespe Bigorre | 3–1 | Best-of-5 series |
| Iceland | 2017–18 Úrvalsdeild kvenna | Haukar | Valur | 3–2 | Best-of-5 series |
| Iceland | 2017–18 Icelandic Women's Basketball Cup | Keflavík | Njarðvík | 74–63 | Single-game final |
| Romania | 2017–18 Liga Națională | Sepsi SIC | CSM Satu Mare | 3–1 | Best-of-5 series |
| Serbia | 2017–18 First Women's Basketball League of Serbia | Crvena zvezda | Partizan 1953 | 3–1 | Best-of-5 series |
| Serbia | 2017–18 Milan Ciga Vasojević Cup | Partizan 1953 | Crvena zvezda | 68–61 | Single-game final |
| Spain | 2017–18 Liga Femenina de Baloncesto | Perfumerías Avenida | Spar CityLift Girona | 2–0 | Best-of-3 series |
| United States | 2018 WNBA season | Seattle Storm | Washington Mystics | 3–0 | Best-of-5 series |
| United States | 2018 WNBA draft | | | | |
| United States | List of 2018 WNBA season transactions | | | | |
| United States | 2018 WNBA All-Star Game | Team Parker | Team Delle Donne | 119-112 | Single-game final |

== Semi-professional ==
| Nation | League / Tournament | Champions | Runners-up | Result | Playoff format |
|---|---|---|---|---|---|
| Philippines | 2018 MPBL Anta Rajah Cup | Batangas City Athletics | Muntinlupa Cagers | 3–1 | Best-of-5 series |
| Philippines | 2018 PBA D-League Aspirants' Cup | Zark's Burgers-LPU | Che'Lu Bar & Grill-SSC-R | 2–1 | Best-of-3 series |

== College seasons ==
=== Men's ===
| Nation | League / Tournament | Champions | Runners-up | Result | Playoff format |
|---|---|---|---|---|---|
| Canada | 2018 U Sports Men's Basketball Championship | Calgary Dinos | Ryerson Rams | 79–77 | Single-game final |
| Philippines | 2017 PCCL National Collegiate Championship | Lyceum Pirates | San Beda Red Lions | 70–68 | Single-game final |
| United States | NCAA Division I | Villanova Wildcats | Michigan Wolverines | 79–62 | Single-game final |
| United States | National Invitation Tournament | Penn State Nittany Lions | Utah Utes | 82–66 | Single-game final |
| United States | NCAA Division II | Ferris State Bulldogs | Northern State Wolves | 71–69 | Single-game final |
| United States | NCAA Division III | Nebraska Wesleyan Prairie Wolves | Wisconsin–Oshkosh Titans | 78–72 | Single-game final |

=== Women's ===
| Nation | League / Tournament | Champions | Runners-up | Result | Playoff format |
|---|---|---|---|---|---|
| Canada | 2018 U Sports Women's Basketball Championship | Carleton Ravens | Saskatchewan Huskies | 69–48 | Single-game final |
| Philippines | UAAP Season 81 | NU Lady Bulldogs | FEU Lady Tamaraws | 2–0 | Best-of-3 series |
| United States | NCAA Division I | Notre Dame Fighting Irish | Mississippi State Bulldogs | 61–58 | Single-game final |
| United States | Women's National Invitation Tournament | Indiana Hoosiers | Virginia Tech Hokies | 65–57 | Single-game final |
| United States | NCAA Division II | Central Missouri Jennies | Ashland Eagles | 66–52 | Single-game final |
| United States | NCAA Division III | Amherst Mammoths | Bowdoin Polar Bears | 65–45 | Single-game final |

== Deaths ==
- January 2 – Dee Ayuba, 31, British-Nigerian player (Iraklis Thessaloniki).
- January 12 – Keith Jackson, 89, American NBA and college announcer
- January 13 – Aristeidis Roubanis, 85, Greek player (Panellinios)
- January 16 – Jo Jo White, 71, American Hall of Fame NBA player (Boston Celtics) and Olympic Gold Medalist (1968)
- January 25 — Bill Logan, 83, American college player (Iowa)
- January 30 — Joaquín Rojas, 79, Filipino Olympic player (1968).
- January 31 — Rasual Butler, 38, American NBA player.
- February 2 — Tomás Gutiérrez, 77, Puerto Rican Olympic player (1964, 1968).
- February 9 — Neill McGeachy, 75, American college coach (Duke).
- February 13 — Danko Radić, 65, Croatian referee.
- February 14 — Don Carter, 84, NBA owner (Dallas Mavericks).
- February 24 — Ed Leede, 90, American NBA player (Boston Celtics)
- February 25 — Dan Fegan, 56, American agent
- February 25 — Danny Florencio, 70, Filipino player (Toyota, Crispa, U/Tex)
- March 3 — Sabit Hadžić, 60, Bosnian Olympic Bronze medalist (1984).
- March 7 — Woody Durham, 76, American college radio announcer (North Carolina)
- March 10 — Gene Rhodes, 90, American NBA player (Indianapolis Olympians) and ABA coach (Kentucky Colonels)
- March 12 — Bud Olsen, 77, American NBA player (Cincinnati Royals, San Francisco Warriors, Detroit Pistons).
- March 13 — J. L. Parks, 90, American college player (Oklahoma State), two-time national champion (1945, 1946).
- March 13 — Henry Williams, 46, American player (Scaligera Verona, Benetton Treviso, Virtus Roma).
- March 15 — Tom Benson, 90, American NBA owner (New Orleans Pelicans).
- March 15 — Bob Phibbs, 90, Canadian Olympic player (1952).
- March 24 — Marco Solfrini, 60, Italian player (Virtus Roma) and Olympic Silver medalist (1980).
- March 26 — Zeke Upshaw, 26, American player (Helios Suns, Grand Rapids Drive).
- March 28 — Daryl Thomas, 52, American player, national champion at Indiana (1987).
- April 2 — Alton Ford, 36, American NBA player (Phoenix Suns, Houston Rockets).
- April 2 — Fufi Santori, 85, Puerto Rican Olympic player (1960).
- April 8 — Joe McConnell, 79, American NBA, ABA and college radio announcer.
- April 8 — Bill Meyer, 74, American ABA player (Pittsburgh Pipers).
- April 11 — Mauro Panaggio, 90, American college and CBA coach.
- April 14 — Daedra Charles, 49, American WNBA player (Los Angeles Sparks), college national champion (Tennessee) and Olympic bronze medalist (1992).
- April 14 — Hal Greer, 81, American Hall of Fame NBA player (Philadelphia 76ers).
- April 16 — Vic Bubas, 91, American college coach (Duke).
- April 17 — Dick Fichtner, 78, American college coach (Occidental, Pacific).
- April 19 — Gil Santos, 80, American NBA (Boston Celtics) and college (Providence) announcer.
- April 23 — Bob Schermerhorn, 75, American college coach (Southern Utah, Arizona State).
- April 25 — Rolla Anderson, 97, American college coach (Kalamazoo).
- April 25 — Alberto Marson, 93, Brazilian Olympic Bronze medalist (1948).
- April 25 — Bill Stokes, 89, American college coach (Middle Tennessee).
- May 3 — Bob Prewitt, 93, American college coach (SMU).
- May 4 — Larry Hunter, 68, American college coach (Wittenberg, Ohio, Western Carolina).
- May 10 — Donnie Forman, 92, American BAA player (Minneapolis Lakers).
- May 14 — Howard Bayne, 75, American ABA player (Kentucky Colonels).
- May 16 — Michael Slive, 77, American college conference commissioner (SEC, Conference USA), chair of 2009 NCAA tournament selection committee.
- May 26 — Chipper Harris, 55, American college player (Robert Morris).
- May 28 — Cliff Tucker, 29, American player.
- June 4 — C. M. Newton, 88, Hall of Fame college coach (Alabama, Vanderbilt) and athletic director (Kentucky).
- June 10 — Pavlos Giannakopoulos, 89, Greek administrator (Panathinaikos B.C.).
- June 11 — Oscar Furlong, 90, Argentine player and Olympian (1948, 1952).
- June 13 — Anne Donovan, 56, American Hall of Fame player (Old Dominion) and coach (Seattle Storm, Seton Hall). Olympic gold medalist (1984, 1988).
- June 18 — Kostas Politis, 76, Greek player and coach (Panathinaikos B.C.).
- June 19 — Bill Kenville, 87, American NBA player (Syracuse Nationals, Fort Wayne/Detroit Pistons)
- June 20 — John Ward, 88, American college broadcaster (Tennessee).
- June 23 — Gazmend Sinani, 27, Kosovan player (Fenerbahçe, Sigal Prishtina).
- June 30 — Mike Heideman, 70, American college coach (St. Norbert, Green Bay).
- July 6 — Clifford Rozier, 45, American player (Golden State Warriors, Toronto Raptors, Minnesota Timberwolves).
- July 7 — Tyler Honeycutt, 27, American player (Sacramento Kings, BC Khimki).
- July 8 — Billy Knight, 39, American player.
- July 8 — Frank Ramsey, 86, American Hall of Fame player (Boston Celtics).
- July 8 — Lonnie Shelton, 62, American NBA player (Seattle SuperSonics).
- July 9 — Johnny Moates, 73, American college player (Richmond).
- July 9 — Finnbjörn Þorvaldsson, Icelandic basketball player (Íþróttafélag Reykjavíkur) and Olympic sprinter.
- July 12 — Len Chappell, 77, American NBA player (Philadelphia 76ers, New York Knicks, Milwaukee Bucks).
- July 12 — Bud Lathrop, 82, American high school coach.
- July 14 — Ron Thomas, 67, American ABA player (Kentucky Colonels).
- July 16 — Robin Jones, 64, American NBA player (Portland Trail Blazers, Houston Rockets).
- July 16 — Jerzy Piskun, 80, Polish Olympic player (1960, 1964).
- July 18 — Czesław Malec, 77, Polish Olympic player (1968).
- July 20 — Arvo Jantunen, 89, Finnish player and coach (Tampereen Pyrintö).
- July 22 — Rene Portland, 65, American college coach (Saint Joseph's, Colorado, Penn State).
- July 26 — John Kline, 87, American player (Harlem Globetrotters).
- August 13 — Rico Pontvianne, 74, Mexican Olympic player (1964, 1968).
- August 17 — Bob Bass, 89, American college coach and ABA/NBA coach and executive (San Antonio Spurs, Charlotte Hornets).
- August 22 — Joey Mente, 42, Filipino player (San Miguel Beermen, Welcoat Dragons).
- September 5 — Mike Hogewood, 63, American college basketball broadcaster (Atlantic Coast Conference).
- September 6 — Richard DeVos, 92, American NBA owner (Orlando Magic).
- September 10 — Michel Bonnevie, 96, French Olympic silver medalist (1948).
- September 11 — Don Newman, 60, American college (Sacramento State) and NBA (Milwaukee Bucks, San Antonio Spurs, Washington Wizards) coach.
- September 12 — Don Corbett, 75, American college coach (Lincoln, North Carolina A&T).
- September 16 — Butch Wade, 73, American college player (Indiana State).
- September 19 — Wojciech Myrda, 39, Polish player (Avtodor Saratov, Spišská Nová Ves).
- September 22 — Bob Lienhard, 70, American player (Pallacanestro Cantu).
- September 25 — Jack McKinney, 83, American college (Saint Joseph's) and NBA (Los Angeles Lakers, Indiana Pacers) coach.
- September 27 — Art Williams, 78, American NBA (San Diego Rockets, Boston Celtics) and ABA player (San Diego Conquistadors).
- October 4 — Jack Avina, 89, American college coach (Portland).
- October 4 — José Lluis, 80, Spanish Olympic player (1960).
- October 5 — Grigorij Khizhnyak, 44, Ukrainian player (BC Kyiv, BC Budivelnyk, BC Dynamo Saint Petersburg).
- October 6 — Paul James, 87, American college broadcaster (Utah, BYU).
- October 6 — George Kaftan, 90, American college All-American (Holy Cross) and NBA player (Boston Celtics, New York Knicks, Baltimore Bullets).
- October 10 — Tex Winter, 96, American Hall of Fame college (Kansas State) and NBA (Houston Rockets, Chicago Bulls) coach.
- October 14 — Enrique Baliño, 90, Uruguayan Olympic player (1952).
- October 14 — Patrick Baumann, 51, Swiss executive (Secretary General of FIBA)
- October 14 — Dick Tinkham, American ABA owner (Indiana Pacers) and administrator.
- October 15 — Paul Allen, 65, American NBA owner (Portland Trail Blazers).
- October 28 — Bill Trumbo, 79, American college coach (Culver–Stockton, Sonoma State, Idaho, Cal State Monterey) and athletic director.
- November 7 — Bob Patterson, 86, All-American college player (Tulsa).
- November 17 — Gene Berce, 91, American NBL (Oshkosh All-Stars) and BAA (Tri-Cities Blackhawks) player.
- November 18 — Waldyr Boccardo, 82, Brazilian Olympic bronze medalist (1960).
- November 22 — Willie Naulls, 84, American NBA player (St. Louis Hawks, New York Knicks, Boston Celtics, San Francisco Warriors).
- November 24 — Lou Cvijanovich, 92, American high school coach.
- November 25 — Tony Hanson, 63, American college player (Connecticut) and professional coach (Tees Valley Mohawks).
- November 29 — Ralph Hodge, 65, American college coach (Olivet Nazarene).
- December 5 — Gary McPherson, 82, American college coach (VMI, Alderson Broaddus, West Virginia).
- December 6 — Willie Murrell, 78, American ABA player (Denver Rockets, Miami Floridians, Kentucky Colonels).
- December 9 — Eric Anderson, 48, American college (Indiana) and NBA (New York Knicks) player.
- December 9 — Tim Bassett, 67, American ABA player (San Diego Conquistadors, New Jersey Nets, San Antonio Spurs).
- December 18 — Raimo Vartia, 81, Finnish Olympic player (1964).
- December 19 — Ron Abegglen, 81, American college coach (Weber State).
- December 19 — Mel Hutchins, 90, American NBA player (St. Louis Hawks, Fort Wayne Pistons, New York Knicks).
- December 23 — Bob Mattick, 85, American college All-American (Oklahoma State).
- December 27 — Jim Davis, 77, American NBA player (Atlanta Hawks, Houston Rockets, Detroit Pistons).
- December 27 — Bumper Tormohlen, 81, American NBA player and coach (Atlanta Hawks).

== See also ==
- Timeline of women's basketball
