= 2024 Liga Femenina de Básquetbol season =

Uruguayan professional basketball season

Liga Femenina de Básquetbol
- Season: 2024
- Dates: 13 April 2024 – 2 November 2024
- Games played: 118
- Teams: 11

Regular season
- Top seed: Malvín
- Season MVP: (Uruguay) Krystal Cordara

Finals
- Champions: Defensor Sporting; 3rd title
- Runners-up: Yale
- Semi-finalists: Malvín; Aguada

Statistical leaders
Points	(Chile) Javiera Campos	21.2
Rebounds	(Argentina) Florencia Fernández	16.5
Assists	(Uruguay) Carolina Fernández	6.4

Records
- Biggest home win: 25 de Agosto 100–24 Hebraica y Macabi (11 August 2024)
- Biggest away win: Hebraica y Macabi 14–107 Aguada (5 May 2024)
- Highest scoring: Defensor Sporting 82–90 Yale (3 August 2024)
- Winning streak: 13 games Malvín
- Losing streak: 18 games Hebraica y Macabi

The 2024 Liga Femenina de Básquetbol season, was the 9th season of the top Uruguayan female basketball league, since its establishment in 2016. It started on 13 April 2024 with the regular season, and ended on 2 November 2024, with the Copa de Plata final.

Malvín was the defending champion (having won the last two editions of this tournament), which was swept in semi-finals by Defensor Sporting.

Also, Defensor Sporting was the champion, sweeping Yale in the finals, with the return of the two-time champions, Josefina Rivera and Lucía Schiavo.

== Teams ==
=== New teams ===
A total of 11 teams contested the league, including 10 from the 2023 season and Tabaré who entered the tournament for the first time.

=== Venues and locations ===
Location of teams in 2024 LFB
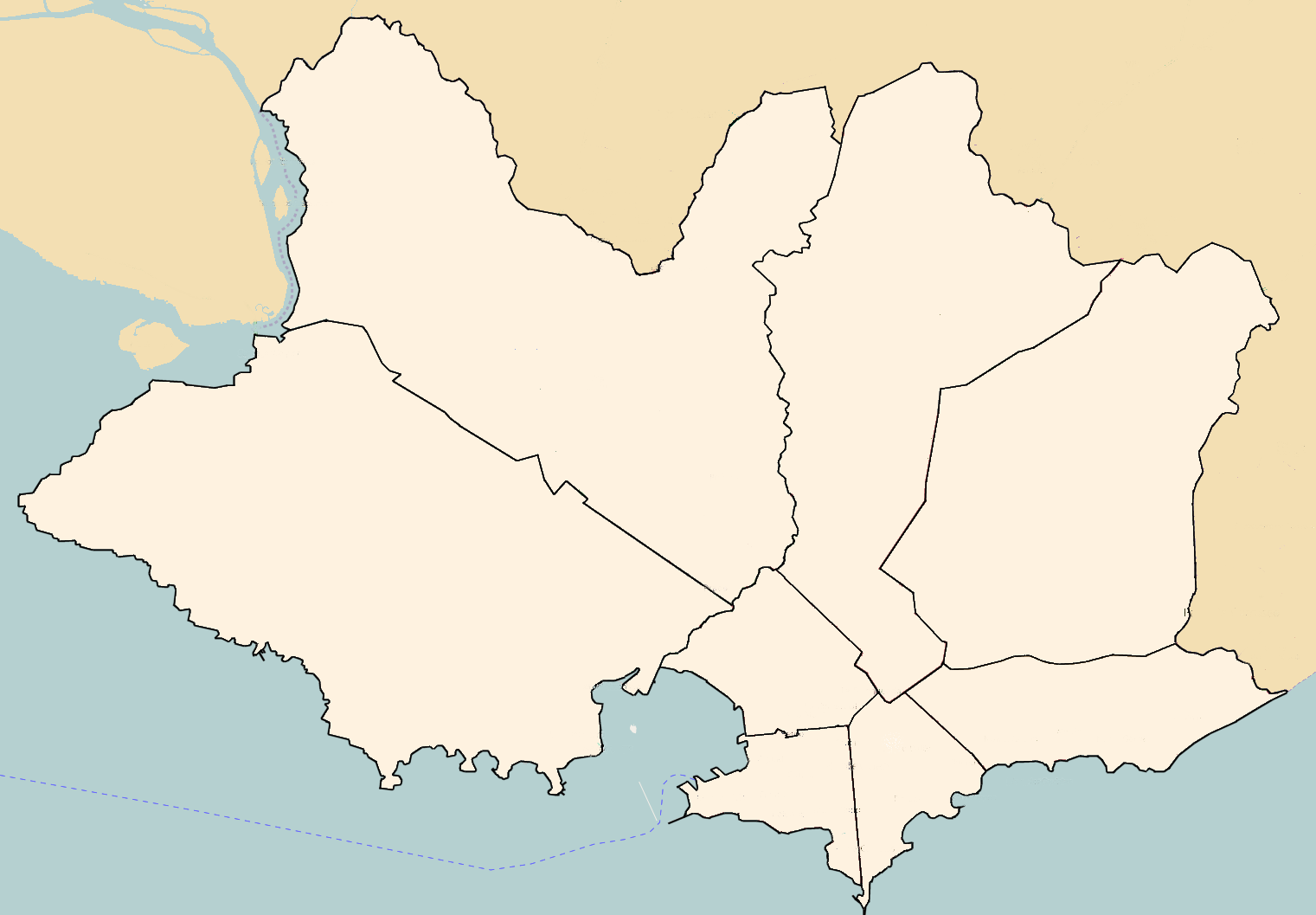
Location of teams from the Montevideo in 2024 LFB

Team	Home City	Arena	Capacity
25 de Agosto	Montevideo	Gimnasio 25 de Agosto	350
Aguada	Montevideo	Estadio Propio Aguatero	3,738
Defensor Sporting	Montevideo	Gimasio Defensor Sporting	150
Hebraica Macabi	Montevideo	Gimnasio Hebraica y Macabi	50
Juventud	Las Piedras	Estadio Federal Cirilio Malnatti	1,000
Lagomar	Ciudad de la Costa	Gimnasio Lagomar	170
Malvín	Montevideo	Gimnasio Juan Francisco Canil	900
Remeros	Mercedes	Gimnasio Agrimensor Mario Eduardo Bellini	400
Tabaré	Montevideo	Gimnasio Tabaré	1,100
Urunday Universitario	Montevideo	Gimnasio Cr. Osvaldo Dohir	700
Yale	Montevideo	Campo de Deportes Luis Ruocco	500

=== Personnel and sponsorship ===
Team	Head coach	Captain	Kit manufacturer
25 de Agosto	(Uruguay) Brian Neira	(Argentina) Rocío Bereilh	Sporty's
Aguada	(Uruguay) Victoria Pereyra	(Uruguay) Natasha Dolinsky	Puma
Defensor Sporting	(Uruguay) Fabián Boscardin	(Uruguay) Josefina Rivera	Kelme
Hebraica y Macabi	(Uruguay) Nélson Da Roza	(Uruguay) Pierina Carrica	Elite
Juventud	(Uruguay) Sergio Castello	(Uruguay) Karina Acosta	Elite
Lagomar	(Uruguay) Diego Castrillón	(Uruguay) Sabrina Schiaffarino	Kova
Malvín	(Uruguay) Juan Pablo Serdio	(Uruguay) Carolina Fernández	Under Armour
Remeros	(Uruguay) Martín López	(Uruguay) Romina Giossa	Tauro
Tabaré	(Uruguay) Santiago Rodríguez	(Uruguay) Matilde Talamas	
Urunday Universitario	(Uruguay) Mauricio González	(Uruguay) Gabriela Píriz	
Yale	(Uruguay) Gino Alderete	(Uruguay) Cinthia Mott	Starbade

=== Managerial changes ===
Team	Outgoing manager	Position in table	Manner of departure	Date of vacancy	Replaced with	Date of appointment
Hebraica y Macabi	(Uruguay) Luis Pierri	Pre-season	Resigned	28 December 2023	(Uruguay) Nélson Da Roza	30 January 2024
Aguada	(Uruguay) Nicolás Altalef	Pre-season	Signed by Olimpia	2 January 2024	(Uruguay) Victoria Pereyra	9 January 2024
Yale	(Uruguay) Gerardo Gonález	Pre-season	End of contract	17 January 2024	(Uruguay) Gino Alderete	17 January 2024
Juventud	(Uruguay) Humberto Sánchez	Pre-season	Sacked	29 January 2024	(Uruguay) Ignacio D'Angelo	29 January 2024
Juventud	(Uruguay) Ignacio D'Angelo	1–0 in Copa de Plata semi-finals (12–7)	Sacked	3 October 2024	(Uruguay) Sergio Castello	3 October 2024

== Torneo Clasificatorio ==
The Torneo Clasificatorio (Qualifying Tournament) was the first stage of the LFB. The clubs played each other once, and the first six of the table played in the Serie 1. The last six played the Serie 2.

=== League table ===
Pos	Team	Pld	W	L	PF	PA	PD	Pts	Qualification
1	Malvín	10	10	0	683	422	+261	20	Qualification to Serie 1
2	Defensor Sporting	10	8	2	733	511	+222	18 (Note: Defensor Sporting 1–0 Yale)	Qualification to Serie 1
3	Yale	10	8	2	737	546	+191	18	Qualification to Serie 1
4	Aguada	10	7	3	724	507	+217	17	Qualification to Serie 1
5	Remeros	10	5	5	563	588	−25	15 (Note: Remeros 1–0 Urupan)	Qualification to Serie 1
6	Urunday Universitario	10	5	5	549	635	−86	15	Qualification to Serie 1
7	25 de Agosto	10	4	6	564	639	−75	14 (Note: 25 de Agosto 1–0 Juventud)	Qualficiation to Serie 2
8	Juventud	10	4	6	646	636	+10	14	Qualficiation to Serie 2
9	Lagomar	10	3	7	620	681	−61	13	Qualficiation to Serie 2
10	Tabaré	10	1	9	496	701	−205	11	Qualficiation to Serie 2
11	Hebraica y Macabi	8	0	8	257	706	−449	8	Qualficiation to Serie 2

Source: FUBB
Rules for classification: 1) Win–loss record; 2) Head–to–head record; 3) Head–to–head point difference; 4) Point difference; 5) Points scored; 6) Sum of quotients of points scored

=== Results ===
Home \ Away	25A	AGU	DSC	HYM	JLP	LAG	MAL	REM	TAB	UUN	YAL
25 de Agosto				73–31	57–54		48–88		68–51		53–75
Aguada	76–47					68–44	57–65	75–48		58–59	
Defensor Sporting	71–52	81–84				88–65		83–59		63–45	
Hebraica y Macabi		14–107	19–85		43–102	50–74		0–20 (Note: Hebraica y Macabi lost by forfeit)			
Juventud		52–84	38–58			68–76		72–59		87–49	
Lagomar	53–55						52–80	67–72	78–53	48–53	
Malvín			61–51	20–0	75–37				94–37		70–51
Remeros	68–55						39–55		68–52	71–57	59–72
Tabaré		43–75	31–81	77–36	60–65						42–79
Urunday Universitario	72–56			62–33			50–75		57–50		45–94
Yale		54–40	57–72	86–31	75–71	94–63					

Source: FUBB
Legend: Blue = home team win; Red = away team win.

== Serie 1 ==
The Series 1 is a phase where the top-six teams of the Torneo Clasificatorio define their qualification for the two cups in dispute. The clubs play each other twice, home and away.

=== League table ===
Pos	Team	Pld	W	L	PF	PA	PD	Pts	Qualification
1	Malvín	10	8	2	730	615	+115	18 (Note: Malvín 2–2, +8; Aguada 2–2, +1; Yale 2–2 –9)	Qualification to Copa de Oro
2	Aguada	10	8	2	728	624	+104	18	Qualification to Copa de Oro
3	Yale	10	8	2	765	656	+109	18	Qualification to Copa de Oro
4	Defensor Sporting	10	4	6	721	675	+46	14	Qualification to Copa de Oro
5	Remeros	10	2	8	567	690	−123	12	Qualification to Copa de Plata
6	Urunday Universitario	10	0	10	531	782	−251	10	Qualification to Copa de Plata

Source: FUBB
Rules for classification: 1) Win–loss record; 2) Head–to–head record; 3) Head–to–head point difference; 4) Point difference; 5) Points scored; 6) Sum of quotients of points scored

=== Results ===
Home \ Away	AGU	DSC	MAL	REM	UUN	YAL
Aguada	—	85–74	75–67	80–52	86–59	56–67
Defensor Sporting	64–69	—	63–70	83–45	82–46	82–90
Malvín	63–59	80–75	—	65–61	75–58	69–56
Remeros	51–64	51–57	48–79	—	86–64	56–66
Urunday Universitario	52–71	59–70	34–77 (Note: The match was suspended at the end of the third quarter due to the scoreboard being broken. By mutual agreement between the teams, the match was declared finish, with the score they had at the time of suspension.)	54–68	—	40–73
Yale	75–83	80–71	86–85	78–49	94–65	—

Source: FUBB
Legend: Blue = home team win; Red = away team win.

== Serie 2 ==
The Serie 2 is a phase where the last five teams of the Torneo Clasificatorio define the two remaining spots for the Copa de Plata. The clubs play each other twice, home and away.

=== League table ===
Pos	Team	Pld	W	L	PF	PA	PD	Pts	Qualification or relegation
1	Juventud	8	7	1	547	428	+119	15	Qualification to Copa de Plata
2	Lagomar	8	6	2	553	408	+145	14	Qualification to Copa de Plata
3	25 de Agosto	8	5	3	553	389	+164	13	
4	Tabaré	8	2	6	434	499	−65	10	
5	Hebraica y Macabi	8	0	8	278	641	−363	8	

Source: FUBB
Rules for classification: 1) Win–loss record; 2) Head–to–head record; 3) Head–to–head point difference; 4) Point difference; 5) Points scored; 6) Sum of quotients of points scored

=== Results ===
Home \ Away	25A	HYM	JLP	LAG	TAB
25 de Agosto	—	100–24	53–77	64–53	55–41
Hebraica y Macabi	30–106	—	40–76	50–78	39–80
Juventud	66–52	67–32	—	60–56	79–71
Lagomar	52–50	85–36	77–48	—	77–48
Tabaré	46–73	49–27	47–74	52–75	—

Source: FUBB
Legend: Blue = home team win; Red = away team win.

== Copa de Plata ==
The Copa de Plata (Silver Cup) is a tournament played to order the teams from fifth to eighth place, with one cup in dispute.

Lagomar was the defending champion (having won the last two editions of this tournament), but was eliminated in the semi-finals, in three games, against Remeros.

Juventud was the champion, obtaining its first title after defeating Remeros in the third match, in Nueva Helvecia

As Remeros reached the final, due to the distance between the teams, the final will be best of three.

Due to injuries, Urunday Universitario decided not to play the match for third place, leaving the definition of the positions ordered by the result of the regular phase.

Semi-finals
5S1	Remeros	76	66	70	2
2S2	Lagomar	60	79	64	1
6S1	Urunday Universitario	52	59	0
1S2	Juventud	69	71	2

Finals
5S1	Remeros	70	51	67	1
1S2	Juventud	52	61	72	2

Source: FUBB

== Copa de Oro ==
The Copa de Oro (Gold Cup) is the LFB playoff to determinate the champion of the season.

By mutual agreement between the clubs, the match for third place was not played.

Semi-finals	Finals
1	Malvín	61	59	0
4	Defensor Sporting	66	75	2
4	Defensor Sporting	66	65	59	3
3	Yale	62	51	50	0
2	Aguada	67	80	0
3	Yale	70	83	2

Source: FUBB

== Final standings ==
Pos	Team	Pld	W	L	Seed	Qualification or relegation
Champion
1	Defensor Sporting	25	17	8	4	Qualification to Women's Basketball League Americas
Runners-up
2	Yale	25	18	7	3	Qualification to Liga Sudamericana de Baloncesto Femenino
Eliminated in semi-finals
3	Malvín	22	18	4	1	
4	Aguada	22	15	7	2	
Copa de Plata winner
5	Juventud	23	15	8	7	
Copa de Plata runner-up
6	Remeros	26	10	16	5	
Eliminated in Copa de Plata semi-finals
7	Urunday Universitario	22	5	17	6	
8	Lagomar	21	10	11	8	
Eliminated at Serie 2
9	25 de Agosto	18	9	9	9	
10	Tabaré	18	3	16	10	
11	Hebraica y Macabi	18	0	18	11	

== Statistical leaders ==
=== Points ===
Pos	Player	Club	PPG
1	(Chile) Javiera Campos	Defensor Sporting	21.2
2	(Argentina) Florencia Fernández	Aguada	19.3
3	(Uruguay) Josefina Zeballos	Defensor Sporting	18.3
4	(Brazil) Maria Carolina	Aguada	17.8
5	(Argentina) Agustina Bazán	Yale	17.6

=== Rebounds ===
Pos	Player	Club	RPG
1	(Argentina) Florencia Fernández	Aguada	16.5
2	(Uruguay) Sabrina Molina	Juventud	14.7
3	(Uruguay) Agostina Nogueira	Hebraica y Macabi	13.4
4	(Argentina) Debora Coli	25 de Agosto	13.1
5	(Brazil) Maria Carolina	Aguada	13.0

=== Assists ===
Pos	Player	Club	APG
1	(Uruguay) Carolina Fernández	Malvín	6.4
2	(Uruguay) Sabrina Molina	Juventud	5.6
3	(Paraguay) Constanza López	Juventud	5.0
4	(Argentina) Rocío Bereilh	25 de Agosto	5.0
5	(Argentina) Sofía Wolf	Aguada	5.0

=== Blocks ===
Pos	Player	Club	BPG
1	(Argentina) Florencia Fernández	Aguada	2.8
2	(Uruguay) Sabrina Molina	Juventud	2.2
3	(Uruguay) Agostina Nogueira	Hebraica y Macabi	1.8
4	(Uruguay) Florencia Sergio	Lagomar	1.3
5	(Argentina) Julia Fernández	Aguada	1.3

Source: FUBB

== Awards ==
All official awards of the 2024 LFB season.

=== MVP ===
Pos.	Player	Team
SF	(Uruguay) Krystal Cordara	Defensor Sporting

=== Foreign MVP ===
Pos.	Player	Team
PG	(Chile) Javiera Campos	Defensor Sporting

=== Top-scorer ===
Pos.	Player	Team
PF	(Argentina) Agustina Bazán	Yale

=== Best rebounder ===
Pos.	Player	Team
C	(Uruguay) Sabrina Molina	Juventud

=== Most Improved Player ===
Pos.	Player	Team
C	(Uruguay) Lara Barbato	Yale

== LFB clubs in international competitions ==
Women's Basketball League Americas
Team	Progress	Result	W–L
Malvín	Group A	4th of 4 teams (0–3)	0–3

Liga Sudamericana de Baloncesto Femenino
Team	Progress	Result	W–L
Aguada	Final	Loss vs. (Brazilian Basketball Confederation) SESI Araraquara	3–2
Aguada	Semi-finals	Win vs. (Paraguayan Basketball Federation) Félix Pérez Cardozo	3–2
Aguada	Group B	2nd of 4 teams (2–1)	3–2
