= 2023 Liga Femenina de Básquetbol season =

Spanish professional basketball season

Liga Femenina de Básquetbol
- Season: 2023
- Dates: 22 April 2023 – 16 October 2024
- Games played: 104
- Teams: 10

Regular season
- Top seed: Malvín
- Season MVP: (Uruguay) Josefina Zeballos

Finals
- Champions: Malvín; 5th title 22nd Uruguayan title
- Runners-up: Aguada
- Semi-finalists: Defensor Sporting; Yale

Statistical leaders
Points	(Uruguay) Florencia Spinelli	21.5
Rebounds	(Uruguay) Sabrina Molina	14.3
Assists	(Uruguay) Carolina Fernández	5.7

Records
- Biggest home win: Aguada 109–41 Juventud (22 April 2024)
- Biggest away win: Urunday Universitario 32–119 Malvín (23 April 2024)
- Highest scoring: Aguada 93–73 Yale (12 August 2024)
- Winning streak: 12 games Malvín
- Losing streak: 15 games Juventud

The 2023 Liga Femenina de Básquetbol season, was the 8th season of the top Uruguayan female basketball league, since its establishment in 2016. It started on 22 April 2024, with the match between Aguada and Juventud for the regular season, and ended on 16 October 2024, with the game 5 of the finals.

Malvín was the defending and repeated by beating Aguada again in five games. The title marked the retirement of two club legends: the captain, Florencia Somma, and Sabina Bello.

== Teams ==
A total of 10 teams contested the league, all from the 2022 season. Montevideo and Deportivo Paysandú decided not to participate again.

=== Venues and locations ===
Location of teams in 2023 LFB
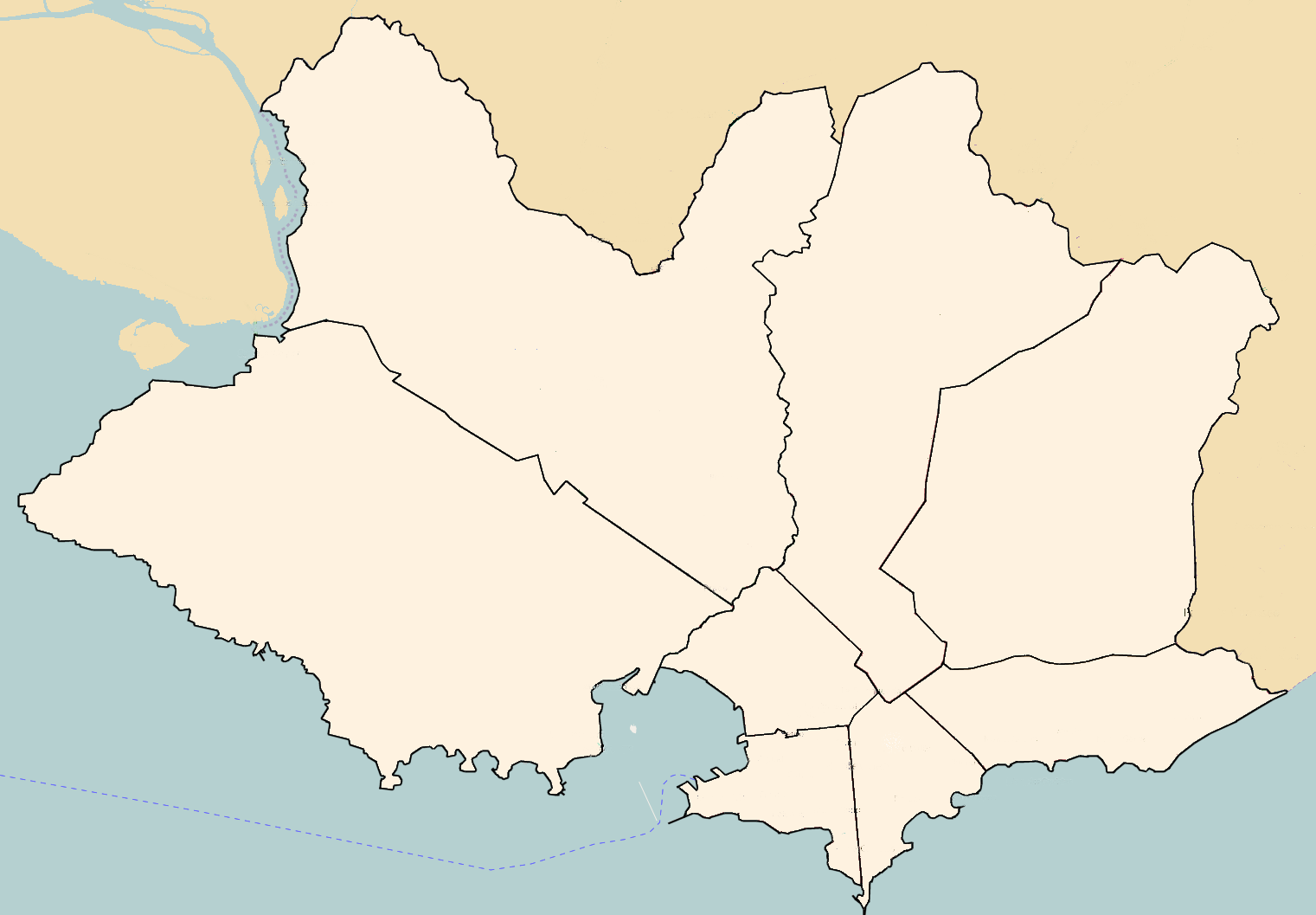
Location of teams from the Montevideo in 2023 LFB

Team	Home City	Arena	Capacity
25 de Agosto	Montevideo	Gimnasio 25 de Agosto	350
Aguada	Montevideo	Estadio Propio Aguatero	3,738
Defensor Sporting	Montevideo	Gimasio Defensor Sporting	150
Hebraica Macabi	Montevideo	Gimnasio Hebraica y Macabi	50
Juventud	Las Piedras	Estadio Federal Cirilio Malnatti	1,000
Lagomar	Ciudad de la Costa	Gimnasio Lagomar	170
Malvín	Montevideo	Gimnasio Juan Francisco Canil	900
Remeros	Mercedes	Gimnasio Agrimensor Mario Eduardo Bellini	400
Urunday Universitario	Montevideo	Gimnasio Cr. Osvaldo Dohir	700
Yale	Montevideo	Campo de Deportes Luis Ruocco	500

=== Personnel and sponsorship ===
Team	Head coach	Captain	Kit manufacturer
25 de Agosto	(Uruguay) Brian Neira	(Uruguay) Rossana Dagnino	Sporty's
Aguada	(Uruguay) Nicolás Altalef	(Uruguay) Camila Kirschenbaum	Puma
Defensor Sporting	(Uruguay) Fabián Boscardin	(Uruguay) Joaquina Gregorio	Concreto
Hebraica y Macabi	(Uruguay) Luis Pierri	(Uruguay) Abril Mieres	Elite
Juventud	(Uruguay) Humberto Sánchez	(Uruguay) Karina Acosta	1935
Lagomar	(Uruguay) Diego Castrillón	(Uruguay) Sabrina Schiaffarino	Kova
Malvín	(Uruguay) Juan Pablo Serdio	(Uruguay) Florencia Somma	Xu Sports
Remeros	(Uruguay) Martín López	(Argentina) Melina Zapata	Tauro
Urunday Universitario	(Uruguay) Mauricio González	(Uruguay) Antonella Ormando	Giova
Yale	(Uruguay) Gerardo González	(Uruguay) Cinthia Mott	T-shirt

=== Managerial changes ===
Team	Outgoing manager	Position in table	Manner of departure	Date of vacancy	Replaced with	Date of appointment
Defensor Sporting	(Uruguay) Gino Alderete	Pre-season	Sacked	26 December 2022	(Uruguay) Fabián Boscardin	7 March 2023
Yale	(Uruguay) Rodrigo Briñon	Pre-season	Sacked	8 February 2023	(Uruguay) Gerardo González	8 February 2023
Lagomar	(Uruguay) Jhonatan Viazzo	8th (0–1)	Sacked	28 April 2023	(Uruguay) Juan Ignacio Vallarino (interim)	29 April 2023
Lagomar	(Uruguay) Juan Ignacio Vallarino (interim)	6th (1–1)	End of interim period	5 May 2023	(Uruguay) Diego Castrillón	5 May 2024
25 de Agosto	(Uruguay) Juan Manuel Loureiro	0–1 in Copa de Plata semi-finals (7–13)	Resigned	25 September 2024	(Uruguay) Brian Neira	25 September 2024

== Torneo Clasificatorio ==
The Torneo Classificatorio (Qualifying Tournament) was the first stage of the LFB. The clubs played each other once, and the first six of the table played in the Serie 1. The last six played the Serie 2.

=== League table ===
Pos	Team	Pld	W	L	PF	PA	PD	Pts	Qualification
1	Malvín	9	8	1	692	447	+245	17	Qualification to Serie 1
2	Defensor Sporting	9	7	2	639	505	+134	16 (Note: Defensor Sporting 2–0, Aguada 1–1, Hebraica y Macabi 0–2)	Qualification to Serie 1
3	Aguada	9	7	2	726	469	+257	16	Qualification to Serie 1
4	Hebraica y Macabi	9	7	2	600	461	+139	16	Qualification to Serie 1
5	25 de Agosto	9	5	4	594	594	0	14	Qualification to Serie 1
6	Yale	9	4	5	543	567	−24	13	Qualification to Serie 1
7	Lagomar	9	3	6	573	656	−83	12	Qualficiation to Serie 2
8	Remeros	9	2	7	465	571	−106	11 (Note: Remeros 1–0 Urunday Universitario)	Qualficiation to Serie 2
9	Urunday Universitario	9	2	7	404	665	−261	11	Qualficiation to Serie 2
10	Juventud	9	0	9	426	727	−301	9	Qualficiation to Serie 2

Source: FUBB
Rules for classification: 1) Win–loss record; 2) Head–to–head record; 3) Head–to–head point difference; 4) Point difference; 5) Points scored; 6) Sum of quotients of points scored

=== Results ===
Home \ Away	25A	AGU	DSC	HYM	JLP	LAG	MAL	REM	UUN	YAL
25 de Agosto				57–58		74–70	49–73		58–43	
Aguada	84–77		54–60		109–41	91–61	58–78			
Defensor Sporting	78–58			73–64		85–61			82–46	
Hebraica y Macabi		47–59				89–58	60–55	62–38		62–43
Juventud	49–76		46–84	40–69					43–60	
Lagomar					83–59		49–79	65–50		61–60
Malvín			62–50		90–38			71–51		66–60
Remeros	60–62	25–84	50–79		76–54				62–38	
Urunday Universitario		36–90		38–89		70–65	32–119			41–57
Yale	79–83	44–97	64–48		80–56			56–53		

Source: FUBB
Legend: Blue = home team win; Red = away team win.

== Serie 1 ==
The Series 1 is a phase where the top-six teams of the Torneo Classificatorio define their qualification for the two cups in dispute. The clubs play each other twice, home and away.

=== League table ===
Pos	Team	Pld	W	L	PF	PA	PD	Pts	Qualification
1	Malvín	10	9	1	725	580	+145	19	Qualification to Copa de Oro
2	Aguada	10	7	3	689	637	+52	17	Qualification to Copa de Oro
3	Defensor Sporting	10	5	5	649	642	+7	15 (Note: Defensor Sporting 2–0 Yale)	Qualification to Copa de Oro
4	Yale	10	5	5	619	639	−20	15	Qualification to Copa de Oro
5	Hebraica y Macabi	10	2	8	529	640	−111	12 (Note: Hebraica y Macabi 122–119 25 de Agosto)	Qualification to Copa de Plata
6	25 de Agosto	10	2	8	591	664	−73	12	Qualification to Copa de Plata

Source: FUBB
Rules for classification: 1) Win–loss record; 2) Head–to–head record; 3) Head–to–head point difference; 4) Point difference; 5) Points scored; 6) Sum of quotients of points scored

=== Results ===
Home \ Away	25A	AGU	DSC	HYM	MAL	YAL
25 de Agosto	—	57–63	54–60	49–59	71–80	62–59
Aguada	70–47	—	67–58	72–47	56–83	93–73
Defensor Sporting	73–55	76–83	—	70–59	58–77	62–45
Hebraica y Macabi	63–70	58–67	61–55	—		
Malvín	68–59	73–57	74–66	70–54	—	78–53
Yale	69–67	65–61	67–71	58–44	68–55	—

Source: FUBB
Legend: Blue = home team win; Red = away team win.

== Serie 2 ==
The Serie 2 is a phase where the last five teams of the Torneo Classificatorio define the two remaining spots for the Copa de Plata. The clubs play each other twice, home and away.

=== League table ===
Pos	Team	Pld	W	L	PF	PA	PD	Pts	Qualification or relegation
1	Lagomar	6	6	0	424	214	+210	12	Qualification to Copa de Plata
2	Remeros	6	4	2	298	319	−21	10	Qualification to Copa de Plata
3	Urunday Universitario	6	2	4	334	359	−25	8	
4	Juventud	6	0	6	260	424	−164	6	

Source: FUBB
Rules for classification: 1) Win–loss record; 2) Head–to–head record; 3) Head–to–head point difference; 4) Point difference; 5) Points scored; 6) Sum of quotients of points scored

=== Results ===
Home \ Away	JLP	LAG	REM	UUN
Juventud	—	35–73	46–60	39–65
Lagomar	101–45	—	20–0 (Note: Remeros originally won the match 61–54, but lost the point due to the incorrect registration of Melina Zapata.)	64–51
Remeros	63–45	45–90	—	65–60
Urunday Universitario	62–50	38–76	58–65	—

Source: FUBB
Legend: Blue = home team win; Red = away team win.

== Copa de Plata ==
The Copa de Plata (Silver Cup) is a tournament played to order the teams from fifth to eighth place, with one cup in dispute.

Lagomar was the defending champion and repeated by sweeping Hebraica y Macabi in the finals.

Due to the distance between the teams, the match for third place was not played, leaving the definition of the positions ordered by the result of the regular season.

Semi-finals
5S1	Hebraica y Macabi	43	62	2
2S2	Remeros	40	37	0
6S1	25 de Agosto	67	50	0
1S2	Lagomar	74	51	2

Finals
5S1	Hebraica y Macabi	57	40	55	0
1S2	Lagomar	64	69	69	3

Source: FUBB

== Copa de Oro ==
The Copa de Oro (Gold Cup) is the LFB playoff to determinate the champion of the season.

Semi-finals
1	Malvín	82	61	2
4	Yale	36	45	0
2	Aguada	79	75	2
3	Defensor Sporting	58	62	0

Finals
1	Malvín	79	64	62	61	51	3
2	Aguada	72	82	61	76	48	2
Third place match
4	Yale	73
3	Defensor Sporting	53

Source: FUBB

== Final standings ==
Pos	Team	Pld	W	L	Seed	Qualification or relegation
Champion
1	Malvín	26	22	4	1	Qualification to Women's Basketball League Americas
Runners-up
2	Aguada	26	18	8	2	Qualification to Liga Sudamericana de Baloncesto Femenino
Copa de Oro third place match winner
3	Yale	22	10	12	4	
Copa de Oro third place match loser
4	Defensor Sporting	22	12	10	3	
Copa de Plata winner
5	Lagomar	20	14	6	7	
Copa de Plata runner-up
6	Hebraica y Macabi	24	11	13	5	
Eliminated in Copa de Plata semi-finals
7	25 de Agosto	21	7	14	6	
8	Remeros	17	6	11	8	
Eliminated at Serie 2
9	Urunday Universitario	15	4	11	9	
10	Juventud	15	0	15	10	

== Statistical leaders ==
=== Points ===
Pos	Player	Club	PPG
1	(Uruguay) Florencia Spinelli	Juventud	21.5
2	(Uruguay) Camila Kirschenbaum	Aguada	20.0
3	(Uruguay) Karina Acosta	Juventud	17.9
4	(Argentina) Candela Foresto	25 de Agosto	16.2
5	(Argentina) Julieta Sienra	Yale	15.2

=== Rebounds ===
Pos	Player	Club	RPG
1	(Uruguay) Sabrina Molina	25 de Agosto	14.3
2	(Argentina) Agustina Jourdheuil	Malvín	10.0
3	(Argentina) Agustina Bazán	Yale	10.0
4	(Uruguay) Selena Medrick	Lagomar	9.7
5	(Paraguay) Beatriz Quevedo	Lagomar	9.7

=== Assists ===
Pos	Player	Club	APG
1	(Uruguay) Carolina Fernández	Malvín	5.7
2	(Argentina) Candela Foresto	25 de Agosto	5.6
3	(Argentina) Agustina Bazán	Yale	5.5
4	(Argentina) Melina Marcial	Lagomar	5.4
5	(Uruguay) Romina D'Alesandro	Hebraica y Macabi	4.6

=== Blocks ===
Pos	Player	Club	BPG
1	(Paraguay) Beatriz Quevedo	Lagomar	1.8
2	(Uruguay) Florencia Barbier	Urunday U.	1.6
3	(Uruguay) Sabrina Molina	25 de Agosto	1.5
4	(Argentina) Ornela Bacchini	Defensor Sporting	1.3
5	(Uruguay) Karina Acosta	Juventud	1.3

Source: FUBB

== Awards ==
All official awards of the 2024 LFB season.

=== MVP ===
Pos.	Player	Team
PG	(Uruguay) Josefina Zeballos	Aguada

=== Foreign MVP ===
Pos.	Player	Team
C	(Argentina) Carla Miculka	Malvín

== LFB clubs in international competitions ==
Women's Basketball League Americas
Team	Progress	Result	W–L
Malvín	Final	Loss vs. (Federación Colombiana de Baloncesto) Indeportes Antioquia	3–2
Malvín	Semi-finals	Win vs. (Asociación Deportiva Mexicana de Básquetbol) Centauros de Chihuahua	3–2
Malvín	Group B	1st of 4 teams (2–1)	3–2

Liga Sudamericana de Baloncesto Femenino
Team	Progress	Result	W–L
Aguada	Final	Loss vs. (Federación Colombiana de Baloncesto) Indeportes Antioquia	3–2
Aguada	Semi-finals	Win vs. (Federación Colombiana de Baloncesto) Búcaros	3–2
Aguada	Group A	2nd of 4 teams (2–1)	3–2
