= Liga Femenina de Básquetbol =

Most important basketball league in Uruguay

- First season: 2016
- Country: Uruguay
- Confederation: FIBA Americas
- Number of teams: 9
- Level on pyramid: 1
- International cup(s): Women's Basketball League Americas; Liga Sudamericana de Baloncesto Femenino
- Current champions: Malvín (6th title) (2026)
- Most championships: Malvín (6 titles)
- President: (Uruguay) Gloria Danners
- TV partners: Tenfield
- Website: www.fubb.org.uy
- 2025 Liga Femenina de Básquetbol season

The Liga Femenina de Básquetbol (abbreviated as LFB; English: Women's Basketball League) is the most important club basketball league in Uruguay. It is organized by the Uruguayan Basketball Federation (FUBB). The competition began in 2016, under the name of Liga Uruguaya Femenina (English: Uruguayan Women's League) replacing the Torneo Metropolitano Femenino (English: Women's Metropolitan Tournament) after the incorporation of the first team outside Montevideo, Unión Ciclista Maragata from San José.

The first LFB was won by Malvín, which adding their Metropolitan titles, stretched its streak to 14 consecutive championships, by defeating Goes, which arrived undefeated, to the finals.

== Format ==
The LFB is currently played in three stages: Torneo Clasificatorio (Qualifying Tournament), the Series (1 or 2) and play-off.

- In the Qualifying Tournament, the clubs play each other once, and the first five of the table play in the Serie 1 and the last four play the Serie 2.
- In the Series the clubs play each other twice, home and away, carrying over the points from the Qualifying Tournament. In the Serie 1, play the quarterfinals, with the best three of the Serie 2.
- Finally, teams competed in the playoffs with series being best of three. The first stage was the quarterfinals and are played as: A) 1st of Serie 1 vs. 2nd of Serie 2, B) 2nd of Serie 1 vs. 1st of Serie 2, C) 3rd of Serie 1 vs. 6th of Serie 1, D) 4th of Serie 1 vs. 5th of Serie 2. The winners of these matches played in the semifinals in best-of-five serie as: A) Winner vs. D) Winner, and B) winner vs. C) winner. The winners of these matches played in the finals in best-of-five serie, with the winner being crowned as the league champions of the LFB. The losers of the quarterfinals play the semifinals of the Copa de Plata, in best-of-three serie as: A) Loser vs. B) Loser, and C) Loser vs. D) Loser. The winners of these matches played in the finals in best-of-three serie, with the winner being the cup champion.
- The LFB champion will play the Women's Basketball League Americas and the runner-up, the Liga Sudamericana de Baloncesto Femenino.

== Participating teams ==
=== 2026 season teams ===
Notes: All statistics are only for the Women's Basketball League (Liga Femenina de Básquetbol). Torneo Metropolitano Femenino are not included. The "arena" column reflects the arena where the team plays most of its home games, but does not indicate that the team in question is the owner.

Club	City	Arena	Capacity	Foundation	Seasons	Championships
25 de Agosto	Montevideo	Gimnasio 25 de Agosto	350	1948	8	0
Aguada	Montevideo	Estadio Propio Aguatero	3,738	1922	10	0
Cordón	Montevideo	Estadio Julio C. Zito Barrella	750	1944	6	0
Defensor Sporting	Montevideo	Gimasio Defensor Sporting	150	1910	10	4
Lagomar	Ciudad de la Costa	Gimnasio Lagomar	170	1956	6	0
Malvín	Montevideo	Gimnasio Juan Francisco Canil	900	1938	11	5
Tabaré	Montevideo	Gimnasio Tabaré	1,100	1931	3	0
Urunday Universitario	Montevideo	Gimnasio Cr. Osvaldo Dohir	700	1931	6	0
Yale	Montevideo	Campo de Deportes Luis Ruocco	500	1940	7	0

== Champions by season ==
Season	Champion	Result	Runner-up	MVP	Champion Coach
2016	Malvín	2–0	Goes		(Uruguay) Enrique Parrella
2017	Malvín	2–0	Defensor Sporting		(Uruguay) Juan Pablo Serdio
2018	Bohemios	2–1	Malvín		(Uruguay) Enrique Berhouet
2019	Malvín	2–1	Defensor Sporting	(Uruguay) Emilia Larre Borges	(Uruguay) Juan Pablo Serdio
2020	Defensor Sporting	2–0	Malvín	(Uruguay) Aldana Gayoso	(Uruguay) Gino Alderete
2021	Defensor Sporting	2–0	Hebraica Macabi	(Uruguay) Josefina Rivera	(Uruguay) Gino Alderete
2022	Malvín	3–2	Aguada	(Uruguay) Carolina Fernández	(Uruguay) Juan Pablo Serdio
2023	Malvín	3–2	Aguada	(Uruguay) Josefina Zeballos	(Uruguay) Juan Pablo Serdio
2024	Defensor Sporting	3–0	Yale	(Uruguay) Krystal Cordara	(Uruguay) Fabián Boscardín
2025	Defensor Sporting	3–1	Malvín	(Uruguay) Josefina Rivera	(Uruguay) Fabián Boscardín
2026	Malvín	3–2	Defensor Sporting	(Uruguay) Carolina Fernández	(Uruguay) Juan Pablo Serdio

== Total LFB titles by club ==
Club	Championships	Runners-up	Year(s) won
Malvín	6	3	2016, 2017, 2019, 2022, 2023, 2026
Defensor Sporting	4	3	2020, 2021, 2024, 2025
Bohemios	1	0	2018
Aguada	0	2	
Yale	0	1	
Hebraica Macabi	0	1	
Goes	0	1	

== See also ==
- Liga Uruguaya de Basketball
- Uruguayan Basketball Champions
- Uruguayan Basketball Federation (FUBB)
