= Pontvianne =

Pontvianne is a last name. Notable people with this last name include:

- Jean Pontvianne, ordinary (1877–1879) of the Roman Catholic Archdiocese of Huế in Vietnam
- Jean-Marc Pontvianne (born 1984), French triple jumper
- Julien Pontvianne, French saxophonist leading the sextet Abhra, playing along with Lauren Kinsella
- Rico Pontvianne (1943–2018), Mexican Olympic basketball player
