= 2019–20 Moldovan National Division (basketball) =

- Season: 2019–20
- Duration: 24 November 2019 – May 2020
- Teams: 6

The 2019–20 Moldovan National Division season, is the 29th season of the top basketball league in Moldova.

== Competition format ==
Six teams joined the regular season, played as a double-legged round-robin tournament. The four best qualified teams joined the playoffs, that would be played in a best-of-five format.

== Teams ==
Team	City
Basco	Bălți
Ceadîr	Ceadîr-Lunga
Gama-Sind	Cahul
Olimp	Sîngerei
Soroca	Soroca
Speranta	Chișinău

== Regular season ==
=== League table ===
Pos	Team	Pld	W	L	PF	PA	PD	Pts	Qualification
1	Gama-Sind	6	6	0	462	317	+145	12	Qualification to the playoffs
2	Basco	6	5	1	538	453	+85	11	Qualification to the playoffs
3	Olimp	5	3	2	409	335	+74	8	Qualification to the playoffs
4	Soroca	6	2	4	455	521	−66	8	Qualification to the playoffs
5	Ceadîr	7	2	5	494	617	−123	9	
6	Sperante	6	0	6	414	529	−115	6	

Updated to match(es) played on 8 March 2020. Source:

=== Results ===
Home \ Away	BAS	CEA	GAM	OLI	SOR	SPE
Basco	—	107–75	62–77			90–69
Ceadîr	69–97	—			87–52	
Gama-Sind		115–60	—	20–0	76–54	82–72
Olimp	76–87	100–78		—		
Soroca	87–95	87–52		86–130	—	
Sperante		59–73	69–92	64–103	81–89	—

Updated to match(es) played on 8 March 2020. Source:
Legend: Blue = home team win; Red = away team win.
