= Ulhas Koravi Satyanarayan =

Indian professional basketball player

No. 24 – Novi Pazar
- Position: Guard
- League: Basketball League of Serbia

Personal information
- Born: 15 August 1998 (age 28) Tamil Nadu
- Listed height: 1.85 m (6 ft 1 in)

Career information
- High school: G D Goenka Public School
- College: University of Westminster (2016-19)

Career history
- 2019–2021: Old School Ballers
- 2021–2022: Gloria
- 2023–2024: Valletta Fighters
- 2024–present: Novi Pazar

Career highlights
- 1x gold medal - Indian under-19 national school league; 1x bronze medal Delhi Open league; 1× champion - London inter-university league (2018); 1× champion - India Street Ball League (2019); 1x bronze medal - Moldovan Super League (2021)

Ulhas Koravi Satyanarayan, mostly referred to as Ulhas KS (born 15 August 1998), is an Indian professional basketball player.

NDTV, India TV, and The Indian Express have described him as the first Indian to sign and compete in professional basketball leagues in Europe, including the Moldovan National League Division 1 and the Serbian National Basketball League Division 1 (KLS).

He has competed professionally in Moldova, Malta, and Serbia, and has represented India in international basketball competitions. He is also the Founder and President of the Ulhas YuviPep Basketball Academy (UYBA), a grassroots basketball initiative focused on player development and international exposure.

== Early life ==
He is originally from Kancheepuram in Tamil Nadu. He started basketball at age 7.

== Basketball career ==
Ulhas hails from G D Goenka Public School, New Delhi. He played in the Under-19 national school league and Delhi Open league, winning gold and bronze in the two tournaments.

In 2016, he joined Westminster Business School (WBS) in Marylebone, Central London. He was selected to the university's first team and served as team captain during the 2017–18 season, leading the Westminster Dragons to their first university championship in seven years.

In his 3rd year in England he played in the National Basketball League.

After graduation from Westminster, Ulhas played in a semi-professional 3x3 basketball league 3BL in India. There, he played for New Delhi's team Old School Ballers and won the 2019 championship.

In mid-2021, he started his fully professional career with Gloria of the Moldovan National Division.

As of mid-December 2021 he was the league's second-best scorer. He helped his team Gloria secure the bronze medal at the 2021 Moldovan Super League, the first medal in the team's league history.

He later competed professionally in Malta before signing with Novi Pazar in the Basketball League of Serbia.

== Basketball development ==
Ulhas is the founder and president of the Ulhas YuviPep Basketball Academy (UYBA), a grassroots basketball development initiative focused on developing young players and creating international exposure pathways for Indian athletes.
