= South American Women's Basketball League =

Liga Sudamericana de Baloncesto Femenino
- Organising body: CONSUBASQUET
- First season: 1981
- Region: South America
- Confederation: FIBA Americas
- Number of teams: 8
- Level on pyramid: 2nd-tier women's league in South America
- Related competitions: Women's Basketball League Americas (1st tier)
- Current champions: (Brazil) SESI Araraquara (1st title) (2024)
- Most championships: (Brazil) Unimep (Brazil) BCN (3 titles each) (Note: Unimep merged with BCN to solve salary problems in 1987. Together they won two championships, but in 1990 BCN broke the sponsorship creating a new team, which later moved to Osasco. The media of the time relate the 1989 title as a three-time championship for Unimep, and also count the 1992 title as a three-time championship for BCN. That means, Unimep won the 1986 tournament as an independent team, both won the title as a merger in 1987 and 1989, and BCN won the championship as an independent team in 1992.)
- Website: Official website
- 2024 Liga Sudamericana de Baloncesto Femenino

The South American Women's Basketball League (Spanish: Liga Sudamericana de Baloncesto Femenino; Portuguese: Liga Sul-Americana de Basquetebol Feminino) is a South American competition of women's basketball clubs organized by CONSUBASQUET, which in 2009 took over and recreated the competition. It is the successor to the "South American Women's Club Championship" and the "South American Women's Club League".

== History ==
The championship began in 1981 and stopped being played in 1999, then an attempt was made to reissue it in 2002 without success, and it was played again from 2009 to 2015. The tournament was later relaunched in 2019.

There is a hegemony of the Brazilian teams, who dominated the competition, winning the first seventeen of the contests played.

The streak was breaking in 2019, when Sampaio was eliminated in the group stage, against Club Lums and Leonas de Riobamba from Ecuador. This tournament was won by colombian team, Copacabana de Antioquia.

The tournament began to be played every year in 2021, despite the suspension due to the COVID-19 pandemic.

Félix Pérez Cardozo gave the first title to Paraguay, when defeated Defensor Sporting, from Uruguay, in 2022 final.

After two editions, brazilian teams returned to the competition in 2024, taking back the crown, when SESI Araraquara was champion, defeating uruguayan, Aguada.

== Format ==
The 8 clubs were divided into two groups of four teams, each with a host.

The two best-placed clubs in each group qualified for the Final Four.

The Final Four were established according to the standings of each team in the groups. It is organized by one of the qualified clubs. The semi-finales were played in a single-match, like the third place game, and the final.

== Results ==
#	Year	Final host	Final			Third and fourth place			MVP
#	Year	Final host	Champion	Score	Runners-up	Third	Score	Fourth	MVP
Round Robin format
1	1981	(Peru); Lima	(Brazil); Higienópolis		(Peru); Bancoper	(Argentina); Newell's Old Boys		(Paraguay); Félix Pérez Cardozo	(Brazil); Hortência
2	1983	(Brazil); Presidente Prudente	(Brazil); Prudentina		(Brazil); Higienópolis	(Paraguay); Félix Pérez Cardozo		(Uruguay); Naga	
3	1984	(Brazil); Sorocaba	(Brazil); Prudentina		(Brazil); Minercal	(Colombia); Muebles Tony del Valle		(Paraguay); Félix Pérez Cardozo	(Brazil); Hortência
4	1986	(Argentina); Buenos Aires	(Brazil); Unimep		(Argentina); Platense	(Colombia); Drogas La Rebaja		(Chile); Brisas	
5	1987	(Ecuador); Quito	(Brazil); Unimep/BCN		(Colombia); Universidad Central	(Peru); Circolo Sportivo Italiano		(Ecuador); El Nacional	
6	1989	(Brazil); Piracicaba	(Brazil); Unimep/BCN		(Argentina); Provincial	(Ecuador); Emelec		(Bolivia); Blooming	
Finals and third place matches
7	1990	(Ecuador); Guayaquil	(Brazil); Divino	85–77	(Brazil); Unimep/BCN	(Chile); Colo-Colo	84–73	(Venezuela); Leonas	(Brazil); Janeth
8	1992 (I)	(Brazil); Guarujá	(Brazil); BCN	116–58	(Brazil); Divino	(Ecuador); Sport Uruguay	68–51	(Paraguay); Olimpia	
Round Robin format
9	1992 (II)	(Chile); Santiago	(Brazil); Araçatuba		(Brazil); Sorocaba	(Chile); Thomas Bata		(Bolivia); Maryknoll	
Finals and third place matches
10	1993	(Brazil); Campos do Jordão	(Brazil); Sorocaba	101–99	(Brazil); Araçatuba	Unknown			
11	1996	(Brazil); Jacareí	(Brazil); Sorocaba	91–76	(Argentina); Vélez Sarsfield	(Ecuador); UTE Quito	80–72	(Chile); Deportivo Tatio	
12	1998	(Brazil); Curitiba	(Brazil); Paraná		(Ecuador); UTE Quito	Unknown			
13	1999	(Brazil); Santo André	(Brazil); Santo André		(Brazil); Paraná	Unknown			
Final Four Round Robin format
14	2002	(Chile); Puerto Montt	(Brazil); Vasco da Gama		(Chile); Deportivo Maullín	(Ecuador); Sport Uruguay		(Bolivia); Economía	
Finals and third place matches
15	2009	(Ecuador); Quito	(Brazil); Ourinhos	102–77	(Ecuador); UTE Quito	(Colombia); Universidad de Medellín	76–63	(Argentina); Central Entrerriano	
16	2012	(Ecuador); Quito	(Brazil); Americana	82–67	(Brazil); Ourinhos	(Ecuador); UTE Quito	88–84	(Argentina); Lanús	
17	2014	(Ecuador); Quito	(Brazil); Sport Recife	83–82	(Colombia); La Estancia	(Ecuador); UTE Quito	99–88	(Argentina); Deportivo Berazategui	
18	2015	(Chile); Puente Alto	(Brazil); Unimed/Americana	70–60	(Ecuador); UTE Quito	(Chile); New Crusaders	80–51	(Argentina); Deportivo Berazategui	
Final Four Round Robin format
19	2019	(Argentina); Santiago del Estero	(Colombia); Copacabana de Antioquia		(Argentina); Quimsa	(Ecuador); Club Lums		(Ecuador); Leonas de Riobamba	
Finals and third place matches
-	2021	Curtailed and voided due to the COVID-19 pandemic.							
20	2022	(Uruguay); Paysandú	(Paraguay); Félix Pérez Cardozo	69–51	(Uruguay); Defensor Sporting	(Ecuador); Sportiva Bocca	48–46	(Argentina); Deportivo Berazategui	(Paraguay); Paola Ferrari
21	2023	(Argentina); Santiago del Estero	(Colombia); Indeportes Antioquia	82–69	(Uruguay); Aguada	(Colombia); Búcaros	74–50	(Argentina); Quimsa	(Colombia); Jennifer Muñoz
22	2024	(Paraguay); Luque	(Brazil); SESI Araraquara	87–69	(Uruguay); Aguada	(Argentina); Obras	75–71	(Paraguay); Félix Pérez Cardozo	(Brazil); Sossô

== Statistics ==
=== Medals by country ===
Rank	Nation	Gold	Silver	Bronze	Total
1	Brazil	19	8	0	27
2	Colombia	2	2	4	8
3	Paraguay	1	0	1	2
4	Argentina	0	4	2	6
5	Ecuador	0	3	8	11
6	Uruguay	0	3	0	3
7	Chile	0	1	3	4
8	Peru	0	1	1	2
Totals (8 entries)		22	22	19	63

=== Titles by club ===
Rank	Club	Winners	Runners-up
1	(Brazil) BCN	3	1
1	(Brazil) Unimep	3	1
2	(Brazil) Sorocaba	2	1
3	(Brazil) Prudentina	2	0
4	(Brazil) Ourinhos	1	1
4	(Brazil) Paraná	1	1
4	(Brazil) Araçatuba	1	1
4	(Brazil) Divino	1	1
4	(Brazil) Higienópolis	1	1
10	(Brazil) SESI Araraquara	1	0
10	(Colombia) Indeportes Antioquia	1	0
10	(Paraguay) Félix Pérez Cardozo	1	0
10	(Colombia) Copacabana de Antioquia	1	0
10	(Brazil) Unimed/Americana	1	0
10	(Brazil) Sport Recife	1	0
10	(Brazil) Americana	1	0
10	(Brazil) Vasco Da Gama	1	0
10	(Brazil) Santo André	1	0

== Stats leaders ==
Season	Top scorer	PPG	Top rebounder	RPG	Top assistant	APG
2021	(United States) Katrina Pardee	26.3	(Belarus) Tatyana Troina	11.7	(Venezuela) Waleska Pérez	5.0
2022	(Spain) Gala Mestres	20.4	(Argentina) Sabrina Scévola	14.0	(United States) Kiana Johnson	6.0
2023	(Colombia) Jennifer Muñoz	19.0	(Argentina) Mayra Leiva	9.7	(Argentina) Andrea Boquete	5.4
2024	(Argentina) Agustina Marín	22.6	(Argentina) Diana Cabrera	15.7	(Argentina) Diana Cabrera	4.3

== See also ==
=== Men's competitions ===
- Basketball Champions League Americas
- Liga Sudamericana de Baloncesto

=== Women's competitions ===
- Women's Basketball League Americas
