= 2024 Liga Sudamericana de Baloncesto Femenino =

Basketball league in South America for women's basketball clubs

Liga Sudamericana de Baloncesto Femenino
- Season: 2024
- Dates: Group Stage: 3–11 May; Final Four: 15–16 June
- Games played: 16
- Teams: 8 (from 8 countries)

Regular season
- Season MVP: (Brazil) Sossô (SESI Araraquara)

Finals
- Champions: (Brazil) SESI Araraquara (1st title)
- Runners-up: (Uruguay) Aguada
- Third place: (Argentina) Obras
- Fourth place: (Paraguay) Félix Pérez Cardozo

Statistical leaders
Points	(Argentina) Agustina Marín (Aguada)	22.6
Rebounds	(Argentina) Diana Cabrera (Tenis La Paz)	15.7
Assists	(Argentina) Diana Cabrera (Tenis La Paz)	4.3
Index Rating	(Argentina) Diana Cabrera (Tenis La Paz)	23.3

The 2024 Liga Sudamericana de Baloncesto Femenino was the 23rd edition of the South American women's club basketball championship organized by CONSUBASQUET.

Indeportes Antioquia was the last champion, but did not participate because it was qualified for the 2024 Women's Basketball League Americas.

== Format ==
Eight teams played in the group stage. They were divided into 2 groups of 4, with Luque and Buenos Aires as hosts. The top 2 advanced to the Final Four, with Luque as hosts. In this phase the teams played a single-match in semifinales, and the winners played the final, and the losers, the third place game.

== Teams ==
Association	Team (Berth)	Qualification method
Argentina (1 berth)	Obras	2023 Torneo Apertura runners-up
Bolivia (1 berth)	Tenis La Paz	2023 Liga Boliviana de Básquetbol Femenina champions
Brazil (1 berth)	SESI Araraquara	2023 Liga de Basquete Femenino champions
Chile (1 berth)	Universidad de Chile	2023 Liga Nacional Femenina runners-up
Colombia (1 berth)	Power	2023 Liga Superior de Baloncesto Femenino 4th place
Ecuador (1 berth)	Ambato Soldiers	2023 Liga Nacional Femenina champions
Paraguay (1 berth)	Félix Pérez Cardozo	2023 Liga Nacional Femenina champions
Uruguay (1 berth)	Aguada	2023 Liga Femenina de Básquetbol runners-up

== Round and draw dates ==
=== Schedule ===
Phase	Round	Round date
Group stage	Group A	3–5 May
Group stage	Group B	9–11 May
Final four	Semi-finals	15 June
Final four	Final and third place match	16 June

== Group stage ==
Location of teams of the 2024 Liga Sudamericana de Baloncesto Femenino group stage.
Red: Group A; Green: Group B.

The top four teams in each group will qualify to the Final Four.

If teams are level on record at the end of the regular season, tiebreakers are applied in the following order:

1. Head-to-head record
2. Head-to-head point differential
3. Head-to-head points scored
4. Point differential for the entire regular season
5. Points scored for the entire regular season

Ambato Soldiers, Power and Universidad de Chile made their debut.

The 2022 champions Félix Pérez Cardozo had its return after having played the Women's Basketball League Americas last year, being the only title holder this year.

Aguada was the team with the most consecutive participations, with three.

Eight national associations will be represented this season, two more than in 2023. A Brazilian team returned since 2019.

=== Group A ===
Pos	Team	Pld	W	L	PF	PA	PD	Pts	Qualification
1	(Paraguay) Félix Pérez Cardozo	3	3	0	225	196	+29	6	Advance to Final Four
2	(Brazil) SESI Araraquara	3	2	1	233	179	+54	5	Advance to Final Four
3	(Ecuador) Ambato Soldiers	3	1	2	197	228	−31	4	
4	Universidad de Chile	3	0	3	180	232	−52	3	

Source: FIBA
Rules for classification: 1) Points; 2) Head-to-head record; 4) Head-to-head point differential; 5) Head-to-head points scored; 6) Points difference; 7) Points scored.

3 May
18:30 UTC−4

Boxscore

Ambato Soldiers (Ecuador)	52–83	(Brazil) SESI Araraquara
Scoring by quarter: 12–32, 15–16, 13–27, 12–8
Pts: Weaver 19; Rebs: Caicedo, Noblet 7 Asts: Macías 2		Pts: Érika de Souza 13; Rebs: Érika de Souza 11; Asts: Débora 4

UENO COP Arena, Luque
Referees: Aline García (URU), Iván Huck (ARG), Leinel Pino (VEN)

3 May
18:30 UTC−4

Boxscore

Félix Pérez Cardozo (Paraguay)	71–62	Universidad de Chile
Scoring by quarter: 18–24, 18–12, 17–13, 18–13
Pts: Cherry 22; Rebs: Jourdheuil 11; Asts: Mercado 5		Pts: Ovalle 22; Rebs: Ovalle 10; Asts: Serrano 5

UENO COP Arena, Luque
Referees: Leonardo Zalazar (ARG), Carlos Pallares (COL), Nicolas Zivieri (BRA)

4 May
17:00 UTC−4

Boxscore

SESI Araraquara (Brazil)	75–47	Universidad de Chile
Scoring by quarter: 16–13, 24–15, 9–10, 26–9
Pts: Aline Moura 20; Rebs: Aline Moura 12; Asts: Izabela 5		Pts: Ovalle 12; Rebs: Abuyeres 6 Asts: Four players 2

UENO COP Arena, Luque
Referees: Leonardo Zalazar (ARG), Carlos Pallares (COL), Leinel Pino (VEN)

4 May
20:00 UTC−4

Boxscore

Félix Pérez Cardozo (Paraguay)	74–59	(Ecuador) Ambato Soldiers
Scoring by quarter: 22–22, 18–16, 22–9, 12–12
Pts: Cherry 18; Rebs: Mgbeike 7 Asts: Jourdheuil 5		Pts: Caicedo 17; Rebs: Raviolo 7 Asts: Lasso 4

UENO COP Arena, Luque
Referees: Aline García (URU), Iván Huck (ARG), Nicolas Zivieri (BRA)

5 May
17:00 UTC−4

Boxscore

Universidad de Chile	71–86	(Ecuador) Ambato Soldiers
Scoring by quarter: 21–20, 13–21, 19–20, 18–25
Pts: Campos 13; Rebs: Ovalle 13; Asts: Campos 5		Pts: Noblet, Caicedo 16; Rebs: Noblet 11; Asts: Lasso 6

UENO COP Arena, Luque
Referees: Leonardo Zalazar (ARG), Carlos Pallares (COL), Nicolas Zivieri (BRA)

5 May
20:00 UTC−4

Boxscore

Félix Pérez Cardozo (Paraguay)	80–75	(Brazil) SESI Araraquara
Scoring by quarter: 25–8, 18–14, 15–26, 22–27
Pts: Cherry 37; Rebs: Mercado 7 Asts: Jourdheuil, Mercado 4		Pts: Aline Moura, Jaqueline 18; Rebs: Aline Moura 8 Asts: Érika de Souza, Débora 5

UENO COP Arena, Luque
Referees: Aline García (URU), Iván Huck (ARG), Leinel Pino (VEN)

=== Group B ===
Pos	Team	Pld	W	L	PF	PA	PD	Pts	Qualification
1	(Argentina) Obras	3	3	0	235	156	+79	6	Advance to Final Four
2	(Uruguay) Aguada	3	2	1	197	209	−12	5	Advance to Final Four
3	(Bolivia) Tenis La Paz	3	1	2	202	216	−14	4	
4	(Colombia) Power	3	0	3	172	225	−53	3	

Source: FIBA
Rules for classification: 1) Points; 2) Head-to-head record; 4) Head-to-head point differential; 5) Head-to-head points scored; 6) Points difference; 7) Points scored.

9 May
17:00 UTC−3

Boxscore

Power (Colombia)	58–73	(Uruguay) Aguada
Scoring by quarter: 17–18, 10–19, 16–17, 15–19
Pts: Garrido 18; Rebs: Sánchez 12; Asts: Chivata, Giraldo 4		Pts: F. Fernández, Marín 17; Rebs: F. Fernández 21; Asts: Wolf 5

Estadio Obras Sanitarias, Buenos Aires
Referees: Julio Anaya (PAR), Micaela Prado (ARG), Nicolas Zivieri (BRA)

9 May
20:00 UTC−3

Boxscore

Obras (Argentina)	78–56	(Bolivia) Tenis La Paz
Scoring by quarter: 23–13, 20–8, 14–11, 21–24
Pts: Bourgarel 16; Rebs: Burani 12; Asts: Three players 3		Pts: Collier 13; Rebs: Cabrera 12; Asts: Lujan, Flores 4

Estadio Obras Sanitarias, Buenos Aires
Referees: Carlos Vélez (COL), César Gonçalves (BRA), Mariajesús González (CHI)

10 May
17:00 UTC−3

Boxscore

Tenis La Paz (Bolivia)	76–66	(Colombia) Power
Scoring by quarter: 16–7, 21–21, 15–18, 24–20
Pts: Cabrera 19; Rebs: Cabrera 18; Asts: Cabrera 6		Pts: De la Rosa 24; Rebs: De la Rosa 10; Asts: Sánchez 6

Estadio Obras Sanitarias, Buenos Aires
Referees: Micaela Prado (ARG), Mariajesús González (CHI), Julio Anaya (PAN)

10 May
20:00 UTC−3

Boxscore

Obras (Argentina)	81–52	(Uruguay) Aguada
Scoring by quarter: 21–15, 17–15, 24–10, 19–12
Pts: C. Gentinetta 17; Rebs: C. Gentinetta 15; Asts: Fernández 7		Pts: Marín 22; Rebs: F. Fernández 9 Asts: Gayoso 2

Estadio Obras Sanitarias, Buenos Aires
Referees: Nicolas Zivieri (BRA), César Gonçalves (BRA), Carlos Vélez (COL)

11 May
17:00 UTC−3

Boxscore

Aguada (Uruguay)	72–66	(Bolivia) Tenis La Paz
Scoring by quarter: 19–20, 20–14, 18–21, 15–15
Pts: F. Fernández 21; Rebs: F. Fernández 20; Asts: Marín 3		Pts: Fair 22; Rebs: Collier 23; Asts: Cabrera 6

Estadio Obras Sanitarias, Buenos Aires
Referees: Carlos Vélez (COL), Micaela Prado (ARG), César Gonçalves (BRA)

11 May
20:00 UTC−3

Boxscore

Obras (Argentina)	76–48	(Colombia) Power
Scoring by quarter: 25–12, 20–15, 12–9, 19–12
Pts: D. Gentinetta 14; Rebs: Three players 8 Asts: Burani, Muñoz 4		Pts: Chivata 13; Rebs: De la Rosa 8 Asts: Four players 1

Estadio Obras Sanitarias, Buenos Aires
Referees: Julio Anaya (PAN), Nicolas Zivieri (BRA), Mariajesús González (CHI)

== Final Four ==
The Final Four was held at the UENO COP Arena in Luque, Paraguay.

=== Bracket ===
Semifinals
15 June
(Paraguay) Félix Pérez Cardozo	74
(Uruguay) Aguada	81
15 June
(Argentina) Obras	50
(Brazil) SESI Araraquara	59

Final
16 June
(Uruguay) Aguada	69
(Brazil) SESI Araraquara	87
Third place
16 June
(Paraguay) Félix Pérez Cardozo	71
(Argentina) Obras	75

=== Semifinals ===
15 June
17:00 UTC−4

Boxscore

Obras (Argentina)	50–59	(Brazil) SESI Araraquara
Scoring by quarter: 15–18, 20–21, 11–11, 14–9
Pts: Suárez 15; Rebs: Burani 10; Asts: Suárez 3		Pts: Sossô 17; Rebs: Josefino 11; Asts: Sossô 4

UENO COP Arena, Luque
Referees: Andrés Bartel (URU), Alejandra Sanabria (PAR), Daniel García (VEN)

15 June
20:00 UTC−4

Boxscore

Félix Pérez Cardozo (Paraguay)	74–81	(Uruguay) Aguada
Scoring by quarter: 16–19, 28–23, 18–19, 12–20
Pts: Cherry 19; Rebs: Mgbeike 7 Asts: Mercado 5		Pts: Marín 27; Rebs: F. Fernández 12; Asts: Niski 6

UENO COP Arena, Luque
Referees: Micaela Prado (ARG), Ramiro Marques (BRA), Alan Dos Santos (BRA)

=== Third place game ===
16 June
16:00 UTC−4

Boxscore

Félix Pérez Cardozo (Paraguay)	71–75	(Argentina) Obras
Scoring by quarter: 21–30, 21–14, 13–14, 16–17
Pts: Mgbeike 15; Rebs: Wilson 9 Asts: Pereira 4		Pts: Chagas 23; Rebs: Muñoz, Burani 7 Asts: Three players 3

UENO COP Arena, Luque
Referees: Andrés Bartel (URU), Alan Dos Santos (BRA), Yezid Carreño (COL)

=== Final ===
16 June
16:00 UTC−4

Boxscore

(Uruguay) Aguada	69–87	(Brazil) SESI Araraquara
Scoring by quarter: 18–23, 10–23, 16–19, 25–22
Pts: Marín 28; Rebs: F. Fernández 10; Asts: Niski 3		Pts: De Oliveira 22; Rebs: Josefino 13; Asts: Débora 5

UENO COP Arena, Luque
Referees: Daniel García (VEN), Micaela Prado (ARG), Iván Huck (ARG)

2024 Liga Sudamericana de Baloncesto Femenino Champions

SESI Araraquara
First title

== Awards ==
=== MVP ===
Player	Team
(Brazil) Sossô	(Brazil) SESI Araraquara

=== All-Tournament Team ===
Player	Team
(Argentina) Camila Suárez	(Argentina) Obras
(Paraguay) Belén Pereira	(Paraguay) Félix Pérez Cardozo
(Argentina) Agustina Marín	(Uruguay) Aguada
(Brazil) Sossô	(Brazil) SESI Araraquara
(Brazil) Emanuely De Oliveira	(Brazil) SESI Araraquara

== See also ==
- 2024 Liga Sudamericana de Básquetbol
- 2024 Women's Basketball League Americas
