= 2018–19 Moldovan National Division (basketball) =

- Season: 2018–19
- Duration: 11 November 2018 – May 2019
- Teams: 6

Finals
- Champions: Donbasket
- Runners-up: Tighina

The 2018–19 Moldovan National Division season was the 28th in of the top basketball league in Moldova.

Basco were the defending champions.

== Competition format ==
Six teams joined the regular season, played as a double-legged round-robin tournament. The four best qualified teams joined the playoffs, that would be played in a best-of-five format.

== Teams ==
Locations of the 2018–19 National Division teams

Team	City
Admirals	Chișinău
Donbasket	Dondușeni
Gama-Sind	Cahul
Rîbnița	Rîbnița
Tighina	Bender
USMF	Chișinău

== Regular season ==
=== League table ===
Pos	Team	Pld	W	L	PF	PA	PD	Pts	Qualification
1	Donbasket	10	9	1	917	718	+199	19	Qualification to the playoffs
2	Tighina	10	6	4	849	801	+48	16	Qualification to the playoffs
3	Rîbnița	10	6	4	876	777	+99	16	Qualification to the playoffs
4	USMF	10	5	5	796	747	+49	15	Qualification to the playoffs
5	Gama-Sind	10	4	6	730	773	−43	14	
6	Admirals	10	0	10	595	947	−352	10	

=== Results ===
Home \ Away	ADM	DON	GAM	RIB	TIG	USM
Admirals	—	65–107	54–92	66–79	80–102	51–76
Donbasket	96–57	—	74–65	92–80	92–70	84–94
Gama-Sind	79–54	79–94	—	46–103	74–80	50–80
Rîbnița	113–61	70–89	84–88	—	72–91	78–71
Tighina	96–42	78–102	88–86	91–99	—	70–82
USMF	107–65	70–87	62–81	82–98	72–83	—

Legend: Blue = home team win; Red = away team win.

== Playoffs ==
All series were played in a best-of-five playoff format (2-2-1).

=== Bracket ===
Semi-finals
Donbasket	3
USMF	0
Tighina	3
Rîbnița	2

Finals
Donbasket	3
Tighina	0
Third place
Rîbnița	1
USMF	1

=== Semi-finals ===
Team 1	Series	Team 2	Game 1	Game 2	Game 3	Game 4	Game 5
Donbasket	3–0	USMF	96–60	99~62	104–71		
Tighina	3–2	Rîbnița	81–69	86–70	80–84	74–76	85–81

=== Fifth place series ===
Team 1	Series	Team 2	Game 1	Game 2	Game 3	Game 4	Game 5
Gama-Sind	3–0	Admirals	72–57	72–36	80–50		

=== Third place series ===
Team 1	Series	Team 2	Game 1	Game 2	Game 3	Game 4	Game 5
Rîbnița	1–1	USMF	94–85	73–97			

=== Finals ===
Team 1	Series	Team 2	Game 1	Game 2	Game 3	Game 4	Game 5
Donbasket	3–0	Tighina	93–76	77–74	87–80		
