= 2017–18 Division 1 =

2017–18 Maltese Division 1
- Season: 2017–18
- Duration: 26 November 2017 – 15 May 2018
- Teams: 5

Regular season
- Top seed: Athleta

Finals
- Champions: Hibernians
- Runners-up: Athleta

The 2017–18 Maltese Division 1 season, is the premier men's basketball competition in Malta. BUPA Luxol are the defending champions.

== Competition format ==
Five teams joined the regular season and competed in a double-legged round-robin tournament. The four best qualified teams of the regular season joined the playoffs.

== Regular season ==
=== League table ===
Pos	Team	Pld	W	L	PF	PA	PD	Pts	Qualification
1	Athleta	12	11	1	773	503	+270	23	Qualification to the playoffs
2	Hibernians	12	9	3	716	717	−1	21	Qualification to the playoffs
3	BUPA Luxol	12	6	6	697	626	+71	18	Qualification to the playoffs
4	Cynergi	12	3	9	657	683	−26	15	Qualification to the playoffs
5	Starlites	12	1	11	461	775	−314	13	

== Playoffs ==
Playoffs started on 25 April 2018 and ended on 16 May 2018. The semifinals were played in a best-of-three-games format, while the finals in a best-of-five one.

Semi-finals
Athleta	78	89
Cynergi	67	82
Hibernians	83	79
BUPA Luxol	62	66

Final
Athleta	88	59	79	63
Hibernians	75	67	87	75
