= C.S.D. Universidad Tecnológica Equinoccial =

Ecuadorian sports club

UTE
- Full name: Club Social y Deportivo Universidad Tecnológica Equinoccial
- Founded: November 12, 1986
- Ground: Estadio Universitario César Aníbal Espinoza; Quito, Ecuador
- Capacity: 15,000
- Chairman: Patricio Pozo Peñafiel
- Manager: Mario Arango
- League: Segunda Categoría
- 2010: Serie B, 11th (relegated)
| Home colours | Away colours |

Club Social y Deportivo Universidad Tecnológica Equinoccial, sometimes referred as UTE Quito or simply UTE, is a multi-sports club based in Quito, Ecuador known for their professional football team. They currently play in the country's third-level football league—the Segunda Categoría.

They played one season in the second tier Serie B in 2010.
