= Women's Basketball League Americas =

Basketball league in Americas for women's basketball clubs

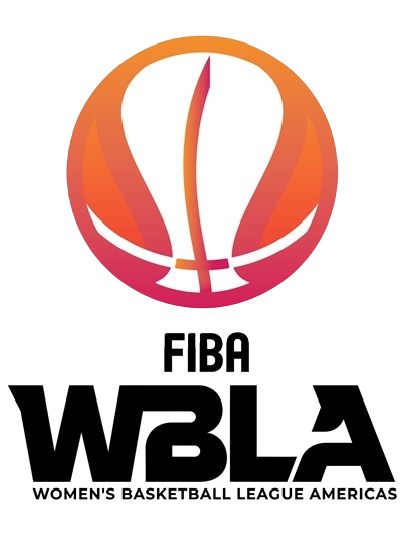
- Organising body: FIBA Americas
- First season: 2023
- Region: Americas
- Number of teams: 6
- Level on pyramid: Top women's league in Americas
- Related competitions: Liga Sudamericana de Baloncesto Femenino (2nd tier)
- Current champions: (United States) Bay Area Phoenix (1st title)
- Most championships: (Colombia) Indeportes Antioquia (2 titles)
- Website: FIBA.basketball/wblamericas
- 2024 WBLA

The Women's Basketball League Americas (also known as the WBLA) is the top basketball league in Americas for women's basketball clubs.

First established by FIBA Americas in 2023, to expand the women's basketball competitions when previously, the South American teams, and the Central American and North American teams, played separate tournaments.

At the initial tournament Indeportes Antioquia of Colombia were crowned champions, beating uruguayan club, Malvín at the final disputed in Rionegro.

== Format ==
The 8 clubs were divided into two groups of four teams, each with a host.

The two best-placed clubs in each group qualified for the Final Four.

The Final Four were established according to the standings of each team in the groups. It is organized by one of the qualified clubs. The semi-finales were played in a single-match, like the third place game, and the final.

== Results ==
#	Year	Final 4 host	Final			Third and fourth place			MVP
#	Year	Final 4 host	Champion	Score	Runners-up	Third	Score	Fourth	MVP
1	2023	(Colombia); Rionegro	(Colombia); Indeportes Antioquia	74–54	(Uruguay); Malvín	Universidad de Chile	99–94	(Mexico); Centauros de Chihuahua	(Colombia); Mabel Martínez
2	2024	(Colombia); Medellín	(Colombia); Indeportes Antioquia	61–53	(United States); Bay Area Phoenix	(Argentina); Unión Florida	80–72	(Chile); Sportiva Italiana	(Colombia); Carolina López
3	2026	(Chile); Santiago	(United States); Bay Area Phoenix	87–82	(Chile); Sportiva Italiana	(Brazil); SESI Araraquara	65–53	(Chile); Colegio Los Leones	(United States); Rosemarie Julien

== Statistics ==
=== Medals by country ===
Rank	Nation	Gold	Silver	Bronze	Total
1	Colombia	2	0	0	2
2	United States	1	1	0	2
3	Chile	0	1	2	3
4	Uruguay	0	1	0	1
5	Argentina	0	0	1	1
5	Brazil	0	0	1	1
Totals (6 entries)		3	3	4	10

=== Titles by club ===
Rank	Club	Winners	Runners-up
1	(Colombia) Indeportes Antioquia	2	0
2	(United States) Bay Area Phoenix	1	1

== Stats leaders ==
Season	Top scorer	PPG	Top rebounder	RPG	Top assistant	APG
2023	(United States) Kristen Spolyar	25.4	(Argentina) Candela Gentinetta	13.3	(United States) Porsche Poole	9.7
2024	(Colombia) Manuela Ríos	25.0	(Argentina) Carla Miculka	12.0	(Colombia) Manuela Ríos	6.6
2026	(United States) Andrea Daley	22.8	(Brazil) Gabriela Guimarães	11.0	(United States) Connie Clarke	5.2

== See also ==
=== Men's competitions ===
- Basketball Champions League Americas
- Liga Sudamericana de Baloncesto

=== Women's competitions ===
- South American Women's Basketball League
