= Ralph Hodge =

American basketball coach (1953–2018)

Biographical details
- Born: April 28, 1953; Decatur, Illinois
- Died: November 29, 2018 (aged 65); Chicago, Illinois

Playing career
- 1971–1975: Olivet Nazarene

Coaching career (HC unless noted)
- 1979–2018: Olivet Nazarene

Head coaching record
- Overall: 775–487

Ralph Hodge (April 28, 1953 – November 29, 2018) was an American college basketball head coach for Olivet Nazarene University.

== Career ==
Hodge became the head coach at Olivet Nazarene in 1979. He is one of only 78 college head coaches to win 600 games. As of 2012, Hodge's 671 wins at the school placed him third on the all-time list for NAIA Division I.

== Death ==
Hodge died on November 29, 2018, at the age of 65.
