= John Kline (basketball) =

American basketball player (1931–2018)

John Kline (November 18, 1931 – July 26, 2018) was an American basketball player for the Harlem Globetrotters (1953–1959) who founded the Black Legends of Professional Basketball in 1996.

Kline was a high-leaping 6-foot-3 star nicknamed Jumpin’ Johnny at Wayne University (now Wayne State University) in Detroit, because of his poor grades he dropped out of Wayne State to join the Globetrotters in 1953. During the six years with the Globetrotters, he had helped the team to win the "World Series of Basketball" against the College All-Americans, and in 1959 achieved their first undefeated season with 441 wins.

In 1959 he left the Globetrotters and for the season 1960–61 he played in Pennsylvania for the Sunbury Mercuries of the Eastern Professional Basketball League, a rung below the N.B.A. The 60's was a lost decade for Kline as he struggled with a drug addiction for almost eight years.

He resumed his education at the Wayne State, where he received bachelor's and master's degrees before earning a Ph.D. in education. In the early 1970s, he began a new career as director of a methadone program. In 1986 he was named the director of education and substance abuse for the City of Detroit's health department, the Times reports and soon after was appointed to Michigan's nursing board.

Kline founded the Black Legends of Professional Basketball Foundation with the aim to bring recognize and establish retirement plans for the game's early players, many of whom are not recognized by the NBA because they didn't play in the league. Kline was inducted into the African-American Hall of Fame, Wayne State's sports hall of fame and the Michigan Sports Hall of Fame.

Kline died on July 26, 2018, at his home in Lebanon, Tennessee, at the age of 86. He is survived by five daughters; Sharon Hill, Britt Thomas, Cheryl Thomas, Terry Dennis and Kelly Mack; four sons; Benjamin Daniels, John Kline III, Michael Kline and Alan Daniels; his brother, Ronald Colvard; 22 grandchildren; and 28 great-grandchildren.

== Legacy ==
His life was the subject of the 2019 documentary film Jumpin' Johnny: The Incredible True Story of Dr. John Kline directed by Cameron McCasland.
