= 2017–18 Moldovan National Division (basketball) =

- Season: 2017–18
- Duration: 12 November 2017 – May 2018
- Teams: 5

Regular season
- Top seed: Basco

Finals
- Champions: Basco
- Runners-up: Gama-Sind

The 2017–18 Moldovan National Division season, was the 27th season of the top basketball league in Moldova.

Basco are the defending champions.

== Competition format ==
Five teams joined the regular season, played as a double-legged round-robin tournament. The four best qualified teams joined the playoffs, that would be played in a best-of-five format.

== Teams ==
Locations of the 2017–18 National Division teams

Team	City
Basco	Bălți
Gama-Sind	Cahul
Rîbnița	Rîbnița
Speranța	Chișinău
USMF	Chișinău

== Regular season ==
=== League table ===
Pos	Team	Pld	W	L	PF	PA	PD	Pts	Qualification
1	Basco	8	8	0	773	503	+270	16	Qualification to the playoffs
2	Speranța	8	4	4	716	717	−1	12	Qualification to the playoffs
3	Gama-Sind	8	4	4	697	626	+71	12	Qualification to the playoffs
4	Rîbnița	8	4	4	657	683	−26	12	Qualification to the playoffs
5	USMF	8	0	8	461	775	−314	8	

== Playoffs ==
Playoffs started on 4 March 2018 and ended on 6 May 2018. Teams that placed better at the end of the regular season played games 1, 2 and 5 at home.

Quarterfinals
Basco	94	91	83
Rîbnița	66	74	62
Speranța	85	84	86	86
Gama-Sind	86	81	102	113

Semifinals
Basco	106	92	74
Gama-Sind	58	70	62

Third place
Speranța	75	98	58
Rîbnița	87	108	90
