= Moldovan National Division (basketball) =

Professional basketball league in Moldova

National Division
- Sport: Basketball
- No. of teams: 8
- Country: Moldova
- Continent: FIBA Europe
- Level on pyramid: 1
- Relegation to: A Division
- Related competitions: Moldovan Basketball Cup
- Website: moldova.basketball/national-basketball/

The Moldovan National Division (Romanian: Divizia Naţională a Moldovei) is the top men's professional basketball league of Moldova. The league is governed by the Basketball Federation of Moldova.

A notable player has been Ulhas Koravi Satyanarayan, one of the league's topscorers of the 2021–22 season.

== Current clubs ==
Team	City
Academia Pervanciuc Moldova	Chișinău
CBA Baschet	Ceadîr-Lunga
Ceadîr Basket	Ceadîr-Lunga
Comrat Horses	Ceadîr-Lunga
Fortius Călărași	Călărași
Gloria	Chișinău
Northland Rîbnița	Rîbnița
Royal Chișinău	Chișinău
Soroca-Baschet	Soroca
Sparta Chișinău	Chișinău
SS1 Bălți	Bălți
Strășeni	Strășeni
Technical University of Moldova	Chișinău
Titan Baschet	Criuleni

== Latest finals ==
Season	Champion	Runner-up	Score
2008–09	ASEM	UASM	3–0
2009–10	Gama-Sind	ASEM	3–2
2010–11	UASM	Donbasket	3–0
2011–12	Donbasket	PGU-SDUSHOR	League
2012–13	Donbasket	Gama-Sind	3–0
2013–14	Donbasket	Gama-Sind	3–0
2014–15	Donbasket	UASM	3–0
2015–16	Speranța	Donbasket	League
2016–17	Basco	Alfa Basket	3–2
2016–17	Basco	Alfa Basket	3–2
2017–18	Basco	Gama-Sind	3–0
2018–19	Donbasket	Tighina	3–0
2019–20	Gama-Sind	Basco	69–66
2020–21	Basco	SS1	77–58
2021–22	Basco	BAM Basket	2–0
2022–23	SS1	Ceadir Basket	3–0
2023–24	ASEM	SS1	3–0
2024–25	Ceadir Basket	Soroca–Baschet	3–0
2025–26	Ceadir Basket	Gloria	3–0
