= 2024 Women's Basketball League Americas =

Basketball competition in the Americas region

Women's Basketball League Americas
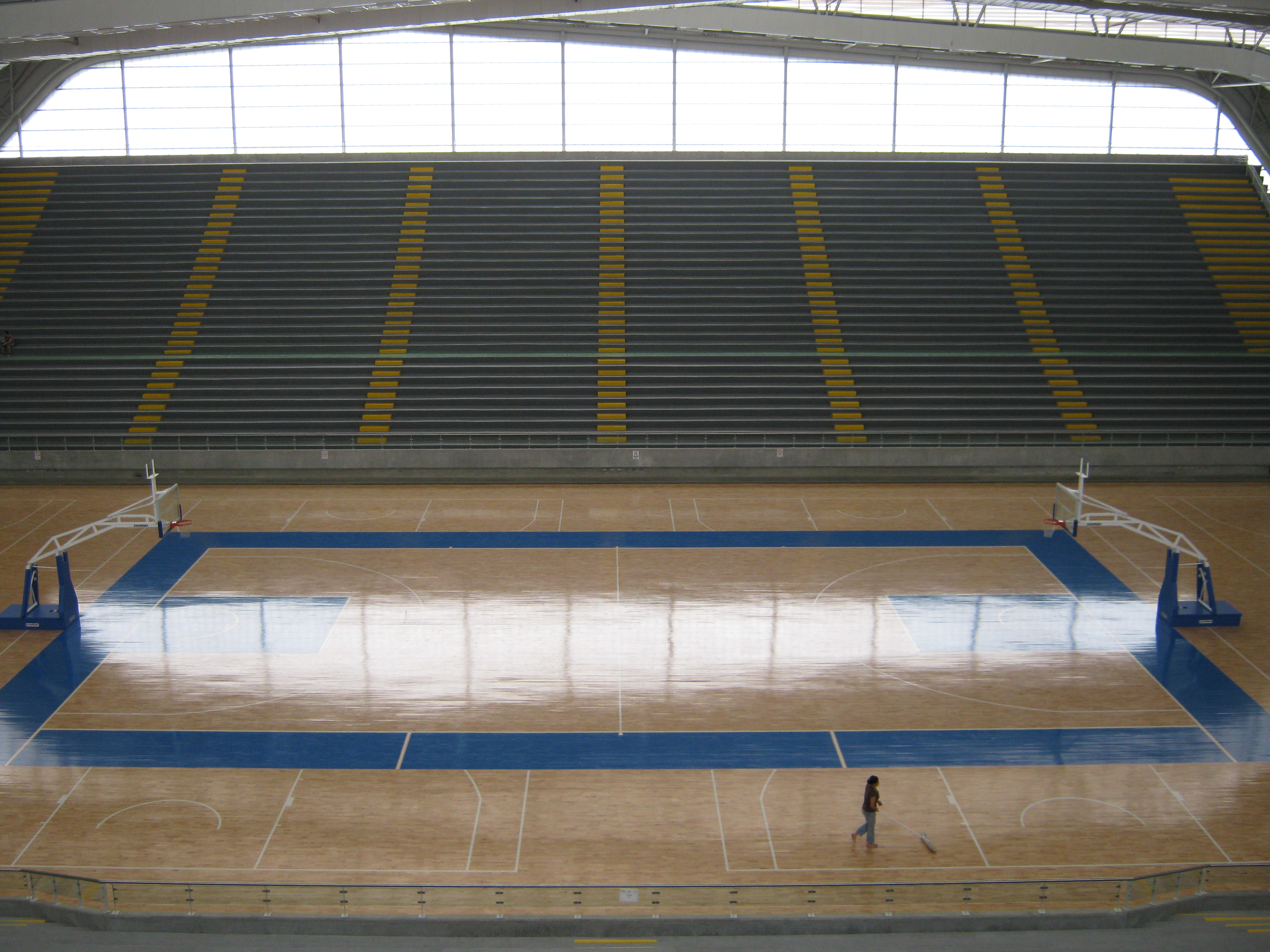
- The Coliseo Iván de Bedout in Medellín hosted the final four.
- Season: 2024
- Dates: 13 September – 2 November 2024
- Games played: 16
- Teams: Total: 8 (from 7 countries)

Regular season
- Season MVP: (Colombia) Carolina López

Finals
- Champions: (Colombia) Indeportes Antioquia (2nd title)
- Runners-up: (United States) Bay Area Phoenix
- Third place: (Argentina) Unión Florida
- Fourth place: (Chile) Sportiva Italiana

Statistical leaders
- Points: (Colombia) Manuela Ríos (25 points per game)
- Rebounds: (Argentina) Carla Miculka (12 rebounds per game)
- Assists: (Colombia) Manuela Ríos (6.6 assists per game)
- Index Rating: (United States) Rebecca Harris (20.2 per game)

The 2024 Women's Basketball League Americas was the 2nd edition of the competition for women's basketball club teams from the Americas region organised by FIBA Americas. Indeportes Antioquia are the defending champions.

Indeportes Antioquia successfully defended their title with a win over Bay Area Phoenix in the final.

== Format ==
Eight teams are split into two groups of four based on their geographical position. The groups are held in centralised venues. The top two in each group advance to the final four to decide the champions.

== Schedule ==
=== Rounds and dates ===
Phase	Round date
Group A	13–15 September 2024
Group B	27–29 September 2024
Final four	1–2 November 2024

== Teams ==
The following teams participated:

Country	Teams	Qualification
Argentina	(Argentina) Unión Florida	2023 Torneo Apertura champions
Argentina	(Argentina) Ferro	2024 Torneo Clausura champions
Chile	(Chile) Sportiva Italiana	2023 Liga Nacional Femenina champions
Colombia	(Colombia) Indeportes Antioquia	2023 Liga Superior Femenina de Baloncesto champions
El Salvador	(El Salvador) Salvadoreñas	2024 Torneo Apertura runners-up
Mexico	(Mexico) Pioneras de Delicias	Wild Card from 2024 Liga ABC MEX
United States	(United States) Bay Area Phoenix	Wild Card from Women's Premier Basketball Association
Uruguay	(Uruguay) Malvín	2023 Liga Femenina de Básquetbol champions

== Venues ==
The venues are in Buenos Aires and Medellín.

Group B and Final four		Group A
(Colombia) Medellín	2024 Women's Basketball League Americas is located in South America	(Argentina) Buenos Aires
Coliseo Iván de Bedout	2024 Women's Basketball League Americas is located in South America	Estadio Héctor Etchart
Capacity: 6,000	2024 Women's Basketball League Americas is located in South America	Capacity: 4,500

== Group Stage ==
Location of teams of the 2024 Women's Basketball League Americas group stage.
Red: Group A; Green: Group B.

The top four teams in each group will qualify to the Final Four.

If teams are level on record at the end of the regular season, tiebreakers are applied in the following order:

1. Head-to-head record
2. Head-to-head point differential
3. Head-to-head points scored
4. Point differential for the entire regular season
5. Points scored for the entire regular season

Only Indeportes Antioquia, Malvín and Salvadoreñas return from the first edition.

A team from the United States made its debut in the tournament.

Seven national associations will be represented this season.

=== Group A ===
Pos	Team	Pld	W	L	PF	PA	PD	Pts	Qualification
1	(Argentina) Unión Florida	3	3	0	199	160	+39	6	Final four
2	(Chile) Sportiva Italiana	3	2	1	203	189	+14	5	Final four
3	(Argentina) Ferro	3	1	2	184	218	−34	4	
4	(Uruguay) Malvín	3	0	3	182	201	−19	3	

Source: FIBA
Rules for classification: 1) classification points; 2) head-to-head results; 3) head-to-head game points difference; 4) head-to-head number of game points scored.

13 September 2024
19:00

Boxscore

Unión Florida (Argentina)	51–49	(Uruguay) Malvín
Scoring by quarter: 8–22, 20–7, 11–12, 12–8
Pts: Laviero 12; Rebs: Gauna 8 Asts: Martínez 3		Pts: Jourdheui 16; Rebs: Miculka 15; Asts: Fernández 7

Estadio Héctor Etchart, Buenos Aires
Referees: Kristian Paez (ECU), Fernando Leite (BRA), Omar Bermúdez Mariscal (MEX)

13 September 2024
21:30

Boxscore

Ferro (Argentina)	54–72	(Chile) Sportiva Italiana
Scoring by quarter: 13–24, 16–26, 19–13, 6–9
Pts: Fernández 19; Rebs: Fernández 12; Asts: González 4		Pts: Cortés 17; Rebs: Cortés 17; Asts: Ríos 9

Estadio Héctor Etchart, Buenos Aires
Attendance: 100
Referees: Julirys Guzmán Laureano (PUR), Nicolas Zivieri (BRA), Aline García (URU)

14 September 2024
19:00

Boxscore

Unión Florida (Argentina)	74–61	(Chile) Sportiva Italiana
Scoring by quarter: 21–13, 18–17, 14–18, 21–13
Pts: three players 13; Rebs: Martínez 9 Asts: Martínez 7		Pts: Ríos 24; Rebs: Martínez 9 Asts: Pérez 7

Estadio Héctor Etchart, Buenos Aires
Attendance: 100
Referees: Kristian Páez (ECU), Nicolas Zivieri (BRA), Aline García (URU)

14 September 2024
21:30

Boxscore

Ferro (Argentina)	80–72	(Uruguay) Malvín
Scoring by quarter: 22–12, 23–16, 14–26, 21–18
Pts: Fernández, Gonzalez 20; Rebs: Fernández 11; Asts: Gonzalez, Romagnoli 3		Pts: Fernández 26; Rebs: Miculka 13; Asts: Fernández 4

Estadio Héctor Etchart, Buenos Aires
Attendance: 200
Referees: Fernando Leite (BRA), Julirys Guzmán Laureano (PUR), Luis Ángel Escobedo Silva (MEX)

15 September 2024
19:00

Boxscore

Sportiva Italiana (Chile)	70–61	(Uruguay) Malvín
Scoring by quarter: 11–17, 16–18, 19–14, 24–12
Pts: Ríos 27; Rebs: Cortés 11; Asts: Pérez, Ríos 4		Pts: Jourdheuil 19; Rebs: Jourdheuil 12; Asts: Fernandez, Jourdheuil 4

Estadio Héctor Etchart, Buenos Aires
Attendance: 100
Referees: Kristian Páez (ECU), Fernando Leite (BRA), Luis Ángel Escobedo Silva (MEX)

15 September 2024
21:30

Boxscore

Ferro (Argentina)	50–74	(Argentina) Unión Florida
Scoring by quarter: 14–19, 11–17, 9–25, 16–13
Pts: Foresto 10; Rebs: Fernández 11; Asts: Romagnoli 3		Pts: three players 11; Rebs: Alonso 10; Asts: Martínez 5

Estadio Héctor Etchart, Buenos Aires
Attendance: 150
Referees: Julirys Guzmán Laureano (PUR), Aline García (URU), Nicolás Zivieri (BRA)

=== Group B ===
Pos	Team	Pld	W	L	PF	PA	PD	Pts	Qualification
1	(United States) Bay Area Phoenix	3	3	0	224	203	+21	6	Final four
2	(Colombia) Indeportes Antioquia	3	2	1	187	161	+26	5	Final four
3	(Mexico) Pioneros de Delicias	3	1	2	179	190	−11	4	
4	(El Salvador) Salvadoreñas	3	0	3	172	208	−36	3	

Source: FIBA
Rules for classification: 1) classification points; 2) head-to-head results; 3) head-to-head game points difference; 4) head-to-head number of game points scored.

27 September 2024
17:30

Boxscore

Bay Area Phoenix (United States)	81–69	(Mexico) Pioneros de Delicias
Scoring by quarter: 16–11, 16–15, 26–22, 23–21
Pts: Collier 24; Rebs: Harris 7 Asts: Li 6		Pts: Suárez 15; Rebs: Davis 12; Asts: Davis 5

Coliseo Iván de Bedout, Medellín
Attendance: 2,000
Referees: Micaela Prado (ARG), Gustavo Edson Mathias (BRA), Carlos Pallares (COL)

27 September 2024
20:00

Boxscore

Indeportes Antioquia (Colombia)	65–51	(El Salvador) Salvadoreñas
Scoring by quarter: 19–6, 17–13, 14–12, 15–20
Pts: Muñoz 17; Rebs: Paz 12; Asts: Caicedo 6		Pts: Galindo 12; Rebs: Contreras 10; Asts: Alfaro, Montero 3

Coliseo Iván de Bedout, Medellín
Attendance: 2,000
Referees: Orlando José Varela Díaz (HON), César Augusto Gonçalves Lopes (BRA), Brooke Briscoe (CAN)

28 September 2024
17:30

Boxscore

Salvadoreñas (El Salvador)	82–90	(United States) Bay Area Phoenix
Scoring by quarter: 26–28, 15–23, 19–19, 22–20
Pts: Galindo 23; Rebs: Galindo 10; Asts: Montero 8		Pts: Harris 28; Rebs: A, Collier 7 Asts: Robinson 5

Coliseo Iván de Bedout, Medellín
Attendance: 2,000
Referees: Orlando José Varela Díaz (HON), Carlos Pallares (COL), César Augusto Gonçalves Lopes (BRA)

28 September 2024
20:00

Boxscore

Indeportes Antioquia (Colombia)	70–57	(Mexico) Pioneros de Delicias
Scoring by quarter: 21–17, 19–14, 14–14, 16–12
Pts: Muñoz 21; Rebs: Muñoz, Paz 9 Asts: Lopez 6		Pts: Suárez 27; Rebs: Davis, Perez 7 Asts: Pérez 3

Coliseo Iván de Bedout, Medellín
Attendance: 2,000
Referees: Gustavo Edson Mathias (BRA), Micaela Prado (ARG), Brooke Briscoe (CAN)

29 September 2024
17:30

Boxscore

Pioneros de Delicias (Mexico)	53–39	(El Salvador) Salvadoreñas
Scoring by quarter: 14–10, 18–13, 9–5, 12–11
Pts: Valenzuela 13; Rebs: Davis 10; Asts: Xicontecatl 4		Pts: Galindo 15; Rebs: Harvey-Carr, Vega 8 Asts: Contreras 2

Coliseo Iván de Bedout, Medellín
Attendance: 2,000
Referees: César Augusto Gonçalves Lopes (BRA), Micaela Prado (ARG), Carlos Pallares (COL)

29 September 2024
20:00

Boxscore

Indeportes Antioquia (Colombia)	52–53	(United States) Bay Area Phoenix
Scoring by quarter: 14–15, 20–16, 13–8, 5–14
Pts: Caicedo 13; Rebs: Muñoz 11; Asts: López 5		Pts: Harris 15; Rebs: Harris 12; Asts: Collier, Jackson 3

Coliseo Iván de Bedout, Medellín
Attendance: 500
Referees: Orlando José Varela Díaz (HON), Gustavo Edson Mathias (BRA), Brooke Briscoe (CAN)

== Final four ==
The final four was held at the Coliseo Iván de Bedout in Medellín, Colombia.

=== Bracket ===
Semifinals
1 November
(Argentina) Unión Florida	59
(Colombia) Indeportes Antioquia	73
1 November
(United States) Bay Area Phoenix (2OT)	94
(Chile) Sportiva Italiana	93

Final
2 November
(Colombia) Indeportes Antioquia	61
(United States) Bay Area Phoenix	53
Third place
2 November
(Argentina) Unión Florida	80
(Chile) Sportiva Italiana	72

=== Semifinals ===
1 November 2024
16:30

Boxscore

Bay Area Phoenix (United States)	94–93 (2OT)	(Chile) Sportiva Italiana
Scoring by quarter: 22–18, 19–24, 21–19, 16–17, Overtime: 7–7, 9–8
Pts: Harris, Li 20; Rebs: Bennett 21; Asts: three players 4		Pts: Ríos 37; Rebs: Harrison 19; Asts: Ríos 11

Coliseo Iván de Bedout, Medellín
Attendance: 2,000
Referees: Carmelo De la Rosa Álvarez (PUR), Orlando José Varela Díaz (HON), Fei Xiang (CAN)

1 November 2024
19:00

Boxscore

Unión Florida (Argentina)	59–73	(Colombia) Indeportes Antioquia
Scoring by quarter: 13–16, 20–15, 21–16, 19–12
Pts: López 23; Rebs: Paz 14; Asts: Caicedo 6		Pts: Maggi 14; Rebs: Botta 10; Asts: Martínez 4

Coliseo Iván de Bedout, Medellín
Attendance: 2,000
Referees: Daniel García (VEN), Nicolás Zivieri (BRA), Aline García (URU)

=== Third place game ===
2 November 2024
14:30

Boxscore

Unión Florida (Argentina)	80–72	(Chile) Sportiva Italiana
Scoring by quarter: 17–8, 23–32, 17–15, 23–17
Pts: Alonso 20; Rebs: Martínez 11; Asts: Martínez 6		Pts: Ríos 21; Rebs: Cortés, Harrison 9 Asts: Ríos 6

Coliseo Iván de Bedout, Medellín
Attendance: 2,000
Referees: Carmelo De la Rosa Álvarez (PUR), Nicolás Zivieri (BRA), Orlando José Varela Díaz (HON)

=== Final ===
2 November 2024
17:00

Boxscore

Indeportes Antioquia (Colombia)	61–53	(United States) Bay Area Phoenix
Scoring by quarter: 21–17, 13–9, 12–17, 15–10
Pts: López, Muñoz 15; Rebs: Paz 11; Asts: Caicedo 3		Pts: Harris 25; Rebs: Bennett 18; Asts: Li 3

Coliseo Iván de Bedout, Medellín
Attendance: 2,000
Referees: Daniel García (VEN), Julirys Guzmán Laureano (PUR), Larissa Sales Rodrigues (BRA)

2024 Women's Basketball League Americas winner

Indeportes Antioquia
Second title

== Awards ==
=== MVP ===
Player	Team
(Colombia) Carolina López	(Colombia) Indeportes Antioquia

=== All-Tournament Team ===
Player	Team
(Colombia) Manuela Ríos	(Chile) Sportiva Italiana
(Colombia) Carolina López	(Colombia) Indeportes Antioquia
(Colombia) Jenifer Muñoz	(Colombia) Indeportes Antioquia
(Argentina) Flor Martínez	(Argentina) Unión Florida
(United States) Rebecca Harris	(United States) Bay Area Phoenix

== See also ==
- 2024 Liga Sudamericana de Baloncesto Femenino
- 2024–25 BCL Americas
