= Alberto Marson =

Brazilian basketball player (1925–2018)

Personal information
- Born: 24 February 1925 Casa Branca, São Paulo, Brazil
- Died: 25 April 2018 (aged 93) São José dos Campos, São Paulo, Brazil
Medals
Men's basketball
Representing Brazil
Olympic Games
Bronze medal – third place	1948 London	Team
Pan American Games
Bronze medal – third place	1951 Buenos Aires	Team

Alberto Marson (24 February 1925 – 25 April 2018) was a Brazilian basketball player. He competed in the 1948 Summer Olympics in London, United Kingdom. There, he won the bronze medal with the men's national basketball team. He was born in São Paulo in 1925. Marson died in April 2018 at the age of 93.
