= Rico Pontvianne =

Mexican basketball player (1943–2018)

Ricardo Antonio Pontvianne (20 October 1943 – 13 August 2018) was a Mexican basketball player who competed in the 1964 Summer Olympics and in the 1968 Summer Olympics. He was born in Tampico, Tamaulipas.
