= Club Malvín =

- Nickname: Azul de la playa, Playero, Gaviota
- League: Liga Uruguaya de Básquetbol
- Founded: 28 January 1938
- Arena: Estadio Club Malvín, Montevideo, Uruguay
- Capacity: 1000
- Main sponsor: ANTEL
- President: Sergio Somma
- Team manager: Pablo López
- Championships: 5 LUB titles (2007, 2011, 2014, 2015, 2018)
Home	Away	Third

Club Malvín is a sports club from Montevideo, Uruguay, established on January 28, 1938, in the residential neighbourhood of Malvín. The club engages in several sports: futsal, tennis, and handball, but basketball is by far the most important.

== History ==
Club Malvín first president was Alberto Nieto. In 1938, the foundation year, Malvín started its sports activity, playing in the Federal Basketball Championship of Fourth Division (organized by the Uruguayan Basketball Federation -Federacion Uruguaya de Basketball-), in the club's first court located in Amazonas street.

The first headquarters of the club were located in the crossing of Río de la Plata and Orinoco streets. The second headquarters were ubicated in the crossing of Pilcomayo and Amazonas street. The third headquarters were located in the Orinoco and Amazonas streets. The fourth headquarters were ubicated in Michigan street, between Rambla and Orinoco. In this place, social events that the club organizes nowadays began to be organized, like dances and the Carnaval de Montevideo

The development of the club in the institutional aspects was accompanied by a growth in sports. Malvín advanced in the Federal Basketball Championship very fast, gaining its right to play in the First Division in 1942, consolidating itself as one of the most important teams in Uruguayan basketball.

In 1947, the construction of the club's stadium was initiated, mainly because the court in Amazonas street was not fit to the requirements of the time. The construction ended on August 30, 1952, with the grand opening of the stadium located in the crossing of the streets Avenida Legrand and Gallinal, with a capacity of 3,000.

In 1975, Malvín began a process of renovation that included the passing from amateur to professional basketball and the construction of the tennis courts, the gym and the open pool.

In the 90's, the club built its indoor gym, where the home games of the basketball championship are played nowadays.

== Present situation ==
In the beginning of the 21st century, Club Malvín appeared to be one of the most important institutions in Uruguay's sports. After the experience of the Órbita Malvín project, the club returned to its members' full control, not only to satisfy the population's needs for physical activity in one of the most important zones of Montevideo, but also to reach bigger achievements in basketball.

== Honours ==
Liga Uruguaya de Básquetbol champions (5 times):

- 2006–07 (3-1)
- 2010–11 (3-1)
- 2013–14 (4-1)
- 2014–15 (4-1)
- 2017–18 (4-3)

Club Malvín participated in the first division, or Liga Uruguaya de Básquetbol, 56 times since 1942. Besides the league championship of 2006–07, obtained with Pablo López as coach and important players like Fernando Martínez, Marcelo Pérez and Emilio Taboada; Malvín won the league four more times in 2011, 2014, 2015, and 2018. The club has also finished in second place in the 1971, 2010, 2012 and 2019 tournaments, and won several championships in the Second Division.
