= Andorra men's national basketball team =

Andorra
- FIBA ranking: 96 ▲2 (13 July 2026)
- Joined FIBA: 1988
- FIBA zone: FIBA Europe
- National federation: Federació Andorrana de Basquetbol
- Coach: Cristian Vegas

Olympic Games
- Appearances: None

FIBA World Cup
- Appearances: None

EuroBasket
- Appearances: None

Championship for Small Countries
- Appearances: 17
- Medals: (6) 1998, 2000, 2004, 2012, 2014, 2024 (4) 2010, 2016, 2021, 2026 (2) 2006, 2022

Games of the Small States of Europe
- Appearances: 14
- Medals: (1) 1989 (1) 2015
Home	Away

First international
- Andorra – Luxembourg (Serravalle, San Marino; 23 May 1985)

Biggest win
- Moldova 43–97 Andorra (Serravalle, San Marino; 30 June 2018)

Biggest defeat
- Cyprus 97–56 Andorra (Monaco; 6 June 2007); Andorra 49–90 Montenegro (Serravalle, San Marino; 31 May 2017)

The Andorra national basketball team is the national team of Andorra. The national team has always represented in the EuroBasket Division C. It also takes part well in Games of the Small States of Europe.

== History ==
Despite not joining FIBA until 1988, Andorra made its debut in the 1985 Games of the Small States of Europe where, after winning their first game ever against Luxembourg, finished in the last position after losing to Cyprus and Malta.

Andorra would come back to competition in 1989, where it achieved its first great success by winning the tournament at the 1989 Games of the Small States of Europe, played in Cyprus after beating the home team in the final by 54–52. In 1991, the team could not repeat success and ended in the fourth position of the 1991 edition, that Andorra hosted.

In 1994, Andorra would make its debut at the FIBA Promotion Cup. In its first participation, the team ended in the seventh position after losing all its five games.

Four years later, the team conquered its first Promotion Cup title by ending unbeaten in the 1998 edition. Andorra would repeat success in 2000 European Promotion Cup for Men for starting to be one of the top teams in the Promotion Cup, later renamed as European Championship for Small Countries.

In 2009, Andorra achieved the bronze medal at the 2009 Games of the Small States of Europe by taking advantage to Iceland in a three-way tie.

During the 2010s, Andorra always qualified for the final of the Championship for Small Countries, being only beaten by more powerful teams like Denmark or Armenia.

== Competitive record ==
=== At the Championship for Small Countries ===
Championship for Small Countries
Year	Position	Pld	W	L
(Malta) 1988	Did not enter			
(Wales) 1990	Did not enter			
(Cyprus) 1992	Did not enter			
(Republic of Ireland) 1994	8th	5	0	5
(San Marino) 1996	6th	5	1	4
(Gibraltar) 1998	1st place, gold medalist(s)	4	4	0
(Andorra) 2000	1st place, gold medalist(s)	5	5	0
(Malta) 2002	4th	5	2	3
(Andorra) 2004	1st place, gold medalist(s)	4	4	0
(Albania) 2006	3rd place, bronze medalist(s)	5	3	2
(Scotland) 2008	4th	5	2	3
(Malta) 2010	2nd place, silver medalist(s)	5	4	1
(San Marino) 2012	1st place, gold medalist(s)	4	4	0
(Gibraltar) 2014	1st place, gold medalist(s)	4	4	0
(Moldova) 2016	2nd place, silver medalist(s)	5	4	1
(San Marino) 2018	5th	4	2	2
(Republic of Ireland) 2021	2nd place, silver medalist(s)	4	3	1
(Malta) 2022	3rd place, bronze medalist(s)	5	3	2
(Andorra) 2024	1st place, gold medalist(s)	5	4	1
(Gibraltar) 2026	2nd place, silver medalist(s)	5	3	2
Total		79	52	27

=== At the Games of the Small States ===
Games of the Small States of Europe
Year	Position	Pld	W	L
(San Marino) 1985	4th	3	1	2
(Monaco) 1987	Did not enter			
(Cyprus) 1989	1st place, gold medalist(s)	3	3	0
(Andorra) 1991	4th	5	2	3
(Malta) 1993	4th	5	2	3
(Luxembourg) 1995	6th	3	0	3
(Iceland) 1997	6th	3	0	3
(San Marino) 2001	7th	3	0	3
(Malta) 2003	5th	4	2	2
(Andorra) 2005	5th	4	0	4
(Monaco) 2007	4th	5	1	4
(Cyprus) 2009	3rd place, bronze medalist(s)	5	3	2
(Luxembourg) 2013	4th	4	1	3
(Iceland) 2015	4th	3	0	3
(San Marino) 2017	5th	5	2	3
(Montenegro) 2019	Did not enter			
Total		55	17	38

== Roster ==
This was the Andorran list for the 2026 FIBA European Championship for Small Countries.

Andorra men's national basketball team - 2026 FIBA European Championship for Small Countries roster
Players
Coaches

Pos.	No.	Name	Age – Date of birth	Height	Club
PG	4	Sergi Serrato	24 – 9 June 2002	1.78 m (5 ft 10 in)	Óbila	(Spain)
C	5	Joan Aguilar	19 – 8 November 2006	1.89 m (6 ft 2 in)	Andorra	(Andorra)
PF	6	Alejandro Aramda	22 – 22 June 2004	1.90 m (6 ft 3 in)	Andorra	(Andorra)
PG	7	Ken Santiago	18 – 24 July 2007	1.80 m (5 ft 11 in)	Andorra	(Andorra)
PF	8	Gerard Lamelas	17 – 6 March 2009	1.90 m (6 ft 3 in)	Andorra	(Andorra)
F	11	Izan Fernandez	17 – 2 November 2008	1.87 m (6 ft 2 in)	Andorra	(Andorra)
PF	13	Leonardo López	22 – 15 April 2004	2.02 m (6 ft 8 in)	Ontinyent	(Spain)
PF	14	Àlex Peral	25 – 12 July 2000	1.98 m (6 ft 6 in)	Sedis	(Spain)
C	15	Cinto Gabriel	39 – 19 June 1987	2.00 m (6 ft 7 in)	Espanyol	(Spain)
PF	17	Ignasi Armengol	19 – 19 February 2007	1.93 m (6 ft 4 in)	Andorra	(Andorra)
C	22	Mathis Mulard	20 – 6 June 2006	1.99 m (6 ft 6 in)	Andorra	(Andorra)
C	44	Biel Gallego	18 – 1 February 2008	1.95 m (6 ft 5 in)	Andorra	(Andorra)

Head coach

- (Andorra) Cristian Vegas

Legend

- Age – describes age
  on 28 June 2026

== Head to head against other national basketball teams ==
- Included all FIBA competitions and all GSSE editions.
- Updated as of 31 June 2024.

Team	GP	W	L	Pct.
Albania	2	0	2	.000
Armenia	3	1	2	.333
Austria	1	0	1	.000
Azerbaijan	3	3	0	1.000
Cyprus	10	1	9	.100
Denmark	1	0	1	.000
Gibraltar	14	12	2	.857
Ireland	2	0	2	.000
Iceland	13	2	11	.154
Luxembourg	11	4	7	.364
Malta	20	14	6	.700
Moldova	9	7	2	.778
Monaco	3	2	1	.667
Montenegro	2	0	2	.000
San Marino	20	13	7	.650
Scotland	7	2	5	.286
Wales	8	5	3	.625
Total	129	66	63	.512

== Individual records ==
- **Bold** denotes players who played the 2021 FIBA European Championship for Small Countries.
- FIBA Championships included since 1998, GSSE included since 2009 and the 2003 edition.

As of 15 August 2021

=== Most capped players ===
#	Player	National career	Matches	Points
1	Felip de Oliveira	2000–2017	59	311
2	Daniel Marín	1998–2015	53	872
3	Xavier Galera	2000–2015	50	520
4	Cinto Gabriel	2008–2018	43	385
5	Oriol Fernández	2008–2017	40	268
6	**Guillem Colom**	2010–	33	423
7	Albert Farfan	2010–2017	30	223
8	Sergio Salesa	1998–2006	27	261
9	Héctor Grau	1998–2006	24	95
10	Rafael Casals	2009–2015	23	270
10	**Xavier Isern**	2006–	23	22

=== Top scorers ===
#	Player	National career	Points	Matches	Average
1	Daniel Marín	1998–2015	872	53	16.5
2	Xavier Galera	2000–2015	520	50	10.4
3	**Guillem Colom**	2010–	423	33	12.8
4	Cinto Gabriel	2008–2018	385	43	9.0
5	Felip de Oliveira	2000–2017	311	59	5.3
6	Antonio Jiménez	1998–2002	301	11	27.4
7	Rafael Casals	2009–2015	270	23	11.7
8	Oriol Fernández	2008–2017	268	40	6.7
9	Sergio Salesa	1998–2006	261	27	9.7
10	Albert Farfan	2010–2017	223	30	7.4

== Notable players ==
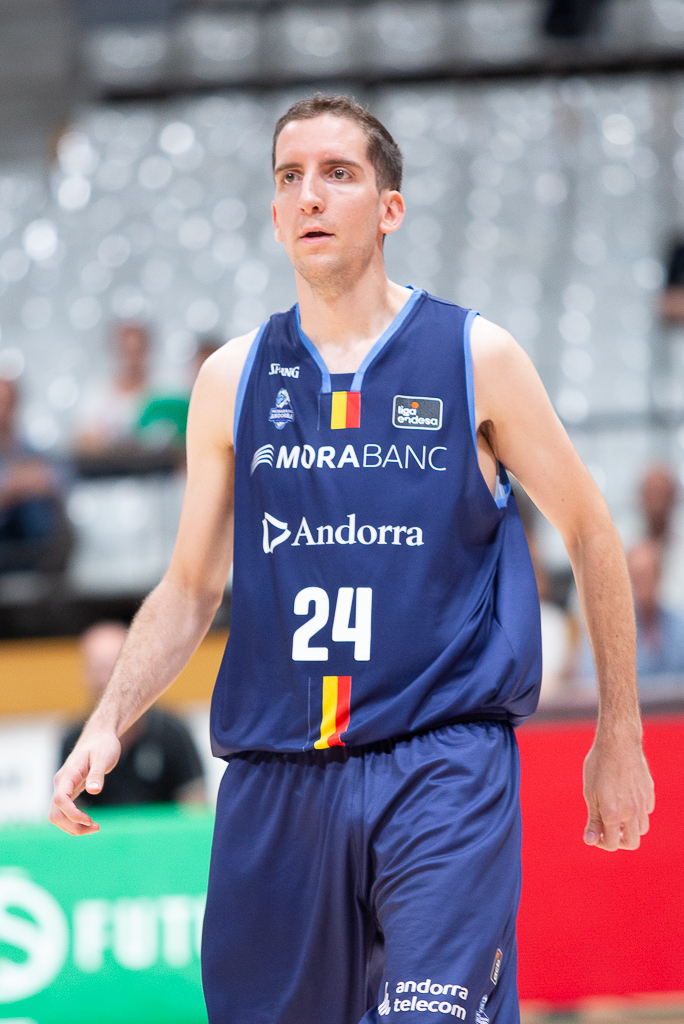
Guillem Colom

- Quino Colom (youth teams)
- Pere Pràxedes
- Guillem Colom
- David Navarro

== Progression in the FIBA World Ranking ==
Date	Change	Pos.	Points
11 Oct 2017	Steady	88th	27.6
28 Nov 2017	▼3	91st	27.6
28 Feb 2018	▼15	106th	22.9
3 Jul 2018	▲6	100th	33.8
18 Sep 2018	▲6	94th	60.4
4 Dec 2018	▲11	83rd	113.6
26 Feb 2019	▲2	81st	113.6
16 Sep 2019	▲4	77th	113.6
3 Mar 2020	▼1	78th	110.9
2 Mar 2021	▼2	80th	110.9
30 Nov 2021	▼19	99th	95.91
1 Mar 2022	▲12	87th	110.2
18 Nov 2022	▼11	98th	92.8
27 Feb 2024	▼4	94th	97.2
26 Nov 2024	▼2	96th	94.4
25 Feb 2025	▼1	97th	94.4
28 Mar 2025	▲1	96th	94.4
2 Dec 2025	▲2	94th	94.4
3 Mar 2026	▼3	97th	94.4

== See also ==
- Andorra men's national under-18 basketball team
- Andorra men's national under-16 basketball team
