= 2026 FIBA European Championship for Small Countries =

Tournament details
- Host country: Gibraltar
- Dates: 23–28 June 2026
- Teams: 4 (from 1 confederation)
- Venue: 1 (in 1 host city)

Final positions
- Champions: Malta (2nd title)
- Runners-up: Andorra
- Third place: Gibraltar

Tournament statistics
- MVP: (Malta) Jordan Tucker

Official website
- www.fiba.basketball

The 2026 FIBA European Championship for Small Countries was the 20th edition of this competition. The tournament was played in Gibraltar, from 23 to 28 June 2026.

Malta secured their second overall title with a victory over Andorra in the final, 90–76.

== Participating teams ==
Team	WR (Note: As of March 2026)
Andorra	98
Gibraltar	125
Malta	101
San Marino	111

== First round ==
The draw of the first round was held on 5 February 2026 in Freising, Germany.

In the first round, the teams played a round-robin tournament in one group. All teams advanced to the playoffs.

Pos	Team	Pld	W	L	PF	PA	PD	Pts
1	Malta	3	3	0	286	187	+99	6
2	Andorra	3	2	1	235	211	+24	5
3	Gibraltar (H)	3	1	2	183	234	−51	4
4	San Marino	3	0	3	208	280	−72	3

Source: FIBA
(H) Hosts

All times are local (Central European Summer Time; UTC+2).

23 June 2026
19:30

Boxscore

Gibraltar	70–61	San Marino
Scoring by quarter: 21–14, 18–16, 19–17, 12–14
Pts: McGrail 26; Rebs: El Yettefti 10; Asts: McGrail 4		Pts: Ugolini 26; Rebs: Ugolini 8 Asts: Macina 8

Tercentenary Sports Hall, Gibraltar
Attendance: 500
Referees: Igor Esteve Malmierca (AND), Jürgen Muho (LUX), Luka Brekalo (BIH)

23 June 2026
17:00

Boxscore

Andorra	52–82	Malta
Scoring by quarter: 18–11, 15–24, 12–23, 11–24
Pts: Calzada 12; Rebs: Aguilar 6 Asts: Balletbo 4		Pts: Tucker 28; Rebs: Cassar 8 Asts: Cassar 3

Tercentenary Sports Hall, Gibraltar
Attendance: 45
Referees: Martin Vulić (CRO), Andrea Bongiorni (ITA), James Kerry Dominique (GIB)

24 June 2026
19:30

Boxscore

Malta	93–63	Gibraltar
Scoring by quarter: 22–12, 24–26, 26–10, 21–15
Pts: Pace 16; Rebs: Sjoberg 11; Asts: Pace 5		Pts: Yome 15; Rebs: Tejon, El Yettefti 7 Asts: four players 1

Tercentenary Sports Hall, Gibraltar
Attendance: 250
Referees: Andrea Bongiorni (ITA), Igor Esteve Malmierca (AND), Luka Brekalo (BIH)

24 June 2026
17:00

Boxscore

San Marino	79–99	Andorra
Scoring by quarter: 27–22, 19–36, 19–25, 14–16
Pts: Macina 22; Rebs: Cadiman 7 Asts: Macina 3		Pts: Balletbo 29; Rebs: Gabriel 11; Asts: Balletbo 7

Tercentenary Sports Hall, Gibraltar
Attendance: 20
Referees: Martin Vulić (CRO), James Kerry Dominique (GIB), Jürgen Muho (LUX)

25 June 2026
17:00

Boxscore

Malta	111–68	San Marino
Scoring by quarter: 20–14, 30–12, 32–25, 29–17
Pts: Gouder, K. Cassar 21; Rebs: Gouder 9 Asts: N. Cassar 7		Pts: Ugolini, Cadiman 17; Rebs: Merlini 8 Asts: Riccardi 4

Tercentenary Sports Hall, Gibraltar
Attendance: 25
Referees: Martin Vulić (CRO), Igor Esteve Malmierca (AND), James Kerry Dominique (GIB)

25 June 2026
19:30

Boxscore

Gibraltar	50–80	Andorra
Scoring by quarter: 11–30, 12–25, 17–13, 10–12
Pts: Tejon 14; Rebs: El Yettefti 11; Asts: six players 1		Pts: Balletbo 17; Rebs: Gabriel 12; Asts: Armengol 4

Tercentenary Sports Hall, Gibraltar
Attendance: 250
Referees: Andrea Bongiorni (ITA), Luka Brekalo (BIH), Jürgen Muho (LUX)

== Playoffs ==
=== Bracket ===
Semifinals
27 June
Malta	99
San Marino	60
27 June
Andorra	91
Gibraltar	42

Final
28 June
Malta	90
Andorra	76
3rd place game
28 June
San Marino	67
Gibraltar	72

=== Semifinals ===
27 June 2026
17:00

Boxscore

Andorra	91–42	Gibraltar
Scoring by quarter: 17–17, 34–9, 19–8, 21–8
Pts: Armengol 14; Rebs: Calzada 7 Asts: Serrato 6		Pts: McGrail 17; Rebs: Gomez 5 Asts: Yome 3

Tercentenary Sports Hall, Gibraltar
Attendance: 101
Referees: Martin Vulić (CRO), Andrea Bongiorni (ITA), Jürgen Muho (LUX)

27 June 2026
19:30

Boxscore

Malta	99–60	San Marino
Scoring by quarter: 18–14, 23–17, 24–21, 34–8
Pts: Tucker 28; Rebs: Tucker 8 Asts: Tucker 4		Pts: Ugolini 14; Rebs: Biordi 7 Asts: Macina 4

Tercentenary Sports Hall, Gibraltar
Attendance: 40
Referees: Igor Esteve Malmierca (AND), Igor Esteve Malmierca (AND), Luka Brekalo (BIH)

=== 3rd place game ===
28 June 2026
17:00

Boxscore

San Marino	67–72	Gibraltar
Scoring by quarter: 15–21, 21–19, 12–14, 19–18
Pts: Ugolini 25; Rebs: Cadiman 10; Asts: Macina, Ugolini 4		Pts: Tejon 15; Rebs: Tejon 9 Asts: Yome 6

Tercentenary Sports Hall, Gibraltar
Attendance: 200
Referees: Igor Esteve Malmierca (AND), Luka Brekalo (BIH), Jürgen Muho (LUX)

=== Final ===
28 June 2026
19:30

Boxscore

Malta	90–76	Andorra
Scoring by quarter: 18–14, 16–21, 20–18, 36–23
Pts: Tucker 25; Rebs: four players 8 Asts: Tucker 5		Pts: Serrato 22; Rebs: Calzada 9 Asts: Armengol 6

Tercentenary Sports Hall, Gibraltar
Attendance: 100
Referees: Martin Vulić (CRO), Andrea Bongiorni (ITA), James Kerry Dominique (GIB)

== Final standings ==
Rank	Team	Record
1st place, gold medalist(s)	Malta	5–0
2nd place, silver medalist(s)	Andorra	3–2
3rd place, bronze medalist(s)	Gibraltar	2–3
4th	San Marino	0–5

== Statistics and awards ==
=== Awards ===
The All-Tournament team and MVP award was announced on 28 June 2026.

All-Tournament Team
Guard	Forwards	Centers
(Andorra) Sergi Serrato Balletbo (Gibraltar) Jamie McGrail	(San Marino) Pietro Ugolini (Malta) Jordan Tucker	(Malta) Kurt Cassar
MVP: (Malta) Jordan Tucker
