= 2002 European Promotion Cup for Men =

Tournament details
- Host country: Malta
- City: Ta' Qali
- Dates: 11–15 June 2002
- Teams: 8 (from 1 confederation)
- Venue(s): 1 (in 1 host city)

Final positions
- Champions: San Marino (1st title)
- Runners-up: Wales
- Third place: Scotland

Official website
- www.fibaeurope.com

The 2002 European Promotion Cup for Men was the 8th edition of this tournament. It was hosted in Ta' Qali, Malta and San Marino achieved its first title ever after beating Wales in the final game.

== Preliminary round ==
=== Group A ===
Pos	Team	Pld	W	L	PF	PA	PD	Pts	Qualification	(Scotland)	(San Marino)	(Albania)	(Malta)
1	Scotland	3	2	1	250	220	+30	5	Semifinals	—	62–66		
2	San Marino	3	2	1	227	200	+27	5	Semifinals		—		84–60
3	Albania	3	2	1	245	229	+16	5	Classification games	80–92	78–77	—	
4	Malta (H)	3	0	3	194	267	−73	3	Classification games	74–96		60–87	—

Source: Archive FIBA
(H) Hosts

=== Group B ===
Pos	Team	Pld	W	L	PF	PA	PD	Pts	Qualification	(Andorra)	(Wales)	(Moldova)	(Gibraltar)
1	Andorra	3	2	1	267	216	+51	5	Semifinals	—			100–56
2	Wales	3	2	1	230	198	+32	5	Semifinals	73–72	—	63–67	
3	Moldova	3	2	1	248	216	+32	5	Classification games	87–95		—	
4	Gibraltar	3	0	3	173	288	−115	3	Classification games		59–94	58–94	—

Source: Archive FIBA

== Classification games ==
Semifinals
Malta	44
Moldova	76
Gibraltar	73
Albania	94

Final
Moldova	95
Albania	93
Third place
Malta	81
Gibraltar	68

== Final round ==
=== Bracket ===
Semifinals
San Marino	78
Andorra	77
Wales	67
Scotland	53

Final
San Marino	82
Wales	70
Third place
Andorra	80
Scotland	94

=== Final ===
15 June 2002

Boxscore

San Marino	82–70	Wales
Scoring by quarter: 21–13, 19–21, 21–15, 21–21
Pts: Rossini 26; Rebs: Rossini 8 Asts: Raschi, Rossini 4		Pts: Robbins 19; Rebs: Robbins 13; Asts: Hall 6

Ta'Qali

== Final ranking ==
Rank	Team	Record
1st place, gold medalist(s)	San Marino	4–1
2nd place, silver medalist(s)	Wales	3–2
3rd place, bronze medalist(s)	Scotland	3–2
4	Andorra	2–3
5	Moldova	4–1
6	Albania	3–2
7	Malta	1–4
8	Gibraltar	0–5
