= 1996 European Promotion Cup for Men =

Tournament details
- Host country: San Marino
- City: Serravalle
- Dates: 5–9 June 1996
- Teams: 8 (from 1 confederation)
- Venue(s): 1 (in 1 host city)

Final positions
- Champions: Austria (2nd title)
- Runners-up: Norway
- Third place: San Marino

Official website
- www.fibaeurope.com

The 1996 European Promotion Cup for Men was the 5th edition of this tournament. It was hosted in Serravalle, San Marino and Austria achieved their second title after beating Norway in the final game.

== Preliminary round ==
=== Group A ===
Pos	Team	Pld	W	L	PF	PA	PD	Pts	Qualification	(Norway)	(San Marino)	(Gibraltar)	(Malta)
1	Norway	3	3	0	255	170	+85	6	Semifinals	—	80–72	81–47	
2	San Marino (H)	3	2	1	260	197	+63	5	Semifinals		—		85–59
3	Gibraltar	3	1	2	195	260	−65	4	Classification games		58–103	—	
4	Malta	3	0	3	186	269	−83	3	Classification games	51–94		76–90	—

Source: Archive FIBA
(H) Hosts

=== Group B ===
Pos	Team	Pld	W	L	PF	PA	PD	Pts	Qualification	(Austria)	(Wales)	(Scotland)	(Andorra)
1	Austria	3	3	0	249	182	+67	6	Semifinals	—		72–50	91–75
2	Wales	3	2	1	222	233	−11	5	Semifinals	57–86	—		89–83
3	Scotland	3	1	2	189	197	−8	4	Classification games		64–76	—	
4	Andorra	3	0	3	207	255	−48	3	Classification games			49–75	—

Source: Archive FIBA

== Classification games ==
5th–8th place semifinals
Malta	37
Scotland	67
Andorra	85
Gibraltar	74

5th place match
Scotland	77
Andorra	71
7th place match
Malta	93
Gibraltar	84

== Final round ==
=== Bracket ===
Semifinals
San Marino	72
Austria	82
Wales	85
Norway	113

Final
Austria	54
Norway	52
3rd place match
San Marino	85
Wales	70

=== Final ===
9 June 2016
18:00

Boxscore

Austria	54–52	Norway
Scoring by half: 22–31, 32–21

Serravalle, San Marino
Referees: Zoran Grbac (CRO), Joseph Hernández (GIB)

== Final standings ==
Rank	Team	Record
1st place, gold medalist(s)	Austria	5–0
2nd place, silver medalist(s)	Norway	4–1
3rd place, bronze medalist(s)	San Marino	3–2
4	Wales	2–3
5	Scotland	3–2
6	Andorra	1–4
7	Malta	1–4
8	Gibraltar	1–4
