= 2000 European Promotion Cup for Men =

Tournament details
- Host country: Andorra
- City: Andorra la Vella
- Dates: 6–10 June 2000
- Teams: 6 (from 1 confederation)
- Venue(s): 1 (in 1 host city)

Final positions
- Champions: Andorra (2nd title)
- Runners-up: San Marino
- Third place: Scotland

Official website
- www.fibaeurope.com

The 2000 European Promotion Cup for Men was the 7th edition of this tournament. It was hosted in Andorra la Vella, Andorra and Andorra men's national basketball team retained their title after winning all their five games.

== Standings ==
Pos	Team	Pld	W	L	PF	PA	PD	Pts	(Andorra)	(San Marino)	(Scotland)	(Wales)	(Malta)	(Gibraltar)
1	Andorra (H, C)	5	5	0	394	333	+61	10	—			74–72		82–59
2	San Marino	5	4	1	375	303	+72	9	61–69	—			74–55	86–51
3	Scotland	5	2	3	366	341	+25	7	76–79	64–81	—	58–66		
4	Wales	5	2	3	354	343	+11	7		64–73		—		86–64
5	Malta	5	2	3	338	368	−30	7	65–90		61–71	74–66	—	
6	Gibraltar	5	0	5	295	434	−139	5			54–97		67–83	—

Source: FIBA Europe
(C) Champions; (H) Hosts
