= 1998 European Promotion Cup for Men =

Tournament details
- Host country: Gibraltar
- Dates: 2–6 June 1998
- Teams: 5 (from 1 confederation)
- Venue(s): 1 (in 1 host city)

Final positions
- Champions: Andorra (1st title)
- Runners-up: Wales
- Third place: San Marino

Official website
- www.fibaeurope.com

The 1998 European Promotion Cup for Men was the 6th edition of this tournament. It was hosted in Gibraltar and Andorra men's national basketball team won their first title ever.

== Standings ==
Pos	Team	Pld	W	L	PF	PA	PD	Pts	(Andorra)	(Wales)	(San Marino)	(Gibraltar)	(Malta)
1	Andorra (C)	4	4	0	348	292	+56	8	—	84–81	90–74		
2	Wales	4	3	1	353	286	+67	7		—		93–66	92–58
3	San Marino	4	2	2	304	296	+8	6		78–87	—		69–61
4	Gibraltar (H)	4	1	3	276	344	−68	5	76–94		58–83	—	
5	Malta	4	0	4	254	317	−63	4	61–80			74–76	—

Source: FIBA Europe
(C) Champions; (H) Hosts
