= FIBA EuroBasket 2010 Division C =

Tournament details
- Host country: Malta
- City: Valletta
- Dates: 5–10 July 2010
- Teams: 8 (from 1 confederation)
- Venue(s): 1 (in 1 host city)

Final positions
- Champions: Denmark (1st title)
- Runners-up: Andorra
- Third place: Malta

Official website
- www.fibaeurope.com

The FIBA EuroBasket 2010 Division C was the 12th edition of this event, the third tier (lowest) of the bi-annual FIBA EuroBasket competition. The tournament was played in Valletta, Malta, from 5 to 10 July 2010. Denmark men's national basketball team became the Division C champions for the first time.

== Participating teams ==
- Andorra
- Denmark
- Gibraltar
- Malta
- Moldova
- San Marino
- Scotland
- Wales

== First round ==
In the first round, the teams were drawn into two groups. The first two teams from each group advance to the semifinals, the other teams will play in the 5th–8th place playoffs.

=== Group A ===
Pos	Team	Pld	W	L	PF	PA	PD	Pts	Qualification
1	Andorra	3	3	0	253	178	+75	6	Semifinals
2	Moldova	3	1	2	205	174	+31	4	Semifinals
3	Wales	3	1	2	179	210	−31	4	5th–8th place playoffs
4	Gibraltar	3	1	2	156	231	−75	4	5th–8th place playoffs

Source: FIBA Archive

5 July 2010

Boxscore

Andorra	73–70	Moldova

5 July 2010

Boxscore

Wales	58–68	Gibraltar

6 July 2010

Boxscore

Moldova	55–64	Wales

6 July 2010

Boxscore

Gibraltar	51–93	Andorra

7 July 2010

Boxscore

Moldova	80–37	Gibraltar

7 July 2010

Boxscore

Wales	57–87	Andorra

=== Group B ===
Pos	Team	Pld	W	L	PF	PA	PD	Pts	Qualification
1	Denmark	3	3	0	269	178	+91	6	Semifinals
2	Malta	3	2	1	245	213	+32	5	Semifinals
3	Scotland	3	1	2	227	246	−19	4	5th–8th place playoffs
4	San Marino	3	0	3	157	261	−104	3	5th–8th place playoffs

Source: FIBA Archive

5 July 2010

Boxscore

Scotland	68–88	Denmark

5 July 2010

Boxscore

Malta	83–51	San Marino

6 July 2010

Boxscore

Denmark	86–73	Malta

6 July 2010

Boxscore

San Marino	69–83	Scotland

7 July 2010

Boxscore

Denmark	95–37	San Marino

7 July 2010

Boxscore

Malta	89–76	Scotland

== 5th–8th place playoffs ==
5th–8th place semifinals
Wales	79
San Marino	47
Scotland	78
Gibraltar	42

5th place match
Wales	75
Scotland	49
7th place match
San Marino	81
Gibraltar	89

=== 5th–8th place semifinals ===
9 July 2010

Boxscore

Wales	79–47	San Marino

9 July 2010

Boxscore

Scotland	78–42	Gibraltar

=== 7th place match ===
10 July 2010

Boxscore

San Marino	81–89	Gibraltar

=== 5th place match ===
10 July 2010

Boxscore

Wales	75–49	Scotland

== Championship playoffs ==
Semifinals
Andorra	82
Malta	60
Denmark	88
Moldova	69

Final
Andorra	69
Denmark	87
3rd place match
Malta	85
Moldova	77

=== Semifinals ===
9 July 2010

Boxscore

Denmark	88–69	Moldova

9 July 2010

Boxscore

Andorra	82–60	Malta

=== 3rd place match ===
10 July 2010

Boxscore

Malta	85–77	Moldova

=== Final ===
10 July 2010

Boxscore

Andorra	69–87	Denmark

== Final standings ==
Rank	Team
1st place, gold medalist(s)	Denmark
2nd place, silver medalist(s)	Andorra
3rd place, bronze medalist(s)	Malta
4	Moldova
5	Wales
6	Scotland
7	Gibraltar
8	San Marino
