= Albania men's national basketball team =

Men's national basketball team representing Albania

Albania
- FIBA ranking: 96 ▼1 (1 September 2026)
- Joined FIBA: 1947
- FIBA zone: FIBA Europe
- National federation: FSHB
- Coach: Ricardo González Dávila
- Nickname(s): Kuq e Zinjtë (The Red and Blacks); Shqiponjat (The Eagles)

FIBA World Cup
- Appearances: None

EuroBasket
- Appearances: 2 (first in 1947)
- Medals: None
Home	Away

First international
- Italy 60–15 Albania (Prague, Czechoslovakia; 27 April 1947)

Biggest win
- Albania 112–77 Iceland (Wolfenbüttel, West Germany; 15 May 1975)

Biggest defeat
- Belgium 114–11 Albania (Prague, Czechoslovakia; 28 April 1947)

The Albania men's national basketball team (Albanian: Kombëtarja e basketbollit të Shqipërisë) represents Albania in international basketball competitions. The national team is governed by the Albanian Basketball Federation.

Albania has competed at the EuroBasket twice throughout their history, in 1947 and 1957. While the team has appeared on the continental level in the past, Albania still looks to obtain qualification to reach the FIBA World Cup.

== History ==
=== 20th century ===
Basketball was introduced in Albania in the early 20th century, and it became popular in the 1920s, following the end of World War I. Sports clubs were being formed all over the country, and basketball was soon introduced to the major towns and cities in Albania. It was played informally by teams representing different sports clubs, and it wasn't until September 1945 that a National Basketball Committee was formed, that would be responsible for dealing with the issues basketball teams in the country faced. The committee paved the way for the creation of the Albanian Basketball Federation a year later in 1946, which became a member of FIBA in 1947. Their main goals were to enable clubs to compete in national competitions, as well as to promote the sport. The first National Championship in Albania was held in 1946, and a year later the first Women's National Championship also took place. In 1951, the federation created the Republic's Cup, which was a competition open to all professional and amateur basketball clubs in Albania, with the women's and youth versions of the competition both starting in 1952. During the Communist regime in Albania, the National Spartakiad was held between 1959 and 1989, where basketball was one of the more popular sports on display at the country's biggest sports events. In 1999, the federation held the first Albanian Basketball Supercups for men and women, which is played between the winners of the league and cup.

Albania first competed in a European Championship at EuroBasket 1947 held in Prague, Czechoslovakia, shortly after joining FIBA as an affiliate national team. In the preliminary round of the competition, Albania was placed in Group D, with Italy, Belgium and Egypt. Albania's first game in a major tournament came against Italy, which was a 60–15 loss. In their next two matches, Albania would suffer heavy defeats at the hands of Belgium 114–11 and to Egypt 19–104. In the next round, Albania were placed in the lower bracket Group 3 to determine who finishes between 7th and 10th place. There, the national team were up against Romania and Austria. Albania would go on to lose 19–73 to Romania and 27–44 to Austria. The team then went on to face Yugoslavia in the final game to determine 13th and 14th place, where they would lose 13–90 to Yugoslavia to finish in last place out of 14 teams. During the tournament, Albania registered a record of (0–6), while averaging just 17.3 points per game. Their highest point tally came against Austria where they scored 27 points, which was also the match where the team had its smallest margin of defeat at 17 points. Albania conceded an average of 80.3 points per game, with their highest scoring opponent being Belgium.

Ten years after their debut tournament appearance at the Euros, Albania competed at EuroBasket 1957 in Sofia, Bulgaria. Albania were placed in Group A in the preliminary round with Czechoslovakia, Yugoslavia and Scotland. The national team lost 57–89 to Yugoslavia in their opening match, and then went on to lose 71–37 to Czechoslovakia and 65–42 against Scotland to finish bottom of the group. During the classification round, Albania faced Turkey, Italy, Finland, Belgium, West Germany, Austria and Scotland. Albania would lose all seven games in the classification round, which sent the team toward finishing at the bottom of another EuroBasket tournament, this time out of 16 teams. Albania during the competition averaged 47.6 points per game, with their highest points tally coming against Turkey in a 64–97 defeat. Albania conceded an average of 78.4 points per game during their ten games played at the event. Despite putting up better statistical numbers than those in 1947, Albania could not manage to earn a victory at the Euros for the second consecutive tournament.

After EuroBasket 1957, Albania failed to reach a major tournament again throughout the rest of the 20th century. Although the national team did go on to attempt to qualify on numerous occasions, including for the 1972 Summer Olympics. That was where Albania competed in qualification to reach the Olympic Games for the first time. However, the team was defeated in all three of its games during qualifying to come up short. Also, during qualifying for EuroBasket 1975, where Albania put up record feats in their attempt to make it back on to the continental stage. It was where the team earned their highest margin of victory versus an opponent to that point, against Iceland 112–77; as well as earning their first three game winning streak. Although even behind heroic performances, Albania would narrowly miss out on clinching qualification.

=== 21st century ===
In 2002, Albania entered a smaller competition, the 2002 European Championship for Small Countries. Albania would begin the tournament in Group A, where the team would eventually earn a (2–1) record. However, due to point differential, Albania missed out on advancing to the knockout phase and were relegated to the classification round. There, the team defeated Gibraltar, but lost to Moldova to finish the tournament in sixth place.

After achieving nearly similar results at the competition in 2004, Albania were poised to change the narrative at the 2006 tournament. The national team quickly set the tone, as they went undefeated (3–0) in the group stage to advance. In the semis, Albania won a high scoring affair against Andorra 111–101, to send the team into the final. Although the team would fall short of winning the competition, losing a tightly contested match to Azerbaijan to finish as the runners-up.

Entering qualification for EuroBasket 2017, Albania struggled to a (1–5) record during the qualifiers, picking up their lone victory against Slovakia and missing out to qualify. During the process for Albania to qualify for the 2019 FIBA World Cup, the national team went through European Pre-Qualifiers. However, Albania were overwhelmed in all four of their matches in the pre-qualifying stage, and failed to advance.

Following Albania's lost attempt to qualify for the 2019 World Cup, the team directed their attention toward EuroBasket 2022 qualifying. Although Albania would display similar results which caused the team to miss out on the World Cup, and being eliminated. Albania began their European Pre-Qualifiers campaign for the 2023 FIBA World Cup, dropping their first match 70–62 against Portugal, before defeating Cyprus 71–64. However, in Albania's final four games of the round, they suffered heavy losses in each match, to finish with a record of (1–5), and failing to advance. Albania went through EuroBasket 2025 qualifying, where they were eventually eliminated, finishing with a (1–7) record. In February 2024, Albania entered European Pre-Qualifiers for the 2027 FIBA World Cup. They were eliminated in the first round, after finishing at the bottom of their group, with a record of (1–3).

== Competitive record ==
=== FIBA World Cup ===
World Cup					Qualification		
Year	Position	Pld	W	L	Pld	W	L
(Argentina) 1950	Did not enter				Did not enter		
(Brazil) 1954	Did not enter				Did not enter		
(Chile) 1959	Did not enter				Did not enter		
(Brazil) 1963	Did not enter				Did not enter		
(Uruguay) 1967	Did not enter				Did not enter		
(Socialist Federal Republic of Yugoslavia) 1970	Did not qualify				EuroBasket served as qualifiers		
(Puerto Rico) 1974	Did not qualify				EuroBasket served as qualifiers		
(Philippines) 1978	Did not enter				Did not enter		
(Colombia) 1982	Did not enter				Did not enter		
(Spain) 1986	Did not qualify				6	0	6
(Argentina) 1990	Did not enter				Did not enter		
(Canada) 1994	Did not qualify				EuroBasket served as qualifiers		
(Greece) 1998	Did not qualify				EuroBasket served as qualifiers		
(United States) 2002	Did not enter				Did not enter		
(Japan) 2006	Did not qualify				EuroBasket served as qualifiers		
(Turkey) 2010	Did not qualify				EuroBasket served as qualifiers		
(Spain) 2014	Did not qualify				EuroBasket served as qualifiers		
(China) 2019	Did not qualify				4	0	4
(Philippines) (Japan) (Indonesia) 2023	Did not qualify				6	1	5
(Qatar) 2027	Did not qualify				4	1	3
(France) 2031	To be determined				To be determined		
Total	0/20				20	2	18

=== Olympic Games ===
Olympic Games					Qualifying		
Year	Position	Pld	W	L	Pld	W	L
(Nazi Germany) 1936	No national representative						
(United Kingdom) 1948	Did not enter						
(Finland) 1952	Did not enter						
(Australia) 1956	Did not enter						
(Italy) 1960	Did not enter				Did not enter		
(Japan) 1964	Did not enter				Did not enter		
(Mexico) 1968	Did not enter				Did not enter		
(West Germany) 1972	Did not qualify				3	0	3
(Canada) 1976	Did not enter				Did not enter		
(Soviet Union) 1980	Did not enter				Did not enter		
(United States) 1984	Did not enter				Did not enter		
(South Korea) 1988	Did not enter				Did not enter		
(Spain) 1992	Did not qualify				6	1	5
(United States) 1996	Did not qualify				Did not qualify		
(Australia) 2000	Did not qualify				Did not qualify		
(Greece) 2004	Did not qualify				Did not qualify		
(China) 2008	Did not qualify				Did not qualify		
(United Kingdom) 2012	Did not qualify				Did not qualify		
(Brazil) 2016	Did not qualify				Did not qualify		
(Japan) 2020	Did not qualify				Did not qualify		
(France) 2024	Did not qualify				Did not qualify		
(United States) 2028	Did not qualify				Did not qualify		
Total	0/21				9	1	8

=== Championship for Small Countries ===
FIBA European Championship for Small Countries
Year	Position	Pld	W	L
(Malta) 2002	6th	5	3	2
(Andorra) 2004	5th	5	3	2
(Albania) 2006	2nd place, silver medalist(s)	5	4	1
Total		15	10	5

=== EuroBasket ===
EuroBasket					Qualification		
Year	Position	Pld	W	L	Pld	W	L
(Switzerland) 1935	No national representative						
(Latvia) 1937	No national representative						
(Lithuania) 1939	No national representative						
(Switzerland) 1946	No national representative						
(Czechoslovakia) 1947	14th	6	0	6			
(Egypt) 1949	Did not enter						
(France) 1951	Did not enter						
(Soviet Union) 1953	Did not enter						
(Hungary) 1955	Did not enter						
(Bulgaria) 1957	16th	10	0	10			
(Turkey) 1959	Did not enter						
(Socialist Federal Republic of Yugoslavia) 1961	Did not enter						
(Poland) 1963	Did not enter				Did not enter		
(Soviet Union) 1965	Did not enter				Did not enter		
(Finland) 1967	Did not enter				Did not enter		
(Italy) 1969	Did not qualify				4	0	4
(West Germany) 1971	Did not qualify				4	1	3
(Spain) 1973	Did not enter				Did not enter		
(Socialist Federal Republic of Yugoslavia) 1975	Did not qualify				5	3	2
(Belgium) 1977	Did not enter				Did not enter		
(Italy) 1979	Did not enter				Did not enter		
(Czechoslovakia) 1981	Did not enter				Did not enter		
(France) 1983	Did not enter				Did not enter		
(West Germany) 1985	Did not enter				Did not enter		
(Greece) 1987	Did not enter				Did not enter		
(Socialist Federal Republic of Yugoslavia) 1989	Did not enter				Did not enter		
(Italy) 1991	Did not qualify				4	1	3
(Germany) 1993	Did not enter				Did not enter		
(Greece) 1995	Did not qualify				6	1	5
(Spain) 1997	Did not qualify				5	1	4
(France) 1999	Did not qualify				5	1	4
(Turkey) 2001	Did not enter				Did not enter		
(Sweden) 2003	Did not enter				Did not enter		
(Serbia and Montenegro) 2005	Division B				6	0	6
(Spain) 2007	Division B				8	0	8
(Poland) 2009	Division B				8	2	6
(Lithuania) 2011	Division B				8	0	8
(Slovenia) 2013	Did not qualify				8	0	8
(France) (Croatia) (Germany) (Latvia) 2015	Did not enter				Did not enter		
(Finland) (Israel) (Romania) (Turkey) 2017	Did not qualify				6	1	5
(Czech Republic) (Georgia (country)) (Italy) (Germany) 2022	Did not qualify				8	0	8
(Cyprus) (Finland) (Poland) (Latvia) 2025	Did not qualify				8	1	7
(Estonia) (Greece) (Slovenia) (Spain) 2029	To be determined				To be determined		
Total	2/38	16	0	16	93	12	81

=== Mediterranean Games ===
Mediterranean Games
Year	Position	Pld	W	L
(Greece) 1991	8th	5	0	5
(Italy) 2009	6th	6	1	5
Total		11	1	10

== Results and fixtures ==
Win Loss

=== 2024 ===
25 February 2024 2027 FIBA World Cup pre-qualifiers – 1st round	Armenia	84–79	Albania	Yerevan, Armenia
18:00 (UTC+4)	Scoring by quarter: 24–23, 24–19, 14–17, 22–20
	Pts: Spight 31; Rebs: Tavitian 8 Asts: Jones 11	Boxscore	Pts: Lekndreaj 19; Rebs: Lilaj 10; Asts: Lekndreaj 5	Arena: Karen Demirchyan Complex; Attendance: 3,000; Referees: Ciprian Stoica (ROU), Zoran Mitrovski (MKD), Emmouil Tsolakos (GRE)

21 November 2024 2027 FIBA World Cup pre-qualifiers – 1st round	Albania	63–99	Austria	Durrës, Albania
19:30 (UTC+1)	Scoring by quarter: 18–27, 17–23, 12–32, 16–17
	Pts: Hamati 16; Rebs: Hamati 6 Asts: Dusha 4	Boxscore	Pts: Landesberg 23; Rebs: Brajkovic 7 Asts: Vujošević 4	Arena: Dhimitraq Goga Sports Palace; Attendance: 250; Referees: Arnau Padros (ESP), Valerio Grigioni (ITA), Ioannis Agrafiotis (GRE)

=== 2025 ===
20 February 2025 2027 FIBA World Cup pre-qualifiers – 1st round	Albania	70–91	Armenia	Durrës, Albania
19:00 (UTC+1)	Scoring by quarter: 17–22, 16–25, 22–22, 15–22
	Pts: Lekndreaj 17; Rebs: Tola 8 Asts: Hysa 6	Boxscore	Pts: Jones 34; Rebs: Tatevosyan 7 Asts: Jones 10	Arena: Pallati i Sportit Dhimitraq Goga; Attendance: 250; Referees: Ioannis Tsimpouris (GRE), Hrvoje Čavar (BIH), Domen Krajnc (SVN)

23 February 2025 2027 FIBA World Cup pre-qualifiers – 1st round	Austria	67–78	Albania	Schwechat, Austria
16:00 (UTC+1)	Scoring by quarter: 16–19, 15–16, 17–22, 19–21
	Pts: Suljanovic 11; Rebs: Brajkovic 9 Asts: Hahn 6	Boxscore	Pts: Hysa 17; Rebs: Tola 9 Asts: Hysa, Topalli 5	Arena: Multiversum; Attendance: 1,500; Referees: Branimir Galić (CRO), Viktor Nagy (HUN), Elvis Binders-Čoders (LAT)

27 November 2025 EuroBasket 2029 pre-qualifiers – 1st round	Slovakia	73–63	Albania	Prievidza, Slovakia
18:00 (UTC+1)	Scoring by quarter: 19–23, 22–12, 16–17, 16–11
	Pts: Kováčik 13; Rebs: Golian 8 Asts: Ihring 5	Boxscore	Pts: Tola 16; Rebs: Hamati 10; Asts: Dusha, Hysa 3	Arena: Športová Hala Prievidza; Attendance: 1,764; Referees: Zoran Mitrovski (MKD), Viktor Nagy (HUN), Nermin Hodžić (GER)

30 November 2025 EuroBasket 2029 pre-qualifiers – 1st round	Albania	84–99	Kosovo	Shkodër, Albania
18:00 (UTC+1)	Scoring by quarter: 14–25, 14–19, 32–30, 24–25
	Pts: Hamati 19; Rebs: Hamati 10; Asts: Hysa 9	Boxscore	Pts: Berisha 35; Rebs: Kapiti 8 Asts: Armstead 7	Arena: Pallati i Sportit Qazim Dervishi; Attendance: 200; Referees: Mladen Lučić (MNE), Alessandro Perciavalle (ITA), Primož Pipan (SVN)

=== 2026 ===
2 March 2026 EuroBasket 2029 pre-qualifiers – 1st round	Albania	68–94	Slovakia	Shkodër, Albania
18:00 (UTC+1)	Scoring by quarter: 15–17, 20–30, 22–17, 11–30
	Pts: Taflaj, Tola 16; Rebs: Krypci 8 Asts: Tola 4	Boxscore	Pts: DeJulius 26; Rebs: Pavelka 10; Asts: S. Krajčovič 7	Arena: Pallati i Sportit Qazim Dervishi; Attendance: 300; Referees: Mehmet Karabilecen (TUR), Sava Ćetković (MNE), Goran Grbić (SVN)

2 July 2026 EuroBasket 2029 pre-qualifiers – 1st round	Kosovo	82–89	Albania	Prizren, Kosovo
19:00 (UTC+2)	Scoring by quarter: 23–23, 25–24, 17–22, 17–20
	Pts: Berisha 28; Rebs: Hajrizi 15; Asts: Myles 4	Boxscore	Pts: Tyree 25; Rebs: Gaxho 9 Asts: Tyree 8	Arena: Sezai Surroi Sports Hall; Attendance: 700; Referees: Ciprian Stoica (ROU), Landy Pierre (FRA), Diogo Martins (POR)

== Team ==
=== Current roster ===
Roster for the EuroBasket 2029 Pre-Qualifiers match on 2 July 2026 against Kosovo.

Albania men's national basketball team roster
Players
Coaches

Pos.	No.	Name	Age – Date of birth	Height	Club	Ctr.
G	0	Lion Alimani	23 – 26 November 2002	1.88 m (6 ft 2 in)	Besëlidhja	(Albania)
C	2	Xhuljan Tola	23 – 21 June 2003	2.11 m (6 ft 11 in)	Ionikos	(Greece)
G	3	Adriano Topalli	32 – 1 February 1994	1.90 m (6 ft 3 in)	Dafnis	(Greece)
SG	5	Breein Tyree	28 – 13 January 1998	1.88 m (6 ft 2 in)	PAOK	(Greece)
C	7	Martin Krypci	23 – 29 June 2003	2.10 m (6 ft 11 in)	Proteas Voulas	(Greece)
F	10	Xhoel Gaxho	28 – 12 October 1997	2.02 m (6 ft 8 in)	Ionikos	(Greece)
PG	12	Elvisi Dusha	31 – 15 July 1994	1.89 m (6 ft 2 in)	Bristol Hurricanes	(England)
G/F	13	Daniel Lekndreaj	28 – 16 November 1997	1.92 m (6 ft 4 in)	Prishtina	(Kosovo)
SG	22	Eldi Hysa	26 – 30 August 1999	1.95 m (6 ft 5 in)	Besëlidhja	(Albania)
C	23	Samuel Skendaj	25 – 2 May 2001	2.04 m (6 ft 8 in)	Tirana	(Albania)
C	33	Vinsent Grazhdani	23 – 14 July 2002	2.10 m (6 ft 11 in)	Besëlidhja	(Albania)
SF	55	Aleksis Nika	22 – 25 May 2004	2.04 m (6 ft 8 in)	Tirana	(Albania)

Head coach

- (Spain) Ricardo González Dávila

Assistant coach(es)

- (Albania) Simon Ivezaj
- (Albania) Endri Rumani

Legend

- (C) Team captain
- Club – describes last
  club before the competition
- Age – describes age
  on 2 July 2026

=== Depth chart ===
Pos.	Starting 5	Bench 1	Bench 2
C	Xhuljan Tola	Samuel Skendaj	Vinsent Grazhdani
PF	Martin Krypci	Aleksis Nika
SF	Daniel Lekndreaj	Xhoel Gaxho
SG	Breein Tyree	Eldi Hysa
PG	Elvisi Dusha	Adriano Topalli	Lion Alimani

== Head coach history ==
- (Albania) Rexhep Rama – (1946)
- (Albania) Naim Pilku – (1947–1959)
- (Albania) Feti Borova – (1960)
- (Albania) Naim Pilku – (1963)
- (Albania) Feti Borova – (1963–1965)
- (Albania) Astrit Greva – (1969)
- (Albania) Feti Borova – (1971–1974)
- (Albania) Bujar Shehu – (1975)
- (Albania) Feti Borova – (1976–1977)
- (Albania) Bujar Shehu – (1978)
- (Albania) Feti Borova – (1984–1985)
- (Albania) Astrit Greva – (1985–1991)
- (Albania) Bujar Shehu – (1992–1997)
- (Albania) Arben Fagu – (1998–2001)
- (Albania) Bujar Shehu – (2002)
- (Albania) Roland Avrami – (2002–2004)
- (Albania) Korab Llazani – (2005–2006)
- (Albania) Arben Fagu – (2006)
- (Albania) Roland Avrami – (2006–2009)
- (New Zealand) Mark Dickel – (2010–2011)
- (Albania) Fatmir Cuka – (2011–2012)
- (Albania) Roland Avrami – (2012–2013)
- (Cyprus) Antonis Constantinides – (2015–2017)
- (Greece) Antonios Doukas – (2017–2018)
- (Albania) Afrim Bilali – (2019–2023)
- (Greece) Antonios Doukas – (2023)
- (Albania) Erkand Karaj – (2023–2025)
- (Spain) Ricardo González Dávila – (2026–present)

== Past rosters ==
1947 EuroBasket: finished 14th among 14 teams

3 Muntaz Peshkopia, 4 Naim Pilku, 5 Bajram Kurani, 6 Çerçiz Zavalani, 7 Dilaver Toptani, 8 Ferdin Toptani, 9 Vlash Koljaka,
10 Dhimitraq Goga (Coach: (Albania) Naim Pilku)

1957 EuroBasket: finished 16th among 16 teams

3 Ilo Teneqexhi, 4 Feti Borova, 5 Dhimitraq Goga, 6 Kiço Gjata, 7 Ferdinand Qirici, 8 Muhamet Përmeti, 9 Fatmir Meka,
10 Muhamet Sokoli, 11 Salvador Sotiri, 12 Muhamet Moursakou, 13 Jorgji Çako (Coach: (Albania) Naim Pilku)

== See also ==
- Sport in Albania
- Albania women's national basketball team
- Albania men's national under-20 basketball team
- Albania men's national under-18 basketball team
- Albania men's national under-16 basketball team
