= Malta men's national basketball team =

Malta
- FIBA ranking: 101 ▼1 (1 September 2026)
- Joined FIBA: 1967
- FIBA zone: FIBA Europe
- National federation: Malta Basketball Association
- Coach: Alan Walls

EuroBasket
- Appearances: None

Championship for Small Countries
- Appearances: 16
- Medals: (gold) Gold: (2018, 2026); (silver) Silver: (2014, 2022); (bronze) Bronze: (2010, 2012), 2021)

Games of the Small States of Europe
- Appearances: 12
- Medals: (silver) Silver: (1997, 2023); (bronze) Bronze: (1985, 1987)
Home	Away

First international
- Malta 81–88 Cyprus (Serravalle, San Marino; 23 May 1985)

Biggest win
- Malta 102–57 Gibraltar (Serravalle, San Marino; 30 June 2018)

Biggest defeat
- Malta 43–138 Hungary (Ta' Qali, Malta; 13 June 2001)

The Malta men's national basketball team (Maltese: Tim nazzjonali tal-basketball ta' Malta) represents Malta in international basketball. They are controlled by the Malta Basketball Association. Malta has been a FIBA member since 1967, and competes at tournaments such as the European Championship for Small Countries and the Games of the Small States of Europe.

== History ==
Malta made their official debut at the 1985 Games of the Small States of Europe, where they achieved the bronze medal. The team was equally successful at the next edition. Then they did not win another medal again until the 1997 tournament. They surprisingly won the silver medal after defeating Luxembourg in the semifinals, and losing to Cyprus in the final.

In 2001 and 2003, Malta joined the qualifying stages of the EuroBasket for the 2003 and 2005 editions respectively. However, they failed to qualify for both tournaments, as the team finished with six losses in six games played each time.

Malta also participated in all the editions of the European Championship for Small Countries, but did not win any medal until 2010, when they beat Moldova for bronze. In 2012, they won the bronze again and in 2014, Malta lost to Andorra in the final 66–63 to take home silver.

On 1 July 2018, Malta won their first official title after beating Norway, by the score of 75–59 in the final of the 2018 European Championship for Small Countries. Samuel Deguara claimed the MVP title. After this success, Malta decided to take part in the Games of the Small States of Europe in 2019.

== Competitive record ==
=== At Eurobasket ===
EuroBasket					Qualification		
Year	Pos.	Pld	W	L	Pld	W	L
(Sweden) 2003	Did not qualify				6	0	6
(Serbia and Montenegro) 2005	Division B				6	0	6

=== At the Championship for Small Countries ===
Championship for Small Countries
Year	Pos.	Pld	W	L
(Malta) 1988	6th	5	2	3
(Wales) 1990	7th	5	2	3
(Cyprus) 1992	6th	5	1	4
(Republic of Ireland) 1994	6th	5	1	4
(San Marino) 1996	7th	5	1	4
(Gibraltar) 1998	5th	4	0	4
(Andorra) 2000	5th	5	2	3
(Malta) 2002	7th	5	1	4
(Andorra) 2004	9th	4	0	4
(Albania) 2006	8th	5	1	4
(Scotland) 2008	7th	5	1	4
(Malta) 2010	3rd place, bronze medalist(s)	5	3	2
(San Marino) 2012	3rd place, bronze medalist(s)	5	3	2
(Gibraltar) 2014	2nd place, silver medalist(s)	4	3	1
(Moldova) 2016	6th	5	2	3
(San Marino) 2018	1st place, gold medalist(s)	4	2	2
(Republic of Ireland) 2021	3rd place, bronze medalist(s)	4	2	2
(Malta) 2022	2nd place, silver medalist(s)	4	3	1
(Andorra) 2024	2nd place, silver medalist(s)	5	2	3
(Gibraltar) 2026	1st place, gold medalist(s)	1	5	5
Total		94	37	57

=== At the Games of the Small States ===
Games of the Small States of Europe
Year	Pos.	Pld	W	L
(San Marino) 1985	3rd place, bronze medalist(s)	3	1	2
(Monaco) 1987	3rd place, bronze medalist(s)	3	2	1
(Cyprus) 1989	5th	3	1	2
(Andorra) 1991	5th	4	3	1
(Malta) 1993	6th	5	1	4
(Luxembourg) 1995	5th	3	1	2
(Iceland) 1997	2nd place, silver medalist(s)	4	3	1
(San Marino) 2001	6th	4	2	2
(Malta) 2003	7th	3	0	3
(Andorra) 2005	Did not enter			
(Monaco) 2007	Did not enter			
(Cyprus) 2009	5th	5	1	4
(Luxembourg) 2013	Did not enter			
(Iceland) 2015	Did not enter			
(San Marino) 2017	Did not enter			
(Montenegro) 2019	4th	4	1	3
(Malta) 2023	2nd place, silver medalist(s)	5	2	3
Total		46	18	28

== Team ==
=== Current roster ===
Roster for the 2026 FIBA European Championship for Small Countries:

Malta national basketball team roster
Players
Coaches

Pos.	No.	Name	Age – Date of birth	Height	Club	Ctr.
PG	0	Alec Felice Pace	28 – 15 May 1998	1.80 m (5 ft 11 in)	Starlites BC	(Malta)
PG	1	Ian Felice Pace	25 – 27 January 2001	1.79 m (5 ft 10 in)	Starlites BC	(Malta)
SG	2	Kai Fabri	18 – 12 June 2008	1.80 m (5 ft 11 in)	Starlites BC	(Malta)
SF	3	Jordan Tucker	28 – 3 April 1998	2.00 m (6 ft 7 in)	Élan Chalon	(France)
PF	9	Nathan Xuereb	24 – 21 December 2001	1.81 m (5 ft 11 in)	LUXOL BC	(Malta)
SG	10	Kurt-Joseph Xuereb	28 – 16 July 1997	1.82 m (6 ft 0 in)	Starlites BC	(Malta)
PF	11	Matthew Gouder	28 – 24 January 1998	1.92 m (6 ft 4 in)	Athleta BC	(Malta)
F	12	Aaron Falzon	30 – 19 May 1996	2.03 m (6 ft 8 in)	Traiskirchen Lions	(Austria)
C	13	Kurt Cassar	27 – 13 April 1999	1.98 m (6 ft 6 in)	Nuovo Basket Aquilano	(Italy)
C	14	Michael Sjoberg	26 – 31 October 1999	2.03 m (6 ft 8 in)	BBC Monthey-Chablais	(Switzerland)
PG	15	Neil Cassar	22 – 5 February 2004	1.98 m (6 ft 6 in)	Hibernians BC	(Malta)
C	16	Samuel Deguara	35 – 21 June 1991	2.30 m (7 ft 7 in)	Yankey Ark	(Taiwan)

Head coach

- (Malta) Paul Ferrante

Assistant coach(es)

- (Malta) Omar James George Said

Legend

- (C) Team captain
- Club – describes last
  club before the competition
- Age – describes age
  on 28 June 2026

== Head coach position ==
- (Italy) Bruno diPietrantonio: 2010
- (Italy) Paolo Di Fonzo: 2012-2014
- (Italy) Andrea Paccarie: 2016

== Kit ==
=== Manufacturer ===
2018: Macron

=== Sponsor ===
2018: TEAMSPORT

== See also ==
- Sport in Malta
- Malta women's national basketball team
- Malta men's national under-18 basketball team
- Malta men's national under-16 basketball team
- Malta men's national 3x3 team
