= 1994 European Promotion Cup for Men =

Tournament details
- Host country: Ireland
- City: Dublin
- Dates: 4–8 June 1994
- Teams: 8 (from 1 confederation)
- Venue(s): 1 (in 1 host city)

Final positions
- Champions: Ireland (1st title)
- Runners-up: Cyprus
- Third place: Iceland

Official website
- www.fibaeurope.com

The 1994 European Promotion Cup for Men was the 4th edition of this international basketball tournament. It was hosted in Dublin, Ireland and the host team achieved their first title ever after beating Cyprus in the final game.

== Preliminary round ==
=== Group A ===
Pos	Team	Pld	W	L	PF	PA	PD	Pts	Qualification	(Cyprus)	(Iceland)	(Gibraltar)	(Andorra)
1	Cyprus	3	3	0	222	170	+52	6	Semifinals	—			55–50
2	Iceland	3	2	1	264	222	+42	5	Semifinals	75–83	—	90–49	
3	Gibraltar	3	1	2	182	243	−61	4	Classification games	45–84		—	
4	Andorra	3	0	3	209	242	−33	3	Classification games		90–99	69–88	—

Source: Archive FIBA

=== Group B ===
Pos	Team	Pld	W	L	PF	PA	PD	Pts	Qualification	(Republic of Ireland)	(Luxembourg)	(Wales)	(Malta)
1	Ireland	3	3	0	271	178	+93	6	Semifinals	—	87–69		95–54
2	Luxembourg	3	2	1	234	219	+15	5	Semifinals		—	76–58	
3	Wales	3	1	2	170	221	−51	4	Classification games	55–89		—	57–56
4	Malta	3	0	3	184	241	−57	3	Classification games		74–89		—

Source: Archive FIBA

== Classification games ==
5th–8th place semifinals
Andorra	52
Wales	58
Malta	74
Gibraltar	60

5th place match
Wales	82
Malta	55
7th place match
Andorra	64
Gibraltar	69

== Final round ==
=== Bracket ===
Semifinals
Iceland	76
Ireland	89
Luxembourg	76
Cyprus	85

Final
Ireland	81
Cyprus	78
3rd place match
Iceland	95
Luxembourg	87

=== Final ===
8 June 2014
20:45

Boxscore

Ireland	81–78	Cyprus
Scoring by half: 46–38, 35–40

National Basketball Arena, Dublin
Referees: Peter Klingbiel (GER), Christophe Vautier (FRA)

== Final standings ==
Rank	Team	Record
1st place, gold medalist(s)	Ireland	5–0
2nd place, silver medalist(s)	Cyprus	4–1
3rd place, bronze medalist(s)	Iceland	3–2
4	Luxembourg	2–3
5	Wales	3–2
6	Malta	1–4
7	Gibraltar	2–3
8	Andorra	0–5
