= 2004 European Promotion Cup for Men =

Tournament details
- Host country: Andorra
- City: Andorra la Vella
- Dates: 7–12 July 2004
- Teams: 9 (from 1 confederation)
- Venue: 1 (in 1 host city)

Final positions
- Champions: Andorra (3rd title)
- Runners-up: Luxembourg
- Third place: Scotland

Official website
- www.fibaeurope.com

The 2004 European Promotion Cup for Men was the 9th edition of this tournament. It was hosted in Andorra, whose national team won its third tournament by defeating Luxembourg in the final.

== Preliminary round ==
=== Group A ===
Pos	Team	Pld	W	L	PF	PA	PD	Pts	Qualification	(Andorra)	(Azerbaijan)	(San Marino)	(Gibraltar)
1	Andorra (H)	3	3	0	290	248	+42	6	Final	—	99–84		
2	Azerbaijan	3	2	1	252	222	+30	5	Classification games		—	81–59	
3	San Marino	3	1	2	215	221	−6	4	Classification games	82–86		—	74–54
4	Gibraltar	3	0	3	200	266	−66	3	Classification games	82–105	64–87		—

Source: Archive FIBA
(H) Hosts

=== Group B ===
Pos	Team	Pld	W	L	PF	PA	PD	Pts	Qualification	(Luxembourg)	(Scotland)	(Albania)	(Wales)	(Malta)
1	Luxembourg	4	4	0	339	262	+77	8	Final	—			90–59	92–61
2	Scotland	4	3	1	330	285	+45	7	Classification games	71–80	—		92–71	
3	Albania	4	2	2	319	300	+19	6	Classification games	71–77	72–81	—		
4	Wales	4	1	3	289	341	−52	5	Classification games			66–90	—	93–69
5	Malta	4	0	4	268	357	−89	4			62–86	76–86		—

Source: Archive FIBA

== Classification games ==
Team 1	Score	Team 2
Gibraltar	70–69	Wales
San Marino	70–84	Albania
Azerbaijan	78–101	Scotland

== Final ==
12 June 2004
18:00

Boxscore

Andorra	95–83	Luxembourg
Scoring by quarter: 19–23, 34–12, 16–25, 26–23
Pts: Bermudo 24; Rebs: Bermudo 14; Asts: Galera 4		Pts: M. Rajniak 27; Rebs: M. Rajniak 12; Asts: Schartz 2

Poliesportiu d'Andorra, Andorra la Vella
Attendance: 450

== Final ranking ==
Rank	Team	Record
1st place, gold medalist(s)	Andorra	4–0
2nd place, silver medalist(s)	Luxembourg	4–1
3rd place, bronze medalist(s)	Scotland	4–1
4	Azerbaijan	2–2
5	Albania	3–2
6	San Marino	1–3
7	Gibraltar	1–3
8	Wales	1–4
9	Malta	0–4
