= FIBA EuroBasket 2008 Division C =

Tournament details
- Host country: Scotland
- City: Edinburgh
- Dates: 17–22 June 2008
- Teams: 8 (from 1 confederation)
- Venue(s): 1 (in 1 host city)

Final positions
- Champions: Azerbaijan (2nd title)
- Runners-up: Moldova
- Third place: Scotland

Official website
- www.fibaeurope.com

The 2008 EuroBasket Division C was the third-ranked tier (lowest) of the bi-annual EuroBasket competition. The winner of this tournament was Azerbaijan.

== Group phase ==
=== Group A ===
Team	Pts	W	L	PF	PA	Diff
Moldova	6	3	0	252	179	+73
Azerbaijan	5	2	1	232	200	+32
San Marino	4	1	2	224	240	-16
Gibraltar	3	0	3	195	284	-89

=== Group B ===
Team	Pts	W	L	PF	PA	Diff
Scotland	6	3	0	213	175	+38
Andorra	5	2	1	214	188	+26
Wales	4	1	2	153	199	-46
Malta	3	0	3	151	169	-18

== Final round ==
Semifinals
Moldova	85
Andorra	74
Scotland	80
Azerbaijan	91

Final
Moldova	78
Azerbaijan	80
Bronze medal game
Andorra	76
Scotland	90

== 5th to 8th place ==
- San Marino 73 – 57 Malta
- Wales 77 – 93 Gibraltar

=== 5th to 6th place ===
- San Marino 77 – 64 Gibraltar

=== 7th to 8th place ===
- Malta 84 – 67 Wales

== Final standings ==
1. Azerbaijan
2. Moldova
3. Scotland
4. Andorra
5. San Marino
6. Gibraltar
7. Malta
8. Wales
