= 2024 FIBA European Championship for Small Countries =

Tournament details
- Host country: Andorra
- City: Andorra la Vella
- Dates: 25–30 June 2024
- Teams: 4 (from 1 confederation)
- Venue(s): 1 (in 1 host city)

Final positions
- Champions: Andorra (6th title)
- Runners-up: Malta
- Third place: San Marino

Official website
- www.fiba.basketball

The 2024 FIBA European Championship for Small Countries was the 19th edition of this competition. The tournament was played in Andorra la Vella, Andorra, from 25 to 30 June 2024. In this tournament, Andorra took the first place.

== Participating teams ==
Team	WR (Note: As of February 2024)
Andorra	94
Gibraltar	142
Malta	97
San Marino	119

== First round ==
The draw of the first round was held on 6 February 2024 in Freising, Germany.

In the first round, the teams played a round-robin tournament. All teams advanced to the playoffs.

Pos	Team	Pld	W	L	PF	PA	PD	Pts
1	Andorra (H)	3	2	1	225	208	+17	5
2	Gibraltar	3	2	1	221	224	−3	5
3	Malta	3	1	2	251	223	+28	4
4	San Marino	3	1	2	183	225	−42	4

Source: FIBA
(H) Hosts

All times are local (Central European Summer Time – UTC+2).

25 June 2024
17:00

Boxscore

Gibraltar	89–81	Malta
Scoring by quarter: 26–11, 16–32, 19–17, 28–21
Pts: Ortega 27; Rebs: Pérez 7 Asts: Ortega 5		Pts: Sjoberg 19; Rebs: Tomasi 9 Asts: Cassar 8

Poliesportiu d'Andorra
Attendance: 23
Referees: Ilias Kounellis (CYP), Igor Esteve Malmierca (AND), Zdenko Tomasovic (SVK)

25 June 2024
19:30

Boxscore

San Marino	68–63	Andorra
Scoring by quarter: 15–18, 13–17, 18–15, 22–13
Pts: Macina 25; Rebs: Botteghi 12; Asts: Macina, Riccardi 2		Pts: Bartolomé 13; Rebs: Gabriel 11; Asts: Fernández 8

Poliesportiu d'Andorra
Attendance: 329
Referees: Dariusz Zapolski (POL), James Kerry Dominique (GIB), Maciej Nazimek (IRL)

26 June 2024
17:00

Boxscore

Malta	92–52	San Marino
Scoring by quarter: 23–8, 23–9, 19–22, 27–13
Pts: Deguara 26; Rebs: Deguara 14; Asts: Cassar 6		Pts: Macina 11; Rebs: Botteghi 6 Asts: Fiorani 5

Poliesportiu d'Andorra
Attendance: 34

26 June 2024
19:30

Boxscore

Andorra	80–62	Gibraltar
Scoring by quarter: 22–17, 21–14, 22–14, 15–17
Pts: Gabriel, Serrato 16; Rebs: Gabriel, López 7 Asts: Fernández 7		Pts: McGrail 21; Rebs: El Yettetfi 10; Asts: three players 2

Poliesportiu d'Andorra
Attendance: 239

27 June 2024
17:00

Boxscore

Gibraltar	70–63 (OT)	San Marino
Scoring by quarter: 15–11, 13–17, 19–16, 11–14, Overtime: 12–5
Pts: McGrail 20; Rebs: El Yettetfi 14; Asts: McGrail, Ortega 4		Pts: Macina 13; Rebs: Botteghi 12; Asts: Macina 3

Poliesportiu d'Andorra
Attendance: 11

27 June 2024
19:30

Boxscore

Andorra	82–78	Malta
Scoring by quarter: 16–23, 18–17, 25–16, 23–22
Pts: Serrato 17; Rebs: Gabriel 7 Asts: Serrato 5		Pts: Deguara 19; Rebs: Deguara 10; Asts: Bugeja 8

Poliesportiu d'Andorra
Attendance: 291

== Playoffs ==
=== Bracket ===
Semifinals
29 June
Andorra	64
San Marino	59
29 June
Gibraltar	79
Malta	85

Final
30 June
Andorra	84
Malta	79
3rd place game
30 June
San Marino	73
Gibraltar	70

=== Semifinals ===
29 June 2024
17:00

Boxscore

Gibraltar	79–85	Malta
Scoring by quarter: 20–21, 16–25, 19–22, 24–17
Pts: Ortega 21; Rebs: Pérez 5 Asts: Ortega 6		Pts: Cassar 15; Rebs: Cassar 11; Asts: Xuereb 4

Poliesportiu d'Andorra
Attendance: 47
Referees: Ilias Kounellis (CYP), Igor Esteve Malmierca (AND), Zdenko Tomasovic (SVK)

29 June 2024
19:30

Boxscore

Andorra	64–59	San Marino
Scoring by quarter: 12–15, 20–6, 13–21, 19–17
Pts: Serrato 14; Rebs: Gabriel, Oriol 6 Asts: Serrato 7		Pts: Felici 19; Rebs: Felici 11; Asts: Macina 5

Poliesportiu d'Andorra
Attendance: 386
Referees: Dariusz Zapolski (POL), Maciej Nazimek (IRL), James Kerry Dominique (GIB)

=== 3rd place game ===
30 June 2024
17:00

Boxscore

San Marino	73–70	Gibraltar
Scoring by quarter: 17–17, 15–21, 21–11, 20–21
Pts: Moretti 18; Rebs: Botteghi 18; Asts: Macina 10		Pts: Ortega 27; Rebs: Yome 10; Asts: three players 3

Poliesportiu d'Andorra
Attendance: 37
Referees: Dariusz Zapolski (POL), Igor Esteve Malmierca (AND), Maciej Nazimek (IRL)

=== Final ===
30 June 2024
19:30

Boxscore

Andorra	84–79	Malta
Pts: Bartolomé 24; Rebs: López 9 Asts: Oriol 9		Pts: Bugeja 22; Rebs: Tomasi, Sjoberg 10; Asts: Bugeja 6

Poliesportiu d'Andorra
Attendance: 535
Referees: Ilias Kounellis (CYP), Zdenko Tomasovic (SVK), James Kerry Dominique (GIB)
