= Andrew Joseph Steven =

Scottish basketball player (born 1985)

Andrew Joseph Steven (born 21 May 1985) is a Scottish professional basketball player with the Scotland national basketball team. Currently playing in Spain for Quintanar del Rey in the National 1 Division. He has also had short spells with the Scottish Rocks on two occasions. He played for St. Mirren basketball club for 9 years before moving to Spain on 30 August 2007. He scored 28 points in a record-breaking victory for Scotland Universities against England in his second year with the team (2005–2007). He currently holds a BUSA record for most points in a game at 86 in an overtime win against Napier University. He plays the shooting guard position and wears the number 6 jersey.
