= FIBA European Championship for Small Countries =

Lowest-ranked tier of the biennial FIBA EuroBasket competition

- Current season, competition or edition: 2026 FIBA European Championship for Small Countries
- Formerly: Promotion Cup; EuroBasket Division C
- Sport: Basketball
- Founded: 1988; 38 years ago
- First season: 1988
- Countries: Lowest-ranked FIBA Europe teams
- Continent: Europe
- Most recent champion: Andorra (6th title)
- Most titles: Andorra (6 titles)
- Related competitions: EuroBasket
- Website: www.fiba.basketball/history

The FIBA European Championship for Small Countries is the lowest-ranked tier of the biennial FIBA EuroBasket competition, organized by FIBA Europe.

== History ==
This championship was first introduced in 1988, as the Promotion Cup, the competition organized for the lowest ranked European national basketball teams. Since then, the competition has been held biannually. In 2007, the Promotion Cup was officially renamed EuroBasket Division C. In 2011, after the divisional system for the FIBA EuroBasket was abolished, the FIBA EuroBasket Division C was renamed to FIBA European Championship for Small Countries.

== Results ==
Year	Host	Final match			Third place match			Teams
Year	Host	First place	Score	Second place	Third place	Score	Fourth place	Teams
1988 details	Malta	Iceland	86–69	Ireland	Cyprus	73–68	Luxembourg	8
1990 details	Wales (Cardiff)	Iceland	101–93	Cyprus	Luxembourg	75–70	Ireland	8
1992 details	Cyprus (Nicosia)	Austria	70–68	Luxembourg	Cyprus	86–85	Ireland	8
1994 details	Ireland (Dublin)	Ireland	81–78	Cyprus	Iceland	95–87	Luxembourg	8
1996 details	San Marino	Austria	54–52	Norway	San Marino	85–70	Wales	8
1998 details	Gibraltar	Andorra	Group tournament	Wales	San Marino	Group tournament	Gibraltar	5
2000 details	Andorra	Andorra	Group tournament	San Marino	Scotland	Group tournament	Wales	6
2002 details	Malta (Ta' Qali)	San Marino	82–70	Wales	Scotland	94–80	Andorra	8
2004 details	Andorra	Andorra	95–83	Luxembourg	Scotland	101–78	Azerbaijan	9
2006 details	Albania (Durrës)	Azerbaijan	66–57	Albania	Andorra	94–85	Moldova	8
2008 details	Scotland (Edinburgh)	Azerbaijan	80–78	Moldova	Scotland	90–76	Andorra	8
2010 details	Malta (Valletta)	Denmark	87–69	Andorra	Malta	85–77	Moldova	8
2012 details	San Marino	Andorra	74–72	Moldova	Malta	96–57	San Marino	7
2014 details	Gibraltar	Andorra	66–63	Malta	Scotland	67–55	San Marino	6
2016 details	Moldova (Ciorescu)	Armenia	79–71	Andorra	San Marino	60–53	Ireland	8
2018 details	San Marino	Malta	75–59	Norway	Ireland	86–66	Gibraltar	7
2021 details	Ireland (Dublin)	Ireland	Round robin	Andorra	Malta	Round robin	San Marino	5
2022 details	Malta (Ta' Qali)	Armenia	84–68	Malta	Andorra	84–75	Azerbaijan	6
2024 details	Andorra	Andorra	84–79	Malta	San Marino	73–70	Gibraltar	4
2026 details	Gibraltar	Malta	90–76	Andorra	Gibraltar	72–67	San Marino	4

== Performance ==
Rank	Nation	Gold	Silver	Bronze	Total
1	Andorra	6	4	2	12
2	Malta	2	3	3	8
3	Ireland	2	1	1	4
4	Iceland	2	0	1	3
5	Armenia	2	0	0	2
5	Austria	2	0	0	2
5	Azerbaijan	2	0	0	2
8	San Marino	1	1	4	6
9	Denmark	1	0	0	1
10	Cyprus	0	2	2	4
11	Luxembourg	0	2	1	3
12	Moldova	0	2	0	2
12	Norway	0	2	0	2
12	Wales	0	2	0	2
15	Albania	0	1	0	1
16	Scotland	0	0	5	5
17	Gibraltar	0	0	1	1
Totals (17 entries)		20	20	20	60

== Participation details ==
Team	(Malta) 1988	(Wales) 1990	(Cyprus) 1992	(Republic of Ireland) 1994	(San Marino) 1996	(Gibraltar) 1998	(Andorra) 2000	(Malta) 2002	(Andorra) 2004	(Albania) 2006	(Scotland) 2008	(Malta) 2010	(San Marino) 2012	(Gibraltar) 2014	(Moldova) 2016	(San Marino) 2018	(Republic of Ireland) 2021	(Malta) 2022	(Andorra) 2024	(Gibraltar) 2026	Total
Albania								6th	5th	2nd											3
Andorra				8th	6th	1st	1st	4th	1st	3rd	4th	2nd	1st	1st	2nd	5th	2nd	3rd	1st	2nd	17
Armenia															1st			1st			2
Austria			1st		1st																2
Azerbaijan									4th	1st	1st							4th			4
Cyprus	3rd	2nd	3rd	2nd																	4
Denmark												1st									1
Gibraltar	7th	5th	7th	7th	8th	4th	6th	8th	7th	7th	6th	7th	7th	6th	8th	4th	5th	6th	4th	3rd	20
Iceland	1st	1st		3rd																	3
Ireland	2nd	4th	4th	1st											4th	3rd	1st				7
Luxembourg	4th	3rd	2nd	4th					2nd												5
Malta	6th	7th	6th	6th	7th	5th	5th	7th	9th	8th	7th	3rd	3rd	2nd	6th	1st	3rd	2nd	2nd	1st	20
Moldova								5th		4th	2nd	4th	2nd		5th	7th					7
Norway					2nd											2nd					2
San Marino	5th	6th	5th		3rd	3rd	2nd	1st	6th	5th	5th	8th	4th	4th	3rd	6th	4th	5th	3rd	4th	19
Scotland					5th		3rd	3rd	3rd		3rd	6th	6th	3rd							8
Wales	8th	8th	8th	5th	4th	2nd	4th	2nd	8th	6th	8th	5th	5th	5th	7th						15

== See also ==
- FIBA Women's European Championship for Small Countries
