= Feti Borova =

Albanian former basketball player and coach

Personal information
- Born: 10 January 1931 Tirana, Albania
- Died: 6 May 2005 (aged 74)
- Coaching career: 1960–1988

Career history

Coaching
- 1960: Albania
- 1963–1965: Albania
- 1971–1974: Albania
- 1976–1977: Albania
- 1984–1985: Albania
- 1973–1988: Tirana

Feti Borova (10 January 1931 – 6 May 2005) was an Albanian basketball coach and basketball player. From 1992 until 1995, he was the president of the Albanian Basketball Federation. The Tirana Olympic Park was named after him.
