= 1992 European Promotion Cup for Men =

International basketball tournament

Tournament details
- Host country: Cyprus
- City: Nicosia
- Dates: 2–6 June 1992
- Teams: 8 (from 1 confederation)
- Venue(s): 1 (in 1 host city)

Final positions
- Champions: Austria (1st title)
- Runners-up: Luxembourg
- Third place: Cyprus

Official website
- www.fibaeurope.com

The 1992 European Promotion Cup for Men was the third edition of this tournament. It was hosted in Nicosia, Cyprus and Austria men's national basketball team achieved their first title ever after beating Luxembourg in the final game.

== Preliminary round ==
=== Group A ===
Pos	Team	Pld	W	L	PF	PA	PD	Pts	Qualification	(Austria)	(Luxembourg)	(Wales)	(Gibraltar)
1	Austria	3	3	0	254	209	+45	6	Semifinals	—	85–81	71–66	98–62
2	Luxembourg (H)	3	2	1	285	211	+74	5	Semifinals		—		96–73
3	Wales	3	1	2	204	251	−47	4	Classification games		53–108	—	
4	Gibraltar	3	0	3	207	279	−72	3	Classification games			72–85	—

Source: FIBA Archive
(H) Hosts

=== Group B ===
Pos	Team	Pld	W	L	PF	PA	PD	Pts	Qualification	(Cyprus)	(Republic of Ireland)	(San Marino)	(Malta)
1	Cyprus (H)	3	3	0	263	204	+59	6	Semifinals	—	90–89	73–64	100–51
2	Ireland	3	2	1	244	178	+66	5	Semifinals		—	64–43	
3	San Marino	3	1	2	191	197	−6	4	Classification games			—	84–60
4	Malta	3	0	3	156	275	−119	3	Classification games		45–91		—

Source: FIBA Archive
(H) Hosts

== Classification games ==
5th–8th place semifinals
Gibraltar	59
San Marino	76
Malta	70
Wales	61

5th place match
San Marino	87
Malta	71
7th place match
Gibraltar	73
Wales	69

== Final round ==
=== Bracket ===
Semifinals
Luxembourg	82
Cyprus	69
Ireland	73
Austria	76

Final
Luxembourg	68
Austria	70
3rd place match
Cyprus	86
Ireland	85

=== Final ===
6 June 1992
19:00

Boxscore

Luxembourg	68–70	Austria
Scoring by half: 30–27, 38–43

Lefkotheo, Nicosia
Referees: Kamen Toshev (BUL), Albert Flores (GIB)

== Final standings ==
Rank	Team	Record
1st place, gold medalist(s)	Austria	5–0
2nd place, silver medalist(s)	Luxembourg	3–2
3rd place, bronze medalist(s)	Cyprus	4–1
4	Ireland	2–3
5	San Marino	3–2
6	Malta	1–4
7	Gibraltar	1–4
8	Wales	1–4
