= Basketball at the 1985 Games of the Small States of Europe =

- Venue: various

Basketball at the 1985 Games of the Small States of Europe was held in 1985 in San Marino.

== Medal summary ==
Event	Gold	Silver	Bronze
Men	Cyprus	Luxembourg	Malta

== Men's tournament ==
Men's tournament was played by a round-robin group composed by four teams.

=== Table ===
Pos	Team	Pld	W	L	PF	PA	PD	Pts	Qualification	(Cyprus)	(Luxembourg)	(Malta)	(Andorra)
1	Cyprus (C)	3	3	0	256	241	+15	6	Gold medal	—	73–71		92–87
2	Luxembourg	3	1	2	159	154	+5	4	Silver medal		—	88–81	
3	Malta	3	1	2	235	245	−10	4	Bronze medal	83–91		—	71–66
4	Andorra	3	1	2	153	163	−10	4			AND		—

Source: Times of Malta
(C) Champions
