= Basketball Scotland =

Governing body of basketball in Scotland

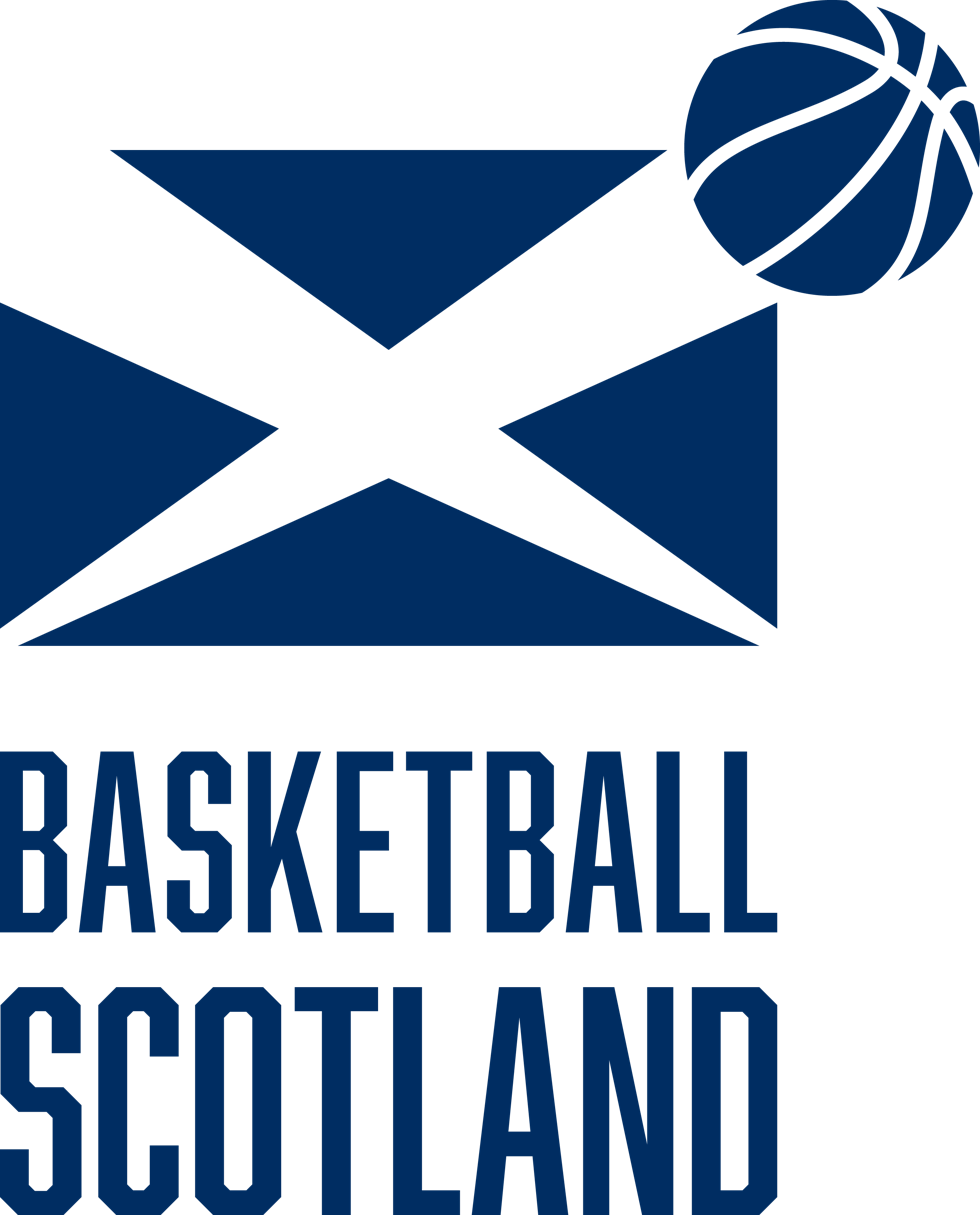
- Sport: Basketball
- Jurisdiction: National
- Founded: 1947
- Headquarters: Edinburgh
- Chairperson: Derek Weir
- CEO: David Fallon

Official website
- www.basketball.scot
- (Scotland)

Basketball Scotland is the governing body of the sport of basketball in Scotland. The organisation manages national competitions and runs the Scotland national basketball team.

== History ==
It was formed as the Amateur Basketball Association of Scotland in 1947, later being known as the Scottish Basketball Association.

A lack of access to gym facilities was cited as a reason that basketball had not grown as expected in Scotland in the 1960s. In 1969 the association established a national league for ten clubs.

In 1977 they had around 2000 players registered with them. and a similar number in 1997.

In 2023 the organisation ran their first Junior NBA festival in Dundee.

They are also founder members of the reformed Great Britain national basketball team. In 2024, Basketball Scotland joined with Basketball England and Basketball Wales to partner in running youth and Senior teams for Great Britain.

In 2024 the organisation moved out of the Caledonia House office in South Gyle, Edinburgh.

In summer 2025, David Fallon was appointed chief executive of Basketball Scotland after Kevin Pringle stepped down after 19 years of service.

In 2026, the organisation undertook some rebranding.

== National leagues ==
- Scottish Basketball Championship Men
- Scottish Basketball Championship Women

== National teams ==
- Scotland men's national basketball team
- Scotland women's national basketball team

== See also ==
- Commonwealth Games Council for Scotland
- Sport in Scotland
