= Austria men's national basketball team =

Austria
- FIBA ranking: 66 (1 September 2026)
- Joined FIBA: 1934
- FIBA zone: FIBA Europe
- National federation: Basketball Austria
- Coach: Aramis Naglić
- Nickname(s): Das Team (The Team); Unsere Burschen (Our Boys)

FIBA World Cup
- Appearances: None

EuroBasket
- Appearances: 6
- Medals: None

Championship for Small Countries
- Appearances: 2
- Medals: (gold) Gold: (1992, 1996)
Home	Away

First international
- Bulgaria 56–13 Austria (Prague, Czechoslovakia; 27 April 1947)

Biggest win
- Algeria 63–119 Austria (Böblingen, West Germany; 13 May 1975)

Biggest defeat
- France 100–6 Austria (Prague, Czechoslovakia; 28 April 1947)

The Austria men's national basketball team (German: Österreichische Basketballnationalmannschaft) represents Austria in international basketball competition. The team is controlled and organised by Basketball Austria.

Austria has competed at the EuroBasket six times throughout their history. Their best performance overall came at the 1951 tournament. However, the team is still seeking qualification to their first appearance on to the global stage at the FIBA World Cup.

== History ==
=== EuroBasket 1947 ===
Austria first competed in the European Basketball Championship at EuroBasket 1947, placing 12th of 14 teams. Initially, the team struggled and lost both of their preliminary round matches, along with their first semifinal round match. Then they defeated Albania to place second in the group and set up a match against the Netherlands for 11th and 12th place, which Austria lost after a long battle.

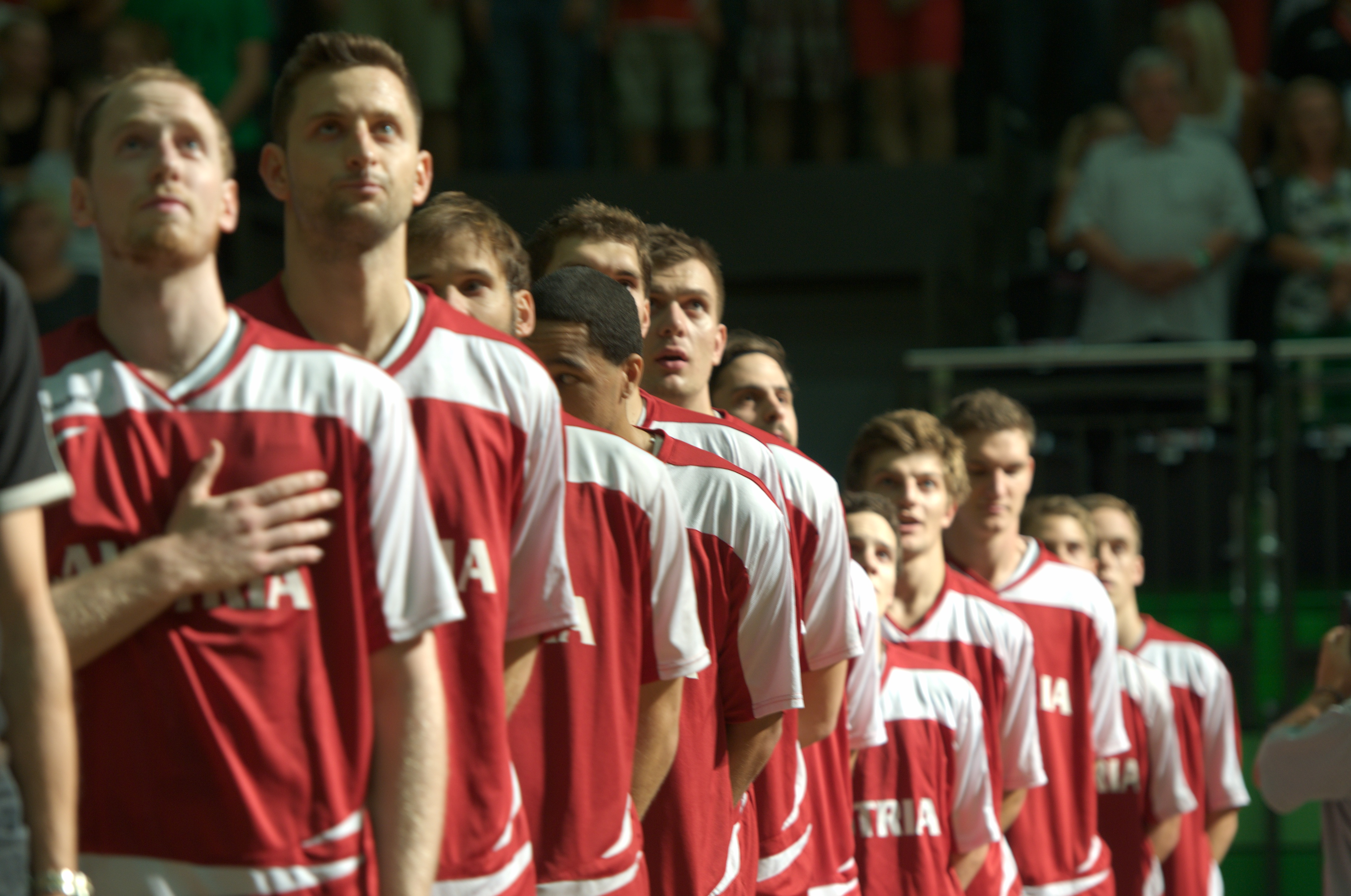
Austria national team before game

=== EuroBasket 1951 ===
Austria made their second appearance on the continental stage at EuroBasket 1951 in Paris. The national team was eliminated from championship contention after finishing 1–3 in pool play and fourth in their group. They won all three of their first round classification games, however, advancing to the 9th–12th place classification semifinals. A loss to the Netherlands, but a win over West Germany propelled Austria into 11th place of the 18 teams in the tournament.

=== EuroBasket 1955 ===
Austria's appearance at EuroBasket 1955 in Budapest began with a 2–2 showing in preliminary round play. This was good enough for third place in the pool, and Austria was pushed to classification play. There, they were able to win only 1 out of 4 games (the win coming against West Germany), placing fourth of the five teams in the group. Playing against Luxembourg and then Switzerland in classification for the 13th–16th place playoffs, Austria won both games to finish 13th of the 18 teams.

=== EuroBasket 1957 ===
In Sofia for the EuroBasket 1957 competition, Austria was defeated three times in the preliminary round. Their 0–3 record put them last in their group and sent them to the classification pool. The team won two games there, finishing at a record of 2–5 to take an overall 14th place in the 16 team tournament.

=== Later years ===
Austria went on to qualify to the EuroBasket two more times in 1959 and 1977. But since then it has been a struggle for the national team to qualify for major international basketball tournaments.

== Competitive record ==
=== FIBA World Cup ===
World Cup					Qualification		
Year	Position	Pld	W	L	Pld	W	L
(Argentina) 1950	Did not qualify				5	0	5
(Brazil) 1954	Did not enter				Did not enter		
(Chile) 1959	Did not qualify				Did not qualify		
(Brazil) 1963	Did not enter				Did not enter		
(Uruguay) 1967	Did not qualify				EuroBasket served as qualifiers		
(Socialist Federal Republic of Yugoslavia) 1970	Did not qualify				EuroBasket served as qualifiers		
(Puerto Rico) 1974	Did not qualify				EuroBasket served as qualifiers		
(Philippines) 1978	Did not qualify				EuroBasket served as qualifiers		
(Colombia) 1982	Did not qualify				EuroBasket served as qualifiers		
(Spain) 1986	Did not enter				Did not enter		
(Argentina) 1990	Did not qualify				EuroBasket served as qualifiers		
(Canada) 1994	Did not qualify				EuroBasket served as qualifiers		
(Greece) 1998	Did not qualify				EuroBasket served as qualifiers		
(United States) 2002	Did not qualify				EuroBasket served as qualifiers		
(Japan) 2006	Did not qualify				EuroBasket served as qualifiers		
(Turkey) 2010	Did not qualify				EuroBasket served as qualifiers		
(Spain) 2014	Did not qualify				EuroBasket served as qualifiers		
(China) 2019	Did not qualify				10	3	7
(Philippines) (Japan) (Indonesia) 2023	Did not enter				Withdrew		
(Qatar) 2027	Did not qualify				14	6	8
(France) 2031	To be determined				To be determined		
Total	0/20				29	9	20

=== Olympic Games ===
Olympic Games					Qualifying		
Year	Position	Pld	W	L	Pld	W	L
(Nazi Germany) 1936	Did not enter						
(United Kingdom) 1948	Did not enter						
(Finland) 1952	Did not enter						
(Australia) 1956	Did not qualify						
(Italy) 1960	Did not qualify				5	1	4
(Japan) 1964	Did not enter				Did not enter		
(Mexico) 1968	Did not qualify				9	4	5
(West Germany) 1972	Did not qualify				4	1	3
(Canada) 1976	Did not enter				Did not enter		
(Soviet Union) 1980	Did not qualify				4	1	3
(United States) 1984	Did not qualify				3	0	3
(South Korea) 1988	Did not enter				Did not enter		
(Spain) 1992	Did not enter				Did not enter		
(United States) 1996	Did not qualify				Did not qualify		
(Australia) 2000	Did not qualify				Did not qualify		
(Greece) 2004	Did not qualify				Did not qualify		
(China) 2008	Did not qualify				Did not qualify		
(United Kingdom) 2012	Did not qualify				Did not qualify		
(Brazil) 2016	Did not qualify				Did not qualify		
(Japan) 2020	Did not qualify				Did not qualify		
(France) 2024	Did not qualify				Did not qualify		
(United States) 2028	To be determined				To be determined		
Total	0/21				25	7	18

=== Championship for Small Countries ===
FIBA European Championship for Small Countries
Year	Position	Pld	W	L
(Cyprus) 1992	1st place, gold medalist(s)	5	5	0
(San Marino) 1996	1st place, gold medalist(s)	5	5	0
Total		10	10	0

=== EuroBasket ===
EuroBasket					Qualification		
Year	Position	Pld	W	L	Pld	W	L
(Switzerland) 1935	Did not enter						
(Latvia) 1937	Did not enter						
(Lithuania) 1939	Did not enter						
(Switzerland) 1946	Did not enter						
(Czechoslovakia) 1947	12th	5	1	4			
(Egypt) 1949	Did not enter						
(France) 1951	11th	9	5	4			
(Soviet Union) 1953	Did not enter						
(Hungary) 1955	13th	10	4	6			
(Bulgaria) 1957	14th	10	2	8			
(Turkey) 1959	16th	7	1	6			
(Socialist Federal Republic of Yugoslavia) 1961	Did not enter						
(Poland) 1963	Did not qualify				2	1	1
(Soviet Union) 1965	Did not qualify				3	1	2
(Finland) 1967	Did not qualify				3	1	2
(Italy) 1969	Did not qualify				4	3	1
(West Germany) 1971	Did not qualify				4	1	3
(Spain) 1973	Did not qualify				6	2	4
(Socialist Federal Republic of Yugoslavia) 1975	Did not qualify				4	2	2
(Belgium) 1977	12th	7	0	7	15	11	4
(Italy) 1979	Did not qualify				5	0	5
(Czechoslovakia) 1981	Did not qualify				4	3	1
(France) 1983	Did not qualify				5	3	2
(West Germany) 1985	Did not qualify				5	3	2
(Greece) 1987	Did not qualify				9	4	5
(Socialist Federal Republic of Yugoslavia) 1989	Did not qualify				4	1	3
(Italy) 1991	Did not qualify				3	1	2
(Germany) 1993	Did not qualify				6	2	4
(Greece) 1995	Did not qualify				5	1	4
(Spain) 1997	Did not qualify				6	1	5
(France) 1999	Did not qualify				3	1	2
(Turkey) 2001	Did not qualify				16	5	11
(Sweden) 2003	Did not qualify				6	3	3
(Serbia and Montenegro) 2005	Division B				8	5	3
(Spain) 2007	Division B				8	3	5
(Poland) 2009	Division B				8	4	4
(Lithuania) 2011	Division B				6	4	2
(Slovenia) 2013	Did not qualify				8	3	5
(France) (Croatia) (Germany) (Latvia) 2015	Did not qualify				12	8	4
(Finland) (Israel) (Romania) (Turkey) 2017	Did not qualify				6	2	4
(Czech Republic) (Georgia (country)) (Italy) (Germany) 2022	Did not qualify				10	3	7
(Cyprus) (Finland) (Poland) (Latvia) 2025	Did not qualify				16	6	10
(Estonia) (Greece) (Slovenia) (Spain) 2029	To be determined				In progress		
Total	6/42	48	13	35	200	88	112

== Results and fixtures ==
Win Loss

=== 2025 ===
28 November 2025 2027 FIBA World Cup qualifiers – 1st round	Poland	90–78	Austria	Gdynia, Poland
20:45 (UTC+1)	Scoring by quarter: 22–18, 21–21, 26–21, 21–18
	Pts: Harding 32; Rebs: Ponitka 9 Asts: Harding 5	Boxscore	Pts: Landesberg 20; Rebs: Ogunsipe 8 Asts: Vujošević 6	Arena: Gdynia Arena; Attendance: 3,828; Referees: Martin Horozov (BUL), Carsten Straube (GER), Mehmet Şahin (TUR)

1 December 2025 2027 FIBA World Cup qualifiers – 1st round	Austria	68–86	Latvia	Vienna, Austria
20:20 (UTC+1)	Scoring by quarter: 24–20, 13–20, 17–29, 14–17
	Pts: Vujošević 27; Rebs: Vujošević 8 Asts: three players 3	Boxscore	Pts: Lomažs 24; Rebs: Šiliņš 5 Asts: Leimanis 6	Arena: Sport Arena Wien; Attendance: 1,000; Referees: Yener Yılmaz (TUR), Ivor Matějek (CZE), Viola Györgyi (NOR)

=== 2026 ===
27 February 2026 2027 FIBA World Cup qualifiers – 1st round	Austria	71–81	Netherlands	Vienna, Austria
18:00 (UTC+1)	Scoring by quarter: 13–17, 21–23, 19–15, 18–26
	Pts: Vujošević 23; Rebs: Schott 15; Asts: Vujošević 6	Boxscore	Pts: Van der Vuurst 25; Rebs: D. N'Guessan 13; Asts: Van der Vuurst 6	Arena: Sport Arena Wien; Attendance: 1,000; Referees: Geert Jacobs (BEL), Çisil Güngör (TUR), Andrea Bongiorni (ITA)

1 March 2026 2027 FIBA World Cup qualifiers – 1st round	Netherlands	87–88	Austria	The Hague, Netherlands
14:30 (UTC+1)	Scoring by quarter: 23–18, 27–25, 17–18, 20–27
	Pts: Franke, Van der Vuurst 17; Rebs: Kruithof 10; Asts: Van der Vuurst, Ververs 5	Boxscore	Pts: Schott 19; Rebs: Schott 11; Asts: Vujošević 13	Arena: Sportcampus Zuiderpark; Attendance: 3,455; Referees: Zafer Yılmaz (TUR), Alberto Sánchez (ESP), Blaž Zupančič (SVN)

3 July 2026 2027 FIBA World Cup qualifiers – 1st round	Austria	77–123	Poland	Vienna, Austria
18:00 (UTC+2)	Scoring by quarter: 16–24, 12–29, 29–28, 20–42
	Pts: Zeleznik 14; Rebs: Kapic 5 Asts: Jakupović 5	Boxscore	Pts: Kolenda 23; Rebs: Olejniczak 8 Asts: Łączyński 7	Arena: Sport Arena Wien; Attendance: 1,600; Referees: Yener Yılmaz (TUR), Ilias Kounellis (CYP), Nemanja Ninković (SRB)

6 July 2026 2027 FIBA World Cup qualifiers – 1st round	Latvia	112–66	Austria	Riga, Latvia
19:30 (UTC+3)	Scoring by quarter: 22–22, 32–20, 30–9, 28–15
	Pts: Laksa 20; Rebs: Ķilps 6 Asts: Skuja 10	Boxscore	Pts: Kapic 19; Rebs: Kapic 6 Asts: Friedrich 5	Arena: Xiaomi Arena; Attendance: 9,219; Referees: Boris Krejić (SVN), Ivor Matějek (CZE), Mehmet Şahin (TUR)

27 August 2026 EuroBasket 2029 pre-qualifiers – 2nd round	Cyprus	77–72	Austria	Limassol, Cyprus
19:00 (UTC+3)	Scoring by quarter: 16–20, 20–21, 20–14, 21–17
	Pts: F. Tigkas 25; Rebs: Pasiali 10; Asts: Michail 8	Boxscore	Pts: Mbemba 19; Rebs: Mbemba 10; Asts: Friedrich 4	Arena: Spyros Kyprianou Athletic Center; Attendance: 1,000; Referees: Marius Ciulin (ROU), Branimir Galić (CRO), Nemanja Ninković (SRB)

30 August 2026 EuroBasket 2029 pre-qualifiers – 2nd round	Austria	59–91	North Macedonia	Vienna, Austria
16:05 (UTC+2)	Scoring by quarter: 14–30, 16–19, 14–16, 15–26
	Pts: three players 9 Rebs: Dietz, Kapic 7 Asts: Vujošević 7	Boxscore	Pts: Efremovski 17; Rebs: Dimitrijević 14; Asts: Dimitrijević 11	Arena: Sport Arena Wien; Attendance: 1,100; Referees: Ilias Karapanos (GRE), Łukasz Jankowski (POL), Viktor Nagy (HUN)

29 November 2026 EuroBasket 2029 pre-qualifiers – 2nd round	Austria	vs.	Cyprus	Vienna, Austria
18:00 (UTC+1)
		Boxscore		Arena: Sport Arena Wien

=== 2027 ===
25 February 2027 EuroBasket 2029 pre-qualifiers – 2nd round	North Macedonia	vs.	Austria	North Macedonia
--:-- (UTC+1)
		Boxscore

== Team ==
=== Current roster ===
Roster for the EuroBasket 2029 Pre-Qualifiers matches on 27 and 30 August 2026 against Cyprus and North Macedonia.

Austria men's national basketball team roster
Players
Coaches

Pos.	No.	Name	Age – Date of birth	Height	Club	Ctr.
PG	0	Elvir Jakupović	24 – 9 October 2001	1.82 m (6 ft 0 in)	Flyers	(Austria)
G/F	1	Starlin Inoa	23 – 28 May 2003	1.98 m (6 ft 6 in)	Flyers	(Austria)
PG	3	Nico Zeleznik	19 – 5 October 2006	1.92 m (6 ft 4 in)	Klosterneuburg	(Austria)
SG	5	Bogić Vujošević	34 – 5 August 1992	1.92 m (6 ft 4 in)	Hercegovac	(Croatia)
PG	6	Daniel Friedrich	34 – 11 February 1992	1.80 m (5 ft 11 in)	Swans	(Austria)
SF	8	Florian Köppel	25 – 4 October 2000	2.01 m (6 ft 7 in)	Gunners	(Austria)
SF	9	Edi Patekar	26 – 24 February 2000	1.95 m (6 ft 5 in)	Gunners	(Austria)
C	11	Erik Dietz	18 – 30 September 2007	2.08 m (6 ft 10 in)	Traiskirchen	(Austria)
G/F	17	Erol Ersek	27 – 20 April 1999	1.95 m (6 ft 5 in)	Heidelberg	(Germany)
PG	21	Guylain Mbemba	22 – 15 October 2003	1.97 m (6 ft 6 in)	Colorado State	(United States)
SG	22	Jakob Löhr	24 – 23 August 2002	1.91 m (6 ft 3 in)	Swans	(Austria)
F	24	Nordin Kapic	22 – 30 September 2003	2.03 m (6 ft 8 in)	South Carolina	(United States)
G	77	Timo Lanmüller	25 – 17 March 2001	1.91 m (6 ft 3 in)	Vechta	(Germany)

Head coach

- (Croatia) Aramis Naglić

Assistant coach(es)

- (Austria) Benedikt Danek
- (Austria) Hubert Schmidt

Legend

- (C) Team captain
- Club – describes last
  club before the competition
- Age – describes age
  on 27 August 2026

=== Depth chart ===
Pos.	Starting 5	Bench 1	Bench 2
C	Jakob Pöltl	Marvin Ogunsipe
PF	Fynn Schott	Renato Poljak
SF	Sylven Landesberg	Edi Patekar	Aleksej Kostić
SG	Bogić Vujošević	Timo Lanmüller	Jakob Löhr
PG	Benedikt Güttl	Daniel Friedrich	Miro Zapf

=== Head coaches ===
- (Socialist Federal Republic of Yugoslavia) Miodrag Stefanović – (1951)
- (Socialist Federal Republic of Yugoslavia) Janos Gerdov – (1955)
- (Austria) Herbert Haselbacher – (1957–1959)
- (Czechoslovakia) Jan Hluchý – (1977)
- (Austria) Hubert Schreiner – (1986–2000)
- (Austria) Neno Ašćerić – (2008–2012)
- (Austria) Werner Sallomon – (2013–2016)
- (Lithuania) Kęstutis Kemzūra – (2016–2017)
- (Germany) Matthias Zollner – (2017–2018)
- (United States) Mike Coffin – (2018–2019)
- (Austria) Raoul Korner – (2020–2022)
- (United States) Chris O'Shea – (2022–2025)
- (Croatia) Aramis Naglić – (2025–present)

=== Notable players ===
- Jakob Pöltl – First Austrian-born player to get drafted and play in the NBA.

=== Past rosters ===
1947 EuroBasket: finished 12th among 14 teams

3 Frankl, 4 Hans Bohman, 5 Eder, 6 Ganglberger, 7 Franz Gluck, 8 Herbert Haselbacher, 9 Paulin, 10 Konrad Pitsch, 12 Helmut Schmidt, 13 Richard Pollak, 15 Otto Schreiweiss, 16 Vostatek, 17 Hans Zsak, 29 Walter Ledl (Coach: ?)

1951 EuroBasket: finished 11th among 17 teams

3 Hans Zsak, 5 Gerhard Puschner, 6 Peter Vecernik, 7 Richard Pollak, 8 Herbert Haselbacher, 10 Walter Ledl, 13 Felix Schober, 15 Franz Gluck, 16 Hans Bohman, 17 Benno Binder, 18 Ewald Polansky, 19 Hans Praschl (Coach: Miodrag Stefanović)

1955 EuroBasket: finished 13th among 18 teams

3 Gunter Brousek, 4 Karl Hackl, 5 Franz Gebhard, 6 Oskar Doppes, 7 Ewald Polansky, 8 Helmut Schmidt, 9 Karl Thiering, 10 Helmut Schurer, 11 Baczinsky, 12 Johann Karall, 13 Karl Machek, 14 Peter Vecernik, 15 Karl Privoznik, 17 Alfred Probst (Coach: Janos Gerdov)

1957 EuroBasket: finished 14th among 16 teams

3 Nikolaus Waldingbrett, 4 Gunter Brousek, 5 Johann Karall, 6 Friedrich Walz, 7 Ewald Polansky, 8 Herwig Schon, 9 Werner Grohs, 10 Karl Thiering, 11 Alfred Waschkau, 12 Helmut Schurer, 14 Franz Vranitzky, 15 Alfred Probst (Coach: Herbert Haselbacher)

1959 EuroBasket: finished 16th among 17 teams

3 Friedrich Walz, 4 Peter Kotas, 5 Franz Havlicek, 6 Oskar Doppes, 7 Ewald Polansky, 8 Herwig Schon, 9 Walter Ledl, 10 Karl Thiering, 11 Alfred Probst, 12 Heinz Vybiral, 13 Ernst Tutschek, 15 Karl Privoznik (Coach: Herbert Haselbacher)

1977 EuroBasket: finished 12th among 12 teams

4 Wolfgang Vlk, 5 Friedrich Miklas, 6 Bernhard Slavicek, 7 Peter Bilik, 8 Peter Poiger, 9 Herbert Watzke, 10 Erich Tecka, 11 Werner Meisinger, 12 Helmut Zimmel, 13 Walter Fuchs, 14 Peter Wolf, 15 Herbert Haselbacher (Coach: Jan Hluchy)

== Kit ==
=== Manufacturer ===
- 2015–2017: Spalding

=== Sponsor ===
- 2015–2017: Admiral (Sportwetten)

== See also ==
- Sport in Austria
- Austria women's national basketball team
- Austria men's national under-20 basketball team
- Austria men's national under-18 basketball team
- Austria men's national under-16 basketball team
