= Scotland men's national basketball team =

Scotland
- FIBA ranking: 88 (T)
- Joined FIBA: 1947
- FIBA zone: FIBA Europe
- National federation: Basketball Scotland

Olympic Games
- Appearances: Not eligible to compete

FIBA World Cup
- Appearances: None

EuroBasket
- Appearances: 2 (1951, 1957)
Home	Away

The Scotland national basketball team (Nickname: The Cabers) represents Scotland in international basketball competition. It is organised by basketballscotland, the sport's governing body in Scotland. Scotland joined FIBA in 1947; their direct affiliation to FIBA ended on 30 September 2016, after a transition period following the formation of the Great Britain national team in 2006. The only active international competition the team can now participate in is the basketball tournament at the Commonwealth Games.

== History ==
=== EuroBasket 1951 ===
The Scottish team's first European championship competition was at EuroBasket 1951 in Paris. They lost their eight games and finished 16th place out of 18. They outranked Luxembourg, who had had the misfortune of being in a five-team preliminary group instead of a four-team group (and losing all of their games), and Romania, who had dropped out of the tournament at the last minute.

=== EuroBasket 1957 ===
Six years later, at the EuroBasket 1957 in Sofia, Scotland competed much better. There, the squad won one of its three preliminary round games to be relegated to the classification round. The first match in that round pitted Scotland against Albania, who had also not yet achieved a victory in EuroBasket competition. The Scots proved the better, 69–56. Afterwards, they lost their next six matches but showed considerable improvement from the last tournament. They competed against Austria and West Germany the whole game until they finally ceded by one point and five points respectively to finish the classification round 1–6 in 15th place overall, ahead of Albania which they beat twice.

== Results and fixtures ==
Win Loss

=== 1940s ===
20 May 1947 Friendly	Scotland	14–42	England	Glasgow, Scotland

June 1949 Friendly	Scotland	28–32	England	Glasgow, Scotland

=== 1950s ===
1951 Friendly	Scotland	30–41	England	Falkirk, Scotland

04 May 1951 EuroBasket 1951 First Round	Czechoslovakia	103–18	Scotland	Paris, France

06 May 1951 EuroBasket 1951 First Round	Belgium	87–25	Scotland	Paris, France

07 May 1951 EuroBasket 1951 First Round	Germany	69–25	Scotland	Paris, France

08 May 1951 EuroBasket 1951 Classification Round	Finland	73–32	Scotland	Paris, France

09 May 1951 EuroBasket 1951 Classification Round	Netherlands	55–28	Scotland	Paris, France

10 May 1951 EuroBasket 1951 Classification Round	Denmark	47–41	Scotland	Paris, France

11 May 1951 EuroBasket 1951 Classification 13th-16th Place	Switzerland	68–19	Scotland	Paris, France

12 May 1951 EuroBasket 1951 Classification 15th-16th Place	Portugal	49–42	Scotland	Paris, France

1952 Friendly	England	32–29	Scotland	London, England

1954 Friendly	Scotland	50–59	England	Glasgow, Scotland

Nov 1955 Friendly	England	36–37	Scotland	London, England

1956 Friendly	Scotland	48–46	England	Kirkcaldy, Scotland

20 Jun 1957 EuroBasket 1957 First Round	Czechoslovakia	123–44	Scotland	Sofia, Bulgaria

21 Jun 1957 EuroBasket 1957 First Round	Yugoslavia (Socialist Federal Republic of Yugoslavia)	94–39	Scotland	Sofia, Bulgaria

22 Jun 1957 EuroBasket 1957 First Round	Albania	42–65	Scotland	Sofia, Bulgaria

23 Jun 1957 EuroBasket 1957 Classification Round	Albania	56–69	Scotland	Sofia, Bulgaria

24 Jun 1957 EuroBasket 1957 Classification Round	Italy	91–47	Scotland	Sofia, Bulgaria

25 Jun 1957 EuroBasket 1957 Classification Round	Turkey	100–54	Scotland	Sofia, Bulgaria

26 Jun 1957 EuroBasket 1957 Classification Round	Austria	48–47	Scotland	Sofia, Bulgaria

28 Jun 1957 EuroBasket 1957 Classification Round	Belgium	76–51	Scotland	Sofia, Bulgaria

29 Jun 1957 EuroBasket 1957 Classification Round	Finland	72–56	Scotland	Sofia, Bulgaria

30 Jun 1957 EuroBasket 1957 Classification Round	Germany	49–44	Scotland	Sofia, Bulgaria

=== 1960s ===
24 Feb 1967 EuroBasket 1967 Qualification	Hungary	98–66	Scotland	Oldenburg, Germany

25 Feb 1967 EuroBasket 1967 Qualification	West Germany	108–59	Scotland	Oldenburg, Germany

26 Feb 1967 EuroBasket 1967 Qualification	Netherlands	100–66	Scotland	Oldenburg, Germany

15 May 1969 EuroBasket 1969 Qualification	Romania	98–44	Scotland	Haarlem, Netherlands

16 May 1969 EuroBasket 1969 Qualification	Yugoslavia (Socialist Federal Republic of Yugoslavia)	108–47	Scotland	Haarlem, Netherlands

17 May 1969 EuroBasket 1969 Qualification	England	71–53	Scotland	Haarlem, Netherlands

18 May 1969 EuroBasket 1969 Qualification	Netherlands	103–76	Scotland	Haarlem, Netherlands

=== 1970s ===
May 1970 Friendly	Scotland	88–78	England	Edinburgh, Scotland

30 April 1971 EuroBasket 1971 Qualification	Czechoslovakia	111–50	Scotland	Le Mans, France

02 May 1971 EuroBasket 1971 Qualification	Switzerland	68–72	Scotland	Le Mans, France

03 May 1971 EuroBasket 1971 Qualification	France	99–46	Scotland	Le Mans, France

04 May 1971 EuroBasket 1971 Qualification	Greece	111–72	Scotland	Le Mans, France

07 May 1973 European Challenge 1973 First Round	Austria	101–69	Scotland	Vienna, Austria

08 May 1973 European Challenge 1973 First Round	Netherlands	95–66	Scotland	Vienna, Austria

11 May 1973 European Challenge 1973 First Round	Denmark	61–60	Scotland	Vienna, Austria

12 May 1973 European Challenge 1973 First Round	Israel	126–77	Scotland	Vienna, Austria

13 May 1973 European Challenge 1973 First Round	France	82–66	Scotland	Vienna, Austria

14 May 1973 European Challenge 1973 First Round	East Germany	91–54	Scotland	Vienna, Austria

12 May 1975 European Challenge 1975 First Round	France	88–63	Scotland	Boblingen, Germany

14 May 1975 European Challenge 1975 First Round	Hungary	109–72	Scotland	Boblingen, Germany

15 May 1975 European Challenge 1975 First Round	Algeria	74–73	Scotland	Boblingen, Germany

16 May 1975 European Challenge 1975 First Round	Austria	76–73	Scotland	Boblingen, Germany

7 April 1977 European Challenge 1977 Qualification	Denmark	77–100	Scotland	Hemel Hempstead, England

8 April 1977 European Challenge 1977 Qualification	Ireland (Republic of Ireland)	74–85	Scotland	Hemel Hempstead, England

9 April 1977 European Challenge 1977 Qualification	Luxembourg	57–73	Scotland	Hemel Hempstead, England

10 April 1977 European Challenge 1977 Qualification	England	72–79	Scotland	Hemel Hempstead, England

11 April 1977 European Challenge 1977 Qualification	Austria	79–69	Scotland	Hemel Hempstead, England

14 May 1977 European Challenge 1977 First Round	Poland	112–69	Scotland	Uppsala, Sweden

15 May 1977 European Challenge 1977 First Round	Sweden	95–62	Scotland	Uppsala, Sweden

16 May 1977 European Challenge 1977 First Round	Hungary	93–73	Scotland	Uppsala, Sweden

17 May 1977 European Challenge 1977 First Round	Netherlands	108–72	Scotland	Uppsala, Sweden

18 May 1977 European Challenge 1977 First Round	West Germany	93–78	Scotland	Uppsala, Sweden

04 Apr 1979 European Challenge 1979 Qualification Round	Luxembourg	92–98	Scotland	Luxembourg, Luxembourg

06 Apr 1979 European Challenge 1979 Qualification Round	Switzerland	76–94	Scotland	Luxembourg, Luxembourg

08 Apr 1979 European Challenge 1979 Qualification Round	Norway	67–80	Scotland	Luxembourg, Luxembourg

16 May 1979 European Challenge 1979 First Round	Romania	102–67	Scotland	Thessaloniki, Greece

17 May 1979 European Challenge 1979 First Round	Spain	113–68	Scotland	Thessaloniki, Greece

18 May 1979 European Challenge 1979 First Round	West Germany	104–55	Scotland	Thessaloniki, Greece

19 May 1979 European Challenge 1979 First Round	France	99–68	Scotland	Thessaloniki, Greece

20 May 1979 European Challenge 1979 First Round	Poland	84–58	Scotland	Thessaloniki, Greece

=== 1980s ===
12 Apr 1981 European Challenge 1981 Qualification Round	Iceland	82–69	Scotland	Sion, Switzerland

13 Apr 1981 European Challenge 1981 Qualification Round	Algeria	80–79	Scotland	Sion, Switzerland

15 Apr 1981 European Challenge 1981 Qualification Round	Portugal	81–71	Scotland	Sion, Switzerland

16 Apr 1981 European Challenge 1981 Qualification Round	Switzerland	96–94	Scotland	Sion, Switzerland

28 Apr 1982 European Challenge 1982 Qualification Round	Scotland	54–43	(Republic of Ireland) Ireland	Edinburgh, Scotland

29 Apr 1982 European Challenge 1982 Qualification Round	Scotland	86–74	Egypt	Edinburgh, Scotland

30 Apr 1982 European Challenge 1982 Qualification Round	Scotland	77–64	Iceland	Edinburgh, Scotland

01 May 1982 European Challenge 1982 Qualification Round	Scotland	75–100	Hungary	Edinburgh, Scotland

28 Apr 1982 European Challenge 1982 Qualification Round	Scotland	64–75	Austria	Edinburgh, Scotland

25 Apr 1984 European Challenge 1984 Qualification Round	Norway	103–74	Scotland	Oslo, Norway

26 Apr 1984 European Challenge 1984 Qualification Round	Portugal	66–56	Scotland	Oslo, Norway

27 Apr 1984 European Challenge 1984 Qualification Round	Denmark	87–74	Scotland	Oslo, Norway

29 Apr 1984 European Challenge 1984 Qualification Round	Iceland	96 (OT)–95	Scotland	Oslo, Norway

15 Apr 1986 European Challenge 1986 Qualification Round	Portugal	65–67	Scotland	Copenhagen, Denmark

16 Apr 1986 European Challenge 1986 Qualification Round	Iceland	75–71	Scotland	Copenhagen, Denmark

17 Apr 1986 European Challenge 1986 Qualification Round	Norway	86–83	Scotland	Copenhagen, Denmark

18 Apr 1986 European Challenge 1986 Qualification Round	Ireland (Republic of Ireland)	78–92	Scotland	Copenhagen, Denmark

03 Sep 1987 EuroBasket 1989 Qualification Tournament	Turkey	87–71	Scotland	Istanbul, Turkey

04 Sep 1987 EuroBasket 1989 Qualification Tournament	England	120–80	Scotland	Istanbul, Turkey

05 Sep 1987 EuroBasket 1989 Qualification Tournament	Sweden	109–85	Scotland	Istanbul, Turkey

11 May 1989 EuroBasket 1991 Qualification Tournament	West Germany	127–53	Scotland	Osnabrück, West Germany

12 May 1989 EuroBasket 1991 Qualification Tournament	Albania	101–82	Scotland	Osnabrück, West Germany

13 May 1989 EuroBasket 1991 Qualification Tournament	Turkey	105–61	Scotland	Osnabrück, West Germany

11 May 1989 EuroBasket 1991 Qualification Tournament	Poland	123–72	Scotland	Osnabrück, West Germany

=== 1990s ===
06 May 1991 EuroBasket 1993 Pre-Qualification	Switzerland	89 (2OT)–83	Scotland	Neuchatel, Switzerland

07 May 1991 EuroBasket 1993 Pre-Qualification	Luxembourg	63–74	Scotland	Neuchatel, Switzerland

08 May 1991 EuroBasket 1993 Pre-Qualification	Austria	71–85	Scotland	Neuchatel, Switzerland

09 May 1991 EuroBasket 1993 Pre-Qualification	Hungary	80–68	Scotland	Neuchatel, Switzerland

11 May 1991 EuroBasket 1993 Pre-Qualification	Cyprus	91–79	Scotland	Neuchatel, Switzerland

12 May 1991 EuroBasket 1993 Pre-Qualification	Turkey	83–66	Scotland	Neuchatel, Switzerland

21 Jun 1993 EuroBasket 1995 Qualifying Round	Austria	91–68	Scotland	Vienna, Austria

22 Jun 1993 EuroBasket 1995 Qualifying Round	Ukraine	101–64	Scotland	Vienna, Austria

23 Jun 1993 EuroBasket 1995 Qualifying Round	Netherlands	113–69	Scotland	Vienna, Austria

24 Jun 1993 EuroBasket 1995 Qualifying Round	Lithuania	117–69	Scotland	Vienna, Austria

27 Jun 1993 EuroBasket 1995 Qualifying Round	Iceland	81–78	Scotland	Vienna, Austria

23 May 1995 EuroBasket 1997 Qualifying Round	Austria	79–64	Scotland	Lugano, Switzerland

24 May 1995 EuroBasket 1997 Qualifying Round	Switzerland	85–52	Scotland	Lugano, Switzerland

25 May 1995 EuroBasket 1997 Qualifying Round	Romania	97–70	Scotland	Lugano, Switzerland

26 May 1995 EuroBasket 1997 Qualifying Round	Portugal	86–71	Scotland	Lugano, Switzerland

27 May 1995 EuroBasket 1997 Qualifying Round	Cyprus	70–61	Scotland	Lugano, Switzerland

28 May 1995 EuroBasket 1997 Qualifying Round	Iceland	111–69	Scotland	Lugano, Switzerland

05 Jun 1996 1996 European Promotion Cup Group Stage	Wales	76–64	Scotland	Serravalle, San Marino

06 Jun 1996 1996 European Promotion Cup Group Stage	Andorra	49–75	Scotland	Serravalle, San Marino

07 Jun 1996 1996 European Promotion Cup Group Stage	Austria	72–50	Scotland	Serravalle, San Marino

08 Jun 1996 1996 European Promotion Cup Classification 5th-8th Place	Malta	37–67	Scotland	Serravalle, San Marino

09 Jun 1996 1996 European Promotion Cup Classification 5th-6th Place	Andorra	71–77	Scotland	Serravalle, San Marino

24 Apr 1999 Friendly	Scotland	73–66	(Republic of Ireland) Ireland	Edinburgh, Scotland
		Report

=== 2000s ===
06 Jun 2000 2000 European Promotion Cup	Gibraltar	97–54	Scotland	Andorra la Vella, Andorra

07 Jun 2000 2000 European Promotion Cup	Wales	66–58	Scotland	Andorra la Vella, Andorra

08 Jun 2000 2000 European Promotion Cup	Malta	61–71	Scotland	Andorra la Vella, Andorra

09 Jun 2000 2000 European Promotion Cup	San Marino	81–64	Scotland	Andorra la Vella, Andorra

10 Jun 2000 2000 European Promotion Cup	Andorra	79–76	Scotland	Andorra la Vella, Andorra

11 Jun 2002 2002 European Promotion Cup Group Stage	Albania	80–92	Scotland	Ta'Qali, Malta

12 Jun 2002 2002 European Promotion Cup Group Stage	San Marino	66–62	Scotland	Ta'Qali, Malta

13 Jun 2002 2002 European Promotion Cup Group Stage	Malta	74–96	Scotland	Ta'Qali, Malta

14 Jun 2002 2002 European Promotion Cup Semi-finals	Wales	67–53	Scotland	Ta'Qali, Malta

15 Jun 2002 2002 European Promotion Cup Classification 3rd-4th Place	Andorra	80–94	Scotland	Ta'Qali, Malta

07 Jun 2004 2004 European Promotion Cup Group Stage	Malta	62–86	Scotland	Andorra la Vella, Andorra

09 Jun 2004 2004 European Promotion Cup Group Stage	Wales	71–92	Scotland	Andorra la Vella, Andorra

10 Jun 2004 2004 European Promotion Cup Group Stage	Albania	72–81	Scotland	Andorra la Vella, Andorra

11 Jun 2004 2004 European Promotion Cup Group Stage	Luxembourg	80–71	Scotland	Andorra la Vella, Andorra

12 Jun 2004 2004 European Promotion Cup Classification 3rd-4th Place	Azerbaijan	78–101	Scotland	Andorra la Vella, Andorra

21 May 2005 Spuerkeess Cup	England	78–49	Scotland	Luxembourg, Luxembourg
		Report

22 May 2005 Spuerkeess Cup	England	64–53	Scotland	Luxembourg, Luxembourg
		Report

31 July 2005 Friendly	England	101–75	Scotland
		Report

5 Aug 2005 Friendly	Angola	68–78	Scotland	Cape Town, South Africa
		Report

17 Mar 2006 2006 Commonwealth Games Group Stage	Australia	129–52	Scotland	Bendigo, Australia

19 Mar 2006 2006 Commonwealth Games Group Stage	India	57–67	Scotland	Geelong, Australia

20 Mar 2006 2006 Commonwealth Games Group Stage	Nigeria	91–83	Scotland	Bendigo, Australia

21 Mar 2006 2006 Commonwealth Games Classification 5th-8th Place	South Africa	79–91	Scotland	Melbourne, Australia

23 Mar 2006 2006 Commonwealth Games Classification 5th-6th Place	Barbados	73–63	Scotland	Melbourne, Australia

17 Jun 2008 FIBA EuroBasket 2008 Division C Group Stage	Scotland	58–49	Malta	Edinburgh, Scotland

18 Jun 2008 FIBA EuroBasket 2008 Division C Group Stage	Scotland	71–45	Wales	Edinburgh, Scotland

19 Jun 2008 FIBA EuroBasket 2008 Division C Group Stage	Scotland	84–81	Andorra	Edinburgh, Scotland

21 Jun 2008 FIBA EuroBasket 2008 Division C Semi-finals	Scotland	80–91	Azerbaijan	Edinburgh, Scotland

22 Jun 2008 FIBA EuroBasket 2008 Division C Classification 3rd-4th Place	Scotland	90–76	Andorra	Edinburgh, Scotland

=== 2010s ===
05 Jul 2010 FIBA EuroBasket 2010 Division C Group Stage	Denmark	88–68	Scotland	Valletta, Malta

06 Jul 2010 FIBA EuroBasket 2010 Division C Group Stage	San Marino	83–69	Scotland	Valletta, Malta

07 Jul 2010 FIBA EuroBasket 2010 Division C Group Stage	Malta	89–76	Scotland	Valletta, Malta

09 Jul 2010 FIBA EuroBasket 2010 Division C Classification 5th-8th Place	Gibraltar	42–78	Scotland	Valletta, Malta

10 Jul 2010 FIBA EuroBasket 2010 Division C Classification 5th-6th Place	Wales	75–49	Scotland	Valletta, Malta

02 Jul 2012 2012 FIBA European Championship for Small Countries Group Stage	Malta	75–64	Scotland	Serravalle, San Marino

03 Jul 2012 2012 FIBA European Championship for Small Countries Group Stage	San Marino	68–71	Scotland	Serravalle, San Marino

04 Jul 2012 2012 FIBA European Championship for Small Countries Group Stage	Wales	76–75	Scotland	Serravalle, San Marino

02 Jul 2012 2012 FIBA European Championship for Small Countries Classification 5th-7th Place	Gibraltar	60–84	Scotland	Serravalle, San Marino

07 Jul 2014 2014 FIBA European Championship for Small Countries Group Stage	Malta	87 (OT)–82	Scotland	Gibraltar

08 Jul 2014 2014 FIBA European Championship for Small Countries Group Stage	Wales	62–90	Scotland	Gibraltar

10 Jul 2014 2014 FIBA European Championship for Small Countries Quarter-finals	Gibraltar	32–55	Scotland	Gibraltar

11 Jul 2014 2014 FIBA European Championship for Small Countries Semi-finals	Andorra	84–63	Scotland	Gibraltar

12 Jul 2014 2014 FIBA European Championship for Small Countries Group Stage	San Marino	55–67	Scotland	Gibraltar

05 Apr 2018 2018 Commonwealth Games Group Stage	England	65–78	Scotland	Townsville, Australia

07 Apr 2018 2018 Commonwealth Games Group Stage	Cameroon	52–63	Scotland	Townsville, Australia

08 Apr 2018 2018 Commonwealth Games Group Stage	India	81–96	Scotland	Townsville, Australia

10 Apr 2018 2018 Commonwealth Games Qualifying final	Nigeria	61–66	Scotland	Cairns, Australia

14 Apr 2018 2018 Commonwealth Games Semi-finals	Australia	103–46	Scotland	Gold Coast, Australia

15 Apr 2018 2018 Commonwealth Games Classification 3rd-4th Place	New Zealand	79–69	Scotland	Gold Coast, Australia

== Players ==
=== Most Recent Roster ===
The following is the Scotland roster in the men's basketball tournament of the 2018 Commonwealth Games.

Scotland men's national basketball team - 2018 Commonwealth Games roster
Players
Coaches

Pos.	No.	Name	Age – Date of birth	Height	Club	Ctr.
F/C	0	Michael Vigor	27 – 17 September 1990	2.05 m (6 ft 9 in)	Bristol Flyers	(England)
G	6	Kyle Jimenez	19 – 3 May 1998	1.87 m (6 ft 2 in)	Glasgow Rocks	(Scotland)
G	7	Fraser Malcolm	21 – 23 May 1996	1.98 m (6 ft 6 in)	Black Hills State	(United States)
G	8	Bantu Burroughs	27 – 17 January 1991	1.83 m (6 ft 0 in)	Glasgow Rocks	(Scotland)
G	9	Jonathan Bunyan	25 – 1 June 1992	1.82 m (6 ft 0 in)	Glasgow Rocks	(Scotland)
G	10	Callan Low	17 – 11 November 2000	1.85 m (6 ft 1 in)	Myerscough	(England)
F	11	Gareth Murray	33 – 23 September 1984	2.01 m (6 ft 7 in)	Glasgow Rocks	(Scotland)
G	12	Sean Nealon-Lino	18 – 13 August 1999	1.93 m (6 ft 4 in)	Kent Crusaders	(England)
F	13	Nicholas Collins	33 – 11 July 1984	1.95 m (6 ft 5 in)	St Mirren	(Scotland)
C	14	Christopher Cleary	29 – 5 October 1988	2.00 m (6 ft 7 in)	Glasgow Rocks	(Scotland)
F	15	Alasdair Fraser	25 – 13 August 1992	2.01 m (6 ft 7 in)	Glasgow Rocks	(Scotland)
F/C	20	Kieron Achara (C)	34 – 3 July 1983	2.08 m (6 ft 10 in)	Glasgow Rocks	(Scotland)

Head coach

- (Australia) Rob Beveridge

Assistant coach(es)

- (Scotland) Craig Nicol

Legend

- (C) Team captain
- Club - describes last
  club before the tournament
- Age - describes age
  on 5 April 2018

=== Notable former players ===
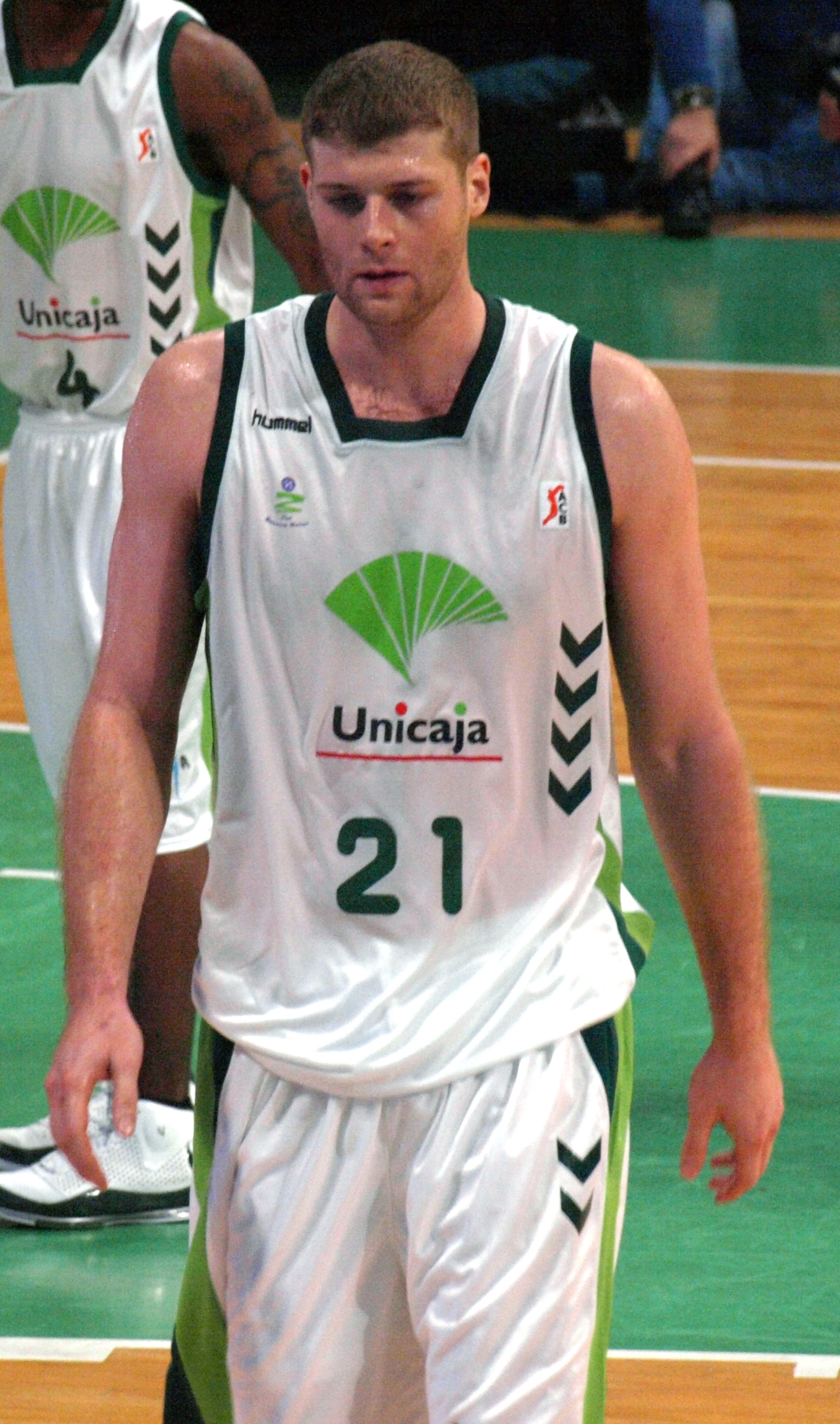
Robert Archibald is Scotland's most well known basketball player. Because of his accomplishments he became an inspirational figure to basketball players throughout his home country.

==== Robert Archibald ====
Robert was selected by the Memphis Grizzlies in the 2002 NBA draft with the third pick of the second round (32nd overall). Robert played a total of 44 NBA games across two seasons, before a successful career in Europe playing in the EuroLeague, Serie A and Liga ACB. Robert joined the Great Britain national team when it formed, winning the first of what would become 42 caps. He went on to represent Great Britain at EuroBasket 2009, EuroBasket 2011 and the 2012 Olympic Games.

==== Bill McInnes ====
Bill enjoyed a distinguished playing career with Boroughmuir in Edinburgh; he was a member of the team which dominated domestically in Scotland the 1960s and 1970s, and were British Rose Bowl champions in 1972. He also played on Boroughmuir teams that entered the FIBA European Champions Cup and FIBA European Cup Winners' Cup on five occasions in that time. He represented both Scotland and Great Britain on 176 occasions, starting all his 28 competitive GB games, and finishing as the leading scorer in eight of them. He was the leading scorer in the 1968 European Pre-Olympic event with 119 points in seven games. He was the second top scorer in 3 other Olympic qualifying events, finishing with 354 points, for a 12.6ppg average. Off the court, Bill was a founder member of Boroughmuir. Bill coached at all levels and was secretary to the club since 1961. He later served as Chair of the British Basketball Federation, was a member of the National Olympic Committee, Chair of the British Masters Basketball Association and was a director with Basketball Scotland, which he previously chaired from 1990 to 2008. He was awarded the FIBA Order of Merit posthumously after his death in 2017.

==== Kieron Achara ====
Kieron played college basketball at Duquesne University before turning professional in 2008 and embarking on a professional career at the highest levels in Italy, Spain, Greece, Bulgaria and Great Britain. He represented Scotland and Great Britain at national team level. He was the youngest player ever to play for the Scotland national team, featuring in the FIBA Europe Promotion Cup, and made his debut for Great Britain in 2008, shortly before turning professional. Achara was a part of the British Basketball team which took part in the London 2012 Olympics.

==== Iain Maclean ====
Iain, also known as Bull, played NCAA Division I college basketball at Northern Arizona University in 1986-87, as the first Scottish-born player to earn an NCAA Division 1 scholarship. He then played professionally with the dominant MIM Livingston and Livingston Bulls teams of the 1980s and 1990s, including winning the Carlsberg League playoffs and NatWest Trophy in the 1987-88 season.

== Coaches ==
Head Coach

- (Scotland) Ken Johnston (1965 – 1975)
- (Scotland) Abe Wood (1977)
- (United States) Kevin Cadle (1984 – 1990)
- (Scotland) Allan Turner (1990 – 1999)
- (Scotland) Toni Szifris (1999 – 2006)
- (Scotland) Iain MacLean (2007 – 2008)
- (Scotland) Tom Campbell (2009 – 2012)
- (Scotland) Iain MacLean (2012 – 2014)
- (England) Tony Garbelotto (2017 – 2018)
- (Australia) Rob Beveridge (2018)

== See also ==
- Kieron Achara
- Robert Archibald
- Iain MacLean
- Boroughmuir Blaze
- Great Britain national basketball team
- Sport in Scotland
- Basketball Scotland
- Andrew Joseph Steven
