= FIBA Men's World Ranking =

World ranking list

Top 20 Rankings as of 1 September 2026
Rank	Change	Team	Points
1	Steady	United States	952.3
2	Steady	Germany	877.4
3	▲1	France	870.9
4	▼1	Serbia	870.6
5	Steady	Canada	863
6	Steady	Spain	822.1
7	Steady	Australia	822
8	Steady	Argentina	809.2
9	▲2	Turkey	808.1
10	Steady	Lithuania	801.3
11	▼2	Brazil	799
12	Steady	Latvia	787.9
13	Steady	Greece	784.4
14	Steady	Slovenia	756.3
15	Steady	Italy	745.4
16	▲1	Finland	706
17	▼1	Puerto Rico	698.8
18	Steady	Montenegro	671.2
19	Steady	Poland	651.2
20	Steady	Georgia	614.7
*Change from 13 July 2026
Complete rankings at FIBA.basketball

The FIBA Men's World Ranking is FIBA's rankings of national basketball teams. FIBA ranks both men's and women's national teams for both senior and junior competitions. It also publishes combined rankings for all mixed-sex competitions. Excluded are the rankings for three-on-three competitions, which are tabulated for individual players.

The current ranking system, introduced in November 2025, compares teams based on the total rating points they earn in all games. Each game, both teams are awarded rating points based on the region and competition stage of the game, with additional multipliers applied to the winning team's points earned based on the strength of opponent, site of game and margin of victory.

The ranking is currently sponsored by Nike; as such, the names Nike FIBA World Ranking or FIBA World Ranking Men, presented by Nike are also used.

== History ==
In its ranking system before October 2017, FIBA used a competition-based system which awarded points based on the final standings of FIBA final tournaments. The system weighted all results within the eight-year period equally and did not consider the results of qualifiers.

From 2017 to 2025, FIBA used an updated ranking system which saw the ranking system switch to a game-based system which compared teams based on the weighted average rating points they earn in games over the last eight years. Teams earned a certain amount of rating points for each game (excluding friendlies) based on the margin of victory/defeat, site of game and strength of opponent. Each game's rating points were then weighted by factors including the time of game, competition/region, competition stage and round reached.

== Calculation ==
Only FIBA tournaments consisting of full five-a-side teams are used in calculations for the rankings. Other tournaments, such as regional championships, invitationals, three-on-three half-court basketball, and friendlies are omitted.

=== Points for losing team ===
The rating points awarded to the losing team, $G$, is calculated as follows:

$$G = B \cdot R \cdot S$$

Where:

- B – Base Factor (10)
- R – Region Factor
- S – Competition Stage Factor

Base Factor

To ensure a team's total rating points are on a comparable scale to the previous FIBA Men's World Ranking system, a Base Factor B is set to 10.

Region Factor

A Region Factor R is calculated taking into account results of matches between teams of different regions such as during the FIBA Basketball World Cup and the Olympic Games, with the factor updated every four years. For 2025–29 the factor for each region's competitions (including FIBA Basketball World Cup qualifiers) are as follows:

- 1.00 – Competitions involving teams from multiple regions (such as the FIBA Basketball World Cup and the Olympic Games)
- 1.00 – FIBA Europe
- 0.93 – FIBA Americas
- 0.69 – FIBA Africa
- 0.68 – FIBA Asia and FIBA Oceania

Competition Stage Factor

To rewards teams for progression in competitions, a Competition Stage Factor S is applied:

Competition stage		Continental championship (Note: Excluding the FIBA European Championship for Small Countries which has a factor of 0.2 applied to all games.)	Olympics	FIBA Basketball World Cup
Pre-qualifiers		0.4	0.15	0.4
Qualifiers		0.8	0.30	Q1: 1.0 (Note: Q1 and Q2 denote the first and second round of World Cup qualifiers respectively.); Q2: 1.2
Final tournament	Group stage	1.0	1.75	2.0
Final tournament	Classification (9th-16th)	1.0	1.75	2.0
Final tournament	Round of 16	2.0	3.5	4.0
Final tournament	Quarter-final	2.5	4.375	5.0
Final tournament	Classification (5th-8th)	2.0	3.5	4.0
Final tournament	Semi-final	3.5	6.125	7.0
Final tournament	3rd place game	3.0	5.25	6.0
Final tournament	Final	4.0	7.0	8.0

=== Points for winning team ===
The rating points awarded to the winning team, $G_{w}$, is calculated as follows:

$$G_{w} = G \cdot W \cdot O \cdot A \cdot M$$

Where:

- G – Rating points awarded to the losing team (see above)
- W – Winning Factor (1.25)
- O – Opponent Rating Factor
- A – Away Game Factor
- M – Margin of Victory Factor

Winning Factor

To ensure the winning team receives more rating points than the losing team, a Winning Factor W is set to 1.25.

Opponent Rating Factor

To recognize wins against more difficult teams, an Opponent Rating Factor O is calculated as follows:

$$O = 1 + 0.0001 \cdot T_{L}$$

where $T_{L}$ represents the pre-game total rating points of the opposing team

Away Game Factor

On average, it is more difficult to win away from home. An Away Game Factor A is awarded based on the site of the game as follows:

- 1.1 – The winning team played away from home
- 1.0 – The winning team played at home, or the game was at a neutral venue

Margin of Victory Factor

A Margin of Victory Factor M is applied as follows:

- 1.20 – Win by 30 or more points
- 1.05 – Win by 15–29 points
- 1.00 – Win by less than 15 points

== Cycle and updates ==
The rankings are updated and published after every major FIBA tournament and qualifier windows.

Before each major event (FIBA Basketball World Cup, Olympic Basketball Tournament and continental championships), all team's total rating points are discounted by 33%, to ensure the rating points do not grow indefinitely. With all teams having their points reduced by the same factor, the ranking remains the same after each discounting update.

== FIBA Boy's World Ranking ==
In 2010, FIBA launched a separate FIBA Boy's World Ranking which is a combined ranking for men's youth teams based on results in under-16 to under-19 age group competitions. Before 2010, the results of both youth and senior teams were used to determine the men's world ranking.
