= Wales men's national basketball team =

Wales
- FIBA ranking: None
- Joined FIBA: 1956
- FIBA zone: FIBA Europe
- National federation: Basketball Wales
- Coach: James Bamfield

Olympic Games
- Appearances: Not eligible to compete

FIBA World Cup
- Appearances: None

EuroBasket
- Appearances: None
Home	Away

The Welsh national basketball team is the basketball side that represents Wales in international competition. They are organised by Basketball Wales, the sport's governing body in Wales.

In 2005, Wales, along with England Basketball and basketballscotland combined forces to form the Great Britain national basketball team, with the target goal to field a competitive team capable of winning medals at the 2012 Summer Olympics in London. England's and Scotland's affiliation to FIBA will end on 30 September 2016, but Wales did not sign the agreement with the British Basketball Federation and FIBA.

== Current roster ==
At the 2016 FIBA European Championship for Small Countries:

Wales men's national basketball team roster
Players
Coaches

Pos.	No.	Name	Age – Date of birth	Height	Club	Ctr.
SG	4	Lloyd Roberts	27 – 26 May 1989	1.90 m (6 ft 3 in)
PF	15	Leto Mayalu	32 – 16 May 1991	2.05 m (6 ft 9 in)
SG	6	Robert Smith	22 – 18 December 1993	1.90 m (6 ft 3 in)
SG	7	Asa Waite	29 – 8 August 1986	1.90 m (6 ft 3 in)
SG	8	James Dawe	29 – 21 May 1987	1.87 m (6 ft 2 in)
PG	9	Owen Williams	28 – 25 February 1988	1.78 m (5 ft 10 in)
PG	10	Daniel Walsh	21 – 4 March 1995	1.85 m (6 ft 1 in)
SF	11	Damian Edwards	26 – 25 June 1990	1.98 m (6 ft 6 in)
SG	12	Ben Potts	31 – 16 January 1985	1.93 m (6 ft 4 in)
C	13	Alan Duppa	36 – 18 April 1980	2.01 m (6 ft 7 in)
SG	14	Edris Kizito	36 – 10 March 1980	1.91 m (6 ft 3 in)
C	15	Gareth Priddle	31 – 14 March 1985	2.01 m (6 ft 7 in)
SF	17	Rhys Farrell	25 – 26 December 1996	1.93 m (6 ft 4 in)

Head coach

- James Bamfield

Assistant coaches

- Thomas Guntrip
- Andrew Purnell
- Azeb Smalley

Physiotherapist

- Marc Wheeler

Legend

- Club – describes last
  club before the tournament
- Age – describes age
  on 28 June 2016

== International appearances ==
Wales has yet to appear in a major international basketball event. Currently, Wales is set in FIBA European Championship for Small Countries. The best result there so far has been 2nd place in both 1998 and 2002.

== Competitions ==
=== Performance at Summer Olympics ===
Year	Position	Note	Tournament	Host
1948	20	Played alongside England and Scotland as Great Britain	Basketball at the 1948 Summer Olympics	London, England
2012	9	Played alongside England and Scotland as Great Britain	Basketball at the 2012 Summer Olympics	London, England

=== Performance at FIBA World championships ===
yet to qualify

=== Performance at Eurobasket ===
Year	Position	Note	Tournament	Host
2009	13	Played alongside England and Scotland as Great Britain	FIBA EuroBasket 2009	Katowice, Poland
2011	13	Played alongside England and Scotland as Great Britain	FIBA EuroBasket 2011	Kaunas, Lithuania
2013	13	Played alongside England and Scotland as Great Britain	FIBA EuroBasket 2013	Ljubljana, Slovenia
2017	22	Played alongside England and Scotland as Great Britain	FIBA EuroBasket 2017	Istanbul, Helsinki, Tel Aviv, Cluj-Napoca Turkey, Finland, Israel, Romania
2022	24	played alongside England and Scotland as Great Britain	FIBA EuroBasket 2022	Berlin, Cologne, Prague, Tbilisi, Milan Germany, Czech Republic, Georgia, Italy
2025	TBD	Will play alongside England and Scotland as Great Britain	FIBA EuroBasket 2025	Riga, Limassol, Tampere, Katowice Latvia, Cyprus, Finland, Poland

== See also ==
- Basketball Wales
- Great Britain national basketball team
- Sport in Wales
- Wales women's national basketball team
