= Basketball at the Games of the Small States of Europe =

Basketball 5x5 at the Games of the Small States of Europe has been contested at all the editions of the Games of the Small States of Europe except at the ones hosted in Liechtenstein, and the most recent edition in Andorra in 2025.

== Men's tournament ==
Year	Gold	Silver	Bronze
(San Marino) 1985	Cyprus	Luxembourg	Malta
(Monaco) 1987	Monaco	Iceland	Malta
(Cyprus) 1989	Andorra	Cyprus	Iceland
(Andorra) 1991	Iceland	Luxembourg	Cyprus
(Malta) 1993	Iceland	Cyprus	Luxembourg
(Luxembourg) 1995	Cyprus	Luxembourg	Iceland
(Iceland) 1997	Cyprus	Malta	Iceland
(Liechtenstein) 1999	—N/a		
(San Marino) 2001	Cyprus	Iceland	San Marino
(Malta) 2003	Cyprus	Iceland	Luxembourg
(Andorra) 2005	Cyprus	Iceland	Luxembourg
(Monaco) 2007	Iceland	Luxembourg	San Marino
(Cyprus) 2009	Cyprus	Luxembourg	Andorra
(Liechtenstein) 2011	—N/a		
(Luxembourg) 2013	Cyprus	Luxembourg	Iceland
(Iceland) 2015	Montenegro	Iceland	Luxembourg
(San Marino) 2017	Cyprus	Montenegro	Iceland
(Montenegro) 2019	Montenegro	Luxembourg	Iceland
(Malta) 2023	Luxembourg	Malta	Cyprus

=== Performance by country ===
Rank	Nation	Gold	Silver	Bronze	Total
1	Cyprus	9	2	2	13
2	Iceland	3	5	6	14
3	Montenegro	2	1	0	3
4	Luxembourg	1	7	4	12
5	Andorra	1	0	1	2
6	Monaco	1	0	0	1
7	Malta	0	2	2	4
8	San Marino	0	0	2	2
Totals (8 entries)		17	17	17	51

=== Participation details ===
Team	(San Marino) 1985	(Monaco) 1987	(Cyprus) 1989	(Andorra) 1991	(Malta) 1993	(Luxembourg) 1995	(Iceland) 1997	(San Marino) 2001	(Malta) 2003	(Andorra) 2005	(Monaco) 2007	(Cyprus) 2009	(Luxembourg) 2013	(Iceland) 2015	(San Marino) 2017	(Montenegro) 2019	(Malta) 2023
Andorra	4th		1st	4th	4th	6th	6th	7th	5th	5th	4th	3rd	4th	4th	5th		
Cyprus	1st	5th	2nd	3rd	2nd	1st	1st	1st	1st	1st	DQ	1st	1st		1st	5th	3rd
Iceland		2nd	3rd	1st	1st	3rd	3rd	2nd	2nd	2nd	1st	4th	3rd	2nd	3rd	3rd	
Luxembourg	2nd	6th	4th	2nd	3rd	2nd	4th	5th	3rd	3rd	2nd	2nd	2nd	3rd	4th	2nd	1st
Malta	3rd	3rd	5th	5th	6th	5th	2nd	6th	7th			5th				4th	2nd
Monaco		1st	6th	6th				4th	6th		5th						
Montenegro	Did not participate at the Games of the Small States of Europe													1st	2nd	1st	4th
San Marino		4th	7th	7th	5th	4th	5th	3rd	4th	4th	3rd	6th	5th		6th		

== Women's tournament ==
Year	Gold	Silver	Bronze
(San Marino) 1985	—N/a		
(Monaco) 1987	—N/a		
(Cyprus) 1989	Luxembourg	Iceland	Cyprus
(Andorra) 1991	Luxembourg	Cyprus	Iceland
(Malta) 1993	Luxembourg	Iceland	Malta
(Luxembourg) 1995	Luxembourg	Iceland	Cyprus
(Iceland) 1997	Iceland	Luxembourg	Malta
(Liechtenstein) 1999	—N/a		
(San Marino) 2001	—N/a		
(Malta) 2003	Malta	Cyprus	Iceland
(Andorra) 2005	Luxembourg	Iceland	Malta
(Monaco) 2007	—N/a		
(Cyprus) 2009	Malta	Iceland	Luxembourg
(Liechtenstein) 2011	—N/a		
(Luxembourg) 2013	Luxembourg	Iceland	Cyprus
(Iceland) 2015	Luxembourg	Iceland	Malta
(San Marino) 2017	Malta	Iceland	Luxembourg
(Montenegro) 2019	Montenegro	Iceland	Luxembourg
(Malta) 2023	Montenegro	Luxembourg	Cyprus

=== Performance by country ===
Rank	Nation	Gold	Silver	Bronze	Total
1	Luxembourg	7	2	2	11
2	Malta	3	0	4	7
3	Montenegro	2	0	0	2
4	Iceland	1	9	2	12
5	Cyprus	0	2	5	7
Totals (5 entries)		13	13	13	39

=== Participation details ===
Team	(Cyprus) 1989	(Andorra) 1991	(Malta) 1993	(Luxembourg) 1995	(Iceland) 1997	(Malta) 2003	(Andorra) 2005	(Cyprus) 2009	(Luxembourg) 2013	(Iceland) 2015	(San Marino) 2017	(Montenegro) 2019	(Malta) 2023
Andorra							4th						
Cyprus	3rd	2nd	4th	3rd	4th	2nd		3rd	3rd		4th	6th	3rd
Iceland	2nd	3rd	2nd	2nd	1st	3rd	2nd	2nd	2nd	2nd	2nd	2nd	
Luxembourg	1st	1st	1st	1st	2nd	4th	1st	4th	1st	1st	3rd	3rd	2nd
Malta		4th	3rd	4th	3rd	1st	3rd	1st	4th	3rd	1st	4th	4th
Monaco	4th									4th		5th	
Montenegro	Did not participate at the Games of the Small States of Europe											1st	1st
