= Basketball at the 2025 Games of the Small States of Europe =

Tournament details
- Host country: Andorra
- Dates: 27–31 May
- Teams: 4
- Venue: Pavelló Joan Alay

Final positions
- Champions: Montenegro (3rd title)
- Runners-up: Luxembourg
- Third place: Cyprus
- Fourth place: Andorra

Tournament statistics
- Games played: 10
- Top scorer: (Luxembourg) Anne Simon (61 points) (12.2 ppg)

Basketball at the 2025 Games of the Small States of Europe was held from 27 to 31 May 2025 in Andorra La Vella. Similar to 2023, only a women's basketball event took place.

Montenegro won their third gold medal after beating Luxembourg in the final.

Cyprus took bronze after triumphing over hosts Andorra in the bronze medal game.

== Teams ==
Team	App	First	Last	Streak	Best placement in tournament	WR
Andorra ^{H}	2nd	2005		1	Fourth place (2005)	104
Cyprus	12th	1989	2023	4	Runners-up (1991, 2003)	78
Luxembourg	14th	1989	2023	14	Champions (1989, 1991, 1993, 1995, 2005, 2013, 2015)	50
Montenegro	3rd	2019	2023	3	Champions (2019, 2023)	19

== Venue ==
The venue was the Pavelló Joan Alay in Andorra's capital, Andorra La Vella.

== Group ==
Pos	Team	Pld	W	L	PF	PA	PD	Pts
1	Luxembourg	3	3	0	239	128	+111	6
2	Montenegro	3	2	1	251	140	+111	5
3	Cyprus	3	1	2	170	174	−4	4
4	Andorra (H)	3	0	3	82	300	−218	3

Source: GSSE
Rules for classification: 1) Points; 2) Head-to-head results; 3) Points difference; 4) Points scored.
(H) Hosts

27 May 2025
17:30

Boxscore

Luxembourg	63–41	Cyprus
Scoring by quarter: 12–12, 16–11, 21–9, 14–9
Pts: Simon 17		Pts: Pilakouta 17

Pavelló Joan Alay, Andorra La Vella

27 May 2025
20:00

Boxscore

Andorra	24–111	Montenegro
Scoring by quarter: 4–32, 10–20, 6–37, 4–22
Pts: Rodriguez 7		Pts: Savkovic 16

Pavelló Joan Alay, Andorra La Vella

28 May 2025
17:30

Boxscore

Cyprus	52–85	Montenegro
Scoring by quarter: 12–23, 9–17, 13–22, 18–23
Pts: Pilakouta 13		Pts: Zivaljevic 15

Pavelló Joan Alay, Andorra La Vella

28 May 2025
20:00

Boxscore

Luxembourg	112–32	Andorra
Scoring by quarter: 32–7, 28–9, 31–7, 21–9
Pts: Baum 21		Pts: Marrugat, Santamaria 6

Pavelló Joan Alay, Andorra La Vella

29 May 2025
17:30

Boxscore

Montenegro	55–64	Luxembourg
Scoring by quarter: 18–17, 8–13, 13–15, 16–19
Pts: Kovacevic, Zivaljevic 11		Pts: Etute 19

Pavelló Joan Alay, Andorra La Vella

29 May 2025
20:00

Boxscore

Andorra	26–77	Cyprus
Scoring by quarter: 7–20, 5–24', 7–21, 7–12
Pts: Marrugat 9		Pts: Pilakouta 14

Pavelló Joan Alay, Andorra La Vella

== Knockout stage ==
=== Bracket ===
Semi-finals
30 May
Luxembourg	90
Andorra	35
30 May
Montenegro	70
Cyprus	46

Final
31 May
Luxembourg	56
Montenegro	68
Third place
31 May
Andorra	44
Cyprus	58

=== Semifinals ===
30 May 2025
17:30

Boxscore

Luxembourg	90–35	Andorra
Scoring by quarter: 28–10, 30–8, 16–5, 16–12
Pts: Simon 16		Pts: Fernández 15

Pavelló Joan Alay, Andorra La Vella

30 May 2025
20:00

Boxscore

Montenegro	70–46	Cyprus
Scoring by quarter: 23–5, 14–11, 11–24, 22–6
Pts: Bulajic 18		Pts: Chenaklieva 19

Pavelló Joan Alay, Andorra La Vella

=== Third place game ===
31 May 2025
10:00

Boxscore

Andorra	44–58	Cyprus
Scoring by quarter: 11–11, 12–18, 12–17, 9–12
Pts: Solano 11		Pts: Pangalos 13

Pavelló Joan Alay, Andorra La Vella

=== Final ===
31 May 2025
12:30

Boxscore

Luxembourg	56–68	Montenegro
Scoring by quarter: 20–20, 15–13, 10–15, 11–20
Pts: Etute 11		Pts: Jovanovic 22

Pavelló Joan Alay, Andorra La Vella

== Final rankings ==
Rank	Team
Gold medal	Montenegro
Silver medal	Luxembourg
Bronze medal	Cyprus
4	Andorra

=== Medalists ===
Event	Gold	Silver	Bronze
Women's 5×5	Montenegro; Marija Baošić; Maja Bigović; Milena Bigović; Jelena Bulajić; Nikolina Ilić; Milica Jovanović; Bojana Kovačević; Marija Leković; Jovana Pašić; Zorana Radonjić; Jovana Savković; Sofija Živaljević	Luxembourg; Joy Baum; Charlie Bidinger; Faith Etute; Joyce Etute; Laurie Irthum; Jovana Jakšić; Dionne Madjo; Magaly Meynadier; Svenia Nürenberg; Jo Oly; Anne Simon; Esmeralda Skrijelj	Cyprus; Veatriki Akathiotou; Emelia Georgiou; Maria Konstantinou; Ioanna Kyprianou; Eleni Oikonomidou; Marissa Ariella Pangalos; Despina Papaioannou; Eleni Pilakouta; Tijana Raca; Sofia Stylianidi; Kyriaki Taylor; Styliana Velinova Chenaklieva
