= Montenegro national basketball team results =

The Montenegrin national basketball team represents Montenegro in men's international basketball tournaments. It is organized by the Basketball Federation of Montenegro (Montenegrin: Кошаркашки Савез Црне Горе, КСЦГ; Košarkaški Savez Crne Gore, KSCG), which is the governing body of basketball in Montenegro. This team competes in the European region of FIBA.

== Records ==
Largest home victory
102-58, Montenegro – Iceland, 26 August 2009, Podgorica
Largest away victory
37-100, San Marino – Montenegro, 2 June 2017, Serravalle
Largest home defeat
65-80, Montenegro – Israel, 20 August 2014, Podgorica
Largest away defeat
99-60, Spain – Montenegro, 1 September 2017, Cluj-Napoca
Longest winning streak
13 matches, (6 September 2008 - 14 August 2010)
Longest losing streak
4 matches, (1 September 2011 - 5 September 2011; 1 September 2019 - 9 September 2019)
Most scored points in a match
113, Albania – Montenegro 73-113
Least scored points in a match
55, Greece – Montenegro 71–55, Netherlands – Montenegro 68-55
Most conceded points in a match
100, Latvia – Montenegro 100-68
Least conceded points in a match
37, San Marino – Montenegro 37-100
Highest home attendance
5,500, Montenegro – Serbia 72–62, 2 September 2012, Podgorica
Highest away attendance
18,000, Serbia – Montenegro 71–73, 18 August 2012, Belgrade

== List of official matches ==
Montenengro played its first official match at September 2008. Below is a list of all official matches played by the national team since Montenegrin independence.

Win Loss

| Date | Opponent | Result | Venue | Att | Competition |
|---|---|---|---|---|---|
| 06/09/2008 | Netherlands | 70–63 | Almere | 1,500 | Division B |
| 13/09/2008 | Austria | 96–73 | Podgorica | 3,000 | Division B |
| 17/09/2008 | Iceland | 80–66 | Reykjavík | 1,000 | Division B |
| 20/09/2008 | Denmark | 96–60 | Podgorica | 3,000 | Division B |
| 15/08/2009 | Netherlands | 93–68 | Podgorica | 3,500 | Division B |
| 22/08/2009 | Austria | 86–63 | Oberwart | 1,500 | Division B |
| 26/08/2009 | Iceland | 102–58 | Podgorica | 2,500 | Division B |
| 29/08/2009 | Denmark | 82–65 | Farum | 1,400 | Division B |
| 05/09/2009 | Sweden | 70–50 | Norrköping | 4,000 | Division B |
| 09/09/2009 | Sweden | 88–71 | Podgorica | 2,500 | Division B |
| 02/08/2010 | Latvia | 96–66 | Podgorica | 4,000 | EuroBasket 2011 qualifiers |
| 05/08/2010 | Finland | 74–60 | Vantaa | 2,000 | EuroBasket 2011 qualifiers |
| 11/08/2010 | Italy | 71–62 | Bijelo Polje | 3,500 | EuroBasket 2011 qualifiers |
| 14/08/2010 | Israel | 73–77 | Tel Aviv | 11,000 | EuroBasket 2011 qualifiers |
| 17/08/2010 | Latvia | 90–84 | Riga | 4,000 | EuroBasket 2011 qualifiers |
| 20/08/2010 | Finland | 91–71 | Bar | 3,000 | EuroBasket 2011 qualifiers |
| 26/08/2010 | Italy | 71–72 | Bari | 3,500 | EuroBasket 2011 qualifiers |
| 29/08/2010 | Israel | 79–69 | Podgorica | 5,000 | EuroBasket 2011 qualifiers |
| 31/08/2011 | (North Macedonia) Macedonia | 70–65 | Alytus | 1,000 | EuroBasket 2011 |
| 01/09/2011 | Bosnia and Herzegovina | 86–94 | Alytus | 1,000 | EuroBasket 2011 |
| 03/09/2011 | Croatia | 81–87 | Alytus | 2,500 | EuroBasket 2011 |
| 04/09/2011 | Greece | 55–71 | Alytus | 2,000 | EuroBasket 2011 |
| 05/09/2011 | Finland | 65–71 | Alytus | 1,500 | EuroBasket 2011 |
| 15/08/2012 | Israel | 75–69 | Podgorica | 4,000 | EuroBasket 2013 qualifiers |
| 18/08/2012 | Serbia | 73–71 | Belgrade | 18,000 | EuroBasket 2013 qualifiers |
| 21/08/2012 | Estonia | 77–64 | Tallinn | 6,000 | EuroBasket 2013 qualifiers |
| 24/08/2012 | Iceland | 85–67 | Nikšić | 4,200 | EuroBasket 2013 qualifiers |
| 27/08/2012 | Slovakia | 94–81 | Levice | 1,000 | EuroBasket 2013 qualifiers |
| 30/08/2012 | Israel | 81–76 | Tel Aviv | 10,000 | EuroBasket 2013 qualifiers |
| 02/09/2012 | Serbia | 72–62 | Podgorica | 5,500 | EuroBasket 2013 qualifiers |
| 05/09/2012 | Estonia | 76–67 | Podgorica | 4,500 | EuroBasket 2013 qualifiers |
| 08/09/2012 | Iceland | 101–92 | Reykjavík | 1,200 | EuroBasket 2013 qualifiers |
| 11/09/2012 | Slovakia | 80–48 | Podgorica | 4,000 | EuroBasket 2013 qualifiers |
| 04/09/2013 | (North Macedonia) Macedonia | 81–80 | Jesenice | 2,400 | EuroBasket 2013 |
| 05/09/2013 | Latvia | 72–73 | Jesenice | 1,600 | EuroBasket 2013 |
| 06/09/2013 | Bosnia and Herzegovina | 70–76 | Jesenice | 2,500 | EuroBasket 2013 |
| 07/09/2013 | Lithuania | 70–77 | Jesenice | 3,000 | EuroBasket 2013 |
| 09/09/2013 | Serbia | 83–76 | Jesenice | 4,500 | EuroBasket 2013 |
| 10/08/2014 | Israel | 100–97 | Nicosia | 400 | EuroBasket 2015 qualifiers |
| 13/08/2014 | Bulgaria | 70–64 | Podgorica | 2,000 | EuroBasket 2015 qualifiers |
| 17/08/2014 | Netherlands | 60–65 | Podgorica | 2,200 | EuroBasket 2015 qualifiers |
| 20/08/2014 | Israel | 65–80 | Podgorica | 4,200 | EuroBasket 2015 qualifiers |
| 24/08/2014 | Bulgaria | 84–73 | Sofia | 500 | EuroBasket 2015 qualifiers |
| 27/08/2014 | Netherlands | 55–68 | Leiden | 2,500 | EuroBasket 2015 qualifiers |
| 02/06/2015 | Luxembourg | 85–58 | Reykjavík | 500 | Games of the Small States 2015 |
| 04/06/2015 | Andorra | 89–69 | Reykjavík | 300 | Games of the Small States 2015 |
| 06/06/2015 | Iceland | 102–84 | Reykjavík | 1,000 | Games of the Small States 2015 |
| 31/08/2016 | Slovakia | 97–65 | Podgorica | 4,000 | EuroBasket 2017 qualifiers |
| 03/09/2016 | Albania | 113–73 | Tirana | 1,200 | EuroBasket 2017 qualifiers |
| 07/09/2016 | (Georgia (country)) Georgia | 76–74 | Tbilisi | 9,800 | EuroBasket 2017 qualifiers |
| 10/09/2016 | Slovakia | 99–62 | Nitra | 2,000 | EuroBasket 2017 qualifiers |
| 14/09/2016 | Albania | 94–56 | Bar | 2,200 | EuroBasket 2017 qualifiers |
| 17/09/2016 | (Georgia (country)) Georgia | 84–90 | Bar | 3,000 | EuroBasket 2017 qualifiers |
| 30/05/2017 | Luxembourg | 79–57 | Serravalle | 200 | Games of the Small States 2017 |
| 31/05/2017 | Andorra | 90–49 | Serravalle | 100 | Games of the Small States 2017 |
| 01/06/2017 | Cyprus | 71–81 | Serravalle | 300 | Games of the Small States 2017 |
| 02/06/2017 | San Marino | 100–37 | Serravalle | 300 | Games of the Small States 2017 |
| 03/06/2017 | Iceland | 86–61 | Serravalle | 100 | Games of the Small States 2017 |
| 01/09/2017 | Spain | 60–99 | Cluj-Napoca | 2,300 | EuroBasket 2017 |
| 02/09/2017 | Hungary | 72–48 | Cluj-Napoca | 2,500 | EuroBasket 2017 |
| 04/09/2017 | Croatia | 72–76 | Cluj-Napoca | 2,000 | EuroBasket 2017 |
| 05/09/2017 | Czech Republic | 88–75 | Cluj-Napoca | 2,500 | EuroBasket 2017 |
| 07/09/2017 | Romania | 86–69 | Cluj-Napoca | 3,500 | EuroBasket 2017 |
| 10/09/2017 | Latvia | 68–100 | Istanbul | 1,000 | EuroBasket 2017 |
| 24/11/2017 | Spain | 66–79 | Podgorica | 3,600 | World Cup 2019 qualifiers |
| 26/11/2017 | Belarus | 91–67 | Minsk | 2,000 | World Cup 2019 qualifiers |
| 23/02/2018 | Slovenia | 63–75 | Podgorica | 3,000 | World Cup 2019 qualifiers |
| 26/02/2018 | Spain | 67–79 | Zaragoza | 8,600 | World Cup 2019 qualifiers |
| 28/06/2018 | Belarus | 80–69 | Nikšić | 2,000 | World Cup 2019 qualifiers |
| 01/07/2018 | Slovenia | 87–74 | Ljubljana | 5,000 | World Cup 2019 qualifiers |
| 14/09/2018 | Turkey | 69–79 | Ankara | 10,000 | World Cup 2019 qualifiers |
| 17/09/2018 | Ukraine | 90–84 | Nikšić | 3,000 | World Cup 2019 qualifiers |
| 29/11/2018 | Latvia | 84–75 | Riga | 7,500 | World Cup 2019 qualifiers |
| 02/11/2018 | Turkey | 71–66 | Podgorica | 3,500 | World Cup 2019 qualifiers |
| 22/02/2019 | Ukraine | 76–74 | Kyiv | 6,500 | World Cup 2019 qualifiers |
| 25/02/2019 | Latvia | 74–80 | Podgorica | 5,500 | World Cup 2019 qualifiers |
| 29/05/2019 | Cyprus | 99–56 | Bar | 1,200 | Games of the Small States 2019 |
| 30/05/2019 | Iceland | 92–86 | Bar | 700 | Games of the Small States 2019 |
| 31/05/2019 | Malta | 97–84 | Bar | 500 | Games of the Small States 2019 |
| 01/06/2019 | Luxembourg | 93–91 | Bar | 1,000 | Games of the Small States 2019 |
| 01/09/2019 | Greece | 60–85 | Nanjing | 11,400 | World Cup 2019 |
| 03/09/2019 | New Zealand | 83–93 | Nanjing | 3,308 | World Cup 2019 |
| 05/09/2019 | Brazil | 73–84 | Nanjing | 5,000 | World Cup 2019 |
| 07/09/2019 | Turkey | 74–79 | Dongguan | 2,500 | World Cup 2019 |
| 09/09/2019 | Japan | 80–65 | Dongguan | 3,000 | World Cup 2019 |
| 21/02/2020 | (United Kingdom) Great Britain | 81–74 | Podgorica | 5,000 | EuroBasket 2022 qualifiers |
| 24/02/2020 | France | 66–85 | La Roche-sur-Yon | 3,000 | EuroBasket 2022 qualifiers |
| 27/11/2020 | Germany | 80-74 | Pau | 0 | EuroBasket 2022 qualifiers |
| 29/11/2020 | (United Kingdom) Great Britain | 59-74 | Pau | 0 | EuroBasket 2022 qualifiers |

== Montenegro vs. other countries ==
Below is the list of performances of Montenegro national basketball team against every single opponent.

| Opponents' country | G | W | L | PD |
|---|---|---|---|---|
| Albania | 2 | 2 | 0 | +78 |
| Andorra | 2 | 2 | 0 | +61 |
| Austria | 2 | 2 | 0 | +46 |
| Belarus | 2 | 2 | 0 | +35 |
| Bosnia and Herzegovina | 2 | 0 | 2 | -14 |
| Brazil | 1 | 0 | 1 | -11 |
| Bulgaria | 2 | 2 | 0 | +17 |
| Croatia | 2 | 0 | 2 | -10 |
| Cyprus | 2 | 1 | 1 | +33 |
| Czech Republic | 1 | 1 | 0 | +13 |
| Denmark | 2 | 2 | 0 | +52 |
| Estonia | 2 | 2 | 0 | +22 |
| Finland | 3 | 2 | 1 | +28 |
| France | 1 | 0 | 1 | -19 |
| Georgia | 2 | 1 | 1 | -4 |
| Germany | 1 | 1 | 0 | +6 |
| Great Britain | 2 | 1 | 1 | -8 |
| Greece | 2 | 0 | 2 | -41 |
| Hungary | 1 | 1 | 0 | +24 |
| Iceland | 7 | 7 | 0 | +134 |
| Israel | 6 | 4 | 2 | +8 |
| Italy | 2 | 1 | 1 | +8 |
| Japan | 1 | 1 | 0 | +15 |
| Latvia | 6 | 3 | 3 | +6 |
| Lithuania | 1 | 0 | 1 | -7 |
| Luxembourg | 3 | 3 | 0 | +51 |
| Macedonia | 2 | 2 | 0 | +6 |
| Malta | 1 | 1 | 0 | +13 |
| Netherlands | 4 | 2 | 2 | +14 |
| New Zealand | 1 | 0 | 1 | -10 |
| Romania | 1 | 1 | 0 | +17 |
| San Marino | 1 | 1 | 0 | +63 |
| Serbia | 3 | 3 | 0 | +19 |
| Slovakia | 4 | 4 | 0 | +114 |
| Slovenia | 2 | 1 | 1 | +1 |
| Spain | 3 | 0 | 3 | -64 |
| Sweden | 2 | 2 | 0 | +37 |
| Turkey | 3 | 1 | 2 | -10 |
| Ukraine | 2 | 2 | 0 | +8 |
| OVERALL | 87 | 60 | 27 | +759 |

Last update: 28 February 2020

== See also ==
- Montenegro national basketball team
- Sport in Montenegro
- Montenegrin Basketball League
- Montenegro women's national basketball team
