= Basketball at the 2013 Games of the Small States of Europe =

Games of the Small States of Europe Basketball Tournament
- Luxembourg City 2013

Tournament details
- Games: 2013 Games of the Small States of Europe
- Host nation: Luxembourg
- City: Luxembourg City
- Venue: D'Coque
- Duration: 28 May – 1 June 2013

Men's tournament
- Teams: 5
Medals
Gold medalists	Cyprus
Silver medalists	Luxembourg
Bronze medalists	Iceland

Women's tournament
- Teams: 4
Medals
Gold medalists	Luxembourg
Silver medalists	Iceland
Bronze medalists	Cyprus

Official website
- www.luxembourg2013.lu/actu1_en.htm

Tournaments
← 2009	2015 →

Basketball at the 2013 Games of the Small States of Europe was held at D'Coque in Luxembourg, from 28 May to 1 June 2013.

== Medal summary ==
=== Medal table ===
* Host nation (Luxembourg)

Rank	Nation	Gold	Silver	Bronze	Total
1	Luxembourg*	1	1	0	2
2	Cyprus	1	0	1	2
3	Iceland	0	1	1	2
Totals (3 entries)		2	2	2	6

Event	Gold	Silver	Bronze
Men	Cyprus	Luxembourg	Iceland
Women	Luxembourg	Iceland	Cyprus

== Men's tournament ==
=== Table ===
Team	Pld	W	L	PF	PA	PD	Pts
Cyprus	4	4	0	322	224	+98	8
Luxembourg	4	3	1	328	251	+77	7
Iceland	4	2	2	279	289	−10	6
Andorra	4	1	3	287	284	+3	5
San Marino	4	0	4	185	353	−168	4

=== Results ===
28 May 2013
16:00

Boxscore

Iceland	94–53	San Marino
Scoring by quarter: 20–17, 23–8, 32–9, 19–19
Pts: Steinarsson 27; Rebs: Nathanaelsson 12; Asts: Björnsson, Shouse 2		Pts: Ugolini 10; Rebs: Zanotti 7 Asts: Venturini, Casadei 2

D'Coque, Luxembourg
Attendance: 12
Referees: Shane Bassett, Tomas Trawicky, Pascale Weiwers

28 May 2013
20:30

Boxscore

Andorra	74–82	Luxembourg
Scoring by quarter: 17–24, 8–22, 21–10, 28–26
Pts: Marín 26; Rebs: Casals 11; Asts: Galera 3		Pts: Schumacher 22; Rebs: McDaniel, Smith 8 Asts: Rajniak 4

D'Coque, Luxembourg
Attendance: 800
Referees: Joseph Bissang, Vincent Delestree, Rune Larsen

29 May 2013
18:15

Boxscore

Cyprus	79–61	Andorra
Scoring by quarter: 22–15, 21–15, 17–17, 19–14
Pts: Panteli, Stylianou 13; Rebs: King 11; Asts: King, Palalas 3		Pts: Gabriel 16; Rebs: Marín 9 Asts: three players 2

D'Coque, Luxembourg
Attendance: 400
Referees: Joseph Bissang, Patrick Glod, Sigmundur Herbertsson

29 May 2013
20:30

Boxscore

Luxembourg	88–61	Iceland
Scoring by quarter: 20–25, 16–10, 24–19, 28–7
Pts: Smith 20; Rebs: McDaniel 12; Asts: Birenbaum 4		Pts: Björnsson 18; Rebs: Nathanaelsson 7 Asts: four players 1

D'Coque, Luxembourg
Attendance: 2,200
Referees: Sergio Silva, Johann Jeanneau, Gian Luigi Gianchecchi

30 May 2013
16:00

Boxscore

San Marino	44–83	Cyprus
Scoring by quarter: 9–30, 14–11, 11–25, 10–17
Pts: three players 8 Rebs: Zanotti 6 Asts: Liberti, Casadei 2		Pts: Trisokkas 22; Rebs: Stylianou 8 Asts: Razis, Pantouris 3

D'Coque, Luxembourg
Attendance: 150
Referees: Vincent Delestree, Marc Mouton, Pascale Weiwers

30 May 2013
20:30

Boxscore

Iceland	72–67	Andorra
Scoring by quarter: 18–24, 15–13, 21–11, 18–19
Pts: Steinarsson 17; Rebs: Nathanaelsson 8 Asts: Björnsson 4		Pts: Galera 19; Rebs: Gabriel 12; Asts: Galera 5

D'Coque, Luxembourg
Attendance: 106
Referees: Sergio Silva, Patrick Glod, Gian Luigi Gianchecchi

31 May 2013
18:15

Boxscore

Cyprus	81–52	Iceland
Scoring by quarter: 14–9, 20–9, 29–17, 18–17
Pts: Pantouris 15; Rebs: five players 6 Asts: Palalas 4		Pts: Björnsson 17; Rebs: Nathanaelsson 9 Asts: Gunnarsson 3

D'Coque, Luxembourg
Attendance: 500
Referees: Johann Jeannau, Tomasz Trawicky, Patrick Glod

31 May 2013
20:30

Boxscore

San Marino	37–91	Luxembourg
Scoring by quarter: 10–28, 6–20, 9–21, 12–22
Pts: Zanotti 10; Rebs: Zanotti 7 Asts: Casadei 3		Pts: Smith 16; Rebs: McDaniel 13; Asts: Jones 5

D'Coque, Luxembourg
Attendance: 2,000
Referees: Shane Bassett, Sigmundur Herbertsson, Rune Larsen

1 June 2013
11:15

Boxscore

Andorra	85–51	San Marino
Scoring by quarter: 18–11, 23–13, 21–17, 23–10
Pts: Gabriel 20; Rebs: Gabriel 10; Asts: Casals 5		Pts: Zanotti 16; Rebs: Zanotti 8 Asts: Zanotti, Casadei 2

D'Coque, Luxembourg
Attendance: 174
Referees: Sigmundur Herbertsson, Vincent Delestree, Marc Mouton

1 June 2013
16:15

Boxscore

Luxembourg	67–79	Cyprus
Scoring by quarter: 14–19, 21–18, 13–16, 19–26
Pts: McDaniel 19; Rebs: McDaniel 8 Asts: three players 2		Pts: King 23; Rebs: King 9 Asts: Palalas 5

D'Coque, Luxembourg
Attendance: 3,145
Referees: Joseph Bissang, Shane Bassett, Tomasz Trawicki

== Women's tournament ==
=== Table ===
Team	Pld	W	L	PF	PA	PD	Pts
Luxembourg	3	3	0	181	156	+25	6
Iceland	3	2	1	206	170	+36	5
Cyprus	3	1	2	155	184	−29	4
Malta	3	0	3	157	189	−32	3

=== Results ===
28 May 2013
18:15

Boxscore

Cyprus	48–65	Luxembourg
Scoring by quarter: 15–15, 5–15, 13–19, 15–16
Pts: K. Papadopoulou 13; Rebs: K. Papadopoulou 6 Asts: Makri 3		Pts: Fisher 13; Rebs: Mossong, Haentges 7 Asts: Schmit, Fisher 7

D'Coque, Luxembourg
Attendance: 1,000
Referees: Sergio Silva, Sigmundur Herbertsson, Gian Luigi Gianchecchi

29 May 2013
16:00

Boxscore

Malta	59–77	Iceland
Scoring by quarter: 15–19, 13–22, 17–23, 14–13
Pts: Thomas 21; Rebs: Thomas 13; Asts: Grima 3		Pts: Sverrisdóttir 28; Rebs: Sverrisdóttir 14; Asts: Sverrisdóttir 2

D'Coque, Luxembourg
Attendance: 53
Referees: Shane Basset, Vincent Delstree, Marc Mouton

30 May 2013
18:15

Boxscore

Luxembourg	54–49	Malta
Scoring by quarter: 17–13, 8–15, 13–13, 16–8
Pts: Mossong 21; Rebs: Fisher 10; Asts: Schmit 3		Pts: Vella, Demartino 13; Rebs: Demartino 11; Asts: Brincat 3

D'Coque, Luxembourg
Attendance: 1,112
Referees: Johann Jeanneau, Tomasz Trawicky, Rune Larsen

31 May 2013
16:00

Boxscore

Cyprus	49–70	Iceland
Scoring by quarter: 9–19, 14–14, 18–16, 8–18
Pts: K. Papadopoulou 19; Rebs: Theologou 7 Asts: Makri 4		Pts: Sverrisdóttir 16; Rebs: Sverrisdóttir 12; Asts: Sigurjónsdóttir 3

D'Coque, Luxembourg
Attendance: 200
Referees: Joseph Bissang, Pascale Weiwers, Marc Mouton

1 June 2013
09:00

Boxscore

Malta	49–58	Cyprus
Scoring by quarter: 11–12, 9–15, 16–16, 13–15
Pts: J. Grima 13; Rebs: J. Grima 11; Asts: C. Grima 4		Pts: K. Papadopoulou 24; Rebs: Theologou 14; Asts: 3 players 2

D'Coque, Luxembourg
Attendance: 200
Referees: Sergio Silva, Patrick Glod, Pascale Weiwers

1 June 2013
14:00

Boxscore

Iceland	59–62	Luxembourg
Scoring by quarter: 20–14, 15–21, 12–13, 12–14
Pts: Sverrisdóttir 17; Rebs: Sverrisdóttir 16; Asts: Sverrisdóttir 3		Pts: Fisher 14; Rebs: Hetting, Fisher 9 Asts: Schmit 4

D'Coque, Luxembourg
Attendance: 2,000
Referees: Johann Jeanneau, Gian Luigi Gianchecchi, Rune Larsen
