= László Németh (basketball) =

Hungarian basketball player and coach (born 1951)

Personal information
- Born: October 25, 1951 (age 75) Budapest, Hungary
- Coaching career: 1978–2006

Career history

Coaching
- 1978–1984: Csepel SC
- 1984–1988: Al-Qadsia
- 1986–1988: Kuwait
- 1988–1990: KR
- 1988–1990: Iceland
- 1990–1993: Al Ain
- 1993–1994: KR
- 1994–2004: England
- 2004–2006: Al-Ittihad
- 2006: KR-b

Career highlights
- As coach: Hungarian Basketball Cup (1984); Kuwait Coach of the year (1987); 3x Kuwait league champion (1985, 1986, 1987); 3x Kuwait Cup (1985, 1986, 1987); 2x Úrvalsdeild Coach of the year (1989, 1990); Icelandic league champion (1990); 2x Saudi Arabia league champion (2005, 2006); Alnokhbah Championship (2005); 2x Prince Faisal Cup (2005, 2006)

Career coaching record
- Úrvalsdeild karla: 54–24 (.692)
Medals
Head Coach for Iceland
men's national basketball team
Games of the Small States of Europe
Bronze medal – third place	1989 Cyprus	National Team
FIBA European Championship for Small Countries
Gold medal – first place	1988 Malta	National Team

Dr. László Németh (born October 25, 1951) is a Hungarian former professional basketball coach and player. He has coached the national teams of Iceland, England, and Kuwait.

== Playing career ==
=== Club career ===
Németh played with Honvéd Budapest. He retired in 1976 after recurring knee injuries.

=== National team career ===
Németh played 16 games with the Hungarian national basketball team between 1969 and 1976.

== Coaching career ==
=== KR ===
Németh coached KR men's team from 1988 to 1990, where he was the Úrvalsdeild karla coach of the year in 1989 and 1990. He led the team to the Icelandic championship in 1990.

He coached KR-b during part of its Icelandic Cup run in 2006.

=== Iceland ===
Németh coached the Icelandic men's national basketball team from 1988 to 1990, leading it to a 7-13 record and gold at the 1988 European Promotion Cup for Men.
