= 1990 European Promotion Cup for Men =

Tournament details
- Host country: Wales
- City: Cardiff
- Dates: 12–16 December 1990
- Teams: 8 (from 1 confederation)
- Venue(s): 1 (in 1 host city)

Final positions
- Champions: Iceland (2nd title)
- Runners-up: Cyprus
- Third place: Luxembourg

Official website
- www.fibaeurope.com

The 1990 European Promotion Cup for Men was the second edition of this tournament. It was hosted in Cardiff, Wales and Iceland won the tournament after beating Cyprus in the final game.

== Preliminary round ==
=== Group A ===
Pos	Team	Pld	W	L	PF	PA	PD	Pts	Qualification	(Republic of Ireland)	(Luxembourg)	(San Marino)	(Gibraltar)
1	Ireland	3	3	0	286	201	+85	6	Semifinals	—	95–85		112–39
2	Luxembourg	3	2	1	266	208	+58	5	Semifinals		—	91–55	
3	San Marino	3	1	2	198	230	−32	4	Classification games	77–79		—	66–60
4	Gibraltar	3	0	3	157	268	−111	3	Classification games		58–90		—

Source: FIBA Archive

=== Group B ===
Pos	Team	Pld	W	L	PF	PA	PD	Pts	Qualification	(Iceland)	(Cyprus)	(Malta)	(Wales)
1	Iceland	3	3	0	301	191	+110	6	Semifinals	—	95–79		92–48
2	Cyprus	3	2	1	276	236	+40	5	Semifinals		—	104–87	93–54
3	Malta	3	1	2	226	277	−51	4	Classification games	64–114		—	75–59
4	Wales (H)	3	0	3	161	260	−99	3	Classification games				—

Source: FIBA Archive
(H) Hosts

== Classification games ==
5th–8th place semifinals
Gibraltar	77
Malta	61
San Marino	56
Wales	53

5th place match
Gibraltar	81
San Marino	58
7th place match
Malta	69
Wales	64

== Final round ==
=== Bracket ===
Semifinals
Luxembourg	93
Iceland	98
Ireland	74
Cyprus	75

Final
Iceland	101
Cyprus	93
3rd place match
Luxembourg	75
Ireland	70

=== Final ===
16 December 1990
16:30

Boxscore

Iceland	101–93	Cyprus
Scoring by half: 49–42, 52–51

Cardiff, Wales
Referees: Erwin de Buck (BEL), Bart van de Graaf (NED)

== Final standings ==
Rank	Team	Record
1st place, gold medalist(s)	Iceland	5–0
2nd place, silver medalist(s)	Cyprus	3–2
3rd place, bronze medalist(s)	Luxembourg	3–2
4	Ireland	3–2
5	Gibraltar	2–3
6	San Marino	2–3
7	Malta	2–3
8	Wales	0–5
