= Monaco men's national basketball team =

Monaco
- FIBA ranking: NR (1 September 2026)
- Joined FIBA: 1987
- FIBA zone: FIBA Europe
- National federation: Fédération Monégasque de Basketball

Games of the Small States of Europe
- Appearances: 6
- Medals: (gold) Gold: (1987)

First international
- Cyprus 87–100 Monaco (Montecarlo, Monaco; 14 May 1987)

Biggest win
- Cyprus 87–100 Monaco (Montecarlo, Monaco; 14 May 1987)

Biggest defeat
- Monaco 40–108 Cyprus (Serravalle, San Marino; 1 June 2001)

The Monaco men's national basketball team (French: Équipe de Monaco de basketball) is the national basketball team of the Principality of Monaco. Monaco has competed at the Games of the Small States of Europe, and winning gold in 1987.

== Competitive record ==
Games of the Small States of Europe
Year	Position	Pld	W	L
(Monaco) 1987	1st place, gold medalist(s)	3	3	0
(Cyprus) 1989	6th	4	1	3
(Andorra) 1991	6th	3	0	3
(San Marino) 2001	4th	5	2	3
(Malta) 2003	6th	3	0	3
(Monaco) 2007	5th	5	0	5
Total		23	6	17
