= San Marino Basketball Federation =

- Sport: Basketball
- Jurisdiction: San Marino
- Abbreviation: FSP
- Founded: 1968; 58 years ago
- Affiliation: FIBA
- Regional affiliation: FIBA Europe
- CEO: Damiano Battistini

Official website
- www.fsp.sm
- (San Marino)

San Marino Basketball Federation (Italian: Federazione Sammarinese Pallacanestro) is the governing body of basketball in San Marino. It was founded in 1968. It organizes the internal league and runs the San Marino national basketball team.

The current president of the federation is Gian Primo Giardi.

== See also ==
- San Marino national basketball team
