= San Marino men's national basketball team =

San Marino
- FIBA ranking: 112 ▼2 (1 September 2026)
- Joined FIBA: 1968
- FIBA zone: FIBA Europe
- National federation: Federazione Sammarinese Pallacanestro
- Coach: Massimo Padovano

Championship for Small Countries
- Appearances: 19
- Medals: (gold) Gold: (2002); (silver) Silver: (2000); (bronze) Bronze: (1996, 1998, 2016)

Games of the Small States of Europe
- Appearances: 13
- Medals: (bronze) Bronze: (2001, 2007)
Home	Away

First international
- San Marino – Luxembourg (Monaco; 14 May 1987)

The San Marino national basketball team (Italian: Nazionale di pallacanestro di San Marino) is the national representative for San Marino in international basketball. They are controlled by the San Marino Basketball Federation (FSP).

The national team competes at lower tiered tournaments, being the European Championship for Small Countries, and the Games of the Small States of Europe.

== Competitive record ==
=== At the Championship for Small Countries ===
Championship for Small Countries
Year	Position	Pld	W	L
(Gibraltar) 1988	5th	5	3	2
(Wales) 1990	6th	5	2	3
(Cyprus) 1992	5th	5	3	2
(Republic of Ireland) 1994	Did not enter			
(San Marino) 1996	3rd place, bronze medalist(s)	5	3	2
(Gibraltar) 1998	3rd place, bronze medalist(s)	4	2	2
(Andorra) 2000	2nd place, silver medalist(s)	5	4	1
(Malta) 2002	1st place, gold medalist(s)	5	4	1
(Andorra) 2004	6th	4	1	3
(Albania) 2006	5th	5	3	2
(Scotland) 2008	5th	5	3	2
(Malta) 2010	8th	5	0	5
(San Marino) 2012	4th	5	2	3
(Gibraltar) 2014	4th	5	2	3
(Moldova) 2016	3rd place, bronze medalist(s)	5	3	2
(San Marino) 2018	6th	4	1	3
(Republic of Ireland) 2021	4th	4	1	3
(Malta) 2022	5th	4	2	2
(Andorra) 2024	3rd place, bronze medalist(s)	5	2	3
(Gibraltar) 2026	4th	5	0	5
Total		90	41	49

=== At the Games of the Small States of Europe ===
Games of the Small States of Europe
Year	Position	Pld	W	L
(Monaco) 1987	4th	4	1	2
(Cyprus) 1989	7th	3	1	2
(Andorra) 1991	7th	3	0	3
(Malta) 1993	5th	5	1	4
(Luxembourg) 1995	4th	4	1	3
(Iceland) 1997	5th	3	1	2
(San Marino) 2001	3rd place, bronze medalist(s)	4	2	2
(Malta) 2003	4th	5	2	3
(Andorra) 2005	4th	4	1	3
(Monaco) 2007	3rd place, bronze medalist(s)	5	2	3
(Cyprus) 2009	6th	5	0	5
(Luxembourg) 2013	5th	4	0	4
(San Marino) 2017	5th	5	0	5
(Montenegro) 2019	Did not enter			
Total		53	12	41

== Team ==
=== Current roster ===
Roster for the 2026 FIBA European Championship for Small Countries.

San Marino men's national basketball team roster
Players
Coaches

Pos.	No.	Name	Age – Date of birth	Height	Club	Ctr.
C	1	Ygor Biordi	30 – 17 January 1996	2.04 m (6 ft 8 in)	Siaz Basket	(Italy)
PG	2	Matteo Mularoni	22 – 27 July 2003	1.84 m (6 ft 0 in)	Basket Club Russi ASD	(Italy)
PF	3	Eugenio Falcioni	17 – 30 June 2008	1.90 m (6 ft 3 in)	ASD Pallacanestro Titano	(San Marino)
PG	4	Federico San Martini	18 – 3 February 2008	1.80 m (5 ft 11 in)	ASD Pallacanestro Titano	(San Marino)
PG	5	Nicola Borello	29 – 25 June 1997	1.80 m (5 ft 11 in)	Basket 2000 San Marino	(San Marino)
PG	6	Davide Macina	32 – 1 July 1993	1.76 m (5 ft 9 in)	ASD Pallacanestro Titano	(San Marino)
PF	8	Pietro Ugolini	25 – 5 November 2000	1.97 m (6 ft 6 in)	ASD Pallacanestro Titano	(San Marino)
C	9	Andrea Merlini	32 – 26 July 1993	1.89 m (6 ft 2 in)	Basket 2000 San Marino	(San Marino)
SF	10	Gioele Moretti	32 – 2 November 1993	1.90 m (6 ft 3 in)	AD Pallacanestro Stella Azzurra VT	(Italy)
SF	11	Mathias Cadiman	19 – 27 September 2006	1.96 m (6 ft 5 in)	Central Pointe Christian Academy	(United States)
G	12	Kevin Riccardi	28 – 22 March 1998	1.83 m (6 ft 0 in)	Basket 2000 San Marino	(San Marino)
C	14	Gianluca Tura	17 – 16 January 2009	1.93 m (6 ft 4 in)	Basket Santarcangelo SSDRL	(Italy)

Head coach

- (San Marino) Stefano Rossini

Assistant coach(es)

- (Italy) Sergio Del Bianco

Legend

- (C) Team captain
- Club – describes last
  club before the competition
- Age – describes age
  on 28 June 2026

== See also ==
- Sport in San Marino
