= Basketball at the 2001 Games of the Small States of Europe =

- Dates: 29 May-2 June

Basketball at the 2001 Games of the Small States of Europe was held from 29 May to 2 June 2001. Games were played in San Marino.

In this edition, there was not women's tournament.

== Medal summary ==
Event	Gold	Silver	Bronze
Men	Cyprus	Iceland	San Marino

== Men's tournament ==
Men's tournament was played by seven teams divided into two groups where the two first qualified teams would join the semifinals.

=== Preliminary round ===
==== Group A ====
Pos	Team	Pld	W	L	PF	PA	PD	Pts	Qualification	(Iceland)	(Monaco)	(Malta)	(Andorra)
1	Iceland	3	3	0	269	170	+99	6	Semifinals	—	91–54	98–52	80–64
2	Monaco	3	2	1	203	226	−23	5	Semifinals		—		
3	Malta	3	1	2	204	254	−50	4	5th position game		60–68	—	
4	Andorra (E)	3	0	3	227	253	−26	3			75–81	88–92	—

Source: FLBB
(E) Eliminated

==== Group B ====
Pos	Team	Pld	W	L	PF	PA	PD	Pts	Qualification	(Cyprus)	(San Marino)	(Luxembourg)
1	Cyprus	2	2	0	162	107	+55	4	Semifinals	—	81–57	81–50
2	San Marino (H)	2	1	1	147	165	−18	3	Semifinals		—	90–84
3	Luxembourg	2	0	2	134	171	−37	2	5th position game			—

Source: FLBB
(H) Hosts

=== Final round ===
Semifinals
Monaco	40
Cyprus	108
Iceland	107
San Marino	102

Final
Cyprus	79
Iceland	65
Third place
San Marino	81
Monaco	54

=== Fifth position game ===
Malta	72
Luxembourg	81
