= Basketball at the 2007 Games of the Small States of Europe =

- Venue: Salle Gaston Médecin
- Dates: 5-9 June

Basketball at the 2007 Games of the Small States of Europe was held from 5 to 9 June 2007. Games were played at the Salle Gaston Médecin, in Fontvieille, Monaco.

There was no women's competition.

== Medal summary ==
Event	Gold	Silver	Bronze
Men	Iceland	Luxembourg	San Marino

== Men's tournament ==
Men's tournament was played by a round-robin group composed by six teams.

=== Table ===
Pos	Team	Pld	W	L	PF	PA	PD	Pts	Qualification	(Iceland)	(Luxembourg)	(San Marino)	(Andorra)	(Monaco)	(Cyprus)
1	Iceland (C)	5	5	0	366	273	+93	10	Gold medal	—	92–62	92–81			72–78 (Note: Cyprus was disqualified due to a brawl with two minutes left, and the win was finally given to Iceland.)
2	Luxembourg	5	4	1	391	374	+17	9	Silver medal		—	81–70	88–60		
3	San Marino	5	2	3	393	430	−37	7	Bronze medal			—	107–105	64–57	71–95
4	Andorra	5	1	4	371	455	−84	6		75–94			—	85–69	
5	Monaco (H)	5	0	5	337	404	−67	5		69–74	62–87			—	77–95
6	Cyprus (D)	5	3	2	370	292	+78	8	Disqualified		83–86		97–56		—

Source: Monaco 2007 website
(C) Champions; (D) Disqualified; (H) Hosts

== Top scorers ==
1	(San Marino) Andrea Raschi	107
2	(Andorra) Xavi Galera	105
3	(Luxembourg) Larrie Smith	100
