= Basketball at the 2019 Games of the Small States of Europe =

- Venue: Topolica Sport Hall
- Location: (Montenegro) Bar
- Dates: 28 May – 1 June
- Nations: 6
- Teams: 5 (men); 6 (women)

Basketball at the 2019 Games of the Small States of Europe was held from 28 May to 1 June 2019 in Bar.

== Medal summary ==
Event	Gold	Silver	Bronze
Men	Montenegro; Filip Bakić; Igor Drobnjak; Pavle Đurišić; Emir Hadžibegović; Marko Mugoša; Vukota Pavić; Nikola Pavličević; Miloš Popović; Sead Šehović; Marko Simonović; Radosav Spasojević; Nikola Žižić	Luxembourg; Ivan do Rosario Delgado; Xavier François; Thomas Grün; Philippe Gutenkauf; Joe Kalmes; Alex Laurent; Bob Melcher; Kevin Moura Santos; Clancy Mac Rugg; Max Schmit; Oliver Vujakovic; Yann Wolff	Iceland; Breki Gylfason; Dagur Kár Jónsson; Elvar Már Friðriksson; Gunnar Ólafsson; Halldór Garðar Hermannsson; Hilmar Smári Henningsson; Hjálmar Stefánsson; Kristinn Pálsson; Ólafur Ólafsson; Ragnar Nathanaelsson; Sigurður Þorsteinsson; Þórir Þorbjarnarson
Women	Montenegro; Snežana Aleksić; Andjela Bigović; Milena Jakšić; Bojana Kovačević; Violeta Lazarević; Marija Leković; Amina Marković; Kristina Raković; Teodora Sarić; Jelena Vučetić; Sofija Živaljević; Dragana Živković	Iceland; Berglind Gunnarsdóttir; Bryndís Guðmundsdóttir; Embla Kristínardóttir; Gunnhildur Gunnarsdóttir; Hallveig Jónsdóttir; Helena Sverrisdóttir; Hildur Björg Kjartansdóttir; Sara Rún Hinriksdóttir; Sigrún Björg Ólafsdóttir; Thelma Dís Ágústsdóttir; Þóra Kristín Jónsdóttir; Þóranna Kika Hodge-Carr	Luxembourg; Laure Diederich; Mandy Geniets; Tessy Hetting; Lynn Kauffmann; Magaly Sonja Meynadier; Nadia Mossong; Estelle Marie Muller; Julie Nilles; Michèle Orban; Cathy Schmit; Julija Vujakovic; Bridget Marie Yoerger

== Men's tournament ==
Five teams joined the tournament. After their victory in the 2018 FIBA European Championship for Small Countries, Malta competed in the Games for the first time since 2009. Andorra did not participate for the second time; this being their first absence since 1987; and San Marino did not enter after coming last in the previous edition, as host team.

=== Standings ===
Pos	Team	Pld	W	L	PF	PA	PD	Pts	Medals	(Montenegro)	(Luxembourg)	(Iceland)	(Malta)	(Cyprus)
1	Montenegro (H, C)	4	4	0	381	317	+64	8	Gold medal	—	—	—	—	99–56
2	Luxembourg	4	3	1	357	330	+27	7	Silver medal	91–93	—	—	—	—
3	Iceland	4	2	2	319	298	+21	6	Bronze medal	86–92	67–77	—	80–75	—
4	Malta	4	1	3	332	352	−20	5		84–97	79–94	—	—	93–81
5	Cyprus	4	0	4	281	373	−92	4		—	91–95	53–86	—	—

Source: Montenegro 2019
(C) Champions; (H) Hosts

=== Results ===
All times are local (UTC+2).

28 May 2019	Iceland	67–77	Luxembourg	Bar
13:15	Scoring by quarter: 25–13, 14–21, 17–21, 11–22
	Pts: Friðriksson 16	Boxscore	Pts: Rugg 21	Arena: Topolica

28 May 2019	Malta	93–81	Cyprus	Bar
17:45	Scoring by quarter: 27–14, 16–20, 19–17, 31–30
	Pts: A. Falzon, T. Falzon 27	Boxscore	Pts: Biggs 19	Arena: Topolica

29 May 2019	Iceland	80–75(OT)	Malta	Bar
15:30	Scoring by quarter: 22–14, 12–7, 15–17, 15–26, Overtime: 16–11
	Pts: Friðriksson 33	Boxscore	Pts: A. Falzon 33	Arena: Topolica

29 May 2019	Montenegro	99–56	Cyprus	Bar
20:00	Scoring by quarter: 31–23, 30–24, 15–9, 23–10
	Pts: Pavličević 33	Boxscore	Pts: Michail, Stylianou 12	Arena: Topolica

30 May 2019	Malta	79–94	Luxembourg	Bar
15:30	Scoring by quarter: 11–25, 19–20, 28–26, 21–23
	Pts: A. Falzon 19	Boxscore	Pts: Grün 17	Arena: Topolica

30 May 2019	Iceland	86–92	Montenegro	Bar
20:00	Scoring by quarter: 18–25, 29–15, 19–32, 20–20
	Pts: Friðriksson 29	Boxscore	Pts: Popović 36	Arena: Topolica

31 May 2019	Cyprus	91–95(OT)	Luxembourg	Bar
13:15	Scoring by quarter: 21–15, 17–26, 26–24, 22–21, Overtime: 5–9
	Pts: Sizopoulos, Stylianou 23	Boxscore	Pts: Rugg 25	Arena: Topolica

31 May 2019	Malta	84–97	Montenegro	Bar
20:00	Scoring by quarter: 21–23, 16–27, 26–22, 21–25
	Pts: T. Falzon 23	Boxscore	Pts: Hadžibegović 28	Arena: Topolica

1 June 2019	Cyprus	53–86	Iceland	Bar
10:45	Scoring by quarter: 8–26, 14–19, 18–15, 13–26
	Pts: Sizopoulos 14	Boxscore	Pts: Pálsson 19	Arena: Topolica

1 June 2019	Luxembourg	91–93	Montenegro	Bar
17:30	Scoring by quarter: 21–18, 24–20, 25–33, 21–22
	Pts: Melcher 27	Boxscore	Pts: Drobnjak 22	Arena: Topolica

== Women's basketball ==
Pos	Team	Pld	W	L	PF	PA	PD	Pts	Medals	(Montenegro)	(Iceland)	(Luxembourg)	(Malta)	(Monaco)	(Cyprus)
1	Montenegro (H, C)	5	5	0	371	247	+124	10	Gold medal	—	—	68–49	—	56–46	—
2	Iceland	5	4	1	381	285	+96	9	Silver medal	73–81	—	76–48	61–35	—	—
3	Luxembourg	5	3	2	329	306	+23	8	Bronze medal	—	—	—	76–58	80–67	76–37
4	Malta	5	2	3	280	324	−44	7		40–86	—	—	—	—	—
5	Monaco	5	1	4	306	352	−46	6		—	59–91	—	52–72	—	82–53
6	Cyprus	5	0	5	240	393	−153	5		39–80	62–80	—	49–75	—	—

Source: Montenegro 2019
(C) Champions; (H) Hosts
