= Hilmar Smári Henningsson =

Icelandic basketball player

Stjarnan
- Position: Shooting guard
- League: Úrvalsdeild karla

Personal information
- Born: 3 September 2000 (age 26)
- Listed height: 196 cm (6 ft 5 in)

Career information
- Playing career: 2016–present

Career history
- 2016–2017: Haukar
- 2017–2018: Þór Akureyri
- 2018–2019: Haukar
- 2019–2021: Valencia Basket
- 2019–2021: →Valencia Basket B
- 2021–2022: Stjarnan
- 2022–2023: Haukar
- 2023–2024: Eisbären Bremerhaven
- 2024–2025: Stjarnan
- 2025–2026: Jonava Hipocredit
- 2026–present: Stjarnan

Career highlights
- Icelandic champion (2025); Icelandic Cup (2022); Úrvalsdeild Domestic Team of the Year (2025); Úrvalsdeild Young Player of the Year (2019)
Medals
Men's basketball
Representing Iceland
Games of the Small States of Europe
Bronze medal – third place	2019 Montenegro	National Team

Hilmar Smári Henningsson (born 3 September 2000) is an Icelandic basketball player who recently played for Jonava Hipocredit of the Lithuanian Basketball League (LKL) and the Icelandic national basketball team. In 2019, he was named the Úrvalsdeild Young Player of the Year and in 2022, he won the Icelandic Cup with Stjarnan.

== Club career ==
Hilmar Smári started his senior team career with Haukar, appearing in 7 games during the 2016–17 Úrvalsdeild karla season. After starting the following season with Haukar, he moved to Þór Akureyri in December 2017. In 12 games with Þór, he averaged 12.2 points and 4.0 rebounds.

He returned to Haukar for the 2018–19 season and went on to average 14.0 points, 4.2 rebounds and 3.4 assists per game. After the season he was named the Úrvalsdeild Young Player of the Year.

In April 2019, Hilmar Smári had a tryout with Valencia Basket of the Liga ACB. Two months later he signed a 2-year contract with the team.

On 21 July 2021, Hilmar signed with Úrvalsdeild karla club Stjarnan. On 19 March 2022, he won his first Icelandic Basketball Cup when Stjarnan defeated reigning national champions Þór Þorlákshöfn in the 2022 Cup Finals. For the season, he averaged 12.4 points, 4.7 rebounds and 3.6 assists per game with the Stjarnan finishing 6th in the league and losing to Valur in the first round of the playoffs.

Following Haukar promotion back to the Úrvalsdeild, Hilmar signed with his hometown club in May 2022. He helped Haukar finish with the third best record in the league, with 14 victories in 22 games, while averaging 18.0 points, 5.2 rebounds and 4.2 assists per game. During Haukar's first round loss against Þór Þorlákshöfn, Hilmar averaged team highs 25.2 points and 6.4 assists along with 4.4 rebounds per game.

In July 2023, Hilmar Smári signed with Eisbären Bremerhaven of the German ProA.

In July 2024, Hilmar returned to Iceland and signed with Stjarnan. On 21 May 2025, he won the national championship with Stjarnan.

On September 5, 2025, he joined Jonava Hipocredit of the Lithuanian Basketball league (LKL). He left the club in January 2026. On 9 January, he signed back with Stjarnan.

== National team career ==
Hilmar Smári played his first games for the Icelandic national team during the 2019 Games of the Small States of Europe where Iceland finished third.

== Personal life ==
Hilmar's father is Henning Henningson, who played 30 games for the Icelandic national team from 1985 to 1993. His sister is basketball player Lovísa Henningsdóttir.

== Career statistics ==
=== National team ===
Team	Tournament	Pos.	GP	PPG	RPG	APG
Iceland	EuroBasket 2025	22nd	5	4.4	1.4	0.6

== Awards, titles and accomplishments ==
=== Individual awards ===
- Úrvalsdeild Young Player of the Year: 2019
