= Kristinn Pálsson =

Icelandic basketball player

General Contractor Jesi
- Position: Guard
- League: Serie B Basket

Personal information
- Born: 17 December 1997 (age 28)
- Listed height: 198 cm (6 ft 6 in)

Career information
- College: Marist (2015–2017)
- Playing career: 2011–present

Career history
- 2011–2012: Njarðvík-b
- 2018–2020: Njarðvík
- 2020–2022: Grindavík
- 2022–2023: Aris Leeuwarden
- 2023–2025: Valur
- 2025–present: General Contractor Jesi

Career highlights
- Úrvalsdeild Domestic Player of the Year (2024); 2x Úrvalsdeild Domestic All-First team (2024, 2025); Úrvalsdeild karla champion (2024); 2× Icelandic Basketball Cup (2025); Icelandic Super Cup (2023)

Kristinn Pálsson (born 17 December 1997) is an Icelandic basketball player and a member of the Icelandic national team.

== Basketball career ==
=== Early career ===
Kristinn started playing basketball with the junior teams of Njarðvík at the age of 6. He played his first senior games with its reserve team in the Icelandic Cup during the 2011–12 and 2012–13 seasons. During the summer of 2013, he signed with A.S. Stella Azzurra, amateur basketball club in Rome, to play for its junior team program.

=== College career ===
After two seasons with Stella Azzurra, Kristinn joined Marist College in 2015. During his freshman season, he averaged 8.7 points and 4.4 rebounds. In December 2017, during his junior season, he announced that he was leaving the school due to a death in his family.

=== Return to Iceland ===
In January 2018, Kristinn returned to Iceland and intended to join his hometown team of Njarðvík. However, after three games FIBA revoked his playing license as Stella Azzurra was demanding compensation due to him being a member of their team when he turned 18-years old. Although he played for Njarðvík's juniors teams from the age of 6 to 16, FIBA agreed with Azzurra and Njarðvík was forced to pay a 9,600 euros in compensation.

In May 2020, Kristinn signed with Grindavík. On 29 April 2021, he scored a game winning three pointer at the buzzer against ÍR. For the season, he averaged 12.2 points, 6.4 rebounds and 3.1 assists.

=== Netherlands ===
On 24 June 2022, Kristinn signed with Dutch club Aris Leeuwarden of the BNXT League.

=== Return to Iceland ===
On 24 August 2023, Kristinn signed with Valur. On 24 September 2023, he won the Icelandic Super Cup after Valur defeated Tindastóll 80–72.

On 22 March 2025, he won the Icelandic Cup after Valur defeated KR in the Cup finals, 96–78.

In July 2025, he signed with General Contractor Jesi of the Italian Serie B Basket.

== National team career ==
Kristinn debuted with the Icelandic national team in 2017.

== Career statistics ==
=== National team ===
Team	Tournament	Pos.	GP	PPG	RPG	APG
Iceland	EuroBasket 2025	22nd	5	7.4	3.4	1.0

== Personal life ==
Kristinn's father is former national team player Páll Kristinsson.
