= Basketball at the 1987 Games of the Small States of Europe =

- Venue: Salle Gaston Médecin

Basketball at the 1987 Games of the Small States of Europe was held in the Salle Gaston Médecin of Monaco.

== Medal summary ==
Event	Gold	Silver	Bronze
Men	Iceland	Monaco	Malta

== Men's tournament ==
Men's tournament was played by six teams initially divided into two groups of three teams. The two group winners qualified for the final while the two runners-up would play for the bronze medal.

=== Preliminary round ===
==== Group A ====
Pos	Team	Pld	W	L	PF	PA	PD	Pts	Qualification	(Monaco)	(Malta)	(Cyprus)
1	Monaco (H)	2	2	0	187	170	+17	4	Final	—	87–83	
2	Malta	2	1	1	160	158	+2	3	Bronze medal game		—	77–71
3	Cyprus	2	0	2	158	177	−19	2	5th position game	87–100		—

(H) Hosts

==== Group B ====
Pos	Team	Pld	W	L	PF	PA	PD	Pts	Qualification	(Iceland)	(San Marino)	(Luxembourg)
1	Iceland	2	2	0	163	123	+40	4	Final	—		73–54
2	San Marino	2	1	1	69	90	−21	3	Bronze medal game	69–90	—	W
3	Luxembourg	2	0	2	54	73	−19	2	5th position game			—

=== Classification games ===
==== 5th position game ====
Luxembourg	72–87	Cyprus

==== Bronze medal game ====
Malta	91–75	San Marino

==== Final ====
Monaco	80–75	Iceland

== References and external links ==
- Results at the Cypriot Basketball Federation
- Malta basketball team at the GSSE
- Iceland national basketball team results
