= Basketball at the 1997 Games of the Small States of Europe =

- Dates: 2-7 June

Basketball at the 1997 Games of the Small States of Europe was held from 2 to 7 June 1997 in Iceland. Cyprus won the gold medal in the men's event and the Iceland in the women's event.

== Medal summary ==
Event	Gold	Silver	Bronze
Men	Cyprus	Malta	Iceland
Women	Iceland	Luxembourg	Malta

== Men's tournament ==
=== Group A or B ===
Pos	Team	Pld	W	L	PF	PA	PD	Pts	Qualification	(Iceland)	(Luxembourg)	(Andorra)
1	Iceland (H)	2	2	0	197	151	+46	4	Semifinals	—	80–74	117–77
2	Luxembourg	2	1	1	74	80	−6	3	Semifinals		—	W
3	Andorra	2	0	2	77	117	−40	2				—

(H) Hosts

=== Group A or B ===
Pos	Team	Pld	W	L	PF	PA	PD	Pts	Qualification	(Malta)	(Cyprus)	(San Marino)
1	Malta	2	2	0	144	123	+21	4	Semifinals	—	75–56	69–67
2	Cyprus	2	1	1	123	140	−17	3	Semifinals		—	
3	San Marino	2	0	2	132	136	−4	2			65–67	—

=== Final bracket ===
Semifinals
Iceland	64
Cyprus	79
Malta	92
Luxembourg	83

Final
Cyprus	73
Malta	68
Third place
Iceland	99
Luxembourg	73

=== 5th position game ===
San Marino	–	Andorra

== Women's tournament ==
Pos	Team	Pld	W	L	PF	PA	PD	Pts	Qualification	(Iceland)	(Luxembourg)	(Malta)	(Cyprus)
1	Iceland (H, C)	3	3	0	199	145	+54	6	Gold medal	—	56–51	73–42	70–52
2	Luxembourg	0	0	0	0	0	0	0	Silver medal		—	71–26	
3	Malta	3	1	2	127	198	−71	4	Bronze medal			—	59–54
4	Cyprus	0	0	0	0	0	0	0			?		—

(C) Champions; (H) Hosts

== References and external links ==
- Results at the Cypriot Basketball Federation
- Malta basketball team at the GSSE
- Iceland national basketball team results
