= Iceland men's national basketball team =

Iceland
- FIBA ranking: 45 ▼1 (1 September 2026)
- Joined FIBA: 1959
- FIBA zone: FIBA Europe
- National federation: KKÍ
- Coach: Craig Pedersen
- Nickname: Strákarnir okkar (Our Boys)

FIBA World Cup
- Appearances: None

EuroBasket
- Appearances: 3
- Medals: None

Championship for Small Countries
- Appearances: 3
- Medals: (gold) Gold: (1988, 1990); (bronze) Bronze: (1994)

Games of the Small States of Europe
- Appearances: 14
- Medals: (gold) Gold: (1991, 1993, 2007); (silver) Silver: (1987, 2001, 2003, 2005, 2015); (bronze) Bronze: (1989, 1995, 1997, 2013, 2017, 2019)
Home	Away

First international
- Denmark 38–41 Iceland (Copenhagen, Denmark; 16 May 1959)

Biggest win
- Iceland 123–59 Norway (Reykjavík, Iceland; 15 April 1968)

Biggest defeat
- Iceland 51–124 Croatia (Murcia, Spain; 24 June 1992)

The Iceland men's national basketball team (Icelandic: Íslenska karlalandsliðið í körfubolta) represents Iceland in international basketball tournaments. The team is controlled by the Icelandic Basketball Association.

Iceland has qualified for the EuroBasket three times in their history, with the national team making their first appearance in 2015. They have also participated at smaller European tournaments, such as the Games of the Small States of Europe.

== Recent history ==
=== EuroBasket 2015 ===
On 28 August 2014, Iceland qualified for the EuroBasket 2015, entering the finals of the top European competition for the first time in its history. The national team though didn't fare too well in their maiden voyage at the EuroBasket. Finishing (0-5) in their Group B pool, played in Berlin with defeats at the hands of Germany, Italy, Serbia, Spain, and Turkey. Overall it was a memorable moment for Iceland, where they finally achieved the feat of competing at a major international tournament, after numerous failed qualifications in the past.

=== EuroBasket 2017 ===
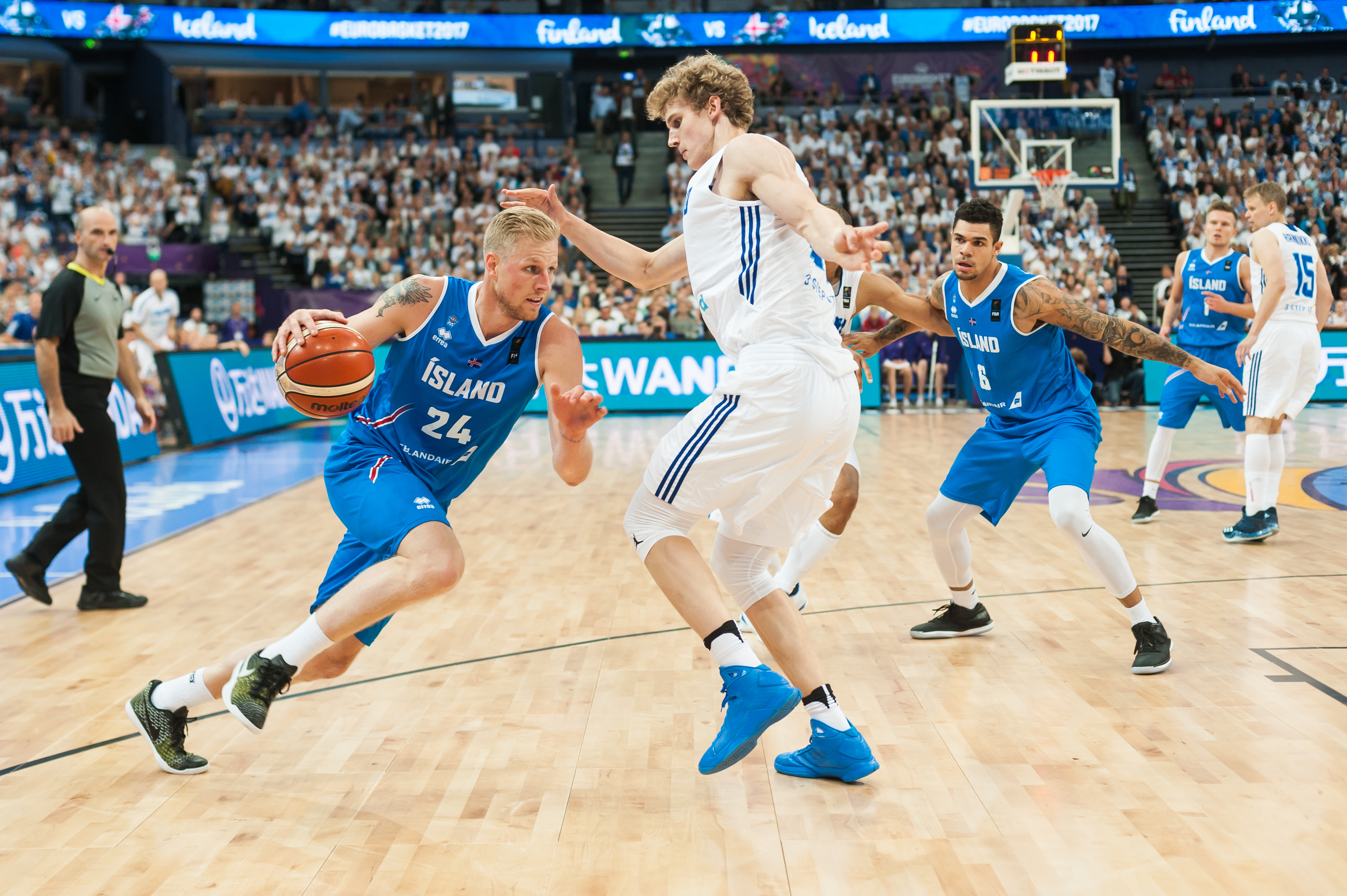
EuroBasket 2017 match between Finland and Iceland in Helsinki, Finland

On 17 September 2016, Iceland repeated their success and qualified to the continental tournament once again. The national team finished its qualification group as the runners-up behind Belgium, and above Cyprus and Switzerland, with four wins and two losses.

As in the previous edition though, Iceland finished their participation with five loses in five matches played in their Group A pool in Helsinki.

=== EuroBasket 2022 qualification ===
After failing to qualify for the 2019 FIBA World Cup, Iceland turned the page toward EuroBasket 2022. To attempt to qualify for three consecutive EuroBasket appearances, Iceland was placed into Group C to begin their pre-qualifying campaign, which began with two straight loses to Portugal, and Belgium. Although the national team would pick up their first win in their third game, a rematch with Portugal at home in Reykjavík. In their final match of group play the team fell to Belgium, and would have to survive the final window of pre-qualifiers if they were to advance.

For the final phase of pre-qualifiers, Iceland was placed into Group H, alongside Portugal once again, and Switzerland. The national team opened up group play with a tough loss on the road against Portugal 80–79. Looking to even their record at (1-1), Iceland was at home against Switzerland. The match stayed close throughout until Martin Hermannsson's heroics showed up late in the fourth quarter for Iceland; where his jumpshot in the final seconds gave the home side an momentous 83–82 victory. Heading into their next match the national team looked to capitalize on their last win. They did so in thorough fashion, dismantling Portugal 96–68 to set up one last show down with the Swiss.

Heading into the final match day with a place in the qualifiers on the line, Iceland needed to defeat Switzerland on the road in an hostile environment. The specifics for Iceland was clear, either win to clinch a spot, or avoid losing by 18 or more points. Unfortunately, the unthinkable happened. As the national team not only lost to Switzerland, but failed to cover the point difference needed to advance. Losing 109–85, eliminating any chance for Iceland to reach the finals for the third straight time.

=== World Cup 2023 qualification ===
Going into their last game of the qualifications, Iceland needed a four point win against Georgia to qualify for the 2023 World Cup. However, despite an 80–77 win, they missed out of qualifying after Elvar Már Friðriksson's shot at the buzzer rimmed out.

=== EuroBasket 2025 ===
On 23 February 2025, Iceland qualified for EuroBasket 2025 after beating Turkey 83–71, and securing second place in Group B.

== Competitive record ==
=== FIBA World Cup ===
World Cup					Qualification		
Year	Position	Pld	W	L	Pld	W	L
1950 to 1959	No national representative						
(Brazil) 1963	Did not enter				Did not enter		
(Uruguay) 1967	Did not enter				Did not enter		
(Socialist Federal Republic of Yugoslavia) 1970	Did not qualify				Did not qualify		
(Puerto Rico) 1974	Did not enter				Did not enter		
(Philippines) 1978	Did not qualify				EuroBasket served as qualifiers		
(Colombia) 1982	Did not qualify				EuroBasket served as qualifiers		
(Spain) 1986	Did not qualify				EuroBasket served as qualifiers		
(Argentina) 1990	Did not qualify				EuroBasket served as qualifiers		
(Canada) 1994	Did not qualify				EuroBasket served as qualifiers		
(Greece) 1998	Did not qualify				EuroBasket served as qualifiers		
(United States) 2002	Did not qualify				EuroBasket served as qualifiers		
(Japan) 2006	Did not qualify				EuroBasket served as qualifiers		
(Turkey) 2010	Did not qualify				EuroBasket served as qualifiers		
(Spain) 2014	Did not qualify				EuroBasket served as qualifiers		
(China) 2019	Did not qualify				6	2	4
(Philippines) (Japan) (Indonesia) 2023	Did not qualify				20	12	8
(Qatar) 2027	To be determined				In progress		
(France) 2031	To be determined				To be determined		
Total	0/16				26	14	12

=== Olympic Games ===
Olympic Games					Qualifying		
Year	Position	Pld	W	L	Pld	W	L
1936 to 1956	No national representative						
(Italy) 1960	Did not enter				Did not enter		
(Japan) 1964	Did not enter				Did not enter		
(Mexico) 1968	Did not enter				Did not enter		
(West Germany) 1972	Did not enter				Did not enter		
(Canada) 1976	Did not qualify				5	0	5
(Soviet Union) 1980	Did not enter				Did not enter		
(United States) 1984	Did not enter				Did not enter		
(South Korea) 1988	Did not enter				Did not enter		
(Spain) 1992	Did not qualify				6	0	6
1996 to 2016	Did not qualify				Did not qualify		
(Japan) 2020	Did not qualify				Did not qualify		
(France) 2024	Did not qualify				3	1	2
(United States) 2028	To be determined				To be determined		
Total	0/17				14	1	13

=== Games of the Small States of Europe ===
Games of the Small States of Europe
Year	Position	Pld	W	L
(San Marino) 1987	2nd place, silver medalist(s)	3	2	1
(Monaco) 1989	3rd place, bronze medalist(s)	3	2	1
(Cyprus) 1991	1st place, gold medalist(s)	4	4	0
(Andorra) 1993	1st place, gold medalist(s)	5	5	0
(Malta) 1995	3rd place, bronze medalist(s)	4	3	1
(Iceland) 1997	3rd place, bronze medalist(s)	4	3	1
(San Marino) 2001	2nd place, silver medalist(s)	5	4	1
(Malta) 2003	2nd place, silver medalist(s)	5	4	1
(Andorra) 2005	2nd place, silver medalist(s)	4	3	1
(Monaco) 2007	1st place, gold medalist(s)	5	5	0
(Cyprus) 2009	4th	5	3	2
(Luxembourg) 2013	3rd place, bronze medalist(s)	4	2	2
(Iceland) 2015	2nd place, silver medalist(s)	3	2	1
(San Marino) 2017	3rd place, bronze medalist(s)	5	2	3
(Montenegro) 2019	3rd place, bronze medalist(s)	4	2	2
Total		63	46	17

=== EuroBasket ===
EuroBasket					Qualification		
Year	Position	Pld	W	L	Pld	W	L
1935 to 1959	No national representative						
(Socialist Federal Republic of Yugoslavia) 1961	Did not enter						
(Poland) 1963	Did not enter				Did not enter		
(Soviet Union) 1965	Did not enter				Did not enter		
(Finland) 1967	Did not enter				Did not enter		
(Italy) 1969	Did not qualify				3	1	2
(West Germany) 1971	Did not enter				Did not enter		
(Spain) 1973	Did not enter				Did not enter		
(Socialist Federal Republic of Yugoslavia) 1975	Did not qualify				5	1	4
(Belgium) 1977	Did not qualify				5	3	2
(Italy) 1979	Did not enter				Did not enter		
(Czechoslovakia) 1981	Did not qualify				4	3	1
(France) 1983	Did not qualify				5	2	3
(West Germany) 1985	Did not qualify				4	1	3
(Greece) 1987	Did not qualify				9	4	5
(Socialist Federal Republic of Yugoslavia) 1989	Did not qualify				3	0	3
(Italy) 1991	Did not qualify				4	0	4
(Germany) 1993	Did not qualify				4	2	2
(Greece) 1995	Did not qualify				5	3	2
(Spain) 1997	Did not qualify				6	3	3
(France) 1999	Did not qualify				15	3	12
(Turkey) 2001	Did not qualify				15	4	11
(Sweden) 2003	Did not qualify				6	0	6
(Serbia and Montenegro) 2005	Division B				4	2	2
(Spain) 2007	Division B				8	4	4
(Poland) 2009	Division B				8	3	5
(Lithuania) 2011	Did not enter				Did not enter		
(Slovenia) 2013	Did not qualify				10	1	9
(France) (Croatia) (Germany) (Latvia) 2015	24th	5	0	5	4	2	2
(Finland) (Israel) (Romania) (Turkey) 2017	24th	5	0	5	6	4	2
(Czech Republic) (Georgia (country)) (Italy) (Germany) 2022	Did not qualify				8	3	5
(Cyprus) (Finland) (Poland) (Latvia) 2025	22nd	5	0	5	6	3	3
(Estonia) (Greece) (Slovenia) (Spain) 2029	To be determined				To be determined		
Total	3/31	15	0	15	147	52	95

=== Championship for Small Countries ===
FIBA European Championship for Small Countries
Year	Position	Pld	W	L
(Malta) 1988	1st place, gold medalist(s)	5	4	1
(Wales) 1990	1st place, gold medalist(s)	5	5	0
(Republic of Ireland) 1994	3rd place, bronze medalist(s)	5	3	2
Total		15	12	3

== Results and fixtures ==
Win Loss

=== 2025 ===
27 November 2025 2027 FIBA World Cup qualifiers – 1st round	Italy	76–81	Iceland	Tortona, tItaly
20:00 (UTC+1)	Scoring by quarter: 21–21, 13–17, 20–23, 22–20
	Pts: Casarin 19; Rebs: Tessitori 10; Asts: Tessitori 5	Boxscore	Pts: Friðriksson 29; Rebs: Hlinason 7 Asts: Friðriksson 5	Arena: PalaFerraris; Attendance: 4,711; Referees: Andris Aunkrogers (LAT), Dariusz Zapolski (POL), Ofer Manheim (ISR)

30 November 2025 2027 FIBA World Cup qualifiers – 1st round	Iceland	84–90	Great Britain	Reykjavík, Iceland
16:45 (UTC+0)	Scoring by quarter: 17–17, 18–26, 16–26, 33–21
	Pts: Hermannsson 18; Rebs: Pálsson 10; Asts: Friðriksson 8	Boxscore	Pts: Wheatle 22; Rebs: Yeboah 7 Asts: Ellis 8	Arena: Laugardalshöll; Attendance: 1,800; Referees: Mihkel Männiste (EST), Edgard Ceccarelli (FRA), Ioannis Agrafiotis (GRE)

=== 2026 ===
27 February 2026 2027 FIBA World Cup qualifiers – 1st round	Iceland	86–85	Lithuania	Reykjavík, Iceland
19:30 (UTC+0)	Scoring by quarter: 24–21, 19–23, 11–24, 32–17
	Pts: Friðriksson 34; Rebs: Hlinason 5 Asts: Friðriksson 6	Boxscore	Pts: Blaževič 19; Rebs: Blaževič 11; Asts: Žemaitis 6	Arena: Laugardalshöll; Attendance: 1,886; Referees: Boris Krejić (SVN), Yener Yılmaz (TUR), Alberto Sánchez (ESP)

2 March 2026 2027 FIBA World Cup qualifiers – 1st round	Lithuania	99–82	Iceland	Klaipėda, Lithuania
18:30 (UTC+2)	Scoring by quarter: 26–12, 26–19, 27–23, 20–26
	Pts: Brazdeikis 27; Rebs: Kačinas 7 Asts: Žemaitis 5	Boxscore	Pts: Pálsson 23; Rebs: Guðmundsson 8 Asts: Friðriksson 8	Arena: Švyturys Arena; Attendance: 5,079; Referees: Ademir Zurapović (BIH), Fernando Calatrava (ESP), Mehmet Şahin (TUR)

2 July 2026 2027 FIBA World Cup qualifiers – 1st round	Iceland	83–102	Italy	Reykjavík, Iceland
19:45 (UTC+0)	Scoring by quarter: 25–27, 21–31, 16–26, 21–18
	Pts: Hermannsson 22; Rebs: Guðmundsson, Hlinason 6 Asts: Friðriksson 6	Boxscore	Pts: Baldasso 16; Rebs: Emejuru 5 Asts: Mannion 6	Arena: Laugardalshöll; Attendance: 1,950; Referees: Yohan Rosso (FRA), Josip Jurčević (CRO), Zafer Yılmaz (TUR)

5 July 2026 2027 FIBA World Cup qualifiers – 1st round	Great Britain	86–88	Iceland	Manchester, England
15:00 (UTC+1)	Scoring by quarter: 24–19, 25–22, 20–21, 17–26
	Pts: Uduje 23; Rebs: Wheatle 11; Asts: Uduje 6	Boxscore	Pts: Guðmundsson 25; Rebs: Guðmundsson, Hlinason 8 Asts: Friðriksson 10	Arena: National Basketball Performance Centre; Attendance: 2,045; Referees: Marius Ciulin (ROU), Siniša Prpa (SRB), Ariadna Chueca (ESP)

28 August 2026 2027 FIBA World Cup qualifiers – 2nd round	Serbia	102–73	Iceland	Belgrade, Serbia
20:00 (UTC+2)	Scoring by quarter: 25–27, 27–15, 18–19, 32–12
	Pts: Tanasković 23; Rebs: Jokić 13; Asts: Gudurić, Jokić 6	Boxscore	Pts: Friðriksson 19; Rebs: Guðmundsson 10; Asts: Friðriksson 5	Arena: Belgrade Arena; Attendance: 12,384; Referees: Luis Castillo (ESP), Valentin Oliot (FRA), Zdenko Tomašević (SVK)

31 August 2026 2027 FIBA World Cup qualifiers – 2nd round	Iceland	73–110	Turkey	Reykjavík, Iceland
19:30 (UTC+0)	Scoring by quarter: 14–33, 23–27, 19–20, 17–30
	Pts: Hermannsson, Pálsson 11; Rebs: Hlinason 9 Asts: Friðriksson 5	Boxscore	Pts: Bitim, Osman 17; Rebs: Bona 10; Asts: Flynn 8	Arena: Laugardalshöll; Attendance: 1,873; Referees: Antonio Conde (ESP), Andris Aunkrogers (LAT), Elvis Binders-Čoders (LAT)

26 November 2026 2027 FIBA World Cup qualifiers – 2nd round	Iceland	vs.	Bosnia and Herzegovina	Reykjavík, Iceland
19:30 (UTC+0)
		Boxscore		Arena: Laugardalshöll

29 November 2026 2027 FIBA World Cup qualifiers – 2nd round	Turkey	vs.	Iceland	Istanbul, Turkey
19:00 (UTC+3)
		Boxscore		Arena: Turkcell Basketball Development Center

=== 2027 ===
26 February 2027 2027 FIBA World Cup qualifiers – 2nd round	Iceland	vs.	Serbia	Iceland
--:-- (UTC+0)
		Boxscore

1 March 2027 2027 FIBA World Cup qualifiers – 2nd round	Bosnia and Herzegovina	vs.	Iceland	Bosnia and Herzegovina
--:-- (UTC+1)
		Boxscore

== Team ==
=== Current roster ===
Roster for the 2027 FIBA World Cup Qualifiers matches on 28 and 31 August 2026 against Serbia and Turkey.

Iceland men's national basketball team roster
Players
Coaches

Pos.	No.	Name	Age – Date of birth	Height	Club	Ctr.
PG	5	Hilmar Smári Henningsson	25 – 3 September 2000	1.92 m (6 ft 4 in)	Stjarnan	(Iceland)
SF	6	Jón Axel Guðmundsson	29 – 27 October 1996	1.96 m (6 ft 5 in)	Burgos	(Spain)
G/F	9	Þórir Þorbjarnarson	28 – 26 May 1998	1.98 m (6 ft 6 in)	KR	(Iceland)
PG	10	Elvar Már Friðriksson	31 – 11 November 1994	1.83 m (6 ft 0 in)	Neptūnas	(Lithuania)
G	12	Kári Jónsson	29 – 27 August 1997	1.90 m (6 ft 3 in)	Valur	(Iceland)
G	14	Kristinn Pálsson	28 – 17 December 1997	1.97 m (6 ft 6 in)	Valur	(Iceland)
SG	15	Martin Hermannsson	31 – 16 September 1994	1.90 m (6 ft 3 in)	Alba Berlin	(Germany)
SG	16	Bragi Guðmundsson	22 – 7 October 2003	1.96 m (6 ft 5 in)	Grindavík	(Iceland)
F	18	Sigurður Pétursson	24 – 8 March 2002	1.96 m (6 ft 5 in)	Álftanes	(Iceland)
C	32	Tryggvi Hlinason	28 – 28 October 1997	2.15 m (7 ft 1 in)	Bilbao	(Spain)
F	34	Styrmir Snær Þrastarson	25 – 2 August 2001	2.01 m (6 ft 7 in)	Mons-Hainaut	(Belgium)
F	41	Bjarni Jónsson	27 – 14 June 1999	1.99 m (6 ft 6 in)	Stjarnan	(Iceland)
PG	66	Sigtryggur Arnar Björnsson	33 – 7 March 1993	1.84 m (6 ft 0 in)	Tindastóll	(Iceland)

Head coach

- (Canada) Craig Pedersen

Assistant coach(es)

- (Iceland) Baldur Þór Ragnarsson
- (Iceland) Viðar Örn Hafsteinsson

Legend

- (C) Team captain
- Club – describes last
  club before the competition
- Age – describes age
  on 28 August 2026

=== Depth chart ===
Pos.	Starting 5	Bench 1	Bench 2
C	Tryggvi Hlinason	Ragnar Nathanaelsson	Tómas Þórður Hilmarsson
PF	Kristinn Pálsson	Kristófer Acox	Ólafur Ólafsson
SF	Jón Axel Guðmundsson	Gunnar Ólafsson	Haukur Pálsson
SG	Martin Hermannsson	Kári Jónsson	Hörður Vilhjálmsson
PG	Elvar Már Friðriksson	Ægir Steinarsson	Sigtryggur Arnar Björnsson

== Head coach position ==
- (Iceland) Hilmar Hafsteinsson – (1984)
- (Iceland) Einar Bollason – (1985–1987)
- (Hungary) László Németh – (1988–1990)
- (Iceland) Torfi Magnússon – (1990–1995)
- (Iceland) Jón Kr. Gíslason – (1995–1999)
- (Iceland) Friðrik Ingi Rúnarsson – (1999–2003)
- (Iceland) Sigurður Ingimundarson – (2004–2009)
- (Sweden) Peter Öqvist – (2011–2013)
- (Canada) Craig Pedersen – (2014–present)

== Individual records ==
=== Players with the most caps (games played) ===
- Players in **bold** are still active.

Rank	Player	Years	Caps
1.	Guðmundur Bragason	1987-2003	169
2.	Valur Ingimundarson	1980-1995	164
3.	Jón Kr. Gíslason	1982-1995	158
4.	Logi Gunnarsson	2000-2018	147
5.	Torfi Magnússon	1974-1987	131
6.	Hlynur Bæringsson	2000-2019	125
7.	Guðjón Skúlason	1988-1999	122
8.	Jón Sigurðsson	1968-1984	120
9.	Teitur Örlygsson	1986-2000	118
10.	Friðrik Stefánsson	1997-2008	112
11.	Herbert Arnarson	1991-2002	111
12.	Falur Harðarson	1989-2000	106
13.	Jón Arnar Ingvarsson	1990-2000	102
14.	Jón Arnór Stefánsson	2000-2019	100

== Past rosters ==
2015 EuroBasket: finished 24th among 24 teams

3 Martin Hermannsson, 4 Axel Kárason, 5 Ragnar Nathanaelsson, 6 Jakob Sigurðarson, 8 Hlynur Bæringsson (C),
9 Jón Arnór Stefánsson, 10 Helgi Már Magnússon, 13 Hörður Vilhjálmsson, 14 Logi Gunnarsson, 15 Pavel Ermolinskij,
24 Haukur Pálsson, 29 Ægir Steinarsson (Coach: Craig Pedersen)

2017 EuroBasket: finished 24th among 24 teams

1 Martin Hermannsson, 3 Ægir Steinarsson, 6 Kristófer Acox, 8 Hlynur Bæringsson (C), 9 Jón Arnór Stefánsson,
10 Elvar Már Friðriksson, 13 Hörður Vilhjálmsson, 14 Logi Gunnarsson, 15 Pavel Ermolinskij, 24 Haukur Pálsson, 34 Tryggvi Hlinason, 88 Brynjar Þór Björnsson (Coach: Craig Pedersen)

2025 EuroBasket: finished 22nd among 24 teams

3 Ægir Steinarsson, 5 Hilmar Smári Henningsson, 6 Jón Axel Guðmundsson, 10 Elvar Már Friðriksson, 11 Almar Orri Atlason,
12 Kári Jónsson, 14 Kristinn Pálsson, 15 Martin Hermannsson, 29 Orri Gunnarsson, 32 Tryggvi Hlinason, 34 Styrmir Snær Þrastarson,
66 Sigtryggur Arnar Björnsson (Coach: Craig Pedersen)

== See also ==
- Sport in Iceland
- Iceland women's national basketball team
- Iceland men's national under-20 basketball team
- Iceland men's national under-18 basketball team
- Iceland men's national under-16 basketball team
