= 1988 European Promotion Cup for Men =

International basketball tournament

Tournament details
- Host country: Malta
- Dates: 14–18 December 1988
- Teams: 8 (from 1 confederation)
- Venue(s): 1 (in 1 host city)

Final positions
- Champions: Iceland (1st title)
- Runners-up: Ireland
- Third place: Cyprus

Official website
- www.fibaeurope.com

The 1988 European Promotion Cup for Men was the inaugural edition of the European Promotion Cup for Men, the international basketball tournament, today known as the FIBA European Championship for Small Countries. The event took place in Malta from 14 to 18 December 1988. Iceland won the tournament after beating Ireland in the final.

== Participating teams ==
- Cyprus
- Gibraltar
- Iceland
- Ireland
- Luxembourg
- Malta
- San Marino
- Wales

== Group stage ==
The eight teams were drawn into two groups of four teams each.

=== Group A ===
Pos	Team	Pld	W	L	PF	PA	PD	Pts	Qualification
1	Ireland	3	3	0	264	201	+63	6	Semifinals
2	Iceland	3	2	1	237	200	+37	5	Semifinals
3	San Marino	3	1	2	233	216	+17	4	5th–8th place playoffs
4	Gibraltar	3	0	3	167	284	−117	3	5th–8th place playoffs

Source: FIBA Archive

14 December 1988
Ireland	114–59	Gibraltar	Malta
San Marino	75–83	Iceland	Malta
15 December 1988
Ireland	71–68	Iceland	Malta
San Marino	84–54	Gibraltar	Malta
16 December 1988
Iceland	86–54	Gibraltar	Malta
Ireland	79–74	San Marino	Malta

=== Group B ===
Pos	Team	Pld	W	L	PF	PA	PD	Pts	Qualification
1	Cyprus	3	3	0	254	187	+67	6	Semifinals
2	Luxembourg	3	2	1	276	242	+34	5	Semifinals
3	Malta (H)	3	1	2	207	247	−40	4	5th–8th place playoffs
4	Wales	3	0	3	197	258	−61	3	5th–8th place playoffs

Source: FIBA Archive
(H) Hosts

14 December 1988
Wales	78–105	Luxembourg	Malta
Malta	58–86	Cyprus	Malta
15 December 1988
Cyprus	94–79	Luxembourg	Malta
Malta	79–69	Wales	Malta
16 December 1988
Wales	50–74	Cyprus	Malta
Malta	70–92	Luxembourg	Malta

== Knockout stage ==
=== 5th–8th place playoffs ===
5th–8th place semifinals
17 December, Malta
Wales	68
San Marino	72
17 December, Malta
Malta	74
Gibraltar	69

5th place match
18 December, Malta
San Marino	82
Malta	72
7th place match
18 December, Malta
Wales	75
Gibraltar	77

=== Championship playoffs ===
Semifinals
17 December, Malta
Luxembourg	87
Ireland	91
17 December, Malta
Iceland	108
Cyprus	78

Final
18 December, Malta
Ireland	69
Iceland	86
3rd place match
18 December, Malta
Luxembourg	68
Cyprus	73

1988 European Promotion Cup winners

Iceland
First title

== Final standings ==
Rank	Team
1st place, gold medalist(s)	Iceland
2nd place, silver medalist(s)	Ireland
3rd place, bronze medalist(s)	Cyprus
4	Luxembourg
5	San Marino
6	Malta
7	Gibraltar
8	Wales
