= Basketball at the 2009 Games of the Small States of Europe =

- Venue: Eleftheria Indoor Hall
- Dates: 2-6 June

Basketball at the 2009 Games of the Small States of Europe was held from 2 to 6 June 2009. Games were played at the Eleftheria Indoor Hall, in Nicosia.

== Medal summary ==
Event	Gold	Silver	Bronze
Men	Cyprus	Luxembourg	Andorra
Women	Malta	Iceland	Cyprus

== Men's tournament ==
Men's tournament was played with a round-robin group composed by six teams.

=== Table ===
Pos	Team	Pld	W	L	PF	PA	PD	Pts	Qualification	(Cyprus)	(Luxembourg)	(Andorra)	(Iceland)	(Malta)	(San Marino)
1	Cyprus (H, C)	5	5	0	410	292	+118	10	Gold medal	—	80–57			69–55	
2	Luxembourg	5	3	2	407	366	+41	8	Silver medal		—	95–97	74–66		94–61
3	Andorra	5	3	2	405	337	+68	8	Bronze medal	70–91		—	77–82	82–62	
4	Iceland	5	3	2	388	330	+58	8		54–87			—	93–53	93–39
5	Malta	5	1	4	308	392	−84	6			62–87			—	76–61
6	San Marino	5	0	5	264	425	−161	5		56–83		47–79			—

Source: Cyprus 2009 website
(C) Champions; (H) Hosts

== Women's tournament ==
Women's tournament was played by only four teams.

=== Table ===
Pos	Team	Pld	W	L	PF	PA	PD	Pts	Qualification	(Malta)	(Iceland)	(Cyprus)	(Luxembourg)
1	Malta (C)	3	3	0	170	146	+24	6	Gold medal	—		53–48	48–45
2	Iceland	3	2	1	194	175	+19	5	Silver medal	53–69	—		80–55
3	Cyprus (H)	3	1	2	167	169	−2	4	Bronze medal		51–61	—	68–55
4	Luxembourg	3	0	3	155	196	−41	3					—

Source: Cyprus 2009 website
(C) Champions; (H) Hosts
