= Basketball at the 2015 Games of the Small States of Europe =

Basketball at the 2015 Games of the Small States of Europe was held from 1 to 6 June 2015.

== Medal summary ==
| Event | Gold | Silver | Bronze |
|---|---|---|---|
| Men | Montenegro | Iceland | Luxembourg |
| Women | Luxembourg | Iceland | Malta |

== Men's tournament ==
Men's tournament was played by only four teams:

=== Table ===
| Team | Pld | W | L | PF | PA | PD | Pts |
|---|---|---|---|---|---|---|---|
| Montenegro | 3 | 3 | 0 | 276 | 211 | +65 | 6 |
| Iceland | 3 | 2 | 1 | 248 | 235 | +13 | 5 |
| Luxembourg | 3 | 1 | 2 | 223 | 245 | −22 | 4 |
| Andorra | 3 | 0 | 3 | 209 | 265 | −56 | 3 |

=== Matches ===
2 June 2015
17:00

Boxscore

| Luxembourg | 58–85 | Montenegro |
Scoring by quarter: 18–24, 14–21, 19–19, 7–21
| Pts: Schumacher 15; Rebs: Stephens 8 Asts: Schumacher 4 | | Pts: Vranješ 19; Rebs: Sekulić 7 Asts: Sekulić 4 |

Laugardalshöll, Reykjavík

3 June 2015
17:00

Boxscore

| Iceland | 83–61 | Andorra |
Scoring by quarter: 28–18, 19–15, 20–15, 16–13
| Pts: Gunnarsson 16; Rebs: Nathanaelsson 7 Asts: Steinarsson 8 | | Pts: Gabriel 12; Rebs: Gabriel 8 Asts: Colom 4 |

Laugardalshöll, Reykjavík

4 June 2015
14:00

Report

| Montenegro | 89–69 | Andorra |
Scoring by quarter: 28–19, 20–18, 25–12, 16–20
| Pts: Dašić 13; Rebs: Dašić 8 Asts: Pavličević 8 | | Pts: Colom 17; Rebs: Marín 7 Asts: Galera 3 |

Laugardalshöll, Reykjavík

4 June 2015
19:30

Report

| Iceland | 81–72 | Luxembourg |
Scoring by quarter: 14–16, 27–18, 24–13, 16–25
| Pts: Sigurðarson 19; Rebs: Acox 11; Asts: Steinarsson 6 | | Pts: Stephens 21; Rebs: Müller 12; Asts: Picard 5 |

Laugardalshöll, Reykjavík

5 June 2015
17:00

Boxscore

| Luxembourg | 93–79 | Andorra |
Scoring by quarter: 21–17, 16–23, 22–19, 34–20
| Pts: Schumacher 30; Rebs: Stephens 10; Asts: Müller 7 | | Pts: Galera 19; Rebs: Marín 7 Asts: Galera 10 |

Laugardalshöll, Reykjavík

6 June 2015
17:00

Boxscore

| Iceland | 84–102 | Montenegro |
Scoring by quarter: 18–28, 23–33, 18–15, 25–26
| Pts: Bæringsson 19; Rebs: Acox 9 Asts: Steinarsson 6 | | Pts: Šehović, Đukanović 19; Rebs: Dašić, Vranješ 7 Asts: Pavličević 6 |

Laugardalshöll, Reykjavík

== Women's tournament ==
Women's tournament will be played by only four teams:

=== Table ===
| Team | Pld | W | L | PF | PA | PD | Pts |
|---|---|---|---|---|---|---|---|
| Luxembourg | 3 | 3 | 0 | 211 | 151 | +60 | 6 |
| Iceland | 3 | 2 | 1 | 218 | 187 | +31 | 5 |
| Malta | 3 | 1 | 2 | 187 | 199 | −12 | 4 |
| Monaco | 3 | 0 | 3 | 151 | 241 | −90 | 3 |

=== Matches ===
2 June 2015
12:00

Boxscore

| Luxembourg | 88–55 | Monaco |
Scoring by quarter: 16–9, 19–13, 33–22, 20–11
| Pts: Jablonowski 17; Rebs: Jablonowski 10; Asts: Schmit 9 | | Pts: Peglion 20; Rebs: Peglion 8 Asts: Peglion 4 |

Laugardalshöll, Reykjavík
Referees: Adalsteinn Hjartarson (ISL), Leifur Sigfinnur Garðarsson (ISL)

2 June 2015
19:30

| Iceland | 83–73 | Malta |

3 June 2015
19:30

| Luxembourg | 64–42 | Malta |

4 June 2015
17:00

| Iceland | 81–55 | Monaco |

5 June 2015
21:30

| Monaco | 41–72 | Malta |

6 June 2015
13:30

| Iceland | 54–59 | Luxembourg |
