= Basketball at the 1991 Games of the Small States of Europe =

- Venue: Andorra la Vella
- Dates: 21-25 May

Basketball at the 1991 Games of the Small States of Europe was played in Andorra la Vella, between 21 and 25 May 1991.

== Medal summary ==
Event	Gold	Silver	Bronze
Men	Iceland	Luxembourg	Cyprus
Women	Luxembourg	Cyprus	Iceland

== Men's tournament ==
=== Group stage ===
Pos	Team	Pld	W	L	PF	PA	PD	Pts	Qualification	(Iceland)	(Cyprus)	(Monaco)
1	Iceland	2	2	0	192	168	+24	4	Semifinals	—		101–91
2	Cyprus	2	1	1	244	252	−8	3	Semifinals	77–91	—	85–76
3	Monaco	2	0	2	167	186	−19	2				—

Pos	Team	Pld	W	L	PF	PA	PD	Pts	Qualification	(Luxembourg)	(Andorra)	(Malta)	(San Marino)
1	Luxembourg	3	2	1	0	0	0	5	Semifinals	—	L	84–57	100–73
2	Andorra (H)	3	2	1	0	0	0	5	Semifinals		—	63–77	W
3	Malta	3	2	1	199	207	−8	5				—	65–60
4	San Marino	3	0	3	0	0	0	3					—

(H) Hosts

=== Fifth position game ===
Malta	94–83	Monaco

=== Final bracket ===
Semifinals
Luxembourg	85
Cyprus	82
Iceland	79
Andorra	65

Final
Luxembourg	53
Iceland	85
Third place
Cyprus	86
Andorra	62

== Women's tournament ==
Pos	Team	Pld	W	L	PF	PA	PD	Pts	Qualification	(Luxembourg)	(Cyprus)	(Iceland)	(Malta)
1	Luxembourg	3	3	0	0	0	0	6	Gold medal	—		63–38	78–16
2	Cyprus	3	2	1	0	0	0	5	Silver medal		—	47–40	
3	Iceland	3	1	2	146	145	+1	4	Bronze medal			—	68–35
4	Malta	3	0	3	0	0	0	3					—
