= Basketball at the 2003 Games of the Small States of Europe =

- Venue: University Sports Complex
- Dates: 3-7 June

Basketball at the 2003 Games of the Small States of Europe was held from 3 to 7 June 2003. Games were played at the University Sports Complex of Gzira.

== Medal summary ==
Event	Gold	Silver	Bronze
Men	Cyprus	Iceland	Luxembourg
Women	Malta	Cyprus	Iceland

== Men's tournament ==
Men's tournament was played by seven teams divided into two groups where the two first qualified teams would join the semifinals.

=== Preliminary round ===
==== Group A ====
Pos	Team	Pld	W	L	PF	PA	PD	Pts	Qualification	(Cyprus)	(Luxembourg)	(Monaco)
1	Cyprus	2	2	0	186	114	+72	4	Semifinals	—		96–54
2	Luxembourg	2	1	1	144	147	−3	3	Semifinals	60–90	—	
3	Monaco	2	0	2	111	180	−69	2	5th position game		57–84	—

Source: NOC Malta

=== Group B ===
Pos	Team	Pld	W	L	PF	PA	PD	Pts	Qualification	(Iceland)	(San Marino)	(Andorra)	(Malta)
1	Iceland	3	3	0	254	181	+73	6	Semifinals	—	67–64		
2	San Marino	3	2	1	216	208	+8	5	Semifinals		—	78–74	74–67
3	Andorra	3	1	2	215	248	−33	4	5th position game	72–108		—	69–62
4	Malta (H, E)	3	0	3	174	222	−48	3		45–79			—

Source: NOC Malta
(E) Eliminated; (H) Hosts

=== Final round ===
Semifinals
Cyprus	76
San Marino	61
Iceland	77
Luxembourg	60

Final
Cyprus	79
Iceland	77
Third place
San Marino	56
Luxembourg	66

=== Fifth position game ===
Monaco	68
Andorra	69

== Women's tournament ==
Women's tournament was played by only four teams.

=== Table ===
Pos	Team	Pld	W	L	PF	PA	PD	Pts	Qualification	(Malta)	(Cyprus)	(Iceland)	(Luxembourg)
1	Malta (H)	3	3	0	182	139	+43	6	Gold medal	—	64–42	59–47	59–50
2	Cyprus	3	2	1	178	176	+2	5	Silver medal		—		70–63
3	Iceland	3	1	2	156	181	−25	4	Bronze medal		49–66	—	
4	Luxembourg	3	0	3	169	189	−20	3				56–60	—

Source: NOC Malta
(H) Hosts
