= Basketball at the 2005 Games of the Small States of Europe =

International basketball competition

- Venue: Eleftheria Indoor Hall
- Dates: 30 May-4 June

Basketball at the 2005 Games of the Small States of Europe was held from 30 May to 4 June 2005. Games were played at the Poliesportiu d'Andorra, in Andorra la Vella, Andorra.

== Medal summary ==
Event	Gold	Silver	Bronze
Men	Cyprus	Iceland	Luxembourg
Women	Luxembourg	Iceland	Malta

== Men's tournament ==
Men's tournament was played by a round-robin group composed by five teams.

=== Table ===
Pos	Team	Pld	W	L	PF	PA	PD	Pts	Qualification	(Cyprus)	(Iceland)	(Luxembourg)	(San Marino)	(Andorra)
1	Cyprus (C)	4	4	0	327	282	+45	8	Gold medal	—			70–65	86–78
2	Iceland	4	3	1	330	308	+22	7	Silver medal	56–80	—			107–77
3	Luxembourg	4	2	2	316	309	+7	6	Bronze medal	83–91	69–73	—		
4	San Marino	4	1	3	276	294	−18	5			82–94	60–67	—	
5	Andorra (H)	4	0	4	303	359	−56	4				85–97	63–69	—

Source: Andorra 2005, Cypriot Olympic Committee report
(C) Champions; (H) Hosts

== Women's tournament ==
Women's tournament was played by a round-robin group composed by four teams.

=== Table ===
Pos	Team	Pld	W	L	PF	PA	PD	Pts	Qualification	(Luxembourg)	(Iceland)	(Malta)	(Andorra)
1	Luxembourg (C)	3	3	0	195	125	+70	6	Gold medal	—		63–37	75–40
2	Iceland	3	2	1	207	136	+71	5	Silver medal	48–57	—		71–29
3	Malta	3	1	2	143	193	−50	4	Bronze medal		50–88	—	
4	Andorra (H)	3	0	3	111	202	−91	3				42–56	—

Source: Andorra 2005
(C) Champions; (H) Hosts
