= Ægir Steinarsson =

Icelandic basketball player (born 1991)

Ægir Þór Steinarsson
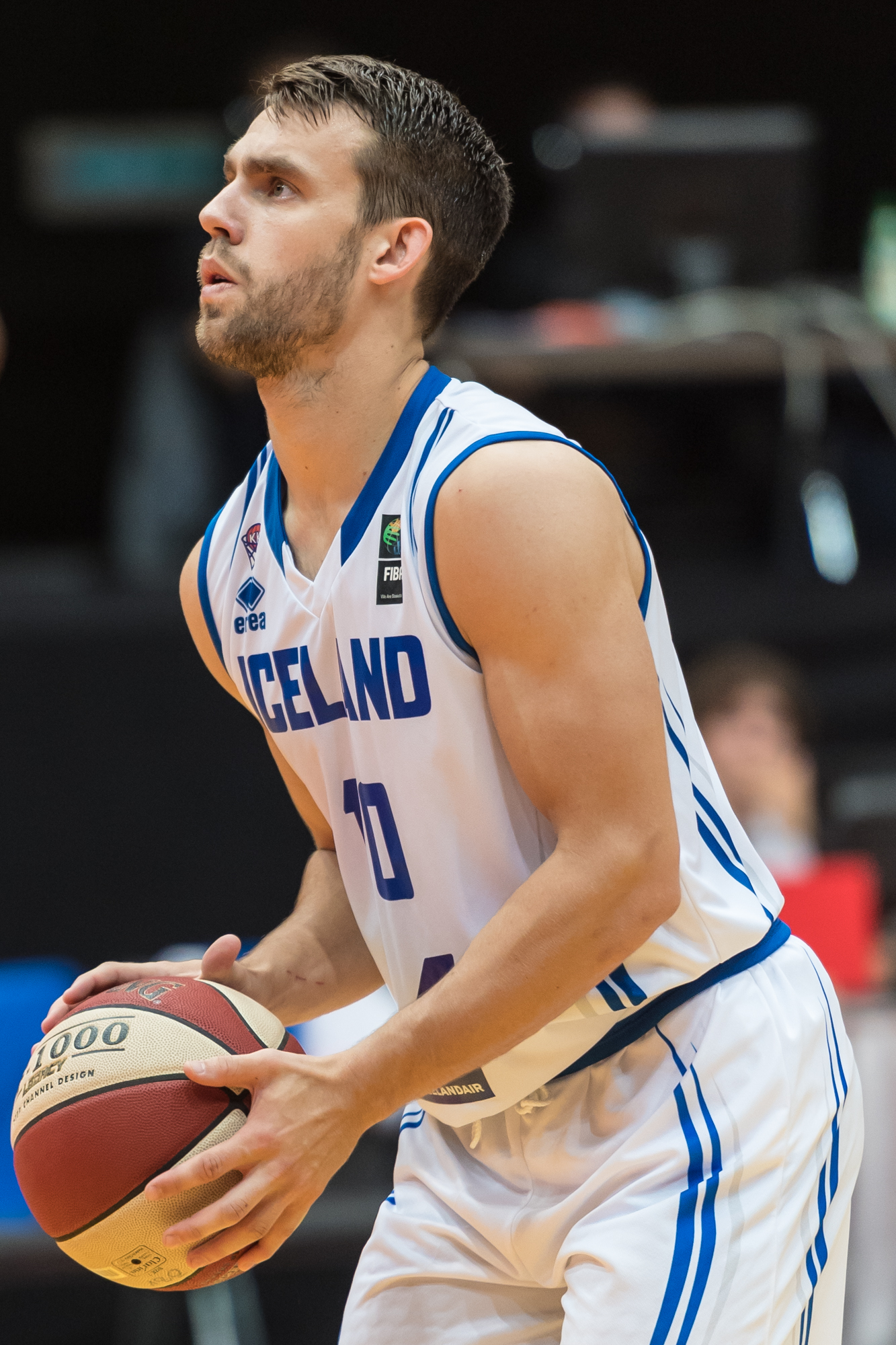

Stjarnan
- Position: Point guard
- League: Úrvalsdeild karla

Personal information
- Born: 10 May 1991 (age 35) Reykjavík, Iceland
- Listed height: 183 cm (6 ft 0 in)
- Listed weight: 84 kg (185 lb)

Career information
- College: Newberry (2011–2013)
- Playing career: 2008–present

Career history
- 2008–2011: Fjölnir
- 2013–2015: Sundsvall Dragons
- 2015–2016: KR
- 2016: Peñas Huesca
- 2016–2017: Miraflores
- 2017–2018: Castelló
- 2018–2021: Stjarnan
- 2019: Regatas Corrientes
- 2021–2022: Gipuzkoa Basket
- 2022–2023: Lucentum Alicante
- 2023–present: Stjarnan

Career highlights
- Icelandic champion (2025); 3x Icelandic Cup (2016, 2019, 2020); 3x Icelandic Super Cup (2015, 2019, 2020); Euskal Kopa (2021); Úrvalsdeild Playoffs MVP (2025); Icelandic Basketball Cup Finals MVP (2020); Úrvalsdeild Domestic Player of the Year (2025); Úrvalsdeild Defensive Player of the Year (2019); 4x Úrvalsdeild Domestic All-First team (2019, 2021, 2024, 2025); 1. deild karla Domestic All-First team (2009); 2x Úrvalsdeild karla assist leader (2011, 2019)

Ægir Þór Steinarsson (born 10 May 1991) is an Icelandic basketball player for Úrvalsdeild karla club Stjarnan and the Icelandic national team, where he participated at the EuroBasket 2015 and EuroBasket 2017. In 2025, he won the Icelandic championship for the first time and was named the Finals MVP.

== College ==
Ægir played with Newberry from 2011 to 2013.

== Career ==
Ægir started his career with Fjölnir and was named to the 1. deild karla Domestic All-First team in 2009. The following season, he was selected to the Icelandic All-Star game, when he also won the three-point contest, and again in 2011.

In September 2015, Ægir signed with KR of the Icelandic Úrvalsdeild karla. On 13 February 2016 he helped the team win the Icelandic Cup. Two weeks later, KR allowed Ægir out of his contract to sign with Spanish club Peñas Huesca of the LEB Oro.

In July 2016, Ægir signed with Miraflores In July 2017, he helped the club achieve promotion to Liga ACB.

On 17 July 2018, Ægir signed with Stjarnan of the Úrvalsdeild karla after rejecting an offer from KR.

On 17 February 2019, Ægir had 8 points and 8 assists in Stjarnan's 84–68 victory against Njarðvík in the Icelandic Cup finals.

After the Úrvalsdeild playoffs ended, Ægir signed with Regatas Corrientes of the Liga Nacional de Básquet for the rest of the season. On 5 June, Regatas lost to Instituto Atlético Central Córdoba in the fifth game of the best-of-five series in the quarter-finals of the LNB playoffs.

Stjarnan opened the 2019–20 season with an 89–77 win against reigning champions KR in the annual Icelandic Super Cup where Ægir posted 10 points and 6 assists. On 15 February 2020, Ægir was named the Icelandic Cup Finals MVP after scoring 19 points and handing out 14 assists in Stjarnan's 75–89 win against Grindavík in the Cup final.

For the 2020–21 regular season, Ægir averaged 16.0 points and 8.3 assists per game. In the playoffs, he averaged 21.7 points and 7.9 assists per game, helping Stjarnan to the semi-finals where they lost 2–3 to eventual champions Þór Þorlákshöfn.

In July 2021, Ægir signed with LEB Gold club Gipuzkoa Basket. On 26 September 2021, he won the Euskal Kopa with Gipuzkoa.

In July 2022, Ægir signed with CB Lucentum Alicante.

In June 2023, Ægir signed again with Stjarnan. On 21 May 2025, he led Stjarnan to its first national championship and was named the Finals MVP.

On 14 April 2026, Ægir broke his elbow in a playoff game against KR resulting in him missing the rest of the season.

== Career statistics ==
=== National team ===
Team	Tournament	Pos.	GP	PPG	RPG	APG
Iceland	EuroBasket 2015	24th	5	1.2	0.6	0.6
Iceland	EuroBasket 2017	24th	4	0.5	0.5	1.0
Iceland	EuroBasket 2025	22nd	5	3.4	1.6	3.6
