= Basketball at the 1989 Games of the Small States of Europe =

Basketball

- Venue: various
- Dates: 17-20 May

Basketball at the 1989 Games of the Small States of Europe was played in Cyprus between 17 and 20 May 1989.

== Men's tournament ==
=== Group A ===
Pos	Team	Pld	W	L	PF	PA	PD	Pts	Qualification	(Andorra)	(Iceland)	(Malta)
1	Andorra	2	2	0	164	143	+21	4	Final	—		
2	Iceland	2	1	1	173	166	+7	3	Bronze medal game	79–83	—	94–83
3	Malta	2	0	2	147	175	−28	2	Fifth position game	64–81		—

=== Group B ===
Pos	Team	Pld	W	L	PF	PA	PD	Pts		(Cyprus)	(Luxembourg)	(Monaco)	(San Marino)
1	Cyprus (H)	3	2	1	238	241	−3	5	Final	—	74–71		79–88
2	Luxembourg	3	2	1	0	0	0	5	Bronze medal game		—	W	
3	Monaco	3	1	2	0	0	0	4	Fifth position game	82–85		—	W
4	San Marino	3	1	2	0	0	0	4			L		—

(H) Hosts

=== Fifth position game ===
Monaco	101–103	Malta

=== Bronze medal game ===
Iceland	98–97	Luxembourg

=== Final ===
Andorra	54–52	Cyprus
