= Basketball at the 1993 Games of the Small States of Europe =

- Dates: 26-29 May

Basketball at the 1993 Games of the Small States of Europe was held in Malta between 26 and 29 May 1993. Iceland won the men's event and Luxembourg the women's event.

== Medal summary ==
| Event | Gold | Silver | Bronze |
|---|---|---|---|
| Men | Iceland | Cyprus | Luxembourg |
| Women | Luxembourg | Iceland | Malta |

== Men's tournament ==
Men's tournament was played with a round-robin group composed by six teams.

=== Table ===
| Pos | Team | Pld | W | L | PF | PA | PD | Pts | Qualification | (Iceland) | (Cyprus) | (Luxembourg) | (Andorra) | (San Marino) | (Malta) |
|---|---|---|---|---|---|---|---|---|---|---|---|---|---|---|---|
| 1 | Iceland (C) | 5 | 5 | 0 | 463 | 379 | +84 | 10 | Gold medal | — | 98–79 | | 87–78 | 85–81 | |
| 2 | Cyprus | 5 | 4 | 1 | 401 | 357 | +44 | 9 | Silver medal | | — | 68–63 | 89–55 | | 85–80 |
| 3 | Luxembourg | 5 | 2 | 3 | 366 | 408 | −42 | 7 | Bronze medal | 69–102 | | — | | 70–68 | |
| 4 | Andorra | 5 | 2 | 3 | 347 | 378 | −31 | 7 | | | | 74–81 | — | 73–59 | |
| 5 | San Marino | 5 | 1 | 4 | 348 | 380 | −32 | 6 | | | 61–80 | | | — | 79–72 |
| 6 | Malta (H) | 5 | 1 | 4 | 382 | 405 | −23 | 6 | | 72–91 | | 96–83 | 62–67 | | — |

(C) Champions; (H) Hosts

== Women's tournament ==
| Pos | Team | Pld | W | L | PF | PA | PD | Pts | Qualification | (Luxembourg) | (Iceland) | (Malta) | (Cyprus) |
|---|---|---|---|---|---|---|---|---|---|---|---|---|---|
| 1 | Luxembourg | 3 | 3 | 0 | 0 | 0 | 0 | 6 | Gold medal | — | 67–52 | 53–49 | |
| 2 | Iceland | 3 | 2 | 1 | 181 | 180 | +1 | 5 | Silver medal | | — | 65–59 | |
| 3 | Malta | 3 | 1 | 2 | 147 | 154 | −7 | 4 | Bronze medal | | | — | 39–36 |
| 4 | Cyprus | 3 | 0 | 3 | 0 | 0 | 0 | 3 | | L? | 54–64 | | — |
