= Basketball at the 1995 Games of the Small States of Europe =

- Dates: 30 May-3 June

Basketball at the 1995 Games of the Small States of Europe was held from 30 May to 3 June 1995 in Luxembourg. Cyprus won the gold medal in the men's event and the hosts Luxembourg in the women's event.

== Medal summary ==
Event	Gold	Silver	Bronze
Men	Cyprus	Luxembourg	Iceland
Women	Luxembourg	Iceland	Cyprus

== Men's tournament ==
=== Group A ===
Pos	Team	Pld	W	L	PF	PA	PD	Pts	Qualification	ISL	SMR	AND
1	Iceland	2	2	0	173	141	+32	4	Semifinals	—	90–62	
2	San Marino	2	1	1	133	153	−20	3	Semifinals		—	
3	Andorra	2	0	2	142	154	−12	2	Fifth position game	79–83	63–71	—

Source: FIBA

=== Group B ===
Pos	Team	Pld	W	L	PF	PA	PD	Pts	Qualification	CYP	LUX	MLT
1	Cyprus	2	2	0	159	143	+16	4	Semifinals	—		87–73
2	Luxembourg	2	1	1	153	145	+8	3	Semifinals	70–72	—	83–73
3	Malta	2	0	2	146	170	−24	2	Fifth position game			—

Source: FIBA

=== Final round ===
Semifinals
Iceland	86
Luxembourg	95
San Marino	51
Cyprus	87

Final
Cyprus	77
Luxembourg	75
Third place
Iceland	90
San Marino	83

=== Fifth position game ===
Andorra	85
Malta	90

== Women's tournament ==
Pos	Team	Pld	W	L	PF	PA	PD	Pts	Qualification	(Luxembourg)	(Iceland)	(Cyprus)	(Malta)
1	Luxembourg	3	3	0	0	0	0	6	Gold medal	—	81–64		W
2	Iceland	3	2	1	238	197	+41	5	Silver medal		—	100–62	74–54
3	Cyprus	4	1	3	0	0	0	5	Bronze medal	L		—	
4	Malta	3	0	3	0	0	0	3				L	—
