= Luxembourg men's national basketball team =

Men's national basketball team representing Luxembourg

Luxembourg
- FIBA ranking: 87 (1 September 2026)
- Joined FIBA: 1946
- FIBA zone: FIBA Europe
- National federation: Luxembourg Basketball Federation (FLBB)
- Coach: Ken Diederich

FIBA World Cup
- Appearances: None

EuroBasket
- Appearances: 3
- Medals: None

Championship for Small Countries
- Appearances: 5
- Medals: (silver) Silver: (1992, 2004); (bronze) Bronze: (1990)

Games of the Small States of Europe
- Appearances: 17
- Medals: (gold) Gold: (2023); (silver) Silver: (1985, 1991, 1995, 2007, 2009, 2013, 2019); (bronze) Bronze: (1993, 2003, 2005, 2015)
Home	Away

First international
- Poland 45–28 Luxembourg (Geneva, Switzerland; 30 April 1946)

Biggest win
- Luxembourg 99–44 San Marino (Serravalle, San Marino; 1 June 2017)

Biggest defeat
- Greece 119–46 Luxembourg (Vevey, Switzerland; 10 May 1980)

The Luxembourg men's national basketball team (Luxembourgish: Lëtzebuergesch Basketballnationalequipe, French: Équipe du Luxembourg de basketball, German: Luxemburgische Basketballnationalmannschaft) represents Luxembourg in international basketball tournaments. They are controlled by the Luxembourg Basketball Federation.

Luxembourg has competed at the EuroBasket three times, in 1946, 1951, and 1955. Their best result was an eighth place finish at their first appearance at the competition in 1946. However, the national team has yet to qualify to compete at the FIBA World Cup.

== History ==
=== EuroBasket 1946 ===
Luxembourg appeared in their first international event at EuroBasket 1946 in Geneva. After being placed in Group A for the preliminary round, the national team would play in their first ever match against Poland, where the team would lose 45–28. Following the defeat, Luxembourg went on to lose their next two matches against Hungary and Italy, which ultimately dropped the team into the classification phase of the tournament. There, Luxembourg captured their first ever victory against England 27–50. With only one game remaining for Luxembourg, the team would finish out the competition with a loss against Belgium, to end the tournament eighth out of the ten teams overall.

=== EuroBasket 1951 ===
After not entering the competition in 1947 and 1949, Luxembourg made their way back to the continental stage at EuroBasket 1951 in Paris. Luxembourg's first match of the tournament was against the host France, which resulted in a demoralising defeat for the national team 72–26. Ensuing the tough loss for Luxembourg, were four straight defeats for the team, to relegate them into a must win elimination game for the right to advance into the classification rounds. Luxembourg, however, would lose in a tightly contested match 45–46 against Denmark to be eliminated.

=== EuroBasket 1955 ===
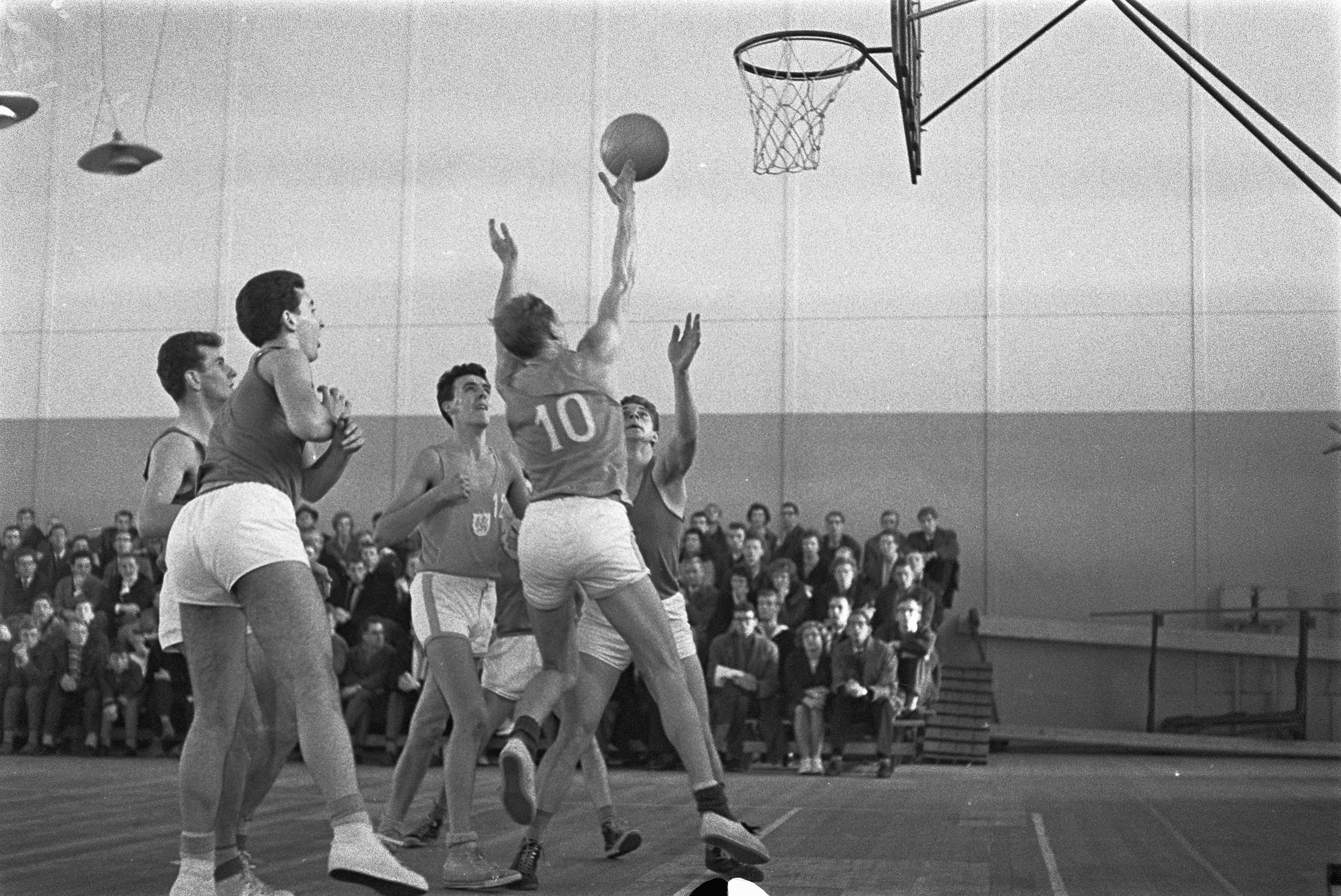
A match against Netherlands in 1959.

Following Luxembourg's dismal performance at the EuroBasket in 1951, the national team declined to enter the event in 1953, instead looked toward EuroBasket 1955 in Budapest to make amends. After a disastrous first game in the preliminary round, which saw Luxembourg completely dominated by the Soviet Union, the team was narrowly defeated in their second match against Sweden 54–53. However, in Luxembourg's final two matches of the preliminary phase, the team struggled to build upon their game against Sweden; and were relegated toward the classification rounds at a record of (0–5).

Entering the classification round, Luxembourg dropped their first match against Turkey, before earning their first win of the tournament against Denmark 46–31. Luxembourg would eventually go on to pick up two more victories, both against Sweden to end the tournament 15th out of the 18 teams at the event.

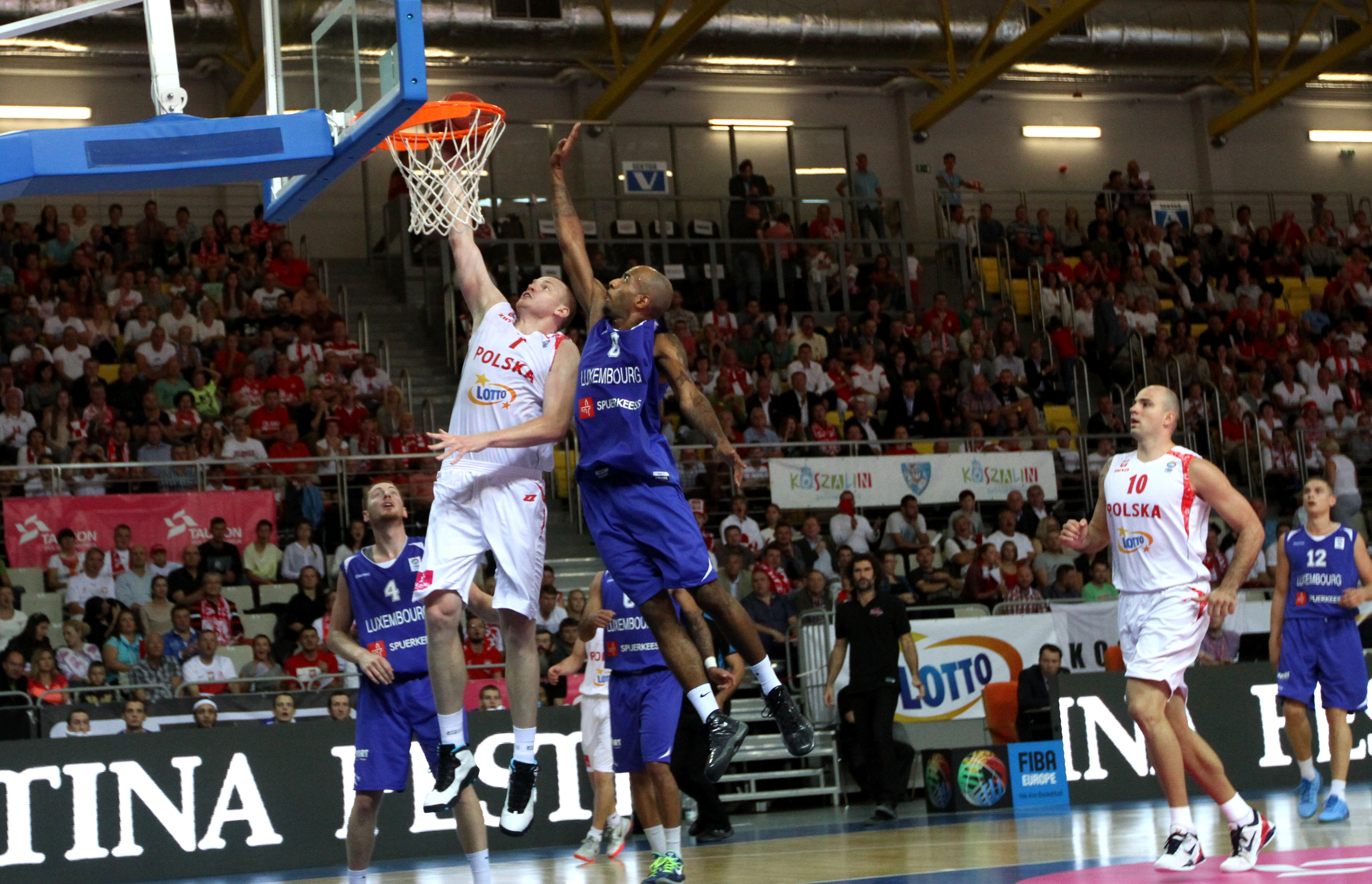
Poland v Luxembourg during a EuroBasket 2015 qualifier.

=== Subsequent years ===
After Luxembourg's last appearance at the EuroBasket in 1951, the national team endured numerous failed qualifying cycles in order to make it back to the EuroBasket. However, Luxembourg eventually achieved success competing at smaller competitions such as the European Championship for Small Countries and the Games of the Small States of Europe.

Entering qualification for Luxembourg to reach EuroBasket 2017, the team struggled toward a (1–5) record during the process to being eliminated. After Luxembourg's missed opportunity to qualify for the 2017 tournament, the team was tasked with going through Pre-Qualifiers with a chance to qualify for EuroBasket 2022. Luxembourg would get off to a slow start during the first round of pre-qualifiers, losing their first three matches before picking up a needed win on the road against Cyprus 89–76. With a record of (1–3), Luxembourg's path of advancing took a detour, as the team was relegated to the third and final phase of pre-qualifiers. There, Luxembourg would only win one game during that qualifying window (1–3), at home against Kosovo 88–80 and failing to advance.

For Luxembourg's process to qualify for the 2023 FIBA World Cup, the national team took part in European Pre-Qualifiers, where they went (2–4) in the first round; and were initially eliminated. Although due to Austria withdrawing from qualification, Luxembourg were next inline to replace them. Entering the second and final phase of World Cup European pre-qualifiers, Luxembourg's qualification campaign officially came to a close, after posting an (0–4) record during the round.

== Competitive record ==
=== FIBA World Cup ===
World Cup					Qualification		
Year	Position	Pld	W	L	Pld	W	L
(Argentina) 1950	Did not enter				Did not enter		
(Brazil) 1954	Did not enter				Did not enter		
(Chile) 1959	Did not enter				Did not enter		
(Brazil) 1963	Did not enter				Did not enter		
(Uruguay) 1967	Did not enter				Did not enter		
(Socialist Federal Republic of Yugoslavia) 1970	Did not enter				Did not enter		
(Puerto Rico) 1974	Did not enter				Did not enter		
(Philippines) 1978	Did not qualify				EuroBasket served as qualifiers		
(Colombia) 1982	Did not qualify				EuroBasket served as qualifiers		
(Spain) 1986	Did not enter				Did not enter		
(Argentina) 1990	Did not enter				Did not enter		
(Canada) 1994	Did not qualify				EuroBasket served as qualifiers		
(Greece) 1998	Did not qualify				EuroBasket served as qualifiers		
(United States) 2002	Did not qualify				EuroBasket served as qualifiers		
(Japan) 2006	Did not qualify				EuroBasket served as qualifiers		
(Turkey) 2010	Did not qualify				EuroBasket served as qualifiers		
(Spain) 2014	Did not qualify				EuroBasket served as qualifiers		
(China) 2019	Did not enter				Did not enter		
(Philippines) (Japan) (Indonesia) 2023	Did not qualify				10	2	8
(Qatar) 2027	Did not qualify				4	1	3
(France) 2031	To be determined				To be determined		
Total	0/20				14	3	11

=== Olympic Games ===
Olympic Games					Qualifying		
Year	Position	Pld	W	L	Pld	W	L
(Nazi Germany) 1936	No national representative						
(United Kingdom) 1948	Did not enter						
(Finland) 1952	Did not enter						
(Australia) 1956	Did not qualify						
(Italy) 1960	Did not enter				Did not enter		
(Japan) 1964	Did not qualify				7	0	7
(Mexico) 1968	Did not enter				Did not enter		
(West Germany) 1972	Did not enter				Did not enter		
(Canada) 1976	Did not enter				Did not enter		
(Soviet Union) 1980	Did not qualify				4	0	4
(United States) 1984	Did not enter				Did not enter		
(South Korea) 1988	Did not enter				Did not enter		
(Spain) 1992	Did not enter				Did not enter		
(United States) 1996	Did not qualify				Did not qualify		
(Australia) 2000	Did not qualify				Did not qualify		
(Greece) 2004	Did not qualify				Did not qualify		
(China) 2008	Did not qualify				Did not qualify		
(United Kingdom) 2012	Did not qualify				Did not qualify		
(Brazil) 2016	Did not qualify				Did not qualify		
(Japan) 2020	Did not qualify				Did not qualify		
(France) 2024	Did not qualify				Did not qualify		
(United States) 2028	Did not qualify				Did not qualify		
Total	0/21				11	0	11

=== Games of the Small States of Europe ===
Games of the Small States of Europe
Year	Position	Pld	W	L
(San Marino) 1985	2nd place, silver medalist(s)	3	2	1
(Monaco) 1987	6th	3	1	2
(Cyprus) 1989	4th	4	2	2
(Andorra) 1991	2nd place, silver medalist(s)	5	3	2
(Malta) 1993	3rd place, bronze medalist(s)	5	2	3
(Luxembourg) 1995	2nd place, silver medalist(s)	4	2	2
(Iceland) 1997	4th	4	1	3
(San Marino) 2001	5th	3	1	2
(Malta) 2003	3rd place, bronze medalist(s)	4	2	2
(Andorra) 2005	3rd place, bronze medalist(s)	4	2	2
(Monaco) 2007	2nd place, silver medalist(s)	5	4	1
(Cyprus) 2009	2nd place, silver medalist(s)	5	3	2
(Luxembourg) 2013	2nd place, silver medalist(s)	4	3	1
(Iceland) 2015	3rd place, bronze medalist(s)	3	1	2
(San Marino) 2017	4th	5	2	3
(Montenegro) 2019	2nd place, silver medalist(s)	5	3	2
(Malta) 2023	1st place, gold medalist(s)	5	4	1
Total		70	37	33

=== EuroBasket ===
EuroBasket					Qualification		
Year	Position	Pld	W	L	Pld	W	L
(Switzerland) 1935	No national representative						
(Latvia) 1937	No national representative						
(Lithuania) 1939	No national representative						
(Switzerland) 1946	8th	5	1	4			
(Czechoslovakia) 1947	Did not enter						
(Egypt) 1949	Did not enter						
(France) 1951	17th	5	0	5			
(Soviet Union) 1953	Did not enter						
(Hungary) 1955	15th	10	3	7			
(Bulgaria) 1957	Did not enter						
(Turkey) 1959	Did not enter						
(Socialist Federal Republic of Yugoslavia) 1961	Did not enter						
(Poland) 1963	Did not enter				Did not enter		
(Soviet Union) 1965	Did not qualify				3	1	2
(Finland) 1967	Did not qualify				3	0	3
(Italy) 1969	Did not enter				Did not enter		
(West Germany) 1971	Did not enter				Did not enter		
(Spain) 1973	Did not enter				Did not enter		
(Socialist Federal Republic of Yugoslavia) 1975	Did not qualify				5	0	5
(Belgium) 1977	Did not qualify				5	1	4
(Italy) 1979	Did not qualify				3	1	2
(Czechoslovakia) 1981	Did not enter				Did not enter		
(France) 1983	Did not enter				Did not enter		
(West Germany) 1985	Did not qualify				5	3	2
(Greece) 1987	Did not qualify				4	1	3
(Socialist Federal Republic of Yugoslavia) 1989	Did not enter				Did not enter		
(Italy) 1991	Did not enter				Did not enter		
(Germany) 1993	Did not qualify				6	0	6
(Greece) 1995	Did not qualify				6	0	6
(Spain) 1997	Did not qualify				5	1	4
(France) 1999	Did not qualify				5	1	4
(Turkey) 2001	Did not qualify				6	0	6
(Sweden) 2003	Did not qualify				11	1	10
(Serbia and Montenegro) 2005	Division B				6	0	6
(Spain) 2007	Division B				8	0	8
(Poland) 2009	Division B				8	0	8
(Lithuania) 2011	Division B				6	0	6
(Slovenia) 2013	Did not qualify				8	0	8
(France) (Croatia) (Germany) (Latvia) 2015	Did not qualify				12	0	12
(Finland) (Israel) (Romania) (Turkey) 2017	Did not qualify				6	1	5
(Czech Republic) (Georgia (country)) (Italy) (Germany) 2022	Did not qualify				8	2	6
(Cyprus) (Finland) (Poland) (Latvia) 2025	Did not qualify				8	1	7
(Estonia) (Greece) (Slovenia) (Spain) 2029	Qualification in progress				6	2	4
Total	3/39	20	4	16	143	16	127

=== Championship for Small Countries ===
FIBA European Championship for Small Countries
Year	Position	Pld	W	L
(Malta) 1988	4th	5	2	3
(Wales) 1990	3rd place, bronze medalist(s)	5	3	2
(Cyprus) 1992	2nd place, silver medalist(s)	5	3	2
(Republic of Ireland) 1994	4th	5	2	3
(Andorra) 2004	2nd place, silver medalist(s)	5	4	1
Total		25	14	11

== Results and fixtures ==
Win Loss

=== 2025 ===
20 February 2025 2027 FIBA World Cup pre-qualifiers – 1st round	Norway	68–59	Luxembourg	Oslo, Norway
19:00 (UTC+1)	Scoring by quarter: 15–21, 15–17, 22–8, 16–13
	Pts: Frey 27; Rebs: Ndow 9 Asts: Frey 4	Boxscore	Pts: Vujaković 12; Rebs: Rugg 11; Asts: four players 2	Arena: Nordstrand Arena; Attendance: 2,000; Referees: Joaquin García (ESP), Ritvars Helmšteins (LAT), Rainis Värv (EST)

27 November 2025 EuroBasket 2029 pre-qualifiers – 1st round	Luxembourg	89–77	Ireland	Luxembourg City, Luxembourg
19:30 (UTC+1)	Scoring by quarter: 26–11, 21–26, 17–24, 25–16
	Pts: Kovac 38; Rebs: Logelin, Rugg 6 Asts: Gutenkauf 6	Boxscore	Pts: Badmus 24; Rebs: Buivydas 10; Asts: Flood 6	Arena: d'Coque; Attendance: 1,200; Referees: Mehmet Karabilecen (TUR), Diogo Martins (POR), Karol Kowalski (POL)

30 November 2025 EuroBasket 2029 pre-qualifiers – 1st round	Azerbaijan	90–95	Luxembourg	Baku, Azerbaijan
18:00 (UTC+4)	Scoring by quarter: 18–25, 26–32, 17–25, 29–13
	Pts: Van Beck 29; Rebs: Van Beck 8 Asts: Van Beck 7	Boxscore	Pts: Kovac 29; Rebs: Kovac 9 Asts: Kovac 5	Arena: Baku Sports Palace; Attendance: 1,235; Referees: Nemanja Ninković (SRB), Ciprian Stoica (ROU), Aleksandar Radonjić (AUT)

=== 2026 ===
27 February 2025 EuroBasket 2029 pre-qualifiers – 1st round	North Macedonia	79–70	Luxembourg	Skopje, North Macedonia
18:00 (UTC+1)	Scoring by quarter: 25–17, 19–15, 15–17, 20–21
	Pts: Jakimovski 17; Rebs: Happ 14; Asts: Petkov 7	Boxscore	Pts: Kovac 20; Rebs: Kovac 11; Asts: Gutenkauf 4	Arena: Skopje City Park Sports Hall; Attendance: 1,500; Referees: Peter Ženiš (SVK), Duhan Köyiçi (TUR), Mladen Lučić (MNE)

2 March 2026 EuroBasket 2029 pre-qualifiers – 1st round	Ireland	91–85	Luxembourg	Dublin, Ireland
19:30 (UTC+0)	Scoring by quarter: 22–23, 17–12, 26–21, 26–29
	Pts: N. Quinn 22; Rebs: N. Quinn 14; Asts: Fulton 12	Boxscore	Pts: Rugg 23; Rebs: Rugg 11; Asts: Gutenkauf 6	Arena: National Basketball Arena; Attendance: 2,000; Referees: Viktor Nagy (HUN), Pierre Landy (FRA), José Pedroso (POR)

2 July 2026 EuroBasket 2029 pre-qualifiers – 1st round	Luxembourg	74–76	Azerbaijan	Luxembourg City, Luxembourg
19:00 (UTC+2)	Scoring by quarter: 18–22, 24–17, 13–18, 19–19
	Pts: Kovac 15; Rebs: Kovac 8 Asts: Kovac 4	Boxscore	Pts: K. Mammadov 19; Rebs: Aydın 12; Asts: K. Mammadov 3	Arena: d'Coque; Attendance: 1,200; Referees: Jan Baloun (CZE), Nemanja Vlahović (SRB), Jules Gaduel (FRA)

5 July 2026 EuroBasket 2029 pre-qualifiers – 1st round	Luxembourg	66–80	North Macedonia	Luxembourg City, Luxembourg
16:00 (UTC+2)	Scoring by quarter: 15–23, 12–23, 22–17, 17–17
	Pts: Kovac 17; Rebs: Grosber 9 Asts: Gutenkauf, Kovac 4	Boxscore	Pts: Sestina 18; Rebs: Gjuroski, Tashovski 7 Asts: Tashovski 7	Arena: d'Coque; Attendance: 2,000; Referees: Peter Ženiš (SVK), Diogo Martins (POR), Matteo Lucotti (ITA)

== Team ==
=== Current roster ===
Roster for the EuroBasket 2029 Pre-Qualifiers matches on 2 and 5 July 2026 against Azerbaijan and North Macedonia.

Luxembourg men's national basketball team roster
Players
Coaches

Pos.	No.	Name	Age – Date of birth	Height	Club	Ctr.
SG	1	Malcolm Kreps	24 – 11 October 2001	1.93 m (6 ft 4 in)	Okapi Aalst	(Belgium)
SG	2	Edson de Sousa	19 – 15 December 2006	1.92 m (6 ft 4 in)	Arantia Larochette	(Luxembourg)
PF	3	Dino Ceman	23 – 29 September 2002	1.98 m (6 ft 6 in)	T71 Dudelange	(Luxembourg)
PG	6	Max Logelin	23 – 17 June 2003	1.85 m (6 ft 1 in)	Sparta	(Luxembourg)
PG	7	Philippe Gutenkauf	31 – 11 April 1995	1.86 m (6 ft 1 in)	Etzella	(Luxembourg)
G	8	Dorian Grosber	20 – 15 May 2006	1.98 m (6 ft 6 in)	Northeastern	(United States)
F	11	Alex Laurent (C)	33 – 6 June 1993	1.98 m (6 ft 6 in)	Amicale	(Luxembourg)
SF	13	Ben Kovac	26 – 22 February 2000	1.95 m (6 ft 5 in)	Évreux	(France)
C	14	David Rocha	25 – 22 March 2001	2.03 m (6 ft 8 in)	Mambra	(Luxembourg)
G/F	25	Konan Oth	19 – 2 June 2007	1.91 m (6 ft 3 in)	Musel Pikes	(Luxembourg)
G/F	27	Yannick Verbeelen	27 – 3 November 1998	1.90 m (6 ft 3 in)	Sparta	(Luxembourg)
F/C	31	Clancy Rugg	34 – 22 September 1991	2.03 m (6 ft 8 in)	Esch	(Luxembourg)
SF	77	Ivor Kuresevic	28 – 2 May 1998	1.95 m (6 ft 5 in)	Amicale	(Luxembourg)

Head coach

- (Luxembourg) Ken Diederich

Assistant coach(es)

- (Croatia) Denis Toroman
- (Luxembourg) Christophe Toussaint

Legend

- (C) Team captain
- Club – describes last
  club before the competition
- Age – describes age
  on 2 July 2026

=== Depth chart ===
Pos.	Starting 5	Bench 1	Bench 2
C	Clancy Rugg	David Rocha
PF	Alex Laurent	Dino Ceman
SF	Ben Kovac	Yannick Verbeelen	Ivor Kuresevic
SG	Malcolm Kreps	Dorian Grosber	Konan Oth
PG	Philippe Gutenkauf	Max Logelin

== Head coach position ==
- (Hungary) Ferenc Haris – (1989–1991)
- (United States) Rick Brooks – (1991–1993)
- (United States) Doug Marty – (1993–1996)
- (United States) Steve Hebold – (1996–2002)
- (United States) Don Beck – (2002)
- (United States) Paul Brown – (2002–2003)
- (Germany) Hermann Paar – (2003–2005)
- (Croatia) Krešimir Bašić – (2005–2007)
- (Germany) Carsten Steiner – (2008–2009)
- (Germany) Frank Baum – (2010–2013)
- (Germany) Karsten Schul – (2013–2014)
- (France) Franck Mériguet – (2014–2015)
- (Luxembourg) Ken Diederich – (2015–present)

== Past rosters ==
1946 EuroBasket: finished 8th among 10 teams

3 Alfred Achen, 4 René Bicheler, 5 René Colling, 6 Henri Heyart, 7 Pierre Kelsen, 8 Eugene Kohn, 9 Léon Konsbruck, 10 Joseph Linck, 11 Gaston Poncin, 12 Roger Scheuren (Coach: Henri Heyart)

1951 EuroBasket: finished 17th among 18 teams

3 Guy Neumann, 4 Mathias Steffen, 5 Xander Frantz, 6 Fernand Schmalen, 7 Roger Dentzer, 8 Joseph Eyschen, 9 Marcel Gales, 10 Mathias Birel, 11 Jean Guillen, 12 Pierre Steinmetz, 13 Léon Konsbruck, 14 René Haas, 15 Ley, 25 Paul Linster (Coach: Pierrot Conter)

1955 EuroBasket: finished 15th among 18 teams

3 Pierre Steinmetz, 4 Mathias Birel, 5 Fernand Wolter, 6 Joseph Lettal, 7 Paul Kemp, 8 Fernand Schmalen, 9 John Kieffer, 10 Marcel Simon, 11 Florent Lickes, 12 Gust Scharle, 13 Albert Meyers, 14 Jean Christophory (Coach: Pierre Kelsen)

== See also ==
- Sport in Luxembourg
- Luxembourg women's national basketball team
- Luxembourg men's national under-20 basketball team
- Luxembourg men's national under-18 basketball team
- Luxembourg men's national under-16 basketball team
