= EuroBasket 2025 qualification =

International basketball event

Tournament details
- Dates: 25 November 2021 – 24 February 2025
- Teams: 40

Official website
- Qualifiers website Pre-qualifiers website

The EuroBasket 2025 qualification was a basketball competition that was played from November 2021 to February 2025, to determine the 20 FIBA Europe member nations who would join the automatically qualified co-hosts Cyprus, Finland, Poland and Latvia at the EuroBasket 2025 finals tournament.

== Format changes ==
Similar, as for the previous edition, the format involved pre-qualifiers and qualifiers. The pre-qualifiers first round comprised teams that did not play in the 2023 FIBA World Cup qualifiers. Due to the 2022 Russian invasion of Ukraine, FIBA changed the qualification system during the pre-qualifiers first round.

=== Old format ===
The pre-qualifiers first round was played by ten teams: Eight eliminated in the 2023 FIBA Basketball World Cup pre-qualifiers, and two teams who did not apply to enter in those qualifiers. They were divided into three groups: two groups of three teams and one group with four teams. The winner of each group and the best runner-up team would qualified for the second round. The pre-qualifiers second round was played by twelve teams: Eight eliminated in the 2023 FIBA Basketball World Cup qualifiers first round, and four teams that advanced from the first round. They were divided into four groups by three teams with the group winners advancing to the Qualifiers. The pre-qualifiers third round was played by all remaining teams from the first and the second round which failed to advance to the qualifiers. They competed for the four last places in the qualifiers.

=== New format ===
The pre-qualifiers first round continued playing in the original format since the decision about a competition system change was taken during its progress. In the meanwhile, Cyprus was announced as one of the tournament hosts, while Russia and Belarus were expelled from all FIBA competitions, which implied few format changes. Instead of originally four teams, now six teams advanced from the pre-qualifiers first round to the second round: three group winners, two best runners-up and Cyprus as host nation, regardless of their result. The pre-qualifiers second round was played by twelve teams: Six (instead of original eight following exclusion of Russia and Belarus) eliminated in the 2023 FIBA Basketball World Cup Qualifiers first round, and six teams advancing from the first round. Unlike the initial format, they were divided into three groups by four teams with the group winners and Cyprus advancing to the qualifiers. The pre-qualifiers third round was played by all other teams from the first two rounds without any changes.

Qualifiers were played by 32 teams: 24 teams competing at the second round of 2023 FIBA World Cup qualifiers joined by eight teams advanced from Pre-Qualifiers.

== Pre-Qualifiers ==
The EuroBasket 2025 Pre-Qualifiers was played over three rounds. The best eight teams advanced to the EuroBasket 2025 Qualifiers.

=== First round ===
The pre-qualifiers first round was played in three windows: 25–28 November 2021; 24–27 February and 30 June – 3 July 2022.

The winner of each group, the two best runners-up team and Cyprus as a host nation qualified for the second round. All other teams were transferred to the third round.

==== Draw ====
The draw was made on 20 August 2021.

===== Seeding =====
The seeding was based on the FIBA World Rankings of 9 August 2021.

Seed 1
Team	Pos
Romania	54
Denmark	55
Switzerland	60

Seed 2
Team	Pos
Austria	61
Kosovo	70
Luxembourg	74

Seed 3
Team	Pos
Cyprus	79
Norway	89
Albania	105

Seed 4
Team	Pos
Ireland	107

==== Groups ====
All times are local.

===== Group A =====
Pos	Team	Pld	W	L	PF	PA	PD	Pts	Qualification
1	Austria	6	5	1	494	406	+88	11	Second round
2	Switzerland	6	4	2	444	409	+35	10	Second round
3	Ireland	6	2	4	454	508	−54	8	Third round
4	Cyprus	6	1	5	388	457	−69	7	Second round as host

Source: FIBA
Rules for classification: 1) Points; 2) Head-to-head; 3) Points difference; 4) Points scored.

25 November 2021	Cyprus	73–81	Ireland	Nicosia
19:00	Scoring by quarter: 17–20, 14–24, 19–22, 23–15
	Pts: Giannaras 16; Rebs: Koumis 8 Asts: Michail 5	Boxscore	Pts: Blount 21; Rebs: Carroll 12; Asts: Hosford 7	Arena: Eleftheria Indoor Hall; Attendance: 1,000; Referees: Ofer Manheim (ISR), Ilya Putenko (RUS), Zoran Mitrovski (MKD)

25 November 2021	Austria	80–64	Switzerland	Schwechat
20:15	Scoring by quarter: 18–15, 26–14, 21–20, 15–15
	Pts: Vujošević 20; Rebs: Mbemba 12; Asts: Vujošević 6	Boxscore	Pts: Kovac 13; Rebs: Cotture 8 Asts: Cotture 6	Arena: Multiversum; Attendance: 0 Referees: Blaž Zupančič (SLO), Nikola Perlić (CRO), Jan Baloun (CZE)

28 November 2021	Switzerland	66–43	Cyprus	Fribourg
17:00	Scoring by quarter: 21–11, 20–20, 11–4, 14–8
	Pts: Kovac 16; Rebs: Fofana, Jurkovitz 7 Asts: Cotture, Jurkovitz 3	Boxscore	Pts: four players 6 Rebs: Mantovani 6 Asts: Michail 2	Arena: Fondation Sportif Saint Leonard; Attendance: 1,725; Referees: Ciprian Stoica (ROU), Franko Gracin (CRO), Alberto Sánchez (ESP)

28 November 2021	Ireland	70–97	Austria	Dublin
17:00	Scoring by quarter: 13–28, 28–15, 9–30, 20–24
	Pts: Carroll 23; Rebs: Carroll 9 Asts: Flood 4	Boxscore	Pts: Klepeisz 25; Rebs: Poljak 8 Asts: Vujošević 8	Arena: National Basketball Arena; Attendance: 700; Referees: Francisco Araña (ESP), Nikola Bejat (NOR), Łukasz Jankowski (POL)

24 February 2022	Cyprus	77–86	Austria	Nicosia
19:00	Scoring by quarter: 15–22, 19–25, 17–21, 26–18
	Pts: Simitzis 20; Rebs: Panteli 8 Asts: Panteli 5	Boxscore	Pts: Vujošević 21; Rebs: Rados 7 Asts: Klepeisz 6	Arena: Eleftheria Indoor Hall; Attendance: 300; Referees: Sergey Mikhaylov (RUS), Nemanja Ninković (SRB), Nir Meirson (ISR)

24 February 2022	Switzerland	83–72	Ireland	Fribourg
19:30	Scoring by quarter: 28–14, 13–23, 20–15, 22–20
	Pts: Mlađan 24; Rebs: Jurkovitz 10; Asts: Zinn 10	Boxscore	Pts: Badmus 20; Rebs: Blount 9 Asts: Flood 5	Arena: Fondation Sportif Saint Leonard; Attendance: 768; Referees: Alfred Jovović (CRO), Anastasios Kardaris (GRE), Javier Torres (ESP)

27 February 2022	Switzerland	80–61	Austria	Fribourg
16:00	Scoring by quarter: 23–18, 17–18, 26–7, 14–18
	Pts: Kovac 18; Rebs: Jurkovitz 7 Asts: Cotture 5	Boxscore	Pts: Murati 14; Rebs: Ogunsipe 6 Asts: Klepeisz 3	Arena: Fondation Sportif Saint Leonard; Attendance: 1,417; Referees: Petros Papapetrou (GRE), Ofer Manheim (ISR), Alessandro Perciavalle (ITA)

27 February 2022	Ireland	83–75(OT)	Cyprus	Dublin
17:00	Scoring by quarter: 15–15, 23–11, 10–21, 16–17, Overtime: 19–11
	Pts: Carroll 17; Rebs: Badmus 12; Asts: Flood 6	Boxscore	Pts: Iliadis 14; Rebs: three players 6 Asts: three players 2	Arena: National Basketball Arena; Attendance: 1,000; Referees: Viola Györgyi (NOR), Alexandre Maret (FRA), Simon Unsworth (GBR)

30 June 2022	Austria	92–66	Ireland	Salzburg
20:20	Scoring by quarter: 23–22, 28–13, 20–15, 21–16
	Pts: Pöltl 14; Rebs: Pöltl 11; Asts: Klepeisz 6	Boxscore	Pts: Badmus 15; Rebs: Badmus 7 Asts: Fulton, Hanley 3	Arena: Sporthalle Alpenstraße; Attendance: 1,200; Referees: Zoran Mitrovski (MKD), Emmouil Tsolokas (GRE), Pavel Fúska (SVK)

30 June 2022	Cyprus	71–63	Switzerland	Nicosia
21:00	Scoring by quarter: 22–21, 21–19, 11–6, 17–17
	Pts: Stylianou 14; Rebs: Mantovani 7 Asts: three players 3	Boxscore	Pts: Kazadi, Nzege 17; Rebs: Mbala 12; Asts: Kazadi 8	Arena: Eleftheria Indoor Hall; Attendance: 800; Referees: Mart Uuehendrik (EST), Jan Baloun (CZE), Ofer Mannheim (ISR)

3 July 2022	Ireland	82–88	Switzerland	Dublin
17:15	Scoring by quarter: 25–25, 22–20, 18–30, 17–13
	Pts: Badmus 26; Rebs: Igiehon 7 Asts: Flood 4	Boxscore	Pts: Kovac 22; Rebs: Kazadi 8 Asts: Kazadi 9	Arena: National Basketball Arena; Attendance: 1,300; Referees: Ciprian Stoica (ROU), Alberto Sánchez (ESP), Stylianos Simeonidis (GRE)

3 July 2022	Austria	78–49	Cyprus	Salzburg
18:00	Scoring by quarter: 19–15, 18–5, 21–15, 20–14
	Pts: Lohr, Poljak 11; Rebs: Pöltl 18; Asts: Kaferle 7	Boxscore	Pts: Simitzis 14; Rebs: Stylianou 7 Asts: Tigkas 4	Arena: Sporthalle Alpenstraße; Attendance: 1,500; Referees: Sergii Zashchuk (UKR), Francisco Araña (ESP), Alin Faur (ROU)

===== Group B =====
Pos	Team	Pld	W	L	PF	PA	PD	Pts	Qualification
1	Romania	4	4	0	328	283	+45	8	Second round
2	Luxembourg	4	1	3	312	318	−6	5 (Note: Luxembourg 175–167 Albania)	Third round
3	Albania	4	1	3	313	352	−39	5	Third round

Source: FIBA
Rules for classification: 1) Points; 2) Head-to-head; 3) Points difference; 4) Points scored.
Notes:

25 November 2021	Albania	92–89	Luxembourg	Durrës
18:00	Scoring by quarter: 27–26, 21–20, 20–28, 24–15
	Pts: Pullazi 23; Rebs: Lekndreaj 9 Asts: Shestani 4	Boxscore	Pts: Rugg 25; Rebs: Rugg 7 Asts: Grün 8	Arena: Dhimitraq Goga Sports Palace; Attendance: 300; Referees: Goran Šljivić (AUT), Can Mavisu (TUR), Anastasios Kardaris (GRE)

28 November 2021	Luxembourg	70–73	Romania	Luxembourg City
17:00	Scoring by quarter: 25–15, 15–29, 18–14, 12–15
	Pts: Laurent 19; Rebs: Kovac, Laurent 7 Asts: Grün 7	Boxscore	Pts: Richard 16; Rebs: Cățe 8 Asts: Gheorghe 5	Arena: d'Coque; Attendance: 1,113; Referees: Nemanja Ninković (SRB), Alessandro Perciavalle (ITA), Alexandre Maret (FRA)

24 February 2022	Romania	101–84	Albania	Ploiești
18:00	Scoring by quarter: 28–29, 24–27, 25–14, 24–14
	Pts: Richard, Torok 16; Rebs: Cățe 10; Asts: Richard, Tohătan 7	Boxscore	Pts: Dusha 20; Rebs: Hysenagolli 8 Asts: Lekndreaj, Moore 3	Arena: Olimpia Sports Hall; Attendance: 750; Referees: Ilya Putenko (RUS), Ali Şakacı (TUR), Milosav Kaluđerović (MNE)

27 February 2022	Luxembourg	86–75	Albania	Luxembourg City
17:00	Scoring by quarter: 21–26, 27–15, 21–14, 17–20
	Pts: Rugg 33; Rebs: Rugg 13; Asts: Melcher 9	Boxscore	Pts: Moore 18; Rebs: Hysenagolli 8 Asts: three players 3	Arena: d'Coque; Attendance: 1,617; Referees: Francisco Araña (ESP), Nikola Bejat (NOR), Bert van Slooten (NED)

30 June 2022	Romania	78–67	Luxembourg	Timișoara
18:00	Scoring by quarter: 12–15, 19–16, 21–15, 16–21
	Pts: Torok 21; Rebs: Cățe 10; Asts: Tohătan 8	Boxscore	Pts: Rugg 29; Rebs: Rugg 9 Asts: Grün 4	Arena: Constantin Jude Sports Hall; Attendance: 1,500; Referees: Sergii Zashchuk (UKR), Anastasios Kardaris (GRE), Nir Meirson (ISR)

3 July 2022	Albania	62–76	Romania	Durrës
20:30	Scoring by quarter: 18–21, 20–20, 8–15, 16–20
	Pts: Taflaj 12; Rebs: Hamati, Pullazi 7 Asts: Hysa 4	Boxscore	Pts: Olah 22; Rebs: Torok 9 Asts: Tohătan 11	Arena: Dhimitraq Goga Sports Palace; Attendance: 300; Referees: Petros Papapetrou (GRE), Mladen Lučić (MNE), Hrvoje Čavar (BIH)

===== Group C =====
Pos	Team	Pld	W	L	PF	PA	PD	Pts	Qualification
1	Denmark	4	3	1	326	279	+47	7	Second round
2	Norway	4	2	2	311	317	−6	6	Second round
3	Kosovo	4	1	3	318	359	−41	5	Third round

Source: FIBA
Rules for classification: 1) Points; 2) Head-to-head; 3) Points difference; 4) Points scored.

25 November 2021	Norway	86–77	Kosovo	Bergen
19:00	Scoring by quarter: 17–22, 25–11, 27–19, 17–25
	Pts: Ndow 21; Rebs: Ndow 8 Asts: Jawara 7	Boxscore	Pts: Berisha 18; Rebs: Berisha 7 Asts: Berisha 4	Arena: Haukelandshallen; Attendance: 2,143; Referees: Vilius Mačiulaitis (LTU), Mart Uuehendrik (EST), James Dominique (GIB)

28 November 2021	Kosovo	78–73	Denmark	Pristina
19:00	Scoring by quarter: 18–17, 20–16, 22–13, 18–27
	Pts: Berisha 16; Rebs: three players 5 Asts: Berisha 5	Boxscore	Pts: Mortensen 24; Rebs: Midtgaard 10; Asts: three players 4	Arena: Palace of Youth and Sports; Attendance: 550; Referees: Petros Papapetrou (GRE), Ali Şakacı (TUR), Pavel Fúska (SVK)

24 February 2022	Denmark	84–68	Norway	Næstved
19:00	Scoring by quarter: 18–17, 20–17, 25–20, 21–14
	Pts: Klussmann, Bergstedt 13; Rebs: Bergstedt 11; Asts: Bergstedt 4	Boxscore	Pts: Frey 23; Rebs: Jawara 10; Asts: Jawara 5	Arena: Næstved Arena; Attendance: 0 Referees: Marko Vučković (SLO), Łukasz Jankowski (POL), Alberto Sánchez (ESP)

27 February 2022	Kosovo	92–95(OT)	Norway	Mitrovica
19:00	Scoring by quarter: 27–15, 19–16, 18–25, 17–25, Overtime: 11–14
	Pts: Berisha 27; Rebs: Bamforth 8 Asts: Bamforth 5	Boxscore	Pts: Frey 38; Rebs: Ndow 10; Asts: Jawara 4	Arena: Minatori Sports Hall; Attendance: 1,500; Referees: Ciprian Stoica (ROU), Zoran Mitrovski (MKD), Stylianos Simeonidis (GRE)

30 June 2022	Denmark	105–71	Kosovo	Næstved
19:00	Scoring by quarter: 26–19, 20–17, 30–17, 29–18
	Pts: Larsen 20; Rebs: Larsen 10; Asts: Mortensen 6	Boxscore	Pts: Berisha, Hajrizi 17; Rebs: Morina, Ukaj 7 Asts: Berisha 7	Arena: Næstved Arena; Attendance: 1,180; Referees: Gintaras Vitkauskas (LTU), Javier Torres (ESP), Alexandre Maret (FRA)

3 July 2022	Norway	62–64	Denmark	Oslo
18:00	Scoring by quarter: 13–14, 9–24, 12–14, 28–12
	Pts: Frey 16; Rebs: Berg, Dolven 7 Asts: Jawara 8	Boxscore	Pts: Bergstedt 19; Rebs: Bergstedt 11; Asts: Bergstedt 4	Arena: Nye Jordal Amfi; Attendance: 4,350; Referees: Vilius Mačiulaitis (LTU), Zdenko Tomašovič (SVK), Andrea Bongiorni (ITA)

==== Ranking of second-placed teams ====
Matches against the fourth-placed team in Group A are not included in this ranking.

Pos	Grp	Team	Pld	W	L	PF	PA	PD	Pts	Qualification
1	A	Switzerland	4	3	1	315	295	+20	7	Second round
2	C	Norway	4	2	2	311	317	−6	6	Second round
3	B	Luxembourg	4	1	3	312	318	−6	5	Third round

Source: FIBA
Rules for classification: 1) Points; 2) Head-to-head; 3) Points difference; 4) Points scored.

=== Second round ===
The pre-qualifiers second round was played in three windows: August 2022, November 2022 and February 2023.

The twelve teams were drawn into three groups by four teams. The winner of each group along with the tournament host Cyprus advanced to the Qualifiers. All other teams were transferred to the third round.

==== Draw ====
The draw was made on 14 July 2022.

===== Teams =====
Entrance/qualification method	Team(s)
Host nation	Cyprus
Advanced from First round	Austria; Denmark; Romania; Switzerland; Norway
Eliminated from 2023 World Cup qualification first round	Bulgaria; Croatia; North Macedonia; Poland; Portugal; Slovakia

==== Groups ====
All times are local.

===== Group D =====
Pos	Team	Pld	W	L	PF	PA	PD	Pts	Qualification
1	North Macedonia	6	5	1	436	375	+61	11	Qualifiers
2	Slovakia	6	4	2	439	436	+3	10	Third round
3	Norway	6	2	4	380	417	−37	8	Third round
4	Denmark	6	1	5	426	453	−27	7	Third round

Source: FIBA
Rules for classification: 1) Points; 2) Head-to-head; 3) Points difference; 4) Points scored.

25 August 2022	Slovakia	68–87	Norway	Levice
18:00	Scoring by quarter: 20–21, 13–21, 23–24, 12–21
	Pts: Jones 17; Rebs: Körner 5 Asts: Ihring 8	Boxscore	Pts: Frey 37; Rebs: Berg 10; Asts: Jawara 9	Arena: Športová hala Levice; Attendance: 821; Referees: Mehmet Şahin (TUR), Franko Gracin (CRO), Nemanja Ninković (SRB)

25 August 2022	Denmark	70–73	North Macedonia	Næstved
19:00	Scoring by quarter: 18–14, 11–20, 26–21, 15–18
	Pts: Jukić 20; Rebs: Lundberg 9 Asts: Lundberg 4	Boxscore	Pts: Dimitrijević 29; Rebs: Maslinko 5 Asts: Dimitrijević 4	Arena: Næstved Arena; Attendance: 1,418; Referees: Tanel Suslov (EST), Can Mavisu (TUR), Francisco Araña (ESP)

28 August 2022	Norway	99–75	Denmark	Bergen
18:00	Scoring by quarter: 34–21, 23–23, 26–21, 16–10
	Pts: Frey 26; Rebs: Jawara 7 Asts: Jawara 6	Boxscore	Pts: Lundberg 16; Rebs: Larsen 9 Asts: Lundberg 7	Arena: Haukelandshallen; Attendance: 2,250; Referees: Mihkel Männiste (EST), Mart Uuehendrik (EST), Davíð Tómasson (ISL)

28 August 2022	North Macedonia	79–75	Slovakia	Skopje
19:00	Scoring by quarter: 19–26, 21–20, 19–17, 20–12
	Pts: Dimitrijević 20; Rebs: Jakimovski 5 Asts: Dimitrijević 7	Boxscore	Pts: Mokráň 18; Rebs: Mokráň 11; Asts: Ihring, Krajčovič 6	Arena: SRC Kale; Attendance: 1,900; Referees: Ciprian Stoica (ROU), Özlem Yalman (TUR), Alexandre Deman (FRA)

10 November 2022	Slovakia	74–70	Denmark	Levice
18:00	Scoring by quarter: 23–17, 16–18, 18–11, 17–24
	Pts: Ihring 16; Rebs: Krajčovič 11; Asts: Ihring 12	Boxscore	Pts: Jukić 21; Rebs: Bergstedt 13; Asts: Darbo 6	Arena: Športová hala Levice; Attendance: 800; Referees: Josip Jurčević (CRO), Ariadna Chueca (ESP), Siniša Prpa (SRB)

10 November 2022	North Macedonia	58–36	Norway	Gevgelija
19:00	Scoring by quarter: 16–11, 18–7, 11–11, 13–7
	Pts: Krstevski, Stojanovski 14; Rebs: Krstevski 10; Asts: Shorts 8	Boxscore	Pts: Frey, Jawara 11; Rebs: Berg 7 Asts: Frey 3	Arena: Sports Hall "26th April"; Attendance: 1,000; Referees: Łukasz Jankowski (POL), Valentin Oliot (FRA), Jan Baloun (CZE)

13 November 2022	Norway	56–68	Slovakia	Bergen
18:00	Scoring by quarter: 20–16, 13–20, 13–14, 10–18
	Pts: Ndow 17; Rebs: Berg 10; Asts: Frey 5	Boxscore	Pts: Brodziansky 20; Rebs: Mokráň 12; Asts: Krajčovič 5	Arena: Haukelandshallen; Attendance: 2,053; Referees: Gintaras Vitkauskas (LTU), Alberto Sánchez (ESP), Blaž Zupančič (SLO)

13 November 2022	North Macedonia	74–71(OT)	Denmark	Gevgelija
19:00	Scoring by quarter: 14–20, 18–17, 16–17, 16–10, Overtime: 10–7
	Pts: Shorts 33; Rebs: Gjuroski 6 Asts: Shorts 6	Boxscore	Pts: Darbo 21; Rebs: Bergstedt 13; Asts: Darbo 10	Arena: Sports Hall "26th April"; Attendance: 1,900; Referees: Petros Papapetrou (GRE), Geert Jacobs (BEL), Alin Faur (ROU)

23 February 2023	Slovakia	82–73	North Macedonia	Levice
18:00	Scoring by quarter: 22–15, 22–23, 17–8, 21–27
	Pts: Krajčovič 23; Rebs: Malovec 13; Asts: Krajčovič 6	Boxscore	Pts: Shorts 23; Rebs: Krstevski, Maslinko 5 Asts: Shorts 6	Arena: Športová hala Levice; Attendance: 1,050; Referees: Ventsislav Velikov (BUL), Mehmet Şahin (TUR), Mart Uuehendrik (EST)

23 February 2023	Denmark	69–61	Norway	Næstved
19:00	Scoring by quarter: 21–15, 18–14, 12–16, 18–16
	Pts: Åris, Midtgaard 13; Rebs: Åris 7 Asts: Darboe 6	Boxscore	Pts: Frey 24; Rebs: Ndow 6 Asts: Jawara 6	Arena: Næstved Arena; Attendance: 0 Referees: Radomir Vojinović (MNE), Sergio Rodríguez (ESP), Özlem Yalman (TUR)

26 February 2023	Denmark	71–72	Slovakia	Næstved
15:30	Scoring by quarter: 21–12, 14–21, 14–26, 22–13
	Pts: Jukić 21; Rebs: Bergstedt 15; Asts: Darbo 4	Boxscore	Pts: Brodziansky 29; Rebs: Fusek 8 Asts: Krajčovič 5	Arena: Næstved Arena; Attendance: 1,334; Referees: Franko Gracin (CRO), Zdravko Rutešić (MNE), Nemanja Ninković (SRB)

26 February 2023	Norway	41–79	North Macedonia	Oslo
18:00	Scoring by quarter: 12–24, 14–21, 10–15, 5–19
	Pts: Frey 10; Rebs: Jawara, Ndow 5 Asts: Jawara 4	Boxscore	Pts: Shorts 22; Rebs: Shorts 6 Asts: Shorts 5	Arena: Nordstrand Arena; Attendance: 2,500; Referees: Ciprian Stoica (ROU), Can Mavisu (TUR), Javier Torres (ESP)

===== Group E =====
Pos	Team	Pld	W	L	PF	PA	PD	Pts	Qualification
1	Poland	6	5	1	493	412	+81	11 (Note: Poland 156–151 Croatia)	Qualifiers as host
2	Croatia	6	5	1	483	414	+69	11	Third round
3	Switzerland	6	2	4	392	436	−44	8	Third round
4	Austria	6	0	6	405	511	−106	6	Third round

Source: FIBA
Rules for classification: 1) Points; 2) Head-to-head; 3) Points difference; 4) Points scored.
Notes:

25 August 2022	Poland	69–72	Croatia	Warsaw
18:30	Scoring by quarter: 15–11, 16–10, 16–28, 22–23
	Pts: Ponitka 26; Rebs: three players 6 Asts: Ponitka 6	Boxscore	Pts: Zubac 19; Rebs: Zubac 10; Asts: Šarić 6	Arena: Arena COS Torwar; Attendance: 4,299; Referees: Gintaras Vitkauskas (LTU), Ivor Matějek (CZE), Zdenko Tomašovič (SVK)

25 August 2022	Switzerland	74–64	Austria	Fribourg
19:30	Scoring by quarter: 17–13, 16–21, 27–20, 14–10
	Pts: Zinn 14; Rebs: Kazadi 8 Asts: Zoccoletti 4	Boxscore	Pts: Murati 11; Rebs: Rados 6 Asts: Klepeisz 6	Arena: Fondation Sportif Saint Leonard; Attendance: 653; Referees: Petr Hrůša (CZE), Valerio Grigioni (ITA), Anastasios Kardaris (GRE)

28 August 2022	Austria	55–91	Poland	Schwechat
17:00	Scoring by quarter: 8–25, 17–11, 10–29, 20–26
	Pts: Murati 11; Rebs: Poljak 7 Asts: Lanmüller 4	Boxscore	Pts: Dziewa 15; Rebs: Dziewa, Olejniczak 5 Asts: Kolenda 5	Arena: Multiversum; Attendance: 1,000; Referees: Vladimir Jevtović (SRB), Juozas Barkauskas (LTU), Pavel Fúska (SVK)

28 August 2022	Croatia	84–53	Switzerland	Opatija
20:00	Scoring by quarter: 22–10, 28–16, 20–15, 14–12
	Pts: Matković 17; Rebs: Matković 12; Asts: Gnjidić, Simon 5	Boxscore	Pts: Fofana 10; Rebs: Rocak 5 Asts: Kazadi 3	Arena: Sportska dvorana Marino Cvetković; Attendance: 1,600; Referees: Petros Papapetrou (GRE), Geert Jacobs (BEL), Alessandro Perciavalle (ITA)

10 November 2022	Poland	79–64	Switzerland	Lublin
19:45	Scoring by quarter: 17–15, 15–22, 27–8, 20–19
	Pts: Balcerowski, Sokołowski 13; Rebs: Olejniczak 7 Asts: Pluta 5	Boxscore	Pts: Kovac 16; Rebs: Kubler, Nzege 6 Asts: Fofana 5	Arena: Globus Arena; Attendance: 2,884; Referees: Igor Mitrovski (MKD), Zdravko Rutešić (MNE), Nikola Bejat (NOR)

10 November 2022	Austria	75–100	Croatia	Graz
20:20	Scoring by quarter: 24–18, 19–30, 16–25, 16–27
	Pts: Vujošević 18; Rebs: Rados 8 Asts: Güttl 4	Boxscore	Pts: Badžim 23; Rebs: Branković 5 Asts: Kapusta 8	Arena: Raiffeisen Sportpark; Attendance: 2,115; Referees: Ventsislav Velikov (BUL), Mehmet Karabilecen (TUR), Marek Kúkelčík (SVK)

13 November 2022	Austria	65–75	Switzerland	Graz
17:05	Scoring by quarter: 15–18, 20–19, 14–15, 16–23
	Pts: Ersek 21; Rebs: Mbemba 9 Asts: Kaferle, Vujošević 3	Boxscore	Pts: Polite 22; Rebs: Gravet, Polite 5 Asts: Solca 3	Arena: Raiffeisen Sportpark; Attendance: 1,550; Referees: Özlem Yalman (TUR), Gellért Kapitány (HUN), Mihkel Männiste (EST)

13 November 2022	Croatia	79–87	Poland	Zagreb
20:00	Scoring by quarter: 18–21, 19–13, 19–24, 23–29
	Pts: Branković 17; Rebs: Prkačin 6 Asts: Kapusta 8	Boxscore	Pts: Garbacz, Zyskowski 21; Rebs: Sokołowski 8 Asts: four players 4	Arena: Dražen Petrović Basketball Hall; Attendance: 5,200; Referees: Sergii Zashchuk (UKR), Ilias Kounelles (CYP), Zdenko Tomašovič (SVK)

23 February 2023	Poland	87–72	Austria	Sosnowiec
18:00	Scoring by quarter: 26–21, 31–17, 14–19, 16–15
	Pts: Balcerowski 25; Rebs: Balcerowski 8 Asts: Schenk 10	Boxscore	Pts: Mahalbašić 22; Rebs: Mahalbašić 8 Asts: Mahalbašić 7	Arena: ArcelorMittal Park; Attendance: 2,760; Referees: Petros Papapetrou (GRE), Alberto Sánchez (ESP), Zdravko Rutešić (MNE)

23 February 2023	Switzerland	56–64	Croatia	Fribourg
19:30	Scoring by quarter: 21–13, 17–19, 11–15, 7–17
	Pts: Gravet, Polite 11; Rebs: Cotture 8 Asts: Kazadi 9	Boxscore	Pts: Prkačin 15; Rebs: Branković, Prkačin 8 Asts: four players 2	Arena: Fondation Sportif Saint Leonard; Attendance: 0 Referees: Gintaras Vitkauskas (LTU), Stylianos Simeonidis (GRE), Can Mavisu (TUR)

26 February 2023	Switzerland	70–80	Poland	Fribourg
17:00	Scoring by quarter: 27–21, 15–14, 16–23, 12–22
	Pts: Kazadi 14; Rebs: Polite 7 Asts: Kazadi 8	Boxscore	Pts: Balcerowski 31; Rebs: Balcerowski 9 Asts: Ponitka 14	Arena: Fondation Sportif Saint Leonard; Attendance: 1,789; Referees: Mart Uuehendrik (EST), Petr Hrůša (CZE), Zoran Mitrovski (MKD)

26 February 2023	Croatia	84–74	Austria	Split
17:00	Scoring by quarter: 23–19, 27–17, 21–20, 13–18
	Pts: Filipović 17; Rebs: Branković 7 Asts: Mavra 6	Boxscore	Pts: Mahalbašić 21; Rebs: Brajkovic 10; Asts: Mahalbašić 5	Arena: Spaladium Arena; Attendance: 1,500; Referees: Mehmet Şahin (TUR), Francisco Araña (ESP), Ivor Matějek (CZE)

===== Group F =====
Pos	Team	Pld	W	L	PF	PA	PD	Pts	Qualification
1	Portugal	6	5	1	514	424	+90	11 (Note: Portugal 170–168 Bulgaria)	Qualifiers
2	Bulgaria	6	5	1	477	424	+53	11	Third round
3	Romania	6	2	4	398	428	−30	8	Third round
4	Cyprus	6	0	6	371	484	−113	6	Qualifiers as host

Source: FIBA
Rules for classification: 1) Points; 2) Head-to-head; 3) Points difference; 4) Points scored.
Notes:

25 August 2022	Bulgaria	88–55	Cyprus	Samokov
19:00	Scoring by quarter: 19–15, 29–15, 16–11, 24–14
	Pts: Vezenkov 24; Rebs: Vezenkov 8 Asts: P. Ivanov, Marinov 4	Boxscore	Pts: Tigkas 20; Rebs: Koumis 4 Asts: Tigkas 3	Arena: Arena Samokov; Attendance: 1,700; Referees: Zoran Mitrovski (MKD), Josip Jurčević (CRO), Siniša Prpa (SRB)

25 August 2022	Romania	59–75	Portugal	Ploiești
19:00	Scoring by quarter: 14–17, 16–25, 19–19, 10–14
	Pts: Olah, P. Richard 13; Rebs: Cățe, P. Richard 7 Asts: P. Richard 4	Boxscore	Pts: Queta 20; Rebs: Queta 10; Asts: three players 3	Arena: Olimpia Sports Hall; Attendance: 2,500; Referees: Ofer Manheim (ISR), Marek Kúkelčík (SVK), Łukasz Jankowski (POL)

28 August 2022	Portugal	102–69	Cyprus	Odivelas
17:00	Scoring by quarter: 35–17, 23–22, 23–18, 21–12
	Pts: Queta 17; Rebs: Queta 13; Asts: Williams 7	Boxscore	Pts: Tigkas 20; Rebs: Stylianou 7 Asts: Panteli 4	Arena: Pavilhão Multiusos de Odivelas; Attendance: 2,500; Referees: Valentin Oliot (FRA), Alberto Sánchez (ESP), Jan Baloun (CZE)

28 August 2022	Bulgaria	84–72	Romania	Samokov
19:00	Scoring by quarter: 29–19, 12–15, 23–20, 20–18
	Pts: Vezenkov 28; Rebs: Vezenkov 15; Asts: Vezenkov 7	Boxscore	Pts: P. Richard 14; Rebs: three players 7 Asts: P. Richard, Tohătan 5	Arena: Arena Samokov; Attendance: 1,500; Referees: Vilius Mačiulaitis (LTU), Goran Šljivić (AUT), Blaž Zupančič (SLO)

10 November 2022	Cyprus	65–69	Romania	Nicosia
19:00	Scoring by quarter: 19–19, 16–21, 13–14, 17–15
	Pts: Simitzis 19; Rebs: Mantovani 11; Asts: three players 2	Boxscore	Pts: Nicolescu 18; Rebs: P. Richard 8 Asts: P. Richard 9	Arena: Eleftheria Indoor Hall; Attendance: 500; Referees: Bojan Jovanić (BIH), Ofer Manheim (ISR), Haris Bijedić (BIH)

10 November 2022	Portugal	88–78	Bulgaria	Coimbra
19:00	Scoring by quarter: 21–20, 23–32, 23–12, 21–14
	Pts: Brito 19; Rebs: Voytso 8 Asts: Ventura 6	Boxscore	Pts: Kostov 17; Rebs: Kravish 7 Asts: P. Ivanov 6	Arena: Pavilhão Multidesportos Dr. Mário Mexia; Attendance: 1,500; Referees: Mart Uuehendrik (EST), Sergio Rodríguez (ESP), Alexandre Deman (FRA)

13 November 2022	Cyprus	66–75	Bulgaria	Nicosia
16:00	Scoring by quarter: 8–16, 13–17, 27–24, 18–18
	Pts: Michail, Stylianou 16; Rebs: Stylianou 6 Asts: Michail 3	Boxscore	Pts: P. Ivanov 14; Rebs: A. Ivanov 11; Asts: Karamfilov 4	Arena: Eleftheria Indoor Hall; Attendance: 1,600; Referees: Alfred Jovović (CRO), Dumitru Stasiev (MDA), Nemanja Ninković (SRB)

13 November 2022	Portugal	92–62	Romania	Coimbra
17:00	Scoring by quarter: 27–14, 27–27, 18–10, 20–11
	Pts: Williams 20; Rebs: Amarante, Queiroz 7 Asts: Queiroz 6	Boxscore	Pts: Cățe 14; Rebs: Cățe 12; Asts: P. Richard 5	Arena: Pavilhão Multidesportos Dr. Mário Mexia; Attendance: 1,700; Referees: Petr Hrůša (CZE), Zoran Mitrovski (MKD), Juozas Barkauskas (LTU)

23 February 2023	Romania	61–62	Bulgaria	Pitești
18:00	Scoring by quarter: 12–16, 13–15, 19–13, 17–18
	Pts: Torok 12; Rebs: Cățe 7 Asts: K. Richard, Tohătan 4	Boxscore	Pts: P. Ivanov 14; Rebs: Kostov, Minchev 9 Asts: Miller-McIntyre 12	Arena: Pitești Arena; Attendance: 3,089; Referees: Mehmet Karabilecen (TUR), Péter Praksch (HUN), Łukasz Jankowski (POL)

23 February 2023	Cyprus	66–75	Portugal	Nicosia
19:00	Scoring by quarter: 9–21, 27–17, 22–26, 8–11
	Pts: Tigkas 16; Rebs: Mantovani, Simitzis 6 Asts: Michail 4	Boxscore	Pts: Williams 24; Rebs: Queiroz 15; Asts: Brito 5	Arena: Eleftheria Indoor Hall; Attendance: 1,500; Referees: Alexandre Deman (FRA), Blaž Zupančič (SLO), Goran Šljivić (AUT)

26 February 2023	Romania	75–50	Cyprus	Pitești
18:00	Scoring by quarter: 24–11, 16–20, 18–6, 17–13
	Pts: P. Richard 15; Rebs: Cățe, Olah 8 Asts: P. Richard, Tohătan 5	Boxscore	Pts: Stylianou 12; Rebs: Mantovani, Stylianou 6 Asts: three players 2	Arena: Pitești Arena; Attendance: 3,200; Referees: Igor Mitrovski (MKD), Valentin Oliot (FRA), Alfred Jovović (CRO)

26 February 2023	Bulgaria	90–82	Portugal	Botevgrad
18:00	Scoring by quarter: 19–19, 24–21, 27–18, 20–24
	Pts: Vezenkov 30; Rebs: Miller-McIntyre 6 Asts: Miller-McIntyre 5	Boxscore	Pts: Williams 21; Rebs: Queiroz 7 Asts: Lisboa 4	Arena: Arena Botevgrad; Attendance: 4,000; Referees: Vladimir Jevtović (SRB), Siniša Prpa (SRB), Ofer Manheim (ISR)

=== Third round ===
The draw took place on 25 April 2023. The pre-qualifiers third round was played from 19 July to 5 August 2023. Twelve teams participated: the four teams eliminated from the first round were joined by the eight teams eliminated from the second round. The teams played in four groups of three; the four best-ranked teams advanced to the Qualifiers.

==== Teams ====
Entrance/qualification method	Team(s)
Eliminated from the First round	Albania; Ireland; Kosovo; Luxembourg
Eliminated from the Second round	Austria; Bulgaria; Croatia; Denmark; Norway; Romania; Slovakia; Switzerland

===== Seeding =====
The seeding was based on the FIBA World Rankings of 27 February 2023.

Seed 1
Team	Pos
Croatia	25
Bulgaria	47
Romania	57
Switzerland	58

Seed 2
Team	Pos
Denmark	60
Slovakia	61
Austria	63
Luxembourg	77

Seed 3
Team	Pos
Kosovo	80
Norway	93
Ireland	96
Albania	100

==== Groups ====
All times are local.

===== Group G =====
Pos	Team	Pld	W	L	PF	PA	PD	Pts	Qualification
1	Croatia	4	4	0	373	251	+122	8	Qualifiers
2	Ireland	4	2	2	285	336	−51	6	
3	Luxembourg	4	0	4	293	364	−71	4	

Source: FIBA
Rules for classification: 1) Points; 2) Head-to-head; 3) Points difference; 4) Points scored.

19 July 2023	Croatia	89–49	Ireland	Opatija
20:00	Scoring by quarter: 24–5, 32–12, 14–16, 19–16
	Pts: Badžim 18; Rebs: Perković 8 Asts: Kapusta 9	Boxscore	Pts: Quinn 12; Rebs: Alajiki 5 Asts: Quinn 4	Arena: Sportska dvorana Marino Cvetković; Attendance: 970; Referees: Georgios Poursanidis (GRE), Luis Castillo (ESP), Oskars Lūcis (LAT)

22 July 2023	Croatia	98–62	Luxembourg	Opatija
20:00	Scoring by quarter: 31–14, 26–20, 23–12, 18–16
	Pts: Kapusta, Prkačin 16; Rebs: Branković, Mazalin 6 Asts: Badžim 6	Boxscore	Pts: Laurent 18; Rebs: Laurent, Rugg 9 Asts: Gutenkauf 4	Arena: Sportska dvorana Marino Cvetković; Attendance: 600; Referees: Paulo Marques (POR), Geert Jacobs (BEL), Ivor Matějek (CZE)

26 July 2023	Luxembourg	76–96	Ireland	Luxembourg City
20:15	Scoring by quarter: 21–23, 16–17, 22–30, 17–26
	Pts: Laurent 16; Rebs: Rugg 8 Asts: Delgado 5	Boxscore	Pts: Badmus, Igiehon 20; Rebs: Alajiki 13; Asts: Quinn 3	Arena: d'Coque; Attendance: 1,413; Referees: Aleksandar Glišić (SRB), Mihkel Männiste (EST), Vladimir Jevtović (SRB)

29 July 2023	Ireland	61–95	Croatia	Dublin
14:30	Scoring by quarter: 12–20, 22–22, 8–21, 19–32
	Pts: Murphy 12; Rebs: Alajiki 5 Asts: Fulton 4	Boxscore	Pts: D. Drežnjak 17; Rebs: D. Drežnjak 5 Asts: five players 3	Arena: National Basketball Arena; Attendance: 2,000; Referees: Mārtiņš Kozlovskis (LAT), Fernando Calatrava (ESP), Javier Torres (ESP)

2 August 2023	Luxembourg	79–91	Croatia	Luxembourg City
20:15	Scoring by quarter: 12–25, 25–25, 18–24, 24–17
	Pts: Laurent 13; Rebs: Rugg 7 Asts: Kovac 4	Boxscore	Pts: Perković 23; Rebs: Ljubičić 7 Asts: Kapusta 9	Arena: d'Coque; Attendance: 1,650; Referees: Can Mavisu (TUR), Geert Jacobs (BEL), Alexandre Deman (FRA)

5 August 2023	Ireland	79–76	Luxembourg	Dublin
19:30	Scoring by quarter: 29–20, 12–23, 18–20, 20–13
	Pts: Blount, Fulton 16; Rebs: Blount 14; Asts: Blount 6	Boxscore	Pts: Rugg 27; Rebs: Rugg 12; Asts: Gutenkauf, Rugg 3	Arena: National Basketball Arena; Attendance: 3,000; Referees: Antonio Conde (ESP), Emmanouil Tsolakos (GRE), Hrvoje Čavar (BIH)

===== Group H =====
Pos	Team	Pld	W	L	PF	PA	PD	Pts	Qualification
1	Denmark	4	4	0	324	265	+59	8	Qualifiers
2	Kosovo	4	2	2	290	291	−1	6	
3	Switzerland	4	0	4	248	306	−58	4	

Source: FIBA
Rules for classification: 1) Points; 2) Head-to-head; 3) Points difference; 4) Points scored.

19 July 2023	Kosovo	76–49	Switzerland	Prizren
20:45	Scoring by quarter: 18–16, 23–8, 27–14, 8–11
	Pts: Berisha 20; Rebs: Hajrizi 12; Asts: Artis 6	Boxscore	Pts: Rocak 12; Rebs: Tutonda 7 Asts: Fofana 3	Arena: Sezai Surroi Sports Hall; Attendance: 1,700; Referees: Paulo Marques (POR), Beniamino Attard (ITA), Franko Gracin (CRO)

22 July 2023	Switzerland	46–60	Denmark	Fribourg
17:30	Scoring by quarter: 6–18, 17–9, 13–12, 10–21
	Pts: three players 7 Rebs: Rocak 5 Asts: Fofana 3	Boxscore	Pts: Lundberg 14; Rebs: Dibba 10; Asts: Bergstedt, Lundberg 3	Arena: Fondation Sportif Saint Leonard; Attendance: 540; Referees: Fernando Calatrava (ESP), Lorenzo Baldini (ITA), Łukasz Jankowski (POL)

26 July 2023	Denmark	82–75	Kosovo	Næstved
18:00	Scoring by quarter: 27–16, 17–27, 25–22, 13–10
	Pts: Lundberg 20; Rebs: Dibba 9 Asts: Jukić 7	Boxscore	Pts: Artis 23; Rebs: Berisha, Shoshi 6 Asts: Artis 4	Arena: Næstved Arena; Attendance: 930; Referees: Geert Jacobs (BEL), Sergii Zashchuk (UKR), Javier Torres (ESP)

29 July 2023	Switzerland	72–76	Kosovo	Fribourg
17:30	Scoring by quarter: 21–20, 18–15, 22–21, 11–20
	Pts: Tutonda 15; Rebs: Fofana 10; Asts: Fofana 7	Boxscore	Pts: Artis 22; Rebs: Hajrizi 8 Asts: Artis 4	Arena: Fondation Sportif Saint Leonard; Attendance: 840; Referees: Gintaras Vitkauskas (LTU), Alexandre Deman (FRA), Valentin Oliot (FRA)

2 August 2023	Denmark	94–81	Switzerland	Næstved
18:00	Scoring by quarter: 18–25, 26–9, 27–21, 23–26
	Pts: Lundberg 22; Rebs: Erikstrup 9 Asts: Jukić 9	Boxscore	Pts: De la Fuente 22; Rebs: Fofana, Martin 5 Asts: Fofana 9	Arena: Næstved Arena; Attendance: 1,280; Referees: Antonio Conde (ESP), Josip Jurčević (CRO), Juozas Barkauskas (LTU)

5 August 2023	Kosovo	63–88	Denmark	Prizren
20:45	Scoring by quarter: 17–24, 11–23, 17–21, 18–20
	Pts: Artis, Janjeva 11; Rebs: Hajrizi 6 Asts: Hajrizi 3	Boxscore	Pts: Lundberg 28; Rebs: Bergstedt 9 Asts: Lundberg 5	Arena: Sezai Surroi Sports Hall; Attendance: 2,000; Referees: Yener Yılmaz (TUR), Gellért Kapitány (HUN), Mehmet Şahin (TUR)

===== Group I =====
Pos	Team	Pld	W	L	PF	PA	PD	Pts	Qualification
1	Slovakia	4	4	0	327	250	+77	8	Qualifiers
2	Romania	4	2	2	282	298	−16	6	
3	Albania	4	0	4	273	334	−61	4	

Source: FIBA
Rules for classification: 1) Points; 2) Head-to-head; 3) Points difference; 4) Points scored.

19 July 2023	Albania	83–87	Romania	Durrës
20:30	Scoring by quarter: 22–21, 20–23, 22–25, 19–18
	Pts: Lekndreaj 20; Rebs: Lekndreaj 11; Asts: Dusha 4	Boxscore	Pts: K. Richard 18; Rebs: Diculescu 9 Asts: K. Richard 8	Arena: Dhimitraq Goga Sports Palace; Attendance: 0 Referees: Kerem Baki (TUR), Sergii Zashchuk (UKR), Martin Vulić (CRO)

22 July 2023	Romania	65–69	Slovakia	Pitești
18:30	Scoring by quarter: 10–18, 19–13, 24–23, 12–15
	Pts: Olah 22; Rebs: Olah 10; Asts: K. Richard 6	Boxscore	Pts: Brodziansky 32; Rebs: Mokráň 8 Asts: Krajčovič 6	Arena: Pitești Arena; Attendance: 1,005; Referees: Yener Yılmaz (TUR), Alberto Sánchez (ESP), Mehmet Karabilecen (TUR)

26 July 2023	Slovakia	86–63	Albania	Levice
18:00	Scoring by quarter: 30–27, 16–10, 19–3, 21–23
	Pts: Brodziansky 19; Rebs: Mokráň 9 Asts: Majerčák 7	Boxscore	Pts: Dusha 19; Rebs: Tola 7 Asts: F. Lilaj, Lekndreaj 2	Arena: Športová hala Levice; Attendance: 1,300; Referees: Zafer Yılmaz (TUR), Can Mavisu (TUR), Gvidas Gedvilas (LTU)

29 July 2023	Romania	72–63	Albania	Pitești
18:30	Scoring by quarter: 10–23, 26–16, 20–16, 16–8
	Pts: Popa 17; Rebs: Diculescu 9 Asts: three players 5	Boxscore	Pts: Lekndreaj 16; Rebs: Lekndreaj 11; Asts: Dusha 7	Arena: Pitești Arena; Attendance: 1,000; Referees: Haris Bijedić (BIH), Petar Pešić (SRB), Nermin Hodžić (BIH)

2 August 2023	Slovakia	83–58	Romania	Levice
18:00	Scoring by quarter: 19–13, 19–18, 23–16, 22–11
	Pts: Mokráň 22; Rebs: Brodziansky 10; Asts: Krajčovič 7	Boxscore	Pts: Olah 11; Rebs: Măciucă 7 Asts: K. Richard 4	Arena: Športová hala Levice; Attendance: 1,450; Referees: Fernando Calatrava (ESP), Zoran Mitrovski (MKD), Mehmet Şahin (TUR)

5 August 2023	Albania	64–89	Slovakia	Durrës
20:30	Scoring by quarter: 21–15, 13–26, 15–28, 15–20
	Pts: F. Lilaj 14; Rebs: Hamati 7 Asts: Hysa 7	Boxscore	Pts: Hilvak 20; Rebs: Mokráň, Pavelka 5 Asts: Hilvak, Majerčák 6	Arena: Dhimitraq Goga Sports Palace; Attendance: 150; Referees: Martin Horozov (BUL), Özlem Yalman (TUR), Nemanja Ninković (SRB)

===== Group J =====
Pos	Team	Pld	W	L	PF	PA	PD	Pts	Qualification
1	Bulgaria	4	3	1	339	297	+42	7	Qualifiers
2	Norway	4	2	2	305	330	−25	6	
3	Austria	4	1	3	301	318	−17	5	

Source: FIBA
Rules for classification: 1) Points; 2) Head-to-head; 3) Points difference; 4) Points scored.

19 July 2023	Norway	86–80	Bulgaria	Asker
19:00	Scoring by quarter: 22–21, 27–18, 19–8, 18–33
	Pts: Frey 27; Rebs: Ndow 8 Asts: Frey 4	Boxscore	Pts: Miller-McIntyre 20; Rebs: Alipiev 7 Asts: P. Ivanov 9	Arena: Varner Arena; Attendance: 1,950; Referees: Gatis Saliņš (LAT), Michał Proc (POL), Gvidas Gedvilas (LTU)

22 July 2023	Bulgaria	83–71	Austria	Botevgrad
18:00	Scoring by quarter: 15–20, 19–7, 26–20, 23–24
	Pts: Simeonov 29; Rebs: Simeonov 11; Asts: Miller–McIntyre 6	Boxscore	Pts: Vujošević 15; Rebs: Vujošević 6 Asts: Vujošević 7	Arena: Arena Botevgrad; Attendance: 1,500; Referees: Aleksandar Glišić (SRB), Gintaras Mačiulis (LTU), Zdenko Tomašovič (SVK)

26 July 2023	Austria	85–66	Norway	Schwechat
18:30	Scoring by quarter: 25–15, 24–12, 21–15, 15–24
	Pts: Vujošević 21; Rebs: four players 6 Asts: Güttl 5	Boxscore	Pts: Ndow 21; Rebs: Kolstad 7 Asts: Espe 5	Arena: Multiversum; Attendance: 1,350; Referees: Ademir Zurapović (BIH), Martin Vulić (CRO), Ariadna Chueca (ESP)

29 July 2023	Bulgaria	91–69	Norway	Botevgrad
18:00	Scoring by quarter: 20–14, 30–20, 24–17, 17–18
	Pts: Kostadinov 19; Rebs: Kostadinov 9 Asts: Miller-McIntyre 13	Boxscore	Pts: Kolstad 12; Rebs: Sjölund 6 Asts: Frey 8	Arena: Arena Botevgrad; Attendance: 2,000; Referees: Yener Yılmaz (TUR), Josip Jurčević (CRO), Vladimir Jevtović (SRB)

2 August 2023	Austria	71–85	Bulgaria	Schwechat
19:15	Scoring by quarter: 13–28, 25–25, 14–16, 19–16
	Pts: Vujošević 24; Rebs: Patekar 6 Asts: Kaferle 3	Boxscore	Pts: Miller-McIntyre, P. Ivanov 18; Rebs: Kostadinov, Simeonov 8 Asts: Miller-McIntyre 8	Arena: Multiversum; Attendance: 1,700; Referees: Michał Proc (POL), Marek Kúkelčík (SVK), Carsten Straube (GER)

5 August 2023	Norway	84–74	Austria	Asker
18:00	Scoring by quarter: 22–17, 19–23, 22–18, 21–16
	Pts: Ndow 29; Rebs: Berg, Ndow 9 Asts: Kolstad 4	Boxscore	Pts: Güttl 15; Rebs: Lohr 8 Asts: Ersek, Vujošević 5	Arena: Varner Arena; Attendance: 2,100; Referees: Gatis Saliņš (LAT), Gintaras Vitkauskas (LTU), Armin Mutapčić (GER)

== Qualifiers ==
The EuroBasket 2025 Qualifiers were played in the following windows: February 2024, November 2024 and February 2025. 32 teams, including the Eurobasket co-hosts, were drawn into eight groups by four teams. Three teams from each group qualified for the Eurobasket 2025. For the groups containing the host teams: Cyprus, Finland, Latvia and Poland. The host and the two other highest placed teams qualified for the tournament. They also earned their place in the qualifiers for the 2027 FIBA World Cup in Qatar.

=== Teams ===
Entrance/qualification method	Team(s)
Host nations	Cyprus; Finland; Latvia; Poland
2023 World Cup qualifiers second round teams	Belgium; Bosnia and Herzegovina; Czech Republic; Estonia; France; Georgia; Germany; Great Britain; Greece; Hungary; Iceland; Israel; Italy; Lithuania; Montenegro; Netherlands; Serbia; Slovenia; Spain; Sweden; Turkey; Ukraine
Pre-Qualifiers Second round	North Macedonia; Portugal
Pre-Qualifiers Third round	Bulgaria; Croatia; Denmark; Slovakia

=== Draw ===
The draw was held on 8 August 2023 in Munich, Germany. The 32 participating nations were sorted into eight groups of four teams each at the draw.

==== Seeding ====
The seeding was announced on 7 August 2023. In bold, teams that host the final tournament.

Teams from seed 1 were drawn into the groups A, C, E and G with teams from seeds 4, 5 and 8. Teams from seed 2 were drawn into the groups B, D, F and H with teams from seeds 3, 6 and 7. Only one host of the final stage could be drawn in any group.

Seed 1
Team	Pos
Spain	1
France	5
Serbia	6
Slovenia	7

Seed 2
Team	Pos
Lithuania	8
Greece	9
Italy	10
Germany	11

Seed 3
Team	Pos
Czech Republic	12
**Poland**	14
Turkey	16
Montenegro	18

Seed 4
Team	Pos
**Finland**	24
Croatia	25
Ukraine	28
**Latvia**	29

Seed 5
Team	Pos
Belgium	30
Georgia	32
Israel	33
Bosnia and Herzegovina	35

Seed 6
Team	Pos
Hungary	39
Estonia	44
Netherlands	45
Bulgaria	47

Seed 7
Team	Pos
Great Britain	48
Iceland	49
Sweden	50
North Macedonia	53

Seed 8
Team	Pos
Portugal	54
Denmark	60
Slovakia	61
**Cyprus**	78

All times are local.

=== Group A ===
Pos	Team	Pld	W	L	PF	PA	PD	Pts	Qualification
1	Israel	6	5	1	493	458	+35	**11**	EuroBasket 2025
2	Slovenia	6	4	2	490	471	+19	**10**	EuroBasket 2025
3	Portugal	6	2	4	451	478	−27	**8**	EuroBasket 2025
4	Ukraine	6	1	5	457	484	−27	**7**	

Source: FIBA
Rules for classification: 1) Points; 2) Head-to-head; 3) Points difference; 4) Points scored.

22 February 2024	**Slovenia**	**87**–73	Ukraine	Koper
18:00	Scoring by quarter: 21–**22**, 18–18, **25**–13, **23**–20
	Pts: Prepelič 30; Rebs: Tobey 9 Asts: Prepelič 9	Boxscore	Pts: Kovliar 23; Rebs: Petrov 10; Asts: Kovliar 8	Arena: Arena Bonifika; Attendance: 2,500; Referees: Saverio Lanzarini (ITA), Alexandre Deman (FRA), Gintaras Mačiulis (LTU)

22 February 2024	Portugal	70–**72**	**Israel**	Odivelas
19:15	Scoring by quarter: 19–19, 17–**19**, 17–**18**, **17**–16
	Pts: Williams 18; Rebs: Queiroz 9 Asts: Ventura 5	Boxscore	Pts: Ginat 17; Rebs: Segev 7 Asts: Madar 5	Arena: Pavilhão Multiusos de Odivelas; Attendance: 2,150; Referees: Martin Vulić (CRO), Geert Jacobs (BEL), Ivor Matějek (CZE)

25 February 2024	**Slovenia**	**88**–79	Israel	Koper
18:00	Scoring by quarter: 8–**20**, **32**–17, **25**–16, 23–**26**
	Pts: Prepelič 21; Rebs: Tobey 12; Asts: Prepelič, Samar 7	Boxscore	Pts: Madar 19; Rebs: Ginat 10; Asts: Madar 6	Arena: Arena Bonifika; Attendance: 2,740; Referees: Georgios Poursanidis (GRE), Ariadna Chueca (ESP), Beniamino Attard (ITA)

25 February 2024	Ukraine	77–**79**	**Portugal**	Riga, Latvia (Note: Due to the Russian invasion of Ukraine, the Ukrainian team plays their home matches at neutral venues.)
21:00	Scoring by quarter: 16–**26**, 16–**21**, **27**–15, **18**–17
	Pts: Kovliar 17; Rebs: Bobrov 8 Asts: Kovliar 10	Boxscore	Pts: Queiroz 21; Rebs: Queiroz 6 Asts: Williams 5	Arena: Arena Riga; Attendance: 900; Referees: Lorenzo Baldini (ITA), Mihkel Männiste (EST), Juozas Barkauskas (LTU)

22 November 2024	**Portugal**	**82**–74	Slovenia	Almada
19:00	Scoring by quarter: **22**–10, **27**–14, 15–**24**, 18–**26**
	Pts: Brito, Delgado 16; Rebs: Delgado 9 Asts: Amarante 4	Boxscore	Pts: Prepelič 23; Rebs: Mirtic 5 Asts: Padjen 7	Arena: Complexo Municipal de Desportos Cidade de Almada; Attendance: 2,453; Referees: Luis Castillo (ESP), Andris Aunkrogers (LAT), Zafer Yılmaz (TUR)

23 November 2024	Ukraine	73–**86**	**Israel**	Riga, Latvia
18:00	Scoring by quarter: **19**–16, 18–**20**, 18–**29**, 18–**21**
	Pts: Pustovyi 23; Rebs: Bliznyuk, Voinalovych 5 Asts: Sydorov 4	Boxscore	Pts: Madar 21; Rebs: Sorkin 10; Asts: Madar 7	Arena: Arena Riga; Attendance: 700; Referees: Fernando Calatrava (ESP), Petar Pešić (SRB), Alberto Sánchez (ESP)

25 November 2024	**Slovenia**	**83**–82	Portugal	Koper
18:00	Scoring by quarter: **24**–17, 20–**32**, **22**–19, **17**–14
	Pts: Prepelič 31; Rebs: Blažič 8 Asts: Prepelič 6	Boxscore	Pts: Williams 17; Rebs: Queiroz 13; Asts: Lisboa, Queiroz 4	Arena: Arena Bonifika; Attendance: 1,600; Referees: Yohan Rosso (FRA), Dariusz Zapolski (POL), Can Mavisu (TUR)

25 November 2024	**Israel**	**88**–75	Ukraine	Riga, Latvia (Note: Due to the Gaza war, the Israelian team plays their home matches at neutral venues.)
20:00	Scoring by quarter: 11–**16**, 18–**24**, **27**–17, **32**–18
	Pts: Madar 24; Rebs: Sorkin 8 Asts: Madar 7	Boxscore	Pts: Kovliar, Pustovyi 15; Rebs: Pustovyi 5 Asts: Bryniuk 5	Arena: Arena Riga; Attendance: 100; Referees: Ademir Zurapović (BIH), Andris Aunkrogers (LAT), Kerem Baki (TUR)

21 February 2025	Ukraine	71–**84**	**Slovenia**	Riga, Latvia
17:30	Scoring by quarter: 22–**24**, **14**–21, 19–**21**, 16–**18**
	Pts: Bliznyuk, Pustovyi 16; Rebs: three players 7 Asts: Zotov 6	Boxscore	Pts: Hrovat 22; Rebs: Daneu 11; Asts: Hrovat 7	Arena: Xiaomi Arena; Attendance: 650; Referees: Michał Proc (POL), Juozas Barkauskas (LTU), Alberto Sánchez (ESP)

21 February 2025	**Israel**	**84**–78	Portugal	Riga, Latvia
21:00	Scoring by quarter: 18–18, **29**–14, 18–**21**, 19–**25**
	Pts: Timor 15; Rebs: Kravits, Segev 5 Asts: Saraf, Timor 5	Boxscore	Pts: Lisboa 20; Rebs: Delgado 9 Asts: Ventura 7	Arena: Xiaomi Arena; Attendance: 50; Referees: Martin Horozov (BUL), Martin Vulić (CRO), Siniša Prpa (SRB)

24 February 2025	Portugal	60–**88**	**Ukraine**	Matosinhos
19:00	Scoring by quarter: 17–**24**, 15–**17**, 18–**30**, 10–**17**
	Pts: Williams 14; Rebs: Queiroz, Relvao 5 Asts: Queiroz 6	Boxscore	Pts: Bobrov 16; Rebs: Bliznyuk 7 Asts: Bliznyuk, Lukashov 5	Arena: Centro de Desportos e Congressos de Matosinhos; Attendance: 3,843; Referees: Mārtiņš Kozlovskis (LAT), Gintaras Mačiulis (LTU), Zafer Yılmaz (TUR)

24 February 2025	**Israel**	**84**–74	Slovenia	Riga, Latvia
21:00	Scoring by quarter: 11–15, **25**–16, 25–**28**, **23**–15
	Pts: Yaacov 17; Rebs: Segev 10; Asts: Yaacov 7	Boxscore	Pts: Stergar 16; Rebs: Daneu 7 Asts: Stergar 4	Arena: Xiaomi Arena; Attendance: 30; Referees: Kerem Baki (TUR), Carsten Straube (GER), Zdenko Tomašovič (SVK)

=== Group B ===
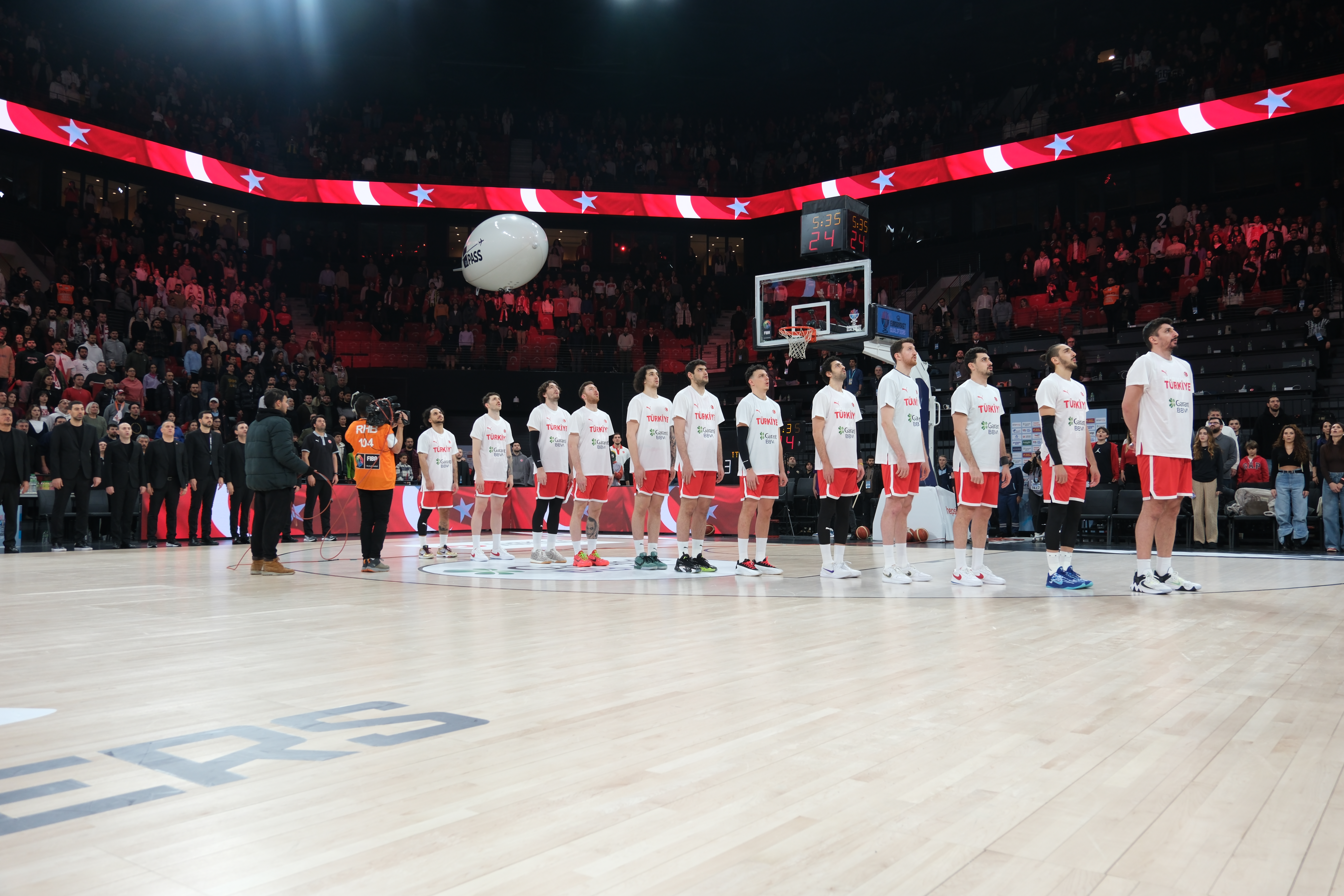
Türkiye in EuroBasket 2025 qualification

Pos	Team	Pld	W	L	PF	PA	PD	Pts	Qualification
1	Italy	6	4	2	486	432	+54	**10**	EuroBasket 2025
2	Iceland	6	3	3	458	468	−10	**9 (Note: Tied on head-to-head points. Head-to-head points difference: Iceland +11, Turkey –11.)**	EuroBasket 2025
3	Turkey	6	3	3	467	467	0	**9**	EuroBasket 2025
4	Hungary	6	2	4	427	471	−44	**8**	

Source: FIBA
Rules for classification: 1) Points; 2) Head-to-head; 3) Points difference; 4) Points scored.
Notes:

22 February 2024	**Iceland**	**70**–65	Hungary	Reykjavík
19:30	Scoring by quarter: 16–**19**, 17–**18**, **16**–14, **21**–14
	Pts: Hermannsson 17; Rebs: Hlinason 11; Asts: Friðriksson 8	Boxscore	Pts: Golomán, Perl 12; Rebs: Golomán, Hopkins 8 Asts: Perl 6	Arena: Laugardalshöll; Attendance: 2,000; Referees: Andris Aunkrogers (LAT), Ariadna Chueca (ESP), Zdenko Tomašovič (SVK)

22 February 2024	**Italy**	**87**–80	Turkey	Pesaro
20:30	Scoring by quarter: 24–24, **26**–15, **18**–17, 19–**24**
	Pts: Melli 17; Rebs: Procida 10; Asts: Pajola 7	Boxscore	Pts: Biberović 27; Rebs: Biberoviç 8 Asts: Sipahi 8	Arena: Vitrifrigo Arena; Attendance: 8,800; Referees: Antonio Conde (ESP), Gatis Saliņš (LAT), Carsten Straube (GER)

25 February 2024	**Turkey**	**76**–75	Iceland	Istanbul
16:00	Scoring by quarter: 16–16, **19**–14, **19**–17, 22–**28**
	Pts: Şanlı 20; Rebs: Şanlı 12; Asts: Sipahi 7	Boxscore	Pts: Hermannsson 15; Rebs: Hlinason 10; Asts: Friðriksson 5	Arena: Sinan Erdem Dome; Attendance: 13,300; Referees: Ademir Zurapović (BIH), Geert Jacobs (BEL), Petar Pešić (SRB)

25 February 2024	Hungary	62–**83**	**Italy**	Szombathely
18:00	Scoring by quarter: 15–**17**, **22**–19, 9–**28**, 16–**19**
	Pts: Perl 12; Rebs: Hanga 6 Asts: three players 3	Boxscore	Pts: Bortolani, Tessitori 12; Rebs: Tessitori 7 Asts: Pajola 6	Arena: Arena Savaria; Attendance: 3,000; Referees: Paulo Marques (POR), Gvidas Gedvilas (LTU), Ilias Kounelles (CYP)

22 November 2024	Iceland	71–**95**	**Italy**	Reykjavík
19:30	Scoring by quarter: 12–**27**, 13–**22**, **29**–16, 17–**30**
	Pts: Friðriksson, Hlinason 15; Rebs: Hlinason 8 Asts: Friðriksson, Guðmundsson 4	Boxscore	Pts: Basile 19; Rebs: Akele 10; Asts: Spissu 8	Arena: Laugardalshöll; Attendance: 2,132; Referees: Boris Krejić (SLO), Dariusz Zapolski (POL), Josip Jurčević (CRO)

22 November 2024	**Turkey**	**92**–66	Hungary	Istanbul
20:30	Scoring by quarter: **27**–20, 16–**17**, **19**–12, **30**–17
	Pts: Hazer 25; Rebs: Haltalı 9 Asts: Sipahi 6	Boxscore	Pts: Perl 16; Rebs: Golomán 7 Asts: Váradi 5	Arena: Basketbol Gelişim Merkezi; Attendance: 8,573; Referees: Yohan Rosso (FRA), Michał Proc (POL), Sergii Zashchuk (UKR)

25 November 2024	Hungary	76–**81**	**Turkey**	Szombathely
18:00	Scoring by quarter: 14–**21**, 17–**19**, **23**–14, 22–**27**
	Pts: Golomán 16; Rebs: Golomán, Perl 7 Asts: Hanga 9	Boxscore	Pts: Osman 33; Rebs: Osman 11; Asts: Sipahi 11	Arena: Arena Savaria; Attendance: 2,500; Referees: Boris Krejić (SLO), Aleksandar Glišić (SRB), Martin Vulić (CRO)

25 November 2024	Italy	74–**81**	**Iceland**	Reggio Emilia
20:30	Scoring by quarter: 9–**22**, **20**–10, **27**–26, 18–**23**
	Pts: Ricci 18; Rebs: Melli 11; Asts: Spissu 6	Boxscore	Pts: Pálsson 22; Rebs: Hlinason 8 Asts: Friðriksson 8	Arena: Palasport Giulio Bigi; Attendance: 4,500; Referees: Luis Castillo (ESP), Petar Pešić (SRB), Ivor Matějek (CZE)

20 February 2025	**Hungary**	**87**–78	Iceland	Szombathely
18:00	Scoring by quarter: 20–**21**, **28**–11, 24–**25**, 15–**21**
	Pts: Perl 25; Rebs: Reuvers 9 Asts: Somogyi, Váradi 4	Boxscore	Pts: Hermannsson 25; Rebs: Hlinason 11; Asts: Friðriksson 10	Arena: Arena Savaria; Attendance: 2,300; Referees: Julio Anaya (PAN), Georgios Poursanidis (GRE), Carsten Straube (GER)

20 February 2025	Turkey	67–**80**	**Italy**	Istanbul
18:30	Scoring by quarter: 12–**17**, 19–**31**, **19**–12, 17–**20**
	Pts: Osman 16; Rebs: Osmani 9 Asts: Sipahi 7	Boxscore	Pts: Bortolani 16; Rebs: Diouf 10; Asts: Pajola 6	Arena: Basketball Development Centre; Attendance: 8,655; Referees: Ademir Zurapović (BIH), Andris Aunkrogers (LAT), Blaž Zupančič (SLO)

23 February 2025	Italy	67–**71**	**Hungary**	Reggio Calabria
18:30	Scoring by quarter: 10–**13**, 17–**19**, **23**–10, 17–**29**
	Pts: Akele 17; Rebs: Pajola 5 Asts: Pajola 8	Boxscore	Pts: Perl 20; Rebs: Golomán 7 Asts: Vojvoda 5	Arena: PalaCalafiore; Attendance: 7,000; Referees: Marius Ciulin (ROU), Josip Jurčević (CRO), Ilias Kounelles (CYP)

23 February 2025	**Iceland**	**83**–71	Turkey	Reykjavík
19:30	Scoring by quarter: **26**–16, 20–**22**, **23**–16, 14–**17**
	Pts: Hermannsson 23; Rebs: Hlinason 11; Asts: Friðriksson, Steinarsson 5	Boxscore	Pts: Yaşar 16; Rebs: Sipahi 8 Asts: Sipahi 10	Arena: Laugardalshöll; Attendance: 2,300; Referees: Aleksandar Glišić (SRB), Alexandre Deman (FRA), Juozas Barkauskas (LTU)

=== Group C ===
Pos	Team	Pld	W	L	PF	PA	PD	Pts	Qualification
1	Latvia	6	6	0	475	416	+59	**12**	EuroBasket 2025 as host
2	Spain	6	3	3	413	415	−2	**9 (Note: Tied on head-to-head points. Head-to-head points difference: Spain +2, Belgium –2.)**	EuroBasket 2025
3	Belgium	6	3	3	433	395	+38	**9**	EuroBasket 2025
4	Slovakia	6	0	6	386	481	−95	**6**	

Source: FIBA
Rules for classification: 1) Points; 2) Head-to-head; 3) Points difference; 4) Points scored.
Notes:

22 February 2024	Slovakia	60–**75**	**Belgium**	Bratislava
18:00	Scoring by quarter: 13–**25**, **23**–15, 18–**24**, 6–**11**
	Pts: Brodziansky 17; Rebs: Pavelka 9 Asts: Ihring 4	Boxscore	Pts: Obasohan 22; Rebs: Delalieux, Tumba 5 Asts: Obasohan 4	Arena: Gopass Arena; Attendance: 3,068; Referees: Georgios Poursanidis (GRE), Lorenzo Baldini (ITA), Valentin Oliot (FRA)

22 February 2024	Spain	75–**79**	**Latvia**	Zaragoza
20:00	Scoring by quarter: 14–**23**, **23**–17, **20**–17, 18–**22**
	Pts: Brizuela 16; Rebs: Hernangómez 7 Asts: Rubio 5	Boxscore	Pts: Lomažs 18; Rebs: Čavars 7 Asts: Lomažs 7	Arena: Pabellón Príncipe Felipe; Attendance: 10,734; Referees: Ademir Zurapović (BIH), Igor Mitrovski (MKD), Beniamino Attard (ITA)

25 February 2024	**Latvia**	**64**–52	Slovakia	Riga
17:00	Scoring by quarter: **15**–10, 16–**17**, **14**–11, **19**–14
	Pts: Gražulis 18; Rebs: Gražulis 9 Asts: Zoriks 4	Boxscore	Pts: Krajčovič 12; Rebs: Ihring, Mokráň 5 Asts: Ihring 6	Arena: Arena Riga; Attendance: 10,890; Referees: Saverio Lanzarini (ITA), Viola Györgyi (NOR), Alexandre Deman (FRA)

25 February 2024	**Belgium**	**58**–53	Spain	Charleroi
17:30	Scoring by quarter: 11–**14**, 8–**12**, **21**–13, **18**–14
	Pts: Obasohan 19; Rebs: Gillet 8 Asts: Schwartz 4	Boxscore	Pts: Brizuela 14; Rebs: López-Arostegui 7 Asts: Brizuela, Rubio 3	Arena: Dôme; Attendance: 6,500; Referees: Boris Krejić (SLO), Nicolás Maestre (FRA), Carsten Straube (GER)

22 November 2024	Slovakia	72–**76**(2OT)	**Spain**	Bratislava
18:00	Scoring by quarter: 10–**14**, 15–**24**, **21**–10, **13**–11, Overtime: 8–8, 5–**9**
	Pts: Brodziansky 23; Rebs: Brodziansky 10; Asts: Ihring 10	Boxscore	Pts: Yusta 21; Rebs: Yusta 10; Asts: Alocén 5	Arena: Tipos aréna Attendance: 10,046; Referees: Martin Vulić (CRO), Cecília Montgomery-Tóth (HUN), Péter Praksch (HUN)

22 November 2024	**Latvia**	**75**–72	Belgium	Riga
19:00	Scoring by quarter: 17–**25**, **25**–19, **17**–13, **16**–15
	Pts: Zoriks 22; Rebs: Strautiņš 9 Asts: Zoriks 8	Boxscore	Pts: Obasohan 18; Rebs: De Ridder 8 Asts: Obasohan 6	Arena: Arena Riga; Attendance: 8,827; Referees: Ademir Zurapović (BIH), Yener Yılmaz (TUR), Ivor Matějek (CZE)

25 November 2024	**Spain**	**84**–71	Slovakia	Ourense
20:00	Scoring by quarter: **22**–18, **25**–14, 24–**25**, 13–**14**
	Pts: Yusta 25; Rebs: Pradilla 8 Asts: Alocén 7	Boxscore	Pts: Brodziansky 19; Rebs: Malovec 7 Asts: Ihring 8	Arena: Pazo dos Deportes Paco Paz; Attendance: 3,995; Referees: Michał Proc (POL), Igor Mitrovski (MKD), Josip Jurčević (CRO)

25 November 2024	Belgium	83–**85**	**Latvia**	Charleroi
20:15	Scoring by quarter: **20**–16, **21**–20, **25**–22, 17–**27**
	Pts: Lecomte, Obasohan 20; Rebs: Vanwijn, Van Vliet 7 Asts: Obasohan 6	Boxscore	Pts: Lomažs 19; Rebs: Stautins 9 Asts: Lomažs 7	Arena: Dôme; Attendance: 2,500; Referees: Saverio Lanzarini (ITA), Péter Praksch (HUN), Zafer Yılmaz (TUR)

20 February 2025	**Latvia**	**83**–66	Spain	Riga
19:30	Scoring by quarter: **20**–17, **21**–17, **22**–16, **20**–16
	Pts: R. Kurucs 28; Rebs: Gražulis, R. Kurucs 7 Asts: Gražulis 6	Boxscore	Pts: Yusta 15; Rebs: González, López-Arostegui 6 Asts: Villar 3	Arena: Xiaomi Arena; Attendance: 11,135; Referees: Wojciech Liszka (POL), Mihkel Männiste (EST), Ivor Matějek (CZE)

20 February 2025	**Belgium**	**93**–63	Slovakia	Charleroi
20:15	Scoring by quarter: 21–**24**, **25**–13, **23**–10, **24**–16
	Pts: Obasohan 21; Rebs: Obasohan 8 Asts: Obasohan 8	Boxscore	Pts: Brodziansky 19; Rebs: Ihring, Malovec 7 Asts: Ihring 8	Arena: Dôme; Attendance: 2,889; Referees: Marius Ciulin (ROU), Alexandre Deman (FRA), Can Mavisu (TUR)

23 February 2025	Slovakia	68–**89**	**Latvia**	Bratislava
17:00	Scoring by quarter: 15–**20**, 18–**19**, 18–**30**, 17–**20**
	Pts: Ihring, Mokráň 13; Rebs: Malovec 7 Asts: Ihring 7	Boxscore	Pts: Šiliņš 19; Rebs: Laksa 5 Asts: A. Kurucs, Zoriks 5	Arena: Gopass Arena; Attendance: 2,460; Referees: Paulo Marques (POR), Viola Györgyi (NOR), Blaž Zupančič (SLO)

23 February 2025	**Spain**	**59**–52	Belgium	León
17:00	Scoring by quarter: 11–11, 11–**14**, **20**–15, **17**–12
	Pts: López-Arostegui 13; Rebs: Almansa, Guerrero 5 Asts: Saint-Supery 4	Boxscore	Pts: Mwema 21; Rebs: De Ridder 13; Asts: Meeusen 5	Arena: Palacio de los Deportes de León; Attendance: 4,587; Referees: Julio Anaya (PAN), Martin Horozov (BUL), Orhan Hekimoğlu (TUR)

=== Group D ===
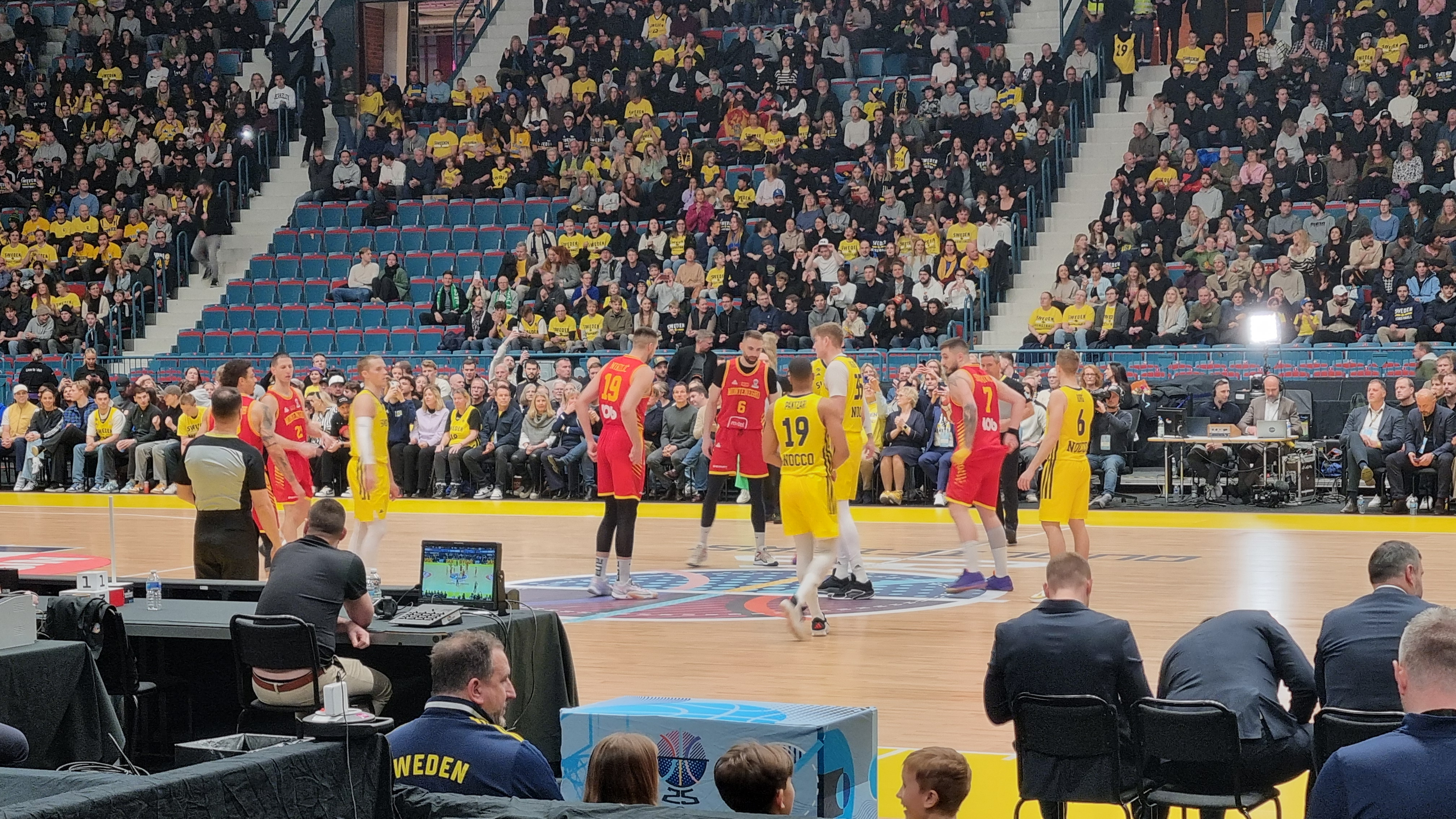
Sweden vs Montenegro in qualifiers for 2025 Eurobasket at Stockholm

Pos	Team	Pld	W	L	PF	PA	PD	Pts	Qualification
1	Germany	6	4	2	488	423	+65	**10**	EuroBasket 2025
2	Montenegro	6	3	3	490	484	+6	**9 (Note: Tied on head-to-head points. Head-to-head points difference: Montenegro +22, Sweden –22.)**	EuroBasket 2025
3	Sweden	6	3	3	451	481	−30	**9**	EuroBasket 2025
4	Bulgaria	6	2	4	451	492	−41	**8**	

Source: FIBA
Rules for classification: 1) Points; 2) Head-to-head; 3) Points difference; 4) Points scored.
Notes:

22 February 2024	**Sweden**	**84**–70	Bulgaria	Partille
19:00	Scoring by quarter: **29**–22, 21–21, 12–12, **22**–15
	Pts: Pantzar 16; Rebs: Gaddefors 9 Asts: Pantzar 5	Boxscore	Pts: Miller-McIntyre 21; Rebs: Minchev 13; Asts: Ivanov 4	Arena: Partille Arena; Attendance: 4,567; Referees: Boris Krejić (SLO), Mihkel Männiste (EST), Ilias Kounelles (CYP)

22 February 2024	**Germany**	**85**–61	Montenegro	Ludwigsburg
19:30	Scoring by quarter: **28**–10, 19–**20**, 11–**20**, **27**–11
	Pts: Da Silva 19; Rebs: Da Silva 7 Asts: Weiler-Babb 5	Boxscore	Pts: Perry 16; Rebs: Nikolić 8 Asts: five players 1	Arena: Arena Ludwigsburg; Attendance: 4,141; Referees: Yohan Rosso (FRA), Paulo Marques (POR), Péter Praksch (HUN)

25 February 2024	**Bulgaria**	**67**–62	Germany	Botevgrad
17:00	Scoring by quarter: 7–**19**, **21**–8, 11–**18**, **28**–17
	Pts: Miller-McIntyre 23; Rebs: four players 5 Asts: Miller-McIntyre 4	Boxscore	Pts: Da Silva 15; Rebs: Da Silva 12; Asts: Da Silva 4	Arena: Arena Botevgrad; Attendance: 4,500; Referees: Marius Ciulin (ROU), Martin Vulić (CRO), Vladimir Jevtović (SRB)

25 February 2024	**Montenegro**	**95**–70	Sweden	Podgorica
19:00	Scoring by quarter: **27**–24, **23**–13, **25**–20, **20**–13
	Pts: Perry 18; Rebs: Simonović 8 Asts: Perry 5	Boxscore	Pts: Njie 15; Rebs: Gaddefors 8 Asts: Borg, Njie 4	Arena: Bemax Arena; Attendance: 5,500; Referees: Antonio Conde (ESP), Andris Aunkrogers (LAT), Valentin Oliot (FRA)

22 November 2024	**Sweden**	**73**–72	Germany	Stockholm
18:30	Scoring by quarter: **26**–18, 11–**19**, 18–**19**, **18**–16
	Pts: Håkanson 22; Rebs: Birgander, Czerapowicz 6 Asts: Njie, Pantzar 3	Boxscore	Pts: Krämer 43; Rebs: Osetkowski 9 Asts: Osetkowski 5	Arena: Hovet; Attendance: 8,906; Referees: Georgios Poursanidis (GRE), Lorenzo Baldini (ITA), Marek Kúkelčík (SVK)

22 November 2024	**Montenegro**	**85**–62	Bulgaria	Podgorica
19:00	Scoring by quarter: **20**–16, **24**–11, 21–**25**, **20**–10
	Pts: Perry 18; Rebs: Simonović 10; Asts: Ivanović 4	Boxscore	Pts: Dimitrov 17; Rebs: Minchev 7 Asts: Young 4	Arena: Bemax Arena; Attendance: 2,318; Referees: Saverio Lanzarini (ITA), Kerem Baki (TUR), Juozas Barkauskas (LTU)

25 November 2024	Bulgaria	86–**90**	**Montenegro**	Botevgrad
19:00	Scoring by quarter: 21–**22**, **27**–19, 19–**25**, 19–**24**
	Pts: P. Ivanov 26; Rebs: Alipiev 6 Asts: P. Ivanov, Young 4	Boxscore	Pts: Perry 31; Rebs: Dubljević 7 Asts: Ivanović, Perry 4	Arena: Arena Botevgrad; Attendance: 2,500; Referees: Georgios Poursanidis (GRE), Lorenzo Baldini (ITA), Marek Kúkelčík (SVK)

25 November 2024	**Germany**	**80**–61	Sweden	Heidelberg
19:30	Scoring by quarter: **23**–19, **18**–12, **19**–17, **20**–13
	Pts: Thiemann 16; Rebs: Thiemann 9 Asts: Kayil, Krämer 4	Boxscore	Pts: Njie 15; Rebs: Gaddefors 6 Asts: Pantzar 5	Arena: SNP Dome; Attendance: 4,380; Referees: Fernando Calatrava (ESP), Yener Yılmaz (TUR), Cecília Montgomery-Tóth (HUN)

20 February 2025	Montenegro	76–**95**	**Germany**	Podgorica
19:00	Scoring by quarter: 17–**26**, 21–**24**, 13–**25**, **25**–20
	Pts: Simonović 22; Rebs: Simonović 7 Asts: Popović 5	Boxscore	Pts: Thiemann 16; Rebs: Pleiß 7 Asts: Hollatz 6	Arena: Bemax Arena; Attendance: 5,233; Referees: Yohan Rosso (FRA), Kerem Baki (TUR), Geert Jacobs (BEL)

20 February 2025	**Bulgaria**	**81**–77(OT)	Sweden	Botevgrad
19:30	Scoring by quarter: **25**–22, 9–**17**, **24**–15, 12–**16**, Overtime: **11**–7
	Pts: Vezenkov 40; Rebs: Vezenkov 18; Asts: Miller-McIntyre 9	Boxscore	Pts: Pantzar 22; Rebs: Birgander 13; Asts: Birgander 5	Arena: Arena Botevgrad; Attendance: 5,000; Referees: Aleksandar Glišić (SRB), Ofer Manheim (ISR), Josip Jurčević (CRO)

23 February 2025	**Sweden**	**86**–83(OT)	Montenegro	Stockholm
17:30	Scoring by quarter: **20**–14, 12–**19**, **21**–18, 19–**21**, Overtime: **14**–11
	Pts: Birgander 19; Rebs: Birgander 12; Asts: three players 4	Boxscore	Pts: Ivanović 26; Rebs: Radebaugh 7 Asts: Ivanović 4	Arena: Hovet; Attendance: 7,985; Referees: Antonio Conde (ESP), Yener Yılmaz (TUR), Dariusz Zapolski (POL),

23 February 2025	**Germany**	**94**–85	Bulgaria	Bamberg
17:30	Scoring by quarter: **28**–21, **34**–14, 13–**22**, 19–**28**
	Pts: Krämer 14; Rebs: Pleiß, Thiemann 6 Asts: three players 3	Boxscore	Pts: P. Ivanov 17; Rebs: Minchev 5 Asts: P. Ivanov 6	Arena: Brose Arena; Attendance: 5,500; Referees: Georgios Poursanidis (GRE), Petar Pešić (SRB), Martin Vulić (CRO)

=== Group E ===
Pos	Team	Pld	W	L	PF	PA	PD	Pts	Qualification
1	France	6	6	0	466	408	+58	**12**	EuroBasket 2025
2	Bosnia and Herzegovina	6	3	3	531	457	+74	**9 (Note: Tied on head-to-head points. Head-to-head points difference: Bosnia and Herzegovina +7, Croatia –7.)**	EuroBasket 2025
3	Croatia	6	3	3	516	472	+44	**9**	
4	Cyprus	6	0	6	387	563	−176	**6**	EuroBasket 2025 as host

Source: FIBA
Rules for classification: 1) Points; 2) Head-to-head; 3) Points difference; 4) Points scored.
Notes:

23 February 2024	Cyprus	66–**99**	**Bosnia and Herzegovina**	Nicosia
19:00	Scoring by quarter: 27–**28**, 11–**23**, 18–**26**, 10–**22**
	Pts: Willis 22; Rebs: Willis 13; Asts: Stylianou 3	Boxscore	Pts: Musa 26; Rebs: Kamenjaš 10; Asts: Atić, Musa 8	Arena: Eleftheria Indoor Hall; Attendance: 3,000; Referees: Martin Horozov (BUL), Ofer Manheim (ISR), Marek Kúkelčík (SVK)

23 February 2024	**France**	**73**–61	Croatia	Brest
20:30	Scoring by quarter: **15**–14, **20**–16, **22**–14, 16–**17**
	Pts: Luwawu-Cabarrot 15; Rebs: Cordinier 6 Asts: Albicy, Inglis 4	Boxscore	Pts: Hezonja 22; Rebs: three players 5 Asts: three players 3	Arena: Brest Arena; Attendance: 5,029; Referees: Wojciech Liszka (POL), Michał Proc (POL), Mehmet Karabilecen (TUR)

26 February 2024	Bosnia and Herzegovina	64–**74**	**France**	Tuzla
19:00	Scoring by quarter: 15–**16**, 17–**18**, 16–**23**, 16–**17**
	Pts: Musa 15; Rebs: Kamenjaš 6 Asts: Musa 3	Boxscore	Pts: Yabusele 16; Rebs: Yabusele 9 Asts: Yabusele 3	Arena: SKPC Mejdan; Attendance: 4,500; Referees: Luis Castillo (ESP), Kerem Baki (TUR), Dariusz Zapolski (POL)

26 February 2024	**Croatia**	**92**–63	Cyprus	Rijeka
20:00	Scoring by quarter: **22**–9, **26**–16, 22–**26**, **22**–13
	Pts: Prkačin 24; Rebs: Hezonja, Prkačin 10; Asts: Kapusta 8	Boxscore	Pts: Simitzis 17; Rebs: Willis 9 Asts: Mantovani, Willis 3	Arena: Centar Zamet; Attendance: 2,500; Referees: Radomir Vojinović (MNE), Ventsislav Velikov (BUL), Can Mavisu (TUR)

21 November 2024	Cyprus	59–**75**	**France**	Nicosia
19:00	Scoring by quarter: 15–**20**, 16–**17**, **19**–14, 9–**24**
	Pts: Simitzis 22; Rebs: Willis 6 Asts: Tigkas 4	Boxscore	Pts: Bouteille, Makoundou 15; Rebs: Makoundou 7 Asts: Benitez 5	Arena: Eleftheria Indoor Hall; Attendance: 1,500; Referees: Ariadna Chueca (ESP), Carsten Straube (GER), Ofer Manheim (ISR)

21 November 2024	**Croatia**	**89**–76	Bosnia and Herzegovina	Zagreb
20:00	Scoring by quarter: **30**–19, 20–**29**, **23**–12, 16–16
	Pts: Božić 25; Rebs: Božić 9 Asts: Smith 4	Boxscore	Pts: Gegić 18; Rebs: Gegić 8 Asts: Atić 6	Arena: Dražen Petrović Basketball Hall; Attendance: 4,000; Referees: Mārtiņš Kozlovskis (LAT), Marius Ciulin (ROU), Gintaras Mačiulis (LTU)

24 November 2024	**France**	**85**–70	Cyprus	Poitiers
17:00	Scoring by quarter: **28**–14, 19–**20**, 21–**24**, **17**–12
	Pts: Bouteille 15; Rebs: Bouteille, Pansa 7 Asts: Benitez 6	Boxscore	Pts: Tigkas, Willis 18; Rebs: Willis 9 Asts: Tigkas 5	Arena: Arena Futuroscope; Attendance: 4,864; Referees: Marius Ciulin (ROU), Viola Györgyi (NOR), Zdenko Tomašovič (SVK)

24 November 2024	**Bosnia and Herzegovina**	**110**–90	Croatia	Sarajevo
18:00	Scoring by quarter: **22**–21, 28–**29**, **33**–13, 27–27
	Pts: Kamenjaš 21; Rebs: Kamenjaš 10; Asts: Musa 5	Boxscore	Pts: Hezonja 28; Rebs: Hezonja 5 Asts: Božić 6	Arena: Skenderija Hall; Attendance: 5,500; Referees: Antonio Conde (ESP), Wojciech Liszka (POL), Gvidas Gedvilas (LTU)

21 February 2025	Croatia	80–**83**	**France**	Zadar
20:00	Scoring by quarter: 17–**20**, **18**–17, 16–**22**, **29**–24
	Pts: Hezonja 37; Rebs: Hezonja 11; Asts: Mavra 4	Boxscore	Pts: Okobo 16; Rebs: Massa 7 Asts: Strazel 5	Arena: Jazine Basketball Hall; Attendance: 2,700; Referees: Manuel Mazzoni (ITA), Mārtiņš Kozlovskis (LAT), Gatis Saliņš (LAT)

21 February 2025	**Bosnia and Herzegovina**	**108**–62	Cyprus	Tuzla
20:00	Scoring by quarter: **28**–14, **25**–25, **29**–21, **26**–12
	Pts: Musa 31; Rebs: Vrabac 8 Asts: Atić 8	Boxscore	Pts: Michail 11; Rebs: Jung 6 Asts: Michail 3	Arena: SKPC Mejdan; Attendance: 4,500; Referees: Saverio Lanzarini (ITA), Gintaras Mačiulis (LTU), Cecília Montgomery-Tóth (HUN)

24 February 2025	Cyprus	67–**104**	**Croatia**	Nicosia
19:00	Scoring by quarter: 14–**26**, 11–**22**, 18–**26**, 24–**30**
	Pts: Simitzis 25; Rebs: Willis 8 Asts: Tigkas 7	Boxscore	Pts: Hezonja 40; Rebs: Hezonja 11; Asts: Hezonja, Smith 7	Arena: Eleftheria Indoor Hall; Attendance: 3,000; Referees: Gvidas Gedvilas (LTU), Andris Aunkrogers (LAT), Mihkel Männiste (EST)

24 February 2025	**France**	**76**–74	Bosnia and Herzegovina	Orléans
21:10	Scoring by quarter: 18–**21**, **16**–11, 17–**25**, **25**–17
	Pts: Makoundou, Strazel 15; Rebs: Cornelie 6 Asts: Okobo 4	Boxscore	Pts: Castañeda 16; Rebs: Kamenjaš 11; Asts: three players 3	Arena: CO'Met; Attendance: 6,769; Referees: Wojciech Liszka (POL), Lorenzo Baldini (ITA), Ivor Matějek (CZE)

=== Group F ===
Pos	Team	Pld	W	L	PF	PA	PD	Pts	Qualification
1	Greece	6	5	1	451	418	+33	**11**	EuroBasket 2025
2	Great Britain	6	4	2	489	477	+12	**10**	EuroBasket 2025
3	Czech Republic	6	2	4	484	494	−10	**8**	EuroBasket 2025
4	Netherlands	6	1	5	439	474	−35	**7**	

Source: FIBA
Rules for classification: 1) Points; 2) Head-to-head; 3) Points difference; 4) Points scored.

23 February 2024	**Great Britain**	**98**–94	Netherlands	Newcastle
19:30	Scoring by quarter: **28**–23, **27**–18, 16–**25**, 27–**28**
	Pts: Hesson 23; Rebs: Wheatle 6 Asts: Nelson 12	Boxscore	Pts: Van der Vuurst de Vries 23; Rebs: Nzekwesi 5 Asts: Van der Vuurst de Vries 9	Arena: Vertu Motors Arena; Attendance: 2,213; Referees: Fernando Calatrava (ESP), Can Mavisu (TUR), Sergio Rodríguez (ESP)

23 February 2024	**Greece**	**72**–64	Czech Republic	Piraeus
21:00	Scoring by quarter: 12–**15**, **20**–16, **21**–19, **19**–14
	Pts: Mitoglou 22; Rebs: Papanikolaou, Walkup 8 Asts: Walkup 8	Boxscore	Pts: Balvín 13; Rebs: Balvín 10; Asts: Bohačík, Satoranský 6	Arena: Peace and Friendship Stadium; Attendance: 12,439; Referees: Luis Castillo (ESP), Gvidas Gedvilas (LTU), Sergii Zashchuk (UKR)

26 February 2024	Netherlands	72–**74**	**Greece**	The Hague
19:30	Scoring by quarter: 12–**16**, **27**–16, 19–**30**, **14**–12
	Pts: Schaftenaar 13; Rebs: Van der Vuurst de Vries 6 Asts: Van der Vuurst de Vries 6	Boxscore	Pts: Toliopoulos 26; Rebs: Kouzeloglou 5 Asts: Toliopoulos 8	Arena: Sportcampus Zuiderpark; Attendance: 3,600; Referees: Manuel Mazzoni (ITA), Péter Praksch (HUN), Igor Mitrovski (MKD)

26 February 2024	**Czech Republic**	**90**–82	Great Britain	Pardubice
20:15	Scoring by quarter: 24–**25**, **25**–22, **19**–15, **22**–20
	Pts: Satoranský 21; Rebs: Balvín 10; Asts: Satoranský 10	Boxscore	Pts: Killeya-Jones 19; Rebs: Killeya-Jones 9 Asts: Wheatle 10	Arena: Enteria arena Attendance: 4,812; Referees: Wojciech Liszka (POL), Yener Yılmaz (TUR), Josip Jurčević (CRO)

21 November 2024	**Czech Republic**	**96**–74	Netherlands	Pardubice
18:00	Scoring by quarter: 21–21, **25**–24, **30**–16, **20**–13
	Pts: Bohačík 18; Rebs: Balvín 9 Asts: Peterka, Sehnal 6	Boxscore	Pts: Van der Vuurst de Vries 20; Rebs: Franke 5 Asts: three players 4	Arena: Enteria arena Attendance: 4,076; Referees: Gatis Saliņš (LAT), Alexandre Deman (FRA), Blaž Zupančič (SLO)

21 November 2024	**Great Britain**	**73**–72	Greece	London
19:30	Scoring by quarter: 16–**26**, **17**–15, **18**–10, **22**–21
	Pts: Olaseni 16; Rebs: Hesson, Olaseni 8 Asts: Ellis 8	Boxscore	Pts: Toliopoulos 14; Rebs: Zougris 8 Asts: Mouratos, Toliopoulos 3	Arena: Copper Box Arena; Attendance: 4,860; Referees: Antonio Conde (ESP), Mihkel Männiste (EST), Valentin Oliot (FRA)

24 November 2024	**Netherlands**	**77**–70	Czech Republic	The Hague
15:00	Scoring by quarter: **25**–10, 12–**17**, **17**–14, 23–**29**
	Pts: Kraag, Van der Vuurst de Vries 13; Rebs: Edwards 6 Asts: Van der Vuurst de Vries 7	Boxscore	Pts: Kyzlink 19; Rebs: Balvín 13; Asts: Balvín, Sehnal 6	Arena: Sportcampus Zuiderpark; Attendance: 3,479; Referees: Ariadna Chueca (ESP), Gintaras Mačiulis (LTU), Valentin Oliot (FRA)

24 November 2024	**Greece**	**77**–67	Great Britain	Pylaia
18:30	Scoring by quarter: **17**–15, **23**–17, 17–**18**, **20**–17
	Pts: Kalaitzakis, Papanikolaou 14; Rebs: Papanikolaou 10; Asts: Papanikolaou 7	Boxscore	Pts: Hesson 14; Rebs: Akin 7 Asts: Ellis 4	Arena: P.A.O.K. Sports Arena; Attendance: 8,200; Referees: Manuel Mazzoni (ITA), Ventsislav Velikov (BUL), Siniša Prpa (SRB)

21 February 2025	Czech Republic	89–**93**(OT)	**Greece**	Pardubice
18:00	Scoring by quarter: 13–**27**, **27**–10, 14–**23**, **23**–17, Overtime: 12–**16**
	Pts: Balvín 19; Rebs: Balvín 8 Asts: Sehnal 9	Boxscore	Pts: Toliopoulos 26; Rebs: Papagiannis 9 Asts: Papagiannis 4	Arena: Enteria arena Attendance: 6,117; Referees: Paulo Marques (POR), Gvidas Gedvilas (LTU), Fernando Calatrava (ESP)

21 February 2025	Netherlands	69–**73**	**Great Britain**	The Hague
19:30	Scoring by quarter: 14–**20**, **15**–11, **21**–18, 19–**24**
	Pts: Franke 22; Rebs: Kraag 9 Asts: Van der Vuurst de Vries 7	Boxscore	Pts: Olaseni 18; Rebs: Olaseni 14; Asts: Ellis 4	Arena: Sportcampus Zuiderpark; Attendance: 3,748; Referees: Lorenzo Baldini (ITA), Petar Pešić (SRB), Viola Györgyi (NOR)

24 February 2025	**Greece**	**63**–53	Netherlands	Patras
19:30	Scoring by quarter: 18–18, **16**–5, 14–**16**, **15**–14
	Pts: Larentzakis 14; Rebs: Zougris 9 Asts: Kalaitzakis 4	Boxscore	Pts: Kraag 14; Rebs: Kraag 8 Asts: Van der Vuurst de Vries 7	Arena: Dimitris Tofalos Arena; Attendance: 4,050; Referees: Luis Castillo (ESP), Michał Proc (POL), Siniša Prpa (SRB)

24 February 2025	**Great Britain**	**96**–75	Czech Republic	Newcastle
19:30	Scoring by quarter: **23**–15, 17–**20**, **32**–18, **24**–22
	Pts: Belo 21; Rebs: three players 4 Asts: Nelson 5	Boxscore	Pts: Hruban 16; Rebs: Husták 7 Asts: Křivánek 6	Arena: Vertu Motors Arena; Attendance: 2,181; Referees: Yohan Rosso (FRA), Saverio Lanzarini (ITA), Geert Jacobs (BEL)

=== Group G ===
Pos	Team	Pld	W	L	PF	PA	PD	Pts	Qualification
1	Serbia	6	6	0	491	376	+115	**12**	EuroBasket 2025
2	Georgia	6	3	3	419	421	−2	**9**	EuroBasket 2025
3	Finland	6	2	4	475	515	−40	**8**	EuroBasket 2025 as host
4	Denmark	6	1	5	400	473	−73	**7**	

Source: FIBA
Rules for classification: 1) Points; 2) Head-to-head; 3) Points difference; 4) Points scored.

23 February 2024	**Denmark**	**75**–69	Georgia	Næstved
18:30	Scoring by quarter: 12–**23**, **16**–14, **22**–16, **25**–16
	Pts: Lundberg 19; Rebs: Knudsen 6 Asts: Lundberg 7	Boxscore	Pts: Shengelia 27; Rebs: Shermadini 8 Asts: Thomasson, Tsintsadze 4	Arena: Næstved Arena; Attendance: 2,153; Referees: Zafer Yılmaz (TUR), Yener Yılmaz (TUR), Juozas Barkauskas (LTU)

23 February 2024	**Serbia**	**77**–61	Finland	Belgrade
20:00	Scoring by quarter: 17–**20**, **19**–14, **22**–17, **19**–10
	Pts: Mitrović 19; Rebs: Mitrović 9 Asts: Petrušev 5	Boxscore	Pts: Jantunen 11; Rebs: Valtonen 9 Asts: Maxhuni 6	Arena: Aleksandar Nikolić Hall; Attendance: 8,000; Referees: Mārtiņš Kozlovskis (LAT), Marius Ciulin (ROU), Dariusz Zapolski (POL)

26 February 2024	**Finland**	**89**–85	Denmark	Espoo
18:30	Scoring by quarter: 23–**27**, 19–**31**, **30**–14, **17**–13
	Pts: Jantunen 19; Rebs: Jantunen 7 Asts: Maxhuni 6	Boxscore	Pts: Lundberg 26; Rebs: Dibba 7 Asts: Larsen, Lundberg 6	Arena: Espoo Metro Areena; Attendance: 5,339; Referees: Fernando Calatrava (ESP), Gintaras Vitkauskas (LTU), Blaž Zupančič (SLO)

26 February 2024	Georgia	63–**76**	**Serbia**	Tbilisi
21:00	Scoring by quarter: 12–**21**, **19**–17, 21–**22**, 11–**16**
	Pts: Shengelia 19; Rebs: Shermadini 9 Asts: Tsintsadze 6	Boxscore	Pts: Gudurić 16; Rebs: Petrušev 8 Asts: Avramović 7	Arena: Tbilisi Sports Palace; Attendance: 9,400; Referees: Yohan Rosso (FRA), Martin Horozov (BUL), Michał Proc (POL)

21 November 2024	Denmark	52–**72**	**Serbia**	Farum
18:00	Scoring by quarter: 6–**29**, 13–**14**, 16–**19**, **17**–10
	Pts: Engelhardt 13; Rebs: Knudsen, Sorensen 5 Asts: four players 3	Boxscore	Pts: Koprivica 13; Rebs: Ristić 6 Asts: Avramović, Jović 6	Arena: Farum Arena; Attendance: 2,993; Referees: Wojciech Liszka (POL), Nicolás Maestre (FRA), Ilias Kounelles (CYP)

21 November 2024	Finland	83–**90**	**Georgia**	Espoo
18:30	Scoring by quarter: **25**–20, 23–23, 15–**19**, 20–**28**
	Pts: Nkamhoua 22; Rebs: Madsen, Nkamhoua 10; Asts: Maxhuni 10	Boxscore	Pts: Shengelia 24; Rebs: Phevadze 7 Asts: Shengelia 5	Arena: Espoo Metro Areena; Attendance: 4,243; Referees: Gvidas Gedvilas (LTU), Ventsislav Velikov (BUL), Zdenko Tomašovič (SVK)

24 November 2024	**Georgia**	**81**–64	Finland	Tbilisi
19:00	Scoring by quarter: 17–**21**, **21**–19, **17**–13, **26**–11
	Pts: Shengelia 25; Rebs: Baldwin 9 Asts: three players 6	Boxscore	Pts: Nkamhoua 11; Rebs: Valtonen 7 Asts: Seppälä 6	Arena: Tbilisi Sports Palace; Attendance: 8,000; Referees: Gatis Saliņš (LAT), Geert Jacobs (BEL), Juozas Barkauskas (LTU)

24 November 2024	**Serbia**	**98**–51	Denmark	Belgrade
20:00	Scoring by quarter: **25**–17, **25**–11, **20**–11, **28**–12
	Pts: Avramović 18; Rebs: Dobrić 8 Asts: Avramović 8	Boxscore	Pts: Lundberg 15; Rebs: Lundberg 6 Asts: Lundberg 6	Arena: Aleksandar Nikolić Hall; Attendance: 6,300; Referees: Paulo Marques (POR), Mihkel Männiste (EST), Orhan Hekimoğlu (TUR)

21 February 2025	Finland	95–**105**	**Serbia**	Espoo
18:30	Scoring by quarter: **26**–24, **31**–27, 14–**28**, 24–**26**
	Pts: Jantunen 18; Rebs: Jantunen 6 Asts: Maxhuni 7	Boxscore	Pts: Petrušev 34; Rebs: Petrušev 8 Asts: Avramović 9	Arena: Espoo Metro Areena; Attendance: 6,146; Referees: Antonio Conde (ESP), Sergii Zashchuk (UKR), Dariusz Zapolski (POL)

21 February 2025	**Georgia**	**62**–60	Denmark	Tbilisi
21:00	Scoring by quarter: 19–**21**, **18**–4, 11–**20**, 14–**15**
	Pts: Shengelia 19; Rebs: Shengelia 13; Asts: Andronikashvili, Shengelia 4	Boxscore	Pts: Larsen 14; Rebs: Berg 8 Asts: Berg 3	Arena: Tbilisi Arena; Attendance: 9,000; Referees: Luis Castillo (ESP), Ventsislav Velikov (BUL), Ilias Kounelles (CYP)

24 February 2025	**Serbia**	**63**–54	Georgia	Belgrade
20:00	Scoring by quarter: 13–**17**, 14–14, **17**–10, **19**–13
	Pts: Avramović 14; Rebs: Beslać, Koprivica 5 Asts: Jović 6	Boxscore	Pts: Burjanadze 17; Rebs: Jintcharadze, Phevadze 7 Asts: Jintcharadze 4	Arena: Aleksandar Nikolić Hall; Attendance: 7,500; Referees: Gatis Saliņš (LAT), Ofer Manheim (ISR), Valentin Oliot (FRA)

24 February 2025	Denmark	77–**83**	**Finland**	Copenhagen
20:00	Scoring by quarter: **25**–24, **22**–17, **23**–18, 7–**24**
	Pts: Larsen 22; Rebs: Larsen 11; Asts: Lundberg 6	Boxscore	Pts: Nkamhoua 26; Rebs: Nkamhoua 8 Asts: Salin 6	Arena: Farum Arena; Attendance: 2,391; Referees: Ariadna Chueca (ESP), Igor Mitrovski (MKD), Péter Praksch (HUN)

=== Group H ===
Pos	Team	Pld	W	L	PF	PA	PD	Pts	Qualification
1	Lithuania	6	5	1	482	391	+91	**11**	EuroBasket 2025
2	Estonia	6	4	2	466	441	+25	**10**	EuroBasket 2025
3	North Macedonia	6	2	4	457	479	−22	**8**	
4	Poland	6	1	5	423	517	−94	**7**	EuroBasket 2025 as host

Source: FIBA
Rules for classification: 1) Points; 2) Head-to-head; 3) Points difference; 4) Points scored.

22 February 2024	**Lithuania**	**83**–64	Poland	Vilnius
19:30	Scoring by quarter: 16–**19**, **19**–11, **27**–19, **21**–15
	Pts: Olisevičius 20; Rebs: Maldūnas 8 Asts: Ulanovas 5	Boxscore	Pts: Sokołowski 26; Rebs: Balcerowski 8 Asts: Ponitka 6	Arena: Avia Solutions Group Arena; Attendance: 5,682; Referees: Manuel Mazzoni (ITA), Radomir Vojinović (MNE), Josip Jurčević (CRO)

23 February 2024	North Macedonia	69–**74**	**Estonia**	Skopje
19:00	Scoring by quarter: **20**–19, **23**–17, 10–**21**, 16–**17**
	Pts: Dimitrijević 25; Rebs: Happ 10; Asts: Dimitrijević, Happ 3	Boxscore	Pts: Kotsar, Vene 16; Rebs: Rosenthal 6 Asts: Jõesaar 5	Arena: SRC Kale; Attendance: 2,000; Referees: Kerem Baki (TUR), Ventsislav Velikov (BUL), Orhan Hekimoğlu (TUR)

26 February 2024	Poland	71–**96**	**North Macedonia**	Sosnowiec
18:00	Scoring by quarter: 16–**25**, 22–22, 12–**22**, 21–**27**
	Pts: Michalak 20; Rebs: Michalak 9 Asts: Pluta 4	Boxscore	Pts: Dimitrijević 32; Rebs: Mekić 10; Asts: Dimitrijević 8	Arena: ArcelorMittal Park; Attendance: 2,894; Referees: Mārtiņš Kozlovskis (LAT), Gatis Saliņš (LAT), Zafer Yılmaz (TUR)

26 February 2024	**Estonia**	**65**–59	Lithuania	Tallinn
19:00	Scoring by quarter: 17–**18**, **24**–19, 9–**13**, **15**–9
	Pts: Jõesaar 18; Rebs: Kotsar 13; Asts: Kullamäe 9	Boxscore	Pts: Ulanovas 16; Rebs: Tubelis 7 Asts: Dimsa, Tubelis 3	Arena: Unibet Arena; Attendance: 6,471; Referees: Sergii Zashchuk (UKR), Franko Gracin (CRO), Ivor Matějek (CZE)

21 November 2024	North Macedonia	67–**82**	**Lithuania**	Skopje
18:00	Scoring by quarter: 9–**23**, 18–**21**, 16–**20**, **24**–18
	Pts: Nikolov 18; Rebs: Maslinko 8 Asts: Nikolov 6	Boxscore	Pts: Echodas 18; Rebs: Tubelis 6 Asts: Žemaitis 5	Arena: SRC Kale; Attendance: 2,500; Referees: Manuel Mazzoni (ITA), Martin Horozov (BUL), Geert Jacobs (BEL)

21 November 2024	Poland	78–**82**	**Estonia**	Włocławek
18:00	Scoring by quarter: 18–**19**, **22**–19, 13–**19**, 25–25
	Pts: Ponitka 23; Rebs: Balcerowski 9 Asts: Sokołowski 7	Boxscore	Pts: Tass 19; Rebs: Kullamäe 6 Asts: Kullamäe 11	Arena: Hala Mistrzów; Attendance: 3,435; Referees: Paulo Marques (POR), Aleksandar Glišić (SRB), Viola Györgyi (NOR)

24 November 2024	Estonia	86–**88**	**Poland**	Tallinn
18:00	Scoring by quarter: **25**–22, 17–**18**, 21–**22**, 23–**26**
	Pts: Kullamäe 21; Rebs: Tass 12; Asts: Kullamäe 6	Boxscore	Pts: Michalak 29; Rebs: Ponitka 8 Asts: Ponitka 3	Arena: Unibet Arena; Attendance: 6,679; Referees: Martin Horozov (BUL), Sergii Zashchuk (UKR), Ilias Kounelles (CYP)

24 November 2024	**Lithuania**	**94**–72	North Macedonia	Klaipėda
19:30	Scoring by quarter: 23–**27**, **20**–19, **21**–16, **30**–10
	Pts: Radzevičius 18; Rebs: Radzevičius 11; Asts: Žemaitis 9	Boxscore	Pts: Dimitrijević 43; Rebs: Dimitrijević 4 Asts: Dimitrijević 6	Arena: Švyturio Arena; Attendance: 4,889; Referees: Mārtiņš Kozlovskis (LAT), Nicolás Maestre (FRA), Carsten Straube (GER)

21 February 2025	Poland	48–**82**	**Lithuania**	Katowice
18:00	Scoring by quarter: **18**–15, 14–**22**, 10–**25**, 6–**20**
	Pts: Kolenda 9 Rebs: Petrasek 8 Asts: three players 2	Boxscore	Pts: Bendžius 18; Rebs: Bendžius 6 Asts: Velička 8	Arena: Spodek; Attendance: 5,683; Referees: Ariadna Chueca (ESP), Zafer Yılmaz (TUR), Orhan Hekimoğlu (TUR)

21 February 2025	**Estonia**	**84**–65	North Macedonia	Tallinn
19:00	Scoring by quarter: **22**–17, 16–**22**, **20**–11, **26**–15
	Pts: Kotsar 16; Rebs: Kotsar, Kullamäe 9 Asts: Kullamäe 9	Boxscore	Pts: Shorts 21; Rebs: Maslinko 7 Asts: Shorts 6	Arena: Unibet Arena; Attendance: 6,774; Referees: Yener Yılmaz (TUR), Zdenko Tomašovič (SVK), Valentin Oliot (FRA)

24 February 2025	**North Macedonia**	**88**–74	Poland	Skopje
18:30	Scoring by quarter: **26**–19, 19–**20**, **22**–16, **21**–19
	Pts: Shorts 23; Rebs: Maslinko, Zekjiri 7 Asts: Dimitrijević 7	Boxscore	Pts: three players 13; Rebs: Pluta 6 Asts: Pluta, Sokołowski 4	Arena: SRC Kale; Attendance: 2,300; Referees: Manuel Mazzoni (ITA), Fernando Calatrava (ESP), Can Mavisu (TUR)

24 February 2025	**Lithuania**	**82**–75	Estonia	Klaipėda
19:30	Scoring by quarter: **28**–19, **32**–24, 7–**21**, **15**–11
	Pts: Radzevičius 19; Rebs: Radzevičius 8 Asts: Velička, Žemaitis 6	Boxscore	Pts: Kotsar 16; Rebs: Konontšuk 8 Asts: Kullamäe 6	Arena: Švyturio Arena; Attendance: 3,919; Referees: Ademir Zurapović (BIH), Sergii Zashchuk (UKR), Cecília Montgomery-Tóth (HUN)

== Qualified teams ==
Team	Qualification method	Date of qualification	Appearance(s)				Previous best performance	World Ranking	
Team	Qualification method	Date of qualification	Total	First	Last	Streak	Previous best performance	Bef	Aft
Cyprus	Host nation	29 March 2022	1st	—	—	1	Debut	78	84
Finland	Host nation	29 March 2022	18th	1939	2022	6	Sixth place (1967)	24	20
Latvia	Host nation	29 March 2022	15th	1935	2017	1	Champions (1935)	29	9
Poland	Host nation	17 September 2022	30th	1937	2022	8	Runners-up (1963)	14	17
Serbia	Group G top two	24 November 2024	8th	2007	2022	8	Runners-up (2009, 2017)	6	2
Lithuania	Group H top two	24 November 2024	16th	1937	2022	14	Champions (1937, 1939, 2003)	8	10
Slovenia	Group A top three	25 November 2024	15th	1993	2022	15	Champions (2017)	7	11
Israel	Group A top three	25 November 2024	31st	1953	2022	15	Runners-up (1979)	34	39
Turkey	Group B top three	25 November 2024	26th	1949	2022	15	Runners-up (2001)	16	27
Italy	Group B top three	25 November 2024	39th	1935	2022	6	Champions (1983, 1999)	10	14
Spain	Group C top two	25 November 2024	33rd	1935	2022	32	Champions (2009, 2011, 2015, 2022)	1	5
Belgium	Group C top two	20 February 2025	19th	1935	2022	6	Fourth place (1947)	30	40
Greece	Group F top three	21 February 2025	29th	1949	2022	18	Champions (1987, 2005)	9	13
Georgia	Group G top two	21 February 2025	6th	2011	2022	6	11th place (2011)	32	24
Estonia	Group H top two	21 February 2025	7th	1937	2022	2	Fifth place (1937, 1939)	44	43
Great Britain	Group F top three	21 February 2025	6th	2009	2022	3	13th place (2009, 2011, 2013)	48	48
Czech Republic	Group F top three	21 February 2025	7th	1999	2022	5	Seventh place (2015)	12	19
France	Group E top two	21 February 2025	40th	1935	2022	23	Champions (2013)	5	4
Bosnia and Herzegovina	Group E top two	21 February 2025	11th	1993	2022	2	Eighth place (1993)	35	41
Portugal	Group A top three	21 February 2025	4th	1951	2011	1	Ninth place (2007)	54	56
Germany	Group D top three	23 February 2025	26th	1951	2022	15	Champions (1993)	11	3
Montenegro	Group D top three	23 February 2025	5th	2011	2022	3	13th place (2017, 2022)	18	16
Sweden	Group D top three	23 February 2025	11th	1953	2013	1	11th place (1995)	50	49
Iceland	Group B top three	23 February 2025	3rd	2015	2017	1	24th place (2015, 2017)	49	50
