= Rolland Török =

Romanian basketball player

No. 14 – CSM Oradea
- Position: Power forward
- League: LN

Personal information
- Born: October 25, 1990 (age 35) Oradea, Romania
- Listed height: 6 ft 8 in (2.03 m)
- Listed weight: 215 lb (98 kg)

Career information
- NBA draft: 2012: undrafted

Career history
- 2012–2013: Jászberényi KSE
- 2013–2015: Egis Körmend
- 2015–2018: U-BT Cluj-Napoca
- 2018–2021: CSU Sibiu
- 2021–2023: CSO Voluntari
- 2023–2024: CSM Constanța
- 2024–present: CSM Oradea

Career highlights
- Liga Națională champion (2017); 3× Romanian Cup champion (2016, 2017, 2022)

Rolland Török (born October 25, 1990) is a Romanian basketball player for CSM Oradea of the Liga Națională and the Romanian national team. He participated at the EuroBasket 2017.

== Awards and accomplishments ==
U BT Cluj-Napoca

- Liga Națională: (2017)
- 2× Romanian Cup: (2016, 2017)

Voluntari

- Romanian Cup: (2022)
