= Borna Kapusta =

Croatian basketball player

No. 3 – Cibona
- Position: Point guard
- League: Premijer liga

Personal information
- Born: 24 July 1996 (age 30) Koprivnica, Croatia
- Listed height: 1.82 m (6 ft 0 in)

Career information
- Playing career: 2012–present

Career history
- 2012–2014: Križevci
- 2014–2015: Zabok
- 2015–2016: Gorica
- 2016–2018: Zabok
- 2018–2022: Gorica
- 2022–2023: Cibona
- 2023–2024: Studentski centar
- 2024–2025: Split
- 2025–2026: Zadar
- 2026–present: Cibona

Career highlights
- 2× Croatian Cup winner (2023, 2025); Montenegrin Cup winner (2024); 2× Croatian League Assists Leader (2021, 2022); Croatian Cup MVP (2023); ABA League Supercup winner (2023)
Medals
Men's basketball
Representing Croatia
FIBA U19 World Championship
Silver medal – second place	2015 Greece	U-19 Team
FIBA U18 Europe Championship
Bronze medal – third place	2014 Turkey	U-18 Team

Borna Kapusta (born 24 July 1996) is a Croatian professional basketball player for Cibona Zagreb of the Croatian Premijer liga. Standing at 1.82 m (6' 0"), he plays at the point guard position.

== Professional career ==
At the start of season 2016–17 he moved to Zabok from Gorica, where he would reside for the next two seasons. In August 2018 he returned in Gorica. In January 2020, with Gorica he beat the favorite Cibona, making 6 points, 3 rebounds and 11 assist.

On 20 September 2023, Kapusta and SC Derby won the ABA League Supercup after he scored a game-winner with 4.6 seconds on the clock. Kapusta's shot gave Derby the advantage over Partizan to give the team the 83–81 win.

== National team career ==
Kapusta was a member of the Croatia under-18 team that took 3rd place at the 2014 FIBA Europe Under-18 Championship.

In the summer of 2015, Kapusta played with the Croatia under-19 team that won the silver medal at the 2015 FIBA Under-19 World Championship held in Heraklion.
