= Danko Branković =

Croatian basketball player (born 2000)

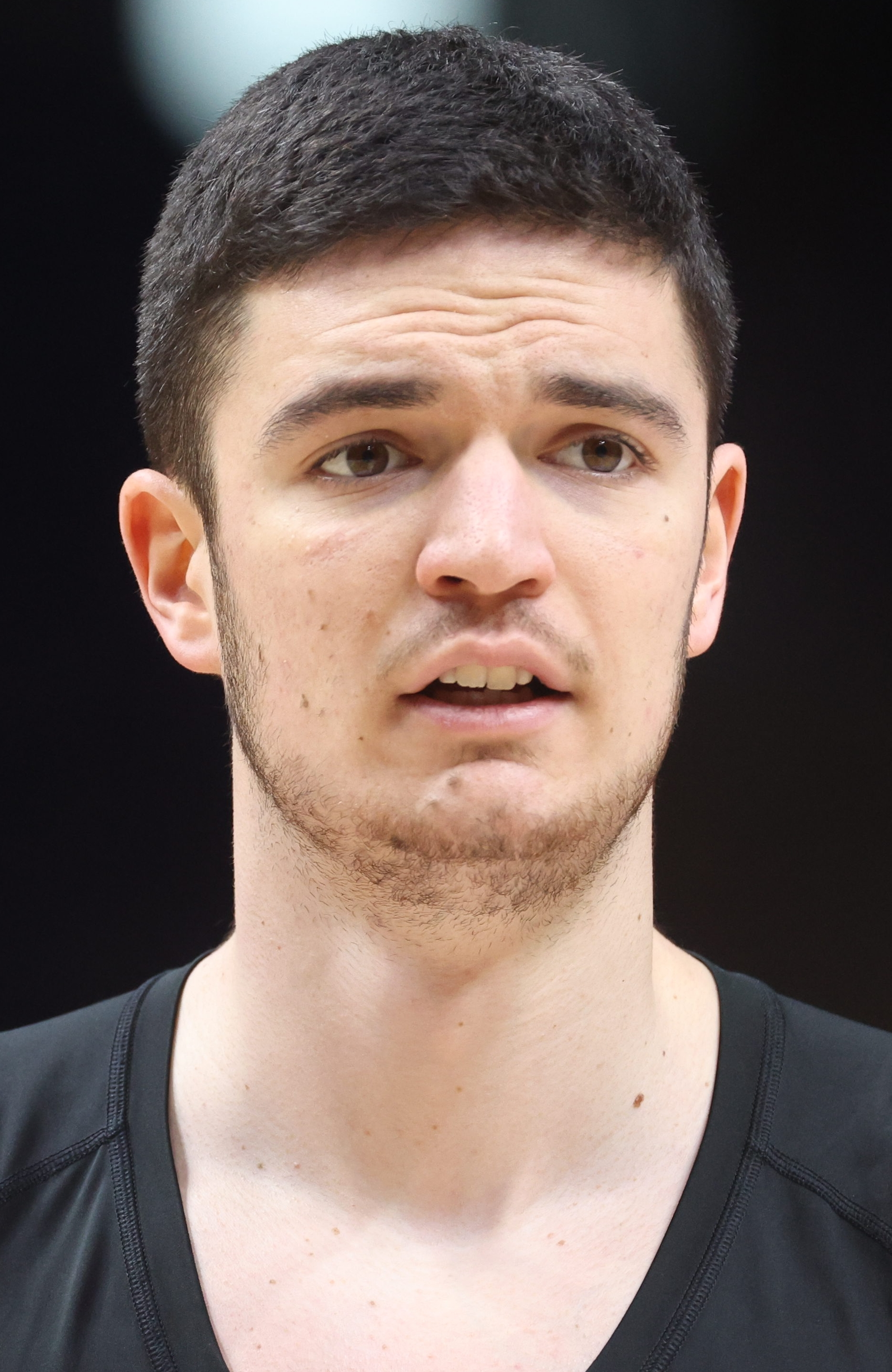
- Brankovic with Bayern Munich in 2025

No. 22 – Río Breogán
- Position: Center
- League: Liga ACB

Personal information
- Born: 5 November 2000 (age 26) Zagreb, Croatia
- Listed height: 2.17 m (7 ft 1 in)
- Listed weight: 108 kg (238 lb)

Career information
- NBA draft: 2022: undrafted
- Playing career: 2019–present

Career history
- 2019–2022: Cibona
- 2020: →Dubrava
- 2022–2025: Bayern Munich
- 2022–2023: →Mega Basket
- 2025–present: Breogán

Career highlights
- 2× Bundesliga champion (2024, 2025); German Cup winner (2024); ABA League blocks leader (2023); Croatian League champion (2022); Croatian Cup winner (2022); Croatian Cup MVP (2022); Junior ABA League champion (2019)

Danko Branković (born 5 November 2000) is a Croatian professional basketball player for Rio Breogán of the Spanish Liga ACB. Standing at 2.17 m and weighing 238 pounds (108 kg), he plays center position.

== Professional career ==
Branković grew up in the youth selections of Cibona, where he also started his professional career. In September 2020, he was loaned out to Dubrava for which he played in 11 matches in the Croatian League while still playing for Cibona in the ABA League. Branković attracted attention of the media during the off-season 2021 Liburnia Cup held in Opatija. In the competition of Cedevita Olimpija, Partizan and Pesaro, Cibona won the tournament and Branković was named MVP. In February 2022, Cibona won the Croatian Cup and Branković was named the MVP.

On 4 July 2022, Branković signed with Bayern Munich of the Basketball Bundesliga (BBL). On 31 July, he was loan out to Serbian club Mega Basket for two seasons.

On July 8, 2025, he signed with Rio Breogán of the Spanish Liga ACB.

== National team career ==
Branković played for the Croatian national youth system. He was a member of rosters that competed at the 2016 FIBA U16 European Championship, 2018 FIBA U18 European Championship and 2019 FIBA U20 European Championship.

In November 2021, Branković debuted for the Croatian A team at the 2023 FIBA Basketball World Cup qualification game against Slovenia.

== Career statistics ==
Legend
GP	Games played	GS	Games started	MPG	Minutes per game
FG%	Field-goal percentage	3P%	3-point field-goal percentage	FT%	Free-throw percentage
RPG	Rebounds per game	APG	Assists per game	SPG	Steals per game
BPG	Blocks per game	PPG	Points per game	PIR	Performance index rating
**Bold**	Career high

=== EuroLeague ===
Year	Team	GP	GS	MPG	FG%	3P%	FT%	RPG	APG	SPG	BPG	PPG	PIR
2023–24	Bayern Munich	25	5	10.0	.625	.444	.857	2.5	.4	.4	.4	4.2	4.9
Career		25	5	10.0	.625	.444	.857	2.5	.4	.4	.4	4.2	4.9

=== Domestic leagues ===
Year	Team	League	GP	MPG	FG%	3P%	FT%	RPG	APG	SPG	BPG	PPG
2019–20	(Croatia) Cibona	Premijer liga	1	4.8	.250	—	—	1.0	—	—	—	2.0
2020–21	(Croatia) Furnir	Premijer liga	11	21.5	.680	.000	.652	5.9	1.2	.9	1.5	10.6
2020–21	(Croatia) Cibona	Premijer liga	21	14.2	.660	.500	.676	3.9	.9	.5	.9	7.3
2020–21	(Croatia) Cibona	ABA	14	7.4	.625	.500	.833	1.1	.1	.1	.4	2.6
2021–22	(Croatia) Cibona	Premijer liga	41	18.4	.704	.700	.831	5.1	.7	.6	1.6	9.8
2021–22	(Croatia) Cibona	ABA	25	17.6	.641	.364	.650	5.0	.6	.5	1.1	9.9
2022–23	(Serbia) Mega	KLS	6	29.5	.745	.833	.700	10.5	1.3	.7	1.8	16.8
2022–23	(Serbia) Mega	ABA	25	25.7	.626	.231	.760	6.0	1.0	.5	1.9	12.7
2023–24	(Germany) Bayern Munich	BBL	24	12.4	.634	.700	.729	2.9	.6	.3	.4	6.7
