= Kris Richard (basketball) =

Romanian basketball player (born 1989)

No. 0 – CSM Oradea
- Position: Guard
- League: LN

Personal information
- Born: 1 March 1989 (age 37) Beaumont, Texas, U.S.
- Listed height: 1.96 m (6 ft 5 in)

Career information
- College: Tulane (2007–2011)
- NBA draft: 2011: undrafted
- Playing career: 2011–present

Career history
- 2011–2012: Halcones de Xalapa
- 2012–2015: Kaspiy Aktau
- 2015-2016: Liepāja/Triobet
- 2016–2017: VEF Rīga
- 2017: Tigers Tübingen
- 2018–2020: CSM Oradea
- 2020–2021: Zielona Góra
- 2021: SIG Strasbourg
- 2021–present: CSM Oradea

Career highlights
- 2× Romanian League champion (2018, 2019)

Kristopher Jameill Richard (born 1 March 1989) is a US-born Romanian professional basketball player for CSM Oradea of the Liga Națională.

== Professional career ==
Before he came to Romania, he played professionally in Germany for Tigers Tübingen. In 2018, Richard signed with CSM Oradea of the Liga Națională. During the 2019-20 season, he averaged 14 points per game. He signed with Stelmet Zielona Góra of the PLK and the VTB United League on October 19, 2020.

On May 22, 2021, he has signed with SIG Strasbourg of the French Pro A.

On July 2, 2021, he has signed with CSM Oradea of the Liga Națională.

== Personal ==
Richard states that in his spare time, he enjoys fishing, golfing, and traveling.
