= Konstantinos Simitzis =

Cypriot basketball player

Vikos Falcons
- Position: Shooting guard / Point guard
- League: Greek Elite League

Personal information
- Born: 12 August 1995 (age 31) Athens, Greece
- Listed height: 6 ft 0.3 in (1.84 m)

Career information
- Playing career: 2014–present

Career history
- 2014–2015: Peristeri
- 2015–2016: KAO Korinthos
- 2016–2017: Niki Amaroussiou
- 2017–2018: Koropi
- 2018–2019: Mandraikos
- 2019–2021: Oiakas Nafpliou
- 2021–2023: APOEL
- 2023–2025: AEK Larnaca
- 2025–present: Vikos Falcons

Career highlights
- ̈Cypriot League champion (2025); Cypriot Super Cup winner (2023); 2x Cypriot League All-Star (2022, 2024); Cypriot League All-Star Game MVP (2022)

Konstantinos Simitzis (born August 12, 1995) is a Greek-Cypriot professional basketball player for Vikos Falcons Ioannina of the Greek Elite League.

== Professional career ==
After playing in the lower divisions of the Greek Basketball Leagues with Peristeri, KAO Korinthos, Niki Amaroussiou, Koropi and Mandraikos, Simitzis joined Oiakas Nafpliou of the Greek A2 Basket League.

After staying two years with the club and being one of its leaders, Simitzis moved to Cyprus and joined APOEL of the Cypriot League. After two successful seasons with APOEL, he moved to AEK Larnaca.

On October 3, 2025, Simitzis returned to Greece and joined Vikos Falcons. of the Greek Elite League.

== National team career ==
Simitzis has been a member of the Cyprus national team since 2022, after receiving a Cypriot citizenship. He was included to the squad for the EuroBasket 2025.
