= Taiwo Badmus =

British/Irish basketball player

Tindastóll
- Position: Small forward
- League: Úrvalsdeild karla

Personal information
- Born: 3 July 1993 (age 33)
- Listed height: 2.00 m (6 ft 7 in)
- Listed weight: 92 kg (203 lb)

Career information
- High school: Hackney College (London, England)
- College: Fairmont State (2014–2016); Virginia–Wise (2016–2018)
- Playing career: 2018–present

Career history
- 2018–2020: CB Marín Peixegalego
- 2020–2021: Básquet Coruña
- 2021–2023: Tindastóll
- 2023: Luiss Roma
- 2023–2025: Valur
- 2025–present: Tindastóll

Career highlights
- 2× Icelandic champion (2023, 2024); Icelandic Basketball Cup (2025); Úrvalsdeild Playoffs MVP (2024); Icelandic Cup MVP (2025); LEB Plata Playoff MVP (2018, 2019); All-Atlantic Region Second Team (2017, 2018); 2× All-Conference First Team (2017, 2018); 2× Virginia All-State First Team (2017, 2018)

Taiwo Hassan Badmus (born 3 July 1993) is a British/Irish professional basketball player. He played college basketball in the United States for Fairmont State University and University of Virginia's College at Wise. He is also a member of the Ireland national basketball team and represented them in the FIBA European Championships in the summer of 2018. In 2023, he helped Tindastóll to its first ever Icelandic championship.

== College career ==
=== Fairmont State 2014–2016 ===
Two years at Fairmont State, his team went to two NCAA tournaments. Ranked #2 in the country for 10 weeks and ranked top 5 for 16 straight weeks, finished the year as #8 at NABC poll.

=== Virginia–Wise 2016–2018 ===
Taiwo Badmus averaged a double double of 22 points and 10.5 rebounds per game for two years in a row at UVa-Wise. He led his team to two conference tournament appearances in his two years there.

=== College awards ===
All Atlantic Region Second Team, All Conference First Team and Virginia Sports Information Directors (VaSID) All-State First Team. He received Conference Player of the week 6 times. Taiwo was also voted as UVa-Wise's Male Athlete of the year his senior year.

== Professional career ==
After his college career he signed with CB Marín Peixegalego (LEB Plata) in Spain. As a starter, he averaged 13.4 points per game, 7 rebounds per game, and 1.2 steals per game. He earned MVP of the week once, led his team to and won the playoffs resulting in promotion of his team. He averaged 21.5 points in the playoffs naming him the playoff MVP.

As a starter and the team's leading scorer, Taiwo Badmus averaged 13 points, 6 rebounds, 1 steal and 1 assist per game, playing 23 games with CB Marín Peixegalego (LEB Oro) in Spain, during the 2019-2020 Spain - LEB Gold regular-season. He set his season-high with 25 points in 32 minutes against Real Canoe Madrid on 3 November 2019. He grabbed a season-high 15 rebounds in 33 minutes against Coruña on 1 March 2020. He dished a season-high 2 assists in 33 minutes against Real Canoe Madrid on 6 March 2020. He earned MVP of the week twice this season.

In June 2021, Badmus signed with Tindastóll of the Icelandic Úrvalsdeild karla and helped the team to the 2022 Úrvalsdeild finals where they lost to Valur 2–3.

In 2023, he won his first Icelandic championship after Tindastóll defeated Valur 3–2 in a finals rematch.

During the summer of 2023, Badmus signed with Serie A2 club Luiss Roma.

In December 2023, Badmus signed with Valur of the Úrvalsdeild. In May 2024, he won the national championship with Valur and was named the Finals MVP.

On 22 March 2025, he won the Icelandic Cup after Valur defeated KR in the Cup finals, 96–78.

After two seasons with Valur, Badmus rejoined Tindastóll in June 2025.

== National team career ==
From 2018, Badmus is a member of the Ireland National Basketball Team. He participated at the FIBA European Championship for Small Countries 2018 and was one of the best players for Ireland and for the tournament. Badmus led his team to a bronze medal, averaging 14 points, 7 rebounds, 2 steals and 2 blocks per game throughout the tournament, also receiving the MVP Top 5 All-star award of the tournament.
