= 2019–20 BLNO season =

BLNO
- Teams: 10

The 2019–20 BLNO was the 20th season of the Basketball League of Norway since its establishment. Kongsberg Miners were the defending champions.

On 11 March 2020, the season was ended prematurely due to the coronavirus pandemic.

== Format ==
The ten participating teams first played the regular season, that consisted in a round-robin schedule containing three rounds with every team playing each opponent at least once home and once away for a total of 27 matches.

At the end of the regular season, the top eight teams qualified for the playoffs.

== Teams ==
Locations of the teams in 2019–20 BLNO

Team	City	Arena
Ammerud	Oslo	Apallokka
Asker Aliens	Asker	Vollenhallen
Bærum	Bærum	Rykkinnhallen
Centrum Tigers	Oslo	Vulkanhallen
Frøya	Bergen	Frøya Idrettspark
Fyllingen	Bergen	Framohallen
Gimle	Bergen	Gimlehallen
Kongsberg Miners	Kongsberg	Kongsberghallen
Nidaros Jets	Trondheim	Husebyhallen
Tromsø Storm	Tromsø	Tromsøhallen

== Regular season ==
=== Standings ===
Pos	Team	Pld	W	L	PF	PA	PD	Pts	Qualification
1	Kongsberg Miners	27	26	1	2592	2038	+554	52	Qualification to playoffs
2	Bærum	27	19	8	2323	2160	+163	38	Qualification to playoffs
3	Fyllingen	27	17	10	2360	2284	+76	34	Qualification to playoffs
4	Gimle	27	17	10	2323	2209	+114	34	Qualification to playoffs
5	Frøya	27	16	11	2466	2350	+116	32	Qualification to playoffs
6	Tromsø Storm	27	13	14	2408	2384	+24	26	Qualification to playoffs
7	Centrum Tigers	27	9	18	2070	2291	−221	18	Qualification to playoffs
8	Asker Aliens	27	8	19	2079	2192	−113	16	Qualification to playoffs
9	Ammerud	27	7	20	2164	2401	−237	14	Qualification to relegation playoffs
10	Nidaros Jets	27	3	24	2007	2483	−476	6	Qualification to relegation playoffs

Source: BLNO

=== Results ===
Home \ Away	AMM	ASK	BAE	CEN	FRO	FYL	GIM	KON	NID	TRO	AMM	ASK	BAE	CEN	FRO	FYL	GIM	KON	NID	TRO
Ammerud	—	77–72	81–97	82–80	64–75	78–87	100–87	80–86	83–75	86–89	—	76–94	—	77–83	—	—	—	87–105	77–65	—
Asker Aliens	84–75	—	57–76	74–65	74–90	86–73	72–79	76–101	105–68	61–84	—	—	74–54	—	86–84	—	73–83	84–93	—	—
Bærum	95–86	83–76	—	110–71	97–90	80–96	87–77	60–91	82–72	87–69	103–76	—	—	100–87	99–85	92–84	—	—	—	81–80
Centrum Tigers	80–73	67–48	64–84	—	80–94	80–85	68–101	98–109	87–70	70–66	—	70–62	—	—	—	—	71–100	78–91	83–72	—
Frøya	91–70	104–84	80–114	71–81	—	93–74	125–129	68–92	88–77	104–96	97–88	—	—	101–63	—	91–81	—	—	83–75	112–105
Fyllingen	83–77	102–92	90–79	87–81	91–90	—	89–78	83–88	93–69	102–86	86–76	99–83	—	84–83	—	—	—	—	102–73	86–94
Gimle	75–83	81–73	66–96	75–59	81–80	65–71	—	82–98	114–53	87–82	109–76	—	70–82	—	83–93	109–86	—	—	—	91–80
Kongsberg Miners	100–74	75–64	110–66	89–53	99–74	87–81	94–57	—	111–56	98–64	—	—	92–65	—	91–89	103–93	80–89	—	—	102–87
Nidaros Jets	82–89	81–74	88–83	83–86	79–109	70–83	86–92	81–111	—	81–100	—	72–73	58–91	—	—	—	81–90	79–101	—	—
Tromsø Storm	110–85	96–95	90–80	105–103	97–105	101–89	71–73	70–95	85–87	—	111–88	84–83	—	98–79	—	—	—	—	108–74	—

Source: BLNO
Legend: Blue = home team win; Red = away team win.

== Playoffs ==
The playoffs were played in a best-of-three games format. During the quarterfinals, the league was cancelled because of the COVID-19 pandemic.

=== Bracket ===
Quarter-finals
Kongsberg Miners	1
Asker Aliens	1
Gimle BBK	2
Frøya	0
Bærum	2
Centrum Tigers	0
Fyllingen	2
Tromsø Storm	0

Semi-finals
Cancelled
Gimle BBK
Cancelled
Bærum
Fyllingen

Final
Cancelled

=== Quarter-finals ===
Team 1	Series	Team 2	Game 1	Game 2	Game 3
Kongsberg Miners	1–1	Asker Aliens	80–78	84–67	Cancelled
Bærum	2–0	Centrum Tigers	91–75	99–69	
Fyllingen	2–0	Tromsø Storm	86–79	110–85	
Gimle	2–0	Frøya	87–75	80–92	

=== Semi-finals ===
Team 1	Series	Team 2	Game 1	Game 2	Game 3
	Cancelled	Gimle			
Bærum	Cancelled	Fyllingen			

=== Finals ===
Team 1	Series	Team 2	Game 1	Game 2	Game 3
	Cancelled				
