= 2020–21 BLNO season =

BLNO
- Teams: 10

The 2020–21 BLNO is the 21st season of the Basketball League of Norway.

== Format ==
The ten participating teams first played the regular season, that consisted in a round-robin schedule containing three rounds with every team playing each opponent at least once home and once away for a total of 27 matches.

At the end of the regular season, the top eight teams qualifyfor the playoffs.

== Teams ==
Locations of the teams in 2020-21 BLNO

Team	City	Arena
Ammerud	Oslo	Apallokka
Asker Aliens	Asker	Vollenhallen
Bærum	Bærum	Rykkinnhallen
Centrum Tigers	Oslo	Vulkanhallen
Frøya	Bergen	Frøya Idrettspark
Fyllingen	Bergen	Framohallen
Gimle	Bergen	Gimlehallen
Kongsberg Miners	Kongsberg	Kongsberghallen
Nidaros Jets	Trondheim	Husebyhallen
Tromsø Storm	Tromsø	Tromsøhallen

== Regular season ==
=== Standings ===
Pos	Team	Pld	W	L	P+/-	%
1	Gimle	16	13	3	208	0.813
2	Kongsberg Miners	15	12	3	205	0.800
3	Frøya	16	12	4	50	0.750
4	Bærum	16	10	6	117	0.625
5	Asker Aliens	15	9	6	86	0.600
6	Fyllingen	18	9	9	89	0.500
7	Tromsø Storm	16	7	9	-3	0.438
8	Ammerud	16	5	11	-58	0.313
9	Nidaros Jets	14	2	12	-308	0.143
10	Centrum Tigers	18	1	17	-386	0.056
