= Torgrim Sommerfeldt =

Norwegian basketball player (born 1989)

No. 8 – Kongsberg Miners
- Position: Small forward

Personal information
- Born: 26 June 1989 (age 37) Drammen, Norway
- Listed height: 6 ft 6 in (1.98 m)
- Listed weight: 210 lb (95 kg)

Career information
- College: Manhattan (2011–2012)
- Playing career: 2012–present

Career history
- 2012–2013: Bærum Basket
- 2013–2014: Asker Aliens
- 2014–2015: Aris Leeuwarden
- 2015–2017: Centrum Tigers
- 2017–2018: Asker Aliens
- 2018–2020: Bærum Basket
- 2020–2021: Asker Aliens
- 2021–present: Kongsberg Miners

Torgrim Sommerfeldt (born 26 June 1989) is a former Norwegian professional basketball player for the Kongsberg Miners of the Basketligaen Norge and LWD Basket (Aris Leeuwarden, The Netherlands). He played collegiately for the Manhattan Jaspers. He played on the norwegian national team over several years and is a three-time winner of the Norwegian trophy Kongepokalen.

Torgrim is son of the former basketball players Harald Sommerfeldt and Eli Sommerfeldt. They both played on the national basketball team for Norway. His three siblings were on the national track and field team in the multi events (Decathlon and heptathlon).

Torgrim Sommerfeldt is a Norwegian basketball player known for his contributions to Norwegian and international basketball. Sommerfeldt began his career at Krokstad Basket, where he played under the guidance of his uncle, who served as his coach. His basketball journey then continued to Drammen Basket in the 2nd division. In a remarkable season when he was 14 years old, Sommerfeldt shared the court with family members, including his father, uncle, and cousin.

Sommerfeldt continued his education at the Norwegian College of Elite Sports (NTG) in Bærum, where he represented Sandvika in basketball and achieved the position of a national team player at the age of 17. Despite his early success, Sommerfeldt faced challenges with knee problems, especially after overtraining. These issues were exacerbated during the Junior World Championships in Sofia, Bulgaria, where he experienced significant pain as a result of the injuries.

Despite his injury challenges, Sommerfeldt became the first Norwegian player to be selected for the "World Team," a team consisting of prominent junior players from across Europe. This marked a significant moment in Norwegian basketball history, as it was remarkable for a player from Norway to receive this recognition. Sommerfeldt's performances on the court attracted attention from scouts from American universities and colleges, as well as the NBA Jaspers, leading him to ultimately pursue his education and basketball career at Manhattan College in the USA.

During his time in the USA, Sommerfeldt continued to battle injuries, which led to his participation in an experimental stem cell treatment program. The treatment, which involved injections of stem cells taken from the abdomen into the knee, proved to be successful and was featured in The New York Times.

After his time in the USA, Sommerfeldt returned to Europe where he continued his career in the Netherlands before achieving further success in Norway by winning Kongepokalen (officially: Hans Majestet Kongens Pokal, a Norwegian trophy awarded during Norwegian championships in a number of sports) with Asker Basket, Centrum Basket, and Bærum Basket. At Manhattan College, he also met Kevin Lau, a one-armed basketball player who had received a scholarship to play for a 1st division team. Together, Sommerfeldt and Lau participated in exhibition tours in countries including China and Taiwan, where they promoted basketball and demonstrated that anything is possible with faith and determination.

Sommerfeldt concluded his active career by playing for Kongsberg, where he had also played as a junior before beginning at NTG in Bærum. Throughout his career, Sommerfeldt is known for his contributions to Norwegian basketball, as well as his personal journey through challenges and successes on and off the basketball court.
