= Norway men's national basketball team =

Norway
- FIBA ranking: 83 ▲1 (1 September 2026)
- Joined FIBA: 1968
- FIBA zone: FIBA Europe
- National federation: NBBF
- Coach: Susie Heede-Andersen

FIBA World Cup
- Appearances: None

EuroBasket
- Appearances: None

Championship for Small Countries
- Appearances: 2
- Medals: (silver) Silver: (1996, 2018)
Home	Away

First international
- Norway 50–63 Denmark (Oslo, Norway; 11 February 1967)

Biggest win
- San Marino 48–88 Norway (Serravalle, San Marino; 26 June 2018)

Biggest defeat
- Iceland 123–59 Norway (Reykjavík, Iceland; 15 April 1968)

The Norway men's national basketball team (Norwegian: Norges herrelandslag i basketball) represents Norway in international basketball tournaments. The national team is administered by the Norwegian Basketball Federation.

Norway has never had great success on the international stage in the past. They are one of the few European countries to date to have never qualified for one of the top international basketball competitions, such as the EuroBasket or the FIBA World Cup.

== History ==
Norway's first international match was played on 11 February 1967 in Oslo, where the team lost 50–63 to Denmark. The most capped player is Torgeir Bryn, with 111 caps.

In the past, Norway has attempted to qualify for the EuroBasket several times, but have yet to reach the tournament. They have only entered the Olympic basketball qualification twice, for the 1980, and 1988 Olympic Games. Norway is one of Europe's most populous nations to have never qualified for a major international basketball competition. However, they have competed at smaller events such as the European Championship for Small Countries.

=== The Road to Revival (2012–2017) ===
In 2012, financial troubles led the Norwegian Basketball Federation to shut down both the men's and women's national teams. The federation simply did not have the funds to keep either the men's or women's teams afloat. Since then, however, the federation has come to realize just how many people from the athletes and teams, to individuals and companies care about the Norwegian basketball community and are willing to provide financial support. The federation also worked to raise money through sponsorships, and eventually signed a major sponsorship agreement with Circle K, in addition to a few smaller sponsors.

=== Norway's return (2018–present) ===
In 2018, Norway made its return to FIBA competition by playing at the European Championship for Small Countries. The national team finished as the runners-up after losing 75–59 in the final against Malta.

In 2021, Norway joined the EuroBasket 2025 qualification.

== Competitive record ==
=== FIBA World Cup ===
World Cup					Qualification		
Year	Position	Pld	W	L	Pld	W	L
1950 to 1967	No national representative						
(Socialist Federal Republic of Yugoslavia) 1970	Did not enter				Did not enter		
(Puerto Rico) 1974	Did not enter				Did not enter		
(Philippines) 1978	Did not enter				Did not enter		
(Colombia) 1982	Did not qualify				Did not qualify		
(Spain) 1986	Did not enter				Did not enter		
(Argentina) 1990	Did not qualify				EuroBasket served as qualifiers		
(Canada) 1994	Did not qualify				EuroBasket served as qualifiers		
(Greece) 1998	Did not qualify				EuroBasket served as qualifiers		
(United States) 2002	Did not qualify				EuroBasket served as qualifiers		
(Japan) 2006	Did not enter				Did not enter		
(Turkey) 2010	Did not enter				Did not enter		
(Spain) 2014	Did not enter				Did not enter		
(China) 2019	Did not enter				Did not enter		
(Philippines) (Japan) (Indonesia) 2023	Did not enter				Did not enter		
(Qatar) 2027	Did not qualify				8	2	6
(France) 2031	To be determined				To be determined		
Total	0/15				8	2	6

=== Olympic Games ===
Olympic Games					Qualifying		
Year	Position	Pld	W	L	Pld	W	L
1936 to 1964	No national representative						
(Mexico) 1968	Did not enter				Did not enter		
(West Germany) 1972	Did not enter				Did not enter		
(Canada) 1976	Did not enter				Did not enter		
(Soviet Union) 1980	Did not qualify				4	0	4
(United States) 1984	Did not enter				Did not enter		
(South Korea) 1988	Did not qualify				3	0	3
(Spain) 1992	Did not enter				Did not enter		
1996 to 2024	Did not enter				Did not enter		
(United States) 2028	To be determined				To be determined		
Total	0/15				7	0	7

=== Championship for Small Countries ===
FIBA European Championship for Small Countries
Year	Position	Pld	W	L
(San Marino) 1996	2nd place, silver medalist(s)	5	4	1
(San Marino) 2018	2nd place, silver medalist(s)	5	4	1
Total		10	8	2

=== EuroBasket ===
EuroBasket					Qualification		
Year	Position	Pld	W	L	Pld	W	L
1935 to 1967	No national representative						
(Italy) 1969	Did not enter				Did not enter		
(West Germany) 1971	Did not enter				Did not enter		
(Spain) 1973	Did not enter				Did not enter		
(Socialist Federal Republic of Yugoslavia) 1975	Did not enter				Did not enter		
(Belgium) 1977	Did not enter				Did not enter		
(Italy) 1979	Did not qualify				3	0	3
(Czechoslovakia) 1981	Did not qualify				4	1	3
(France) 1983	Did not enter				Did not enter		
(West Germany) 1985	Did not qualify				9	5	4
(Greece) 1987	Did not qualify				4	3	1
(Socialist Federal Republic of Yugoslavia) 1989	Did not qualify				3	0	3
(Italy) 1991	Did not qualify				4	1	3
(Germany) 1993	Did not qualify				4	0	4
(Greece) 1995	Did not enter				Did not enter		
(Spain) 1997	Did not qualify				5	0	5
(France) 1999	Did not qualify				3	0	3
(Turkey) 2001	Did not qualify				9	3	6
(Sweden) 2003	Did not enter				Did not enter		
(Serbia and Montenegro) 2005	Did not enter				Did not enter		
(Spain) 2007	Did not enter				Did not enter		
(Poland) 2009	Did not enter				Did not enter		
(Lithuania) 2011	Did not enter				Did not enter		
(Slovenia) 2013	Did not enter				Did not enter		
(France) (Croatia) (Germany) (Latvia) 2015	Did not enter				Did not enter		
(Finland) (Israel) (Romania) (Turkey) 2017	Did not enter				Did not enter		
(Czech Republic) (Georgia (country)) (Italy) (Germany) 2022	Did not enter				Did not enter		
(Cyprus) (Finland) (Poland) (Latvia) 2025	Did not qualify				14	6	8
(Estonia) (Greece) (Slovenia) (Spain) 2029	Qualification in progress				5	3	2
Total	0/27				67	22	45

== Results and fixtures ==
Win Loss

=== 2025 ===
30 November 2025 EuroBasket 2029 pre-qualifiers – 1st round	Armenia	62–74	Norway	Yerevan, Armenia
19:00 (UTC+4)	Scoring by quarter: 18–17, 13–18, 20–14, 11–25
	Pts: Spight 30; Rebs: Melikyan 18; Asts: three players 2	Boxscore	Pts: Frey 21; Rebs: Frey, Rotegård 6 Asts: Frey 8	Arena: Mika Sports Arena; Attendance: 850; Referees: Peter Ženiš (SVK), Alin Faur (ROU), Jan Baloun (CZE)

=== 2026 ===
27 February 2026 EuroBasket 2029 pre-qualifiers – 1st round	Norway	76–67	Bulgaria	Hønefoss, Norway
20:00 (UTC+1)	Scoring by quarter: 29–16, 17–17, 16–14, 14–20
	Pts: Ndow 27; Rebs: Ndow 8 Asts: Espe, Frey 7	Boxscore	Pts: Dimitrov 12; Rebs: Minchev 13; Asts: P. Ivanov, Stoimenov 3	Arena: Hønefoss Arena; Attendance: 1,500; Referees: Łukasz Jankowski (POL), Armin Mutapčić (GER), Jānis Rozenbergs (LAT)

2 July 2026 EuroBasket 2029 pre-qualifiers – 1st round	Norway	116–103	Armenia	Hønefoss, Norway
19:00 (UTC+2)	Scoring by quarter: 32–20, 31–27, 30–29, 23–27
	Pts: Frey 35; Rebs: Ndow 6 Asts: Frey 7	Boxscore	Pts: Jessup, Spight 25; Rebs: Melikyan 8 Asts: Kirakosyan 7	Arena: Hønefoss Arena; Attendance: 1,000; Referees: Viktor Nagy (HUN), Emmanouil Tsolakos (GRE), Joona Haaja (FIN)

5 July 2026 EuroBasket 2029 pre-qualifiers – 1st round	Bulgaria	88–57	Norway	Botevgrad, Bulgaria
19:30 (UTC+3)	Scoring by quarter: 27–10, 25–17, 22–12, 14–18
	Pts: Vezenkov 22; Rebs: A. Ivanov 8 Asts: Toshkov 8	Boxscore	Pts: Bergseng 10; Rebs: Savić 8 Asts: Espe 4	Arena: Arena Botevgrad; Attendance: 3,500; Referees: Zoran Mitrovski (MKD), Jan Baloun (CZE), Oleksandr Oparin (UKR)

30 August 2026 EuroBasket 2029 pre-qualifiers – 2nd round	Czech Republic	108–97(OT)	Norway	Prague, Czech Republic
17:30 (UTC+2)	Scoring by quarter: 25–23, 32–17, 9–22, 24–28, Overtime: 18–7
	Pts: Peterka 22; Rebs: Svoboda 8 Asts: Sehnal 13	Boxscore	Pts: Frey 31; Rebs: Ndow 8 Asts: Espe, Frey 6	Arena: Královka Arena; Attendance: 1,652; Referees: Blaž Zupančič (SVN), Tomasz Łangowski (POL), Branimir Galić (CRO)

26 November 2026 EuroBasket 2029 pre-qualifiers – 2nd round	Norway	vs.	Belgium	Kongsberg, Norway
19:30 (UTC+1)
		Boxscore		Arena: Kongsberghallen

=== 2027 ===
25 February 2027 EuroBasket 2029 pre-qualifiers – 2nd round	Norway	vs.	Czech Republic	Norway
--:-- (UTC+1)
		Boxscore

28 February 2027 EuroBasket 2029 pre-qualifiers – 2nd round	Belgium	vs.	Norway	Belgium
--:-- (UTC+1)
		Boxscore

== Team ==
=== Current roster ===
Roster for the EuroBasket 2029 Pre-Qualifiers match on 30 August 2026 against Czech Republic.

Norway men's national basketball team roster
Players
Coaches

Pos.	No.	Name	Age – Date of birth	Height	Club	Ctr.
G/F	0	Jørgen Odfjell	26 – 3 August 2000	1.97 m (6 ft 6 in)	Gimle	(Norway)
PG	3	Lars Espe	27 – 26 September 1998	1.85 m (6 ft 1 in)	Fyllingen	(Norway)
F	5	Chris-Ebou Ndow	32 – 10 December 1993	2.01 m (6 ft 7 in)	Free agent
PG	7	Harald Frey	29 – 27 May 1997	1.88 m (6 ft 2 in)	Bilbao	(Spain)
SG	12	Mikkel Kolstad	31 – 3 May 1995	1.94 m (6 ft 4 in)	Gimle	(Norway)
PG	18	Mats Bergsjordet	21 – 3 September 2004	1.88 m (6 ft 2 in)	Nidaros Jets	(Norway)
SG	19	Ionas Garras	23 – 9 October 2002	1.95 m (6 ft 5 in)	Kongsberg Miners	(Norway)
C	27	Vuk Vucetic	22 – 28 May 2004	2.06 m (6 ft 9 in)	Ammerud	(Norway)
G	29	Karl Sigurd Madsen	22 – 16 July 2004	1.92 m (6 ft 4 in)	Kongsberg Miners	(Norway)
C	31	Milovan Savic	38 – 23 October 1987	2.05 m (6 ft 9 in)	Gimle	(Norway)
F	32	Kristian Sjølund	26 – 10 September 1999	2.03 m (6 ft 8 in)	Tübingen	(Germany)
SF	41	Henrik Davidsen	32 – 2 September 1993	2.01 m (6 ft 7 in)	Ammerud	(Norway)

Head coach

- (Denmark) Susie Heede-Andersen

Assistant coach(es)

- (United States) Juan Ferrales
- (Norway) Marcel da Cruz
- (United States) Marco Sanders

Legend

- (C) Team captain
- Club – describes last
  club before the competition
- Age – describes age
  on 30 August 2026

=== Depth chart ===
Pos.	Starting 5	Bench 1	Bench 2
C	Ludvik Bergseng	Aksel Borg	William Kruse
PF	Milovan Savic	Henrik Davidsen
SF	Chris-Ebou Ndow	Jorgen Odefjell	Sivert Nordheim
SG	Tobias Rotegård	Mikkel Kolstad	Reidar Greve
PG	Harald Frey	Stian Mjøs	Lars Espe

=== Head coach position ===
- (Norway) Matthias Eckhoff – (2018–2026)
- (Denmark) Susie Heede-Andersen – (2026–present)

=== Notable players ===
- Torgeir Bryn – the first Scandinavian, and the only Norwegian who has played in the NBA; and the most capped player for the Norway national basketball team with 111 matches.

=== Past rosters ===
2018 FIBA European Championship for Small Countries: finished (silver) among 7 teams

Norway men's national basketball team roster
Players
Coaches

Pos.	No.	Name	Age – Date of birth	Height	Club	Ctr.
PG	4	Magnus Midtvedt	28 – 7 April 1990	1.82 m (6 ft 0 in)	Centrum	(Norway)
PG	5	Harald Frey	21 – 27 May 1997	1.85 m (6 ft 1 in)	Montana State	(United States)
G	6	Stian Berg	27 – 4 April 1991	1.87 m (6 ft 2 in)	Asker	(Norway)
PG	7	Lars Espe	19 – 26 September 1998	1.85 m (6 ft 1 in)	Barry Buccaneers	(United States)
G/F	8	Bouna Ndiaye	25 – 20 October 1992	1.98 m (6 ft 6 in)	GET Vosges	(France)
G	9	Nikolas Skouen	28 – 29 January 1990	1.91 m (6 ft 3 in)	Frøya	(Norway)
F	10	Karamo Jawara	27 – 25 June 1991	2.03 m (6 ft 8 in)	Palma	(Spain)
G	11	Stian Mjøs	29 – 27 February 1989	1.85 m (6 ft 1 in)	Bærum	(Norway)
G/F	12	Eivind Lamo	21 – 23 October 1996	1.95 m (6 ft 5 in)	Gimle	(Norway)
G/F	13	Alex Dakin	25 – 2 January 1993	1.97 m (6 ft 6 in)	Bærum	(Norway)
F	14	Sjur Berg	22 – 10 January 1996	2.01 m (6 ft 7 in)	Alaska Anchorage	(United States)
F/C	15	Johannes Dolven	22 – 11 May 1996	2.06 m (6 ft 9 in)	Barry Buccaneers	(United States)

Head coach

- (Norway) Matthias Eckhoff

Assistant coach(es)

- (Norway) Audun Eskeland

Legend

- (C) Team captain
- Club – describes last
  club before the competition
- Age – describes age
  on 26 June 2018

== See also ==
- Norway women's national basketball team
- Norway men's national under-20 basketball team
- Norway men's national under-18 basketball team
- Norway men's national under-16 basketball team
