= 2018–19 BLNO season =

BLNO
- Duration: 22 September 2018 – 2019
- Teams: 10

Finals
- Champions: Kongsberg Miners (2nd title)
- Runners-up: Gimle

The 2018–19 BLNO is the 19th season of the Basketball League of Norway since its establishment. It started on 22 September 2018.

Kongsberg Miners are the defending champions.

== Format ==
The ten participating teams first played the regular season, that consisted in a round-robin schedule containing three rounds with every team playing each opponent at least once home and once away for a total of 27 matches.

At the end of the regular season, the top eight teams qualified for the playoffs.

== Teams ==
Locations of the teams in 2018–19 BLNO

Team	City	Arena
Ammerud	Oslo	Apallokka
Asker Aliens	Asker	Vollenhallen
Bærum	Bærum	Rykkinnhallen
Centrum Tigers	Oslo	Vulkanhallen
Frøya	Bergen	Frøya Idrettspark
Fyllingen	Bergen	Framohallen
Gimle	Bergen	Gimlehallen
Kongsberg Miners	Kongsberg	Kongsberghallen
Nidaros Jets	Trondheim	Husebyhallen
Tromsø Storm	Tromsø	Tromsøhallen

== Regular season ==
=== Standings ===
Pos	Team	Pld	W	L	PF	PA	PD	Pts	Qualification
1	Kongsberg Miners	27	24	3	2559	2112	+447	48	Qualification to playoffs
2	Gimle	27	22	5	2451	1986	+465	44	Qualification to playoffs
3	Bærum	27	21	6	2377	2066	+311	42	Qualification to playoffs
4	Frøya	27	17	10	2375	2211	+164	34	Qualification to playoffs
5	Fyllingen	27	13	14	2420	2447	−27	26	Qualification to playoffs
6	Tromsø Storm	27	12	15	2275	2421	−146	24	Qualification to playoffs
7	Ammerud	27	9	18	2064	2419	−355	18	Qualification to playoffs
8	Centrum Tigers	27	8	19	2143	2381	−238	16	Qualification to playoffs
9	Nidaros Jets	27	6	21	2208	2471	−263	12	
10	Asker Aliens	27	3	24	2061	2419	−358	6	

Source: BLNO

=== Results ===
Home \ Away	AMM	ASK	BAE	CEN	FRO	FYL	GIM	KON	NID	TRO	AMM	ASK	BAE	CEN	FRO	FYL	GIM	KON	NID	TRO
Ammerud	—	76–70	84–92	71–68	60–90	98–95	82–90	70–105	78–82	84–96	—	83–78	—	79–91	—	—	—	75–107	77–70	—
Asker Aliens	82–87	—	63–87	74–80	63–81	68–82	55–91	85–105	97–91	71–83	—	—	67–87	—	91–102	103–92	86–94	58–73	—	—
Bærum	97–46	92–85	—	82–69	79–72	80–81	87–82	92–66	68–54	107–92	104–80	—	—	92–75	92–63	—	—	—	114–89	103–81
Centrum Tigers	91–101	90–62	81–98	—	81–89	89–78	77–93	62–98	82–94	82–84	—	95–85	—	—	—	78–102	65–100	82–97	—	—
Frøya	99–78	99–76	67–73	97–58	—	83–79	69–73	80–97	93–75	101–95	101–76	—	—	93–83	—	—	—	—	108–69	96–87
Fyllingen	77–58	96–87	80–77	93–61	123–93	—	69–85	80–90	99–88	102–87	89–101	—	83–104	—	73–90	—	70–100	—	—	89–101
Gimle	84–44	98–75	96–72	91–69	86–97	97–81	—	93–81	90–57	98–64	107–84	—	79–89	—	99–78	—	—	—	115–73	74–94
Kongsberg Miners	104–52	100–57	85–76	82–71	98–94	128–98	63–67	—	110–90	95–75	—	—	90–67	—	90–83	118–100	81–80	—	—	105–81
Nidaros Jets	101–98	77–83	56–76	89–94	96–88	83–97	70–89	90–94	—	76–85	—	111–89	—	80–81	—	88–95	—	80–100	—	—
Tromsø Storm	76–86	69–63	100–90	98–92	63–69	111–117	58–100	74–95	94–90	—	73–56	98–90	—	79–101	—	—	—	—	77–89	—

Source: BLNO
Legend: Blue = home team win; Red = away team win.

== Playoffs ==
Playoffs were played in a best-of-three games format.

=== Bracket ===
Quarter-finals
Kongsberg Miners	2
Centrum Tigers	0
Frøya	2
Fyllingen	1
Gimle	2
Ammerud	0
Bærum	2
Tromsø Storm	1

Semi-finals
Kongsberg Miners	2
Frøya	0
Gimle	2
Bærum	0

Final
Kongsberg Miners	2
Gimle	1

=== Quarter-finals ===
Team 1	Series	Team 2	Game 1	Game 2	Game 3
Kongsberg Miners	2–0	Centrum Tigers	103–79	80–93	
Gimle	2–0	Ammerud	117–63	85–65	
Bærum	2–1	Tromsø Storm	85–76	70–82	85–74
Frøya	2–1	Fyllingen	94–78	89–97	106–104

=== Semi-finals ===
Team 1	Series	Team 2	Game 1	Game 2	Game 3
Kongsberg Miners	2–0	Frøya	94–86	98–94	
Gimle	2–0	Bærum	78–64	88–75	

=== Finals ===
Team 1	Series	Team 2	Game 1	Game 2	Game 3
Kongsberg Miners	2–1	Gimle	83–86	76–81	72–68

== Norwegian clubs in European competitions ==
Norwegian clubs came back to European competitions sixteen years after their last participation.

Team	Competition	Progress
Kongsberg Miners	FIBA Europe Cup	First qualifying round
