= 2017–18 BLNO season =

BLNO
- Duration: 22 September 2017 – 11 April 2018
- Games played: 152
- Teams: 10

Regular season
- Top seed: Asker Aliens
- Season MVP: Aksel Bolin
- Relegated: Centrum Tigers

Finals
- Champions: Kongsberg Miners (1st title)
- Runners-up: Asker Aliens
- Semi-finalists: Fyllingen; Bærum

Statistical leaders
Points	Nikolas Skouen	26.3
Rebounds	Brian Voelkel	15.6
Assists	Brian Voelkel	9.0

The 2017–18 BLNO was the 18th season of the Basketball League of Norway since its establishment. It started on 22 September 2017 and ended on 11 April 2018 with the third and last game of the finals.

Kongsberg Miners, in their third season in the league, won the title defended by Centrum Tigers, that ended in the last position.

== Format ==
The ten participating teams first played the regular season, that consisted in a round-robin schedule containing three rounds with every team playing each opponent at least once home and once away for a total of 27 matches.

At the end of the regular season, the top eight teams qualified for the playoffs. Quarterfinals and semifinals were played with a best-of-three format and the final is played as a single game.

The last qualified team would be relegated.

== Team changes ==
Persbråten were relegated at the end of the last season, replaced by Fyllingen.

== Teams ==
Locations of the teams in 2017–18 BLNO

Team	City	Arena
Ammerud	Oslo	Apallokka
Asker Aliens	Asker	Vollenhallen
Bærum	Bærum	Rykkinnhallen
Centrum Tigers	Oslo	Vulkanhallen
Frøya	Bergen	Frøya Idrettspark
Fyllingen	Bergen	Framohallen
Gimle	Bergen	Gimlehallen
Kongsberg Miners	Kongsberg	Kongsberghallen
Nidaros Jets	Trondheim	Husebyhallen
Tromsø Storm	Tromsø	Tromsøhallen

== Regular season ==
Pos	Team	Pld	W	L	PF	PA	PD	Pts	Qualification or relegation
1	Asker Aliens	27	24	3	2445	1994	+451	51	Qualification to playoffs
2	Kongsberg Miners	27	23	4	2574	2095	+479	50	Qualification to playoffs
3	Fyllingen	27	16	11	2532	2404	+128	43	Qualification to playoffs
4	Gimle	27	14	13	2141	2102	+39	41	Qualification to playoffs
5	Bærum	27	14	13	2238	2118	+120	41	Qualification to playoffs
6	Frøya	27	14	13	2433	2274	+159	41	Qualification to playoffs
7	Tromsø Storm	27	12	15	1997	2205	−208	39	Qualification to playoffs
8	Ammerud	27	9	18	1877	2248	−371	36	Qualification to playoffs
9	Nidaros Jets	27	8	19	2100	2318	−218	35	
10	Centrum Tigers	27	1	26	1886	2465	−579	28	

Source: BLNO

== Playoffs ==
Quarter-finals
Asker Aliens	92	97
Ammerud	58	66
Gimle	66	76
Bærum	87	92
Kongsberg Miners	93	95
Tromsø Storm	61	85
Fyllingen	114	72	110
Frøya	92	91	104

Semi-finals
Asker Aliens	86	73	80
Bærum	75	89	75
Kongsberg Miners	84	110
Fyllingen	78	94

Final
Asker Aliens	70	79	68
Kongsberg Miners	93	68	83

== Awards ==
The individual awards and the All-League team were chosen by the coaches of the League.

=== Individual awards ===
Award	Player	Club
Regular Season MVP	Aksel Bolin	Asker Aliens
Defensive Player of the Year	Fred Thomas	Kongsberg Miners
Young Player of the Year	Mikal Gjerde	Kongsberg Miners
Coach of the Year	Mathias Eckhoff	Bærum
BLNO Finals MVP	Brian Voelkel	Kongsberg Miners

=== All-BLNO team ===
PG	Stian Mjøs	Bærum
SG	Nikolas Skouen	Frøya
SF	Brian Voelkel	Kongsberg Miners
PF	Aksel Bolin	Asker Aliens
C	Evan Harris	Nidaros Jets
