= 2024–25 Women's BLNO =

Women's basketball league in Norway

Women's BLNO
- Season: 2024–25
- Dates: Regular season: 11 October 2024 – 16 March 2025; Play Offs: 21 March – 1 April 2025
- Teams: 8

Regular season
- Season MVP: (United States) Natalie Villaflor

Finals
- Champions: Ulriken Eagles (6th title)
- Runners-up: Asker Aliens
- Finals MVP: (Norway) Stine Austgulen

Statistical leaders
Points	(United States) Natalie Villaflor	22.6
Rebounds	(Norway) Tori Halvorsen	10.6
Assists	(United States) Reagan Bradley	5.6
Steals	(United States) Reagan Bradley	3.1
Blocks	four players	1.3

The 2024–25 Women's BLNO is the 18th season of the top division women's basketball league in Norway since its establishment in 2007. It starts in October 2024 with the first round of the regular season and ends in May 2025.

Ulriken Eagles are the defending champions.

Ulriken Eagles won their sixth title after beating Asker Aliens in the final.

== Format ==
Each team played every opponent four times and every team would progress to the play offs and would be joined by Sandvika and NTNUI Skakers to round up the play offs. The quarterfinals and semifinals were one off games while the final was a best of three series.

== Regular season ==
Pos	Team	Pld	W	L	PF	PA	PD	Pts	Qualification
1	Ulriken Eagles	20	18	2	1615	1083	+532	38	Play Offs
2	Asker Aliens	20	15	5	1415	1250	+165	35	Play Offs
3	Ullern 56ers	20	14	6	1365	1157	+208	34	Play Offs
4	Bærum Basket	20	5	15	1047	1286	−239	25 (Note: Bærum Basket 236–228 Ammerud)	Play Offs
5	Ammerud	20	5	15	1203	1450	−247	25	Play Offs
6	Bergen Elite	20	3	17	1035	1454	−419	23	Play Offs

Source: Women's BLNO
Rules for classification: 1) Points; 2) Points difference; 3) Points scored.

== Play offs ==
Quarterfinals
1	Ulriken Eagles	132
8	NTNUI Skakers	44
4	Bærum Basket	73
5	Ammerud	62
2	Asker Aliens	81
7	Sandvika	52
3	Ullern 56ers	66
6	Bergen Elite	49

Semifinals
1	Ulriken Eagles	72
4	Bærum Basket	37
2	Asker Aliens	59
3	Ullern 56ers	47

Final
1	Ulriken Eagles	72	67	139
2	Asker Aliens	47	59	106
Third place
3	Ullern 56ers	75	75
4	Bærum Basket	44	44

=== 5–8 classification bracket ===
Semifinals
5	Ammerud	47
8	NTNUI Skakers	75
6	Bergen Elite	56
7	Sandvika	53

Fifth place
8	NTNUI Skakers	44
6	Bergen Elite	63
Seventh place
5	Ammerud	47
7	Sandvika	70

Champions of Norway

Ulriken Eagles
Sixth title
