= 2016–17 BLNO season =

BLNO
- Teams: 10

Finals
- Champions: Centrum Tigers
- Runners-up: Gimle

The 2016–17 BLNO is the 17th season of the Basketball League of Norway since its establishment.

Centrum Tigers won its second league after beating Gimle in the single-game final.

== Format ==
The ten participating teams first played the regular season, that consisted in a round-robin schedule containing three rounds with every team playing each opponent at least once home and once away for a total of 27 matches.

At the end of the regular season, the top eight teams qualified for the playoffs. Quarterfinals and semifinals were played with a best-of-three format and the final is played as a single game.

== Regular season ==
| Pos | Team | Pld | W | L | PF | PA | PD | Pts | Qualification or relegation |
|---|---|---|---|---|---|---|---|---|---|
| 1 | Kongsberg Miners | 27 | 23 | 4 | 2413 | 1982 | +431 | 50 | Qualification to playoffs |
| 2 | Bærum | 27 | 21 | 6 | 2481 | 2147 | +334 | 48 | Qualification to playoffs |
| 3 | Gimle | 27 | 17 | 10 | 2309 | 2130 | +179 | 44 | Qualification to playoffs |
| 4 | Frøya | 27 | 17 | 10 | 2157 | 2020 | +137 | 44 | Qualification to playoffs |
| 5 | Centrum Tigers | 27 | 16 | 11 | 2282 | 2058 | +224 | 43 | Qualification to playoffs |
| 6 | Asker Aliens | 27 | 13 | 14 | 2126 | 2212 | −86 | 40 | Qualification to playoffs |
| 7 | Nidaros Jets | 27 | 12 | 15 | 2063 | 2168 | −105 | 39 | Qualification to playoffs |
| 8 | Tromsø Storm | 27 | 9 | 18 | 1829 | 2028 | −199 | 36 | Qualification to playoffs |
| 9 | Ammerud | 27 | 5 | 22 | 1858 | 2303 | −445 | 32 | |
| 10 | Persbråten | 27 | 2 | 25 | 1855 | 2325 | −470 | 29 | Relegated |

Source: BLNO

== Playoffs ==
Teams better qualified in the regular season played games 2 and 3, if necessary, at home. Only in the semifinal between Kongsberg Miners and Centrum Tigers, the format of 1–1–1 was used.

Quarter-finals
Kongsberg Miners | 76 | 74
Tromsø Storm | 61 | 57
Frøya | 68 | 73
Centrum Tigers | 94 | 75
Bærum | 96 | 102
Nidaros Jets | 82 | 94
Gimle | 93 | 90
Asker Aliens | 69 | 61

Semi-finals
Kongsberg Miners | 60 | 84
Centrum Tigers | 86 | 86
Bærum | 91 | 87
Gimle | 101 | 91

Final
Centrum Tigers | 87
Gimle | 74
