= 2021 FIBA European Championship for Small Countries =

Tournament details
- Host country: Ireland
- City: Dublin
- Dates: 10–15 August 2021
- Teams: 5
- Venue(s): 1 (in 1 host city)

Final positions
- Champions: Ireland (2nd title)
- Runners-up: Andorra
- Third place: Malta

Tournament statistics
- MVP: (Andorra) Guillem Colom

Official website
- www.fiba.basketball

The 2021 FIBA European Championship for Small Countries was the 17th edition of this tournament, hosted in Dublin, Ireland. Initially, the championship was postponed due to the COVID-19 pandemic. It was rescheduled to 10‍–‍15 August 2021.

Ireland won the title for the second time.

== Teams ==
Moldova and Norway did not join this edition. They were replaced by Armenia, who were winners in 2016 about to come back to competition after their withdrawal from the EuroBasket 2021 pre-qualifiers, and Azerbaijan, winners in 2006 and 2008 - Azerbaijan was set for a comeback to competition since its participation in the EuroBasket 2013 qualification.

Due to the postponement of the tournament to 2021, Armenia and Azerbaijan withdrew from participating in the tournament.

Team	App	Last	Best placement in tournament	Rank
Andorra	14th	2018	Champion (1998, 2000, 2004, 2012, 2014)	77
~~Armenia~~	~~2nd~~	~~2016~~	~~Champion (2016)~~	~~80~~
~~Azerbaijan~~	~~4th~~	~~2008~~	~~Champion (2006, 2008)~~	~~103~~
Gibraltar	17th	2018	Fourth place (1998, 2018)	147
Ireland	7th	2018	Champion (1994)	101
Malta	17th	2018	Champion (2018)	81
San Marino	16th	2018	Champion (2002)	114

== Results ==
Pos	Team	Pld	W	L	PF	PA	PD	Pts	Qualification
1	Ireland (H)	4	4	0	413	269	+144	8	Champion
2	Andorra	4	3	1	356	300	+56	7	Silver medal
3	Malta	4	2	2	325	318	+7	6	Bronze medal
4	San Marino	4	1	3	272	376	−104	5	
5	Gibraltar	4	0	4	282	385	−103	4	

Source: FIBA
(H) Hosts

All times are local (UTC+1).

10 August 2021
16:00

Boxscore

Malta	96–65	San Marino
Scoring by quarter: 31–14, 21–28, 33–16, 11–7
Pts: A. Falzon 32; Rebs: T. Falzon 10; Asts: Bugeja, Pace 3		Pts: Macina 17; Rebs: Felici 7 Asts: Macina 5

National Basketball Arena, Dublin
Referees: Maciej Nazimek (IRL), Antonio Zamora (AND), Davíð Tómas Tómasson (ISL)

10 August 2021
19:00

Boxscore

Andorra	81–96	Ireland
Scoring by quarter: 23–29, 22–28, 15–21, 21–18
Pts: Colom 25; Rebs: Colom, Guzmán 8 Asts: Colom 6		Pts: Carroll 24; Rebs: Blount 12; Asts: Blount 5

National Basketball Arena, Dublin
Referees: Paul Unsworth (GBR), James Kerry Dominique (GIB), Edon Morina (DEN)

11 August 2021
16:00

Boxscore

Gibraltar	63–89	Malta
Scoring by quarter: 17–29, 17–14, 15–24, 14–22
Pts: Ortega 16; Rebs: Pérez 9 Asts: Pérez 4		Pts: A. Falzon 38; Rebs: Cassar 20; Asts: Zammit 5

National Basketball Arena, Dublin
Referees: Antonio Zamora (AND), Edon Morina (DEN), Paul Unsworth (GBR)

11 August 2021
19:00

Boxscore

San Marino	56–91	Andorra
Scoring by quarter: 12–31, 20–22, 16–14, 8–24
Pts: Felici 17; Rebs: Felici 10; Asts: three players 2		Pts: Bartolomé, Colom 20; Rebs: Bartolomé 9 Asts: Obiols 5

National Basketball Arena, Dublin
Referees: Maciej Nazimek (IRL), James Kerry Dominique (GIB), Tijmen Last (NED)

12 August 2021
16:00

Boxscore

Andorra	91–74	Gibraltar
Scoring by quarter: 24–14, 15–27, 19–18, 33–15
Pts: Colom 27; Rebs: A. Bartolomé 12; Asts: three players 4		Pts: Ortega 22; Rebs: García 7 Asts: Ortega 3

National Basketball Arena, Dublin
Referees: Davíð Tómas Tómasson (ISL), Maciej Nazimek (IRL), Paul Unsworth (GBR)

12 August 2021
19:00

Boxscore

Ireland	107–59	San Marino
Scoring by quarter: 34–9, 25–13, 21–23, 27–14
Pts: Flood, Hanley 15; Rebs: Blount, Killeen 7 Asts: Fulton, Hosford 4		Pts: Biordi 15; Rebs: Felici 13; Asts: Macina 7

National Basketball Arena, Dublin
Referees: James Kerry Dominique (GIB), Tijmen Last (NED), Antonio Zamora (AND)

14 August 2021
16:00

Boxscore

Malta	74–93	Andorra
Scoring by quarter: 25–19, 13–25, 15–25, 21–24
Pts: Cassar, T. Falzon 23; Rebs: Cassar 11; Asts: Pace 4		Pts: B. Bartolomé 16; Rebs: A. Bartolomé 10; Asts: Fernández 5

National Basketball Arena, Dublin
Referees: Edon Morina (DEN), Maciej Nazimek (IRL), Davíð Tómas Tómasson (ISL)

14 August 2021
19:00

Boxscore

Gibraltar	63–113	Ireland
Scoring by quarter: 14–31, 14–26, 18–26, 17–30
Pts: Buxton, Ortega 15; Rebs: Buxton 8 Asts: Ortega 5		Pts: Flood 19; Rebs: Blount 8 Asts: Blount 6

National Basketball Arena, Dublin
Referees: Tijmen Last (NED), Antonio Zamora (AND), Paul Unsworth (GBR)

15 August 2021
16:00

Boxscore

San Marino	92–82	Gibraltar
Scoring by quarter: 26–25, 16–25, 32–15, 18–17
Pts: Moretti 23; Rebs: Biordi 9 Asts: Macina 9		Pts: Buxton 25; Rebs: García 13; Asts: Ortega 6

National Basketball Arena, Dublin
Referees: Tijmen Last (NED), Maciej Nazimek (IRL), Edon Morina (DEN)

15 August 2021
19:00

Boxscore

Ireland	97–66	Malta
Scoring by quarter: 23–17, 28–15, 22–22, 24–12
Pts: Carroll 20; Rebs: Blount 15; Asts: Blount 9		Pts: T. Falzon 17; Rebs: T. Falzon 11; Asts: T. Falzon 5

National Basketball Arena, Dublin
Referees: James Kerry Dominique (GIB), Paul Unsworth (GBR), Davíð Tómas Tómasson (ISL)
