= Torgeir Bryn =

Norwegian basketball player (born 1964)

Personal information
- Born: 19 August 1964 (age 62) Oslo, Norway
- Listed height: 6 ft 9 in (2.06 m)
- Listed weight: 250 lb (113 kg)

Career information
- High school: Oslo Technical Maritime (Oslo, Norway)
- College: MiraCosta CC (1983–1984); Texas State (1987–1989)
- NBA draft: 1989: undrafted
- Playing career: 1989–2009
- Position: Power forward / center
- Number: 12

Career history
- 1989: Los Angeles Clippers
- 1989–1990: Tulsa Fast Breakers
- 1990: San Jose Jammers
- 1990: Quad City Thunder
- 1990–1991: UA Cognac
- 1991: CB Breogán
- 1991–1993: Fort Wayne Fury
- 1993: Omaha Racers
- 1993–1994: ALM Évreux Basket
- 1994: CB Estudiantes
- 1995: Benfica
- 1995–1996: Zalgiris Kaunas
- 1996–1997: Pau Orthez
- 1997–1998: Le Mans Sarthe Basket
- 1998–1999: BC Gand
- 1999: Aurora Basket Jesi
- 1999–2000: Aris Thessaloniki
- 2000–2002: Oslo Kings
- 2002–2003: Harstad Vikings
- 2007–2009: Ammerud Basket

Career highlights
- First-team All-Southland (1989)
- Stats at NBA.com
- Stats at Basketball Reference

Torgeir Bryn (Norwegian: [ˈtɔ̂rɡæɪr ˈbryːn]; born 19 August 1964) is a Norwegian former professional basketball player. A 6-foot-9-inch (2.06 m), 250-pound (110 kg) center born in Oslo, Bryn is notable for being the only Norwegian who has played in the National Basketball Association (NBA) thus far.

== Club career ==
=== United States ===
In the U.S., Bryn attended MiraCosta Community College (Oceanside, California) and then Southwest Texas State University (San Marcos, Texas), where he played NCAA college basketball. At MiraCosta College Bryn played for Clete Adelman, older brother of NBA coach Rick Adelman. He enjoyed a very brief NBA career during the 1989–90 season; his stint for the Los Angeles Clippers limited to playing ten minutes over three matches in which he scored four points. He also played for several CBA clubs and a USBL club. In the CBA, Bryn played for the Tulsa Fast Breakers, San Jose Jammers, Quad City Thunder, Fort Wayne Fury and Omaha Racers. He averaged 7.1 points in 71 games between 1989 and 1993.

=== Europe ===
Bryn also played professionally for a number of European clubs, namely SLBenfica in Portugal and Zalgiris, Kaunas in Lithuania.

=== Norway ===
His youth club in Norway was Ammerud Basket. He also had spells for the Oslo Kings (Vålerenga Kings) and Harstad Vikings.

Bryn made a comeback for Ammerud Basket at the age of 43, before the 2007–08 BLNO season. He played together with his son, Martin Bryn.

== NBA career statistics ==
Legend
GP	Games played	GS	Games started	MPG	Minutes per game
FG%	Field goal percentage	3P%	3-point field goal percentage	FT%	Free throw percentage
RPG	Rebounds per game	APG	Assists per game	SPG	Steals per game
BPG	Blocks per game	PPG	Points per game	**Bold**	Career high

=== Regular season ===
Year	Team	GP	GS	MPG	FG%	3P%	FT%	RPG	APG	SPG	BPG	PPG
1989-90	L. A. Clippers	3	0	3.3	.000	.000	.667	0.7	0.0	.7	0.3	1.3

== International career ==
He is the most capped player for the Norway national basketball team, with 111 matches.
