= Austin Steed =

American professional basketball player (born 1988)

Free agent
- Position: Power forward / center

Personal information
- Born: June 20, 1988 (age 38) Hephzibah, Georgia
- Listed height: 6 ft 8 in (2.03 m)
- Listed weight: 236 lb (107 kg)

Career information
- High school: Butler (Augusta, Georgia)
- College: South Carolina (2007–2010); East Carolina (2011–2012)
- NBA draft: 2012: undrafted
- Playing career: 2012–present

Career history
- 2012–2013: Citybasket Recklinghausen
- 2013–2014: Bærum
- 2015–2016: Olimpi Tbilisi
- 2016: Artland Dragons
- 2016–2017: Swans Gmunden

Austin Steed Jr. is an American professional basketball player. He played college basketball at the University of South Carolina up until his junior year, when he transferred to East Carolina University following the 2010 fall semester.

== High school career ==
After playing for the South Carolina Amateur Athletic Union team in Columbia, South Carolina, Steed attended George P. Butler Comprehensive High School, where he averaged 12 points, 5 rebounds, and 2 assists per game in his sophomore season. His exceptional play continued on to his junior year at Butler High School, averaging 12 points, 5 rebounds, and 3 assists per game by the end of the season. After already being named the team MVP as a sophomore, Steed was considered one of the best high school athletes in Georgia. He was named all-conference, all-regional, and eventually all-state, ultimately winning the award for Georgia Athletic Coaches Association (GACA) Player of the Year. This was his reward for averaging a stunning nineteen points, seven rebounds, and five assists during his final season.

Before going to college, Steed represented Fork Union Military Academy, where he played basketball under head coach Fletcher Arritt. There, he finished the season averaging 12.0 points and 7.5 rebounds.

Austin Steed chose to play for the South Carolina Gamecocks over other possibilities such as Georgia and Tennessee Volunteers.

== College career ==
=== South Carolina ===
In his freshman season with the South Carolina Gamecocks, Austin Steed did not find that he fitted in a team that was based, statistically, on Cincinnati Bearcats transfer Devan Downey. As the Gamecocks finished the season with a disappointing 14–18 record, 10th place in the Southeastern Conference, Steed averaged just 2.0 points and 2.0 rebounds, in only six games played.

Although Devan Downey continued to lead the team in scoring for Austin Steed's sophomore season, the Gamecocks finished the regular season with a winning record of 21–10. Steed played his first full regular season of 31 games, averaging 3.9 points and 3.6 rebounds.

By the end of Austin Steed's junior season, four players were averaging double digits, which gave him less opportunities to familiarize his name. Downey, who was in his final season at college was averaging over 20 points, also leading the team in minutes, steals, and assists. Steed, on the other hand, was averaging below 3.0 points even though he had the opportunity to play thirty games. However, against #1 Kentucky, Austin Steed made a game-saving block with only a few minutes left to go in the second half, helping the Gamecocks win the game Even after this, South Carolina finished the season with a 15–16 record.

Soon after the season came to a close, Austin Steed made the decision to transfer from the University of South Carolina to East Carolina University. He earned an undergraduate degree in retail after three and a half years in South Carolina. According to De Pierce, who ran the South Carolina Amateur Athletic Union (AAU) team Steed played for, "Austin loves being a Gamecock and wants a degree from the University of South Carolina." Austin Steed did not play basketball in the 2010–11 season due to ineligibility issues.

=== East Carolina ===
With East Carolina, Steed did not see major changes in play time himself. His team finished the season with a 15–16 record in a less competitive Conference USA. He was the 8th leading scorer by the end of his senior year, finishing with a career-high scoring, rebounding, and assisting average.

== Professional career ==
Austin Steed went undrafted in the 2012 NBA draft, making him an unrestricted free agent. He soon signed with the German basketball club, Citybasket Recklinghausen of the ProB, making his career debut against the BSW Sixers, where he scored 12 points and grabbed 5 rebounds.

After signing with Bærum Basket of the Norwegian BLNO for the 2013–14 season, Steed made his debut against Froya Basket, where he scored 14 points and grabbed 8 rebounds. He scored a career-high 25 points and 17 rebounds against Asker Aliens, a game in which Bærum emerged victorious with a score of 75–67.

On January 12, 2016, Steed signed with Artland Dragons of the German ProB.
