= Anthony Elechi =

American professional basketball player

Anthony Elechi アンソニー・エレチ
Tromsø Storm
- Position: Forward
- League: BLNO

Personal information
- Born: August 10, 1993 (age 33) Elmont, New York
- Listed height: 6 ft 8 in (2.03 m)
- Listed weight: 235 lb (107 kg)

Career information
- High school: Elmont Memorial (Elmont, New York)
- College: Labette Community College (2012–2014); Morehead State (2014–2016)
- NBA draft: 2016: undrafted
- Playing career: 2016–present

Career history
- 2016–2017: Glasgow Rocks
- 2017–2018: Passlab Yamagata Wyverns
- 2018–2019: Surrey Scorchers
- 2019–2020: CP La Roda
- 2020–present: Tromsø Storm

Anthony Elechi (born August 10, 1993) is an American professional basketball player for the Tromsø Storm of the BLNO. His first pro contract was with the Glasgow Rocks in the BBL for the 2016–2017 season. He spent the 2017–2018 season playing for Passlab Yamagata Wyverns in Japan. He played for Surrey Scorchers, returning to the BBL for the 2018–2019 season. Elechi spent the 2019–20 season in the Spanish LEB Plata for CP La Roda, averaging 9.7 points and 5.2 rebounds per game. On July 28, 2020, Elechi signed with the Tromsø Storm.
