= Tobias Rotegård =

Norwegian-American basketball player, born 2000

No. 2 – CB Menorca
- Position: Shooting guard
- League: Primera FEB

Personal information
- Born: 8 May 2000 (age 26) Kongsberg, Norway
- Listed height: 2.01 m (6 ft 7 in)

Career information
- High school: Oak Hill Academy (Mouth of Wilson, Virginia); Sunrise Christian Academy (Bel Aire, Kansas)
- College: UAB (2020–2021); Long Beach State (2021–2023)
- NBA draft: 2024: undrafted
- Playing career: 2016–present

Career history
- 2016–2018: Kongsberg Miners
- 2023–2024: Kongsberg Miners
- 2024: South West Metro Pirates
- 2024–2025: BBC Coburg
- 2025: Kongsberg Miners
- 2025–2026: Kouvot
- 2026–present: Hestia Menorca

Tobias Rotegård (born 8 May 2000) is a Norwegian professional basketball player who plays for Hestia Menorca of the Spanish Primera FEB. He has also played for the Norway men's national basketball team.

== Early life ==
When growing up, Rotegård played in a same youth team with his cousin Kristian Sjolund.

== Professional career ==
After starting his senior career in his native Norway, Rotegård has played in Australia and Germany. In late-September 2025, he moved to Finland after signing with Korisliiga team Kouvot for the 2025–26 season. On April 2, 2026, he signed for Hestia Menorca of the Spanish Primera FEB.

== National team career ==
Rotegård is a former Norwegian youth international at U16 and U18 levels.

He has represented the Norway senior national team at the EuroBasket 2025 pre-qualifiers and 2027 FIBA World Cup pre-qualifiers, reuniting with his cousin Sjolund.
