= Jordan Blount =

Irish basketball player

Neptune
- Position: Forward
- League: Super League

Personal information
- Born: 5 January 1997 (age 29) Cork, Ireland
- Listed height: 6 ft 8 in (2.03 m)
- Listed weight: 220 lb (100 kg)

Career information
- High school: Canarias Basketball Academy (Tenerife, Spain); SPIRE Academy (Geneva, Ohio)
- College: UIC (2017–2020)
- NBA draft: 2020: undrafted
- Playing career: 2020–present

Career history
- 2020: Basket Navarra Club
- 2020: Força Lleida
- 2021: CD Carbajosa
- 2021: Þór Akureyri
- 2021–2022: Sindri
- 2022–2024: Neptune
- 2024-present: KCYMS

Career highlights
- Super League All-Star Second Team (2023)
Medals
Men's basketball
Representing Ireland
FIBA European Championship for Small Countries
Bronze medal – third place	2018 San Marino	Team
Gold medal – first place	2021 Dublin	Team

Jordan Blount (born 5 January 1997) is an Irish professional basketball player for KCYMS of the Irish Super League, and previously for Neptune. He played college basketball for the UIC Flames.

== Early life and career ==
Growing up on the north side of Cork, Blount was obsessed with basketball from an early age, frequently player in older age groups. At the age of 15, he moved to England to join the Plymouth Raiders youth team and won the BCS Cup. Blount received interest from professional teams but ended up joining Canarias Basketball Academy, as he had the desire to play college basketball in the United States. He was recruited by Georgia Tech although they wanted him to attend a preparatory school. After two years playing with Canarias, Blount enrolled at the SPIRE Academy and later committed to UIC.

== College career ==
Blount did not play his freshman year at UIC. As a sophomore, he averaged 6.8 points, 6.8 rebounds, and 2.3 assists per game. On 5 December 2018, Blount scored a career-high 27 points in a 94–75 win against Illinois State. Blount averaged 9.3 points and 5.6 rebounds per game as a junior. He suffered an ACL tear in June 2019 playing under but returned to the court in December 2019. As a senior at UIC, Blount averaged 6.3 points, 4.0 rebounds, and 1.1 assists per game. Though he had an additional year of eligibility, he opted to turn professional.

== Professional career ==
On 14 August 2020, Blount signed with Basket Navarra Club of the LEB Plata. After playing in three games, he parted ways with the team. Blount averaged 11.3 points, 4.7 rebounds and 1.7 steals per game. On 17 November, he signed with Força Lleida of the LEB Oro. Blount averaged 1.8 points and 1.3 rebounds per game in four games. He signed with CD Carbajosa of the LEB Plata on 26 January 2021.

In August 2021, Blount signed with Úrvalsdeild karla club Þór Akureyri. He was released in November due to an injury. In December 2021, he joined Sindri for the rest of the 2021–22 season.

Blount played for Neptune in the 2022–23 Irish Super League season and earned All-Star Second Team honours.

On 6 May 2024, KCYMS Basketball Club announced it has signed Blount for the 2024-25 Irish Super League season.

== National team career ==
Blount played for the Irish under-18 basketball team in the 2015 FIBA Europe Under-18 Championship Division B and averaged 25.4 points, 9.2 rebounds, 3.3 steals and 2.6 assists per game. He played for the Irish under-20 basketball team at the 2016 FIBA U20 European Championship Division B, averaging 12.8 points, 8.5 rebounds, and 2.8 assists per game. Blount represented Ireland at the 2018 FIBA European Championship for Small Countries in San Marino. In four games, he averaged 8.8 points, 5.0 rebounds, 1.8 assists and 1.0 steals per game, helping Ireland win a bronze medal. Blount participated in the 2021 FIBA European Championship for Small Countries and helped Ireland win gold. He averaged 14.0 points, 10.5 rebounds and 5.5 assists per game and was named to the All-Star Five.

== Personal life ==
His father Gary Blount was an Irish basketball referee and coach. He died in October 2020. Blount's siblings Gareth, Colm and Mollie also play basketball.
