= Zoran Majkić =

Serbian basketball player

Personal information
- Born: February 21, 1978 (age 48) Zrenjanin, SR Serbia, SFR Yugoslavia
- Listed height: 2.04 m (6 ft 8 in)

Career information
- Playing career: 1999–2014
- Position: Power forward

Career history
- 1999–2001: Kolubara
- 2001–2002: Polet Novi Bečej
- 2002–2003: Beobanka
- 2003–2004: Atlas
- 2004–2005: Pivovarna Laško
- 2005–2006: Asker Aliens B.C.
- 2006–2007: Egaleo B.C.
- 2007–2008: Rabotnički
- 2008–2010: Louleh a.s Shiraz BC
- 2010–2014: Proleter Zrenjanin

Zoran Majkić (born February 21, 1978) is a former Serbian professional basketball player.
