= 3B/Bærums Verk =

Norwegian basketball club

3B / Bærums Verk IF (3B/BVIF) is a basketball club which was founded in 2002 by BLNO coach Pål Berg. 3B is a combination of EB-85, Bærums Verk IF and Sandvika BBK. The name 3B means "three basketball teams". In 2006 3B, had two teams: a 90/91 team, and a BLNO team.

Bærums Verk Jets folded at the end of the 2005 season, and 3B looked to take over their BLNO franchise, but were denied by the Norges Basketballforbund. The team therefore did not play in the BLNO league until the 2006-2007 season.

== League positions ==
- 2005-2006: 2 (1st division – men). Promotoed to the BLNO after beating Hop og Fjellhamar Stallions in the playoff.
- 2006-2007: 5 (BLNO Grunnspill)
- 2007-2008: 5 (BLNO Grunnserie)
- 2008-2009: 7 (BLNO Grunnserie)
