= Lionel Green =

American basketball player

Personal information
- Born: October 5, 1984 (age 41) New Orleans, Louisiana, U.S.
- Listed height: 196 cm (6 ft 5 in)
- Listed weight: 93 kg (205 lb)

Career information
- High school: Carver (New Orleans, Louisiana)
- College: NE Oklahoma A&M (2006–2008); Southern (New Orleans) (2008–2010)
- NBA draft: 2010: undrafted
- Playing career: 2011–2013
- Position: Forward
- Number: 9

Career history
- 2011–2012: Kaarinan Ura Basket
- 2012: Akita Northern Happinets
- 2012–2013: Baerum Basket

Career highlights
- Norwegian champion (2013)

Lionel Green (born October 5, 1984) is an American former professional basketball player for the Akita Northern Happinets of the Japanese bj league.

== Career statistics ==
Legend
GP	Games played	GS	Games started	MPG	Minutes per game
FG%	Field goal percentage	3P%	3-point field goal percentage	FT%	Free throw percentage
RPG	Rebounds per game	APG	Assists per game	SPG	Steals per game
BPG	Blocks per game	PPG	Points per game	**Bold**	Career high

=== Regular season ===
Year	Team	GP	GS	MPG	FG%	3P%	FT%	RPG	APG	SPG	BPG	PPG
2011–12	Ura	16		33.9	.440	.338	.458	10.2	1.9	1.8	0.1	19.4
2011–12	Akita	23	8	13.3	.398	.273	.259	3.4	1.2	0.6	0.1	5.0
2012–13	Baerum Basket	9	9	29.4	.448	.273	.579	8.89	2.33	1.78	0.78	16.22

=== Playoffs ===
Year	Team	GP	GS	MPG	FG%	3P%	FT%	RPG	APG	SPG	BPG	PPG
2010–11	Akita	4		16.3	.308	.259	.600	3.5	1.0	1.5	0.0	8.5
2012–13	Baerum	2		34.5	.308	.000	.417	9.5	1.5	2.5	0.5	10.5
