= Marin Mornar =

Croatian basketball player

Kongsberg Miners
- Position: Power forward
- League: BLNO

Personal information
- Born: 26 March 1993 (age 33) Zagreb, Croatia
- Listed height: 6 ft 9 in (2.06 m)
- Listed weight: 200 lb (91 kg)

Career information
- College: Loyola Marymount (2012-2016)
- Playing career: 2016–present

Career history
- 2016–2017: Horsens IC
- 2017–2018: Borås Basket
- 2018: Mornar Bar
- 2019: Flyers Wels
- 2019–2020: MZT Skopje
- 2020–present: Kongsberg Miners

Marin Mornar (born 26 March 1993) is a Croatian professional basketball player for Kongsberg Miners of the BLNO. He plays the Power forward position.

== College career ==
As a senior at Loyola Marymount in 2015-16 Mornar averaged 7.6 points, 4.0 rebounds and 0.7 assists in 22.5 minutes in 30 appearances.

== Professional career ==
On August 16, 2019, he signed with Macedonian basketball club MZT Skopje. On October 1, 2020, he signed with the Kongsberg Miners of the Norwegian league.
