= Robert Hubbs III =

American basketball player

No. 23 – Kongsberg Miners
- Position: Shooting guard
- League: BLNO; FIBA Europe Cup

Personal information
- Born: August 19, 1995 (age 31) Union City, Tennessee
- Listed height: 6 ft 5 in (1.96 m)
- Listed weight: 207 lb (94 kg)

Career information
- High school: Dyer County (Newbern, Tennessee)
- College: Tennessee (2013–2017)
- NBA draft: 2017: undrafted
- Playing career: 2017–2020

Career history
- 2017–2018: KK Sutjeska
- 2018–2020: Kongsberg Miners

Career highlights
- Second-team All-SEC (2017)

Robert Lee Hubbs III (born August 19, 1995) is an American professional basketball player for the Kongsberg Miners of the FIBA Europe Cup and the Norwegian BLNO.

Hubbs was one of the most highly acclaimed recruits in University of Tennessee basketball history. He had shoulder surgery which ended his freshman season after 12 games. As a sophomore, Hubbs averaged 7.2 points and 2.9 rebounds per game under coach Donnie Tyndall. He increased his averages to 10.6 points, 1.7 rebounds, and 1.3 assists per game as a junior but missed some time with knee surgery. As a senior at Tennessee, Hubbs averaged 13.7 points, 4.6 rebounds, and 1.7 assists per game and was named to the All-SEC Second Team. After the season he signed with KK Sutjeska of the Montenegrin league. In July 2018, he signed with the Kongsberg Miners in Norway.
