= Norwegian Basketball Federation =

Governing body of basketball

- Founded: 1966
- Affiliation: FIBA Europe
- Affiliation date: 1968
- Headquarters: Oslo
- President: Jan Hendrik Parmann

Official website
- basket.no

The Norwegian Basketball Federation (Norwegian: Norges Basketballforbund), also known as NBBF, is the governing body for basketball in Norway. It was formed in 1966, joined FIBA in 1968, and is headquartered in Oslo. It operates both the Norway men's national team and Norway women's national team. They organise national competitions in Norway, for both the men's and women's senior teams, and also the youth national basketball teams.

The top level professional league in Norway is the BLNO.

== See also ==
- Norway men's national basketball team
- Norway men's national under-20 basketball team
- Norway men's national under-18 basketball team
- Norway men's national under-16 basketball team
- Norway women's national basketball team
- Norway women's national under-20 basketball team
- Norway women's national under-18 basketball team
- Norway women's national under-16 basketball team
