= Harald Frey =

Norwegian–American basketball player (born 1997)

- Frey in 2026

No. 5 – Bilbao Basket
- Position: Point guard
- League: Liga ACB

Personal information
- Born: May 27, 1997 (age 29) Oslo, Norway
- Listed height: 6 ft 2 in (1.88 m)
- Listed weight: 185 lb (84 kg)

Career information
- High school: Wang Sports Academy (Oslo, Norway)
- College: Montana State (2016–2020)
- NBA draft: 2020: undrafted
- Playing career: 2012–present

Career history
- 2012–2015: Bærum Basket
- 2015–2016: Centrum Tigers
- 2020–2022: Oviedo CB
- 2022–2023: BG Göttingen
- 2023–2024: Telekom Baskets Bonn
- 2024–present: Bilbao Basket

Career highlights
- 2× FIBA Europe Cup champion (2025, 2026); First-team All-Big Sky (2020); Second-team All-Big Sky (2019); Big Sky Freshman of the Year (2017); BLNO Young Player of the Year (2016)

Harald Eika Frey (born May 27, 1997) is a Norwegian professional basketball player for Bilbao of the Spanish Liga ACB. He played college basketball for the Montana State Bobcats.

== Early life and career ==
Frey grew up in Oslo and began playing basketball at the age of 8. He played basketball and soccer, until deciding to focus on basketball as a teenager. At the age of 15 in 2012, he joined Bærum Basket of the BLNO as an amateur. During the 2014-15 season, Frey averaged 13.3 points and 3.5 assists per game, shooting 51 percent from the field, and 34.6 percent from three-point range. Frey spent the 2015-16 season with Centrum Tigers, averaging 16.9 points, 4.7 rebounds, 4.6 assists and 2.6 steals per game. He also attended Wang Sports Academy in Oslo and was coached by Inge Kristiansen. Montana State assistant coach Chris Haslam recruited him to the Bobcats. In September 2015, Frey committed to Montana State over an offer from NJIT.

== College career ==
Frey averaged 12.7 points and 3.4 assists per game as a freshman. He was named Big Sky freshman of the year. As a sophomore, Frey scored 30 points against Southern Utah but struggled with his shooting during conference play. He averaged 13.1 points, 3.1 rebounds, and 3.2 assists per game. On December 9, 2018, Frey scored a season-high 31 points on 8-of-16 shooting and dished a career-best 10 assists in a win over Washington State. Frey averaged 17.2 points, 5.0 assists and 4.5 rebounds per game as a junior. He was named to the Second Team All-Big Sky.

On November 16, 2019, Frey hit a halfcourt buzzer-beater to defeat UNC Greenboro at the Spartan Invitational 67-66. On February 2, 2020, Frey scored a career-high 37 points and grabbed six rebounds in a 78-64 loss to Montana. He suffered a sprained ankle on February 21, but recorded 18 points, three steals and three assists in a 59-54 loss to Montana the following game. As a senior, Frey averaged 16.6 points, 4.6 assists, 4.3 rebounds and 1.5 steals per game, earning First Team All-Big Sky honors. He finished his college career as Montana State's leader in games played with 127, and second in school history in free throws made (456), assists (514) and 3-pointers made (270). Frey scored 1,890 points, third in Bobcat history, and he became one of two players in Big Sky Conference history to register over 1,800 points and 500 assists.

== Professional career ==
On August 9, 2020, Frey signed his first professional contract with Oviedo CB of the Spanish LEB Oro. He averaged 6.6 points and 2 assists per game in his rookie season. On June 14, 2021, Frey re-signed with the team. He averaged 16.0 points, 3.6 rebounds and 4.6 assists per game.

On January 26, 2022, Frey signed with BG Göttingen of the Basketball Bundesliga. He wrapped-up the 2022-23 season as the team's second leading scorer, averaging 14.0 points per outing. On July 3, 2023, he inked a deal with fellow Bundesliga side Telekom Baskets Bonn. Frey averaged 11.1 points, 1.5 rebounds, 5.0 assists, and 1.2 steals per game. On June 4, 2024, he signed with Bilbao of the Spanish Liga ACB.

== National team career ==
Frey has represented Norway in several international competitions. In 2015, he played on the U18 team in the European Championships, averaging 16.6 points per game. Frey joined the senior national team in the 2018 FIBA European Championship for Small Countries and averaged 14.2 points, 4 rebounds, and 3.6 assists per game. He participated in the 2019 Summer Universiade in Italy. In six games, Frey averaged 14.0 points, 4.5 rebounds, and 5.3 assists per game.

== Personal life ==
Frey is the son of Hege and Ståle Frey. His mother is a teacher and his father is a physiotherapist and former captain of the Norwegian basketball team. Frey's younger sister Anniken is also a basketball player and was MVP of the U16 team. Frey considers Norwegian-born former Montana State and NFL kicker Jan Stenerud a role model, and met him once.
