= Kristian Sjolund =

Norwegian-American basketball player, born 1999

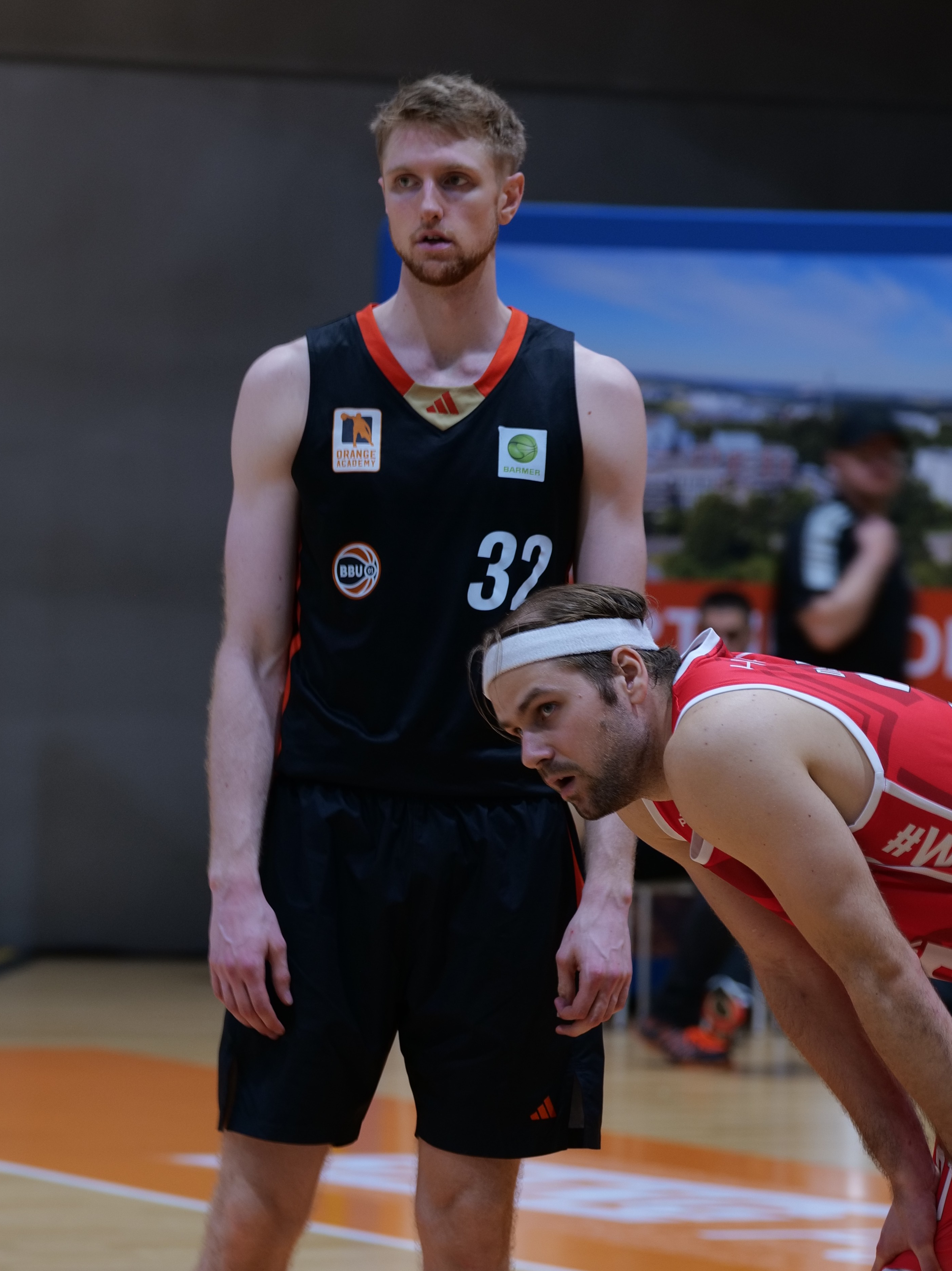
- Sjolund with OrangeAcademy in 2024

No. 12 – Tigers Tübingen
- Position: Forward
- League: ProA

Personal information
- Born: 10 September 1999 (age 27) Vancouver, Washington, U.S.
- Listed height: 2.03 m (6 ft 8 in)
- Listed weight: 95 kg (209 lb)

Career information
- High school: Obra D. Tompkins (Katy, Texas)
- College: Georgia Tech (2018–2019); UTEP (2020–2021); Portland (2021–2023)
- NBA draft: 2023: undrafted
- Playing career: 2015–present

Career history
- 2015–2016: Kongsberg Miners
- 2023–2024: Medi Bayreuth
- 2024: Kauhajoki Karhu
- 2024–2025: OrangeAcademy
- 2025–2026: Kongsberg Miners
- 2026–present: Tigers Tübingen

Kristian Henning Sjolund (Norwegian: Kristian Sjølund; born 10 September 1999) is a Norwegian-American professional basketball player for Tigers Tübingen of the German ProA. He is also a part of the Norway national team.

== Early life ==
Sjolund was born in the United States. His father had played college basketball for Florida Atlantic University between 1993 and 1997. He was raised in Kongsberg, Norway, and started basketball at the age of five in a youth team of Kongsberg Miners. When growing up, he also played in a same team with his cousin Tobias Rotegård.

== Professional career ==
Sjolund started his senior career with Kongsberg Miners in the 2015–16 season, before moving back to U.S. to start high school.

After finishing college, Sjolund played for Medi Bayreuth in German ProA.

In January 2024, he signed with Kauhajoki Karhu Basket in Finnish Korisliiga. They finished 3rd in the league and won the bronze medal.

On August 5, 2026, he signed with Tigers Tübingen of the German ProA.

== National team career ==
Sjolund is a former Norwegian youth international at U16 and U18 levels.

He has represented the Norway senior national team at the EuroBasket 2025 pre-qualifiers and 2027 FIBA World Cup pre-qualifiers.
