= Tevin Falzon =

American basketball player (born 1992)

Pallacanestro Palestrina
- Position: Power forward
- League: Serie B Basket

Personal information
- Born: November 19, 1992 (age 33) Newton, Massachusetts, U.S.
- Listed height: 6 ft 7 in (2.01 m)
- Listed weight: 221 lb (100 kg)

Career information
- High school: Newton North (Newtonville, Massachusetts); The Winchenedon School (Winchendon, Massachusetts)
- College: Sacred Heart (2012–2016)
- Playing career: 2016–present

Career history
- 2017: Zornotza ST
- 2017–2018: Cheshire Phoenix
- 2018–2019: Bristol Flyers
- 2020: Njarðvík
- 2020–present: Pallacanestro Palestrina

Career highlights
- BBL Cup winner (2018)
Medals
Men's basketball
Representing Malta
FIBA Europe U-18 Championship Division C
Gold medal – first place	2009 Valletta	Team
Representing Malta
FIBA European Championship for Small Countries
Gold medal – first place	2018 San Marino	Team
Silver medal – second place	2014 Gibraltar	Team

Tevin Alexander Falzon (born November 19, 1992) is a Maltese-American professional basketball player for Pallacanestro Palestrina of the Italian Serie B Basket. He played college basketball for the Sacred Heart Pioneers. He is also a member of the Maltese national team.

== College career ==
Falzon played for the Sacred Heart Pioneers men's basketball team from 2012 to 2016. During his senior season. he averaged 10.9 points, 8.3 rebounds, 1.5 assists and 1.4 blocks per game. He led the Pioneers in rebounds and blocks in each of his last two seasons.

== Professional career ==
In January 2017, Falzon signed with Zornotza ST of the Spanish LEB Plata. With him, Zornotza reached the playoff finals of the league, before losing out to Valladolid.

After his stint in Spain, he joined Cheshire Phoenix of the British Basketball League (BBL). He appeared in 32 regular season games for the Phoenix, averaging 5.8 points and 3.6 rebounds per game. In January 2018, he played a pivotal role in helping Cheshire to their first BBL Cup title in franchise history, scoring 12 points in the Cup final. He stayed in the BBL the following season, signing with the Bristol Flyers. In 33 regular season games for the Flyers, including 17 starts, Falzon averaged 8.6 points and 6.4 assists per game.

In January 2020, Falzon signed with Úrvalsdeild karla club Njarðvík where he met his former Sacred Heart teammate, Mario Matasovic. In his debut on January 5, Falzon had 4 points and 5 rebounds. He was released by Njarðvík after 4 games where he averaged 5.0 points and 2.3 rebounds. On September 2, 2020, Falzon signed with Pallacanestro Palestrina of the Serie B Basket.

== National team career ==
Falzon represented Malta in the 2014 FIBA European Championship for Small Countries. During the 2018 FIBA European Championship for Small Countries, Falzon averaged 14.8 points and 7.8 rebounds for the Maltese national team, helping them finish first in the tournament.

== Personal life ==
Tevin's younger brother is basketball player Aaron Falzon.
