= 2018 FIBA European Championship for Small Countries =

Tournament details
- Host country: San Marino
- City: Serravalle
- Dates: 26 June – 1 July 2018
- Teams: 7 (from 1 confederation)
- Venue(s): 1 (in 1 host city)

Final positions
- Champions: Malta (1st title)
- Runners-up: Norway
- Third place: Ireland

Tournament statistics
- MVP: (Malta) Samuel Deguara

Official website
- www.fiba.basketball

The 2018 FIBA European Championship for Small Countries was the 16th edition of this tournament. It was hosted by San Marino.

== Teams ==
Seven teams played in the competition, with the return of Norway, 17 years after their last appearance in a FIBA competition.

Armenia, that participates in the EuroBasket 2021 qualification, and Wales, integrated in the team of Great Britain, were the teams from the previous edition that did not participate in this one.

== Venues ==
2018 FIBA European Championship for Small Countries is located in San Marino	Serravalle
2018 FIBA European Championship for Small Countries is located in San Marino	Multieventi Sport Domus
2018 FIBA European Championship for Small Countries is located in San Marino	Capacity: 1,200

== Preliminary round ==
All times are local (UTC+2).

=== Group A ===
Pos	Team	Pld	W	L	PF	PA	PD	Pts	Qualification
1	Norway	3	3	0	277	186	+91	6	Semifinals
2	Gibraltar	3	2	1	236	257	−21	5	Semifinals
3	San Marino (H)	3	1	2	212	216	−4	4	Classification 5–7
4	Moldova	3	0	3	228	294	−66	3	Classification 5–7

Source: FIBA
(H) Hosts

26 June
14:00

Boxscore

Gibraltar	102–96 (OT)	Moldova
Scoring by quarter: 18–29, 21–18, 31–14, 14–23, Overtime: 18–12
Pts: Ortega 33; Rebs: Buxton 14; Asts: Ortega 8		Pts: Solopa 44; Rebs: Nistor 11; Asts: Cojuhari 6

Multieventi Sport Domus, Serravalle
Referees: Mehmet Karabilecen (TUR), Gordon Barbara (MLT), David Caballe (IRL)

26 June
20:00

Boxscore

San Marino	48–88	Norway
Scoring by quarter: 14–17, 9–20, 10–20, 15–31
Pts: Biordi 13; Rebs: Biordi, Botteghi 7 Asts: Raschi 5		Pts: Mjøs 21; Rebs: Frey 6 Asts: Frey 3

Multieventi Sport Domus, Serravalle
Referees: Vincent Delestrée (BEL), Igor Esteve (AND), Thomas Bissuel (FRA)

27 June
17:30

Boxscore

Norway	95–60	Gibraltar
Scoring by quarter: 23–11, 30–15, 15–20, 27–14
Pts: Ndiaye 19; Rebs: Berg 10; Asts: Frey 5		Pts: Ortega 19; Rebs: Pérez 8 Asts: Yome 3

Multieventi Sport Domus, Serravalle
Referees: Thomas Bissuel (FRA), David Caballe (IRL), Igor Esteve (AND)

27 June
20:00

Boxscore

Moldova	54–98	San Marino
Scoring by quarter: 15–26, 9–24, 5–26, 25–22
Pts: Legosin 14; Rebs: Nistor 11; Asts: Cojuhari 2		Pts: Raschi 20; Rebs: Botteghi 13; Asts: Raschi 5

Multieventi Sport Domus, Serravalle
Referees: Mehmet Karabilecen (TUR), Gordon Barbara (MLT), James Dominique (GIB)

28 June
17:30

Boxscore

Moldova	78–94	Norway
Scoring by quarter: 22–16, 22–23, 20–34, 14–21
Pts: Melniciuc 34; Rebs: Nistor 9 Asts: Cojuhari 6		Pts: Mjøs 18; Rebs: Berg 9 Asts: Jawara 4

Multieventi Sport Domus, Serravalle
Referees: Alessandro Martolini (ITA), Gordon Barbara (MLT), David Caballe (IRL)

28 June
20:00

Boxscore

San Marino	66–74	Gibraltar
Scoring by quarter: 18–15, 18–19, 15–16, 15–24
Pts: Ugolini 17; Rebs: four players 6 Asts: three players 4		Pts: Pérez 19; Rebs: Pérez 9 Asts: four players 3

Multieventi Sport Domus, Serravalle
Referees: Thomas Bissuel (FRA), Igor Esteve (AND), Mehmet Karabilecen (TUR)

=== Group B ===
Pos	Team	Pld	W	L	PF	PA	PD	Pts	Qualification
1	Malta	2	2	0	172	129	+43	4	Semifinals
2	Ireland	2	1	1	128	132	−4	3	Semifinals
3	Andorra	2	0	2	120	159	−39	2	Classification 5–7

Source: FIBA

26 June
16:30

Boxscore

Andorra	64–96	Malta
Scoring by quarter: 23–15, 13–28, 12–34, 16–19
Pts: Gabriel 16; Rebs: Gabriel 8 Asts: Lliteras 4		Pts: T. Falzon 22; Rebs: T. Falzon 9 Asts: T. Falzon, Formosa 3

Multieventi Sport Domus, Serravalle
Referees: Alessandro Martolini (ITA), James Dominique (GIB), Gilbert Hoxha (ALB)

27 June
15:00

Boxscore

Malta	76–65	Ireland
Scoring by quarter: 22–19, 15–18, 19–14, 20–14
Pts: A. Falzon 22; Rebs: Deguara 10; Asts: A. Falzon 6		Pts: O'Sullivan 15; Rebs: Badmus 8 Asts: Roe 4

Multieventi Sport Domus, Serravalle
Referees: Alessandro Martolini (ITA), Vincent Delestrée (BEL), Gilbert Hoxha (ALB)

28 June
15:00

Boxscore

Ireland	63–56	Andorra
Scoring by quarter: 19–8, 15–8, 18–18, 11–22
Pts: Badmus 18; Rebs: three players 7 Asts: Black 3		Pts: Colom 22; Rebs: Bartolome 10; Asts: Gabriel 3

Multieventi Sport Domus, Serravalle
Referees: Vincent Delestrée (BEL), James Dominique (GIB), Gilbert Hoxha (ALB)

== Classification group ==
Pos	Team	Pld	W	L	PF	PA	PD	Pts
5	Andorra	2	2	0	166	99	+67	4
6	San Marino	2	1	1	154	123	+31	3
7	Moldova	2	0	2	97	195	−98	2

Source: FIBA

30 June
15:00

Boxscore

Moldova	43–97	Andorra
Scoring by quarter: 15–31, 7–18, 11–33, 10–15
Pts: Nistor 8 Rebs: Legosin 9 Asts: three players 2		Pts: Guzmán 17; Rebs: Guzmán 8 Asts: Lliteras, Schneider 6

Multieventi Sport Domus, Serravalle
Referees: Alessandro Martolini (ITA), Gordon Barbara (MLT), David Caballe (IRL)

1 July
12:00

Boxscore

Andorra	69–56	San Marino
Scoring by quarter: 18–10, 12–14, 16–19, 23–13
Pts: Gabriel 18; Rebs: Gabriel 11; Asts: Colom 7		Pts: Raschi 16; Rebs: Zanotti 8 Asts: three players 3

Multieventi Sport Domus, Serravalle
Referees: Mehmet Karabilecen (TUR), James Dominique (GIB), Gilbert Hoxka (ALB)

== Final round ==
Semifinals
30 June
Norway	83
Ireland	73
30 June
Malta	102
Gibraltar	57

Final
1 July
Norway	59
Malta	75
Third place
1 July
Ireland	86
Gibraltar	66

=== Semifinals ===
30 June
17:30

Boxscore

Norway	83–73	Ireland
Scoring by quarter: 15–20, 33–11, 17–24, 18–18
Pts: Frey 29; Rebs: Berg 16; Asts: Mjøs 7		Pts: Cairns, Murphy 17; Rebs: Black, Murphy 8 Asts: Roe 5

Multieventi Sport Domus, Serravalle
Referees: Thomas Bissuel (FRA), Igor Esteve (AND), James Dominique (GIB)

30 June
20:00

Boxscore

Malta	102–57	Gibraltar
Scoring by quarter: 25–11, 21–17, 27–15, 29–14
Pts: Formosa 18; Rebs: Deguara 20; Asts: Cassar, T. Falzon 6		Pts: Ortega 17; Rebs: Grigaitis, Pérez 6 Asts: Ortega, Sercombe 3

Multieventi Sport Domus, Serravalle
Referees: Mehmet Karabilecen (TUR), Vincent Delestrée (BEL), Gilbert Hoxha (ALB)

=== Third-place game ===
1 July
14:30

Boxscore

Ireland	86–66	Gibraltar
Scoring by quarter: 19–12, 27–13, 20–29, 20–12
Pts: Badmus 19; Rebs: Badmus 10; Asts: Roe 4		Pts: Ortega 18; Rebs: Ortega 7 Asts: Gómez 4

Multieventi Sport Domus, Serravalle
Referees: Vincent Delestrée (BEL), Gordon Barbara (MLT), Thomas Bissuel (FRA)

=== Final ===
1 July
17:00

Boxscore

Norway	59–75	Malta
Scoring by quarter: 8–22, 13–13, 16–21, 22–19
Pts: Dolven 14; Rebs: Berg 10; Asts: three players 5		Pts: Deguara 24; Rebs: Deguara 14; Asts: A. Falzon 4

Multieventi Sport Domus, Serravalle
Attendance: 150
Referees: Alessandro Martolini (ITA), David Caballe (IRL), Igor Esteve Malmierca (AND)

2018 FIBA European Championship
for Small Countries winner

Malta
First title

== Final ranking ==
Pos	Team	Pld	W	L
1st place, gold medalist(s)	Malta (C)	4	4	0
2nd place, silver medalist(s)	Norway	5	4	1
3rd place, bronze medalist(s)	Ireland	4	2	2
4	Gibraltar	5	2	3
5	Andorra	4	2	2
6	San Marino (H)	4	1	3
7	Moldova	4	0	4

Source: FIBA
(C) Champions; (H) Hosts
