= Aaron Falzon =

Basketball player (b. 1996)

No. 35 – Besançon Avenir Comtois
- Position: Power forward
- League: Nationale Masculine 1

Personal information
- Born: May 19, 1996 (age 30)
- Listed height: 6 ft 8 in (2.03 m)
- Listed weight: 225 lb (102 kg)

Career information
- High school: Northfield Mount Hermon (Mount Hermon, Massachusetts)
- College: Northwestern (2015–2019); Quinnipiac (2019–2020)
- Playing career: 2020–present

Career history
- 2020: Étoile Angers Basket
- 2020–2021: Leicester Riders
- 2021–2022: Traiskirchen Lions
- 2022–2023: Mulhouse Basket Agglomération
- 2023: Kagawa Five Arrows
- 2023–2024: Tachikawa Dice
- 2024–present: Besancon Avenir Comtois
Medals
Men's basketball
Representing Malta
Gold medal – first place	2018 San Marino	Team
Bronze medal – third place	2021 Dublin	Team
Silver medal – second place	2022 Malta	Team
Silver medal – second place	2023 Malta	Team

Aaron Michael Falzon (born May 19, 1996) is a Maltese professional basketball player for Besancon Avenir Comtois (BesAC) of the Nationale Masculine 1. He also plays on the Malta national basketball team. He played college basketball for the Northwestern Wildcats and Quinnipiac Bobcats.

== High school career ==
Falzon graduated from Northfield Mount Hermon School in 2015. As a senior, he was named NEPSAC AAA player of the year. He led NMH to a 26–9 record and averaged 17.7 points per game while grabbing 6.1 rebounds per game. He also made 114 3-pointers during his senior year.

=== Recruiting ===
Falzon finished high school as a 4-star recruit and the 75th ranked player in the class of 2015 according to ESPN.

College recruiting
Name	Hometown	School	Height	Weight	Commit date
Aaron Falzon; PF	Newton, MA	Northfield Mount Hermon (MA)	6 ft 8 in (2.03 m)	210 lb (95 kg)	Oct 13, 2014
Aaron Falzon; PF	Recruit ratings: Scout: Rivals: 247Sports: (83)				

== College career ==
=== Northwestern ===
As a freshman (2015–2016) Falzon played in all 32 games and started in 29 contests. He made a total of 63 3-pointers, the second most ever by a Northwestern freshman. In his debut, Falzon scored 20 points, which is a school record by a freshman in his debut. As a sophomore (2016–2017) Falzon played in only 3 games before redshirting and having season ending knee surgery.

As a redshirt sophomore (2017–2018) played in only 28 games due to injury and started in 10 of those games. He shot 37.5% from the 3-point line while averaging 5.5 points a game. Against Minnesota, Falzon scored 8 points without registering a field goal attempt as he shot 8–8 from the free throw line.

During his final year as a Wildcat (2018–19) Falzon was once again limited due to injury. He played in only 17 contests and started only 4 games. He scored a career high 21 points against Indiana after only scoring 6 points in 3 games prior to the game. He finished the season averaging 3.9 points per game.

=== Quinnipiac ===
Falzon committed to Quinnipiac as a graduate transfer in the spring of 2019. He scored 24 points against Monmouth. He averaged 7.8 points and 2.9 rebounds per game in his only season at Quinnipiac.

== Professional career ==
On September 14, 2020, Falzon signed his first professional contract with Etoile Angers Basket of the Nationale Masculine 1. On December 4, 2020, Falzon signed a one-season contract with Leicester Riders of the British Basketball League (BBL). He averaged 4.1 points and 2.5 rebounds per game. On August 9, 2021, Falzon signed with the Traiskirchen Lions of the Austrian Basketball Bundesliga.

On July 31, 2024, Falzon signed with Besancon Avenir Comtois (BesAC) of the Nationale Masculine 1.

== National team career ==
Falzon has represented Malta in several international tournaments. He participated in the 2021 FIBA European Championship for Small Countries and helped Malta win bronze. Falzon had a 38-point game against Gibraltar and averaged 23.0 points, 7.0 rebounds and 2.3 assists per game. He was named to the All-Star Five.

== Career statistics ==
Legend
GP	Games played	GS	Games started	MPG	Minutes per game
FG%	Field goal percentage	3P%	3-point field goal percentage	FT%	Free throw percentage
RPG	Rebounds per game	APG	Assists per game	SPG	Steals per game
BPG	Blocks per game	PPG	Points per game	**Bold**	Career high

=== College ===
Year	Team	GP	GS	MPG	FG%	3P%	FT%	RPG	APG	SPG	BPG	PPG
2015–16	Northwestern	**32**	**29**	**24.5**	.383	.354	.717	**3.4**	.9	.3	.3	**8.4**
2016–17	Northwestern	3	0	6.7	.000	.000	–	.7	**1.0**	.0	.3	.0
2017–18	Northwestern	28	10	16.0	.349	**.375**	**.853**	1.7	.5	.3	.2	5.5
2018–19	Northwestern	17	4	15.5	.313	.317	.833	1.6	.6	.4	.3	3.9
2019–20	Quinnipiac	30	16	24.0	**.394**	.348	.850	2.9	.7	**.6**	**.5**	7.8
Career		110	59	20.3	.370	.349	.792	2.5	.7	.4	.3	6.6

== Personal life ==
Aaron's brother is basketball player Tevin Falzon.
