= Ulriken Elite =

Norwegian basketball team

- Founded: 1970
- Arena: Haukelandshallen
- Capacity: 5,100
- Championships: 4 Norwegian Titles

Ulriken Elite is a Norwegian professional basketball team. It was formed in 1970 by a group of pupils at Ulriken secondary school. Ulriken play their matches in Haukelandshallen in Bergen. The kits are red and white and the coach is Jay Anderson. The team played in the Norwegian top tier BLNO for several years, but withdrew in 2011.

== Honours ==
- Norwegian Championship

Winners (4): 1994, 1999, 2000, 2007
