= Harstad Vikings =

Norwegian basketball team

Harstad Vikings was a Norwegian basketball team. The Vikings played their matches in Harstadhallen. They used to wear blue and white kits. Harstad won the BLNO championship in 2006, and made a total of 5 final appearances.
