= Kongsberg Miners =

- Leagues: BLNO
- Arena: Kongsberghallen
- Location: Kongsberg, Norway
- Team colors: Navy, Orange, White
- Championships: 2 Norwegian leagues
- Website: kongsbergminers.no/blno/

Kongsberg Miners, also known as Bergkameratene Basketball, is a professional basketball team based in Kongsberg, Norway, playing in the Norwegian premier professional men's basketball league BLNO. Kongsberg Miners is currently the most successful basketball team in Norway, winning both the regular season and the Norwegian championship in the 2018/2019 season.

== History ==
The team made their debut in the BLNO in the 2015–16 season. In the 2016–17 season, the team finished the regular season in the first place but failed in the playoffs after being eliminated in the semifinals.

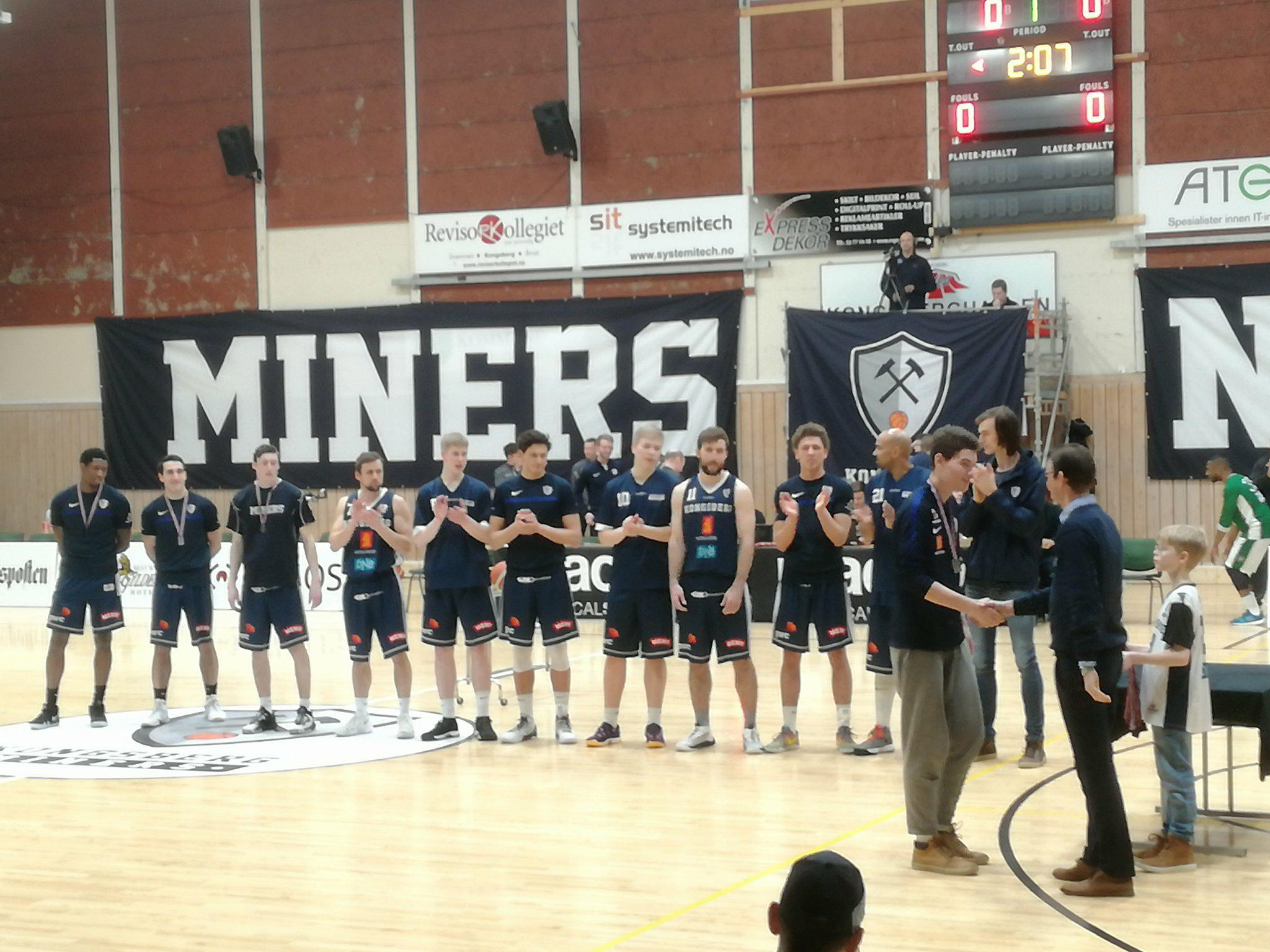
The Miners team in its 2017–18 championship season

In the 2017–18 season, the Miners won the Norwegian championship by beating Asker Aliens in the finals.

In 2018, Miners made their debut in European competitions by playing the FIBA Europe Cup. They were eliminated by Ukrainian Cherkaski Mavpy in the first qualifying round. Kongsberg lost its first European game at home, 63–83, and its second 101–90, away.

In the 2018–19 season, the Miners won both the regular season and the Norwegian championship. They beat Gimle in the championship finals. Robert Hubbs III was the MVP of the championship.

Miners won the series again in the seasons of 2019/2020 and 2022/2023.

== European record ==
Season	Competition	Round	Club	Home	Away	Agg
2018–19	FIBA Europe Cup	QR1	(Ukraine) Cherkaski Mavpy	63–83	101–90	153–184

Notes

1. Kongsberg points are listed first.

== Current roster ==
Note: Flags indicate national team eligibility at FIBA-sanctioned events. Players may hold other non-FIBA nationalities not displayed.

Kongsberg Miners roster
Players
Coaches

Pos.	No.	Nat.	Name
G	1	(Norway)	William Lybæk
G	2	(Norway)	Christoffer Rotegård
G	3	(Norway)	Mats Undebakke
G	4	(Norway)	Harald Hemstad
F	5	(United States)	Jordan Roberts
G	6	(Norway)	Benjamin Fischer
G	7	(Norway)	Eldar Alagic
F	8	(Norway)	Aly Hudgins
F	9	(Sweden)	Åke Swahn
G	10	(Norway)	Niklas Sandström
F	11	(Croatia)	Marin Mornar
G	12	(Norway)	Ionas Berg Garras
G	13	(Norway)	Matteo Smajlovic
F	14	(Norway)	Karl Sigurd Madsen
G	15	(Norway)	Erik Lie Viken
F		(Norway)	Kristian Sjolund

Head coach

(United States) Juan Ferrales

Assistant coach(es)

(Norway) Henrik Aabelvik

Legend

- (C) Team captain
- Injured

- Roster
Updated: 25th of Septembre 2023

== Honours ==
BLNO

- Champions (2): 2017–18, 2018–19
