= Tromsø Storm =

- Leagues: BLNO
- Arena: Tromsøhallen
- Capacity: 2,500
- Team colors: Blue, Light Blue
- Championships: 1 Norwegian Titles
- Website: tromsostorm.no
Home	Away

Tromsø Storm is a Norwegian basketball team from the city of Tromsø, playing in the Norwegian Basketball Premier League, BLNO. The home arena of Tromsø Storm is Tromsøhallen, which has an official capacity of approximately 2,500 spectators, though it has been known to hold more.

== History ==
Tromsø Storm has been playing in the BLNO since the Norwegian league was officially revitalized in the year 2000. Prior to this, the club was playing in the Norwegian top division under the name Tromsø Basketball Klubb (TBBK). TBBK won the play-offs in the Norwegian top division in 1997 and lost the finals in 1998. The club has not been able to copy this achievement under its new name, even though it has come close on several occasions.

Initially Tromsø Storm performed in the low and mid-range of the league table, but since the 2006/07 campaign the team has had only winning seasons. It has also won the regular season series three times. Despite these achievements, the club has not been able to make it through to the play-off finals.

Tromsø Storm has been one of the two clubs in the league with the highest attendances on average, with an all-time high in the final match of the 2006/2007 season when a full packed arena saw the team beat the arch rival Harstad Vikings in the final match of the regular season, bringing the team to the top of the league table and winning the league championship.

== Honours ==
- BLNO

Winners (1): 1996–97
