= Centrum Tigers =

- Leagues: BLNO
- Founded: 1987; 38 years ago
- Arena: Vulkan Flerbrukshall
- Location: Oslo, Norway
- Championships: 2 Norwegian Leagues
- Website: www.centrumtigers.com

Centrum Tigers is a basketball club based in Oslo, Norway. The team currently plays in first tier of Norwegian basketball and won the league back to back in 2016 and 2017.

== Honours ==
- BLNO

Champions (2): 2015–16, 2016–17
