= Basketligaen Norge =

Basketball league in Norway

BLNO
- Organising body: NBBF
- Founded: 1974; 52 years ago
- First season: 1974–75
- Country: Norway
- Confederation: FIBA Europe
- Number of teams: 10
- Level on pyramid: 1
- Relegation to: 1. divisjon
- Domestic cup: Norwegian Cup
- Current champions: Fyllingen Basketballklubb (3rd title) (2025–26)
- Most championships: Asker Aliens (6 titles)
- Website: www.basket.no/blno

Basketligaen Norge, better known as BLNO, is a professional men's basketball league in Norway. It was established in 2000 following the rebranding of the former premier division Hovedserien (1974–2000). The competition is organised by the Norwegian Basketball Federation (NBBF). It is played with a regular season and playoff format.

== History ==
Basketligaen Norge was established in 2000, replacing the former Hovedserien that had run since 1974. The creation of the league aimed to professionalize basketball in Norway and improve its competitive level.

During the 2000s, BLNO grew steadily, expanding its team roster and introducing playoffs to enhance the excitement and audience engagement. Clubs like Asker Aliens emerged as dominant, securing multiple titles and raising the league’s profile.

In the late 2010s, the league faced financial difficulties and fluctuating team participation, but efforts were made to stabilize and revitalize the competition. The COVID-19 pandemic led to cancellation of the 2020–21 season, disrupting league operations.

Recent investments in youth development programs and media partnerships, such as with MyGame streaming, have helped increase the league’s visibility and fan base.

== Format ==
The season consists of a regular season followed by playoffs, which determine the league champion. The lowest-ranked teams are relegated to the 1. divisjon.

== 2024–25 teams ==
Location of teams in 2024–25 Basketligaen Norge

Team	City	Arena
Ammerud	Oslo	Apallokka
Asker Aliens	Asker	Vollenhallen
Bærum	Bærum	Rykkinnhallen
Centrum Tigers	Oslo	Vulkanhallen
Frøya	Bergen	Frøya Idrettspark
Fyllingen	Bergen	Framohallen
Gimle	Bergen	Gimlehallen
Kongsberg Miners	Kongsberg	Kongsberghallen
Nidaros Jets	Trondheim	Trondheim Spektrum
Oppsal Panthers	Oslo	Oppsal Arena
Tromsø Storm	Tromsø	Tromsøhallen

== Former teams ==
Club	First season in top division	Number of seasons in top division	Top division titles	Last title
Bergen Bulldogs	2001–02	1	–	n/a
Bærums Verk Jets	2000–01	5	1	2003–04
Fjellhamar Stallions	2006–07	3	–	n/a
Frøya Ambassadors	2002–03	3	–	n/a
Harstad Vikings	2000–01	10	1	2005–06
Kongsberg Penguins	2000–01	7	–	n/a
Kristiansand Pirates	2000–01	9	–	n/a
Langhus	2011–12	1	–	n/a
Oslo Kings	2000–01	2	1	2000–01
Ulriken Eagles	2000–01	11	2	2008–09
Vålerenga Kings	2002–03	1	–	n/a

== Finals ==
Season	Champion	Result	Runner-up
2000–01	Oslo Kings	3–2	Kongsberg Penguins
2001–02	Asker Aliens	3–0	Kongsberg Penguins
2002–03	Asker Aliens	3–0	Harstad Vikings
2003–04	Bærum Basket	3–2	Harstad Vikings
2004–05	Asker Aliens	3–0	Harstad Vikings
2005–06	Harstad Vikings	3–2	Asker Aliens
2006–07	Ulriken Eagles	3–1	Harstad Vikings
2007–08	Asker Aliens	3–0	Harstad Vikings
2008–09	Ulriken Eagles	3–2	Tromsø Storm
2009–10	Asker Aliens	3–1	Tromsø Storm
2010–11	Bærum	3–2	Tromsø Storm
2011–12	Frøya	80–78	Asker Aliens
2012–13	Bærum	81–65	Tromsø Storm
2013–14	Gimle	102–68	Ammerud
2014–15	Asker Aliens	81–75	Bærum
2015–16	Centrum Tigers	85–71	Tromsø Storm
2016–17	Centrum Tigers	87–74	Gimle
2017–18	Kongsberg Miners	2–1	Asker Aliens
2018–19	Kongsberg Miners	2–1	Gimle
2019–20	Cancelled due to the COVID-19 pandemic		
2020–21	Cancelled due to the COVID-19 pandemic		
2021–22	Gimle	3–1	Bærum
2022–23	Gimle	3–1	Frøya Ambassadors
2023–24	Fyllingen BBK	3–0	Bærum
2024–25	Fyllingen BBK	3–2	Kongsberg Miners
2025–26	Fyllingen BBK	3–2	Gimle

== Awards ==
=== Most Valuable Player ===
Year	Player	Position	Nationality	Team
2011–12	Stian Mjøs	PG	Norway	Bærum Basket
2012–13	Gerald Walace	F	United States	Tromsø Storm
2015–16	Mike Bruesewitz	F	United States	Bærum Basket
2016–17	Juan Ferrales	PG	United States	Kongsberg Miners
2017–18	Aksel Bolin	F	Norway	Asker Aliens
2018–19	Milovan Savic	C	Croatia	Gimle Basket
2019–20	Juan Ferrales	PG	United States	Kongsberg Miners
2020–21	Devin Gilligan	G	United States	Froya Basket
2021–22	Wayne Stewart	F	United States	Froya Basket
2022–23	Devin Gilligan	G/F	United States	Fyllingen BBK
2023–24	Terrell Brown	G	United States	Fyllingen BBK
2024–25	Dashawn Davis	G	United States	Fyllingen BBK
2025–26	Joshua Keyes	F	United States	Fyllingen BBK

=== Finals MVP ===
Year	Player	Position	Nationality	Team
2011–12	Miilah Kombat	F	Norway	Frøya Basket
2013–14	Audun Eskeland	PG	Norway	Gimle Basket
2014–15	Anders Stien	SG	Norway	Asker Aliens
2015–16	Roy Nwachukwu	F	Norway	Centrum Tigers
2016–17	Aksel Bolin	F	Norway	Centrum Tigers
2017–18	Brian Voelkel	F	(Republic of Ireland) Ireland	Kongsberg Miners
2018–19	Robert Hubbs	SG	United States	Kongsberg Miners
2021–22	Milovan Savic	C	Croatia	Gimle Basket
2022–23	Jørgen Odfjell	F	Norway	Gimle Basket
2023–24	Terrell Brown	G	United States	Fyllingen BBK
2024–25	Dashawn Davis	G	United States	Fyllingen BBK

=== Young Player of the Year ===
Year	Player	Position	Nationality	Team
2011–12	Magnus Midtvedt	G	Norway	Asker Aliens
2012–13	Marko Lepovic	SG	Serbia	Centrum Tigers
2014–15	Johannes Dolven	F	Norway	Bærum Basket
2015–16	Harald Eika Frey	PG	Norway	Centrum Tigers
2016–17	Lars Fredrik Espe	PG	Norway	Gimle
2017–18	Mikal Gjerde	SG	Norway	Kongsberg Miners
2018–19	Sigurd Lorange	PG	Norway	Gimle
2019–20	Jørgen Odfjell	G	Norway	Gimle
2021–22	Hallvard Venstad Staff	F	Norway	Tromsø Storm
2022–23	Oscar Hellebust	C	Norway	Bærum Basket
2023–24	Reidar Greve	PG	Norway	Gimle
2024–25	Sivert Nordheim	G/F	Norway	Centrum Tigers
2025–26	Kevin Leraand	G	Norway	Nidaros Jets

=== Defensive Player of the Year ===
Year	Player	Position	Nationality	Team
2011–12	Anthony Lee-Ingram	F	United States	Asker Aliens
2012–13	Delano Thomas	PF	United States	Gimle
2015–16	Eric Gilchrese	G	United States	Ammerud Basket
2016–17	Eric Gilchrese	G	United States	Bærum Basket
2017–18	Fred Thomas	G	United States	Kongsberg Miners
2018–19	Milovan Savic	C	Serbia	Gimle
2019–20	Eric Gilchrese	PG	United States	Asker Aliens
2021–22	Lars Fredrik Espe	PG	Norway	Gimle
2022–23	Jacob Tryon	C	United States	Oppsal Panthers
2023–24	Xavier Fuller	G	United States	Tromsø Storm
2024–25	Jacob Tryon	C	United States	Frøya
2025–26	Jamal Poplar	PF	United States	Frøya
