= Bærum Basket =

- Leagues: BLNO
- Founded: 1963 (as Bærum BBK)
- Arena: Rykkinn Hall
- Location: Bærum, Norway
- Team colors: Light Blue and Dark Blue
- President: Knut Ola Staver
- Team manager: Johan Dolven
- Head coach: Pal Berg
- Championships: 4 Norwegian BLNO; 1 Norwegian Cup
- Website: barumbasket.no
Home	Away

Bærum Basket, also known as Bærum Basket Bekkestua, is a professional basketball team based in Bærum, Norway, currently participating in the BLNO, Norway's premier basketball league. It is owned by Knut Ola Staver. The club was founded in the year of 1963 as Bærum Basketball Club, commonly referred to as simply Bærum BBK. Bærum is historically known to be one of the most successful teams in the BLNO, tied with Asker Aliens B.C. for the most league championships. Bærum Basket has won 4 BLNO league championships and 1 Norwegian Cup dating back to the creation of the BLNO league.

Some of the most prominent players that have been with Bærum Basket in recent years include: Stian Mjos, Keith Thompson, and Donald Oatis. These players have all been playing under the coaching of Pal Berg.

== History ==
=== Establishment ===
In the spring of 1963, Jan Petter Hansen— a physical education teacher at Valler Upper Secondary School— initiated the first official basketball club in the entire country of Norway, with the help of the Norwegian Confederation of Sports (NIF). Known as the Bærum Basketball Club, or the Bærum BBK, the club first consisted of eleven players.

=== Rise of Bærum BBK (1964–1978) ===
Bærum BBK earned its first prize in the spring of 1964, the "Fair Play Trophy", an inspiration that would start a whole new era in the entire club's history. Interest in the sport rapidly increased in the Eikeli area of Bærum, giving the team more and more space for young talent on their roster due to the high recruitment rate.

This was also the period of time in which the club was seeing an increase in the number of Americans on the court, helping them win their first ever tournament, in this case the 1966 Coca-Cola Cup. The Coca-Cola Cup was an opening tournament that took place in the fall.

Bærum BBK's first league championship came in mid-1968, a period that is widely considered to be the club's first and greatest triumph. Toppling their chief rivals, OSI, with a score of 59-58, Aftenposten, Norway's largest newspaper, described the game as "the best basketball played in Norway."

== Players ==
=== Current roster ===
Note: Flags indicate national team eligibility at FIBA-sanctioned events. Players may hold other non-FIBA nationalities not displayed.

Bærum Basket roster
Players
Coaches

Pos.	No.	Nat.	Name	Ht.	Wt.	Age
PG	4	(Norway)	Elgmork, Magnus	1.80 m (5 ft 11 in)		30 – 19 October 1995
G	5	(Sweden)	Leguia, Joe	1.93 m (6 ft 4 in)		38 – 12 May 1987
F/C	5	(Norway)	Borke, Lars	1.98 m (6 ft 6 in)		31 – 31 August 1994
PG	6	(Norway)	Frey, Harald	1.83 m (6 ft 0 in)		28 – 27 May 1997
PF	7	(Norway)	Harto, Lars	1.99 m (6 ft 6 in)		33 – 4 March 1993
PG	8	(Norway)	Nymo, Anders	1.82 m (6 ft 0 in)		29 – 20 August 1996
SF	9	(Norway)	Staver, Sigurd	1.99 m (6 ft 6 in)		31 – 6 July 1994
F/C	10	(United States)	Steed, Austin	2.03 m (6 ft 8 in)	107 kg (236 lb)	37 – 20 June 1988
PG	11	(Norway)	Mjos, Stian	1.83 m (6 ft 0 in)	82 kg (181 lb)	37 – 27 February 1989
F	12	(Norway)	Andreassen, Bjornar	2.04 m (6 ft 8 in)		36 – 3 April 1989
F	13	(United States)	Roesch, Lukas	1.97 m (6 ft 6 in)		35 – 23 July 1990
PF	14	(Norway)	Dolven, Johannes	1.98 m (6 ft 6 in)		29 – 11 May 1996
SG	15	(Norway)	Skara, Nils-Paul	1.85 m (6 ft 1 in)	84 kg (185 lb)	38 – 26 March 1987
SG	33	(Norway)	Berg, Daniel	1.96 m (6 ft 5 in)		39 – 14 September 1986
G	33	(Norway)	Henriksen, Jorgen			29 – 24 April 1996

Head coach

- (Norway) Pal Berg

Legend

- (C) Team captain
- Injured

- Roster
Updated: March 9, 2014

=== Depth chart ===
Pos.	Starting 5	Bench 1	Bench 2	Bench 3
C	Austin Steed
PF	Lars Harto	Johannes Dolven
SF	Lukas Roesch	Sigurd Staver
SG	Nils-Paul Skara	Joe Leguia	Daniel Berg	Bjornar Andreassen
PG	Stian Mjos	Harald Frey	Anders Nymo	Magnus Elgmork
