= Asker Aliens =

Basketball team in Asker, Norway

Asker Aliens B.C.
- Leagues: BLNO
- Founded: 1963
- Arena: Leikvollhallen
- Capacity: 2500
- Location: Asker
- Team colors: Gold, Black
- Championships: 5 (BLNO)
Home	Away

Asker Aliens is a professional basketball club from Asker, Norway. The club plays in the BLNO, the top tier basketball league in Norway.

The club was founded as Asker Basketball Club in 1963 and then merged with Torstad Basketballklubb in 1993.

== Honours ==
- BLNO

Winners (5): 2002–03, 2004–05, 2007–08, 2009–10, 2014–15

== Notable players ==
Note: Flags indicate national team eligibility at FIBA-sanctioned events. Players may hold other non-FIBA nationalities not displayed.

Criteria

To appear in this section a player must have either:

- Set a club record or won an individual award while at the club
- Played at least one official international match for their national team at any time
- Played at least one official NBA match at any time.

- (Democratic Republic of the Congo) Djo Loo Yele
- (Norway) Espen Stien
- (United States) Rodney Hawthorne
- (Norway) Ludvig Bergh
- (Uganda) Stanley Ocitti
  (1 season: 2004–05)
