= List of indoor arenas in Kosovo =

The following is a list of indoor arenas in Kosovo, ordered by capacity. The venues are by their final capacity after construction for seating-only events. There is more capacity if standing room is included (e.g. for concerts).

== Current arenas ==
Image	Arena	Capacity	City	Team	Inaugurated	Inside arena
	Pallati i Rinisë	8,000; 2,500	Pristina	KB Prishtina	1978	
	Palestra "Mizahir Isma"	2,500	Rahovec	KB Rahoveci	2019	
	Minatori	4,500	Mitrovica	KB Trepça	1984	
	Sezai Surroi	3,000	Prizren	Bashkimi Prizren	1945	
	Habib Zogaj	2,100	Malisheva	KB Malisheva	2012	
	1 Tetori	2,000	Pristina	KB RTV21/KB Bora		
	Karagaç	2,000	Peja	KB Peja	1993	
	Adem Jashari hall	2,000	Klina	KB Klina	2016	
	Bill Clinton hall	2,000	Ferizaj	KB Kastrioti		
	Shani Nushi hall	2,000	Gjakova	KB Vëllaznimi		
	City arena	2,000	Gračanica	Graçanicë	2017	
	13 Qershori	1,800	Suva Reka	KB Ylli	2005	
	City sports hall	1,700	Shtime	KV Vjosa	2019	
	Bashkim Selishta	1,700	Gjilan	KB Drita		
	City sports hall	1,500	Istog	KB Istogu	2020	
	City sports hall	1,400	Drenas	KB Drenasi/KB Feronikeli	2014	
	Adem Jashari hall	1,200	Kastriot	KB KEKU	2014	
	City sports hall	1,200	Kaçanik	KB Lepenci	2022	
	City sports hall	1,200	Deçan	KH Deçani	2020	
	City sports hall	1,200	Lipjan	KB Lipjani	2023	
	Jeton Terstena	1,200	Vushtrri	KB Kosova	1963	
	Palestra Fushë Kosovë	1,100	Fushë Kosova	KB Fushë Kosova	2025	
	City sports hall	1,100	Leposavić	KK Kopaonik	2011	
	Panair and sports center	1,000	Greme		2023	
	City sports hall	800	Skenderaj	KV Skenderaj	2021	
	City arena	640	Zvečan	Zveçan	2023	
	Universi sports hall	620	Pristina	KB Universi	2012	
	Hakif Zejnullahu	600	Podujevë	KB Llapi	2006	
	Don Bosko	600	Pristina	KB Don Bosko	2016	
	City sports hall	600	Zubin Potok	KK Mokra Gora	2007	
	City sports hall	550	North Mitrovica	KK Mitrovica	2019	
	Dardana sports hall	500	Dardanë	KB Dardana	2017	
	Samadrexha sports hall	450	Samadrexhë	KH Samadrexha	2020	
	Dilloni sports hall	400	Kosovo Polje	KB Fushë Kosova	2005	
	Omnisport	300	Mitrovica	KH Trepça (until 2020)	2017	

== Under construction/proposed ==
Photo U/C	Location	Arena	Capacity	Status	Opening	Inside Arena U/C
	Viti	Palestra Viti	1,300	U/C	2021	
	Zhegër	Palestra Zhegër	1,300	U/C	-	
	Dragash	Palestra Dragash	1,200	U/C	2021	
	Štrpce	Palestra Shtërpcë	1,200	U/C	-	
	Zahaq	Zahaq Arena	1,000	U/C	2021	
	Podujevë	Palestra Podujevë	2,500	U/C	-	

== See also ==
- List of indoor arenas in Europe
- List of indoor arenas by capacity
