= 2015–16 Kosovo Basketball Superleague =

- Duration: 3 October 2015 – 18 May 2016
- Games played: 196 (regular season); 12 (Playoffs)
- Teams: 7
- TV partner(s): RTV21; DigitAlb (SuperSport)

Regular season
- Season MVP: (Kosovo) Drilon Hajrizi

Finals
- Champions: Sigal Prishtina (11th title)
- Runners-up: Peja
- Finals MVP: (Kosovo) Dardan Berisha

Awards
- Rookie o/t Year: (Kosovo) Samir Zekiqi
- Defender o/t Year: (Kosovo) Urim Zenelaj

Statistical leaders
Points	(Kosovo) Urim Zenelaj	23.2
Rebounds	(Kosovo) Urim Zenelaj	15.9
Assists	(Kosovo) Altin Morina	6.7

The 2015–16 Kosovo Basketball Superleague season was the 22nd season of the Kosovo Basketball Superleague, the highest professional basketball league in Kosovo. The season started on 3 October 2015 and ended on 18 May 2016.

Two days before the new season, Kastrioti decided to leave the league due to financial problems so the league will remain with 7 teams for this season. Sigal Prishtina was the defending champion.

== Venues and locations ==
Kosovo Basketball Superleague – club locations

Teams that play in the 2015–16 BIBL season

Team	City	Venue	Capacity
Bashkimi	Prizren	Palestra Sportive Sezair Surroi	3,200
Kerasan◆	Pristina	Pallati i Rinisë dhe Sporteve	2,500
Peja ◆	Peja	Karagaq Sports Hall	3,500
Sigal Prishtina	Pristina	Pallati i Rinisë dhe Sporteve	2,500
Trepça	Mitrovica	Salla e sporteve Minatori	4,100
Vëllaznimi	Gjakova	Shani Nushi Sports Hall	2,500
KB Ylli	Suva Reka	Salla e sporteve "13 Qërshori"	1,800

Notes

◆ Promoted from the 2014–15 Liga e Parë.
◆ Promoted via Wild Card (see 2014–15 season)

== Arena standards ==
This season, the facilities of the clubs participating in Kosovo Basketball Superleague and hosting the home matches, must have a minimum capacity of 1,000 people.

== Regular season ==
Pos	Team	Pld	W	L	PF	PA	PD	Pts	Qualification or relegation
1	Peja	24	23	1	1672	1254	+418	47	Qualification to playoffs
2	Sigal Prishtina	24	20	4	1481	1082	+399	44	Qualification to playoffs
3	Bashkimi	24	16	8	1338	1176	+162	40	Qualification to playoffs
4	Trepça	24	11	13	1212	1198	+14	35	Qualification to playoffs
5	Golden Eagle Ylli	24	10	14	1317	1367	−50	34	
6	Vëllaznimi	24	3	21	1215	1612	−397	27	
7	Kerasan	24	1	23	1190	1736	−546	25	Relegation Playoffs

Source: Kosovo Basketball Federation

== Playoffs ==
Semifinals
1	Peja	3
4	Trepça	0
2	Sigal Prishtina	3
3	Bashkimi	1

Finals
1	Peja	2
2	Sigal Prishtina	3

== Finals ==
Team 1	Series	Team 2	Game 1	Game 2	Game 3	Game 4	Game 5
KB Peja	2–3	KB Prishtina	77–76	64-71	66-63	55-80	65-70

=== 1st leg ===
8 May 2016
20:30

KB Peja	77–76	KB Prishtina
Scoring by quarter: 23–15, 18-26, 16–20, 20–15
Pts: Roland Davis, Alban Veseli 16; Rebs: Drilon Hajrizi 8 Asts: Drilon Hajrizi 5		Pts: Andrew Warren 16, Edmond Azemi 15; Rebs: Jason Washburn 6 Asts: Willie Kemp 5
1–0

Karagaç Sports Hall, Peja
Attendance: 2500
Referees: Zafer Yilmaz (Turkey) Faton Kurshumlija (Kosovo) Xhelal Mumini (Kosovo)

=== 2nd leg ===
12 May 2016
20:30

KB Prishtina	71–64	KB Peja
Scoring by quarter: 16–10, 16-18, 24-20, 15-16
Pts: Dardan Berisha 22, Jason Washburn 18; Rebs: Jason Washburn 10; Asts: Dardan Berisha, Willie Kemp 5		Pts: Roland Davis, Kevin Burwell 15; Rebs: Fisnik Rugova 8 Asts: Drilon Hajrizi 5
1–1

Palace of Youth and Sports, Pristina
Attendance: 2500
Referees: Zafer Yilmaz (Turkey) Daut Mehmeti (Kosovo) Xhelal Mumini (Kosovo)

== Awards ==
- MVP: (Kosovo) Drilon Hajrizi– KB Peja
- Finals MVP: (Kosovo) Dardan Berisha – Sigal Prishtina
- Foreigner MVP: (United States) Jason Washburn – Sigal Prishtina
- Coach of the Year: (Cyprus) Antonis Constantinides – Sigal Prishtina
