= 2017–18 Kosovo Basketball Superleague =

- Games played: 224 (regular season); 9–15 (Playoffs)
- Teams: 8
- TV partner(s): RTV21; DigitAlb (SuperSport)

Regular season
- Relegated: Kerasan

Finals
- Champions: Bashkimi (1st title)
- Runners-up: Sigal Prishtina

Statistical leaders
| Points | (Kosovo) Samir Zekiqi (Trepça) | 23.3 |

The 2017–18 IP Superliga e Basketbollit is the 24th season of the Kosovo Basketball Superleague.

== Teams ==
IP Superliga e Basketbollit – club locations

KB Borea Peja promoted to the league after winning 2016–17 Kosovo Basketball First League and replaced Vëllaznimi, that was relegated from the previous season.

| Team | City | Venue | Capacity |
|---|---|---|---|
| Bashkimi | Prizren | Palestra Sportive Sezair Surroi | 3,000 |
| Borea Peja | Peja | Karagaq Sports Hall | 3,000 |
| Golden Eagle Ylli | Suva Reka | Salla e sporteve "13 Qërshori" | 1,800 |
| Kerasan | Pristina | Pallati i Rinisë dhe Sporteve | 2,500 |
| Peja | Peja | Karagaq Sports Hall | 3,000 |
| Rahoveci | Rahovec | Salla e Sporteve Rahovec | 1,800 |
| Sigal Prishtina | Pristina | Pallati i Rinisë dhe Sporteve | 2,500 |
| Trepça | Mitrovica | Salla e sporteve Minatori | 2,800 |

== Regular season ==
| Pos | Team | Pld | W | L | PF | PA | PD | Pts | Qualification or relegation |
|---|---|---|---|---|---|---|---|---|---|
| 1 | Sigal Prishtina | 28 | 27 | 1 | 2778 | 1939 | +839 | 55 | Qualification to playoffs |
| 2 | Bashkimi | 28 | 23 | 5 | 2552 | 2011 | +541 | 51 | Qualification to playoffs |
| 3 | Rahoveci | 28 | 16 | 12 | 2378 | 2289 | +89 | 44 | Qualification to playoffs |
| 4 | Golden Eagle Ylli | 28 | 15 | 13 | 2553 | 2402 | +151 | 43 | Qualification to playoffs |
| 5 | Trepça | 28 | 12 | 16 | 2176 | 2342 | −166 | 40 | |
| 6 | Peja | 28 | 8 | 20 | 2118 | 2536 | −418 | 36 | |
| 7 | Borea | 28 | 7 | 21 | 2226 | 2711 | −485 | 35 | Qualification for relegation playoffs |
| 8 | Kerasan | 28 | 4 | 24 | 2115 | 2666 | −551 | 32 | Relegation to Kosovo Basketball First League |

Source: Kosovo Basketball Federation

== Playoffs ==
Playoffs were played in a best-of-five playoff format. The higher seeded teams played game 1, 2 and 5 at home in the semifinals and games 1, 3 and 5 in the finals.

Semi-finals
Sigal Prishtina | 84 | 80 | 78
Golden Eagle Ylli | 76 | 75 | 68
Bashkimi | 105 | 114 | 106
Rahoveci | 79 | 86 | 91

Final
Sigal Prishtina | 81 | 80 | 88 | 61
Bashkimi | 84 | 97 | 77 | 77
