= 2022–23 Kosovo Basketball Superleague =

- Duration: 10 October 2022 – 18 May 2023
- Teams: 8
- TV partners: K-Sport; Art Sport

Regular season
- Season MVP: (United States) Dustin Thomas (Prishtina)
- Relegated: Rahoveci

Finals
- Champions: Peja (6th title)
- Runners-up: Trepça
- Finals MVP: (United States) Jalen Tate (Peja)

Statistical leaders
Points	(United States) Dachon Burke (Ponte Prizreni)	25.7
Rebounds	(United States) Damonte Dodd (Vëllaznimi)	12.0
Assists	(United States) Jahii Carson (Rahoveci)	6.0

The 2022–23 Kosovo Basketball SuperLeague was the 29th season of the Kosovo Basketball Superleague. The season started on 10 October 2022 and ended on 15 May 2023. Peja won its sixth title.

== Teams ==
Vëllaznimi has been promoted to the league after winning 2021–22 Kosovo Basketball First League.

== Venues and locations ==
Kosovo Basketball Superleague – club locations

Team	City	Venue	Capacity
Bashkimi Prizren	Prizren	Sezair Surroi	3,200
Peja	Peja	Karagaq Sports Hall	3,500
Proton Cable Prizreni	Prizren	Sezair Surroi	3,200
Rahoveci	Rahovec	Mizahir Isma	4,000
Sigal Prishtina	Pristina	Pallati i Rinisë dhe Sporteve	2,500
Trepça●	Mitrovica	Salla e sporteve Minatori	3,500
Vëllaznimi◆	Gjakova	Shani Nushi Sports Hall	2,500
Ylli●	Suva Reka	Salla e sporteve "13 Qërshori"	1,800

Notes

◆ Promoted from the 2021–22 Kosovo Basketball First League.
● Teams that play in the 2022–23 FIBA Europe Cup

== Regular season ==
Pos	Team	Pld	W	L	PF	PA	PD	Pts	Qualification or relegation
1	Prishtina	28	22	6	2300	1919	+381	50	Qualification to playoffs
2	Peja	28	21	7	2299	2091	+208	49	Qualification to playoffs
3	Golden Eagle Ylli	28	20	8	2185	2042	+143	48	Qualification to playoffs
4	Trepça	28	17	11	2254	2137	+117	45	Qualification to playoffs
5	Bashkimi Prizren	28	11	17	2180	2237	−57	39	Qualification to playoffs
6	Vëllaznimi	28	9	19	2113	2337	−224	37	Qualification to playoffs
7	Proton Cable Prizreni	28	8	20	2198	2383	−185	36	Qualification for relegation playoffs
8	Rahoveci	28	4	24	2142	2525	−383	32	Relegation to Liga e Parë

Source: Top Sporti

== Playoffs ==
The quarter-finals were played in a best-of-three playoff format.
The semi-finals and finals were played in a best-of-five playoff format. The higher seeded teams played game one, three and five (if necessary) at home.

=== Bracket ===
Quarter-finals
Golden Eagle Ylli	2
Vëllaznimi	0
Trepça	2
Bashkimi	0

Semi-finals
Peja	3
Golden Eagle Ylli	1
Prishtina	2
Trepça	3

Finals
Peja	3
Trepça	2

=== Quarter-finals ===
Team 1	Series	Team 2	Game 1	Game 2	Game 3
Golden Eagle Ylli	2–0	Vëllaznimi	111–86	126–80	
Trepça	2–0	Bashkimi	92–88	96–79	

=== Semi-finals ===
Team 1	Series	Team 2	Game 1	Game 2	Game 3	Game 4	Game 5
Peja	3–1	Golden Eagle Ylli	85–82	86–76	104–107	100–90	
Prishtina	2–3	Trepça	82–70	68–77	87–71	77–82	74–77

=== Finals ===
Team 1	Series	Team 2	Game 1	Game 2	Game 3	Game 4	Game 5
Peja	3–2	Trepça	86–94	107–79	90–97	87–83	93–91

== Play-out ==
Ponte Prizreni defeated Bora in the relegation playoffs.

== Kosovan clubs in European competitions ==
Team	Competition	Progress
Golden Eagle Ylli	Champions League	Qualifying tournament
Golden Eagle Ylli	FIBA Europe Cup	Regular season
Trepça	FIBA Europe Cup	Qualifying tournament
Prishtina	FIBA Europe Cup	Qualifying tournament
