= Samir Zekiqi =

Kosovan basketball player

No. 21 – Vëllaznimi
- Position: Forward
- League: Kosovo Superleague

Personal information
- Born: 23 January 1995 (age 31) Kosovska Mitrovica, FR Yugoslavia (present-day Mitrovica, Kosovo)
- Listed height: 6 ft 8 in (2.03 m)
- Listed weight: 215.6 lb (98 kg)

Career information
- College: Karşıyaka Yamanlar College (2011)
- NBA draft: 2018: undrafted
- Playing career: 2012–present

Career history
- 2012: Trepça
- 2012–2014: RTV21
- 2014–2015: Trepça
- 2015–2016: Peja
- 2016–2017: Trepça
- 2017: Bashkimi
- 2017–2019: Trepça
- 2019–2021: Ylli
- 2021–2022: Trepça
- 2022–2023: Peja
- 2023–2025: Bashkimi
- 2025–present: Vëllaznimi

Career highlights
- 2x Kosovo Superleague: (2021, 2023); 2x Kosovo Cup winner (2015, 2022); Liga Unike champion (2021); Kosovo Superleague top scorer: (2018); Rookie of the Kosovo Superleague: (2016)

Samir Zekiqi (born 23 January 1995) is a Kosovan professional basketball player for Vëllaznimi of the Kosovo Superleague. He is part of the Kosovo national team.

== Early life and college career ==
Born in Mitrovicë, Zekiqi started his youth career for Trepça. In the beginning of 2011, he became part of Maliye Milli. Later he became part of the Karşıyaka Yamanlar College where his teammates were Egemen Güven, Hüseyin Nuriler and many others.

== Professional career ==
=== Trepça (2016–2017) ===
On October 4, 2016, Zekiqi signed for Trepça of the Kosovo Superleague and BIBL. Zekiqi averaged 16.4 points per game in the 2016–17 Kosovo Superleague season and 8.4 points per game in the 2016–17 Balkan League season.

=== Ylli (2019–2021) ===
On August 19, 2019, Zekiqi signed for Ylli of the Kosovo Superleague.

=== Peja (2022–2023) ===
On 6 December 2022, Zekiqi signed for Peja of the Kosovo Superleague, Liga Unike and BIBL.

=== Vëllaznimi (2025–present) ===
On 3 July 2025, he signed for Vëllaznimi of the Kosovo Superleague.

== International career ==
Zekiqi was one of the first players of Kosovo and his official debut with Kosovo came on 14 September 2016 in the EuroBasket 2017 qualification match against Ukraine.

== Personal life ==
Samir Zekiqi's brothers Burim and Ramadan are also professional basketball players.

== Honours ==
=== Trepça ===
- Kosovo Cup (2022)

=== Ylli ===
- Kosovo Superleague: (2021)
- Liga Unike: (2021)

=== Peja ===
- Kosovo Superleague: (2023)
- Kosovo Cup (2015)

=== Individual awards ===
- Kosovo Superleague top scorer: (2018)
- Rookie of the year in the Kosovo Superleague: (2016)
