= 2016–17 Kosovo Basketball Superleague =

- Duration: 8 October 2016 – 24 May 2017
- Games played: 224 (regular season); 9–15 (Playoffs)
- Teams: 8
- TV partners: RTV21; DigitAlb (SuperSport)

Regular season
- Relegated: Vëllaznimi

Finals
- Champions: Sigal Prishtina (13th title)
- Runners-up: Bashkimi Prizren

The 2016–17 Kosovo Basketball SuperLeague was the 23rd season of the Kosovo Basketball Superleague. The season started on 8 October 2016 and ended on 24 May 2017. Sigal Prishtina won its thirteenth title.

== Teams ==
KB Rahoveci has been promoted to the league after winning 2015–16 Kosovo Basketball First League. KB Kastrioti who finished in last place during the 2015-2016 season, relegated from the Super League

== Venues and locations ==
Kosovo Basketball Superleague – club locations

Teams that play in the Balkan International Basketball League

Team	City	Venue	Capacity
Bashkimi Prizren	Prizren	Palestra Sportive Sezair Surroi	3,200
Kerasan	Pristina	Pallati i Rinisë dhe Sporteve	2,500
Peja ●	Peja	Karagaq Sports Hall	3,500
Rahoveci ◆	Rahovec	Salla e Sporteve Rahovec	1,500
Sigal Prishtina ●	Pristina	Pallati i Rinisë dhe Sporteve	2,500
Trepça	Mitrovica	Salla e sporteve Minatori	4,100
Vëllaznimi	Gjakova	Shani Nushi Sports Hall	2,500
Ylli	Suva Reka	Salla e sporteve "13 Qërshori"	1,800

Notes

◆ Promoted from the 2015–16 Kosovo Basketball First League.
● Teams that play in the 2016–17 FIBA Europe Cup

== Regular season ==
Pos	Team	Pld	W	L	PF	PA	PD	Pts	Qualification or relegation
1	Sigal Prishtina	26	23	3	2497	1895	+602	49	Qualification to playoffs
2	Bashkimi Prizren	26	21	5	2333	1851	+482	47	Qualification to playoffs
3	Peja	26	20	6	2331	1772	+559	46	Qualification to playoffs
4	Trepça	26	17	9	2167	1839	+328	43	Qualification to playoffs
5	Golden Eagle Ylli	26	10	16	2127	2310	−183	36	
6	Rahoveci	26	9	17	1942	2188	−246	35	
7	Kerasan	26	2	24	1748	2527	−779	28	Qualification for relegation playoffs
8	Vëllaznimi	26	2	24	1903	2553	−650	28	Relegation to Liga e Parë

Source: Kosovo Basketball Federation

== Playoffs ==
The semi-finals and finals were played in a best-of-five playoff format. The higher seeded teams played game one, three and five (if necessary) at home.

Semi-finals
1 Sigal Prishtina	89	119	104
4 Trepça	78	77	82
2 Bashkimi Prizren	116	94	117
3 Peja	87	65	96

Final
1 Sigal Prishtina	66	78	81	73
2 Bashkimi Prizren	76	73	65	64

== Play-out ==
Kerasan Prishtina defeated Drita in the relegation playoffs.
