= Kosovo men's national basketball team results (2016–2019) =

This is a list of Kosovo men's national basketball team results from 2016, to 2019.

== Fixtures and results ==
=== 2016 ===
31 August EuroBasket 2017 qualification	Slovenia	113–68	Kosovo	Ljubljana, Slovenia
20:00	Scoring by quarter: 33–19, 31–12, 20–18, 29–19
	Pts: G. Dragić 22; Rebs: three players 6 Asts: G. Dragić 8	Boxscore	Pts: Berisha 21; Rebs: F. Rugova 7 Asts: Berisha, Doellman 3	Arena: Arena Stožice; Attendance: 3,500; Referees: Carmelo Paternico (ITA), Marek Cmikiewicz (POL), David Romano (ISR)

3 September EuroBasket 2017 qualification	Kosovo	63–70	Ukraine	Mitrovica, Kosovo
20:00	Scoring by quarter: 17–17, 17–15, 18–20, 11–18
	Pts: Doellman 20; Rebs: Hajrizi 6 Asts: Sina 6	Boxscore	Pts: Korniyenko 20; Rebs: three players 5 Asts: Lypovyy 5	Arena: Minatori Sports Hall; Attendance: 2,500; Referees: Ciprian Stoica (ROU), Petri Mäntylä (FIN), Yohan Rosso (FRA)

7 September EuroBasket 2017 qualification	Bulgaria	105–84	Kosovo	Botevgrad, Bulgaria
18:00	Scoring by quarter: 22–25, 18–15, 32–16, 33–28
	Pts: Georgiev 28; Rebs: Vezenkov, Zahariev 7 Asts: Bost 10	Boxscore	Pts: Berisha 18; Rebs: Doellman 7 Asts: Doellman 4	Arena: Arena Botevgrad; Attendance: 2,000; Referees: Eddie Viator (FRA), Alexander Romanov (RUS), Andrei Sharapa (BLR)

10 September EuroBasket 2017 qualification	Kosovo	81–91	Slovenia	Mitrovica, Kosovo
20:00	Scoring by quarter: 21–17, 20–21, 19–23
	Pts: Doellman 30; Rebs: F. Rugova 6 Asts: Berisha 8	Boxscore	Pts: Prepelič 27; Rebs: Prepelič, Vidmar 9 Asts: Rebec 4	Arena: Minatori Sports Hall; Attendance: 2,500; Referees: Emilio Pérez (ESP), Tomas Jasevičius (LTU), Piotr Pastusiak (POL)

14 September EuroBasket 2017 qualification	Ukraine	100–61	Kosovo	Vilnius, Lithuania (Note: The Ukraine v Kosovo match was played in a neutral arena due to Ukraine's non-recognition of Kosovo's travel documents.)
19:00	Scoring by quarter: 30–11, 25–17, 26–8, 19–25
	Pts: Mishula 21; Rebs: Kravtsov 12; Asts: Korniyenko, Lypovyy 5	Boxscore	Pts: Berisha 20; Rebs: Berisha 5 Asts: Ahmetbašić 6	Arena: Sportima Arena; Attendance: 380; Referees: Tanel Suslov (EST), Lorenzo Baldini (ITA), Pavel Fuška (SVK)

17 September EuroBasket 2017 qualification	Kosovo	62–67	Bulgaria	Mitrovica, Kosovo
20:00	Scoring by quarter: 18–20, 10–22, 15–8, 19–17
	Pts: Bamforth 21; Rebs: Veseli 9 Asts: Berisha 5	Boxscore	Pts: Washburn 14; Rebs: Velikov 7 Asts: Velikov 4	Arena: Minatori Sports Hall; Attendance: 1,500; Referees: Ioannis Foufis (GRE), Jean-Charles Collin (FRA), Anne Panther (GER)

=== 2017 ===
2 August 2019 World Cup pre-qualifiers	Kosovo	72–68	Macedonia	Pristina, Kosovo
20:15	Scoring by quarter: 23–11, 17–9, 15–23, 17–25
	Pts: Berisha 28; Rebs: F. Rugova 7 Asts: Mekaj 5	Boxscore	Pts: Theodore 22; Rebs: Čekovski 4 Asts: Theodore 6	Arena: Palace of Youth and Sports; Attendance: 2,500; Referees: Petar Obradović (BIH), Borys Shulga (UKR), Nikolaos Somos (GRE)

9 August 2019 World Cup pre-qualifiers	Estonia	76–50	Kosovo	Tallinn, Estonia
17:30	Scoring by quarter: 17–15, 23–14, 20–12, 16–9
	Pts: Hallik 15; Rebs: Puidet, Talts 6 Asts: Kangur 8	Boxscore	Pts: Kastrati 11; Rebs: Veseli 6 Asts: Berisha 4	Arena: Saku Suurhall; Attendance: 3,000; Referees: Apostolos Kalpakas (SWE), Vincent Delestrée (BEL), Mārtiņš Kozlovskis (LAT)

12 August 2019 World Cup pre-qualifiers	Macedonia	87–74	Kosovo	Skopje, Macedonia
20:30	Scoring by quarter: 19–22, 21–19, 23–13, 24–20
	Pts: Theodore 24; Rebs: Theodore 9 Asts: Kostoski 5	Boxscore	Pts: F. Rugova 17; Rebs: Shoshi 6 Asts: Berisha 7	Arena: Boris Trajkovski Sports Center; Referees: Tolga Sahin (ITA), Marius Ciulin (ROU), Dariusz Zapolski (POL)

19 August 2019 World Cup pre-qualifiers	Kosovo	75–69	Estonia	Pristina, Kosovo
20:15	Scoring by quarter: 24–22, 11–16, 19–14, 21–17
	Pts: Berisha 28; Rebs: Shoshi 10; Asts: Berisha 6	Boxscore	Pts: Jõesaar 13; Rebs: Paasoja, Talts 5 Asts: Paasoja 5	Arena: Palace of Youth and Sports; Attendance: 2,500; Referees: Srđan Dožai (CRO), Markos Michaelides (SUI), Marko Vučković (SLO)

24 November 2019 World Cup qualifiers	Kosovo	61–99	Lithuania	Pristina, Kosovo
19:00	Scoring by quarter: 21–20, 14–15, 12–25, 14–39
	Pts: Berisha 19; Rebs: three players 4 Asts: Berisha 5	Boxscore	Pts: Juškevičius 16; Rebs: Gailius 8 Asts: Girdžiūnas 7	Arena: Palace of Youth and Sports; Attendance: 2,200; Referees: Luis Castillo (ESP), Boris Krejič (SLO), Ventsislav Velikov (BUL)

26 November 2019 World Cup qualifiers	Hungary	84–76	Kosovo	Debrecen, Hungary
19:00	Scoring by quarter: 20–21, 15–15, 24–15, 25–25
	Pts: Vojvoda, Wittmann 20; Rebs: Allen 10; Asts: Wittmann 6	Boxscore	Pts: Berisha 22; Rebs: Shoshi 11; Asts: Bamforth, Berisha 4	Arena: Főnix Hall; Attendance: 5,145; Referees: Ademir Zurapović (BIH), Anastasios Pilosdis (GRE), Andrei Sharapa (BLR)

=== 2018 ===
23 February 2019 World Cup qualifiers	Poland	90–62	Kosovo	Włocławek, Poland
19:00	Scoring by quarter: 20–12, 28–14, 26–19, 16–17
	Pts: Gruszecki 18; Rebs: Cel, Ponitka 7 Asts: Koszarek 5	Boxscore	Pts: Berisha 23; Rebs: Jones 9 Asts: Berisha 4	Arena: Hala Mistrzów; Attendance: 3,421; Referees: Zafer Yılmaz (TUR), Ivor Matejek (CZE), Özlem Yalman (TUR)

26 February 2019 World Cup qualifiers	Lithuania	106–50	Kosovo	Klaipėda, Lithuania
19:30	Scoring by quarter: 28–19, 20–8, 26–12, 32–11
	Pts: Bendžius 22; Rebs: Echodas 8 Asts: Girdžiūnas 9	Boxscore	Pts: Jones 23; Rebs: Jones 6 Asts: Mekaj 4	Arena: Švyturio Arena; Attendance: 2,500; Referees: Apostolos Kalpakas (GRE), Marek Kúkelčík (SVK), Paulo Marques (POR)

28 June 2019 World Cup qualifiers	Kosovo	65–81	Hungary	Pristina, Kosovo
20:30	Scoring by quarter: 19–29, 20–10, 13–18, 13–24
	Pts: Berisha 17; Rebs: Grosha 6 Asts: Berisha 9	Boxscore	Pts: Govens 13; Rebs: Eilingsfeld 8 Asts: Govens 5	Arena: Palace of Youth and Sports; Attendance: 850; Referees: Nicolas Maestre (FRA), Sergiy Zashchuk (UKR), Petr Hrůša (CZE)

1 July 2019 World Cup qualifiers	Kosovo	70–103	Poland	Pristina, Kosovo
20:30	Scoring by quarter: 23–30, 11–27, 25–23, 11–23
	Pts: Kastrati 21; Rebs: Kapiti 7 Asts: Berisha 6	Boxscore	Pts: Gruszecki 21; Rebs: Lampe 10; Asts: Koszarek 11	Arena: Palace of Youth and Sports; Attendance: 250; Referees: Zafer Yılmaz (TUR), Radomir Vojinović (MNE), Erez Gurion (ISR)

13 September EuroBasket 2022 pre-qualifiers	Kosovo	73–76	Macedonia	Pristina, Kosovo
20:30	Scoring by quarter: 16–20, 13–14, 20–14, 24–28
	Pts: Berisha 32; Rebs: Shoshi 9 Asts: Bamforth 8	Boxscore	Pts: Trajkovski 17; Rebs: Hendrix 12; Asts: Sokolov 5	Arena: Palace of Youth and Sports; Attendance: 2,500; Referees: Lorenzo Baldini (ITA), Mart Uuehendrik (EST), Christoph Rohacky (AUT)

29 November EuroBasket 2022 pre-qualifiers	Romania	88–83	Kosovo	Oradea, Romania
19:00	Scoring by quarter: 14–17, 21–18, 24–18, 29–30
	Pts: Watson 19; Rebs: Olah 9 Asts: Torok, Watson 4	Boxscore	Pts: Shoshi 29; Rebs: Shoshi 18; Asts: Berisha, Mekaj 4	Arena: Arena Antonio Alexe; Attendance: 1,850; Referees: Ventsislav Velikov (BUL), Sergii Tyslenko (UKR), Serkan Emlek (TUR)

2 December EuroBasket 2022 pre-qualifiers	Macedonia	78–68	Kosovo	Gevgelija, Macedonia
17:45	Scoring by quarter: 29–16, 10–19, 22–12, 17–21
	Pts: Trajkovski 23; Rebs: Trajkovski 13; Asts: V. Stojanovski 5	Boxscore	Pts: Berisha 19; Rebs: Shoshi 15; Asts: Berisha 5	Arena: Sports Hall "26th April"; Attendance: 2,000; Referees: Srđan Dožai (CRO), Vladimir Tsekov (BUL), Josip Jurčević (CRO)

=== 2019 ===
24 February EuroBasket 2022 pre-qualifiers	Kosovo	75–79	Romania	Pristina, Kosovo
20:30	Scoring by quarter: 21–14, 17–25, 23–17, 14–23
	Pts: Berisha 22; Rebs: Berisha 8 Asts: Berisha, Kastrati 4	Boxscore	Pts: Watson 23; Rebs: Cățe 10; Asts: Cățe 4	Arena: Palace of Youth and Sports; Referees: Nikolaos Somos (GRE), Ernad Karović (BIH), Anastasios Manos (GRE)

3 August EuroBasket 2022 pre-qualifiers	Luxembourg	88–80	Kosovo	Luxembourg City, Luxembourg
19:00	Scoring by quarter: 23–21, 24–25, 19–18, 22–16
	Pts: Laurent 22; Rebs: Vujakovic 9 Asts: Vujakovic 5	Boxscore	Pts: Berisha 23; Rebs: Myles 6 Asts: four players 4	Arena: d'Coque; Attendance: 350; Referees: Siniša Herceg (CRO), Yohan Rosso (FRA), Martin Vulić (CRO)

7 August EuroBasket 2022 pre-qualifiers	Kosovo	63–71	Great Britain	Mitrovica, Kosovo
20:30	Scoring by quarter: 10–15, 17–13, 19–22, 17–21
	Pts: Hajrizi 17; Rebs: Hajrizi 9 Asts: Berisha 5	Boxscore	Pts: Olaseni 15; Rebs: Olaseni 13; Asts: Okereafor 7	Arena: Minatori Sports Hall; Attendance: 2,500; Referees: Yener Yılmaz (TUR), Gentian Cici (ALB), Boris Krejič (SLO)

14 August EuroBasket 2022 pre-qualifiers	Kosovo	109–88	Luxembourg	Pristina, Kosovo
20:30	Scoring by quarter: 30–17, 17–20, 30–25, 32–26
	Pts: Berisha 32; Rebs: Kastrati, Rugova 5 Asts: Berisha 8	Boxscore	Pts: Vujakovic 19; Rebs: Laurent 11; Asts: Grün 8	Arena: Palace of Youth and Sports; Attendance: 1,500; Referees: Georgios Poursanidis (GRE), Martin Horozov (BUL), Gellért Kapitány (HUN)

17 August EuroBasket 2022 pre-qualifiers	Great Britain	101–79	Kosovo	Manchester, Great Britain
19:00	Scoring by quarter: 24–12, 30–20, 24–23, 23–24
	Pts: Hesson, Nelson 19; Rebs: Hesson 9 Asts: Hesson 10	Boxscore	Pts: Hajrizi 22; Rebs: Berisha, Hajrizi 5 Asts: Berisha 11	Arena: Belle Vue Sports Village; Attendance: 1,256; Referees: Tomas Jasevičius (LTU), Gintaras Vitkauskas (LTU), Kristaps Konstantīnovs (LAT)
