= Adis Bećiragić =

Bosnian–Turkish basketball player and coach (born 1970)

Trepça
- Position: Head coach
- League: ProCredit Superliga

Personal information
- Born: 1 June 1970 (age 56) Sarajevo, SFR Yugoslavia
- Listed height: 1.90 m (6 ft 3 in)

Career information
- Playing career: 1990–2000
- Coaching career: 2011–present

Career history

Playing
- 1990–1992: Bosna
- 1992–1993: Zenica Metalno
- 1994–1996: PTT
- 1996–2000: Ülkerspor

Coaching
- 2007–2010: Galatasaray (assistant)
- 2011–2012: Kepez Belediyesi
- 2012–2014: Darüşşafaka
- 2014: Royal Halı Gaziantep
- 2014–2016: Torku Konyaspor
- 2017–2018: Uşak Sportif
- 2020–2021: Peja
- 2020: Iraq
- 2021–2023: Ylli
- 2022–2025: Bosnia and Herzegovina
- 2023–present: Trepça

Career highlights
- As player: Turkish League champion (1998); As head coach: 4× Kosovo League champion (2021, 2022, 2024, 2025); 2× Liga Unike champion (2021, 2024); 3× Kosovo Cup winner (2020, 2024, 2025); 2× Kosovo Supercup winner (2023, 2024); Bosnian Coach of the Year (2025)

Adis Bećiragić (Turkish: Aziz Bekir; born 18 June 1970) is a Bosnian-Turkish professional basketball coach and former player who is currently the head coach for Trepça of the Kosovo ProCredit Superliga. He was a backbone player of the Bosnia and Herzegovina national team team during the 1990s. Bećiragić ended his playing career in 2000, and has worked as a basketball coach since 2007.

== Professional career ==
Born in Sarajevo, SFR Yugoslavia in 1970, Bećiragić started his professional career at former European champions Bosna in 1990. He spent the rest of his career playing for Zenica Metalno, and in Turkey for PTT and Ülkerspor.

Bećiragić was a pivotal member of the Bosnia and Herzegovina national team, and played at the EuroBasket 1993, 1997 and 1999. Bosnia and Herzegovina managed to reach the quarter-finals of the 1993 edition.

== Coaching career ==
Bećiragić started his coaching career as an assistant to Murat Özyer at Galatasaray. He was head coach of Torku Konyaspor between 2013 and 2016, and was head coach for Uşak Sportif from 2017 to 2018.

Bećiragić was appointed head coach of the Bosnia and Herzegovina men's national team in June 2022, ahead of the EuroBasket in September. The team ultimately failed to qualify for the EuroBasket knockout stage. In February 2025, he managed to qualify Bosnia and Herzegovina for the EuroBasket 2025.

In May 2023, Bećiragić also became head coach for Trepça of the Kosovo ProCredit Superliga.

== Personal life ==
During his time playing in Turkey, Bećiragić gained Turkish citizenship under the name Aziz Bekir.

== Honours and awards ==
=== Club achievements ===
- Ülkerspor (1996–2000)
  - Turkish League champion: (1997–98)

=== Coaching honours ===
- Peja (2020–2021)
  - Kosovo Cup winner: (2019–20)
- Ylli (2021–2023)
  - 2× Kosovo League champion: (2020–21, 2021–22)
  - Liga Unike champion: (2020–21)
- Trepça (2023–present)
  - 2× Kosovo League champion: (2023–24, 2024–25)
  - Liga Unike champion: (2023–24)
  - 2× Kosovo Cup winner: (2023–24, 2024–25)
  - 2× Kosovo Supercup winner: (2023, 2024)

=== Individual ===
- Bosnian Coach of the Year: (2025)
