= Kosovo men's national basketball team results (2020–present) =

This is a list of Kosovo men's national basketball team results from 2020 to present.

== Fixtures and results ==
=== 2020 ===
20 February 2023 World Cup pre-qualifiers first round	Kosovo	80–78	Iceland	Pristina, Kosovo
19:00 (UTC+1)	Scoring by quarter: 22–13, 13–21, 25–23, 20–21
	Pts: Berisha 18; Rebs: Hajrizi 8 Asts: Hajrizi 6	Boxscore	Pts: Jónsson 21; Rebs: Hlinason 12; Asts: Vilhjálmsson 6	Arena: Palace of Youth and Sports; Attendance: 2,500; Referees: Ciprian Stoica (ROU), Ivor Matějek (CZE), Mehmet Karabilecen (TUR)

23 February 2023 World Cup pre-qualifiers first round	Luxembourg	80–84	Kosovo	Luxembourg City, Luxembourg
18:00 (UTC+1)	Scoring by quarter: 20–25, 25–19, 20–16, 15–24
	Pts: Rugg 30; Rebs: Rugg 8 Asts: Grün 9	Boxscore	Pts: Hajrizi 25; Rebs: Hajrizi 7 Asts: Berisha 6	Arena: d'Coque; Attendance: 1,600; Referees: Paulo Marques (POR), Ilias Kounelles (CYP), Petr Hruša (CZE)

26 November 2023 World Cup pre-qualifiers first round	Slovakia	91–67	Kosovo	Bratislava, Slovakia
19:00 (UTC+1)	Scoring by quarter: 21–9, 21–20, 20–13, 29–25
	Pts: Brodziansky 26; Rebs: Brodziansky 12; Asts: Ihring 7	Boxscore	Pts: Hajrizi 17; Rebs: Rugova 7 Asts: Hajrizi 6	Arena: Eurovia Aréna; Attendance: 0 (Note: Due to the COVID-19 pandemic, all matches in the November 2020 and February 2021 windows were played behind closed doors in select host cities.); Referees: Ciprian Stoica (ROU), Péter Praksch (HUN), Vasileios Pitsilkas (GRE)

28 November 2023 World Cup pre-qualifiers first round	Iceland	86–62	Kosovo	Bratislava, Slovakia
16:00 (UTC+1)	Scoring by quarter: 21–17, 24–12, 22–14, 19–19
	Pts: Vilhjálmsson 22; Rebs: Hlinason 9 Asts: Guðmundsson 7	Boxscore	Pts: Bunjaku 12; Rebs: Hajrizi, Zenelaj 6 Asts: Bunjaku 4	Arena: Eurovia Aréna; Attendance: 0 Referees: Ciprian Stoica (ROU), Sergiy Chaykovskyy (UKR), Vasileios Pitsilkas (GRE)

=== 2021 ===
18 February 2023 World Cup pre-qualifiers first round	Kosovo	89–99	Luxembourg	Pristina, Kosovo
19:00 (UTC+1)	Scoring by quarter: 23–32, 23–23, 24–20, 19–24
	Pts: Myles 21; Rebs: Hajrizi, Myles 7 Asts: Berisha 6	Boxscore	Pts: Rugg 22; Rebs: Rugg 17; Asts: Melcher 9	Arena: Palace of Youth and Sports; Attendance: 0 Referees: Petros Papapetrou (GRE), Nikolaos Somos (GRE), Sergio Rodríguez (ESP)

20 February 2023 World Cup pre-qualifiers first round	Kosovo	73–77	Slovakia	Pristina, Kosovo
19:00 (UTC+1)	Scoring by quarter: 23–15, 14–20, 17–20, 19–22
	Pts: Berisha 24; Rebs: Hajrizi 9 Asts: Myles 6	Boxscore	Pts: Brodziansky 28; Rebs: Brodziansky 18; Asts: Krajčovič 5	Arena: Palace of Youth and Sports; Attendance: 0 Referees: Petros Papapetrou (GRE), Semen Ovinov (RUS), Ali Şakacı (TUR)

25 November EuroBasket 2025 pre-qualifiers first round	Norway	86–77	Kosovo	Bergen, Norway
19:00 (UTC+1)	Scoring by quarter: 17–22, 25–11, 27–19, 17–25
	Pts: Ndow 21; Rebs: Ndow 8 Asts: Jawara 7	Boxscore	Pts: Berisha 18; Rebs: Berisha 7 Asts: Berisha 4	Arena: Haukelandshallen; Attendance: 2,143; Referees: Vilius Mačiulaitis (LTU), Mart Uuehendrik (EST), James Dominique (GIB)

28 November EuroBasket 2025 pre-qualifiers first round	Kosovo	78–73	Denmark	Pristina, Kosovo
19:00 (UTC+1)	Scoring by quarter: 18–17, 20–16, 22–13, 18–27
	Pts: Berisha 16; Rebs: three players 5 Asts: Berisha 5	Boxscore	Pts: Mortensen 24; Rebs: Midtgaard 10; Asts: three players 4	Arena: Palace of Youth and Sports; Attendance: 550; Referees: Petros Papapetrou (GRE), Ali Şakacı (TUR), Pavel Fúska (SVK)

=== 2022 ===
27 February EuroBasket 2025 pre-qualifiers first round	Kosovo	92–95(OT)	Norway	Mitrovica, Kosovo
19:00 (UTC+1)	Scoring by quarter: 27–15, 19–16, 18–25, 17–25, Overtime: 11–14
	Pts: Berisha 27; Rebs: Bamforth 8 Asts: Bamforth 5	Boxscore	Pts: Frey 38; Rebs: Ndow 10; Asts: Jawara 4	Arena: Minatori Sports Hall; Attendance: 1,500; Referees: Stoica Ciprian (ROU), Zoran Mitrovski (MKD), Stylianos Simeonidis (GRE)

30 June EuroBasket 2025 pre-qualifiers first round	Denmark	105–71	Kosovo	Næstved, Denmark
19:00 (UTC+2)	Scoring by quarter: 26–19, 20–17, 30–17, 29–18
	Pts: Larsen 20; Rebs: Larsen 10; Asts: Mortensen 6	Boxscore	Pts: Berisha, Hajrizi 17; Rebs: Morina, Ukaj 7 Asts: Berisha 7	Arena: Næstved Arena; Attendance: 1,180; Referees: Gintaras Vitkauskas (LTU), Javier Torres Sánchez (ESP), Alexandre Maret (FRA)

=== 2023 ===
19 July EuroBasket 2025 pre-qualifiers third round	Kosovo	76–49	Switzerland	Prizren, Kosovo
20:45 (UTC+2)	Scoring by quarter: 18–16, 23–8, 27–14, 8–11
	Pts: Berisha 20; Rebs: Hajrizi 12; Asts: Artis 6	Boxscore	Pts: Rocak 12; Rebs: Tutonda 7 Asts: Fofana 3	Arena: Sezai Surroi Sports Hall; Attendance: 1,700; Referees: Paulo Marques (POR), Beniamino Attard (ITA), Franko Gracin (CRO)

26 July EuroBasket 2025 pre-qualifiers third round	Denmark	82–75	Kosovo	Næstved, Denmark
18:00 (UTC+2)	Scoring by quarter: 27–16, 17–27, 25–22, 13–10
	Pts: Lundberg 20; Rebs: Dibba 9 Asts: Jukić 7	Boxscore	Pts: Artis 23; Rebs: Berisha, Shoshi 6 Asts: Artis 4	Arena: Næstved Arena; Attendance: 930; Referees: Geert Jacobs (BEL), Sergii Zashchuk (UKR), Javier Torres (ESP)

29 July EuroBasket 2025 pre-qualifiers third round	Switzerland	72–76	Kosovo	Fribourg, Switzerland
17:30 (UTC+2)	Scoring by quarter: 21–20, 18–15, 22–21, 11–20
	Pts: Tutonda 15; Rebs: Fofana 10; Asts: Fofana 7	Boxscore	Pts: Artis 22; Rebs: Hajrizi 8 Asts: Artis 4	Arena: Salle Saint-Lèonard; Attendance: 840; Referees: Gintaras Vitkauskas (LTU), Alexandre Deman (FRA), Valentin Oliot (FRA)

5 August EuroBasket 2025 pre-qualifiers third round	Kosovo	63–88	Denmark	Prizren, Kosovo
20:45 (UTC+2)	Scoring by quarter: 17–24, 11–23, 17–21, 18–20
	Pts: Artis, Janjeva 11; Rebs: Hajrizi 6 Asts: Hajrizi 3	Boxscore	Pts: Lundberg 28; Rebs: Zohore 9 Asts: Lundberg 5	Arena: Sezai Surroi Sports Hall; Attendance: 2,000; Referees: Yener Yılmaz (TUR), Gellért Kapitány (HUN), Mehmet Şahin (TUR)

=== 2024 ===
22 February 2027 World Cup pre-qualifiers first round	Kosovo	83–76	Ireland	Pristina, Kosovo
19:00 (UTC+1)	Scoring by quarter: 22–17, 23–21, 20–19, 18–19
	Pts: Hajrizi 20; Rebs: Hajrizi 9 Asts: Tmušić 6	Boxscore	Pts: Blount 27; Rebs: Blount 13; Asts: Badmus 4	Arena: Palace of Youth and Sports; Attendance: 2,500; Referees: Ali Şakacı (TUR), Jan Baloun (CZE), Edgard Ceccarelli (FRA)

25 February 2027 World Cup pre-qualifiers first round	Azerbaijan	87–77	Kosovo	Baku, Azerbaijan
14:00 (UTC+4)	Scoring by quarter: 19–19, 24–25, 16–16, 28–17
	Pts: Aydın 27; Rebs: Hall 14; Asts: S. Shirzadov 6	Boxscore	Pts: Berisha 20; Rebs: Kapiti 6 Asts: Mala 6	Arena: Sarkhadchi Sport Center; Attendance: 2,400; Referees: Andžej Urbanovič (LTU), Ritvars Helmšteins (LAT), Viktor Nagy (HUN)

21 November 2027 World Cup pre-qualifiers first round	Switzerland	75–43	Kosovo	Bern, Switzerland
19:30 (UTC+1)	Scoring by quarter: 14–12, 22–6, 20–22, 19–3
	Pts: Mbala 15; Rebs: Mbala 12; Asts: Fofana, Kazadi 4	Boxscore	Pts: Tmušić 9 Rebs: Morina 8 Asts: Morina 4	Arena: Mobiliar Arena; Attendance: 585; Referees: Joaquin García (ESP), Łukasz Jankowski (POL), Domen Krajnc (SVN)

24 November 2027 World Cup pre-qualifiers first round	Ireland	91–85	Kosovo	Dublin, Ireland
17:00 (UTC±0)	Scoring by quarter: 24–14, 18–25, 31–21, 18–27
	Pts: Quinn 23; Rebs: Quinn 10; Asts: Blount 8	Boxscore	Pts: Berisha 15; Rebs: Ukaj 8 Asts: Armstead 9	Arena: National Basketball Arena; Attendance: 1,800; Referees: Ritvars Helmšteins (LAT), Martin Van Hoye (BEL), Alexandre Maret (FRA)

=== 2025 ===
20 February 2027 World Cup pre-qualifiers first round	Kosovo	81–79	Azerbaijan	Pristina, Kosovo
19:30 (UTC+1)	Scoring by quarter: 20–21, 23–20, 17–18, 21–20
	Pts: Tmušić 21; Rebs: four players 5 Asts: Myles 6	Boxscore	Pts: Hall 21; Rebs: Hall 16; Asts: K. Mammadov, Turgut 5	Arena: Palace of Youth and Sports; Attendance: 1,000; Referees: Stylianos Simeonidis (GRE), Mehmet Şahin (TUR), Mladen Lučić (MNE)

23 February 2027 World Cup pre-qualifiers first round	Kosovo	73–81	Switzerland	Pristina, Kosovo
19:30 (UTC+1)	Scoring by quarter: 14–23, 16–23, 15–13, 28–22
	Pts: Berisha 20; Rebs: Kapiti 11; Asts: Myles 4	Boxscore	Pts: Ducommun 21; Rebs: Granvorka 10; Asts: George 5	Arena: Palace of Youth and Sports; Attendance: 2,500; Referees: Edgard Ceccarelli (FRA), Polat Parlak (TUR), Jan Baloun (CZE)

30 November EuroBasket 2029 pre-qualifiers first round	Albania	84–99	Kosovo	Shkodër, Albania
18:00 (UTC+1)	Scoring by quarter: 14–25, 14–19, 32–30, 24–25
	Pts: Hamati 19; Rebs: Hamati 10; Asts: Hysa 9	Boxscore	Pts: Berisha 35; Rebs: Kapiti 8 Asts: Armstead 7	Arena: Qazim Dervishi Sports Palace; Attendance: 200; Referees: Mladen Lučić (MNE), Alessandro Perciavalle (ITA), Primož Pipan (SVN)

=== 2026 ===
27 February EuroBasket 2029 pre-qualifiers first round	Kosovo	78–89	Slovakia	Prizren, Kosovo
19:00 (UTC+1)	Scoring by quarter: 27–18, 15–30, 24–26, 12–15
	Pts: Myles 21; Rebs: Shoshi 6 Asts: Myles 5	Boxscore	Pts: DeJulius 26; Rebs: Golian 18; Asts: DeJulius 8	Arena: Sezai Surroi Sports Hall; Attendance: 700; Referees: Ali Şakacı (TUR), Alija Ferevski (MKD), Alin Faur (ROU)

2 July EuroBasket 2029 pre-qualifiers first round	Kosovo	82–89	Albania	Prizren, Kosovo
19:00 (UTC+2)	Scoring by quarter: 23–23, 25–24, 17–22, 17–20
	Pts: Berisha 28; Rebs: Hajrizi 15; Asts: Myles 4	Boxscore	Pts: Tyree 25; Rebs: Gaxho 9 Asts: Tyree 8	Arena: Sezai Surroi Sports Hall; Attendance: 700; Referees: Ciprian Stoica (ROU), Landy Pierre (FRA), Diogo Martins (POR)

5 July EuroBasket 2029 pre-qualifiers first round	Slovakia	86–83	Kosovo	Spišská Nová Ves, Slovakia
18:00 (UTC+2)	Scoring by quarter: 33–22, 17–20, 20–21, 16–20
	Pts: Hronský 20; Rebs: Brodziansky 11; Asts: Hlivák 8	Boxscore	Pts: Hajrizi 20; Rebs: Shoshi 13; Asts: Hajrizi, Myles 4	Arena: Spiš Aréna; Attendance: 3,509; Referees: Viktor Nagy (HUN), Gabrielius Simonavičius (LTU), Martin Van Howe (BEL)
