= Valentin Spaqi =

Kosovan basketball player and coach

KEKU

Personal information
- Born: 6 September 1979 (age 47) Prizren, Yugoslavia
- Listed height: 6 ft 6 in (1.98 m)

Career information
- Playing career: 1995–2014
- Coaching career: 2015–present

Career history

Playing
- 1995–1997: Bashkimi
- 1997–1999: Hiron Botinec
- 1999–2002: Bashkimi
- 2002–2006: Mabetex
- 2006–2007: AS Prishtina
- 2007–2012: Prishtina
- 2012–2014: Bashkimi

Coaching
- 2015: Besa
- 2015–2016: Rahoveci
- 2018–2023: AS Prishtina
- 2023–2024: Kosovo-U16
- 2025–present: KEKU

Career highlights
- As player: 5× Kosovo League champion (2005, 2008–2011); 4x Kosovo Cup winner (2000, 2008–2010); Kosovo Supercup winner (2012); As head coach: Kosovo First League champion (2016)

Valentin Spaqi (born 6 September 1979) is a Kosovan professional basketball head coach and a former basketball player.

== Coaching career ==
In 2015, he started his coaching career when he became the head coach of Besa. Then he signed for Rahoveci and promoted them to the Kosovo Superleague.
