= Arti Hajdari =

Kosovan basketball player

No. 1 – Peja
- Position: Shooting guard
- League: Kosovo Superleague

Personal information
- Born: 12 May 1993 (age 33) Peja, FR Yugoslavia
- Listed height: 1.87 m (6 ft 2 in)
- Listed weight: 88 kg (194 lb)

Career information
- NBA draft: 2015: undrafted
- Playing career: 2012–present

Career history
- 2012–2014: Besa
- 2014–2018: Peja
- 2018: Rahoveci
- 2018–2019: Peja
- 2019–2020: Feronikeli
- 2020–2022: Prizreni
- 2022–2023: Peja
- 2023: Prishtina
- 2023: Teuta
- 2023–2024: Prizreni
- 2024–present: Peja

Career highlights
- Kosovo Superleague champion (2023); 2xKosovo Cup winner (2011, 2015); Kosovo Supercup winner (2021); Kosovo First League champion (2013)

Arti Hajdari (born 12 May 1993) is a Kosovan professional basketball player for Peja of the Kosovo Superleague. He is part of the Kosovo national team.
