= Erjon Kastrati =

Kosovan basketball player

No. 28 – Golden Eagle Ylli
- Position: Small forward / shooting guard
- League: Kosovo Superleague

Personal information
- Born: December 30, 1994 (age 31) Pristina, Kosovo, FR Yugoslavia
- Listed height: 1.98 m (6 ft 6 in)
- Listed weight: 91 kg (201 lb)

Career information
- NBA draft: 2016: undrafted
- Playing career: 2011–present

Career history
- 2011–2012: Union Olimpija
- 2011–2012: → LTH Castings Mercator
- 2012–2017: Krka
- 2017–2019: Union/Petrol Olimpija
- 2019–2020: Egis Körmend
- 2020: Koper Primorska
- 2021–2022: Ylli
- 2022–2025: Trepça
- 2025–present: Ylli

Career highlights
- 3× Slovenian League champion (2013, 2014, 2018); 3× Slovenian Cup winner (2014–2016); 3x Liga Unike champion (2021, 2024, 2026); 4× Kosovo Superleague winner (2021, 2022, 2024, 2025); Superleague MVP (2021); 3x Kosovo Cup winner (2023, 2024, 2025); 2x Kosovo Supercup winner (2023, 2024)

Erjon Kastrati (born 30 December 1994) is a Kosovan professional basketball player for Golden Eagle Ylli of the Kosovo Basketball Superleague. He is a 1.98 m tall shooting guard and small forward. Kastrati and his friend Gëzim Morina helped Ylli to win Liga Unike and the Kosovo Basketball Superleague for the first time in the club's history.

== Professional career ==
=== Ylli ===
On 5 January 2021, Kastrati signed for Ylli of the Kosovo Basketball Superleague. There, he won the Kosovo Superleague in 2021 and 2022. He was selected the MVP of the 2021 Kosovo Superleague season. Kastrati parted ways with Ylli on 23 June 2022 being one of the best players the club ever had.

=== Trepça ===
On 23 June 2022, Kastrati signed a three-year contract for Trepça of the Kosovo Superleague.

=== Return to Ylli ===
On 14 July 2025, he returned to Ylli of the Kosovo Basketball Superleague.

== National team career ==
=== Kosovo ===
On 21 June 2017, Erolld Belegu, the president of Basketball Federation of Kosovo confirmed that Kastrati together with Gezim Morina will be part of Kosovo.

== Honours ==
Slovenian League

- Winners (3): 2012–13, 2013–14, 2017-18

Slovenian Cup

- Winners (3): 2014, 2015, 2016

Slovenian Supercup

- Winners (2): 2014, 2016

Kosovo Superleague

- Winners (4): 2021, 2022, 2024, 2025

Kosovo Cup

- Winners (3): 2023, 2024, 2025

Kosovo Supercup

- Winners (2): 2023, 2024

Liga Unike:

- Winners (3): 2021, 2024, 2026

Liga Unike Supercup

- Winners (2): 2021, 2022
