= 2023–24 Kosovo Basketball Superleague =

- Duration: 22 September 2023 – 23 May 2024
- Games played: 224 (regular season); 9–15 (Playoffs)
- Teams: 8
- TV partners: K-Sport; Art Sport

Regular season
- Season MVP: (Kosovo) Drilon Hajrizi (Trepça)
- Relegated: Istogu

Finals
- Champions: Trepça
- Runners-up: Ylli
- Finals MVP: (United States) Darnell Edge (Trepça)

Statistical leaders
Points	(United States) Alonzo Verge Jr. (Golden Eagle Ylli)	24.2
Rebounds	(Canada) Jordy Tshimanga (Trepça)	10.0

Records
- Highest scoring: Trepça 140-48 Istogu

The 2023–24 Kosovo Basketball Superleague, also known as Prince Caffe Superliga, is the 30th season of the Kosovo Basketball Superleague. The season started on 22 September 2023 and ended on 23 May 2024.

== Teams ==
Istogu has been promoted to the league after winning 2022–23 Kosovo Basketball First League.

== Venues and location ==
Kosovo Basketball Superleague – club locations

Team	City	Venue	Capacity
Bashkimi	Prizren	"Sezai Surroi" Spor Merkezi	2,500
Prishtina	Pristina	Pallati i Rinisë dhe Sporteve	1,800
Peja	Peja	Karagaq Sports Hall	3,000
Trepça	Mitrovica	Salla e sporteve Minatori	3,000
Golden Eagle Ylli	Suva Reka	Salla e sporteve "13 Qërshori"	1,800
Istogu	Istog	Palestra Sportive Istog	2,000
Proton Cable Prizreni	Prizren	"Sezai Surroi" Spor Merkezi	2,500
Vëllaznimi	Gjakova	Palestra Sportive "Shani Nushi"	2,500

== Regular season ==
Pos	Team	Pld	W	L	PF	PA	PD	Pts	Qualification or relegation
1	Trepça	28	25	3	2526	2047	+479	53	Qualification to playoffs
2	Peja	28	19	9	2482	2222	+260	47	Qualification to playoffs
3	Golden Eagle Ylli	28	19	9	2330	2060	+270	47	Qualification to playoffs
4	Sigal Prishtina	28	16	12	2437	2283	+154	44	Qualification to playoffs
5	Vëllaznimi	28	13	15	2256	2240	+16	41	Qualification to playoffs
6	Bashkimi Prizren	28	11	17	2313	2280	+33	39	Qualification to playoffs
7	Proton Cable Prizreni	28	8	20	2287	2562	−275	36	Qualification for relegation playoffs
8	Istogu	28	1	27	1904	2841	−937	29	Relegation to Liga e Parë

Source: Kosovo Basketball Federation, Top Sporti

== Playoffs ==
The quarter-finals and finals were played in a best-of-three playoff format.
The semi-finals and finals were played in a best-of-five playoff format. The higher seeded teams played game one, three and five (if necessary) at home.

=== Bracket ===
Quarter-finals
Prishtina	2
Vëllaznimi	1
Golden Eagle Ylli	2
Bashkimi	0

Semi-finals
Trepça	3
Prishtina	0
Golden Eagle Ylli	3
Peja	2

Finals
Trepça	3
Golden Eagle Ylli	2

=== Quarter-finals ===
Team 1	Series	Team 2	Game 1	Game 2	Game 3
Golden Eagle Ylli	2–0	Bashkimi	87–69	86–75	
Prishtina	2–1	Vëllaznimi	72–64	65–66	83–73

=== Semi-finals ===
Team 1	Series	Team 2	Game 1	Game 2	Game 3	Game 4	Game 5
Trepça	3–0	Prishtina	87–81	86–85	82–69		
Golden Eagle Ylli	3–2	Peja	87–84	92–86	86–98	80–81	88–84

=== Finals ===
Team 1	Series	Team 2	Game 1	Game 2	Game 3	Game 4	Game 5
Trepça	3–2	Golden Eagle Ylli	77–68	79–80	85–78	71–76	67–66

== Play-out ==
Proton Cable Prizreni defeated New Basket in the play-out.

== Kosovan clubs in European competitions ==
Team	Competition	Progress
Peja	Champions League	First qualifying round
Peja	FIBA Europe Cup	Regular season
Trepça	FIBA Europe Cup	Qualifiers
