= 2012–13 Kosovo Basketball Superleague =

2012-13 BKT Superliga
- Duration: September 30, 2014 – April 29, 2015
- Games played: 224 regual season
- Teams: 8

Regular season
- Top seed: KB Peja
- Season MVP: (Kosovo) Dardan Berisha
- Promoted: KB Besa
- Relegated: KB Kosova Vushtrri

Finals
- Champions: KB Peja; 6th title
- Runners-up: Sigal Prishtina
- Finals MVP: (Kosovo) Dardan Berisha

Awards
- Defender o/t Year: (Albania) Gerti Shima

Records
- Average attendance: = 450

The 2012–13 BKT Superliga was the 19th season of the Kosovo Basketball Superleague, also called BKT Superliga in its sponsored identity it's the highest professional basketball league in Kosovo.

The regular season started on 12 October 2012 and finished on 29 April 2013, after all teams had played 28 games. The 4 best ranked teams advanced to the play-off phase whilst KB Kosova Vushtrri was relegated to the Liga e Parë e Kosoves ne Baskbetboll after finishing last in the league table.

The play-offs started on 1 May 2015 and finished on 14 May 2015, KB Peja won their 6th title by beating Sigal Prishtina 3:0 in a 3-game final.

== Regular season ==
Pos	Team	W	L	PCT	GP	Qualification or relegation
1	KB Peja	25	3	.893	28	
2	Sigal Prishtina	22	6	.786	28	
3	KB Bashkimi	20	8	.714	28	
4	KB RTV21	16	12	.571	28	
5	KB Trepça	16	12	.571	28	
6	KB Drita	7	21	.250	28	
7	KB Vëllaznimi	6	22	.214	28	
8	KB Kosova Vushtrri	1	27	.036	28	

== Playoffs ==
Same as last year, the semi-finals were played in a best-of-four format.

Semifinals
1	KB Peja	2
4	KB RTV21	0
2	Sigal Prishtina	2
3	KB Bashkimi	1

Finals
1	KB Peja	3
2	Sigal Prishtina	0

2012–13 BKT Superliga Champions

KB Peja
6th title

== Awards ==
- MVP: (Kosovo) Dardan Berisha – KB Peja
- Finals MVP: (Kosovo) Dardan Berisha – KB Peja
- Foreigner MVP: (United States) Adam Waleskowski – Sigal Prishtina
- Coach of the Year: (Croatia) Rudolf Jugo – KB Peja
