= 2024–25 Kosovo Basketball Superleague =

- Duration: 14 September 2024 – 21 May 2025
- Games played: 224 (regular season); 9–15 (Playoffs)
- Teams: 8
- TV partners: K-Sport; Art Sport

Finals
- Champions: Trepça
- Runners-up: Bashkimi
- Finals MVP: (United States) Mike Myers (Trepça)

Statistical leaders
Points	(United States) Jericole Hellems (Vëllaznimi)	20.8
Rebounds	(United States) Jayveous Mckinnis (Bashkimi)	9.3
Assists	(United States) Malik Johnson (Trepça)	7.4

The 2024–25 Kosovo Basketball Superleague, also known as ProCredit Superliga, is the 31st season of the Kosovo Basketball Superleague. The season started on 14 September 2024 and ended on 21 May 2025.

== Teams ==
Bora has been promoted to the league after winning 2023–24 Kosovo Basketball First League.

== Venues and location ==
Kosovo Basketball Superleague – club locations

Team	City	Venue	Capacity
Bashkimi	Prizren	"Sezai Surroi" Spor Merkezi	2,500
Bora	Pristina	Pallati i Rinisë dhe Sporteve	1,800
Prishtina	Pristina	Pallati i Rinisë dhe Sporteve	1,800
Peja	Peja	Karagaq Sports Hall	3,000
Trepça	Mitrovica	Salla e sporteve Minatori	3,000
Golden Eagle Ylli	Suva Reka	Salla e sporteve "13 Qërshori"	1,800
Proton Cable Prizreni	Prizren	"Sezai Surroi" Spor Merkezi	2,500
Vëllaznimi	Gjakova	Palestra Sportive "Shani Nushi"	2,500

== Regular season ==
Pos	Team	Pld	W	L	PF	PA	PD	Pts	Qualification or relegation
1	Bashkimi	28	20	8	2238	2058	+180	48	Qualification to playoffs
2	Trepça	28	19	9	2283	2050	+233	47	Qualification to playoffs
3	Prishtina	28	17	11	2315	2312	+3	45	Qualification to playoffs
4	Golden Eagle Ylli	28	15	13	2138	2146	−8	43	Qualification to playoffs
5	Peja	28	14	14	2183	2112	+71	42	Qualification to playoffs
6	Vëllaznimi	28	13	15	2118	2135	−17	41	Qualification to playoffs
7	Bora	28	9	19	2213	2303	−90	37	Qualification for relegation playoffs
8	Proton Cable Prizreni	28	5	23	2232	2604	−372	33	Relegation to Liga e Parë

Source: Kosovo Basketball Federation,Top Sporti

== Playoffs ==
The quarter-finals were played in a best-of-three playoff format.
The semi-finals were played in a best-of-five playoff format. The higher seeded teams played game one, three and five (if necessary) at home.
The finals were played in a best-of-seven playoff format. The higher seeded teams played game one, three, five and seven (if necessary) at home.

=== Bracket ===
Quarter-finals
Golden Eagle Ylli	1
Peja	2
Prishtina	2
Vëllaznimi	1

Semi-finals
Bashkimi	3
Peja	1
Trepça	3
Prishtina	1

Finals
Bashkimi	2
Trepça	4

=== Quarter-finals ===
Team 1	Series	Team 2	Game 1	Game 2	Game 3
Golden Eagle Ylli	1–2	Peja	71–77	75–66	79–84
Prishtina	2–1	Vëllaznimi	71–69	73–90	86–82

=== Semi-finals ===
Team 1	Series	Team 2	Game 1	Game 2	Game 3	Game 4	Game 5
Bashkimi	3–1	Peja	81–61	79–84	84–78	84–78	
Trepça	3–1	Prishtina	80–65	83–90	67–61	84–80	

=== Finals ===
Team 1	Series	Team 2	Game 1	Game 2	Game 3	Game 4	Game 5	Game 6	Game 7
Bashkimi	2–4	Trepça	84–77	72–79	71–88	74–80	85–77	67–82	

== Play-out ==
Bora defeated KEKU in the play-out.

== Kosovan clubs in European competitions ==
Team	Competition	Progress
Trepça	Champions League	Qualifying round
Trepça	FIBA Europe Cup	Regular season
Peja	FIBA Europe Cup	Qualifiers
