= Drilon Hajrizi =

Kosovan basketball player

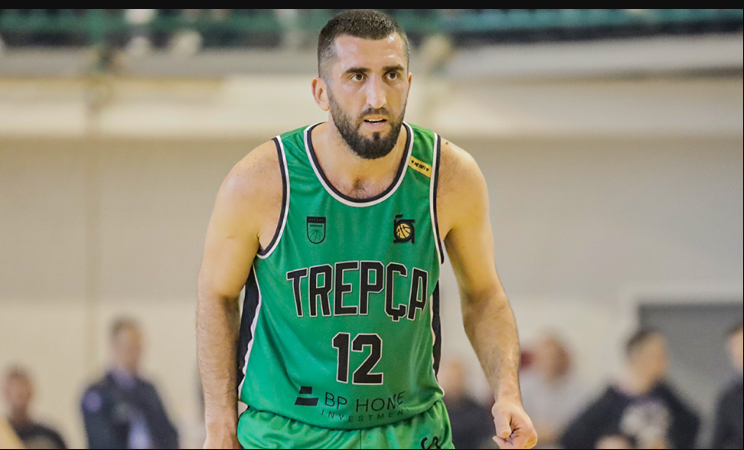
- Hajrizi in 2023

No. 12 – Trepça
- Position: Power forward
- League: Kosovo Basketball Superleague; Liga Unike

Personal information
- Born: 17 January 1991 (age 35) Mitrovicë, Kosovo, Yugoslavia
- Listed height: 2.03 m (6 ft 8 in)
- Listed weight: 108 kg (238 lb)

Career information
- NBA draft: 2013: undrafted

Career history
- 2008–2013: Trepça
- 2013–2016: Peja
- 2016–2017: Sigal Prishtina
- 2018–2019: Kanazawa Samuraiz
- 2019: Bashkimi Prizren
- 2019–2020: Peja
- 2020–present: Trepça

Career highlights
- 5× Kosovo League champion (2012, 2017, 2024, 2025, 2026); 4× Kosovo League MVP (2012, 2016, 2022, 2024); 9× Kosovo Cup winner (2012, 2015, 2017, 2020, 2022, 2023, 2024, 2025, 2026); 5× Kosovo Cup MVP (2012, 2017, 2022, 2023, 2024); Liga Unike champion (2024)

Drilon Hajrizi (born 17 January 1991) is a Kosovan professional basketball player for Trepça of the Kosovo Basketball Superleague and Liga Unike.

== Professional career ==
=== Kanazawa Samuraiz ===
On 3 January 2018, Hajrizi joined B.League side Kanazawa Samuraiz, on a six-month contract. On 17 January 2018, Kanazawa Samuraiz announced the transfer of Hajrizi via a status on their official Facebook account.

=== Bashkimi Prizren ===
On 28 January 2019, Hajrizi joined Kosovo Basketball Superleague side Bashkimi Prizren. On 2 February 2019, he in his debut scored 14 points, 13 rebounds and 5 assists completing the game with double-double in a 75–83 home defeat against Ponte Prizreni.

=== Return to Peja ===
On 11 September 2019, Hajrizi returned to Kosovo Basketball Superleague club Peja.

=== Return to Trepça ===
On 3 January 2021, Hajrizi signed for KB Trepça of the Kosovo Basketball Superleague.

== International career ==
Hajrizi was one of the first players of Kosovo and his official debut with Kosovo came on 31 August 2016 in the EuroBasket 2017 qualification match against Slovenia.

== Controversial transfers ==
=== Prishtina (2016) ===
After Hajrizi transferred to Prishtina, he and the club faced massive criticism from the supporter's group Plisat, who were against the former Trepça player. As a result, Plisat demanded a resignation from the board members.

=== Undesirable return to Trepça ===
In January 2021, Torcida Mitrovicë, the Trepça supporters who share a fierce rivalry with Prishtina, announced that they oppose the return of Hajrizi. On June 12, 2024, Trepça announced Hajrizi as the new captain of the squad which immediately was criticized by Torcida, who declared they would boycott KB Trepça's games due to the decision.

== Awards and accomplishments ==
Prishtina

- Kosovo Basketball Superleague: (2017)
- Kosovo Cup: (2017)

Peja

- 2× Kosovo Cup: (2015, 2020)
- Kosovo Supercup: (2015)

Trepça

- 4× Kosovo Basketball Superleague: (2012, 2024, 2025, 2026)
- 6× Kosovo Cup: (2012, 2022, 2023, 2024, 2025, 2026)
- Liga Unike champion (2024)

Individual awards

- 4× Kosovo League MVP (2012, 2016, 2022, 2024)
- 5× Kosovo Cup MVP (2012, 2017, 2022, 2023, 2024)
