= 2021–22 Kosovo Basketball Superleague =

- Duration: 14 September 2021 – 2 June 2022
- Games played: 224 (regular season); 9–15 (Playoffs)
- Teams: 8
- TV partners: K-Sport; Art Sport

Regular season
- Relegated: Drita

Finals
- Champions: Golden Eagle Ylli (2nd title)
- Runners-up: Trepça
- Finals MVP: (Kosovo) (Montenegro) Mikaile Tmusiq

Statistical leaders
Points	(United States) Courtney Fells	22.2
Rebounds	(Kosovo) Urim Zenelaj	10.4
Assists	(Montenegro) Ivan Koljević	8.2

The 2021–22 Kosovo Basketball SuperLeague was the 28th season of the Kosovo Basketball Superleague. The season started on 14 September 2021 and ended on 2 June 2022. Ylli won its second title.

== Teams ==
Drita has been promoted to the league after winning 2021–22 Kosovo Basketball First League. Drita finished in the last place and relegated not being able to win one game.

== Venues and locations ==
Kosovo Basketball Superleague – club locations

Teams that play in the Balkan International Basketball League

Team	City	Venue	Capacity
Bashkimi	Prizren	Palestra Sportive Sezair Surroi	2,500
Drita◆	Gjilan	Palestra Petrit Selishta	2,500
Peja	Peja	Karagaq Sports Hall	2,500
Rahoveci	Rahovec	Salla e Sporteve Rahovec	1,500
Sigal Prishtina	Pristina	Pallati i Rinisë dhe Sporteve	2,500
Trepça	Mitrovica	Salla e sporteve Minatori	3,000
Ylli	Suva Reka	Salla e sporteve "13 Qërshori"	1,800

Notes

◆ Promoted from the 2020–21 Kosovo Basketball First League.

== Regular season ==
Pos	Team	Pld	W	L	PF	PA	PD	Pts	Qualification or relegation
1	Golden Eagle Ylli	28	22	6	2345	2019	+326	50	Qualification to playoffs
2	Trepça	28	19	9	2406	2125	+281	47	Qualification to playoffs
3	Peja	28	18	10	2550	2197	+353	46	Qualification to playoffs
4	Prizreni	28	15	13	2452	2441	+11	43	Qualification to playoffs
5	Sigal Prishtina	28	15	13	2484	2234	+250	43	Qualification to playoffs
6	Bashkimi Prizren	28	12	16	2216	2169	+47	40	Qualification to playoffs
7	Rahoveci	28	11	17	2346	2387	−41	39	Qualification for relegation playoffs
8	Drita	28	0	28	1884	3111	−1227	28	Relegation to Liga e Parë

Source: Kosovo Basketball Federation, Top Sporti

== Playoffs ==
The quarter-finals and finals were played in a best-of-three playoff format.
The semi-finals and finals were played in a best-of-five playoff format. The higher seeded teams played game one, three and five (if necessary) at home.

Semi-finals
1Golden Eagle Ylli	73	79	75
5Sigal Prishtina	48	70	56
2Trepça	75	107	66	81
3Peja	68	105	72	76

Final
1Golden Eagle Ylli	63	60	55	70
2Trepça	62	46	58	64

== Play-out ==
Rahoveci defeated Prishtina e Re in the play-out. In the second game Musab Mala completed a triple-double(32 points, 10 rebounds, 15 assists).
