= Azemi =

Azemi is a surname. Notable people with the surname include:

- Hafëz Jusuf Azemi (1920–2023), Albanian anti-communist
- Nijazi Azemi (1970–2001), Liberation Army of Preševo, Medveđa and Bujanovac commander
- Edmond Azemi (born 1980), Kosovan basketball player
- Mohammad Al-Azemi (born 1982), Kuwaiti middle-distance runner
- Ilir Azemi (born 1992), Kosovar Albanian footballer
- Fitim Azemi (born 1992), Norwegian Albanian footballer
- Faisal Ajab Al-Azemi (born 1993), Kuwaiti footballer
- Arian Azemi (born 1999), Kosovan basketball player
