= Dardan Kapiti =

Kosovan basketball player

No. 35 – Trepça
- Position: Center / power forward
- League: Kosovo Basketball Superleague; Liga Unike; FEC

Personal information
- Born: March 22, 2000 (age 26) Pristina, Kosovo under UN administration
- Listed height: 2.05 m (6 ft 9 in)
- Listed weight: 100 kg (220 lb)

Career information
- College: Florida Atlantic (2019–2022); Eastern Kentucky (2022–2023)
- NBA draft: 2023: undrafted
- Playing career: 2016–present

Career history
- 2016–2017: Kerasan
- 2023–present: Trepça

Career highlights
- 3x Kosovo Superleague champion (2024, 2025, 2026); Kosovo Superleague Finals MVP (2026); Liga Unike champion (2024); 3x Kosovo Cup winner (2024, 2025, 2026); 2x Kosovo Supercup winner (2023, 2024)
Medals
Men's basketball
Representing Kosovo
2018 FIBA U18 European Championship Division C
Gold medal – first place	2018 Kosovo	Under-18

Dardan Kapiti (born March 22, 2000) is a Kosovan professional basketball player for Trepça of the Kosovo Basketball Superleague. He is a member of the Kosovo national team.

== Youth and college career ==
Kapiti started playing basketball with the youth team of Kerasan Pristina. In August 2017, he signed for the Dutch youth team of Apollo Amsterdam. Kapiti later became part of the college teams Florida Atlantic Owls and Eastern Kentucky.

== Professional career ==
=== Kerasan (2016–2017) ===
Kapiti made his professional debut at the age of 16 in the 2016–17 Superleague season where he averaged 7.08 points in 13 games.

=== Trepça (2023–present) ===
On August 6, 2023, Kapiti signed for Trepça of the Kosovo Superleague. In the 2024-25 Champions League qualifiers, he averaged 10.0 points, 7.0 rebounds and 1.0 assist in two games against Kervanos and Nymburk.

== National team career ==
Kapiti played for Kosovo's under-16, under-18 and under-20 team.

Kapiti debuted for the Kosovo national team on 28 June 2018 against Hungary in the 2019 World Cup qualification.
