= Enes Hadžibulić =

Macedonian basketball player

Personal information
- Born: December 13, 1981 (age 44) Macedonia
- Listed height: 1.97 m (6 ft 6 in)

Career information
- Playing career: 1997–2014
- Position: Guard
- Number: 7,4

Career history
- 2001–2002: MZT Skopje Aerodrom
- 2002–2004: Dukagjini
- 2004: Vëllaznimi
- 2004: Kastrioti Ferizaj
- 2004–2005: Sigal Prishtina
- 2005–2006: Dukagjini
- 2006–2007: Vardar Osiguruvanje
- 2007–2008: Dinamo București
- 2008–2009: CSU Brașov
- 2009–2010: Rabotnički
- 2010: Bashkimi Prizren
- 2010: Peja
- 2010–2011: Rabotnički
- 2012–2013: Lirija
- 2013–2014: Feni Industries
- 2014–2015: Kastrioti Ferizaj

Career highlights
- Macedonian Cup - 2007, 2011

Enes Hadžibulić (Albanian: Enes Haxhibuliq; born December 13, 1981) is a former Macedonian professional basketball Guard. He has been a former sports director at Rabotnicki in season 2018/2019
