= KB Istogu =

Professional basketball club in Kosovo

- Nickname: Djemtë e Bjeshkës (Sons of the Mountains)
- Leagues: Kosovo Basketball First League
- Founded: 1970; 55 years ago
- Arena: Palestra Sportive në Istog
- Capacity: 1,500
- Location: Burim, Kosovo
- Team colors: Crimson and black
- Head coach: Fikret Shatri

KB Istogu is a professional basketball club based in Burim, Kosovo. The club currently plays in the Kosovo Basketball First League.

Ardit Pepaj and Shendrit Llapi, who play for the Kosovo national team, are both former senior and academy players of Istogu.

== History ==
KB Istogu was founded in 1970. In 2023, Istogu promoted to the Kosovo Superleague for the first time in their history after winning the Kosovo First League. Istogu recorded their first win in the Superleague against Bashkimi with the result 83–77. However, Istogu relegated in the same season finishing in the last place.

== Arena ==
The club currently plays in the Palestra Sportive e Istogut, with a capacity for around 1500 spectators.

== Honours ==
- Kosovo First League (1): 2022–2023
- Kosovo Second League (1): 2017–2018

== Notable players ==
- (Belgium) Mirza Shkreli
- (Kosovo) Nderim Januzaj
- (Kosovo) Shendrit Llapi
- (Kosovo) Ardit Pepaj
- (Kosovo) Diamant Shabani
- (Kosovo) Fikret Shatri
- (Kosovo) (North Macedonia) Fis Juniku
- (Kosovo) (United States) Arian Azemi
