= Venson Hamilton =

American basketball player (born 1977)

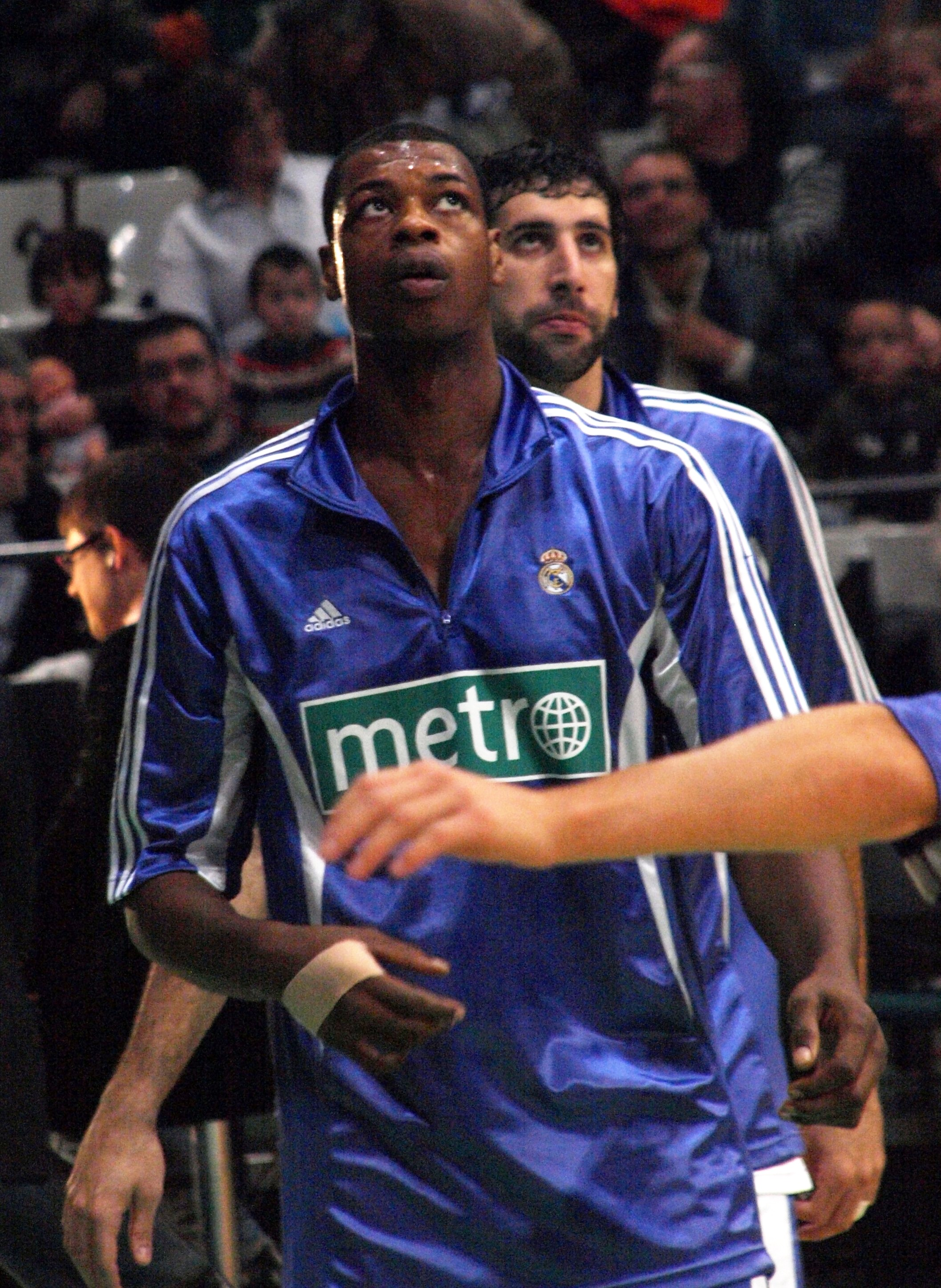

Personal information
- Born: August 11, 1977 (age 49) Forest City, North Carolina, U.S.
- Listed height: 6 ft 9.5 in (2.07 m)
- Listed weight: 255 lb (116 kg)

Career information
- High school: East Rutherford (Forest City, North Carolina)
- College: Nebraska (1995–1999)
- NBA draft: 1999: 2nd round, 50th overall pick
- Drafted by: Houston Rockets
- Playing career: 1999–2014
- Position: Center
- Number: 4

Career history
- 1999–2000: Basket Napoli
- 2000–2001: Prokom Trefl Sopot
- 2001: Virtus Ragusa
- 2001–2002: Basket Club Ferrara
- 2002–2003: Tenerife
- 2003–2004: Bilbao Basket
- 2004–2005: DKV Joventut
- 2005–2009: Real Madrid
- 2011: Gran Canaria
- 2014: Besa
- 2014: RSB Berkane

Career highlights
- ULEB Cup champion (2007); Spanish League champion (2007); Big 12 Player of the Year (1999)
- Stats at Basketball Reference

Shad Venson Hamilton (born August 11, 1977) is an American former professional basketball player.

== College career ==
A graduate of East Rutherford High School in Forest City, North Carolina, Hamilton played college basketball at the University of Nebraska–Lincoln, where he played with the Nebraska Cornhuskers men's basketball team. He holds school records for most blocked shots (241), and most rebounds (1,080), surpassing the previous record by nearly 300. He ranks ninth on the school's all-time scoring chart with 1,416 career points. He shot 52.7% from the field throughout his career. He also dished out 164 assists, and compiled 186 steals in his college career.

He was named the Big 12 Player of the Year during his senior season of college. His 335 rebounds during his senior season set a new school record for rebounds in a single season. He was also named to the Big 12 conference's All-Defensive Team.

== Professional career ==
Hamilton was selected with the 50th overall draft pick by the Houston Rockets in the 1999 NBA draft. In the 1999–00 season, he played with Basket Napoli of Italy. In November 2000, he signed with Prokom Trefl Sopot of Poland. In January 2001, he was released by Prokom, and the next month he returned to Italy and signed with Virtus Ragusa for the rest of the season. For the 2001–02 season, he moved to Basket Club Ferrara. For the 2002–03 season, he moved to Spain and signed with Tenerife of the LEB Oro. The next season he also played in LEB Oro but moved to Bilbao Basket. For the 2004–05 season, he moved to the Spanish ACB League club DKV Joventut. From 2005 to 2009 he played with Real Madrid. With Real he was the Spanish champion and ULEB Cup winner in 2007. In 2011, he played only game with Gran Canaria. In 2014, he played with KB Besa of Kosovo and his last club was RSB Berkane of Morocco.
