= Jalen Tate =

American basketball player

No. 2 – CB Tizona
- Position: Point guard / shooting guard
- League: Primera FEB

Personal information
- Born: June 18, 1998 (age 28) Toledo, Ohio, U.S.
- Listed height: 6 ft 6 in (1.98 m)
- Listed weight: 175 lb (79 kg)

Career information
- High school: Pickerington Central (Pickerington, Ohio)
- College: Northern Kentucky (2016–2020); Arkansas (2020–2021)
- NBA draft: 2021: undrafted
- Playing career: 2021–present

Career history
- 2021: Niagara River Lions
- 2021: Gießen 46ers
- 2022: Ostioneros de Guaymas
- 2022–2023: Peja
- 2023–2024: Leuven Bears
- 2024–2025: AB Castelló
- 2025: Maccabi Ma'ale Adumim
- 2025–2026: Gipuzkoa Basket
- 2026–present: CB Tizona

Career highlights
- Kosovo Superleague champion (2023); Kosovo Superleague Finals MVP (2023); Third-team All-Horizon League (2020); Horizon League Defensive Player of the Year (2020); 3× Horizon League All-Defensive Team (2018–2020); Horizon League All-Freshman Team (2018); Horizon League tournament MVP (2020)

Jalen Tate (born June 18, 1998) is an American professional basketball player for CB Tizona of the Spanish Primera FEB. He played college basketball for the Northern Kentucky Norse and the Arkansas Razorbacks.

== High school career ==
Tate attended Pickerington High School Central in Pickerington, Ohio. He helped his team win three district titles and was a two-time All-Ohio Capital Conference selection. In his senior season, Tate averaged 17.2 points, 6.7 rebounds, 3.7 assists and 2.1 steals per game.

== College career ==
Eight games into his career at Northern Kentucky, Tate suffered a season-ending injury, breaking the metacarpal bone in his left hand against Norfolk State. He was granted a medical redshirt. As a freshman, Tate averaged 5.7 points, 2.3 rebounds and two assists per game, earning Horizon League All-Freshman Team and All-Defensive Team honors. He averaged 13.7 points, 4.4 rebounds and 4.1 assists per game as a sophomore and repeated on the Horizon League All-Defensive Team. On February 14, 2020, Tate posted a career-high 31 points, seven assists, six rebounds and six steals in an 84–70 win over IUPUI. In his junior season, he averaged 13.9 points, 5.4 rebounds, 3.6 assists and 1.9 steals per game. Tate earned Third Team All-Horizon League honors and was named Horizon League Defensive Player of the Year. He led Northern Kentucky to its second straight Horizon League tournament title and was named tournament MVP. For his senior season, Tate moved to Arkansas as a graduate transfer. The Razorbacks finished in the elite eight.

== Professional career ==
On October 9, 2021, Tate signed with Gießen 46ers of the Basketball Bundesliga.

In December 2025, he signed for Gipuzkoa Basket of the Primera FEB.

== Career statistics ==
Legend
GP	Games played	GS	Games started	MPG	Minutes per game
FG%	Field goal percentage	3P%	3-point field goal percentage	FT%	Free throw percentage
RPG	Rebounds per game	APG	Assists per game	SPG	Steals per game
BPG	Blocks per game	PPG	Points per game	**Bold**	Career high

=== College ===
Year	Team	GP	GS	MPG	FG%	3P%	FT%	RPG	APG	SPG	BPG	PPG
2016–17	Northern Kentucky	8	8	18.8	.412	.100	.333	2.0	1.6	.9	.3	4.6
2017–18	Northern Kentucky	**32**	**32**	22.9	.470	.214	.636	2.3	2.0	1.4	.6	5.7
2018–19	Northern Kentucky	31	23	27.0	**.539**	**.407**	.610	4.4	**4.1**	1.2	**.7**	13.7
2019–20	Northern Kentucky	22	20	**30.2**	.485	.182	.676	**5.4**	3.6	**1.9**	.5	**13.9**
2020–21	Arkansas	**32**	**32**	29.5	.485	.342	**.713**	3.8	3.8	1.1	.4	11.0
Career		125	115	26.6	.496	.300	.637	3.7	3.3	1.3	.5	10.4

== Personal life ==
Tate's father, Jermaine, played college basketball for Ohio State and Cincinnati before embarking on a 13-year professional career. His older brother, Jae'Sean, also competed for Ohio State and plays in the NBA for the Houston Rockets, while his sister, Jada, plays college basketball for Tiffin.
