= Bledar Gjeçaj =

Albanian basketball player and coach (born 1970)

Bashkimi
- Position: Assistant coach

Personal information
- Born: 4 March 1970 (age 56) Shkodër, Albania

Career information
- Playing career: 1989–2008
- Coaching career: 2013–present

Career history

Playing
- 1989–2000: Vllaznia
- 2000–2004: Bashkimi
- 2005–2008: Vllaznia

Coaching
- 2013–2016: Vllaznia
- 2018–2022: Vllaznia women
- 2021: Albania U-18
- 2022–2024: Vllaznia women
- 2023–2024: Vllaznia (assistant)
- 2024: Bashkimi (assistant)
- 2024–2025: Bashkimi
- 2025–present: Bashkimi (assistant)

Career highlights
- As player: 5× Albanian League champion (1990, 1993, 1997, 1998, 2000); Albanian Supercup winner (1999); Kosovo Cup winner (2000); As head coach: 3× Albanian League champion (2013–2016); 2x Albanian Cup winner (2014, 2015)

Bledar Gjeçaj (born 4 March 1970) is an Albanian basketball coach and former basketball player. He is currently an assistant coach for Bashkimi of the Kosovo Basketball Superleague. He was part of the Albania national team from 1992 until 2004.

== Personal life ==
His son, Veton Gjeçaj, is also a professional basketball player and plays currently for Bashkimi.
