= Arian Azemi =

Kosovan basketball player

No. 1 – Bashkimi
- Position: Point guard
- League: Kosovo Basketball Superleague; Liga Unike

Personal information
- Born: 3 March 1999 (age 27) Brooklyn, New York, U.S.
- Listed height: 1.88 m (6 ft 2 in)

Career information
- College: Rowan (2020–2022)
- Playing career: 2022–present

Career history
- 2022–2024: Istogu
- 2024–2025: Vëllaznimi
- 2025–2026: Prishtina
- 2026–present: Bashkimi

Career highlights
- Liga Unike champion (2025); Liga Unike MVP (2025); Kosovo First League champion (2022); Kosovo First League MVP (2022)

Arian Azemi (born 3 March 1999) is an American-Albanian professional basketball player for Bashkimi of the Kosovo Basketball Superleague and Liga Unike.

== Professional career ==
=== KB Istogu (2022–2024) ===
In 2022, Azemi signed for Istogu of the Kosovo First League. He was the MVP of the 2022–2023 First League season and helped the team to promote to the Kosovo Superleague.

=== KB Vëllaznimi (2024–2025) ===
On August 16 2024, Azemi signed for Vëllaznimi of the Kosovo Superleague. In 2025, Vëllaznimi won the Liga Unike and he selected the MVP of the league.

=== KB Prishtina (2025–2026) ===
On July 15, 2025, Azemi signed for Prishtina of the Kosovo Superleague.
