= KB Besa =

Professional basketball club in Kosovo

- Leagues: Kosovo Superleague; Kosovo Cup
- Founded: 1961; 2012
- Folded: 2015
- Arena: Karagaq Sports Hall (2,500 seats)
- Location: Pejë, Kosovë
- Team colors: red and white
- President: Arbër Elshani
- Head coach: Fabian Gjuka
- Championships: 1x Kosovo First League (2013)
Home

KB Besa Pejë was the first basketball team from Pejë founded in 1961. Besa was part of the Kosovo Superleague before dissolving in 2015.

== History ==
The team was founded in 1961, and its first name was KB Buduçnosti. These years team have present Kosovo in first league of Yugoslavia with great results and a lot of trophy winners. In 1979–80 the Albanian board of the team had to change name of club from Buduçnost to Ramiz Sadiku. The ex-secretary of team, Muhamet Ahma, who was also the first coach of the new team. In this year the team debuted in Balkanska league who lost in the semi-final to Mornar Bar 74–75. The best player was Blerim Vuniqi. Then Besa continued to play in the local league and in 1992 they were in the final of the play-offs against Prishtina and lost 30–36.

In 2012–2013 Arber Elshani was elected as president and he backed Besa Pejë team to win the First League in 2012–2013 and to be part of Superleague after great season. Elshani as the president of team for first time in team make some great thinks to make history. Firstly, he brought one from the best coaches in Croatia. The new head coach of Besa in that time was Boris Kurtovic who led the team to the semi-final of final four of the Kosovo Cup after a big win against Trepça in Gjakova with great result 70–83 with all local players. Then Elshani brought ex-Real Madrid player Venson Hamilton who for the fans in 2014 was totally unbelievable, Hamilton coming and in his first game he scored 25 points, 25 rebounds and 10 blocked shots to help Besa team to win against RTV21. However, he was released due to an injury in the same season.

Besa since 2015 have been out from all leagues in Federation after a conflict between the president of Federation and the board of Besa.

== Titles and honors ==
=== Domestic ===
- Kosovo First League (1):

2013

== Notable players ==
- (Albania) Beq Kovaqi
- (Kosovo) Arti Hajdari
- (Kosovo) Arian Qollaku
- (Kosovo) Lis Shoshi
- (South Africa) Cedrick Kalombo Lukanda
- (United States) Venson Hamilton
- (Socialist Federal Republic of Yugoslavia) (Kosovo) Agim Kasapolli (sq)
- (Socialist Federal Republic of Yugoslavia) (Kosovo) Blerim Vuniqi (sq)

== See also ==
- KF Besa Pejë (football)
- KH Besa Famgas (handball)
