= KB KEKU =

Professional basketball club in Kosovo

- Nickname: Elektricistët (Electricians)
- Leagues: Kosovo Basketball First League
- Founded: 2012 as AS Kastrioti; 2 August 2022 as KB KEKU
- Arena: Salla e sporteve "Adem Jashari" (1000 + 200 seats)
- Location: Kastriot, Kosovo
- Team colors: Green and black
- Head coach: Valentin Spaqi
- Championships: Second Division Champions 2023/24
Home	Away

Klubi i Basketbollit Korporata Energjetike e Kosovës (transl. Kosovo Energy Corporation Basketball Club), commonly known as KB KEKU, is a professional basketball club based in Kastriot, Kosovo. The club currently plays in the Kosovo Basketball Second League. Its fan club is called Elektricistët, or Electricians.

== History ==
The club was founded as AS Kastrioti in 2012 by some young basketball fans from nearby Pristina. In 2022, the club was refounded with the name KB KEKU having the same identity as the former club. In 2024, KEKU won the Kosovo Second League against Grapeland from Rahovec promoting to the First League.

== Arena ==
The club currently plays in the sport center "Adem Jashari", in the center of Kastriot, with a capacity for around 1000 spectators.

== Honours ==
- Kosovo Second League (1): 2023–2024

== See also ==
- KF KEK
