= Basketball Federation of Kosovo =

- Sport: Basketball
- Jurisdiction: Kosovo
- Abbreviation: FBK
- Founded: 1991
- Regional affiliation: FIBA Europe
- Affiliation date: 2015
- Headquarters: Pristina
- Location: Pristina
- President: Arben Fetahu
- Vice president: Shaqir Tolaj
- Sponsor: TEB etc.

Official website
- www.basketbolli.com
- (Kosovo)

The Basketball Federation of Kosovo (Albanian: Federata e Basketbollit e Kosovës, Serbian: Кошаркашки савез Косова/Košarkaški savez Kosova) is the governing body of basketball in Kosovo. It organizes the Kosovo Basketball Superleague and the Kosovo Basketball Cup. It has also fielded a team which has represented Kosovo in international friendlies.

== History ==
Kosovo Basketball Federation was founded in 1991. During the Yugoslavian era, Kosovo had own Superleague and lower divisions in both genders. In the 1990s, Kosovo declared political and sports independence from Yugoslavian system, organising its own league based with different teams from major cities of Kosovo. Kosovo was not allowed to play international matches, not even friendlies by FIBA, until 2015 when Kosovo Basketball Federation became official member of FIBA World and FIBA Europe.

Initially the Basketball Federation of Kosovo was denied entry into the International Basketball Federation (FIBA), the last rejection taking place in Beijing at the annual FIBA Central Board meeting on 26 April 2008, with the reason: "Kosovo has not fulfilled all required conditions".

The Basketball Federation of Kosovo was accepted as a full member of FIBA on 13 March 2015. Serbian basketball federation KSS seeks to ban any Kosovo vs Serbia games.

Emblem used prior to 2008

Topi i basketbollit, që Hajrullah Morina e kishte sjellë në Gjakovë nga Torino, ku kishte studiuar besohet se shënon fillimin e basketbollit në Kosovë.

Thuhet se basketbolli në Kosovë ka filluar të luhet në vitet e 40-ta, por shënime për ndeshje të organizuara ka që nga viti 1945, kur u themelua klubi i parë i basketbollit në Prizren.

== Kosovo competitions ==
=== Men ===
- Kosovo Basketball Superleague
- Kosovo Basketball First League
- Kosovo Cup
- Kosovo Basketball Second League
- TEB U21 League
- TEB U18 League
- TEB U16 League
- TEB U12 League (Group A&Group B)

=== Women ===
- Kosovo Women's Basketball Superleague

== International competitions ==
=== Senior teams ===
- Men's national team
- Women's national team

=== Youth teams ===
- Kosovo national under-20 basketball team
- Kosovo national under-18 basketball team
- Kosovo national under-16 basketball team
- Kosovo national under-14 basketball team

== See also ==
- Kosovo national basketball team
