= KB Drita =

Professional basketball club in Kosovo

- Leagues: Liga e Parë e Basketbollit; Kosovo Cup
- Founded: 1958; 68 years ago
- Arena: Sport Hall "Bashkim Selishta"
- Capacity: 3.000
- Location: Gjilan, Kosovo
- Team colors: White and blue
- President: (Kosovo)
- Head coach: (Kosovo) Gyltekin Selimi
Home	Away

KB Drita is a basketball club based in Gjilan, Kosovo^{[a]} (Gjilan is the Albanian name of the town).

Created in 1958, the club won the Basketball Superleague of Kosovo in 1996. KB Drita also has a women's club.

== History ==
The club was formed in 1958 with the name "Drita" which means "light" in the Albanian language. The name was taken from other sports clubs in the city. Drita won the Kosovo Superleague against Prishtina in 1997. In 2024, Drita relegated to the Kosovo Second League after losing against Grapeland in the play-out. In 2025, they had a spot in the Kosovo Basketball First League and in 2026 they qualified for the Kosovo Basketball Superleague after defeating KB Prizreni. In July 15, KB Drita announced that they are not licensed to be a part of the Kosovo Basketball Superleague, as they lack a gym.

== Honours ==
=== Domestic ===
Kosovo Superleague

- Winners (1): 1997

Kosovo First League

- Winners (3): 2012, 2021, 2026

== Roster ==
KB Drita roster
Players
Coaches

Pos.	No.	Nat.	Name	Ht.	Wt.	Age
	4		Hyseni, Egzon
	5		Hyseni, Alban
	6		Aliu, Burim
	7		Ramadani, Herolind
	8		Demi, Qendrim
	9		Sadiku, Drin
	10		Sylejmani, Driton
	11		Demolli, Bexhet
	12		Ibrahimi, Laurant
	13		Kurteshi, Florian
	14		Jakupi, Bardh
	15		Demi, Ukshin

Head coach

- (Kosovo) Gyltekin Selimi

Assistant coach(es)

- (Kosovo) Afrim Selimi

Legend

- (C) Team captain
- Injured

== Notable players ==
- (Kosovo) Qëndrim Demi
- (Kosovo) Alban Hyseni
- (Kosovo) Artan Mehmeti
- (Kosovo) Eroll Pepiqi
- (North Macedonia) (Kosovo) Muhamed Thaçi
- (United States) Edderick Womack
