= Dardan Berisha =

Kosovar basketball player (born 1988)

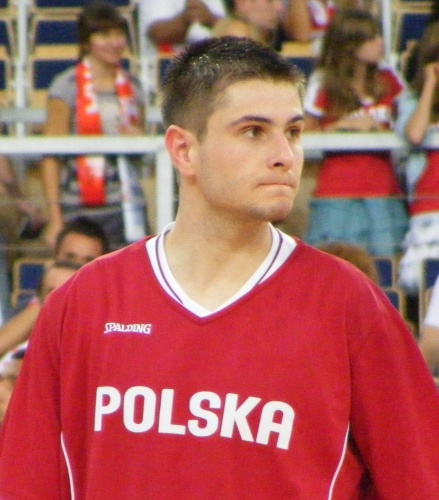
- Berisha in 2010

No. 11 – Peja
- Position: Shooting guard
- League: Kosovo Superleague; Liga Unike

Personal information
- Born: 15 November 1988 (age 38) Peja, SFR Yugoslavia
- Listed height: 1.91 m (6 ft 3 in)
- Listed weight: 90 kg (198 lb)

Career information
- NBA draft: 2010: undrafted
- Playing career: 2006–present

Career history
- 2006–2007: Peja
- 2007: Cáceres
- 2007–2008: Trujillo
- 2008–2010: Polonia Warszawa
- 2010–2012: Anwil Włocławek
- 2012–2013: Peja
- 2013–2015: Prishtina
- 2015: Cibona
- 2015–2016: Prishtina
- 2016–2017: Kutno
- 2017: Juvecaserta
- 2017: Prishtina
- 2017–2018: ČEZ Nymburk
- 2018–2019: Prishtina
- 2019–2022: Peja
- 2022–2024: Prishtina
- 2024–present: Peja

Career highlights
- Liga Unike champion (2022); 3× Balkan League champion (2015, 2016, 2024); NBL champion (2018); 4× Kosovo Superleague champion (2004, 2013–2015); 2× Kosovo Cup winner (2014, 2020); Balkan League MVP (2015); 3× Kosovo Superleague MVP (2013–2015); PLK Rookie of the Year (2010)

Dardan Berisha (born 15 November 1988) is a Kosovan professional basketball player for Peja. A Polish citizen through descent, he represented Poland internationally before switching his allegiance to Kosovo in 2016.

Dardan Berisha considered one of the best players of all time in Kosovo. He won the Kosovo Superleague 4- Times 2- Times with KB Peja and 2- Times With KB Prishtina. He also won Balkan League for the first time for Kosovan Team and also won BIBL MVP for the 2014–15 season. In June 2015, he signed a three-year deal with Croatian club Cibona Zagreb. In October 2015, he left Cibona and returned to KB Prishtina.

Dardan Berisha has played in Eurobasket 2011 with Poland national team where he was one of the best players of Poland in this EuroBasket. In EuroBasket 2011 Dardan Berisha averaged with 13.2 points, 2.9 rebounds and 2.8 assists.

== Professional career ==
Berisha was born in Peja, Kosovo. He started his career in Kosovo in 2001 with KB Peja team. He played abroad in Spain, Poland and Croatia. In 2007–2010, he was the player of Polonia Warszawa, which was promoted and then dropped from the Polish Premier League. On 18 May 2010 he signed a three-year contract with Anwil Wloclawek. In 2012 he returned in Kosovo, signed a contract with KB Peja. Where in this year Berisha won the Kosovo Basketball Superleague and was chosen MVP of the league. From 2013 to 2015 he played in Kosovo with Sigal Prishtina. Where in 2015 Berisha won the Super League of Kosovo and the Balkan League. In June 2015, he was transferred in Croatia in KK Cibona. But Dardan Berisha left Cibona Zagreb to return to Sigal Prishtina. Berisha had played a few games with Cibona averaging 8.8 points per contest. On 18 February 2017, Berisha signed with the Italian team Juvecaserta Basket.

== International career ==
On 2 August 2010, he made his debut in the Poland national team in the match against Georgia. He played in EuroBasket 2011 in the Polish national team, where he was one of the best players that averaged 13.2 points in five games. He decided to represent Kosovo when FIBA finally recognized them in 2015. In 2016, he represented Kosovo on FIBA EuroBasket 2017 qualification tournament.
