= KB Kerasan =

Professional basketball club in Kosovo

- Leagues: Kosovo Basketball First League
- Founded: 2011; 15 years ago
- History: KB Kerasan (-2019); KB Marigona Hill (2019-2020); KB Kerasan (2020-)
- Arena: Salla e Rinisë dhe Sportit
- Capacity: 2,500
- Location: Pristina, Kosovo
- Team colors: Black and wood brown
- President: Vullnet Sefaja
- Head coach: Dritëro Sefaja
Home	Away

KB Kerasan is a professional basketball club based in Pristina, Kosovo. The club plays in the Kosovo Basketball First League. Kerasan competed in the Kosovo Superleague from 2015 until 2018.

== History ==
Kerasan was founded in 2011. In 2015, it was promoted to the Kosovo Superleague after winning against NewBorn Prishtina 2–1 in the final of the First League. From 2020 until 2021 the club was known as Marigona Hills Prishtina for sponsorship reasons.

== Notable players ==
Note: Flags indicate national team eligibility at FIBA-sanctioned events. Players may hold other non-FIBA nationalities not displayed.

Criteria

To appear in this section a player must have either:

- Set a club record or won an individual award while at the club
- Played at least one official international match for their national team at any time
- Played at least one official NBA match at any time.

- (Kosovo) Meriton Ismaili
- (Kosovo) Muhamedali Janjeva
- (Kosovo) Dardan Kapiti
