= Shani Nushi Sports Hall =

Sports venue in Kosovo

- Palestra Shani Nushi
- Location: Gjakovë, Kosovo
- Owner: Gjakovë Municipality
- Capacity: 2,500

Construction
- Renovated: 2010; 2012

Tenants
- KB Vëllaznimi; KH Vëllaznimi; 2015 IHF Emerging Nations Championship

Shani Nushi Sports Hall is a multi–use sports hall in Gjakovë, Kosovo which is the home of both the KB Vëllaznimi basketball and KH Vëllaznimi handball teams.

== History ==
In July 2010, the Gjakovë municipality spent €50,000 on renovations to the sports hall. In September 2012, work began on a complete renovation of the sports hall with funding from the local and central governments as well as the European Union that amounted to €1.1 million.
