= KB Rahoveci =

Professional basketball club in Kosovo

Rahoveci
- Nickname: Vreshtarët
- Leagues: Kosovo First League
- Founded: 2016; 9 years ago
- Dissolved: 2023
- Arena: Mizahir Isma
- Capacity: 4.000
- Location: Rahoveci, Kosovo
- Team colors: blue, white and purple
- Team captain: Blerim Deliu
- Championships: 1 Kosovo First League
- Website: kbrahoveci.org
Home	Away

KB Rahoveci, or simply Rahoveci, was a professional basketball club based in the city Rahoveci, Kosovo. The club last played in the Kosovo Superleague.

== History ==
In the 2016–17 season, the small club from the town of Rahovec got promoted to the Superleague and they managed to finish in sixth position in the table. They were the rivals of Ylli, a club from the nearby city of Theranda. In the 2018–19 Superleague, Rahoveci finished as runners-up behind Prishtina.

On 24 July 2019, it was announced that Rahoveci would make its debut in European competitions. The team qualified for the qualifying rounds of the 2019–20 FIBA Europe Cup. Rahoveci lost both games to U-BT Cluj-Napoca from Romania. Rahoveci relegated to the Kosovo First League after finishing last in the 2022–23 Kosovo Basketball Superleague. They did not play a single game in the First League due to financial problems and dissolved on the 26 September 2023.

== Honours ==
Kosovo Superleague

- Runners-up (1): 2018/19

Kosovo Cup

- Runners-up (1): 2018/19

Kosovo First League

- Winners (1): 2016/17

Liga Unike

- Third Place (1): 2020/21

== Arena ==
The club played in the sport center Mizahir Isma, with a capacity for around 4,000 spectators.

== European record ==
Season	Tier	Competition	Round	Club	Home	Away
2019–20	4	FIBA Europe Cup	Qualifying round	(Romania) U-BT Cluj-Napoca	73–98	47–91

== Players ==
=== 2022 roster ===
KB Rahoveci roster
Players
Coaches
.

Pos.	No.	Nat.	Name	Ht.	Wt.	Age
PG	6	(Kosovo)	Mala, Musab	1.85 m (6 ft 1 in)	75 kg (165 lb)	28 – 17 November 1996
PG	3	(United States)	Carson, Jahii	1.78 m (5 ft 10 in)	82 kg (181 lb)	32 – 31 August 1992
G	0	(Kosovo)	Krasniqi, Indrit	1.75 m (5 ft 9 in)	70 kg (154 lb)	24 – 27 June 2001
G	21	(Kosovo)	Jupa, Ahmet	1.83 m (6 ft 0 in)	60 kg (132 lb)	22 – 26 September 2002
G/F	0	(United States)	Johnson, Devin	1.96 m (6 ft 5 in)	88 kg (194 lb)	30 – 12 December 1994
SF	11	(Kosovo)	Kryeziu, Edmond	1.9 m (6 ft 3 in)	88 kg (194 lb)	27 – 16 June 1998
F	12	(Kosovo)	Ejupi, Visar	1.97 m (6 ft 6 in)	88 kg (194 lb)	22 – 3 April 2003
F	35	(Kosovo)	Rexha, Bardh	1.98 m (6 ft 6 in)
PF		(United States)	Seeley, Chris	2.03 m (6 ft 8 in)	100 kg (220 lb)	27 – 11 April 1998
PF/C	32	(United States)	Worrell, Rasheed	2.03 m (6 ft 8 in)	100 kg (220 lb)	28 – 9 July 1996

Head coach

(Kosovo) Muhamed Thaçi

Assistant coach(es)

- (Kosovo) Blerim Delibeqa
- (United States) Islam Hoxha

Legend

- (C) Team captain
- Injured

=== Depth chart ===
Pos.	Starting 5	Bench 1	Bench 2
C	Rasheed Worrell
PF	Chris Seeley	Bardh Rexha
SF	Edmond Kryeziu	Visar Ejupi	Ahmet Jupa
SG	Musab Mala	Devin Johnson	Idrit Krasniqi
PG	Jahii Carson

=== Notable players ===
- (Kosovo) Visar Ejupi
- (Kosovo) Atik Koshi
- (Kosovo) Musab Malaj
- (Kosovo) Leonard Mekaj
- (Kosovo) Arian Qollaku
- (Kosovo) Bardh Rexha
- (Kosovo) Fisnik Rugova
- (Kosovo) Gazmend Sinani
- (South Sudan) Makol Mawien
- (Ukraine) Igor Chumakov
- (United States Virgin Islands) Justin Gray
