= KB Vëllaznimi =

Professional basketball club in Kosovo

- Nickname: Kuqezinjtë e Jakovës
- Leagues: Kosovo Superleague; Kosovo Cup; Liga Unike
- Founded: 1948
- Arena: Shani Nushi Sports Hall (2,500 seats)
- Location: Gjakovë, Kosovë
- Team colors: Red, Black
- President: Ideal Bakija
- Team manager: Ardit Gjoshi
- Head coach: Gyltekin Selimi
- Team captain: Atik Koshi
Home	Away

KB Vëllaznimi Gjakovë is a professional basketball team that plays in the Kosovo Superleague. The club is part of the multidisciplinary Vëllaznimi Gjakovë, whose football team is called KF Vëllaznimi and its handball team KH Vëllaznimi.

== History ==
Vëllaznimi is a club with many years of tradition in Kosovar Basketball. Vëllaznimi was founded in 1948, where it first participated in the first championship organized in Kosovo in 1949. After a few years, Vëllaznimi played in the First B Federal Basketball League, the country's second-tier basketball competition. After the formation of the Kosovo Basketball Federation, Vëllaznimi has been part of the Kosovar Basketball League for many years.

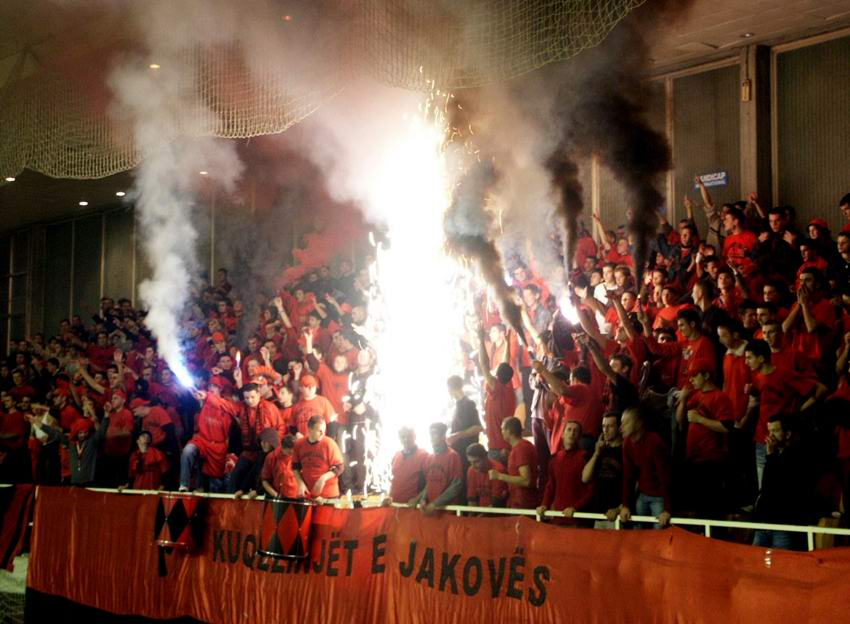
Kuqezinjët e Jakovës – KB Vëllaznimi fans.

== Honors and titles ==
=== Domestic ===
- Kosovo Superleague
  - Runners-up (2): 1990/91, 1995/96
- Kosovo Cup
  - Winners (2): 1992, 1996
- Kosovo First League
  - Winners (4): 2004, 2013, 2020, 2022

=== Regional ===
Liga Unike

- Winners (1): 2024–25

== Roster ==
KB Vëllaznimi roster
Players
Coaches

Pos.	No.	Nat.	Name	Ht.	Wt.	Age
PG		(Kosovo)	Shoshaj, Fatlind	1.83 m (6 ft 0 in)	80 kg (176 lb)	23 – 22 November 2002
SG	11	(Kosovo)	Koshi, Atik	1.85 m (6 ft 1 in)
CG	1	(Kosovo)	Azemi, Arian	1.80 m (5 ft 11 in)
CG	9	(United States)	Hellems, Jericole	1.95 m (6 ft 5 in)
SF	15	(Kosovo)	Sinani, Arber	2.01 m (6 ft 7 in)
SF	4	(United States)	Jones, Myreon	1.93 m (6 ft 4 in)
F	6	(Kosovo)	Cingu, Eden
F	0	(United States)	Walker, Antwan	2.03 m (6 ft 8 in)
C	33	(United States)	Jitoboh, Jason	2.11 m (6 ft 11 in)
PF	3	(United States)	Anderson, Tray	2.01 m (6 ft 7 in)
SG	2	(Kosovo)	Bedra, Ambri

Head coach

- Jeronimo Sarin

Assistant coach

- Dorant Hana

Legend

- (C) Driton Rraci

=== Depth chart ===
Pos.	Starting 5	Bench 1	Bench 2
C	Jason Jitoboh	Antwan Walker
PF	Tray Anderson	Arber Sinani
SF	Jericole Hellems	Atik Koshi
SG	Arian Azemi	Eden Cingu
PG	Don Polloshka	Myreon Jones	Ambri Bedra

== Notable players ==
- (Albania) Robert Shestani
- (Albania) (Kosovo) Daniel Lekndreaj
- (Bosnia and Herzegovina) Abdurahman Kahrimanović
- (Kosovo) Arian Azemi
- (Kosovo) Besnik Azemi
- (Kosovo) Atik Koshi
- (Kosovo) Shendrit Llapi
- (Kosovo) Musab Malaj
- (Kosovo) Don Polloshka
- (Kosovo) Bardh Rexha
- (Kosovo) Driton Rraci
- (Kosovo) Burim Zekiqi
- (Kosovo) Samir Zekiqi
- (North Macedonia) Enes Haxhibuliq
- (Nigeria) Emmanuel Omogbo
- (United States) Tiwian Kendley
- (United States) Terrick Phillips
- (United States) Ronnie Ross
- (Socialist Federal Republic of Yugoslavia) (Kosovo) Vllaznim Rraci
- (Socialist Federal Republic of Yugoslavia) (Kosovo) Kastriot Zherka
- (United States) Jericole Hellems
