= Karagaq Sports Hall =

Sports hall from Kosovo

- Palestra Sportive Karagaqi
- Interactive map of Karagaq Sports Hall
- Location: Peja, Kosovo
- Coordinates: 42.6521°N 20.2921°E
- Owner: Pejë Municipality
- Capacity: 2,500

Tenants
- KB Peja; KH Besa Famgas

Karagaq Sports Hall is a multi–use sports hall in Peja, Kosovo, which is the home of KB Peja and KH Besa Famgas. Until 2015, it also was the home of KB Besa which is now defunct.
