= KB Ylli =

Professional basketball club in Kosovo

KB Golden Eagle Ylli
- Nickname: Xhebrailat
- Leagues: Kosovo Basketball Superleague; Liga Unike
- Founded: 1975; 51 years ago
- Arena: Salla e Sporteve 13 Qërshori
- Capacity: 1,300
- Location: Theranda, Kosovo
- Team colors: Yellow, Blue
- Main sponsor: Golden Eagle
- President: Lendrit Palushi
- Vice-president: Ermir Palushi
- Head coach: Rami Hadar
- Team captain: Gëzim Morina
- 2025–26 position: 4th
- Championships: 2 Kosovo Basketball Superleague; 2 Liga Unike; 1 Superkupa Mbarëkombëtare
Home	Away

KB Ylli, known as Golden Eagle Ylli for sponsorship reasons, is a professional basketball club based in Theranda, Kosovo. The club currently plays in the Kosovo Basketball Superleague. Its fan club is called Xhebrailat.

== History ==
KB Ylli is one of the oldest basketball clubs in Kosovo. It was founded in 1975. The club is known for its fans who support their club in especially in home games at 13 Qërshori sports hall. Their home matches are known for the fantastic atmosphere created by "Xhebrailat". Ylli means "star" in English.

In 2008 the club decided to withdraw from Kosovo Superleague due to bad financial conditions, and didn't play until 2014 when Golden Eagle, a beverage company from Theranda, decided to be the main sponsor of the team and to pay for Wild Card which returned KB Ylli in Kosovo Superleague. The 2015–16 season was the second consecutive in the Kosovo Superleague. In the 2014–15 season, they finished fourth and played in playoff finals against Sigal Prishtina. In the 2018-19 season of Kosovo Basketball Superleague they finished second and lost the semi-finals of the play off against KB Rahoveci. In the 2019-20 season they lost the final of Kosovan Cup against KB Peja.

In 2021, Ylli won their first league title and the Liga Unike. In the following year, Ylli won the league title again.

== Honours ==
- Kosovo Superleague:
  - Winners (2): 2020–21, 2021–22
  - Runners-up (2): 1994–95, 2023–24
- Kosovo Cup:
  - Runners-up (2): 2019–20, 2020–21
- Liga Unike:
  - Winners (2): 2020–21, 2025-26
  - Runners-up(2): 2021-22, 2023–24
- Superkupa Mbarëkombëtare
  - Winners (1): 2021

== Arena ==
The club currently plays in the sport center Palestra 13 Qershori, in the center of Theranda, with a capacity for around 1300 spectators.

== Season by Season ==
=== KB Golden Eagle Ylli (2014–2024) ===
Seasons	Division	Pos.	Play Offs	Kosovo Cup	Liga Unike	Kosovo Supercup	European competitions
2014-15	1	4th	Semifinalist	Semifinalist	—	—	—
2015-16	1	5th	—	QF	—	—	—
2016-17	1	5th	—	QF	—	—	—
2017-18	1	4th	Semifinalist	Semifinalist	—	—	—
2018-19	1	2nd	Semifinalist	Semifinalist	—	—	—
2019-20	1	3rd	Postponed	Runner-up	—	—	—
2020-21	1	3rd	Champion	Runner-up	Champion	Semifinalist	—
2021-22	1	1st	Champion	Semifinalist	Runner-Up	Semifinalist	—
2022–23	1	3rd	Semifinalist	Semifinalist	Postponed	Semifinalist	Champions League QF1 FIBA Europe Cup RS
2023–24	1	3rd	Runner-Up	Semifinalist	Runner-Up	Semifinalist	—
2024–25	1	5th	Quarterfinalist	Quarterfinalist	Third place	Semifinalist	—
2025-26	1	4th	Quarterfinalist	TBD	Champion	Postponed	—

== Matches in European competitions ==
Season	Competition	Round	Opponent	Home	Away
2022-23	Champions League	QR1	(Portugal) Benfica		67–92
2022-23	FIBA Europe Cup	RS	(Israel) Hapoel Galil Elyon	76–93	73–85
2022-23	FIBA Europe Cup	RS	(Germany) Brose Bamberg	60–76	81–78
2022-23	FIBA Europe Cup	RS	(Germany) Niners Chemnitz	72–101	60–90

== Players ==
=== Current roster ===
Note: Flags indicate national team eligibility at FIBA-sanctioned events. Players may hold other non-FIBA nationalities not displayed.

Golden Eagle Ylli roster
Players
Coaches

Pos.	No.	Nat.	Name	Ht.	Age
G	0	(United States)	Rideau, LaQuincy	1.85 m (6 ft 1 in)	30 – 28 March 1996
C	1	(Kosovo)	Shoshi, Lis	2.11 m (6 ft 11 in)	32 – 29 June 1994
PF	3	(United States)	Withers, Connor	2.03 m (6 ft 8 in)	26 – 28 June 2000
G	4	(Kosovo)	Malaj, Musab	1.85 m (6 ft 1 in)	29 – 17 November 1996
F	5	(Kosovo)	Gashi, Artin	2.03 m (6 ft 8 in)	33 – 28 April 1993
PF	6	(Kosovo) (Slovenia)	Morina, Gëzim (C)	2.04 m (6 ft 8 in)	33 – 12 December 1992
G/F	7	(United States)	Thomas, Davontrey	1.96 m (6 ft 5 in)	25 – 5 October 2001
G	8	(United States)	Shabazz, Khalil	1.83 m (6 ft 0 in)	27 – 11 November 1998
G	10	(Canada)	Bandoo, Devonte	1.90 m (6 ft 3 in)	30 – 12 September 1996
F/C	12	(Kosovo)	Shala, Drilon	2.06 m (6 ft 9 in)	24 – 20 March 2002
F	13	(United States)	Thomas, Dustin	2.03 m (6 ft 8 in)	31 – 26 July 1995
G	22	(Kosovo)	Bedra, Ambri	1.85 m (6 ft 1 in)	19 – 2 April 2007
G/F	28	(Kosovo)	Kastrati, Erjon	1.98 m (6 ft 6 in)	31 – 30 December 1994
SG	77	(Kosovo)	Shala, Altin	1.95 m (6 ft 5 in)	22 – 15 August 2004

Head coach

- (Israel) Rami Hadar

Assistant coach(es)

- (Kosovo) Endrit Elshani
- (Israel) Moran Vermus

Physiotherapist(s)

- (Kosovo) Albion Ramadani
- (Kosovo) Milaim Berisha

Legend

- (C) Team captain
- Injured

=== Depth chart ===
Pos.	Starting 5	Bench 1	Bench 2
C	Lis Shoshi	Gëzim Morina	Drilon Shala
PF	Connor Withers	Dustin Thomas	Artin Gashi
SF	Davontrey Thomas	Erjon Kastrati
SG	Musab Malaj	Devonte Bandoo	Altin Shala
PG	Khalil Shabazz	LaQuincy Rideau	Ambri Bedra

=== Notable players ===
- (Albania) Nikolla Haruni
- (Albania) Renaldo Kacori
- (Albania) Frenki Lilaj
- (Bosnia and Herzegovina) Ismet Sejfić
- (Cameroon) Alexis Wangmene
- (Cape Verde) Will Tavares
- (Croatia) Henrik Širko
- (Kosovo) Valon Bunjaku
- (Kosovo) Artin Gashi
- (Kosovo) Erjon Kastrati
- (Kosovo) Blerim Mazreku
- (Kosovo) Ardit Pepaj
- (Kosovo) Samir Zekiqi
- (Kosovo) Urim Zenelaj
- (Kosovo) (Croatia) Jan Palokaj
- (Kosovo) (Slovenia) Gezim Morina
- (Kosovo) (Turkey) Arber Berisha
- (United States) Dajuan Graf
- (United States) Chris Harris
- (United States) (Kosovo) Malcolm Armstead
