= Kosovo Basketball First League =

- Organising body: Basketball Federation of Kosovo
- Founded: 2001; 25 years ago
- First season: 2001–02
- Country: Kosovo
- Confederation: FIBA Europe (Europe)
- Number of teams: 8
- Level on pyramid: 2
- Promotion to: Kosovo Superleague
- Relegation to: Kosovo Second League
- Domestic cup: Kosovo Cup
- Current champions: Drita (2025–26)
- TV partners: RTV21; RTK
- Website: Liga e Parë

Kosovo Basketball First League (Albanian: Liga e Parë e Kosovës në Basketboll) is the second-tier professional basketball league in Kosovo. It was founded in 2001 it is run by the Basketball Federation of Kosovo.

== Rules ==
=== Competition format ===
The league, operated by the Basketball Federation of Kosovo, consists of Kosovo Basketball First League which have 10 teams. For the 2014–15 season, the top team in "Kosovo Basketball First League" will be promoted to Kosovo Basketball Superleague and second best will play in an Relegation Playoff with the second from the bottom of Kosovo Basketball Superleague. The teams positioned 9th, 10th, in Kosovo Basketball First League will be relegated to a lower league – Kosovo Basketball Second League.

=== Arena standards ===
Currently, clubs must have home arenas with capacity of minimum 1000 seats.

== History ==
The first basketball league in Kosovo started in 2001.

== 2025/26 teams ==
Team	City	Arena	Capacity
KB Borea	Pejë	Karagaq Sports Hall	3,000
KB Prizreni	Prizreni	Qendra Sportive "Sezai Surroi"	3,500
KB Istogu	Istog	Karagaq Sports Hall	3,000
KB KEKU	Kastriot	Salla e sporteve "Adem Jashari"	1,000
KB Kerasan	Pristina	Salla e Rinisë dhe Sportit	2,500
KB Kosova Vushtrri	Vushtrri	Palestra Sportive Jeton Terrstena	2,000
KB New Basket	Prizren	Qendra Sportive "Sezai Surroi"	3,500
KB Drita	KB Drita	Sport Hall "Bashkim Selishta"	3,000

== Competition finals ==
Season	Winner	Result	Finalist
2009–2010	Mitrovica	–	
2010–2011	Kolegji	–	
2011–2012	Drita	–	
2012–2013	Studenti	–	
2013–2014	Vëllaznimi	–	
2014–2015	Kerasan	2–1	NewBorn
2015–2016	Rahoveci	2–0	Drita
2016–2017	Borea	2–0	Drita
2017–2018	Lipjani	1–1	Kalaja
2018–2019	Feronikeli	2–1	Vëllaznimi
2020–2021	Drita	2–0	Istogu
2021–2022	Vëllaznimi	2–0	Prishtina e Re
2022–2023	Istogu	2–0	Bora
2023–2024	Bora	2–0	New Basket
2024–2025	Grapeland	2–1	KEKU
2025–2026	KB Drita	2–0	Prizreni

== Other competitions ==
- Kosovo Basketball Cup
