= Palace of Youth and Sports =

Building in Pristina, Kosovo

- Pallati i Rinisë dhe Sporteve
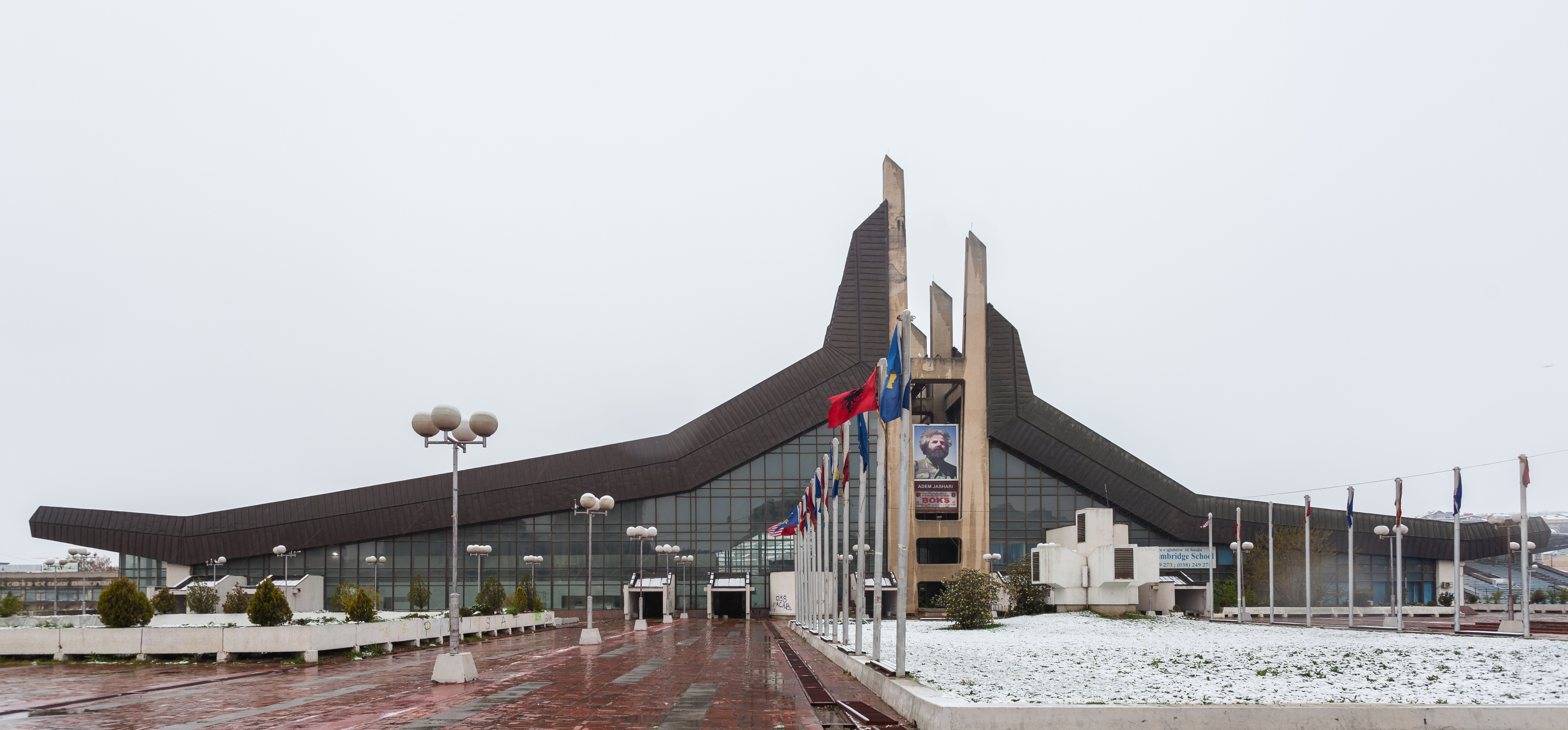
- Palace of Youth and Sports in April 2014
- Interactive map of Palace of Youth and Sports
- Former names: Boro and Ramiz
- Location: Pristina, Kosovo
- Coordinates: 42.6611°N 21.1572°E
- Owner: Disputed between the Municipality of Pristina and the Kosovo Privatization Agency
- Capacity: 8,000 (larger arena); 2,800 (smaller arena)

Construction
- Groundbreaking: 1975
- Opened: 1977; 49 years ago
- Renovated: 2000, 2014, 2023
- Architects: Živorad Janković and Halid Muhasilović

Tenant
- KB Prishtina (basketball)

Website
- www.pallatirinise.com

Palace of Youth and Sports (Albanian: Pallati i Rinisë dhe Sporteve; Serbian: Палата омладине и спорта, romanized: Palata omladine i sporta), formerly named Boro and Ramiz (Albanian: Boro-Ramiz; Serbian: Боро и Рамиз), is a multi-purpose hall located in Pristina, Kosovo. It includes two indoor arenas, the larger of which had a capacity of 8,000 spectators but is currently out of use, and the smaller in-use with a capacity of 2,800 spectators. It also includes a shopping mall, indoor parking, two convention halls and a library. The building in its entirety measures over 10,000 m^{2} (110,000 sq ft).

The Palace of Youth and Sports is expected to be a venue for the 2030 Mediterranean Games which is to be hosted by Kosovo.

== History ==
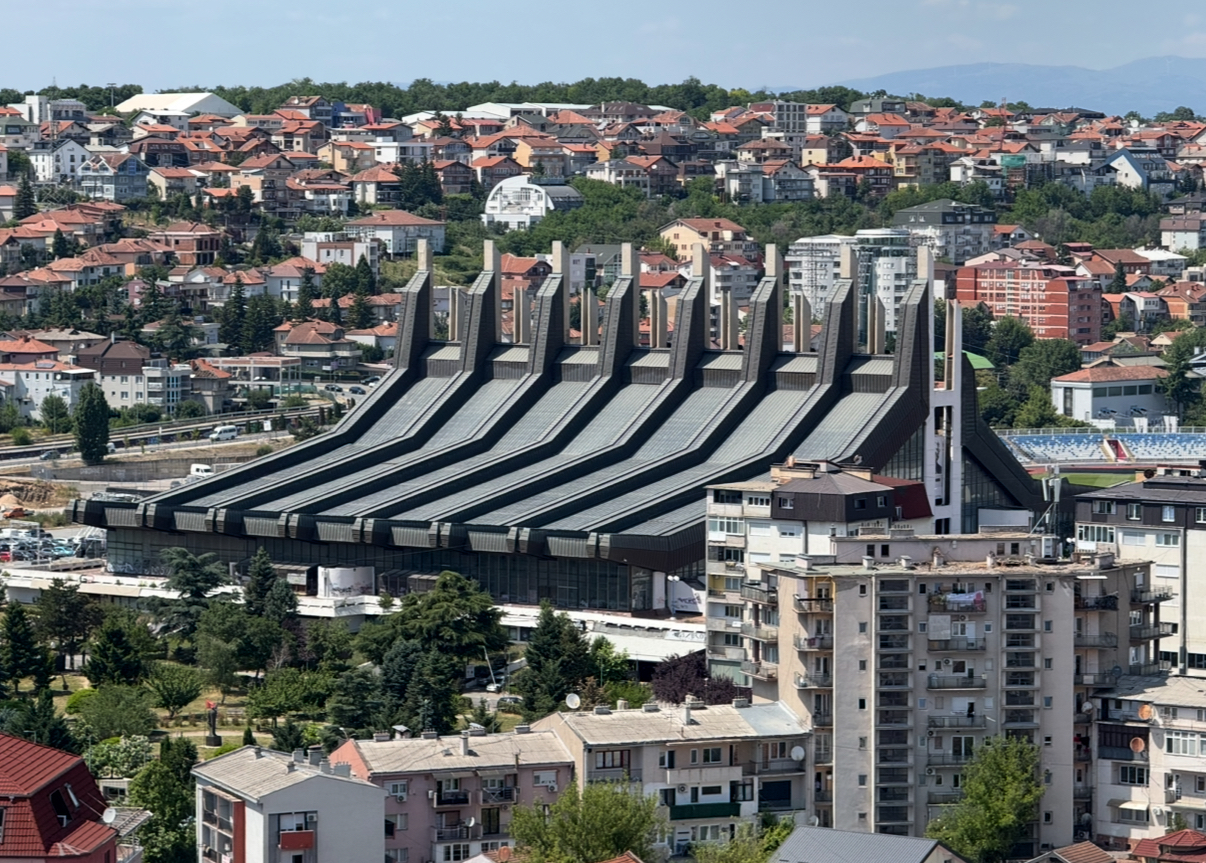
The palace as seen from the Cathedral of Saint Mother Teresa (2025)

In 1975, a referendum was held, and citizens of Pristina, then capital of the Socialist Autonomous Province of Kosovo, voted in favor of building a large hall. The complex was finished in 1977. It was originally named "Boro and Ramiz", after Boro Vukmirović and Ramiz Sadiku, two World War II Yugoslav Partisans and People's heroes of Yugoslavia. Vukmirović was a Serb, while Sadiku was an Albanian, therefore named so to symbolize brotherhood and unity between Serbs and Albanians.

The building was heavily damaged in a fire on 25 February 2000. It was partially renovated, but the larger arena and the convention hall are still out of use. In January 2014, interior renovations totaling 115,000 euros were completed. Further renovations worth 200,000 euros were carried out in 2023 in the smaller arena, in order to bring the floors, baskets and chairs up to FIBA standards. The larger arena is expected to be renovated in time for hosting the 2030 Mediterranean Games.

The ownership of the building is disputed between the Municipality of Pristina and the Kosovo Privatization Agency.

== Building ==
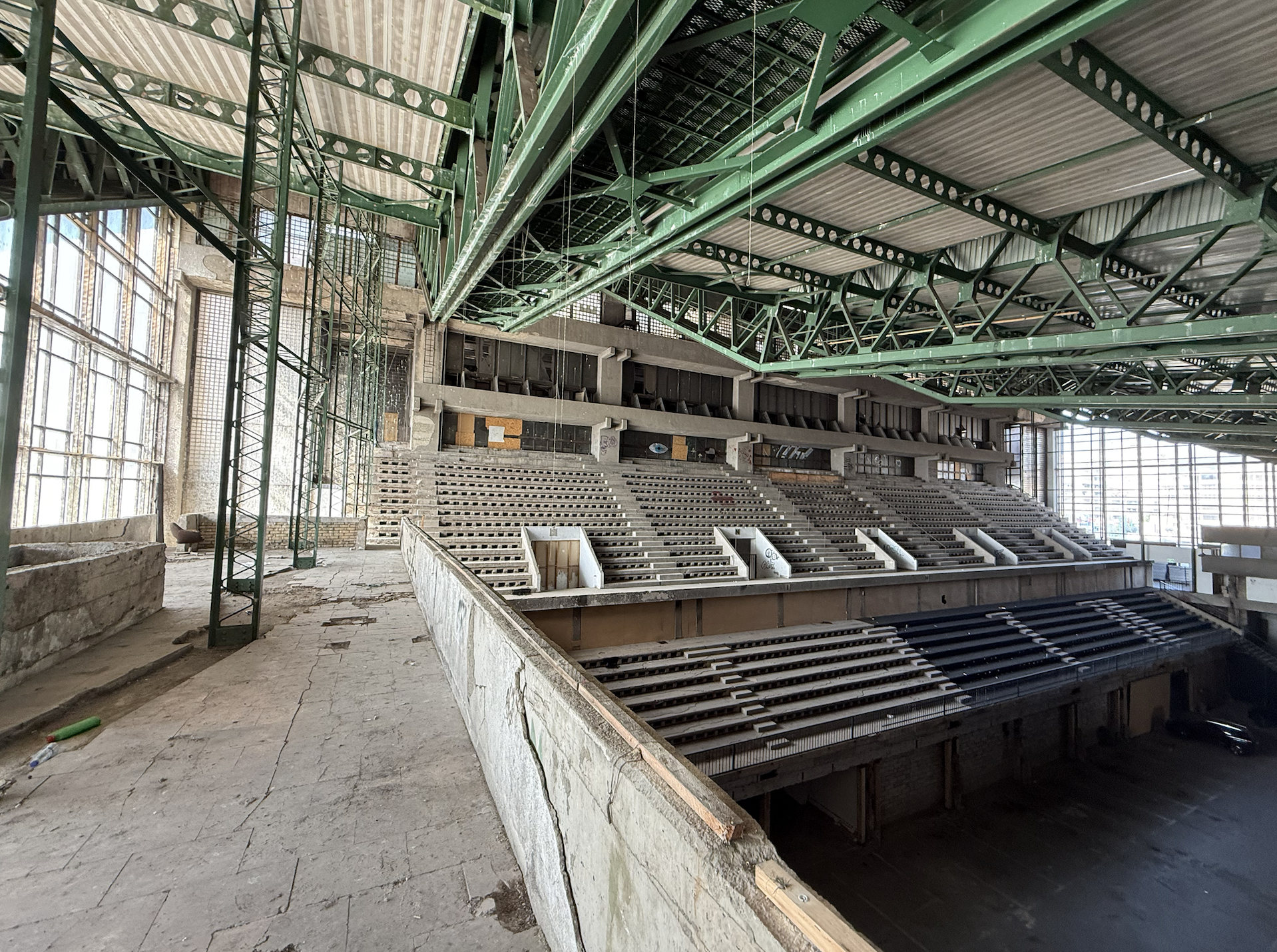
The palace's main arena in June 2025.

The smaller arena is mostly used for basketball by KB Prishtina. In April 2014, it hosted the Final Four of the Balkan Basketball League. The arena is also used for futsal, handball, athletics, basketball, volleyball, numerous other sporting competitions, various concerts, exhibitions, fairs, conventions, and congresses.

The larger arena is currently out of use due to a fire in 2000 and is now used as an indoor car park. Commentators and fans have called for the "Greater Coliseum" to be renovated and used for KB Pristina's home games.

The shopping center has a series of services such as a joint parking lot, 6D cinema, wellness center, numerous restaurants, cafes, and stores.

The Newborn monument is located in front of the building.

The Prishtina Observatory is located in the building complex.

== See also ==
- List of indoor arenas in Kosovo
