= KB Bashkimi =

Professional basketball club in Kosovo

- Leagues: Kosovo Basketball Superleague; Kosovo Cup; Europe Cup
- Founded: 1945; 81 years ago
- History: KB Bashkimi (1945–2009); Big Brother Bashkimi (2009–2011); Sigkos Bashkimi (2011–2013); KB Kosova e Re Bashkimi (2013–2015); KB Bashkimi (2015–present)
- Arena: Sezai Surroi
- Capacity: 4,000
- Location: Prizren, Kosovo
- Team colors: Orange, Black
- Chairman: Kushtrim Kabashi
- President: Astrit Martinaj
- Head coach: Igor Jovović
- Assistant: Bledar Gjeçaj
- Team captain: Valon Bunjaku
- Championships: 1 Kosovo Basketball Superleague; 1 Kosovo Cup
Home	Away	Third

Klubi i Basketbollit Bashkimi, also known as K.B. Bashkimi or simply Bashkimi, is a professional basketball team based in Prizren, Kosovo. Bashkimi is the oldest basketball team in Kosovo and competes in the top-level ProCredit Superliga since 1991. The team's fan club are called Arpagjik't.

== History ==
Klubi i Basketbollit Bashkimi was founded in 1945 in Prizren. It is the oldest basketball team in Kosovo, and one of the oldest in the Balkans. It has traditionally been the most representative sports team of the city of Prizren. Initially competing in the ex-Yugoslavian competitions, Bashkimi was to join the first season of the Kosovo Basketball Superleague in 1991.

2014/15 was the first time Bashkimi participated in an international competition, when the team joined the regional Balkan League. Bashkimi won its first league title in the 2017–18 season.

== Honours ==
=== Domestic competitions ===
- Superliga e Kosovës në Basketboll/Kosovo Basketball Superleague
  - Winners (1): 2017/18
  - Runners-up (4): 2008/09, 2016/17, 2024/25, 2025/26
- Kupa e Kosovës/Kosovo Cup
  - Winners (1): 2000/01
  - Runners-up (9): 1996/97, 2001/02, 2002/03, 2011/12, 2013/14, 2017/18, 2021/22, 2024/25, 2025/26
- Superkupa e Kosovës/Kosovo Supercup
  - Winners (1): 2026
  - Runners-up (2): 2018, 2020

=== European and regional competitions ===
- Balkan League
  - Runners-up (1): 2017/18

== European record ==
Season	Competition	Round	Club	Home	Away
2025–26	FIBA Europe Cup	Qualifying round	(Poland) Anwil Włocławek	80–75	71–93
2025–26	FIBA Europe Cup	Regular season	(Croatia) Cibona	89–69	79–93
2025–26	FIBA Europe Cup	Regular season	(Italy) Reggiana	77–76	65–100
2025–26	FIBA Europe Cup	Regular season	(France) Dijon	74–83	93–84

== Current roster ==
Note: Flags indicate national team eligibility at FIBA-sanctioned events. Players may hold other non-FIBA nationalities not displayed.

Bashkimi roster
Players
Coaches

Pos.	No.	Nat.	Name	Ht.	Age
G/F	00	(United States)	Bailey, Adrio	1.98 m (6 ft 6 in)	29 – 24 June 1997
G	1	(United States) (Albania)	Azemi, Arian	1.88 m (6 ft 2 in)	27 – 3 March 1999
PG	2	(Kosovo)	Jashari, Fis	1.80 m (5 ft 11 in)	18 – 12 April 2008
SG	3	(Puerto Rico)	Clavell, Gian	1.93 m (6 ft 4 in)	32 – 26 November 1993
PG	4	(Kosovo) (United States)	Myles, Divine	1.80 m (5 ft 11 in)	30 – 25 February 1996
PG	6	(Kosovo)	Bunjaku, Valon (C)	1.85 m (6 ft 1 in)	28 – 2 February 1998
SG	7	(United States)	Shorter, Shannon	1.92 m (6 ft 4 in)	37 – 1 August 1989
PF	8	(North Macedonia)	Kakruki, Valmir	2.05 m (6 ft 9 in)	26 – 20 September 2000
SG	10	(Kosovo)	Bytyqi, Besim	1.83 m (6 ft 0 in)	18 – 31 October 2008
SF	13	(Albania)	Gjeçaj, Veton	1.99 m (6 ft 6 in)	21 – 2 December 2004
F	14	(Suriname)	Kensmil, Gavin	2.01 m (6 ft 7 in)	27 – 29 December 1998
F/C	20	(United States)	Lake, De'Quon	2.08 m (6 ft 10 in)	29 – 22 March 1997
PF	24	(United States)	Thomas, Lance	2.08 m (6 ft 10 in)	27 – 18 January 1999
F/C	25	(United States)	Johnson, JaJuan	2.08 m (6 ft 10 in)	37 – 8 February 1989
PF	27	(North Macedonia) (Kosovo)	Zeqiri, Lejson	2.03 m (6 ft 8 in)	25 – 17 September 2001

Head coach

- (Montenegro) Igor Jovović

Assistant coach(es)

- (Albania) Bledar Gjeçaj
- (Kosovo) Elbesar Gështenja

Legend

- (C) Team captain
- Injured

- Roster
Updated: 2026 November 10

=== Depth chart ===
Pos.	Starting 5	Bench 1	Bench 2
C	JaJuan Johnson	Lance Thomas	De'Quon Lake
PF	Lejson Zeqiri	Valmir Kakruki	Gavin Kensmil
SF	Adrio Bailey	Gian Clavell	Veton Gjeçaj
SG	Shannon Shorter	Arian Azemi	Besim Bytyqi
PG	Divine Myles	Valon Bunjaku	Fis Jashari

== Coaching history ==
- (Kosovo) Jeton Nixha (2008–2010)
- (Kosovo) Dervish Agaj (2010–2011)
- (North Macedonia) Naser Oskaček (2011–2012)
- (Kosovo) Edin Kërveshi (2012–2014)
- (Montenegro) Miodrag Baletić (2014–2015)
- (Montenegro) Petar Mijović (2015–2016)
- (Montenegro) Dragan Radović (2016–2017)
- (Montenegro) Predrag Milović (2017)
- (Greece) Fotis Takianos (2017)
- (Greece) Stratos Koukolekidis (2018)
- (Montenegro) Dragan Radović (2018)
- (Croatia) Krunoslav Krajnović (2018–2019)
- (Croatia) Jeronimo Šarin (2019)
- (Kosovo) Illmen Bajra (2019–2021)
- (Croatia) Franko Sterle (2021)
- (Croatia) Branimir Pavić (2021–2022)
- (North Macedonia) Darko Radulović (2022)
- (Lithuania) Audrius Prakuraitis (2022–2023)
- (Kosovo) Edin Kërveshi (2023–2024)
- (North Macedonia) Aleksandar Jončevski (2024)
- (North Macedonia) Darko Radulovic (2024)
- (Albania) Bledar Gjeçaj (2024–2025)
- (Croatia) Saša Janković (2025)
- (Montenegro) Igor Jovović (2025–present)

== Notable players ==
Note: Flags indicate national team eligibility at FIBA-sanctioned events. Players may hold other non-FIBA nationalities not displayed.

Criteria

To appear in this section a player must have either:

- Set a club record or won an individual award while at the club
- Played at least one official international match for their national team at any time
- Played at least one official NBA match at any time.

- (Albania) Bledar Gjeçaj
- (Albania) Endrit Hysenagolli
- (Croatia) Vedran Bosnić
- (Croatia) Davor Pejčinović
- (Ghana) William Njoku
- (Democratic Republic of the Congo) Christian Lutete
- (Republic of Ireland) Brian Fitzpatrick
- (Jamaica) Samardo Samuels
- (Kosovo) Valon Bunjaku
- (Kosovo) Yll Kaçaniku
- (Kosovo) Musab Malaj
- (Kosovo) Altin Morina
- (Kosovo) Granit Rugova
- (Kosovo) Valentin Spaqi
- (Kosovo) Urim Zenelaj
- (Kosovo) Samir Zekiqi
- (North Macedonia) (Kosovo) Valmir Kakruki
- (North Macedonia) (Kosovo) Lejson Zeqiri
- (Turkey) (Albania) Erxhan Osmani
- (United States) Billy Armstrong
- (United States) Lee Benson
- (United States) Justin Black
- (United States) Terrance Ferguson
- (United States) Derek Grimm
- (United States) Schin Kerr
- (United States) Johny Philips
