= Sport in Mitrovica, Kosovo =

Mitrovica, Kosovo is home to several sports teams and venues. The city is known for their success in Sports such as football, basketball and handball. The most known sports clubs are those with the name Trepça. Mitrovica is the birthplace of many known sportspeople.

== Football ==
The oldest football club in the city was KF Ibri and was founded in 1921 by ethnic Albanians. Immediately another club was founded with the name KF Zveçani. Both clubs were dissolved during the Second World War. The most known football club is Trepça and was founded in 1932. KF Trepça was part of the 1977–78 championship in the former Yugoslavia League in football. They became the only Kosovan Football club ever to reach the finals in the Yugoslav Cup. Trepça won the Football Superleague of Kosovo in 1992 and 2010 and the Kosovo Province League in 1947, 1949, 1950, 1952 and 1955. Another club from Mitrovica is KF Trepça '89 (formerly known as Minatori 89) who won the Superleague in 2017. Other active football clubs are KF Mitrovica or KF Bardhi while KF Remonti, KF Shala, KF Bashkimi Shipol, KF Elektroliza or KF Birliku are defunct clubs. The football women's club is called KFF Mitrovica and is the most successful club in the country.

== Basketball ==
KB Trepça is the second most successful club in the country. The club competes domestically in the Kosovo Basketball Superleague and Kosovo Cup and internationally in the Fiba Europe Cup. Trepça has won 6 National Championships, 9 Kosovo Basketball Cups, 3 Kosovo Supercups, 1 Liga Unike and 1 Liga Unike Supercup. In 2024, Trepça became the first Kosovan club to achieve a win in the BCL Qualifiers by defeating the Cypriot champion Keravnos but lost against the Czech champion Nymburk in the next round.

In the 2010–11 season three clubs (Trepça, Mitrovica, Bambi) from Mitrovicë played in the Superleague which also never occurred before.

== Handball ==
The main team is KH Trepça. They won the Kosovar Superliga in 1994 and 2001. In addition to that, Trepça won the Kosovar Cup in 1994, 2002 and 2023. KHF Trepça and KHF Ibri are the two women handball clubs.

== Supporters ==
Torcida Mitrovicë
- Established: 20 March 1984; 42 years ago
- Arena: Adem Jashari Olympic Stadium, Minatori Sports Hall
- Location: Mitrovica, Kosovo
- Team colors: Green and black
- Affiliation: (Albania) Tifozat Kuq e Zi

Trepça's main supporters are Torcida Mitrovicë. They were officially founded by Shefqet Begu (also known as Qeti) on 20 March 1984. Torcida Mitrovicë are considered to be the oldest Albanian ultras.

== Infrastructure ==
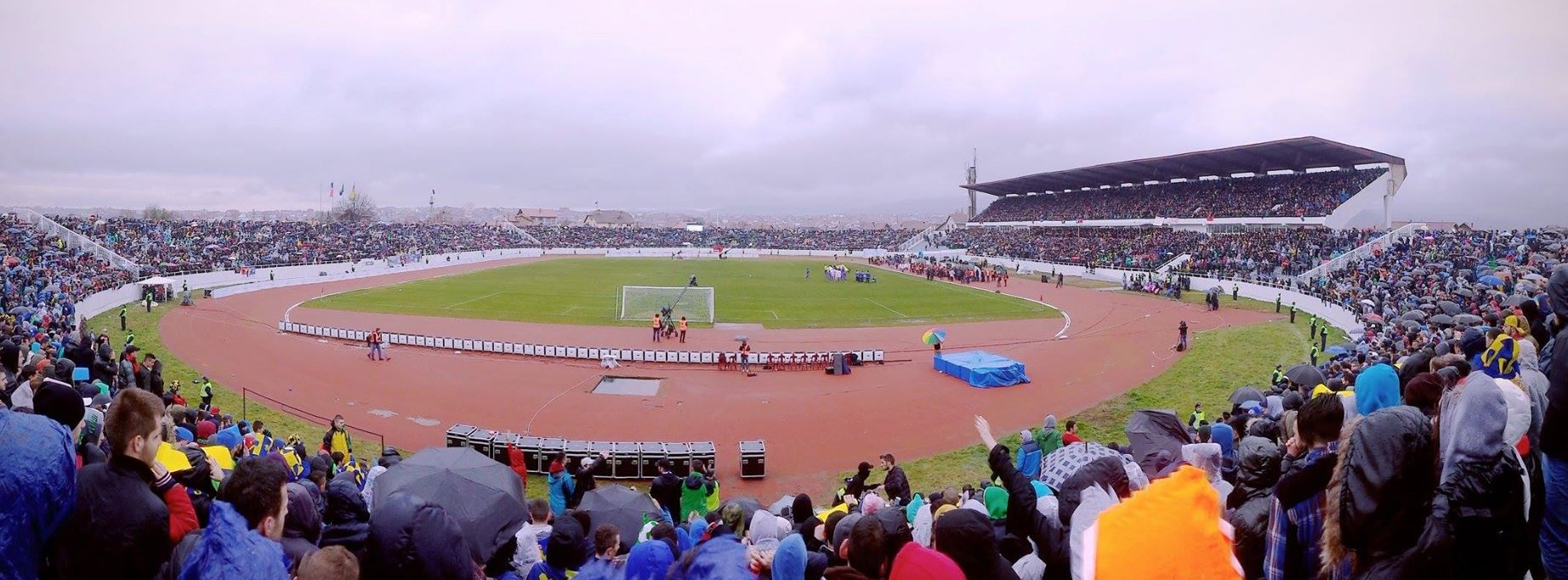
View of Adem Jashari Stadium

The Adem Jashari Olympic Stadium is the home ground of KF Trepça and also of the Kosovo national football team for selected matches. With a capacity of 28,500, it is the biggest stadium in the country. Another stadium is the Riza Lushta Stadium.

The Minatori Sports Hall serves multi–use sports hall and has a capacity for 4,500.

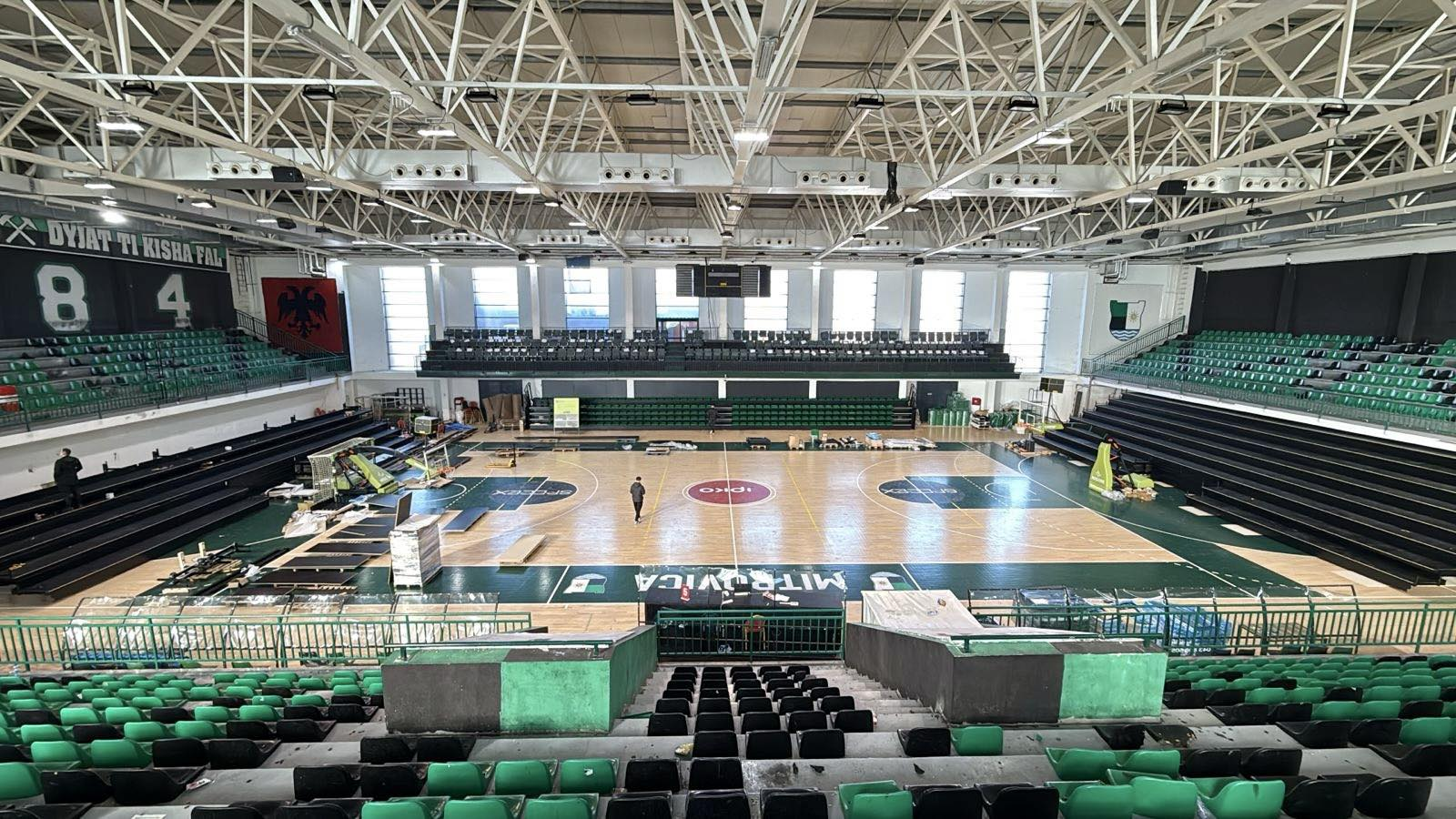
View of Minatori
