= Blerim Mazreku =

Albanian basketball player

Personal information
- Born: October 24, 1981 (age 45) Suva Reka, SFR Yugoslavia (modern Kosovo)
- Listed height: 6 ft 9 in (2.06 m)
- Listed weight: 233 lb (106 kg)

Career information
- Playing career: 2001–2016
- Position: Power forward / center

Career history
- 2001–2002: Ylli
- 2002–2003: Mabetex
- 2004: Ylli
- 2004–2006: Mabetex
- 2006–2007: Sigal Prishtina
- 2007–2008: Akropol BBK
- 2008–2009: Sigal Prishtina
- 2009–2010: Bashkimi
- 2010–2013: Peja
- 2013–2016: Sigal Prishtina

Career highlights
- 6× Kosovo Superleague champion (2005, 2007, 2009, 2013, 2014, 2015); 4× Kosovo Cup winner (2007, 2009, 2013, 2014); 2× Kosovo Supercup winner (2005, 2014); Balkan League champion (2015)

Blerim Mazreku (born 24 October 1981) is a Kosovan former professional basketball player who last played for Sigal Prishtina of the Kosovo Basketball Superleague. He was born in Therande in Kosovo and also started the career with the local club KB Ylli team. Most of the time, he played for Sigal Prishtina where he won 4x Kosovo Superleagues, 2x Kosovo Cups, 1x Kosovo Supercup and one time Balkan League. Mazreku also played for Peja, Bashkimi and for Mabetex.

Mazreku was a member of the Kosovo national basketball team.

== Professional career ==
=== 2007–08 ===
Blerim Mazreku played for Akkropol BBK of the Swedish Basketball League during 2007–08.

=== 2013–14 ===
Blerim Mazreku played with Sigal Prishtina in Kosovo Basketball Superleague and also in Balkan League. In the Kosovo Superleague he averaged with 14.3 points, 5.6 rebounds and 2.0 blocks per game in 26 games played. And in the BIBL, he averaged with 10.4 points, 4.9 rebounds and 1.3 blocks per game in 18 games played. In this season Mazreku won the Kosovo Superleague and the Supercup of Kosovo.

=== 2014–15 ===
In this season Mazreku also played with Sigal Prishtina in the Kosovo Superleague and in the Balkan League. Mazreku averaged 13.6 points, 5.0 rebounds and 1.8 assists per game in 24 games played in the Kosovo Basketball Superleague. And in the BIBL, he averaged 7.1 points, 2.6 rebounds and 1.2 blocks per game in 14 games played. Mazreku with his team in this season won Kosovo Basketball Superleague, Kosovo Cup and also Balkan League for the first time in history.
