= Musab Malaj =

Kosovan basketball player

No. 4 – Ylli
- Position: Point guard
- League: Kosovo Basketball Superleague

Personal information
- Born: 17 November 1996 (age 29) Mitrovicë, Kosovo, FR Yugoslavia
- Listed height: 1.85 m (6 ft 1 in)
- Listed weight: 75 kg (165 lb)

Career information
- NBA draft: 2018: undrafted
- Playing career: 2014–present

Career history
- 2014–2016: Trepça
- 2016–2017: Vëllaznimi
- 2017–2018: Trepça
- 2018: Bora
- 2018–2019: Lipjani
- 2019–2021: Bashkimi
- 2021–2022: Rahoveci
- 2022–2023: Trepça
- 2023: Prizreni
- 2023–2026: Peja
- 2025: →Bora
- 2026–present: Ylli

Career highlights
- Kosovo Cup winner (2023)

Musab Malaj or Musab Mala (born 17 November 1996) is a Kosovan professional basketball player for Ylli of the Kosovo Basketball Superleague. He is part of the Kosovo national team.

== Professional career ==
=== Lipjani (2018–2019) ===
Malaj averaged 16 points, 4 assists and 4 rebounds per game for Lipjani in the 2018–19 season.

=== Bashkimi (2019–2021) ===
On September 11, 2019, Malaj signed for Bashkimi of the Kosovo Superleague.

=== Rahoveci (2021–2022) ===
From 2021 until 2022, Malaj played for Rahoveci of the Kosovo Superleague and Liga Unike.

=== Trepça (2022–2023) ===
On December 12, 2022, Malaj signed for Trepça. He won the Kosovo Cup with Trepça in 2023.

=== Prizreni (2023) ===
On July 16, 2023, Malaj signed for Proton Cable Prizreni.

=== Peja (2023–2025) ===
On December 24, 2023, Malaj signed for Peja of the Kosovo Superleague and Liga Unike.

== National team career ==
Musab Malaj is part of the Kosovan national team since 2021.

== Honours ==
=== Trepça ===
- Kosovo Cup (2023)
