= Arben Krasniqi =

Kosovan basketball coach

Free Agent
- League: Kosovo Superleague

Personal information
- Born: 29 April 1974 (age 52) Pristina, Yugoslavia
- Listed height: 6 ft 8 in (2.03 m)
- Listed weight: 208 lb (94 kg)
- Coaching career: 2005–present

Career history

Coaching
- 2005–2013: Prishtina
- 2014: RTV21
- 2014–2015: Al-Hilal
- 2015–2016: Kosovo
- 2018–2019: Golden Eagle Ylli
- 2022–2024: Bora

Career highlights
- As head coach: 6x Kosovo Superleague Champion (2006, 2007, 2008, 2009, 2010, 2011); 7x Kosovo Cup winner (2005, 2006, 2007, 2008, 2009, 2010, 2013); 2x Kosovo Supercup winner (2012, 2013); Kosovo First League champion (2023)

Arben Krasniqi (born 29 March 1974) is a Kosovan professional basketball head coach, who last coached Bora of the Kosovo Superleague, and a former basketball player. He is generally considered one of the best Kosovan coaches ever, having won six Kosovan League titles, seven Kosovo Cups and two Kosovo Supercup with Prishtina.

== Coaching career ==
From 2005 until 2013, Krasniqi was the head coach of Prishtina with whom he won many domestic titles.

From 2014 until 2015, he was the head coach of Al-Hilal of the Saudi Basketball League.

In 2015, Krasniqi was appointed as the head coach of Kosovo.
