= Gazmend Sinani =

Kosovo Albanian basketball player

Personal information
- Born: 22 June 1991 Pristina, SR Serbia, SFR Yugoslavia
- Died: 23 June 2018 (aged 27) Gjakova, Kosovo
- Listed height: 6 ft 9 in (2.06 m)

Career information
- NBA draft: 2013: undrafted
- Playing career: 2008–2018
- Position: Center
- Number: 15

Career history
- 2008–2011: Fenerbahçe
- 2011: Sigal Prishtina
- 2011–2012: Malbas
- 2012–2015: Helsingborg
- 2015–2016: Sigal Prishtina
- 2016: Bashkimi Prizren
- 2016–2017: Muğla Ormanspor
- 2017–2018: Rahoveci
- 2018: Leeds Force

Career highlights
- Kosovo Superleague champion (2016); Kosovo Cup winner (2016); Balkan League champion (2016)

Gazmend Sinani (Turkish: Aydın Okçu; 22 June 1991 – 23 June 2018) was a Kosovan professional basketball player who last played as a center for Leeds Force and the Kosovo national team.

== Early life ==
Sinani was born in Pristina, SFR Yugoslavia to Kosovo Albanian parents from Podujevë and he carried Kosovan and Turkish passports.

== Professional career ==
=== Return to Sigal Prishtina ===
Last season with Kosovo Basketball Superleague club Sigal Prishtina, where he won three trophies as winner of Kosovo Basketball Superleague, winner of Kosovo Cup and the winner of Balkan League. In the local league he averaged 6.0 points and 5.6 rebounds while in BIBL he had 1.3 points and 2.3 rebounds.

=== Bashkimi Prizren ===
On 11 September 2016, Sinani joined Kosovo Basketball Superleague side Bashkimi Prizren.

=== Muğla Ormanspor ===
On 3 November 2016, Sinani joined Turkish Basketball First League side Muğla Ormanspor.

=== Rahoveci ===
On 29 November 2017, Sinani joined Kosovo Basketball Superleague side Rahoveci.

=== Leeds Force ===
On 26 January 2018, Sinani moved for the first time outside the Balkans and joined British Basketball League side Leeds Force and signed a contract to end of 2017–18 season.

== International career ==
Sinani was one of the first players of Kosovo. On 31 August 2016, he made his official debut with Kosovo in a EuroBasket 2017 qualification match against Slovenia.

== Death ==
On 23 June 2018, one day after his 27th birthday, Sinani suffered serious injuries in a car accident in the early hours in Gjakova, which also injured three other players of Kosovo national team: Altin Morina, Fisnik Rugova and Granit Rugova, along with physiotherapist Kujtim Shala. Sinani died as a result of his injuries, but all others in the accident survived.
