= Amin Hot =

Kosovan basketball player

No. 34 – Bora
- Position: Shooting guard
- League: Kosovo Basketball Superleague

Personal information
- Born: 27 March 1992 (age 34) Rožaje, FR Yugoslavia
- Listed height: 1.95 m (6 ft 5 in)
- Listed weight: 86 kg (190 lb)

Career information
- NBA draft: 2014: undrafted
- Playing career: 2011–present

Career history
- 2011–2012: Bosna Royal
- 2012–2013: Vogošća
- 2013–2014: Apollon Patras
- 2014–2015: Ibar
- 2015–2016: Enosis Neon Paralimni
- 2016–2017: BC Balkan
- 2017–2018: MAFC
- 2018–2019: Ibar
- 2019–2020: Patrioti Levice
- 2020–2021: Ibar
- 2021–2024: Trepça
- 2024–2025: Peja
- 2025–present: Bora

Career highlights
- Kosovo Superleague champion (2024); Liga Unike champion (2024); 3× Kosovo Cup winner (2022, 2023, 2024)

Amin Hot (born 27 March 1992) is a Montenegrin professional basketball player for Bora of the Kosovo Superleague. He is a 1.95 m tall shooting guard. Born in Rožaje, Montenegro, he represents Kosovo.

== Professional career ==
=== Apollon Patras (2013–2014) ===
On 5 September 2013, Hot signed for Apollon Patras of the Greek Basket League.

=== Return to KK Ibar (2020–2021) ===
Hot returned to his hometown club KK Ibar on 16 November 2020.

=== Trepça (2021–2024) ===
On 1 July 2021, Hot signed for Trepça of the Kosovo Basketball Superleague. He helped Trepça to win the Kosovo Cup after one decade by recording 15 points, 8 rebounds and 7 assists against Bashkimi.

== International career ==
=== Montenegro ===
Hot represented the Montenegro men's national under-18 basketball team in the 2010 European Championship Division B.

=== Kosovo ===
Hot was part of the Kosovan national team in the EuroBasket 2025 qualification in the game against Denmark.
