= Arian Tahiri =

Kosovan politician and former basketball player

- Arian Tahiri in 2026

Deputy mayor of South Mitrovica
- In office 26 November 2021 – 12 December 2025
- Succeeded by: Enis Osmani

Personal details
- Born: Arian Enver Tahiri; 3 December 1993 (age 32) Stantërg, Mitrovicë, FR Yugoslavia (modern Kosovo)
- Party: Democratic Party of Kosovo
- Children: 2
- Basketball career

Personal information
- Listed height: 6 ft 3 in (1.91 m)

Career information
- NBA draft: 2015: undrafted
- Playing career: 2009–2019

Career history
- 2009–2016: Trepça
- 2016–2017: Bashkimi
- 2017–2018: Ylli
- 2018–2019: Trepça

Career highlights
- Kosovo League champion (2012); Kosovo Cup winner (2012)

Arian Tahiri (born 3 December 1993) is Kosovan politician and a former professional basketball player. Since 2026, he is a member of the Assembly of the Republic of Kosovo.

== Politician ==
In 2021, he was appointed as the deputy mayor of Mitrovica by Bedri Hamza. He was a candidate for the 2025 Kosovan local elections in Mitrovica.

== Electoral record ==
=== Local (Mitrovica) ===
Mayoral results
Candidate	Party	First round		Second round	
Candidate	Party	Votes	%	Votes	%
Faton Peci	Vetëvendosje; Guxo	15,830	47.94	18,235	53.67
Arian Tahiri	Democratic Party of Kosovo	15,708	47.57	15,743	46.33
Gëzim Plakolli	Democratic League of Kosovo	1,225	3.71		
Qazim Nimani	Alliance for the Future of Kosovo	255	0.77		
Total		33,018	100.00	33,978	100.00
