= Kevin Bracy-Davis =

American basketball player (born 1995)

No. 2 – Trepça
- Position: Small forward / power forward
- League: Kosovo Basketball Superleague

Personal information
- Born: January 23, 1995 (age 31) Cincinnati, Ohio, U.S.
- Listed height: 6 ft 7 in (2.01 m)
- Listed weight: 210 lb (95 kg)

Career information
- High school: Western Hills (Cincinnati, Ohio)
- College: Davis & Elkins (2013–2017)
- NBA draft: 2017: undrafted
- Playing career: 2017–present

Career history
- 2017: Leones de Quilpué
- 2017: Ciudad de Ponferrada
- 2018: Korihait
- 2018–2019: Rethymno Cretan Kings
- 2019: Kataja
- 2019: Artland Dragons
- 2019–2020: Qatar SC
- 2020: Saskatchewan Rattlers
- 2020–2021: Ura
- 2021–2022: Caen Basket Calvados
- 2022–2023: Klosterneuburg Dukes
- 2023–2024: Trepça
- 2024: Dijlah
- 2024–2025: Hapoel HaEmek
- 2025–2026: Pelister
- 2026–present: Trepça

Career highlights
- Kosovo Superleague champion (2024); Liga Unike champion (2024); Kosovo Cup (2024); Kosovo Supercup winner (2023); Kosovo Supercup MVP (2023); All-GMAC Player of the Year (2017); 2x First-team All-GMAC (2016, 2017)

Kevin Bracy-Davis (born January 23, 1995) is an American professional basketball player for Trepça of the Kosovo Basketball Superleague. Standing at 2.01 m (6 ft 7 in), he plays the Small forward and the power forward positions. After playing four years of college basketball at Davis & Elkins College, Bracy-Davis entered the 2017 NBA draft, but he was not selected in the draft's two rounds.

== High school career ==
Bracy-Davis played high school basketball at Western Hills High School in Cincinnati, Ohio. He averaged 18 points, 11 rebounds, four assists, three blocks and 1.5 steals and he earned first team all-league selection as a senior.

== College career ==
As a freshman at Davis & Elkins College, he played in all 30 games with 12 starts, averaging 8.0 points per game. During the following seasons, his numbers were increased and he was named twice to the first-team all GMAC. As a senior, he was also named as the Player of the Year.

== Professional career ==
After going undrafted in the 2017 NBA draft, Bracy-Davis joined Leones de Quilpué of the Chilean League. On October, he left Leones de Quilpué and joined CDP Ponferrada in Spain. On January, he joined Korihait of the Korisliiga.

On June 20, 2018, he joined Rethymno Cretan Kings of the Greek Basket League.

On July 14, 2023, he signed for Trepça of the Kosovo Basketball Superleague.
