= Bujar Loci =

Kosovan basketball player and coach

Grapeland
- League: Kosovo Superleague

Personal information
- Born: 5 June 1969 (age 57) Peja, Yugoslavia
- Coaching career: 2005–present

Career history

Playing
- 1993–2000: Peja

Coaching
- 2005: Kosovo
- 2007–2011: Peja
- 2012–2014: Peja (assistant)
- 2019: Prishtina
- 2019–2021: Rahoveci
- 2021–2023: KBF Penza
- 2023–2024: Kosovo (assistant)
- 2024–2026: Grapeland/Rahoveci 029
- 2025–present: Kosovo

Career highlights
- As player: 3× Kosovo League champion (1994–1996); 3x Kosovo Cup winner (1994, 1995, 1997); Kosovo Supercup winner (1997); As head coach: Kosovo Cup winner (2011); Kosovo Supercup winner (2019); Kosovo First League champion (2025)

Bujar Loci (born 5 June 1969) is a Kosovan professional basketball head coach for Grapeland of the Kosovo Basketball Superleague and a former basketball player.

== Playing career ==
Loci played for Peja of which he was one of the founding members.

== Coaching career ==
In 2005, the Kosovo national team, coached by Loci, participated in a friendly tournament in Alexandria where they played against Egypt and Romania.

In 2025, he was appointed once again as the head coach of Kosovo national team.
