= Ilir Selmani =

Kosovar basketball player and coach

Trepça
- Title: Assistant coach
- League: Kosovo Superleague

Personal information
- Born: 9 January 1978 (age 48) Kosovska Mitrovica, SFR Yugoslavia
- Listed height: 6 ft 2.70 in (1.90 m)
- Listed weight: 199 lb (90 kg)

Career information
- Playing career: 1999–2011
- Position: Guard
- Coaching career: 2011–present

Career history

Playing
- 1999–2011: Trepça

Coaching
- 2011–2012: Trepça
- 2015: Kosovo men's U-20 team
- 2016: Trepça
- 2017–2019: Trepça
- 2018–2019: Kosovo (assistant coach)
- 2022–2023: Kosovo men’s U-18 team
- 2023: Trepça (caretaker)
- 2023–2024: Kosovo (assistant coach)

Career highlights
- As a player: Kosovo Cup winner (2004); 2x Kosovo Superleague (2000, 2001)

Ilir Selmani (born 9 January 1978) is a Kosovar basketball coach and former player. He was the head coach of KB Trepça of the Kosovo Basketball Superleague and was an assistant coach to the Kosovo men's national basketball team.

== Professional playing career ==
Ilir Selmani started his career at his hometown club Trepça. He played his entire career for Trepça in the Kosovo Basketball Superleague. He won the Kosovo Basketball Superleague in 2001 and the Kosovo Cup in 2004.

== Coaching career ==
He was the head coach of KB Trepça in 2012, 2016, 2017 and 2019. During the finals of the Kosovo Basketball Superleague in 2023 Trepça’s head coach Engin Gençoglu was sacked. Therefore, Ilir Selmani took care of the squad but failed to win the finals. Furthermore, he is active as a scout for young players in the Trepça academy.

== National team coaching career ==
In 2015 he was hired as the head coach of the Kosovo men's U-20 team. In 2018 he became the assistant coach of the Kosovo men's national basketball team until 2019. In 2023, Rami Hadar named him as an assistant coach for the Kosovo men's national basketball team.
