= Andin Rashica =

Kosovan basketball coach

Büyükçekmece
- Position: Assistant coach
- League: Türkiye Basketbol Ligi

Personal information
- Born: 19 September 1990 (age 36) Pristina, SFR Yugoslavia
- Coaching career: 2006–present

Career history

Coaching
- 2006–2013: Prishtina (assistant)
- 2013–2014: RTV21
- 2015–2024: Prishtina (assistant)
- 2015–present: Kosovo (assistant)
- 2024–2025: Manisa (assistant)
- 2025–present: Kosovo U20
- 2025–present: Büyükçekmece (assistant)

Career highlights
- As head coach: Kosovo Cup winner (2018); Kosovo Supercup winner (2020); As assistant coach: 2× Balkan League champion (2016, 2024); 9× Kosovo League champion (2006-2011, 2016, 2017, 2019); 10× Kosovo Cup winner (2006-2010, 2013, 2016, 2017, 2019, 2021); 4× Kosovo Supercup winner (2013, 2018, 2019, 2022)

Andin Rashica (born 19 September 1990) is a professional basketball coach from Kosovo.

== Coaching career ==
Rashica began his coaching career with Sigal Prishtina, where he was part of the coaching staff from 2006 to 2013. On 2 February 2013, at the age of 23, he was appointed head coach of KB RTV21, becoming the youngest coach to lead a professional basketball club in Kosovo.

=== KB Prishtina (2015–2024) ===
On 20 August 2015, Rashica returned to Sigal Prishtina as an assistant coach and occasionally serving as interim head coach. On 11 January 2018, he was appointed head coach of Sigal Prishtina, later winning the Kosovo Cup with a roster of all local players. At 27, he became the youngest coach to win the competition. He returned as head coach on 10 August 2020 and won the Kosovo Super Cup again with an all local players.

=== Manisa Basket (2024–2025) ===
On 10 June 2024, Rashica was appointed assistant coach of Manisa Basket, competing in the Turkish Basketball Super League and Basketball Champions League. Following the dismissal of head coach Ozan Bulkaz, Rashica took charge of the team for a friendly match against Tofaş. He subsequently continued on the coaching staff under Ertuğ Tuzcukaya. His tenure with Manisa Basket ended after he was unable to continue with the team due to documentation and registration issues.

=== Büyükçekmece Basketbol (2025–present) ===
On 28 August 2025, Rashica joined Büyükçekmece Basketbol as an assistant coach, reuniting with Ozan Bulkaz and returning to the Turkish Basketbol Süper Ligi. Following Bulkaz's departure during the season, he continued to work under Faruk Beşok, and later under Halil Üner, who took charge in March 2026. Büyükçekmece finished the season in 16th place and was relegated to the Turkish First League.

== National team coaching career ==
Rashica was an assistant coach of the Kosovo national basketball team from the first official matches after admission to FIBA at EuroBasket 2017 qualification, 2019 FIBA Basketball World Cup qualification and EuroBasket 2022 qualification. In 2023 he returns to the National Team to participate in the Pre-Qualifiers of EuroBasket 2025 qualification and 2027 FIBA Basketball World Cup qualification. In March 2025, he was hired as the head coach of the Kosovo U20.
