= Mikaile Tmušić =

Kosovan basketball player

No. 11 – Trepça
- Position: Shooting guard
- League: Kosovo Basketball Superleague

Personal information
- Born: 6 January 1993 (age 33) Peja, FR Yugoslavia (present-day Kosovo)
- Listed height: 1.89 m (6 ft 2 in)
- Listed weight: 90 kg (198 lb)

Career information
- NBA draft: 2015: undrafted
- Playing career: 2011–present

Career history
- 2011–2012: Arenys
- 2013–2016: Lovćen 1947
- 2016–2018: Bashkimi
- 2018–2020: Prishtina
- 2020–2021: Podgorica
- 2021–2022: Golden Eagle Ylli
- 2022–present: Trepça

Mikaile Tmušić (Cyrillic: Микаиле Тмушић, Albanian: Mikaile Tmusiq; born 6 January 1993) is a Kosovan professional basketball player for Trepça of the Kosovo Basketball Superleague and Liga Unike. He also plays for the Kosovan national basketball team.

== Honours ==
Kosovo Basketball Superleague

- Winners (5): 2018, 2019, 2022, 2024, 2025

Kosovo Cup

- Winners (4): 2019, 2023, 2024, 2025

Liga Unike

- Winners (2): 2022, 2024

Liga Unike Supercup

- Winners (2): 2021, 2022
