= Ersid Ljuca =

Kosovo Albanian basketball player

Personal information
- Born: May 10, 1981 (age 45) Bijelo Polje, SR Montenegro, SFR Yugoslavia
- Listed height: 6 ft 11 in (2.11 m)
- Listed weight: 255 lb (116 kg)

Career information
- NBA draft: 2003: undrafted
- Playing career: 1998–2016
- Position: Center

Career history
- 1998–2002: Lovćen
- 2002: Tina Time
- 2002–2003: Lovćen
- 2003–2004: Trepça
- 2004–2006: Prishtina
- 2006–2007: Ohud Medina
- 2008: Dinamo București
- 2008–2009: Rabotnički
- 2009: Peja
- 2009–2010: Anibal Zahle
- 2010: Kakanj
- 2010–2011: Kaysoun
- 2011–2012: Étoile du Sahel
- 2012: Prishtina
- 2012: Hoops Club
- 2013–2014: Peja
- 2014–2015: Jedinstvo
- 2015: Étoile du Sahel
- 2016: Strsljen

Career highlights
- 2× Kosovo Superleague champion (2006, 2013); 3× Kosovo Cup winner (2004, 2005, 2006)

Ersid Ljuca (Albanian: Ersid Lucaj) is a former Kosovan-Albanian professional basketball player. He was born in Bijelo Polje in Montenegro into an Albanian family and represented Albania and Kosovo.

== Professional career ==
In October 2014, Ljuca signed for Jedinstvo of the Montenegrin Basketball League.

On 11 January 2015, Ljuca signed for the Tunisian club Étoile Sportive du Sahel of the Championnat Pro A.

== International career ==
Ljuca was part of the Albania national team during the 2009 Mediterranean games. He played for Albania from 2006 until 2013 and for Kosovo in 2015.
