= Muhamed Thaçi =

Macedonian-Kosovan coach and former basketball player

Personal information
- Born: 30 April 1981 (age 45) Skopje

Career information
- Playing career: 1998–2011
- Coaching career: 2017–present

Career history

Playing
- 1998–1999: MZT Skopje
- 1999–2001: Vardar
- 2001–2002: MEB Prishtina
- 2002–2003: Mabetex
- 2003–2004: Dukagjini Peja
- 2004–2005: Mabetex
- 2005: Drita
- 2005: Alba Fehérvár
- 2006: Peja
- 2007: Stjarnan
- 2007–2008: MZT Skopje
- 2008–2009: Ormanspor Genclik Ankara
- 2009: MZT Skopje
- 2009–2010: Ormanspor Genclik Ankara
- 2010: Lirija
- 2010–2011: Trepça

Coaching
- 2017–2019: Hapoel Be'eri
- 2019–2021: Dinamo Tbilisi
- 2022: Rahoveci
- 2023: Maccabi Haifa (women's team)
- 2023–2025: Elitzur Ramla

Muhamed Thaçi (born 30 April 1981), known by his nickname Mujo Thaçi, is a Macedonian-Kosovan Basketball Coach and former professional basketball Swingman who last played for KB Trepça in the Kosovo Basketball Superleague.

== Professional career ==
In October 2007, Thaçi signed with Úrvalsdeild karla club Stjarnan. He was released by the club in November the same year. In four games, he averaged 15.5 points per game while making 47.5% of his three point shots.

== Coaching career ==
=== Dinamo Tbilisi (2019–2021) ===
On August 26, 2019, Thaçi became the head coach of Dinamo Tbilisi of the Georgian Superliga.

=== Rahoveci (2022) ===
On August 13, 2022, Thaçi became the head coach of Rahoveci of the Kosovo Superleague.

== National team career ==
Thaçi was part of the Kosovo national team in a tournament in Alexandria in 2005 where he played against Egypt and Romania.
