= 2013–14 Kosovo Basketball Superleague =

2013-14 ETC Superliga
- Duration: September 30, 2014 – April 29, 2015
- Games played: 224 regual season
- Teams: 8

Regular season
- Top seed: Sigal Prishtina
- Season MVP: (Kosovo) Dardan Berisha
- Promoted: Ylli
- Relegated: Drita

Finals
- Champions: Sigal Prishtina; 9th title
- Runners-up: Peja
- Finals MVP: (Kosovo) Dardan Berisha

Awards
- Defender o/t Year: (Albania) Gerti Shima

Statistical leaders
Points	(United States) Bryce CARTWRIGHT	34.6
Rebounds	(Albania) Endrit Hysenagolli	12.5
Assists	(Kosovo) Samir Shaptahu	10.6

Records
- Average attendance: 1050

The 2013–14 ETC Superliga was the 20th season of the Kosovo Basketball Superleague, also called ETC Superliga in its sponsored identity it's the highest professional basketball league in Kosovo.

The regular season started on 12 October 2013 and finished on 29 April 2014, after all teams had played 28 games. The 4 best ranked teams advanced to the play-off phase whilst KB Drita was relegated to the Liga e Parë e Kosoves ne Baskbetboll after finishing last in the league table.

The play-offs started on 1 May 2015 and finished on 14 May 2015, Sigal Prishtina won their 9th title by beating Peja 3:0 in a 3-game final.

== Regular season ==
Pos	Team	W	L	PCT	GP	Qualification or relegation
1	Sigal Prishtina	26	2	.929	28	
2	Peja	25	3	.893	28	
3	Bashkimi	17	11	.607	28	
4	Trepça	15	13	.536	28	
5	Besa	12	16	.429	28	
6	Vëllaznimi	9	19	.321	28	
7	Kastrioti	3	25	.107	28	
8	Drita	5	23	.179	28	

== Playoffs ==
Same as last year, the semi-finals were played in a best-of-four format.

Semifinals
1	Sigal Prishtina	2
4	Trepça	0
2	Peja	2
3	Bashkimi	1

Finals
1	Sigal Prishtina	3
2	Peja	0

2013–14 ETC Superliga Champions

Sigal Prishtina
9th title

== Awards ==
- MVP: (Kosovo) Dardan Berisha – Sigal Prishtina
- Finals MVP: (Kosovo) Dardan Berisha – Sigal Prishtina
- Foreigner MVP: (United States) Frederick House – KB Peja
- Coach of the Year: (North Macedonia) Marin Dokuzovski – Sigal Prishtina
