= Yll Kaçaniku =

Kosovan basketball player

Personal information
- Born: May 31, 1985 (age 41) Pristina, Kosovo, Yugoslavia
- Listed height: 6 ft 8 in (2.03 m)
- Listed weight: 218 lb (99 kg)

Career information
- NBA draft: 2007: undrafted
- Playing career: 2003–2019
- Position: Small forward

Career history
- 2003–2007: Tofaş
- 2007–2008: Antalya BB
- 2008–2009: Mersin BSK
- 2009–2010: Darüşşafaka
- 2010–2011: Karşıyaka Basket
- 2011–2012: Istanbulspor
- 2012–2013: Darüşşafaka
- 2013–2014: Pamukkale Üniversitesi
- 2014–2015: Uşak Sportif
- 2015: Prishtina
- 2016: Bashkimi
- 2016–2017: Ankara DSI
- 2017–2018: Samsunspor
- 2018–2019: Bornova Belediyespor

Yll Kaçaniku (Turkish: Ulug Kaçaniku; born May 31, 1985) is a Kosovan former professional basketball player who mostly played in Turkey. He was a member of the Kosovo national team.

== Career ==
=== Karşıyaka (2010–2011) ===
On July 6, 2010, Kaçaniku signed for Karşıyaka Basket of the Turkish Basketball League and FIBA EuroChallenge.

=== Uşak Sportif (2014–2015) ===
In 2014, Kaçaniku signed for Uşak Sportif of the Turkish Basketball League and FIBA EuroChallenge.

=== Prishtina (2015–2016) ===
On August 3, 2015, Kaçaniku signed for Prishtina of the Kosovo Superleague and the FIBA Europe Cup.

=== Bashkimi (2016) ===
On January 14, 2016, Kaçaniku signed for Bashkimi of the Kosovo Superleague.

=== Samsunspor (2017–2018) ===
On August 25, 2017, Kaçaniku signed for Samsunspor of the Turkish First League.

== National team career ==
Kaçaniku was part of the Kosovo national team during the 2016 Eurobasket qualifiers where he played six matches. His official debut with Kosovo came on 31 August 2016 in the EuroBasket 2017 qualification match against Slovenia.
