= Edmond Azemi =

Kosovan-Albanian basketball player

Personal information
- Born: 10 September 1980 (age 46) Doboj, SR Bosnia and Herzegovina, SFR Yugoslavia
- Listed height: 6 ft 7 in (2.01 m)
- Listed weight: 216 lb (98 kg)

Career information
- Playing career: 1999–2021
- Position: Shooting guard, small forward

Career history
- 1999–2005: Prishtina
- 2005–2006: →Valbona Tropojë
- 2006–2007: Prishtina
- 2006–2007: KR
- 2007: MZT Skopje
- 2008–2010: Prishtina
- 2010–2011: Liria
- 2011–2021: Prishtina

Career highlights
- 3x Kosovo Basketball Superleague MVP (2008–2010); 2x Kosovo Cup Finals MVP (2009,2010); 2x All-Kosovo Selected Team (2001, 2003); 2x Kosova League All-Star (2002, 2003); Icelandic League champion (2007)

Edmond "Edo" Azemi (born 10 September 1980) is a Kosovan former professional basketball player, who mostly played for Prishtina in the Kosovo Basketball Superleague and the Balkan International Basketball League. He is ethnically Albanian. Azemi is one of the most successful players in the history of Kosovan basketball. He started his career in Prishtina, and spent the majority of his career with Prishtina, winning 10 Kosovo League titles, 9 Kosovo Cups, 3 Kosovo Supercups and 2 Balkan Leagues.

Azemi has also been a member of the Kosovo national team from 2011. He was part of the Albanian national team from 2004 to 2010. Azemi also holds a Croatian passport.

== Personal ==
He was born in Doboj, SFR Yugoslavia to Albanian father and Croatian mother. He spent his teen years in Pristina, Kosovo and also started the career in KB Prishtina where he made history. Now Edmond Azemi lives in Pristina, he is married to Elma Ibro and they have two children.

== Professional career ==
=== 2005-2010 season ===
In 2005–06 season, Edmond Azemi played in KB Valbona Tropoje in Albanian Basketball League and also in Eurocup Challenge where he was one of the best players of his team. He averaged with 9.0 points, 2.0 rebounds and 1.0 steals per game. Also in 2005–06 season he played with KB Prishtina where he averaged with 10.3 points and 2.6 assists per game. Then in 2006-07 he played for KR Basket in the Icelandic Úrvalsdeild and helped them win the national championship. For the season he averaged 9.1 points, 4.2 rebounds, 1.6 assists and 2.4 steals in 12 games played. From Iceland he returned in Kosovo at KB Prishtina to play just two seasons and to go to Macedonian basketball superleague at KB Liria team where he played 13 games with average - 12.2 points, 4.3 rebounds and 1.9 assists per game.

=== 2010-2015 seasons ===
From KK Lirija, Azemi returned again in KB Sigal Prishtina in 2010-11 where he won Kosovo Basketball Superleague, Kosovo Basketball Superleague MVP of 2010/11 season, and also the Kosovo Cup. In 2010/11 he averaged with very impressive stats: 22.4 points, 5.2 rebounds and 5.1 assists per game. In 2013/14 season Edmond Azemi with his team Sigal Prishtina played in Balkan International Basketball League for the first time in history. In the first season in BIBL Sigal Prishtina went to the final four of this league where they were organizers of this event. During this season of BIBL, Azemi averaged with 4.1 points and 1.8 rebounds in 16 games played. The 2014–15 season was one of the best in history not just for Azemi but also for KB Sigal Prishtina because in this season they won Balkan League for the first time and also Kosovo Superleague Trophy. In this winning season, Azemi averaged with 7.8 points, 4.2 rebounds and 2.1 assists per game in 17 games played.

== Honors ==
- 13x Kosovo Basketball Superleague champion (02,03,06,07,08,09,10,11,14,15,16,17,19)
- 13x Kosovo Cup winner (03,05,06,07,08,09,10,13,14,16,17,18,19)
- 4x Kosovo Supercup winner (2005, 2006, 2014, 2018)
- Icelandic League champion (2007)
- Balkan League champion (2015,2016)
