= Artan Mehmeti =

Kosovan basketball player

Personal information
- Born: 1 April 1975 (age 51) Mitrovicë, Kosovo, Yugoslavia
- Listed height: 5 ft 9 in (1.75 m)

Career information
- NBA draft: 1997: undrafted
- Playing career: 1992–2008
- Position: Point guard

Career history
- 1992–1995: Trepça
- 1995–1996: Shkëndija
- 1996–1998: Drita
- 1998–2000: Westminster Warriors
- 2000–2004: Trepça
- 2004–2006: Mabetex
- 2006–2007: Peja
- 2007–2008: Kosova Vushtrri

Career highlights
- 4× Kosovo League champion (1992, 1997, 2001, 2005); Kosovo Cup winner (2004); Kosovo League MVP (2001)

Artan Mehmeti (born 1 April 1975) is a Kosovan former professional basketball player who played for several clubs of the Kosovo Basketball Superleague. Mehmeti was one of the most successful Kosovan playmakers in the 1990s and at the beginning of the 21st century.

== Career ==
Mehmeti started his career with his hometown club Trepça in 1992. He won the Kosovo League in 1992 with Trepça. Mehmeti played for Shkëndija and Drita in 1995–1998. During the Kosovo War, Mehmeti played for the Westminster Warriors of the NBL. After the war, he returned to Trepça, winning the Kosovo Superleague in 2001. Mehmeti was selected the MVP of that season.

== National team career ==
Mehmeti was part of the Kosovo national team in a friendly tournament in Alexandria in 2005 with Egypt and Romania.

== Awards and accomplishments ==
- 4× Kosovo League champion (1992, 1997, 2001, 2005)
- Kosovo Cup winner (2004)
- Kosovo League MVP (2001)
