= Florian Miftari =

Kosovo Albanian basketball player

Sigal Prishtina
- Position: Director general

Personal information
- Born: June 4, 1981 (age 45) Pristina, SFR Yugoslavia
- Listed height: 6 ft 9 in (2.06 m)

Career information
- Playing career: 1996–2009

Career history
- 1996–1997: Prishtina
- 1997–2000: Beşiktaş
- 2000–2005: Prishtina
- 2005–2006: Mabetex
- 2006–2007: AS Prishtina
- 2007–2008: MZT Skopje
- 2008: Skallagrímur
- 2008–2009: Peja

Career highlights
- 3× Kosovo Superleague champion (2002, 2003, 2005); 2× Kosovo Cup winner (2002, 2003)

Florian Miftari is a former Kosovan-Albanian professional basketball player. He represented Albania and Kosovo. Currently he is the general director of Prishtina.

== Professional career ==
In 1997, he joined the Turkish club Beşiktaş where he stayed until 2000.

He returned to his hometown club Prishtina in 2000 and played there for five years. In 2005, he signed for local rival Mabetex.

He later played in North Macedonia and Iceland before ending his career in 2009 with Peja.
