= KB Mabetex =

Professional basketball club in Kosovo

- Leagues: Kosovo Superleague; Kosovo Cup
- Founded: 2001; 25 years ago
- Dissolved: 2006
- History: KB Siguria (2001); KB Mabetex (2001–2006); KB X Prishtina (2006–20??)
- Location: Pristina, Kosovo
- Ownership: Mabetex Group
- Championships: 1 National Championship
Home	Away

KB Mabetex was a professional basketball club based in Pristina, Kosovo. It was owned by Kosovan businessman Behgjet Pacolli and therefore named after his construction company.

== Honours ==
=== Domestic ===
Kosovo Superleague

- Winners (1): 2004–05
- Runners-up (2): 2002–03, 2005–06

== Notable players ==
Note: Flags indicate national team eligibility at FIBA-sanctioned events. Players may hold other non-FIBA nationalities not displayed.

Criteria

To appear in this section a player must have either:

- Set a club record or won an individual award while at the club
- Played at least one official international match for their national team at any time
- Played at least one official NBA match at any time.

- (Kosovo) Habib Ademi
- (Kosovo) Blerim Mazreku
- (Kosovo) Artan Mehmeti
- (Kosovo) Valentin Spaqi
- (Kosovo) Besim Tafilaj
- (Kosovo) (Albania) Florian Miftari
- (Kosovo) (Albania) Samir Shaptahu
- (Kosovo) (North Macedonia) Muhamed Thaçi
- (United States) Mario Bennett
- (United States) Malik Ausean Evans
- (United States) James Scott
- (United States) Kenneth Walker
