= 2025–26 Kosovo Basketball Superleague =

- Duration: 4 September 2025 – 20 May 2026
- Games played: 224 (regular season); 9–15 (Playoffs)
- Teams: 8
- TV partners: K-Sport; Art Sport

Finals
- Champions: Trepça
- Runners-up: Bashkimi
- Finals MVP: (Kosovo) Dardan Kapiti (Trepça)

Statistical leaders
Points	(United States) Jericole Hellems (Vëllaznimi)	20.8
Rebounds	(United Kingdom) Tajh Green (Peja)	8.2
Assists	(United States) Antwan Scott (Golden Eagle Ylli)	6.1

The 2025–26 Kosovo Basketball Superleague, also known as ProCredit Superliga, is the 32nd season of the Kosovo Basketball Superleague. The season started on 4 September 2025 and ended on 20 May 2026. Trepça won its seventh title.

== Teams ==
Rahoveci 029 has been promoted to the league after winning 2024–25 Kosovo Basketball First League.

== Venues and location ==
Kosovo Basketball Superleague – club locations

Team	City	Venue	Capacity
Bashkimi	Prizren	"Sezai Surroi" Spor Merkezi	2,500
Bora	Pristina	Pallati i Rinisë dhe Sporteve	1,800
Prishtina	Pristina	Pallati i Rinisë dhe Sporteve	1,800
Peja	Peja	Karagaq Sports Hall	3,000
Trepça	Mitrovica	Salla e sporteve Minatori	4,500
Golden Eagle Ylli	Suva Reka	Salla e sporteve "13 Qërshori"	1,800
Rahoveci 029	Rahovec	Mizahir Isma	4,000
Vëllaznimi	Gjakova	Palestra Sportive "Shani Nushi"	2,500
