= Jeronimo Šarin =

Croatian basketball player and coach

Prishtina
- Position: Head coach
- League: Kosovo Basketball Superleague

Personal information
- Born: 28 February 1974 (age 52) Šibenik, SR Croatia, SFR Yugoslavia
- Listed height: 1.97 m (6 ft 6 in)

Career information
- Playing career: 1991–2007
- Coaching career: 2010–present

Career history

Playing
- 1991–1999: Šibenik
- 1999–2000: Zagreb
- 2000: Altay Izmir
- 2000–2001: Unia Tarnów
- 2001–2003: Limburg United
- 2003–2005: Fürstenfeld Panthers
- 2005: PVSK Panthers
- 2005: Beauvais BC Oise
- 2005–2006: Orli Prostějov
- 2006: Antibes Sharks
- 2006–2007: Šibenik

Coaching
- 2010–2016: Šibenka
- 2016–2017: Prishtina
- 2017: Vllaznia
- 2017–2018: Antonin Sportif
- 2019: Bashkimi
- 2019–2020: Peja
- 2021–2023: Furnir
- 2024–2025: Vëllaznimi
- 2025–2026: Ylli
- 2026–present: Prishtina

Career highlights
- As head coach: Liga Unike champion (2025); Kosovo Superleague champion (2017); A-2 Liga champion (2013); Kosovo Cup winner (2017)

Jeronimo Šarin (born 28 February 1974) is a Croatian professional basketball coach and former player. He currently serves as the head coach for Prishtina of the Kosovo Basketball Superleague.
