= 2019–20 Kosovo Basketball Superleague =

- Duration: 28 September 2019 – 1 April 2020
- Teams: 9
- TV partner(s): Klan Kosova; Art Motion

The 2019–20 IP Superliga e Basketbollit was the 26th season of the Kosovo Basketball Superleague. It started on 28 September 2019. On 1 April 2020, the board of the Kosovo Basketball Federation (FBK) ended the season prematurely due to the COVID-19 pandemic. No champion was named.

== Teams ==
IP Superliga e Basketbollit – club locations

Team	City	Venue	Capacity
Bashkimi	Prizren	Palestra Sportive Sezair Surroi	3,000
Feronikeli	Drenas		
Golden Eagle Ylli	Suva Reka	Salla e sporteve "13 Qërshori"	1,800
Lipjani	Lipljan		
Peja	Peja	Karagaq Sports Hall	3,000
Ponte Prizreni	Prizren	Palestra Sportive Sezair Surroi	3,000
Rahoveci	Orahovac	Salla e Sporteve Rahovec	1,800
Trepça	Mitrovica	Salla e sporteve Minatori	2,800
Z-Mobile Prishtina	Pristina	Pallati i Rinisë dhe Sporteve	2,500

== Regular season ==
=== League table ===
Pos	Team	Pld	W	L	PF	PA	PD	Pts	Qualification or relegation
1	Sigal Prishtina	24	18	6	2235	1799	+436	42	Qualification to semifinals and Liga Unike
2	Rahoveci	24	17	7	2098	1811	+287	41	Qualification to semifinals and Liga Unike
3	Golden Eagle Ylli	24	16	8	2122	1991	+131	40	Qualification to quarterfinals and Liga Unike
4	Peja	24	15	9	2110	2003	+107	39	Qualification to quarterfinals and Liga Unike
5	Bashkimi	24	15	9	1971	1975	−4	39	Qualification to quarterfinals
6	Ponte Prizreni	24	13	11	2100	2073	+27	37	Qualification to quarterfinals
7	Trepça	24	7	17	1865	2006	−141	31	Qualification for relegation playoffs
8	Feronikeli	24	5	19	1945	2233	−288	29	Relegation to Kosovo Basketball First League
9	Lipjani	24	2	22	1851	2406	−555	26	Relegation to Kosovo Basketball First League

Updated to match(es) played on 7 March 2020. Source: IP Superliga

=== Results ===
Home \ Away	BAS	FER	YLL	LIP	PEJ	PON	RAH	PRI	TRE	BAS	FER	YLL	LIP	PEJ	PON	RAH	PRI	TRE
Bashkimi	—	91–93	69–85	107–57	75–67	82–73	85–81	95–89	80–65	—		89–93	64–83		101–92		89–82	
Feronikeli	83–106	—	82–97	89–84	89–95	93–101	75–72	70–119	61–84	66–82	—		62–88	91–98		72–104		
Golden Eagle Ylli	89–79	103–90	—	104–91	82–83	94–86	72–91	79–82	90–80		106–71	—		77–84		88–84		90–83
Lipjani	78–86	59–112	88–115	—	79–118	101–121	79–116	70–105	91–100			79–100	—		77–97		78–94	68–85
Peja	73–76	107–100	92–73	96–82	—	95–99	75–83	72–85	90–79	103–80			108–71	—		89–70	82–76	
Ponte Prizreni	81–86	100–92	78–73	91–78	70–78	—	92–88	72–88	88–78		96–83	80–88		96–92	—			91–86
Rahoveci	78–54	87–61	68–69	96–63	95–109	90–75	—	74–61	99–74	101–81			97–76		88–66	—	70–57	
Sigal Prishtina	120–59	102–69	92–84	141–75	104–60	100–76	87–94	—	105–71		86–82	93–83			91–76		—	71–54
Trepça	74–85	95–97	77–88	102–56	76–65	51–103	69–80	65–105	—	69–70	71–62			95–79		82–92		—

Updated to match(es) played on 7 March 2020. Source: IP Superliga
Legend: Blue = home team win; Red = away team win.

== Kosovan clubs in European competitions ==
Club	Competition	Progress
Sigal Prishtina	Champions League	First qualifying round
Sigal Prishtina	FIBA Europe Cup	Regular season
Rahoveci	FIBA Europe Cup	Qualifying round
