= Ersan Özseven =

Turkish basketball player (born 1983)

Personal information
- Born: August 23, 1983 (age 43) Mersin, Turkey
- Listed height: 6 ft 6 in (1.98 m)
- Listed weight: 201 lb (91 kg)
- Position: Small forward

Ersan Özseven (born August 23, 1983) is a retired Turkish professional basketball player who last played for KB RTV21 of the Kosovo Superleague.

He also played for Oyak Renault, Pinar KSK, Mersin BSB and Aliağa Petkim in Turkey.
