= 2011–12 Kosovo Basketball Superleague =

Basketball league

2011-12 BKT Superliga
- Duration: October 15, 2011 – June 6, 2012
- Games played: 224 regular season
- Teams: 8

Regular season
- Top seed: KB Trepça
- Season MVP: (Kosovo) Drilon Hajrizi
- Promoted: Drita
- Relegated: Kolegji Universiteti, Futura

Finals
- Champions: Trepça; 4th title
- Runners-up: Sigal Prishtina
- Finals MVP: (Kosovo) Drilon Hajrizi

Awards
- Defender o/t Year: (Kosovo) Edmond Azemi

Records
- Highest scoring: Trepça 122-59 Drita

The 2011–12 BKT Superliga was the 18th season of the Kosovo Basketball Superleague, also called BKT Superliga due to sponsorship reasons.

The regular season started on 15 October 2011 and finished on 22 April 2012, after all teams had played 28 games. The 6 best ranked teams advanced to the play-off phase whilst KB Futura relegated to the Kosovo Basketball First League and KB Kolegji Universiteti was dissolved. Even though KB Drita finished last, they stayed in the Kosovo Basketball Superleague.

The play-offs started on 2 May 2012 and finished on 6 June 2012, Trepça won their 4th title by beating Sigal Prishtina 3:2 in a 5-game final.

== Regular season ==
| Pos | Team | W | L | PCT | GP | Qualification or relegation |
|---|---|---|---|---|---|---|
| 1 | Sigal Prishtina | 25 | 3 | .893 | 28 | |
| 2 | Trepça | 25 | 3 | .893 | 28 | |
| 3 | Peja | 18 | 10 | .643 | 28 | |
| 4 | Bashkimi | 16 | 12 | .571 | 28 | |
| 5 | Kolegji Universiteti | 9 | 19 | .321 | 28 | |
| 6 | Kosova Vushtrri | 8 | 20 | .286 | 28 | |
| 7 | Futura | 6 | 22 | .214 | 28 | |
| 8 | Drita | 5 | 23 | .179 | 28 | |

== Playoffs ==
Semifinals
1 | Sigal Prishtina | 2
4 | Bashkimi | 0
2 | Trepça | 2
3 | Peja | 0

Finals
1 | Trepça | 3
2 | Sigal Prishtina | 2

2011–12 BKT Superliga Champions

Trepça
4th title

== Awards ==
- MVP: (Kosovo) Drilon Hajrizi – Trepça
- Finals MVP: (Kosovo) Drilon Hajrizi – Trepça
- Foreigner MVP: (United States) Jaleel Nelson – Trepça
- Coach of the Year: (Croatia) Neven Plantak – Trepça
