= Malik Ausean Evans =

American basketball player

Personal information
- Born: May 7, 1973 (age 53) Houston, Texas
- Listed height: 6 ft 8 in (2.03 m)
- Listed weight: 240 lb (109 kg)

Career information
- College: Vanderbilt University (1992–1996)
- NBA draft: 1996: undrafted
- Playing career: 1996–present
- Position: Forward

Career history
- 1997: New Hampshire Thunder Loons
- 1997–1998: Polonia Warszawa
- 1998–1999: Kumanovo
- 1999–2000: Básquet Coruña
- 2000–2001: CI Rosalía de Castro
- 2001–2002: Seoul Samsung Thunders
- 2002: Changwon LG Sakers
- 2002–2003: Cantabria Baloncesto
- 2003–2004: CB Aracena
- 2004–2005: Mabetex
- 2005–2006: Club La Unión
- 2007: Houston Red Storm

Career highlights
- Kosovo Basketball Superleague (2005)

Malik Ausean Evans (born July 5, 1973) is a retired American professional basketball player.
