= 2014–15 Kosovo Basketball Superleague =

2014–15 ETC Superliga
- Duration: October 12, 2014 – April 29, 2015
- Games played: 224 (regular season)
- Teams: 8

Regular season
- Top seed: Sigal Prishtina
- Season MVP: (Kosovo) Dardan Berisha
- Promoted: Kerasan Prishtina
- Relegated: KB Besa

Finals
- Champions: Sigal Prishtina; 10th title
- Runners-up: Peja
- Finals MVP: (Kosovo) Dardan Berisha

Awards
- Rookie o/t Year: (Kosovo) Korab Prekazi
- Defender o/t Year: (Bosnia and Herzegovina) Edin Bavcic

Statistical leaders
Points	(United States) Keith Gabriel	34.6
Rebounds	(United States) Mark Dawson	12.5
Assists	(Slovenia) Jan Močnik	10.6

Records
- Highest scoring: Peja 125-89 Kastrioti
- Average attendance: 1300

The 2014–15 ETC Superliga was the 21st season of the Kosovo Basketball Superleague, also called ETC Superliga in its sponsored identity it's the highest professional basketball league in Kosovo

The regular season started on 12 October 2014 and finished on 29 April 2015, after all teams had played 28 games. The 4 best ranked teams advanced to the play-off phase whilst KB Kastrioti was relegated to the Liga e Parë e Kosoves ne Baskbetboll after finishing last in the league table.

The play-offs started on 24 April 2015 and finished on 6 May 2015, Sigal Prishtina won their 10th title by beating Peja by an official decision from the BFK because in the game 3 of the final at the result 1-1 of the finals, Peja decided to leave the field for unexplained reasons. Therefore, Basketball Federation of Kosovo gave Sigal Prishtina the title by an official decision and KB Peja was relegated to the Liga e Parë and fined 10,000 euros. Also KB Besa, due to some issues with some documents from the previews season also got an penalty to be exclusion from the Superleague.

== Regular season ==
Pos	Team	W	L	PCT	GP	Qualification or relegation
1	Sigal Prishtina	26	2	.929	28	
2	Peja	25	3	.893	28	
3	Bashkimi	17	11	.607	28	
4	Ylli	15	13	.536	28	
5	Trepça	12	16	.429	28	
6	Vëllaznimi	9	19	.321	28	
7	Besa	5	23	.179	28	
8	Kastrioti	3	25	.107	28	

== Playoffs ==
Same as last year, the semi-finals were played in a best-of-four format.

Semifinals
1	Sigal Prishtina	3
4	Ylli	0
2	Peja	3
3	Bashkimi	1

Finals
1	Sigal Prishtina	3
2	Peja	0

2014–15 ETC Superliga Champions

Sigal Prishtina
10th title

== Awards ==
- MVP: (Kosovo) Dardan Berisha – Sigal Prishtina
- Finals MVP: (Kosovo) Dardan Berisha – Sigal Prishtina
- Foreigner MVP: (United States) Jordan Hulls – Sigal Prishtina
- Coach of the Year: (North Macedonia) Marjan Ilievski – Sigal Prishtina
