= Ferit Zekolli =

Kosovan basketball player

Sigal Prishtina
- Position: Vice-president
- League: Kosovo Superleague

Personal information
- Born: 19 February 1951 (age 75) Maxhunaj, Vushtrri, Yugoslavia
- Listed height: 6 ft 11 in (2.11 m)

Career information
- NBA draft: 1973: undrafted
- Playing career: 1970–1990

Career history

Playing
- 1970–1972: Trepça
- 1972–1975: Elektrokosova
- 1975: Metalac
- 1975–1977: Elektrokosova
- 1977–1978: Zadar
- 1978–1982: Prishtina
- 1982–1986: Trepça

Coaching
- 1992–1993: Trepça

Career highlights
- As head coach: Kosovo Superleague (1993) champion

Ferit Zekolli (born 19 February 1951) is a Kosovan former professional basketball player who played as a center. He is considered to be one of the best Albanian basketball players during his time. Since 2021, he is the vice-president of Prishtina.

== Early life ==
Zekolli was born in Maxhunaj, a village located in the municipality of Vushtrri, to ethnic Albanian parents. He finished his school in Mitrovicë where he started playing basketball for the first time.

== Career ==
=== Trepça ===
Zekolli started his professional career in 1970 with Trepça where he played until 1972.

=== Zadar ===
In 1977–78, Zekolli played for Zadar. He had to leave after just one season due to an injury.

== Coaching career ==
He was the head coach of Trepça in the 1992–93 season when Trepça won the first Superleague title.

== Politics ==
In 2017, Zekolli became a member of the political party Vetëvendosje.
