= Granit Rugova =

Kosovan basketball player

Personal information
- Born: November 13, 1985 (age 41) Pristina, SFR Yugoslavia
- Listed height: 6 ft 6 in (1.98 m)
- Listed weight: 198 lb (90 kg)

Career information
- College: Trinity Valley CC (2006–2008)
- NBA draft: 2008: undrafted
- Playing career: 2008–2018
- Position: Shooting guard
- Number: 9

Career history
- 2008–2015: Sigal Prishtina
- 2015–2016: Bashkimi
- 2016–2018: Sigal Prishtina

Granit Rugova (born November 13, 1985) is a Kosovan former professional basketball player and was a member of the Kosovo national team.

== Career ==
Rugova started his career in Sigal Prishtina and played there until 2005, at which time he left to play for Trinity Valley Community College in Athens, Texas, United States.

In 2008, he came back to Sigal Prishtina to play there until 2013 when he had an injury that left him out of the court for almost 2 years. On August 10, 2015, he signed a one-year contract for KB Bashkimi. In August 2016, Rugova signed a two-year contract for Sigal Prishtina. On March 30, 2011, he scored a career-high 110 points against KB Mitrovica which is a record in Kosovo Basketball Superleague history.

== See also ==
- List of basketball players who have scored 100 points in a single game
