= KB RTV21 =

Professional basketball club in Kosovo

- Leagues: Siguria Superleague
- Founded: 2010
- Dissolved: 2014
- Arena: 1 Tetori Sport Arena (2,500 seats)
- Location: Pristina, Kosovo
- Team colors: Blue and orange
- Head coach: Arben Krasniqi
Home	Away

KB RTV21 was a former professional basketball team that played in the Siguria Superleague owned by media operator RTV21. RTV21 was founded in 2010 and played until 2014 when it was dissolved.

== Players ==
=== 2013–14 roster ===
KB RTV21 roster
Players	Coaches
Pos. / No. / Nat. / Name / Ht. / Wt. / Age	Head coach: (Kosovo) Andin Rashica; Legend: (C) Team captain; Injured

== Notable players ==
- (Kosovo) Leonard Mekaj
- (Kosovo) Besnik Podvorica
- (Kosovo) Samir Zekiqi
- (Kosovo) Urim Zenelaj
- (Turkey) Ersan Özseven
- (United States) Ryan White
