= James Scott (basketball) =

American basketball player (born 1972)

Personal information
- Born: June 30, 1972 (age 54) Paterson, New Jersey, U.S.
- Listed height: 6 ft 6 in (1.98 m)
- Listed weight: 180 lb (82 kg)

Career information
- High school: Eastside (Paterson, New Jersey)
- College: Spartanburg Methodist (1991–1993); St. John's (1993–1995)
- NBA draft: 1995: undrafted
- Playing career: 1995–2005
- Position: Small forward
- Number: 32

Career history
- 1995–1996: BCM Gravelines
- 1996: Miami Heat
- 1997: Oklahoma City Cavalry
- 1998–1999: Levallois Sporting Club
- 1999–2000: Olympique Antibes
- 2000–2001: ALM Évreux
- 2001–2002: Montpellier
- 2002–2003: Élan Chalon
- 2003–2004: Mabetex
- 2004–2005: Guaiqueríes de Margarita
- Stats at NBA.com
- Stats at Basketball Reference

James Lamont Scott (born June 30, 1972) in Paterson, New Jersey is an American former professional basketball player.

== High school career ==
Scott attended EastSide High School until 1991, where he played high school basketball. While he was in high school, he was named a McDonald's "All-American" Basketball Player.

== College career ==
After graduating from EastSide High School in 1991, James attended Spartanburg Methodist, from 1991 to 1993, where he played Junior College basketball. He was a two-time Junior College "All-American". While playing JUCO basketball, he averaged 23 points, 10 rebounds, and 10 assists per game. Scott, along with Larry Johnson, a now retired former NBA player, who competed with the Charlotte Hornets and the New York Knicks, are the only two freshman players in Junior College basketball history to be named two-time "All-Americans". He graduated from the school with an associate degree in Criminal Justice.

Scott then played NCAA Division I college basketball at St. John's University, with the St. John's Red Storm, from 1993 to 1995.

== Professional career ==
After not being selected in the 1995 NBA draft, Scott played overseas, with the French club BCM Gravelines, in the 1995–96 season. In the 1996–97 season, he played in eight games with the Miami Heat. He also played with clubs in Germany, Greece, Israel, Italy, Kosovo, Spain, Turkey, and Russia.
