= Maxhunaj =

Maxhunaj: Maxhunaj (Albanian); Novo Selo Mađunsko (Serbian)
- Village
- Location within Kosovo
- Coordinates: 42.783091°N 21.020681°E
- Location: Kosovo
- District: Mitrovicë
- Municipality: Vushtrri
- Elevation: 549 m (1,801 ft)

Population (2011)
  - Total: 2,035
- Time zone: UTC+1 (CET)
  - Summer (DST): UTC+2 (CEST)

Maxhunaj (Albanian: Maxhunaj, Serbian: Novo Selo Mađunsko) is a village in Vushtrri municipality, Kosovo.

== Notable people ==
- Ferit Zekolli, former basketball player who was born and raised in Maxhunaj
