= Samir Shaptahoviç =

Kosovo-Albanian retired basketball player (born 1981)

Personal information
- Born: August 2, 1981 (age 45) Bar, SR Montenegro, SFR Yugoslavia
- Listed height: 5 ft 9 in (1.75 m)
- Listed weight: 160 lb (73 kg)

Career information
- NBA draft: 2010: undrafted
- Playing career: 2001–2015
- Position: Point guard

Career history
- 2001–2004: Prishtina
- 2007–2008: Tindastóll
- 2008–2009: Mornar Bar
- 2011–2012: Bashkimi Prizren
- 2012–2015: Peja

Career highlights
- 4× Kosovo Superleague champion (2002, 2003, 2005, 2013); 3× Kosovo Cup winner (2002, 2003, 2011)

Samir Shaptahoviç (also known in Albanian as Samir Shaptahu) is a Kosovo-Albanian retired professional basketball player, who last played for Peja of the Kosovo Basketball Superleague. He was born in Bar Tivar in Montenegro in an Albanian family. He is considered one of the best players that the Kosovo Basketball Superleague ever had. He played in Kosovo Basketball Superleague and in Balkan International Basketball League.

He was a member of the Kosovo national basketball team, and also a member of the Albanian national basketball team.

He has won the Kosovo Basketball Superleague troph thricey, first with Prishtina in 2001–02, 2002-2003 and second with Peja in 2012–13 season. He has also played in Mornar Bar team and also in Mabetex Prishtina for one season. He is considered a basketball legend in Kosovo. At the end of the 2014–15 season, he announced his retirement from basketball in Kosovo.

== Professional career ==
=== 2014-15 season ===
Shaptahoviç played for KB Peja team in Kosovo Basketball Superleague and in Balkan International Basketball League. in 2014–15 season, Shaptahoviç was one of the best of his team. In Kosovo Superleague he averaged with very impressive stats: 20.1 points, 8.1 assists and 4.0 rebounds per game in 27 games played. And in BIBL he averaged with 17.3 points, 5.4 assists and 2.8 rebounds per game in 14 games played.
