= Vesko Pajović =

Serbian basketball player

- Pajović with Crvena zvezda in 1972

Personal information
- Born: 17 June 1953 Kosovska Mitrovica, FPR Yugoslavia
- Died: 27 January 2016 (aged 62) Belgrade, Serbia
- Listed height: 2.00 m (6 ft 7 in)

Career information
- NBA draft: 1975: undrafted
- Playing career: 1970–1975
- Number: 9

Career history
- 1970–1972: Trepça
- 1972–1975: Crvena zvezda

Vesko Pajović (Serbian Cyrillic: Веско Пајовић; 17 June 1953 – 27 January 2016) was a Serbian professional basketball player.

== Basketball career ==
Pajović started his basketball career playing with Trepça/Trepča from his hometown Kosovska Mitrovica.

In 1972, Pajović moved to Belgrade where he started to play for Crvena zvezda of the Yugoslav Federal League. During three seasons with the Zvezda, he played 84 games and averaged 0.9 points per game. Also he won two Yugoslav Cups. Together with Zoran Slavnić, Dragan Kapičić and Ljubodrag Simonović he was a member of the Crvena zvezda team that won the 1973–74 FIBA European Cup Winners' Cup. He did not play any game during the competition.

== Career achievements ==
- FIBA European Cup Winners' Cup winner: 1 (with Crvena zvezda: 1973–74).
- Yugoslav Cup winner: 2 (with Crvena zvezda: 1972–73, 1974–75).
