= Marjan Ilievski =

Macedonian basketball player and coach

Personal information
- Born: 7 December 1975 (age 50) Skopje, SR Macedonia, SFR Yugoslavia
- Listed height: 1.94 m (6 ft 4 in)

Career information
- Playing career: 1996–2002
- Position: Guard
- Coaching career: 2012–present

Career history

Playing
- 1996–1997: Nemetali Ogražden
- 1997–2000: Kumanovo
- 2000: MZT Skopje
- 2000–2001: Nikol Fert
- 2001–2002: Kumanovo

Coaching
- 2009–2010: Vardar Osiguruvanje (asst.coach)
- 2012–2014: Lirija
- 2014–2015: Sigal Prishtina
- 2016: Kožuv
- 2017–2019: Blokotehna
- 2019: AV Ohrid
- 2019–2020: KB Rahoveci
- 2020–2024: Pelister
- 2025: North Macedonia

Marjan Ilievski (born 7 December 1975) is a Macedonian professional basketball coach and former player. He is a former head coach of the North Macedonia national team.
