= 2010–11 Kosovo Basketball Superleague =

Basketball league

2010-11 BKT Superliga
- Duration: October 23, 2010 – June 5, 2011
- Games played: 224 regual season
- Teams: 8

Regular season
- Top seed: Prishtina
- Season MVP: (Kosovo) Granit Rugova
- Promoted: Mitrovica
- Relegated: Mitrovica

Finals
- Champions: Prishtina; 9th title
- Runners-up: Peja
- Finals MVP: (Kosovo) Granit Rugova

Records
- Biggest home win: Prishtina 160–51 Mitrovica

The 2010–11 Techno Market Superliga was the 17th season of the Kosovo Basketball Superleague, also called Market Techno Superleague in its sponsored identity it's the highest professional basketball league in Kosovo.

The regular season started on 23 October 2010 and finished on 30 April 2011, after all teams had played 28 games. The four best ranked teams advanced to the play-off phase whilst KB Mitrovica relegated to the Kosovo Basketball First League and KB Progres Bambi Mitrovica, an ethnic Serbian club, was dissolved after the playoffs.

The play-offs started on 14 May 2011 and finished on 5 June 2011, Prishtina won their 9th title by beating Peja 3:0 in a 5-game final.

== Regular season ==
Pos	Team	W	L	PCT	GP	Qualification or relegation
1	Prishtina	26	2	.929	28	
2	Bambi	23	5	.821	28	
3	Peja	22	6	.786	28	
4	Trepça	14	14	.500	28	
5	Eurosporti	10	18	.357	28	
6	Kosova Vushtrri	9	19	.321	28	
7	Bashkimi	8	20	.286	28	
8	Mitrovica	0	28	.000	28	

== Playoffs ==
Semifinals
1	Prishtina	2
4	Trepça	0
3	Peja	2
2	Bambi	0

Finals
1	Prishtina	3
3	Peja	0

2010–11 BKT Superliga Champions

Prishtina
9th title

== Records ==
On March 30, 2011, Granit Rugova scored a career-high 110 points against KB Mitrovica. That is a record in the Kosovo Basketball Superleague history. Furthermore, in the 2010–11 season three clubs (Trepça, Mitrovica, Bambi) from Mitrovicë played in the Superleague which also never occurred before.
