= 2018–19 Kosovo Basketball Superleague =

- Duration: 22 September 2018 – 2019
- Games played: 224 (regular season); 9–15 (Playoffs)
- Teams: 8
- TV partner(s): Klan Kosova; Art Motion

Regular season
- Relegated: AFK Borea

Finals
- Champions: Z-Mobile Prishtina; 14th title
- Runners-up: Rahoveci

The 2018–19 IP Superliga e Basketbollit is the 25th season of the Kosovo Basketball Superleague. It started on 22 September 2018.

== Teams ==
IP Superliga e Basketbollit – club locations

Lipjani promoted as champion of the second league.

Peja was expelled from the league due to not meeting the criteria for being admitted. Ponte Prizreni replaced them.

Team	City	Venue	Capacity
AFK Borea	Peja	Karagaq Sports Hall	3,000
Bashkimi	Prizren	Palestra Sportive Sezair Surroi	3,000
Golden Eagle Ylli	Suva Reka	Salla e sporteve "13 Qërshori"	1,800
Lipjani	Lipljan		
Ponte Prizreni	Prizren	Palestra Sportive Sezair Surroi	3,000
Rahoveci	Orahovac	Salla e Sporteve Rahovec	1,800
Trepça	Mitrovica	Salla e sporteve Minatori	2,800
Z-Mobile Prishtina	Pristina	Pallati i Rinisë dhe Sporteve	2,500

== Regular season ==
=== League table ===
Pos	Team	Pld	W	L	PF	PA	PD	Pts	Qualification or relegation
1	Z-Mobile Prishtina	28	28	0	2770	2013	+757	56	Qualification to semifinals
2	Golden Eagle Ylli	28	20	8	2422	2005	+417	48	Qualification to semifinals
3	Rahoveci	28	18	10	2504	2231	+273	46	Qualification to quarterfinals
4	Bashkimi	28	15	13	2511	2371	+140	43	Qualification to quarterfinals
5	Trepça	28	12	16	2413	2227	+186	40	Qualification to quarterfinals
6	Ponte Prizreni	28	12	16	2335	2308	+27	40	Qualification to quarterfinals
7	Lipjani	28	4	24	2163	2573	−410	32	Qualification for relegation playoffs
8	AFK Borea (Note: One point docked.)	28	3	25	1802	3192	−1390	30	Relegation to Kosovo Basketball First League

Source: IP Superliga

=== Results ===
Home \ Away	BOR	BAS	YLL	LIP	PON	RAH	TRE	PRI	BOR	BAS	YLL	LIP	PON	RAH	TRE	PRI
AFK Borea	—	91–98	0–20	75–77	97–87	85–101	77–71	64–88	—	58–142	72–143	54–150	47–116	59–129	55–149	52–140
Bashkimi	116–61	—	84–86	82–77	80–77	103–93	84–88	79–103	181–63	—	65–83	102–77	75–83	76–80	96–80	91–102
Golden Eagle Ylli	109–75	93–106	—	105–83	89–75	83–89	79–80	64–82	132–51	86–68	—	134–81	88–83	73–74	77–61	64–68
Lipjani	83–87	77–88	59–94	—	74–87	70–113	65–59	51–90	125–57	97–102	64–96	—	74–101	61–93	67–93	91–103
Ponte Prizreni	73–67	86–94	89–77	84–67	—	66–73	81–76	86–92	99–70	84–91	76–84	92–81	—	69–86	79–97	83–94
Rahoveci	103–90	81–63	78–101	88–66	101–99	—	82–86	70–93	159–54	80–87	61–62	99–77	68–85	—	82–66	91–94
Trepça	136–70	88–74	58–75	88–59	90–70	88–89	—	83–106	155–60	77–81	75–81	104–78	79–81	77–78	—	83–88
Z-Mobile Prishtina	82–59	111–63	96–67	84–64	91–73	107–86	81–76	—	128–52	109–78	90–77	121–66	106–71	89–70	105–49	—

Source: IP Superliga
Legend: Blue = home team win; Red = away team win.

== Playoffs ==
Playoffs will be played in a best-of-five playoff format. The higher seeded teams played game 1, 2 and 5 at home in the semifinals and games 1, 3 and 5 in the finals.

=== Bracket ===
Quarter-finals
Bashkimi	2
Trepça	0
Rahoveci	2
Ponte Prizreni	1

Semi-finals
Z-Mobile Prishtina	3
Bashkimi	0
Golden Eagle Ylli	0
Rahoveci	3

Finals
Z-Mobile Prishtina	3
Rahoveci	1

=== Quarter-finals ===
Team 1	Series	Team 2	Game 1	Game 2	Game 3
Rahoveci	2–1	Ponte Prizreni	70–71	76–72	84–65
Bashkimi	2–0	Trepça	86–73	88–86	

=== Semi-finals ===
Team 1	Series	Team 2	Game 1	Game 2	Game 3	Game 4	Game 5
Z-Mobile Prishtina	3–0	Bashkimi	111–74	97–88	98–95		
Golden Eagle Ylli	0–3	Rahoveci	93–96	78–80	70–84		

=== Finals ===
Team 1	Series	Team 2	Game 1	Game 2	Game 3	Game 4	Game 5
Z-Mobile Prishtina	3–1	Rahoveci	110–82	84–87	106–80	104–75	

== Relegation playoffs ==
=== Finals ===
Team 1	Agg.	Team 2	1st leg	2nd leg
Vëllaznimi	151–158	Lipjani	74–71	77–87

== Kosovan clubs in European competitions ==
Club	Competition	Progress
Z-Mobile Prishtina	Champions League	First qualifying round
Z-Mobile Prishtina	FIBA Europe Cup	Round of 16
