= Kosovo men's national basketball team =

Men's national basketball team representing Kosovo

Kosovo
- FIBA ranking: 87 ▼1 (3 March 2026)
- Joined FIBA: 2015
- FIBA zone: FIBA Europe
- National federation: Federata e Basketbollit të Kosovës (FBK)
- Coach: Bujar Loci
- Nickname: Dardanët (Dardanians)

FIBA World Cup
- Appearances: None

EuroBasket
- Appearances: None
Home	Away

First international
- Slovenia 113–68 Kosovo (Ljubljana, Slovenia; 31 August 2016)

Biggest win
- Kosovo 76–49 Switzerland (Prizren, Kosovo; 19 July 2023)

Biggest defeat
- Lithuania 106–50 Kosovo (Klaipėda, Lithuania; 26 February 2018)

The Kosovo men's national basketball team (Albanian: Kombëtarja e basketbollit të meshkujve të Kosovës, Serbian: Кошаркашкa репрезентација Косова, romanized: Košarkaška reprezentacija Kosova) represents Kosovo in international basketball. They are controlled by the Basketball Federation of Kosovo, the governing body for basketball in Kosovo. Kosovo has been a member of FIBA since 13 March 2015.

== History ==
=== Pre-independence ===
The Basketball Federation of Kosovo was founded in 1991. During the Yugoslavian era, Kosovo had its own Superleague and lower divisions, in both genders. In the 1990s, Kosovo declared political and sports independence from the Yugoslav system, organising its own league, based on different teams from seven major cities of Kosovo. Some basketball players from Kosovo, especially Kosovo Serbs and Gorani, participated as part of the Serbia and Montenegro and Serbia national teams, while some Kosovo Albanians chose to represent Albania like Florian Miftari and Edmond Azemi. In 2005, the Kosovo national team participated in a friendly tournament in Alexandria where they played against Egypt and Romania. The roster included names like Artan Mehmeti, Edmond Azemi, Ersid Ljuca, Samir Shaptahu, Florian Miftari, Mujo Thaçi, Naim Haxha, Granit Rugova, Blerim Mazreku, Edis Kuraja and Valdet Grapci. Coached by Bujar Loci and Mark Rodiqi, Kosovo surprisingly won both games. The national team played numerous friendlies with Albania known as the Brotherly derby.

=== After independence ===
Kosovo were not allowed to play international matches, not even friendlies by FIBA, until 2015, when the Basketball Federation of Kosovo became an official member of FIBA and FIBA Europe. Kosovo took part in EuroBasket qualification for the first time in 2017. On 31 August 2016, Kosovo played their first official international match against Slovenia during the EuroBasket 2017 qualifiers.

A year later, the national team achieved their first ever win on 2 August 2017 by defeating Macedonia 72–68 in their first match during the 2019 FIBA World Cup European Pre-Qualifiers. After the win, Kosovo would pick up one more victory during the Pre-Qualifiers, against Estonia 75–69 to finish with a (2–2) record to advance to the first round of World Cup qualifying. In the next round, Kosovo would eventually see their World Cup hopes vanish, as the team went winless before being eliminated. Despite all of that they maintain to reach the second qualifying round in their debut participation, reaching the round of 32 best Basketball teams in Europe.

After missing out on reaching the 2019 FIBA World Cup, Kosovo went through pre-qualifiers in order to reach EuroBasket 2022. However, the team would only compile a (2–8) record during the pre-qualifying process to be unable to advance.

== Competitive record ==
=== FIBA World Cup ===
FIBA World Cup					Qualification			
Year	Pos	Pld	W	L	Year	Pld	W	L
(Argentina) 1950 to (Argentina) 1990	Part of Yugoslavia							
(Canada) 1994 to (Japan) 2006	Part of Serbia and Montenegro							
(Turkey) 2010	Not a FIBA member							
(Spain) 2014	Not a FIBA member							
(China) 2019	Did not qualify				2019	10	2	8
(Philippines) (Japan) (Indonesia) 2023	Did not qualify				2023	6	2	4
(Qatar) 2027	Did not qualify				2027	6	2	4
(France) 2031	To be determined				To be determined			
Total	0/3	0	0	0	Total	22	6	16

=== Olympic Games ===
Olympic Games					Qualifying		
Year	Pos	Pld	W	L	Pld	W	L
(Germany) 1936 to (South Korea) 1988	Part of Yugoslavia						
(Spain) 1992 to (Greece) 2004	Part of Serbia and Montenegro						
(China) 2008	Not an IOC member						
(United Kingdom) 2012	Not an IOC member						
(Brazil) 2016	Could not enter						
(Japan) 2020	Could not enter						
(France) 2024	Could not enter						
(United States) 2028	Could not enter						
Total	0/4	0	0	0	0	0	0

=== EuroBasket ===
EuroBasket					Qualification			
Year	Pos	Pld	W	L	Year	Pld	W	L
(Switzerland) 1935 to (Italy) 1991	Part of Yugoslavia							
(Germany) 1993 to (Spain) 2007	Part of Serbia and Montenegro							
(Poland) 2009	Not a FIBA Europe member							
(Lithuania) 2011	Not a FIBA Europe member							
(Slovenia) 2013	Not a FIBA Europe member							
(France) (Croatia) (Germany) (Latvia) 2015	Could not enter							
(Finland) (Israel) (Romania) (Turkey) 2017	Did not qualify				2017	6	0	6
(Czech Republic) (Georgia (country)) (Italy) (Germany) 2022	Did not qualify				2022	8	1	7
(Cyprus) (Finland) (Poland) (Latvia) 2025	Did not qualify				2025	8	3	5
(Estonia) (Greece) (Slovenia) (Spain) 2029	To be determined				To be determined			
Total	0/4	0	0	0	Total	22	4	18

== Results and fixtures ==
Win Loss

=== 2025 ===
20 February 2027 World Cup pre-qualifiers first round	Kosovo	81–79	Azerbaijan	Pristina, Kosovo
19:30 (UTC+1)	Scoring by quarter: 20–21, 23–20, 17–18, 21–20
	Pts: Tmušić 21; Rebs: four players 5 Asts: Myles 6	Boxscore	Pts: Hall 21; Rebs: Hall 16; Asts: K. Mammadov, Turgut 5	Arena: Palace of Youth and Sports; Attendance: 1,000; Referees: Stylianos Simeonidis (GRE), Mehmet Şahin (TUR), Mladen Lučić (MNE)

23 February 2027 World Cup pre-qualifiers first round	Kosovo	73–81	Switzerland	Pristina, Kosovo
19:30 (UTC+1)	Scoring by quarter: 14–23, 16–23, 15–13, 28–22
	Pts: Berisha 20; Rebs: Kapiti 11; Asts: Myles 4	Boxscore	Pts: Ducommun 21; Rebs: Granvorka 10; Asts: George 5	Arena: Palace of Youth and Sports; Attendance: 2,500; Referees: Edgard Ceccarelli (FRA), Polat Parlak (TUR), Jan Baloun (CZE)

30 November EuroBasket 2029 pre-qualifiers first round	Albania	84–99	Kosovo	Shkodër, Albania
18:00 (UTC+1)	Scoring by quarter: 14–25, 14–19, 32–30, 24–25
	Pts: Hamati 19; Rebs: Hamati 10; Asts: Hysa 9	Boxscore	Pts: Berisha 35; Rebs: Kapiti 8 Asts: Armstead 7	Arena: Qazim Dervishi Sports Palace; Attendance: 200; Referees: Mladen Lučić (MNE), Alessandro Perciavalle (ITA), Primož Pipan (SVN)

=== 2026 ===
27 February EuroBasket 2029 pre-qualifiers first round	Kosovo	78–89	Slovakia	Prizren, Kosovo
19:00 (UTC+1)	Scoring by quarter: 27–18, 15–30, 24–26, 12–15
	Pts: Myles 21; Rebs: Shoshi 6 Asts: Myles 5	Boxscore	Pts: DeJulius 26; Rebs: Golian 18; Asts: DeJulius 8	Arena: Sezai Surroi Sports Hall; Attendance: 700; Referees: Ali Şakacı (TUR), Alija Ferevski (MKD), Alin Faur (ROU)

2 July EuroBasket 2029 pre-qualifiers first round	Kosovo	82–89	Albania	Prizren, Kosovo
19:00 (UTC+2)	Scoring by quarter: 23–23, 25–24, 17–22, 17–20
	Pts: Berisha 28; Rebs: Hajrizi 15; Asts: Myles 4	Boxscore	Pts: Tyree 25; Rebs: Gaxho 9 Asts: Tyree 8	Arena: Sezai Surroi Sports Hall; Attendance: 700; Referees: Ciprian Stoica (ROU), Landy Pierre (FRA), Diogo Martins (POR)

5 July EuroBasket 2029 pre-qualifiers first round	Slovakia	86–83	Kosovo	Spišská Nová Ves, Slovakia
18:00 (UTC+2)	Scoring by quarter: 33–22, 17–20, 20–21, 16–20
	Pts: Hronský 20; Rebs: Brodziansky 11; Asts: Hlivák 8	Boxscore	Pts: Hajrizi 20; Rebs: Shoshi 13; Asts: Hajrizi, Myles 4	Arena: Spiš Aréna; Attendance: 3,509; Referees: Viktor Nagy (HUN), Gabrielius Simonavičius (LTU), Martin Van Howe (BEL)

== Team ==
=== Current roster ===
The following is the Kosovo roster called up for the 2027 FIBA World Cup pre-qualifiers first round matches against Switzerland and Ireland, on 21 and 24 February 2024.

Kosovo men's national basketball team roster
Players
Coaches

Pos.	No.	Name	Age – Date of birth	Height	Club	Ctr.
G	0	Dominic Artis	31 – 7 July 1993	1.88 m (6 ft 2 in)	SIG Strasbourg	(France)
G	1	Arti Hajdari	31 – 12 May 1993	1.90 m (6 ft 3 in)	Peja	(Kosovo)
G	2	Malcolm Armstead	35 – 1 August 1989	1.85 m (6 ft 1 in)	Ylli	(Kosovo)
C	3	Dardan Kapiti	24 – 22 March 2000	2.08 m (6 ft 10 in)	Trepça	(Kosovo)
G	4	Musab Malaj	27 – 17 November 1996	1.88 m (6 ft 2 in)	Peja	(Kosovo)
C	6	Gëzim Morina	31 – 12 December 1992	2.04 m (6 ft 8 in)	Ylli	(Kosovo)
G	7	Mikaile Tmušić	31 – 6 January 1993	1.89 m (6 ft 2 in)	Trepça	(Kosovo)
F	9	Rron Ukaj	24 – 10 September 2000	2.00 m (6 ft 7 in)	Peja	(Kosovo)
F	10	Arian Çallakaj	32 – 9 July 1992	1.96 m (6 ft 5 in)	Ylli	(Kosovo)
G	11	Dardan Berisha (C)	35 – 15 November 1988	1.90 m (6 ft 3 in)	Peja	(Kosovo)
G	17	Norik Binqe	19 – 25 October 2005	1.96 m (6 ft 5 in)	Bora	(Kosovo)
F	21	Samir Zekiqi	29 – 23 January 1995	2.03 m (6 ft 8 in)	Bashkimi Prizren	(Kosovo)
F	22	Meriton Ismaili	24 – 3 April 2000	1.93 m (6 ft 4 in)	Bashkimi Prizren	(Kosovo)
F	23	Muhamedali Janjeva	26 – 28 January 1998	2.02 m (6 ft 8 in)	Prishtina	(Kosovo)
C	24	Lis Shoshi	30 – 29 June 1994	2.11 m (6 ft 11 in)	Ylli	(Kosovo)
F	28	Erjon Kastrati	29 – 30 December 1994	1.97 m (6 ft 6 in)	Trepça	(Kosovo)
G	33	Jon Ismajli	18 – 23 December 2005	1.93 m (6 ft 4 in)	Prishtina	(Kosovo)
G	66	Valon Bunjaku	26 – 2 January 1998	1.85 m (6 ft 1 in)	Bashkimi Prizren	(Kosovo)
F		Eliot Peci	20 – 27 April 2004	1.80 m (5 ft 11 in)	Prishtina	(Kosovo)

Head coach

- (France) Jean-Denys Choulet

Assistant coach(es)

- (Kosovo) Andin Rashica
- (Kosovo) Bujar Loci

Legend

- (C) Team captain
- Club – describes last club
  before the competition
- Age – describes age,
  on 29 October 2024

=== Depth chart ===
As of 30 June 2022

Pos.	Starting 5	Bench 1	Bench 2
C	Fisnik Rugova	Samir Zekiqi
PF	Muhamedali Janjeva	Gëzim Morina
SF	Drilon Hajrizi	Rron Ukaj	Meriton Ismaili
SG	Dardan Berisha	Ardit Pepaj
PG	Amin Hot	Altin Morina

=== Head coach history ===
No.	Name	Period	Record
1	(Kosovo) Arben Krasniqi	2011–2017	0–6
2	(United States) Brad Greenberg	2017–2018	2–8
3	(Croatia) (Bosnia and Herzegovina) Damir Mulaomerović	2018–2019	1–7
4	(Greece) Christos Marmarinos	2020–2023	3–7
5	(Israel) Rami Hadar	2023–2024	3–3
6	(France) Jean-Denys Choulet	2024–2025	2–4
7	(Kosovo) Bujar Loci	2025–present	1–0

=== Retired numbers ===
No.	Player	Position	Tenure	Date of retirement	Ref
15	Gazmend Sinani	Center	2016–2018	25 June 2018	

== See also ==
- Sport in Kosovo
- Kosovo men's national under-20 basketball team
- Kosovo men's national under-18 basketball team
- Kosovo men's national under-16 basketball team
