= Kosovo Supercup (basketball) =

- Organising body: Basketball Federation of Kosovo
- Founded: 1997; 28 years ago
- First season: 1997
- Country: Kosovo
- Confederation: FIBA Europe (Europe)
- Number of teams: 8 (formerly 2)
- Current champions: Trepça (3rd title) (2024)
- Most championships: Prishtina (8 titles)
- TV partners: Kujtesa, ArtMotion
- Website: www.basketbolli.com

The Kosovo Basketball Supercup (in Albanian: Superkupa e Kosovës) is an annual professional basketball competition between clubs from Kosovo. Founded in 1997, it is run by the Basketball Federation of Kosovo.

The Supercup was organized between the Superleague and the Cup winner until 2020. Now the format is the same like in the Cup where all the teams from the Superleague compete for the title in a final eight system.

== Titles by club ==
Club	Cups	Years
Prishtina	8	2005, 2012, 2013, 2014, 2018, 2019, 2020, 2022
Trepça	3	2002, 2023, 2024
Peja	2	1997, 2015
Prizreni	1	2021
