= Kujtesa =

Kosovo telecommunications company

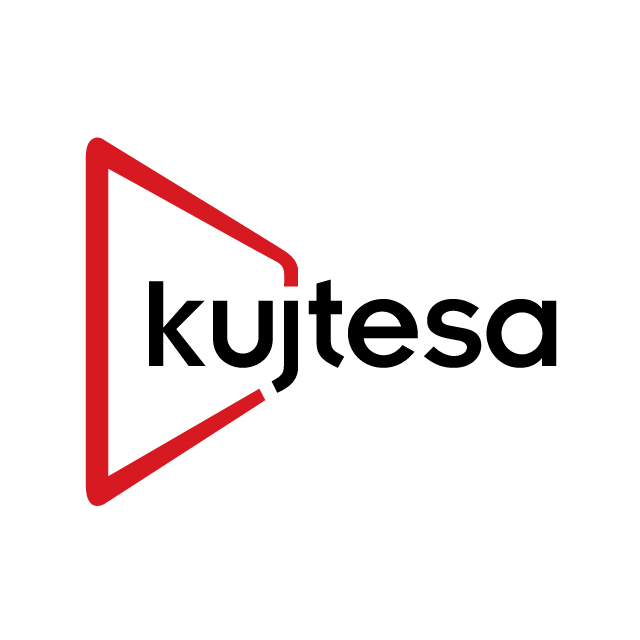
- Industry: Communications services
- Founded: 1995 (31 years ago)
- Headquarters: Pristina, Kosovo
- Area served: Kosovo
- Products: ISP; Cable TV; Fixed telephony
- Website: www.kujtesa.com

Kujtesa is a telecommunications company established in Kosovo.

The company was founded in October 1995 by Zhutaj Medi as a business that offered general IT services, such as backing up CDs to computers, sales, and repairs. In 1999, during the Kosovo War, the company lost most of its assets and capital but would go on to become one of the first ISPs in Kosovo.

Currently, Kujtesa provides internet, networking, cable TV, IPTV, and VoIP services.

== History ==
1995

Kujtesa is established as a retailer of computer equipment.

2000

Wireless data network is implemented in Pristina.

2006

Kujatesa enters the market of cable television.

2012

Launch of the Sports channels platform.

2016

Expansion of the network in rural areas (about 98% of the territory of Kosovo).

2021

Collaboration with ArtMotion.
