= KB Trepça =

Professional basketball club in Kosovo

- Nickname: Xehëtarët, Minatorët (The Miners)
- Leagues: Kosovo Superleague; Kosovo Cup; Europe Cup
- Founded: 1947; 79 years ago
- History: KB Trepça; 1947–present
- Arena: Salla e sporteve Minatori
- Capacity: 4,500
- Location: Mitrovicë, Kosovo
- Team colors: Green, black
- President: Vullnet Sefaja
- Head coach: Adis Bećiragić
- Team captain: Burim Zekiqi
- Championships: 7 National Leagues; 9 National Cups; 3 National Supercups; 1 Liga Unike; 1 Superkupa Mbarëkombëtare
- Website: kbtrepca.com
Home	Away	Third

Klubi i Basketbollit Trepça is a professional basketball club based in Mitrovica, Kosovo. The club competes domestically in the Kosovo Basketball Superleague and Kosovo Cup and internationally in the Fiba Europe Cup. It is one of the most successful clubs in Kosovo, Trepça has won seven National Championships, nine Kosovo Basketball Cups, three Kosovo Supercups, one Liga Unike and one Liga Unike Supercup.

== History ==
=== Early years and successes in Yugoslavia (1940–1992) ===
The origins of Trepça can be traced back to the 1940s when basketball started gaining popularity in Mitrovica. However, it wasn't until 1947 that the club was officially established. Initially, KB Trepça competed in local leagues and tournaments, gradually developing its reputation as a competitive team.

In the 1960s, 1970s and 1980s, Trepça experienced its golden era. The club achieved numerous successes. Trepça won several regional titles and made their debut in the First B Federal Basketball League, the country's second-tier basketball competition, in the 1980s. The team consistently performed well and became known for its strong roster of talented players like Ferit Zekolli, Blerim Vuniqi, Vesko Pajović, Naim Hajrizi, Nusret Qubreli or George Dikeoulakos, and skilled coaching staff. In 1982–83, Trepça reached the eightfinals of the Yugoslav Basketball Cup but lost against Borac Čačak 85–91. In 1988–1989, Trepça once again reached the eightfinals but lost against Red Star Belgrade.

Following the dissolution of Yugoslavia in the early 1990s and the subsequent conflicts in the Balkans, Kosovo went through a turbulent period. KB Trepça, like many other institutions in the region, faced significant challenges and disruptions. The club's activities were severely impacted, and it took several years for basketball to regain stability in Kosovo.

=== Establishment of the Kosovo Basketball Federation (1992–1999) ===
With the establishment of the Kosovo Basketball Federation in 1992, KB Trepça started competing in the Kosovo Basketball Superleague. KB Trepça won their first league title in the 1992/1993 season against KB Peja. The following year, Trepça reached the final once again but lost against Peja.

=== Years of dominance (1999–2002) ===
Trepça won the Kosovo Basketball Superleague in 2000 and 2001. Furthermore, Trepça won the Kosovo Cup in 1999. The coach was Ahmet Behrami and notable players during this period were Ilir Selmani, Naim Hajrizi, Brahim Veseli, Artan Mehmeti, Eroll Pepiqi, Besim Braha, Fikret Hanxhiq, Edmond Raqa and many others. In the 2002 season Trepça lost the final against KB Prishtina.

=== New successes and rivalries (2002–2012) ===
Trepça continued to be one of the dominant forces in Kosovan basketball by always reaching the play-offs and by winning the Kosovo Cup in 2004 with notable players like Igor Miličić, Haashim Simmons, Ylber Jusufi, Besim Braha, Fikret Hanxhiq, Ilir Selmani, Naim Haxha, Brahim Veseli etc. Trepça lost the finals in 2007 and 2010 against KB Prishtina. The 2010–11 season was a special season for Trepça where they played two local derbies against KB Mitrovica and KB Bambi who both were from Mitrovica. The following season Trepça won the Superleague 3–2 against Prishtina in the finals. In addition to that Trepça won the Kosovo Cup the same year. The roster was made by players like Jaleel Nelson, Drilon Hajrizi, Gazmend Asllani, Besnik Azemi, Fikret Hanxhiq, Arian Tahiri, Valdrin Haxhiu, Imer Tahiri, Emir Zimic and Luard Halili. Drilon Hajrizi became the MVP of 2011–12 Superleague season. During this period and especially after the 2012 finals the rivalry with Prishtina intensified.

=== Trepça's debut in a European competition and struggle for the play-offs in the Superleague (2012–2019) ===
From 2012 to 2019 Trepça constantly placed 4th or 5th fighting for the play-offs in the Superleague. In 2014, 2016 and 2017 they reached the semi-finals but did not manage to go further. In 2016, Trepça made their debut in the Balkan International Basketball League where they won against Karpoš Sokoli, Feni Industries and Sutjeska. Nevertheless, they finished 5th, not making it into the play-offs.

=== Downfall and revival (2019–2023) ===
In the 2019-20 Superleague season Trepça almost relegated after finishing 7th for the first time in their history. Trepça won against AS Prishtina in the play-out. The following season Trepça once again placed 7th. This time they faced Istogu in the play-out winning 193–155 in aggregate. Notable players were Drilon Hajrizi, Burim Zekiqi, Dino Butorac, Valdrin Haxhiu and Stavros Toutziarakis. Trepça started a reorganization in 2021 by signing several players like Andrew Gordon, Samir Zekiqi and Amin Hot. The new coach was Lumbomir Minchev. Trepça won the Kosovo Cup in 2022 after one decade by beating KB Bashkimi 76–62 in the final. On 3 March 2022 they signed former NBA-player Rodney Purvis who later became a key player. Trepça reached the final in the 2021-22 Superleague season but failed to win against Ylli.

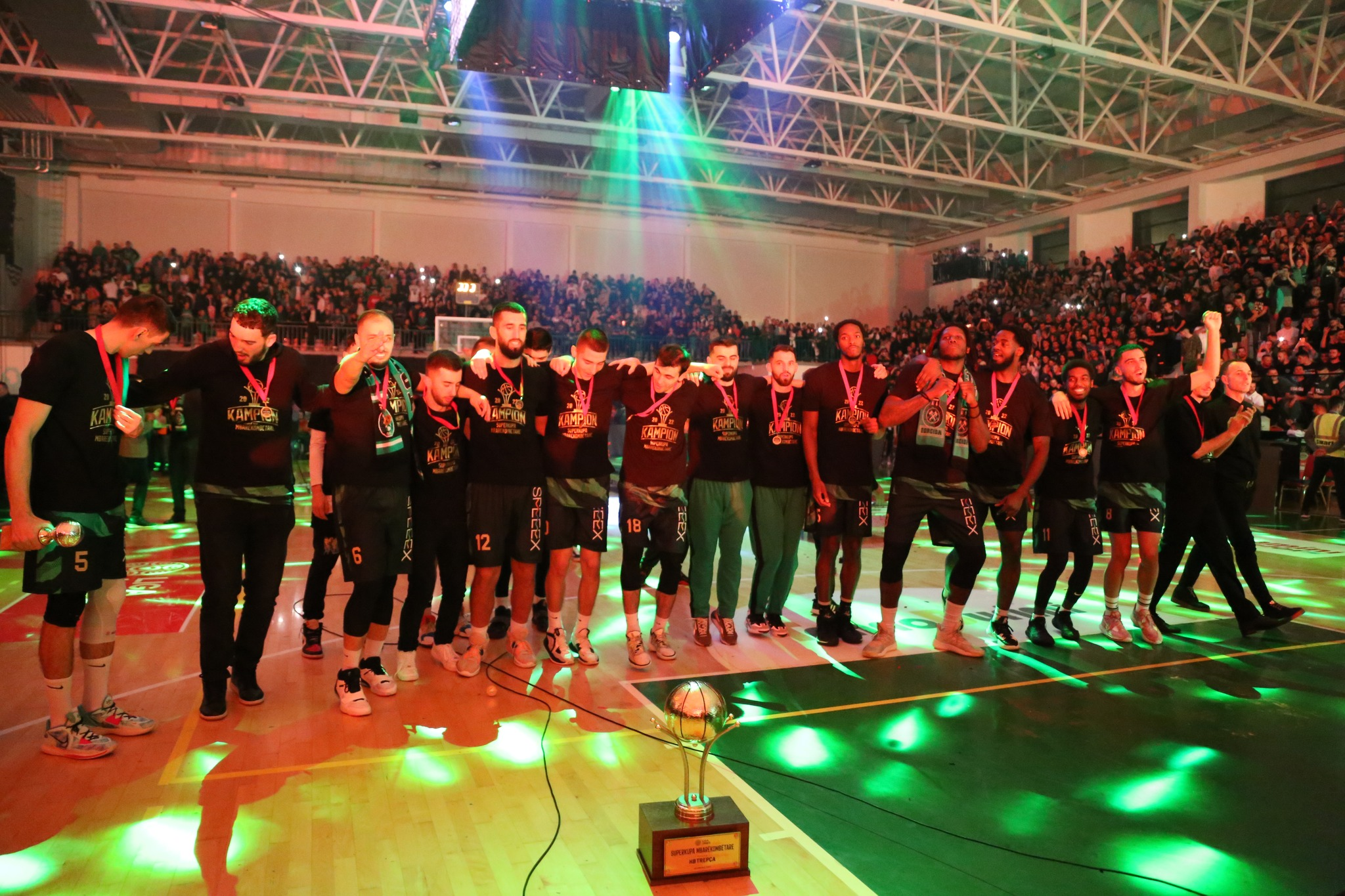
KB Trepça in Mitrovicë celebrating the Liga Unike Supercup (2022)

In 2022–23, Trepça had a turbulent season and finished only fourth in the regular season, but managed to win the Kosovo Cup once again and secured another runners-up in the Superleague.

=== (2023–present) ===
In 2023, Adis Bećiragić was appointed head coach of Trepça, marking a turning point in the club's modern history. Under his leadership, Trepça qualified for the FIBA Europe Cup regular season for the first time, representing a significant milestone for the club. In the group stage, Trepça competed against ZZ Leiden and BCM Gravelines-Dunkerque, but did not advance further.

The team's resurgence followed a remarkable transformation: Trepça had narrowly survived relegation for the first time in its history during the 2020–21 season, through the play-out rounds. Since then, the club reached four consecutive Kosovo Superleague finals, won back-to-back league championships (2023–24 and 2024–25), and secured all major domestic trophies. Players like Kevin Bracy-Davis, Drilon Hajrizi, Jordy Tshimanga etc. and especially Darnell Edge, the M.V.P. of 2024 Liga Unike and 2024 Kosovo Superleague, contributed to this huge success.

During this period, Trepça won four consecutive Kosovo Cup titles, including the 2025 edition, and captured the Kosovo Supercup in 2023 and 2024, marking two consecutive wins. The club also claimed the Liga Unike title for the first time in 2023–24, completing an unprecedented clean sweep of domestic and regional competitions.

Trepça has now competed for three seasons straight in European Competitions like FIBA Champions League and FIBA Europe Cup. Trepça became the first team from Kosovo to progress past a qualifying stage in the FIBA Champions League, defeating the Cypriot club Keravnos 82–79 in the 2024–25 season. This year marked the club's third consecutive season in European competitions.

== Supporters & rivalries ==
The main supporters of Trepça are Torcida Mitrovicë. The group is recognized for creating a strong home-court atmosphere at the club's home matches in Mitrovica. Founded in 1984, they are the oldest ethnic Albanian ultras.

=== Sigal Prishtina ===
One of the most notable rivalries for Trepça is with Sigal Prishtina, another basketball club from Kosovo. Matches between Trepça and Sigal Prishtina often generate a lot of excitement and anticipation among fans. These two teams have a long-standing rivalry, and their matches are highly competitive and intense. The rivalry was the reason for several incidents between Trepça's supporters' group Torcida 1984 and Prishtina's supporters' group Plisat including violence and hooliganism.

=== KB Peja ===
Another significant rivalry for Trepça is with KB Peja, another prominent basketball club from Kosovo. Matches between Trepça and Peja have historically been fierce and have attracted a lot of attention from fans. Both teams have had successful seasons and have often been in direct competition for titles and championships.

== Arena ==
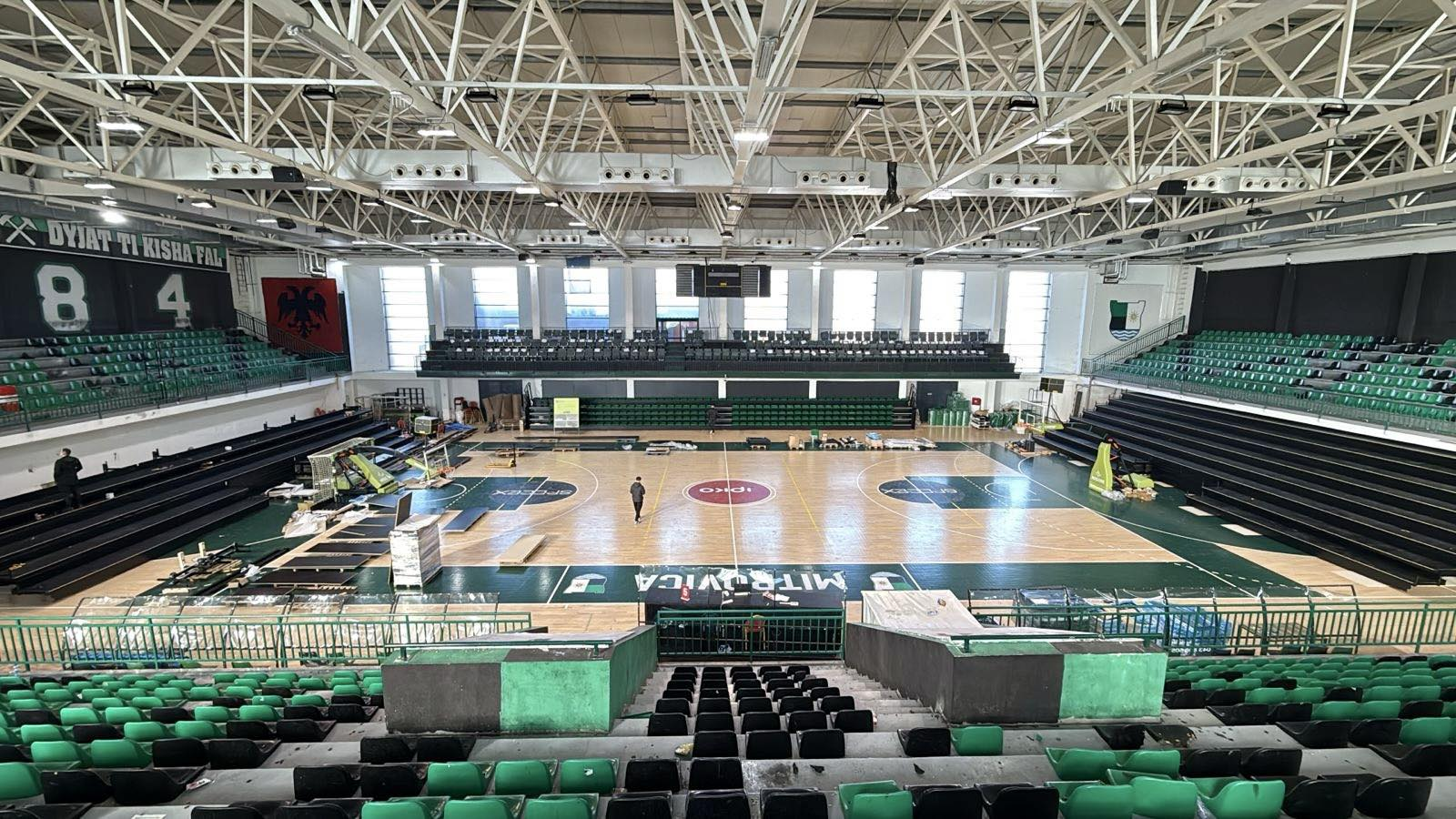
Arena Minatori after retractable seating was added in December 2025

Trepça plays its home games at Salla e Sporteve Minatori, located in Mitrovica.

The arena currently has a seating capacity of approximately 4,500 spectators after several renovations from the club, including latest addition of retractable seats, and the arena serves as one of the most prominent basketball venues in Kosovo. In addition to domestic league and cup matches, the arena has hosted Superleague finals and European competition games.

The venue is widely noted for its intense atmosphere during high-profile matches, particularly in playoff and rivalry games.

== European record ==
Season	Competition	Round	Club	Home	Away
2022–23	FIBA Europe Cup	Qualifying round	(Germany) BG Göttingen	62–76	
2023–24	FIBA Europe Cup	Qualifying round	(Iceland) Tindastóll		77–69
2023–24	FIBA Europe Cup	Qualifying round	(Estonia) Pärnu Sadam		77–67
2023–24	FIBA Europe Cup	Regular season	(Netherlands) Leiden	54–84	76–80
2023–24	FIBA Europe Cup	Regular season	(France) Gravelines-Dunkerque	76–68	49–83
2024–25	Champions League	Qualifying round	(Cyprus) Keravnos		82–79
2024–25	Champions League	Qualifying round	(Czech Republic) Nymburk		78–84
2024–25	FIBA Europe Cup	Regular season	(Germany) Riesen Ludwigsburg	57–70	54–87
2024–25	FIBA Europe Cup	Regular season	(United Kingdom) Caledonia Gladiators	76–80	20–0 (Note: The win was awarded to Caledonia Gladiators due to visa problems for Trepça.)
2024–25	FIBA Europe Cup	Regular season	(France) Dijon	84–89	73–118
2025–26	Champions League	Qualifying round	(Netherlands) Heroes Den Bosch		68–80
2025–26	FIBA Europe Cup	Regular season	(Greece) PAOK	75–77	74–85
2025–26	FIBA Europe Cup	Regular season	(Germany) Löwen Braunschweig	70–84	70–80
2025–26	FIBA Europe Cup	Regular season	(Poland) Anwil Włocławek	87–97	78–96
2026–27	FIBA Europe Cup	Regular season	(Greece) Promitheas Patras	77–91	71–81
2026–27	FIBA Europe Cup	Regular season	(Croatia) Split	94–88	78–69
2026–27	FIBA Europe Cup	Regular season	(Germany) Gladiators Trier		59–96
2026–27	FIBA Europe Cup	Regular season	(Georgia (country)) Batumi		91–70
2026–27	FIBA Europe Cup	Regular season	(Czech Republic) Opava	89–80	

== Players ==
=== Current roster ===
KB Trepça roster
Players
Coaches

Pos.	No.	Nat.	Name	Ht.	Wt.	Age
G	0	(United States) (Jamaica)	Thelwell, Drew	1.90 m (6 ft 3 in)	89 kg (196 lb)	24 – 22 May 2002
F/C	1	(Kosovo)	Haliti, Venis	1.99 m (6 ft 6 in)	85 kg (187 lb)	18 – 15 July 2008
F	2	(United States)	Bracy-Davis, Kevin	2.03 m (6 ft 8 in)	95 kg (209 lb)	31 – 23 January 1995
PG	3	(United States)	Payne, JaCori	1.80 m (5 ft 11 in)	75 kg (165 lb)	30 – 15 June 1996
G	5	(United States)	Mobley, Matt	1.93 m (6 ft 4 in)	84 kg (185 lb)	32 – 1 September 1994
F	6	(United States)	Tokoto, JP	2.01 m (6 ft 7 in)	92 kg (203 lb)	33 – 15 September 1993
SF	7	(Kosovo)	Callakaj, Arian	1.93 m (6 ft 4 in)	84 kg (185 lb)	34 – 9 July 1992
G/F	8	(Kosovo)	Zekiqi, Burim (C)	1.95 m (6 ft 5 in)	78 kg (172 lb)	29 – 17 April 1997
SG	11	(Kosovo) (Montenegro)	Tmušić, Mikaile	1.88 m (6 ft 2 in)	90 kg (198 lb)	33 – 6 January 1993
PF	12	(Kosovo)	Hajrizi, Drilon	2.03 m (6 ft 8 in)	108 kg (238 lb)	35 – 17 January 1991
F	13	(United States)	Graham, James	2.01 m (6 ft 7 in)	102 kg (225 lb)	26 – 26 August 2000
C	21	(Kosovo) (United States)	Jones, Shawn	2.07 m (6 ft 9 in)	111 kg (245 lb)	34 – 25 March 1992
C	35	(Kosovo)	Kapiti, Dardan	2.08 m (6 ft 10 in)	95 kg (209 lb)	26 – 22 March 2000
SG	41	(United States)	Hasbrouck, Kenny	1.91 m (6 ft 3 in)	88 kg (194 lb)	39 – 24 December 1986
SF	55	(Kosovo)	Dahsyla, Rron	1.93 m (6 ft 4 in)	95 kg (209 lb)	21 – 3 May 2005

Head coach

- (Bosnia and Herzegovina) Adis Bećiragić

Assistant coach(es)

- (Kosovo) Petrit Zeqiri
- (Kosovo) Brahim Veseli
- (Kosovo) Diamant Çaushi

Legend

- (C) Team captain
- Injured

- Roster
Updated: 31 October 2026

=== Depth chart ===
Pos.	Starting 5	Bench 1	Bench 2
C	Drilon Hajrizi	Shawn Jones	Dardan Kapiti
PF	Kevin Bracy-Davis	James Graham	Venis Haliti
SF	Kenny Hasbrouck	JP Tokoto	Arian Callakaj
SG	Mikaile Tmušić	Rron Dahsyla	Burim Zekiqi
PG	JaCori Payne	Drew Thelwell	Matt Mobley

== Honors and titles ==
=== Domestic ===
Kosovo Superleague

- Winners (7): 1992–93, 1999–00, 2000–01, 2011–12, 2023–24, 2024–25, 2025–26
- Runners-up (6): 1993–94, 2001–02, 2006–07, 2009–10, 2021–22, 2022–23

Kosovo Cup

- Winners (9): 1993, 2000, 2004, 2012, 2022, 2023, 2024, 2025, 2026
- Runners-up (2): 2005, 2010

Kosovo Supercup

- Winners (3): 2002, 2023, 2024
- Runners-up (2): 2021, 2022

=== Regional ===
Liga Unike

- Winners (1): 2023–24

Liga Unike Supercup

- Winners (1): 2022

== Season by season ==
=== KB Trepça (2015–2025) ===
Seasons	Division	Pos.	Play offs	Kosovo Cup	Liga Unike	Kosovo Supercup	European competitions
2015-16	1	4th	Semifinals	Quarterfinals	—	—	—
2016-17	1	4th	Semifinals	Semifinals	—	—	Balkan League
2017-18	1	5th	—	Quarterfinals	—	—	—
2018-19	1	5th	Quarterfinals	Quarterfinals	—	—	—
2019-20	1	7th	Postponed	—	—	—	—
2020-21	1	7th	Play Out(Win)	Quarterfinals	—	—	—
2021-22	1	2nd	Runner-up	Champion	-	Runner-up	—
2022–23	1	4th	Runner-up	Champion	Postponed	Runner-up	FIBA Europe Cup QF
2023–24	1	1st	Champion	Champion	Champion	Champion	Champions League QF/FIBA Europe Cup RS
2024–25	1	2nd	Champion	Champion	Did not participate	Champion	Champions League QF/FIBA Europe Cup RS

== Notable players ==
Note: Flags indicate national team eligibility at FIBA-sanctioned events. Players may hold other non-FIBA nationalities not displayed.

Criteria

To appear in this section a player must have either:

- Set a club record or won an individual award while at the club
- Played at least one official international match for their national team at any time
- Played at least one official NBA match at any time.

- (Albania) Herion Faslija
- (Albania) Klein Strazimiri
- (Albania) (Kosovo) Ersid Lucaj
- (The Bahamas) Sammy Hunter
- (Barbados) Kregg Jones
- (Bosnia and Herzegovina) Jasenko Elezović
- (Bosnia and Herzegovina) Edin Nurkanović
- (Bosnia and Herzegovina) Dinko Pelto
- (Bosnia and Herzegovina) Nedžad Spahić
- (Bosnia and Herzegovina) (Croatia) Marko Zorz
- (Cameroon) Charles Manga
- (Canada) Jordy Tshimanga
- (Croatia) Davor Halbauer
- (Croatia) Davor Kurilić
- (Croatia) Jure Lonzančić
- (Croatia) Igor Miličić
- (United Kingdom) (Netherlands) Devon van Oostrum
- (Finland) Mustapha Amzil
- (Kosovo) Gazmend Asllani
- (Kosovo) Besim Braha
- (Kosovo) Drilon Hajrizi
- (Kosovo) Naim Haxha
- (Kosovo) Valdrin Haxhiu
- (Kosovo) Fikret Hanxhiq
- (Kosovo) Esat Ibrahimi
- (Kosovo) Dardan Kapiti
- (Kosovo) Erjon Kastrati
- (Kosovo) Musab Mala
- (Kosovo) Besim Maxhuni
- (Kosovo) Artan Mehmeti
- (Kosovo) Eroll Pepiqi
- (Kosovo) Edmon Raqa
- (Kosovo) Vigan Raqa
- (Kosovo) Ilir Selmani
- (Kosovo) Bekim Syla
- (Kosovo) Arian Tahiri
- (Kosovo) Besnik Tupella
- (Kosovo) Burim Zekiqi
- (Kosovo) Samir Zekiqi
- (Kosovo) (Montenegro) Amin Hot
- (Kosovo) (Montenegro) Mikaile Tmusiq
- (Kosovo) (North Macedonia) Ylber Jusufi
- (Kosovo) (North Macedonia) Muhamed Thaçi
- (Kosovo) (United States) Shawn Jones
- (North Macedonia) Dime Tasovski
- (Rwanda) Axel Mpoyo
- (Saint Vincent and the Grenadines) (Trinidad and Tobago) John Gardiner
- (South Sudan) Junior Madut
- (Spain) Álvaro Calvo
- (Spain) Jan Orfila
- (United States) Jamel Artis
- (United States) Clevon Brown
- (United States) Ken Brown
- (United States) Will Daniels
- (United States) Darnell Edge
- (United States) Darren Fenn
- (United States) Rodney Purvis
- (United States) Jaleel Nelson
- (United States) (Turkey) Dennis Mims
- (Socialist Federal Republic of Yugoslavia) Vesko Pajović
- (Socialist Federal Republic of Yugoslavia) (Kosovo) Nusret Qubreli
- (Socialist Federal Republic of Yugoslavia) (Kosovo) Blerim Vuniqi
- (Socialist Federal Republic of Yugoslavia) (Kosovo) Ferit Zekolli

== Coaching history ==
Coach	Years active
(Republic of Kosova) Ferit Zekolli	1991–1993
(Kosovo) Ahmet Behrami	1999–2001
(Bosnia and Herzegovina) Senad Spuzanin	2001–2003
(Croatia) Čedomir Perinčić	2003–2004
(Kosovo) Ahmet Behrami	2004–2006
(Kosovo) Naim Hajrizi	2006–2008
(Bosnia and Herzegovina) Aleksander Sarkanj	2008–2009
(North Macedonia) Saša Katalinić	2009–2010
(Kosovo) Ilir Selmani	2011–2012
(Croatia) Neven Plantak	2012–2013
(Finland) Mika Turunen	2013
(North Macedonia) Panče Milevski	2013
(Spain) Israel Martín	2013–2014
(Kosovo) Izet Tahiri	2014–2015
(Croatia) Neven Plantak	2015–2016
(Greece) Dimitris Papadopoulos	2016–2017
(Kosovo) Ilir Selmani	2017–2019
(Turkey) Serhat Sehit	2020–2021
(Bulgaria) Lyubomir Minchev	2021–2022
(North Macedonia) Aleksandar Jončevski	2022–2023
(Turkey) Engin Gençoglu	2023
(Bosnia and Herzegovina) (Turkey) Adis Bećiragić	2023–present

== See also ==
- KF Trepça (football)
- KH Trepça (handball)
