= KB Prishtina =

Professional basketball club in Kosovo

- Leagues: Kosovo Superleague; Kosovo Cup; BIBL; Liga Unike
- Founded: 1970; 56 years ago
- History: KB Prishtina; 1970–present
- Arena: Palace of Youth and Sports
- Capacity: 2,800
- Location: Pristina, Kosovo
- Team colors: Blue, White
- President: Blerand Stavileci
- Head coach: Jeronimo Šarin
- 2025–26 position: Kosovo Basketball Superleague, Quarterfinalist (6th)
- Championships: 15 Kosovo Cup; 14 Kosovo Superleague; 3 Balkan League; 8 Kosovo Supercups
- Website: kbprishtina.com
| Home | Away | Third |

Klubi i Basketbollit Prishtina (English: Basketball Club Prishtina), officially known as Sigal Prishtina due to sponsorship reasons, is a Kosovar professional basketball club based in Pristina. The team currently competes in the Kosovo Superleague, Balkan International Basketball League (BIBL) and the FIBA Europe Cup.

They are the most successful club in Kosovo, having won 14 national championships, 15 national cups and 7 supercups in the last 14 years. Since 2013 the club has competed in the Balkan International Basketball League (BIBL), and they became the first Kosovar side to win the competition first in 2014–15 after defeating Bulgarian side BC Rilski Sportist in the finals. They would win the same competition the following season in 2015–16 in which they would beat Montenegrin side Mornar Bar in the final, to win this competition back to back as the only Kosovan Basketball club in the history at this competition. In 2015, Prishtina joined the newly formed European second tier competition, the FIBA Europe Cup. They became the first Kosovar Basketball club to reach the round of 16 in the FIBA Europe Cup in the 2018–19 season, winning six matches in their 14 match long campaign. Prishtina has won 15 games in European basketball competitions so far.

== History ==
The club was founded in 1970. By 2004, the club had racked up huge debt, which led to the original club being forced to fold and a new club under the name OJQ KB Prishtina was formed in its place. The debts were then inherited by the new club and they were not dealt with, which led to the club folding once again on 22 September 2011 and a new club was once again formed in its place.

In the 2015–16 season, Prishtina made its debut in the FIBA Europe Cup and became the first Kosovo team to play in a European club competition. Since then, Prishtina competed in every season of the FIBA Europe Cup.

=== European competitions ===
In the 2013–14 season, Prishtina played its first season in Europe in Balkan International Basketball League (BIBL). In the first season KB Prishtina took the 2nd place during the Regular Season with 11 wins and 5 losses, qualifying for the Final Four. They were organizers of the Final Four 2013–14 of BIBL, but they lost to Galil Gilboa 74–86 in the semifinal, and to Balkan (BUL) 73–79 in the 3rd place game.

In the BIBL Season 2014–15, KB Prishtina won the Trophy of the for the first time Balkan International Basketball League, KB Prishtina faced in the Quarterfinals SCM Craiova they won first away in Romania 73−77 and then at home in Prishtina 70−98 to progress in the Semifinals off this Tournament. In the Semifinals KB Prishtina faced KK Kožuv from Macedonia yet again in this Tournament. At home Prishtina surprised Kožuv and beat them deservedly 85–61 at home in Pristina especially Edin Bavčić scored 25 points in this Match and Dardan Berisha with six assist points helped Prishtina massively at this stage. Away in Kožuv they lost 86-80 but it was enough to qualify for their first ever Finals in the Balkan International Basketball League. In the finals they meet BC Rilski Sportist they won both matches against BC Rilski Sportist first in Prishtina 74–72, and second in Bulgaria 80–71, to win the Trophy in this Campaign. Being the only Basketball Club from Kosovo to achieve this feet so far. In 20 matches KB Prishtina achieved 13 wins and only seven losses in the process. But in the next BIBL season 2015–16, KB Prishtina would compete again in the Balkan International Basketball League where they faced in the first round KK Kožuv KK Mornar Bar and BC Beroe. In this round KB Prishtina won 4 Matches and progressed deservedly in the next Round.

In the 2015–16 season, KB Prishtina played in FIBA Europe Cup for the first time. They failed to qualify for the next round with two wins and sour losses in the Group Stage.

In the FIBA Europe Cup 2016–17 KB Prishtina faced in the first round Enisey BC Rilski Sportist and Demir İnşaat Büyükçekmece. KB Prishtina did improve in their performances, especially at home. Their only win was an 87–80 at home against Enisey—not enough for KB Prishtina to progress in the next round.

== Sponsorship naming ==
The club has had several denominations through the years due to its sponsorship:

- MEB Prishtina (2002–2003)
- BpB Prishtina (2003–2004)
- Sigal Prishtina (2004–2011, 2012–2018, 2019-2024)
- Z-Mobile Prishtina (2018–2019)
- Sigal Prishtina Mercure (2024)
- Sigal Prishtina (2024-present)

== Matches in European competitions ==
| Season | Competition | Round | Opponent | Home | Away |
|---|---|---|---|---|---|
| 2015–16 | FIBA Europe Cup | RS | (Romania) Energia Târgu Jiu | 66–62 | 87–72 |
| 2015–16 | FIBA Europe Cup | RS | (Cyprus) AEK Larnaca | 70–83 | 101–84 |
| 2015–16 | FIBA Europe Cup | RS | (Kazakhstan) Astana | 75–73 | 82–78 |
| 2016–17 | FIBA Europe Cup | RS | (Russia) Enisey | 87–80 | 102–101 |
| 2016–17 | FIBA Europe Cup | RS | (Bulgaria) Rilski Sportist | 100–104 | 100–98 |
| 2016–17 | FIBA Europe Cup | RS | (Turkey) Demir İnşaat Büyükçekmece | 71–81 | 100–58 |
| 2017–18 | Champions League | QR1 | (Belarus) Tsmoki-Minsk | 50–57 | 89–74 |
| 2017–18 | FIBA Europe Cup | RS | (Ukraine) Khimik | 76–65 | 59–78 |
| 2017–18 | FIBA Europe Cup | RS | (Belgium) Belfius Mons-Hainaut | 69–75 | 72–74 |
| 2017–18 | FIBA Europe Cup | RS | (Turkey) Demir İnşaat Büyükçekmece | 66–84 | 86–59 |
| 2018–19 | Champions League | QR1 | (Netherlands) Donar | 84–64 | 80–55 |
| 2018–19 | FIBA Europe Cup | RS | (Denmark) Bakken Bears | 77–100 | 108–84 |
| 2018–19 | FIBA Europe Cup | RS | (Ukraine) Cherkaski Mavpy | 92–82 | 73–92 |
| 2018–19 | FIBA Europe Cup | RS | (Romania) Steaua București | 74–69 | 81–87 |
| 2018–19 | FIBA Europe Cup | 2R | (Germany) s.Oliver Würzburg | 78–91 | 95–77 |
| 2018–19 | FIBA Europe Cup | 2R | (Hungary) Szolnoki Olaj | 81–76 | 89–76 |
| 2018–19 | FIBA Europe Cup | 2R | (Turkey) Pınar Karşıyaka | 82–78 | 107–85 |
| 2018–19 | FIBA Europe Cup | R16 | (Italy) Varese | 77–80 | 100–84 |
| 2019–20 | Champions League | QR1 | (Poland) Legia | 79–81 | 85–83 |
| 2019–20 | FIBA Europe Cup | RS | (Cyprus) APOEL | 93–74 | 80–107 |
| 2019–20 | FIBA Europe Cup | RS | (Germany) medi Bayreuth | 68–93 | 97–89 |
| 2019–20 | FIBA Europe Cup | RS | (Latvia) Ventspils | 72–122 | 104–84 |
| 2022–23 | FIBA Europe Cup | QR2 | (Estonia) Kalev | N/A | 61-98 |
| 2022–23 | ENBL | GS | (Ukraine) Budivelnyk | N/A | 85-62 |
| 2022–23 | ENBL | GS | (Estonia) Kalev | 50-61 | N/A |
| 2022–23 | ENBL | GS | (Poland) Stelmet Zielona Gora | N/A | 89-76 |
| 2022–23 | ENBL | GS | (Poland) Start Lublin | 69-89 | N/A |
| 2022–23 | ENBL | GS | (Lithuania) Šiauliai | N/A | 67-91 |
| 2022–23 | ENBL | GS | (Estonia) Tal Tech | 73-91 | N/A |
| 2022–23 | ENBL | QF | (Poland) King Szczecin | 64-64 | 78-85 |

== Arena ==
The club play their home games at the smaller of the two arenas in the Pallati i Rinisë dhe Sporteve (Palace of Youth and Sports) which has a capacity of 2,800. The larger arena in the building had a capacity of around 8,000 but it was damaged by a fire on 25 February 2000 and has never been restored fully since. Commentators and fans have called for the "Greater Coliseum" to be renovated and used for the club's home games. The larger arena is expected to be renovated in time for hosting the 2030 Mediterranean Games.

== Honours and titles ==
=== Domestic competitions ===
Kosovo Basketball Superleague

- Winners (14): 1991, 2002, 2003, 2006, 2007, 2008, 2009, 2010, 2011, 2014, 2015, 2016, 2017, 2019
- Runners-up (6): 1997, 2001, 2004, 2012, 2013, 2018

Kosovo Cup

- Winners (15): 2002, 2003, 2005, 2006, 2007, 2008, 2009, 2010, 2013, 2014, 2016, 2017, 2018, 2019, 2021,
- Runners-up (4): 2011, 2015, 2023, 2024

Kosovo Supercup

- Winners (8): 2005, 2012, 2013, 2014, 2018, 2019, 2020, 2022

=== European and regional competitions ===
Liga Unike

- Runners-up (1): 2024–25

Balkan League

- Winners (3): 2015, 2016, 2024

European North Basketball League

  - Quarter Finals (1): 2022–23 European North Basketball League

FIBA Europe Cup

  - Round of 16 (1): 2018-19

FIBA Champions League

  - First qualifying round (3): 2017–18 Basketball Champions League, 2018–19 Basketball Champions League, and in the 2019-20 Basketball Champions League

== Players ==
=== Current roster ===
Note: Flags indicate national team eligibility at FIBA-sanctioned events. Players may hold other non-FIBA nationalities not displayed.

KB Prishtina roster
Players
Coaches

| Pos. | No. | Nat. | Name | Ht. | Age |
|---|---|---|---|---|---|
| C | 0 | (Kosovo) (Italy) | Sheqiri, Dion | 2.11 m (6 ft 11 in) | 23 – 25 August 2003 |
| G | 1 | (Kosovo) | Shatri, Oltijon | 1.90 m (6 ft 3 in) | 19 – 28 February 2007 |
| PG | 2 | (United States) | Golson Jr., Vincent | 1.75 m (5 ft 9 in) | 32 – 1 February 1994 |
| G/F | 4 | (Kosovo) (Croatia) | Azemi, Edmond | 2.00 m (6 ft 7 in) | 46 – 10 September 1980 |
| F/C | 7 | (Kosovo) | Zeneli, Liri | 2.07 m (6 ft 9 in) | 19 – 4 April 2007 |
| G | 9 | (United States) | Dawkins, Bryson | 1.88 m (6 ft 2 in) | 24 – 2 February 2002 |
| PF | 10 | (Nigeria) (United States) | Ogemuno-Johnson, Ajiri | 2.03 m (6 ft 8 in) | 27 – 8 August 1999 |
| PG | 11 | (Kosovo) (United States) | Armstead, Malcolm | 1.83 m (6 ft 0 in) | 37 – 1 August 1989 |
| SF | 15 | (Kosovo) | Sinani, Arber | 2.01 m (6 ft 7 in) | 26 – 13 October 2000 |
| SF | 21 | (Kosovo) | Krasniqi, Elton | 1.88 m (6 ft 2 in) | 21 – 27 February 2005 |
| PF | 30 | (United States) | Hankins-Sanford, Daniel | 2.03 m (6 ft 8 in) | 23 – 17 June 2003 |
| PF | 34 | (Kosovo) | Istrefi, Bardh | 2.07 m (6 ft 9 in) | 22 – 25 January 2004 |
| PG | 44 | (Kosovo) | Polloshka, Don | 1.75 m (5 ft 9 in) | 24 – 7 June 2002 |
| SG | 77 | (Kosovo) | Binqe, Norik | 1.95 m (6 ft 5 in) | 20 – 25 October 2005 |

Head coach

- (Croatia) Jeronimo Šarin

Assistant coach(es)

- (Kosovo) Astrit Hajrullahu

Physiotherapist(s)

- (Kosovo) Kujtim Shala

Legend

- (C) Team captain
- (TW) – Two-way contract
  (U20) – Obligatory Under 20 years old player
- Injured

- Roster
Updated: October 20, 2026

=== Depth chart ===
| Pos. | Starting 5 | Bench 1 | Bench 2 |
|---|---|---|---|
| C | Daniel Hankins-Sanford | Dion Sheqiri | Liri Zeneli |
| PF | Ajiri Ogemuno-Johnson | Bardh Istrefi |
| SF | Bryson Dawkins | Arber Sinani | Elton Krasniqi |
| SG | Malcolm Armstead | Edmond Azemi | Norik Binqe |
| PG | Vincent Golson Jr. | Don Polloshka | Oltijon Shatri |

== Head coaches ==
| Coach | Years active |
|---|---|
| (Kosovo) Ibrahim Karabegu | 1999–2000 |
| (Albania) Bujar Shehu | 2000–2001 |
| (Croatia) Čedomir Perinčić | 2001–2002 |
| (North Macedonia) Enver Sllamniku | 2002–2003 |
| (Croatia) Josip Gjergja | 2003–2004 |
| (Turkey) Ekrem Memnun | 2004–2005 |
| (Kosovo) Vllaznim Perani | 2005 |
| (Kosovo) Arben Krasniqi | 2005–2013 |
| (Turkey) Ahmet Kandemir | 2013 |
| (Turkey) Ceyhun Cabadak | 2013 |
| (North Macedonia) Marin Dokuzovski | 2014 |
| (North Macedonia) Marjan Ilievski | 2015 |
| (Cyprus) Antonis Constantinides | 2015–2016 |
| (Lithuania) Audrius Prakuraitis | 2016–2017 |
| (Turkey) Ahmet Kandemir | 2017 |
| (Kosovo) Andin Rashica | 2018 |
| (Germany) Matthias Zollner | 2018 |
| (Croatia) (Bosnia and Herzegovina) Damir Mulaomerović | 2018–2019 |
| (Kosovo) Bujar Loci | 2019 |
| (Slovenia) Teo Hojc | 2020 |
| (Kosovo) Andin Rashica | 2020 |
| (Croatia) Ante Nazor | 2021–2022 |
| (Turkey) Ekrem Memnun | 2022 |
| (Turkey) Murat Bilge | 2022 |
| (Turkey) Ahmet Kandemir | 2022–2023 |
| (Lithuania) Žydrūnas Urbonas | 2023–2024 |
| (Croatia) Jakša Vulić | 2024 |
| (Kosovo) Albert Sylejmani | 2024 |
| (Turkey) Murat Bilge | 2024–2026 |
| (Croatia) Jeronimo Šarin | 2026–present |

== Notable players ==
Note: Flags indicate national team eligibility at FIBA-sanctioned events. Players may hold other non-FIBA nationalities not displayed.

Criteria

To appear in this section a player must have either:

- Set a club record or won an individual award while at the club
- Played at least one official international match for their national team at any time
- Played at least one official NBA match at any time.

Kosovo & Albania

- (Kosovo) (Albania) Florian Miftari
- (Kosovo) Florent Lila
- (Kosovo) (United States) Malcolm Armstead
- (Kosovo) (Montenegro) Mikaile Tmušić
- (Kosovo) Granit Rugova
- (Kosovo) (United States) Samir Šaptahović
- (Kosovo) Lis Shoshi
- (Kosovo) Valentin Spaqi
- (Kosovo) Yll Kaçaniku
- (Kosovo) (Slovenia) Gezim Morina
- (Kosovo) (Socialist Federal Republic of Yugoslavia) Ferit Zekolli
- (Albania) Gerti Shima
- (Albania) (Luxembourg) Erkand Karaj
- (Albania) (Kosovo) Ersid Ljuca

Europe

- (North Macedonia) Gjorgji Čekovski
- (North Macedonia) Pero Blazevski
- (North Macedonia) Bojan Trajkovski
- (North Macedonia) (Kosovo) Lejson Zeqiri
- (Bosnia and Herzegovina) Edin Bavčić
- (Belgium) Khalid Boukichou
- (Lithuania) Aurimas Kieža
- (Lithuania) Denis Krestinin
- (Bulgaria) Stanimir Marinov
- (United Kingdom) Andrew Lawrence
- (Sweden) Thomas Massamba
- (Latvia) Andrejs Selakovs
- (Montenegro) Nikola Vučurović

United States

- (United States) Tarvis Williams
- (United States) Fuquan Edwin
- (United States) K'Zell Wesson
- (United States) Khalid El-Amin
- (United States) Abdul Shamsid-Deen
- (United States) Jamar Anthony Diggs
- (United States) Jordan Hulls
- (United States) (Bulgaria) Jason Washburn
- (United States) (Albania) Mike Moser
- (United States) Kyan Anderson

Africa

- (Cameroon) Gaston Essengue
- (Ghana) (United States) Alhaji Mohammed

Asia

- (Iraq) (United States) DeMario Mayfield
