= Kosovo Cup (basketball) =

- Organising body: Basketball Federation of Kosovo
- Founded: 1991; 35 years ago
- First season: 1991–92
- Country: Kosovo
- Confederation: FIBA Europe (Europe)
- Number of teams: 23
- Current champions: Trepça (9th title) (2026)
- Most championships: Prishtina (15 titles)
- TV partners: Kujtesa, ArtMotion
- Website: www.basketbolli.com

The Kosovo Cup (Albanian: Kupa e Kosovës) is an annual professional basketball competition between clubs from Kosovo. Founded in 1991, it is run by the Basketball Federation of Kosovo.

On group phase, teams are divided in four groups, winners are qualified in Final Four.

== Competition finals ==
Venue	Location	Winner	Result	Finalist
1991–92	-	Vëllaznimi	:	?
1992–93	-	Trepça	:	?
1993–94	-	Peja	70:47	Besa Podujevë
1994–95	-	Peja	71:67	Sharri
1995–96	-	Vëllaznimi	:	?
1996–97	-	Peja	71:63	Bashkimi
1997–98	The competition interrupted because of the war in Kosovo			
1998–99	The competition not held due to war in Kosovo			
1999–00	-	Trepça	:	?
2000–01	Prizren	Bashkimi	93:83	Peja
2001–02	Mitrovica	Prishtina	73:68	Bashkimi
2002–03	Pristina	MEB Prishtina	90:72	QMI Bashkimi
2003–04	Pristina	Trepça	103:74	KB Universiteti
2004–05	Pristina	Sigal Prishtina	92:71	Trepça
2005–06	Peja	Sigal Prishtina	84:71	Peja
2006–07	Suva Reka	Sigal Prishtina	91:77	AS Prishtina
2007–08	-	Sigal Prishtina	95:77	Peja
2008–09	-	Sigal Prishtina	96:86	Peja
2009–10	Mitrovica	Sigal Prishtina	70:59	Trepça
2010–11	Pristina	Peja	98:84	Sigal Prishtina
2011–12	Peja	Trepça	86:71	Bashkimi
2012–13	Prizren	Sigal Prishtina	55:54	Peja
2013–14	Gjakova	Sigal Prishtina	92:65	Bashkimi
2014–15	Suva Reka	Peja	70:66	Sigal Prishtina
2015–16	Pristina	Sigal Prishtina	81:78	Peja
2016–17	Mitrovica	Sigal Prishtina	77:66	Peja
2017–18	Suva Reka	Bashkimi	74:77	Sigal Prishtina
2018–19	Rahovec	Prishtina	96:60	Rahoveci
2019–20	Rahovec	Peja	79:64	Ylli
2020–21	Suva Reka	Sigal Prishtina	82:76	Ylli
2021–22	Peja	Trepça	76:62	Bashkimi
2022–23	Rahovec	Trepça	74:66	Sigal Prishtina
2023–24	Gjakova	Trepça	71:69	Sigal Prishtina
2024–25	Pristina	Trepça	85:79	Bashkimi
2025–26	Rahovec	Trepça	91:72	Bashkimi

== Titles by club ==
Club	Cups	Years
Prishtina	15	2002, 2003, 2005, 2006, 2007, 2008, 2009, 2010, 2013, 2014, 2016, 2017, 2018, 2019, 2021
Trepça	9	1993, 2000, 2004, 2012, 2022, 2023, 2024, 2025, 2026
Peja	6	1994, 1995, 1997, 2011, 2015, 2020
Vëllaznimi	2	1992, 1996
Bashkimi	1	2001
