= Kosovo Basketball Superleague =

Top men's professional basketball league in Kosovo

- Organising body: Basketball Federation of Kosovo
- Founded: 1991; 35 years ago
- First season: 1991–92
- Country: Kosovo
- Confederation: FIBA Europe (Europe)
- Number of teams: 8
- Level on pyramid: 1
- Relegation to: Kosovo First League
- Domestic cup: Kosovo Cup
- Current champions: Trepça (7th title) (2025–26)
- Most championships: Prishtina (14 titles)
- Commissioner: Faton Kurshumlija
- President: Arben Fetahu
- TV partners: Art MotionList of broadcasters
- Website: Kosovo First League
- 2025–26 Kosovo Basketball Superleague

The Kosovo Basketball Superleague (Albanian: Superliga e Kosovës në Basketboll), and known as the ProCredit Superliga due to sponsorship reasons, is the top men's professional basketball league in Kosovo. Basketball Superleague was founded in 1991. It is run by the Basketball Federation of Kosovo.

Prishtina holds the record for most Superleague titles as it has won the championship 14 times.

== Current teams ==
Kosovo Basketball Superleague – Club Locations

| Team | City | Venue | Capacity |
|---|---|---|---|
| Bashkimi | Prizren | Salla e sporteve "Sezai Surroi" | 2500 |
| Bora | Pristina | Pallati i Rinisë dhe Sporteve | 1800 |
| Prishtina | Pristina | Pallati i Rinisë dhe Sporteve | 1800 |
| Peja | Peja | Karagaq Sports Hall | 3000 |
| Trepça | Mitrovica | Salla e sporteve Minatori | 3000 |
| Golden Eagle Ylli | Suhareka | Salla e sporteve "13 Qërshori" | 1800 |
| Proton Cable Prizreni | Prizren | Salla e sporteve "Sezai Surroi" | 2500 |
| Vëllaznimi | Gjakova | Palestra Sportive "Shani Nushi" | 2500 |

== Rules ==
=== Competition format ===
It consists of eight to ten teams which compete each year in two separate phases. Each team has to play all the other teams in its division four times, twice at home and twice away. This means that in Kosovo basketball, the league's regular season ends after all teams play 28 matches.

At the end of the league, the four best teams in the standings start a play-off, pitting the first place team in the standings versus the 4th place team in the standings, and so on. There is one playoff rounds, and the winner of the finals round becomes the champion of the Kosovo Basketball Superleague. This is similar to the most basketball leagues in Europe.

Each season, the last qualified team of the regular season relegates to Kosovo Basketball First League and replaced by champion of the First League whilst second from last of Superleague meats the runner up of the First League in e Relegation Playoff.

=== Foreigners ===
Each team can play 3 foreign players in every match that is organized by BFK.

=== Youngsters ===
Every team must play two U20 players in every game for at least 20 min otherwise the teams are fined 500 €.

=== Arena standards ===
Since the establishment of the league, the indoor courts in Kosovo have seen continuous improvements in capacity and facilities, with some municipalities have built and newly built stadiums for basketball clubs in their areas as well as other sports. Today, the facilities of the clubs participating in Kosovo Basketball Superleague and hosting the home matches, must have a minimum capacity of 1,000 people.

== History ==
Despite the political status of Kosovo, basketball competitions have been legally organized since 1999 under the Basketball Federation of Kosovo licensed by the United Nations Mission in Kosovo and the Government of Kosovo. However, the KBF has functioned since 1991 and organized amateur basketball leagues.

Today, basketball in Kosovo shares the same popularity with football.

=== Names of the competition ===
- 1999–2004: Liga e Pare e Kosoves ne Basketboll
- 2004–2005: Liga Profesionale e Basketbollit te Kosoves
- 2005–2007: Raiffeisen Superliga
- 2007–2009: Siguria Superliga
- 2009–2011: Techno Market Superliga
- 2011–2013: BKT Superliga
- 2013–2017: ETC Superliga
- 2017–2020: IP Superliga
- 2020-2021: FiveStar Superliga
- 2021-2022: ArtMotion Superliga
- 2022–2024: PrinceCaffe Superliga
- 2024–present: ProCredit Superliga

=== Commissioners ===
- 2006–2011: Nuredin Ibishi
- 2013–Present: Bajrush Ademi

== Other competitions ==
- Kosovo Cup
- Champions League
- FIBA Europe Cup
- Balkan International Basketball League

== Winner by season ==
Here is the list of the champions of Kosovo year by year

| Season | Winner | Runner–up | Score |
|---|---|---|---|
| 1991–92 | Prishtina | Vëllaznimi | 1–0 |
| 1992–93 | Trepça | Peja | 1–0 |
| 1993–94 | Peja | Trepça | 1–0 |
| 1994–95 | Peja | Ylli | 2–0 |
| 1995–96 | Peja | Vëllaznimi | 2–0 |
| 1996–97 | Drita | Prishtina | |
| 1997–98 | Competition interrupted due to the war in Kosovo | | |
| 1998–99 | Not held due to war in Kosovo | | |
| 1999–00 | Trepça | Peja | 3–1 |
| 2000–01 | Trepça | Prishtina | |
| 2001–02 | Prishtina | Trepça | 3–2 |
| 2002–03 | Prishtina | Mabetex | 3–1 |
| 2003–04 | Dukagjini | Prishtina | 3–0 |
| 2004–05 | Mabetex | Dukagjini | 3–2 |
| 2005–06 | Prishtina | Mabetex | 3–1 |
| 2006–07 | Prishtina | Trepça | 4–1 |
| 2007–08 | Prishtina | Peja | 4–2 |
| 2008–09 | Prishtina | Bashkimi | 3–2 |
| 2009–10 | Prishtina | Trepça | 3–1 |
| 2010-11 | Prishtina | Peja | 3–0 |
| 2011-12 | Trepça | Prishtina | 3–2 |
| 2012-13 | Peja | Prishtina | 3–0 |
| 2013–14 | Prishtina | Peja | 3–0 |
| 2014–15 | Prishtina | Peja | 2–1 |
| 2015–16 | Prishtina | Peja | 3–1 |
| 2016–17 | Prishtina | Bashkimi | 3–1 |
| 2017–18 | Bashkimi | Prishtina | 3–1 |
| 2018–19 | Prishtina | Rahoveci | 3–1 |
| 2019–20 | Competition interrupted due to the COVID-19 | | |
| 2020–21 | Ylli | Peja | 3–0 |
| 2021–22 | Ylli | Trepça | 3–1 |
| 2022–23 | Peja | Trepça | 3–2 |
| 2023–24 | Trepça | Ylli | 3–2 |
| 2024–25 | Trepça | Bashkimi | 4–2 |
| 2025–26 | Trepça | Bashkimi | 4–0 |

=== Titles by Club ===
| Club | Winners | Runners-up | Years won |
|---|---|---|---|
| Prishtina | 14 | 6 | 1992, 2002, 2003, 2006, 2007, 2008, 2009, 2010, 2011, 2014, 2015, 2016, 2017, 2019 |
| Trepça | 7 | 6 | 1993, 2000, 2001, 2012, 2024, 2025, 2026 |
| Peja | 6 | 9 | 1994, 1995, 1996, 2004, 2013, 2023 |
| Ylli | 2 | 2 | 2021, 2022 |
| Bashkimi | 1 | 3 | 2018 |
| Mabetex | 1 | 2 | 2005 |
| Drita | 1 | 0 | 1997 |
| Rahoveci | – | 1 | – |

== Sponsorships and broadcasting rights ==
Official sponsors

- IP Petrol
- TEB Bank
- STOBI FLIPS
- Rugove
- Baker Tilly Kosovo
- Global CT Digital Kosovo

Official broadcasters

- ArtMotion
- Kujtesa
- Klan Kosova

== See also ==
- Kosovo national basketball team
- Basketball Federation of Kosovo
- Kosovo Cup
