= Lior Lubin =

Israeli basketball coach and player (1977–2024)

Lior Lubin ליאור ליובין
Personal information
- Born: 19 September 1977 Ramat Gan, Israel
- Died: 22 January 2024 (aged 46)

Career information
- Playing career: 1995–2008
- Position: Point guard

Career history

Playing
- 1995–1997: Maccabi Petah Tikva
- 1997–2002: Ironi Ramat Gan
- 2002–2003: Maccabi Tel Aviv
- 2003–2004: Hapoel Tel Aviv
- 2004–2006: Azovmash
- 2006: Apollon Patras
- 2006–2007: CSKA Sofia

Coaching
- 2008–2010: Hapoel Gilboa Galil (assistant)
- 2010–2013: Hapoel Gilboa Galil
- 2013: Hapoel Holon
- 2014: Maccabi Ashdod
- 2014–2017: Israel (assistant)
- 2016–2017: Maccabi Tel Aviv (assistant)
- 2019–2021: Hapoel Gilboa Galil
- 2021: Panathinaikos (assistant)
- 2021–2022: Ironi Ness Ziona
- 2022–2023: Hapoel Be'er Sheva

Career highlights
- As Player: Israeli League champion (2003); Israeli League Assists Leader (2000); As Coach: 3× Balkan League champion (2012, 2013, 2023); Israeli Cup winner (2017)

Lior Lubin (Hebrew: ליאור ליובין; 19 September 1977 – 22 January 2024) was an Israeli professional basketball coach and onetime national team player. He was born in Ramat Gan, Israel. In 2000, he was the Israeli Premier League Assists Leader. His last coaching position was for Hapoel Be'er Sheva of the Israeli Basketball Premier League.

Lubin died from cancer on 22 January 2024, at the age of 46. He left behind a wife and three children.
