= Levski Sofia (sports club) =

Bulgarian sports club

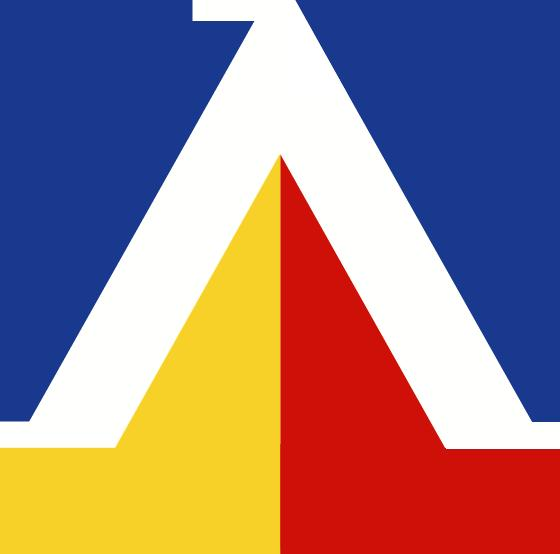
- Founded: 1914
- Location: Sofia, Bulgaria
- Colours: Blue, White, Gold
- Website: Club home page

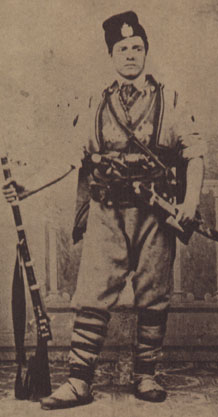
Vasil Levski, club's patron

Levski Sofia (Bulgarian: Левски София) is a Bulgarian sports club based in Sofia. It was founded in 1914. The club is named after Vasil Levski, the national hero of Bulgaria.

The club develops 30 types of sports. Its football team, PFC Levski Sofia, is its most popular section. Other important sections are BC Levski Sofia, the basketball team, and VC Levski Sofia, the volleyball team. Levski is the only Bulgarian club, and one of the few in Europe, to have won the European Champions' Cup in three different team sports – basketball, volleyball and athletics.

To date, Levski has reached 27 European Finals in total (won nine titles) – one EuroLeague, one CEV Champions League, two European Champion Clubs Cup (athletics) titles, two EuroCup titles, and three Balkan League titles; and was runner-up in (18 finals) – three CEV Champions League Finals, two European Champion Clubs Cup (athletics) Finals, six CEV Cup Winners' Cup Finals, one EuroCup Final, one CELA Cup Final, two Balkan League Finals, two Balkans Cup Finals, and one Intertoto Cup Ernst Thommen Final. The athletes of Levski have won almost 1,000 medals from Olympic Games, World Championships and European Championships, which makes Levski one of the most successful European sports clubs of all time.

== Football ==
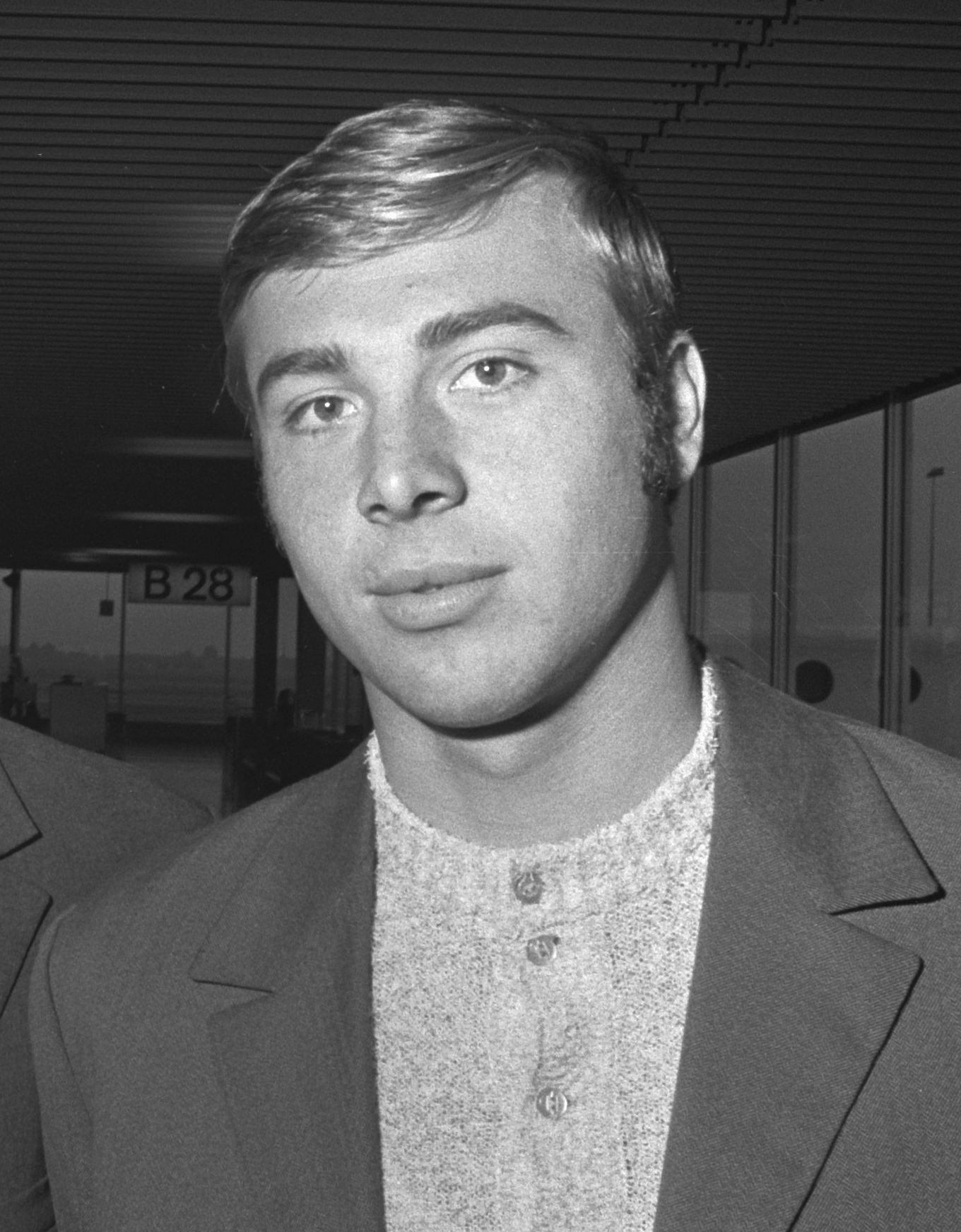
Pavel Panov, Levski's top goalscorer in European competitions

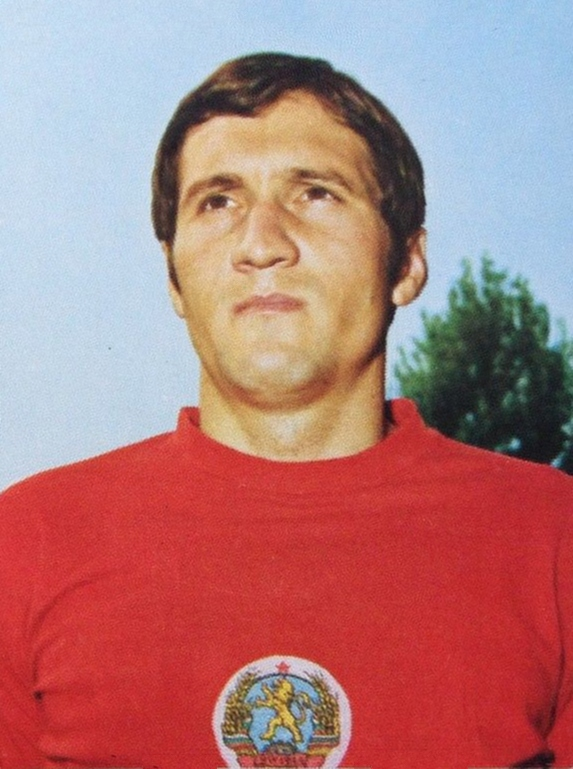
Stefan Aladzhov, Levski's most capped player

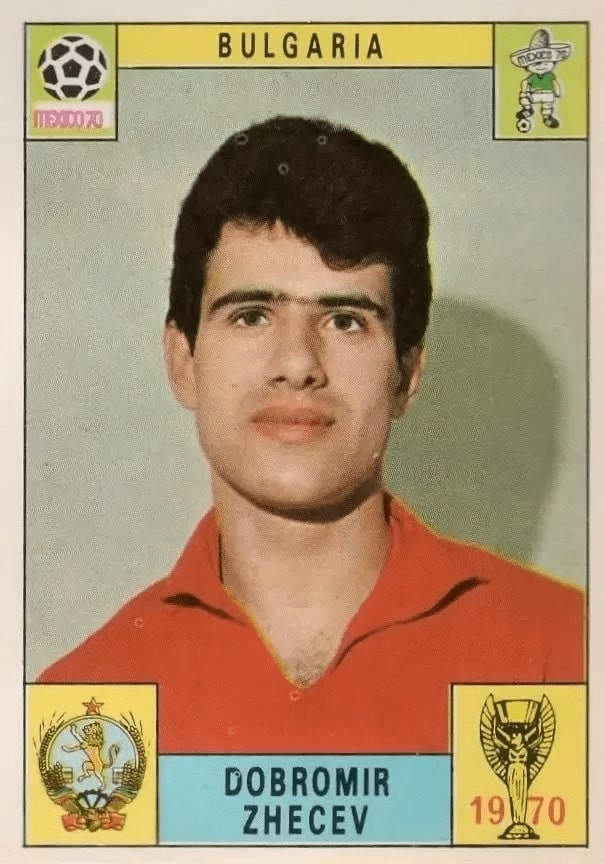
Dobromir Zhechev, played in four FIFA World Cups

Bulgarian A Group : 27

- 1933, 1937, 1942, 1946, 1947, 1949, 1950, 1953, 1965, 1968, 1970, 1974, 1977, 1979, 1984, 1985, 1988, 1993, 1994, 1995, 2000, 2001, 2002, 2006, 2007, 2009, 2026

Bulgarian Cup : 26

- 1942, 1946, 1947, 1949, 1950, 1956, 1957, 1959, 1967, 1970, 1971, 1976, 1977, 1979, 1984, 1986, 1991, 1992, 1994, 1998, 2000, 2002, 2003, 2005, 2007, 2022

Sofia Championship : 11

- 1923, 1924, 1925, 1929, 1933, 1937, 1942, 1943, 1945, 1946, 1948

Tsar's Cup / Cup of the Soviet Army / Cup of Bulgaria : 6

- 1933, 1937, 1982, 1984, 1987, 1988

Ulpia Serdika Cup : 4

- 1926, 1930, 1931, 1932

Bulgarian Supercup : 3

- 2005, 2007, 2009

Double : 13

- 1942, 1946, 1947, 1949, 1950, 1970, 1977, 1979, 1984, 1994, 2000, 2002, 2007

Treble : 4

- 1942, 1946, 1984, 2007

UEFA Europa League, UEFA Cup Winners' Cup 1/4 Finals : 1969–70, 1975–76, 1976–77, 1986–87, 2005–06

UCL, UEL Group Stage / League phase : 2005–06, 2006–07, 2009–10, 2010–11, 2026–27

Balkans Cup Runners-Up : 1960–61, 1961–63

Intertoto Cup Ernst Thommen Runners-Up : 1981

== Basketball ==
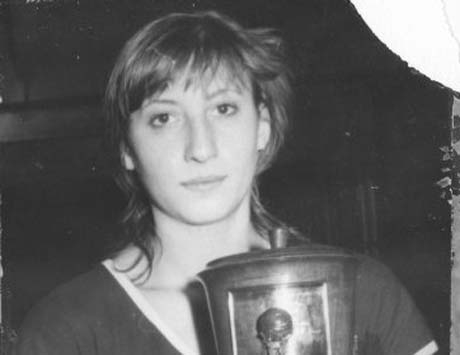
Krassimira Banova with the European Champions Cup (1984)

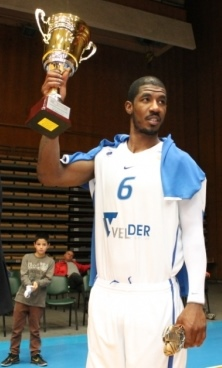
Aaron Harper with the 2010 Balkan League

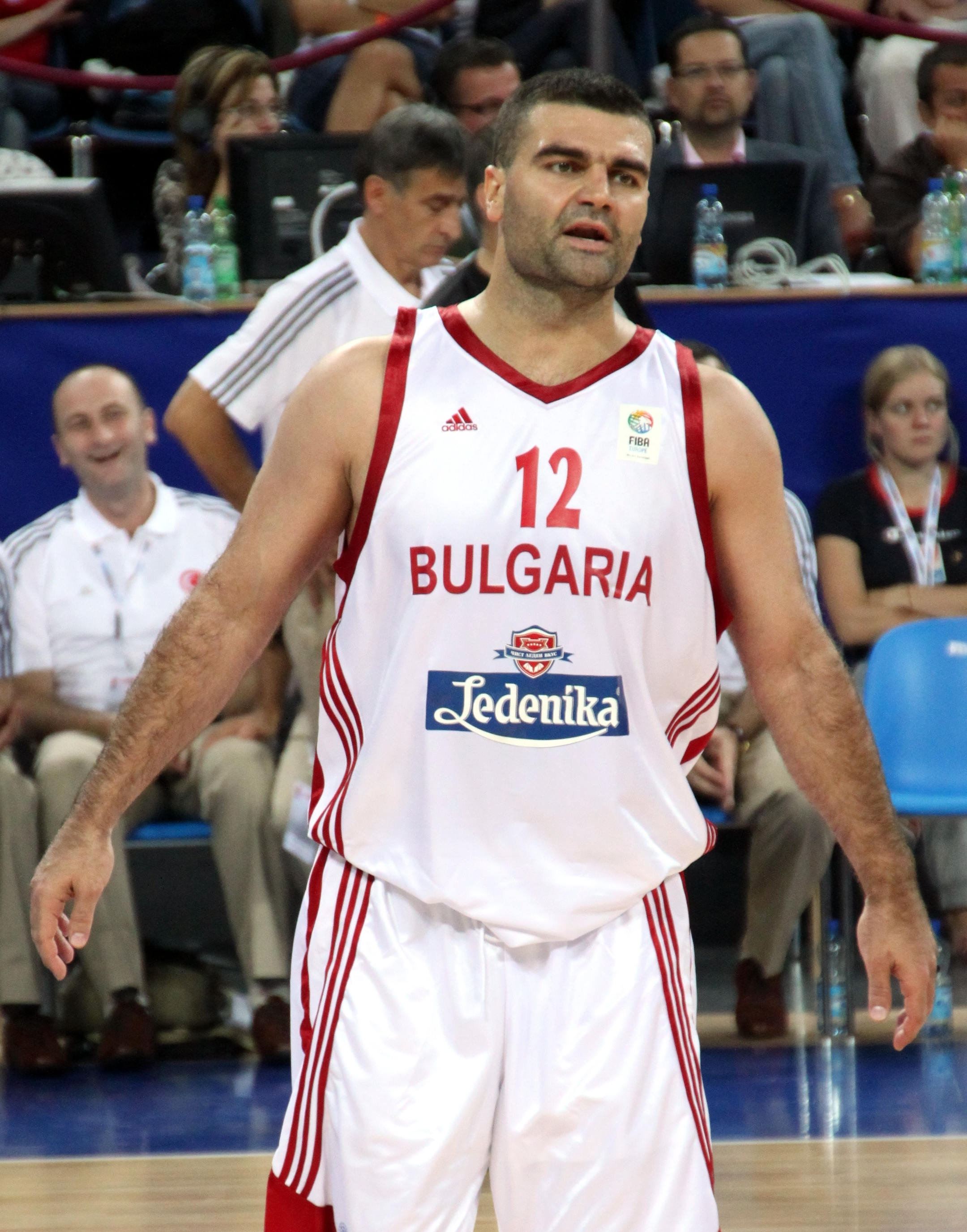
Vassil Evtimov representing Bulgaria

=== Men ===
National Basketball League : 16

- 1942, 1945, 1946, 1947, 1978, 1979, 1981, 1982, 1986, 1993, 1994, 2000, 2001, 2014, 2018, 2021

Bulgarian Cup : 16

- 1969, 1971, 1972, 1976, 1979, 1980, 1982, 1983, 1993, 2001, 2009, 2010, 2014, 2019, 2020, 2023

Bulgarian Basketball Super Cup : 3

- 2018, 2019, 2023

Double : 5

- 1979, 1982, 1993, 2001, 2014

Treble : 1

- 2014

Balkan League : 3

- Winners : 2010, 2014, 2018

=== Women ===
Bulgarian Champions : 8

- 1980, 1983, 1984, 1985, 1986, 1987, 1988, 1994

Bulgarian Cup : 13

- 1969, 1972, 1974, 1976, 1977, 1980, 1982, 1983, 1985, 1986, 1987, 1989, 1991

Double : 5

- 1980, 1983, 1985, 1986, 1987

EuroLeague

- Winners : 1984

Ronchetti Cup / EuroCup

- Winners : 1978, 1979
  - Runners-Up : 1975

== Volleyball ==
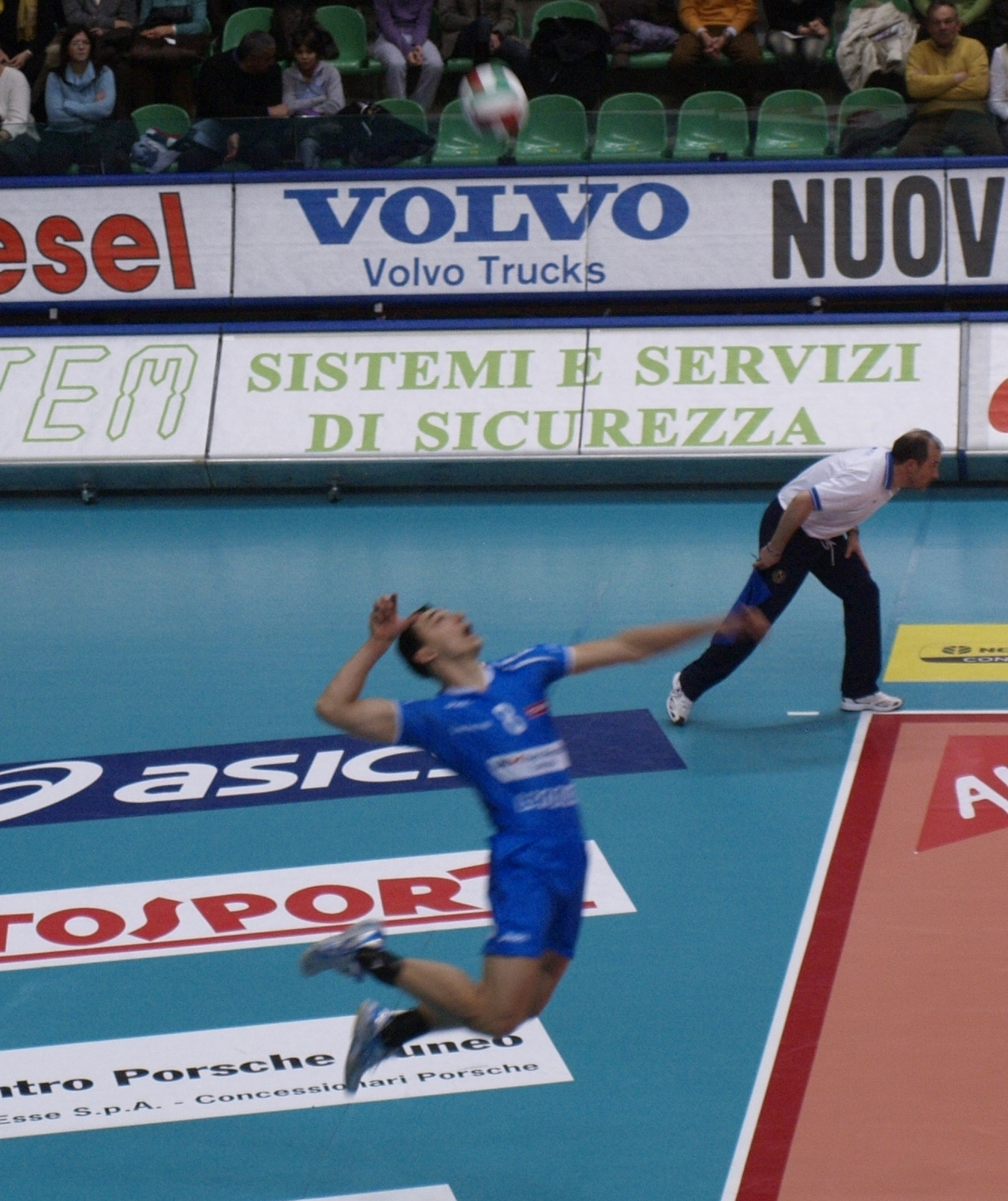
Vladimir Nikolov, 2006 FIVB World Championship Bronze medalist

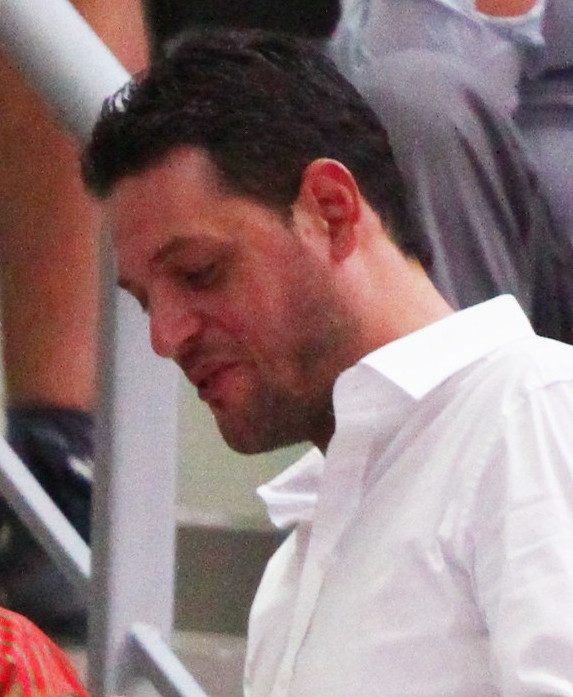
Plamen Konstantinov, 2007 FIVB World Cup Bronze medalist

=== Men ===
Bulgarian Champions : 18

- 1945, 1959, 1980, 1985, 1992, 1997, 1999, 2000, 2001, 2002, 2003, 2004, 2005, 2006, 2009, 2024, 2025, 2026

Bulgarian Cup : 18

- 1960, 1966, 1968, 1972, 1980, 1983, 1987, 1989, 1996, 1997, 2000, 2001, 2003, 2004, 2006, 2012, 2014, 2025

Bulgarian Super Cup : 4

- 2023, 2024, 2025, 2026

Double : 8

- 1980, 1997, 2000, 2001, 2003, 2004, 2006, 2025

CEV Cup Winners' Cup / CEV Cup

- Runners-Up : 6
  - 1975, 1979, 1982, 1985, 1987, 1989

=== Women ===
Bulgarian Champions : 28

- 1959, 1962, 1963, 1964, 1965, 1966, 1967, 1970, 1971, 1972, 1973, 1974, 1975, 1976, 1977, 1980, 1981, 1984, 1990, 1996, 1997, 1998, 1999, 2001, 2002, 2003, 2009, 2014

Bulgarian Cup : 27

- 1959, 1960, 1961, 1966, 1967, 1970, 1972, 1973, 1974, 1978, 1980, 1987, 1990, 1991, 1992, 1994, 1997, 1998, 1999, 2001, 2002, 2003, 2005, 2006, 2009, 2014, 2016

Double : 17

- 1959, 1966, 1967, 1970, 1972, 1973, 1974, 1980, 1990, 1997, 1998, 1999, 2001, 2002, 2003, 2009, 2014

CEV Champions League

- Winners : 1964
  - Runners-Up : 3
    - 1975, 1976, 1981

== Hockey ==
Bulgarian Hockey League : 13

- 1976, 1977, 1978, 1979, 1980, 1981, 1982, 1989, 1990, 1992, 1995, 1999, 2003

Bulgarian Cup : 17

- 1968, 1974, 1977, 1979, 1980, 1982, 1984, 1985, 1988, 1989, 1990, 1991, 1995, 1996, 1999, 2000, 2005

Double : 8

- 1977, 1979, 1980, 1982, 1989, 1990, 1995, 1999

== Medals and athletes ==
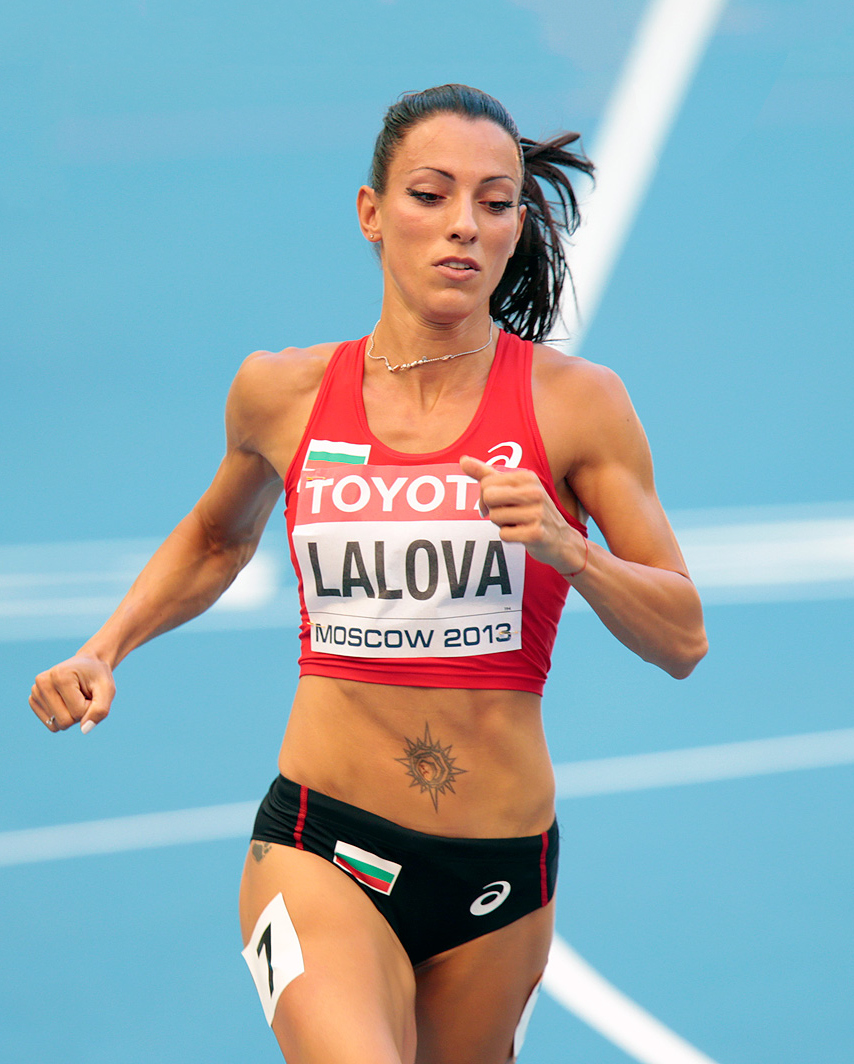
Ivet Lalova

Competition	Gold	Silver	Bronze	Total
Summer Olympics	15	42	26	83
World Championships	107	107	156	370
European Championships	159	151	164	474
Total number of medals	281	300	346	927

Levski Sofia athletes:

- Boyan Radev
- Enyu Valchev
- Ivanka Khristova
- Yanko Rusev
- Valentin Raychev
- Vania Gesheva
- Yordanka Donkova
- Lubomir Geraskov
- Tanyu Kiryakov
- Daniel Petrov
- Mariya Grozdeva
- Georgi Markov
- Ivet Lalova
- Aleksandar Tomov
- Stanka Zlateva
- Serafim Barzakov
- Yordanka Blagoeva
- Radoslav Velikov
- Maria Petrova
- Lilia Ignatova
- Anelia Ralenkova
- Petkana Makaveeva
- Atanas Golomeev
- Petar Stoychev
- Elitsa Yankova
- Georgi Mladenov
- Tervel Pulev

== Supporters ==
Levski is the most popular club in Bulgaria. The club has various rivalries in the domestic competitions. Levski fans maintain a friendship with Lazio fans and have Bulgarian nationalist views.

== European competitions history ==
The Cyrillic letter L, symbol of Levski

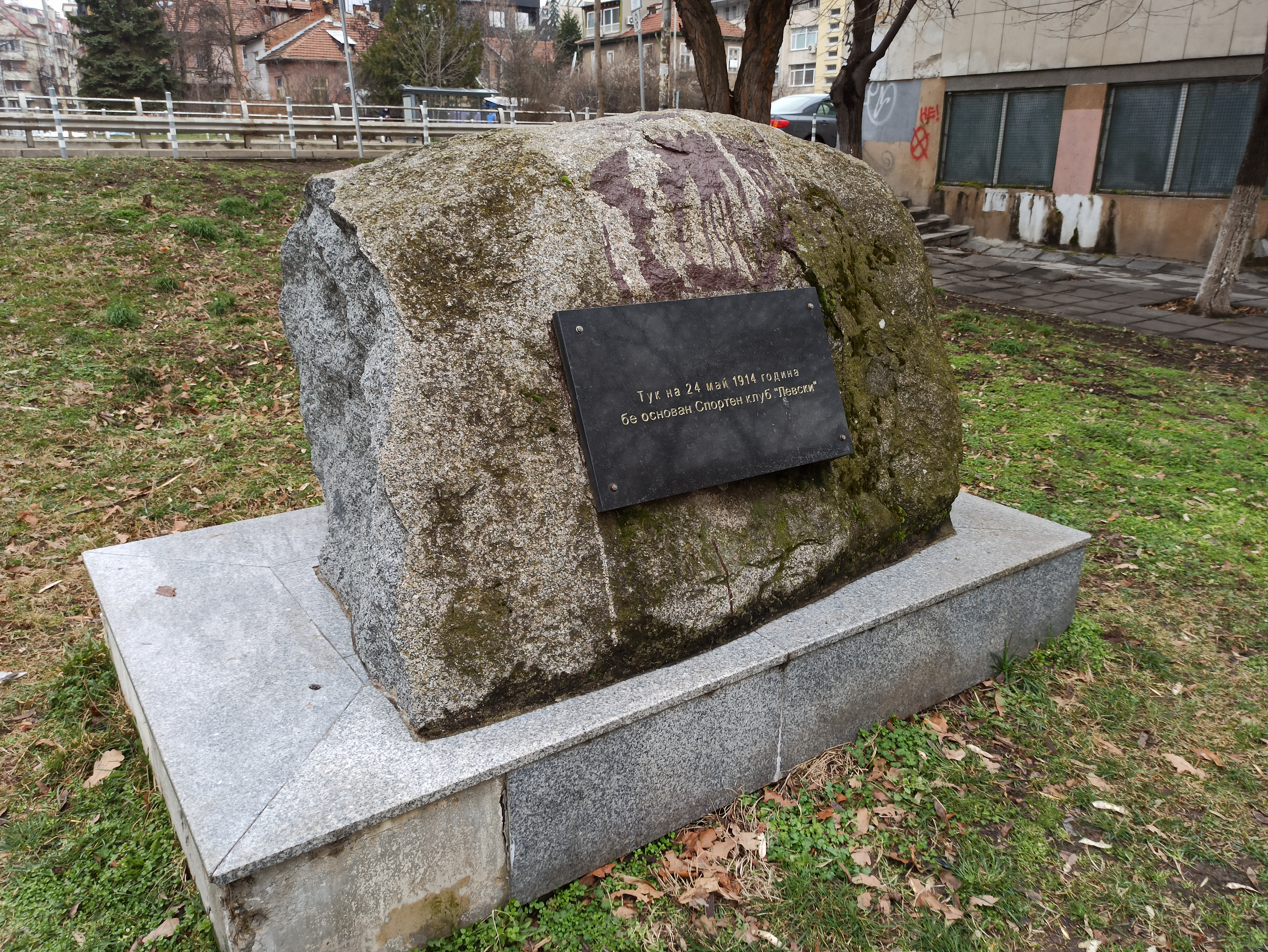
Monument, marking the place of creation of Sport Club Levski Sofia, near the National Palace of Culture in the city center

Sport	Competition	Result	Year
Football	Balkans Cup	Runners-up	1961
Football	Balkans Cup	Runners-up	1963
Volleyball	CEV Champions League	Champions	1964
Basketball	EuroCup	Runners-up	1975
Volleyball	CEV Champions League	Runners-up	1975
Volleyball	CEV Cup	Runners-up	1975
Volleyball	CEV Champions League	Runners-up	1976
Basketball	EuroCup	Champions	1978
Volleyball	CEV Cup	Runners-up	1979
Basketball	EuroCup	Champions	1979
Volleyball	CEV Champions League	Runners-up	1981
Football	Intertoto Cup Ernst Thommen	Runners-up	1981
Volleyball	CEV Cup	Runners-up	1982
Basketball	EuroLeague	Champions	1984
Volleyball	CEV Cup	Runners-up	1985
Volleyball	CEV Cup	Runners-up	1987
Volleyball	CEV Cup	Runners-up	1989
Athletics	European Champion Clubs Cup	Champions	1992
Athletics	European Champion Clubs Cup	Runners-up	1993
Athletics	European Champion Clubs Cup	Champions	1994
Athletics	European Champion Clubs Cup	Runners-up	1995
Wrestling	CELA Cup	Runners-up	2009
Basketball	Balkan League	Champions	2010
Basketball	Balkan League	Runners-up	2012
Basketball	Balkan League	Runners-up	2013
Basketball	Balkan League	Champions	2014
Basketball	Balkan League	Champions	2018

== See also ==
- Bulgaria men's national volleyball team
- Bulgaria women's national volleyball team
- Bulgaria men's national basketball team
- Bulgaria women's national basketball team
- Bulgaria national football team
- Bulgaria men's national ice hockey team
- Bulgaria at the Olympics
