= 2020–21 BIBL season =

Basketball season

2020–21 BIBL
- League: Balkan International Basketball League
- Season: 2020–21
- Dates: 13 October 2020 – 29 April 2021
- Games played: 72
- Teams: 18
- TV partner(s): sportmedia.tv YouTube; RTSH

Finals
- Champions: (Israel) Hapoel Holon (1st title)
- Runners-up: (Bulgaria) Academic Plovdiv
- Semifinalists: (Israel) Hapoel Gilboa Galil (Bulgaria) Beroe

Seasons
- ← 2019–20 2021–22 →
- All statistics correct as of 29 April 2021.

The 2020–21 BIBL season is the 12th edition of Balkan International Basketball League (BIBL). Besides 6 teams from Bulgaria, Montenegro and North Macedonia, 12 teams from Israel joined the competition, after temporary suspension of 2020-2021 Israeli Basketball League due to the COVID-19 pandemic. These 12 teams played inside of Israel in first round of regular season and the best two teams joined the other 4 Balkan teams, which qualified from the Balkan group.

== Teams ==
Regular season
(Israel) Bnei Herzliya	(Israel) Hapoel Holon	(Israel) Maccabi Haifa	(Montenegro) Teodo Tivat
(Israel) Hapoel Be'er Sheva	(Israel) Hapoel Jerusalem	(Israel) Maccabi Rishon LeZion	(North Macedonia) Kumanovo 2009
(Israel) Hapoel Eilat	(Israel) Hapoel Tel Aviv	(Bulgaria) Academic Plovdiv	(North Macedonia) TFT Skopje
(Israel) Hapoel Gilboa Galil	(Israel) Ironi Nahariya	(Bulgaria) Beroe	
(Israel) Hapoel Haifa	(Israel) Ironi Nes Ziona	(Montenegro) Ibar Rožaje	

== First round ==
=== Group A ===
Pos	Team	Pld	W	L	PF	PA	PD	Pts	Qualification	HTA	HER	HHA
1	(Israel) Hapoel Tel Aviv	4	3	1	333	312	+21	7	Advance to Second round playoff game	—	77–67	90–94
2	(Israel) Bnei Herzliya	4	2	2	327	311	+16	6		78–87	—	92–76
3	(Israel) Hapoel Haifa	4	1	3	314	351	−37	5		73–79	71–90	—

Source: 2020–21 BIBL Group A results

=== Group B ===
Pos	Team	Pld	W	L	PF	PA	PD	Pts	Qualification	HGG	NAH	MHA
1	(Israel) Hapoel Gilboa Galil	4	4	0	358	324	+34	8	Advance to Second round playoff game	—	77–72	92–81
2	(Israel) Ironi Nahariya	4	2	2	334	341	−7	6		89–103	—	87–81
3	(Israel) Maccabi Haifa	4	0	4	324	351	−27	4		86–82	80–86	—

Source: 2020–21 BIBL Group B results

=== Group C ===
Pos	Team	Pld	W	L	PF	PA	PD	Pts	Qualification	HOL	EIL	INZ
1	(Israel) Hapoel Holon	4	4	0	393	330	+63	8	Advance to Second round playoff game	—	105–102	100–79
2	(Israel) Hapoel Eilat	4	2	2	358	373	−15	6		76–94	—	93–90
3	(Israel) Ironi Nes Ziona	4	0	4	326	374	−48	4		73–94	84–87	—

Source: 2020–21 BIBL Group C results

=== Group D ===
Pos	Team	Pld	W	L	PF	PA	PD	Pts	Qualification	MRL	JER	HBS
1	(Israel) Maccabi Rishon LeZion	4	3	1	360	346	+14	7	Advance to Second round playoff game	—	96–103	89–85
2	(Israel) Hapoel Jerusalem	4	2	2	339	328	+11	6		73–79	—	90–77
3	(Israel) Hapoel Be'er Sheva	4	1	3	323	348	−25	5		85–96	76–73	—

Source: 2020–21 BIBL Group D results

=== Group E ===
Pos	Team	Pld	W	L	PF	PA	PD	Pts	Qualification	APL	KUM	BER	TFT	TEO	IBR
1	(Bulgaria) Academic Plovdiv	10	8	2	818	800	+18	18	Advance to Second round	—	79–96	89–88	80–75	77–65	72–59
2	(North Macedonia) Kumanovo 2009	10	6	4	824	814	+10	16	Advance to Second round	86–71	—	93–80	90–83	78–83	79–81
3	(Bulgaria) Beroe	10	5	5	878	803	+75	15	Advance to Second round	85–86	105–76	—	108–73	99–77	74–67
4	(North Macedonia) TFT Skopje	10	4	6	853	866	−13	14	Advance to Second round	102–104	83–54	80–75	—	104–86	91–75
5	(Montenegro) Teodo Tivat	10	4	6	807	841	−34	14		80–86	83–90	74–70	98–83	—	85–72
6	(Montenegro) Ibar Rožaje	10	3	7	750	806	−56	13		64–74	66–82	88–94	96–76	82–76	—

Source: 2020–21 BIBL Group E results

== Second round playoff ==
The winners from groups A, B, C and D will compete in a single match to qualify for the second round. The Group A winner will play against the Group C winner, and the Group B winner will play against the winner from Group D.

The hosting team will be decided based the following criteria in the Group stage:

1. win–loss record
2. game points difference
3. game points scored.

If these criteria still cannot decide, a draw shall decide on the final classification.

Team 1	Score	Team 2
Hapoel Holon (Israel)	77–66	(Israel) Hapoel Tel Aviv
Maccabi Rishon LeZion (Israel)	78–85	(Israel) Hapoel Gilboa Galil

== Second round ==
The draw of this second round conducted on Friday February 5, at 11:00 EET, at Delasport Bulgaria offices in Sofia.

Qualified teams divided to two groups. Each group consist of two teams from the Balkan region and one team from Israel played in a round-robin-system. No teams from the same country can be drawn in one group.

=== Draw ===
Pot	Team	City	Venue	Capacity
(Israel) Pot 1	Hapoel Gilboa Galil	Gan Ner	Gan Ner Sports Hall	2,700
(Israel) Pot 1	Hapoel Holon	Holon	Holon Toto Hall	5,000
(Bulgaria) Pot 2	Academic Plovdiv	Plovdiv	Arena Sila	1,000
(Bulgaria) Pot 2	Beroe	Stara Zagora	Municipal Hall	800
(North Macedonia) Pot 3	KK Kumanovo	Kumanovo	Sports Hall Kumanovo	6,500
(North Macedonia) Pot 3	TFT Skopje	Skopje	SRC Kale	4,000

=== Group F ===
Pos	Team	Pld	W	L	PF	PA	PD	Pts	Qualification	HGG	BER	TFT
1	(Israel) Hapoel Gilboa Galil	4	3	1	369	282	+87	7	Advance to Final Four	—	88–53	94–68
2	(Bulgaria) Beroe	4	3	1	321	343	−22	7	Advance to Final Four	90–82	—	91–90
3	(North Macedonia) TFT Skopje	4	0	4	312	377	−65	4		71–105	83–87	—

Source: 2020–21 BIBL Group F results

=== Group G ===
Pos	Team	Pld	W	L	PF	PA	PD	Pts	Qualification	HOL	APL	KUM
1	(Israel) Hapoel Holon	4	4	0	373	333	+40	8	Advance to Final Four	—	95–93	98–96
2	(Bulgaria) Academic Plovdiv	4	2	2	346	330	+16	6	Advance to Final Four	70–97	—	96–68
3	(North Macedonia) Kumanovo 2009	4	0	4	308	364	−56	4		74–83	70–87	—

Source: 2020–21 BIBL Group G results

== Final Four ==
By League's official regulations, section 3, if two teams from the same country qualify to the Final Four they shall play each other in the Semifinals game. The Final Four will take place at Holon Toto Hall.

Semifinals
27 Apr
(Israel) Hapoel Holon	81
(Israel) Hapoel Gilboa Galil	77
27 Apr
(Bulgaria) Beroe	62
(Bulgaria) Academic Plovdiv	66

Final
29 Apr
(Israel) Hapoel Holon	91
(Bulgaria) Academic Plovdiv	75
Third place
29 Apr
(Israel) Hapoel Gilboa Galil	84
(Bulgaria) Beroe	67

=== Semifinals ===
27 April 2021	Beroe (Bulgaria)	62–66	(Bulgaria) Academic Plovdiv	Holon
17:30	Scoring by quarter: 20-15, 13-23, 13-9, 16-19
	Pts: Gavin 19; Rebs: Bishop 12; Asts: Gavin 6 PIR: Gavin 28	Boxscore	Pts: Tomić 16; Rebs: Tomić 15; Asts: Bachev 5 PIR: Tomić 29	Arena: Holon Toto Hall; Referees: Milosav Kaludjerovic (MNE), Aleksandar Pavlov (MKD), Ofer Manheim (ISR)

27 April 2021	Hapoel Holon (Israel)	81–77	(Israel) Hapoel Gilboa Galil	Holon
20:00	Scoring by quarter: 27-18, 25-25, 8-21, 21-13
	Pts: Miles 18; Rebs: Miles 9 Asts: Harris5; PIR: Miles 25	Boxscore	Pts: Ziv 22; Rebs: Floyd 10; Asts: Thomasson 6 PIR: Ziv 29	Arena: Holon Toto Hall; Referees: Aleksandar Milojevik (MKD), Ognjen Jokic (MNE), Stylianos Symeonidis (GRE)

=== Third place ===
29 April 2021	Hapoel Gilboa Galil (Israel)	84–67	(Bulgaria) Beroe	Holon
17:30	Scoring by quarter: 14-18, 32-16, 22-14, 16-19
	Pts: Blackshear 14; Rebs: Blackshear 7 Asts: Beni 6 PIR: Blackshear 24	Boxscore	Pts: Bishop & Gavin 15; Rebs: Bishop 13; Asts: Georgiev 4 PIR: Bishop 19	Arena: Holon Toto Hall; Referees: Milosav Kaludjerovic (MNE), Stylianos Symeonidis (GRE), Aleksandar Pavlov (MKD)

=== Final ===
29 April 2021	Hapoel Holon (Israel)	91–75	(Bulgaria) Academic Plovdiv	Holon
20:00	Scoring by quarter: 23-26, 17-20, 24-20, 27-9
	Pts: McGee 20; Rebs: Miles 8 Asts: Pnini 6 PIR: Pnini 26	Boxscore	Pts: Tomić 18; Rebs: Gugino 7 Asts: Carson 11; PIR: Vucica 19	Arena: Holon Toto Hall; Referees: Aleksandar Milojevik (MKD), Ognjen Jokic (MNE), Ofer Manheim (ISR)

2020–21 Balkan League Champions
(Israel) Hapoel Holon
1st title
