= Jan Martín =

Spanish-Israeli basketball player

Jan Martín ג'אן מרטין
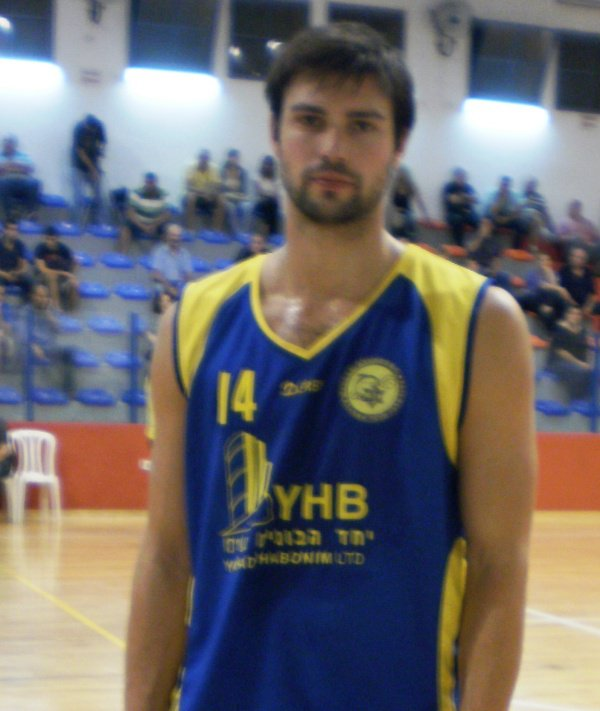
- Martín with Maccabi Ashdod in 2010

Personal information
- Born: November 20, 1984 (age 41) Hannover, West Germany
- Listed height: 6 ft 8 in (2.03 m)

Career information
- Playing career: 2000–2014
- Position: Center / forward

Career history
- 2000–2002: Real Canoe NC
- 2002–2004: Estudiantes
- 2004–2005: Fuenlabrada
- 2005–2006: Castelló
- 2006–2008: Real Madrid
- 2008–2009: Illescas
- 2009–2010: Elitzur Yavne
- 2010–2011: Maccabi Ashdod
- 2011–2012: Hapoel Gilboa Galil Elyon
- 2013–2014: CD Estudio

Career highlights
- Israeli League Rising Star (2011)

Jan Fernando Martín Sonneborn (Hebrew: ג'אן מרטין; born November 20, 1984) is a former professional basketball player with three nationalities, Spanish, German, and Israeli. In his career, he has played at three different positions, center, power forward and small forward.

Martín was the first Spanish player to play in the Israeli Super League. While playing with Maccabi Ashdod in the 2010–11 season, he was chosen as the Israeli League Rising Star.

== Playing career ==
=== Spain ===
Formed in the lower categories Maccabi Haifa BC and Real Canoe NC (basketball), Martín played EBA league with Real Canoe NC (basketball) in the seasons 2000–01 and 2001–02.

In the seasons 2002–03 and 2003–04, Martín played in CB Estudiantes of the EBA team, which he would combine with four appearances in the ACB team.

In season 2004–05, Martín was part of the LEB roster of Baloncesto Fuenlabrada with whom he won the ascent to the ACB.

In the 2005–06 season, Martín played for AB Castelló in LEB 2 with 12.4 points, 6.2 rebounds and 1.1 assists.

In 2006–07, Martín played in Real Madrid Baloncesto in the LEB Plata, he was the player with most minutes played (29.5), leading scorer (12.3) and the second most valued. He played three games in ULEB Cup, the first of these matches was against PAOK Salonika. He debuted wearing the shirt of Real Madrid Baloncesto in ACB on February 4, 2007, against CB Granada. In 2007-08 he continued in the Real Madrid Baloncesto in the LEB Bronze, was the true leader of his team, he was the player with most minutes played (31.2), leading scorer (15.7), maximum rebounder (6.9) and most valuable player (14.8). In this season he led his team to the playoffs with 15.5 points, 6.7 rebounds, 1.6 assists and 0.9 blocks.

In season 2008–09, Martín arrived at CB Illescas LEB Oro with good percentages 6.5 points (50% T2, T3 37% and 88% TL) and 3.4 rebounds in 18.1 minutes.

=== In Israel ===
In 2009, Martín realized a test for Maccabi Tel Aviv B.C., the team left satisfied and decided to include it to be divested to Elitzur Yavne B.C. in the National League. In this team he held position of small forward, convincing with his game averaging 15.8 points, 5.1 rebounds and 1.5 assists.

As a reward in 2010–11, Martín played the first category in the Maccabi Ashdod B.C., which coincided with Meir Tapiro, international for several years with Israel, and Niv Berkowitz, son of the legendary Miki Berkovich.

In the 2011–12 season, Martín signed for Hapoel Gilboa Galil Elyon, the first Israeli team division, getting to be champion of the International League Balkan .

In 2012, Martín signed with Hapoel Eilat B.C. and ends his stage in Israel.

=== Return to Spain ===
In 2013, Martín reinforced workouts of the Bilbao Basket during the pre-season in the ACB, to cover the floor of Germán Gabriel who was in the Eurobasket with the Spanish National team. In their last game was one of the most accurate, scoring 10 points against Cajasol of Aito Garcia Reneses.

In September 2013, Martín reaches an agreement with Club Deportivo Estudio to play in Group B of the EBA league. On the game 10 got to be the most valuable player of Group B with 17 points, 16 rebounds, 5 assists, 4 steals and 2 blocks for 34 valuation.

=== Spanish national team ===
International with the Spanish national team junior and U-20, playing with Rudy Fernandez and Marc Gasol. Martín debuted with the junior team in the International Tournament of Corfu in 2001 scoring 7 points and capturing 4 rebounds, soon he became a reference in the National Team.

Runner-up in the Albert Schweitzer Tournament 2002, Martín was an absolute reference within the team as demonstrated in the first game scoring 29 points against Yugoslavia.

== Personal life ==
Martín is a non-religious Jew. He is the son of Fernando Martín, the first Spaniard who has played in the NBA, and Sarah Sonneborn, a Jewish German historian and former model who made aliyah in 1989 and became a citizen of Israel. As a child, he lived in the religious kibbutz Sde Eliyahu in the Beit She'an Valley. He is also the nephew of basketball player Antonio Martín.

== Awards and accomplishments ==
=== Spanish Selection ===
Silver medal in the Albert Schweitzer Tournament in 2002.

=== CB Estudiantes ===
- Runner-up Liga ACB in 2003–04.

=== Baloncesto Fuenlabrada ===
- Champion Copa Príncipe de Asturias in 2004–05.
- Champion Liga LEB in 2004–05.

=== Galil Gilboa ===
- Champion International League Balkan in 2011–12.

=== Individual ===
- International Tournament MVP Alcobendas in 2002.
- Israeli League Rising Star in 2011.
