= Isaiah Miles =

American basketball player (born 1994)

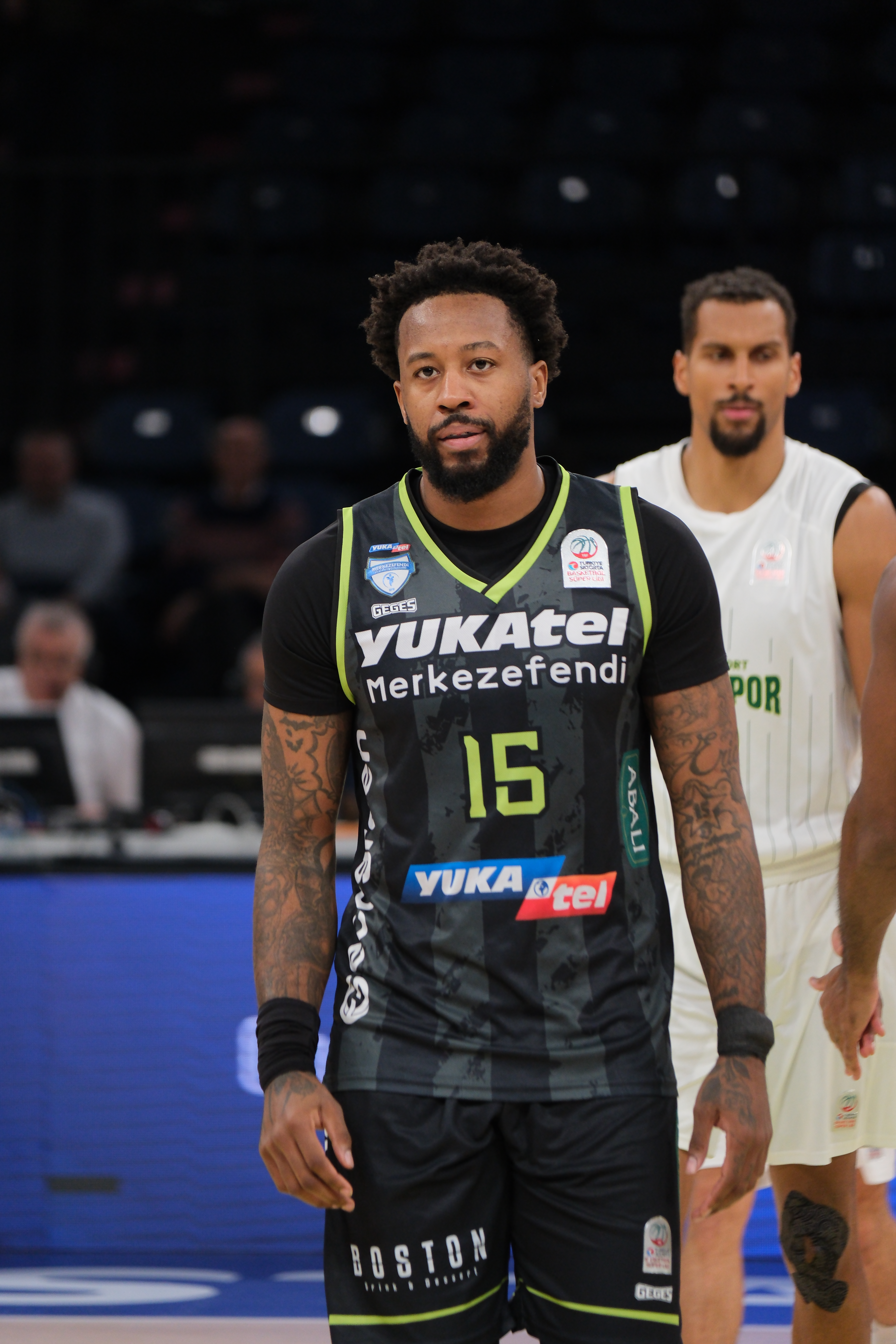
- Miles with Merkezefendi Belediyesi in 2026

No. 32 – Denizli Basket
- Position: Power forward
- League: BSL

Personal information
- Born: June 9, 1994 (age 32) Baltimore, Maryland
- Listed height: 6 ft 8 in (2.03 m)
- Listed weight: 220 lb (100 kg)

Career information
- High school: Glenelg Country School (Ellicott City, Maryland); Milford Mill Academy (Baltimore, Maryland)
- College: St. Joseph's (2012–2016)
- NBA draft: 2016: undrafted
- Playing career: 2016–present

Career history
- 2016–2017: JDA Dijon
- 2017–2018: Uşak Sportif
- 2018–2019: Limoges CSP
- 2019–2020: Delaware Blue Coats
- 2020–2021: Hapoel Holon
- 2021–2022: Promitheas Patras
- 2022–2023: AEK Athens
- 2023–2024: Maccabi Ramat Gan
- 2024: Hapoel Tel Aviv
- 2024–2025: Maccabi Ramat Gan
- 2025: Cholet Basket
- 2025–2026: Merkezefendi Belediyesi
- 2026: Pallacanestro Cantù
- 2026–present: Denizli Basket

Career highlights
- Balkan League Final Four MVP (2021); Second–team All-Atlantic 10 (2016); Atlantic 10 Most Improved Player (2016)
- Stats at Basketball Reference

Isaiah Miles (born June 9, 1994) is an American professional basketball player for Denizli Basket of the Turkish Basketbol Süper Ligi (BSL). He played college basketball for the Saint Joseph's Hawks.

== Early life and high school ==
Miles was born in Baltimore, Maryland and grew up in the suburb of Owings Mills. He attended Glenelg Country School for three years before transferring to Milford Mill Academy before his senior year. He was a standout basketball player at both schools and was an All-Metro selection by The Baltimore Sun in his junior and senior seasons.

== College career ==
Miles played four seasons for the St. Joseph's Hawks, starting out as a reserve player and gradually gaining more playing time until he was a starter his final two seasons. In his first season as a starter, he averaged 10.7 points and 5.1 rebounds.

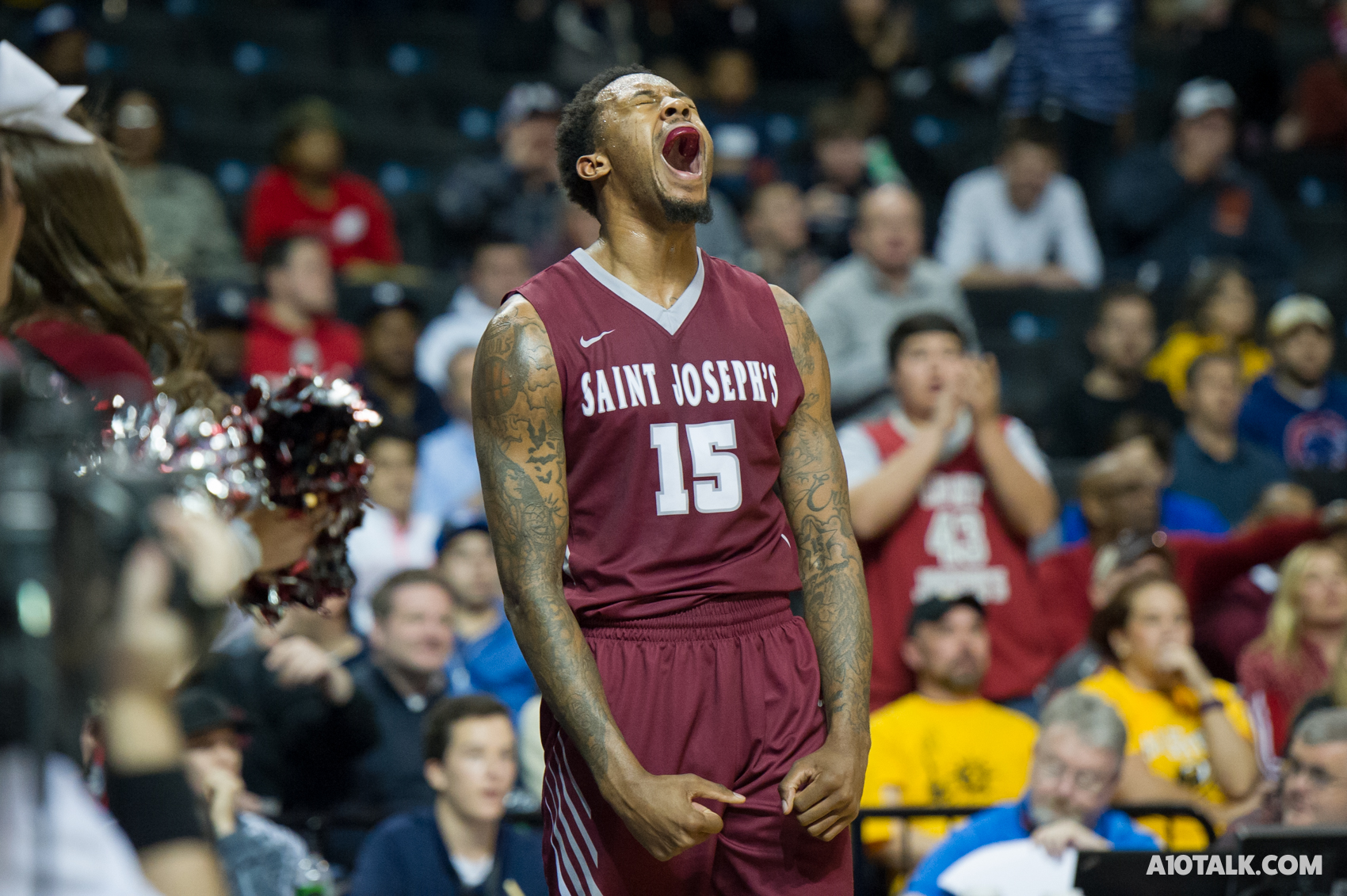
Miles in 2016

In his senior season, Miles averaged 18.1 points and 8.1 rebounds per game as the Hawks won the Atlantic 10 Conference title. In the first round of the 2016 NCAA tournament, Miles hit a three-pointer with nine seconds left to put the Hawks ahead against Cincinnati. Miles was named second team all conference and Most Improved Player by both the Atlantic 10 and the Big 5 at the end of the season. He credited his improvement to losing over 20 pounds during the offseason by eliminating fast food, specifically the Wendy's Baconator, from his diet. Over the course of his college career, Miles averaged 10.3 points and 4.7 rebounds per game in 107 games played (68 starts). He graduated from Saint Joseph's University with a degree in business.

== Professional career ==
=== JDA Dijon ===
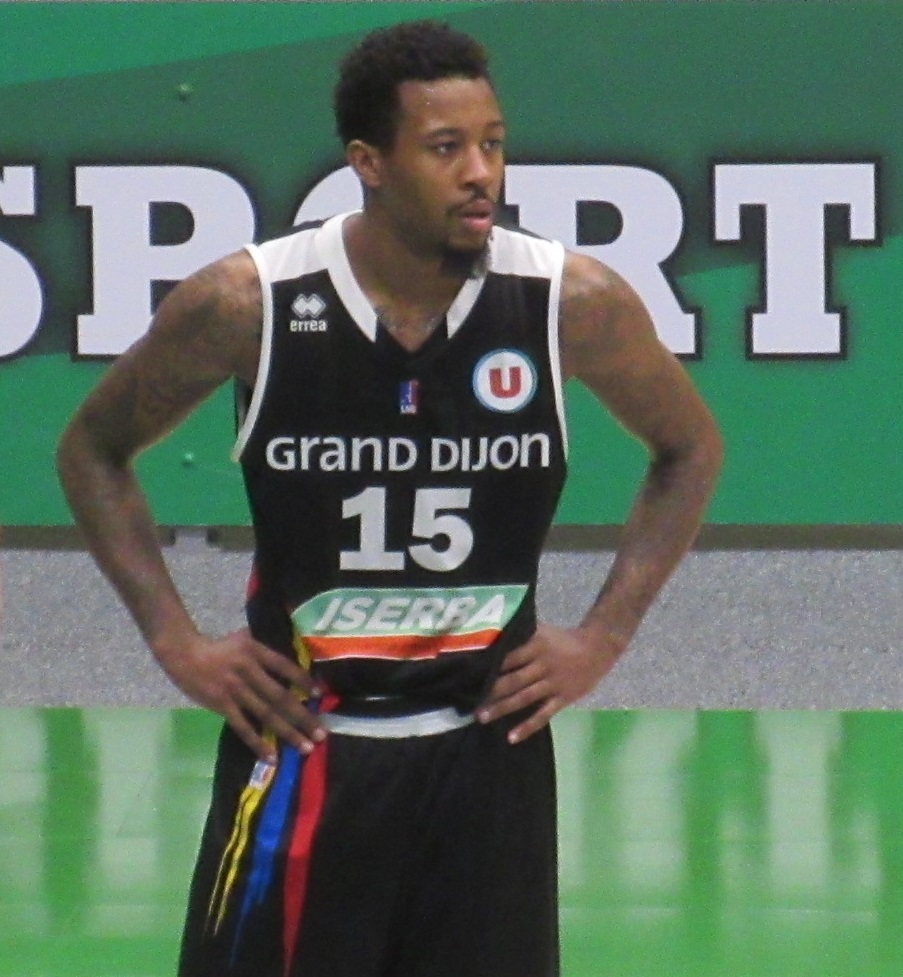
Miles with JDA Dijon.

Miles earned an invitation to the NBA Draft Combine but was not selected in the 2016 NBA draft. After a stint with the Dallas Mavericks NBA Summer League team, Miles signed with JDA Dijon of the French LNB Pro A on July 24, 2016. In 34 games with the team, he averaged 12.2 points and 4.9 rebounds per game. After his performance with Dijon, Miles was offered a spot on the Philadelphia 76ers Summer League roster.

=== Uşak Sportif ===
Miles signed with Uşak Sportif of the Turkish Super League on June 17, 2017. In 16 league games he averaged 10.7 points, 3.6 rebounds and 1.1 assists per game and was again a member of the 76ers Summer League team. Miles was the 76ers second-leading scorer at 10.4 points per game and shot 47.6 percent on 3-point attempts in five games (two starts) of Summer League competition.

=== Limoges ===
Miles returned to France after signing with Limoges CSP on July 21, 2018. He was named the Most Valuable Player for the 4th round of the 2018–19 EuroCup after scoring 23 points and grabbing seven rebounds against Tofaş S.K. Miles averaged 9.2 points, 3.8 rebounds, and 1.1 assists in 34 LNB Pro A games as Limoges finished 7th in the league and lost to Monaco in the first round of the playoffs. Miles also averaged 10.3 points and 3.3 rebounds per game in 14 EuroCup games.

Following the end of the season, Miles was named to the Orlando Magic's Summer League roster and averaged 6.3 points and 2.3 rebounds in four games. Miles participated in The Basketball Tournament for Team Hines after the conclusion of Summer League.

=== Delaware Blue Coats ===
On August 8, 2019, Miles signed an Exhibit 10 contract with the Philadelphia 76ers. He was waived by the 76ers on October 19, 2019, and was added to the roster of the team's NBA G League affiliate, the Delaware Blue Coats. Miles was waived by the Blue Coats on January 21, 2020. He appeared in 11 games, averaging 6.1 points and 2.2 rebounds per game.

=== Cholet Basket ===
On February 26, 2020, he has signed with Cholet of the LNB Pro A. He had to leave the team without ever wearing the Cholet jersey due to the arrival of COVID-19.

=== Hapoel Holon ===
On August 15, 2020, Miles signed with Hapoel Holon of the Israeli Basketball Premier League.

=== Promitheas Patras ===
On August 20, 2021, Miles signed with Greek club Promitheas Patras which competes in the EuroCup.

=== AEK Athens ===
On November 18, 2022, Miles signed with Greek club AEK Athens which competes in the Basketball Champions League. In 12 domestic league games, he averaged 9.7 points, 5.2 rebounds and 1.2 assists, playing around 26 minutes per contest.

=== Hapoel Tel Aviv ===
On April 28, 2024, he signed with Hapoel Tel Aviv of the Israeli Basketball Premier League.

=== Return to Cholet Basket ===
On October 10, 2025, he signed with Cholet Basket of LNB Pro A.

=== Merkezefendi Denizli Basket ===
On December 11, 2025, he signed with Merkezefendi Denizli Basket.

=== Pallacanestro Cantù ===
On August 16, 2026, he signed with Pallacanestro Cantù of the Lega Basket Serie A (LBA).

=== Return to Denizli Basket ===
On November 14, 2026, he signed with Yukatel Denizli Basket of the Basketbol Süper Ligi for a second stint.

== Personal life ==
Miles is an avid fan of Superhero comics, a hobby that he picked up from his father, and has numerous comic book characters tattooed on the full length of his right arm.
