= Mirko Proroković =

Montenegrin basketball player and coach

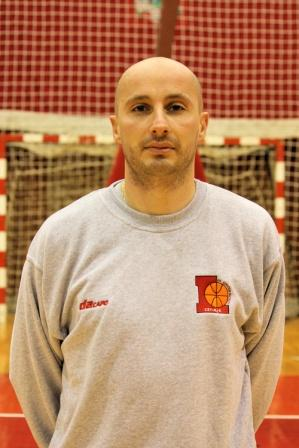

Teodo Tivat
- Position: Head coach

Personal information
- Born: July 27, 1978 (age 48) Cetinje, Montenegro, SFR Yugoslavia

Career information
- Playing career: 1988–1998

Career history

Playing
- 1988–1998: Lovćen

Coaching
- 2003–2016: Lovćen
- 2011–present: Montenegro U18
- 2017–2019: Lovćen 1947 (assistant)
- 2019–present: Teodo Tivat

Mirko Proroković (born July 27, 1978) is a Montenegrin professional basketball coach and former player. He is a head coach for Teodo Tivat.
