= 2013–14 BIBL season =

2013–14 BIBL
- Season: 2013–14
- Teams: 9

Finals
- Champions: (Bulgaria) Levski Sofia
- Runners-up: (Israel) Hapoel Gilboa Galil

In the sixth season of the Balkan International Basketball League, ten participants from Bulgaria, the Republic of Macedonia, Montenegro, Israel and Romania and the new represented country Kosovo has competed.

== Teams ==
Country	Teams	Teams	
Bulgaria	2	Balkan Botevgrad	Levski Sofia
Kosovo	2	Peja	Sigal Prishtina
(North Macedonia) Macedonia	2	Kumanovo	Kozuv
Montenegro	1	Teodo	
Israel	1	Hapoel Gilboa Galil	
Romania	1	U Craiova	

== Format ==
=== First round ===
In the first round the nine teams play with the other teams, home and away games, eighteen rounds, sixteen games per each team. The top two teams advanced to Final Four. The teams that finished between third and sixth place advanced to the second round.

The opening game has been played on 15 October 2013 and the last match day was played on 26 March 2014.

=== Second round ===
The four teams, that finished between third and sixth place in the first round, would play two-leg ties, which would determine the other two participants in the final Four.

The first game was played on 1 April 2014 and the last match day was played on 9 April 2014.

=== Final four ===
The four remaining teams played a semifinal match and the winners of those advanced to the final. The losers played in a third-place playoff. The dates of the final Four were 2 and 4 May 2014.

== First round ==
Key to colors
Advances to Final Four
Advances to Second Round

	Team	Pld	W	L	PF	PA	Diff	Pts
1.	(Israel) Hapoel Gilboa Galil	16	12	4	1283	1164	+119	28
2.	(Kosovo) Sigal Prishtina	16	11	5	1248	1193	+55	27
3.	(Bulgaria) Levski Sofia	16	10	6	1300	1279	+21	26
4.	(Bulgaria) Balkan Botevgrad	16	9	7	1314	1268	+46	25
5.	(Montenegro) Teodo	16	7	9	1246	1275	−29	23
6.	(North Macedonia) Kumanovo	16	6	10	1276	1342	−66	22
7.	(Kosovo) Peja	16	6	10	1132	1160	−28	22
8.	(Romania) U Craiova	16	6	10	1212	1279	−67	22
9.	(North Macedonia) Kozuv	16	5	11	1196	1247	−51	21

	BB	HGG	KOZ	KUM	LEV	PEJ	STG	TEO	UCR
(Bulgaria) Balkan Botevgrad		71–77	84–77	96-69	68–64	96–76	85–77	82–67	89–62
(Israel) Hapoel Gilboa Galil	97–83		100–75	94–72	73–82	2–0	71–66	95–81	85–78
(North Macedonia) Kozuv	79–88	65–72		104–86	68–73	84–79	83–85	74–75	84–78
(North Macedonia) Kumanovo	87–73	99–92	74–58		85–92	93–85	78–89	92–108	73–60
(Bulgaria) Levski Sofia	98–94	100–95	71–84	88–82		69–81	91–87	91–85	84–73
(Kosovo) Peja	79-67	66–76	68–62	81-75	78–86		65–80	70–66	80–65
(Kosovo) Sigal Prishtina	89–71	81–78	68–58	75–60	77–68	72–70		74–71	72–83
(Montenegro) Teodo	76–71	75–96	74–80	67–72	76-72	82–79	76-70		91–70
(Romania) U Craiova	91–96	70–80	72-61	80-76	73–71	85–75	85–86	87–76	

Notes

1. The game between Hapoel Gilboa Galil and KB Peja was cancelled after the away team from Kosovo failed to obtain travel visas due to on-going strike of the Israeli Ministry of Foreign Affairs. Due to the lack of alternative dates in the calendar, the game would not be rescheduled, so the League decided to award a win to Hapoel and a loss to Peja.

== Second round ==
The second round are two-legged ties determined on aggregate score. The first legs will be played on April 1-2 and return legs will be played on April 8-9.

Team #1	Agg.	Team #2	1st leg	2nd leg
Kumanovo (North Macedonia)	160–169	(Bulgaria) Levski Sofia	74−74	86−95
Teodo (Montenegro)	129–141	(Bulgaria) Balkan Botevgrad	71−75	58−66

== Final four ==
Semifinals; April 25
Pallati i Rinisë dhe Sporteve − Pristina
(Bulgaria) Levski Sofia	94
(Bulgaria) Balkan Botevgrad	85
Pallati i Rinisë dhe Sporteve − Pristina
(Israel) Hapoel Gilboa Galil	86
(Kosovo) Sigal Prishtina	74

Final; April 27
Pallati i Rinisë dhe Sporteve − Pristina
(Bulgaria) Levski Sofia	75
(Israel) Hapoel Gilboa Galil	69
Third place April 27
Pallati i Rinisë dhe Sporteve − Pristina
(Bulgaria) Balkan Botevgrad	79
(Kosovo) Sigal Prishtina	73

=== Semifinals ===
25 April 2014
17:30

Report

Levski Sofia (Bulgaria)	94–85 (OT)	(Bulgaria) Balkan Botevgrad
Scoring by quarter: 18−23, 16−22, 19−23, 25−10, Overtime: 16−7
Pts: Heath 23; Rebs: Wilkinson, Jones 9 Asts: Heath 8		Pts: Lilov 21; Rebs: Dahlman 8 Asts: Lilov 7

Pallati i Rinisë dhe Sporteve, Pristina
Referees: Igor Dragojević, Ognjen Jokić, Georgios Tanatzis

25 April 2014
20:15

Report

Hapoel Gilboa Galil (Israel)	86–74	(Kosovo) Sigal Prishtina
Scoring by quarter: 19−21, 18−20, 22−23, 27−10
Pts: Boynton 20; Rebs: Simhon 7 Asts: Robinson 6		Pts: Berisha, Mazreku 16; Rebs: Mazreku 11; Asts: Berisha 9

Pallati i Rinisë dhe Sporteve, Pristina
Referees: Radomir Vojinović, Ioannis Foufis, Ventsislav Velikov

=== Third place ===
27 April 2014
14:00

Report

Sigal Prishtina (Kosovo)	73–79	(Bulgaria) Balkan Botevgrad
Scoring by quarter: 17−21, 17−12, 15−15, 24−31
Pts: Mazreku 25; Rebs: Šeļakovs 7 Asts: Berisha 6		Pts: P. Marinov 18; Rebs: Dahlman 11; Asts: M. Marinov 4

Pallati i Rinisë dhe Sporteve, Pristina
Referees: Igor Dragojević, Ognjen Jokić, Aleksandar Milojevik

=== Final ===
27 April 2014
16:30

Report

Hapoel Gilboa Galil (Israel)	69–75	(Bulgaria) Levski Sofia
Scoring by quarter: 19−19, 13−21, 22−16, 15−19
Pts: Jackson 17; Rebs: Jackson 8 Asts: Boynton, Simhon 4		Pts: Chalmers 17; Rebs: Chalmers 11; Asts: Jones 5

Pallati i Rinisë dhe Sporteve, Pristina
Referees: Radomir Vojinović, Ioannis Foufis, Georgios Tanatzis

2013–14 Balkan League Champions

Levski Sofia
2nd Title
