= Nikola Vučurović =

Montenegrin basketball player

Personal information
- Born: May 17, 1980 (age 46) Nikšić, SR Montenegro, SFR Yugoslavia
- Listed height: 2.01 m (6 ft 7 in)

Career information
- Playing career: 1997–2018
- Position: Small forward

Career history
- 1998–1999: Vojvodina
- 1999–2000: Ibon Nikšić
- 2000–2004: Lovćen
- 2004: Ergonom Niš
- 2004–2005: Clermont
- 2005–2006: Köln 99ers
- 2006–2007: Crvena zvezda
- 2007–2008: Igokea
- 2008–2010: Bosna
- 2010: Brest
- 2010–2011: Mogren
- 2012: MZT Skopje Aerodrom
- 2012–2013: Feni Industries
- 2013–2014: Teodo Tivat
- 2014–2015: SCM CSU Craiova
- 2015: Sigal Prishtina
- 2015–2018: Teodo Tivat

Career highlights
- Macedonian League champion (2012); Macedonian Cup winner (2012)

Nikola Vučurović (born May 17, 1980) is a Montenegrin professional basketball player for Teodo Tivat of the Montenegrin League.
