= 2021–22 BIBL season =

2021–22 BIBL
- League: Balkan International Basketball League
- Season: 2021–22
- Dates: 12 October 2021 – 1 May 2022
- Games played: 80
- Teams: 13
- TV partner(s): sportmedia.tv YouTube; RTSH

Finals
- Champions: (Israel) Hapoel Galil Elyon
- Runners-up: (Israel) Maccabi Haifa
- Semifinalists: (Israel) Ironi Nahariya (Bulgaria) Balkan Botevgrad

Seasons
- ← 2020–21 2022–23 →
- All statistics correct as of 6 March 2025.

The 2021–22 BIBL season is the 14th edition of Balkan International Basketball League (BIBL). 10-13 teams from Bulgaria, Israel, Kosovo, Montenegro and North Macedonia will participate in the competition.

== Teams ==
First round
(Bulgaria) Academic Plovdiv	(Israel) Hapoel Galil Elyon	(Kosovo) Prishtina	(North Macedonia) TFT Skopje
(Bulgaria) Balkan Botevgrad	(Israel) Ironi Nahariya	(Montenegro) Ibar Rožaje	
(Bulgaria) Beroe	(Israel) Maccabi Haifa	(North Macedonia) ~~Kumanovo 2009~~	
(Bulgaria) Levski Sofia	(Kosovo) ~~Peja~~	(North Macedonia) Navico Akademija FMP	
Second round
(Israel) ~~Hapoel Holon~~

== First round ==
Ten teams drawn into two groups consisting of five teams each. Teams from the same country will be drawn in different groups. Peja will be drawn into a group with two teams from North Macedonia due to traveling schedule. Teams play against each other home-and-away basis. The teams placed 1st, 2nd, 3rd and 4th from each group will advanced to the second round.

During September, the league management announced the addition of two teams to the first round. On October 6, the league management decided to take Peja out of the tournament since Peja refused to confirm the competition's official schedule as well as fulfill all their financial obligations towards the league in the deadlines set. On October 13, the league management announced that Maccabi Haifa will take Peja's place as the 2nd participant in the league.

On 26 November, The Balkan International Basketball League management decided to take Kumanovo 2009 out of the competition due to its inability to fulfill its obligations. All its results were annulled, and its remaining games cancelled.

=== Draw ===
The draw took place on 26 August. The Ten teams was divided into 5 Seeds and drawn into two groups of five.

Seed 1 Team (Israel) Ironi Nahariya (Israel) Hapoel Galil Elyon	Seed 2 Team (Bulgaria) Academic Plovdiv (Bulgaria) Balkan Botevgrad	Seed 3 Team (North Macedonia) Kumanovo 2009 (North Macedonia) TFT Skopje	Seed 4 Team (Bulgaria) Beroe (North Macedonia) Navico Akademija FMP	Seed 5 Team (Kosovo) Prishtina (Kosovo) Peja

=== Group A ===
Pos	Team	Pld	W	L	PF	PA	PD	Pts	Qualification	HGE	MHA	BAL	LEV	AFM	KUM
1	(Israel) Hapoel Galil Elyon	8	7	1	604	461	+143	15	Advance to Second round	—	88–41	56–46	20–0 (Note: The match was not played due to Corona's cases in Levski Sofia. The league management decided to grant Hapoel Galil Elyon a technical victory after consulting with FIBA and after no further date was found for the match.)	107–65	—
2	(Israel) Maccabi Haifa	8	5	3	599	561	+38	13	Advance to Second round	80–85	—	92–78	20–0 (Note: The match was not played due to Corona's cases in Levski Sofia. The league management decided to grant Maccabi Haifa a technical victory after consulting with FIBA and after no further date was found for the match.)	95–73	—
3	(Bulgaria) Balkan Botevgrad	8	4	4	591	583	+8	12	Advance to Second round	64–70	88–81	—	82–73	80–71	—
4	(Bulgaria) Levski Sofia	8	2	6	464	513	−49	10	Advance to Second round	84–76	60–78	65–79	—	81–84	—
5	(North Macedonia) Navico Akademija FMP	8	2	6	615	755	−140	10		82–102	89–112	77–75	74–103	—	—
6	(North Macedonia) Kumanovo 2009 (Note: The Balkan International Basketball League management decided to take Kumanovo 2009 out of the competition due to its inability to fulfill its obligations. All its results were annulled, and its remaining games canceled.)	0	0	0	0	0	0	0	Expelled	87–96	—	—	—	59–63	—

Source: Group A standing

=== Group B ===
Pos	Team	Pld	W	L	PF	PA	PD	Pts	Qualification	NAH	PRI	APL	TFT	BER	IBR
1	(Israel) Ironi Nahariya	10	8	2	801	684	+117	18	Advance to Second round	—	83–74	98–73	102–63	63–69	69–57
2	(Kosovo) Prishtina	10	6	4	848	794	+54	16	Advance to Second round	84–61	—	85–94	80–73	83–61	110–85
3	(Bulgaria) Academic Plovdiv	10	5	5	786	793	−7	15	Advance to Second round	61–76	74–78	—	81–84	74–68	77–61
4	(North Macedonia) TFT Skopje	10	5	5	799	826	−27	15	Advance to Second round	66–67	81–77	75–83	—	95–88	87–83
5	(Bulgaria) Beroe	10	3	7	791	856	−65	13		67–103	93–94	98–91	86–96	—	67–79
6	(Montenegro) Ibar Rožaje	10	3	7	749	821	−72	13		70–79	87–83	68–78	79–77	78–94	—

Source: Group B standing

== Second round ==
The results between the teams from the same groups in the first round shall be carried forward into this round. The eight teams will be divided into new two groups of four teams each. Teams play against each other on a home-and-away basis. The teams placed 1st from each group will advance to the Final Four. The teams placed 2nd and 3rd from each group will advance to the Quarter-Finals.

=== Group C ===
Pos	Team	Pld	W	L	PF	PA	PD	Pts	Qualification	HGE	LEV	PRI	APL
1	(Israel) Hapoel Galil Elyon	6	4	2	439	380	+59	10	Advance to Final Four	—	20–0 (Note: The match was not played due to Corona's cases in Levski Sofia. The league management decided to grant Hapoel Galil Elyon a technical victory after consulting with FIBA and after no further date was found for the match.)	95–84	96–83
2	(Bulgaria) Levski Sofia	6	4	2	405	366	+39	10	Advance to quarter-finals	84–76	—	77–69	92–58
3	(Kosovo) Prishtina	6	3	3	456	471	−15	9	Advance to quarter-finals	74–68	66–63	—	85–94
4	(Bulgaria) Academic Plovdiv	6	1	5	441	524	−83	7		55–84	77–89	74–78	—

Source: Group C standing

=== Group D ===
Pos	Team	Pld	W	L	PF	PA	PD	Pts	Qualification	NAH	BAL	MHA	TFT
1	(Israel) Ironi Nahariya	6	5	1	510	429	+81	11	Advance to Final Four	—	76–64	105–73	102–63
2	(Bulgaria) Balkan Botevgrad	6	4	2	518	457	+61	10	Advance to quarter-finals	87–73	—	88–81	104–53
3	(Israel) Maccabi Haifa	6	3	3	506	516	−10	9	Advance to quarter-finals	76–87	92–78	—	91–85
4	(North Macedonia) TFT Skopje	6	0	6	422	552	−130	6		66–67	82–97	73–93	—

Source: Group D standing

== Knockout rounds ==
=== Quarterfinals ===
Team #1	Agg.	Team #2	1st leg	2nd leg
Balkan Botevgrad (Bulgaria)	165–148	(Kosovo) Prishtina	83–85	82–63
Levski Sofia (Bulgaria)	169–188	(Israel) Maccabi Haifa	83–91	86–97

==== Game 1 ====
14 April 2022	Prishtina (Kosovo)	85–83	(Bulgaria) Balkan Botevgrad	Palace of Youth and Sports, Pristina
	Scoring by quarter: 35–25, 16–19, 18–22, 16–17
	Pts: Mitchell 19; Rebs: Cook 7 Asts: Dugat 6 PIR: Cook 19	Boxscore	Pts: Rorie 19; Rebs: Jones 10; Asts: Rorie 5 PIR: Rorie 25	Attendance: 1,000; Referees: Aleksandar Pavlov, Ognjen Jokic, Alija Ferevski

19 April 2022	Maccabi Haifa (Israel)	91–83	(Bulgaria) Levski Sofia	Universiada Hall, Sofia
19.00	Scoring by quarter: 19–20, 27–28, 22–23, 23–12
	Pts: Vaughn 23; Rebs: Freund 11; Asts: Kozahinof 13; PIR: Vaughn 21	Boxscore	Pts: Knowles 24; Rebs: Knowles 13; Asts: Parker 15; PIR: Knowles 34	Attendance: 250; Referees: Ognjen Jokic, Daut Mehmeti, Sava Cetkovic

==== Game 2 ====
20 April 2022	Balkan Botevgrad (Bulgaria)	82–63	(Kosovo) Prishtina	Arena Botevgrad, Botevgrad
19.00	Scoring by quarter: 16–18, 18–15, 25–13, 23–16
	Pts: Jones 27; Rebs: Jones 9 Asts: Rorie 11; PIR: Jones 30	Boxscore	Pts: Ismaili 16; Rebs: Thomas 9 Asts: Palokaj 5 PIR: Ismaili 16	Attendance: 600; Referees: Diamantis Lortos, Ioannis Bakalis, Ioannis Agrafiotis

21 April 2022	Levski Sofia (Bulgaria)	86–97	(Israel) Maccabi Haifa	Universiada Hall, Sofia
17.00	Scoring by quarter: 25–28, 20–26, 16–19, 25–24
	Pts: Knowles 18; Rebs: Knowles 11; Asts: Dimitrov 4 PIR: Knowles 27	Boxscore	Pts: Putney 26; Rebs: Putney 9 Asts: Vaughn 13; PIR: Putney 40	Attendance: 300; Referees: Ognjen Jokic, Daut Mehmeti, Stefan Kuburovic

=== Final Four ===
The Final Four games will be composed of two semi-final games, third-place game and final game. Due Three teams from Israel qualified to the Final Four a draw will be made to determine the two pairs of the Semi Final games.

Semi-finals
29 April 2022
(Israel) Hapoel Galil Elyon	80
(Israel) Ironi Nahariya	46
29 April 2022
(Israel) Maccabi Haifa	86
(Bulgaria) Balkan Botevgrad	81

Final
1 May 2022
(Israel) Hapoel Galil Elyon	86
(Israel) Maccabi Haifa	70
Third place
1 May 2022
(Bulgaria) Balkan Botevgrad	65
(Israel) Ironi Nahariya	86

==== Semifinals ====
29 April 2022	Hapoel Galil Elyon (Israel)	80–46	(Israel) Ironi Nahariya	Nahariya
14:00	Scoring by quarter: 20–8, 17–7, 14–10, 29–21
	Pts: Levi 11; Rebs: Levi 8 Asts: Stove 4 PIR: Washington 17	Boxscore	Pts: Branch 11; Rebs: Three players 5 Asts: Poleg 6 PIR: Branch 12	Arena: Ein Sara Sport Hall; Attendance: 1,000; Referees: Ognjen Jokic, Alija Ferevski, Ioannis Agrafiotis

29 April 2022	Maccabi Haifa (Israel)	86–81	(Bulgaria) Balkan Botevgrad	Nahariya
16:30	Scoring by quarter: 19–15, 24–22, 22–28, 21–16
	Pts: Vaughn 23; Rebs: Putney 13; Asts: Kozahinof 9 PIR: Putney 30	Boxscore	Pts: Marks 20; Rebs: Jones 9 Asts: Rorie 6 PIR: Rorie 20	Arena: Ein Sara Sport Hall; Attendance: 450; Referees: Aleksandar Pavlov, Daut Mehmeti, Diamantis Lortos

==== Third place ====
1 May 2022	Balkan Botevgrad (Bulgaria)	65–86	(Israel) Ironi Nahariya	Nahariya
18:00	Scoring by quarter: 17–26, 18–16, 16–20, 14–24
	Pts: Jones 14; Rebs: Jones 9 Asts: Rorie & Dimitrov 4 PIR: Jones 15	Boxscore	Pts: Branch 19; Rebs: Chubrevich 10; Asts: Uzan 7 PIR: Branch 29	Arena: Ein Sara Sport Hall; Attendance: 500; Referees: Alija Ferevski, Diamantis Lortos, Sava Cetkovic

==== Final ====
1 May 2022	Hapoel Galil Elyon (Israel)	86–70	(Israel) Maccabi Haifa	Nahariya
20:30	Scoring by quarter: 27–17, 21–15, 21–21, 17–17
	Pts: Kennedy 21; Rebs: Levi 9 Asts: Iroegbu & Lewis 6 PIR: Kennedy 26	Boxscore	Pts: Taylor Jr. 16; Rebs: Taylor Jr. 12; Asts: Vaughn 4 PIR: Mitchell 21	Arena: Ein Sara Sport Hall; Attendance: 700; Referees: Ognjen Jokic, Aleksandar Pavlov, Ioannis Agrafiotis

2021–22 Balkan League Champions
(Israel) Hapoel Galil Elyon
1st title

== Awards ==
=== MVP of the Month ===
Month	Player	Team	EFF	Ref.
2021
October	(Nigeria) Ike Iroegbu	Hapoel Galil Elyon	18.7	
November	(North Macedonia) Aleksandar Kostoski	TFT Skopje	14.3	
December	(United States) Stephaun Branch	Ironi Nahariya	19.6	
2022
January	(United States) Kwame Vaughn	Maccabi Haifa	22	
March	(United States) Christian Jones	BC Balkan	22.3	

=== First Round awards ===
Award	Player	Team		Ref.
Most Valuable Player	(United States) Dustin Thomas	Ironi Nahariya	21.4 EFF	
Top Scorer	(United States) Billy Rae Ivey	Navico Akademija FMP	23.4 pt	
Top Rebounder	(United States) Obinna Oleka	Beroe	9.7 rebounds	
Best Passer	(Bulgaria) Stanimir Marinov	Balkan Botevgrad	6.8 assists	

=== MVP of the Second Round ===
Player	Team	EFF	Ref.
(United States) Christian Jones	Balkan Botevgrad	22.0	

=== MVP of the Final Four ===
Player	Team	Ref.
(Israel) (Sweden) Nimrod Levi	Hapoel Galil Elyon	
