= 2008–09 BIBL season =

2008–09 BIBL
- Season: 2008–09
- Teams: 10

Finals
- Champions: (Bulgaria) Rilski Sportist
- Runners-up: (North Macedonia) Feršped Rabotnički

The 2008-09 season is the first season of the Balkan International Basketball League. Ten teams from the Republic of Macedonia, Bulgaria, Romania and Serbia are competing.

== Teams ==
Country	Teams	Teams		
(North Macedonia) Macedonia	2	Feršped Rabotnički	Feni Industries	
Romania	2	Cuadripol Brașov	Dinamo București	
Bulgaria	3	Euroins Cherno More	Rilski Sportist	Levski Sofia
Serbia	3	Mega Hypo Leasing	Radnički 034 Group	Swisslion Takovo

== Format ==
=== Regular season ===
In the regular season the teams will be divided into two groups, each containing five teams. Each team plays every other team in its group at home and away. The top 4 teams in each group advance to the playoffs. Games will be played from October 7, 2008 to February 18, 2009.

=== Quarterfinals ===
The top four teams in each group advance for the quarterfinals. The winner of Group A/Group B will play with the fourth placed team in Group B/Group A and the second placed team in Group A/Group B will play with the third in Group B/Group A.

=== Final four ===
The four remaining teams play a semifinal match and the winners of those advance to the final. The losers play in a third-place playoff.

== Regular season ==
=== Group A ===
Qualified for the playoffs

	(Serbia) SWI	(North Macedonia) FEN	(Bulgaria) CHE	(Serbia) RAD	(Romania) BRA
(Serbia) SWI		106-72	85-73	72-77	76-55
(North Macedonia) FEN	70-75		87-74	92-60	86-75
(Bulgaria) CHE	71-98	83-74		86-79	104-96
(Serbia) RAD	72-88	63-74	78-63		79-77
(Romania) BRA	70-84	87-86	80-82	85-75	

	Team	Pld	W	L	PF	PA	Diff	Pts
1.	(Serbia) Swisslion Takovo	8	7	1	684	560	+124	15
2.	(North Macedonia) Feni Industries	8	4	4	641	623	+18	12
3.	(Bulgaria) Euroins Cherno More	8	4	4	636	677	−41	12
4.	(Serbia) Radnički 034 Group	8	3	5	583	637	−54	11
5.	(Romania) Cuadripol Brașov	8	2	6	625	672	−47	10

=== Group B ===
Qualified for the playoffs

	(Bulgaria) RIL	(North Macedonia) RAB	(Bulgaria) LEV	(Serbia) MEG	(Romania) DIN
(Bulgaria) RIL		72-65	95-91	97-96	91-75
(North Macedonia) RAB	87-92		98-88	90-89	67-51
(Bulgaria) LEV	75-73	74-83		80-81	102-73
(Serbia) MEG	84-85	77-68	71-79		82-74
(Romania) DIN	88-79	66-72	69-86	67-74	

	Team	Pld	W	L	PF	PA	Diff	Pts
1.	(Bulgaria) Rilski Sportist	8	6	2	684	661	+23	14
2.	(North Macedonia) Feršped Rabotnički	8	5	3	630	609	+21	13
3.	(Bulgaria) Levski Sofia	8	4	4	675	643	+32	12
4.	(Serbia) Mega Hypo Leasing	8	4	4	654	640	+14	12
5.	(Romania) Dinamo București	8	1	7	563	653	−90	9

== Quarterfinals ==
First legs were on 25 and 26 February and 6 March, second legs were held on March 3, 4 and 10th

Team #1	Agg.	Team #2	1st leg	2nd leg
Mega Hypo Leasing (Serbia)	159−158	(Serbia) Swisslion Takovo	81−70	78−88
Euroins Cherno More (Bulgaria)	139−143	(North Macedonia) Feršped Rabotnički	78−62	61−81
Levski Sofia (Bulgaria)	153−156	(North Macedonia) Feni Industries	91−75	62−81
Radnički 034 Group (Serbia)	148−184	(Bulgaria) Rilski Sportist	81−91	67−93

== Final four ==
Semifinals; March 24
Arena Samokov − Samokov
(Bulgaria) Rilski Sportist	83
(Serbia) Mega Hypo Leasing	81
Arena Samokov − Samokov
(North Macedonia) Feni Industries	62
(North Macedonia) Feršped Rabotnički	90

Final; March 25
Arena Samokov − Samokov
(Bulgaria) Rilski Sportist	84
(North Macedonia) Feršped Rabotnički	77
Third place March 25
Arena Samokov − Samokov
(Serbia) Mega Hypo Leasing	78
(North Macedonia) Feni Industries	60

Balkan League 2009 Champions

Rilski Sportist
First title
