= 2019–20 BIBL season =

11th edition of Balkan International Basketball League

2019–20 BIBL
- Season: 2019–20
- Dates: October 2019 – April 2020
- Games played: 40
- Teams: 5
- TV partner(s): sportmedia.tv YouTube; RTSH

Finals
- Champions: not awarded
- Runners-up: not awarded

The 2019–20 BIBL season was the 11th edition of Balkan International Basketball League (BIBL). The competition started October 2019. Five teams participated this season, one from Bulgaria, Montenegro, Albania and two from Kosovo. The league was suspended in March 2020 due to the COVID-19 pandemic, initially envisioned to resume with the completion of the final four just prior to the next season and ultimately cancelled in late June.

== Teams ==
- (1) (Bulgaria) Academic Bultex 99
- (2) (Kosovo) Peja
- (3) (Kosovo) Rahoveci
- (4) (Montenegro) Ibar Rožaje
- (5) (Albania) Vllaznia

== Final Four ==
Semifinals
(Bulgaria) Academic Bultex 99	-
(Montenegro) Ibar Rožaje	-
(Kosovo) Peja	-
(Kosovo) Rahoveci	-

Final
-	-
(Kosovo)	-
Third place
-	-
(Kosovo)	-
