= 2011–12 BIBL season =

2011–12 BIBL
- Season: 2011–12
- Teams: 12

Finals
- Champions: (Israel) Hapoel Gilboa Galil
- Runners-up: (Bulgaria) Levski Sofia

In the fourth season of the Balkan International Basketball League, twelve participants from the Republic of Macedonia, Bulgaria, Romania, Serbia, Montenegro, Bosnia and Herzegovina and the new represented country Israel has competed.

== Teams ==
| Country | Teams | Teams | |
|---|---|---|---|
| Bulgaria | 2 | Levski Sofia | Rilski Sportist |
| Israel | 2 | Hapoel Tel Aviv | Hapoel Gilboa Galil |
| (North Macedonia) Macedonia | 2 | Feni Industries | Torus |
| Montenegro | 2 | Mornar | Ulcinj |
| Serbia | 2 | OKK Beograd | Napredak Kruševac |
| Bosnia and Herzegovina | 1 | Zrinjski Mostar | |
| Romania | 1 | Elba Timișoara | |

== Format ==
=== Regular season ===
In the regular season the teams will be divided into two groups, each containing six teams. Each team plays every other team in its group at home and away. The two teams that finished at the top of their group advance to the final four. The teams that finish second and third in their group advance to the quarterfinals.

The opening game has been played on October 11, 2011 and the last match day will be played on March 7, 2012.

=== Quarterfinals ===
The teams that finished second in their home played against the third placed teams in the other group in a Best-Of-3 series with home advantage. The first legs are on March 21 and 22, second legs will be played on March 28 and 29. If there is need for third leg the date is set for April 5, 2012.

=== Final four ===
The four remaining teams play a semifinal match and the winners of those advance to the final. The losers play in a third-place playoff. This year's dates are April 20 and 22, 2012.

== Regular season ==
=== Group A ===
| Qualified for the final four |
| Qualified for the playoffs |

| | (Israel) HGG | (Montenegro) MOR | (Bulgaria) RIL | (Romania) ELB | (Serbia) OKK | (North Macedonia) TOR |
|---|---|---|---|---|---|---|
| (Israel) HGG | | 92-67 | 76-67 | 91-73 | 84-62 | 85-62 |
| (Montenegro) MOR | 76-78 | | 89-76 | 79-77 | 75-73 | 84-68 |
| (Bulgaria) RIL | 72-70 | 87-76 | | 80-78 | 87-70 | 92-74 |
| (Romania) ELB | 76-83 | 88-73 | 80-69 | | 85-67 | 72-74 |
| (Serbia) OKK | 71-74 | 82-89 | 86-68 | 75-84 | | 87-81 |
| (North Macedonia) TOR | 70-86 | 79-84 | 80-85 | 63-73 | 75-70 | |

| | Team | Pld | W | L | PF | PA | Diff | Pts |
|---|---|---|---|---|---|---|---|---|
| 1. | (Israel) Hapoel Gilboa Galil | 10 | 9 | 1 | 819 | 696 | +123 | 19 |
| 2. | (Montenegro) Mornar | 10 | 6 | 4 | 792 | 800 | −8 | 16 |
| 3. | (Bulgaria) Rilski Sportist | 10 | 6 | 4 | 783 | 779 | +4 | 16 |
| 4. | (Romania) Elba Timișoara | 10 | 5 | 5 | 786 | 754 | +32 | 15 |
| 5. | (Serbia) OKK Beograd | 10 | 2 | 8 | 743 | 802 | −59 | 12 |
| 6. | (North Macedonia) Torus | 10 | 2 | 8 | 726 | 818 | −92 | 12 |

=== Group B ===
| Qualified for the final four |
| Qualified for the playoffs |

| | (Bulgaria) LEV | (Israel) HTA | (North Macedonia) FEN | (Serbia) NAP | (Bosnia and Herzegovina) ZRI | (Montenegro) ULC |
|---|---|---|---|---|---|---|
| (Bulgaria) LEV | | 85-78 | 67-66 | 74-72 | 63-57 | 20-0 |
| (Israel) HTA | 79-86 | | 83-76 | 74-66 | 90-86 | 75-68 |
| (North Macedonia) FEN | 84-91 | 82-85 | | 77-72 | 20-0 | 81-80 |
| (Serbia) NAP | 67-92 | 80-82 | 81-77 | | 79-59 | 73-72 |
| (Bosnia and Herzegovina) ZRI | 59-69 | 67-85 | 68-76 | 62-64 | | 60-62 |
| (Montenegro) ULC | 73-75 | 0-20 | 53-59 | 0-20 | 69-82 | |

| | Team | Pld | W | L | PF | PA | Diff | Pts |
|---|---|---|---|---|---|---|---|---|
| 1. | (Bulgaria) Levski Sofia | 10 | 10 | 0 | 722 | 635 | +87 | 20 |
| 2. | (Israel) Hapoel Tel Aviv | 10 | 8 | 2 | 751 | 696 | +55 | 18 |
| 3. | (North Macedonia) Feni Industries | 10 | 5 | 5 | 698 | 680 | +18 | 15 |
| 4. | (Serbia) Napredak Kruševac | 10 | 5 | 5 | 674 | 669 | +5 | 15 |
| 5. | (Bosnia and Herzegovina) Zrinjski Mostar | 10 | 1 | 9 | 600 | 677 | −77 | 10 |
| 6. | (Montenegro) Ulcinj | 10 | 1 | 9 | 477 | 565 | −88 | 8 |

== Quarterfinals ==
First legs are on March 20 and 28; Second legs are on March 27 and April 3; Third leg, if needed, is on March 29 and April 6

| Team 1 | Agg. | Team 2 | 1st leg | 2nd leg | 3rd leg |
|---|---|---|---|---|---|
| Rilski Sportist (Bulgaria) | 1 − 2 | (Israel) Hapoel Tel Aviv | 83−78 | 63−84 | 60−78 |
| Feni Industries (North Macedonia) | 2 − 0 | (Montenegro) Mornar | 92−85 OT | 83−82 | — |

== Final four ==
Semifinals; 21 April
Gan Ner - Gan Ner Sports Hall
(Bulgaria) Levski Sofia | 86
(North Macedonia) Feni Kavadarci | 76
Gan Ner - Gan Ner Sports Hall
(Israel) Hapoel Gilboa Galil | 88
(Israel) Hapoel Tel Aviv | 72

Final; 23 April
Gan Ner - Gan Ner Sports Hall
(Bulgaria) Levski Sofia | 84
(Israel) Hapoel Gilboa Galil | 89
