= 2022–23 BIBL season =

2022–23 BIBL
- League: Balkan International Basketball League
- Season: 2022–23
- Dates: 27 October 22 – April 2023
- Teams: 7
- TV partner(s): sportmedia.tv YouTube; RTSH

Finals
- Champions: (Israel) Hapoel Be'er Sheva/Dimona
- Runners-up: (Kosovo) Peja
- Semifinalists: (Bulgaria) Beroe (Montenegro) Milenijum Podgorica

Seasons
- ← 2021–22 2023–24 →
- All statistics correct as of 6 March 2025.

The 2022–23 BIBL season is the 15th edition of Balkan International Basketball League (BIBL). The first match in the group stage is expected to take place in October 2022. Teams from Israel, Bulgaria, Montenegro, Kosovo and Ukraine are expected to participate in this competition.

== Format ==
Seven teams will play against each other home-and-away basis. The teams placed 1st and 2nd will advance to the Final Four. while those place 3rd, 4th, 5th and 6th will play in the Quarterfinals to determine the other two teams to advance to the Final Four.

== Teams ==
Regular season
(Bulgaria) Beroe	(Kosovo) KB Peja	(Israel) Hapoel Be'er Sheva/Dimona	(Ukraine) BC Budivelnyk
(Bulgaria) Levski Sofia	(Kosovo) Bashkimi Prizren	(Montenegro) Milenijum Podgorica	

== Regular season ==
Pos	Team	Pld	W	L	PF	PA	PD	Pts	Qualification	HBS	PJA	BER	MIL	BUD	BAS	LEV
1	(Israel) Hapoel Be'er Sheva/Dimona	12	11	1	900	726	+174	23	Advance to Final Four	—	88–81	109–61	97–62	92–94	20–0 (Note: The results of the canceled games are 20-0 to the opponents without points in the classification for the losing teams.)	100–67
2	(Kosovo) Peja	12	10	2	953	811	+142	22	Advance to Final Four	88–89	—	125–93	96–82	81–71	76–72	20–0 (Note: The results of the canceled games are 20-0 to the opponents without points in the classification for the losing teams.)
3	(Bulgaria) Beroe	12	5	7	815	933	−118	17	Advance to Final Four	77–84	78–111	—	95–63	65–86	80–89	85–82
4	(Montenegro) Milenijum Podgorica	12	4	8	755	877	−122	16	Advance to Final Four	70–74	76–89	99–93	—	76–91	20–0 (Note: The match was not played due to many cases of illness within KB Bashkimi. The league management decided to grant KK Milenijum a technical victory after consulting with FIBA and after no further date was found for the match.)	20–0 (Note: The results of the canceled games are 20-0 to the opponents without points in the classification for the losing teams.)
5	(Ukraine) Budivelnyk (Note: Budivelnyk withdrew from the Balkan International Basketball League due to lack of funding.)	12	6	6	628	512	+116	13	Withdraw	0–20 (Note: The results of the canceled games are 20-0 to the opponents without points in the classification for the losing teams.)	0–20 (Note: The results of the canceled games are 20-0 to the opponents without points in the classification for the losing teams.)	0–20 (Note: The results of the canceled games are 20-0 to the opponents without points in the classification for the losing teams.)	102–69	—	—	—
6	(Kosovo) Bashkimi (Note: Bashkimi has been disqualified from the Balkan International Basketball League due to their inability not to play their away games.)	12	2	10	513	611	−98	10	Disqualified	60–81	88–120	0–20 (Note: The results of the canceled games are 20-0 to the opponents without points in the classification for the losing teams.)	58–66	62–89	—	—
7	(Bulgaria) Levski Sofia (Note: Levski has been disqualified from the Balkan International Basketball League due to their unilateral decision not to play their away games in Kosovo.)	12	1	11	602	696	−94	9	Disqualified	66–86	74–86	85–88	82–72	67–95	79–84	—

Updated to match(es) played on March 20, 2022. Source: Regula Season standing

== Final Four ==
Semi-finals
28 April 2023
(Israel) Hapoel Be'er Sheva/Dimona	123
(Montenegro) Milenijum Podgorica	72
28 April 2023
(Kosovo) Peja	124
(Bulgaria) Beroe	82

Final
30 April 2023
(Israel) Hapoel Be'er Sheva/Dimona	99
(Kosovo) Peja	95
Third place
30 April 2023
(Montenegro) Milenijum Podgorica	87
(Bulgaria) Beroe	100

=== Semifinals ===
28 April 2023	Hapoel Be'er Sheva/Dimona (Israel)	123–72	(Montenegro) Milenijum Podgorica	Stara Zagora
16:30	Scoring by quarter: 34−17, 30−21, 34−22, 25−12
	Pts: Zipper 21; Rebs: Porat 6 Asts: Segal 11; PIR: Demps 25	Boxscore	Pts: Mandić 24; Rebs: Djukić 6 Asts: Raičević 5 PIR: Mandić 21	Arena: Obshtinska zala Ivan Vazov; Referees: Alija Ferevski, Diamantis Lortos, Sava Četković

28 April 2023	Peja (Kosovo)	124–82	(Bulgaria) Beroe	Stara Zagora
19:15	Scoring by quarter: 35−20, 34−20, 40−16, 15−26
	Pts: Joseph 36; Rebs: Waldow 10; Asts: Thomas 9 PIR: Joseph 40	Boxscore	Pts: Hall 29; Rebs: Purfoy, Todorović 6 Asts: Todorović 4 PIR: Hall 26	Arena: Obshtinska zala Ivan Vazov; Referees: Aleksandar Pavlov, Ioannis Agrafiotis, Stefan Kuburović

=== Third place ===
30 April 2023	Milenijum Podgorica (Montenegro)	87–100	(Bulgaria) Beroe	Stara Zagora
17:00	Scoring by quarter: 23−27, 25−27, 25−24, 14−22
	Pts: Jovanović 17; Rebs: Ivanović 5 Asts: Raičević 7 PIR: Jovanović 19	Boxscore	Pts: Hall 20; Rebs: Purfoy, Todorović 8 Asts: Purfoy, Stefanov 6 PIR: Purfoy 22	Arena: Obshtinska zala Ivan Vazov; Referees: Aleksandar Pavlov, Ioannis Agrafiotis, Stefan Kuburović

=== Final ===
30 April 2023	Hapoel Be'er Sheva/Dimona (Israel)	99–95	(Kosovo) Peja	Stara Zagora
19:30	Scoring by quarter: 31−20, 28−33, 16−25, 24−17
	Pts: Efianayi 28; Rebs: Whittington 8 Asts: Segal 6 PIR: Whittington 35	Boxscore	Pts: Joseph 31; Rebs: Waldow 15; Asts: Thomas 6 PIR: Waldow 27	Arena: Obshtinska zala Ivan Vazov; Referees: Alija Ferevski, Diamantis Lortos, Sava Četković

2022–23 Balkan League Champions
(Israel) Hapoel Be'er Sheva/Dimona
1st title
