= KK Teodo Tivat =

Teodo Tivat
- Nickname: Teodosi
- Leagues: Montenegrin League; Adriatic League
- Founded: 2005
- Arena: Dvorana Župa Tivat
- Location: Tivat, Montenegro
- Team colors: Blue and Yellow
- President: Ivan Pekovic
- Head coach: Mirko Prorokovic
- Assistant: Aleksandar Ivkovic

KK Teodo (Montenegrin Cyrillic: КК Теодо) is a professional basketball club from Tivat, Montenegro. The team currently competes in Montenegrin Basketball League and regional BIBL League. A school for all ages and categories has been organized within the club.

== Supporters ==
Teodo fans are known as Teodosi. The group's traditional colours are blue and yellow, which are also the colours of Teodo basketball club.

== Honours ==
=== Domestic competitions ===
==== League ====
Runner up of the Montenegrin 1B League for the season 2008-2009

=== Regional competitions ===
Participation in BIBL League for the season 2012-13

== Players ==
=== Current roster ===
Teodo Tivat roster
Players
Coaches

Pos.	No.	Nat.	Name	Ht.		Age
SG		(Montenegro)	Anđelić, Marko	2.02 m (6 ft 8 in)		29 – 1 May 1997
PG	34	(Montenegro)	Bakić, Filip	1.93 m (6 ft 4 in)	88 kg (194 lb)	29 – 2 January 1997
SF	6	(Montenegro)	Danilović, Pavle	2.03 m (6 ft 8 in)	88 kg (194 lb)	27 – 25 June 1999
SF	5	(Montenegro)	Đurišić, Miloš	1.94 m (6 ft 4 in)	86 kg (190 lb)	38 – 8 January 1988
SF	21	(Montenegro)	Grković, Marko	2.00 m (6 ft 7 in)		29 – 21 January 1997
SF	35	(Montenegro)	Kaluđerović, Vladan	1.96 m (6 ft 5 in)		28 – 4 March 1998
SF	15	(Montenegro)	Radonjić, Igor	1.95 m (6 ft 5 in)	88 kg (194 lb)	38 – 8 April 1988
PF	13	(Serbia)	Rondović, Nikola	2.07 m (6 ft 9 in)		35 – 27 March 1991
C	31	(Montenegro)	Savić, Milovan	2.05 m (6 ft 9 in)		38 – 27 October 1987
C	33	(Montenegro)	Sekulović, Mihailo	2.06 m (6 ft 9 in)	97 kg (214 lb)	35 – 22 July 1991
SF	28	(Montenegro)	Vučurović, Nikola	2.01 m (6 ft 7 in)		46 – 17 May 1980
G/F	8	(Montenegro)	Vušović, Vasilije	1.91 m (6 ft 3 in)	92 kg (203 lb)	32 – 21 April 1994

Head coach

- (Montenegro) Mirko Proroković

Assistant coach(es)

- Aleksandar Ivkovic

Legend

- (C) Team captain
- Injured

- Roster
Updated: 20 April 2018

== Sponsorships ==
Official Shirt Sponsors:	Aerodromi Crne Gore	HTP Primorje
