= 2009–10 BIBL season =

2009–10 BIBL
- Season: 2009–10
- Teams: 12

Finals
- Champions: (Bulgaria) Levski Sofia
- Runners-up: (Montenegro) Lovćen

In the second season of the Balkan International Basketball League are competing ten participants from the Republic of Macedonia, Bulgaria, Romania, Serbia and Montenegro.

== Teams ==
Country	Teams	Teams			
Bulgaria	4	Spartak Pleven	Rilski Sportist	Levski Sofia	Euroins Cherno More
(North Macedonia) Macedonia	2	Rabotnički	Feni Industries		
Serbia	2	Metalac Valjevo	OKK Beograd		
Montenegro	2	Mornar	Lovćen		
Romania	2	Gaz Metan Mediaș	Steaua Turabo		

== Format ==
=== Regular season ===
In the regular season the teams will be divided into two groups, each containing five teams. Each team plays every other team in its group at home and away. The top 4 teams in each group advance to the playoffs. Games will be played from October 10, 2009 to March 3, 2010.

=== Quarterfinals ===
The top four teams in each group advance for the quarterfinals. The winner of Group A/Group B will play with the fourth placed team in Group B/Group A and the second placed team in Group A/Group B will play with the third in Group B/Group A.

=== Final four ===
The four remaining teams play a semifinal match and the winners of those advance to the final. The losers play in a third-place playoff.

== Regular season ==
=== Group A ===
Qualified for the playoffs

	(Montenegro) LOV	(Serbia) MET	(Bulgaria) CHE	(Bulgaria) RIL	(North Macedonia) RAB
(Montenegro) LOV		64-54	90-77	80-83	104-50
(Serbia) MET	63-82		85-67	77-70	88-63
(Bulgaria) CHE	77-71	85-73		91-90	86-76
(Bulgaria) RIL	74-69	74-82	88-77		111-65
(North Macedonia) RAB	102-108	61-80	61-96	80-76	

	Team	Pld	W	L	PF	PA	Diff	Pts
1.	(Montenegro) Lovćen	8	5	3	668	580	+88	13
2.	(Serbia) Metalac Valjevo	8	5	3	602	566	+36	13
3.	(Bulgaria) Euroins Cherno More	8	5	3	656	634	+22	13
4.	(Bulgaria) Rilski Sportist	8	4	4	666	621	+45	12
5.	(North Macedonia) Rabotnički	8	1	7	558	749	−121	9
6.	(Romania) Gaz Metan Mediaș	Disqualified						

=== Group B ===
Qualified for the playoffs

	(Bulgaria) LEV	(North Macedonia) FEN	(Serbia) OKK	(Montenegro) MOR	(Bulgaria) SPA	(Romania) STE
(Bulgaria) LEV		90-88	92-84	109-85	113-82	92-61
(North Macedonia) FEN	88-86		101-76	85-69	93-79	93-73
(Serbia) OKK	103-100	91-89		84-77	77-58	85-70
(Montenegro) MOR	80-105	69-88	80-73		83-71	66-59
(Bulgaria) SPA	79-91	85-93	93-94	77-60		103-96
(Romania) STE	69-75	64-70	92-76	75-83	105-102	

	Team	Pld	W	L	PF	PA	Diff	Pts
1.	(Bulgaria) Levski Sofia	10	8	2	953	819	+134	18
2.	(North Macedonia) Feni Industries	10	8	2	888	782	+106	18
3.	(Serbia) OKK Beograd	10	6	4	843	852	−9	16
4.	(Montenegro) Mornar	10	4	6	752	826	−74	14
5.	(Bulgaria) Spartak Pleven	10	2	8	829	905	−76	12
6.	(Romania) Steaua Turabo	10	2	8	764	845	−81	12

== Quarterfinals ==
First legs were held on March 18; second legs were on March 24 and March 25

Team 1	Agg.	Team 2	1st leg	2nd leg
Mornar (Montenegro)	153−164	(Montenegro) Lovcen Cetinje	77−80	76−84
Feni Industries (North Macedonia)	167−151	(Serbia) Metalac Valjevo	88−88	79−63
Levski Sofia (Bulgaria)	184−173	(Bulgaria) Rilski Sportist	75−89	109−84
Euroins Cherno More (Bulgaria)	173−171	(Serbia) OKK Beograd	92−87	81−84

== Final four ==
Semifinals; April 13
Universiada Hall − Sofia
(Montenegro) Lovćen	81
(North Macedonia) Feni Industries	74
Universiada Hall − Sofia
(Bulgaria) Levski Sofia	91
(Bulgaria) Euroins Cherno More	76

Final; April 15
Universiada Hall − Sofia
(Montenegro) Lovćen	65
(Bulgaria) Levski Sofia	77

Balkan League 2010 Champions

Levski Sofia
First title
