= Haim Ohayon Sports Hall =

Indoor sporting arena located in Gan Ner, Israel

Coordinates: 32°31′53″N 35°20′19″E

Gan Ner Sports Hall
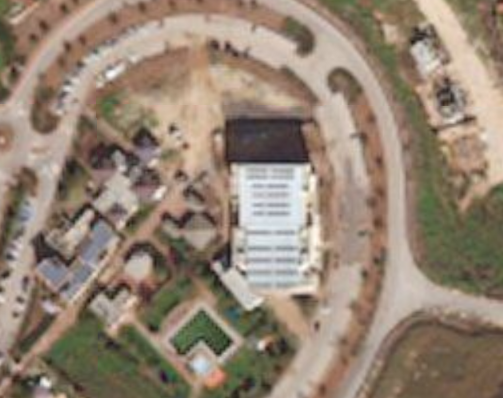
- Location: Gan Ner
- Owner: Gilboa Regional Council
- Capacity: 2,057

Construction
- Opened: 2008
- Expanded: 2010

Tenant
- Hapoel Gilboa Galil

The Haim Ohayon Sports Hall (Hebrew: היכל הספורט חיים אוחיון) is an indoor sporting arena located in Gan Ner, Israel, and is the home of basketball team Hapoel Gilboa Galil.

When the arena was inaugurated in 2008 it held 900 seats. The arena was expanded to 2,057 in 2010 to meet ULEB criteria for hosting a game in the Eurocup competition. The arena has not been approved even after the expansion, as ULEB demand a capacity of 3,000 seats.

In April 2012, the arena hosted the 2011–12 BIBL final four, which saw the home team take the cup.
