= 2012–13 BIBL season =

Basketball season

2012–13 BIBL
- Season: 2012–13
- Teams: 10

Finals
- Champions: (Israel) Hapoel Gilboa Galil
- Runners-up: (Bulgaria) Levski Sofia

In the fifth season of the Balkan International Basketball League, twelve participants from the Republic of Macedonia, Bulgaria, Serbia, Montenegro, Israel, Croatia and the new represented country Greece has competed.

== Teams ==
Country	Teams	Teams	
Bulgaria	2	Levski Sofia	Rilski Sportist
(North Macedonia) Macedonia	2	Kumanovo	Kozuv
Montenegro	2	KK Teodo	Mornar
Croatia	1	Đuro Đaković	
Greece	1	Kavala	
Israel	1	Hapoel Gilboa Galil	
Serbia	1	OKK Beograd	

== Format ==
=== First round ===
In the first round the teams were divided into two groups, each containing five teams. Each team played every other team in its group at home and away. The three teams that finished at the top of their group advanced to second round (or Group C). The teams that finished fourth and fifth in their group advanced to another group (or Group D).

The opening game has been played on October 16, 2012 and the last match day was played on January 15, 2013.

=== Second round ===
The six teams, qualified for group C, kept the results between them from the first stage and played with the three teams from the other group home and away games. The first four teams in the final standing in group C qualified for the Final Four.

The four teams, qualified for group D, also kept the results between them from the first stage and played with the two teams from the other group home and away games.

The first game was played on January 22, 2013 and the last match day was played on April 3, 2013.

=== Final four ===
The four remaining teams played a semifinal match and the winners of those advanced to the final. The losers played in a third-place playoff. The dates of the Final Four were April 19 and 21, 2013.

== First round ==
=== Group A ===
	Team	Pld	W	L	PF	PA	Diff	Pts
1.	(Israel) Hapoel Gilboa Galil	8	6	2	626	526	+100	14
2.	(Bulgaria) Levski Sofia	8	5	3	669	610	+59	13
3.	(North Macedonia) Kumanovo	8	4	4	590	642	−52	12
4.	(Croatia) Đuro Đaković	8	4	4	589	617	−28	12
5.	(Montenegro) Mornar	8	1	7	560	639	−79	9

	ĐĐ	HGG	KUM	LEV	MOR
(Croatia) Đuro Đaković		69–101	84–77	82–71	85–79
(Israel) Hapoel Gilboa Galil	66–59		81–61	72–70	81–57
(North Macedonia) Kumanovo	83–67	74–66		87–80	71–69
(Bulgaria) Levski Sofia	77–73	87–79	103–66		92–67
(Montenegro) Mornar	63–70	49–80	92–71	84–89	

=== Group B ===
	Team	Pld	W	L	PF	PA	Diff	Pts
1.	(Bulgaria) Rilski Sportist	8	5	3	700	604	+96	13
2.	(Montenegro) Teodo	8	5	3	635	617	+18	13
3.	(Greece) Kavala	8	4	4	630	679	−49	12
4.	(North Macedonia) Kozuv	8	4	4	596	624	−28	12
5.	(Serbia) OKK Beograd	8	2	6	617	654	−37	10

	KAV	KOZ	OKK	RS	TEO
(Greece) Kavala		87–77	81–76	81–79	89–85
(North Macedonia) Kozuv	79–74		82–77	76–99	84–71
(Serbia) OKK Beograd	85–76	66–74		83–82	74–75
(Bulgaria) Rilski Sportist	100–71	75–56	104–86		87–67
(Montenegro) Teodo	98–71	75–68	80–70	84–74	

== Second round ==
=== Group C ===
	Team	Pld	W	L	PF	PA	Diff	Pts
1.	(Bulgaria) Levski Sofia	10	8	2	841	735	+106	18
2.	(Israel) Hapoel Gilboa Galil	10	6	4	847	783	+64	16
3.	(Bulgaria) Rilski Sportist	10	5	5	840	838	+2	15
4.	(North Macedonia) Kumanovo	10	5	5	824	891	−67	15
5.	(Greece) Kavala	10	4	6	798	849	−51	14
6.	(Montenegro) Teodo	10	2	8	830	884	−54	12

	HGG	KAV	KUM	LEV	RS	TEO
(Israel) Hapoel Gilboa Galil		73–78	81–61	72–70	84–85	102–92
(Greece) Kavala	75–94		95–62	73–77	81–79	89–85
(North Macedonia) Kumanovo	74–66	94–92		87–80	114–117	96–90
(Bulgaria) Levski Sofia	87–79	88–73	103–66		84–62	90–82
(Bulgaria) Rilski Sportist	79–104	100–71	88–75	69–74		87–67
(Montenegro) Teodo	82–92	98–71	79–95	72–88	84–74	

=== Group D ===
	Team	Pld	W	L	PF	PA	Diff	Pts
7.	(North Macedonia) Kozuv	6	5	1	473	428	+45	11
8.	(Croatia) Đuro Đaković	6	3	3	456	465	−9	9
9.	(Montenegro) Mornar	6	3	3	479	487	−8	9
10.	(Serbia) OKK Beograd	6	1	5	481	509	−28	7

	ĐĐ	KOZ	MOR	OKK
(Croatia) Đuro Đaković		72–89	85–79	68–69
(North Macedonia) Kozuv	75–62		72–64	82–77
(Montenegro) Mornar	63–70	87–81		102–96
(Serbia) OKK Beograd	90−99	66–74	83–84	

== Final four ==
Semifinals; April 19
Arena Samokov − Samokov
(Israel) Hapoel Gilboa Galil	85
(North Macedonia) Kumanovo	76
Arena Samokov − Samokov
(Bulgaria) Levski Sofia	83
(Bulgaria) Rilski Sportist	74

Final; April 21
Arena Samokov − Samokov
(Israel) Hapoel Gilboa Galil	87
(Bulgaria) Levski Sofia	79
Third place April 21
Arena Samokov − Samokov
(North Macedonia) Kumanovo	77
(Bulgaria) Rilski Sportist	85
