= Hapoel HaEmek =

Hapoel Gilat HaEmek
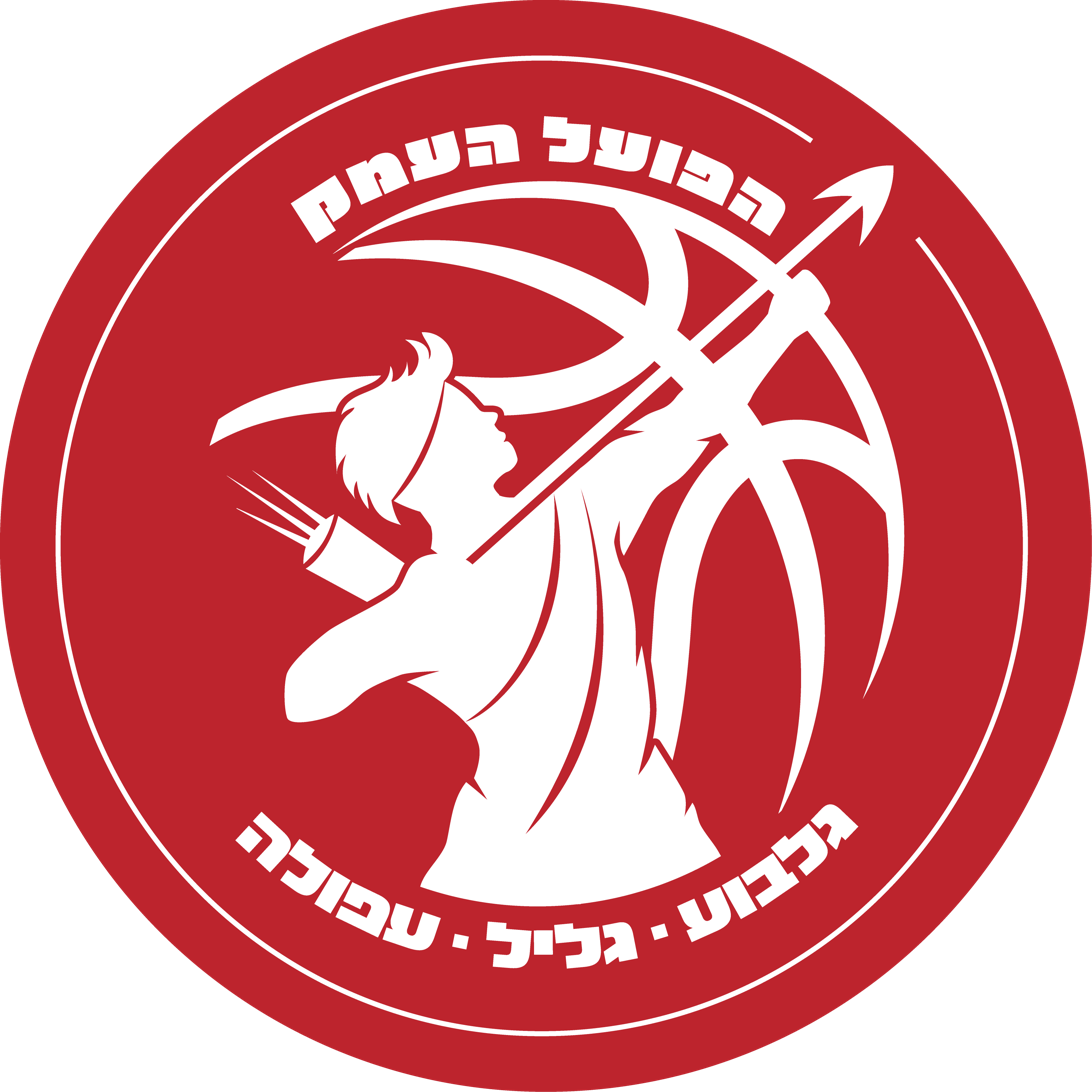
- Leagues: Israeli Basketball Premier League
- Founded: 2008; 18 years ago
- History: Hapoel Gilboa Galil; 2008–2025; Hapoel Gilat Telecom HaEmek; 2025–present
- Arena: Gan Ner Sports Hall
- Capacity: 2,250
- Location: Gan Ner, Israel
- CEO: Michal Verdiger
- Head coach: Guy Goodes
- Team captain: Roey Netzia
- Ownership: Gideon Yadin
- Championships: 1 Israeli Championships; 2 Balkan Leagues
- Website: https://hapoelhaemek.co.il/
Home	Away

Hapoel Gilat HaEmek (Hebrew: הפועל העמק), also known as Hapoel Gilat Telecom HaEmek due to sponsorship reasons, are a professional basketball club based in Gan Ner, north-east Israel. The club plays its home game in the Israeli Basketball Premier League (the top tier of Israeli basketball) in a 2,250-seat arena in Gan Ner.

== History ==
The club was founded in 2008 after Hapoel Gilboa (which had previously been merged with Hapoel Afula, which regained its independence) receive the top-division license in the Israeli Basketball Premier League of Hapoel Galil Elyon.

Initially it was believed to be a merger agreement, as they originally planned to play 70% of the club's home domestic league games at Gan Ner Sports Hall in Gan Ner (a village of 2,700 people near Mount Gilboa, in the Galilee in northern Israel) and 30% of their home domestic league games in Hapoel Galil Elyon's arena in Kfar Blum. But the agreement never came to fruition as Hapoel Galil Elyon rejected the merger, and all of the club's home domestic league games were played in Gan Ner, essentially making them a new team. Galil Elyon was re-established in 2009, as a lower-division team.

In May 2010, Hapoel Gilboa Galil won the Israeli Championship, after defeating defending champions Maccabi Tel Aviv by a score of 90–77 in the finals of the playoffs.

In the summer of 2018, the club had financial difficulties, and a large part of it was purchased by fans.

== Current roster ==
Note: Flags indicate national team eligibility at FIBA-sanctioned events. Players may hold other non-FIBA nationalities not displayed.

Hapoel HaEmek roster
Players
Coaches

Pos.	No.	Nat.	Name	Ht.	Age
PF	0	(United States)	Guzmán, Karel	1.95 m (6 ft 5 in)	31 – 7 February 1995
G	1	(United States)	Cobbs, Justin	1.91 m (6 ft 3 in)	35 – 16 March 1991
G/F	3	(United States) (Israel)	Kaplan, JJ	1.96 m (6 ft 5 in)	29 – 28 May 1997
PF	7	(United States)	Hall, Malik	2.03 m (6 ft 8 in)	26 – 25 July 2000
SF	9	(Israel)	Menco, Rafi	2.00 m (6 ft 7 in)	32 – 5 March 1994
G	11	(Israel)	Solomon, Ran	1.85 m (6 ft 1 in)	25 – 31 March 2001
SF	14	(Israel)	Netzia, Roey (C)	1.97 m (6 ft 6 in)	28 – 27 November 1997
G	15	(United States)	Henry, Cameron	1.98 m (6 ft 6 in)	27 – 8 March 1999
F	16	(United States)	Elleby, C. J.	1.98 m (6 ft 6 in)	26 – 16 June 2000
F/C	17	(Nigeria)	Mekowulu, Christian	2.06 m (6 ft 9 in)	31 – 17 March 1995
PG	25	(Israel)	Noyovitch, Gil	1.81 m (5 ft 11 in)	25 – 1 September 2001
PG	44	(Israel)	Misgav, Niv	1.81 m (5 ft 11 in)	31 – 25 July 1995
F/C	50	(Israel)	Erez, Shahar	2.00 m (6 ft 7 in)	22 – 24 February 2004

Head coach

- (Israel) Guy Goodes

Assistant coach(es)

- (Israel) Golan Jablonowsky
- Adi Israel

Legend

- (C) Team captain
- Injured

- Roster
Updated: November 13, 2026

== Honors ==
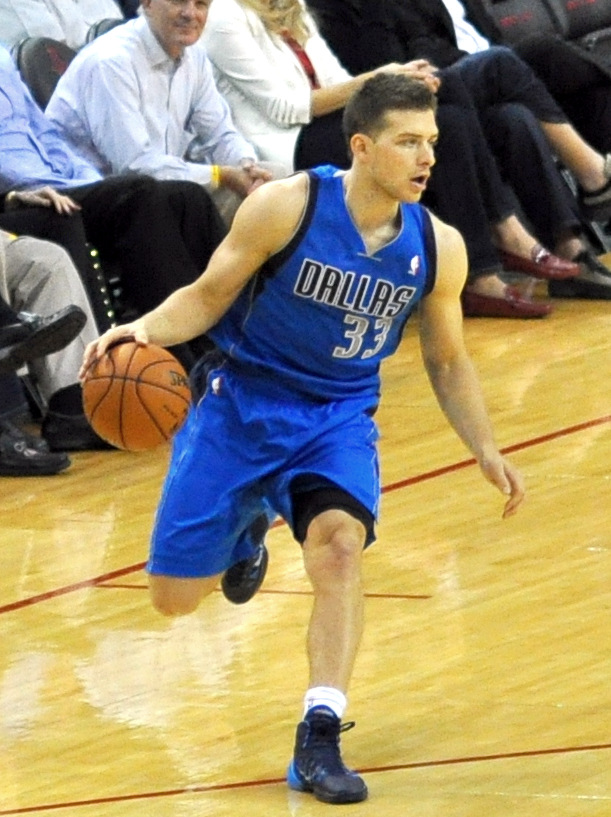
Gal Mekel

Total titles: 3

=== Domestic competitions ===
- Israeli Championships
  - Winners (1): 2010
  - Runners-up (1): 2011

=== Regional competitions ===
- Balkan League
  - Winners (2): 2012, 2013
  - Runners-up (1): 2014

== Notable players ==
Note: Flags indicate national team eligibility at FIBA-sanctioned events. Players may hold other non-FIBA nationalities not displayed.

Criteria

To appear in this section a player must have either:

- Set a club record or won an individual award while at the club
- Played at least one official international match for their national team at any time
- Played at least one official NBA match at any time.

- (Israel) Dagan Yivzori 5 seasons: '08-'13
- (United States) Brian Roberts 1 season: '08-'09
- (Israel) Elishay Kadir 2 seasons: '08-'10
- (United States) Brian Randle 2 seasons: '08-'10
- (United States) Dion Dowell 2 seasons: '08-'10
- (Israel) Gal Mekel 3 seasons: '08-'11
- (Israel) Guni Israeli 3 seasons: '08-'11
- (Israel) Avishay Gordon 4 seasons: '08-'12
- (United States) Jeremy Pargo 1 season: '09-'10
- (United States) Isaiah Swann 1 season: '09-'10
- (United States) Tyler Wilkerson 1 season: '10-'11
- (United States) Marco Killingsworth 1 season: '10-'11
- (Israel) Ido Kozikaro 2 seasons: '10-'12
- (United States) Romeo Travis 1 season: '11-'12
- (United States) Courtney Fells 1 season: '11-'12
- (United States) Joseph Jones 1 season: '11-'12
- (Spain) (Israel) Jan Martín 1 season: '11-'12
- (Israel) Nimrod Tishman 3 seasons: '11-'14
- (United States) Mitchell Watt 1 season: '12-'13
- (United States) Jamar Smith 1 season: '12-'13
- (United States) Rakim Sanders 1 season: '12-'13
- (Israel) Yaniv Green 2 seasons: '12-'14
- (Israel) Amit Simhon 2 seasons: '12-'14
- (Israel) Joaquin Szuchman 7 seasons: '12-'19
- (United States) (Israel) Adrian Banks 1 season: '13
- (United States) (Israel) Stu Douglass 1 season: '13-'14
- (United States) DeShawn Sims 1 season: '13-'14
- (United States) Kenny Boynton 1 season: '13-'14
- (United States) Gerald Robinson 1 season: '13-'14
- (United States) Alex Young 1 season: '14-'15
- (Israel) Oded Brandwein 1 season: '14-'15
- (Israel) Rafi Menco 1 season: '14-'15
- (Israel) Itay Segev 1 season: '14-'15
- (United States) Demetrius Treadwell 1 season: '15-'16
- (United States) Jason Siggers 2 seasons: '15-'17
- (United States) Eric Griffin 1 season: '16-'17
- (United States) Murphy Holloway 1 season: '16-'17
- (Israel) Tal Karpelesz 3 seasons: '16-'19
- (Israel) (Argentina) Ezequiel Skverer 3 seasons: '16-'19
- (United States) J'Covan Brown 1 season: '17-'18
- (United States) Zach LeDay 1 season: '17-'18
- (United States) D'Angelo Harrison 1 season: '17-'18
- (United States) Bryant Crawford 1 season: '18-'19
- (United States) Ian Miller 1 season: '18-'19
- (United States) Greg Whittington 1 season: '18-'19
- (United States) James Kelly 1 season: '18-'19
