= Balkan International Basketball League =

International basketball league

- Current season, competition or edition: 2023–24 BIBL season
- BIBL Official Logo
- Sport: Basketball
- Founded: 2008
- Folded: 2024
- No. of teams: Variable by season
- Countries: Current countries Bulgaria; Cyprus; Israel; Kosovo; Montenegro; North Macedonia Former countries: Albania; Bosnia and Herzegovina; Croatia; Greece; Kazakhstan; Romania; Serbia; Ukraine
- Continent: FIBA Europe (Europe)
- Last champion: (Kosovo) Sigal Prishtina (3rd title)
- Most titles: (Kosovo) Sigal Prishtina (3 titles)
- Broadcasters: RIK 2 sportmedia.tv YouTube; RTSH
- Website: balkanleague.net

The Balkan International Basketball League (BIBL), also known as the Balkan League and as the Delasport BIBL Balkan League for sponsorship reasons, was a multinational professional basketball league featuring clubs primarily from the Balkans. The league included teams from countries such as Bulgaria, North Macedonia, Montenegro, Kosovo, Cyprus, and Israel. The last BIBL champion was Sigal Prishtina from Kosovo.

The purpose of the BIBL was to provide competitive international play for clubs in the Balkans that might otherwise be unable to participate in international basketball. The league achieved this by providing financial support to all participating clubs to offset the costs associated with international competition. Notably, the league was also the first international league of its kind to include teams from Kosovo.

== Format ==
After the 2017–2018 season, the Balkan International Basketball League introduced a new, simplified competition format. Under this format, the competition typically features between 6 and 8 teams. The tournament is divided into two phases: the regular season, where all participating teams play each other in a double round-robin format, both home and away. Following the conclusion of the regular season, the first- and second-placed teams automatically qualify for the Final Four. The third-placed team plays the sixth-placed team, and the fourth-placed team plays the fifth-placed team in home-and-away games to determine which teams will advance to the Final Four. The winning teams from these matchups then advance to the Final Four to compete for that season's BIBL Balkan League championship.

Additionally, at the start of the 2020–2021 season, 12 teams from Israel participated in the league to ensure access to competitive games during the COVID-19 pandemic.

== Championships ==
Season	Host	Champion	Result	Runner-up	Arena
2008–09	(Bulgaria) Samokov	(Bulgaria) Rilski Sportist	84–77	(North Macedonia) Feršped Rabotnički	Arena Samokov
2009–10	(Bulgaria) Sofia	(Bulgaria) Levski Sofia	77–65	(Montenegro) Lovćen	Universiada Hall
2010–11	(North Macedonia) Kavadarci	(North Macedonia) Feni Industries	88–75	(Bulgaria) Rilski Sportist	Jasmin Sports Hall
2011–12	(Israel) Gan Ner	(Israel) Hapoel Gilboa Galil	89–84	(Bulgaria) Levski Sofia	Gan Ner Sports Hall
2012–13	(Bulgaria) Samokov	(Israel) Hapoel Gilboa Galil	87–79	(Bulgaria) Levski Sofia	Arena Samokov
2013–14	(Kosovo) Pristina	(Bulgaria) Levski Sofia	75–69	(Israel) Hapoel Gilboa Galil	Pallati i Rinisë dhe Sporteve
2014–15	(Kosovo) Pristina (Bulgaria) Samokov	(Kosovo) Sigal Prishtina	74−72 80–71	(Bulgaria) Rilski Sportist	Pallati i Rinisë dhe Sporteve Arena Samokov
2015–16	(Kosovo) Pristina (Montenegro) Bar	(Kosovo) Sigal Prishtina	82−68 68−75	(Montenegro) Mornar	Pallati i Rinisë dhe Sporteve Sportska dvorana Topolica
2016–17	(Bulgaria) Stara Zagora (North Macedonia) Kumanovo	(Bulgaria) Beroe	84−55 77−73	(North Macedonia) Kumanovo	Obshtinska zala Ivan Vazov Sports Hall Kumanovo
2017–18	(Bulgaria) Samokov	(Bulgaria) Levski Sofia	83−72	(Kosovo) Bashkimi	Arena Samokov
2018–19	(Albania) Tirana	(North Macedonia) Blokotehna	82–68	(Albania) Teuta	Feti Borova Sport Hall
2019–20	Cancelled due to COVID-19 pandemic				
2020–21	(Israel) Holon	(Israel) Hapoel Holon	91–75	(Bulgaria) Academic Plovdiv	Holon Toto Hall
2021–22	(Israel) Nahariya	(Israel) Hapoel Galil Elyon	86–70	(Israel) Maccabi Haifa	Ein Sara Sport Hall
2022–23	(Bulgaria) Stara Zagora	(Israel) Hapoel Be'er Sheva/Dimona	99−95	(Kosovo) Peja	Obshtinska zala Ivan Vazov
2023–24	(Cyprus) Limassol	(Kosovo) Sigal Prishtina	72−67	(Cyprus) PAYABL EKA AEL	Nicos Solomonides Arena

=== Titles by club ===
	Club	Championships	Runner-ups	Championship years
1	(Kosovo) Sigal Prishtina	3	—	2014–15, 2015–16, 2023−24
2	(Bulgaria) Levski Sofia	3	2	2009–10, 2013–14, 2017–18
3	(Israel) Hapoel Gilboa Galil	2	1	2011–12, 2012–13
4	(Bulgaria) Rilski Sportist	1	2	2008–09
5	(North Macedonia) Feni Industries	1	—	2010–11
5	(Bulgaria) Beroe	1	—	2016–17
5	(North Macedonia) Blokotehna	1	—	2018–19
5	(Israel) Hapoel Holon	1	—	2020–21
5	(Israel) Hapoel Galil Elyon	1	—	2021–22
5	(Israel) Hapoel Be'er Sheva/Dimona	1	—	2022–23
10	(North Macedonia) Feršped Rabotnički	—	1	
10	(Montenegro) Lovćen	—	1	
10	(Montenegro) Mornar	—	1	
10	(North Macedonia) Kumanovo	—	1	
10	(Kosovo) Bashkimi	—	1	
10	(Albania) Teuta	—	1	
10	(Bulgaria) Academic Plovdiv	—	1	
10	(Israel) Maccabi Haifa	—	1	
10	(Kosovo) Peja	—	1	
10	(Cyprus) PAYABL EKA AEL	—	1	

=== Titles by country ===
	Country	Championships	Runner-ups	Championship years
1	Bulgaria	5	5	2008–09, 2009–10, 2013–14, 2016–17, 2017–18
2	Israel	5	2	2011–12, 2012–13, 2020–21, 2021–22, 2022–23
3	Kosovo	3	2	2014–15, 2015-16, 2023–24
4	North Macedonia	2	2	2011-12, 2018-19
5	Montenegro	—	2	
6	Albania	—	1	
7	Cyprus	—	1	

== Clubs (2023-24 season) ==
Team	Arena	Capacity	Country
AEL Limassol B.C.	Nicos Solomonides Arena	2,500	Limassol, CYP
Sigal Prishtina	Pallati I Rinise Dhe Sportheve	2,800	Pristina, KOS
KK Lovćen 1947	Sportski Center Cetinje	1,500	Lovćen, MNE
KK Pljevlja	Sport Cener Ada	3,500	Pljevlja, MNE
KB Peja	Karakaci Arena	2,500	Peja, KOS
