= Gan Ner =

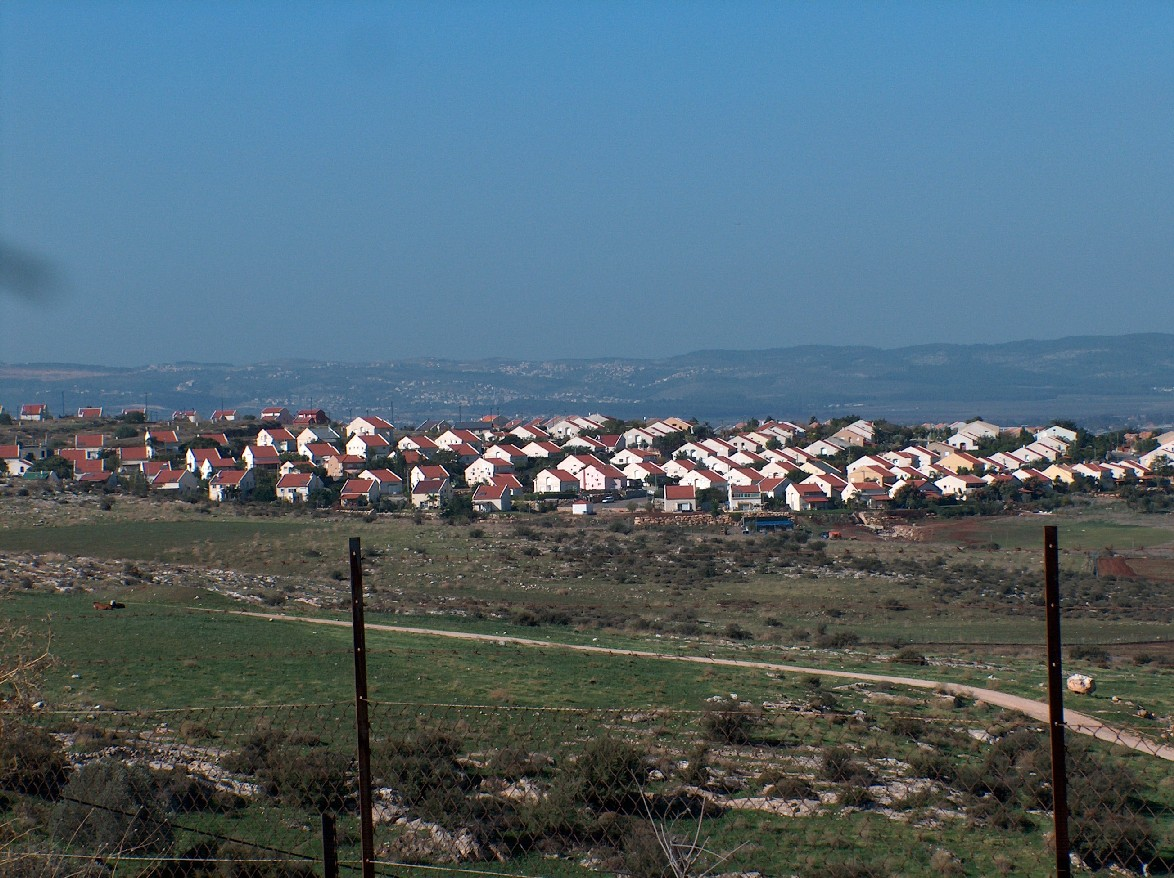

- Location within Jezreel Valley region of Israel
- Coordinates: 32°31′53″N 35°20′19″E
- Country: Israel
- District: Northern
- Subdistrict: Jezreel
- Council: Gilboa
- Founded: 1987
- Founder: Moshavniks
- Population (2024): 2,657
- Website: www.gan-ner.co.il

Gan Ner (Hebrew: גַּן נֵר) is a community settlement in northern Israel. Located near the Green Line to the south of Afula, it falls under the jurisdiction of Gilboa Regional Council. In 2024, it had a population of 2,657.

== History ==
The village was founded in 1987 by a group of families from the nearby moshavim, on the land of Al-Mazar, a former Palestinian village which had been depopulated during the 1948 Arab-Israeli War.

Gan Ner was named for Lord Barnett Janner. In 1995 a new neighborhood was constructed in the community.

Home to the Hapoel Gilboa Galil basketball club which was formed in 2008, the village has a 2,057-seat sports arena.
