= 2022–23 FIBA Europe Cup Play-offs =

Sport season

The 2022–23 FIBA Europe Cup play-offs began on 6 March and will conclude on 19 and 26 April 2023 with the 2023 FIBA Europe Cup Finals, to decide the champions of the 2022–23 FIBA Europe Cup.

== Format ==
A total of eight teams advancing from the second round (four group winners and four runners-up) will compete in the play-offs. The quarter-finals, semi-finals and the finals will be played as two-legged ties, with home and away matches. Each two-legged tie is considered as one match, meaning that if the first leg ends with a draw, no extra period is played. However, if the aggregate score of both matches is a draw, the second leg will continue to be played with as many 5-minute periods as required to break the tie.

== Bracket ==
Quarter-finals; 6–8 & 14–15 March
(Ukraine) Budivelnyk	73	79	152
(France) Cholet	72	83	155
(Estonia) Kalev/Cramo	80	85	165
(Germany) Brose Bamberg	77	67	144
(Portugal) FC Porto	80	65	145
(Finland) Karhu	81	75	156
(Poland) Anwil Włocławek	84	91	175
(Turkey) Gaziantep	85	75	160

Semi-finals; 29 March & 5 April
(France) Cholet	73	81	154
(Estonia) Kalev/Cramo	80	59	139
(Finland) Karhu	71	63	134
(Poland) Anwil Włocławek	90	67	157

Finals; 19 & 26 April
(France) Cholet	77	78	155
(Poland) Anwil Włocławek	81	80	161

== Quarter-finals ==
The first leg games were played on 6–8 March, and the second leg games were played on 14–15 March 2023. The second round group winners had the home advantage in the second leg.

Team 1	Agg.	Team 2	1st leg	2nd leg
Budivelnyk (Ukraine)	152–155	(France) Cholet	73–72	79–83
FC Porto (Portugal)	145–156	(Finland) Karhu	80–81	65–75
Anwil Włocławek (Poland)	175–160	(Turkey) Gaziantep	84–85	91–75
Kalev/Cramo (Estonia)	165–144	(Germany) Brose Bamberg	80–77	85–67

=== Cholet vs. Budivelnyk ===
7 March 2023	Budivelnyk (Ukraine)	73–72	(France) Cholet	Veroli
19:30	Scoring by quarter: 26–23, 14–27, 14–9, 19–13
	Pts: Berhanemeskel 20; Rebs: Grant 17; Asts: Berhanemeskel 6 Eff: Bliznyuk 27	Boxscore	Pts: Artis 15; Rebs: Artis, Patton 6 Asts: Campbell 6 Eff: Artis 16	Arena: Pala Coccia; Attendance: 300; Referees: Zafer Yılmaz (TUR), Petros Papapetrou (GRE), Ariadna Chueca Moreno (SPA)

14 March 2023	Cholet (France)	83–79	(Ukraine) Budivelnyk	Cholet
20:00	Scoring by quarter: 23–18, 20–20, 26–17, 14–24
	Pts: Artis 26; Rebs: Sako 8 Asts: Artis 5 Eff: Artis 27	Boxscore	Pts: Goodwin 23; Rebs: Grant 7 Asts: Bliznyuk 7 Eff: Bliznyuk 26	Arena: La Meilleraie; Attendance: 4,147; Referees: Marek Kúkelčík (SVK), Can Mavisu (TUR), Franko Gracin (CRO)

=== Karhu vs. FC Porto ===
8 March 2023	FC Porto (Portugal)	80–81	(Finland) Karhu	Porto
20:00	Scoring by quarter: 18–22, 21–14, 24–23, 17–22
	Pts: Landis 18; Rebs: Queiroz 6 Asts: Cardoso 8 Eff: Queiroz 14	Boxscore	Pts: Dolenc 16; Rebs: Crockett, Kantonen 10; Asts: Jones, Kantonen 5 Eff: Crockett 23	Arena: Dragão Arena; Attendance: 1,513; Referees: Ilias Kounelles (CYP), Alexandre Deman (FRA), Gintaras Mačiulis (LTU)

15 March 2023	Karhu (Finland)	75–65	(Portugal) FC Porto	Kauhajoki
18:30	Scoring by quarter: 24–19, 18–9, 18–20, 15–17
	Pts: Dixson 18; Rebs: Crockett 16; Asts: Jones 6 Eff: Crockett 18	Boxscore	Pts: Conklin 22; Rebs: Clark, Conklin 7 Asts: Cardoso 9 Eff: Conklin 23	Arena: IKH Areena; Attendance: 2,075; Referees: Andris Aunkrogers (LVA), Viola Györgyi (ROU), Geert Jacobs (BEL)

=== Gaziantep vs. Anwil Włocławek ===
8 March 2023	Anwil Włocławek (Poland)	84–85	(Turkey) Gaziantep	Włocławek
18:30	Scoring by quarter: 22–23, 18–26, 24–16, 20–20
	Pts: Nowakowski, Williams 19; Rebs: Williams 9 Asts: Łączyński 7 Eff: Williams 27	Boxscore	Pts: Dotson 27; Rebs: Egbunu 7 Asts: Hanlan 6 Eff: Dotson 26	Arena: Hala Mistrzów; Attendance: 2,500; Referees: Igor Mitrovski (MKD), Vladimir Jevtović (SRB), Mihkel Männiste (FRA)

15 March 2023	Gaziantep (Turkey)	75–91	(Poland) Anwil Włocławek	Istanbul
20:00	Scoring by quarter: 14–18, 19–25, 18–23, 24–25
	Pts: Miller-McIntyre 29; Rebs: Hammonds, Miller-McIntyre 6 Asts: Miller-McIntyre 5 Eff: Miller-McIntyre 34	Boxscore	Pts: Sanders 19; Rebs: Sobin 7 Asts: Greene 5 Eff: Sanders 20	Arena: Ahmet Cömert Sport Hall; Attendance: 1,500; Referees: Carsten Straube (GER), Martin Vulić (CRO), Sinisa Prpa (SRB)

=== Brose Bamberg vs. Kalev/Cramo ===
6 March 2023	Kalev/Cramo (Estonia)	80–77	(Germany) Brose Bamberg	Tallinn
18:30	Scoring by quarter: 19–24, 22–23, 20–10, 19–20
	Pts: Konontšuk 22; Rebs: Konontšuk 10; Asts: Gilbert, Van Beck 3 Eff: Konontšuk 29	Boxscore	Pts: Miller 15; Rebs: Sengfelder 9 Asts: Chachashvili 3 Eff: Bohacik, Sengfelder 15	Arena: Kalevi Spordihall; Attendance: 1,686; Referees: Dariusz Zapolski (POL), Gintaras Vitkauskas (LTU), Ventsislav Velikov (BUL)

15 March 2023	Brose Bamberg (Germany)	67–85	(Estonia) Kalev/Cramo	Bamberg
20:00	Scoring by quarter: 24–27, 19–24, 10–17, 14–17
	Pts: Simmons 24; Rebs: Young 7 Asts: Miller 4 Eff: Simmons 11	Boxscore	Pts: Konontšuk, Van Beck 17; Rebs: Konontšuk, Meiers 8 Asts: Gilbert 4 Eff: Konontšuk 20	Arena: Brose Arena; Attendance: 3,172; Referees: Oskars Lucis (LVA), Blaž Zupančič (SVN), Anastasios Kardaris (GRE)

== Semi-finals ==
The first leg matches played on 29 March 2022, and the second leg matches played on 5 April 2023.

Team 1	Agg.	Team 2	1st leg	2nd leg
Kalev/Cramo (Estonia)	139–154	(France) Cholet	80–73	59–81
Anwil Włocławek (Poland)	157–134	(Finland) Karhu	90–71	67–63

=== Cholet vs. Kalev/Cramo ===
29 March 2023	Kalev/Cramo (Estonia)	80–73	(France) Cholet Basket	Tallinn
19:30	Scoring by quarter: 17–14, 18–17:, 22–24, 23–18
	Pts: Van Beck 19; Rebs: Konontšuk 8 Asts: Gilbert 6 Eff: Van Beck 19	Boxscore	Pts: Artis 26; Rebs: Patton 7 Asts: Artis 3 Eff: Artis 25	Arena: Tondiraba Ice Hall; Attendance: 5,422; Referees: Mārtiņš Kozlovskis (LVA), Yener Yılmaz (TUR), Beniamino Attard (ITA)

5 April 2023	Cholet Basket (France)	81–59	(Estonia) Kalev/Cramo	Cholet
20:00	Scoring by quarter: 20–11, 17–11, 27–19, 17–18
	Pts: Artis 20; Rebs: Dallo 11; Asts: Dallo 6 Eff: Artis 17	Boxscore	Pts: Van Beck 18; Rebs: Hermet, Van Beck 4 Asts: Gilbert 4 Eff: Van Beck 18	Arena: La Meilleraie; Attendance: 4,800; Referees: Fernando Calatrava (SPA), Andris Aunkrogers (LVA), Martin Vulić (CRO)

=== Karhu vs. Anwil Włocławek ===
29 March 2023	Anwil Włocławek (Poland)	90–71	(Finland) Karhu	Włocławek
18:30	Scoring by quarter: 24–17, 19–20, 27–13, 20–21
	Pts: Sanders 19; Rebs: Sobin 8 Asts: Moore 5 Eff: Sanders 17	Boxscore	Pts: Jones 16; Rebs: Crockett 8 Asts: Kaukiainen 4 Eff: Crockett 21	Arena: Hala Mistrzów; Attendance: 3,105; Referees: Martin Horozov (BUL), Kerem Baki (TUR), Franko Gracin (CRO)

5 April 2023	Karhu (Finland)	63–67	(Poland) Anwil Włocławek	Kauhajoki
18:30	Scoring by quarter: 17–17, 18–14, 11–19, 17–17
	Pts: Dixson 16; Rebs: Crockett 7 Asts: Jones, Kantonen 3 Eff: Dixson 16	Boxscore	Pts: Greene 17; Rebs: Williams 10; Asts: Moore 7 Eff: Greene 15	Arena: IKH Areena; Attendance: 1,684; Referees: Oskars Lucis (LVA), Zdenko Tomašovič (SVK), Péter Praksch (HUN)

== Finals ==
The first leg will be played on 19 April, and the second leg will be played on 26 April 2023.

Team 1	Agg.	Team 2	1st leg	2nd leg
Anwil Włocławek (Poland)	161–155	(France) Cholet	81–77	80–78

19 April 2023	Anwil Włocławek (Poland)	81–77	(France) Cholet	Włocławek
	Scoring by quarter: 28–22, 21–31, 15–12, 17–12
	Pts: Greene 20; Rebs: Williams 9 Asts: Łączyński 10; Eff: Greene 20	Boxscore	Pts: Artis 19; Rebs: Dallo 8 Asts: Campbell 9 Eff: Dallo 21	Arena: Hala Mistrzów; Attendance: 3,963; Referees: Paulo Marques (POR), Lorenzo Baldini (ITA), Gvidas Gedvilas (LTU)

26 April 2023	Cholet (France)	78–80	(Poland) Anwil Włocławek	Cholet
	Scoring by quarter: 18–20, 24–17, 15–21, 21–22
	Pts: Artis 23; Rebs: Ellis 13; Asts: Dallo 6 Eff: Ellis 25	Boxscore	Pts: Sanders 20; Rebs: Williams 9 Asts: Łączyński 5 Eff: Williams 21	Arena: La Meilleraie; Attendance: 4,889; Referees: Boris Krejic (SVN), Luis Castillo (SPA), Kerem Baki (TUR)
