= 2023 FIBA Europe Cup Finals =

Finals of the 2022–23 edition of the FIBA Europe Cup

- The official poster for Game 1 of the 2023 Finals
- Event: 2022–23 FIBA Europe Cup
Cholet	Anwil Włocławek
(France)	(Poland)
155	161

First leg
Cholet	Anwil Włocławek
77	81
- Date: 19 April 2023
- Venue: Hala Mistrzów, Włocławek
- MVP: Phil Greene IV
- Referees: Paulo Marques (POR), Lorenzo Baldini (ITA), Gvidas Gedvilas (LTU)
- Attendance: 3,963

Second leg
Anwil Włocławek	Cholet
80	78
- Date: 26 April 2023
- Venue: La Meilleraie, Cholet
- Referees: Boris Krejic (SVN), Luis Castillo (SPA), Kerem Baki (TUR)
- Attendance: 4,889

The 2023 FIBA Europe Cup Finals were the concluding games of the 2022–23 FIBA Europe Cup season. The Finals were played in a two-legged format, with the first leg being played on April 19 and the second one on 26 April 2023. The finals were played between Cholet and Anwil Włocławek. Both teams were appear in their first FIBA Europe Cup final.

Anwil Włocławek won its first European championship after defeating Cholet in both legs. Phil Greene IV won the league's Finals MVP award.

== Venues ==
Włocławek	2023 FIBA Europe Cup Finals (Europe)	Cholet
Hala Mistrzów	2023 FIBA Europe Cup Finals (Europe)	La Meilleraie
Capacity: 4,200	2023 FIBA Europe Cup Finals (Europe)	Capacity: 5,191

== Road to the Finals ==
Note: In the table, the score of the finalist is given first (H = home; A = away).

(France) Cholet				Round	(Poland) Anwil Włocławek			
Group E: Pos / Team / Pld / Pts; 1 / (Romania) CSM Oradea / 6 / 11; 2 / (France) Cholet / 6 / 10; 3 / (Belgium) Kangoeroes Mechelen / 6 / 9; 4 / (Bulgaria) Rilski Sportist / 6 / 6; Source: Groups Standings				Regular season	Group G: Pos / Team / Pld / Pts; 1 / (Finland) Karhu / 6 / 11; 2 / (Poland) Anwil Włocławek / 6 / 10; 3 / (Portugal) Sporting CP / 6 / 9; 4 / (Hungary) Körmend / 6 / 6; Source: Groups Standings			
Group I: Pos / Team / Pld / Pts; 1 / (France) Cholet / 6 / 11; 2 / (Portugal) FC Porto / 6 / 10; 3 / (Germany) Niners Chemnitz / 6 / 9; 4 / (Romania) SCMU Craiova / 6 / 6; Source: Second Round Standings				Second round	Group L: Pos / Team / Pld / Pts; 1 / (Germany) Brose Bamberg / 6 / 10; 2 / (Poland) Anwil Włocławek / 6 / 10; 3 / (Romania) CSM Oradea / 6 / 9; 4 / (Cyprus) Keravnos / 6 / 7; Source: Second Round Standings			
Opponent	Agg.	1st leg	2nd leg	Play-offs	Opponent	Agg.	1st leg	2nd leg
(Ukraine) Budivelnyk	155–152	72–73 (A)	83–79 (H)	Quarterfinals	(Turkey) Gaziantep	154–139	84–85 (H)	91–75 (A)
(Estonia) Kalev/Cramo	154–139	73–80 (A)	81–59 (H)	Semifinals	(Finland) Karhu	157–134	90–71 (H)	67–63 (A)

== First leg ==
19 April 2023	Anwil Włocławek (Poland)	81–77	(France) Cholet	Włocławek
19:00	Scoring by quarter: 28–22, 21–31, 15–12, 17–12
	Pts: Greene 20; Rebs: Williams 9 Asts: Łączyński 10; Eff: Greene 20	Boxscore	Pts: Artis 19; Rebs: Dallo 8 Asts: Campbell 9 Eff: Dallo 21	Arena: Hala Mistrzów; Attendance: 3,963; Referees: Paulo Marques (POR), Lorenzo Baldini (ITA), Gvidas Gedvilas (LTU)

Starters:			Pts	Reb	Ast
PG	1	(United States) Phil Greene IV	20	3	3
PG	9	(Poland) Kamil Łączyński	2	0	10
PF	18	(United States) Luke Petrasek	7	3	4
PF	25	(Poland) Michał Nowakowski	7	0	0
C	12	(United States) Malik Williams	12	9	1
Reserves:					
SG	2	(United States) Lee Moore	8	6	2
SG	6	(United States) Victor Sanders	16	2	1
C	8	(Croatia) Josip Sobin	9	3	3
PG	11	(Poland) Bartosz Łazarski	DNP		
C	16	(Poland) Dawid Słupiński	0	0	0
SF	21	(Poland) Maciej Bojanowski	0	0	0
SG	77	(Poland) Marcin Woroniecki	DNP		
Head coach:
(Polish Basketball Federation) Przemysław Frasunkiewicz

Anwil Włocławek	Cholet

Włocławek	Statistics	Cholet
17/33 (51%)	2-pt field goals	28/59 (47%)
13/29 (45%)	3-pt field goals	20/32 (62%)
8/11 (73%)	Free throws	13/15 (87%)
6	Offensive rebounds	7
23	Defensive rebounds	27
29	Total rebounds	34
24	Assists	17
11	Turnovers	12
5	Steals	4
2	Blocks	4
18	Fouls	16

Starters:			Pts	Reb	Ast
G	12	(France) Boris Dallo	17	8	3
PG	6	(United States) Dominic Artis	19	4	4
PG	44	(United States) Terrance Campbell	10	3	9
PF	34	(United States) Perry Ellis	8	3	0
C	24	(United States) Justin Patton	7	3	1
Reserves:					
SF	0	(France) Lucas Dufeal	DNP		
SG	8	(France) Hugo Robineau	2	2	0
C	13	(France) Neal Sako	14	7	0
PG	20	(France) Mathéo Leray	0	0	0
PG	26	(France) Enzo Goudou-Sinha	0	0	0
SG	70	(France) Matéo Bordes	DNP		
Head coach:
(French Federation of Basketball) Laurent Vila

- Team captains (C): (Poland) Kamil Łączyński (Anwil Włocławek) and (France) Boris Dallo (Cholet)

== Second leg ==
26 April 2023	Cholet (France)	78–80	(Poland) Anwil Włocławek	Cholet
20:00	Scoring by quarter: 18–20, 24–17, 15–21, 21–22
	Pts: Artis 23; Rebs: Ellis 13; Asts: Dallo 6 Eff: Ellis 25	Boxscore	Pts: Sanders 20; Rebs: Williams 9 Asts: Łączyński 5 Eff: Williams 21	Arena: La Meilleraie; Attendance: 4,889; Referees: Boris Krejic (SVN), Luis Castillo (SPA), Kerem Baki (TUR)

Starters:			Pts	Reb	Ast
G	12	(France) Boris Dallo	9	10	6
PG	6	(United States) Dominic Artis	23	1	3
PG	44	(United States) Terrance Campbell	11	3	1
PF	34	(United States) Perry Ellis	17	13	1
C	13	(France) Neal Sako	10	9	1
Reserves:					
SF	0	(France) Lucas Dufeal	0	0	0
C	2	(France) Naoll Balfourier	0	0	0
SG	8	(France) Hugo Robineau	2	0	0
PG	20	(France) Mathéo Leray	DNP		
PG	26	(France) Enzo Goudou-Sinha	6	1	2
SG	70	(France) Matéo Bordes	DNP		
Head coach:
(French Federation of Basketball) Laurent Vila

Cholet	Anwil Włocławek

Cholet	Statistics	Włocławek
22/29 (76%)	2-pt field goals	16/39 (44%)
7/33 (21%)	3-pt field goals	13/29 (45%)
13/19 (68%)	Free throws	9/13 (69%)
15	Offensive rebounds	16
25	Defensive rebounds	21
40	Total rebounds	37
14	Assists	19
18	Turnovers	13
11	Steals	11
3	Blocks	0
20	Fouls	21

Starters:			Pts	Reb	Ast
PG	1	(United States) Phil Greene IV	11	2	4
PG	9	(Poland) Kamil Łączyński	4	3	5
SG	2	(United States) Lee Moore	10	7	3
PF	18	(United States) Luke Petrasek	7	4	1
C	12	(United States) Malik Williams	20	3	2
Reserves:					
SG	6	(United States) Victor Sanders	20	3	2
PF	7	(Poland) Daniel Dawdo	DNP		
C	8	(Croatia) Josip Sobin	8	3	2
C	16	(Poland) Dawid Słupiński	0	0	0
SF	21	(Poland) Maciej Bojanowski	0	1	0
PF	25	(Poland) Michał Nowakowski	4	1	0
SG	77	(Poland) Marcin Woroniecki	DNP		
Head coach:
(Polish Basketball Federation) Przemysław Frasunkiewicz

- Team captains (C): (France) Boris Dallo (Cholet) and (Poland) Kamil Łączyński (Anwil Włocławek)

== See also ==
- 2023 EuroLeague Final Four
- 2023 EuroCup Final
- 2023 Basketball Champions League Final Four
