= KB Peja =

Professional basketball club in Kosovo

Peja
- Leagues: Kosovo Superleague
- Founded: 13 May 1993; 33 years ago
- History: KB Peja (1993–2001); KB Dukagjini Pejë (2001–2005); KB Peja (2005–present)
- Arena: Karagaq Sports Hall
- Capacity: 2,500
- Location: Pejë, Kosovo
- Team colors: Yellow and black
- President: Fatmir Gashi
- Head coach: Boško Radović
- Team captain: Arti Hajdari
- Championships: 6 Kosovo Superleague; 6 Kosovo Cup; 2 Kosovo Supercup; 1 Liga Unike
- Website: kbpeja.com
Home	Away

Klubi i Basketbollit Peja (English: Basketball Club Peja) is a Kosovan professional basketball club based in Pejë. The club competes in the Kosovo Basketball Superleague, Kosovo Cup and Liga Unike.

The team's roster has included big names like Acie Earl, Fred House, Ricardo Marsh, Samir Shaptahu, Dardan Berisha, Ersid Luca, Drilon Hajrizi and Gerti Shima.

== History ==
The team was officially formed on 13 March 1993 under the ownership of Ilhami Gashi. The club's first manager was Valdet Spahija and the first roster consisted of Valdet Spahija (as player-manager), Riza Gjakova, Ahmet Nimani, Besim Gjuka, Sebajdin Sylejmani, Agim Lluka, Agim Beqiraj and Turhan Zajmi.

The team name was KB Peja until 2001, when Ekrem Lluka bought the club and renamed it KB Dukagjini(Dukagjini is the company named after the region). In 2005 the name was changed back to KB Peja. In the 1996–97 season KB Peja played in the second division, due to problems with the Basketball Federation of Kosovo. In 2003–04, the team didn't compete in any league organized by the Basketball Federation of Kosovo.

In the 2016–17 season, Peja would play in a European competition for the first time, when the team entered the FIBA Europe Cup.

== Honours and titles ==
=== Domestic ===
- Kosovo Superleague
  - Winners (6): 1994, 1995, 1996, 2004, 2013, 2023
  - Runners-up (9): 1993, 2000, 2005, 2008, 2011, 2014, 2015, 2016, 2021
- Kosovo Cup
  - Winners (6): 1994, 1995, 1997, 2011, 2015, 2020
  - Runners-up (7): 2001, 2006, 2008, 2009, 2013, 2016, 2017
- Kosovo Supercup
  - Winners (2): 1997, 2015

=== Regional ===
- Balkan League
  - Runners-up (1): 2023
  - Semi-finalist (3): 2015, 2017, 2024
- Liga Unike
  - Winners (1): 2022
  - Runners-up (1): 2021

== Players ==
=== Current roster ===
Note: Flags indicate national team eligibility at FIBA-sanctioned events. Players may hold other non-FIBA nationalities not displayed.

KB Peja roster
Players
Coaches

Pos.	No.	Nat.	Name	Ht.	Age
SG	1	(Kosovo)	Hajdari, Arti	1.87 m (6 ft 2 in)	33 – 12 May 1993
PG	2	(Kosovo)	Hasanaj, Elon	1.82 m (6 ft 0 in)	19 – 21 September 2007
SG	3	(United States)	Ricks Jr., Gary	1.85 m (6 ft 1 in)	34 – 14 November 1991
F/C	4	(United States)	Wilson III, Dwight	2.05 m (6 ft 9 in)	28 – 8 October 1998
SG	5	(Kosovo)	Shatri, Orges	1.98 m (6 ft 6 in)	21 – 24 May 2005
G	7	(United States)	Artis, Dominic	1.90 m (6 ft 3 in)	33 – 7 July 1993
F	9	(Kosovo)	Llapi, Shendrit	2.01 m (6 ft 7 in)	24 – 17 October 2002
F	10	(Kosovo)	Vokshi, Elod	2.00 m (6 ft 7 in)	16 – 21 May 2010
PF	11	(United States)	Johnson, Xavier	2.03 m (6 ft 8 in)	33 – 8 June 1993
PF	12	(Kosovo)	Haxhosaj, Dion	2.03 m (6 ft 8 in)	28 – 7 September 1998
G/F	13	(Albania) (Kosovo)	Lekndreaj, Daniel	1.92 m (6 ft 4 in)	28 – 16 November 1997
PG	22	(Kosovo)	Morina, Altin	1.95 m (6 ft 5 in)	34 – 19 June 1992
G	30	(Kosovo)	Ahmeti, Andi	1.90 m (6 ft 3 in)	20 – 5 April 2006
PF	37	(Kosovo) (North Macedonia)	Zeqiri, Jetmir	2.03 m (6 ft 8 in)	30 – 18 August 1996
PG	55	(United States)	Bracey, DaQuan	1.80 m (5 ft 11 in)	29 – 13 May 1997

Head coach

- (Montenegro) Boško Radović

Assistant coach(es)

- (Israel) Diego García
- (Kosovo) Molos Serqa

Legend

- (C) Team captain
- (TW) Two-way affiliate player
- Injured

- Roster
Updated: 26 October 2026

=== Depth chart ===
Pos.	Starting 5	Bench 1	Bench 2
C	Dwight Wilson III	Dion Haxhosaj	Shendrit Llapi
PF	Xavier Johnson	Jetmir Zeqiri	Elod Vokshi
SF	Daniel Lekndreaj	Dominic Artis	Andi Ahmeti
SG	Arti Hajdari	Gary Ricks Jr.	Orges Shatri
PG	DaQuan Bracey	Altin Morina	Elon Hasanaj

=== Notable players ===
Note: Flags indicate national team eligibility at FIBA-sanctioned events. Players may hold other non-FIBA nationalities not displayed.

Criteria

To appear in this section a player must have either:

- Set a club record or won an individual award while at the club
- Played at least one official international match for their national team at any time
- Played at least one official NBA match at any time.

Kosovo and Albania

- (Kosovo) Dardan Berisha
- (Kosovo) Edis Kuraja
- (Kosovo) (Albania) Ersid Luca
- (Albania) Gerti Shima
- (Kosovo) (United States) Malcolm Armstead
- (Kosovo) Samir Shaptahu
- (Kosovo) Valdet Grapci
- (Kosovo) Valdet Spahija
- (Kosovo) Arti Hajdari
- (Kosovo) Lis Shoshi

Balkans

- (Bosnia and Herzegovina) Adnan Bajramović
- (Slovenia) Dragan Pusić
- (Croatia) Goran Kalamiža
- (Croatia) Hrvoje Puljko
- (Slovenia) Jan Močnik
- (Croatia) (Bosnia and Herzegovina) Jozo Brkić
- (Bosnia and Herzegovina) Mirza Ahmetbašić
- (Bosnia and Herzegovina) Nedžad Spahić
- (Croatia) Teo Simović

United States

- (United States) Acie Earl
- (United States) Anthony Knox
- (United States) Cyril Awere
- (United States) Dustin Scott
- (United States) Fred House
- (United States) George Odufuwa
- (United States) Janou Rubin
- (United States) Mario Austin
- (United States) Mario Edwards
- (United States) Nic Wise
- (United States) Ricardo Marsh
- (United States) Theo Little
- (United States) Jalen Tate

Other countries

- (Dominican Republic) Carlos Morban
- (Canada) Harouna Mutombo
- (Canada) Devoe Joseph

== Coaching history ==
- 2002–2004 (Albania) Bujar Shehu
- (Kosovo) Valdet Spahija
- 2006/07 (Slovenia) Robert Matijević
- 2007 - 2011 (Kosovo) Bujar Loci
- 2011/12 (Croatia) Ivica Marić
- 2012/13 (Croatia) Rudolf Jugo
- 2013/14 (Croatia) Danijel Lutz
- 2013/14 (Montenegro) Boban Savović
- 2014/15 (Croatia) Borislav Kurtović
- 2015–2016 (Croatia) Branimir Pavić
- 2016–2017 (North Macedonia) Aleksandar Todorov
- 2019–2020 (Croatia) Jeronimo Šarin
- 2020 (Bosnia and Herzegovina) Adis Bećiragić
- 2020 (Turkey) Şemsettin Baş
- 2021 (Croatia) Edi Dželalija
- 2021 (North Macedonia) Jordančo Davitkov
- 2021 (Croatia) Dragan Radović
- 2021-2022 (Turkey) Şemsettin Baş
- 2022–2022 (North Macedonia) Marin Dokuzovski
- 2022–2023 (Turkey) Can Sevim
- 2023–2024 (Israel) Rami Hadar
