= Eyabi Okie =

American football player (born 1999)

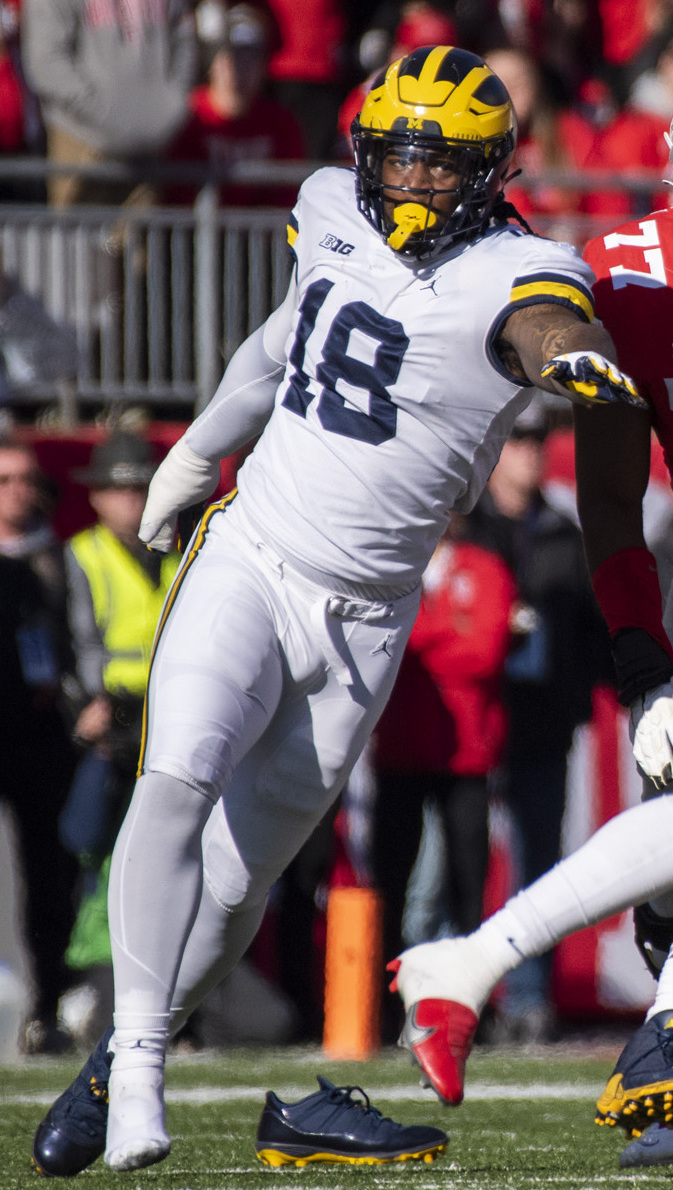
- Okie with the Michigan Wolverines in 2022

No. 47 – Colorado Stampede
- Position: Defensive end
- Roster status: Active

Personal information
- Born: June 7, 1999 (age 27); Baltimore, Maryland, U.S.
- Listed height: 6 ft 4 in (1.93 m)
- Listed weight: 251 lb (114 kg)

Career information
- High school: St. Frances Academy (MD)
- College: Alabama (2018); Houston (2019–2020); UT Martin (2021); Michigan (2022); Charlotte (2023)
- NFL draft: 2024: undrafted

Career history
- Edmonton Elks (2024)*; Houston Roughnecks (2025); Fishers Freight (2025); Dallas Renegades (2026); Colorado Stampede (2027–present)
- * Offseason or practice squad member only

Awards and highlights
- Second-team All-AAC (2023)

Eyabi Okie (born June 7, 1999), formerly known as Eyabi Anoma, is an American football defensive end for the Colorado Stampede of the United Football League (UFL). He played college football for Alabama, UT Martin, and Michigan. He was also one of the highest rated recruits in the 2018 college football recruiting class, ranked No. 3 nationally by USA Today and No. 4 by 247Sports.

== Early life ==
Okie attended Saint Frances Academy in Baltimore. He was selected by The Baltimore Sun as its Defensive Player of the Year in December 2017. He was also one of the highest rated recruits in the 2018 college football recruiting class, ranked No. 3 nationally by USA Today, No. 4 by 247Sports, and No. 7 by Rivals.com.

== College career ==
=== Alabama ===
Okie committed to Alabama in December 2017. He starred at the Under Armour All-America Game, tallying two sacks. He played at the linebacker position for Alabama in 2018 and received SEC All-Freshmen honors at the end of the season. In July 2019, Alabama newspapers reported that Okie was not attending classes, jeopardizing his ability to participate in the team's preseason training camp. In August, head coach Nick Saban announced that Okie had been dismissed from the university but refused to elaborate further on the reason for the dismissal.

=== Houston ===
During the 2020 season, Okie redshirted for Houston. He was unable to play due to NCAA transfer rules. He was dismissed from the Houston program due to "off-field problems."

=== UT Martin ===
Okie then joined UT Martin in 2021. After tallying eight tackles, 4.5 tackles for loss, and 1.5 sacks and blocking a potential game-winning field goal attempt against Austin Peay, he received multiple honors as the Ohio Valley Conference (OVC) Defensive Player of the Week and Newcomer of the Week, and FCS National Defensive Player of the Week. He helped lead the 2021 UT Martin Skyhawks football team to the OVC championship and the second round of the NCAA Division I FCS playoffs. At the end of the season, he was selected to the OVC All-Newcomer team at the outside linebacker position. He received a degree in interdisciplinary studies from UT Martin.

=== Michigan ===
In August 2022, Okie transferred to Michigan, enrolling as a graduate student at the university's School of Social Work.

After the death of his grandmother early in the summer of 2022, Okie rededicated himself and was inspired to transfer to Michigan. Early in the 2022 season, he changed his surname from "Anoma" to "Okie", intending to recognize his mother who lives in Africa.

== Professional career ==
Pre-draft measurables
Height	Weight	Arm length	Hand span	Wingspan
6 ft 4 1/2 in (1.94 m)	260 lb (118 kg)	33 1/2 in (0.85 m)	9 1/2 in (0.24 m)	6 ft 7 3/8 in (2.02 m)
All values from NFL Combine

=== Edmonton Elks ===
After going undrafted in the 2024 NFL draft, Okie signed with the Edmonton Elks of the Canadian Football League on May 16, 2024. He was released on May 22, 2024.

=== Houston Roughnecks ===
On July 17, 2024, Okie was selected by the Houston Roughnecks with the second overall selection in the 2024 UFL draft. He was signed on July 23. He played in the 2025 season opener, and was then released on April 1, 2025.

=== Fishers Freight ===
On May 14, 2025, Okie signed to play for the Fishers Freight of the Indoor Football League (IFL).

=== Dallas Renegades ===
On March 16, 2026, Okie signed with the Dallas Renegades of the United Football League (UFL).
