= Saint Frances Academy (Baltimore) =

Historically Black Catholic school in Maryland, USA

Location
- 501 East Chase Street; Baltimore, Maryland 21202; United States; 39°18′8″N 76°36′30″W

Information
- Type: Private
- Motto: Providentia Providebit (Providence will provide)
- Religious affiliations: Roman Catholic (Oblate Sisters of Providence)
- Denomination: Catholic
- Established: 1828; 198 years ago
- Founder: Mother Mary Lange, OSP
- Oversight: Oblate Sisters of Providence
- CEEB code: 210185
- Head of school: Deacon Curtis Turner, Ed.D.
- Teaching staff: 14
- Grades: 6–12
- Gender: Coeducational
- Average class size: 18
- Student to teacher ratio: 15:1
- Campus size: 2.96 acres (1.20 ha)
- Campus type: Urban
- Colors: Blue & White; Athletics: Black & Gold
- Slogan: "We can. We will. We must."
- Athletics: MIAA, IAAM
- Mascot: Panthers
- Nickname: SFA
- Team name: Panthers
- Rival: Everybody
- Accreditation: Middle States Association of Colleges and Schools
- Yearbook: The Counsellor
- School fees: $0
- Tuition: $12,400 (2024–25)
- Affiliation: Catholic school
- NCEA School ID: 1026047
- Website: www.sfacademy.org

Saint Frances Academy is an independent Catholic middle and high school in Baltimore, Maryland. Founded in 1828 to educate African American children, it is the first and oldest continually operating Black Catholic school in the United States.

== History ==
=== Early years ===
On June 13, 1828, the Oblate School for Colored Girls was founded by Mary Elizabeth Lange at 5 St. Mary's Court in Baltimore's Seton Hill neighborhood, northwest of downtown, near St. Mary's Seminary and College. The seminary was then located on North Paca Street; founded in 1791, it was the first Catholic seminary in the United States. It was established with the mission to teach "children of color to read the Bible".

The following year in 1829, the school operated from 610 George Street and then 48 Richmond Street (now West Read Street), a few blocks away. In 1832 the school graduated its first class with ceremonies.

By 1853, the school changed its name from the Oblate School for Colored Girls to the Saint Frances School for Colored Girls, named after St. Frances of Rome (1384–1440). The title was later shortened to the Saint Frances Academy.

In 1871, the school moved to its current location in inner East Baltimore at 501 East Chase Street. This is now within the Johnston Square neighborhood.

=== Modern era ===
In the 20th century, the school focused on higher grades. It started admitting boys in June 1974, when it became part of a Catholic school cluster known as Saint Frances-Charles Hall High School. The school returned to independent status in 1991. It offers a traditional, co-educational, college-preparatory curriculum for students in grades nine through twelve.

An honors program is available to select students. All students complete a community service component. Independently owned and operated by the Oblates, the school is approved by the Maryland State Department of Education and is accredited by the Commission on Secondary Schools of the regional agency of the Middle States Association of Colleges and Schools.

The student population is still predominantly African-American.

==== Bill and Camille Cosby donations ====
In 2012, Camille Cosby, an alumna of a school in Washington run by the Oblates, and her husband Bill Cosby made a donation to assist St. Frances Academy in building a community center in East Baltimore. The community center was originally named after both her and her husband, but his name was removed after the revelation of multiple sexual offenses by him.

== Athletics ==
=== Football ===
The football program was founded in 2008, with one initial $60,000 contribution coming from Gilman School coach Biff Poggi.

In the late 2010s, St. Frances' football program became the subject of controversy in Maryland. After Poggi took over as head coach in 2017, he began aggressively recruiting talented players from inside and outside Maryland, to a greater degree than other private schools in the state. Within a few seasons, St. Frances became effectively unbeatable by their traditional opponents in the Maryland Interscholastic Athletic Association (MIAA) (which they won in 2016 and 2017), regularly defeating them by wide margins.

Before 2018 those teams told St. Frances they would no longer play them, citing safety concerns as many of St. Frances' recruits were well outside the typical height and weight range for high school players and more in line with college football teams. Some St. Frances supporters believe the opponents' real motives were racial, since there had been no complaints when predominantly white teams such as Gilman had been similarly successful in earlier seasons. The team won the MIAA championship before the season even started, as those opponents who refused to play had to forfeit their games. The school scheduled intrasquad scrimmages, opponents from as far away as Canada, and road trips to the South for the players' benefit.

Poggi departed the program in July 2021. The St. Frances team continued its winning ways, finishing the following season in the top 5 of MaxPreps' 10 national rankings.

=== Basketball ===
- Men's Basketball (MIAA A Conference Championships): 2008–09, 2009–10, 2012–13, 2015–16, 2018–19.
- Women's Basketball (IAAM A Conference Championships): 2000–01, 2001–02, 2002–03, 2003–04, 2004–05, 2005–06, 2006–07, 2007–08, 2009–10, 2015–16, 2016–17, 2017–18, 2018–19, 2019-20

== Notable alumni ==
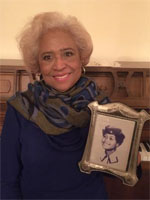
Dr. Sandra Williams Ortega

- Billie Holiday (c/o 1920), jazz singer and songwriter
- Sandra Williams Ortega, (c/o 1953), PhD and U.S. Air Force officer
- Devin Gray (c/o 1991), basketball player
- Mark Karcher (c/o 1997), basketball player
- Angel McCoughtry (c/o 2004), basketball player
- Sean Mosley (c/o 2008), basketball player
- DaQuan Bracey (c/o 2016), basketball player
- Gary Brightwell (c/o 2017), football player
- Jaelyn Duncan (c/o 2017), football player
- Kingsley Jonathan (c/o 2017), football player
- Nia Clouden (c/o 2018), basketball player
- Eyabi Okie (c/o 2018), football player
- Darrian Dalcourt (c/o 2019), football player
- Shane Lee (c/o 2019), football player
- Ace Baldwin Jr. (c/o 2020), basketball player
- Jahmal Banks (c/o 2020), football player
- Chris Braswell (c/o 2020), football player
- Blake Corum (c/o 2020), football player
- Nikhai Hill-Green (c/o 2020), football player
- Traeshon Holden (c/o 2020 - transferred), football player
- Jeffrey M'Ba (c/o 2020), football player
- Angel Reese, (c/o 2020), basketball player, WNBA All-Star
- Jamon Dumas-Johnson (c/o 2021), football player
- Julian Reese (c/o 2021), basketball player
- Jaishawn Barham (c/o 2022), football player
- Jude Bowry (c/o 2022), football player
- Derrick Moore (c/o 2022), football player for the Detroit Lions
- Elijah Sarratt (c/o 2022), football player
- Bub Carrington (c/o 2023), basketball player
- Ify Obidegwu (c/o 2024), football player
- Michael Van Buren Jr. (c/o 2024), football player
- DeJuan Williams (c/o 2024), football player

== See also ==
- Mother Mary Lange, Foundress of Saint Frances Academy
- National Catholic Educational Association
- Oblate Sisters of Providence
