= Sean Mosley =

American basketball player

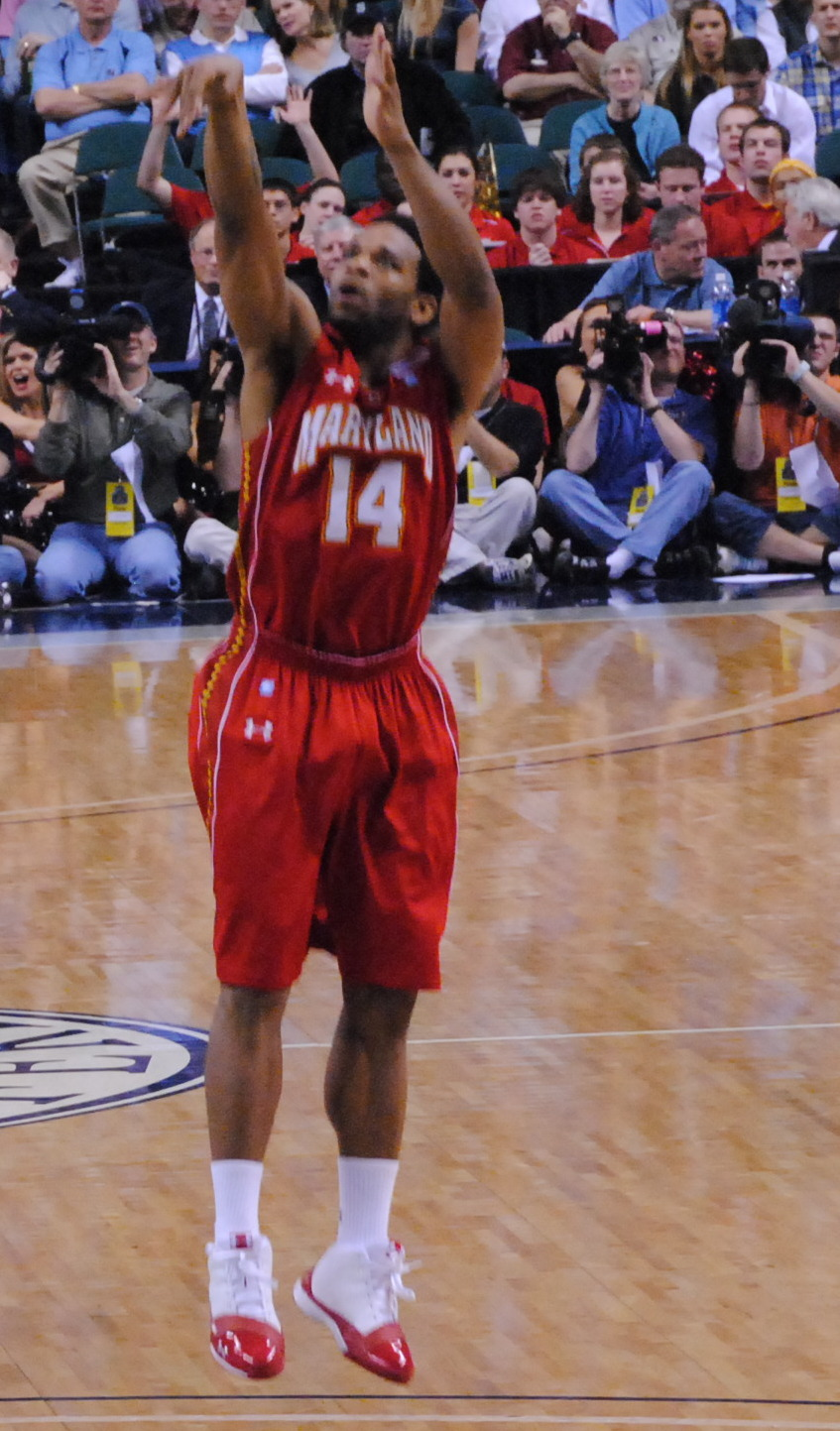
- Mosley shooting for Maryland

Free agent
- Position: Shooting guard

Personal information
- Born: March 19, 1989 (age 37) Baltimore, Maryland
- Listed height: 6 ft 4 in (1.93 m)
- Listed weight: 210 lb (95 kg)

Career information
- High school: St. Frances Academy (Baltimore, Maryland)
- College: Maryland (2008–2012)
- NBA draft: 2012: undrafted
- Playing career: 2012–present

Career history
- 2012–2013: SKK Kotwica Kołobrzeg
- 2014–2015: Crailsheim Merlins
- 2015: Hapoel Tel Aviv B.C.

Sean Mosley (born March 19, 1989) is an American professional basketball player who last played for Hapoel Tel Aviv B.C. of the Israeli Basketball Premier League.

== High school career ==
While in high school Sean was named Player of the Year by the Baltimore Sun at St. Frances Academy. Sean was also named the 2008 Gatorade Player of the Year in Maryland where he finished his career as the second-leading scorer in Maryland high school basketball with 2,933 points. In his senior season he helped his team win the Baltimore Catholic League championship.

== College career ==
Sean Mosley played his entire college career (2008–2012) for the University of Maryland. Sean was team captain during his junior and senior seasons. As a member of the team Sean was in the top 5 in the ACC in 3-point field goal percentage (37%) and free throw percentage (84%). In his senior year he was second in scoring. During his sophomore year he was ranked 4th on the team in scoring and 2nd on the team in rebounding.

== Professional career ==
Mosley entered the 2012 NBA Draft but was not selected. On October 23, 2014 he signed with the Crailsheim Merlinsin the German Basketball League after playing for SKK Kotwica Kołobrzeg of the Polish Basketball League. On August 6, 2015 he signed to Hapoel Tel Aviv for the 2015–16 season after competing for Crailsheim Merlins for the 2014–15 season.
