= Jetmir Zeqiri =

Macedonian-Kosovan basketball player

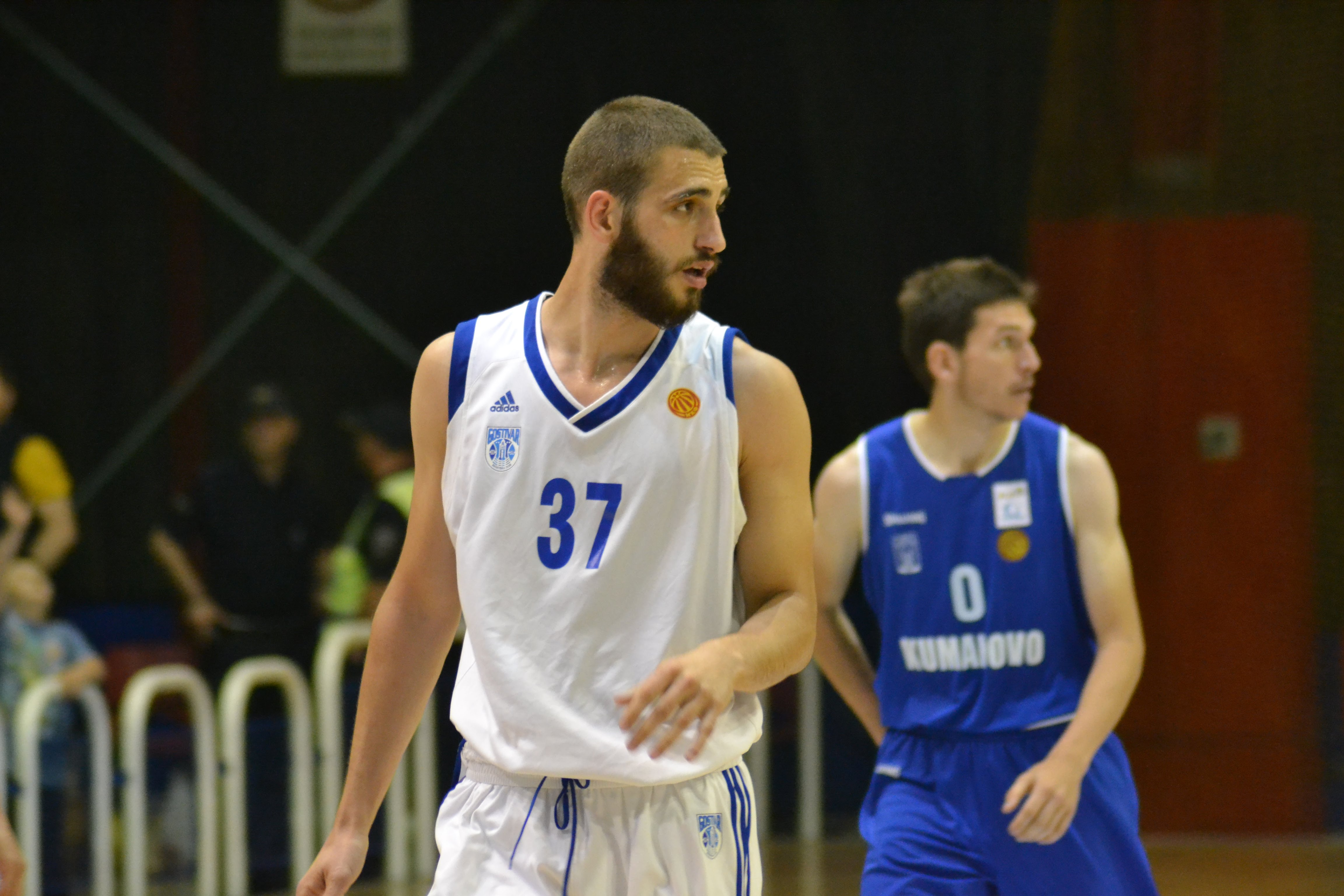

No. 37 – Peja
- Position: Power forward
- League: Kosovo Basketball Superleague

Personal information
- Born: 18 August 1996 (age 30) Skopje, Macedonia
- Listed height: 2.03 m (6 ft 8 in)

Career information
- NBA draft: 2018: undrafted
- Playing career: 2013–present

Career history
- 2013–2015: Liria
- 2015–2017: Vardar
- 2017–2018: Gostivari
- 2018–2019: Kožuv
- 2019–2021: Pelister
- 2021–2023: Prishtina
- 2023–2024: Peja
- 2024–2026: Bora
- 2026–present: Peja

Career highlights
- Kosovo Supercup winner (2022)

Jetmir Zeqiri (born 18 August 1996) is a Macedonian-Kosovan professional basketball player for Peja of the Kosovo Basketball Superleague. He has previously also played for Prishtina and Bora.

== Professional career ==
He started his professional career with KB Liria in 2013. On 17 August 2017, Zeqiri signed with Gostivari.

== Personal life ==
His younger brother Lejson is also a professional basketball player.
