= DaQuan Bracey =

American basketball player (born 1997)

No. 55 – Peja
- Position: Point guard
- League: Kosovo Basketball Superleague

Personal information
- Born: May 13, 1997 (age 29) Bronx, NY, U.S.
- Listed height: 5 ft 11 in (1.80 m)
- Listed weight: 173 lb (78 kg)

Career information
- High school: Saint Frances Academy (Baltimore)
- College: Louisiana Tech (2016–2020)
- NBA draft: 2020: undrafted
- Playing career: 2020–present

Career history
- 2020–2021: Saigon Heat
- 2021–2022: Akhisar Belediyesispor
- 2022: Olomoucko
- 2022–2023: Minsk
- 2023: Ángeles de la Ciudad de México
- 2023–2024: Sutjeska
- 2024: Mineros de Zacatecas
- 2024–2025: Spartak Pleven
- 2025: Ángeles de la Ciudad de México
- 2025–2026: Peja
- 2026: Hanoi Buffaloes
- 2026–present: Peja

Career highlights
- Conference USA Freshman of the Year (2017); Conference USA All-Freshman Team (2017); Conference USA All-Conference First Team (2020); NABC All-District First Team (2020)

DaQuan "DayDay" Bracey (born May 13, 1997) is an American professional basketball player for Peja of the Kosovo Basketball Superleague. He played college basketball for the Louisiana Tech Bulldogs.

== Early life and high school ==
In November 2015, Bracey signed a National Letter of Intent with Louisiana Tech University after leading Saint Frances Academy to the semifinals of the Baltimore Catholic League Tournament. He averaged 15 points, 4.6 rebounds and 7 assists per game and was named first team All-BCL and second team All-Metro in Baltimore. Bracey was also selected first team All-Maryland Interscholastic Athletic Association and was chosen as the MVP of the Charm City Classic in 2015. He played his AAU ball for Baltimore Nike Elite.

== College career ==
In January 2017, Bracey was honored as Freshman of the Week after averaging 17.5 points in games over Charlotte and Old Dominion. He earned Conference USA Freshman of the Year honors and was selected to the All-Freshman Team.

In October 2018, Bracey was selected to the 2018-2019 Preseason All-Conference USA Team as he returned from a back injury. On December 17, 2018, he helped the team with two victories for second straight week as he was selected as men's college basketball Player of the Week by the Louisiana Sports Writers Association (LSWA) after he averaged 20 points while shooting 56 percent from the field.

In February 2019, Bracey was voted as the Conference USA and the LSWA Player of the Week after averaging 25.5 points, 3.5 rebounds and 3.5 assists per game..

In April 2019, after his junior year, Bracey declared for the NBA Draft. He did not sign with an agent, leaving an option to return to school for his senior year. He led the team in scoring that season with an average of 15.5 points per game.

In October 2019, Bracey was selected to the 2019-2020 Preseason All-Conference USA Team. Entering his senior year, he was one of only four Louisiana Tech Bulldogs in program history to have 1,000 career points and 400 career assists.

In March 2020, Bracey selected to the Division 1 All-District 11 Team, voted on by member coaches of the National Association of Basketball Coaches. He was named to the first team and it was his second postseason honor as he was also named First Team All-Conference USA.

In April 2020, Bracey was named First Team All-Louisiana by LSWA. He was one of only two Bulldogs to start all 30 games his senior season. He led the team in minutes played, scoring, and assists for a second straight year.

== Professional career ==
=== Saigon Heat (2021) ===
In February 2021, after going undrafted in the NBA Draft, Bracey began his pro career in Vietnam with the Saigon Heat.

=== KK Sutjeska (2023-2024) ===
On August 1, 2023, Bracey signed with KK Sutjeska of the Prva A Liga. He had previously played with BC Minsk and in those 8 games he averaged 17.4 points, 3 rebounds and 5 assists per game.

== Personal life ==
Bracey is the son of Patrice Bracey and Darrell Williams. He has four siblings.
