= Ify Obidegwu =

American football player

No. 7 – Oregon Ducks
- Position: Cornerback
- Class: Junior

Personal information
- Listed height: 6 ft 1 in (1.85 m)
- Listed weight: 201 lb (91 kg)

Career information
- High school: Saint Frances Academy (Baltimore, Maryland)
- College: Oregon (2024–present)
- Stats at ESPN

Ify Obidegwu is an American college football cornerback for the Oregon Ducks.

== Early life ==
Obidegwu attended Saint Frances Academy in Baltimore, Maryland. A four-star recruit, he was selected to play in the 2024 Under Armour All-America Game. He committed to the University of Oregon to play college football.

== College career ==
Obidegwu did not play in any games and redshirted his first year at Oregon in 2024. In 2025, he played in all 15 games with 12 starts, recording 24 tackles and one interception. Obidegwu returned to Oregon in 2026 as a starter.
