= 2018 college football recruiting class =

Recruiting of students for US college football

The college football recruiting class of 2018 refers to the recruiting of high school athletes to play college football starting in the fall of 2018. The scope of this article covers: (a) the colleges and universities with recruiting classes ranking among the top 20 in the country as assessed by at least one of the major media companies, and (b) the individual recruits ranking among the top 20 in the country as assessed by at least one of the major media companies. Georgia was rated by 247Sports, Rivals and On3 as having the No. 1 recruiting class in 2018. Ohio State was rated by the same selectors at No. 2.

Quarterback Trevor Lawrence was rated by Rivals, 247Sports, and USA Today as the No. 1 recruit in the 2016 class. Lawrence played for Clemson from 2018 to 2020 and for the Jacksonville Jaguars since 2021.

Quarterback Justin Fields was rated by the same selectors as the No. 2 recruit. Fields played for Georgia in 2018, Ohio State in 2019 and 2020, the Chicago Bears from 2021 to 2023, the Pittsburgh Steelers in 2024, and for the New York Jets since 2025.

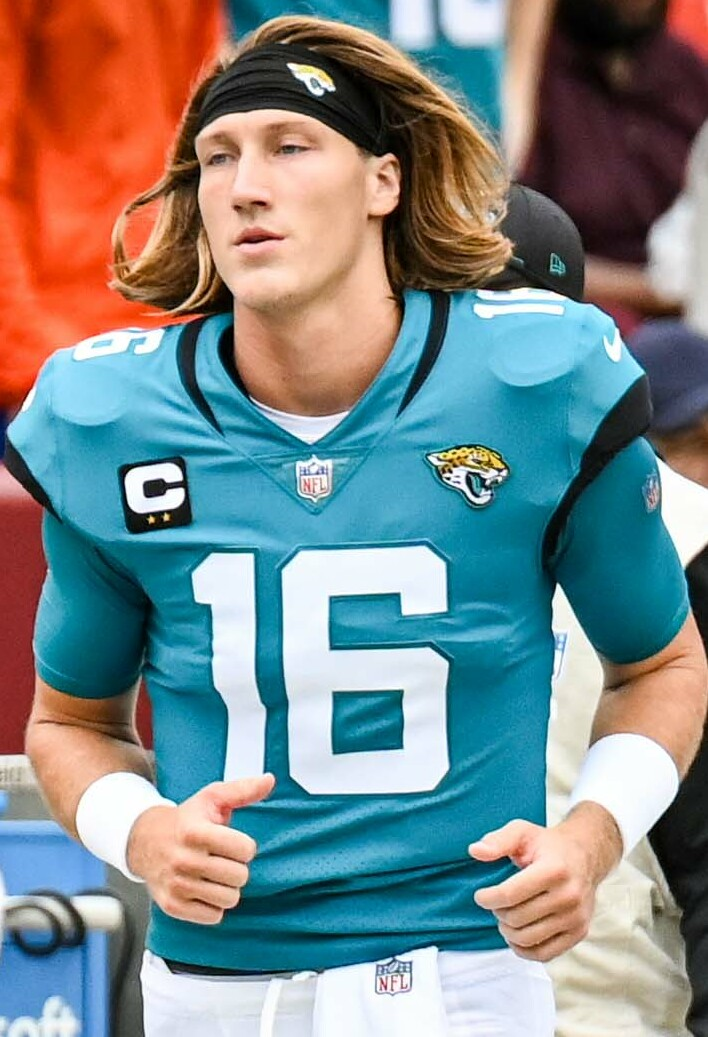
No. 1 Trevor Lawrence

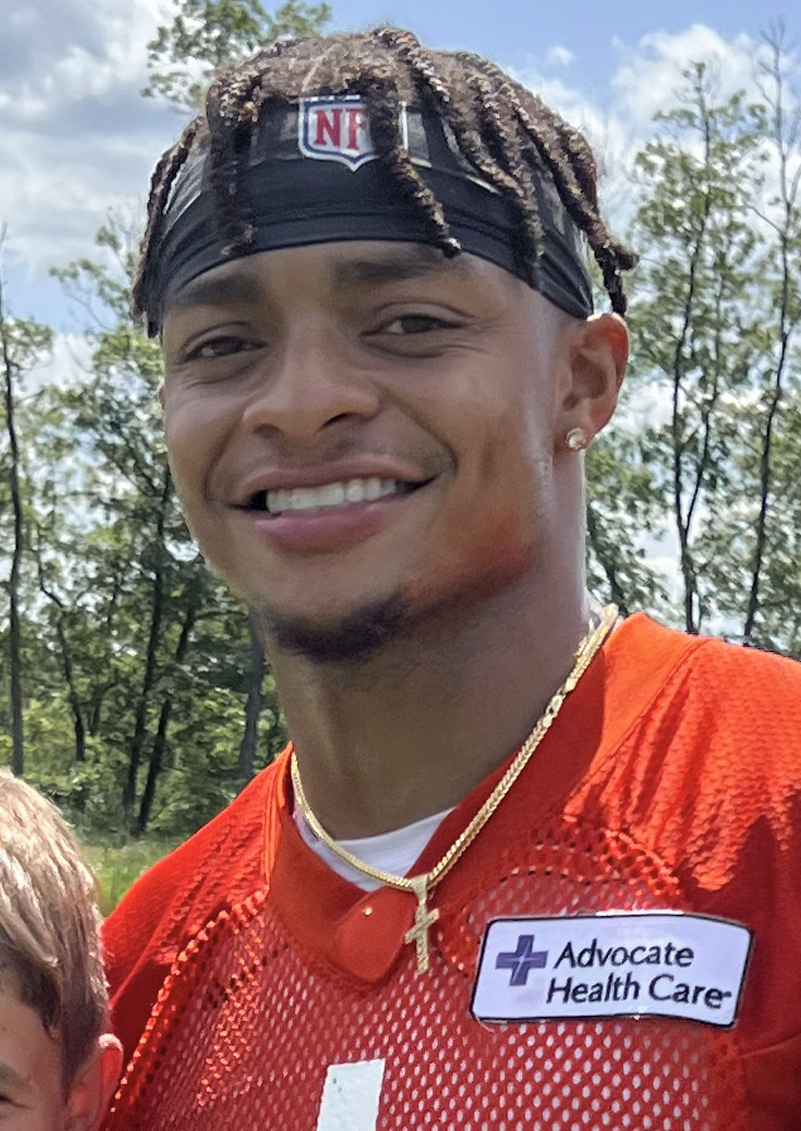
No. 2 Justin Fields

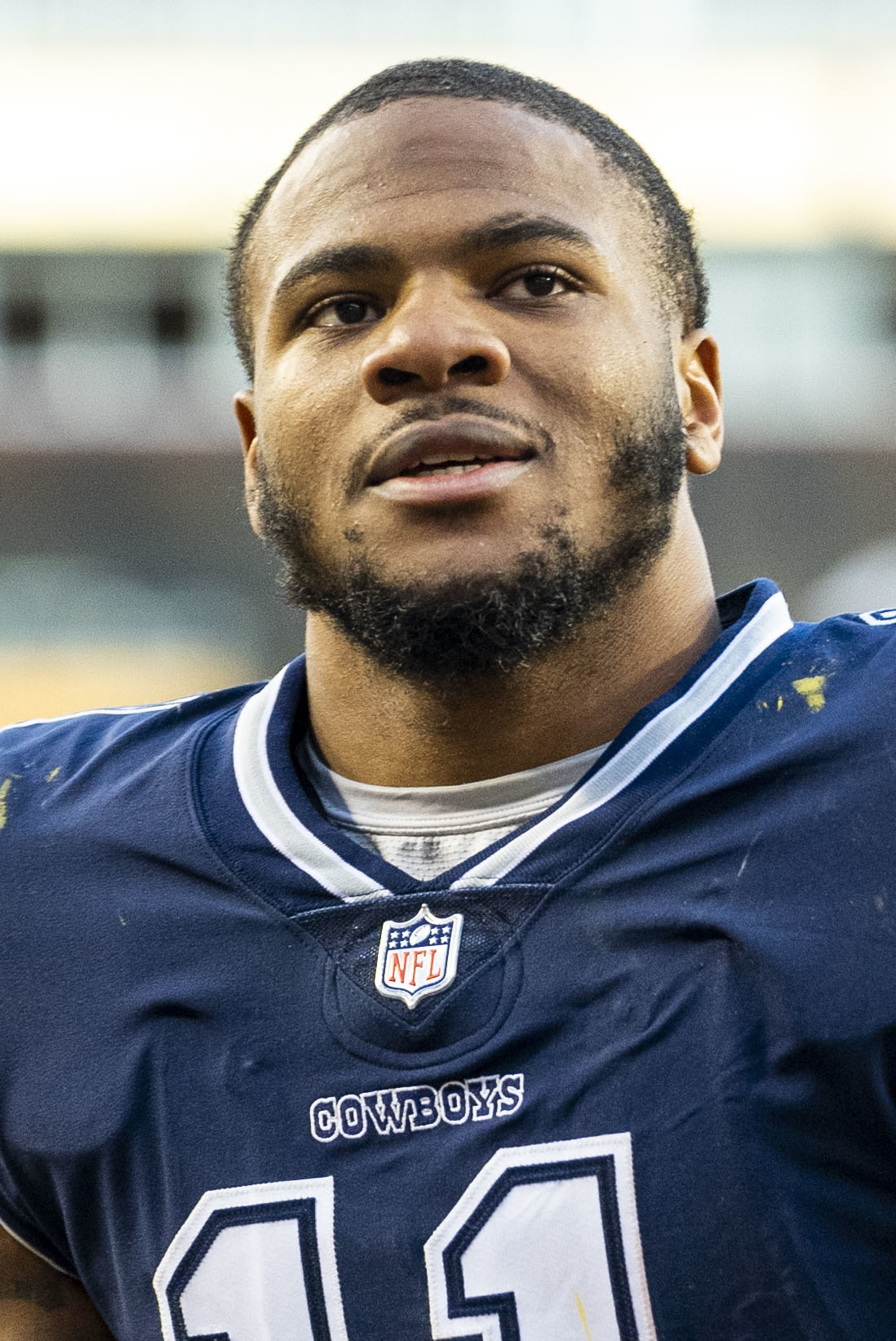
No. 5 Micah Parsons

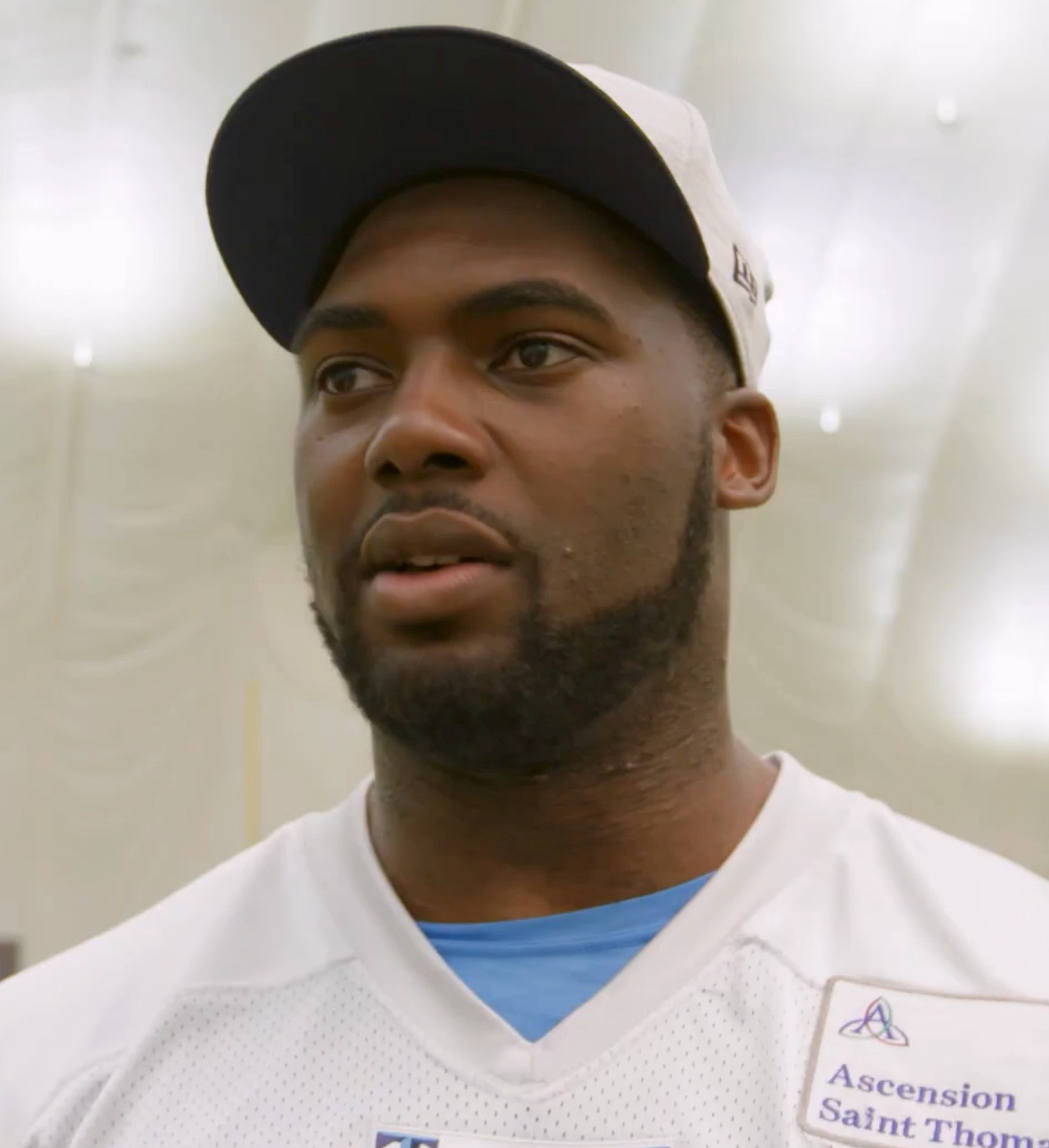
No. 7 Nicholas Petit-Frere

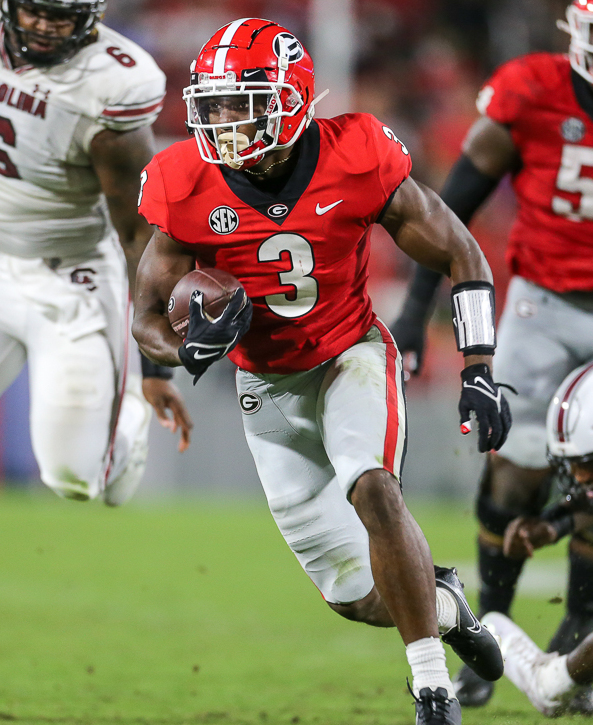
No. 9 Zamir White

== Top ranked classes ==
School	247	Rivals	On3
Georgia	1	1	1
Ohio State	2	2	2
Texas	3	4	3
USC	4	3	4
Alabama	5	7	6
Penn State	6	5	5
Clemson	7	8	7
Miami (FL)	8	6	12
Oklahoma	9	8	8
Notre Dame	10	11	9
Florida State	11	10	13
Auburn	12	12	10
Oregon	13	13	17
Florida	14	17	16
LSU	15	14	11
Washington	16	15	15
Texas A&M	17	16	14
South Carolina	18	18	19
UCLA	19	19	20
North Carolina	20	23	25
Tennessee	21	20	26
Nebraska	23	21	18

== Top ranked recruits ==
Player	Position	School	Rivals	247Sports	USA Today	ESPN
Trevor Lawrence	Quarterback	Clemson	1	1	1	2
Justin Fields	Quarterback	Georgia	2	2	2	1
Eyabi Anoma	Defensive end	Alabama	7	4	3	3
Amon-Ra St. Brown	Wide receiver	USC	3	11	12	35
JT Daniels	Quarterback	USC	4	16	16	64
Xavier Thomas	Defensive end	Clemson	5	3	3	4
Micah Parsons	Linebacker	Penn State	6	5	5	7
Patrick Surtain II	Cornerback	Alabama	8	6	6	5
Jamaree Salyer	Offensive guard	Georgia	9	10	10	23
Zamir White	Running back	Georgia	10	9	9	15
Nick Petit-Frere	Offensive tackle	Ohio State	11	7	7	13
Adam Anderson	Defensive end	Georgia	12	18	19	56
Lorenzo Lingard	Running back	Miami (FL)	13	25	26	60
Tyreke Johnson	Safety	Ohio State	14	34	35	37
Justyn Ross	Wide receiver	Clemson	15	45	48	74
Jackson Carman	Offensive tackle	Clemson	16	17	17	21
Brendan Radley-Hiles	Cornerback	Oklahoma	17	38	39	101
Justin Shorter	Wide receiver	Penn State	18	8	7	8
Cade Mays	Offensive tackle	Georgia	19	22	23	25
Teradja Mitchell	Linebacker	Ohio State	20	44	43	24
Tyson Campbell	Cornerback	Georgia	25	12	11	9
Terrace Marshall Jr.	Wide receiver	LSU	27	13	13	10
KJ Henry	Defensive end	Clemson	26	14	14	6
Palaie Gaoteote IV	Linebacker	USC	21	15	15	18
Caden Sterns	Safety	Texas	24	19	19	39
Taron Vincent	Defensive tackle	Ohio State	40	20	18	19
Brenton Cox Jr.	Defensive end	Georgia	33	23	22	11
B.J. Foster	Safety	Texas	57	24	24	12
Asante Samuel Jr.	Cornerback	Florida State	46	60	57	14
Devon Williams	Athlete	USC	47	40	38	16
Ricky Slade	Running back	Penn State	37	27	25	17
Brevin Jordan	Tight end	Miami	49	33	30	20
