= Neal Sako =

French basketball player (born 1998)

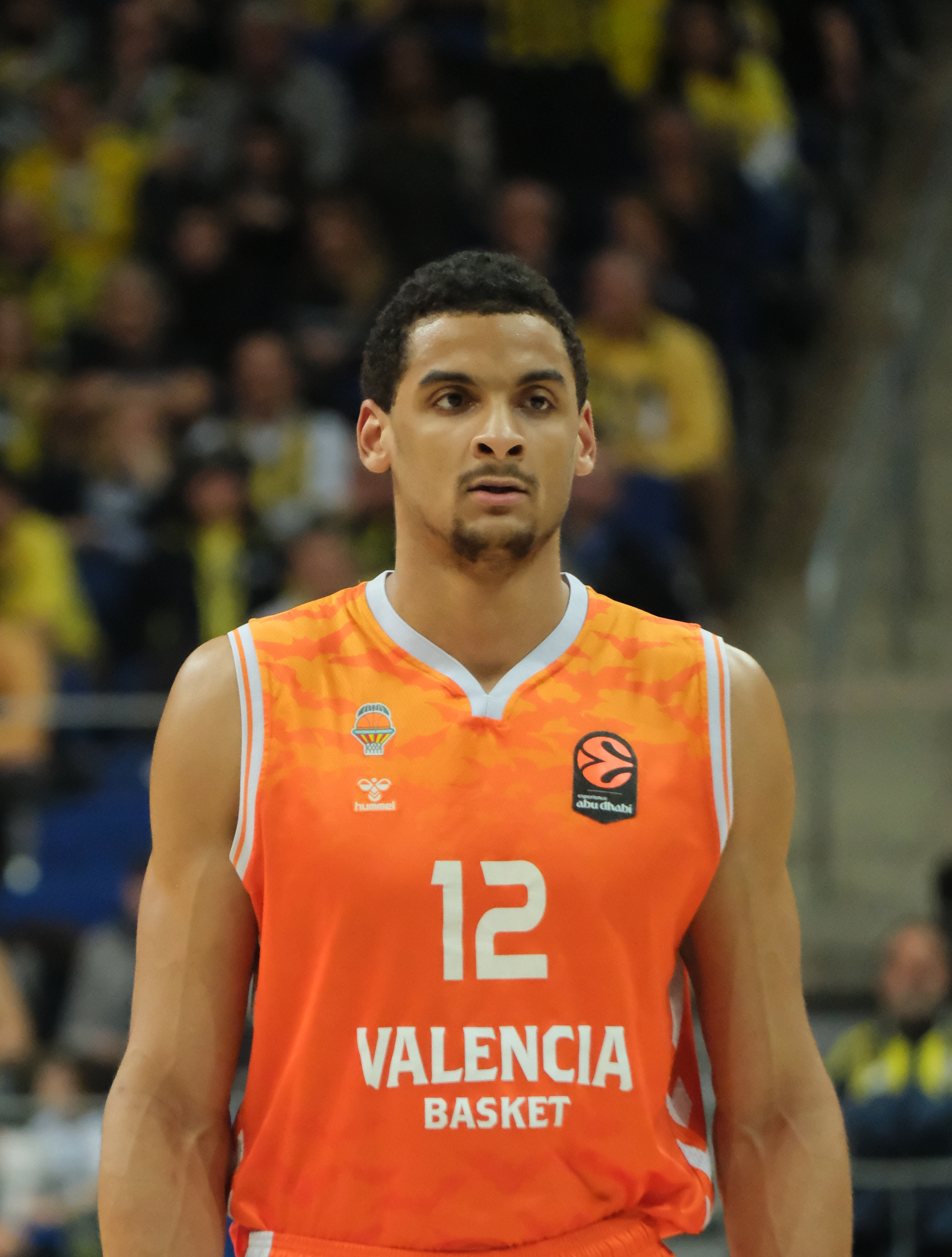
- Sako with Valencia Basket in 2026

No. 13 – Valencia Basket
- Position: Center
- League: Liga ACB; EuroLeague

Personal information
- Born: August 13, 1998 (age 28) Aubergenville, Yvelines, France
- Listed height: 6 ft 11 in (2.11 m)
- Listed weight: 225 lb (102 kg)

Career information
- NBA draft: 2020: undrafted
- Playing career: 2018–present

Career history
- 2018–2021: Metropolitans 92
- 2018–2019: →Rueil Athletic Club
- 2021: →Rueil Athletic Club
- 2021–2022: Champagne
- 2022–2024: Cholet
- 2024–2025: ASVEL
- 2025–present: Valencia

Career highlights
- Liga ACB champion (2026); Spanish Supercup winner (2025)

Neal Sako (born August 13, 1998) is a French professional basketball player for Valencia of the Spanish Liga ACB and the EuroLeague. Standing at 6 ft 11 in (2.11 m), he plays at the center position.

== Professional career ==
On July 2, 2021, Sako signed with Champagne Basket.

On August 2, 2022, Sako joined Cholet. He helped Cholet reach the 2023 FIBA Europe Cup Finals where they lost to Anwil Włocławek.

On June 20, 2024, Sako signed with ASVEL playing in the EuroLeague. In just his second EuroLeague appearance, after an impressing performance posting 19 points, 11 rebounds, 2 steals and 2 blocks, he was named co-MVP of the 2nd round, along with Aleksandar Vezenkov.

On July 3, 2025, he joined Valencia of the Spanish Liga ACB.
