= Malik Williams =

American basketball player (born 1998)

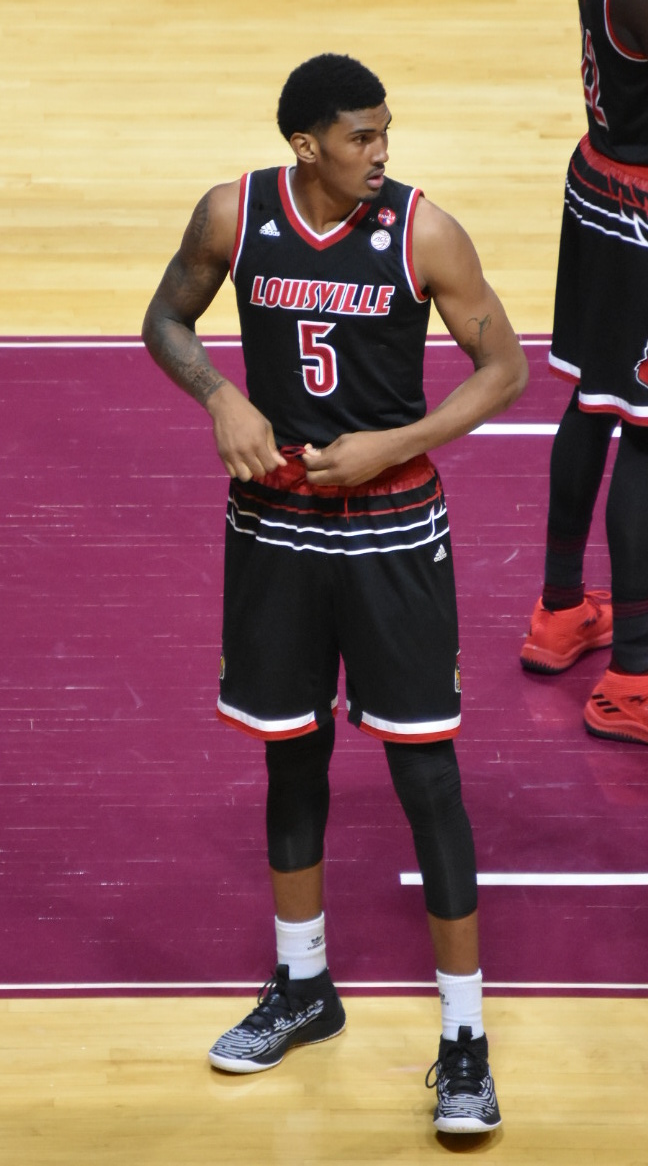
- Williams with Louisville in 2018

No. 35 – Austin Spurs
- Position: Center
- League: NBA G League

Personal information
- Born: August 26, 1998 (age 28) Fort Wayne, Indiana, U.S.
- Listed height: 6 ft 11 in (2.11 m)
- Listed weight: 250 lb (113 kg)

Career information
- High school: R. Nelson Snider (Fort Wayne, Indiana)
- College: Louisville (2017–2022)
- NBA draft: 2022: undrafted
- Playing career: 2023–present

Career history
- 2023: Anwil Włocławek
- 2023–2024: Sioux Falls Skyforce
- 2024: Toronto Raptors
- 2024–2025: Sioux Falls Skyforce
- 2025–2026: College Park Skyhawks
- 2026: South Bay Lakers
- 2026: Zhejiang Lions
- 2026: Mets de Guaynabo
- 2026–present: Austin Spurs

Career highlights
- FIBA Europe Cup champion (2023)
- Stats at NBA.com
- Stats at Basketball Reference

Malik Williams (born August 26, 1998) is an American professional basketball player for the Austin Spurs of the NBA G League. He played college basketball for the Louisville Cardinals.

== High school career ==
Williams played basketball for R. Nelson Snider High School in Fort Wayne, Indiana. As a senior, he averaged 21.5 points, 12.5 rebounds and four blocks per game, leading his team to its first Summit Athletic Conference title since 2009. Williams was one of four finalists for the Indiana Mr. Basketball award. He left as the program's all-time leader in rebounds and blocks.

=== Recruiting ===
Williams was considered a five-star recruit by 247Sports and ESPN, and a four-star recruit by Rivals. On August 4, 2016, he committed to playing college basketball for Louisville over offers from Purdue, Michigan State and Indiana, among others.

College recruiting
Name	Hometown	School	Height	Weight	Commit date
Malik Williams; PF / C	Fort Wayne, IN	R. Nelson Snider (IN)	6 ft 11 in (2.11 m)	215 lb (98 kg)	Aug 4, 2016
Malik Williams; PF / C	Recruit ratings: Rivals: 247Sports: ESPN: (90)				
Overall recruit ranking: Rivals: 30 247Sports: 31 ESPN: 29
Note: In many cases, Scout, Rivals, 247Sports, On3, and ESPN may conflict in their listings of height and weight.; In these cases, the average was taken. ESPN grades are on a 100-point scale.; Sources: "Louisville 2017 Basketball Commitments". Rivals.; "2017 Louisville Cardinals Recruiting Class". ESPN.; "2017 Team Ranking". Rivals.

== College career ==
As a freshman at Louisville, Williams averaged 3.8 points and 2.4 rebounds per game. On January 6, 2019, he posted a career-high 19 points and 11 rebounds in a 90–73 win against Miami (Florida). Williams averaged 7.7 points and 6.1 rebounds per game as a sophomore. He missed the first four games of his junior season after undergoing surgery for a broken foot. As a junior, Williams averaged 8.5 points and 6.1 rebounds per game, and was the runner-up for Atlantic Coast Conference Sixth Man of the Year. He was limited to three games in his senior season after reinjuring his foot twice. He returned to Louisville for his fifth season of eligibility, granted due to the COVID-19 pandemic. On February 1, 2022, Williams was indefinitely suspended due to failing to uphold program standards, but was reinstated on February 7 after missing two games.

== Professional career ==
=== Anwil Włocławek (2023) ===
After going undrafted in the 2022 NBA draft, Williams signed with Anwil Włocławek of the Polish Basketball League on January 1, 2023.

=== Sioux Falls Skyforce (2023–2024) ===
On October 30, 2023, Williams joined the Sioux Falls Skyforce as a tryout player, but was waived on November 8. Five days later, he re-joined the Skyforce where he played 33 games and averaged 11.1 points, 9.3 rebounds and 1.4 assists in 23.2 minutes.

=== Toronto Raptors (2024) ===
On April 3, 2024, Williams signed a 10-day contract with the Toronto Raptors. On April 13, he signed with Toronto for the rest of the season.

=== Return to Sioux Falls (2024–2025) ===
On September 11, 2024, Williams signed with the Miami Heat, but was waived the next day. On October 28, he rejoined the Sioux Falls Skyforce.

=== College Park Skyhawks (2025–2026) ===
On September 24, 2025, Williams signed with the Atlanta Hawks. He was waived two days later, and joined the Hawks' NBA G League affaliate, the College Park Skyhawks.

Williams joined the Milwaukee Bucks for the 2025 NBA Summer League. On December 23, 2025, Williams signed with the Atlanta Hawks on a two-way contract. During the Tip-Off Tournament with the Hawks' NBA G League affiliate, the College Park Skyhawks, Williams averaged 16.2 points and 10.4 rebounds across 14 games. He was released from his two-way contract on January 7, 2026. Williams had not appeared in any games for the Hawks, but was retained by the Skyhawks.

=== South Bay Lakers (2026) ===
On February 20, 2026, Williams was traded to the South Bay Lakers.

=== Zhejiang Lions (2026) ===
In April 2026, Williams signed with the Zhejiang Lions of the Chinese Basketball Association.

=== Mets de Guaynabo (2026) ===
On June 11, 2026, Williams signed with Mets de Guaynabo of the Puerto Rican Baloncesto Superior Nacional.

=== San Antonio Spurs (2026) ===
Williams joined the Chicago Bulls for the 2026 NBA Summer League. On September 24, 2026, Williams signed with the San Antonio Spurs.

== Career statistics ==
Legend
GP	Games played	GS	Games started	MPG	Minutes per game
FG%	Field goal percentage	3P%	3-point field goal percentage	FT%	Free throw percentage
RPG	Rebounds per game	APG	Assists per game	SPG	Steals per game
BPG	Blocks per game	PPG	Points per game	**Bold**	Career high

=== NBA ===
==== Regular season ====
Year	Team	GP	GS	MPG	FG%	3P%	FT%	RPG	APG	SPG	BPG	PPG
2023–24	Toronto	7	2	15.2	.265	.200	.000	5.4	.3	.4	.6	2.7
Career		7	2	15.2	.265	.200	.000	5.4	.3	.4	.6	2.7

=== College ===
Year	Team	GP	GS	MPG	FG%	3P%	FT%	RPG	APG	SPG	BPG	PPG
2017–18	Louisville	32	12	10.6	.418	**.323**	.688	2.4	.2	.4	.4	3.8
2018–19	Louisville	**34**	**20**	18.2	.420	.318	**.701**	**6.1**	.3	.3	**1.2**	7.7
2019–20	Louisville	26	3	18.7	**.497**	.290	.648	**6.1**	.3	.5	.6	**8.5**
2020–21	Louisville	3	2	**20.7**	.300	.286	.250	6.0	**1.0**	**.7**	.0	5.0
Career		95	37	15.8	.439	.314	.667	4.9	.3	.4	.7	6.5

== Personal life ==
Williams has worn the number 5 jersey and has a tattoo on his right forearm to honor his friend and former R. Nelson Snider High School girls basketball player, Peytin Chamble, who died in a car accident at age 17.
