= Josip Sobin =

Croatian basketball player (born 1989)

No. 8 – Cedevita Junior
- Position: Center
- League: Croatian League; ABA League Second Division

Personal information
- Born: August 31, 1989 (age 37) Split, SR Croatia, SFR Yugoslavia
- Listed height: 2.04 m (6 ft 8 in)
- Listed weight: 105 kg (231 lb)

Career information
- NBA draft: 2011: undrafted
- Playing career: 2006–present

Career history
- 2006–2013: Split
- 2008–2009: →Trogir
- 2013–2015: Zadar
- 2015–2016: Fuenlabrada
- 2016–2019: Anwil Włocławek
- 2019–2020: Vanoli Cremona
- 2020–2021: Stal Ostrów Wielkopolski
- 2021–2022: MKS Dąbrowa Górnicza
- 2022–2023: Anwil Włocławek
- 2023–2024: Legia Warszawa
- 2024–present: Cedevita Junior

Career highlights
- FIBA Europe Cup champion (2023); 2× Polish League champion (2018, 2019); Polish Cup winner (2024)

Josip Sobin (born August 31, 1989) is a Croatian professional basketball player currently playing for Cedevita Junior of the Croatian League and ABA League Second Division. Standing at 2.04 m, he plays at the power forward and center positions.

== Professional career ==
Sobin grew up in KK Split and made his pro debut with the team in 2006. During the 2008–09 season he was loaned to KK Trogir competing in the top level Croatian basketball league. He spent three more seasons in Split playing in the Croatian League and the 2012–13 season in the Adriatic League also (9.3 pts, 5.0 rbs, 1.2 ass). After the club suffered a financial breakdown, in September 2013 he signed a three-year contract with Zadar. In December 2014, he was named the ABA League MVP of the month. In June 2015, he left Zadar due to the financial problems of the club. In July 2015, he signed with Spanish club Fuenlabrada for the 2015–16 season. On June 30, 2016, he signed with Polish club Anwil Włocławek. In June 2018 he signed another one-year contract with the same team.

On September 19, 2019, he has signed with Vanoli Cremona of the Italian Lega Basket Serie A (LBA).

On June 21, 2020, he signed with Stal Ostrów Wielkopolski of the Polish Basketball League (PLK).

On June 12, 2021, he has signed with MKS Dąbrowa Górnicza of the Polish Basketball League (PLK).

On July 29, 2022, he has signed with Anwil Włocławek of the Polish Basketball League.

On August 5, 2023, he signed with Legia Warszawa of the Polish Basketball League.

In August, 2024, Sobin returned to Croatia signing a one-year contract with Cedevita Junior of the Croatian League and ABA League Second Division.

== Personal life ==
His father Goran Sobin, was also a basketball player and a two-time winner of the European Cup (1989, 1990) with Jugoplastika. His cousin, Slavko Sobin, is an actor.
