= Hala Mistrzów =

Arena in Włocławek, Poland

Coordinates: 52°38′31″N 19°4′43″E

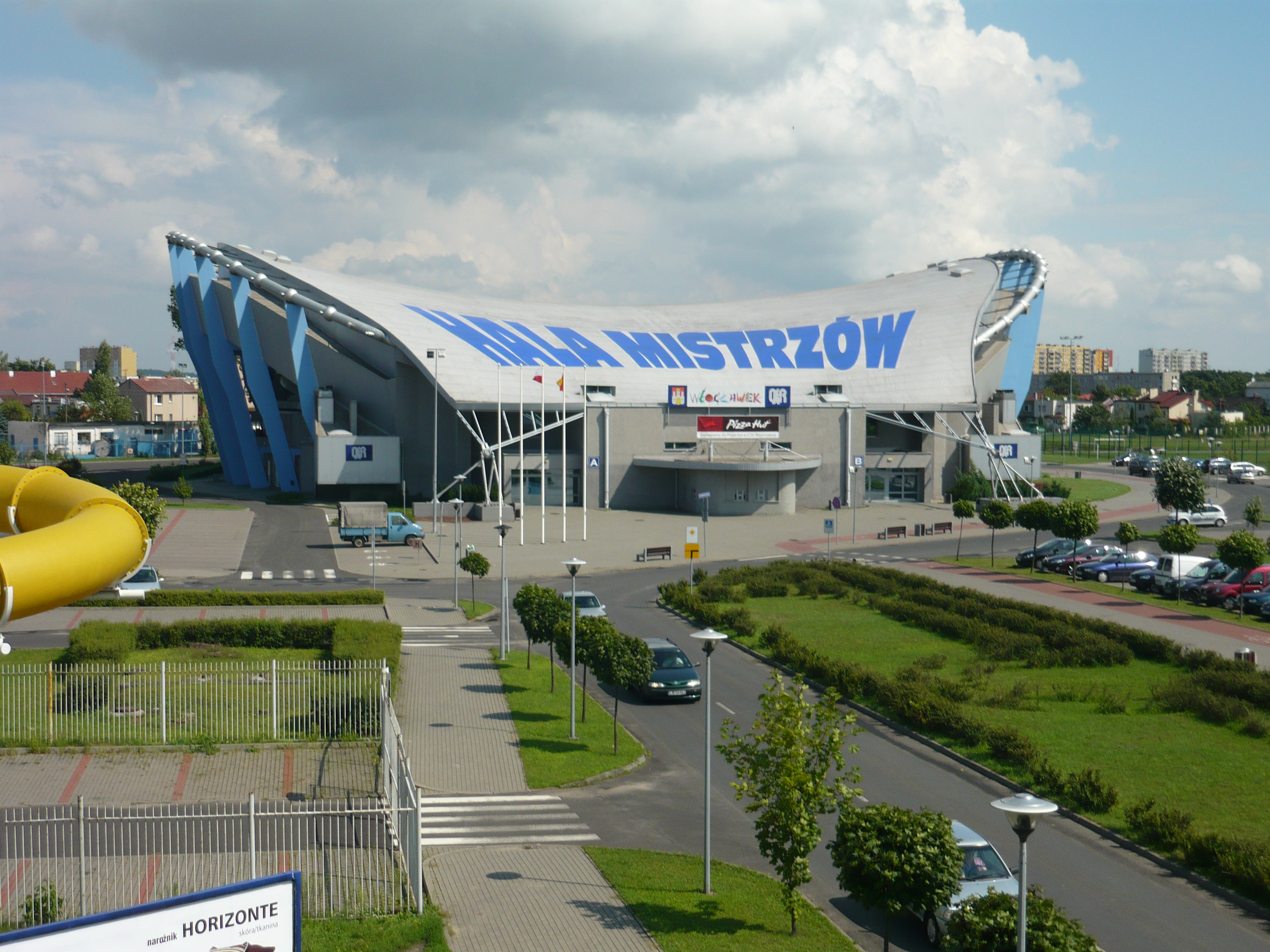
Hala Mistrzów

Hala Mistrzów (polish: Hall of Champions) is an arena in Włocławek, Poland. It is primarily used for basketball. Hala Mistrzow holds 3,963 people and hosts the home games of Anwil Włocławek.
