= 2022–23 FIBA Europe Cup =

8th season of the FIBA Europe Cup

- Season: 2022–23
- Dates: Qualifying: 27–30 September 2022; Competition proper: 12 October 2022 – 26 April 2023
- Teams: 32 (regular season); 47 (all rounds)

Finals
- Champions: (Poland) Anwil Włocławek (1st title)
- Runners-up: (France) Cholet Basket
- Semi-finalists: (Estonia) Kalev/Cramo (Finland) Karhu
- Finals MVP: (United States) Phil Greene IV

Statistical leaders
Points	(Slovenia) Miha Lapornik	19.8
Rebounds	(The Gambia) Ousman Krubally	11.0
Assists	(Lithuania) Arnas Velička	7.8
Index Rating	(The Gambia) Ousman Krubally	23.7

Seasons
- ← 2021–22 2023–24 →

The 2022–23 FIBA Europe Cup was the 8th season of the FIBA Europe Cup, the second-level European professional club basketball competition organised by FIBA. The season began on 12 October 2022 and ended on 26 April 2023.

Anwil Włocławek defeated Cholet in the finals, which were played over two legs in both club's arenas. They became the first Polish club to win a European competition title.

== Team allocation ==
18 teams eliminated in the Basketball Champions League qualification rounds could join directly the regular season, depending on their decision as declared in the FIBA Europe Cup option form. The following 5 teams chose the option of ending their continental adventure if they were eliminated from the Champions League qualifying rounds and therefore refuse to participate in the FIBA Europe Cup:

- (Spain) Río Breogán
- (United Kingdom) Leicester Riders
- (Lithuania) Šiauliai
- (North Macedonia) TFT Skopje
- (Serbia) FMP Meridian

=== Teams ===
- 1st, 2nd, etc.: Place in the domestic competition
- CL QR1, QR2, QR3: Losers from the Champions League qualifying rounds

Regular season
(Germany) Brose Bamberg (CL QR3)	(Czech Republic) Opava (CL QR2)	(Estonia) Pärnu Sadam (CL QR1)	(Spain) ~~Río Breogán~~ (CL QR1)	(Italy) Brindisi (11th)
(Germany) Niners Chemnitz (CL QR3)	(Finland) Karhu (CL QR2)	(United Kingdom) ~~Leicester Riders~~ (CL QR1)	(Sweden) Norrköping Dolphins (CL QR1)	(Netherlands) Donar (CW)
(Serbia) ~~FMP Meridian~~ (CL QR3)	(Netherlands) Heroes Den Bosch (CL QR2)	(Hungary) Egis Körmend (CL QR1)	(Belgium) Kangoeroes Mechelen (2nd)	(Poland) Anwil Włocławek (3rd)
(Slovakia) Patrioti Levice (CL QR3)	(Romania) CSO Voluntari (CL QR2)	(Kosovo) Golden Eagles Ylli (CL QR1)	(Bulgaria) Balkan (1st)	(Portugal) FC Porto (2nd)
(Austria) Swans Gmunden (CL QR2)	(Switzerland) Fribourg Olympic (CL QR2)	(Lithuania) ~~Šiauliai~~ (CL QR1)	(Germany) Hakro Merlins Crailsheim (9th)	(Romania) CSM Oradea (3rd)
(Cyprus) Keravnos (CL QR2)	(Ukraine) Budivelnyk (CL QR2)	(North Macedonia) ~~TFT Skopje~~ (CL QR1)	(Israel) Hapoel Galil Elyon (5th)	(Turkey) Gaziantep (5th)
Qualifying rounds
(Kosovo) Trepça (2nd)	(Belgium) Antwerp Giants (5th)	(Finland) Kataja (4th)	(Israel) Hapoel Haifa (6th)	(Sweden) Jämtland Basket (2nd)
(Kosovo) KB Prishtina (3rd)	(Bulgaria) Rilski Sportist (2nd)	(France) Cholet (8th)	(Netherlands) ZZ Leiden (2nd)	(Turkey) Beşiktaş Emlakjet (10th)
(Lithuania) Cbet Jonava (5th)	(Croatia) Cedevita Junior (5th)	(Germany) Göttingen (10th)	(Poland) Czarni Słupsk (4th)	
(Lithuania) Wolves (8th)	(Cyprus) Petrolina AEK Larnaca (2nd)	(Greece) Aris (7th)	(Portugal) Sporting CP (3rd)	
(Austria) Kapfenberg Bulls (6th)	(Estonia) Kalev/Cramo (3rd)	(Iceland) Þór Þorlákshöfn (4th)	(Romania) SCMU Craiova (5th)	

== Schedule ==
The schedule of the competition will be as follows.

Schedule for 2022–23 FIBA Europe Cup
Phase	Round	Draw date	First leg	Second leg
Qualifying rounds	First qualifying round	14 July 2022	27 September 2022	
Qualifying rounds	Second qualifying round	14 July 2022	28 September 2022	
Qualifying rounds	Third qualifying round	14 July 2022	30 September 2022	
Regular season	Round 1	14 July 2022	12 October 2022	
Regular season	Round 2	14 July 2022	19 October 2022	
Regular season	Round 3	14 July 2022	26 October 2022	
Regular season	Round 4	14 July 2022	2 November 2022	
Regular season	Round 5	14 July 2022	23 November 2022	
Regular season	Round 6	14 July 2022	30 November 2022	
Second round	Round 1	14 July 2022	14 December 2022	
Second round	Round 2	14 July 2022	21 December 2022	
Second round	Round 3	14 July 2022	11 January 2023	
Second round	Round 4	14 July 2022	25 January 2023	
Second round	Round 5	14 July 2022	1 February 2023	
Second round	Round 6	14 July 2022	8 February 2023	
Quarter-finals		14 July 2022	6–8 March 2023	14–15 March 2023
Semi-finals		14 July 2022	29 March 2023	5 April 2023
Finals		14 July 2022	19 April 2023	26 April 2023

== Qualifying rounds ==
=== Draw ===
The 22 teams will be divided into 6 pots. For the quarter-finals round of Qualifications, teams from Pot 5 will be drawn against teams from Pot 4 and teams from pot 6 will be drawn against two teams from Pot 3. Teams from Pot 1, 2 and the other two teams from pot 3 will be seeded, and will enter directly in the semi-final stage of Qualifications. The winners of the semi-final stage will face each other in the finals of Qualifications. The four winners of the finals will then qualify for the Regular season and join the ten directly qualified teams and the 18 Basketball Champions League eliminated teams in the main draw.

Pot 1 Team (Netherlands) ZZ Leiden (Portugal) Sporting CP (Austria) Kapfenberg Bulls (Bulgaria) Rilski Sportist	Pot 2 Team (Belgium) Antwerp Giants (Finland) Kataja (Kosovo) KB Prishtina (Turkey) Beşiktaş Emlakjet	Pot 3 Team (Israel) Hapoel Haifa (France) Cholet (Estonia) Kalev/Cramo (Cyprus) Petrolina AEK Larnaca
Pot 4 Team (Romania) SCMU Craiova (Poland) Czarni Słupsk (Germany) Göttingen (Greece) Aris	Pot 5 Team (Lithuania) Cbet Jonava (Lithuania) Wolves (Kosovo) Trepça (Sweden) Jämtland Basket	Pot 6 Team (Croatia) Cedevita Junior (Iceland) Þór Þorlákshöfn

==== Qualification Group A ====
Venue: Mitrovica, Kosovo

Quarter-finals
27 September
(Germany) Göttingen	76
(Kosovo) Trepça	62
27 September
(Cyprus) Petrolina AEK Larnaca	77
(Iceland) Þór Þorlákshöfn	68

Semi-finals
28 September
(Germany) Göttingen	83
(Portugal) Sporting CP	84
28 September
(Cyprus) Petrolina AEK Larnaca	60
(Belgium) Antwerp Giants	76

Final
30 September
(Portugal) Sporting CP	98
(Belgium) Antwerp Giants	85

==== Qualification Group B ====
Venue: Jonava, Lithuania

Quarter-finals
27 September
(Romania) SCMU Craiova	65
(Lithuania) Cbet Jonava	59
27 September
(Estonia) Kalev/Cramo	93
(Croatia) Cedevita Junior	73

Semi-finals
28 September
(Romania) SCMU Craiova	71
(Austria) Kapfenberg Bulls	55
28 September
(Estonia) Kalev/Cramo	98
(Kosovo) KB Prishtina	61

Final
30 September
(Romania) SCMU Craiova	79
(Estonia) Kalev/Cramo	84

==== Qualification Group C ====
Venue: Samokov, Bulgaria

Quarter-finals
27 September
(Greece) Aris	72
(Lithuania) Wolves	83

Semi-finals
28 September
(Lithuania) Wolves	76
(Bulgaria) Rilski Sportist	91
28 September
(Finland) Kataja	64
(Israel) Hapoel Haifa	75

Final
30 September
(Bulgaria) Rilski Sportist	61
(Israel) Hapoel Haifa	68

==== Qualification Group D ====
Venue: Cholet, France

Quarter-finals
27 September
(Poland) Czarni Słupsk	83
(Sweden) Jämtland Basket	73

Semi-finals
28 September
(Poland) Czarni Słupsk	74
(Netherlands) ZZ Leiden	78
28 September
(Turkey) Beşiktaş Emlakjet	62
(France) Cholet	93

Final
30 September
(Netherlands) ZZ Leiden	59
(France) Cholet	71

==== Lucky losers ====
Following the qualification of Tofaş, Unicaja and Bakken Bears to the Champions League, three lucky losers will also qualify for the regular season. Their identity will be determined in accordance with section D from FIBA Basketball Rules as follows:

1. Point difference of the combined results from the Semi-Finals and Finals will be used as the first criterion.
2. Points scored in the Semi-Finals and Finals will be used as the second criterion.
3. If the identity of the two is not determined using the previous two criteria, a draw will be held to determine the final classification.

Pos	Team	PF	PA	PD	Qualification
1	(Romania) SCMU Craiova	150	139	+11	Advance to regular season
2	(Bulgaria) Rilski Sportist	152	144	+8	Advance to regular season
3	(Belgium) Antwerp Giants	161	158	+3	Advance to regular season
4	(Netherlands) ZZ Leiden	137	145	-8	

== Regular season ==
=== Draw ===
The draw took place in Munich, Germany on July 14.

The thirty-two teams were divided into 4 seeds and drawn into eight groups of four. A maximum of two clubs from the same country can be in the same group. In each group, teams play against each other home-and-away in a round-robin format. The group winners and runners-up advance to the second round, while the third and fourth-placed teams are eliminated.

Seed 1 Team (Romania) CSM Oradea (Germany) Hakro Merlins Crailsheim (Netherlands) Donar (Turkey) Gaziantep (Bulgaria) Balkan (Poland) Anwil Włocławek (Portugal) FC Porto (Israel) Hapoel Galil Elyon	Seed 2 Team (Germany) Brose Bamberg (Turkey) ~~Tofaş~~^{⊕} (Switzerland) Fribourg Olympic (Spain) ~~Unicaja~~^{⊕} (Finland) Karhu (Denmark) ~~Bakken Bears~~^{⊕} (Czech Republic) Opava (Italy) Brindisi	Seed 3 Team (Belgium) Kangoeroes Mechelen (Ukraine) Budivelnyk (Cyprus) Keravnos (Romania) CSO Voluntari (Germany) Niners Chemnitz (Netherlands) Heroes Den Bosch (Hungary) Körmend (Austria) Swans Gmunden	Seed 4 Team (Sweden) Norrköping Dolphins (Kosovo) Golden Eagles Ylli (Slovakia) Patrioti Levice (Estonia) Pärnu (Portugal) Sporting CP (Winner Qualifying A) (Estonia) Kalev/Cramo (Winner Qualifying B) (Israel) Hapoel Haifa (Winner Qualifying C) (France) Cholet (Winner Qualifying D)

Notes

^⊕ Indicates teams that qualify for BCL Regular Season, and three runners-up of the FEC Qualifiers filled their spots.

=== Group A ===
Pos	Team	Pld	W	L	PF	PA	PD	Pts	Qualification	CHE	BRO	HGE	YLL
1	(Germany) Niners Chemnitz	6	4	2	544	446	+98	10	Advance to second round	—	85–89	111–79	90–60
2	(Germany) Brose Bamberg	6	4	2	504	474	+30	10	Advance to second round	68–84	—	95–78	78–81
3	(Israel) Hapoel Galil Elyon	6	3	3	499	526	−27	9		78–73	86–98	—	85–73
4	(Kosovo) Golden Eagles Ylli	6	1	5	422	523	−101	7		72–101	60–76	76–93	—

Source: Groups Standings
Legend: Blue = home team win; Red = away team win.

=== Group B ===
Pos	Team	Pld	W	L	PF	PA	PD	Pts	Qualification	HHA	GAZ	ANT	GMU
1	(Israel) Hapoel Haifa	6	5	1	415	397	+18	11	Advance to second round	—	63–79	75–64	77–70
2	(Turkey) Gaziantep	6	3	3	464	446	+18	9	Advance to second round	69–79	—	82–63	84–71
3	(Belgium) Antwerp Giants	6	2	4	448	466	−18	8		55–56	87–75	—	87–90
4	(Austria) Swans Gmunden	6	2	4	462	480	−18	8		60–65	83–75	88–92	—

Source: Groups Standings
Legend: Blue = home team win; Red = away team win.

=== Group C ===
Pos	Team	Pld	W	L	PF	PA	PD	Pts	Qualification	HDB	POR	FRI	PAR
1	(Netherlands) Heroes Den Bosch	6	4	2	462	410	+52	10	Advance to second round	—	82–64	77–65	87–55
2	(Portugal) FC Porto	6	3	3	465	460	+5	9	Advance to second round	68–71	—	87–73	87–64
3	(Switzerland) Fribourg Olympic	6	3	3	477	476	+1	9		83–78	75–76	—	82–64
4	(Estonia) Pärnu	6	2	4	447	505	−58	8		75–67	95–83	94–99	—

Source: Groups Standings
Legend: Blue = home team win; Red = away team win.

=== Group D ===
Pos	Team	Pld	W	L	PF	PA	PD	Pts	Qualification	KER	LEV	OPA	BAL
1	(Cyprus) Keravnos	6	3	3	478	456	+22	9	Advance to second round	—	77–68	74–79	82–61
2	(Slovakia) Patrioti Levice	6	3	3	474	470	+4	9	Advance to second round	86–80	—	94–80	83–91
3	(Czech Republic) Opava	6	3	3	463	475	−12	9		77–89	80–70	—	83–69
4	(Bulgaria) Balkan	6	3	3	447	461	−14	9		85–76	62–73	79–64	—

Source: Groups Standings
Legend: Blue = home team win; Red = away team win.

=== Group E ===
Pos	Team	Pld	W	L	PF	PA	PD	Pts	Qualification	ORA	CHO	MEC	RIL
1	(Romania) CSM Oradea	6	5	1	531	441	+90	11	Advance to second round	—	77–69	98–76	99–63
2	(France) Cholet	6	4	2	525	455	+70	10	Advance to second round	99–81	—	89–69	100–75
3	(Belgium) Kangoeroes Mechelen	6	3	3	510	498	+12	9		72–86	88–85	—	105–74
4	(Bulgaria) Rilski Sportist	6	0	6	405	577	−172	6		62–90	65–83	66–100	—

Source: Groups Standings
Legend: Blue = home team win; Red = away team win.

=== Group F ===
Pos	Team	Pld	W	L	PF	PA	PD	Pts	Qualification	KAL	BUD	BRI	DON
1	(Estonia) Kalev/Cramo	6	5	1	486	406	+80	11	Advance to second round	—	75–66	73–72	75–65
2	(Ukraine) Budivelnyk	6	4	2	467	453	+14	10	Advance to second round	74–83	—	93–83	86–81
3	(Italy) Brindisi	6	3	3	481	448	+33	9		88–86	70–74	—	81–57
4	(Netherlands) Donar	6	0	6	370	497	−127	6		41–94	61–74	65–87	—

Source: Groups Standings
Legend: Blue = home team win; Red = away team win.

=== Group G ===
Pos	Team	Pld	W	L	PF	PA	PD	Pts	Qualification	KAU	ANW	SPO	KOR
1	(Finland) Karhu	6	5	1	540	501	+39	11	Advance to second round	—	87–93	104–85	77–62
2	(Poland) Anwil Włocławek	6	4	2	549	475	+74	10	Advance to second round	88–89	—	73–85	88–58
3	(Portugal) Sporting CP	6	3	3	531	565	−34	9		84–93	89–113	—	89–84
4	(Hungary) Körmend	6	0	6	458	537	−79	6		89–90	67–94	98–99	—

Source: Groups Standings
Legend: Blue = home team win; Red = away team win.

=== Group H ===
Pos	Team	Pld	W	L	PF	PA	PD	Pts	Qualification	UCR	CRA	VOL	NOR
1	(Romania) SCMU Craiova	6	5	1	465	425	+40	11	Advance to second round	—	81–102	70–61	77–63
2	(Germany) Hakro Merlins Crailsheim	6	4	2	513	451	+62	10	Advance to second round	60–73	—	76–61	95–64
3	(Romania) CSO Voluntari	6	2	4	413	443	−30	8		60–74	79–93	—	75–60
4	(Sweden) Norrköping Dolphins	6	1	5	429	501	−72	7		79–90	93–87	70–77	—

Source: Groups Standings
Legend: Blue = home team win; Red = away team win.

== Second round ==
=== Group I ===
Pos	Team	Pld	W	L	PF	PA	PD	Pts	Qualification	CHO	POR	CHE	UCR
1	(France) Cholet	6	5	1	479	450	+29	11	Advance to quarter-finals	—	95–83	77–75	75–56
2	(Portugal) FC Porto	6	4	2	523	483	+40	10	Advance to quarter-finals	99–78	—	74–86	90–64
3	(Germany) Niners Chemnitz	6	3	3	499	469	+30	9		73–83	87–94	—	93–62
4	(Romania) SCMU Craiova	6	0	6	398	497	−99	6		64–71	73–83	79–85	—

Source: Second Round Standings
Legend: Blue = home team win; Red = away team win.

=== Group J ===
Pos	Team	Pld	W	L	PF	PA	PD	Pts	Qualification	KAU	BUD	LEV	HHA
1	(Finland) Karhu	6	5	1	476	391	+85	11	Advance to quarter-finals	—	62–65	105–71	85–76
2	(Ukraine) Budivelnyk	6	3	3	431	452	−21	9	Advance to quarter-finals	65–72	—	72–82	81–79
3	(Slovakia) Patrioti Levice	6	2	4	449	497	−48	8		55–86	76–77	—	91–93
4	(Israel) Hapoel Haifa	6	2	4	452	468	−16	8		59–66	81–71	64–74	—

Source: Second Round Standings
Legend: Blue = home team win; Red = away team win.

=== Group K ===
Pos	Team	Pld	W	L	PF	PA	PD	Pts	Qualification	GAZ	KAL	CRA	HDB
1	(Turkey) Gaziantep	6	6	0	546	449	+97	12	Advance to quarter-finals	—	77–62	105–87	93–72
2	(Estonia) Kalev/Cramo	6	3	3	446	472	−26	9	Advance to quarter-finals	70–92	—	90–78	73–63
3	(Germany) Hakro Merlins Crailsheim	6	2	4	527	552	−25	8		95–97	76–79	—	89–84
4	(Netherlands) Heroes Den Bosch	6	1	5	465	511	−46	7		63–82	86–72	97–102	—

Source: Second Round Standings
Legend: Blue = home team win; Red = away team win.

=== Group L ===
Pos	Team	Pld	W	L	PF	PA	PD	Pts	Qualification	BRO	ANW	ORA	KER
1	(Germany) Brose Bamberg	6	4	2	506	477	+29	10	Advance to quarter-finals	—	73–69	80–82	89–58
2	(Poland) Anwil Włocławek	6	4	2	490	430	+60	10	Advance to quarter-finals	86–90	—	74–66	92–63
3	(Romania) CSM Oradea	6	3	3	484	478	+6	9		95–84	73–91	—	93–72
4	(Cyprus) Keravnos	6	1	5	422	517	−95	7		87–90	65–78	77–75	—

Source: Second Round Standings
Legend: Blue = home team win; Red = away team win.

== Play-offs ==
The play-offs began on 6 March and concluded on 19 and 26 April 2023 with the 2023 FIBA Europe Cup Finals.

Quarter-finals; 6–8 & 14–15 March
(Ukraine) Budivelnyk	73	79	152
(France) Cholet	72	83	155
(Estonia) Kalev/Cramo	80	85	165
(Germany) Brose Bamberg	77	67	144
(Portugal) FC Porto	80	65	145
(Finland) Karhu	81	75	156
(Poland) Anwil Włocławek	84	91	175
(Turkey) Gaziantep	85	75	160

Semi-finals; 29 March & 5 April
(France) Cholet	73	81	154
(Estonia) Kalev/Cramo	80	59	139
(Finland) Karhu	71	63	134
(Poland) Anwil Włocławek	90	67	157

Finals; 19 & 26 April
(France) Cholet	77	78	155
(Poland) Anwil Włocławek	81	80	161

=== Quarter-finals ===
The first legs were played on 6–8 March, and the second legs were played on 14–15 March 2023.

Team 1	Agg.	Team 2	1st leg	2nd leg
Budivelnyk (Ukraine)	152–155	(France) Cholet	73–72	79–83
FC Porto (Portugal)	145–156	(Finland) Karhu	80–81	65–75
Anwil Włocławek (Poland)	175–160	(Turkey) Gaziantep	84–85	91–75
Kalev/Cramo (Estonia)	165–144	(Germany) Brose Bamberg	80–77	85–67

=== Semi-finals ===
The first legs were played on 29 March, and the second legs were played on 5 April 2023.

Team 1	Agg.	Team 2	1st leg	2nd leg
Kalev/Cramo (Estonia)	139–154	(France) Cholet	80–73	59–81
Anwil Włocławek (Poland)	157–134	(Finland) Karhu	90–71	67–63

=== Finals ===
The first leg was played on 19 April, and the second leg was played on 26 April 2023.

Team 1	Agg.	Team 2	1st leg	2nd leg
Anwil Włocławek (Poland)	161–155	(France) Cholet	81–77	80–78

== Individual awards ==
=== FIBA Europe Cup Final MVP ===
Player	Team	Ref.
(United States) Phil Greene	(Poland) Anwil Włocławek	

=== MVP of the Month ===
Month	Player	Club	Ref.
2022
October	(United States) Ousman Krubally	(Cyprus) Keravnos	
November	(Slovenia) Miha Lapornik	(Slovakia) Patrioti Levice	
December	(United States) Conner Frankamp	(Turkey) Gaziantep	
2023
January	(Canada) Olivier Hanlan	(Turkey) Gaziantep	
February	(Bulgaria) Codi Miller-McIntyre	(Turkey) Gaziantep	
March	(Estonia) Artur Konontšuk	(Estonia) Kalev/Cramo	

== See also ==
- 2022–23 EuroLeague
- 2022–23 EuroCup Basketball
- 2022–23 Basketball Champions League
