= Boris Dallo =

French basketball player (born 1994)

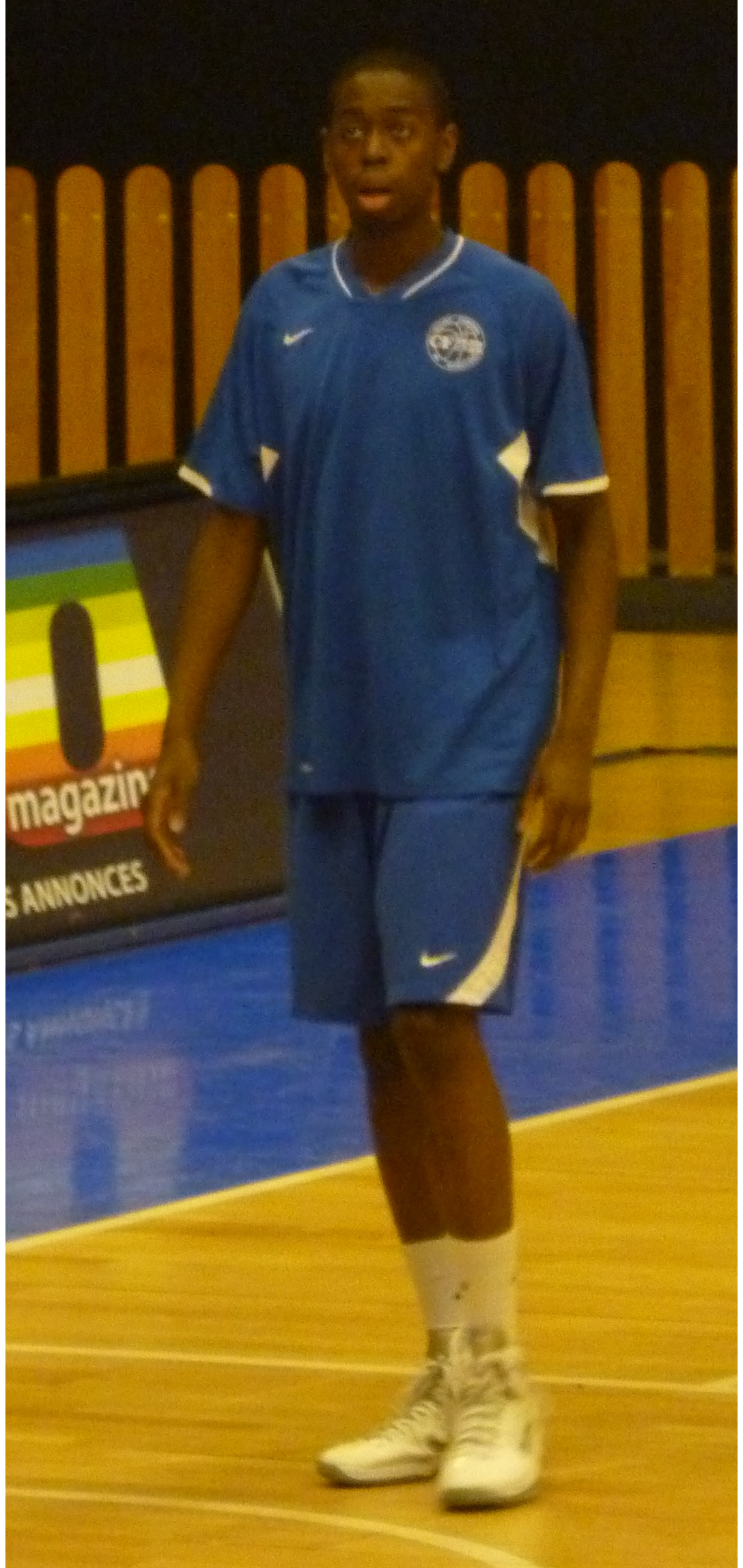
- Dallo with CFBB in 2012

Al-Ittihad Aleppo
- Position: Small forward / Shooting guard
- League: Syrian Basketball League

Personal information
- Born: 12 March 1994 (age 32) Nantes, France
- Listed height: 6 ft 5 in (1.96 m)
- Listed weight: 210 lb (95 kg)

Career information
- High school: INSEP (Paris, France)
- NBA draft: 2016: undrafted
- Playing career: 2012–present

Career history
- 2012–2013: Poitiers
- 2013–2015: Partizan
- 2015–2016: Olympique Antibes
- 2016–2017: Long Island Nets
- 2017–2018: Panionios
- 2018–2019: Aris
- 2019–2020: SIG Strasbourg
- 2020–2021: ESSM Le Portel
- 2021–2023: Cholet Basket
- 2023–2024: ASVEL
- 2025: Real Betis
- 2025: Saint-Quentin
- 2026–present: Al-Ittihad Aleppo

Career highlights
- Serbian League champion (2014)

Boris Omer Dallo (born 12 March 1994) is a French professional basketball player for Al-Ittihad Aleppo of the Syrian Basketball League. He was one of the many young French basketball talents, who were trained at INSEP.

== Early life and youth career ==
Dallo was born in Nantes on 12 March 1994. He began his youth club career at the age of five, playing for Hermine Nantes, before making the move to INSEP academy when he was 15, from 2009 to 2012.

== Professional career ==
Dallo attended the National Institute of Sport and Physical Education (INSEP).

=== Poitiers (2012–2013) ===
Dallo signed a two-year deal with Poitiers Basket 86 of the LNB Pro A. He made his professional debut in the 2012–13 season.

=== KK Partizan (2013–2015) ===
In August 2013, Dallo signed a four-year contract with the Serbian club Partizan Belgrade. In his first season with Partizan, he won the Basketball League of Serbia defeating Crvena zvezda with 3–1 in the final series. After the end of the 2014–15 season, he parted ways with Partizan.

=== 2015–2017 ===
In July 2015, Dallo returned to France, and signed a two-year deal with Olympique Antibes.

On 1 November 2016, Dallo was acquired by the Long Island Nets of the NBA Development League.

=== Panionios (2017–2018) ===
On 16 October 2017, Dallo joined Panionios in the Greek Basket League. In 22 games he finished the 2017–2018 season averaging 7.5 points, 7.3 rebounds, 3,2 assists and 12,3 index in 27 minutes. He was the third best rebounder of the league and the top rebounder of his team.

=== Aris (2018–2019) ===
On 28 June 2018, Dallo joined Aris in the Greek Basket League.

=== SIG Strasbourg (2019–2020) ===
On 5 August 2019, Dallo signed with SIG Strasbourg of the Pro A.

=== Le Portel (2020–2021) ===
On 28 May 2020, Dallo signed with ESSM Le Portel of the LNB Pro A.

=== Cholet Basket (2021–2023) ===
On 31 August 2021, Dallo signed with Cholet Basket of the LNB Pro A.

=== ASVEL Basket (2023–2024) ===
On 3 July 2023, Dallo signed with ASVEL Basket of the LNB Pro A and the EuroLeague. On 22 February 2024 he parted ways with the club.

=== Real Betis Baloncesto (2025–present) ===
On 25 March 2025 he signed with Real Betis Baloncesto of the LEB Oro.

== National team career ==
Dallo represents France internationally. He was selected for the U16 Eurobasket in 2009 and 2010, for the U18 Eurobasket in 2011 and 2012, and for the U20 Eurobasket in 2013 and 2014.

== Career statistics ==
Legend
| GP | Games played | GS | Games started | MPG | Minutes per game |
| FG% | Field-goal percentage | 3P% | 3-point field-goal percentage | FT% | Free-throw percentage |
| RPG | Rebounds per game | APG | Assists per game | SPG | Steals per game |
| BPG | Blocks per game | PPG | Points per game | PIR | Performance index rating |
| **Bold** | Career high |

=== EuroLeague ===
| Year | Team | GP | GS | MPG | FG% | 3P% | FT% | RPG | APG | SPG | BPG | PPG | PIR |
|---|---|---|---|---|---|---|---|---|---|---|---|---|---|
| 2013–14 | Partizan | **22** | 0 | **9.0** | **.324** | **.200** | .000 | **1.0** | **.8** | **.2** | .0 | **1.1** | **0.7** |
| 2023–24 | ASVEL | 3 | 0 | 4.3 | .000 | .000 | — | .3 | .7 | — | — | — | -2.7 |
| Career | | 25 | 0 | 8.5 | .300 | .143 | .000 | .9 | .8 | .2 | .0 | 1.0 | 0.3 |
