= La Meilleraie =

Indoor sporting arena in Cholet, France

Coordinates: 47.057945°N 0.896373°W

Le Meilleraie
- La Salle de la Meilleraie
- Le Hangar
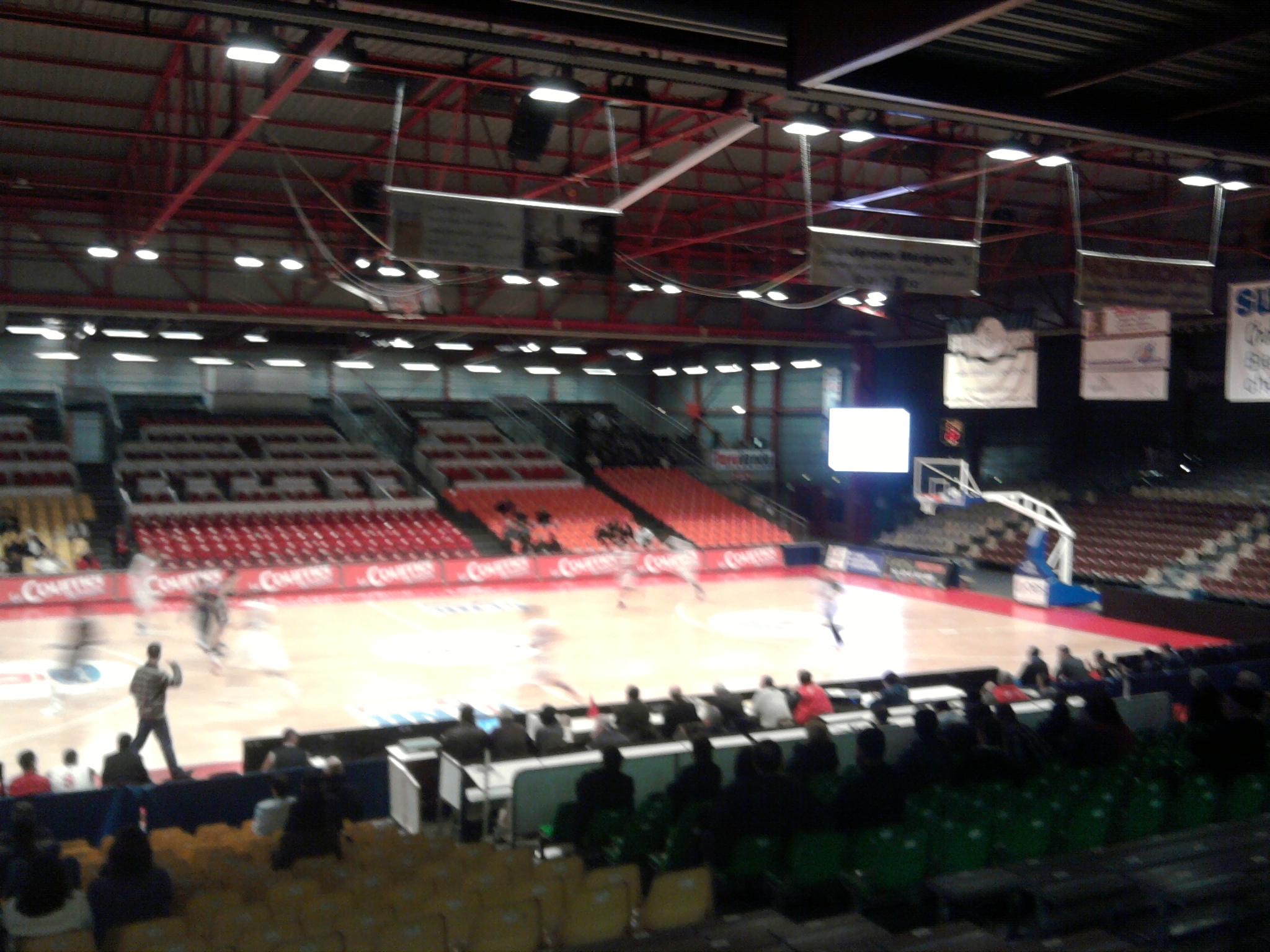
- Interactive map of Le Meilleraie
- Location: Cholet, France
- Capacity: 5,191 (Basketball)

Construction
- Opened: 1987
- Renovated: 2009

Tenant
- Cholet Basket (LNB Pro A) (1987-present)

La Meilleraie (French pronunciation: [la mɛjʁɛ]) is an indoor sporting arena located in the city of Cholet, Maine-et-Loire, France. The arena is part of a larger expo and events center called Le Parc des Expositions de la Meilleraie, which is divided into several sections. The sports arena constitutes the "Red Zone" of the complex.

The capacity of the arena is 5,191 people. It is currently home to the Cholet Basket basketball team. The building opened in 1987 and was renovated in 2009 at a cost of €250,000.
