= Dominic Artis =

American basketball player (born 1993)

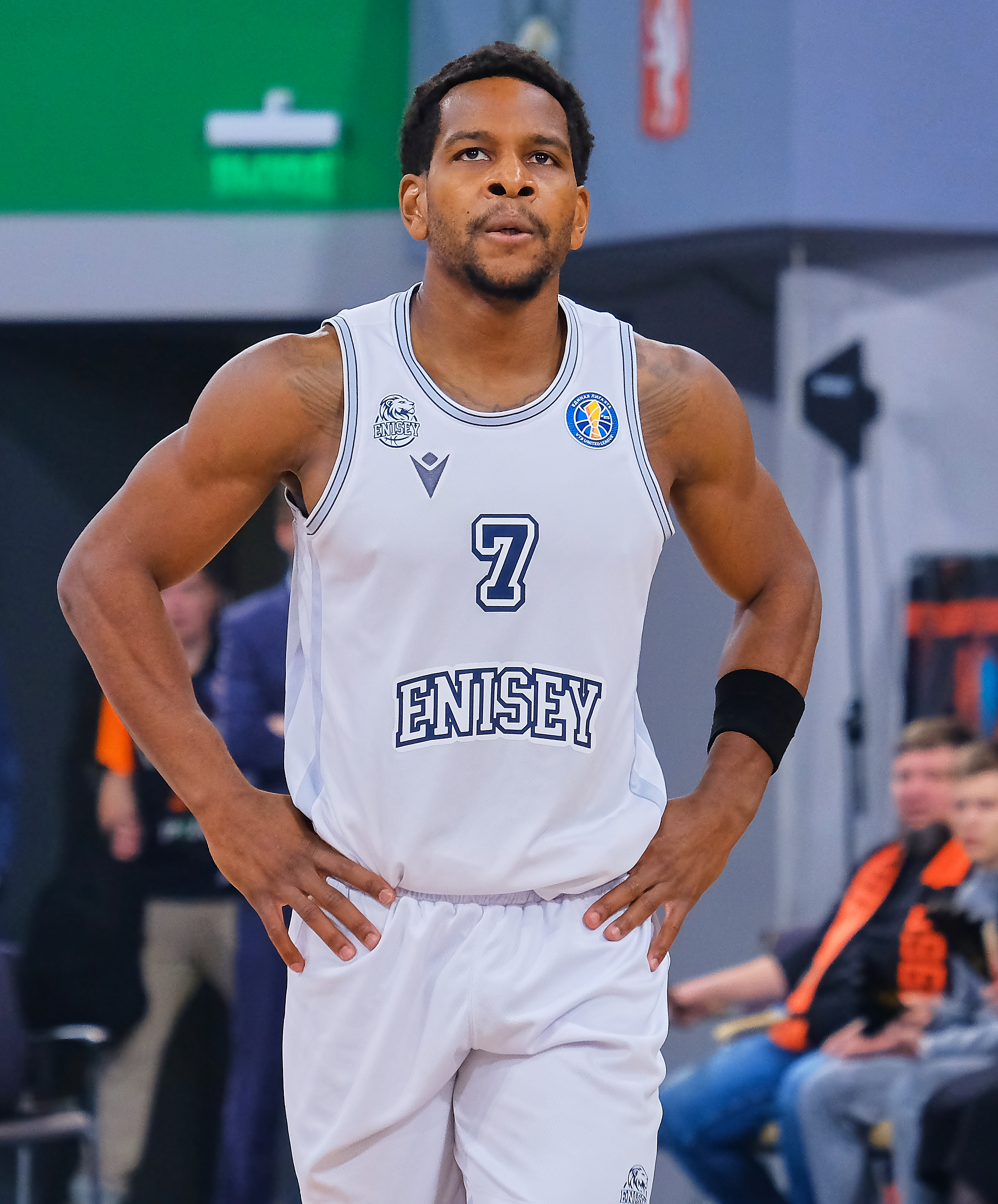
- Artis with BC Enisey in 2026

No. 7 – Peja
- Position: Point guard
- League: Kosovo Basketball Superleague

Personal information
- Born: July 7, 1993 (age 33) San Francisco, California, U.S.
- Listed height: 6 ft 3 in (1.91 m)
- Listed weight: 190 lb (86 kg)

Career information
- High school: Findlay Prep (Henderson, Nevada)
- College: Oregon (2012–2014); UTEP (2015–2017)
- NBA draft: 2017: undrafted
- Playing career: 2017–present

Career history
- 2017–2018: Czarni Słupsk
- 2018: Igokea
- 2018–2019: VL Pesaro
- 2019–2020: Dąbrowa Górnicza
- 2020: Cedevita Olimpija
- 2020–2021: Kolossos Rodou
- 2021–2023: Cholet Basket
- 2023–2024: Çağdaş Bodrumspor
- 2024–2025: SIG Strasbourg
- 2025–2026: Enisey
- 2026: Club Antonin Sportif
- 2026–present: Peja

Career highlights
- Bosnian Cup winner (2018); Second-team All-Conference USA (2017)

Dominic Jordan Artis (born July 7, 1993) is an American-born Kosovan professional basketball player for Peja of the Kosovo Basketball Superleague. He played college basketball for the Oregon Ducks and UTEP Miners.

== College career ==
Artis played NCAA Division I college basketball at the University of Oregon, with the Oregon Ducks, from 2012 to 2014. After his sophomore season, he and teammates Damyean Dotson and Brandon Austin were dismissed due to sexual assault allegations. The Lane County District Attorney did not charge them with a crime due to a lack of evidence and conflicting statements made by the alleged victim. He then played college basketball at the University of Texas at El Paso, with the UTEP Miners, from 2015 to 2017. As a senior, he averaged 15.0 points and 6.5 rebounds per game and was named to the Second-team All-Conference USA.

== Professional career ==
On August 10, 2017, Artis signed with Czarni Słupsk of the Polish Basketball League. On January 10, 2018, he parted ways with Czarni Słupsk after averaging 15.2 points, 5.1 rebounds and 6.1 assists per game. Two days later he signed with Igokea for the rest of the 2017–18 season. He averaged 13 points and 5 assists per game. On August 3, 2018, Artis signed with VL Pesaro. On August 19, 2019, he has signed with Dąbrowa Górnicza of the Polish Basketball League.

On January 30, 2020, he signed with Cedevita Olimpija of the Premier A Slovenian Basketball League. In May 2020, Cedevita Olimpija parted ways with him.

On August 14, 2020, Artis moved to Greece and signed with Kolossos Rodou. He averaged 14.4 points, 5.5 assists, 4.8 rebounds, and 1.6 steals in the Greek Basket League.

On July 25, 2021, Artis signed with Cholet Basket of the LNB Pro A.

On July 6, 2023, Artis signed with Çağdaş Bodrumspor of the Basketbol Süper Ligi.

On July 4, 2024, he signed with SIG Strasbourg of the French LNB Pro A.

== National team career ==
Artis is a naturalized Kosovan basketball player since 2023.
