= List of people with given name Thomas =

People with given name Thomas

This article lists notable people with the given name Thomas.

- Thomas à Beckett (judge) (1836–1919), Australian solicitor and judge
- Thomas Boylston Adams (1772–1832), Massachusetts legislator and judge and brother of John Quincy Adams
- Thomas Boylston Adams (1910–1997), Massachusetts executive, writer, and political candidate
- Thomas Amarasuriya (1907–1979), Sri Lankan planter and politician
- Thomas Anders (born 1963) German singer, songwriter and record producer
- Thomas Andrew (photographer) (1855–1939), New Zealand photographer who lived in Samoa from 1891
- Thomas Andrews (1873–1912), British businessman and shipbuilder
- Thomas of Ashborne, English controversialist
- Thomas Austin (pastoralist) (1815–1871), English settler in Australia who introduced rabbits into Australia in 1859
- Thomas Audley, 1st Baron Audley of Walden (c.1488 – 1544), English barrister and judge, Lord Chancellor
- Thomas H. Bak (born 1961), Polish-British cognitive neuroscientist
- Thomas Baker (artist) (1809–1864), English landscape painter and watercolourist
- Thomas Bangalter (born 1975), French DJ and member of Daft Punk
- Thomas Bardwell (1704–1767), English portrait and figure painter, art copyist, and writer
- Thomas Barnsley (1919–1992), British businessman
- Thomas Baumert (born 1965), German-French physician-scientist and entrepreneur
- Thomas Becket, Archbishop of Canterbury from 1162 until his murder in 1170
- Thomas Bertrand-Hudon (born 1996), Canadian football player
- Thomas Binger, American lawyer
- Thomas G. Blomberg, American criminologist
- Thomas Boylston (1644–1695), early-American doctor and patriarch of the influential Boylston family of Massachusetts
- Thomas Blake Glover, Scottish merchant in Japan in the Bakumatsu and Meiji eras
- Thomas Blumenfeld (born 1997), Canadian boxer
- Thomas Bourchier (cardinal) (c.1411 – 1486), English cardinal and Lord Chancellor
- Thomas Brodie-Sangster (born 1990), English actor
- Thomas J. Brown, multiple people
- Thomas Brugis, English surgeon
- Thomas Bunday (1948–1983), American serial killer
- Thomas Bussard (born 2002), Swiss ski mountaineer
- Tom Calma (born 1953), Australian First Nations human rights and social justice campaigner
- Thomas de Cantilupe (c. 1218–1282), Lord Chancellor of England and Bishop of Hereford
- Thomas Cardozo (1838–1881), American educator, politician, and journalist
- Thomas Carlyle (1795–1881), Scottish essayist, historian, and philosopher
- Thomas Carroll (hurler) (born 1992), Irish hurler
- Thomas Carroll (martial artist) (1938–1999), American karate artist
- Thomas Carroll (pilot) (1890–1975), American test pilot
- Thomas Child (1841–1898), English photographer and engineer
- Thomas Cheeseman (1845–1923), New Zealand botanist
- Thomas Haden Church (born 1960), American actor
- Thomas J. Clayton (1826–1900), American lawyer and judge
- Thomas Sean Connery (1930–2020), Scottish actor
- Thomas Cook (1808–1892), English businessman
- Thomas Butler Cooper, American politician and lawyer
- Thomas Joshua Cooper (born 1946), American photographer
- Thomas Cooray (1901–1988), first Sri Lankan cardinal, Archbishop of Colombo, 1947–1976
- Thomas Cornell (artist) (1937–2012), American artist
- Thomas Cromwell (1485–1540), English lawyer and statesman who served as chief minister to King Henry VIII
- Thomas Mewburn Crook (1869-1949), English sculptor
- Thomas Crooks (disambiguation), multiple people
- Thomas Crotty (1912–1942), American Coast Guardsman held as POW during World War II
- Thomas "Tom" Cruise (born 1962), American actor and film producer
- Thomas Dafydd, Welsh elegist and hymn writer
- Thomas D'Alesandro Jr. (1903–1987), American politician
- Thomas D'Alesandro III (1929–2019), American attorney and politician
- Thomas Dang (born 1995), Canadian politician
- Thomas Cullen Davis, American former oil tycoon
- Thomas Delaney (born 1991), Danish professional footballer
- Chris Thomas Devlin, American screenwriter
- Thomas Roderick Dew (1802–1846), American professor and president of The College of William & Mary, influential pro-slavery advocate
- Thomas E. Dewey (1902–1971), American lawyer and politician
- Thomas Dolby (born 1958), English musician, producer, composer, entrepreneur and teacher
- Thomas Dörflein (1963–2008), German zookeeper
- Thomas Doughty (artist) (1793–1856), American artist associated with the Hudson River School
- Thomas Drouet (born 1998), French racing driver
- Thomas Dutronc (born 1973) French singer and jazz manouche guitarist
- Sir Thomas Dyke Acland, 12th Baronet (1842–1919), British politician
- Thomas M. Eastwick (born 1952), American educator and philanthropist
- Thomas Edison (1847–1931), American inventor and businessman
- Thomas Edwards (artist) (1795–1869), American artist in 19th-century Boston, Massachusetts, specializing in portraits
- Thomas Enqvist (born 1974), Swedish professional tennis player
- Thomas "Tom" Felton (born 1987), English actor
- Thomas Fidone (born 2002), American football player
- Thomas Leigh Gatch (1891–1954), American naval officer and attorney
- Thomas Milton Gatch (1833–1913), American educator and politician
- Thomas S. Gathright (1829–1880), American educator and masonic leader
- Thomas Gibson (artist) (c.1680–1751), English portrait painter and copyist
- Thomas Gilman (disambiguation)
- Thomas Godfrey (disambiguation), multiple people
- Thomas Gooch (artist) (1750–1802), English artist who specialised in painting animals
- Thomas Gottschalk (born 1950), German TV host and actor
- Thomas Gottstein (born 1964), Swiss banker, CEO of Credit Suisse
- Thomas Graves (disambiguation), multiple people
- Thomas R. Gray (1800–1845), American attorney, diplomat, and author
- Thomas Green (disambiguation), multiple people
- Thomas Ian Griffith (born 1962), American actor, screenwriter, producer, musician, and martial artist
- Thomas Hagedorn (born 1971), German entrepreneur
- Thomas "Tom" Hanks (born 1956), American actor and filmmaker
- Thomas Blom Hansen (born 1958), Danish anthropologist
- Thomas Hearne (artist) (1744–1817), English landscape painter, engraver and illustrator
- Thomas Hearns (born 1958), American professional boxer
- Thomas "Tom" Hiddleston (born 1981), English actor
- Thomas Lawrence Higgins (1950–1994), American writer and gay rights activist
- Thomas Higham (artist) (1795–1844), English artist specialising in an antiquary and topographical engravings
- Thomas Heffernan Ho (born 1989), Hong Kong equestrian
- Thomas Ho (disambiguation), multiple people
- Thomas Hobbes (1588–1679), English philosopher
- Thomas Hogan (artist) (1955–2014), Canadian First Nations artist
- Thomas "Tom" Holland (born 1996), English actor
- Thomas Horton (soldier) (1603–1649), English general and judge
- Thomas Howard, 1st Earl of Suffolk (1561–1626)
- Thomas Howard, 4th Duke of Norfolk (died 1572)
- Thomas Iser (born 1987), French-Luxembourgian street artist, photographer and painter
- Thomas Jackson (1807–1878), American abolitionist
- Thomas Jane (born 1969), American actor
- Thomas Jefferson (1743–1826), founding father and the third President of the United States
- Thomas Jones (disambiguation), multiple people, including:
  - Thomas "Tom" Jones (born 1940), Welsh singer
- Thomas V. Julien (1838–1906), justice of the Supreme Court of Nevada
- Thomas Kelly-Kenny, British general
- Thomas à Kempis (1380–1471), German-Dutch Catholic canon regular and author
- Thomas Keneally (born 1935), Australian novelist, playwright, essayist, and actor
- Thomas Kerr (Scottish politician) (born 1996), Scottish politician
- Thomas Kinn (born 1999), Norwegian footballer
- Thomas Kittera (1789–1839), American politician
- Thomas Kretschmann (born 1962), German actor
- Thomas Ladzinski (born 1989), German politician
- Thomas Lahdensuo (born 2005), Finnish footballer
- Thomas Lam (born 1993), Finnish-Dutch footballer
- Thomas Lærke (born 1991), Danish basketballer
- Thomas Lavigne, American politician
- Thomas Law (disambiguation), multiple people
- Thomas "Tommy" Lee, American musician
- Thomas Leiper (1745–1825), Scottish-American businessman, banker and politician
- Thomas Lembong (born 1971), Indonesian politician
- Thomas Lennon (born 1970) American actor, comedian, screenwriter, producer, director, and novelist
- Thomas Limpinsel (born 1965), German actor
- Thomas Lincoln (1778–1851), father of Abraham Lincoln
- Thomas Lincoln, Jr., brother of Abraham Lincoln
- Thomas "Tad" Lincoln III (1853–1871), fourth son of Abraham Lincoln, whose nickname is Tad
- Thomas Lodu, South Sudanese politician
- Thomas Babington Macaulay (1800-1859), British historian, poet, and Whig politician
- Thomas R. Marshall (1854–1925), American politician who served as the 28th vice president of the United States from 1913 to 1921
- Thomas Massie (born 1971), United States Congressman from Kentucky and engineer
- Thomas J. Mastin (1839–1861), Confederate captain and lawyer
- Thomas Mathews (1676–1751), British officer of the Royal Navy, who rose to the rank of admiral
- Thomas N. McClellan (1853–1906), associate justice and chief justice of the Supreme Court of Alabama
- Thomas "Tom" McClintock (born 1956), American politician and U.S. Representative for California's 4th congressional district
- Thomas W. Merrill (born 1949), American legal scholar
- Thomas F. Metz (born 1948), lieutenant general in the United States Army
- Thomas Meunier (born 1991), Belgian professional footballer
- Thomas More (1478–1535), English lawyer, social philosopher, author, statesman, and Renaissance humanist
- Thomas Müller (born 1989), German footballer
- Thomas Muster (born 1967), Austrian tennis player
- Thomas Nadalini (born 2002), Italian short track speed skater
- Thomas Newson (born 1994), Dutch DJ and electronic music producer
- Thomas Nihlén (born 1953), Swedish politician
- Thomas Nordahl (born 1946), Swedish soccer player
- Thomas Noret (born 1946), American politician
- Thomas Oates (disambiguation), multiple people
- Thomas Lehne Olsen (born 1991), Norwegian footballer
- Thomas Kaan Önol Lang (born 2007), Turkish akpine ski racer
- Thomas Burton O'Connor (1914–1952), American journalist & editor
- Thomas Okos (born 1988), German politician
- Thomas Oppel (born 1953), American politician
- Thomas O'Regan (1956–2020), Australian academic
- Thomas Orbos, Filipino businessman, government administrator, and politician
- Thomas Owden (1808–1899), British businessman, lord mayor of London.
- Thomas Owen (Launceston MP) (1840–1898), British politician
- Thomas Paine (1737–1809), American philosopher and political activist
- Thomas Palaiologos (1409–1465), Despot of the Morea and brother of Constantine XI, the last Byzantine emperor
- Thomas Papadopoulos, Greek footballer
- Tom Pashby (1915–2005), Canadian ophthalmologist and sport safety advocate
- Thomas Paxton (1820–1887), Canadian industrial businessman and politician
- Thomas Payne (disambiguation), multiple people
- Thomas Pelham-Holles, 1st Duke of Newcastle (1693–1768), Prime Minister of Great Britain
- Thomas Pestock (born 1984), American professional wrestler known by his ring name Baron Corbin
- Thomas "Tom" Petty (1950–2017), American singer-songwriter and musician
- Thomas Quasthoff (born 1959), German opera singer
- Thomas De Quincey (1785–1859), English essayist
- Thomas Ragnarsson (born 1970), Swedish politician
- Thomas Randolph (ambassador) (1523–1590), English diplomat and politician
- Thomas Randolph of Tuckahoe (1683–1729), Virginia politician
- Thomas Randolph (academic) (1701–1783), Vice-Chancellor of Oxford University
- Thomas Randolph, 1st Earl of Moray (died 1332), nephew and companion-in-arms of King Robert the Bruce
- Thomas Randolph, 2nd Earl of Moray (died 1332), son of the 1st Earl of Moray
- Thomas Beverly Randolph (1793–1867), American military officer
- Thomas Jefferson Randolph (1792–1875), grandson of Thomas Jefferson
- Thomas Robert Malthus (1766–1834), English economist, cleric, and scholar
- Thomas Mann Randolph Sr. (1741–1793), father of Thomas Mann Randolph Jr.
- Thomas Mann Randolph Jr. (1768–1828), son-in law of Thomas Jefferson
- Thomas Rankine (born 1978), American musician
- Thomas Buchanan Read (1822–1872), American poet and painter
- Thomas Rettenegger (born 2000), Austrian Nordic combined skier
- Thomas Reynolds (Australian politician) (1818–1875), fifth Premier of South Australia
- Thomas J. Reynolds (1854-1896), American lawyer and politician
- Thomas Rhett (born 1990), American country singer-songwriter
- Thomas "TomSka" Ridgewell (born 1990), British YouTuber
- Thomas Robbins (disambiguation), multiple people
- Thomas Rohden (born 1996), Danish politician
- Thomas Roma (formerly Thomas Germano; born 1950), American photographer
- Thomas Ruff (born 1958), German photographer
- Thomas Ryan (artist) (1929–2021), Irish artist, designer and medallist
- Thomas Sadoski (born 1976), American actor
- Thomas de Sampayo (1855–1927), Sri Lankan judge
- Thomas Savundaranayagam (born 1938), Sri Lankan Tamil Roman Catholic priest, Bishop of Jaffna from 1992–2015
- Thomas Scott (entertainer), British educational YouTuber, game show host, and web developer
- Thomas Schmirander (born 1977), German politician
- Thomas Schulze (born 1964), German civil servant, restaurateur and politician
- Thomas Setodji (born 1995), French-Togolese tennis player
- Thomas Seymour, (1508–1549), 1st Baron Seymour of Sudeley
- Thomas Sharkey (1871–1953), American boxer
- Thomas Sheraton (1751–1806), English furniture designer
- Thomas Schubert (born 1993), Austrian actor
- Thomas Simons (born 2004), British YouTuber and Twitch streamer known online as TommyInnit
- Thomas Sirk (born 1993), American football player
- Thomas "Tom" Sizemore Jr. (1961–2023), American actor
- Thomas Smythe (artist) (1825–1906), English artist who painted landscapes, bucolic scenes and animals
- Thomas Sowell (born 1930), American economist, social philosopher, and political commentator
- Thomas Stavngaard (born 1974), Danish badminton player
- Thomas Steinbeck (1944–2016), American screenwriter, photographer, and journalist
- Thomas Strand (born 1954), Swedish politician
- Thomas Sully (1783-1872), American painter
- Thomas Sutcliffe (artist) (1828–1871), English watercolour painter
- Thomas Sutherland (cricketer) (1880-19??), English first-class cricketer
- Thomas Sutton (1819–1875), English photographer, author, and inventor
- Thomas Sydeski (born 1994), American football coach
- Thomas Tesche (born 1978), German badminton player
- Thomas Thumm (born 1977), German politician
- Thomas Trauttmann (born 1991), French basketball player
- Thomas Tuchel (born 1973), German football coach
- Thomas S. Vandal (1960–2018), American military officer
- Thomas Vermaelen (born 1985), Belgian professional footballer
- Thomas Vicary (c. 1490–1561), English physician, surgeon, and anatomist
- Thomas Wakefeld (died 1575), English academic
- Thomas Wedgwood (1771–1805), English photographer and inventor
- Thomas Wilson (disambiguation), multiple people
- Thomas Wolfe (1900–1938), American novelist
- Thomas Wolsey (1473–1530), English archbishop, statesman and a cardinal of the Catholic Church
- Thomas Wulfes (born 1998), German politician
- Thomas Joseph Wynne (1838–1893), American–Irish photographer and shopkeeper
- Thomas Yassmin, Australian-American football player
- Thomas Edward Yorke (born 1968), English musician and the main vocalist and songwriter of the rock band Radiohead
- Thomas Young (disambiguation), multiple people

== Fictional characters ==
- Thomas the Tank Engine, the main protagonist of Thomas & Friends
- Thomas "Tommy" Carcetti, a character from The Wire
- Thomas Magnum, the main protagonist of Magnum, P.I.
- Thomas Hauk, a character from The Wire
- Thomas "Tom" Sawyer, the title character of the 1876 novel The Adventures of Tom Sawyer
- Thomas Shelby, the main protagonist of Peaky Blinders
- Thomas "Tom" Buchanan, a character from the 1925 novel The Great Gatsby
- Thomas Wayne, the deceased father of Batman
- Thomas "Tom" Haverford, a character from Parks and Recreation
- Thomas "Tom" Paris, a character from Star Trek: Voyager
- Thomas "Tom" Hagen, a character from The Godfather films

== See also ==
- Thomas (name)
- Tomasz
- Tom (given name)
- Tommie
- Tommy (given name)
