= EuroBasket 2015 qualification =

This article describes the qualification procedure for EuroBasket 2015.

== Qualification format ==
In the first qualifying round, 13 teams which didn't qualify for EuroBasket 2013 have been divided into four groups. The winners of each group advance to the knockout stage, composed by two semifinals and one final series under a home-and-away format.

The champion of the first qualifying round qualifies directly for EuroBasket 2015, while the rest of the teams join 14 EuroBasket 2013 teams which did not qualify directly for the 2015 edition in the second qualifying round.

== First round ==
13 teams played in the first qualifying round during the middle of 2013.

Denmark returned to the competition for the first time since 2010, while Azerbaijan, Albania and Cyprus did not take part in this edition after playing in the qualifying round in 2012.

=== Seedings ===
Pot 1	Pot 2	Pot 3	Pot 4
Estonia; Bulgaria; Austria; Hungary	Switzerland; Netherlands; Belarus; Romania	Iceland; Slovakia; Portugal; Luxembourg	Denmark

Group A	Group B	Group C	Group D
Bulgaria; Romania; Iceland	Estonia; Netherlands; Portugal	Austria; Switzerland; Luxembourg; Denmark	Hungary; Belarus; Slovakia

=== Group stage ===
Key to colors
Top placed team in each group advanced to the semifinals

All times are local.

==== Group A ====
Team	Pld	W	L	PF	PA	PD	Pts
Bulgaria	4	3	1	327	283	+44	7
Iceland	4	2	2	287	304	−17	6
Romania	4	1	3	280	307	−27	5

1 August 2013
17:45

Boxscore

Romania	68–84	Bulgaria
Scoring by quarter: 21–20, 19–22, 11–18, 17–24
Pts: Mandache 18; Rebs: Țibîrnă 5 Asts: Tudor 5		Pts: Ivanov 27; Rebs: Ivanov 8 Asts: Mirković 6

Sala Sporturilor Constanţa, Constanta
Attendance: 1,000
Referees: Milivoje Jovcic (SRB), Gianluca Mattioli (ITA), Tomislav Hordov (CRO)

4 August 2013
19:10

Boxscore

Bulgaria	88–59	Iceland
Scoring by quarter: 23–13, 21–15, 21–12, 23–19
Pts: Lilov 14; Rebs: Ivanov 13; Asts: Ivanov 5		Pts: Sigurðarson 19; Rebs: Ermolinskij 10; Asts: Ermolinskij 4

Palace of Culture and Sports, Varna
Attendance: 2,200
Referees: Dragan Neskovic (SRB), Petar Denkovski (MKD), Josip Radojkovic (CRO)

7 August 2013
18:00

Boxscore

Romania	64–72	Iceland
Scoring by quarter: 10–25, 18–13, 17–18, 19–16
Pts: Nicoară 15; Rebs: Silvăşan 13; Asts: Mandache 7		Pts: Pálsson 24; Rebs: Bæringsson 10; Asts: Bæringsson 8

Sala Sporturilor Constanţa, Constanta
Attendance: 1,000
Referees: Neil Wilkinson (ENG), Christof Madinger (GER), Fedja Serhatlic (SWE)

10 August 2013
19:10

Boxscore

Bulgaria	74–77	Romania
Scoring by quarter: 19–20, 5–24, 27–16, 23–17
Pts: Mirković 26; Rebs: Ivanov 10; Asts: Mirković 5		Pts: Mandache 23; Rebs: Silvăşan 8 Asts: Tudor 11

Palace of Culture and Sports, Varna
Attendance: 2,000
Referees: Srdan Dozai (CRO), Marko Juras (SRB), Aleksandar Milojevic (MKD)

13 August 2013
19:15

Boxscore

Iceland	79–81	Bulgaria
Scoring by quarter: 20–17, 21–16, 14–27, 24–21
Pts: Stefánsson 32; Rebs: Bæringsson, Stefánsson 7 Asts: Ermolinskij, Sigurðarson 5		Pts: Ivanov 19; Rebs: Ivanov 14; Asts: Mirković 6

Laugardalshöll, Reykjavík
Attendance: 1,850
Referees: Eddie Viator (FRA), Moritz Reiter (GER), Robert Hickman (ENG)

16 August 2013
19:15

Boxscore

Iceland	77–71	Romania
Scoring by quarter: 22–13, 18–23, 21–24, 16–11
Pts: Sigurðarson 23; Rebs: Bæringsson 13; Asts: Pálsson 5		Pts: Gutoaia 19; Rebs: Nicoară 11; Asts: Tudor 6

Laugardalshöll, Reykjavík
Attendance: 1,200
Referees: Elias Koromilas (GRE), Robert Vyklicky (CZE), Moritz Reiter (GER)

==== Group B ====
Team	Pld	W	L	PF	PA	PD	Pts
Estonia	4	3	1	235	199	+36	7
Portugal	4	2	2	209	222	−13	6
Netherlands	4	1	3	134	157	–23	3

1 August 2013
20:00

Boxscore

Netherlands	0–20^{1}	Estonia

Maaspoort Sports end Events, 's-Hertogenbosch
Attendance: 1,000
Referees: Joseph Bissang (FRA), Moritz Reiter (GER), Keith Williams (ENG)

4 August 2013
20:00

Boxscore

Estonia	66–72	Portugal
Scoring by quarter: 22–23, 8–20, 14–17, 22–12
Pts: Arbet 20; Rebs: Talts 13; Asts: Sokk 8		Pts: Andrade 16; Rebs: Fernandes 7 Asts: Fernandes 6

Saku Suurhall Arena, Tallinn
Attendance: 2,000
Referees: Jakub Zamojski (POL), Jurgis Laurinavicius (LTU), Sergiy Zashchuk (UKR)

7 August 2013
20:00

Boxscore

Portugal	20–0^{1}	Netherlands

Pavilhao dos Desportos de Sines, Sines
Attendance: 1,100
Referees: Robert Lottermoser (GER), Francisco Araña (ESP), Roberto Chiari (ITA)

10 August 2013
20:00

Boxscore

Estonia	64–63	Netherlands
Scoring by quarter: 30–18, 14–12, 10–17, 10–16
Pts: Veideman 15; Rebs: Kangur 14; Asts: Sokk 4		Pts: de Jong 16; Rebs: de Jong 12; Asts: Cunningham 2

Saku Suurhall Arena, Tallinn
Attendance: 3,000
Referees: Anton Makhlin (RUS), Juris Kokainis (LAT), Fedja Serhatlic (SWE)

13 August 2013
20:00

Boxscore

Portugal	64–85	Estonia
Scoring by quarter: 16–29, 17–17, 14–22, 17–17
Pts: Fonseca 17; Rebs: Miranda, Fernandes 4 Asts: Fernandes 7		Pts: Veideman 18; Rebs: Talts 11; Asts: Sokk 5

Pavilhão Multiusos de Coimbra, Coimbra
Attendance: 1,000
Referees: Luigi Lamonica (ITA), Carlos Cortes (ESP), Nicolas Maestre (FRA)

16 August 2013
20:00

Boxscore

Netherlands	71–53	Portugal
Scoring by quarter: 14–13, 14–7, 24–13, 19–20
Pts: de Jong 17; Rebs: Osaikhwuwuomwam 10; Asts: de Jong, Cunningham 4		Pts: Gomes 10; Rebs: Andrade 6 Asts: Fernandes 3

Vijf Meihal, Leiden
Attendance: 1,500
Referees: Vicente Bulto, Tolga Sahin, Simon Unsworth

^{1}The Netherlands were voided of two wins for playing two naturalised players.

==== Group C ====
Team	Pld	W	L	PF	PA	PD	Pts
Switzerland	6	5	1	461	378	+83	11
Austria	6	5	1	535	445	+90	11
Denmark	6	2	4	400	430	−30	8
Luxembourg	6	0	6	378	521	−143	6

1 August 2013
16:00

Boxscore

Switzerland	78–37	Denmark
Scoring by quarter: 18–8, 26–13, 15–12, 19–4
Pts: D. Mladjan, M. Mladjan 13; Rebs: Capela 11; Asts: Kazadi 4		Pts: Iversen 13; Rebs: Iversen 5 Asts: five players 1

Site Sportif Saint-Leonard, Fribourg
Attendance: 480
Referees: Paolo Taurino (ITA), Clemens Fritz (GER), Jean-Charles Collin (FRA)

1 August 2013
20:20

Boxscore

Austria	111–77	Luxembourg
Scoring by quarter: 21–17, 28–18, 38–20, 24–22
Pts: Mahalbašić 21; Rebs: Mahalbašić 13; Asts: Klepeisz 6		Pts: Jones 22; Rebs: Picard, Genevo 6 Asts: Jones 3

Multiversum, Schwechat
Attendance: 700
Referees: Marko Vuckovic (SLO), Christof Madinger (GER), Nikola Perlic (CRO)

4 August 2013
15:15

Boxscore

Denmark	72–80	Austria
Scoring by quarter: 15–24, 15–22, 26–20, 16–14
Pts: Reinholt 25; Rebs: Bergstedt 10; Asts: Darbo, Nielsen 2		Pts: Mahalbašić 23; Rebs: Mahalbašić 10; Asts: Schreiner 7

Forum Horsens, Horsens
Attendance: 767
Referees: Petri Mäntylä (FIN), Ingus Baumanis (LAT), Konstantin Simonow (GER)

4 August 2013
16:30

Boxscore

Luxembourg	57–75	Switzerland
Scoring by quarter: 17–24, 10–21, 13–17, 17–13
Pts: Picard 18; Rebs: Picard 7 Asts: Ferreira 4		Pts: D. Mladjan 17; Rebs: Capela 9 Asts: Petković 4

d'Coque, Luxembourg
Attendance: 300
Referees: Sérgio Silva (POR), Regis Bardera (FRA), Georgios Poursanidis (GRE)

7 August 2013
19:00

Boxscore

Luxembourg	62–73	Denmark
Scoring by quarter: 19–21, 14–24, 14–13, 15–15
Pts: Picard 26; Rebs: Genevo 7 Asts: Jones 5		Pts: Reinholt 24; Rebs: Darbo 9 Asts: Plannthin 4

d'Coque, Luxembourg
Attendance: 300
Referees: David Chambon (FRA), Paulus Van Den Heuvel (NED), Mario Majkic (SLO)

7 August 2013
20:00

Boxscore

Switzerland	69–63	Austria
Scoring by quarter: 21–24, 16–13, 18–18, 14–8
Pts: Kazadi 19; Rebs: Capela 9 Asts: D. Mladjan, Petković 3		Pts: Mahalbašić 15; Rebs: Mahalbašić 7 Asts: Schreiner, Mahalbašić 2

Site Sportif Saint-Leonard, Fribourg
Attendance: 1,150
Referees: Marco Giansanti (ITA), Paul Unsworth (ENG), Antonio Zamora (AND)

10 August 2013
19:00

Boxscore

Luxembourg	65–98	Austria
Scoring by quarter: 18–22, 19–22, 13–29, 15–25
Pts: Picard 22; Rebs: Picard 7 Asts: Koster 7		Pts: Schreiner 20; Rebs: Mahalbašić 7 Asts: Schreiner, Mahalbašić 4

d'Coque, Luxembourg
Attendance: 150
Referees: Luis Lopes (POR), Nick Van den Broeck (BEL), Barry Peters (NED)

10 August 2013
19:15

Boxscore

Denmark	65–66	Switzerland
Scoring by quarter: 23–18, 13–17, 11–13, 18–18
Pts: Reinholt 16; Rebs: Bergstedt 6 Asts: Bak 4		Pts: D. Mladjan 26; Rebs: Capela 11; Asts: Petković 4

Forum Horsens, Horsens
Attendance: 766
Referees: Arnis Ozols (LAT), Henri Hilke (FIN), Mart Uuehendrik (EST)

13 August 2013
20:00

Boxscore

Switzerland	77–59	Luxembourg
Scoring by quarter: 17–11, 27–11, 9–15, 24–22
Pts: Kazadi 17; Rebs: Dubas 9 Asts: Mafuta, Kazadi 3		Pts: Picard 20; Rebs: Ferreira 5 Asts: Ferreira, Koster 3

Site Sportif Saint-Leonard, Fribourg
Attendance: 800
Referees: Guerrino Cerebuch (ITA), Tamas Benczur (HUN), Konstantin Simonow (GER)

13 August 2013
20:20

Boxscore

Austria	86–66	Denmark
Scoring by quarter: 16–21, 16–15, 30–16, 24–14
Pts: Mahalbašić 34; Rebs: Poiger 7 Asts: Mahalbašić 6		Pts: Bak 15; Rebs: Reinholt 9 Asts: seven players 1

Multiversum, Schwechat
Attendance: 600
Referees: Sinisa Herceg (CRO), Dragan Neskovic (SRB), Ognjen Jokic (MNE)

16 August 2013
15:00

Boxscore

Austria	97–96 (OT)	Switzerland
Scoring by quarter: 15–19, 15–21, 24–19, 24–19, Overtime: 19–18
Pts: Schreiner 22; Rebs: Lamesic 9 Asts: Klepeisz 4		Pts: D. Mladjan 31; Rebs: D. Mladjan 8 Asts: Kazadi 4

Multiversum, Schwechat
Attendance: 800
Referees: Matej Boltauzer (SLO), Tomislav Vovk (CRO), Petr Hrusa (CZE)

16 August 2013
19:15

Boxscore

Denmark	87–58	Luxembourg
Scoring by quarter: 19–13, 24–8, 19–11, 25–26
Pts: Iversen 17; Rebs: Darbo 8 Asts: Bak 6		Pts: Picard 15; Rebs: Picard, Majerus 5 Asts: Koster 4

Forum Horsens, Horsens
Attendance: 722
Referees: Grzegorz Ziemblicki (POL), Torkild Rodsand (NOR), Alexander Romanov (RUS)

==== Group D ====
Team	Pld	W	L	PF	PA	PD	Pts
Belarus	4	3	1	341	306	+35	7
Slovakia	4	2	2	292	341	−49	6
Hungary	4	1	3	278	264	+14	5

1 August 2013
19:00

Boxscore

Belarus	79–75	Hungary
Scoring by quarter: 14–26, 27–19, 23–17, 15–13
Pts: Liutych 17; Rebs: Pustahvar 8 Asts: Kudrautsau 8		Pts: Vojvoda 17; Rebs: Keller 11; Asts: Trotter 4

Minsk Sports Palace, Minsk
Attendance: 1,100
Referees: Sergey Krug (RUS), Tomas Jasevicius (LTU), Marek Maliszewski (POL)

4 August 2013
18:00

Boxscore

Hungary	75–43	Slovakia
Scoring by quarter: 24–5, 21–10, 15–13, 15–15
Pts: Vojvoda 17; Rebs: Keller, Szabó 7 Asts: Simon 6		Pts: Dorazil 16; Rebs: Dorazil 10; Asts: Grznár 2

MKB Aréna Sopron, Sopron
Attendance: 1,100
Referees: Miguel Anguel Perez Niz (ESP), Sergey Mikhaylov (RUS), Fabiana Martinescu (ROU)

7 August 2013
18:00

Boxscore

Slovakia	97–85	Belarus
Scoring by quarter: 24–14, 21–29, 22–19, 30–23
Pts: Batka 27; Rebs: Dorazil 11; Asts: Ziak 5		Pts: Liutych 33; Rebs: Parakhouski 13; Asts: Charykau, Kudrautsau 3

Sport Hall DUKLA, Banská Bystrica
Attendance: 800
Referees: Marek Cmikiewicz (POL), Moritz Reiter (GER), Doru Vinasi (ROU)

10 August 2013
18:30

Boxscore

Hungary	61–63	Belarus
Scoring by quarter: 12–13, 16–19, 17–22, 16–9
Pts: Vojvoda 19; Rebs: N. Tóth, Keller 7 Asts: Szabó 3		Pts: Liutych 21; Rebs: Parakhouski 7 Asts: Charykau 3

Messzi István Sportcsarnok, Kecskemét
Attendance: 4,000
Referees: Ademir Zurapovic (BIH), Haydn Jones (WAL), Radomir Vojinovic (MNE)

13 August 2013
18:00

Boxscore

Slovakia	79–67	Hungary
Scoring by quarter: 23–14, 20–14, 23–24, 13–15
Pts: Batka 19; Rebs: Dorazil 8 Asts: Kozlik, Grznár 5		Pts: A. Tóth 12; Rebs: Szabó 5 Asts: Wittmann, Szabó 3

Sport Hall DUKLA, Banská Bystrica
Attendance: 900
Referees: Oliver Krause (GER), Piotr Pastusiak (POL), Andrej Lovsin (SLO)

16 August 2013
19:00

Boxscore

Belarus	114–73	Slovakia
Scoring by quarter: 31–21, 34–21, 29–11, 20–20
Pts: Trastsinetski 21; Rebs: Krysevich, Meshcharakou 8 Asts: Trastsinetski 6		Pts: Bilik 17; Rebs: Dorazil 10; Asts: Ziak, Tot 3

Minsk Sports Palace, Minsk
Attendance: 1,800
Referees: Jurgis Laurinavicius (LTU), Marcin Kowalski (POL), Henri Hilke (FIN)

=== Knockout stage ===
==== Bracket ====
Semifinals
A1	Bulgaria	92	87	179
C1	Switzerland	71	67	138
B1	Estonia	70	79	149
D1	Belarus	76	61	137

Final
A1	Bulgaria	58	49	107
B1	Estonia	55	61	116

==== Semifinals ====
===== First leg =====
22 August 2013
19:00

Boxscore

Belarus	76–70	Estonia
Scoring by quarter: 21–25, 19–12, 11–6, 25–27
Pts: Kudrautsau 21; Rebs: Parakhouski, Kudrautsau 8 Asts: three players 2		Pts: Hallik 21; Rebs: Talts 10; Asts: Sokk 3

Olimpiec Sports Complex, Mogilev
Attendance: 800
Referees: Sasa Maricic (SRB), Sergiy Zashchuk (UKR), Sergey Mikhaylov (RUS)

22 August 2013
19:30

Boxscore

Bulgaria	92–71	Switzerland
Scoring by quarter: 25–17, 19–24, 24–20, 24–10
Pts: Georgiev 13; Rebs: Ivanov 8 Asts: Mirković 9		Pts: Mlađan, Capela 18; Rebs: Kazadi, Dubas 8 Asts: Mafuta 5

Universiada Hall, Sofia
Attendance: 1,500
Referees: Spyridon Gontas (GRE), Miodrag Licina (SRB), Milos Koljensic (MNE)

===== Second leg =====
25 August 2013
16:00

Boxscore

Switzerland	67–87	Bulgaria
Scoring by quarter: 16–24, 15–21, 15–15, 21–27
Pts: Capela 19; Rebs: Capela 6 Asts: Mlađan, Petković 3		Pts: Ivanov 17; Rebs: Kostov 6 Asts: three players 3

Site Sportif Saint-Leonard, Fribourg
Attendance: 1,340
Referees: Benjamin Jimenez Trujillo (ESP), Saverio Lanzarini (ITA), Paulo Marques (POR)

25 August 2013
20:00

Boxscore

Estonia	79–61	Belarus
Scoring by quarter: 19–17, 18–14, 18–14, 24–16
Pts: Kangur 20; Rebs: Kangur 10; Asts: Talts 4		Pts: Kudrautsau 22; Rebs: Parakhouski 8 Asts: five players 1

Saku Suurhall Arena, Tallinn
Attendance: 6,000
Referees: Petri Mäntylä (FIN), Oskars Lucis (LAT), Mindaugas Vecerskis (LTU)

==== Final ====
===== First leg =====
29 August 2013
19:30

Boxscore

Bulgaria	58–55	Estonia
Scoring by quarter: 16–15, 15–20, 19–6, 8–14
Pts: Ivanov 15; Rebs: Ivanov 11; Asts: Ivanov 5		Pts: Veideman 11; Rebs: Arbet 6 Asts: Arbet 3

Universiada Hall, Sofia
Attendance: 1,500
Referees: Zoran Sutulovic (MNE), Marcin Kowalski (POL), Keith Williams (ENG)

===== Second leg =====
1 September 2013
20:00

Boxscore

Estonia	61–49	Bulgaria
Scoring by quarter: 25–10, 14–14, 11–13, 11–12
Pts: Veideman, Dorbek 10; Rebs: Vene, Kangur 6 Asts: five players 2		Pts: Ivanov 13; Rebs: Ivanov 9 Asts: Ivanov 3

Saku Suurhall Arena, Tallinn
Attendance: 7,500
Referees: Emilio Perez (ESP), Moritz Reiter (GER), Ingus Baumanis (LAT)

== Second round ==
=== Seedings ===
Pot 1	Pot 2	Pot 3	Pot 4
Italy; Latvia; Belgium; Bosnia and Herzegovina; Germany; Montenegro; Czech Republic	Great Britain; Macedonia; Israel; Russia; Georgia; Sweden; Poland	Bulgaria; Belarus; Switzerland; Austria; Iceland; Portugal; Slovakia	Denmark; Hungary; Romania; Netherlands; Luxembourg

In the second qualifying round, 26 teams were drawn into five groups of four teams and two groups of three teams. The winners of each group and the six best second-placed teams qualified for EuroBasket 2015. The games were played between 10 August and 27 August 2014.

Key to colors
Team secured a place in the EuroBasket 2015

=== Group A ===
Team	Pld	W	L	PF	PA	PD	Pts
Bosnia and Herzegovina	4	4	0	304	267	+37	8
Iceland	4	2	2	286	289	−3	6
Great Britain	4	0	4	274	308	−34	4

10 August 2014
19:00

Boxscore

Iceland	83–70	Great Britain
Scoring by quarter: 22–10, 12–24, 25–24, 24–12
Pts: Pálsson 24; Rebs: Bæringsson 15; Asts: Ermolinskij 14		Pts: Clark 20; Rebs: Sullivan 9 Asts: Van Oostrum 4

Laugardalshöll, Reykjavík
Attendance: 1,418
Referees: Renaud Geller (BEL), Apostolos Kalpakas (SWE), Clemens Fritz (GER)

13 August 2014
19:35

Boxscore

Great Britain	67–80	Bosnia and Herzegovina
Scoring by quarter: 11–23, 20–23, 19–21, 17–13
Pts: Clark 14; Rebs: Clark 9 Asts: Van Oostrum 3		Pts: Teletović 25; Rebs: Mitrović 7 Asts: Pašalić, Stipanović 4

Copper Box, London
Attendance: 5,215
Referees: Daniel Hierrezuelo (ESP), Paolo Taurino (ITA), Sérgio Silva (POR)

17 August 2014
20:00

Boxscore

Bosnia and Herzegovina	72–62	Iceland
Scoring by quarter: 22–10, 12–17, 22–6, 16–29
Pts: Teletović 29; Rebs: Teletović 12; Asts: Gordić 5		Pts: Gunnarsson 18; Rebs: Hermannsson 6 Asts: Vilhjálmsson 2

SKPC Mejdan, Tuzla
Attendance: 7,000
Referees: Alessandro Martolini (ITA), Ioannis Foufis (GRE), Erez Gurion (ISR)

20 August 2014
19:35

Boxscore

Great Britain	69–71	Iceland
Scoring by quarter: 22–18, 16–10, 16–28, 15–15
Pts: Achara 15; Rebs: Clark, Van Oostrum 8 Asts: Van Oostrum 5		Pts: Stefánsson 23; Rebs: Bæringsson 13; Asts: Vilhjálmsson 5

Copper Box, London
Attendance: 4,379
Referees: Fernando Rocha (POR), Regis Bardera (FRA), Fernando Cuevas (ESP)

24 August 2014
20:00

Boxscore

Bosnia and Herzegovina	74–68	Great Britain
Scoring by quarter: 22–19, 19–18, 20–22, 13–9
Pts: Teletović 25; Rebs: Milošević 10; Asts: Gordić 7		Pts: Mockford 19; Rebs: Clark 7 Asts: Sullivan 4

Dvorana Mirza Delibašić, Sarajevo
Attendance: 6,500
Referees: Benjamin Trujillo (ESP), Saverio Lanzarini (ITA), Tomasz Trawicki (POL)

27 August 2014
19:30

Boxscore

Iceland	70–78	Bosnia and Herzegovina
Scoring by quarter: 16–24, 31–19, 11–15, 12–20
Pts: Stefánsson 21; Rebs: Pálsson 9 Asts: Vilhjálmsson, Ermolinskij 3		Pts: Kikanović 24; Rebs: Kikanović 16; Asts: Gordić 5

Laugardalshöll, Reykjavík
Attendance: 2,500
Referees: Anton Makhlin (RUS), Moritz Reiter (GER), Johannes Sarekoski (FIN)

=== Group B ===
Team	Pld	W	L	PF	PA	PD	Pts	Tie
Israel	6	4	2	487	435	+52	10	2–0
Netherlands	6	4	2	378	374	+4	10	0–2
Montenegro	6	3	3	434	447	−13	9	
Bulgaria	6	1	5	400	443	−43	7	

10 August 2014
19:00

Boxscore

Israel	97–100 (OT)	Montenegro
Scoring by quarter: 20–17, 20–22, 18–27, 28–20, Overtime: 11–14
Pts: Casspi 28; Rebs: Casspi 10; Asts: Mekel 6		Pts: Rochestie 17; Rebs: Dragičević, Šehović 6 Asts: Rochestie 9

Eleftheria Indoor Hall, Nicosia, Cyprus
Attendance: 400
Referees: Fernando Rocha (POR), Elias Koromilas (GRE), Marius Ciulin (ROU)

10 August 2014
20:30

Boxscore

Bulgaria	53–62	Netherlands
Scoring by quarter: 15–20, 12–17, 6–11, 20–14
Pts: Avramov 17; Rebs: Nikolov 6 Asts: Marinov, Vezenkov 3		Pts: Slagter 18; Rebs: Oudendag 9 Asts: three players 3

Arena Samokov, Samokov
Attendance: 1,200
Referees: Borys Shulga (UKR), Evgeny Vetrov (RUS), Ciprian Stoica (ROU)

13 August 2014
19:30

Boxscore

Netherlands	57–66	Israel
Scoring by quarter: 22–21, 19–24, 12–13, 4–8
Pts: Schaftenaar 12; Rebs: Oudendag 11; Asts: Slagter 7		Pts: Pnini 16; Rebs: Casspi 8 Asts: Mekel 5

MartiniPlaza, Groningen
Attendance: 1,200
Referees: Antonio Conde (ESP), Semen Ovinov (RUS), Haydn Jones (WAL)

13 August 2014
21:00

Boxscore

Montenegro	70–64 (OT)	Bulgaria
Scoring by quarter: 11–20, 21–13, 12–12, 16–15, Overtime: 10–4
Pts: Dragičević 20; Rebs: Dragičević 9 Asts: Mihailović 6		Pts: Vezenkov 14; Rebs: Vezenkov 8 Asts: Marinov, Avramov 3

Morača Sports Center, Podgorica
Attendance: 2,100
Referees: Christos Christodoulou (GRE), Saša Pukl (SLO), Antonis Demetriou (CYP)

17 August 2014
20:30

Boxscore

Bulgaria	84–100	Israel
Scoring by quarter: 22–29, 16–17, 20–34, 26–20
Pts: Vezenkov 18; Rebs: Varbanov 12; Asts: Marinov 5		Pts: Casspi 19; Rebs: Fischer 13; Asts: Mekel 7

Universiada Hall, Sofia
Attendance: 1,200
Referees: Benjamin Jiménez (ESP), Nikolaos Somos (GRE), Saša Maričić (SRB)

17 August 2014
21:00

Boxscore

Montenegro	60–65	Netherlands
Scoring by quarter: 20–15, 16–15, 5–20, 19–15
Pts: Šehović 13; Rebs: Golubović 7 Asts: Rochestie 6		Pts: Schaftenaar 18; Rebs: Oudendag 7 Asts: Slagter 4

Morača Sports Center, Podgorica
Attendance: 2,100
Referees: Anton Makhlin (RUS), Georgios Poursanidis (GRE), Yener Yilmaz (TUR)

20 August 2014
20:00

Boxscore

Netherlands	66–57	Bulgaria
Scoring by quarter: 23–18, 16–22, 14–9, 13–8
Pts: Schaftenaar 17; Rebs: Koenis, Schaftenaar 7 Asts: Slagter, Williams 4		Pts: Vezenkov 26; Rebs: Vezenkov 5 Asts: Velikov 4

Vijf Meihal, Leiden
Attendance: 1,500
Referees: Miguel Pérez (ESP), Manuel Mazzoni (ITA), Paul Walton (ENG)

20 August 2014
21:00

Boxscore

Montenegro	65–80	Israel
Scoring by quarter: 20–20, 12–17, 19–24, 14–19
Pts: Dragičević 19; Rebs: Borisov 7 Asts: Rochestie 5		Pts: Casspi 17; Rebs: Mekel 11; Asts: Mekel 11

Morača Sports Center, Podgorica
Attendance: 4,100
Referees: Luigi Lamonica (ITA), Vicente Bulto (ESP), Panagiotis Anastopoulos (GRE)

24 August 2014
19:00

Boxscore

Israel	83–60	Netherlands
Scoring by quarter: 26–5, 22–18, 14–19, 21–18
Pts: Casspi 22; Rebs: Casspi 8 Asts: Mekel, Pnini 6		Pts: De Jong 15; Rebs: Oudendag 9 Asts: Williams 4

Eleftheria Indoor Hall, Nicosia, Cyprus
Attendance: 300
Referees: Alessandro Martolini (ITA), Oscar Perea (ESP), Charalampos Karakatsounis (GRE)

24 August 2014
20:30

Boxscore

Bulgaria	73–84	Montenegro
Scoring by quarter: 23–18, 11–23, 23–22, 16–21
Pts: Vezenkov 17; Rebs: Vezenkov 7 Asts: Avramov 4		Pts: Rochestie 17; Rebs: Golubović 10; Asts: Ivanović 6

Universiada Hall, Sofia
Attendance: 500
Referees: Miguel Pérez (ESP), Rüstü Nuran (TUR), Ioannis Foufis (GRE)

27 August 2014
20:00

Boxscore

Netherlands	68–55	Montenegro
Scoring by quarter: 17–18, 13–15, 20–5, 18–17
Pts: Slagter 15; Rebs: Kherrazi 9 Asts: Slagter 5		Pts: Šehović 17; Rebs: Golubović 6 Asts: Rochestie, Ivanović 3

Vijf Meihal, Leiden
Attendance: 2,500
Referees: Emin Moğulkoç (TUR), Petr Hrůša (CZE), Nick Van den Broeck (BEL)

27 August 2014
20:45

Boxscore

Israel	61–69	Bulgaria
Scoring by quarter: 19–16, 22–12, 11–17, 9–24
Pts: Eliyahu 16; Rebs: Eliyahu 7 Asts: Pnini 6		Pts: Vezenkov 20; Rebs: Vezenkov 8 Asts: Avramov 4

Kition Athletic Center, Larnaca, Cyprus
Attendance: 100
Referees: Spyridon Gontas (GRE), Jurgis Laurinavicius (LTU), Tomislav Vovk (CRO)

=== Group C ===
Team	Pld	W	L	PF	PA	PD	Pts
Poland	6	5	1	540	436	+104	11
Germany	6	4	2	535	404	+131	10
Austria	6	3	3	465	483	−18	9
Luxembourg	6	0	6	387	604	−217	6

10 August 2014
20:00

Boxscore

Poland	68–67	Germany
Scoring by quarter: 22–20, 14–11, 20–19, 12–17
Pts: Waczyński 19; Rebs: Cel 10; Asts: Skibniewski 5		Pts: Schaffartzik, Schröder 16; Rebs: Zirbes 9 Asts: Schröder 5

Toruń Torwar Hall, Toruń
Attendance: 5,200
Referees: Robert Vyklický (CZE), Gentian Cici (ALB), Igor Mitrovski (MKD)

10 August 2014
20:20

Boxscore

Austria	84–76	Luxembourg
Scoring by quarter: 30–14, 21–13, 19–22, 14–27
Pts: Schreiner 16; Rebs: Mahalbašić 10; Asts: Klepeisz 5		Pts: Schumacher 19; Rebs: Birenbaum, Arbaut 4 Asts: Birenbaum 4

Multiversum, Schwechat
Attendance: 500
Referees: Václav Lukeš (CZE), Tamás Benczur (HUN), Mario Majkič (SLO)

13 August 2014
19:30

Boxscore

Luxembourg	61–113	Poland
Scoring by quarter: 10–26, 17–23, 24–39, 10–25
Pts: Jones 16; Rebs: four players 2 Asts: three players 1		Pts: Szewczyk 20; Rebs: Kulig 7 Asts: Szewczyk, Laczynski 3

D'Coque, Luxembourg City
Attendance: 600
Referees: Joseph Bissang (FRA), Nick van den Broeck (BEL), Sebastien Clivaz (SUI)

13 August 2014
20:20

Boxscore

Austria	64–77	Germany
Scoring by quarter: 14–19, 21–14, 20–15, 9–29
Pts: Murati 27; Rebs: Mahalbašić 8 Asts: Schreiner 6		Pts: Kleber 20; Rebs: Kleber, Zirbes 7 Asts: Schaffartzik 5

Multiversum, Schwechat
Attendance: 2,500
Referees: Milija Vojinović (SRB), Matej Boltauzer (SLO), Tamas Földhazi (HUN)

17 August 2014
19:00

Boxscore

Germany	109–49	Luxembourg
Scoring by quarter: 29–17, 26–18, 27–5, 27–9
Pts: four players 12; Rebs: Theis 12; Asts: Schaffartzik 6		Pts: Jones 12; Rebs: Schumacher, Jones 4 Asts: Schumacher 4

Trier Arena, Trier
Attendance: 3,251
Referees: Keith Williams (ENG), Vladimir Tsekov (BUL), Nikola Perlic (CRO)

17 August 2014
20:20

Boxscore

Austria	83–81	Poland
Scoring by quarter: 24–26, 21–18, 20–23, 18–14
Pts: Mahalbašić 24; Rebs: Mahalbašić 5 Asts: Schreiner, Mahalbašić 4		Pts: Cel 14; Rebs: Waczyński 8 Asts: Skibniewski 6

Multiversum, Schwechat
Attendance: 1,000
Referees: Ilija Belošević (SRB), Johann Jeanneau (FRA), Paul Walton (ENG)

20 August 2014
19:30

Boxscore

Luxembourg	71–80	Austria
Scoring by quarter: 28–24, 15–18, 20–24, 8–14
Pts: Schumacher 19; Rebs: Jones 6 Asts: Delgado 5		Pts: Mahalbašić 19; Rebs: Mahalbašić 12; Asts: Mahalbašić 6

D'Coque, Luxembourg City
Attendance: 573
Referees: Haydn Jones (WAL), Pedro Coelho (POR), Vincent Delestrée (BEL)

20 August 2014
20:00

Boxscore

Germany	76–88	Poland
Scoring by quarter: 15–26, 26–17, 12–23, 23–22
Pts: Theis, Schröder 20; Rebs: Theis 8 Asts: Schröder 7		Pts: Ponitka 19; Rebs: Cel 5 Asts: Skibniewski 6

Telekom Dome, Bonn
Attendance: 4,500
Referees: Sreten Radović (CRO), Petar Obradović (BIH), Sašo Petek (SLO)

24 August 2014
14:00

Boxscore

Germany	88–69	Austria
Scoring by quarter: 28–15, 17–26, 17–22, 26–6
Pts: Schröder 24; Rebs: Benzing, Kleber 5 Asts: Schröder 6		Pts: Mahalbašić 17; Rebs: Rados 6 Asts: Schreiner 7

Enervie Arena, Hagen
Attendance: 3,052
Referees: Emin Moğulkoç (TUR), Boris Gabara (SVK), Petar Denkovski (MKD)

24 August 2014
20:00

Boxscore

Poland	100–64	Luxembourg
Scoring by quarter: 14–17, 26–11, 30–18, 30–18
Pts: Szewczyk 17; Rebs: Kulig 13; Asts: Łączyński 10		Pts: Rodenbourg 14; Rebs: Jones 5 Asts: Jones 5

Hala Widowiskowo-Sportowa, Koszalin
Attendance: 3,000
Referees: Gennadi Ponomarev (RUS), Marek Kúkelčík (SVK), Ivan Miličević (BIH)

27 August 2014
19:30

Boxscore

Luxembourg	66–118	Germany
Scoring by quarter: 19–23, 21–20, 19–36, 15–39
Pts: Arbaut 16; Rebs: Jones 8 Asts: Jones 5		Pts: Theis 17; Rebs: Seiferth 10; Asts: Schröder 7

D'Coque, Luxembourg City
Attendance: 1,700
Referees: Johann Jeanneau (FRA), Simon Unsworth (ENG), Paulus Van Den Heuvel (NED)

27 August 2014
20:00

Boxscore

Poland	90–85 (OT)	Austria
Scoring by quarter: 15–22, 24–18, 19–16, 23–25, Overtime: 9–4
Pts: Kulig 22; Rebs: Kulig 12; Asts: Skibniewski 5		Pts: Mahalbašić 27; Rebs: Mahalbašić 13; Asts: Schreiner 6

Cuprum Arena, Lubin
Attendance: 3,700
Referees: Igor Dragojević (MNE), Haris Bijedić (BIH), Sergii Tyslenko (UKR)

=== Group D ===
Team	Pld	W	L	PF	PA	PD	Pts	Tie
Belgium	6	5	1	454	379	+75	11	1–1, +0, on road - 73
Macedonia	6	5	1	450	393	+57	11	1–1, +0, on road - 60
Belarus	6	2	4	436	461	−25	8	
Denmark	6	0	6	372	479	−107	6	

10 August 2014
18:00

Boxscore

Belarus	97–72	Denmark
Scoring by quarter: 20–12, 23–16, 22–21, 32–23
Pts: Pustahvar 24; Rebs: Paliashchuk, Pustahvar 11; Asts: Charykau 7		Pts: Reinholt 14; Rebs: Jukic 11; Asts: Jukic, Møller 3

Minsk-Arena, Minsk
Attendance: 1,600
Referees: Olegs Latiševs (LAT), Henri Hilke (FIN), Artūras Šukys (LTU)

10 August 2014
20:30

Boxscore

Macedonia	76–73 (OT)	Belgium
Scoring by quarter: 16–19, 7–17, 22–13, 17–13, Overtime: 14–11
Pts: Stojanovski, Trajkovski 16; Rebs: Hendrix 11; Asts: Kostoski 4		Pts: Hervelle 17; Rebs: three players 4 Asts: Hervelle 5

Boris Trajkovski Sports Center, Skopje
Attendance: 5,500
Referees: Rüştü Nuran (TUR), Marek Cmikiewicz (POL), Manuel Mazzoni (ITA)

13 August 2014
19:30

Boxscore

Denmark	75–81	Macedonia
Scoring by quarter: 18–24, 18–20, 18–11, 21–26
Pts: Seilund 17; Rebs: Bergstedt 10; Asts: Reinholt 4		Pts: three players 12; Rebs: Hendrix 7 Asts: Trajkovski 4

Forum Horsens, Horsens
Attendance: 968
Referees: Juris Kokainis (LAT), Tomas Jasevičius (LTU), Sergei Beliakov (RUS)

13 August 2014
20:30

Boxscore

Belgium	71–57	Belarus
Scoring by quarter: 24–19, 14–9, 18–11, 15–18
Pts: Gillet 15; Rebs: Gillet, de Zeeuw 7 Asts: Bosco, Hervelle 3		Pts: Kudrautsau 15; Rebs: Kudrautsau 8 Asts: Charykau 4

Spiroudome, Charleroi
Attendance: 800
Referees: Luigi Lamonica (ITA), Miguel Pérez (ESP), Paulo Marques (POR)

17 August 2014
15:00

Boxscore

Belgium	71–50	Denmark
Scoring by quarter: 12–12, 29–17, 19–12, 11–9
Pts: Schwartz 12; Rebs: De Zeeuw 9 Asts: Bosco 6		Pts: Jukic 14; Rebs: Bergstedt 7 Asts: Laerke, Reinholt 2

Spiroudome, Charleroi
Attendance: 748
Referees: Boris Gabara (SVK), Tamas Benczur (HUN), Pedro Coelho (POR)

17 August 2014
18:00

Boxscore

Belarus	70–81	Macedonia
Scoring by quarter: 14–28, 24–8, 14–23, 18–22
Pts: Liutych 17; Rebs: Paliashchuk 10; Asts: Charykau 3		Pts: Trajkovski 17; Rebs: Hendrix 10; Asts: Sokolov 5

Minsk-Arena, Minsk
Attendance: 1,200
Referees: Jakub Zamojski (POL), Oskars Lucis (LAT), Gintaras Vitkauskas (LTU)

20 August 2014
19:30

Boxscore

Denmark	66–73	Belarus
Scoring by quarter: 23–16, 17–20, 16–15, 10–22
Pts: Reinholt 17; Rebs: Bergstedt 5 Asts: Reinholt 3		Pts: Liutych 21; Rebs: Paliashchuk, Pustahvar 7 Asts: Charykau 4

Forum Horsens, Horsens
Attendance: 669
Referees: Neil Wilkinson (ENG), Nebojša Kovačevič (GER), Dariusz Zapolski (POL)

20 August 2014
20:30

Boxscore

Belgium	63–60	Macedonia
Scoring by quarter: 12–11, 21–12, 17–19, 13–18
Pts: De Zeeuw 13; Rebs: Hervelle 10; Asts: Bosco 4		Pts: Hendrix 14; Rebs: Hendrix 14; Asts: Stojanovski 4

Spiroudome, Charleroi
Attendance: 1,369
Referees: Joseph Bissang (FRA), Milos Koljensić (MNE), Robert Vyklický (CZE)

24 August 2014
18:00

Boxscore

Belarus	73–99	Belgium
Scoring by quarter: 16–28, 21–18, 18–33, 18–20
Pts: Kudrautsau 20; Rebs: Meshcharakou 6 Asts: three players 3		Pts: Lojeski 28; Rebs: Bosco 6 Asts: Bosco 9

Minsk-Arena, Minsk
Attendance: 1,500
Referees: Borys Ryzhyk (UKR), Piotr Pastusiak (POL), Mindaugas Večerskis (LTU)

24 August 2014
20:30

Boxscore

Macedonia	80–46	Denmark
Scoring by quarter: 22–13, 19–16, 13–11, 26–6
Pts: Hendrix 15; Rebs: Hendrix 12; Asts: Stojanovski, Trajkovski 4		Pts: Bergstedt 16; Rebs: Jukic, Bergstedt 5 Asts: Reinholt, Bak 1

Boris Trajkovski Sports Center, Skopje
Attendance: 5,100
Referees: Grzegorz Ziemblicki (POL), Miroslav Tomov (BUL), Semen Ovinov (RUS)

27 August 2014
19:30

Boxscore

Denmark	63–77	Belgium
Scoring by quarter: 15–18, 17–16, 18–22, 13–21
Pts: Reinholt 21; Rebs: Bergstedt 7 Asts: Laerke 4		Pts: Hervelle 24; Rebs: Hervelle 12; Asts: Bosco 6

Forum Horsens, Horsens
Attendance: 1,008
Referees: Sinisa Herceg (CRO), Markos Michaelides (SUI), Fedja Serhatlic (SWE)

27 August 2014
20:30

Boxscore

Macedonia	72–66	Belarus
Scoring by quarter: 26–17, 14–17, 17–9, 15–23
Pts: Stojanovski 13; Rebs: Hendrix 10; Asts: Stojanovski 4		Pts: Sitnik 18; Rebs: Pustahvar 6 Asts: three players 2

Boris Trajkovski Sports Center, Skopje
Attendance: 5,400
Referees: Srdan Dozai (CRO), Ciprian Stoica (ROU), Stanislav Kučera (CZE)

=== Group E ===
Team	Pld	W	L	PF	PA	PD	Pts	Tie
Georgia	6	4	2	454	430	+24	10	2–2, +11
Czech Republic	6	4	2	446	400	+46	10	2–2, −4
Hungary	6	4	2	402	376	+26	10	2–2, −7
Portugal	6	0	6	353	449	−96	6	

10 August 2014
19:00

Boxscore

Georgia	73–62	Czech Republic
Scoring by quarter: 17–12, 19–20, 19–21, 18–9
Pts: Pachulia 19; Rebs: Sanikidze 12; Asts: Tsintsadze 10		Pts: Auda 18; Rebs: Balvín 7 Asts: Satoranský 8

Tbilisi Sports Palace, Tbilisi
Attendance: 7,500
Referees: Emin Moğulkoç (TUR), Moritz Reiter (GER), Milos Koljensić (MNE)

10 August 2014
19:30

Boxscore

Portugal	38–58	Hungary
Scoring by quarter: 10–23, 10–18, 8–6, 10–11
Pts: Lima 12; Rebs: Hallman 9 Asts: Fernandes 3		Pts: Vojvoda 20; Rebs: A. Keller 13; Asts: J. Keller 5

Pavilhao dos Desportos de Sines, Sines
Attendance: 2,000
Referees: Vicente Bulto (ESP), Tolga Sahin (ITA), Mathieu Bayot (BEL)

13 August 2014
18:00

Boxscore

Czech Republic	89–53	Portugal
Scoring by quarter: 27–14, 24–17, 23–11, 15–11
Pts: Satoranský 18; Rebs: Pomikálek 7 Asts: Satoranský 5		Pts: Da Silva 11; Rebs: Guerreiro 5 Asts: Fernandes 4

Sportovní Centrum, Nymburk
Attendance: 1,050
Referees: Aleksandar Glisić (SRB), Aleksandar Milojević (MKD), Kfir Mualem (ISR)

13 August 2014
18:00

Boxscore

Hungary	74–73	Georgia
Scoring by quarter: 19–18, 18–18, 17–19, 20–18
Pts: Vojvoda 20; Rebs: A. Keller, Vojvoda 5 Asts: J. Keller 6		Pts: Pachulia 19; Rebs: Pachulia 6 Asts: Tsintsadze, Shengelia 4

Messzi István Sportcsarnok, Kecskemét
Attendance: 1,500
Referees: Zoran Šutulović (MNE), Janusz Calik (POL), Boris Gabara (SVK)

17 August 2014
16:00

Boxscore

Portugal	90–91 (OT)	Georgia
Scoring by quarter: 24–14, 21–12, 19–32, 15–21, Overtime: 11–12
Pts: Da Silva 26; Rebs: Soares 9 Asts: Fernandes 8		Pts: Pachulia 25; Rebs: Sanikidze 13; Asts: Tsintsadze 5

Arena Dolce Vita, Ovar
Attendance: 700
Referees: Miguel Pérez Pérez (ESP), Carmelo Paternico (ITA), Jean-Charles Collin (FRA)

17 August 2014
18:00

Boxscore

Czech Republic	66–63	Hungary
Scoring by quarter: 20–16, 17–18, 15–9, 14–20
Pts: Pumprla 14; Rebs: Pumprla 7 Asts: Welsch 7		Pts: Vojvoda 25; Rebs: Tóth 9 Asts: Wittmann, Thomas 3

Sportovní Centrum, Nymburk
Attendance: 1,500
Referees: Milivoje Jovčić (SRB), Olegs Latiševs (LAT), Piotr Pastusiak (POL)

20 August 2014
17:45

Boxscore

Hungary	65–52	Portugal
Scoring by quarter: 16–15, 14–17, 23–10, 12–10
Pts: Wittmann 16; Rebs: Vojvoda 8 Asts: Vojvoda, Thomas 3		Pts: Hallman 15; Rebs: Hallman 9 Asts: Balseiro, Pinto 2

Messzi István Sportcsarnok, Kecskemét
Attendance: 1,800
Referees: Igor Dragojević (MNE), Gentian Cici (ALB), Torkild Rodsand (NOR)

20 August 2014
18:00

Boxscore

Czech Republic	86–67	Georgia
Scoring by quarter: 18–13, 21–17, 19–20, 28–17
Pts: Satoranský 16; Rebs: Balvín 7 Asts: Satoranský 6		Pts: Sanikidze 17; Rebs: Pachulia 7 Asts: Tsintsadze 4

Sportovní Centrum, Nymburk
Attendance: 1,500
Referees: Daniel Hierrezuelo (ESP), Jurgis Laurinavicius (LTU), Ciprian Stoica (ROU)

24 August 2014
16:00

Boxscore

Portugal	61–75	Czech Republic
Scoring by quarter: 21–24, 16–18, 13–21, 11–12
Pts: Fonseca 22; Rebs: Fonseca 10; Asts: Fernandes, Pinto 3		Pts: Satoranský 18; Rebs: Pumprla 11; Asts: Satoranský 5

Gondomar Arena, Gondomar
Attendance: 1,500
Referees: Miguel Pérez (ESP), Roberto Chiari (ITA), Marko Vučković (SLO)

24 August 2014
19:00

Boxscore

Georgia	79–59	Hungary
Scoring by quarter: 22–12, 23–18, 17–21, 17–8
Pts: Shengelia 26; Rebs: Sanikidze 9 Asts: Tsintsadze 10		Pts: Wittmann 14; Rebs: A. Keller 6 Asts: Vojvoda 7

Tbilisi Sports Palace, Tbilisi
Attendance: 9,000
Referees: Ademir Zurapović (BIH), Clemens Fritz (GER), Radomir Vojinovic (MNE)

27 August 2014
17:45

Boxscore

Hungary	83–68	Czech Republic
Scoring by quarter: 20–13, 12-18, 26–19, 22–18
Pts: Vojvoda 20; Rebs: A. Keller 11; Asts: Wittmann 7		Pts: Houška, Satoranský 18; Rebs: Balvín 8 Asts: Welsch 6

Tiszaligeti Sportcsarnok, Szolnok
Attendance: 2,080
Referees: Jakub Zamojski (POL), Panagiotis Anastopoulos (GRE), Alexandru Olaru (ROU)

27 August 2014
19:00

Boxscore

Georgia	71–59	Portugal
Scoring by quarter: 22–15, 14–16, 16–14, 19–14
Pts: Sanikidze 20; Rebs: Pachulia 10; Asts: Pachulia 9		Pts: Fonseca 17; Rebs: Queiroz 6 Asts: Fernandes 10

Tbilisi Sports Palace, Tbilisi
Attendance: 8,000
Referees: Pérez Perez (ESP), Ersan Kartal (TUR), Oskars Lucis (LAT)

=== Group F ===
Team	Pld	W	L	PF	PA	PD	Pts
Latvia	6	6	0	486	392	+94	12
Romania	6	4	2	471	483	−12	10
Sweden	6	2	4	442	455	−13	8
Slovakia	6	0	6	435	504	−69	6

10 August 2014
18:00

Boxscore

Sweden	50–62	Latvia
Scoring by quarter: 14–21, 16–15, 10–13, 10–13
Pts: Borg 11; Rebs: Kjellbom 5 Asts: Kjellbom, Massamba 2		Pts: Bērziņš 14; Rebs: Bērziņš 9 Asts: Timma, Strēlnieks 3

Luleå Energi Arena, Luleå
Attendance: 1,636
Referees: Neil Wilkinson (ENG), Luis Lopes (POR), Marcin Kowalski (POL)

10 August 2014
18:00

Boxscore

Slovakia	69–81	Romania
Scoring by quarter: 27–13, 14–18, 13–29, 15–21
Pts: Milošević 20; Rebs: Jašš 10; Asts: Milošević 7		Pts: Nicoară 20; Rebs: Moldoveanu 9 Asts: Calotă 4

Hala Pezinok, Pezinok
Attendance: 800
Referees: Jakub Zamojski (POL), Christoph Rohacky (AUT), Gellért Kapitany (HUN)

13 August 2014
19:00

Boxscore

Romania	77–72 (OT)	Sweden
Scoring by quarter: 12–14, 16–11, 18–20, 20–21, Overtime: 11–6
Pts: Baciu 18; Rebs: Moldoveanu 9 Asts: Guțoaia 5		Pts: Pahlmblad 17; Rebs: Kjellbom 9 Asts: three players 3

Sala Transilvania, Sibiu
Attendance: 1,800
Referees: Spyridon Gontas (GRE), Marko Juras (SRB), Zdravko Rutešić (MNE)

13 August 2014
20:15

Boxscore

Latvia	86–66	Slovakia
Scoring by quarter: 23–14, 26–12, 16–14, 21–26
Pts: Bērziņš 18; Rebs: Bērziņš 8 Asts: Strēlnieks 6		Pts: Sedmák 17; Rebs: Simek 6 Asts: Milošević 5

Arena Riga, Riga
Attendance: 4,700
Referees: Anton Makhlin (RUS), Wojciech Liszka (POL), Vladyslav Isachenko (UKR)

17 August 2014
18:00

Boxscore

Slovakia	72–75	Sweden
Scoring by quarter: 26–20, 14–20, 8–24, 24–11
Pts: Sedmák 23; Rebs: Žiak 8 Asts: Žiak, Milošević 3		Pts: Pahlmblad 14; Rebs: Kjellbom 9 Asts: Massamba 4

Hala Pezinok, Pezinok
Attendance: 700
Referees: Ademir Zurapović (BIH), Marek Maliszewski (POL), Petar Denkovski (MKD)

17 August 2014
20:15

Boxscore

Latvia	88–65	Romania
Scoring by quarter: 20–16, 16–19, 29–18, 23–12
Pts: Blūms 17; Rebs: Bērziņš 9 Asts: Strēlnieks 6		Pts: Moldoveanu 17; Rebs: Nicoară 6 Asts: Tudor 3

Arena Riga, Riga
Attendance: 4,200
Referees: Borys Ryzhyk (UKR), Mario Majkic (SLO), Václav Lukeš (CZE)

20 August 2014
19:00

Boxscore

Romania	90–86	Slovakia
Scoring by quarter: 14–18, 24–25, 23–24, 29–19
Pts: Nicoară, Guțoaia 20; Rebs: Nicoară 12; Asts: Tudor 9		Pts: Jašš 17; Rebs: Sedmák 8 Asts: Milošević 6

Sala Transilvania, Sibiu
Attendance: 1,800
Referees: Paulo Marques (POR), Tomislav Vovk (CRO), Dragan Kralj (BIH)

20 August 2014
20:15

Boxscore

Latvia	79–76 (OT)	Sweden
Scoring by quarter: 17–18, 12–19, 22–13, 14–15, Overtime: 14–11
Pts: Bērziņš 23; Rebs: Bērziņš 10; Asts: Strēlnieks 6		Pts: Kjellbom 19; Rebs: Kjellbom 13; Asts: Borg, Person 4

Arena Riga, Riga
Attendance: 5,214
Referees: Srdan Dozai (CRO), Tomas Jasevičius (LTU), Markos Michaelides (SUI)

24 August 2014
18:00

Boxscore

Slovakia	65–89	Latvia
Scoring by quarter: 16–20, 17–30, 19–22, 13–17
Pts: Sedmák 23; Rebs: Sedmák 6 Asts: Milošević 7		Pts: Blūms, Janičenoks 13; Rebs: Šmits 8 Asts: Bertāns, Janičenoks 3

Hala Pezinok, Pezinok
Attendance: 500
Referees: Milija Vojinović (SRB), Milos Koljensić (MNE), Zoltan Palla (HUN)

24 August 2014
18:00

Boxscore

Sweden	86–88	Romania
Scoring by quarter: 17–22, 21–25, 16–20, 32–21
Pts: Hakanson, Kjellbom 20; Rebs: Kjellbom 11; Asts: three players 3		Pts: Moldoveanu 22; Rebs: Baciu 9 Asts: four players 3

Boråshallen, Borås
Attendance: 1,748
Referees: Milivoje Jovčić (SRB), Haydn Jones (WAL), Sebastien Clivaz (SUI)

27 August 2014
19:00

Boxscore

Sweden	83–77	Slovakia
Scoring by quarter: 22–16, 17–24, 20–15, 24–22
Pts: Massamba 21; Rebs: Kjellbom 9 Asts: Massamba 5		Pts: Sedmák 20; Rebs: Dorazil 7 Asts: Milošević 7

Boråshallen, Borås
Attendance: 950
Referees: Janusz Calik (POL), Sigmundur Herbertsson (ISL), Henri Hilke (FIN)

27 August 2014
19:00

Boxscore

Romania	70–82	Latvia
Scoring by quarter: 16–22, 21–15, 18–27, 15–18
Pts: Silvășan, Moldoveanu 18; Rebs: Nicoara 6 Asts: Paul 5		Pts: Blūms 15; Rebs: Freimanis 10; Asts: Janičenoks 5

Sala Transilvania, Sibiu
Attendance: 2,000
Referees: Zoran Šutulović (MNE), Borys Shulga (UKR), Petros Papapetrou (GRE)

=== Group G ===
Team	Pld	W	L	PF	PA	PD	Pts
Italy	4	3	1	303	260	+43	7
Russia	4	2	2	313	268	+45	6
Switzerland	4	1	3	260	348	−88	5

10 August 2014
16:00

Boxscore

Switzerland	79–77	Russia
Scoring by quarter: 21–22, 21–15, 24–10, 13–30
Pts: D. Mlađan 24; Rebs: Capela 7 Asts: Cotture 4		Pts: Kurbanov 13; Rebs: Mozgov 7 Asts: Antonov 4

BCF-Arena, Fribourg
Attendance: 1,800
Referees: Joseph Bissang (FRA), Christof Madinger (GER), Keith Williams (ENG)

13 August 2014
19:00

Boxscore

Russia	63–65	Italy
Scoring by quarter: 14–12, 14–13, 23–18, 12–22
Pts: Mozgov 17; Rebs: Mozgov 10; Asts: Khvostov 3		Pts: Gentile 20; Rebs: Datome 8 Asts: Gentile, Cinciarini 2

Basketball Center of Moscow Region, Moscow
Attendance: 2,000
Referees: Ilija Belošević (SRB), Sašo Petek (SLO), Tomislav Hordov (CRO)

17 August 2014
20:30

Boxscore

Italy	90–60	Switzerland
Scoring by quarter: 22–8, 22–15, 23–24, 23–13
Pts: Gentile, Aradori 17; Rebs: Cusin 8 Asts: Cinciarini 6		Pts: D. Mlađan 18; Rebs: M. Mlađan 6 Asts: Savoy 3

Pala Rockefeller, Cagliari
Attendance: 3,000
Referees: Dragan Nešković (SRB), Regis Bardera (FRA), Tomislav Vovk (CRO)

20 August 2014
19:00

Boxscore

Russia	101–56	Switzerland
Scoring by quarter: 30–20, 22–9, 21–13, 28–14
Pts: Sokolov, Zubkov 15; Rebs: Kurbanov 13; Asts: Ponkrashov 12		Pts: M. Mlađan 16; Rebs: M. Mlađan 7 Asts: Mafuta 3

Basketball Center of Moscow Region, Moscow
Attendance: 2,500
Referees: Zoran Šutulović (MNE), Gintaras Vitkauskas (LTU), Andris Aunkrogers (LAT)

24 August 2014
20:30

Boxscore

Italy	68–72	Russia
Scoring by quarter: 19–17, 17–19, 14–11, 18–25
Pts: Gentile 23; Rebs: Datome, Aradori 6 Asts: three players 2		Pts: Ponkrashov 22; Rebs: three players 7 Asts: Ponkrashov 8

Pala Rockefeller, Cagliari
Attendance: 4,000
Referees: Vicente Bulto (ESP), Christos Christodoulou (GRE), Uroš Obrknežević (SRB)

27 August 2014
20:45

Boxscore

Switzerland	65–80	Italy
Scoring by quarter: 15–28, 14–20, 15–19, 21–13
Pts: M. Mlađan 21; Rebs: M. Mlađan 10; Asts: Kazadi 4		Pts: Datome 24; Rebs: Cusin 8 Asts: Gentile 3

Centro Sportivo Bellinzona, Bellinzona
Attendance: 2,400
Referees: Antonio Conde (ESP), Renaud Geller (BEL), Paulo Marques (POR)

=== Ranking of second-placed teams ===
The six best second-placed teams from the groups qualified directly for the tournament. In order to determine them, the results from the games against the fourth-placed teams in each of the groups of four teams were removed from the ranking process.

Team	W	L	PF	PA	G.AVG
Macedonia	3	1	289	272	1.062
Russia	2	2	313	268	1.167
Germany	2	2	308	289	1.065
Iceland	2	2	286	289	0.989
Czech Republic	2	2	282	286	0.986
Netherlands	2	2	250	264	0.946
Romania	2	2	300	328	0.914

=== Top Performers ===
Day	Player	PIR	Ref.
1	(Iceland) Haukur Pálsson	35	
2	(Bosnia and Herzegovina) Mirza Teletović	30	
3	(Israel) D'or Fischer	33	
4	(Austria) Rašid Mahalbašić	34	
5	(Germany) Dennis Schröder (Georgia (country)) Tornike Shengelia	32	
6	(Belgium) Axel Hervelle	35	
