= Lærke (name) =

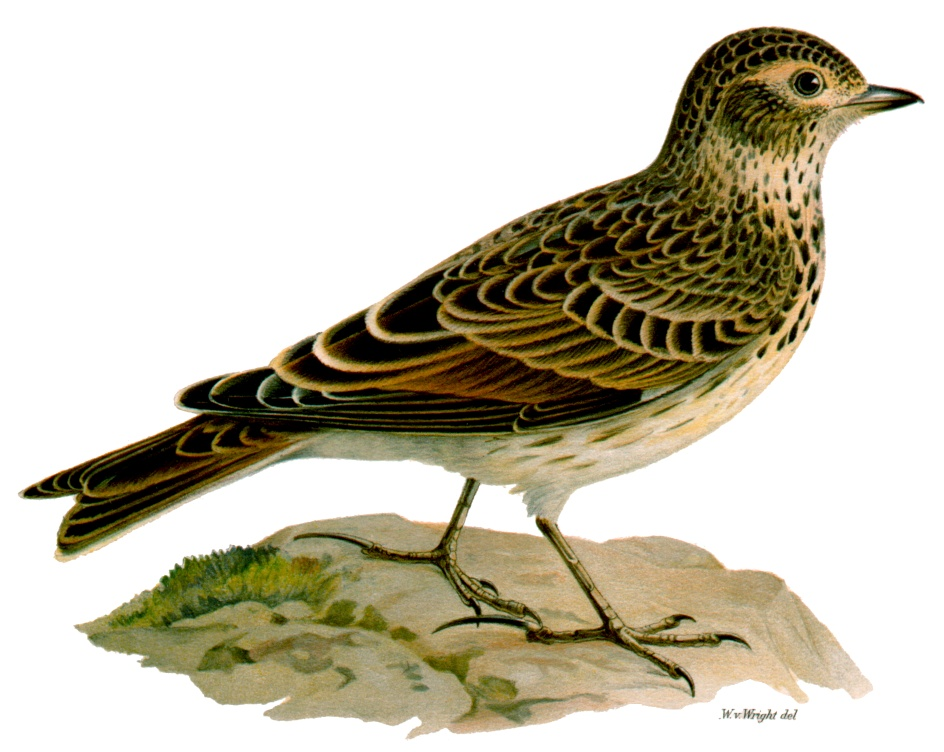
- The name Lærke is taken from the Danish word for the Lark.
- Gender: female

Origin
- Origin: Danish
- Meaning: "lark"
- Region of origin: Denmark

Other names
- Related names: Lark

Lærke is a Danish feminine given name and surname meaning "lark". It was ranked as the fourth most popular given name for girls born in Denmark in 2009, rising from 10th place in 2008.

Notable people with the given name include:

- Lærke Winther Andersen (1975-), Danish actress
- Lærke Buhl-Hansen (1992-), Danish sailor
- Lærke Christensen (1996-), Danish handballer
- Lærke Møller (1989-), Danish handballer
- Lærke Nolsøe (1996-), Danish handballer
- Lærke Olsen (1998-), Danish judoka
- Lærke Sørensen (1998-), Danish handballer

Notable people with the surname include:

- Thomas Lærke (1991-), Danish basketball player
