= Spandau 3 =

State electoral district of Germany

- Electoral district for the Berlin House of Representatives
- Spandau 3 in 2026
- District: Spandau
- Electorate: 33,630 (2026)

Current electoral district
- Party: The Left
- Member: Thomas Wulfes

Spandau 3 is an electoral constituency (German: Wahlkreis) represented in the House of Representatives of Berlin. It elects one member via first-past-the-post voting.

== Geography ==
The constituency comprises the areas of northern Wilhelmstadt, Tiefwerder, Haselhorst, and Siemensstadt, within the borough of Spandau.

There were 33,630 eligible voters in 2026.

== Members ==
Election	Member	Party	%
1999	Carsten-Michael Röding	CDU	52.3
2001	Daniel Buchholz	SPD	42.2
2006	Daniel Buchholz	SPD	42.0
2011	Daniel Buchholz	SPD	41.8
2016	Daniel Buchholz	SPD	35.7
2021	Stephan Machulik	SPD	29.2
2023	Kerstin Brauner	CDU	34.4
2026	Thomas Wulfes	Left	21.3

== Election results ==
=== 2026 election ===
State election (2026): Spandau 3
Notes:	Blue background denotes the winner of the electorate vote. Pink background denotes a candidate elected from their party list. Yellow background denotes an electorate win by a list member, or other incumbent. A ✓ or ✗ denotes status of any incumbent, win or lose respectively.						
Party	Candidate	Votes	%	±%	Party votes	%	±%
Left	Thomas Wulfes	4,569	21.3	▲15.8	4,745	21.8	▲15.9
CDU	✗ Kerstin Brauner	4,327	20.1	▼14.3	4,170	19.2	▼15.2
AfD	Christian Müller	4,281	19.9	▲8.8	4,282	19.7	▲8.9
SPD	Stephan Machulik	3,696	17.2	▼6.7	3,208	14.8	▼6.5
Greens	Gollaleh Ahmadi	2,104	9.8	▼2.7	2,063	9.5	▼2.7
BSW	Christian Haß	1,164	5.4		1,294	5.9	
Tierschutzpartei					636	2.9	▼0.8
FDP	Leonardo Eshraghi	595	2.8	▼1.2	620	2.9	▼1.7
Volt	Philipp Aurich	385	1.8		317	1.5	▲1.0
PARTEI	Rhavin Grobert	379	1.8	▼0.2	216	1.0	▼0.5
PdF					84	0.4	
ÖDP					51	0.2	▲0.1
du.					30	0.1	Steady
DKP					22	0.1	Steady
SGP					10	0.0	Steady
Informal votes		560			312		
Total valid votes		21,500			21,748		
Turnout		22,060	65.6	▲12.2			
Left gain from CDU	Majority	242	1.2				

=== 2023 repeat election ===
Changes denoted below for the 2023 election are compared to the 2016 election, as the 2021 election was declared invalid.

State election (2023): Spandau 3
Notes:	Blue background denotes the winner of the electorate vote. Pink background denotes a candidate elected from their party list. Yellow background denotes an electorate win by a list member, or other incumbent. A ✓ or ✗ denotes status of any incumbent, win or lose respectively.						
Party	Candidate	Votes	%	±%	Party votes	%	±%
CDU	Kerstin Brauner	5,897	34.4	▲11.8	5,889	34.4	▲13.0
SPD	Stephan Machulik	4,095	23.9	▼11.2	3,642	21.2	▼7.3
Greens	Gollaleh Ahmadi	2,141	12.5	▲4.2	2,082	12.1	▲2.7
AfD	Lukas Korus	1,898	11.1	▼5.5	1,858	10.8	▼5.4
Left	Hans-Ulrich Riedel	936	5.5	▼1.6	1,016	5.9	▼1.7
Tierschutzpartei	Sophia Christin Reitter	824	4.8		640	3.7	▲1.2
FDP	Leonardo Eshraghi	682	4.0	▼2.7	776	4.5	▼2.5
PARTEI	Rhavin Grobert	341	2.0		255	1.5	▼0.1
Gray Panthers					122	0.7	▼0.9
Team Todenhöfer					120	0.7	
dieBasis	Philipp Zühlke	163	1.0		119	0.7	
Independent	Bernd Hinz	153	0.9				
The Grays					105	0.6	
Pirates					89	0.5	▼1.2
Volt					86	0.5	
Mieterpartei					61	0.4	
Verjüngungsforschung					48	0.3	▼0.3
Humanists					35	0.2	
FW					33	0.2	
Bildet Berlin!					26	0.2	
ÖDP					25	0.1	
Klimaliste					23	0.1	
du.					22	0.1	
NPD					22	0.1	▼0.4
The Pinks/Alliance 21					15	0.1	
LKR					10	0.1	▼0.3
DKP					9	0.1	Steady
Bergpartei, die ÜberPartei					7	0.0	
SGP					7	0.0	Steady
BüSo					2	0.0	Steady
Informal votes		190			153		
Total valid votes		17,130			17,144		
Turnout		17,337	53.4	▼7.7			
CDU gain from SPD	Majority	1,802	10.5				

=== 2021 election (annulled) ===
The election in 2021 was annulled and rerun in 2023.

State election (2021): Spandau 3
Notes:	Blue background denotes the winner of the electorate vote. Pink background denotes a candidate elected from their party list. Yellow background denotes an electorate win by a list member, or other incumbent. A ✓ or ✗ denotes status of any incumbent, win or lose respectively.						
Party	Candidate	Votes	%	±%	Party votes	%	±%
SPD	Stephan Machulik	6,288	29.2	▼5.9	5,441	25.2	▼3.3
CDU	Kerstin Brauner	4,800	22.3	▼0.3	4,837	22.4	▲1.1
Greens	Gollaleh Ahmadi	2,912	13.5	▲5.2	2,881	13.4	▲3.9
AfD	Lukas Korus	2,188	10.2	▼6.4	2,097	9.7	▼6.6
FDP	Leonardo Eshraghi	1,615	7.5	▲0.8	1,616	7.5	▲0.5
Left	Hans-Ulrich Riedel	1,458	6.8	▼0.3	1,501	7.0	▼0.7
Tierschutzpartei	Sophia Christin Reitter	1,109	5.2		650	3.0	▲0.4
Team Todenhöfer					467	2.2	
PARTEI	Rhavin Grobert	568	2.6		411	1.9	▲0.3
dieBasis	Philipp Zühlke	391	1.8		248	1.1	
The Grays					204	0.9	
Independent	Bernd Hinz	190	0.9				
FW					180	0.8	
Gray Panthers					173	0.8	▼0.8
APT					142	0.7	
Pirates					131	0.6	▼1.2
Volt					128	0.6	
Mieterpartei					84	0.4	
Verjüngungsforschung					67	0.3	▼0.3
Humanists					46	0.2	
du.					42	0.2	
Klimaliste					40	0.2	
ÖDP					37	0.2	
Bildet Berlin!					30	0.1	
NPD					29	0.1	▼0.4
The Pinks/Alliance 21					28	0.1	
LKR					19	0.1	▼0.3
DKP					15	0.1	Steady
Bergpartei, die ÜberPartei					14	0.1	
BüSo					9	0.0	Steady
SGP					6	0.0	▼0.1
Informal votes		422			309		
Total valid votes		21,519			21,573		
Turnout		22,094	68.4	▲7.3			
SPD hold	Majority	1,488	6.9				

== See also ==
- Politics of Berlin
- House of Representatives of Berlin
