= Adrian Tudor =

Romanian basketball player

No. 22 – Piteşti
- Position: Point guard
- League: Liga Națională

Personal information
- Born: 13 March 1985 (age 41) Constanta, Romania
- Listed height: 6 ft 1 in (1.85 m)

Career information
- Playing career: 2004–present

Career history
- 2015-present: BCM U Pitesti

Adrian Tudor (born 13 March 1985) is a Romanian professional basketball player. He currently plays for the BCM U Pitesti club of the Liga Națională.

He represented Romania's national basketball team at the 2015 Eurobasket qualification, where he recorded most assists for his team.
