= Dejan Ivanov =

Bulgarian basketball player

Personal information
- Born: 18 March 1986 (age 40) Varna, Bulgaria
- Listed height: 2.05 m (6 ft 9 in)
- Listed weight: 103 kg (227 lb)

Career information
- NBA draft: 2008: undrafted
- Playing career: 2003–2019
- Position: Power forward

Career history
- 2003–2004: Levski Sofia
- 2004–2005: Avtodor Saratov
- 2005–2006: Cherno More Varna
- 2006: Cajasol
- 2006–2007: Menorca Bàsquet
- 2007–2008: Split
- 2008–2009: Zadar
- 2009–2012: Sutor Basket Montegranaro
- 2012–2013: Lietuvos rytas
- 2013: Cimberio Varese
- 2013–2014: CB Estudiantes
- 2014: Enel Brindisi
- 2014–2015: Juvecaserta Basket
- 2015: Auxilium CUS Torino
- 2015–2016: Yeşilgiresun Belediye
- 2016: Bucaneros de La Guaira
- 2016: Gaziantep
- 2016–2017: Yeşilgiresun Belediye
- 2017–2018: Pistoia Basket
- 2018–2019: Levski Sofia

Dejan Ivanov (born 18 March 1986) is a Bulgarian former professional basketball player who last played for Levski Sofia of the Bulgarian NBL. He is also a longtime member of the Bulgarian national team. He is Kaloyan's twin brother.
