= Thomas Okos =

German politician (born 1988)

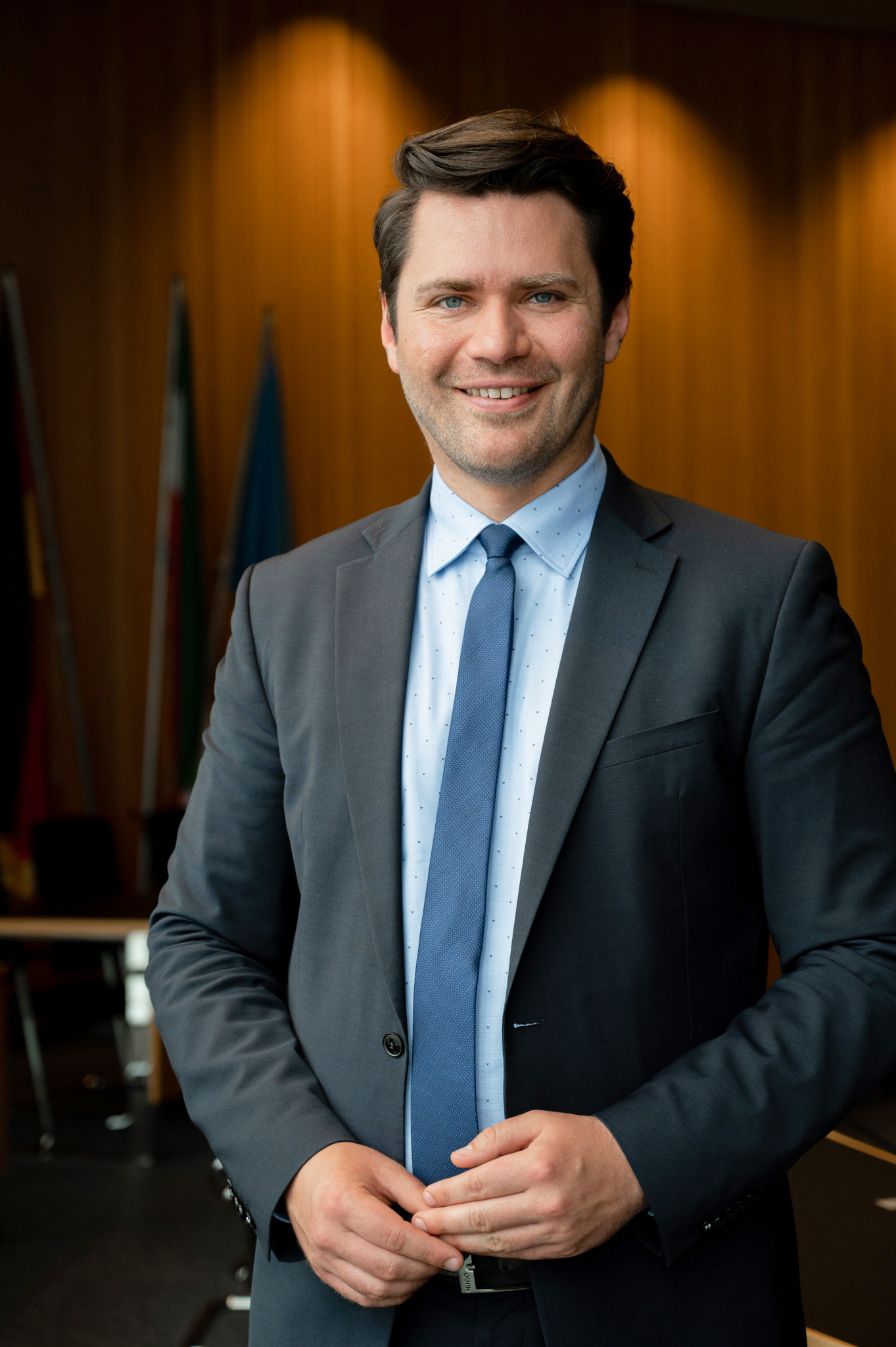
- Okos in 2023

Member of the Landtag of North Rhine-Westphalia
- Incumbent
- Assumed office 1 June 2022
- Preceded by: Frank Rock
- Constituency: Rhein-Erft-Kreis II

Personal details
- Born: 17 June 1988 (age 38)
- Party: Christian Democratic Union (since 2008)

Thomas Okos (born 17 June 1988) is a German politician serving as a member of the Landtag of North Rhine-Westphalia since 2022. He has served as chairman of the Christian Democratic Union in Frechen since 2019.
