= Thomas M. Eastwick =

American educator

- Born: c. 1952
- Education: St. John's University
- Occupations: Educator; Philanthropist
- Years active: 1984–present
- Title: Founder and president, Eastwick College

Thomas M. Eastwick (born c. 1952) is an American educator and philanthropist who founded Eastwick College and the HoHoKus School of Trade and Technical Sciences in northern New Jersey.

== Biography ==
Eastwick was born in 1952. He completed his undergraduate studies at St John’s University in Queens, New York in the early 1970s.

After his graduation, Eastwick briefly worked for the National Education Corporation.

Since founding the first campus in 1984, Eastwick has remained president of Eastwick Colleges and several affiliated training schools. Outside the college administration, Eastwick has served on regional workforce bodies, including as a founding board member of the Bergen County Workforce Investment Board (now the Workforce Development Board).

In 2007, Eastwick created the Eastwick Foundation, a 501(c)(3) that funds student scholarships and community food-security projects. In 2015, he made a gift to Meals-on-Wheels program. In 2022, he made a gift to Bergen New Bridge Medical Center during the rededication of "Eastwick Grove," recognizing his decade of service on the hospital’s board of trustees.

Eastwick resides in Pearl River, Rockland County, New York, with his family.

== Awards and recognition ==
- Humanitarian of the Year, Mahwah Regional Chamber of Commerce (2014)
- Legacy Award, Meadowlands Regional Chamber (2016)
- New Jersey History Maker, Bergen County Historical Society “Raise the Roof” Gala (2024)
