= Thomas J. Brown =

Thomas J. Brown may refer to:

- Thomas J. Brown (bishop of Maine) (born 1970), American Episcopal bishop
- Thomas J. Brown (writer) (1867–1926), Canadian mining official and writer
- Thomas Jefferson Brown (1836–1915), Chief Justice of the Supreme Court of Texas
- Thomas James Brown (1886–1970), British coal miner and Labour Party politician
- Thomas John Brown (born 1943), Anglican bishop in New Zealand
- T. J. Brown (baseball), American Negro league shortstop

== See also ==
- Thomas Brown (disambiguation)
