= Thomas Joseph Wynne =

American-Irish photographer and shopkeeper

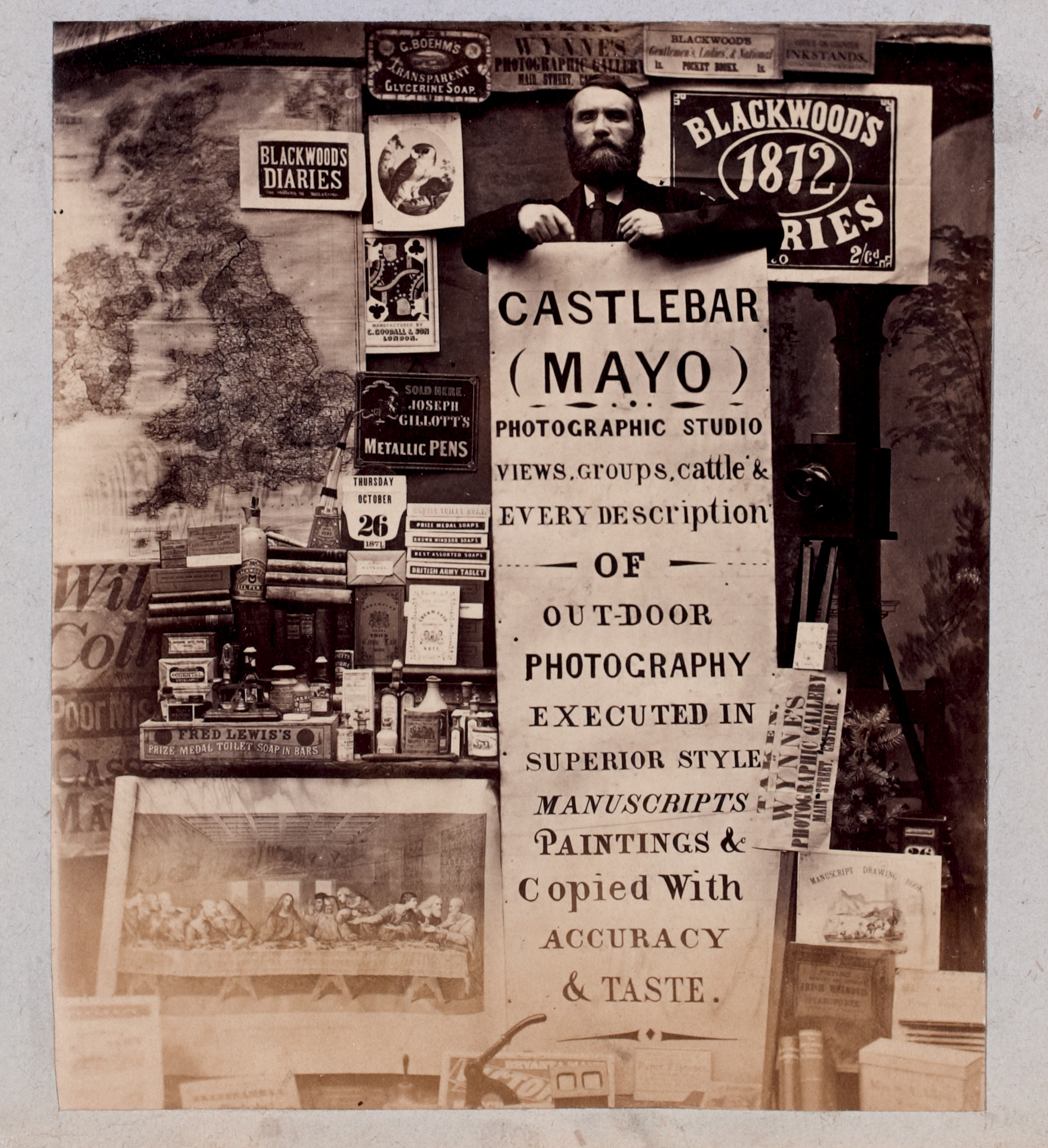
- Born: 1838
- Died: 26 October 1893 (aged 55); Castlebar, Mayo, Ireland
- Resting place: Castlebar, Mayo, Ireland
- Known for: Studio photographs and outdoor photographs of the topography and people of counties Mayo and Galway in the nineteenth century
- Spouse: Ellen Semple (m. 1860) Margaret Fox (1841–1913) (m. 1863)

Thomas Joseph Wynne (1838 – 26 October 1893) was an American–Irish photographer and shopkeeper, best known for his nineteenth-century photographs of the west of Ireland.

== Early life ==
Wynne was born in 1838, probably in the United States to an Irish-American mother (the third daughter of Richard MacEvilly from county Mayo) and an unknown father and it is thought he grew up in the United States. By 1860, Wynne had returned to his Irish roots in the west of Ireland and on 4 August 1860 he married Ellen Semple in the Roman Catholic church in Castlebar, county Mayo. Ellen died in 1862, her death attributed to complications in giving birth to their only son John William Wynne (12 July 1861–).

In 1861, Wynne established a stationery shop and news agency in Castlebar, county Mayo, moving premises in 1864 and gradually expanding to include a tourist travel service, a lending library and bookshop, a newspaper delivery service, and eventually an auction service in 1886.

On 2 November 1863, Wynne married Margaret Fox (1841–1913), a Mayo woman, and they had five daughters and five sons together, some of whom continued Wynne's photography business.

== Photography ==
In 1867 Wynne established a photography studio at his shop in Castlebar and the quality of his photographs suggest he may have received formal training in photography but not further information is known. Wynne did a variety of types of photography including studio portraits, commissions, event photography including weddings and sports events, and photographs of urban and rural life. He sold individual print photographs as well as albums.

By 1877, Wynne's photography business was sufficiently successful that he advertised for a "photographic artists" to act as an assistant to his photographic business. In the advertisement, Wynne listed himself as "photographer, stationer, bookseller, and general newsagent." Wynne employed various assistants for colouring photographs and also trained at least three of his children in photography—including one of his daughters—but ultimately took most of the Wynne studio photographs himself. Possibly unusually for the time, in June 1887, Wynne advertised a situation vacant for a "a Lady having good knowledge of Retouching and Spotting."

In late September 1884, Wynne was advertising "splendid photos" of the wreck of the gunboat HMS Wasp, which had sunk on reefs near Tory Island, off the north-west coast of County Donegal, with the death of 52 crew members.

Wynne died on 26 October 1893, aged 55, in Castlebar and is buried in the old churchyard in the town. He left his estate to his second wife Margaret and it is believed she carried on the stationary side of the business after his death.

== Legacy ==
Wynne's youngest son, Richard James Wynne (1878–1965), continued the shop and photographic studio in Castlebar. His other sons established photographic businesses elsewhere in Ireland—in Limerick, Tipperary, and Portarlington. One of his daughters, Mary Hannon (née Wynne) (1864–1925), established a photographic studio in Loughrea, Galway in the 1890s and was also a member of the Irish Literary Society.

After 147 years in business, Wynne's of Castlebar—now a newsagent but still run by descendants of Wynne—closed its doors in June 2011.

A significant number of Wynne's photographs have survived in various collections in Ireland including Mayo county library, the National Library of Ireland, and the Source Photographic Archives. Mayo county library holds a collection presented by the Wynne family including 3,000 prints by Wynne and his children. The National Library of Ireland holds the Wynne Collection and the Wynne album, a captioned albumen prints featuring the topography and people of counties Mayo and Galway, both presented by the Wynne family. The Wynne Collections includes 4725 original glass negatives, numerous prints and albums, and the Wynne shop and studio day books from 1898 to 1935 and 1938–1966. Some of Wynne's photographs have been digitised.

Wynne's surviving photographs offer a unique insight into the social history of the west of Ireland in the late 1800s, an eventful period that is not especially well documented photographically, "a major heritage of national as well as local significance."
