= Thomas Baumert =

German-French physician-scientist (born 1965)

Thomas F. Baumert
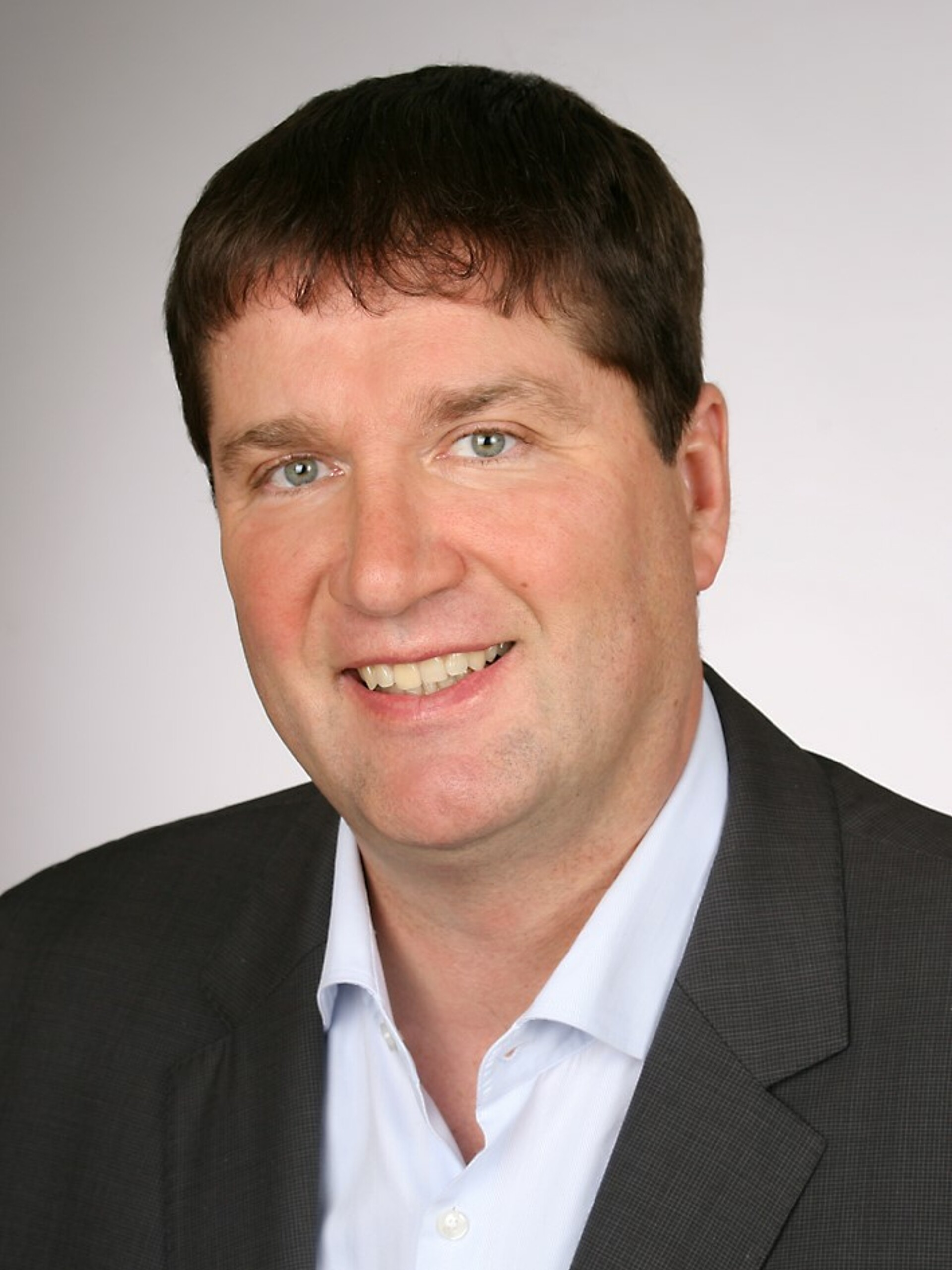
- Alma mater: University of Freiburg, Heidelberg University
- Born: 20 May 1965 in Berlin, Germany
- Nationality: German and French
- Family: Married, 2 children

Thomas Baumert (born May 20, 1965) is a German-French physician-scientist and entrepreneur. He is a Professor of Medicine at the University of Strasbourg and the Chief of the Gastroenterology-Hepatology Service at the Strasbourg University Hospitals. He is the founder of Alentis Therapeutics, a clinical-stage biotech company in Basel. He works on the basic, translational, and clinical investigation of liver disease and cancer.

Baumert and his teams have discovered and developed novel strategies to treat fibrosis and cancer. He has published more than 400 scientific articles including in The New England Journal of Medicine, Cell, Nature, and Science Translational Medicine. His work has been recognized by several awards and honors, including the Galien Prize and the Inserm Research Award.

== Education ==
Baumert studied medicine at the University of Freiburg and Heidelberg University, the University of Chicago, and at the Baylor College of Medicine. On completing a doctoral thesis at the German Cancer Research Center (DKFZ) in Heidelberg, and a medicine internship at LMU Munich, Baumert received his MD degree from Heidelberg University. He then moved to America to become a fellow at Harvard Medical School. He returned to Germany to join the Department of Medicine at the University Hospital in Freiburg, where he qualified as a board-certified internist and gastroenterologist. He later moved to Strasbourg in France, where he became a full Professor of Medicine at the University of Strasbourg where he created a new Inserm research unit, and started a research program in translational hepatology.

== Scientific contributions ==
=== Scientific career ===
Thomas Baumert began his scientific career as an MD student in the laboratory of Dietrich Keppler, MD at the German Cancer Research Center (DKFZ). At the DKFZ, he worked out how leukotrienes that are degraded in the liver contribute to alcoholic liver disease. Following a clinical internship at the LMU Klinikum, he completed a postdoctoral fellowship studying viral liver disease where he worked out how defined acquired mutations in the genome of hepatitis B virus contribute to liver disease and discovered and developed a vaccine candidate to prevent hepatitis C virus infection. Subsequently, he joined the University Hospital Freiburg under the leadership of Hubert E. Blum, MD where he created an EU-funded research group focusing on the viral pathogenesis of liver disease.

During his tenure at Inserm and at the University of Strasbourg, he has identified key host liver factors for hepatitis viruses as drivers and targets for virus-induced liver disease and cancer, and the explained the crucial role of virus-specific antibodies for clearance and control of hepatitis C virus infection. He was trusted with the organization and hosting of the 22nd international symposium on hepatitis C virus and related viruses, in Strasbourg in 2015.

Following a sabbatical at the Broad Institute, the Massachusetts General Hospital and the Harvard Medical School in 2014, he built a new program on the investigation of the cell circuits of liver disease and cancer, using novel patient-derived models combined with scRNASeq and integrative computational analyses. Using perturbation studies combined with integrative systems biology he and his team showed that chronic viral or metabolic liver injury results in epigenetic footprints in patients with advanced liver disease driving and predicting liver fibrosis progression and cancer risk.

Using patient-derived liver models combined with scRNASeq and the first human liver single cell atlas established by his team with external collaborators Baumert and his team uncovered novel approaches to treat fibrosis and prevent cancer, which led to his discovery of the cell surface protein Claudin-1 as a previously unknown mediator and therapeutic target for fibrosis and cancer across organs. Using hepatitis C virus entering cancer cells as a model system, he discovered and developed a unique panel monoclonal antibodies targeting exposed Claudin-1 on epithelial cells to treat fibrosis across organs and cancer. Baumert and his team showed that therapeutic antibodies targeting exposed Claudin-1 on the cancer cell surface efficiently inhibit liver tumor growth by changing cell plasticity, suppressing carcinogenic signaling and reprogramming the tumor immune microenvironment.

=== Research programs ===
His research programs have received support from European and international funding bodies including the European Research Council (ERC), the German, and French Research Foundations and the US National Institutes of Health including NCI, NIDDK and NIAID. He was awarded several ERC Advanced Grants (AdG) and Proof of Concept Grants (PoC).

Baumert has led over 50 research programs in liver disease and cancer and mentored 40+ PhD and MD/PhD students, 50+ fellows, and 20+ faculty members. He is leading the RHU DELIVER program – a consortium gathering academia, hospitals, and pharmaceutical companies funded by the French Research Agency ANR to improve the care of patients with advanced liver disease.

== Entrepreneurship ==
The translational and commercial impact of his research is reflected by more than 25 patent applications for novel therapeutic approaches in the last ten years, leading to multiple partnerships and collaborations with pharmaceutical industries and the creation of biotech companies in France and Switzerland. In 2019, Thomas Baumert founded Alentis Therapeutics, a clinical-stage, venture-backed biotech based in Switzerland, developing monoclonal antibodies discovered with his team in his laboratory to treat fibrosis and cancer.
