= Nick Oudendag =

Dutch professional basketball player (born 1987)

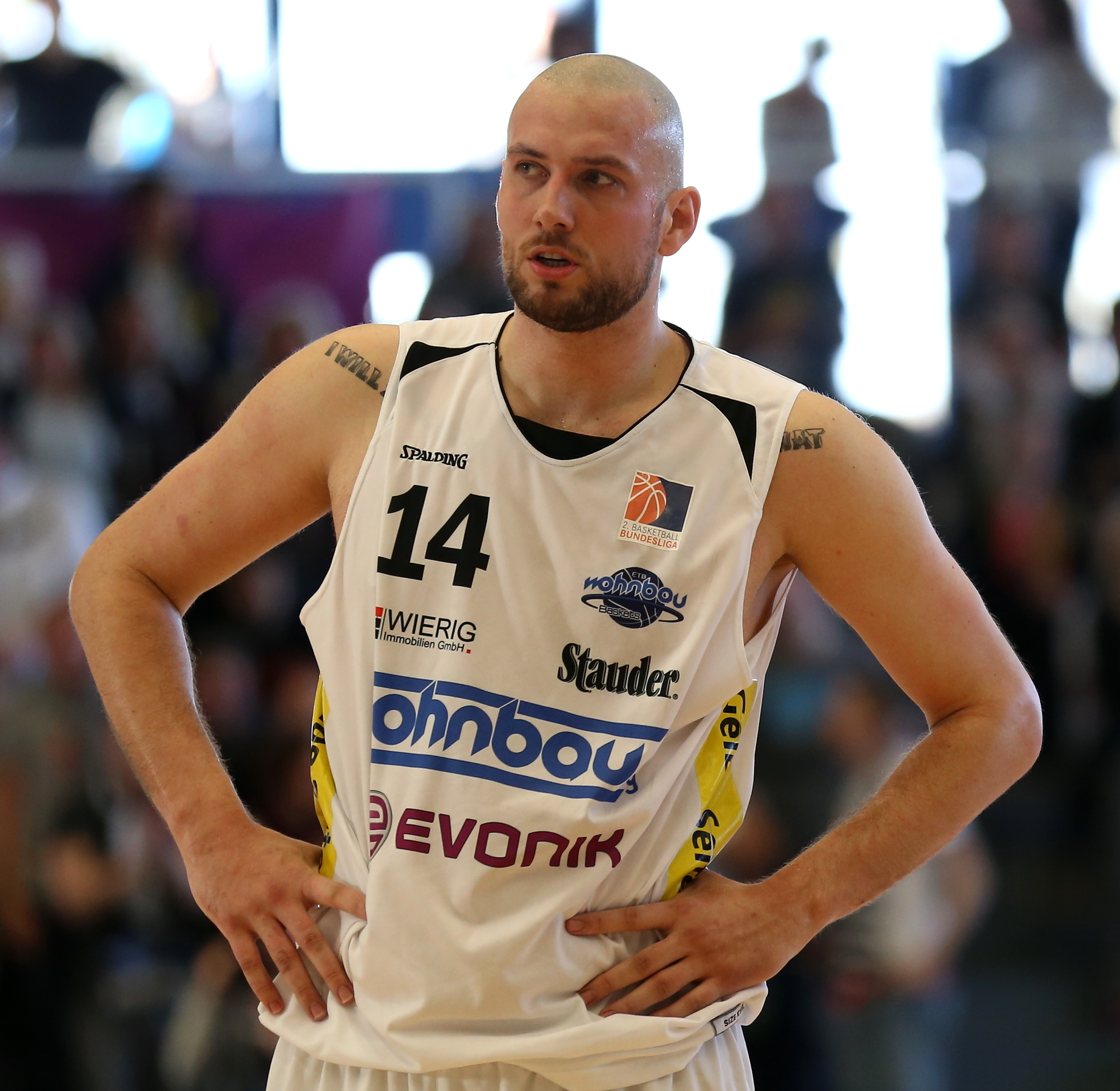
- Oudendag with ETB Wohnbau Baskets in 2015

Personal information
- Born: 23 April 1987 (age 39) Zevenaar, Netherlands
- Listed height: 2.11 m (6 ft 11 in)
- Listed weight: 109 kg (240 lb)

Career information
- NBA draft: 2003: undrafted
- Playing career: 2003–2019
- Position: Center
- Number: 12, 14, 18

Career history
- 2003–2004: Matrixx Magixx
- 2004–2006: Den Helder Seals
- 2006: Omniworld Almere
- 2006–2007: Matrixx Magixx
- 2007–2009: Antwerp Giants
- 2009–2011; 2012: Matrixx Magixx
- 2012: Rotterdam
- 2012–2014: Matrixx Magixx
- 2015: ETB Schwarz-Weiß
- 2015: Aurore de Vitre
- 2016–2017: Landstede Zwolle
- 2017–2019: Den Bosch

Nick Andreas Maria Oudendag (born 23 April 1987) is a Dutch former basketball player. Standing at 6 ft 11 in (2.11 m), he played as center. During his career, Oudendag was a member of the Netherlands national team.

== Professional career ==
He has played most of his career with the Dutch team Matrixx Magixx, as he had 5 different stances with the team from Nijmegen and Wijchen. In September 2014, Oudendag signed a contract with the Bosnian team KK Igokea. However, he was released quickly. In January 2015, he signed a contract with the German ProA team ETB Wohnbau Baskets.

In August 2016, he signed with Landstede Basketbal. In June 2017, New Heroes Den Bosch signed Oudendag to a two-year contract.

== National team career ==
Oudendag also plays for the Dutch national team, he was selected for the squad in 2009 and 2014. He was one of the key players for the team that qualified for Holland's first FIBA EuroBasket tournament in 25 years. Oudendag averaged 10 points and 8.3 rebounds per game during the 2015 qualifying rounds. Oudendag was not selected for the EuroBasket 2015 team.
