= Thomas Jackson (abolitionist) =

Biography of Thomas Jackson, a British abolitionist

Thomas Jackson (1807–1878) was born in Britain but emigrated to the United States in 1829 and continued his trade as a rope maker operating out of Reading, Pennsylvania. While on a visit to Richmond, he stumbled upon a slave market; this experience led to him becoming an outspoken critic of slavery and racial inequality in the years leading up to the Civil War. His editorials criticizing slavery and its supporters appeared in provincial American and English periodicals. These original handwritten primary sources are now housed at the Library of Congress, where they will be curated for posterity. Since Thomas Jackson's collection of writings was rediscovered in 2000, researchers have also worked to make this collection more accessible to the public by transcribing the letters and uploading the digitized documents to the website, thomasjacksonletters.com. The Library of Congress recognizes that this website provides additional information to the original manuscript letters and saves versions of the developing website over time.

== Early years ==
Thomas Jackson was born on 4 February 1807 to Ann and John Jackson in Ilkeston, England. John Jackson, by occupation, was a rope maker who came of age during the 18th-century British movement for reform. The movement emerged during the 1760s through 1780s as a result of the national debt incurred by Britain after the Seven Years War. This debt led to the 1764 Sugar Act and the 1765 Stamp Act being imposed in British colonies and plantations in America which in turn led to resistance among the British colonies.

John Jackson also became involved in the radical republican movement that spread throughout Europe and the Americas in the 1790s during the French Revolution. There is evidence from his 1794 trial showing his direct involvement with reformist agitation for which he faced jail time and the pillory for distributing pamphlets critical of King George III. As a result of his imprisonment, he faced near bankruptcy.

=== Emigrating to the United States ===
Thomas Jackson and his brother, Edward, emigrated to the United States in 1829. Together they established the Jackson Rope Company, a rope manufacturer operating along the Schuylkill Canal in Reading, Pennsylvania.

By 1834, slavery had been abolished across the British Empire. From then on, the British abolitionist movement focused its efforts on the international scene, particularly the United States, where over two million people were still held in bondage. British activists who visited the U.S. reported back to the British public the abuses and inhumanity of American slavery. Thomas Jackson eventually became one such activist.

== Abolitionist work ==
In an editorial that appeared in the Ilkeston Pioneer (an English newspaper), Jackson reported witnessing a slave auction for the first time in Richmond, Virginia, in 1833 while on a business trip. He identified this moment as the catalyst that led him to a life of abolitionist work:

More than 33 years ago I emigrated to America, and settled in one of the most prosperous of the free States. I was kindly welcomed and found many good men and kind friends. I had to work hard, but I soon had a good home, acquired property, and was prosperous and happy. I saw nothing of slavery.

My father had never mentioned such a thing as American slavery. I never dreamed that such a thing was possible as liberty and slavery existing together under a free Government, and just laws.

I was too simple to entertain such an idea. Never thought such a thing could be; do not now think it can be; know now it cannot be.

By the 1840s, he had begun writing critiques of slavery that appeared in periodicals in Reading, Pennsylvania, and in English papers in the Birmingham area. Within the transatlantic anti-slavery movement, efforts turned increasingly to steering international trade away from the American South. In writing to English audiences, Thomas Jackson hoped to do his part by dissuading English consumers and businesses from supporting the American cotton trade, the industry with the highest concentration of slave labor.

== Civil War years ==
When the U.S. Civil War began in 1861, Jackson doubled down on efforts to inform the English public about slavery in the U.S., the war, and England's role in the conflict. England might have intervened in the Civil War to protect their economic interests in the south, so Union supporters like Jackson knew it was critical to pressure the English government to remain neutral.

During the Civil War, Jackson amplified his calls to end slavery in the United States, which was not an explicit Union war aim in the early stages of the conflict. Although there is no record of Jackson officially participating in organized abolitionist groups, he showed material support for the movement by participating in anti-slavery lecture tours and employing freedmen at the Jackson Rope Company.

== The Lincoln Assassination and Reconstruction years ==
Thomas Jackson chronicled in detail the assassination of President Abraham Lincoln on April 14, 1865. In addition to mourning the loss of one of American abolitiionism's greatest advocates, Jackson also expressed dismay about the future direction of American society if further acts of southern rebellion went unchecked:

“It is utterly impossible to describe my feelings. Wunder [sic] what next. Appalled at the past and the present, good men stood aghast at the future.”

When the Civil War ended on May 26, 1865, Jackson shifted focus to Reconstruction politics. He disagreed vehemently with President Andrew Johnson's lenient stance towards the former Confederacy–namely in his granting blanket pardons to former soldiers. The Reconstruction Act of 1867 required that rebel states, in order to obtain reentry into the U.S., draft a new state constitution that would give rights to freedmen and abolish the Black Codes. These new state constitutions would need to be approved by the U.S. Congress.

Jackson made this position known in a war of words with Horace Greeley (1811–1872), a prominent Republican supporter of southern amnesty and founder of the New York Tribune. In an exchange published in Greeley's paper on 4 April 1871, Jackson condemned general amnesty for encouraging further southern disloyalty, while Greeley, identifying himself as Editor, accused Jackson of laboring “under evident confusion of mind with regard to the facts” and argued that in fact amnesty was a tool to prevent a future resurgence of rebellion.

Throughout the 1870s, Jackson became further disillusioned by Reconstruction politics. He also faced repeated arson attacks on his business, which he blamed on Confederate sympathizers. Due to declining health, Jackson's activities in the public sphere slowed down markedly compared to previous decades.

== Death and legacy ==
Jackson died in Reading, Pennsylvania on August 6, 1878. His surviving letters and articles are now preserved at the Library of Congress. This collection provides researchers with a valuable grassroots perspective on critical developments in 19th-century U.S. history.

The Jackson Rope Company survived under different ownership until 1979, becoming one of Reading's oldest and longest-lasting production plants.
