= Thomas Lodu =

South Sudanese politician

Thomas Lodu is a South Sudanese politician. He has served as Commissioner of Juba County, Central Equatoria since 2005.
