= Adrian Guțoaia =

Romanian basketball player

No. 44 – Phoenix Galați
- Position: Small forward
- League: Liga Națională

Personal information
- Born: March 10, 1990 (age 36) Galați, Romania
- Listed height: 6 ft 6 in (1.98 m)
- Listed weight: 213 lb (97 kg)

Career information
- Playing career: 2008–present

Career history
- 2008–2010: CSA Steaua București
- 2010–2011: CSU Asesoft Ploiești
- 2011–2012: Energia Rovinari
- 2012–2013: Gaz Metan Mediaş
- 2013–2014: CSU Asesoft Ploiești
- 2014–2015: CSM U Oradea
- 2015–present: Phoenix Galați

Adrian Guțoaia (born March 10, 1990) is a Romanian professional basketball player for Phoenix Galați in Liga Națională.
