= Alexander Bak =

Danish basketball player (born 1991)

Óbila CB
- Position: Small forward
- League: Liga EBA

Personal information
- Born: January 16, 1991 (age 35) Horsholm, Denmark
- Listed height: 1.91 m (6 ft 3 in)

Career information
- Playing career: 2011–present

Career history
- 2011–2013: Horsholm 79ers
- 2013–2014: Copenhagen Wolfpack
- 2014–2016: Team FOG Næstved
- 2016–2017: Svendborg Rabbits
- 2017–2018: Óbila CB
- 2018–2019: Team FOG Næstved
- 2019–2020: Oh!Tels ULB
- 2020–present: Óbila CB

Alexander Bak (born January 16, 1991) is a Danish basketball player for Óbila CB of the Liga EBA. He has also competed for the Denmark national basketball team

In the 2018–19 season he played for Team FOG Næstved and averaged 5.0 points, 2.5 rebounds and 2.7 assists per game. Bak played for Oh!Tels ULB in the 2019–20 season and averaged 13.4 points, 5.0 rebounds and 3.1 assists per game. He signed with Óbila CB on September 24, 2020.
