= Jonas Zohore =

Danish professional basketball player

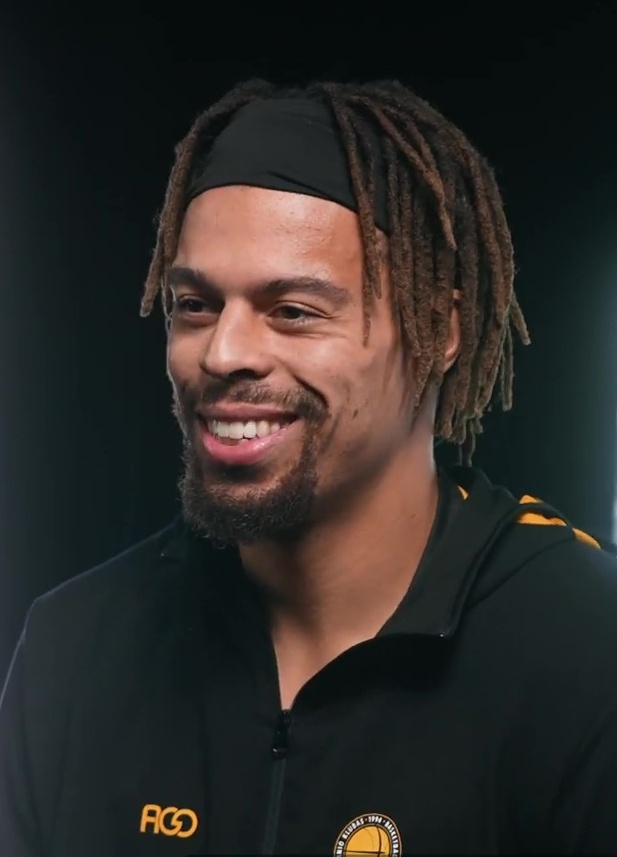
- Bergstedt in 2023

No. 50 – Club Melilla Baloncesto
- Position: Center
- League: Primera FEB

Personal information
- Born: 6 July 1991 (age 35) Copenhagen, Danmark
- Listed height: 2.10 m (6 ft 11 in)
- Listed weight: 120 kg (265 lb)

Career information
- NBA draft: 2013: undrafted
- Playing career: 2008–present

Career history
- 2008–2009: Hørsholm 79ers
- 2010–2012: Espacio Torrelodones
- 2012: ETHA Engomis
- 2013: Nevėžis Kėdainiai
- 2013–2014: Horsens
- 2014–2015: Bakken Bears
- 2015–2016: Okapi Aalstar
- 2016–2017: 5 Stelle Massagno
- 2017–2018: Bergamo Basket
- 2018: Dynamic
- 2018: Egis Körmend
- 2018–2019: Tehetséges Fiatalok
- 2019–2020: Rilski
- 2020–2021: HLA Alicante
- 2021–2022: Spójnia Stargard
- 2022–2023: BC Šiauliai
- 2023–2024: Baxi Manresa
- 2024–2025: Rajawali Medan
- 2025: Tadamon Zouk
- 2026–present: Club Melilla Baloncesto

Jonas Zohore Bergstedt (born 6 July 1991) is a Danish professional basketball player Club Melilla Baloncesto of the Spanish Primera FEB.

== Playing career ==
Zohore played for the ETHA Engomis (Cyprus), Nevėžis Kėdainiai (Lithuania), Okapi Aalstar (Belgium), 5 Stelle Massagno (Switzerland) and Bergamo Basket (Italy). He also played for domestic teams Horsens and the Bakken Bears.

On 30 March 2018, he signed for the Dynamic of the Basketball League of Serbia. Bergstedt left after the end of the 2017–18 season.

On 17 August 2021, he signed with Spójnia Stargard of the Polish Basketball League (PLK).

On 18 September 2023, Zohore signed with Baxi Manresa of the Liga ACB.

On 13 April 2024, Zohore signed with Rajawali Medan of the Indonesian Basketball League (IBL).

On January 29, 2026, he joined Club Melilla Baloncesto in the Primera FEB, the second tier of Spanish basketball.

== National team career ==
Zohore represented Denmark national team at qualifiers for the EuroBasket 2015 and EuroBasket 2017. Jonas played all 26 continuous games from 2015 to 2020. Still playing on the Danish National team to present day.

== Personal life ==
Zohore is of Ivorian descent through his father, and is the second cousin of the Ivorian footballer Didier Drogba.

== See also ==
- List of foreign basketball players in Serbia
