= Peter Sedmák =

Slovak basketball player

Košice
- Position: Power forward / center
- League: Slovak Extraliga

Personal information
- Born: July 8, 1985 (age 41) Poprad, Czechoslovakia
- Listed height: 6 ft 9.5 in (2.07 m)
- Listed weight: 244 lb (111 kg)

Career information
- Playing career: 2002–present

Career history
- 2002–2006: Chemosvit Svit
- 2006: Nový Jičín
- 2006–2007: Chemosvit Svit
- 2007: Nový Jičín
- 2008–2009: Chemosvit Svit
- 2009–2011: Brno
- 2011–2012: USK Praha
- 2012: Děčín
- 2013: Inter Bratislava
- 2013–2014: Balkan Botevgrad
- 2014–2015: Inter Bratislava
- 2015–2016: Baniyas Club
- 2016–2017: Baník Handlová
- 2017: Dynamic Belgrade
- 2017–present: Košice

Peter Sedmák (born July 8, 1985) is a Slovak professional basketball player for the Kingspan Královští sokoli of the Kooperativa NBL.
