= Thomas Wulfes =

German politician (born 1998)

Member of the Berlin House of Representatives
- Assuming office 29 October 2026
- Succeeding: Kerstin Brauner
- Constituency: Spandau 3

Personal details
- Born: 1998 (age 27–28)
- Party: Die Linke (since 2023)

Thomas Wulfes (born 1998) is a German politician who was elected member of the Berlin House of Representatives in 2026. He has served as co-spokesperson of Die Linke in Spandau since 2024.
