= Thomas Ho =

Thomas Ho may refer to:

- Thomas Ho (actor), British actor of Chinese descent
- Thomas Ho (finance), pioneering financial modeller
- Tommy Ho, American former tennis player
- Thomas Heffernan Ho, Hong Kong equestrian

== See also ==
- Ho (surname)
