= Rašid Mahalbašić =

Austrian basketball player (born 1990)

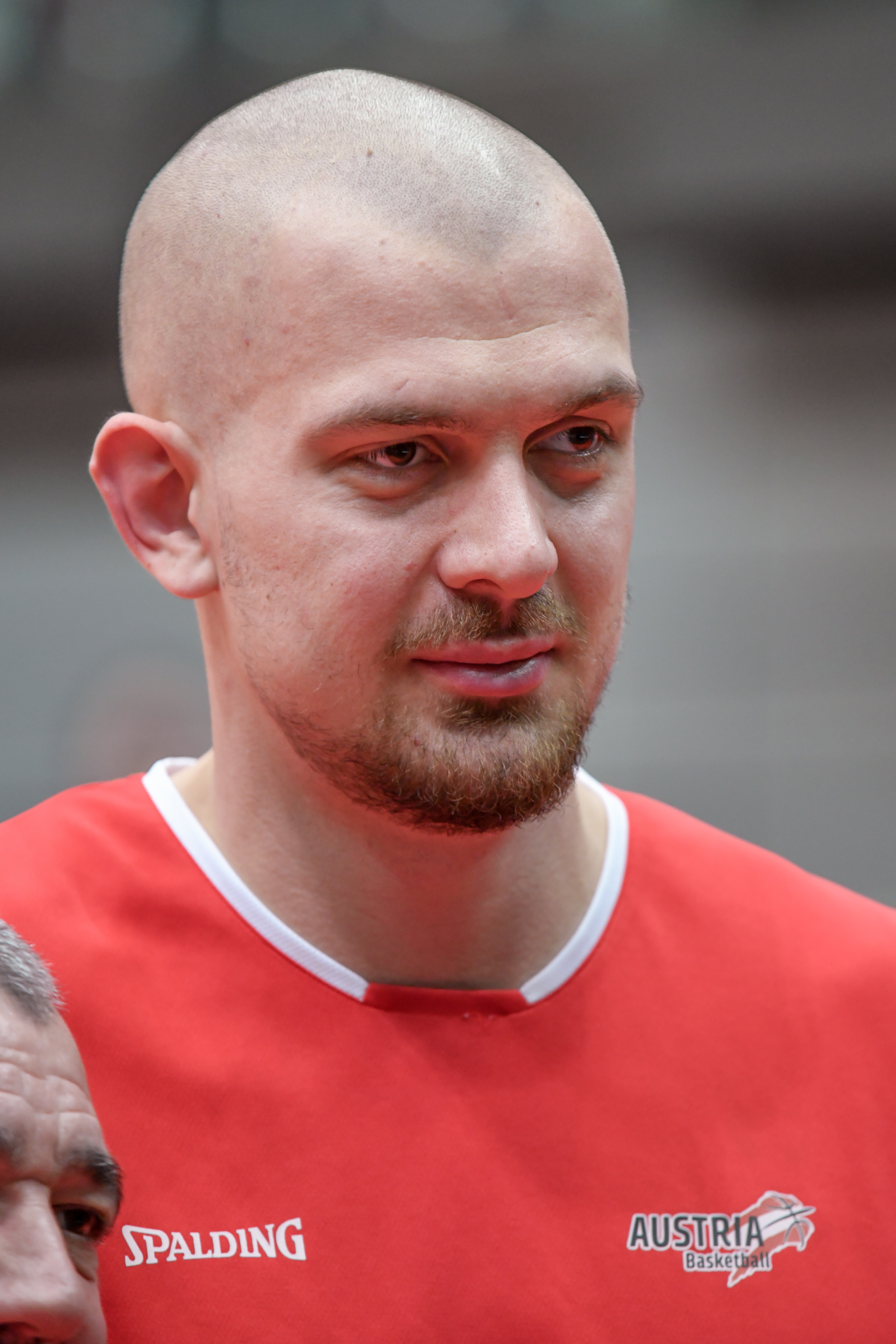
- Mahalbašić playing for the Austrian national team

Lobos de Puebla
- Position: Center / power forward
- League: LNBP

Personal information
- Born: 7 November 1990 (age 36) Jesenice, SR Slovenia, SFR Yugoslavia
- Listed height: 2.11 m (6 ft 11 in)
- Listed weight: 120 kg (265 lb)

Career information
- NBA draft: 2012: undrafted
- Playing career: 2006–present

Career history
- 2006–2010: Wörthersee Piraten
- 2010–2011: Fenerbahçe Ülker
- 2010–2011: →Tofaş
- 2011: →Split
- 2012: Zlatorog Laško
- 2012–2013: Asseco Prokom
- 2013–2014: ČEZ Nymburk
- 2014–2015: Astana
- 2015–2016: Nizhny Novgorod
- 2016: Yeşilgiresun Belediye
- 2016–2017: Real Betis Energía Plus
- 2017–2021: EWE Baskets Oldenburg
- 2021: Monaco
- 2021–2022: Breogán
- 2022–2023: San Pablo Burgos
- 2023: Cedevita Olimpija
- 2023–2024: Halcones de Xalapa
- 2025: Prishtina
- 2025: Halcones de Xalapa
- 2026–present: Lobos de Puebla

Career highlights
- 2× All-Bundesliga First Team (2019, 2020); All-VTB United League Second Team (2016); Czech National Cup winner (2014); Austrian Bundesliga All-Star (2009–2010); All-Kazakh League First Team (2015); Kazakh League champion (2015)

Rašid Mahalbašić (born 7 November 1990) is a Slovenian-born Austrian professional basketball player for the Lobos de Puebla of the Liga Nacional de Baloncesto Profesional (LNBP). Standing at 2.11 m (6 ft 11 in), he can play at power forward and center positions.

== Professional career ==
Mahalbašić played with Kelag Wörthersee Piraten of the Austrian Bundesliga. In February 2010, he was on try-out at Montepaschi Siena from Italian Serie A.

In September 2010, Mahalbašić signed a six-year deal with Fenerbahçe Ülker of the Turkish Basketball League.

Mahalbašić was loaned to Tofaş S.K. between December 2010 to February 2011 where he played 10 games. He played with 14 points, 2 rebounds, 1 assist and 1 blok performance against Fenerbahçe Ülker.

He came back to Fenerbahçe Ülker after Mirsad Türkcan's shock injury, then he was loaned again, to KK Split of Croatia for the rest of the 2010–11 season.

In January 2012, Mahalbašić parted ways with Fenerbahçe, and signed with Slovenia's Zlatorog Laško for the rest of the 2011–12 season.

On September 21, 2012, he signed with Asseco Prokom Gdynia of the Polish Basketball League for the 2012–13 season.

On July 20, 2013, Mahalbašić signed a two-year deal with ČEZ Basketball Nymburk of the Czech Republic National Basketball League.

For the 2014–15 season he signed with Astana, a team from the VTB United League and Kazakh League.

On June 1, 2015, Mahalbašić signed a two-year contract with the Russian team Nizhny Novgorod. After one season he left Nizhny and on September 26, 2016, signed with Turkish club Yeşilgiresun Belediye. On December 5, 2016, he left Yeşilgiresun and signed with Spanish club Real Betis Energía Plus for the rest of the season.

On July 3, 2017, Mahalbašić signed with German club EWE Baskets Oldenburg.

On June 10, 2021, he signed with AS Monaco of the French LNB Pro A and the EuroLeague.

On August 3, 2022, he has signed with San Pablo Burgos of the LEB Oro.

On November 28, 2023, he has signed with Cedevita Olimpija of the Adriatic League and the Premier A Slovenian Basketball League.

In January 2025, he signed with Sigal Prishtina of the Liga Unike and the Kosovo Basketball Superleague.

== Austria national team ==
Mahalbašić averaged 15.3 points, 9.7 rebounds and 1.0 assist per game, shooting 76% from the field goal and 53.3% on free throws, in 3 games with the Austrian national team in the qualifications for the Eurobasket 2009 Division B. when he won the tournament MVP.

== Career statistics ==
Legend
GP	Games played	GS	Games started	MPG	Minutes per game
FG%	Field-goal percentage	3P%	3-point field-goal percentage	FT%	Free-throw percentage
RPG	Rebounds per game	APG	Assists per game	SPG	Steals per game
BPG	Blocks per game	PPG	Points per game	PIR	Performance index rating
**Bold**	Career high

=== Euroleague ===
Year	Team	GP	GS	MPG	FG%	3P%	FT%	RPG	APG	SPG	BPG	PPG	PIR
2012–13	Asseco Prokom	10	4	21.5	.582	.000	.591	6.8	1.3	.5	.4	9.1	11.1
Career		10	4	21.5	.582	.000	.591	6.8	1.3	.5	.4	9.1	11.1
