= Kaloyan Ivanov =

Bulgarian basketball player

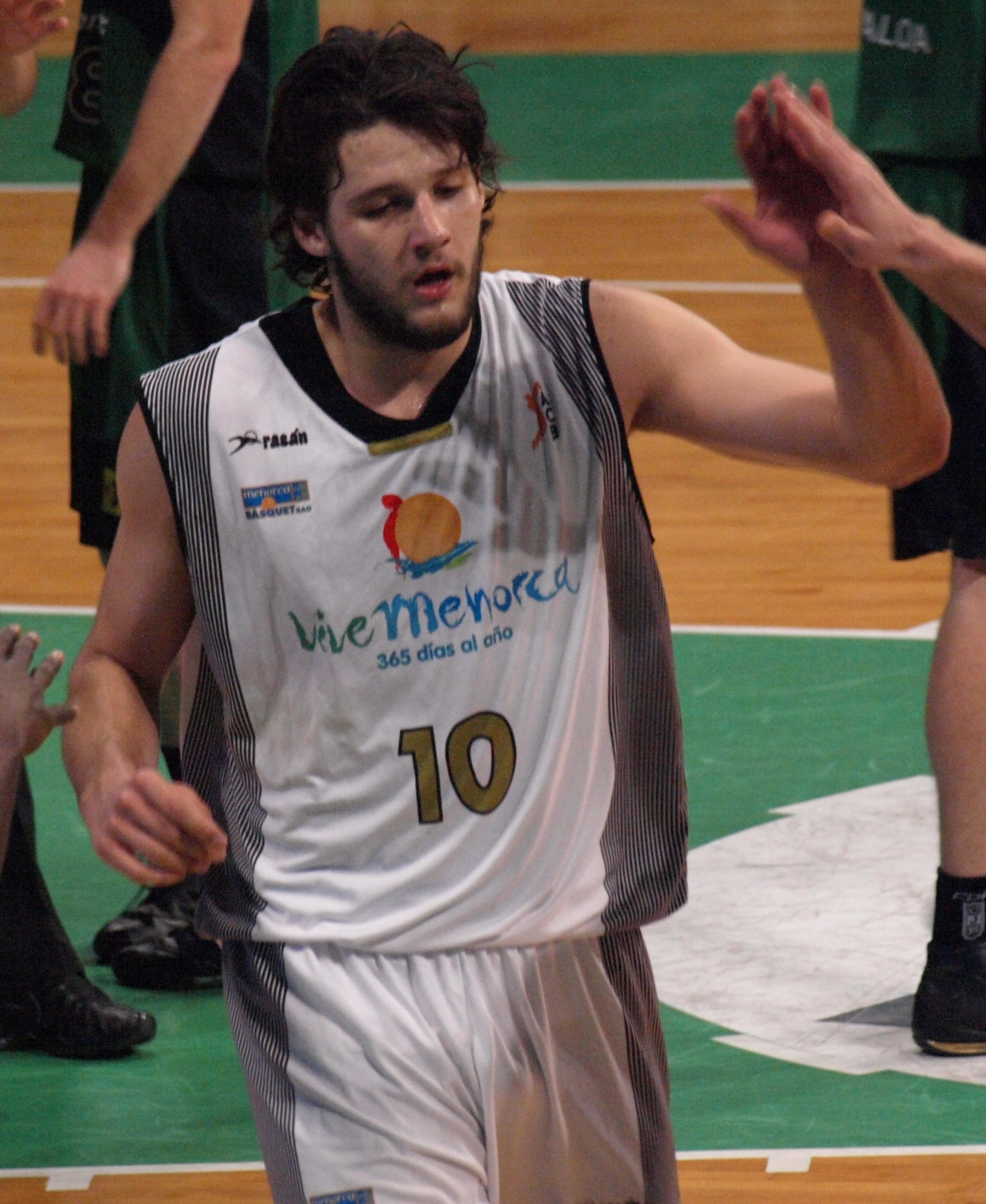
- Ivanov with ViveMenorca in 2009

Personal information
- Born: 18 March 1986 (age 40) Varna, Bulgaria
- Listed height: 6 ft 9 in (2.06 m)
- Listed weight: 220 lb (100 kg)

Career information
- NBA draft: 2008: undrafted
- Playing career: 2002–2019
- Position: Power forward

Career history
- 2002–2003: Cherno More Varna
- 2003–2004: Levski Sofia
- 2004–2005: Avtodor Saratov
- 2005–2006: Cherno More Varna
- 2006–2009: ViveMenorca
- 2009–2010: Bàsquet Manresa
- 2010–2011: Cajasol Sevilla
- 2011–2012: Lucentum Alicante
- 2012: Donetsk
- 2012–2014: Sidigas Avellino
- 2014–2015: Andorra
- 2015: Trabzonspor
- 2015–2017: Tofaş
- 2017–2018: Socar Petkim
- 2018–2019: Levski Sofia

Kaloyan Toshkov Ivanov (born 18 March 1986) is a Bulgarian former professional basketball player for Levski Sofia of the NBL. Standing at 2.06 m (6 ft 9 in), he plays at the power forward position.

== Professional career ==
From 2006 to 2009, Ivanov played with ViveMenorca. On 4 August 2009, he signed a one-year deal with Bàsquet Manresa.

On 20 July 2010 he signed a two-year deal with Spanish club Cajasol Sevilla. On 25 May 2011, he opted out of contract with Sevilla. On 13 August 2011 he signed a two-year contract with Lucentum Alicante. After one season he left Alicante, and signed with Ukrainian club Donetsk. On 20 December 2012, he left Donetsk and signed with Italian club Sidigas Avellino for the rest of the season. On 7 August 2013, he re-signed with Avellino for one more season.

On 8 September 2014, he signed with Andorra of the Liga ACB. On 26 January 2015, he left Andorra and signed with Trabzonspor of the Turkish Basketball League. On 1 July 2015, he left Trabzonspor and signed a two-year deal with Tofaş. On 17 August 2017, he signed with Socar Petkim of the Turkish Basketball First League.

He is Dejan Ivanov's twin brother.

== Honors ==
Junior National Team honors

- European under 20 Champion - 2005 (Bulgaria)
