= Thomas Brugis =

English surgeon

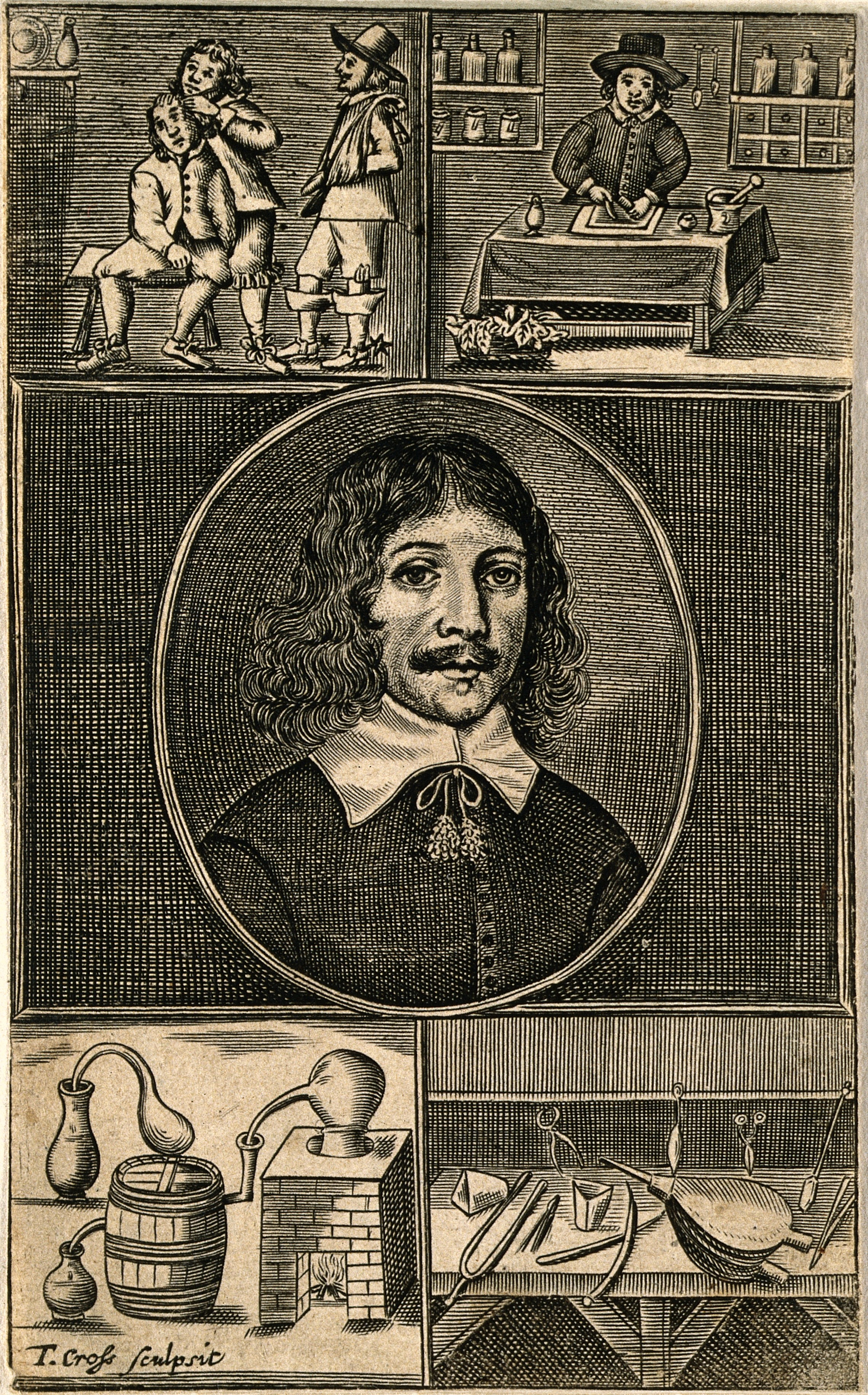
- Occupation: Surgeon

Thomas Brugis (fl. 1640?) was an English surgeon.

== Biography ==
Brugis was born probably between 1610 and 1620, since he practised for seven years as a surgeon during the civil wars. He does not record upon which side he served. He obtained the degree of doctor of physic, though from what university does not appear, and settled at Rickmansworth, Hertfordshire, where he describes himself as curing "(by God's help) all sorts of agues in young and old, and all manner of old sores that are curable by art".

Brugis wrote The Marrow of Physicke, London, 1640, 4to; and Vade Mecum, or a Companion for a Chirurgion, of which the first edition appeared, London, 1651, 12mo, and the seventh 1689, in the same size. The popularity of this little book shows that it must have been useful, but there is nothing original in this or in the earlier work. Perhaps the only notable thing in the Vade Mecum is a small contribution to forensic medicine, in the shape of rules for the reports which a surgeon might have to make before a coroner's inquest. Even this is partly taken from Ambroise Paré; but we know of nothing like it in any earlier English book.
