= Thomas Lærke =

Danish basketball player (born 1991)

No. 10 – Telekom Baskets Bonn II
- Position: Guard

Personal information
- Born: 4 April 1991 (age 35) Copenhagen, Denmark
- Listed height: 6 ft 5 in (1.96 m)

Career information
- High school: Gainesville (Gainesville, Florida)
- NBA draft: 2013: undrafted
- Playing career: 2010–present

Career history
- 2010–2011: Peñas Huesca
- 2011: Pas Piélagos
- 2011–2012: Pla de Na Tesa
- 2012: Araberri
- 2012–2013: Pla de Na Tesa
- 2013–2017: Bakken Bears
- 2017: Nokia
- 2017–2022: Bakken Bears
- 2022: VfL Kirchheim Knights
- 2022–2023: Esgueira Basket
- 2023: CB Morón
- 2023–present: Telekom Baskets Bonn II

Career highlights
- 7× Danish League champion (2014, 2017–2022); 4× Danish Cup winner (2014, 2016, 2018, 2020, 2021)

Thomas Lærke (born 4 April 1991) is a Danish professional basketball player. He is currently playing for the Telekom Baskets Bonn II in the German Regionalliga West.

He was a member of the Danish national basketball team and participated at the 2015 EuroBasket qualification.

== Professional career ==
Lærke started his professional career in 2011 in Spain with Huesca of the LEB Oro.

In 2013, Lærke returned to Denmark by signing with Bakken Bears. With the Bears, he won two national championships and two national cups over a four-year span.

On 7 July 2017, he signed with BC Nokia of the Finnish Korisliiga. In December 2017, Lærke returned to Bakken Bears. He parted company with the Bears at the conclusion of the 2021–22 season after winning a total of seven national championships with the team. In 2018, 2020 and 2022, he reached the semifinal of the FIBA Europe Cup with the Bakken side.

Lærke continued his career abroad, signing with the VfL Kirchheim Knights of the German second-tier league ProA in late September 2022. He saw action in three ProA contests, averaging 7.7 points a game. His short-term-contract was not renewed in October 2022. Subsequently, Lærke moved to Esgueira Basket of Portugal's first-tier league. On 1 March 2023 he was signed by CB Morón of Spain's LEB Plata.

He signed with Telekom Baskets Bonn's second men's team in November 2023 to play in the German Regionalliga West.
