= EuroBasket 2017 qualification squads =

This article displays the squads of the teams that competed in EuroBasket 2017 qualification. Each team consists of 12 players.

Age and club as of the start of the tournament, 31 August 2016.

== Group A ==
=== Belgium ===
Belgium men's national basketball team roster
Players
Coaches

| Pos. | No. | Name | Age – Date of birth | Height | Club | Ctr. |
|---|---|---|---|---|---|---|
| G | 4 | Lionel Bosco | 34 – 18 September 1981 | 1.75 m (5 ft 9 in) | Belfius Mons-Hainaut | (Belgium) |
| G | 5 | Retin Obasohan | 23 – 6 July 1993 | 1.83 m (6 ft 0 in) | Sidigas Avellino | (Italy) |
| PF | 8 | Jean-Marc Mwema | 26 – 5 December 1989 | 1.95 m (6 ft 5 in) | Antwerp Giants | (Belgium) |
| SG | 9 | Jonathan Tabu | 30 – 7 October 1985 | 1.84 m (6 ft 0 in) | Bilbao Basket | (Spain) |
| G | 11 | Loic Schwartz | 23 – 4 December 1992 | 1.95 m (6 ft 5 in) | Spirou Charleroi | (Belgium) |
| F | 12 | Jean Salumu | 26 – 26 July 1990 | 1.93 m (6 ft 4 in) | Oostende | (Belgium) |
| PF | 14 | Maxime de Zeeuw | 29 – 26 April 1987 | 2.04 m (6 ft 8 in) | Oldenburg | (Germany) |
| C | 15 | Khalid Boukichou | 23 – 17 September 1992 | 2.06 m (6 ft 9 in) | Oostende | (Belgium) |
| C | 16 | Kevin Tumba | 25 – 23 February 1991 | 2.06 m (6 ft 9 in) | Spirou Charleroi | (Belgium) |
| F | 17 | Hans Vanwijn | 21 – 15 February 1995 | 2.05 m (6 ft 9 in) | Limburg United | (Belgium) |
| C | 19 | Ioann Iarochevitch | 27 – 31 May 1989 | 2.06 m (6 ft 9 in) | Liège Basket | (Belgium) |
| F | 21 | Vincent Kesteloot | 21 – 23 March 1995 | 2.02 m (6 ft 8 in) | Oostende | (Belgium) |

Head coach

- (Belgium) Eddy Casteels

Assistant coach(es)

- (Belgium) Thierry Declercq

Legend

- Club – describes last
  club before the tournament
- Age – describes age
  on 5 September 2016

=== Cyprus ===
Cyprus men's national basketball team roster
Players
Coaches

| Pos. | No. | Name | Age – Date of birth | Height | Club |
|---|---|---|---|---|---|---|
| PF | 1 | Christos Loizides | 25 – 26 May 1991 | 2.06 m (6 ft 9 in) | ETHA Engomis | (Cyprus) |
| C | 3 | Anthony King | 31 – 22 January 1985 | 2.06 m (6 ft 9 in) | Gaziantep | (Turkey) |
| PG | 5 | Simon Michail | 24 – 19 June 1992 | 1.84 m (6 ft 0 in) | Keravnos B.C. | (Cyprus) |
| G/F | 6 | Andreas Pilavas | 32 – 1 September 1983 | 1.92 m (6 ft 4 in) | ETHA Engomis | (Cyprus) |
| F/C | 7 | Panagiotis Trisokkas | 36 – 29 August 1980 | 2.06 m (6 ft 9 in) | AEK Larnaca B.C. | (Cyprus) |
| G/F | 8 | Gabriel Kilaras | 26 – 9 January 1990 | 1.94 m (6 ft 4 in) | APOEL B.C. | (Cyprus) |
| SG | 9 | Andreas Sizopoulos | 33 – 30 July 1983 | 1.93 m (6 ft 4 in) | AEK Larnaca B.C. | (Cyprus) |
| PG | 11 | Aristides Koronides | 34 – 20 April 1982 | 1.88 m (6 ft 2 in) | APOEL B.C. | (Cyprus) |
| SG | 12 | Grigoris Pantouris | 34 – 22 July 1982 | 1.90 m (6 ft 3 in) | APOEL B.C. | (Cyprus) |
| PF | 15 | George Theocharides | 31 – 4 June 1985 | 2.02 m (6 ft 8 in) | Keravnos B.C. | (Cyprus) |
| C | 22 | Christodoulos Kaskiris | 36 – 22 December 1979 | 2.08 m (6 ft 10 in) | APOEL B.C. | (Cyprus) |
| G | 27 | Christopher Razis | 27 – 7 July 1989 | 1.94 m (6 ft 4 in) | Rethymno Cretan | (Greece) |
| G | 44 | Iakovos Panteli | 30 – 3 October 1985 | 1.89 m (6 ft 2 in) | AEK Larnaca B.C. | (Cyprus) |
| SF | 99 | Nikolaos Stylianou | 27 – 9 November 1988 | 1.98 m (6 ft 6 in) | Keravnos B.C. | (Cyprus) |

Head coach

- (Greece) Panayiotis Yiannaras

Assistant coach(es)

- (Cyprus) Nikolas Papadopoulos
- (Greece) Nicos Lambrias

Legend

- Club – describes last
  club before the tournament
- Age – describes age
  on 26 August 2016

=== Iceland ===
Iceland men's basketball national team roster
Players
Coaches

| Pos. | No. | Name | Age – Date of birth | Height | Club | Ctr. |
|---|---|---|---|---|---|---|
| SF | 4 | Axel Kárason | 33 – 11 February 1983 | 1.92 m (6 ft 4 in) | Svendborg Rabbits | (Denmark) |
| PF | 6 | Kristofer Acox | 22 – 13 October 1993 | 1.98 m (6 ft 6 in) | Furman | (United States) |
| C | 7 | Sigurður Þorsteinsson | 28 – 8 July 1988 | 2.04 m (6 ft 8 in) | A.E.L. 1964 | (Iceland) |
| C | 8 | Hlynur Bæringsson | 34 – 6 July 1982 | 2.00 m (6 ft 7 in) | Stjarnan | (Iceland) |
| SG | 9 | Jón Arnór Stefánsson | 33 – 21 September 1982 | 1.96 m (6 ft 5 in) | KR Reykjavík | (Iceland) |
| PG | 10 | Aegir Steinarsson | 25 – 10 May 1991 | 1.82 m (6 ft 0 in) | CB Miraflores | (Spain) |
| PG | 12 | Elvar Már Friðriksson | 21 – 11 November 1994 | 1.82 m (6 ft 0 in) | Barry Buccaneers | (United States) |
| PG | 13 | Hörður Vilhjálmsson | 27 – 18 December 1988 | 1.90 m (6 ft 3 in) | Rethymno Cretan | (Greece) |
| SG | 14 | Logi Gunnarsson | 34 – 5 September 1981 | 1.92 m (6 ft 4 in) | Njarðvíkur | (Iceland) |
| SG | 15 | Martin Hermannsson | 21 – 16 September 1994 | 1.90 m (6 ft 3 in) | Étoile | (France) |
| SG | 21 | Ólafur Ólafsson | 25 – 28 November 1990 | 1.94 m (6 ft 4 in) | Grindavíkur | (Iceland) |
| SF | 24 | Haukur Helgi Pálsson | 24 – 18 May 1992 | 1.98 m (6 ft 6 in) | Rouen Métropole | (France) |
| C | 34 | Tryggvi Hlinason | 18 – 28 October 1997 | 2.15 m (7 ft 1 in) | Þór Akureyri | (Iceland) |
| PG | 88 | Brynjar Bjornsson | 28 – 11 July 1988 | 1.88 m (6 ft 2 in) | KR Reykjavík | (Iceland) |

Head coach

- (Canada) Craig Pedersen

Assistant coach(es)

- (Iceland) Finnur Freyr Stefánsson
- (Iceland) Arnar Guðjónsson

Legend

- Club – describes last
  club before the tournament
- Age – describes age
  on 26 August 2016

=== Switzerland ===
Switzerland men's national basketball team roster
Players
Coaches

| Pos. | No. | Name | Age – Date of birth | Height | Club | Ctr. |
|---|---|---|---|---|---|---|
| G | 4 | Steeve Louissaint | 28 – 11 November 1987 | 1.90 m (6 ft 3 in) | Lions de Genève | (Switzerland) |
| PG | 5 | Brian Savoy | 24 – 13 January 1992 | 1.88 m (6 ft 2 in) | Union Neuchâtel | (Switzerland) |
| PG | 6 | Jonathan Kazadi | 25 – 9 June 1991 | 1.88 m (6 ft 2 in) | Entente Orléanaise | (France) |
| SF | 7 | Marko Mlađan | 23 – 26 March 1993 | 2.07 m (6 ft 9 in) | BBC Monthey | (Switzerland) |
| SF | 8 | Juraj Kozić | 21 – 24 May 1995 | 1.88 m (6 ft 2 in) | Lions de Genève | (Switzerland) |
| PF | 9 | Natan Jurkovitz | 21 – 4 April 1995 | 1.88 m (6 ft 2 in) | Fribourg Olympic | (Switzerland) |
| SF | 11 | Dušan Mlađan | 29 – 16 November 1986 | 1.98 m (6 ft 6 in) | Lions de Genève | (Switzerland) |
| SG | 14 | Roberto Kovac | 25 – 2 September 1990 | 1.87 m (6 ft 2 in) | Lions de Genève | (Switzerland) |
| PF | 15 | Arnaud Cotture | 21 – 9 August 1995 | 1.88 m (6 ft 2 in) | Fribourg Olympic | (Switzerland) |
| SF | 25 | Eric Fongue | 25 – 25 February 1991 | 1.88 m (6 ft 2 in) | Fribourg Olympic | (Switzerland) |
| PF | 47 | David Ramseier | 28 – 1 November 1987 | 2.03 m (6 ft 8 in) | Lions de Genève | (Switzerland) |
| C | 77 | Nicolas Dos Santos | 29 – 10 April 1987 | 2.01 m (6 ft 7 in) | Benfica | (Portugal) |

Head coach

- (Bosnia and Herzegovina) Petar Aleksić

Assistant coach(es)

- (Serbia) Dušan Gvozdić

Legend

- Club – describes last
  club before the tournament
- Age – describes age
  on 31 August 2016

== Group B ==
=== Austria ===
Austria men's national basketball team roster
Players
Coaches

| Pos. | No. | Name | Age – Date of birth | Height | Club | Ctr. |
|---|---|---|---|---|---|---|
| PG | 5 | Thomas Schreiner | 29 – 3 February 1987 | 1.95 m (6 ft 5 in) | Andorra | (Andorra) |
| PF | 7 | Davor Lamesic | 32 – 24 October 1983 | 2.07 m (6 ft 9 in) | Wels | (Austria) |
| SF | 8 | Enis Murati | 23 – 5 August 1993 | 1.94 m (6 ft 4 in) | Swans Gmunden | (Austria) |
| F | 12 | Joe Shaw | 29 – 11 June 1987 | 2.00 m (6 ft 7 in) | Kapfenberg Bulls | (Austria) |
| C | 14 | Jozo Radoš | 25 – 2 January 1991 | 2.07 m (6 ft 9 in) | Klosterneuburg Dukes | (Austria) |
| SF | 20 | Romed Vieider | 22 – 26 October 1993 | 1.96 m (6 ft 5 in) | Klosterneuburg Dukes | (Austria) |
| PF | 21 | Florian Trmal | 27 – 29 August 1989 | 1.98 m (6 ft 6 in) | Traiskirchen Lions | (Austria) |
| C | 24 | Rašid Mahalbašić | 25 – 7 November 1990 | 2.08 m (6 ft 10 in) | Nizhny Novgorod | (Russia) |
| PG | 34 | Moritz Lanegger | 26 – 29 March 1990 | 1.90 m (6 ft 3 in) | Güssing Knights | (Austria) |
| PF | 35 | Sebastian Koch | 28 – 22 January 1988 | 2.02 m (6 ft 8 in) | Güssing Knights | (Austria) |
| PF | 41 | Maximilian Hopfgartner | 23 – 20 November 1992 | 2.06 m (6 ft 9 in) | Planasa Navarra | (Spain) |
| SG | 43 | Anton Maresch | 25 – 8 August 1991 | 1.92 m (6 ft 4 in) | Burgos | (Spain) |
| PF | 44 | Filip Kramer | 24 – 8 June 1992 | 2.02 m (6 ft 8 in) | Kapfenberg Bulls | (Austria) |

Head coach

- (Lithuania) Kęstutis Kemzūra

Assistant coach(es)

- (Lithuania) Robertas Kuncaitis

Legend

- Club – describes last
  club before the tournament
- Age – describes age
  on 31 August 2016

=== Denmark ===
Denmark men's national basketball team roster
Players
Coaches

| Pos. | No. | Name | Age – Date of birth | Height | Club |
|---|---|---|---|---|---|---|
| F | 3 | Alexander Bak | 25 – 16 January 1991 | 1.93 m (6 ft 4 in) | Team FOG Næstved | (Denmark) |
| G | 4 | Adama Darboe | 30 – 26 April 1986 | 1.90 m (6 ft 3 in) | Bakken Bears | (Denmark) |
| G | 9 | Darko Jukić | 26 – 23 August 1990 | 1.99 m (6 ft 6 in) | KK Krka | (Slovenia) |
| F | 11 | Nicolai Andersen | 26 – 14 March 1990 | 2.01 m (6 ft 7 in) | Kouvot | (Finland) |
| F | 15 | Žarko Jukić | 22 – 28 October 1993 | 2.01 m (6 ft 7 in) | Norrköping Dolphins | (Sweden) |
| C | 18 | Lasse Elbaek | 22 – 28 February 1994 | 2.08 m (6 ft 10 in) | Malbas | (Sweden) |
| G | 20 | Alan Voskuil | 29 – 10 September 1986 | 1.91 m (6 ft 3 in) | Pallacanestro Virtus Roma | (Italy) |
| G | 23 | Gabriel Lundberg | 21 – 4 December 1994 | 1.93 m (6 ft 4 in) | Horsens IC | (Denmark) |
| F | 25 | Jonas Bergstedt | 25 – 6 July 1991 | 2.10 m (6 ft 11 in) | Aalstar | (Belgium) |
| F | 33 | Jonathan Gilling | 25 – 29 June 1991 | 2.03 m (6 ft 8 in) | Hørsholm 79ers | (Denmark) |
| F | 42 | Mathias Seilund | 26 – 25 January 1990 | 2.01 m (6 ft 7 in) | Bristol Flyers | (United Kingdom) |
| G | 45 | Esben Reinholt | 23 – 13 April 1993 | 1.95 m (6 ft 5 in) | Södertälje Kings | (Sweden) |
| F | 46 | Frederik Rungby | 23 – 7 June 1993 | 2.00 m (6 ft 7 in) | Horsens IC | (Denmark) |

Head coach

- (Finland) Pieti Poikola

Assistant coach(es)

- (Spain) Israel Martin

Legend

- Club – describes last
  club before the tournament
- Age – describes age
  on 26 August 2016

=== Germany ===
Germany men's national basketball team roster
Players
Coaches

| Pos. | No. | Name | Age – Date of birth | Height | Club | Ctr. |
|---|---|---|---|---|---|---|
| SG | 1 | Makai Mason | 21 – 4 May 1995 | 1.86 m (6 ft 1 in) | Yale Bulldogs | (United States) |
| SG | 3 | Akeem Vargas | 26 – 29 April 1990 | 1.92 m (6 ft 4 in) | Alba Berlin | (Germany) |
| G | 4 | Maodo Lô | 24 – 12 March 1992 | 1.96 m (6 ft 5 in) | Brose Bamberg | (Germany) |
| SF | 5 | Niels Giffey | 25 – 8 June 1991 | 2.06 m (6 ft 9 in) | ALBA Berlin | (Germany) |
| PF | 10 | Daniel Theis | 24 – 4 April 1992 | 2.03 m (6 ft 8 in) | Brose Bamberg | (Germany) |
| C | 11 | Tibor Pleiß | 26 – 2 November 1989 | 2.26 m (7 ft 5 in) | Utah Jazz | (United States) |
| SF | 12 | Robin Benzing | 27 – 25 January 1989 | 2.08 m (6 ft 10 in) | CAI Zaragoza | (Spain) |
| PG | 13 | Bastian Doreth | 27 – 8 June 1989 | 1.82 m (6 ft 0 in) | Medi Bayreuth | (Germany) |
| SF | 21 | Paul Zipser | 22 – 18 February 1994 | 2.09 m (6 ft 10 in) | Chicago Bulls | (United States) |
| PF | 22 | Danilo Barthel | 24 – 24 October 1991 | 2.07 m (6 ft 9 in) | Bayern Munich | (Germany) |
| C | 32 | Johannes Thiemann | 22 – 9 February 1994 | 2.04 m (6 ft 8 in) | Ludwigsburg | (Germany) |
| SF | 33 | Patrick Heckmann | 24 – 27 February 1992 | 1.98 m (6 ft 6 in) | Brose Bamberg | (Germany) |
| C | 77 | Johannes Voigtmann | 22 – 30 September 1992 | 2.20 m (7 ft 3 in) | Laboral Kutxa | (Spain) |

Head coach

- (United States) Chris Fleming

Assistant coach(es)

- (Germany) David Bliss
- (Germany) Henrik Rödl
- Club – describes last
  club before the tournament
- Age – describes age
  on 5 September 2016

=== Netherlands ===
Netherlands men's national basketball team roster
Players
Coaches

| Pos. | No. | Name | Age – Date of birth | Height | Club |
|---|---|---|---|---|---|---|
| SG | 0 | Yannick Franke | 20 – 21 May 1996 | 1.90 m (6 ft 3 in) | Bisons Loimaa | (Finland) |
| SG | 5 | Dimeo van der Horst | 25 – 23 June 1991 | 1.95 m (6 ft 5 in) | Apollo Amsterdam | (Netherlands) |
| SG | 6 | Worthy de Jong | 28 – 14 March 1988 | 1.94 m (6 ft 4 in) | Boulogne-sur-Mer | (France) |
| PG | 7 | Charlon Kloof | 26 – 20 March 1990 | 1.90 m (6 ft 3 in) | MZT Skopje | (North Macedonia) |
| PG | 8 | Stefan Mladenović | 26 – 28 June 1990 | 1.91 m (6 ft 3 in) | Rotterdam | (Netherlands) |
| SF | 9 | Mohamed Kherrazi | 26 – 29 June 1990 | 2.00 m (6 ft 7 in) | ZZ Leiden | (Netherlands) |
| C | 11 | Thomas Koenis | 26 – 12 December 1989 | 2.10 m (6 ft 11 in) | ZZ Leiden | (Netherlands) |
| PF | 12 | Thomas van der Mars | 25 – 15 November 1990 | 2.08 m (6 ft 10 in) | Rapla KK | (Estonia) |
| F/C | 13 | Roeland Schaftenaar | 28 – 29 July 1988 | 2.11 m (6 ft 11 in) | Rethymno Cretan Kings | (Greece) |
| C | 18 | Nicolas de Jong | 28 – 15 May 1988 | 2.10 m (6 ft 11 in) | Champagne Châlons-Reims | (France) |
| SG | 24 | Jessey Voorn | 26 – 17 March 1990 | 1.93 m (6 ft 4 in) | ZZ Leiden | (Netherlands) |
| G | 44 | Arvin Slagter | 30 – 19 October 1985 | 1.92 m (6 ft 4 in) | Donar | (Netherlands) |

Head coach

- (Netherlands) Toon van Helfteren

Assistant coach(es)

- (Netherlands) Sam Jones

Legend

- (C) Team captain
- Club – describes last
  club before the tournament
- Age – describes age
  on 5 September 2016

== Group C ==
=== Bosnia and Herzegovina ===
Bosnia and Herzegovina men's national basketball team roster
Players
Coaches

| Pos. | No. | Name | Age – Date of birth | Height | Club | Ctr. |
|---|---|---|---|---|---|---|
| C | 0 | Jusuf Nurkić | 22 – 23 August 1994 | 2.13 m (7 ft 0 in) | Denver Nuggets | (United States) |
| PG | 4 | Adi Zahiragić | 21 – 24 February 1995 | 1.87 m (6 ft 2 in) | Spars Sarajevo | (Bosnia and Herzegovina) |
| SF | 5 | Nedim Buza | 21 – 10 May 1995 | 2.02 m (6 ft 8 in) | Telenet Oostende | (Belgium) |
| SF | 7 | Adin Vrabac | 22 – 27 January 1994 | 2.05 m (6 ft 9 in) | Partizan NIS Belgrade | (Serbia) |
| SF | 8 | Milan Milošević | 30 – 26 October 1985 | 2.02 m (6 ft 8 in) | AEK | (Greece) |
| SG | 9 | Amar Gegić | 18 – 14 February 1998 | 1.98 m (6 ft 6 in) | Spars Sarajevo | (Bosnia and Herzegovina) |
| PG | 10 | Nemanja Gordić | 27 – 25 September 1988 | 1.94 m (6 ft 4 in) | Budućnost VOLI | (Montenegro) |
| C | 11 | Elmedin Kikanović | 27 – 2 September 1988 | 2.11 m (6 ft 11 in) | Alba Berlin | (Germany) |
| PF | 12 | Mirza Teletović | 30 – 17 September 1985 | 2.06 m (6 ft 9 in) | Milwaukee Bucks | (United States) |
| SF | 13 | Džanan Musa | 17 – 8 May 1999 | 2.05 m (6 ft 9 in) | Cedevita | (Croatia) |
| PF | 22 | Emir Sulejmanović | 21 – 13 July 1995 | 2.06 m (6 ft 9 in) | Cibona | (Croatia) |
| SG | 25 | Nikola Gajić | 25 – 15 July 1991 | 1.95 m (6 ft 5 in) | Lastovka | (Slovenia) |
| PF | 77 | Miralem Halilović | 25 – 22 July 1991 | 2.05 m (6 ft 9 in) | Šibenik | (Croatia) |

Head coach

- (Bosnia and Herzegovina) Damir Mulaomerović

Assistant coach(es)

- (Bosnia and Herzegovina) Dževad Alihodžić

Legend

- Club – describes last
  club before the tournament
- Age – describes age
  on 31 August 2016

=== Russia ===
Russia men's national basketball team roster
Players
Coaches

| Pos. | No. | Name | Age – Date of birth | Height | Club | Ctr. |
|---|---|---|---|---|---|---|
| SF | 3 | Sergey Karasev | 22 – 26 October 1993 | 2.01 m (6 ft 7 in) | Zenit St Petersburg | (Russia) |
| PG | 4 | Evgeny Baburin | 29 – 7 April 1987 | 1.90 m (6 ft 3 in) | Lokomotiv Kuban | (Russia) |
| PF | 8 | Vladimir Ivlev | 26 – 28 February 1990 | 2.07 m (6 ft 9 in) | Lokomotiv Kuban | (Russia) |
| PG | 10 | Sergei Bykov | 33 – 26 February 1983 | 1.90 m (6 ft 3 in) | Lokomotiv Kuban | (Russia) |
| F | 11 | Semyon Antonov | 26 – 18 July 1989 | 2.02 m (6 ft 8 in) | CSKA Moscow | (Russia) |
| PF | 12 | Andrey Zubkov | 24 – 29 June 1991 | 2.05 m (6 ft 9 in) | Lokomotiv Kuban | (Russia) |
| PG | 13 | Dmitry Khvostov | 26 – 21 August 1989 | 1.90 m (6 ft 3 in) | Lokomotiv Kuban | (Russia) |
| C | 15 | Timofey Mozgov | 29 – 16 July 1986 | 2.16 m (7 ft 1 in) | Los Angeles Lakers | (United States) |
| PG | 18 | Maxim Kolyushkin | 25 – 11 December 1990 | 1.92 m (6 ft 4 in) | Avtodor Saratov | (Russia) |
| PF | 20 | Andrey Vorontsevich | 28 – 17 July 1987 | 2.07 m (6 ft 9 in) | CSKA Moscow | (Russia) |
| SF | 21 | Stanislav Ilnitskiy | 22 – 24 February 1994 | 2.02 m (6 ft 8 in) | Khimki | (Russia) |
| SG | 22 | Dmitry Kulagin | 23 – 1 July 1992 | 1.97 m (6 ft 6 in) | CSKA Moscow | (Russia) |

Head coach

- (Russia) Sergei Bazarevich

Assistant coach(es)

- (Russia) Georgy Artemyev
- (Russia) Andrey Maltsev
- (Russia) Zakhar Pashutin

Legend

- Club – describes last
  club before the tournament
- Age – describes age
  on 20 June 2016

=== Sweden ===
Sweden men's national basketball team roster
Players
Coaches

| Pos. | No. | Name | Age – Date of birth | Height | Club | Ctr. |
|---|---|---|---|---|---|---|
| PG | 4 | Jonathan Person | 23 – 10 February 1993 | 1.90 m (6 ft 3 in) | Uppsala Basket | (Sweden) |
| PG | 5 | Tobias Borg | 22 – 2 November 1993 | 1.84 m (6 ft 0 in) | Bilbao Basket | (Spain) |
| C | 6 | Joakim Kjellbom | 37 – 22 April 1979 | 2.13 m (7 ft 0 in) | Norrköping Dolphins | (Sweden) |
| SG | 7 | Dino Pita | 27 – 20 September 1988 | 1.92 m (6 ft 4 in) | Södertälje Kings | (Sweden) |
| G/F | 8 | Anton Gaddefors | 26 – 4 November 1989 | 2.00 m (6 ft 7 in) | Uppsala Basket | (Sweden) |
| PG | 9 | Thomas Massamba | 31 – 28 March 1985 | 1.85 m (6 ft 1 in) | Sigal Prishtina | (Kosovo) |
| SG | 10 | Martin Pahlmblad | 30 – 9 May 1986 | 1.93 m (6 ft 4 in) | Kymis B.C. | (Greece) |
| SF | 11 | Tom Liden | 29 – 11 July 1987 | 2.03 m (6 ft 8 in) | BC Luleå | (Sweden) |
| PG | 12 | Ludvig Håkanson | 20 – 22 March 1996 | 1.87 m (6 ft 2 in) | Baloncesto Fuenlabrada | (Spain) |
| SF | 13 | Chris Czerapowicz | 24 – 15 September 1991 | 2.01 m (6 ft 7 in) | Miasto Szkła Krosno | (Poland) |
| PF | 14 | Alexander Lindqvist | 25 – 12 February 1991 | 2.05 m (6 ft 9 in) | Spirou Charleroi | (Belgium) |
| PF | 16 | Nicholas Spires | 22 – 25 February 1994 | 2.10 m (6 ft 11 in) | Södertälje Kings | (Sweden) |
| C | 40 | Carl Engstrom | 24 – 26 September 1991 | 2.16 m (7 ft 1 in) | Palencia Baloncesto | (Spain) |

Head coach

- (Bosnia and Herzegovina) Vedran Bosnić

Assistant coach(es)

- (Sweden) Pontus Frevold
- (Sweden) Fredrik Joulamo

Legend

- Club – describes last
  club before the tournament
- Age – describes age
  on 31 August 2016

== Group D ==
=== Belarus ===
Belarus men's national basketball team roster
Players
Coaches

| Pos. | No. | Name | Age – Date of birth | Height | Club |
|---|---|---|---|---|---|---|
| G | 2 | Maalik Wayns | 25 – 2 May 1991 | 1.85 m (6 ft 1 in) | Yenisey Krasnoyarsk | (Russia) |
| F | 5 | Mikita Meshcharakou | 30 – 16 June 1986 | 2.03 m (6 ft 8 in) | Asesoft Ploiești | (Romania) |
| F | 7 | Maksim Salash | 28 – 30 July 1988 | 2.06 m (6 ft 9 in) | Ourense Termal | (Spain) |
| C | 9 | Artsiom Parakhouski | 20 – 6 May 1996 | 2.10 m (6 ft 11 in) | UNICS Kazan | (Russia) |
| G | 10 | Vitali Liutych | 24 – 9 May 1992 | 1.98 m (6 ft 6 in) | Tsmoki-Minsk | (Belarus) |
| F | 12 | Aliaksandr Pustahvar | 31 – 3 April 1985 | 2.01 m (6 ft 7 in) | Falco Szombathely | (Hungary) |
| G | 14 | Aliaksandr Kudrautsau | 36 – 23 May 1980 | 1.90 m (6 ft 3 in) | Tsmoki-Minsk | (Belarus) |
| F | 15 | Aliaksei Trastsinetski | 30 – 2 March 1986 | 2.00 m (6 ft 7 in) | Tsmoki-Minsk | (Belarus) |
| G | 22 | Roman Rubinshteyn | 20 – 22 May 1996 | 1.93 m (6 ft 4 in) | Zlatorog Laško | (Slovenia) |
| G | 23 | Kiryl Sitnik | 26 – 23 October 1989 | 1.88 m (6 ft 2 in) | Grodno-93 | (Belarus) |
| G | 24 | Artsiom Malkou | 28 – 28 June 1988 | 1.85 m (6 ft 1 in) | Grodno-93 | (Belarus) |
| C | 77 | Aliaksandr Semianiuk | 22 – 14 September 1993 | 2.10 m (6 ft 11 in) | Tsmoki-Minsk | (Belarus) |
| F | 88 | Viachaslau Korzh | 29 – 23 September 1986 | 1.93 m (6 ft 4 in) | Grodno-93 | (Belarus) |

Head coach

- (Belarus) Aleksander Krutikov

Assistant coach(es)

- (Belarus) Andrei Krivonos
- (Belarus) Yahor Meshcharakou

Legend

- (C) Team captain
- Club – describes last
  club before the tournament
- Age – describes age
  on 31 August 2016

=== Estonia ===
Estonia men's national basketball team roster
Players
Coaches

| Pos. | No. | Name | Age – Date of birth | Height | Club | Ctr. |
|---|---|---|---|---|---|---|
| SG | 4 | Rain Veideman (C) | 24 – 1 October 1991 | 1.92 m (6 ft 4 in) | Kalev/Cramo | (Estonia) |
| PG | 5 | Rait-Riivo Laane | 23 – 24 May 1993 | 1.79 m (5 ft 10 in) | TTÜ | (Estonia) |
| PG | 7 | Sten Sokk | 27 – 14 February 1989 | 1.84 m (6 ft 0 in) | Kalev/Cramo | (Estonia) |
| SG | 8 | Martin Paasoja | 23 – 4 January 1993 | 1.91 m (6 ft 3 in) | AVIS Rapla | (Estonia) |
| SF | 10 | Erik Keedus | 26 – 27 April 1990 | 1.98 m (6 ft 6 in) | Kalev/Cramo | (Estonia) |
| PF | 15 | Toomas Raadik | 26 – 15 August 1990 | 2.02 m (6 ft 8 in) | TTÜ | (Estonia) |
| PG | 21 | Martin Dorbek | 25 – 21 January 1991 | 1.94 m (6 ft 4 in) | Kalev/Cramo | (Estonia) |
| SF | 22 | Tanel Kurbas | 28 – 8 May 1988 | 1.97 m (6 ft 6 in) | Södertälje Kings | (Sweden) |
| PF | 23 | Indrek Kajupank | 28 – 15 May 1988 | 2.00 m (6 ft 7 in) | AVIS Rapla | (Estonia) |
| C | 24 | Kristjan Kitsing | 25 – 11 December 1990 | 2.05 m (6 ft 9 in) | TTÜ | (Estonia) |
| C | 40 | Rain Raadik | 27 – 17 May 1989 | 2.08 m (6 ft 10 in) | Valga-Valka/Maks & Moorits | (Estonia) |
| PF | 51 | Reinar Hallik | 32 – 5 January 1984 | 2.08 m (6 ft 10 in) | Port of Pärnu | (Estonia) |

Head coach

- (Estonia) Tiit Sokk

Assistant coach(es)

- (Estonia) Alar Varrak
- (Estonia) Rait Käbin
- (Estonia) Joosep Toome

Legend

- (C) Team captain
- Club – describes last
  club before the tournament
- Age – describes age on
  31 August 2016

=== Poland ===
Poland men's national basketball team roster
Players
Coaches

| Pos. | No. | Name | Age – Date of birth | Height | Club | Ctr. |
|---|---|---|---|---|---|---|
| PF | 0 | Olek Czyż | 26 – 3 March 1990 | 2.04 m (6 ft 8 in) | Juvecaserta | (Italy) |
| PF | 1 | Maciej Lampe | 31 – 5 February 1985 | 2.11 m (6 ft 11 in) | Shenzhen Leopards | (China) |
| SG | 6 | A. J. Slaughter | 29 – 3 August 1987 | 1.91 m (6 ft 3 in) | Strasbourg | (France) |
| SG | 8 | Przemysław Zamojski | 29 – 16 December 1986 | 1.93 m (6 ft 4 in) | Zielona Góra | (Poland) |
| SF | 9 | Mateusz Ponitka | 23 – 29 August 1993 | 1.97 m (6 ft 6 in) | Pınar Karşıyaka | (Turkey) |
| PF | 10 | Szymon Szewczyk | 33 – 21 December 1982 | 2.05 m (6 ft 9 in) | Zielona Góra | (Poland) |
| SF | 12 | Adam Waczyński | 26 – 15 October 1989 | 1.98 m (6 ft 6 in) | Unicaja | (Spain) |
| SF | 21 | Tomasz Gielo | 23 – 4 January 1993 | 2.01 m (6 ft 7 in) | Joventut Badalona | (Spain) |
| PF | 24 | Michal Sokolowski | 23 – 11 December 1992 | 2.00 m (6 ft 7 in) | Rosa Radom | (Poland) |
| C | 34 | Adam Hrycaniuk | 32 – 15 March 1984 | 2.06 m (6 ft 9 in) | Zielona Góra | (Poland) |
| PG | 55 | Łukasz Koszarek | 32 – 12 January 1984 | 1.87 m (6 ft 2 in) | Zielona Góra | (Poland) |
| PG | 66 | Robert Skibniewski | 33 – 19 July 1983 | 1.82 m (6 ft 0 in) | Anwil | (Poland) |

Head coach

- (United States) Mike Taylor

Assistant coach(es)

- (Poland) Wojciech Kaminski
- (Poland) Pawel Turkiewicz

Legend

- Club – describes last
  club before the tournament
- Age – describes age
  on 5 September 2016

=== Portugal ===
Portugal men's national basketball team roster
Players
Coaches

| Pos. | No. | Name | Age – Date of birth | Height | Club |
|---|---|---|---|---|---|---|
| SG | 4 | José Vilhena | 27 – 16 April 1989 | 1.96 m (6 ft 5 in) | FC Porto | (Portugal) |
| SF | 5 | Joao Soares | 26 – 27 March 1990 | 2.02 m (6 ft 8 in) | Benfica | (Portugal) |
| PG | 8 | Mário Gil Fernandes | 34 – 25 April 1982 | 1.75 m (5 ft 9 in) | Benfica | (Portugal) |
| PG | 9 | Nuno Oliveira | 27 – 20 August 1989 | 1.88 m (6 ft 2 in) | Benfica | (Portugal) |
| SF | 10 | Fábio Lima | 28 – 18 August 1988 | 1.98 m (6 ft 6 in) | CAB Madeira | (Portugal) |
| PF | 11 | Miguel Queiroz | 25 – 4 July 1991 | 2.04 m (6 ft 8 in) | FC Porto | (Portugal) |
| PF | 12 | Joao Guerreiro | 25 – 10 October 1990 | 2.06 m (6 ft 9 in) | Vitória S.C. | (Portugal) |
| SG | 13 | Joao Balseiro | 29 – 14 March 1987 | 1.94 m (6 ft 4 in) | Vitória S.C. | (Portugal) |
| PG | 14 | Pedro Pinto | 28 – 5 March 1988 | 1.87 m (6 ft 2 in) | Vitória S.C. | (Portugal) |
| PF | 15 | João Gomes | 31 – 15 February 1985 | 2.02 m (6 ft 8 in) | Aquila Basket Trento | (Italy) |
| PG | 17 | Tomás Barroso | 25 – 2 November 1990 | 1.83 m (6 ft 0 in) | Benfica | (Portugal) |
| C | 20 | Pedro Belo | 24 – 6 February 1992 | 2.14 m (7 ft 0 in) | Lusitânia | (Portugal) |
| C | 21 | Cláudio Fonseca | 27 – 22 January 1989 | 2.08 m (6 ft 10 in) | Palma Air Europa | (Spain) |

Head coach

- (Portugal) Mario Leonel Palma

Assistant coach(es)

- (Bulgaria) Ivan Kostourkov
- (Portugal) Carlos Seixas

Legend

- Club – describes last
  club before the tournament
- Age – describes age
  on 5 September 2016

== Group E ==
=== Bulgaria ===
Bulgaria men's national basketball team roster
Players
Coaches

| Pos. | No. | Name | Age – Date of birth | Height | Club |
|---|---|---|---|---|---|---|
| PG | 0 | Dee Bost | 26 – 12 November 1989 | 1.88 m (6 ft 2 in) | Monaco | (Monaco) |
| G | 1 | Stanimir Marinov | 24 – 7 September 1991 | 1.93 m (6 ft 4 in) | Sigal Prishtina | (Kosovo) |
| PG | 6 | Evgeni Hadjirusev | 20 – 11 December 1995 | 1.93 m (6 ft 4 in) | BC Levski Sofia | (Bulgaria) |
| SG | 8 | Chavdar Kostov | 28 – 18 April 1988 | 1.96 m (6 ft 5 in) | Union Kavala B.C. | (Greece) |
| G/F | 10 | Pavlin Ivanov | 23 – 28 March 1993 | 1.95 m (6 ft 5 in) | Lukoil Academic | (Bulgaria) |
| SG | 11 | Ivan LIlov | 28 – 6 August 1988 | 1.96 m (6 ft 5 in) | Benacquista Latina | (Italy) |
| F | 12 | Aleks Simeonov | 23 – 28 March 1993 | 2.00 m (6 ft 7 in) | BC Levski Sofia | (Bulgaria) |
| PG | 13 | Asen Velikov | 30 – 11 January 1986 | 1.87 m (6 ft 2 in) | Lukoil Academic | (Bulgaria) |
| C | 15 | Stanislav Vaklinov | 27 – 7 June 1989 | 2.07 m (6 ft 9 in) | Balkan Botevgrad | (Bulgaria) |
| F | 16 | Aleksandar Georgiev | 26 – 20 January 1990 | 2.03 m (6 ft 8 in) | SOMB Boulogne-sur-Mer | (France) |
| C | 17 | Velislav Galabov | 22 – 1 June 1994 | 2.07 m (6 ft 9 in) | Spartak Pleven | (Bulgaria) |
| SF | 27 | Nikolay Stoyanov | 22 – 10 March 1994 | 1.95 m (6 ft 5 in) | Rilski Sportist | (Bulgaria) |
| SF | 32 | Hristo Zahariev | 25 – 27 October 1990 | 1.99 m (6 ft 6 in) | Lukoil Academic | (Bulgaria) |
| F | 41 | Aleksandar Vezenkov | 21 – 6 August 1995 | 2.06 m (6 ft 9 in) | FC Barcelona Bàsquet | (Spain) |
| C | 42 | Jason Washburn | 26 – 5 June 1990 | 2.10 m (6 ft 11 in) | Yokohama | (Japan) |

Head coach

- (Bulgaria) Lubomir Minchev

Assistant coach(es)

- (Bulgaria) Yavor Asparuhov
- (Bulgaria) Yordan Kolev

Legend

- (C) Team captain
- Club – describes last
  club before the tournament
- Age – describes age
  on 31 August 2016

=== Kosovo ===
Kosovo men's national basketball team roster
Players
Coaches

| Pos. | No. | Name | Age – Date of birth | Height | Club | Ctr. |
|---|---|---|---|---|---|---|
| G/F | 4 | Edmond Azemi (C) | 35 – 10 September 1980 | 2.00 m (6 ft 7 in) | Prishtina | (Kosovo) |
| F | 5 | Justin Doellman | 31 – 2 March 1985 | 2.08 m (6 ft 10 in) | Barcelona | (Spain) |
| G | 6 | Mirza Ahmetbašić | 28 – 23 November 1987 | 1.93 m (6 ft 4 in) | Bosna Royal | (Bosnia and Herzegovina) |
| SF | 7 | Yll Kaçaniku | 31 – 31 May 1985 | 2.02 m (6 ft 8 in) | İstanbulspor | (Turkey) |
| F | 8 | Alban Veseli | 26 – 10 January 1990 | 2.02 m (6 ft 8 in) | Peja | (Kosovo) |
| F | 9 | Granit Rugova | 30 – 13 September 1985 | 1.98 m (6 ft 6 in) | Prishtina | (Kosovo) |
| SG | 11 | Dardan Berisha | 27 – 15 November 1988 | 1.91 m (6 ft 3 in) | Polfarmex Kutno | (Poland) |
| F | 12 | Drilon Hajrizi | 25 – 17 January 1991 | 2.03 m (6 ft 8 in) | Peja | (Kosovo) |
| F | 13 | Samir Zekiqi | 21 – 23 January 1995 | 2.01 m (6 ft 7 in) | Peja | (Kosovo) |
| C | 15 | Gazmend Sinani | 25 – 22 June 1991 | 2.04 m (6 ft 8 in) | Prishtina | (Kosovo) |
| G | 23 | Jaren Sina | 22 – 12 March 1994 | 1.88 m (6 ft 2 in) | George Washington | (United States) |
| G/F | 25 | Scott Bamforth | 27 – 12 August 1989 | 1.88 m (6 ft 2 in) | Bilbao | (Spain) |
| PF | 35 | Fisnik Rugova | 26 – 26 October 1989 | 2.08 m (6 ft 10 in) | Prishtina | (Kosovo) |
| PG | 55 | Leonard Mekaj | 21 – 27 February 1995 | 1.82 m (6 ft 0 in) | Peja | (Kosovo) |

Head coach

- (Kosovo) Arben Krasniqi

Assistant coach(es)

- (Kosovo) Andin Rashica

Legend

- (C) Team captain
- Club – describes last
  club before the tournament
- Age – describes age,
  on 31 August 2016

=== Slovenia ===
Slovenia men's national basketball team roster
Players
Coaches

| Pos. | No. | Name | Age – Date of birth | Height | Club | Ctr. |
|---|---|---|---|---|---|---|
| PG | 1 | Matic Rebec | 21 – 24 January 1995 | 1.80 m (5 ft 11 in) | Krka | (Slovenia) |
| PG | 3 | Goran Dragić (C) | 30 – 6 May 1986 | 1.91 m (6 ft 3 in) | Miami Heat | (United States) |
| SG | 7 | Klemen Prepelič | 23 – 20 October 1992 | 1.91 m (6 ft 3 in) | Limoges CSP | (France) |
| SF | 8 | Edo Murić | 24 – 27 November 1991 | 2.02 m (6 ft 8 in) | Banvit B.K. | (Turkey) |
| SG | 9 | Jaka Blažič | 26 – 30 June 1990 | 1.96 m (6 ft 5 in) | Laboral Kutxa | (Spain) |
| SG | 12 | Zoran Dragić | 27 – 22 June 1989 | 1.96 m (6 ft 5 in) | EA7 Emporio Armani Milano | (Italy) |
| SG | 13 | Miha Lapornik | 22 – 18 October 1993 | 1.94 m (6 ft 4 in) | Bilbao Basket | (Spain) |
| C | 14 | Gašper Vidmar | 28 – 14 September 1987 | 2.11 m (6 ft 11 in) | Banvit B.K. | (Turkey) |
| PF | 15 | Gëzim Morina | 23 – 12 December 1992 | 2.03 m (6 ft 8 in) | Lastovka | (Slovenia) |
| PF | 17 | Saša Zagorac | 32 – 1 January 1984 | 2.06 m (6 ft 9 in) | PBC Lukoil Academic | (Bulgaria) |
| C | 22 | Žiga Dimec | 23 – 20 February 1993 | 2.11 m (6 ft 11 in) | Krka | (Slovenia) |
| C | 23 | Alen Omić | 24 – 6 May 1992 | 2.15 m (7 ft 1 in) | Anadolu Efes S.K. | (Turkey) |
| G | 24 | Jaka Klobučar | 28 – 19 August 1987 | 1.98 m (6 ft 6 in) | İstanbul BB | (Turkey) |
| SF | 31 | Vlatko Čančar | 19 – 10 April 1997 | 2.03 m (6 ft 8 in) | Mega Leks | (Serbia) |

Head coach

- (Serbia) Igor Kokoškov

Assistant coach(es)

- (Slovenia) Rado Trifunović
- (Slovenia) Aleksander Sekulić
- (Slovenia) Jaka Lakovič

Legend

- Club – describes last
  club before the tournament
- Age – describes age
  on 1 July 2016

=== Ukraine ===
Ukraine men's national basketball team roster
Players
Coaches

| Pos. | No. | Name | Age – Date of birth | Height | Club | Ctr. |
|---|---|---|---|---|---|---|
| PG | 4 | Klym Artamonov | 22 – 5 November 1993 | 1.86 m (6 ft 1 in) | BIPA Odesa | (Ukraine) |
| SF | 5 | Vladimir Konev | 27 – 18 June 1989 | 2.03 m (6 ft 8 in) | BC Khimik | (Ukraine) |
| PG | 6 | Olexandr Mishula | 24 – 18 April 1992 | 1.94 m (6 ft 4 in) | BC Dnipro | (Ukraine) |
| PG | 7 | Denys Lukashov | 27 – 30 April 1989 | 1.88 m (6 ft 2 in) | Lietuvos Rytas | (Lithuania) |
| C | 8 | Kyrylo Fesenko | 29 – 24 December 1986 | 2.16 m (7 ft 1 in) | Lokomotiv Kuban | (Russia) |
| SG | 9 | Ruslan Otverchenko | 26 – 6 January 1990 | 1.94 m (6 ft 4 in) | ICL Manresa | (Spain) |
| SF | 10 | Dmytro Gliebov | 28 – 20 July 1988 | 1.98 m (6 ft 6 in) | SC Kryvbas | (Ukraine) |
| SG | 11 | Oleksandr Lypovyy | 24 – 9 October 1991 | 2.00 m (6 ft 7 in) | Trikala Aries | (Greece) |
| PF | 12 | Maksym Korniyenko | 29 – 26 June 1987 | 2.06 m (6 ft 9 in) | Lukoil Academic | (Bulgaria) |
| SF | 13 | Vyacheslav Bobrov | 23 – 19 September 1992 | 2.02 m (6 ft 8 in) | UJAP Quimper 29 | (France) |
| C | 14 | Artem Pustovyi | 24 – 25 June 1992 | 2.18 m (7 ft 2 in) | Obradoiro CAB | (Spain) |
| C | 15 | Viacheslav Kravtsov | 29 – 25 August 1987 | 2.13 m (7 ft 0 in) | CAI Zaragoza | (Spain) |
| PG | 19 | Oleksandr Ryabchuk | 27 – 15 January 1989 | 1.91 m (6 ft 3 in) | BC Khimik | (Ukraine) |

Head coach

- (Ukraine) Yevgen Murzin

Assistant coach(es)

- (Ukraine) Alexander Lokhmanchuk
- (Ukraine) Leonid Ivatin
- (Ukraine) Yaroslav Zubrytskyy

Legend

- Club – describes last
  club before the tournament
- Age – describes age
  on 31 August 2016

== Group F ==
=== Albania ===
Albania men's national basketball team roster
Players
Coaches

| Pos. | No. | Name | Age – Date of birth | Height | Club | Ctr. |
|---|---|---|---|---|---|---|
| SG | 5 | Redi Vogli | 29 – 29 April 1987 | 1.95 m (6 ft 5 in) | PBC Tirana | (Albania) |
| SF | 6 | Celis Taflaj | 18 – 12 March 1998 | 2.01 m (6 ft 7 in) | Viola Reggio Calabria | (Italy) |
| PG | 7 | Algert Gjonaj | 28 – 18 October 1987 | 1.98 m (6 ft 6 in) | BC Vllaznia | (Albania) |
| PG | 9 | Mired Jani | 26 – 14 March 1990 | 1.90 m (6 ft 3 in) | PBC Tirana | (Albania) |
| PG | 10 | Elvisi Dusha | 22 – 15 July 1994 | 1.88 m (6 ft 2 in) | Sigal Prishtina | (Kosovo) |
| PG | 11 | Genti Lasku | 31 – 24 March 1985 | 1.83 m (6 ft 0 in) | PBC Tirana | (Albania) |
| PF | 12 | Abdel Gjyzeli | 23 – 24 March 1993 | 2.04 m (6 ft 8 in) | PBC Tirana | (Albania) |
| SG | 13 | Adriano Topalli | 22 – 1 February 1994 | 1.90 m (6 ft 3 in) |
| C | 14 | Endrit Hysenagolli | 28 – 5 July 1988 | 2.01 m (6 ft 7 in) | Bashkimi Prizren | (Kosovo) |
| PF | 15 | Gerti Shima | 30 – 9 May 1986 | 2.02 m (6 ft 8 in) | Sigal Prishtina | (Kosovo) |
| SG | 16 | Aldor Kola | 26 – 5 June 1990 | 1.95 m (6 ft 5 in) | Florida National | (United States) |
| PG | 17 | Robert Shestani | 23 – 13 September 1993 | 1.87 m (6 ft 2 in) | BC Kamza Basket | (Albania) |
| C | 19 | Denis Deda | 26 – 8 May 1990 | 2.08 m (6 ft 10 in) |
| PG | 23 | Rashaun Broadus | 32 – 5 August 1984 | 1.80 m (5 ft 11 in) | Dąbrowa Górnicza | (Poland) |

Head coach

- (Cyprus) Antonis Constantinides

Assistant coach(es)

- (Albania) Afrim Bilali
- (United States) Eni Cuka

Legend

- Club – describes last
  club as of 1 July 2016
- Age – describes age
  as of 1 July 2016

=== Georgia ===
Georgia men's national basketball team roster
Players
Coaches

| Pos. | No. | Name | Age – Date of birth | Height | Club | Ctr. |
|---|---|---|---|---|---|---|
| SG | 2 | Besik Lezhava | 30 – 21 February 1986 | 1.92 m (6 ft 4 in) | BC Batumi | (Georgia (country)) |
| PG | 3 | Michael Dixon | 25 – 1 December 1990 | 1.86 m (6 ft 1 in) | AEK Athens | (Greece) |
| SF | 5 | Luka Zakradze | 20 – 10 April 1996 | 1.92 m (6 ft 4 in) | Dinamo Tbilisi | (Georgia (country)) |
| SG | 6 | Anatoli Boisa | 32 – 9 September 1983 | 1.94 m (6 ft 4 in) | BC Kutaisi 2010 | (Georgia (country)) |
| C | 7 | Zaza Pachulia (C) | 32 – 10 February 1984 | 2.11 m (6 ft 11 in) | Golden State Warriors | (United States) |
| PG | 8 | Giorgi Tsintsadze | 30 – 7 February 1986 | 1.92 m (6 ft 4 in) | Rouen Métropole | (France) |
| C | 9 | Giorgi Shermadini | 27 – 2 April 1989 | 2.16 m (7 ft 1 in) | BC Andorra | (Spain) |
| SF | 10 | Duda Sanadze | 24 – 25 July 1992 | 1.96 m (6 ft 5 in) | KK Lastovka | (Slovenia) |
| SF | 13 | Viktor Sanikidze | 30 – 1 April 1986 | 2.03 m (6 ft 8 in) | Aris B.C. | (Greece) |
| PF | 15 | Beka Burjanadze | 22 – 3 January 1994 | 2.03 m (6 ft 8 in) | BC Andorra | (Spain) |
| SG | 16 | Kakha Jintcharadze | 23 – 16 July 1993 | 1.95 m (6 ft 5 in) | BC Armia | (Georgia (country)) |
| PF | 23 | Tornike Shengelia | 24 – 5 October 1991 | 2.07 m (6 ft 9 in) | Saski Baskonia | (Spain) |
| C | 35 | Beka Bekauri | 25 – 18 January 1991 | 2.07 m (6 ft 9 in) | BC Kutaisi 2010 | (Georgia (country)) |

Head coach

- (Greece) Ilias Zouros

Assistant coach(es)

- (Slovenia) Jurica Golemac
- (Croatia) Tihomir Bujan
- (Serbia) Miloš Gligorijević
- (Georgia (country)) Irakli Khoshtaria
- (Georgia (country)) Kote Tugushi

Legend

- Club – describes last
  club before the tournament
- Age – describes age
  on 9 September 2016

=== Montenegro ===
Montenegro men's national basketball team roster
Players
Coaches

| Pos. | No. | Name | Age – Date of birth | Height | Club |
|---|---|---|---|---|---|---|
| F/C | 4 | Nikola Vučević | 25 – 24 October 1990 | 2.13 m (7 ft 0 in) | Orlando Magic | (United States) |
| SG | 5 | Vladimir Mihailović | 25 – 3 September 1990 | 1.94 m (6 ft 4 in) | s.Oliver Würzburg | (Germany) |
| PG | 7 | Nikola Pavličević | 28 – 13 August 1988 | 1.94 m (6 ft 4 in) | Union Olimpija | (Slovenia) |
| SG | 8 | Dino Radončić | 17 – 8 January 1999 | 2.01 m (6 ft 7 in) | Real Madrid | (Spain) |
| PF | 9 | Danilo Nikolić | 23 – 8 April 1993 | 2.05 m (6 ft 9 in) | Bilbao Basket | (Spain) |
| PG | 10 | Derek Needham | 25 – 20 October 1990 | 1.80 m (5 ft 11 in) | Pallacanestro Reggiana | (Italy) |
| PF | 11 | Marko Todorović | 24 – 19 April 1992 | 2.10 m (6 ft 11 in) | BC Khimki | (Russia) |
| PF | 14 | Bojan Dubljević | 24 – 24 October 1991 | 2.05 m (6 ft 9 in) | Valencia BC | (Spain) |
| PF | 15 | Ivan Maraš | 24 – 24 October 1991 | 2.05 m (6 ft 9 in) | Tsmoki Minsk | (Belarus) |
| PG | 20 | Nikola Ivanović | 30 – 20 April 1986 | 2.03 m (6 ft 8 in) | AEK Athens | (Greece) |
| SG | 21 | Nemanja Vranješ | 28 – 11 May 1988 | 1.91 m (6 ft 3 in) | Budućnost | (Montenegro) |
| SF | 22 | Nemanja Đurišić | 24 – 23 February 1992 | 2.06 m (6 ft 9 in) | Stelmet Zielona Góra | (Poland) |
| F | 23 | Vladimir Dašić | 28 – 13 May 1988 | 2.08 m (6 ft 10 in) | Ulcinj | (Montenegro) |
| PG | 24 | Petar Popović | 19 – 13 September 1996 | 1.89 m (6 ft 2 in) | Budućnost | (Montenegro) |

Head coach

- (Montenegro) Bogdan Tanjević

Assistant coach(es)

- (Montenegro) Veljko Perović
- (Montenegro) Boško Radović

Legend

- (C) – Team captain
- Club – describes last
  club before the tournament
- Age – describes age
  on 31 August 2016

=== Slovakia ===
Slovakia men's national basketball team roster
Players
Coaches

| Pos. | No. | Name | Age – Date of birth | Height | Club | Ctr. |
|---|---|---|---|---|---|---|
| PG | 4 | Dalibor Hlivak | 21 – 25 May 1995 | 1.90 m (6 ft 3 in) | Karlovka Bratislava | (Slovakia) |
| PG | 5 | Simon Krajcovic | 22 – 14 February 1994 | 1.88 m (6 ft 2 in) | Astrum Levice | (Slovakia) |
| SG | 6 | Stanislav Baldovsky | 27 – 14 February 1989 | 1.93 m (6 ft 4 in) | Slávia TU Košice | (Slovakia) |
| SF | 7 | Marek Jass | 26 – 5 March 1990 | 1.95 m (6 ft 5 in) | Prievidza | (Slovakia) |
| PG | 8 | Milan Ziak | 27 – 18 October 1988 | 1.90 m (6 ft 3 in) | Slávia TU Košice | (Slovakia) |
| SG | 9 | Martin Bilik | 29 – 15 January 1987 | 1.94 m (6 ft 4 in) | Inter Bratislava | (Slovakia) |
| SG | 10 | Nenad Milošević | 33 – 2 May 1983 | 1.90 m (6 ft 3 in) | Inter Bratislava | (Slovakia) |
| SF | 11 | Richard Korner | 25 – 6 December 1990 | 1.98 m (6 ft 6 in) | Prievidza | (Slovakia) |
| C | 12 | Martin Bachan | 20 – 24 September 1995 | 2.03 m (6 ft 8 in) | Iskra Svit | (Slovakia) |
| PF | 13 | Boris Belavy | 21 – 14 June 1995 | 2.01 m (6 ft 7 in) | Iskra Svit | (Slovakia) |
| C | 14 | Michal Batka | 29 – 29 August 1987 | 2.04 m (6 ft 8 in) | Slávia TU Košice | (Slovakia) |
| C | 15 | Boris Bojanovsky | 23 – 15 April 1993 | 2.13 m (7 ft 0 in) | Anwil Włocławek | (Poland) |
| PG | 19 | Oliver Tot | 21 – 30 November 1994 | 1.98 m (6 ft 6 in) | William & Mary | (United States) |

Head coach

- (Croatia) Ivan Rudež

Assistant coach(es)

- (Slovakia) Jozef Lovik
- (Slovakia) Peter Torda

Legend

- Club – describes last
  club before the tournament
- Age – describes age
  on 31 August 2016

== Group G ==
=== Great Britain ===
Great Britain men's national basketball team roster
Players
Coaches

| Pos. | No. | Name | Age – Date of birth | Height | Club |
|---|---|---|---|---|---|---|
| G | 0 | Benjamin Mockford | 27 – 18 August 1989 | 1.84 m (6 ft 0 in) | Cáceres | (Spain) |
| F | 1 | William Saunders | 25 – 3 April 1991 | 2.01 m (6 ft 7 in) | Pallacanestro Biella | (Italy) |
| G | 4 | Andrew Lawrence | 26 – 4 June 1990 | 1.90 m (6 ft 3 in) | San Sebastián Gipuzkoa | (Spain) |
| G | 5 | Teddy Okereafor | 23 – 2 November 1992 | 1.91 m (6 ft 3 in) | Rider Broncs | (United States) |
| G | 6 | Kyle Johnson | 27 – 31 December 1988 | 1.95 m (6 ft 5 in) | Novipiù Casale Monferrato | (Italy) |
| G | 7 | Ben Gordon | 33 – 4 April 1983 | 1.91 m (6 ft 3 in) | free agent |
| F | 10 | Daniel Clark | 27 – 16 September 1988 | 2.08 m (6 ft 10 in) | MoraBanc Andorra | (Andorra) |
| F | 11 | Gareth Murray | 31 – 23 September 1984 | 2.01 m (6 ft 7 in) | Glasgow Rocks | (United Kingdom) |
| C | 13 | Eric Boateng | 30 – 20 November 1985 | 2.08 m (6 ft 10 in) | ADA Blois | (France) |
| F | 20 | Kieron Achara | 33 – 3 July 1983 | 2.08 m (6 ft 10 in) | Glasgow Rocks | (United Kingdom) |
| G | 21 | Alexander Young | 22 – 28 March 1994 | 1.88 m (6 ft 2 in) | UC Irvine Anteaters | (United States) |
| C | 25 | Gabriel Olaseni | 24 – 29 December 1991 | 2.08 m (6 ft 10 in) | Dinamo Sassari | (Italy) |

Head coach

- (United States) Joe Prunty

Assistant coach(es)

- (Israel) Guy Goodes
- (United Kingdom) Nate Reinking

Legend

- Club – describes last
  club before the tournament
- Age – describes age
  on 31 August 2016

=== Hungary ===
Hungary men's national basketball team roster
Players
Coaches

| Pos. | No. | Name | Age – Date of birth | Height | Club |
|---|---|---|---|---|---|---|
| PG | 4 | Andras Rujak | 28 – 30 July 1988 | 1.88 m (6 ft 2 in) | Soproni | (Hungary) |
| C | 6 | Ákos Keller | 27 – 28 March 1989 | 2.09 m (6 ft 10 in) | TLI Alba Fehérvár | (Hungary) |
| G | 7 | Krisztián Wittmann | 31 – 22 May 1985 | 1.85 m (6 ft 1 in) | Szolnoki Olaj | (Hungary) |
| G | 8 | Ádám Hanga | 27 – 12 April 1989 | 2.01 m (6 ft 7 in) | Barcelona Lassa | (Spain) |
| F | 9 | Dávid Vojvoda | 25 – 4 September 1990 | 1.96 m (6 ft 5 in) | Szolnoki Olaj | (Hungary) |
| G | 10 | Peter Kovács | 26 – 25 October 1989 | 1.89 m (6 ft 2 in) | Falco Szombathely | (Hungary) |
| PF | 12 | Norbert Tóth | 29 – 4 September 1986 | 2.04 m (6 ft 8 in) | Falco Szombathely | (Hungary) |
| C | 13 | Ádám Tóth | 27 – 25 August 1989 | 2.08 m (6 ft 10 in) | Szolnoki Olaj | (Hungary) |
| F | 15 | Csaba Ferencz | 31 – 24 May 1985 | 1.94 m (6 ft 4 in) | BC Körmend | (Hungary) |
| SG | 20 | Zoltan Perl | 21 – 28 July 1995 | 1.94 m (6 ft 4 in) | Betaland Capo d'Orlando | (Italy) |
| PF | 22 | Janos Eilingsfeld | 25 – 5 February 1991 | 1.98 m (6 ft 6 in) | Szolnoki Olaj | (Hungary) |
| PG | 23 | Mate Pongo | 22 – 23 December 1993 | 1.85 m (6 ft 1 in) | KTE-Duna Aszfalt | (Hungary) |
| PG | 25 | Benedek Varadi | 21 – 5 February 1995 | 1.94 m (6 ft 4 in) | Falco Szombathely | (Hungary) |

Head coach

- (Montenegro) Stojan Ivković

Assistant coach(es)

- (Hungary) Gábor Forray
- (Hungary) Peter Por

Legend

- (C) Team captain
- Club – describes last
  club before the tournament
- Age – describes age
  on 31 August 2016

=== Luxembourg ===
Luxembourg men's national basketball team roster
Players
Coaches

| Pos. | No. | Name | Age – Date of birth | Height | Club | Ctr. |
|---|---|---|---|---|---|---|
| PG | 4 | Tom Schumacher | 29 – 26 February 1987 | 1.89 m (6 ft 2 in) | T71 Dudelange | (Luxembourg) |
| PG | 5 | Pitt Kostner | 24 – 20 June 1992 | 1.82 m (6 ft 0 in) | Soleuvre | (Luxembourg) |
| SG | 6 | Max Schmit | 24 – 19 January 1992 | 1.89 m (6 ft 2 in) | Résidence | (Luxembourg) |
| SF | 8 | Thomas Grun | 21 – February 28, 1995 | 1.98 m (6 ft 6 in) | Gladiators Trier | (Germany) |
| PG | 10 | Patrick Arbaut | 28 – 21 December 1987 | 1.85 m (6 ft 1 in) | Basket Esch | (Luxembourg) |
| PF | 11 | Jean Kox | 26 – 6 January 1990 | 1.99 m (6 ft 6 in) | Musel Pikes | (Luxembourg) |
| C | 12 | Joe Kalmes | 20 – 24 November 1995 | 2.00 m (6 ft 7 in) | Musel Pikes | (Luxembourg) |
| PF | 13 | Samy Picard | 28 – 8 June 1988 | 1.95 m (6 ft 5 in) | Amicale Steinsel | (Luxembourg) |
| PF | 14 | Dean Gint | 25 – 28 March 1991 | 2.01 m (6 ft 7 in) | Sparta Bertrange | (Luxembourg) |
| SG | 21 | Raul Biernbaum | 26 – September 28, 1989 | 1.82 m (6 ft 0 in) | AB Contern | (Luxembourg) |
| PG | 22 | Bob Melcher | 21 – 9 December 1994 | 1.90 m (6 ft 3 in) | Amicale Steinsel | (Luxembourg) |
| SG | 23 | Jairo Delgado Ferreira | 31 – 17 July 1985 | 1.93 m (6 ft 4 in) | Etzella Ettelbruck | (Luxembourg) |
| C | 24 | Yann Wolff | 22 – 22 January 1994 | 1.98 m (6 ft 6 in) | Etzella Ettelbruck | (Luxembourg) |
| SF | 25 | Tom Welter | 22 – 16 December 1993 | 1.86 m (6 ft 1 in) | Musel Pikes | (Luxembourg) |
| PF | 31 | Alex Laurent | 23 – 6 June 1993 | 1.98 m (6 ft 6 in) | Amicale Steinsel | (Luxembourg) |

Head coach

- (Luxembourg) Ken Diederich

Assistant coach(es)

- (United States) Mike Smith

Legend

- Club – describes last
  club before the tournament
- Age – describes age
  on 31 August 2016

=== Macedonia ===
Macedonia men's national basketball team roster
Players
Coaches

| Pos. | No. | Name | Age – Date of birth | Height | Club | Ctr. |
|---|---|---|---|---|---|---|
| SG | 4 | Dimitar Karadžovski | 31 – 7 October 1984 | 1.90 m (6 ft 3 in) | Kumanovo | (North Macedonia) |
| SG | 6 | Adem Mekić | 20 – 28 December 1995 | 1.95 m (6 ft 5 in) | MZT Skopje | (North Macedonia) |
| PG | 7 | Aleksandar Kostoski | 28 – 5 March 1988 | 1.88 m (6 ft 2 in) | Kumanovo | (North Macedonia) |
| SF | 8 | Vojdan Stojanovski (C) | 28 – 9 December 1987 | 1.97 m (6 ft 6 in) | Baloncesto Sevilla | (Spain) |
| SF | 9 | Damjan Stojanovski | 28 – 9 December 1987 | 1.97 m (6 ft 6 in) | free agent |
| C | 10 | Marko Dujković | 26 – 21 March 1990 | 2.26 m (7 ft 5 in) | free agent |
| F | 11 | Stojan Gjuroski | 24 – 6 November 1991 | 2.03 m (6 ft 8 in) | Kožuv | (North Macedonia) |
| C | 12 | Bojan Krstevski | 27 – 4 June 1989 | 2.08 m (6 ft 10 in) | Rabotnički | (North Macedonia) |
| C | 13 | Ljubomir Mladenovski | 21 – 2 May 1995 | 2.10 m (6 ft 11 in) | MZT Skopje | (North Macedonia) |
| PF | 14 | Marjan Janevski | 28 – 26 February 1988 | 2.03 m (6 ft 8 in) | Kumanovo | (North Macedonia) |
| PF | 15 | Kiril Nikolovski | 28 – 9 June 1988 | 2.10 m (6 ft 11 in) | Feni Industries | (North Macedonia) |
| PG | 19 | Andrej Magdevski | 20 – 14 January 1996 | 1.92 m (6 ft 4 in) | Free Agent |
| PF | 24 | Romeo Travis | 31 – 10 December 1984 | 2.03 m (6 ft 8 in) | Pallacanestro Cantù | (Italy) |

Head coach

- (Serbia) Dragan Raca

Assistant coach(es)

- (North Macedonia) Vrbica Stefanov
- (Serbia) Đorđe Jovičić

Legend

- Club – describes last
  team before the tournament
- Age – describes age
  on 5 September 2016
