= EuroBasket 2017 qualification =

This article describes the qualification procedure for EuroBasket 2017.

== Qualification format ==
All teams which didn't qualify yet for EuroBasket 2017 were divided into six groups of four teams and one more of three. The winners of each group and the four best second-placed teams qualified for the final tournament.

Kosovo made its first international appearance while Albania and Cyprus came back to the competition after absenting from the last edition.

Russian Basketball Federation was suspended by FIBA in July 2015, but later their membership was restored in November 2015.

=== Seedings ===
In the qualifying round, 27 teams were drawn into six groups of four teams and one group of three teams. The winners of each group and the four best second-placed teams qualified for EuroBasket 2017. The games were played between 31 August and 17 September 2016.

Teams were seeded following the results in the last EuroBasket or qualifiers.

Pot 1	Pot 2	Pot 3	Pot 4
**Poland**; **Slovenia**; **Belgium**; **Georgia**; **Russia**; **Germany**; Macedonia	Estonia; Netherlands; **Ukraine**; Bosnia and Herzegovina; **Iceland**; **Hungary**; **Montenegro**	Austria; Sweden; Belarus; Switzerland; Bulgaria; **Great Britain**; Slovakia	Portugal; Denmark; Luxembourg; Cyprus; Albania; Kosovo

- Teams marked in **bold** have qualified for EuroBasket 2017.

== Groups ==
All times are local.

=== Group A ===
Pos	Team	Pld	W	L	PF	PA	PD	Pts	Qualification
1	Belgium	6	5	1	459	361	+98	11	EuroBasket 2017
2	Iceland	6	4	2	466	429	+37	10	EuroBasket 2017
3	Cyprus	6	2	4	399	450	−51	8	
4	Switzerland	6	1	5	430	514	−84	7	

Source: FIBA
Rules for classification: 1) Points; 2) Head-to-head results; 3) Points difference; 4) Points scored.

31 August 2016
18:00

Boxscore

Belgium	65–46	Cyprus
Scoring by quarter: 16–11, 20–9, 13–14, 16–12
Pts: De Zeeuw 12; Rebs: Iarochevitch 10; Asts: De Zeeuw 6		Pts: Koronides 13; Rebs: King 5 Asts: Michail, Panteli 1

Lotto Arena, Antwerp
Attendance: 1,200
Referees: Vicente Bultó (ESP), Gentian Cici (ALB), Zdenko Tomašovič (SVK)

31 August 2016
19:30

Boxscore

Iceland	88–72	Switzerland
Scoring by quarter: 24–16, 23–13, 17–25, 24–18
Pts: Vilhjálmsson 16; Rebs: Bæringsson 9 Asts: Vilhjálmsson 8		Pts: M. Mlađan 19; Rebs: Savoy 8 Asts: Savoy 5

Laugardalshöll, Reykjavík
Attendance: 2,100
Referees: Petri Mäntylä (FIN), Saverio Lanzarini (ITA), Torkild Rodsand (NOR)

3 September 2016
17:00

Boxscore

Cyprus	64–75	Iceland
Scoring by quarter: 19–19, 13–12, 15–25, 17–19
Pts: Koronides, Panteli 9 Rebs: King 6 Asts: Koronides, Pantouris 2		Pts: Hermannsson 21; Rebs: Bæringsson 10; Asts: Bæringsson, Hermannsson 6

Eleftheria Indoor Hall, Nicosia
Attendance: 1,000
Referees: Seffi Shemmesh (ISR), Ingus Baumanis (LAT), Aleksander Pavlov (MKD)

3 September 2016
17:30

Boxscore

Switzerland	72–87	Belgium
Scoring by quarter: 16–24, 20–17, 23–26, 13–20
Pts: D. Mlađan, Ramseier 15; Rebs: Cotture 6 Asts: Cotture 4		Pts: Obasohan 18; Rebs: Tumba 7 Asts: Tabu 6

Site Sportif Saint-Leonard, Fribourg
Attendance: 1,000
Referees: Miloš Koljenšić (MNE), Andrei Sharapa (BLR), Marko Vladic (AUT)

7 September 2016
19:30

Boxscore

Switzerland	76–80	Cyprus
Scoring by quarter: 25–18, 20–20, 15–18, 16–24
Pts: Ramseier 22; Rebs: Ramseier 7 Asts: D. Mlađan, Savoy 3		Pts: King 21; Rebs: King 9 Asts: Koronides 8

Site Sportif Saint-Leonard, Fribourg
Attendance: 300
Referees: Boris Gabara (SVK), Gavin Williams (WAL), Dariusz Zapolski (POL)

7 September 2016
20:00

Boxscore

Belgium	80–65	Iceland
Scoring by quarter: 20–14, 20–25, 24–14, 16–12
Pts: De Zeeuw 22; Rebs: De Zeeuw 9 Asts: Tabu 5		Pts: Pálsson 21; Rebs: Bæringsson 6 Asts: Bæringsson 7

Lotto Arena, Antwerp
Attendance: 1,200
Referees: Miguel Pérez Pérez (ESP), Haris Bijedić (BIH), Christof Madinger (GER)

10 September 2016
17:00

Boxscore

Cyprus	55–72	Belgium
Scoring by quarter: 14–21, 7–22, 18–16, 16–13
Pts: Stylianou 16; Rebs: King 5 Asts: King 3		Pts: Boukichou 13; Rebs: De Zeeuw, Tumba 6 Asts: three players 3

Eleftheria Indoor Hall, Nicosia
Attendance: 1,000
Referees: Uroš Obrknežević (SRB), Ofer Manheim (ISR), Milan Nedović (SLO)

10 September 2016
17:30

Boxscore

Switzerland	83–80	Iceland
Scoring by quarter: 15–18, 25–23, 16–13, 27–26
Pts: Ramseier 19; Rebs: Kazadi 6 Asts: Savoy 7		Pts: Hermannsson 19; Rebs: Bæringsson 11; Asts: Vilhjálmsson 7

Site Sportif Saint-Leonard, Fribourg
Attendance: 500
Referees: Fernando Calatrava (ESP), Alija Ferevski (MKD), Saulius Racys (SWE)

14 September 2016
20:00

Boxscore

Belgium	87–49	Switzerland
Scoring by quarter: 19–9, 14–7, 32–17, 22–16
Pts: Tabu 20; Rebs: Tumba 13; Asts: three players 3		Pts: Kazadi 9 Rebs: Cotture 5 Asts: three players 2

Lotto Arena, Antwerp
Attendance: 3,000
Referees: Borys Shulga (UKR), Michał Proc (POL), Gintaras Vitkauskas (LTU)

14 September 2016
20:15

Boxscore

Iceland	84–62	Cyprus
Scoring by quarter: 17–20, 25–16, 27–10, 15–16
Pts: Bæringsson 18; Rebs: Bæringsson 9 Asts: Vilhjálmsson 5		Pts: Sizopoulos 12; Rebs: King 10; Asts: King, Koronides 3

Laugardalshöll, Reykjavík
Attendance: 1,600
Referees: Rain Peerandi (EST), Stanislav Kučera (CZE), Paul Walton (ENG)

17 September 2016
17:00

Boxscore

Cyprus	92–78	Switzerland
Scoring by quarter: 19–19, 18–22, 24–14, 31–23
Pts: Stylianou 26; Rebs: King, Theocharides 7 Asts: Koronides, Stylianou 5		Pts: Savoy 19; Rebs: Ramseier 9 Asts: Mlađan 6

Eleftheria Indoor Hall, Nicosia
Attendance: 300
Referees: Radomir Vojinović (MNE), Tamas Földhazi (HUN), Luka Kardum (CRO)

17 September 2016
16:00

Boxscore

Iceland	74–68	Belgium
Scoring by quarter: 14–21, 20–16, 19–12, 21–19
Pts: Hermannsson 18; Rebs: Bæringsson, Pálsson 4 Asts: Vilhjálmsson 6		Pts: Salumu 24; Rebs: Tabu 8 Asts: four players 2

Laugardalshöll, Reykjavík
Attendance: 2,400
Referees: Haydn Jones (WAL), Chris Dodds (SCO), Torkild Rødsand (NOR)

=== Group B ===
Pos	Team	Pld	W	L	PF	PA	PD	Pts	Qualification
1	Germany	6	4	2	495	423	+72	10 (Note: Head-to-head results: Germany 153–126 Netherlands)	EuroBasket 2017
2	Netherlands	6	4	2	461	449	+12	10	
3	Austria	6	2	4	411	438	−27	8 (Note: Head-to-head results: Austria 158–152 Denmark)	
4	Denmark	6	2	4	492	549	−57	8	

Source: FIBA
Rules for classification: 1) Points; 2) Head-to-head results; 3) Points difference; 4) Points scored.
Notes:

31 August 2016
19:30

Boxscore

Germany	101–74	Denmark
Scoring by quarter: 25–19, 27–19, 20–19, 29–17
Pts: Lô, Zipser 17; Rebs: Pleiß 9 Asts: Doreth 8		Pts: Gilling 18; Rebs: Bergstedt 4 Asts: Darboe 4

Sparkassen-Arena, Kiel
Attendance: 5,045
Referees: Carlos Peruga (ESP), Sigmundur Herbertsson (ISL), Vladan Šundić (MNE)

31 August 2016
20:00

Boxscore

Netherlands	72–75	Austria
Scoring by quarter: 20–18, 14–25, 15–14, 23–18
Pts: W. De Jong 24; Rebs: Kloof 8 Asts: Kloof 4		Pts: Mahalbašić 15; Rebs: Schreiner 5 Asts: three players 5

Vijf Meihal, Leiden
Attendance: 1,000
Referees: Sreten Radović (CRO), Aliaksandr Syrytsa (BLR), Sergii Tyslenko (UKR)

3 September 2016
19:00

Boxscore

Denmark	72–90	Netherlands
Scoring by quarter: 13–28, 16–12, 15–27, 28–23
Pts: Voskuil 16; Rebs: Bergstedt 7 Asts: three players 2		Pts: W. De Jong 15; Rebs: Van der Mars 6 Asts: Schaftenaar 4

Forum Horsens, Horsens
Attendance: 748
Referees: Aleksandar Milojević (MKD), Manuel Mazzoni (ITA), Artūras Šukys (LTU)

3 September 2016
20:20

Boxscore

Austria	59–61	Germany
Scoring by quarter: 25–16, 14–13, 14–13, 6–19
Pts: Mahalbašić 18; Rebs: Mahalbašić 7 Asts: four players 3		Pts: Barthel 12; Rebs: Barthel, Zipser 7 Asts: Lô 3

Multiversum, Schwechat
Attendance: 1,800
Referees: Sašo Petek (SLO), Saverio Lanzarini (ITA), Igor Mitrovski (MKD)

7 September 2016
19:10

Boxscore

Austria	86–66	Denmark
Scoring by quarter: 30–22, 15–8, 24–14, 17–22
Pts: Lamesic 14; Rebs: Mahalbašić 11; Asts: Lanegger, Maresch 7		Pts: Voskuil 22; Rebs: Voskuil 5 Asts: Voskuil 6

Multiversum, Schwechat
Attendance: 700
Referees: Marko Juras (SRB), Mārtiņš Kozlovskis (LAT), Simon Unsworth (ENG)

7 September 2016
19:30

Boxscore

Germany	71–75	Netherlands
Scoring by quarter: 19–16, 16–24, 17–17, 19–18
Pts: Zipser 14; Rebs: Theis 8 Asts: Lô 8		Pts: Kloof 20; Rebs: Kloof 8 Asts: Kloof 3

König Pilsener Arena, Oberhausen
Attendance: 4,686
Referees: Óscar Perea (ESP), Amit Balak (ISR), Mario Majkić (SLO)

10 September 2016
19:00

Boxscore

Denmark	106–102 (3OT)	Germany
Scoring by quarter: 16–18, 32–19, 14–19, 11–17, Overtime: 11–11, 8–8, 14–10
Pts: Voskuil 22; Rebs: Rungby 11; Asts: Gilling 5		Pts: Barthel 26; Rebs: Barthel 10; Asts: Lô 9

Naestved Hallerne, Naestved
Attendance: 800
Referees: Fernando Rocha (POR), Sergey Mikhaylov (RUS), Zafer Yılmaz (TUR)

10 September 2016
20:20

Boxscore

Austria	61–75	Netherlands
Scoring by quarter: 23–21, 15–18, 7–19, 16–17
Pts: Mahalbašić 19; Rebs: Lamesic 8 Asts: Murati 5		Pts: W. De Jong, Voorn 19; Rebs: Van der Mars 9 Asts: Voorn 4

Multiversum, Schwechat
Attendance: 1,050
Referees: Saverio Lanzarini (ITA), Marek Kúkelčík (SVK), Mart Uuehendrik (EST)

14 September 2016
19:30

Boxscore

Germany	78–58	Austria
Scoring by quarter: 23–19, 20–9, 15–18, 20–12
Pts: Voigtmann 19; Rebs: Voigtmann 10; Asts: Lô 5		Pts: Mahalbašić 21; Rebs: Mahalbašić, Trmal 6 Asts: Schreiner 5

Brose Arena, Bamberg
Attendance: 3,117
Referees: Francisco Araña (ESP), Ognjen Jokić (MNE), Oskars Lucis (LAT)

14 September 2016
20:00

Boxscore

Netherlands	98–88 (OT)	Denmark
Scoring by quarter: 22–21, 18–24, 20–19, 18–14, Overtime: 20–10
Pts: W. De Jong 20; Rebs: Schaftenaar 11; Asts: Kloof 6		Pts: Bergstedt 23; Rebs: Bergstedt 7 Asts: Darboe 7

Vijf Meihal, Leiden
Attendance: 1,218
Referees: Aare Halliko (EST), Alexey Davydov (RUS), Johann Jeanneau (FRA)

17 September 2016
17:30

Boxscore

Denmark	86–72	Austria
Scoring by quarter: 21–9, 19–17, 21–25, 25–21
Pts: Voskuil 17; Rebs: Bergstedt 7 Asts: Jukić, Seilund 4		Pts: Schreiner 15; Rebs: Mahalbašić 10; Asts: Lanegger, Maresch 3

Naestved Hallerne, Naestved
Attendance: 800
Referees: Robert Viklický (CZE), Michel Glod (LUX), Tanel Suslov (EST)

17 September 2016
20:00

Boxscore

Netherlands	51–82	Germany
Scoring by quarter: 16–19, 10–21, 13–22, 12–20
Pts: Kloof 18; Rebs: W. De Jong 5 Asts: W. De Jong, Schaftenaar 2		Pts: Voigtmann 15; Rebs: Lô 11; Asts: Lô 6

Vijf Meihal, Leiden
Attendance: 2,000
Referees: Ilija Belošević (SRB), Igor Dragojević (MNE), Tolga Sahin (ITA)

=== Group C ===
Pos	Team	Pld	W	L	PF	PA	PD	Pts	Qualification
1	Russia	4	4	0	309	253	+56	8	EuroBasket 2017
2	Bosnia and Herzegovina	4	2	2	273	308	−35	6	
3	Sweden	4	0	4	279	300	−21	4	

Source: FIBA
Rules for classification: 1) Points; 2) Head-to-head results; 3) Points difference; 4) Points scored.

31 August 2016
20:00

Boxscore

Russia	83–54	Bosnia and Herzegovina
Scoring by quarter: 19–20, 15–15, 27–10, 22–9
Pts: Kulagin 17; Rebs: Karasev 9 Asts: Antonov, Khvostov 5		Pts: Nurkić 19; Rebs: Nurkić 15; Asts: Gordić 3

Universal Sports Palace Molot, Perm
Attendance: 7,000
Referees: Elias Koromilas (GRE), Tolga Sahin (ITA), Robert Vyklický (CZE)

3 September 2016
20:15

Boxscore

Bosnia and Herzegovina	74–71	Sweden
Scoring by quarter: 25–16, 15–19, 10–15, 24–21
Pts: Musa, Nurkić 19; Rebs: Nurkić 15; Asts: Musa, Zahiragić 3		Pts: Czerapowicz 16; Rebs: Engström 6 Asts: Borg, Håkanson 4

Dvorana Mirza Delibašić, Sarajevo
Attendance: 5,500
Referees: Daniel Hierrezuelo (ESP), Lorenzo Baldini (ITA), Tomasz Trawicki (POL)

7 September 2016
20:00

Boxscore

Sweden	73–85	Russia
Scoring by quarter: 8–21, 20–17, 24–23, 21–24
Pts: Spires 16; Rebs: Czerapowicz, Lindqvist 5 Asts: Håkanson, Massamba 5		Pts: Vorontsevich 20; Rebs: Zubkov 6 Asts: Khvostov 5

IFU Arena, Uppsala
Attendance: 2,280
Referees: Fernando Rocha (POR), Renaud Geller (BEL), Radomir Vojinović (MNE)

10 September 2016
20:15

Boxscore

Bosnia and Herzegovina	67–78	Russia
Scoring by quarter: 22–12, 17–19, 12–24, 16–23
Pts: Teletović 23; Rebs: Nurkić 13; Asts: Gordić 8		Pts: Mozgov 17; Rebs: Vorontsevich 8 Asts: Khvostov 5

Mejdan, Tuzla
Attendance: 4,500
Referees: Robert Lottermoser (GER), Aare Halliko (EST), Oļegs Latiševs (LAT)

14 September 2016
20:00

Boxscore

Sweden	76–78	Bosnia and Herzegovina
Scoring by quarter: 16–14, 19–23, 23–23, 18–18
Pts: Borg, Massamba 14; Rebs: three players 5 Asts: Håkanson 8		Pts: Nurkić 21; Rebs: Milošević 11; Asts: Gordić 4

Hovet, Stockholm
Attendance: 7,120
Referees: Miguel Pérez Pérez (ESP), Tomas Jasevičius (LTU), Piotr Pastusiak (POL)

17 September 2016
14:00

Boxscore

Russia	63–59	Sweden
Scoring by quarter: 12–18, 21–15, 18–8, 12–18
Pts: Bykov 15; Rebs: Mozgov 10; Asts: Bykov, Zubkov 4		Pts: Håkanson 15; Rebs: Spires 8 Asts: Håkanson 7

Basket-Hall, Krasnodar
Attendance: 7,500
Referees: Matej Boltauzer (SLO), Milivoje Jovčić (SRB), Emin Moğulkoç (TUR)

=== Group D ===
Pos	Team	Pld	W	L	PF	PA	PD	Pts	Qualification
1	Poland	6	5	1	490	413	+77	11	EuroBasket 2017
2	Estonia	6	3	3	429	444	−15	9 (Note: Head-to-head results: Estonia 144–141 Belarus)	
3	Belarus	6	3	3	430	437	−7	9	
4	Portugal	6	1	5	401	456	−55	7	

Source: FIBA
Rules for classification: 1) Points; 2) Head-to-head results; 3) Points difference; 4) Points scored.
Notes:

31 August 2016
19:10

Boxscore

Estonia	81–62	Belarus
Scoring by quarter: 18–10, 22–17, 21–15, 20–20
Pts: Veideman 32; Rebs: Kajupank 5 Asts: Veideman 7		Pts: Parakhouski 14; Rebs: Liutych, Meshcharakou 8 Asts: Korzh 4

Saku Suurhall, Tallinn
Attendance: 2,700
Referees: Petar Obradović (BIH), Sergiy Chebyshev (UKR), Anton Makhlin (RUS)

31 August 2016
20:00

Boxscore

Poland	83–57	Portugal
Scoring by quarter: 23–14, 12–19, 23–13, 25–11
Pts: Ponitka 14; Rebs: four players 6 Asts: Koszarek 4		Pts: Gomes 18; Rebs: Gomes 10; Asts: Fernandes 5

Hala Mistrzów, Włocławek
Attendance: 3,054
Referees: Emin Moğulkoç (TUR), Petr Hrůša (CZE), Konstatin Simonow (GER)

3 September 2016
18:30

Boxscore

Belarus	79–97	Poland
Scoring by quarter: 28–34, 20–19, 13–20, 18–24
Pts: Liutych 23; Rebs: Kudrautsau 6 Asts: Korzh 6		Pts: Lampe 25; Rebs: Lampe 8 Asts: Slaughter 6

Sports Palace, Minsk
Attendance: 1,800
Referees: Srđan Dožai (CRO), Arnis Ozols (LAT), Milija Vojinović (SRB)

3 September 2016
18:30

Boxscore

Portugal	68–76	Estonia
Scoring by quarter: 17–18, 12–22, 23–16, 16–20
Pts: Gomes 26; Rebs: Gomes 11; Asts: Fernandes 4		Pts: Veideman 16; Rebs: Dorbek 5 Asts: Sokk 4

Arena Dolce Vita, Ovar
Attendance: 2,000
Referees: Matej Boltauzer (SLO), Panagiotis Anastopoulos (GRE), Fernando Calatrava (ESP)

7 September 2016
18:30

Boxscore

Belarus	72–62	Portugal
Scoring by quarter: 23–14, 18–11, 11–18, 20–19
Pts: Parakhouski 16; Rebs: Parakhouski 10; Asts: Kudrautsau, Wayns 5		Pts: Gomes 21; Rebs: Gomes 11; Asts: Pinto 5

Sports Palace, Minsk
Attendance: 2,200
Referees: Alessandro Martolini (ITA), Vilius Mačiulaitis(LTU), Anastasios Manos (GRE)

7 September 2016
20:00

Boxscore

Poland	78–64	Estonia
Scoring by quarter: 21–14, 15–12, 19–23, 23–15
Pts: Lampe 17; Rebs: Lampe 11; Asts: four players 3		Pts: Kitsing 15; Rebs: Keedus, Kitsing 5 Asts: Kurbas 7

Globus Hall, Lublin
Attendance: 3,200
Referees: Saša Pukl(SLO), Martin Horozov (BUL), Milija Vojinović (SRB)

10 September 2016
18:30

Boxscore

Portugal	74–81	Poland
Scoring by quarter: 24–25, 12–20, 21–17, 17–19
Pts: Gomes, Vilhena 16; Rebs: Queiroz 9 Asts: Fernandes 6		Pts: Ponitka 17; Rebs: Zamojski 8 Asts: Waczyński 4

Pavilhão Salvador Machado, Oliveira de Azemeis
Attendance: 1,564
Referees: Miguel Pérez Pérez (ESP), Boris Krejič (SLO), Sergiy Zashchuk (UKR)

10 September 2016
18:30

Boxscore

Belarus	79–63	Estonia
Scoring by quarter: 24–20, 18–13, 17–14, 20–16
Pts: Liutych 19; Rebs: Liutych 11; Asts: Pustahvar, Wayns 4		Pts: Hallik 14; Rebs: Dorbek 7 Asts: Veideman 8

Sports Palace, Minsk
Referees: Milivoje Jovčić (SRB), Alexandru Olaru (ROU), Zdravko Rutešić (MNE)

14 September 2016
19:10

Boxscore

Estonia	82–63	Portugal
Scoring by quarter: 17–13, 14–14, 24–20, 27–16
Pts: Veideman 17; Rebs: five players 5 Asts: Sokk 9		Pts: Gomes 20; Rebs: Gomes 10; Asts: Fernandes 7

Saku Suurhall, Tallinn
Attendance: 3,500
Referees: Ilija Belošević (SRB), Gellért Kapitány (HUN), Marko Vučković (SLO)

14 September 2016
20:00

Boxscore

Poland	57–76	Belarus
Scoring by quarter: 10–13, 18–21, 15–21, 14–21
Pts: Ponitka 16; Rebs: Lampe 6 Asts: Koszarek, Slaughter 4		Pts: Wayns 21; Rebs: Parakhouski 10; Asts: Korzh 7

Arena Toruń, Toruń
Attendance: 2,900
Referees: Damir Javor (SLO), Ioannis Foufis (GRE), Aleksandar Glišić (SRB)

17 September 2016
18:30

Boxscore

Portugal	77–62	Belarus
Scoring by quarter: 13–15, 20–15, 21–17, 23–15
Pts: Vilhena 16; Rebs: Gomes 16; Asts: four players 3		Pts: Parakhouski 15; Rebs: Meshcharakou 7 Asts: Korzh, Kudrautsau 2

Pavilhão dos Desportos, Sines
Attendance: 1,000
Referees: David Chambon (FRA), Sebastien Clivaz (SUI), Carlos Peruga (ESP)

17 September 2016
19:10

Boxscore

Estonia	63–94	Poland
Scoring by quarter: 16–24, 11–22, 12–21, 24–27
Pts: Hallik 15; Rebs: Sokk, Veideman 5 Asts: Dorbek 8		Pts: Ponitka 16; Rebs: Gielo 10; Asts: Slaughter 6

University of Tartu Sports Hall, Tartu
Attendance: 1,800
Referees: Ademir Zurapović (BIH), Miloš Koljenšić (MNE), Yohan Rosso (FRA)

=== Group E ===
Pos	Team	Pld	W	L	PF	PA	PD	Pts	Qualification
1	Slovenia	6	6	0	536	436	+100	12	EuroBasket 2017
2	Ukraine	6	4	2	467	424	+43	10	EuroBasket 2017
3	Bulgaria	6	2	4	449	465	−16	8	
4	Kosovo	6	0	6	419	546	−127	6	

Source: FIBA
Rules for classification: 1) Points; 2) Head-to-head results; 3) Points difference; 4) Points scored.

31 August 2016
19:00

Boxscore

Ukraine	79–69	Bulgaria
Scoring by quarter: 17–10, 25–15, 21–22, 16–22
Pts: Fesenko 15; Rebs: Fesenko 10; Asts: Lypovyy 10		Pts: Kostov 16; Rebs: Georgiev 6 Asts: Velikov 5

Palace of Sports, Kyiv
Attendance: 5,500
Referees: Dragan Nešković (SRB), Andris Aunkrogers (LAT), Tomislav Hordov (CRO)

31 August 2016
20:00

Boxscore

Slovenia	113–68	Kosovo
Scoring by quarter: 33–19, 31–12, 20–18, 29–19
Pts: G. Dragić 22; Rebs: three players 6 Asts: G. Dragić 8		Pts: Berisha 21; Rebs: F. Rugova 7 Asts: Berisha, Doellman 3

Arena Stožice, Ljubljana
Attendance: 3,500
Referees: Carmelo Paternico (ITA), Marek Cmikiewicz (POL), David Romano (ISR)

3 September 2016
18:00

Boxscore

Bulgaria	78–83	Slovenia
Scoring by quarter: 9–22, 26–16, 20–21, 23–24
Pts: Vezenkov 22; Rebs: Ivanov 5 Asts: Velikov 5		Pts: G. Dragić 20; Rebs: Vidmar 9 Asts: G. Dragić 9

Arena Botevgrad, Botevgrad
Attendance: 3,500
Referees: Oļegs Latiševs (LAT), Erez Gurion (ISR), Jurgis Laurinavičius (LTU)

3 September 2016
20:00

Boxscore

Kosovo	63–70	Ukraine
Scoring by quarter: 17–17, 17–15, 18–20, 11–18
Pts: Doellman 20; Rebs: Hajrizi 6 Asts: Sina 6		Pts: Korniyenko 20; Rebs: three players 5 Asts: Lypovyy 5

Salla e sporteve Minatori, Mitrovica
Attendance: 2,500
Referees: Ciprian Stoica (ROU), Petri Mäntylä (FIN), Yohan Rosso (FRA)

7 September 2016
18:00

Boxscore

Bulgaria	105–84	Kosovo
Scoring by quarter: 22–25, 18–15, 32–16, 33–28
Pts: Georgiev 28; Rebs: Vezenkov, Zahariev 7 Asts: Bost 10		Pts: Berisha 18; Rebs: Doellman 7 Asts: Doellman 4

Arena Botevgrad, Botevgrad
Attendance: 2,000
Referees: Eddie Viator (FRA), Alexander Romanov (RUS), Andrei Sharapa (BLR)

7 September 2016
20:00

Boxscore

Slovenia	84–77	Ukraine
Scoring by quarter: 23–15, 25–24, 24–17, 12–21
Pts: Z. Dragić 28; Rebs: Z. Dragić 7 Asts: G. Dragić 11		Pts: Lukashov 14; Rebs: Bobrov, Fesenko 7 Asts: Lypovyy 6

Zlatorog Arena, Celje
Attendance: 2,000
Referees: Carlos Cortés (ESP), Wojciech Liszka (POL), Nicolas Maestre (FRA)

10 September 2016
18:00

Boxscore

Bulgaria	67–72	Ukraine
Scoring by quarter: 18–16, 11–19, 15–20, 23–17
Pts: Vezenkov 19; Rebs: Bost 5 Asts: Bost, Zahariev 2		Pts: Kravtsov 18; Rebs: Bobrov 10; Asts: Bobrov 5

Arena Botevgrad, Botevgrad
Attendance: 3,000
Referees: Siniša Herceg (CRO), Petar Denkovski (MKD), Markos Michaelides (SUI)

10 September 2016
20:00

Boxscore

Kosovo	81–91	Slovenia
Scoring by quarter: 21–17, 20–21, 21–30, 19–23
Pts: Doellman 30; Rebs: F. Rugova 6 Asts: Berisha 8		Pts: Prepelič 27; Rebs: Prepelič, Vidmar 9 Asts: Rebec 4

Salla e sporteve Minatori, Mitrovica
Attendance: 2,500
Referees: Emilio Pérez (ESP), Tomas Jasevičius (LTU), Piotr Pastusiak (POL)

14 September 2016
19:00

Boxscore

Ukraine	100–61	Kosovo
Scoring by quarter: 30–11, 25–17, 26–8, 19–25
Pts: Mishula 21; Rebs: Kravtsov 12; Asts: Korniyenko, Lypovyy 5		Pts: Berisha 20; Rebs: Berisha 5 Asts: Ahmetbašić 6

Sportima Arena, Vilnius, Lithuania
Attendance: 380
Referees: Tanel Suslov (EST), Lorenzo Baldini (ITA), Pavel Fuška (SVK)

14 September 2016
20:00

Boxscore

Slovenia	85–63	Bulgaria
Scoring by quarter: 16–21, 18–8, 35–6, 16–28
Pts: G. Dragić 17; Rebs: Murić 8 Asts: G. Dragić 10		Pts: Washburn 18; Rebs: Washburn 8 Asts: Lilov 3

Arena Stožice, Ljubljana
Attendance: 4,000
Referees: Spyridon Gontas (GRE), Andris Aunkrogers (LAT), Ivor Matějek (CZE)

17 September 2016
16:00

Boxscore

Ukraine	69–80	Slovenia
Scoring by quarter: 17–15, 19–27, 19–11, 14–27
Pts: Lukashov 14; Rebs: Fesenko, Lukashov 7 Asts: Lypovyy 4		Pts: G. Dragić 22; Rebs: Omić 9 Asts: Prepelič 6

Palace of Sports, Kyiv
Attendance: 6,000
Referees: Eddie Viator (FRA), Manuel Mazzoni (ITA), Georgios Poursanidis (GRE)

17 September 2016
20:00

Boxscore

Kosovo	62–67	Bulgaria
Scoring by quarter: 18–20, 10–22, 15–8, 19–17
Pts: Bamforth 21; Rebs: Veseli 9 Asts: Berisha 5		Pts: Washburn 14; Rebs: Velikov 7 Asts: Velikov 4

Salla e sporteve Minatori, Mitrovica
Attendance: 1,500
Referees: Ioannis Foufis (GRE), Jean-Charles Collin (FRA), Anne Panther (GER)

=== Group F ===
Pos	Team	Pld	W	L	PF	PA	PD	Pts	Qualification
1	Georgia	6	5	1	524	402	+122	11 (Note: Head-to-head results: Georgia 164–160 Montenegro)	EuroBasket 2017
2	Montenegro	6	5	1	563	420	+143	11	EuroBasket 2017
3	Slovakia	6	1	5	392	518	−126	7 (Note: Head-to-head results: Slovakia 134–132 Albania)	
4	Albania	6	1	5	372	511	−139	7	

Source: FIBA
Rules for classification: 1) Points; 2) Head-to-head results; 3) Points difference; 4) Points scored.
Notes:

31 August 2016
19:00

Boxscore

Georgia	86–47	Albania
Scoring by quarter: 21–9, 24–10, 23–13, 18–15
Pts: Sanikidze 20; Rebs: Pachulia 8 Asts: Tsintsadze 9		Pts: Hysenagolli 15; Rebs: Shima 7 Asts: three players 2

Sports Palace, Tbilisi
Attendance: 8,000
Referees: Christof Madinger (GER), Antonis Demetriou (CYP), Volodymyr Pediev (UKR)

31 August 2016
21:00

Boxscore

Montenegro	97–65	Slovakia
Scoring by quarter: 22–13, 28–15, 27–16, 20–21
Pts: Dašić 17; Rebs: Todorović 10; Asts: Mihailović 9		Pts: Baťka 14; Rebs: Baťka 8 Asts: three players 3

Morača Sports Center, Podgorica
Attendance: 4,000
Referees: Borys Ryzhyk (UKR), Benjamín Jiménez (ESP), Marek Maliszewski (POL)

3 September 2016
18:00

Boxscore

Slovakia	63–94	Georgia
Scoring by quarter: 21–30, 8–22, 17–20, 17–22
Pts: Žiak 14; Rebs: Tot 4 Asts: Baldovský, Krajčovič 3		Pts: Shengelia 18; Rebs: Shengelia 9 Asts: Dixon 7

Hant Arena, Bratislava
Attendance: 300
Referees: Saša Maricić (SRB), Milan Nedović (SLO), Konstatin Simonow (GER)

3 September 2016
19:00

Boxscore

Albania	73–113	Montenegro
Scoring by quarter: 15–33, 17–40, 18–21, 23–19
Pts: Broadus 26; Rebs: Hysenagolli 6 Asts: Broadus 4		Pts: Vučević 19; Rebs: Todorović 8 Asts: Needham 6

Asllan Rusi Sports Palace, Tirana
Attendance: 1,200
Referees: Petros Papapetrou (GRE), Alessandro Martolini (ITA), Semen Ovinov (RUS)

7 September 2016
18:00

Boxscore

Slovakia	69–60	Albania
Scoring by quarter: 14–11, 20–20, 25–17, 10–12
Pts: Korner 20; Rebs: Korner 10; Asts: Baldovský, Milošević 3		Pts: Broadus 23; Rebs: Shima 9 Asts: Shima 3

Mestská sportová hala, Prievidza
Attendance: 800
Referees: Anthonie Sinterniklaas (NED), Mykola Ambrosov (UKR), Josip Radojković (CRO)

7 September 2016
19:00

Boxscore

Georgia	74–76	Montenegro
Scoring by quarter: 25–19, 17–21, 12–22, 20–14
Pts: Pachulia 22; Rebs: Sanikidze 10; Asts: Tsintsadze 7		Pts: Vučević 17; Rebs: Vučević 11; Asts: Vučević 4

Sports Palace, Tbilisi
Attendance: 9,800
Referees: Robert Lottermoser (GER), Ingus Baumanis (LAT), Elias Koromilas (GRE)

10 September 2016
18:00

Boxscore

Slovakia	62–99	Montenegro
Scoring by quarter: 14–22, 17–25, 14–35, 17–17
Pts: Milošević 15; Rebs: Baťka 6 Asts: Tot 3		Pts: Vučević 17; Rebs: Dašić 9 Asts: four players 2

City Hall, Nitra
Attendance: 500
Referees: Marcin Kowalski (POL), Rain Peerandi (EST), Sérgio Silva (POR)

10 September 2016
19:00

Boxscore

Albania	64–84	Georgia
Scoring by quarter: 19–20, 17–16, 15–20, 13–28
Pts: Broadus 26; Rebs: Hysenagolli, Shima 8 Asts: Shima 2		Pts: Pachulia 20; Rebs: Shengelia 10; Asts: Pachulia 5

Asllan Rusi Sports Palace, Tirana
Attendance: 500
Referees: Antonio Conde (ESP), Pedro Coelho (POR), Matej Špendl (SLO)

14 September 2016
19:00

Boxscore

Georgia	96–68	Slovakia
Scoring by quarter: 30–19, 21–20, 20–16, 25–13
Pts: Shengelia 31; Rebs: Sanikidze 8 Asts: Tsintsadze 8		Pts: Milošević 21; Rebs: Baťka 7 Asts: Baťka 7

Sports Palace, Tbilisi
Attendance: 8,200
Referees: Anastasios Piloidis (GRE), Ilias Kounelles (CYP), Nikola Perlić (CRO)

14 September 2016
21:00

Boxscore

Montenegro	94–56	Albania
Scoring by quarter: 26–16, 20–11, 24–18, 24–11
Pts: Mihailović 13; Rebs: Dubljević 9 Asts: Needham, Vučević 5		Pts: Shima 24; Rebs: Hysenagolli 10; Asts: Lasku 5

Topolica Sport Hall, Bar, Montenegro
Attendance: 2,200
Referees: Carmelo Paternico (ITA), Martin Horozov (BUL), Bert van Slooten (NED)

17 September 2016
19:00

Boxscore

Albania	72–65	Slovakia
Scoring by quarter: 20–17, 10–14, 19–18, 14–16
Pts: Broadus 17; Rebs: Hysenagolli 8 Asts: Broadus 5		Pts: Milošević 18; Rebs: Baťka 10; Asts: Milošević 3

Asllan Rusi Sports Palace, Tirana
Attendance: 700
Referees: Sašo Petek (SLO), Tamás Benczur (HUN), Zoran Mitrovski (MKD)

17 September 2016
21:00

Boxscore

Montenegro	84–90	Georgia
Scoring by quarter: 18–26, 23–19, 21–19, 22–26
Pts: three players 17; Rebs: Vučević 8 Asts: Vučević 2		Pts: Dixon 31; Rebs: Pachulia 13; Asts: Tsintsadze 7

Topolica Sport Hall, Bar, Montenegro
Attendance: 2,000
Referees: Juan Carlos González (ESP), Joseph Bissang (FRA), Erşan Kartal (TUR)

=== Group G ===
Pos	Team	Pld	W	L	PF	PA	PD	Pts	Qualification
1	Hungary	6	6	0	480	413	+67	12	EuroBasket 2017
2	Great Britain	6	3	3	512	479	+33	9	EuroBasket 2017
3	Macedonia	6	2	4	439	473	−34	8	
4	Luxembourg	6	1	5	432	498	−66	7	

Source: FIBA
Rules for classification: 1) Points; 2) Head-to-head results; 3) Points difference; 4) Points scored.

31 August 2016
18:00

Boxscore

Hungary	96–77	Great Britain
Scoring by quarter: 25–22, 28–19, 21–21, 22–15
Pts: Hanga 32; Rebs: Hanga 7 Asts: Vojvoda, Wittmann 5		Pts: Clark, Lawrence 22; Rebs: Gordon, Young 5 Asts: Gordon 8

Messzi István Sportcsarnok, Kecskemét
Attendance: 1,800
Referees: Luís Lopes (POR), Janusz Calik (POL), Apostolos Kalpakas (SWE)

31 August 2016
20:30

Boxscore

Macedonia	89–75	Luxembourg
Scoring by quarter: 30–13, 18–15, 21–26, 20–21
Pts: Stojanovski 28; Rebs: Travis 9 Asts: Travis 6		Pts: Laurent 16; Rebs: three players 4 Asts: Melcher 4

Jasmin Sports Hall, Kavadarci
Attendance: 1,850
Referees: Sergei Beliakov (RUS), Ernad Karović (BIH), Ventsislav Velikov (BUL)

3 September 2016
18:30

Boxscore

Hungary	89–64	Luxembourg
Scoring by quarter: 32–15, 15–13, 27–17, 15–19
Pts: Vojvoda 17; Rebs: Perl 10; Asts: Perl, Vojvoda 6		Pts: Laurent 18; Rebs: Laurent 7 Asts: Melcher 4

Aréna Sopron, Sopron
Attendance: 1,500
Referees: Carlos Santos (POR), Alakbar Hasanov (AZE), Goran Šljivić (AUT)

3 September 2016
18:30

Boxscore

Great Britain	96–79	Macedonia
Scoring by quarter: 28–30, 22–13, 19–17, 27–19
Pts: Boateng 16; Rebs: Gordon 9 Asts: Okereafor 7		Pts: Stojanovski 28; Rebs: Magdevski 6 Asts: Kostoski, Travis 4

Copper Box, London
Attendance: 2,300
Referees: Vicente Bultó (ESP), Mehdi Diffalah (FRA), Paulo Marques (POR)

7 September 2016
19:00

Boxscore

Great Britain	95–72	Luxembourg
Scoring by quarter: 29–19, 14–22, 33–19, 19–12
Pts: Johnson 14; Rebs: Johnson 10; Asts: Okereafor 6		Pts: Laurent 30; Rebs: Laurent 6 Asts: Melcher 5

Copper Box, London
Attendance: 900
Referees: Ivan Miličević (BIH), Maciej Nazimek (IRL), Johannes Sarekoski (FIN)

7 September 2016
20:30

Boxscore

Macedonia	66–76	Hungary
Scoring by quarter: 17–15, 18–17, 13–16, 18–28
Pts: Stojanovski 16; Rebs: Travis 12; Asts: Kostoski, Travis 3		Pts: Vojvoda 27; Rebs: Hanga 7 Asts: Vojvoda 6

Jasmin Sports Hall, Kavadarci
Attendance: 2,000
Referees: Borys Ryzhyk (UKR), Alin Faur (ROU), Yener Yılmaz (TUR)

10 September 2016
18:30

Boxscore

Great Britain	80–88	Hungary
Scoring by quarter: 22–18, 22–20, 17–27, 19–23
Pts: Olaseni 17; Rebs: Olaseni 8 Asts: Young 7		Pts: three players 18; Rebs: Hanga 9 Asts: Hanga 8

Copper Box, London
Attendance: 2,000
Referees: Carlos Cortés (ESP), Nicolas Maestre (FRA), Anne Panther (GER)

10 September 2016
19:30

Boxscore

Luxembourg	74–82	Macedonia
Scoring by quarter: 13–21, 21–27, 31–16, 9–18
Pts: Laurent 25; Rebs: Picard, Schumacher 5 Asts: Birenbaum 4		Pts: Kostoski 20; Rebs: Kostoski 9 Asts: Kostoski 7

d'Coque, Luxembourg City
Attendance: 450
Referees: Bernard Vassallo (MLT), Joseph Bissang (FRA), Zdenko Tomašovič (SVK)

14 September 2016
19:00

Boxscore

Macedonia	62–89	Great Britain
Scoring by quarter: 14–21, 16–22, 23–23, 9–22
Pts: Nikolovski 17; Rebs: Mladenovic 8 Asts: Kostoski 5		Pts: Clark 21; Rebs: Boateng 9 Asts: Lawrence 5

Jasmin Sports Hall, Kavadarci
Attendance: 1,000
Referees: Daniel Hierrezuelo (ESP), Apostolos Kalpakas (SWE), Jurgis Laurinavičius (LTU)

14 September 2016
19:30

Boxscore

Luxembourg	65–68	Hungary
Scoring by quarter: 14–14, 24–21, 11–18, 16–15
Pts: Picard 15; Rebs: Laurent 7 Asts: Schumacher 4		Pts: Hanga 18; Rebs: Hanga, Keller 6 Asts: Hanga, Wittmann 2

d'Coque, Luxembourg City
Attendance: 480
Referees: Sigmundur Herbertsson (ISL), Bojan Jovanović (BIH), Dumitru Stasiev (MDA)

17 September 2016
16:30

Boxscore

Hungary	63–61	Macedonia
Scoring by quarter: 18–25, 14–12, 14–9, 17–15
Pts: Ferencz 18; Rebs: Keller 7 Asts: Wittmann 6		Pts: Kostoski 18; Rebs: Magdevski 6 Asts: Kostoski 7

Tiszaligeti Sportcsarnok, Szolnok
Attendance: 2,030
Referees: Damir Javor (SLO), Janusz Calik (POL), Arnis Ozols (LAT)

17 September 2016
19:30

Boxscore

Luxembourg	82–75	Great Britain
Scoring by quarter: 24–23, 13–22, 26–13, 19–17
Pts: Schumacher 20; Rebs: Laurent 11; Asts: Melcher 5		Pts: Lawrence 16; Rebs: Olaseni 15; Asts: Lawrence 5

d'Coque, Luxembourg City
Attendance: 1,100
Referees: Vladimir Tsekov (BUL), Fernando Calatrava (ESP), Yury Ihnatsyeu (BLR)

== Ranking of second-placed teams ==
Matches against the fourth-placed team in each group were not included in this ranking.

Pos	Grp	Team	Pld	W	L	PF	PA	PD	Pts	Qualification
1	F	Montenegro	4	3	1	356	291	+65	7	EuroBasket 2017
2	A	Iceland	4	3	1	298	274	+24	7	EuroBasket 2017
3	G	Great Britain	4	2	2	342	325	+17	6	EuroBasket 2017
4	E	Ukraine	4	2	2	297	300	−3	6	EuroBasket 2017
5	B	Netherlands	4	2	2	273	289	−16	6	
6	C	Bosnia and Herzegovina	4	2	2	273	308	−35	6	
7	D	Estonia	4	1	3	271	313	−42	5	

Source: FIBA
Rules for classification: 1) Points; 2) Points difference; 3) Points scored.

== Statistical leaders ==
=== Individual tournament highs ===
Points

Name	GP	PPG
(Albania) Rashaun Broadus	5	19.8
(Luxembourg) Alex Laurent	6	19.5
(Hungary) Ádám Hanga	5	19.4
(Portugal) João Gomes	6	19.3
(Bosnia and Herzegovina) Jusuf Nurkić	4	19.3

Rebounds

Name	GP	RPG
(Bosnia and Herzegovina) Jusuf Nurkić	4	14.7
(Portugal) João Gomes	6	10.0
(Iceland) Hlynur Bæringsson	6	8.2
(Georgia (country)) Tornike Shengelia	5	8.0
(Georgia (country)) Zaza Pachulia	6	7.7

Assists

Name	GP	APG
(Slovenia) Goran Dragić	5	8.4
(Georgia (country)) George Tsintsadze	6	6.8
(Sweden) Ludvig Håkanson	4	6.0
(Germany) Maodo Lô	6	5.8
(Ukraine) Oleksandr Lypovyy	6	5.3

Blocks

Name	GP	BPG
(Ukraine) Viacheslav Kravtsov	6	1.7
(Ukraine) Kyrylo Fesenko	6	1.5
(Russia) Timofey Mozgov	4	1.5
(Sweden) Nicholas Spires	4	1.5
(Ukraine) Vyacheslav Bobrov	6	1.2

Steals

Name	GP	SPG
(Belgium) Retin Obasohan	6	3.0
(Albania) Rashaun Broadus	5	2.8
(Estonia) Martin Dorbek	6	2.5
(Montenegro) Vladimir Dašić	6	2.5
(Georgia (country)) George Tsintsadze	6	2.2
(Bulgaria) Hristo Zahariev	6	2.2

Minutes

Name	GP	MPG
(Bulgaria) Sasha Vezenkov	4	36.2
(Kosovo) Dardan Berisha	6	36.0
(Albania) Rashaun Broadus	5	35.7
(Portugal) João Gomes	6	34.9
(Kosovo) Justin Doellman	5	34.4

=== Individual game highs ===
Statistic	Name	Total	Opponent
Points	(Hungary) Ádám Hanga (Estonia) Rain Veideman	32	Great Britain; Belarus
Total Rebounds	(Bosnia and Herzegovina) Jusuf Nurkić	16	Russia
Assists	(Slovenia) Goran Dragić	11	Ukraine
Blocks	(Ukraine) Kyrylo Fesenko	5	Slovenia
Steals	(Georgia (country)) George Tsintsadze	9	Slovakia
Field goal percentage	(United Kingdom) Gabriel Olaseni	100% (8/8)	Hungary
2-point field goal percentage	(Slovenia) Goran Dragić	100% (9/9)	Kosovo
3-point field goal percentage	(Georgia (country)) Michael Dixon (Hungary) János Eilingsfeld (Iceland) Logi Gunnarsson (Montenegro) Danilo Nikolić	100% (4/4)	Slovakia; Great Britain; Switzerland; Slovakia
Free throw percentage	(Montenegro) Bojan Dubljević	100% (12/12)	Georgia
Turnovers	(Slovenia) Goran Dragić (Georgia (country)) Zaza Pachulia (Slovenia) Goran Dragić (Poland) Adam Hrycaniuk	7	Bulgaria; Slovakia; Ukraine; Portugal
Minutes			

Statistic	Name	Total	Opponent
Field goals made	(Luxembourg) Alex Laurent	13	Great Britain
Field goals attempted	(Montenegro) Nikola Vučević	22	Georgia
2-point field goals made	(Germany) Danilo Barthel (Poland) Maciej Lampe (Luxembourg) Alex Laurent (Denmark) Jonas Bergstedt	10	Denmark; Belarus; Great Britain; Netherlands
2-point field goals attempted	(Montenegro) Nikola Vučević (Denmark) Jonas Bergstedt	17	Georgia; Netherlands
3-point field goals made	(Cyprus) Nikolaos Stylianou	8	Switzerland
3-point field goals attempted	(Bosnia and Herzegovina) Mirza Teletović	16	Russia
Free throws made	(Iceland) Haukur Pálsson (Montenegro) Bojan Dubljević	12	Belgium; Georgia
Free throws attempted	(Slovenia) Goran Dragić	15	Ukraine
Offensive Rebounds	(Slovenia) Gasper Vidmar (Portugal) João Gomes	7	Kosovo; Belarus
Defensive Rebounds	(Bosnia and Herzegovina) Jusuf Nurkić (Luxembourg) Alex Laurent (United Kingdom) Gabriel Olaseni	11	Russia; Great Britain; Luxembourg

=== Team tournament highs ===
Points

Team	GP	PPG
Montenegro	6	93.8
Slovenia	6	89.3
Georgia	6	87.3
Bulgaria	6	85.3
Germany	6	82.5

Rebounds

Team	GP	RPG
Bosnia and Herzegovina	4	49.3
Slovenia	6	42.2
Georgia	6	42.0
Ukraine	6	41.8
Belgium	6	41.7

Assists

Team	GP	APG
Slovenia	6	22.0
Georgia	6	20.7
Russia	4	20.5
Ukraine	6	20.0
Iceland	6	19.8

Blocks

Team	GP	BPG
Ukraine	6	5.3
Denmark	6	3.2
Germany	6	3.2
Cyprus	6	3.0
Switzerland	6	3.0
Russia	4	3.0

Steals

Team	GP	SPG
Montenegro	6	10.8
Bulgaria	6	9.8
Slovenia	6	9.5
Hungary	6	9.0
Belgium	6	8.8
Slovakia	6	8.8

=== Team game highs ===
Statistic	Team	Total	Opponent
Points	Montenegro; Slovenia	113	Albania; Kosovo
Total Rebounds	Ukraine	58	Kosovo
Assists	Germany	33	Denmark
Blocked Shots	Ukraine	8	Kosovo
Steals	Georgia	20	Slovakia
Field goal percentage	Montenegro	65.1% (41–63)	Albania
2-point field goal percentage	Montenegro	76.2% (32–42)	Albania
3-point field goal percentage	Russia	66.7% (12–18)	Sweden
Free throws percentage	Germany	100.0% (22-22)	Denmark
Turnovers	Slovakia	26	Montenegro

Statistic	Team	Total	Opponent
Field goal Made	Slovenia	45	Kosovo
Field goal Attempted	Germany	91	Denmark
2-point field goal Made	Slovenia	35	Kosovo
2-point field goal Attempted	Georgia; Slovenia	51	Slovakia; Kosovo
3-point field goal Made	Cyprus	16	Switzerland
3-point field goal Attempted	Sweden	44	Bosnia and Herzegovina
Free throws Made	Denmark	31	Germany
Free throws Attempted	Denmark; Georgia	38	Germany; Slovakia
Offensive Rebounds	Netherlands	22	Austria
Defensive Rebounds	Bosnia and Herzegovina; Ukraine	40	Sweden; Kosovo
