= Eurocup Basketball 2012–13 Regular Season Group C =

Standings and Results for Group C of the Regular Season phase of the 2012–13 Eurocup basketball tournament.

== Standings ==
All times are CET (UTC+1).

Key to colors
Top two teams advance to Last 16

	Team	Pld	W	L	PF	PA	Diff	Tie-break
1.	(Russia) BC Triumph Lyubertsy	6	6	0	505	473	+32	
2.	(Latvia) BC VEF Rīga	6	3	3	475	473	+2	
3.	(France) Le Mans Sarthe	6	2	4	454	429	+25	
4.	(Germany) Artland Dragons	6	1	5	444	503	–59	

=== Game 1 ===
7 November 2012
19:30

Report

Artland Dragons (Germany)	72–82	(Latvia) BC VEF Rīga
Scoring by quarter: 14–22, 18–15, 19–26, 21–19
Pts: King 16; Rebs: King 7 Asts: Valters 4		Pts: Kavaliauskas, Bertāns 18; Rebs: Zavackas 7 Asts: Janičenoks 5

Artland-Arena, Quakenbrück
Attendance: 1,321
Referees: Gianluca Mattioli (ITA), Francisco Araña (ESP), Tomislav Vovk (CRO)

7 November 2012
20:30

Report

Le Mans Sarthe (France)	71–76	(Russia) BC Triumph Lyubertsy
Scoring by quarter: 10–27, 11–13, 28–16, 22–20
Pts: El-Amin 19; Rebs: Kahudi 12; Asts: El-Amin 5		Pts: Karasev 27; Rebs: Landry 10; Asts: McKee 6

Antarès, Le Mans
Attendance: 4,400
Referees: Sasa Pukl (SLO), Carlos Cortes (ESP), Jasmina Juras (SRB)

=== Game 2 ===
13 November 2012
18:30

Report

BC VEF Rīga (Latvia)	80–89	(France) Le Mans Sarthe
Scoring by quarter: 22–22, 20–20, 20–24, 18–23
Pts: Bērziņš 23; Rebs: Bērziņš 8 Asts: Janičenoks 5		Pts: Batista 22; Rebs: Sy 6 Asts: El-Amin, Koffi, Sy 3

Arena Riga, Riga
Attendance: 3,000
Referees: Boris Shulga (UKR), Apostolos Kalpakas (SWE), Alexey Davydov (RUS)

14 November 2012
16:30

Report

BC Triumph Lyubertsy (Russia)	84–79 (OT)	(Germany) Artland Dragons
Scoring by quarter: 21–13, 17–21, 9–20, 25–18, Overtime: 12–7
Pts: McKee 22; Rebs: McKee 10; Asts: Naimy 4		Pts: Mallet, Popović 19; Rebs: Taylor 9 Asts: Four players 2

SH Triumph, Lyubertsy
Attendance: 1,300
Referees: Radomir Vojinovic (MNE), Jurgis Laurinavicius (LTU), Aleksandar Glisic (SRB)

=== Game 3 ===
21 November 2012
18:30

Report

BC VEF Rīga (Latvia)	84–91	(Russia) BC Triumph Lyubertsy
Scoring by quarter: 11–20, 23–28, 25–15, 25–28
Pts: Bertāns 23; Rebs: Rowland, Bērziņš 5 Asts: Rowland 4		Pts: McKee 32; Rebs: Landry 9 Asts: McKee 6

Arena Riga, Riga
Attendance: 2,500
Referees: Borys Ryzhyk (UKR), Tomas Jasevicius (LTU), Tomasz Trawicki (POL)

21 November 2012
18:30

Report

Artland Dragons (Germany)	76–71	(France) Le Mans Sarthe
Scoring by quarter: 16–17, 22–20, 17–18, 21–16
Pts: King 15; Rebs: Horner 10; Asts: Mallet 4		Pts: Batista 24; Rebs: Kahudi, Victor 5 Asts: El-Amin 6

Artland-Arena, Quakenbrück
Attendance: 1,344
Referees: Paolo Taurino (ITA), Sasa Maricic (SRB), Aare Halliko (EST)

=== Game 4 ===
28 November 2012
16:30

Report

BC Triumph Lyubertsy (Russia)	82–77	(Latvia) BC VEF Rīga
Scoring by quarter: 18–22, 23–12, 18–24, 23–19
Pts: Mitchell 21; Rebs: Mitchell, Landry 8 Asts: McKee 6		Pts: Rowland 17; Rebs: Janičenoks 6 Asts: Rowland 6

SH Triumph, Lyubertsy
Attendance: 300
Referees: Rustu Nuran (TUR), Sergiy Chebyshev (UKR), Haris Bijedic (BIH)

28 November 2012
20:30

Report

Le Mans Sarthe (France)	88–51	(Germany) Artland Dragons
Scoring by quarter: 24–17, 19–11, 22–15, 23–8
Pts: Long 15; Rebs: Batista 9 Asts: El-Amin 6		Pts: King 12; Rebs: King 5 Asts: Haynes 4

Antarès, Le Mans
Attendance: 4,300
Referees: Roberto Chiari (ITA), Lahdo Sharro (SWE), Tomasz Trawicki (POL)

=== Game 5 ===
4 December 2012
18:30

Report

BC VEF Rīga (Latvia)	83–72	(Germany) Artland Dragons
Scoring by quarter: 27–19, 16–15, 18–20, 22–18
Pts: Janičenoks 19; Rebs: Bērziņš, Zavackas 6 Asts: Rowland 6		Pts: Mallet 15; Rebs: Gomes 4 Asts: Haynes, Mallet, Taylor 3

Arena Riga, Riga
Attendance: 2,000
Referees: Miguel Perez Perez (ESP), Luis Lopes (POR), Sergiy Zashchuk (UKR)

5 December 2012
17:00

Report

BC Triumph Lyubertsy (Russia)	77–68	(France) Le Mans Sarthe
Scoring by quarter: 25–11, 18–17, 12–18, 22–22
Pts: McKee 18; Rebs: McKee 7 Asts: McKee 6		Pts: Batista 18; Rebs: Koffi 8 Asts: El-Amin, Victor, Kahudi 2

Antarès, Le Mans
Attendance: 1,500
Referees: Marek Cmikiewicz (POL), Marius Ciulin (ROM), Arnis Ozols (LAT)

=== Game 6 ===
12 December 2012
19:30

Report

Artland Dragons (Germany)	94–95 (OT)	(Russia) BC Triumph Lyubertsy
Scoring by quarter: 18–14, 17–24, 16–20, 32–25, Overtime: 11–12
Pts: Gomes 15; Rebs: Grünheid 8 Asts: Haynes, Hoffmann, Grünheid 3		Pts: Naimy 26; Rebs: Searcy 9 Asts: Naimy 6

Artland-Arena, Quakenbrück
Attendance: 1,361
Referees: Sinisa Herceg (CRO), Petar Obradovic (BIH), Gentian Cici (ALB)

12 December 2012
20:30

Report

Le Mans Sarthe (France)	67–69	(Latvia) BC VEF Rīga
Scoring by quarter: 17–17, 19–17, 14–13, 17–22
Pts: El-Amin 24; Rebs: Victor 6 Asts: El-Amin 8		Pts: Janičenoks 18; Rebs: Bērziņš 10; Asts: Rowland 6

Antarès, Le Mans
Attendance: 4,650
Referees: Fernando Rocha (POR), Carmelo Paternico (ITA), Miguel Angel Perez Niz (ESP)
