= Krisztián Wittmann =

Hungarian basketball player

No. 17 – Kecskeméti TE
- Position: Guard
- League: NB I/A; Champions League

Personal information
- Born: 22 May 1985 (age 41) Székesfehérvár, Hungary
- Listed height: 6 ft 1 in (1.85 m)
- Listed weight: 165 lb (75 kg)

Career information
- NBA draft: 2007: undrafted
- Playing career: 2003–present

Career history
- 2003–2006: Alba Fehérvár
- 2006–2009: PVSK Panthers
- 2009–2012: Kecskeméti KSE
- 2012–2014: Kecskeméti TE
- 2014–2017: Szolnoki Olaj
- 2017–present: Kecskeméti TE

Krisztián Wittmann (born 22 May 1985) is a Hungarian professional basketball player, currently with Kecskeméti TE of the Hungarian NB I/A league.

He represented the Hungarian national basketball team at the EuroBasket 2017 qualification, where he recorded most steals for his team. Wittmann was also on the roster that played at EuroBasket 2017.
