= Brian Savoy =

Argentine-born Swiss basketball player

No. 5 – Union Neuchâtel Basket
- Position: Point guard / shooting guard
- League: Championnat LNA

Personal information
- Born: January 13, 1992 (age 34) Baradero, Argentina
- Listed height: 6 ft 2 in (1.88 m)
- Listed weight: 189 lb (86 kg)

Career information
- High school: Fribourg Olympic
- Playing career: 2008–2019

Career history
- 2010–2011: Alcazar Menorca
- 2011–2012: CB Zamora
- 2012–2013: BBC Monthey
- 2013–2019: Union Neuchâtel Basket
- 2022-present: Eagles Neuchâtel, NBA

Brian Savoy (born January 13, 1992) is an Argentine-born Swiss professional basketball player. He currently plays for Union Neuchâtel Basket of Switzerland's Championnat LNA.

He represented Switzerland‘s national basketball team at the EuroBasket 2017 qualification, where he recorded most assists and steals for his team.
