= Mired Jani =

Albanian basketball player (born 1990)

Personal information
- Born: March 13, 1990 (age 36) Tirana, Albania
- Listed height: 6 ft 3 in (1.91 m)

Career information
- Playing career: 2006–2022
- Position: Point guard

Career history
- 2006–2016: Tirana

Mired Jani (born 13 March 1990) is an Albanian former professional basketball player who last played for Tirana in the Albanian Basketball Superliga as well as the Albania national team.
