= Alex Laurent =

Luxembourgish basketball player

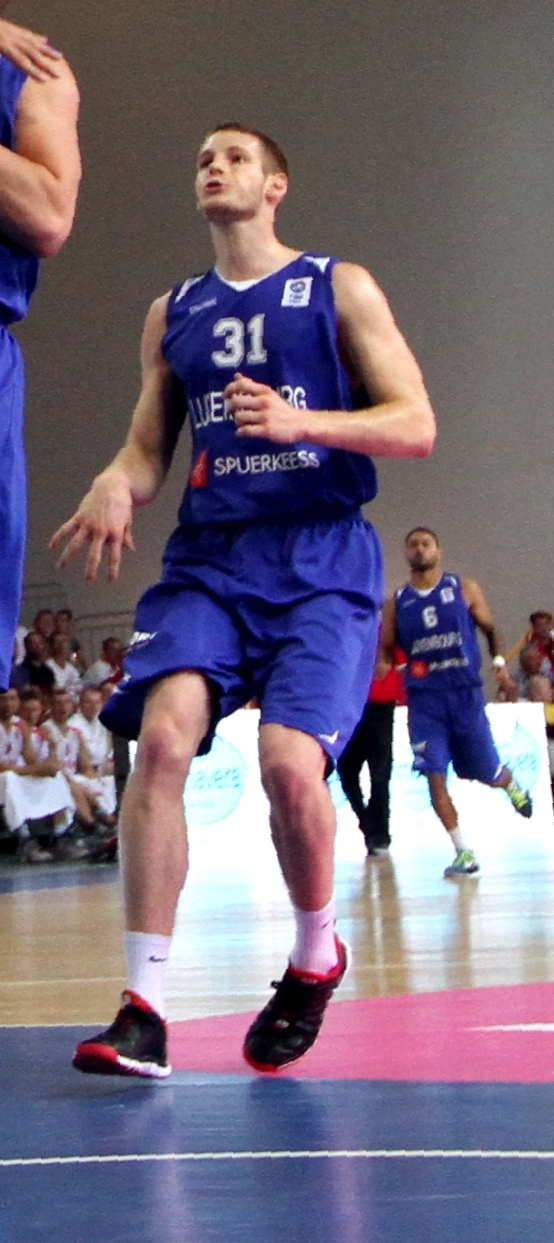
- Laurent with Luxembourg in 2014

Personal information
- Born: 6 June 1993 (age 33) Luxembourg, Luxembourg
- Listed height: 196 cm (6 ft 5 in)

Career information
- Playing career: 2012–present
- Position: Power forward
- Number: 22

Career history
- 2012–2017: Amicale Steinsel
- 2017–2019: Den Helder Suns
- 2019: Ciudad de Ponferrada
- 2019–2020: BSC Fürstenfeld Panthers
- 2020–2021: Klosterneuburg Dukes
- 2021–2022: Kortrijk Spurs
- 2022–2023: Gladiators Trier
- 2023–present: Amicale Steinsel

Career highlights
- 2x Luxembourgian League champion (2016–2017); Luxembourgian Cup champion (2017)

Alex Laurent (born 6 June 1993) is a Luxembourgish-German professional basketball player. He currently plays for BBC Amicale Steinsel. He is also a member of the Luxembourg national basketball team.

== Professional career ==
From 2012 until 2017, Laurent played for BBC Amicale Steinsel in the Luxembourgish first division Total League. Laurent's best season was the 2013–14 season, in which he averaged 11.4 points in 24.8 minutes per game. In his last two seasons with Amicale, he won the Luxembourgish national championship.

On 27 July 2017 Laurent signed with Den Helder Suns of the Dutch Basketball League (DBL). He averaged 11.3 points and 4.9 rebounds per game in his first year on the team. On 17 July 2018 Laurent re-signed with the squad. In July 2018, he re-signed for another season with Den Helder.

Laurent started the 2019-20 campaign with CB Ciudad de Ponferrada of the Spanish LEB Plata and then joined the BSC Fürstenfeld Panthers of Austria's top-flight during the season. He subsequently was signed by fellow Austrian side Klosterneuburg Dukes.

In the 2021–22 season, Laurent played for the Kortrijk Spurs in Belgium's second-tier league. He was granted German citizenship in 2022. Laurent's mother is of German descent.

On 12 June 2022 he signed with Gladiators Trier of the German ProA league. He parted company with the Trier side at the conclusion of the 2022-23 campaign.

On 3 October 2023, he returned to BBC Amicale Steinsel. In 2024, he captured the Luxembourg national championship title with Steinsel.
