= Fisnik Rugova =

Kosovan basketball player

No. 77 – Bora
- Position: Power forward
- League: Kosovo Basketball Superleague

Personal information
- Born: August 26, 1989 (age 37) Pristina, SFR Yugoslavia
- Listed height: 6 ft 10 in (2.08 m)
- Listed weight: 225 lb (102 kg)

Career history
- 2006–2014: Prishtina
- 2014–2016: Peja
- 2016–2021: Prishtina
- 2021–2022: Rahoveci
- 2022–2023: Bashkimi
- 2023–2025: Prishtina
- 2025–2026: Rahoveci
- 2026–present: Bora

Fisnik Rugova (born 26 August 1989) is a Kosovan professional basketball player for KB Bora of the Kosovo Basketball Superleague. Rugova also plays in the Kosovo national team.

== Professional career ==
In June 2016, Rugova signed a contract to return to Sigal Prishtina for a second stint. With Prishtina, he played in the FIBA Europe Cup during the 2016–17 season. He averaged 4 points per game over six group stage games.

== National team career ==
Rugova represents the Kosovo national basketball team. With Kosovo, he played during the EuroBasket 2017 qualifiers.
