= Alan Voskuil =

Danish-American basketball player (born 1986)

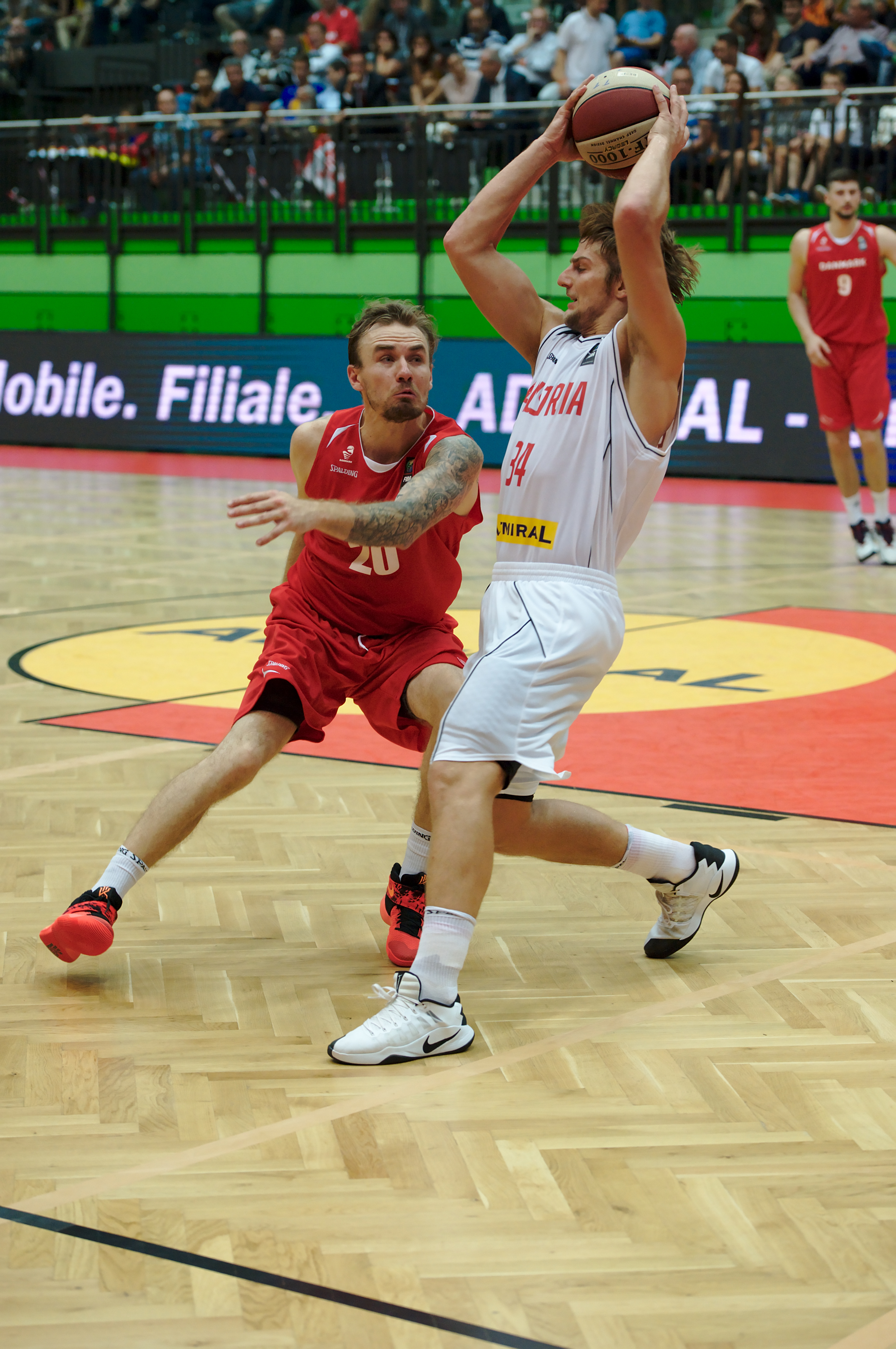
- Alan Voskuil and Moritz Lanegger

Retired
- Position: Shooting guard

Personal information
- Born: 10 September 1986 (age 40) Mobile, Alabama
- Listed height: 6 ft 3 in (1.91 m)
- Listed weight: 176 lb (80 kg)

Career information
- High school: L. D. Bell (Hurst, Texas)
- College: Texas Tech (2005–2009)
- NBA draft: 2009: undrafted
- Playing career: 2009–2020

Career history
- 2009: Fuenlabrada
- 2009–2010: →Óbila CB
- 2010–2011: Halifax Rainmen
- 2011: Bornova Belediye
- 2011–2012: U.C. Piacentina
- 2012: Chorale Roanne
- 2013: Olin Edirne
- 2013–2015: Bonprix Biella
- 2017: Viola Reggio Calabria
- 2017–18: Treviglio
- Stats at Basketball Reference

Alan Voskuil (born 10 September 1986) is a Danish-American retired professional basketball player.

From 2007 to 2019, Voskuil played for the Danish national basketball team.

== Professional career ==
On 22 August 2015, Voskuil signed with Virtus Roma of the Italian Serie A2, the second division.

In 2017–18, he played for Treviglio of the Italian Serie A2 Basket.
