= Genti Lasku =

Albanian basketball player

Personal information
- Born: March 24, 1985 (age 41) Albania
- Listed height: 6 ft 2.8 in (1.90 m)

Career information
- Playing career: 2002–2021

Career history
- 2002–2018: Tirana
- 2018–2019: Teuta Durrës
- 2019–2021: Partizani

Genti Lasku (born 24 March 1985) is an Albanian former professional basketball player who last played for Partizani Tirana in the Albanian Basketball Superliga as well as in the Albanian national team. He holds the record for the most points scored in a game in Albania, as he scored 100 points in a match between BC Tirana and Flamurtari on 16 April 2016.
