= David Ramseyer =

Swiss-French basketball player (born 1987)

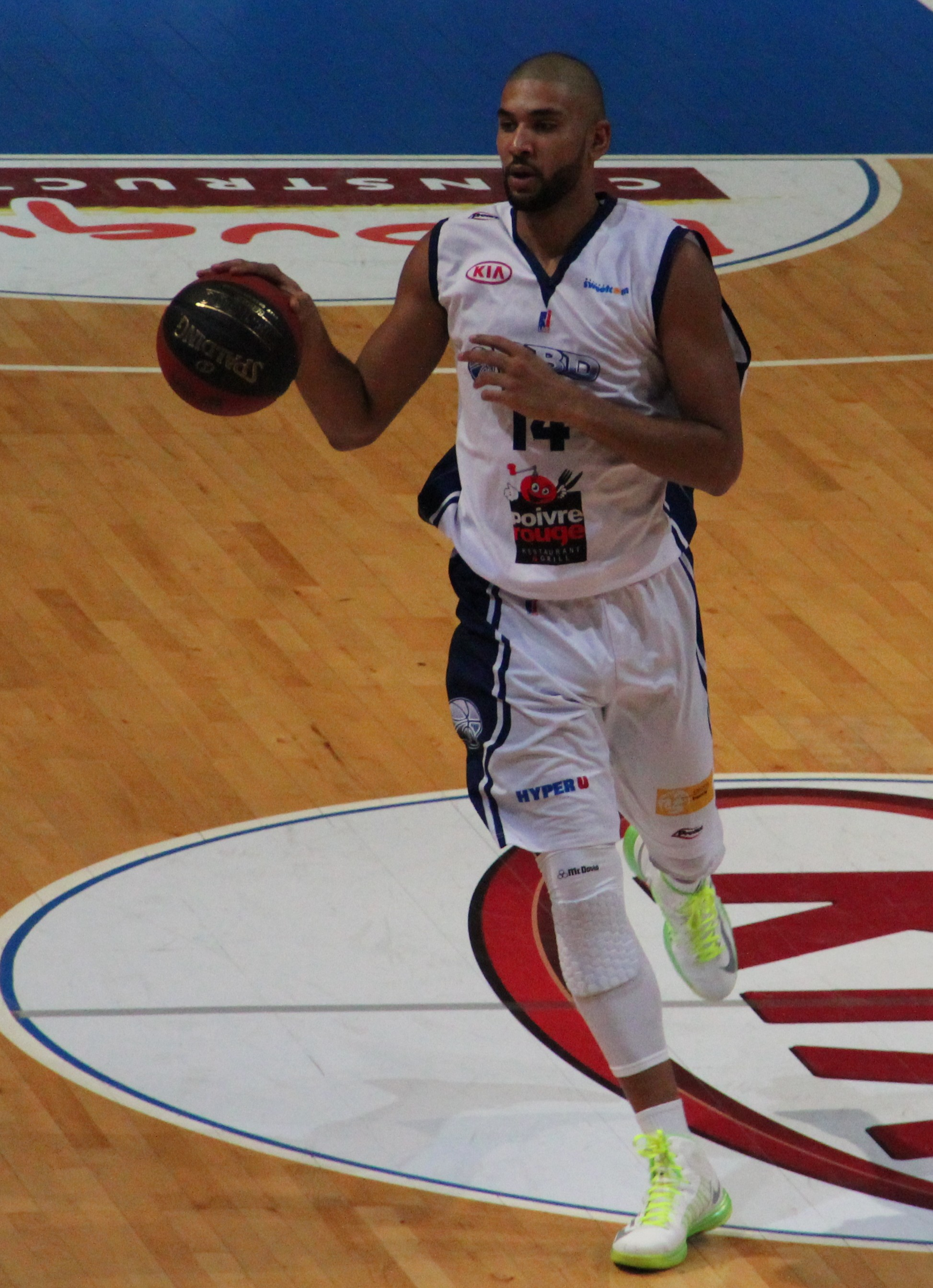
- Ramseyer playing for Boulazac in 2012

No. 17 – SVBD
- Position: Power forward
- League: Nationale Masculine 1

Personal information
- Born: 11 January 1987 (age 39) Geneva, Switzerland
- Listed height: 2.02 m (6 ft 8 in)

Career information
- NBA draft: 2009: undrafted
- Playing career: 2006–present

Career history
- 2006–2008: Genève Devils
- 2008–2009: Châlons-en-Champagne
- 2009–2010: Aix Maurienne Savoie Basket
- 2010–2011: Olympique Antibes
- 2011–2012: Hermine Nantes Basket
- 2012–2014: Boulazac Basket Dordogne
- 2014–2016: Lions de Genève
- 2017: Union Neuchâtel Basket
- 2017–2019: Caen Basket Calvados
- 2019–2023: Aix Maurienne Savoie Basket
- 2023–present: Saint-Vallier Basket Drôme

David Ramseyer (born 11 January 1987) is a Swiss-French basketball player for Saint-Vallier Basket Drôme of the Nationale Masculine 1.

== Professional career ==
In the past, he also played for the Lions de Genève.

From 2012 to 2014 he played for the French league Pro-A club Boulazac Basket Dordogne. In March 2017, he signed for Swiss top-tier team Union Neuchâtel Basket.

== International career ==
He has been a member of the Swiss national basketball team.
