= Anthony King (basketball) =

American-born Cypriot basketball player

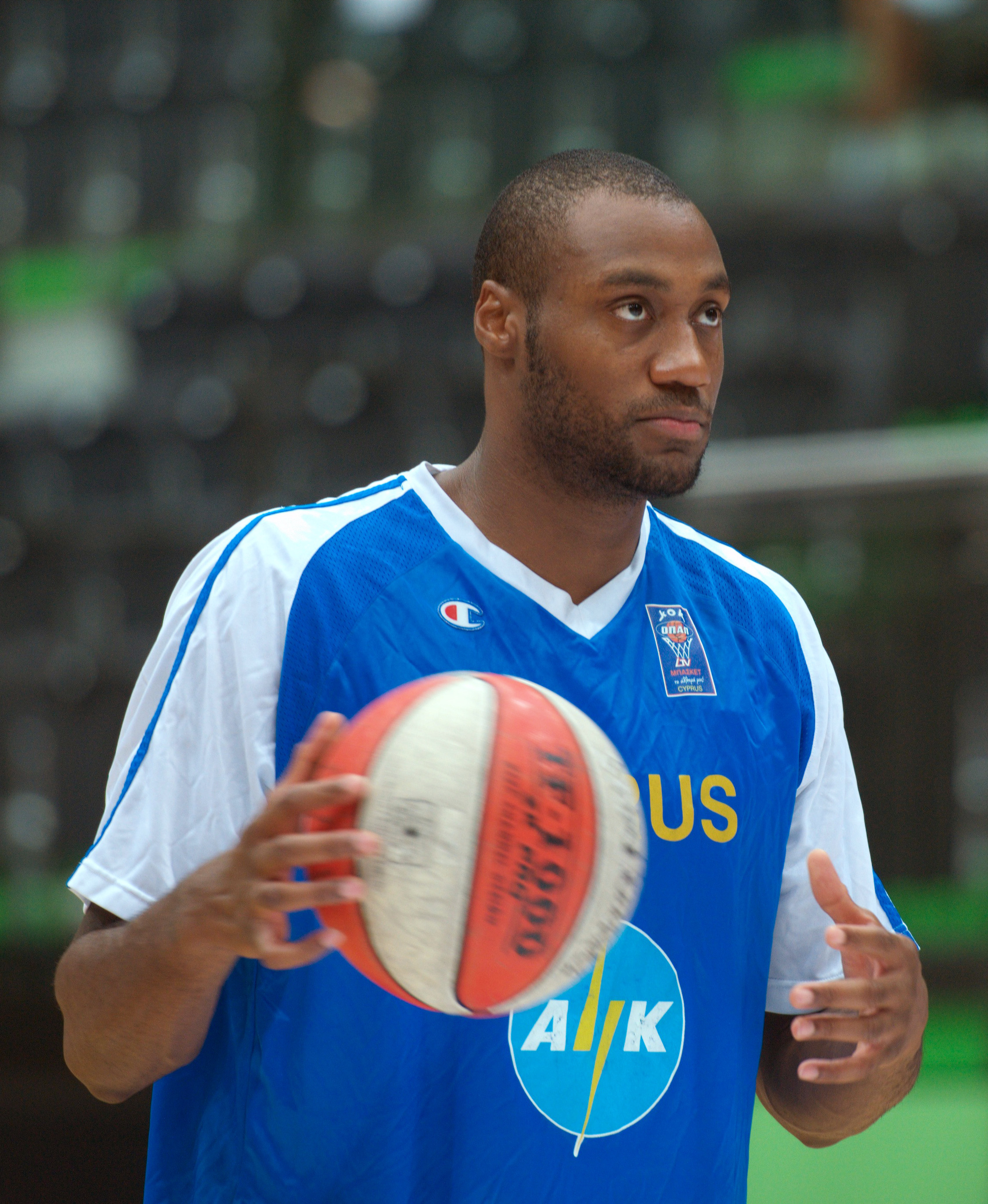
- King with the Cyprus national team in 2012

Personal information
- Born: 22 January 1985 (age 41) Dothan, Alabama, U.S.
- Listed height: 6 ft 9.5 in (2.07 m)
- Listed weight: 229 lb (104 kg)

Career information
- High school: Southern (Durham, North Carolina)
- College: Miami (Florida) (2003–2008)
- NBA draft: 2008: undrafted
- Playing career: 2008–present
- Position: Power forward / centre
- Number: 1

Career history
- 2008–2009: Skyliners Frankfurt
- 2009–2011: ETHA Engomis
- 2011: Aris Thessaloniki
- 2011–2015: Artland Dragons
- 2015–2016: Gaziantep
- 2016–2017: RheinStars Köln
- 2017–2021: Keravnos
- 2021–2022: Apollon Limassol

Career highlights
- Cypriot League champion (2019); Cypriot Cup winner (2019); Cypriot Super Cup winner (2019); Cypriot League blocks leader (2018); 2x Cypriot League All-Star (2017, 2018); ACC All-Defensive Team (2005)
Medals
Representing Cyprus
Men's basketball
Games of the Small States of Europe
Gold medal – first place	2017 San Marino	National Team

Anthony Lamar King (born 22 January 1985) is an American-born, naturalised Cypriot former professional basketball player who last played for Apollon Limassol of the Cypriot League. He played college basketball at Miami.

He represented Cyprus' national basketball team at the EuroBasket 2017 qualification, where he was his team's best rebounder and shot blocker.

== See also ==
- List of NCAA Division I men's basketball players with 13 or more blocks in a game
