= Maksym Korniyenko =

Ukrainian basketball player

No. 12 – Aguas de Calpe
- Position: Power forward
- League: Liga EBA

Personal information
- Born: 26 June 1987 (age 39) Dnipropetrovsk, Ukrainian SSR, Soviet Union
- Listed height: 6 ft 9 in (2.06 m)
- Listed weight: 232 lb (105 kg)

Career information
- NBA draft: 2009: undrafted

Career history
- 2005–2013: Dnipro
- 2013–2014: Donetsk
- 2014–2015: Khimik
- 2015–2016: Toruń
- 2016–2017: Lukoil Academic
- 2017–2018: Juventus Utena
- 2018–2019: BCM U Pitesti
- 2019–2021: Dnipro
- 2021–2022: Spartak
- 2022–present: Aguas de Calpe

Career highlights
- Ukrainian Super League champion (2020); Bulgarian League champion (2017); All-Polish League Team (2016)

Maksym Korniyenko (born 26 June 1987) is a Ukrainian basketball player for Aguas de Calpe. He plays for the Ukrainian national team, where he participated at the 2014 FIBA Basketball World Cup.
