= Mário Gil Fernandes =

Portuguese basketball player (born 1982)

Mário Gil Andrade Fernandes (born 25 April 1982) is a Portuguese basketball player who has most notably played for Benfica, having also represented his local club CAB Madeira, AAC Coimbra, Swedish side Jämtland Basket, Spanish sides Balneario de Archena and CB Plasencia, and Ovarense. He measures 1.74 meters and plays as a point guard.

== Honours ==
Benfica

- Portuguese League: 2013–14, 2014–15, 2016–17
- Portuguese Cup: 2013–14, 2014–15, 2015–16, 2016–17
- League Cup / Hugo dos Santos Cup: 2013–14, 2014–15, 2016–17
- António Pratas Trophy: 2014, 2015
- Portuguese Super Cup: 2013, 2014, 2015
