= EuroBasket 2029 qualification =

International basketball event

Tournament details
- Dates: 27 November 2025 – February 2029
- Teams: 42 (expected)

Official website
- Qualifiers website Pre-qualifiers website

The EuroBasket 2029 qualification is a basketball competition that began in November 2025 and will conclude in February 2029, to determine the 20 FIBA Europe member nations who will join the automatically qualified co-hosts Estonia, Greece, Slovenia and Spain at the EuroBasket 2029 finals tournament.

== Pre-Qualifiers ==
The EuroBasket 2029 Pre-Qualifiers will be played over three rounds. The best eight teams advance to the EuroBasket 2029 Qualifiers.

=== First round ===
The pre-qualifiers first round was played by the ten teams that were eliminated from the 2027 FIBA World Cup Pre-Qualifiers. The winner of each group, and the best runner-up team qualified for the second round.

==== Draw ====
The draw was made on 8 September 2025.

===== Seeding =====
The seeding was based on the FIBA World Rankings of 25 February 2025.

Seed 1
Team	Pos
Bulgaria	46
North Macedonia	58
Slovakia	60

Seed 2
Team	Pos
Kosovo	76
Norway	77
Ireland	82

Seed 3
Team	Pos
Luxembourg	86
Armenia	92
Albania	95

Seed 4
Team	Pos
Azerbaijan	113

==== Groups ====
All times are local.

===== Group A =====
Pos	Team	Pld	W	L	PF	PA	PD	Pts	Qualification
1	North Macedonia	6	6	0	489	387	+102	12	Second round
2	Luxembourg	6	2	4	479	493	−14	8 (Note: Luxembourg 6 Pts, +9 PD; Ireland 6 Pts, −2 PD; Azerbaijan 6 Pts, −8 PD.)	Third round
3	Ireland	6	2	4	451	485	−34	8	Third round
4	Azerbaijan	6	2	4	431	485	−54	8	Third round

Source: FIBA
Rules for classification: 1) Points; 2) Head-to-head; 3) Points difference; 4) Points scored.
Notes:

27 November 2025	North Macedonia	87–49	Azerbaijan	Skopje
19:00	Scoring by quarter: 22–13, 18–8, 23–16, 24–12
	Pts: Jakimovski 25; Rebs: Jakimovski, Stojanovski 11; Asts: Moore 9	Boxscore	Pts: Hamzayev 12; Rebs: S. Donat 13; Asts: K. Mammadov 5	Arena: SRC Kale; Attendance: 800; Referees: Łukasz Jankowski (POL), Polat Parlak (TUR), Sava Ćetković (MNE)

27 November 2025	Luxembourg	89–77	Ireland	Luxembourg City
19:30	Scoring by quarter: 26–11, 21–26, 17–24, 25–16
	Pts: Kovac 38; Rebs: Logelin, Rugg 6 Asts: Gutenkauf 6	Boxscore	Pts: Badmus 24; Rebs: Buivydas 10; Asts: Flood 6	Arena: d'Coque; Attendance: 1,200; Referees: Mehmet Karabilecen (TUR), Diogo Martins (POR), Karol Kowalski (POL)

30 November 2025	Azerbaijan	90–95	Luxembourg	Baku
18:00	Scoring by quarter: 18–25, 26–32, 17–25, 29–13
	Pts: Van Beck 29; Rebs: Van Beck 8 Asts: Van Beck 7	Boxscore	Pts: Kovac 29; Rebs: Kovac 9 Asts: Kovac 5	Arena: Baku Sports Palace; Attendance: 1,235; Referees: Nemanja Ninković (SRB), Ciprian Stoica (ROU), Aleksandar Radonjić (AUT)

30 November 2025	Ireland	76–88	North Macedonia	Dublin
17:00	Scoring by quarter: 27–20, 13–22, 22–19, 14–27
	Pts: Alajiki 26; Rebs: Alajiki 10; Asts: Badmus 3	Boxscore	Pts: Jakimovski 26; Rebs: Wiley 9 Asts: Jakimovski, Mekić 4	Arena: National Basketball Arena; Attendance: 2,000; Referees: Marek Mikulčík (SVK), Martin Van Hoye (BEL), Jānis Rozenbergs (LAT)

27 February 2026	North Macedonia	79–70	Luxembourg	Skopje
18:00	Scoring by quarter: 25–17, 19–15, 15–17, 20–21
	Pts: Jakimovski 17; Rebs: Happ 14; Asts: Petkov 7	Boxscore	Pts: Kovac 20; Rebs: Kovac 11; Asts: Gutenkauf 4	Arena: City Park Sports Hall; Attendance: 1,500; Referees: Peter Ženiš (SVK), Duhan Köyiçi (TUR), Mladen Lučić (MNE)

27 February 2026	Ireland	75–76	Azerbaijan	Dublin
19:30	Scoring by quarter: 19–18, 16–23, 19–18, 21–17
	Pts: Flood 18; Rebs: N. Quinn 12; Asts: Fulton 11	Boxscore	Pts: Van Beck 20; Rebs: S. Donat, Van Beck 6 Asts: K. Mammadov 8	Arena: National Basketball Arena; Attendance: 2,000; Referees: Jan Baloun (CZE), Iain MacDonald (GBR), Nikola Bejat (NOR)

2 March 2026	Ireland	91–85	Luxembourg	Dublin
19:30	Scoring by quarter: 22–23, 17–12, 26–21, 26–29
	Pts: N. Quinn 22; Rebs: N. Quinn 14; Asts: Fulton 12	Boxscore	Pts: Rugg 23; Rebs: Rugg 11; Asts: Gutenkauf 6	Arena: National Basketball Arena; Attendance: 2,000; Referees: Viktor Nagy (HUN), Pierre Landy (FRA), José Pedroso (POR)

2 March 2026	Azerbaijan	70–78	North Macedonia	Baku
20:00	Scoring by quarter: 28–19, 16–18, 12–21, 14–20
	Pts: Van Beck 23; Rebs: S. Donat 8 Asts: K. Mammadov 4	Boxscore	Pts: Jakimovski 22; Rebs: Happ 9 Asts: Magdevski 7	Arena: Baku Sports Palace; Attendance: 1,300; Referees: Kirile Tvauri (GEO), Tomasz Łangowski (POL), Emmanouil Tsolakos (GRE)

2 July 2026	North Macedonia	77–56	Ireland	Skopje
18:00	Scoring by quarter: 23–16, 15–11, 21–10, 18–19
	Pts: Jakimovski 19; Rebs: Jakimovski 13; Asts: Tashovski 5	Boxscore	Pts: Alajiki 20; Rebs: Alajiki 11; Asts: Flood 9	Arena: Lazar Lečić Sports Hall; Attendance: 500; Referees: Ali Şakacı (TUR), Alessandro Perciavalle (ITA), Gabrielius Simonavičius (LTU)

2 July 2026	Luxembourg	74–76	Azerbaijan	Luxembourg City
19:00	Scoring by quarter: 18–22, 24–17, 13–18, 19–19
	Pts: Kovac 15; Rebs: Kovac 8 Asts: Kovac 4	Boxscore	Pts: K. Mammadov 19; Rebs: Aydın 12; Asts: K. Mammadov 3	Arena: d'Coque; Attendance: 1,200; Referees: Jan Baloun (CZE), Nemanja Vlahović (SRB), Jules Gaduel (FRA)

5 July 2026	Luxembourg	66–80	North Macedonia	Luxembourg City
16:00	Scoring by quarter: 15–23, 12–23, 22–17, 17–17
	Pts: Kovac 17; Rebs: Grosber 9 Asts: Gutenkauf, Kovac 4	Boxscore	Pts: Sestina 18; Rebs: Gjuroski, Tashovski 7 Asts: Tashovski 7	Arena: d'Coque; Attendance: 2,000; Referees: Peter Ženiš (SVK), Diogo Martins (POR), Matteo Lucotti (ITA)

5 July 2026	Azerbaijan	70–76	Ireland	Baku
17:00	Scoring by quarter: 23–12, 12–19, 20–22, 15–23
	Pts: Van Beck 21; Rebs: Aydın 14; Asts: Aydın 6	Boxscore	Pts: Flood 25; Rebs: Alajiki 13; Asts: Alajiki, Flood 4	Arena: Baku Sports Palace; Attendance: 1,500; Referees: Mehmet Karabilecen (TUR), Vlad-Theodor Cotrobas-Dascalu (ROU), Sava Ćetković (MNE)

===== Group B =====
Pos	Team	Pld	W	L	PF	PA	PD	Pts	Qualification
1	Bulgaria	4	3	1	353	301	+52	7 (Note: Bulgaria 155–134 Norway)	Second round
2	Norway	4	3	1	323	320	+3	7	Second round
3	Armenia	4	0	4	333	388	−55	4	Third round

Source: FIBA
Rules for classification: 1) Points; 2) Head-to-head; 3) Points difference; 4) Points scored.
Notes:

27 November 2025	Bulgaria	98–88	Armenia	Botevgrad
19:15	Scoring by quarter: 25–21, 26–20, 27–26, 20–21
	Pts: Stoimenov 21; Rebs: Minchev 11; Asts: Bost 9	Boxscore	Pts: Spight 37; Rebs: Melikyan 12; Asts: Vital 3	Arena: Arena Botevgrad; Attendance: 1,900; Referees: Branimir Galić (CRO), Tomasz Łangowski (POL), Luka Manojlović (SRB)

30 November 2025	Armenia	62–74	Norway	Yerevan
19:00	Scoring by quarter: 18–17, 13–18, 20–14, 11–25
	Pts: Spight 30; Rebs: Melikyan 18; Asts: three players 2	Boxscore	Pts: Frey 21; Rebs: Frey, Rotegård 6 Asts: Frey 8	Arena: Mika Sports Arena; Attendance: 850; Referees: Peter Ženiš (SVK), Alin Faur (ROU), Jan Baloun (CZE)

27 February 2026	Norway	76–67	Bulgaria	Honefoss
20:00	Scoring by quarter: 29–16, 17–17, 16–14, 14–20
	Pts: Ndow 27; Rebs: Ndow 8 Asts: Espe, Frey 7	Boxscore	Pts: Dimitrov 12; Rebs: Minchev 13; Asts: P. Ivanov, Stoimenov 3	Arena: Honefoss Arena; Attendance: 1,500; Referees: Łukasz Jankowski (POL), Armin Mutapcic (GER), Jānis Rozenbergs (LAT)

2 March 2026	Armenia	80–100	Bulgaria	Yerevan
20:15	Scoring by quarter: 17–22, 18–17, 21–21, 24–40
	Pts: McGhee 35; Rebs: Melikyan, Tatevosyan 8 Asts: McGhee 7	Boxscore	Pts: P. Ivanov 24; Rebs: Minchev 9 Asts: Toshkov 12	Arena: Mika Sports Arena; Attendance: 1,300; Referees: Ciprian Stoica (ROU), Nemanja Vlahović (SRB), Gabrielius Simonavičius (LTU)

2 July 2026	Norway	116–103	Armenia	Honefoss
19:00	Scoring by quarter: 32–20, 31–27, 30–29, 23–27
	Pts: Frey 35; Rebs: Ndow 6 Asts: Frey 7	Boxscore	Pts: Jessup, Spight 25; Rebs: Melikyan 8 Asts: Kirakosyan 7	Arena: Honefoss Arena; Attendance: 1,000; Referees: Viktor Nagy (HUN), Emmanouil Tsolakos (GRE), Joona Haaja (FIN)

5 July 2026	Bulgaria	88–57	Norway	Botevgrad
19:30	Scoring by quarter: 27–10, 25–17, 22–12, 14–18
	Pts: Vezenkov 22; Rebs: A. Ivanov 8 Asts: K. Toshkov 8	Boxscore	Pts: Bergsneg 10; Rebs: Savic 8 Asts: Espe 4	Arena: Arena Botevgrad; Attendance: 3,500; Referees: Zoran Mitrovski (MKD), Jan Baloun (CZE), Oleksandr Oparin (UKR)

===== Group C =====
Pos	Team	Pld	W	L	PF	PA	PD	Pts	Qualification
1	Slovakia	4	4	0	342	292	+50	8	Second round
2	Kosovo	4	1	3	342	348	−6	5 (Note: Kosovo 181–173 Albania)	Third round
3	Albania	4	1	3	304	348	−44	5	Third round

Source: FIBA
Rules for classification: 1) Points; 2) Head-to-head; 3) Points difference; 4) Points scored.
Notes:

27 November 2025	Slovakia	73–63	Albania	Prievidza
18:00	Scoring by quarter: 19–23, 22–12, 16–17, 16–11
	Pts: Kováčik 13; Rebs: Golian 8 Asts: Ihring 5	Boxscore	Pts: Tola 16; Rebs: Hamati 10; Asts: Dusha, Hysa 3	Arena: ŠH Prievidza; Attendance: 1,764; Referees: Zoran Mitrovski (MKD), Viktor Nagy (HUN), Nermin Hodžić (BIH)

30 November 2025	Albania	84–99	Kosovo	Shkodër
18:00	Scoring by quarter: 14–25, 14–19, 32–30, 24–25
	Pts: Hamati 19; Rebs: Hamati 10; Asts: Hysa 9	Boxscore	Pts: Berisha 35; Rebs: Kapiti 8 Asts: Armstead 7	Arena: Qazim Dervishi Sports Palace; Attendance: 200; Referees: Mladen Lučić (MNE), Alessandro Perciavalle (ITA), Primož Pipan (SLO)

27 February 2026	Kosovo	78–89	Slovakia	Prizren
19:00	Scoring by quarter: 27–18, 15–30, 24–26, 12–15
	Pts: Myles 21; Rebs: Shoshi 6 Asts: Myles 5	Boxscore	Pts: DeJulius 26; Rebs: Golian 18; Asts: DeJulius 8	Arena: Sezai Surroi Sports Hall; Attendance: 700; Referees: Ali Şakacı (TUR), Alija Ferevski (MKD), Alin Faur (ROU)

2 March 2026	Albania	68–94	Slovakia	Shkodër
18:00	Scoring by quarter: 15–17, 20–30, 22–17, 11–30
	Pts: Taflaj, Tola 16; Rebs: Krypci 8 Asts: Tola 4	Boxscore	Pts: DeJulius 26; Rebs: Pavelka 10; Asts: S. Krajčovič 7	Arena: Qazim Dervishi Sports Palace; Attendance: 300; Referees: Mehmet Karabilecen (TUR), Sava Ćetković (MNE), Goran Grbić (SLO)

2 July 2026	Kosovo	82–89	Albania	Prizren
19:00	Scoring by quarter: 23–23, 25–24, 17–22, 17–20
	Pts: Berisha 28; Rebs: Hajrizi 15; Asts: Myles 4	Boxscore	Pts: Tyree 25; Rebs: Gaxho 9 Asts: Tyree 8	Arena: Sezai Surroi Sports Hall; Attendance: 700; Referees: Ciprian Stoica (ROU), Pierre Landy (FRA), Diogo Martins (POR)

5 July 2026	Slovakia	86–83	Kosovo	Spišská Nová Ves
18:00	Scoring by quarter: 33–22, 17–20, 20–21, 16–20
	Pts: Hronský 20; Rebs: Brodziansky 11; Asts: Hlivák 8	Boxscore	Pts: Hajrizi 20; Rebs: Shoshi 13; Asts: Hajrizi, Myles 4	Arena: Spiš Aréna; Attendance: 3,509; Referees: Viktor Nagy (HUN), Gabrielius Simonavičius (LTU), Martin Van Hoye (BEL)

===== Ranking of second-placed teams =====
Matches against the fourth-placed team in Group A are not included in this ranking.

Pos	Grp	Team	Pld	W	L	PF	PA	PD	Pts	Qualification
1	B	Norway	4	3	1	323	320	+3	7	Second round
2	C	Kosovo	4	1	3	342	348	−6	5	Third round
3	A	Luxembourg	4	1	3	310	327	−17	5	Third round

Source: FIBA
Rules for classification: 1) Points; 2) Points difference; 3) Points scored.

=== Second round ===
The pre-qualifiers second round is being played in three windows: August 2026, November 2026 and February 2027.

The twelve teams were drawn into four groups of three teams. The winner of each group advances to the Qualifiers. All other teams will be transferred to the third round.

==== Teams ====
Entrance/qualification method	Team(s)
Advanced from First round	Bulgaria; North Macedonia; Norway; Slovakia
Eliminated from 2027 World Cup qualification first round	Austria; Belgium; Cyprus; Czechia; Denmark; Great Britain; Romania; Switzerland

==== Draw ====
The draw took place on 16 July 2026 in Munich, Germany.

==== Groups ====
All times are local.

===== Group D =====
Pos	Team	Pld	W	L	PF	PA	PD	Pts	Qualification
1	Romania	2	1	1	175	181	−6	3	Qualifiers
2	Bulgaria	1	1	0	103	86	+17	2	Third round
3	Denmark	1	0	1	78	89	−11	1	Third round

Updated to match(es) played on 30 August 2026. Source: FIBA
Rules for classification: 1) Points; 2) Head-to-head; 3) Points difference; 4) Points scored.

27 August 2026	Denmark	78–89	Romania	Farum
18:30	Scoring by quarter: 10–22, 23–16, 20–27, 25–24
	Pts: Dibba 21; Rebs: Dibba, Pedersen 7 Asts: Lundberg 6	Boxscore	Pts: Russell 34; Rebs: Cățe 8 Asts: Diculescu, Russell 6	Arena: Farum Arena; Attendance: 1,375; Referees: Valerio Grigioni (ITA), Tomasz Łangowski (POL), Pierre Landy (FRA)

30 August 2026	Romania	86–103	Bulgaria	Tulcea
18:00	Scoring by quarter: 32–34, 16–23, 18–20, 20–26
	Pts: Russell 22; Rebs: Cate 8 Asts: Russell 6	Boxscore	Pts: Vezenkov 36; Rebs: Mladenov 11; Asts: Gibson 9	Arena: Sala Polivalentă 1 Attendance: 4,603; Referees: Zafer Yılmaz (TUR), Ilias Kounelles (CYP), Rainis Värv (EST)

26 November 2026	Bulgaria	vs.	Denmark	Sofia
19:00
		Boxscore		Arena: Arena Sofia

29 November 2026	Romania	vs.	Denmark	Timișoara
18:00
		Boxscore		Arena: Constantin Jude Sports Hall

25 February 2027	Bulgaria	vs.	Romania
		Boxscore

28 February 2027	Denmark	vs.	Bulgaria
		Boxscore

===== Group E =====
Pos	Team	Pld	W	L	PF	PA	PD	Pts	Qualification
1	Great Britain	2	2	0	207	147	+60	4	Qualifiers
2	Slovakia	1	0	1	72	97	−25	1	Third round
3	Switzerland	1	0	1	75	110	−35	1	Third round

Updated to match(es) played on 30 August 2026. Source: FIBA
Rules for classification: 1) Points; 2) Head-to-head; 3) Points difference; 4) Points scored.

27 August 2026	Switzerland	75–110	Great Britain	Fribourg
19:00	Scoring by quarter: 19–25, 19–25, 13–29, 24–31
	Pts: Schumacher 20; Rebs: N. Ročak 7 Asts: Schumacher 3	Boxscore	Pts: Uduje 24; Rebs: three players 7 Asts: Watson-Gayle 8	Arena: Salle Saint-Léonard; Attendance: 1,020; Referees: Ivor Matějek (CZE), Łukasz Jankowski (POL), Rainis Värv (EST)

30 August 2026	Great Britain	97–72	Slovakia	Newcastle upon Tyne
17:00	Scoring by quarter: 29–22, 19–16, 24–17, 25–17
	Pts: Uduje 14; Rebs: Williams 9 Asts: Williams 6	Boxscore	Pts: Brodziansky 23; Rebs: Brodziansky 14; Asts: Kováčik 4	Arena: Vertu Arena; Attendance: 2,381; Referees: Marius Ciulin (ROU), Valerio Grigioni (ITA), Nermin Hodzic (GER)

26 November 2026	Slovakia	vs.	Switzerland	Bratislava
18:00
		Boxscore		Arena: Gopass Arena

29 November 2026	Great Britain	vs.	Switzerland	Newcastle upon Tyne
15:00
		Boxscore		Arena: Vertu Arena

25 February 2027	Slovakia	vs.	Great Britain
		Boxscore

28 February 2027	Switzerland	vs.	Slovakia
		Boxscore

===== Group F =====
Pos	Team	Pld	W	L	PF	PA	PD	Pts	Qualification
1	North Macedonia	1	1	0	91	59	+32	2	Qualifiers
2	Cyprus	1	1	0	77	72	+5	2	Third round
3	Austria	2	0	2	131	168	−37	2	Third round

Updated to match(es) played on 30 August 2026. Source: FIBA
Rules for classification: 1) Points; 2) Head-to-head; 3) Points difference; 4) Points scored.

27 August 2026	Cyprus	77–72	Austria	Limassol
19:00	Scoring by quarter: 16–20, 20–21, 20–14, 21–17
	Pts: F. Tigkas 25; Rebs: Pasialis 10; Asts: Michail 8	Boxscore	Pts: Mbemba 19; Rebs: Mbemba 10; Asts: Friedrich 4	Arena: Spyros Kyprianou Arena; Attendance: 1,000; Referees: Marius Ciulin (ROU), Branimir Galić (CRO), Nemanja Ninković (SRB)

30 August 2026	Austria	59–91	North Macedonia	Vienna
16:05	Scoring by quarter: 14–30, 16–19, 14–16, 15–26
	Pts: three players 9 Rebs: Dietz, Kapic 7 Asts: Vujošević 7	Boxscore	Pts: Efremovski 17; Rebs: Dimitrijević 14; Asts: Dimitrijević 11	Arena: Sport Arena Wien; Attendance: 1,100; Referees: Ilias Karpanos (GRE), Łukasz Jankowski (POL), Viktor Nagy (HUN)

26 November 2026	North Macedonia	vs.	Cyprus	Skopje
18:00
		Boxscore		Arena: Lazar Lečić Sports Hall

29 November 2026	Austria	vs.	Cyprus	Vienna
18:00
		Boxscore		Arena: Sport Arena Wien

25 February 2027	North Macedonia	vs.	Austria
		Boxscore

28 February 2027	Cyprus	vs.	North Macedonia
		Boxscore

===== Group G =====
Pos	Team	Pld	W	L	PF	PA	PD	Pts	Qualification
1	Czechia	2	1	1	189	189	0	3	Qualifiers
2	Belgium	1	1	0	92	81	+11	2	Third round
3	Norway	1	0	1	97	108	−11	1	Third round

Updated to match(es) played on 30 August 2026. Source: FIBA
Rules for classification: 1) Points; 2) Head-to-head; 3) Points difference; 4) Points scored.

27 August 2026	Belgium	92–81	Czechia	Ostend
20:30	Scoring by quarter: 24–13, 21–20, 25–19, 22–29
	Pts: Kesteloot 22; Rebs: Guisse 9 Asts: Van Den Eynde 11	Boxscore	Pts: Bálint 20; Rebs: Zídek 6 Asts: Sehnal 7	Arena: COREtec Dôme; Attendance: 644; Referees: Dariusz Zapolski (POL), Ilias Karpanos (GRE), Jānis Rozenbergs (LAT)

30 August 2026	Czechia	108–97(OT)	Norway	Prague
17:30	Scoring by quarter: 25–23, 32–17, 9–22, 24–28, Overtime: 18–7
	Pts: Peterka 22; Rebs: Svoboda 8 Asts: Sehnal 13	Boxscore	Pts: Frey 31; Rebs: Ndow 8 Asts: Espe, Frey 6	Arena: Královka Arena; Attendance: 1,652; Referees: Blaž Zupančič (SLO), Tomasz Łangowski (POL), Branimir Galić (CRO)

26 November 2026	Norway	vs.	Belgium	Kongsberg
19:30
		Boxscore		Arena: Kongsberghallen

29 November 2026	Czechia	vs.	Belgium	Prague
17:45
		Boxscore		Arena: Královka Arena

25 February 2027	Norway	vs.	Czechia
		Boxscore

28 February 2027	Belgium	vs.	Norway
		Boxscore

=== Third round ===
The pre-qualifiers third round will be played from 24 July to 11 August 2027. Fourteen teams participate: the six teams eliminated from the first round will be joined by the eight teams eliminated from the second round. The teams will play in two groups of four and two groups of three with the four group winners advance to the Qualifiers.

==== Teams ====
Entrance/qualification method	Team(s)
Eliminated from the First round	Albania; Armenia; Azerbaijan; Ireland; Kosovo; Luxembourg
Eliminated from the Second round	

==== Groups ====
All times are local.

===== Group H =====
Pos	Team	Pld	W	L	PF	PA	PD	Pts	Qualification
1	Team 1	0	0	0	0	0	0	0	Qualifiers
2	Team 2	0	0	0	0	0	0	0	
3	Team 3	0	0	0	0	0	0	0	
4	Team 4	0	0	0	0	0	0	0	

First match(es) will be played: 24 July 2027. Source: FIBA

===== Group I =====
Pos	Team	Pld	W	L	PF	PA	PD	Pts	Qualification
1	Team 1	0	0	0	0	0	0	0	Qualifiers
2	Team 2	0	0	0	0	0	0	0	
3	Team 3	0	0	0	0	0	0	0	
4	Team 4	0	0	0	0	0	0	0	

First match(es) will be played: 24 July 2027. Source: FIBA

===== Group J =====
Pos	Team	Pld	W	L	PF	PA	PD	Pts	Qualification
1	Team 1	0	0	0	0	0	0	0	Qualifiers
2	Team 2	0	0	0	0	0	0	0	
3	Team 3	0	0	0	0	0	0	0	

First match(es) will be played: 24 July 2027. Source: FIBA

===== Group K =====
Pos	Team	Pld	W	L	PF	PA	PD	Pts	Qualification
1	Team 1	0	0	0	0	0	0	0	Qualifiers
2	Team 2	0	0	0	0	0	0	0	
3	Team 3	0	0	0	0	0	0	0	

First match(es) will be played: 24 July 2027. Source: FIBA

== Qualifiers ==
The EuroBasket 2025 Qualifiers will be played in between 2028 and 2029. 32 teams, including the Eurobasket co-hosts, will be drawn into eight groups by four teams. Three teams from each group will qualify for the Eurobasket 2029. For the groups containing the host teams: Estonia, Greece, Slovenia and Spain. The host and the two other highest placed teams will qualify for the tournament. They will also earn their place in the qualifiers for the 2031 FIBA World Cup, alongside France, who automatically qualified as host.

=== Teams ===
Entrance / qualification method	Team(s)
Host nations	Estonia; Greece; Slovenia; Spain
2027 World Cup qualifiers second round teams	Bosnia and Herzegovina; Croatia; Finland; France; Georgia; Germany; Hungary; Iceland; Israel; Italy; Latvia; Lithuania; Montenegro; Netherlands; Poland; Portugal; Serbia; Sweden; Turkey; Ukraine
Pre-Qualifiers Second round	TBD; TBD; TBD; TBD
Pre-Qualifiers Third round	TBD; TBD; TBD; TBD

== Qualified teams ==
Team	Qualification method	Date of qualification	Appearance(s)				Previous best performance	World Ranking	
Team	Qualification method	Date of qualification	Total	First	Last	Streak	Previous best performance	Bef	Aft
Estonia	Host nation	22 May 2025	8th	1937	2025	3	Fifth place (1937, 1939)	TBD	TBD
Greece	Host nation	22 May 2025	30th	1949	2025	19	Champions (1987, 2005)	TBD	TBD
Slovenia	Host nation	22 May 2025	16th	1993	2025	16	Champions (2017)	TBD	TBD
Spain	Host nation	22 May 2025	34th	1935	2025	33	Champions (2009, 2011, 2015, 2022)	TBD	TBD
