= Basketball at the Islamic Solidarity Games =

Basketball at the Islamic Solidarity Games is part of a multi-sport event held between nations from the Muslim world. The competition was played with a 5x5 format from the first edition in 2005 until 2013. Since 2017, it has been played as a 3x3 basketball event.

== Men's tournament ==
=== Summary ===
Year	Hosts	Final standings					
Year	Hosts	Gold medal	Score	Silver medal	Bronze medal	Score	Fourth place
5x5 basketball
2005; Details	Saudi Arabia (Mecca (Note: The Games main host was Mecca, however basketball was held in Medina.))	Azerbaijan	82–69	Algeria	Iran	75–66	Tunisia
2010	Iran (Tehran)	Cancelled					
2013; Details	Indonesia (Palembang)	Turkey	No playoffs	Palestine	Indonesia	No playoffs	Kuwait
3x3 basketball
2017; Details	Azerbaijan (Baku)	Azerbaijan	13–9	Qatar	Turkey	17–10	Turkmenistan
2021; Details	Turkey (Konya)	Senegal	21–16	Azerbaijan	Iran	21–11	Suriname

=== Medals per nation ===
Rank	Nation	Gold	Silver	Bronze	Total
1	Azerbaijan	2	1	0	3
2	Turkey	1	0	1	2
3	Senegal	1	0	0	1
4	Algeria	0	1	0	1
4	Palestine	0	1	0	1
4	Qatar	0	1	0	1
7	Iran	0	0	2	2
8	Indonesia	0	0	1	1
Totals (8 entries)		4	4	4	12

=== Participating nations ===
Nation	(Saudi Arabia) 2005	(Indonesia) 2013	(Azerbaijan) 2017	(Turkey) 2021
Algeria	2nd			
Azerbaijan	1st		1st	2nd
Chad	9th			
Gabon				F
Guyana				GS
Indonesia		3rd	QF	
Iran	3rd			3rd
Iraq				F
Ivory Coast			QF	
Jordan	8th		GS	QF
Kuwait	12th	4th		
Kyrgyzstan	14th			GS
Libya	11th			
Maldives	17th			GS
Mali			QF	QF
Mauritania				GS
Morocco	5th			GS
Pakistan	15th		GS	
Palestine	10th	2nd		GS
Qatar			2nd	GS
Saudi Arabia	6th	5th	QF	
Senegal				1st
Somalia	17th			
Sudan	16th			F
Suriname				4th
Syria	7th			
Tajikistan	17th			
Tunisia	4th			
Turkey		1st	3rd	GS
Turkmenistan			4th	QF
Uganda				QF
Yemen	13th			

== Women's tournament ==
=== Summary ===
Year	Hosts	Final standings					
Year	Hosts	Gold medal	Score	Silver medal	Bronze medal	Score	Fourth place
5x5 basketball
2013; Details	Indonesia (Palembang)	Indonesia	No playoffs	Egypt	Qatar	No playoffs	
3x3 basketball
2017; Details	Azerbaijan (Baku)	Azerbaijan	13–7	Mali	Turkey	13–9	Turkmenistan
2021; Details	Turkey (Konya)	Azerbaijan	21–6	Mali	Turkey	14–10	Uzbekistan

=== Medals per nation ===
Rank	Nation	Gold	Silver	Bronze	Total
1	Azerbaijan	2	0	0	2
2	Indonesia	1	0	0	1
3	Mali	0	2	0	2
4	Egypt	0	1	0	1
5	Turkey	0	0	2	2
6	Qatar	0	0	1	1
Totals (6 entries)		3	3	3	9

== Combined medal summary ==
Rank	Nation	Gold	Silver	Bronze	Total
1	Azerbaijan	4	1	0	5
2	Turkey	1	0	3	4
3	Indonesia	1	0	1	2
4	Senegal	1	0	0	1
5	Mali	0	2	0	2
6	Qatar	0	1	1	2
7	Algeria	0	1	0	1
7	Egypt	0	1	0	1
7	Palestine	0	1	0	1
10	Iran	0	0	2	2
Totals (10 entries)		7	7	7	21
