= 2008 FIBA Europe Under-20 Championship – Division B =

Basketball standings

'2008 FIBA Europe Under-20 Championship – Division B lists the standings for the 2008 FIBA championship (known as the FIBA Basketball World Cup since 2010) for the Under-20 B Division. FIBA Division B is the second highest division in international Basketball competition after Division A.

== Qualified teams ==
Group A	Group B	Group C	Group D
Finland; Macedonia; Great Britain; Norway; Portugal	Azerbaijan; Czech Republic; Germany; Ireland; Sweden	Austria; Belgium; Estonia; Slovakia; Switzerland	Hungary; Netherlands; Poland; Romania

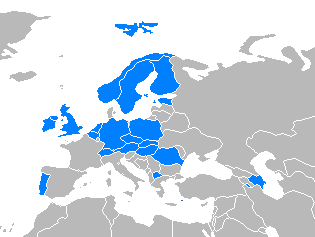

== Squads ==
At the start of tournament, all 16 participating countries will have 12 players on their roster.

== Venues ==
City	Arena	Capacity
Targu Mureş	Sala Sporturilor ( City Sport Arena)	2,500
Targu Mureş	U.M.F. Medicina	800
Targu Mureş	Sala Scolii Gen. Nr. 18 (Practice venue)	N/A

== Preliminary round ==
Qualified for the qualifying round

=== Group A ===
Team	Pts.	W	L	PCT	PF	PA	Diff
Finland							
North Macedonia							
Great Britain							
Norway							
Portugal							

August 1
18:00

Portugal	vs.	North Macedonia

Palacio Municipal de Deportes de Granada, Granada

August 1
20:30

Finland	vs.	Great Britain

Palacio Municipal de Deportes de Granada, Granada

August 2
18:00

Norway	vs.	Finland

Palacio Municipal de Deportes de Granada, Granada

August 2
20:30

Great Britain	vs.	Portugal

Palacio Municipal de Deportes de Granada, Granada

August 3
18:00

Portugal	vs.	Norway

Palacio Municipal de Deportes de Granada, Granada

August 3
20:30

North Macedonia	vs.	Great Britain

Palacio Municipal de Deportes de Granada, Granada

August 4
20:30

Finland	vs.	Portugal

Palacio Municipal de Deportes de Granada, Granada

August 4
20:30

Norway	vs.	North Macedonia

Palacio Municipal de Deportes de Granada, Granada

August 5
20:30

North Macedonia	vs.	Finland

Palacio Municipal de Deportes de Granada, Granada

August 5
20:30

Great Britain	vs.	Norway

Palacio Municipal de Deportes de Granada, Granada

=== Group B ===
Team	Pts.	W	L	PCT	PF	PA	Diff
Azerbaijan							
Czech Republic							
Germany							
Ireland							
Sweden							

August 1
19:00

Germany	vs.	Azerbaijan

Palacio Municipal de Deportes San Pablo, Seville

August 1
21:30

Czech Republic	vs.	Sweden

Palacio Municipal de Deportes San Pablo, Seville

August 2
19:00

Ireland	vs.	Czech Republic

Palacio Municipal de Deportes San Pablo, Seville

August 2
21:30

Sweden	vs.	Germany

Palacio Municipal de Deportes San Pablo, Seville

August 3
19:00

Azerbaijan	vs.	Sweden

Palacio Municipal de Deportes San Pablo, Seville

August 3
21:30

Germany	vs.	Ireland

Palacio Municipal de Deportes San Pablo, Seville

August 4
20:30

Ireland	vs.	Azerbaijan

Palacio Municipal de Deportes de Granada, Granada

August 4
20:30

Czech Republic	vs.	Germany

Palacio Municipal de Deportes de Granada, Granada

August 5
20:30

Sweden	vs.	Ireland

Palacio Municipal de Deportes de Granada, Granada

August 5
20:30

Azerbaijan	vs.	Czech Republic

Palacio Municipal de Deportes de Granada, Granada

=== Group C ===
Team	Pts.	W	L	PCT	PF	PA	Diff
Austria							
Belgium							
Estonia							
Slovakia							
Switzerland							

August 1
18:00

Estonia	vs.	Switzerland

Palma Arena, Palma de Mallorca

August 1
20:30

Belgium	vs.	Austria

Palma Arena, Palma de Mallorca

August 2
18:00

Slovakia	vs.	Belgium

Palma Arena, Palma de Mallorca

August 2
20:30

Austria	vs.	Estonia

Palma Arena, Palma de Mallorca

August 3
18:00

Switzerland	vs.	Austria

Palma Arena, Palma de Mallorca

August 3
20:30

Estonia	vs.	Slovakia

Palma Arena, Palma de Mallorca

August 4
21:30

Slovakia	vs.	Switzerland

Centro de Tecnificación de Alicante, Alicante

August 4
21:30

Belgium	vs.	Estonia

Centro de Tecnificación de Alicante, Alicante

August 5
21:30

Switzerland	vs.	Belgium

Centro de Tecnificación de Alicante, Alicante

August 5
21:30

Austria	vs.	Slovakia

Centro de Tecnificación de Alicante, Alicante

=== Group D ===
Team	Pts.	W	L	PCT	PF	PA	Diff
Hungary							
Netherlands							
Poland							
Romania							

August 1
19:00

Netherlands	vs.	Hungary

Centro de Tecnificación de Alicante, Alicante

August 1
21:30

Romania	vs.	Poland

Centro de Tecnificación de Alicante, Alicante

August 3
19:00

Poland	vs.	Netherlands

Centro de Tecnificación de Alicante, Alicante

August 3
21:30

Hungary	vs.	Romania

Centro de Tecnificación de Alicante, Alicante

August 5
19:00

Poland	vs.	Hungary

Centro de Tecnificación de Alicante, Alicante

August 5
21:30

Netherlands	vs.	Romania

Centro de Tecnificación de Alicante, Alicante

== Qualifying round ==
Qualified for the quarterfinals

=== Group E ===
Team	Pts.	W	L	PCT
A1				
A2				
A3				
B1				
B2				
B3				

August 6
16:30

B3	vs.	A1

Madrid Arena, Madrid

August 6
19:00

B2	vs.	A2

Madrid Arena, Madrid

August 7
21:30

A3	vs.	B1

Madrid Arena, Madrid

August 7
16:30

A1	vs.	B2

Madrid Arena, Madrid

=== Group F ===
Team	Pts.	W	L	PCT
C1				
C2				
C3				
D1				
D2				
D3				

August 6
16:30

D3	vs.	C1

Madrid Arena, Madrid

August 6
19:00

D2	vs.	C2

Madrid Arena, Madrid

August 7
21:30

C3	vs.	D1

Madrid Arena, Madrid

August 7
16:30

C1	vs.	D2

Madrid Arena, Madrid

=== Group G ===
Team	Pts.	W	L	PCT
A1				
A2				
A3				
B1				
B2				
B3				

August 6
16:30

A3	vs.	B4

Madrid Arena, Madrid

August 6
19:00

B3	vs.	A4

Madrid Arena, Madrid

August 7
21:30

B3	vs.	A3

Madrid Arena, Madrid

August 7
16:30

A4	vs.	B4

Madrid Arena, Madrid

=== Group H ===
Team	Pts.	W	L	PCT
C1				
C2				
C3				
D1				
D2				
D3				

August 6
16:30

C3	vs.	D4

Madrid Arena, Madrid

August 6
19:00

D3	vs.	C4

Madrid Arena, Madrid

August 7
21:30

D3	vs.	C3

Madrid Arena, Madrid

August 7
16:30

D4	vs.	C4

Madrid Arena, Madrid

== Knockout stage ==
=== 1st place bracket ===
Semi-finals
August 9
E1
F2
August 9
F1
E2

Final
August 10
Winner of (62)
Winner of (63)
Third place
August 10
Loser of (62)
Loser of (63)

=== 5th place bracket ===
Semi-finals
August 9
E3
E4
August 9
F3
F4

Fifth place
August 10
Winner of (60)
Winner of (61)
Seventh place
August 10
Loser of (60)
Loser of (61)

=== 9th place bracket ===
Semi-finals
August 9
G1
H2
August 9
H1
G2

9th Place
August 10
Winner of (58)
Winner of (59)
11th Place
August 10
Loser of (58)
Loser of (59)

=== 13th place bracket ===
Semi-finals
August 9
G3
H4
August 9
H3
G4

13th Place
August 10
winner of (56)
winner of (57)
15th Place
August 10
Loser of (56)
Loser of (57)

=== Semifinals ===
August 9

E1	vs.	F2

Palacio de Deportes de la Comunidad de Madrid, Madrid

August 9

F1	vs.	E2

Palacio de Deportes de la Comunidad de Madrid, Madrid

=== Classification round for 5th to 8th place ===
August 9

E3	vs.	F4

Palacio de Deportes de la Comunidad de Madrid, Madrid

August 9

F3	vs.	E4

Palacio de Deportes de la Comunidad de Madrid, Madrid

=== Classification Round for ninth to 12th place ===
August 9

G1	vs.	H2

Palacio de Deportes de la Comunidad de Madrid, Madrid

August 9

H1	vs.	G2

Palacio de Deportes de la Comunidad de Madrid, Madrid

=== Classification Round for 13th to 16th place ===
August 9

G3	vs.	H4

Palacio de Deportes de la Comunidad de Madrid, Madrid

August 9

H3	vs.	G4

Palacio de Deportes de la Comunidad de Madrid, Madrid

=== Final ===
August 10

Winner of (62)	vs.	Winner of (63)

Palacio de Deportes de la Comunidad de Madrid, Madrid

=== Classification game for 3rd to 4th place ===
August 10

Loser of (62)	vs.	Loser of (63)

Palacio de Deportes de la Comunidad de Madrid, Madrid

=== Classification Game for 5th to 6th place ===
August 10

winner of (60)	vs.	winner of (61)

Palacio de Deportes de la Comunidad de Madrid, Madrid

=== Classification game for 7th to 8th place ===
August 10

Loser of (60)	vs.	Loser of (61)

Palacio de Deportes de la Comunidad de Madrid, Madrid

=== Classification game for 9th to 10th place ===
August 10

winner of (58)	vs.	winner of (59)

Palacio de Deportes de la Comunidad de Madrid, Madrid

=== Classification game for 11th to 12th place ===
August 10

Loser of (58)	vs.	Loser of (59)

Palacio de Deportes de la Comunidad de Madrid, Madrid

=== Classification game for 13th to 14th place ===
August 10

winner of (56)	vs.	winner of (57)

Palacio de Deportes de la Comunidad de Madrid, Madrid

=== Classification game for 15th to 16th place ===
August 10

looser of (56)	vs.	looser of (57)

Palacio de Deportes de la Comunidad de Madrid, Madrid

=== Classification round for 17th to 19th place ===
==== Group I ====
Team	Pts.	W	L	PCT	PF	PA	Diff
A5							
B5							
C5							

August 6
21:30

A5	vs.	B5

Madrid Arena, Madrid

August 8
16:30

B5	vs.	C5

Madrid Arena, Madrid

August 10
16:30

C5	vs.	A5

Madrid Arena, Madrid
