= Slovakia men's national basketball team =

Slovakia
- FIBA ranking: 72 ▼2 (1 September 2026)
- Joined FIBA: 1993
- FIBA zone: FIBA Europe
- National federation: SBA
- Coach: Oliver Vidin
- Nickname(s): Repre (The Representatives)

FIBA World Cup
- Appearances: None

EuroBasket
- Appearances: None
Home	Away

First international
- Bosnia 97–69 Slovakia (Wrocław, Poland; 30 May 1993)

Biggest win
- Slovakia 100–39 Malta (Levice, Slovakia; 7 September 2005)

Biggest defeat
- Belgium 102–59 Slovakia (Mons, Belgium; 30 June 2022)

The Slovakia men's national basketball team (Slovak: Slovenské národné basketbalové mužstvo) represents Slovakia in international basketball competition. The supervising body is the Slovak Basketball Association (SBA).

Slovakia is one of the newest national basketball teams in the world, having split from Czechoslovakia following the dissolution of the unified state in 1993. They joined FIBA later that year, and played in their first international match against Bosnia and Herzegovina. Slovakia to date does not have much history on the international level. Although they have attempted to qualify for major tournaments such as EuroBasket and the FIBA World Cup, but have yet to reach qualification.

== History ==
=== The Czechoslovak era ===
Until 1993, Slovakia was a part of Czechoslovakia, with Slovak born players taking part on the Czechoslovakia national team. One of the most notable players who was born in Slovakia, and played for the Czechoslovakia national team to achieve success at the international level was Stanislav Kropilák. He helped lead Czechoslovakia to three medal finishes at the EuroBasket, in 1977, 1981, and 1985.

=== After independence ===
After gaining independence from Czechoslovakia, the Slovak national team on numerous attempts during their early years strived to qualify for EuroBasket, but ultimately came up short. In qualification to reach EuroBasket 2017, Slovakia was slotted into Group F to begin the qualifiers. Slovakia, however, would go on to struggle to a (1–5) record and missing their chance to qualify.

For qualification to the 2019 FIBA World Cup, Slovakia took part in European Pre-Qualifiers, but were eventually eliminated after amassing a (1–5) record in their group. Slovakia later went through EuroBasket 2022 Pre-Qualifiers, but were once again denied of making it to the continental stage, after finishing with a (3–5) record during pre-qualifying.

== Competitive record ==
=== FIBA World Cup ===
World Cup					Qualification		
Year	Position	Pld	W	L	Pld	W	L
1950 to 1990	Part of Czechoslovakia						
(Canada) 1994	Did not qualify				EuroBasket served as qualifiers		
(Greece) 1998	Did not qualify				EuroBasket served as qualifiers		
(United States) 2002	Did not qualify				EuroBasket served as qualifiers		
(Japan) 2006	Did not qualify				EuroBasket served as qualifiers		
(Turkey) 2010	Did not qualify				EuroBasket served as qualifiers		
(Spain) 2014	Did not qualify				EuroBasket served as qualifiers		
(China) 2019	Did not qualify				6	1	5
(Philippines) (Japan) (Indonesia) 2023	Did not qualify				16	5	11
(Qatar) 2027	Did not qualify				4	1	3
(France) 2031	To be determined				To be determined		
Total	0/9				26	7	19

=== Olympic Games ===
Olympic Games					Qualifying		
Year	Position	Pld	W	L	Pld	W	L
1936 to 1992	Part of Czechoslovakia						
1996 to 2016	Did not qualify				Did not qualify		
(Japan) 2020	Did not qualify				Did not qualify		
(France) 2024	Did not qualify				Did not qualify		
(United States) 2028	To be determined				To be determined		
Total	0/8						

=== EuroBasket ===
EuroBasket					Qualification		
Year	Position	Pld	W	L	Pld	W	L
1935 to 1991	Part of Czechoslovakia						
(Germany) 1993	Did not qualify				3	1	2
(Greece) 1995	Did not qualify				11	7	4
(Spain) 1997	Did not qualify				10	1	9
(France) 1999	Did not qualify				13	5	8
(Turkey) 2001	Did not qualify				15	3	12
(Sweden) 2003	Did not qualify				6	3	3
(Serbia and Montenegro) 2005	Division B				6	4	2
(Spain) 2007	Division B				6	4	2
(Poland) 2009	Division B				8	4	4
(Lithuania) 2011	Division B				6	3	3
(Slovenia) 2013	Did not qualify				10	1	9
(France) (Croatia) (Germany) (Latvia) 2015	Did not qualify				10	2	8
(Finland) (Israel) (Romania) (Turkey) 2017	Did not qualify				6	1	5
(Czech Republic) (Georgia (country)) (Italy) (Germany) 2022	Did not qualify				8	3	5
(Cyprus) (Finland) (Poland) (Latvia) 2025	Did not qualify				16	8	8
(Estonia) (Greece) (Slovenia) (Spain) 2029	To be determined				In progress		
Total	0/15				134	50	84

== Team ==
=== Current roster ===
Roster for the EuroBasket 2029 Pre-Qualifiers match on 30 August 2026 against Great Britain.

Slovakia men's national basketball team roster
Players
Coaches

Pos.	No.	Name	Age – Date of birth	Height	Club	Ctr.
PG	1	Peter Kováčik	21 – 15 March 2005	1.90 m (6 ft 3 in)	Handlová	(Slovakia)
PG	4	Mário Ihring	28 – 13 June 1998	1.92 m (6 ft 4 in)	Krka	(Hungary)
PF	10	Vladimír Brodziansky	32 – 8 May 1994	2.10 m (6 ft 11 in)	New Taipei CTBC DEA	(Taiwan)
C	13	Maroš Zelizňák	27 – 15 February 1999	2.11 m (6 ft 11 in)	Prievidza	(Slovakia)
SG	14	Dávid Abrhám	29 – 9 October 1996	1.93 m (6 ft 4 in)	Slovan	(Slovakia)
SF	15	Matúš Hronský	23 – 30 June 2003	2.03 m (6 ft 8 in)	Prievidza	(Slovakia)
C	20	Tomáš Pavelka	25 – 22 September 2000	2.14 m (7 ft 0 in)	Slovan	(Slovakia)
F	21	Marek Doležaj	28 – 13 April 1998	2.06 m (6 ft 9 in)	Legnano	(Iceland)
SG	22	Dalibor Hlivák	31 – 25 May 1995	1.91 m (6 ft 3 in)	Prievidza	(Slovakia)
SF	26	Juraj Páleník	26 – 4 April 2000	2.05 m (6 ft 9 in)	Lokomotiva Plzeň	(Czech Republic)
G/F	41	Thomas Stanko	18 – 28 November 2007	2.07 m (6 ft 9 in)	Nymburk	(Czech Republic)
SG	77	Lukáš Bolek	29 – 11 August 1997	1.94 m (6 ft 4 in)	Nitra Blue Wings	(Slovakia)

Head coach

- (Serbia) Oliver Vidin

Assistant coach(es)

- (Poland) Wojciech Walich
- (Slovakia) Maroš Helmecy

Legend

- (C) Team captain
- Club – describes last
  club before the competition
- Age – describes age
  on 30 August 2026

=== Depth chart ===
Pos.	Starting 5	Bench 1	Bench 2	Bench 3
C	Tomáš Pavelka	Michael Fusek	Marek Dolezaj	Maroš Zelizňák
PF	Vladimír Brodziansky	Jakub Mokráň	Maroš Golian	Thomas Stanko
SF	Timotej Malovec	Dávid Abrhám	Matúš Hronský	Sebastián Rančík
SG	Mário Ihring	Dalibor Hlivák	Matúš Malovec	Lukáš Bolek
PG	David DeJulius	Šimon Krajčovič	Peter Kováčik	Samuel Volárik

== Head coach position ==
- (Slovakia) Milan Černický – (2004–2010)
- (Slovakia) Peter Bálint – (2011–2012)
- (Slovakia) Miroslav Grznár – (2012–2013)
- (Slovakia) Milan Černický – (2014–2015)
- (Croatia) Ivan Rudež – (2016–2018)
- (Croatia) Žan Tabak – (2019–2021)
- (Russia) Oleg Meleshchenko – (2021–2022)
- (Croatia) Aramis Naglić – (2022–2025)
- (Serbia) Oliver Vidin – (2025–present)

== Results and fixtures ==
Win Loss

=== 2025 ===
27 November 2025 EuroBasket 2029 pre-qualifiers – 1st round	Slovakia	73–63	Albania	Prievidza, Slovakia
18:00 (UTC+1)	Scoring by quarter: 19–23, 22–12, 16–17, 16–11
	Pts: Kováčik 13; Rebs: Golian 8 Asts: Ihring 5	Boxscore	Pts: Tola 16; Rebs: Hamati 10; Asts: Dusha, Hysa 3	Arena: Športová Hala Prievidza; Attendance: 1,764; Referees: Zoran Mitrovski (MKD), Viktor Nagy (HUN), Nermin Hodžić (GER)

=== 2026 ===
27 February 2025 EuroBasket 2029 pre-qualifiers – 1st round	Kosovo	78–89	Slovakia	Prizren, Kosovo
19:00 (UTC+1)	Scoring by quarter: 27–18, 15–30, 24–26, 12–15
	Pts: Myles 21; Rebs: Shoshi 6 Asts: Myles 5	Boxscore	Pts: DeJulius 26; Rebs: Golian 18; Asts: DeJulius 8	Arena: Sezai Surroi Sports Hall; Attendance: 700; Referees: Ali Şakacı (TUR), Alija Ferevski (MKD), Alin Faur (ROU)

2 March 2026 EuroBasket 2029 pre-qualifiers – 1st round	Albania	68–94	Slovakia	Shkodër, Albania
18:00 (UTC+1)	Scoring by quarter: 15–17, 20–30, 22–17, 11–30
	Pts: Taflaj, Tola 16; Rebs: Krypci 8 Asts: Tola 4	Boxscore	Pts: DeJulius 26; Rebs: Pavelka 10; Asts: S. Krajčovič 7	Arena: Pallati i Sportit Qazim Dervishi; Attendance: 300; Referees: Mehmet Karabilecen (TUR), Sava Ćetković (MNE), Goran Grbić (SVN)

5 July 2026 EuroBasket 2029 pre-qualifiers – 1st round	Slovakia	86–83	Kosovo	Spišská Nová Ves, Slovakia
18:00 (UTC+2)	Scoring by quarter: 33–22, 17–20, 20–21, 16–20
	Pts: Hronský 20; Rebs: Brodziansky 11; Asts: Hlivák 8	Boxscore	Pts: Hajrizi 20; Rebs: Shoshi 13; Asts: Hajrizi, Myles 4	Arena: Spiš Aréna; Attendance: 3,509; Referees: Viktor Nagy (HUN), Gabrielius Simonavičius (LTU), Martin Van Howe (BEL)

30 August 2026 EuroBasket 2029 pre-qualifiers – 2nd round	Great Britain	97–72	Slovakia	Newcastle, England
17:00 (UTC+1)	Scoring by quarter: 29–22, 19–16, 24–17, 25–17
	Pts: Uduje 14; Rebs: Williams 9 Asts: Williams 6	Boxscore	Pts: Brodziansky 24; Rebs: Brodziansky 14; Asts: Kováčik 4	Arena: Vertu Motors Arena; Attendance: 2,381; Referees: Marius Ciulin (ROU), Valerio Grigioni (ITA), Nermin Hodžić (GER)

26 November 2026 EuroBasket 2029 pre-qualifiers – 2nd round	Slovakia	vs.	Switzerland	Bratislava, Slovakia
18:00 (UTC+1)
		Boxscore		Arena: Gopass Arena

=== 2027 ===
25 February 2027 EuroBasket 2029 pre-qualifiers – 2nd round	Slovakia	vs.	Great Britain	Slovakia
--:-- (UTC+1)
		Boxscore

28 February 2027 EuroBasket 2029 pre-qualifiers – 2nd round	Switzerland	vs.	Slovakia	Switzerland
--:-- (UTC+1)
		Boxscore

== See also ==
- Sport in Slovakia
- Slovakia women's national basketball team
- Slovakia men's national under-20 basketball team
- Slovakia men's national under-18 basketball team
- Slovakia men's national under-16 basketball team
