= 2006 European Promotion Cup for Men =

Tournament details
- Host country: Albania
- City: Durrës
- Dates: 29 May – 3 June 2006
- Teams: 8 (from 1 confederation)
- Venue: 1 (in 1 host city)

Final positions
- Champions: Azerbaijan (1st title)
- Runners-up: Albania
- Third place: Andorra

Official website
- www.fibaeurope.com

The 2006 European Promotion Cup for Men was the third-ranked tier (lowest) of the bi-annual EuroBasket competition. The winner of this tournament was Azerbaijan.

== Group phase ==
=== Group A ===
Team	Pts	W	L	PF	PA	Diff
Moldova	6	3	0	265	193	+72
Andorra	5	2	1	228	227	+1
Malta	4	1	2	209	228	-19
Gibraltar	3	0	3	184	238	-54

=== Group B ===
Team	Pts	W	L	PF	PA	Diff
Albania	6	3	0	262	208	+54
Azerbaijan	5	2	1	227	223	+4
San Marino	4	1	2	223	231	-8
Wales	3	0	3	196	246	-50

== Final round ==
Semifinals
Andorra	101
Albania	111
Moldova	70
Azerbaijan	91

Final
Albania	57
Azerbaijan	66
Bronze medal game
Andorra	94
Moldova	85

== Classification games for 5th to 8th places ==
- Malta 61 – 71 Wales
- Gibraltar 54 – 74 San Marino

=== Placings 7th and 8th ===
- Malta 55 – 60 Gibraltar

=== Placings 5th and 6th ===
- Wales 66 – 71 San Marino

== Final standings ==
1. Azerbaijan
2. Albania
3. Andorra
4. Moldova
5. San Marino
6. Wales
7. Gibraltar
8. Malta
