= 2014 FIBA Asia Cup qualification =

Qualifying for the 2014 FIBA Asia Cup was held to determine the eight teams that will participate in the 2014 FIBA Asia Cup, aside from the host team China and 2013 FIBA Asia Championship winners Iran. Qualification was via FIBA Asia zone, with each zone having an automatic one berth, plus additional berths from the teams' zones of the second and third runners-up in the 2013 FIBA Asia Championship.

== Central Asia ==
Uzbekistan was Central Asia's representative, but withdrew prior to the tournament. They were not replaced.

== East Asia ==
Chinese Taipei and Japan qualified automatically by virtue of being the lone registrants in East Asian qualifying.

== South Asia ==
The 2014 South Asian Basketball Association Championship in Kathmandu, Nepal determined South Asia's qualifier.

Team	W	L	Pts.
India	4	0	8
Bangladesh	3	1	7
Sri Lanka	2	2	6
Nepal	1	3	5
Maldives	0	4	4

== Southeast Asia ==
The 2014 Southeast Asian Basketball Association Cup in Batam, Indonesia determined Southeast Asia's two qualifiers.

Team	W	L	Pts.
Singapore	2	0	4
Indonesia	1	1	3
Malaysia	0	2	2

== West Asia ==
The 2014 West Asian Basketball Association Championship in Amman, Jordan determined South Asia's qualifier. Iran, which has sent in its under-18 team in preparation for the 2014 FIBA Asia Under-18 Championship automatically qualified whether or not they win the tournament by virtue of winning the 2013 FIBA Asia Championship.

Qualified for the 2014 FIBA Asia Cup

Team	Pld	W	L	PF	PA	PD	Pts
Jordan	5	5	0	388	277	+111	10
Iran	5	4	1	338	296	+42	9
Syria	5	3	2	417	352	+65	8
Iraq	5	2	3	343	310	+33	7
Palestine	5	1	4	324	359	−35	6
Yemen	5	0	5	226	442	−216	5

May 25

Jordan	98–38	Yemen

Amman

May 25

Syria	72–66	Iraq

Amman

May 25

Iraq	59–56	Palestine

Amman

May 26

Palestine	55–75	Iraq

Amman

May 26

Yemen	39–76	Iran

Amman

May 26

Jordan	82–71	Syria

Amman

May 27

Iraq	90–49	Yemen

Amman

May 27

Syria	97–81	Palestine

Amman

May 27

Iran	57–69	Jordan

Amman

May 28

Yemen	54–75	Palestine

Amman

May 28

Iran	77–74	Syria

Amman

May 28

Jordan	65–54	Iraq

Amman

May 29

Yemen	46–103	Syria

Amman

May 29

Iraq	58–69	Iran

Amman

May 29

Palestine	57–74	Jordan

Amman
