= Syria men's national basketball team =

Syria
- FIBA ranking: 74 (13 July 2026)
- Joined FIBA: 1948
- FIBA zone: FIBA Asia
- National federation: Syrian Basketball Federation
- Coach: Mohammad Jamil
- Nickname(s): Nosour Qasioun (Arabic: نسور قاسيون, lit. 'Qasioun Eagles')

Olympic Games
- Appearances: None

FIBA World Cup
- Appearances: None

FIBA Asia Cup
- Appearances: 7
- Medals: None
| Home | Away |
Medal record
WABA Championship
| Gold medal – first place | 1999 Lebanon | Team |
| Gold medal – first place | 2001 Jordan | Team |
| Silver medal – second place | 2000 Lebanon | Team |
| Silver medal – second place | 2004 Iran | Team |
| Bronze medal – third place | 2008 Jordan | Team |
| Bronze medal – third place | 2010 Iraq | Team |
| Bronze medal – third place | 2011 Iraq | Team |
| Bronze medal – third place | 2014 Jordan | Team |
West Asian Games
| Bronze medal – third place | 2002 Kuwait | Team |
| Bronze medal – third place | 2005 Doha | Team |
Arab Championship
| Gold medal – first place | 1992 Syria | Team |
| Silver medal – second place | 1991 Egypt | Team |
| Silver medal – second place | 1997 Lebanon | Team |
| Bronze medal – third place | 1994 Egypt | Team |
Pan Arab Games
| Gold medal – first place | 1992 Syria | Team |
| Silver medal – second place | 1953 Egypt | Team |
| Silver medal – second place | 1957 Lebanon | Team |
| Silver medal – second place | 1997 Lebanon | Team |
| Bronze medal – third place | 1965 United Arab Republic | Team |

Syria's national basketball team (Arabic: منتخب سوريا لكرة السلة رجال), nicknamed Nosour Qasioun (Qasioun Eagles), represents Syria in international basketball competitions. The squad is governed by SBF, and is part of the FIBA Asia zone. Based on the number of overall medals won, Syria is a major force among basketball teams of WABA and ABC. The team has won eight medals at the WABA Championship and five at the Arab Basketball Championship.

Syria has qualified for the FIBA Asia Cup seven times and one time for EuroBasket throughout their history. Their best tournament result was the 4th place finish at the 2001 FIBA Asia Cup. However, Syria still seeks qualification for their first appearance to the FIBA World Cup and Olympics.

== History ==
It was created in 1948 and is one of the oldest FIBA Asia teams on the continent, although in its first years of existence it only managed to participate in the Pan Arab Games. Syria participated in the EuroBasket 1949, winning only match out of six against Lebanon.

Its first appearance at the FIBA Asia Championship was at the 1999 edition in Fukuoka, Japan where they finished in eighth place.

The team had its best year in 2001, when it finished in the Final Four of the Asian Basketball Championship in Shanghai, China.

In November 2021, FIBA lifted the ban on Syrian stadiums, which was issued due to the war in the country, and therefore for the first time in 10 years, an international match could take place. It took place on 29 November 2021 at the Al-Fayhaa Sports Arena in Damascus, where a men's basketball team played 2023 FIBA World Cup qualification match against Kazakhstan.

In early December 2021, the Syrian Basketball Federation confirmed Syria's return to the Arab Nations Championship in the UAE which will take place 9 to 16 February 2022. Syria had been absent from the event for ten years because of the Syrian war.

== Competition record ==
=== FIBA Asia Cup ===
| Year | Position | Pld | W | L |
Europe
| (Egypt) 1949 | 6th | 6 | 1 | 5 |
Asia
| (Philippines) 1960 | Part of United Arab Republic | | | |
| (Taiwan) 1963 | did not enter | | | |
| (Malaysia) 1965 | did not enter | | | |
| (South Korea) 1967 | did not enter | | | |
| (Thailand) 1969 | did not enter | | | |
| (Japan) 1971 | did not enter | | | |
| (Philippines) 1973 | did not enter | | | |
| (Thailand) 1975 | did not enter | | | |
| (Malaysia) 1977 | did not enter | | | |
| (Japan) 1979 | did not enter | | | |
| (India) 1981 | did not enter | | | |
| (Hong Kong) 1983 | did not enter | | | |
| (Malaysia) 1985 | did not enter | | | |
| (Thailand) 1987 | did not enter | | | |
| (China) 1989 | did not enter | | | |
| (Japan) 1991 | did not enter | | | |
| (Indonesia) 1993 | did not enter | | | |
| (South Korea) 1995 | did not enter | | | |
| (Saudi Arabia) 1997 | did not enter | | | |
| (Japan) 1999 | 8th place | 6 | 1 | 5 |
| (China) 2001 | 4th place | 7 | 4 | 3 |
| (China) 2003 | 9th place | 7 | 3 | 4 |
| (Qatar) 2005 | did not enter | | | |
| (Japan) 2007 | 11th place | 7 | 3 | 4 |
| (China) 2009 | did not enter | | | |
| (China) 2011 | 9th place | 8 | 4 | 4 |
| (Philippines) 2013 | did not enter | | | |
| (China) 2015 | did not qualify | | | |
| (Lebanon) 2017 | 10th place | 4 | 1 | 3 |
| (Indonesia) 2022 | 12th place | 4 | 1 | 3 |
| (Saudi Arabia) 2025 | 16th place | 3 | 0 | 3 |
| 2029 | To be determined | | | |
| Total | 8/31 | 46 | 17 | 29 |

=== FIBA Asia Challenge ===
| Year | Rank | Pld | W | L |
|---|---|---|---|---|
| (Chinese Taipei) 2004 | 4th place | 5 | 2 | 3 |
| (Kuwait) 2008 | did not qualify | | | |
| (Lebanon) 2010 | 10th place | 5 | 0 | 5 |
| (Japan) 2012 | did not qualify | | | |
| (China) 2014 | did not qualify | | | |
| (Iran) 2016 | did not qualify | | | |
| Total | 2/6 | 10 | 2 | 8 |

=== West Asian Basketball Championship ===
| Year | Rank | Pld | W | L |
|---|---|---|---|---|
| (Lebanon) 1999 | Champions | 4 | 4 | 0 |
| (Lebanon) 2000 | Runners-up | 4 | 2 | 2 |
| (Jordan) 2001 | Champions | 4 | 3 | 1 |
| (Jordan) (Iran) 2002 | did not enter | – | – | – |
| (Iran) 2004 | Runners-up | 4 | – | – |
| (Lebanon) 2005 | did not enter | – | – | – |
| (Jordan) 2008 | 3rd place | 3 | 1 | 2 |
| (Iraq) 2010 | 3rd place | 3 | 1 | 2 |
| (Iraq) 2011 | 3rd place | 3 | 1 | 2 |
| (Jordan) 2012 | 4th place | 5 | 2 | 3 |
| (Iran) 2013 | did not enter | – | – | – |
| (Jordan) 2014 | 3rd place | 5 | 3 | 2 |
| (Jordan) 2015 | 4th place | 4 | 1 | 3 |
| (Jordan) 2016 | 5th place | 4 | 0 | 4 |
| (Jordan) 2017 | 5th place | 5 | 1 | 4 |
| Total | 12/15 | 48 | 19 | 25 |

=== Asian Games ===
| Year | Rank | Pld | W | L |
|---|---|---|---|---|
| (India) 1951 | did not qualify | | | |
| (Philippines) 1954 | did not qualify | | | |
| (Japan) 1958 | did not qualify | | | |
| (Indonesia) 1962 | did not qualify | | | |
| (Thailand) 1966 | did not qualify | | | |
| (Thailand) 1970 | did not qualify | | | |
| (Iran) 1974 | did not qualify | | | |
| (Thailand) 1978 | did not qualify | | | |
| (India) 1982 | did not qualify | | | |
| (South Korea) 1986 | did not qualify | | | |
| (China) 1990 | did not qualify | | | |
| (Japan) 1994 | did not qualify | | | |
| (Thailand) 1998 | did not qualify | | | |
| (South Korea) 2002 | did not qualify | | | |
| (Qatar) 2006 | 10th place | 9 | 4 | 5 |
| (China) 2010 | did not qualify | | | |
| (South Korea) 2014 | did not qualify | | | |
| (Indonesia) 2018 | 6th place | 4 | 1 | 3 |
| (China) 2022 | did not qualify | | | |
| (Japan) 2026 | did not qualify | | | |
| Total | 2/20 | 13 | 5 | 8 |

=== West Asian Games ===
| Year | Rank | Pld | W | L |
|---|---|---|---|---|
| (Iran) 1997 | did not qualify | | | |
| (Kuwait) 2002 | 3rd place | 4 | 2 | 2 |
| (Qatar) 2005 | 3rd place | 6 | 4 | 2 |
| Total | 2/3 | 10 | 6 | 4 |

=== Mediterranean Games ===
| Year | Rank | Pld | W | L |
|---|---|---|---|---|
| (Egypt) 1951 | 7th place | – | – | – |
| (Spain) 1955 | did not qualify | | | |
| (Lebanon) 1959 | Part of United Arab Republic | | | |
| (Italy) 1963 | did not qualify | | | |
| (Tunisia) 1967 | did not qualify | | | |
| (Turkey) 1971 | 5th place | – | – | – |
| (Algeria) 1975 | did not qualify | | | |
| (Socialist Federal Republic of Yugoslavia) 1979 | did not qualify | | | |
| (Morocco) 1983 | did not qualify | | | |
| (Syria) 1987 | 5th place | – | – | – |
| (Greece) 1991 | did not qualify | | | |
| (France) 1993 | did not qualify | | | |
| (Italy) 1997 | did not qualify | | | |
| (Tunisia) 2001 | did not qualify | | | |
| (Spain) 2005 | did not qualify | | | |
| (Italy) 2009 | did not qualify | | | |
| (Turkey) 2013 | did not qualify | | | |
| (Spain) 2018 | Replaced by 3x3 Basketball Events | | | |
| (Algeria) 2022 | Replaced by 3x3 Basketball Events | | | |
| (Italy) 2026 | Replaced by 3x3 Basketball Events | | | |
| Total | 3/17 | - | - | - |

=== Arab Championship ===
| Year | Rank | Pld | W | L |
|---|---|---|---|---|
| (Iraq) 1974 | did not enter | | | |
| (Kuwait) 1975 | did not enter | | | |
| (Egypt) 1978 | did not enter | | | |
| (Tunisia) 1981 | did not enter | | | |
| (Jordan) 1983 | did not enter | | | |
| (Egypt) 1985 | Championship cancelled | | | |
| (Egypt) 1987 | did not enter | | | |
| (Syria) 1989 | Withdrew from the tournament | | | |
| (Egypt) 1991 | Runners-up | – | – | – |
| (Syria) 1992 | Champions | – | – | – |
| (Egypt) 1994 | 3rd place | – | – | – |
| (Lebanon) 1997 | Runners-up | – | – | – |
| (Jordan) 1999 | 3rd place | – | – | – |
| (Algeria) 2000 | did not enter | | | |
| (Egypt) 2002 | did not enter | | | |
| (Saudi Arabia) 2005 | did not enter | | | |
| (Egypt) 2007 | did not enter | | | |
| (Tunisia) 2008 | 4th place | – | – | – |
| (Morocco) 2009 | 4th place | – | – | – |
| (Lebanon) 2010 | did not enter | | | |
| (Egypt) 2015 | did not enter | | | |
| (Egypt) 2017 | did not enter | | | |
| (Egypt) 2018 | did not enter | | | |
| (United Arab Emirates) 2022 | Withdrew from the tournament | | | |
| (Egypt) 2023 | did not enter | | | |
| (Bahrain) 2025 | did not enter | | | |
| Total | 7/24 | - | - | - |

=== Pan Arab Games ===
| Year | Rank | Pld | W | L |
|---|---|---|---|---|
| (Egypt) 1953 | Runners-up | – | – | – |
| (Lebanon) 1957 | Runners-up | – | – | – |
| (Morocco) 1961 | did not enter | | | |
| (United Arab Republic) 1965 | 3rd place | – | – | – |
| (Syria) 1976 | Championship cancelled | | | |
| (Morocco) 1985 | 4th place | – | – | – |
| (Syria) 1992 | Champions | – | – | – |
| (Lebanon) 1997 | Runners-up | – | – | – |
| (Jordan) 1999 | 4th place | – | – | – |
| (Algeria) 2004 | did not enter | | | |
| (Egypt) 2007 | did not enter | | | |
| (Qatar) 2011 | Withdrew from the tournament | | | |
| Total | 7/12 | - | - | - |

=== Islamic Solidarity Games ===
| Year | Rank | Pld | W | L |
|---|---|---|---|---|
| (Saudi Arabia) 2005 | 7th place | 7 | 3 | 4 |
| (Indonesia) 2013 | did not qualify | | | |
| (Azerbaijan) 2017 | Replaced by 3x3 Basketball Events | | | |
| Total | 1/2 | 7 | 3 | 4 |

=== EuroBasket 1949 ===
Syria once appeared at the European championships, namely at the Eurobasket 1949, held in Cairo, Egypt. The refusal of the Soviet Union to host the competition and FIBA Europe's unwillingness to ask Czechoslovakia to host consecutive tournaments meant that 1947 bronze medallist Egypt hosted the competition. Due to travel difficulties and fears, few European teams would travel to the African country to compete. Syria, as well as Lebanon, were asked to compete in the European championship despite being Asian countries.

In the seven team round robin tournament, the Syrians finished with a 1–5 record and finished in sixth place.

- Team roster:

4 Shawki, 5 Khayat, 6 Nashawi, 7 Fo. Habash, 8 Abouhitian, 9 Qoudsi, 10 Sharaf, 11 Fe. Habash, 12 Shukri, 13 Nael, 14 Mashnouq, 15 Tinawi

== Team ==
=== Current roster ===
Roster for the 2025 FIBA Asia Cup.

Syria men's national basketball team – 2025 FIBA Asia Cup roster
Players
Coaches

| Pos. | No. | Name | Age – Date of birth | Height | Club | Ctr. |
|---|---|---|---|---|---|---|
| SG | 00 | Mohammad Albalbisi | 18 – 31 July 2007 | 1.84 m (6 ft 0 in) | Al Wahda | (Syria) |
| SG | 0 | George Nounou | 25 – 15 January 2000 | 1.82 m (6 ft 0 in) | Jalaa SC | (Syria) |
| G | 1 | Anthouny Bakar | 31 – 10 January 1994 | 1.98 m (6 ft 6 in) | Al-Ittihad | (Syria) |
| SF | 2 | Omar Idelbi | 26 – 13 July 1999 | 1.94 m (6 ft 4 in) | Al Wahda | (Syria) |
| G | 4 | George Dolmaye | 23 – 1 January 2002 | 1.89 m (6 ft 2 in) | Al Jalaa | (Syria) |
| G | 5 | Keron DeShields (NP) | 32 – 4 December 1992 | 1.91 m (6 ft 3 in) | Al-Ittihad | (Saudi Arabia) |
| PF | 7 | Kamel Abdulla | 25 – 25 January 2000 | 2.02 m (6 ft 8 in) | Al Jalaa | (Syria) |
| PG | 8 | Majd Arbasha | 35 – 21 April 1990 | 1.87 m (6 ft 2 in) | Al Wahda | (Syria) |
| PF | 13 | Mohamad Bilal Atli | 30 – 1 January 1995 | 2.03 m (6 ft 8 in) | Al-Ittihad | (Syria) |
| PF | 21 | Omar Cheikh Ali | 34 – 1 January 1991 | 2.04 m (6 ft 8 in) | Al-Karamah | (Syria) |
| PF | 23 | Hani Adribi (C) | 34 – 4 October 1990 | 2.04 m (6 ft 8 in) | Al Wahda | (United Arab Emirates) |
| PF | 33 | Christian James Maran | 26 – 1 December 1998 | 2.00 m (6 ft 7 in) | Al Wahda | (Syria) |

Head coach

- (United States) Joseph Stiebing

Assistant coach(es)

- (Syria) Oday Al-Khabbaz
- (Syria) Ali Marhoon
- (Syria) Fawaz Mreish

Legend

- (C) Team captain
- (NP) Naturalized player
- Club – describes last
  club before the tournament
- Age – describes age
  on 5 August 2025

=== Past rosters ===
==== 2022 FIBA Asia Cup ====
Syria national basketball team – 2022 FIBA Asia Cup roster
Players
Coaches

| Pos. | No. | Name | Age – Date of birth | Height | Club | Ctr. |
|---|---|---|---|---|---|---|
| SF | 1 | Anthouny Bakar | 28 – 10 January 1994 | 2.00 m (6 ft 7 in) | Al-Ittihad BC | (Syria) |
| SG | 2 | Elias Azrie | 20 – 2 January 2002 | 1.85 m (6 ft 1 in) | Al-Jalaa BC | (Syria) |
| PG | 6 | Georgi Nazarian | 28 – 4 January 1994 | 1.89 m (6 ft 2 in) | Al-Karamah BC | (Syria) |
| SG | 7 | Nadim Issa | 32 – 26 May 1990 | 1.85 m (6 ft 1 in) | Al-Ittihad BC | (Syria) |
| SG | 8 | Magd Harbasha | 29 – 21 April 1990 | 1.87 m (6 ft 2 in) | Al Wahda BC | (Syria) |
| PG | 9 | Isshak Oubeid | 27 – 22 February 1995 | 1.83 m (6 ft 0 in) | Al-Ittihad BC | (Syria) |
| C | 12 | Abdulwahab Al-Hamwi | 32 – 15 June 1990 | 2.20 m (7 ft 3 in) | Al-Ittihad BC | (Syria) |
| SF | 14 | Omar Idelbi | 23 – 13 July 1999 | 1.94 m (6 ft 4 in) | Al Wahda | (Syria) |
| PF | 15 | Hani Adribe | 31 – 4 October 1990 | 2.04 m (6 ft 8 in) | Al Wahda | (Syria) |
| PF | 21 | Omar Cheikh Ali | 31 – 1 January 1991 | 2.04 m (6 ft 8 in) | Al-Karamah BC | (Syria) |
| F | 24 | Amer Alsati | 30 – 5 April 1992 | 2.03 m (6 ft 8 in) | Shabab Al Ahli | (United Arab Emirates) |
| SG | 88 | Amir Hinton | 25 – 14 February 1997 | 1.98 m (6 ft 6 in) | Kouvot | (Finland) |

Head coach

- (Spain) Javier Juárez Crespo

Assistant coach(es)

- (Spain) Julen Fornies Martinez

Legend

- (C) Team captain
- (NP) Naturalized player
- Club – describes last
  club before the tournament
- Age – describes age
  on 19 July 2022

==== 2021 FIBA Asia Cup qualification ====
Due to the COVID-19 pandemic, the FIBA Executive Committee decided that for the 2020 November window games will be held at a single venue under a bubble format.

Venue: Al-Gharafa Sports Club Multi-Purpose Hall, Doha

Opposition: Qatar (28 November)
Opposition: Iran (30 November)

Syria national basketball team – 2021 FIBA Asia Cup qualification roster
Players
Coaches

| Pos. | No. | Name | Age – Date of birth | Height | Club | Ctr. |
|---|---|---|---|---|---|---|
| PF | 00 | Magd Bo Aetah | 32 – 6 November 1988 | 1.98 m (6 ft 6 in) | | (Syria) |
| PG | 1 | Anthouny Bakar | 26 – 10 January 1994 | 2.00 m (6 ft 7 in) | Al-Ittihad BC | (Syria) |
| SG | 5 | Wael Jlilaty | 30 – 3 January 1990 | 2.00 m (6 ft 7 in) | Al-Jalaa BC | (Syria) |
| PG | 6 | Georgi Nazarian | 26 – 4 January 1994 | 1.89 m (6 ft 2 in) | Al-Karamah BC | (Syria) |
| SG | 9 | Tarek Aljabi | 30 – 2 August 1990 | 1.83 m (6 ft 0 in) | Al-Jaish BC | (Syria) |
| PG | 10 | Rami Merjaneh | 36 – 1 December 1983 | 1.75 m (5 ft 9 in) | Al-Jaish BC | (Syria) |
| PF | 11 | Jamil Saddir | 31 – 13 January 1989 | 2.00 m (6 ft 7 in) | Al-Wathba SC | (Syria) |
| C | 12 | Abdulwahab Al-Hamwi | 30 – 15 June 1990 | 2.20 m (7 ft 3 in) | Al-Jaish BC | (Syria) |
| G | 13 | Sharif Al Osh | 32 – 14 March 1988 | 1.85 m (6 ft 1 in) | Al Wahda BC | (Syria) |
| PF | 21 | Omar Cheikh Ali | 29 – 1 January 1991 | 2.04 m (6 ft 8 in) | Al-Jaish BC | (Syria) |
| PF | 23 | Tofek Saleh | 30 – 26 March 1990 | 2.03 m (6 ft 8 in) | Al-Ittihad BC | (Syria) |
| G | 24 | Trey Kell | 24 – 5 April 1996 | 1.93 m (6 ft 4 in) | | (United States) |

Head coach

- (United States) Joe Salerno

Assistant coach(es)

- (Syria) Azzam Al-Hussein

Legend

- (C) Team captain
- (NP) Naturalized player
- Club – describes last
  club before the tournament
- Age – describes age
  on 28 November 2020

=== 2021 FIBA Asia Cup qualification ===
Opposition: Iran (20 February)
Venue: Azadi Basketball Hall, Tehran
Opposition: Saudi Arabia (23 February)
Venue: King Abdullah Sports City, Jeddah

Syria national basketball team – 2021 FIBA Asia Cup qualification roster
Players
Coaches

| Pos. | No. | Name | Age – Date of birth | Height | Club | Ctr. |
|---|---|---|---|---|---|---|
| PG | 1 | Anthouny Bakar | 26 – 10 January 1994 | 2.00 m (6 ft 7 in) | Al-Ittihad BC | (Syria) |
| SG | 3 | Zakria Alhusain | 29 – 1 January 1991 | 1.80 m (5 ft 11 in) | Al-Wathba BC | (Syria) |
| SG | 5 | Wael Jlilaty | 30 – 3 January 1990 | 2.00 m (6 ft 7 in) | Al-Jalaa BC | (Syria) |
| SG | 8 | Majd Arbasha | 29 – 21 April 1990 | 1.87 m (6 ft 2 in) | Al Wahda BC | (Syria) |
| SG | 9 | Tarek Aljabi | 29 – 2 August 1990 | 1.83 m (6 ft 0 in) | Al-Jaish BC | (Syria) |
| PG | 10 | Rami Merjaneh | 36 – 1 December 1983 | 1.75 m (5 ft 9 in) | Al-Jaish BC | (Syria) |
| PF | 11 | Jamil Saddir | 31 – 13 January 1989 | 2.00 m (6 ft 7 in) | Al-Wathba BC | (Syria) |
| C | 12 | Abdulwahab Al-Hamwi | 29 – 15 June 1990 | 2.20 m (7 ft 3 in) | Al-Jaish BC | (Syria) |
| G | 13 | Sharif Al Osh | 31 – 14 March 1988 | 1.85 m (6 ft 1 in) | Al Wahda BC | (Syria) |
| F | 15 | Hani Adribe | 29 – 4 October 1990 | 2.05 m (6 ft 9 in) | Al-Jaish BC | (Syria) |
| PF | 21 | Omar Cheikh Ali | 29 – 1 January 1991 | 2.04 m (6 ft 8 in) | Al-Jaish BC | (Syria) |
| PF | 23 | Tofek Saleh | 29 – 26 March 1990 | 2.03 m (6 ft 8 in) | Al-Ittihad BC | (Syria) |

Head coach

- (Syria) Hadi Haj Darwish

Assistant coach(es)

- (Syria) Radwan Hasaballah

Legend

- (C) Team captain
- (NP) Naturalized player
- Club – describes last
  club before the tournament
- Age – describes age
  on 20 February 2020

Roster for the 2017 FIBA Asia Cup.

Syria men's national basketball team – 2017 FIBA Asia Cup roster
Players
Coaches

| Pos. | No. | Name | Age – Date of birth | Height | Club | Ctr. |
|---|---|---|---|---|---|---|
| PG | 4 | William Al-Haddad | 30 – 5 July 1987 | 1.85 m (6 ft 1 in) |
| PG | 5 | Sharif Al-Osh | 29 – 14 March 1988 | 1.79 m (5 ft 10 in) |
| SG | 6 | Michel Madanly | 36 – 10 March 1981 | 1.92 m (6 ft 4 in) | Landslake Lions | (Netherlands) |
| SF | 7 | Khalel Khori | 19 – 6 June 1998 | 1.95 m (6 ft 5 in) |
| SF | 8 | Al Hakam Abd Allah | 35 – 1 January 1982 | 1.99 m (6 ft 6 in) |
| SG | 9 | Tarek Al-Jabi | 27 – 2 August 1990 | 1.84 m (6 ft 0 in) |
| SF | 10 | Anthouny Bakar | 23 – 10 January 1994 | 1.97 m (6 ft 6 in) |
| PF | 11 | Jamil Saddir | 28 – 13 January 1989 | 2.00 m (6 ft 7 in) |
| PF | 12 | Omar Cheikh Ali | 26 – 1 January 1991 | 2.04 m (6 ft 8 in) |
| C | 13 | Abdulwahab Al-Hamwi | 27 – 15 June 1990 | 2.18 m (7 ft 2 in) |
| C | 14 | Ivan Todorović (NP) | 33 – 17 January 1984 | 2.14 m (7 ft 0 in) |
| PF | 15 | Hani Adribe | 26 – 4 October 1990 | 2.05 m (6 ft 9 in) |

Head coach

- (Serbia) Nenad Krdzic

Assistant coach(es)

- (Syria) Hadi Haj Darwish

Legend

- (C) Team captain
- (NP) Naturalized player
- Club – describes last
  club before the tournament
- Age – describes age
  on 8 August 2017

At the 2017 WABA Championship:

Syria national basketball team roster
Players
Coaches

| Pos. | No. | Name | Age – Date of birth | Height | Club |
|---|---|---|---|---|---|---|
| PG | 4 | Georgi Nazarian | 23 – 4 January 1994 | 1.89 m (6 ft 2 in) | Al Karameh | (Syria) |
| G/F | 5 | Wael Jlilaty | 27 – 3 January 1990 | 1.99 m (6 ft 6 in) | Al Wahda | (Syria) |
| SF | 6 | Micheal Madanly | 35 – 10 March 1981 | 1.94 m (6 ft 4 in) | TNT KaTropa | (Philippines) |
| SF | 7 | Mahmoud Trab | 23 – 1 January 1994 | 1.94 m (6 ft 4 in) | Al-Ittihad | (Syria) |
| G | 8 | Magd Harbasha | 26 – 21 April 1990 | 1.80 m (5 ft 11 in) | Al Wahda | (Syria) |
| F | 9 | Sebouh Kharadjian | 25 – 6 January 1992 | 1.84 m (6 ft 0 in) | Al Yarmouk | (Syria) |
| F | 10 | Anthouny Bakar | 23 – 10 January 1994 | 1.97 m (6 ft 6 in) | Jalaa | (Syria) |
| PF | 11 | Jamil Saddir | 28 – 13 January 1989 | 2.00 m (6 ft 7 in) | Al Wahda | (Syria) |
| C | 12 | Omar Cheikh | 26 – 1 January 1991 | 2.04 m (6 ft 8 in) | Al-Jaish | (Syria) |
| PF | 13 | Khalel Khori | 18 – 6 June 1998 | 1.95 m (6 ft 5 in) | Al-Jaish | (Syria) |
| PF | 14 | Yamen Haidar | 27 – 2 April 1989 | 1.97 m (6 ft 6 in) | Al Wahda | (Syria) |
| C | 15 | Hani Adribi | 26 – 4 October 1990 | 2.05 m (6 ft 9 in) | Al Karameh | (Syria) |

Head coach

- (Syria) Hady Darwish

Assistant coach(es)

- (Syria) George Shakar

Legend

- Club – describes last
  club before the tournament
- Age – describes age
  on 29 January 2017

=== Depth chart ===
| Pos. | Starting 5 | Bench 1 | Bench 2 |
|---|---|---|---|
| C | Kemal Canpolat | Omar Cheikh |
| PF | Jamil Saddir | Khalel Khori | Yamen Haidar |
| SF | Michael Madanly | Mahmoud Trab | Anthouny Bakar |
| SG | Trey Kell | Wael Jlilaty |
| PG | Georgi Nazarian | | Sebouh Kharadjian |

=== Head coach position ===
- (United States) (Germany) Pat Elzie – 2003
- (Syria) Mohamed Abo Sada – 2007
- (Syria) Imad Othman – 2009
- (Syria) Hady Darwish – 2010
- (Bosnia and Herzegovina) Mensur Bajramović – 2011
- (Serbia) Goran Miljević – 2011
- (Syria) Imad Othman – 2012–2014
- (Syria) Hady Haj Darwish – 2014–2017
- (Serbia) Nenad Krdžić – 2017
- (Serbia) Veselin Matić – 2017–2019
- (United States) Joe Salerno – 2021–2022
- (Spain) Javier Juárez Crespo – 2022–present

== Kit ==
=== Manufacturer ===
2017–present: Adidas

== See also ==
- Syria national under-19 basketball team
- Syria national under-17 basketball team
- Syria women's national basketball team
