= Azerbaijan men's national basketball team =

Men's national basketball team representing Azerbaijan

Azerbaijan
- FIBA ranking: 100 ▼1 (1 September 2026)
- Joined FIBA: 1994
- FIBA zone: FIBA Europe
- National federation: Azerbaijan Basketball Federation
- Coach: Tahir Bakhshiyev
- Nickname(s): Milli komanda (The National Team)

FIBA World Cup
- Appearances: None

EuroBasket
- Appearances: None

Championship for Small Countries
- Appearances: 4
- Medals: (gold) Gold: (2006, 2008)
Home	Away

First international
- Belarus 121–50 Azerbaijan (Minsk, Belarus; 2 June 2001)

Biggest win
- Somalia 29–106 Azerbaijan (Medina, Saudi Arabia; 9 April 2005)

Biggest defeat
- Belarus 121–50 Azerbaijan (Minsk, Belarus; 2 June 2001)

The Azerbaijan men's national basketball team (Azerbaijani: Azərbaycan milli basketbol komandası) is the national basketball team of Azerbaijan. The team is controlled by the Azerbaijan Basketball Federation.

Since becoming members of FIBA in 1994, Azerbaijan has mostly taken part in smaller competitions such as the FIBA European Championship for Small Countries, winning it twice, in 2006 and 2008. The national team also won a title at the Islamic Solidarity Games in their lone appearance in 2005.

== History ==
After Azerbaijan obtained independence from the Soviet Union in 1991, the Azerbaijan Basketball Federation was founded in 1993, and became members of FIBA in 1994. During Azerbaijan's early years, the national team did not appear in any international competition until they entered EuroBasket 2003 qualifiers.

Following Azerbaijan's failed qualification process for EuroBasket 2003, the national team entered their first international tournament at the 2004 FIBA European Championship for Small Countries. Azerbaijan would complete the event at a (2–2) record, for a fourth place finish. A year later, the national team entered the 2005 Islamic Solidarity Games, where Azerbaijan finished the competition winning the gold medal.

In 2006, Azerbaijan participated in the 2006 FIBA European Championship for Small Countries, in which the team went (4–1), and reached the final to defeat Albania 66–57 to win the title. At the event in 2008, Azerbaijan repeated as champions, this time in an 78–80 victory over Moldova. After the tournament, Azerbaijan did not appear at an international event until EuroBasket 2013 qualifiers. However, Azerbaijan would eventually be eliminated from qualifying following a (4–4) record.

Ten years after Azerbaijan competed in their last international competition, the national team made its return at the 2022 FIBA European Championship for Small Countries. Azerbaijan went on to close out the tournament in fourth place.

== Competitive record ==
=== FIBA World Cup ===
World Cup					Qualification		
Year	Position	Pld	W	L	Pld	W	L
1950 to 1990	Part of Soviet Union				Part of Soviet Union		
(Canada) 1994	Not eligible				Not eligible		
(Greece) 1998	Did not enter				Did not enter		
(United States) 2002	Did not enter				Did not enter		
(Japan) 2006	Did not enter				Did not enter		
(Turkey) 2010	Did not enter				Did not enter		
(Spain) 2014	Did not qualify				Did not qualify		
(China) 2019	Did not enter				Did not enter		
(Philippines) (Japan) (Indonesia) 2023	Did not enter				Did not enter		
(Qatar) 2027	Did not qualify				6	1	5
(France) 2031	To be determined				To be determined		
Total	0/8				6	1	5

=== Championship for Small Countries ===
FIBA European Championship for Small Countries
Year	Position	Pld	W	L
(Andorra) 2004	4th	4	2	2
(Albania) 2006	1st place, gold medalist(s)	5	4	1
(Scotland) 2008	1st place, gold medalist(s)	5	4	1
(Malta) 2022	4th	5	1	4
Total		19	11	8

=== Islamic Solidarity Games ===
Islamic Solidarity Games
Year	Position	Pld	W	L
(Saudi Arabia) 2005	1st place, gold medalist(s)	9	7	2
Total		9	7	2

=== EuroBasket ===
EuroBasket					Qualification		
Year	Position	Pld	W	L	Pld	W	L
1947 to 1991	Part of Soviet Union				Part of Soviet Union		
(Germany) 1993	Not a FIBA Europe member				Not a FIBA Europe member		
(Greece) 1995	Not eligible				Not eligible		
(Spain) 1997	Did not enter				Did not enter		
(France) 1999	Did not enter				Did not enter		
(Turkey) 2001	Did not enter				Did not enter		
(Sweden) 2003	Did not qualify				6	0	6
(Serbia and Montenegro) 2005	Did not enter				Did not enter		
(Spain) 2007	Did not enter				Did not enter		
(Poland) 2009	Did not enter				Did not enter		
(Lithuania) 2011	Did not enter				Did not enter		
(Slovenia) 2013	Did not qualify				8	4	4
(France) (Croatia) (Germany) (Latvia) 2015	Did not enter				Did not enter		
(Finland) (Israel) (Romania) (Turkey) 2017	Did not enter				Did not enter		
(Czech Republic) (Georgia (country)) (Italy) (Germany) 2022	Did not enter				Did not enter		
(Cyprus) (Finland) (Poland) (Latvia) 2025	Did not enter				Did not enter		
(Estonia) (Greece) (Slovenia) (Spain) 2029	To be determined				To be determined		
Total	0/13				14	4	10

== Results and fixtures ==
Win Loss

=== 2025 ===
20 February 2025 2027 FIBA World Cup pre-qualifiers – 1st round	Kosovo	81–79	Azerbaijan	Pristina, Kosovo
19:30 (UTC+1)	Scoring by quarter: 20–21, 23–20, 17–18, 21–20
	Pts: Tmušić 21; Rebs: four players 5 Asts: Myles 6	Boxscore	Pts: Hall 21; Rebs: Hall 16; Asts: K. Mammadov, Turgut 5	Arena: Palace of Youth and Sports; Attendance: 1,000; Referees: Stylianos Simeonidis (GRE), Mehmet Şahin (TUR), Mladen Lučić (MNE)

23 February 2025 2027 FIBA World Cup pre-qualifiers – 1st round	Azerbaijan	64–79	Ireland	Baku, Azerbaijan
17:00 (UTC+4)	Scoring by quarter: 16–21, 14–20, 19–13, 15–25
	Pts: S. Shirzadov 14; Rebs: Hall 12; Asts: K. Mammadov 4	Boxscore	Pts: Flood 23; Rebs: N. Quinn 9 Asts: Flood 5	Arena: Baku Sports Palace; Attendance: 700; Referees: Zdravko Rutešić (MNE), Duhan Köyiçi (TUR), Nemanja Vlahović (SRB)

27 November 2025 EuroBasket 2029 pre-qualifiers – 1st round	North Macedonia	87–49	Azerbaijan	Skopje, North Macedonia
19:00 (UTC+1)	Scoring by quarter: 22–13, 18–8, 23–16, 24–12
	Pts: Jakimovski 25; Rebs: Jakimovski, Stojanovski 11; Asts: Moore 9	Boxscore	Pts: Hamzayev 12; Rebs: S. Donat 13; Asts: K. Mammadov 5	Arena: SRC Kale; Attendance: 800; Referees: Łukasz Jankowski (POL), Polat Parlak (TUR), Sava Ćetković (MNE)

30 November 2025 EuroBasket 2029 pre-qualifiers – 1st round	Azerbaijan	90–95	Luxembourg	Baku, Azerbaijan
18:00 (UTC+4)	Scoring by quarter: 18–25, 26–32, 17–25, 29–13
	Pts: Van Beck 29; Rebs: Van Beck 8 Asts: Van Beck 7	Boxscore	Pts: Kovac 29; Rebs: Kovac 9 Asts: Kovac 5	Arena: Baku Sports Palace; Attendance: 1,235; Referees: Nemanja Ninković (SRB), Ciprian Stoica (ROU), Aleksandar Radonjić (AUT)

=== 2026 ===
27 February 2025 EuroBasket 2029 pre-qualifiers – 1st round	Ireland	75–76	Azerbaijan	Dublin, Ireland
19:30 (UTC+0)	Scoring by quarter: 19–18, 16–23, 19–18, 21–17
	Pts: Flood 18; Rebs: N. Quinn 12; Asts: Fulton 11	Boxscore	Pts: Van Beck 20; Rebs: S. Donat, Van Beck 6 Asts: K. Mammadov 8	Arena: National Basketball Arena; Attendance: 2,000; Referees: Jan Baloun (CZE), Iain Macdonald (GRB), Nikola Bejat (NOR)

2 March 2026 EuroBasket 2029 pre-qualifiers – 1st round	Azerbaijan	70–78	North Macedonia	Baku, Azerbaijan
20:00 (UTC+4)	Scoring by quarter: 28–19, 16–18, 12–21, 14–20
	Pts: Van Beck 23; Rebs: S. Donat 8 Asts: K. Mammadov 4	Boxscore	Pts: Jakimovski 22; Rebs: Happ 9 Asts: Magdevski 7	Arena: Baku Sports Palace; Attendance: 1,300; Referees: Kirile Tvauri (GEO), Tomasz Langowski (POL), Emmanouil Tsolakos (GRE)

2 July 2026 EuroBasket 2029 pre-qualifiers – 1st round	Luxembourg	74–76	Azerbaijan	Luxembourg City, Luxembourg
19:00 (UTC+2)	Scoring by quarter: 18–22, 24–17, 13–18, 19–19
	Pts: Kovac 15; Rebs: Kovac 8 Asts: Kovac 4	Boxscore	Pts: K. Mammadov 19; Rebs: Aydın 12; Asts: K. Mammadov 3	Arena: d'Coque; Attendance: 1,200; Referees: Jan Baloun (CZE), Nemanja Vlahović (SRB), Jules Gaduel (FRA)

5 July 2026 EuroBasket 2029 pre-qualifiers – 1st round	Azerbaijan	70–76	Ireland	Baku, Azerbaijan
17:00 (UTC+4)	Scoring by quarter: 23–12, 12–19, 20–22, 15–23
	Pts: Van Beck 21; Rebs: Aydın 14; Asts: Aydın 6	Boxscore	Pts: Flood 25; Rebs: Alajiki 13; Asts: Alajiki, Flood 4	Arena: Baku Sports Palace; Attendance: 1,500; Referees: Mehmet Karabilecen (TUR), Vlad Cotrobaș (ROU), Sava Ćetković (MNE)

== Team ==
=== Current roster ===
Roster for the EuroBasket 2029 Pre-Qualifiers matches on 2 and 5 July 2026 against Luxembourg and Ireland.

Azerbaijan men's national basketball team roster
Players
Coaches

Pos.	No.	Name	Age – Date of birth	Height	Club	Ctr.
F/C	3	Emmanuel Agbason	16 – 16 October 2009	2.06 m (6 ft 9 in)	Sabah	(Azerbaijan)
SG	5	Wesley Van Beck	30 – 22 January 1996	1.93 m (6 ft 4 in)	Tenerife	(Spain)
PF	6	Akbar Mammadov	27 – 6 March 1999	2.03 m (6 ft 8 in)	Neftçi	(Azerbaijan)
F/C	7	Orhan Aydın	36 – 1 October 1989	2.03 m (6 ft 8 in)	Bandırma Kırmızı	(Turkey)
G/F	8	Ulaş Turgut	23 – 31 January 2003	2.00 m (6 ft 7 in)	Neftçi	(Azerbaijan)
G	10	Elshad Shirzadov	27 – 1 December 1998	1.90 m (6 ft 3 in)	NTD	(Azerbaijan)
G/F	11	Jabrayil Akbarov	24 – 9 February 2002	1.93 m (6 ft 4 in)	Serhedci	(Azerbaijan)
C	14	Amil Hamzayev	36 – 25 June 1990	2.03 m (6 ft 8 in)	Neftçi	(Azerbaijan)
PG	23	Kamran Mammadov	26 – 3 May 2000	1.85 m (6 ft 1 in)	Sabah	(Azerbaijan)
C	24	Ercan Donat	26 – 1 February 2000	2.08 m (6 ft 10 in)	Etimesgut	(Turkey)
SG	34	Derin Berköz	19 – 30 May 2007	1.90 m (6 ft 3 in)	Türk Telekom	(Turkey)
F	41	Endar Poladkhanli	27 – 12 October 1998	2.00 m (6 ft 7 in)	Sabah	(Azerbaijan)
PG	77	Shirzad Shirzadov	26 – 30 May 2000	1.88 m (6 ft 2 in)	Sabah	(Azerbaijan)

Head coach

- (Azerbaijan) Tahir Bakhshiyev

Assistant coach(es)

- (Azerbaijan) Anar Sariyev
- (Azerbaijan) Erhan Toker

Legend

- (C) Team captain
- Club – describes last
  club before the competition
- Age – describes age
  on 2 July 2026

=== Depth chart ===
Pos.	Starting 5	Bench 1	Bench 2
C	Orhan Aydın	Ercan Donat
PF	Amil Hamzayev	Emmanuel Agbason	Akbar Mammadov
SF	Ulaş Turgut	Endar Poladkhanli
SG	Wesley Van Beck	Jabrayil Akbarov	Derin Berköz
PG	Kamran Mammadov	Shirzad Shirzadov	Elshad Shirzadov

== Head coach position ==
- (Lithuania) Rimas Kurtinaitis – (2002–2006)
- (Azerbaijan) Elkhan Aliyev – (2008–2016)
- (Azerbaijan) Samit Nuruzade – (2016–2018)
- (Serbia) Aleksandar Trifunović – (2022)
- (Azerbaijan) Tahir Bakhshiyev – (2024–present)

== Past rosters ==
2022 FIBA European Championship for Small Countries: finished 4th among 6 teams

Azerbaijan men's national basketball team roster
Players
Coaches

Pos.	No.	Name	Age – Date of birth	Height	Club	Ctr.
F/C	8	Endar Poladkhanli	23 – 12 October 1998	2.00 m (6 ft 7 in)	Zirve Astara	(Azerbaijan)
F/C	9	Akbar Mammadov	23 – 6 March 1999	2.02 m (6 ft 8 in)	Zirve Astara	(Azerbaijan)
PF	10	Orhan Aydın	32 – 1 October 1989	2.03 m (6 ft 8 in)	Yalovaspor	(Turkey)
G	15	Elshad Shirzadov	23 – 1 December 1998	1.90 m (6 ft 3 in)	Unattached
G/F	17	Ulaş Turgut	19 – 31 January 2003	1.94 m (6 ft 4 in)	İstanbul	(Turkey)
PG	18	Beray Taşer	19 – 23 January 2003	1.90 m (6 ft 3 in)	Kağıtspor	(Turkey)
PG	20	Jordan Davis	25 – 6 June 1997	1.88 m (6 ft 2 in)	Murcia	(Spain)
PG	24	Shirzad Shirzadov	22 – 30 May 2000	1.88 m (6 ft 2 in)	Khirdalan	(Azerbaijan)
F	25	Anar Hajiyev	34 – 2 June 1988	2.00 m (6 ft 7 in)	Zirve Astara	(Azerbaijan)
G	27	Zaur Pashayev	38 – 31 August 1983	1.85 m (6 ft 1 in)	Zirve Astara	(Azerbaijan)
G	28	Jabrayil Akbarov	20 – 9 February 2002	1.93 m (6 ft 4 in)	Khirdalan	(Azerbaijan)
F/C	44	Amil Hamzayev	32 – 25 June 1990	2.03 m (6 ft 8 in)	Gence	(Azerbaijan)

Head coach

- (Serbia) Aleksandar Trifunović

Assistant coach(es)

- (Lithuania) Aurimas Jasilionis
- (Azerbaijan) Tahir Bakhshiyev

Legend

- (C) Team captain
- Club – describes last
  club before the competition
- Age – describes age
  on 29 June 2022

== See also ==
- Sport in Azerbaijan
- Azerbaijan women's national basketball team
- Azerbaijan men's national under-20 basketball team
- Azerbaijan men's national under-18 basketball team
- Azerbaijan men's national under-16 basketball team
