= Wesley Van Beck =

American-Azerbaijani basketball player (born 1996)

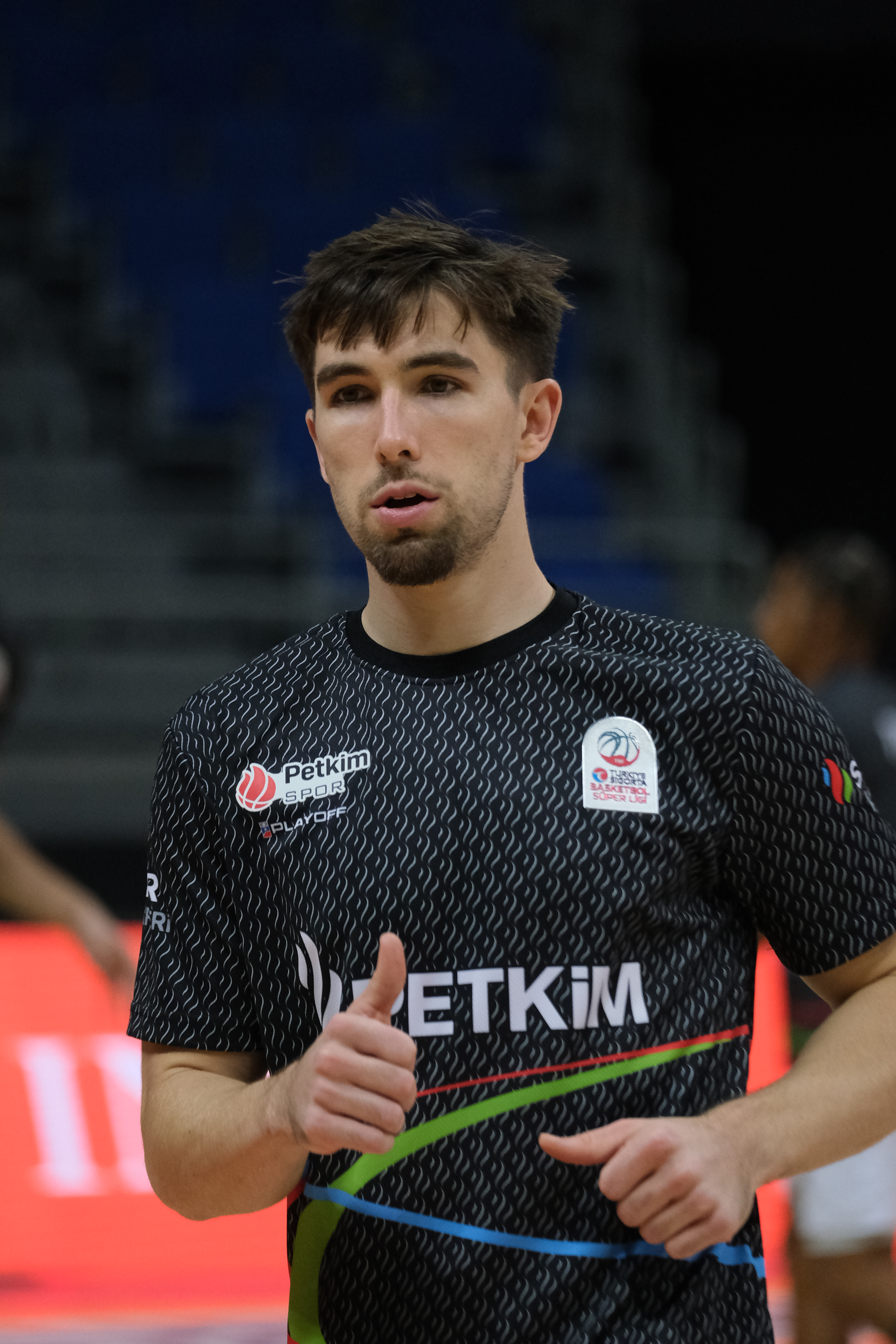
- Van Beck with Petkim Spor in 2024

No. 4 – La Laguna Tenerife
- Position: Shooting guard
- League: Liga ACB

Personal information
- Born: January 22, 1996 (age 30) Houston, Texas, U.S.
- Listed height: 1.93 m (6 ft 4 in)
- Listed weight: 88 kg (194 lb)

Career information
- High school: Westside (Houston, Texas)
- College: Houston (2014–2018)
- NBA draft: 2018: undrafted
- Playing career: 2018–present

Career history
- 2018–2019: South Bay Lakers
- 2020–2021: Tigrillos Medellín
- 2021–2022: Palmer Alma Mediterránea
- 2022–2023: BC Kalev
- 2023–2024: Niners Chemnitz
- 2024–2025: Petkim Spor
- 2025–present: La Laguna Tenerife

Career highlights
- FIBA Europe Cup champion (2024)

Wesley David Van Beck (born January 22, 1996) is an American-born naturalized Azerbaijani professional basketball player who plays for La Laguna Tenerife of the Spanish Liga ACB. Standing at 6 ft 4 in (1.93 m), Van Beck plays as a shooting guard.

== Early life and youth career ==
Born in Houston, Texas, Van Beck grew up in family with a basketball background. He played high school basketball for Westside High School in his hometown.

== College career ==
Van Beck played college basketball for the University of Houston of the NCAA between 2014 and 2018. He played 98 games over four seasons, averaging 5.5 points per game and 2.2 rebounds per game.

== Professional career ==
After finishing his college career, Van Beck signed for the South Bay Lakers of the NBA G League in 2018, appearing in 2 games for the Californians. In January 2020, he signed for Tigrillos Medellín of the Colombian basketball league, but he would miss most of the season due to an injury.

In October 2021, Van Beck made his way to Spain, signing for Palmer Alma Mediterránea of the LEB Oro. In July 2022, he signed for BC Kalev of the Estonian Korvpalli Meistriliiga and the FIBA Europe Cup.

In July 2023, Van Beck signed for Niners Chemnitz of the German Basketball Bundesliga. In December, he won the Bundesliga MVP award for the month. With Chemnitz, Van Beck won the 2023–24 FIBA Europe Cup.

In July 2024, he signed for Petkim Spor of the Turkish Basketbol Süper Ligi and the Basketball Champions League.

On July 15, 2025, he signed for La Laguna Tenerife of the Spanish Liga ACB and the Basketball Champions League.

== National team career ==
Van Beck received an Azerbaijani passport in November 2025. He made his debut for the Azerbaijan national team in a EuroBasket 2029 Pre-Qualifier game against North Macedonia on November 27, 2025.
