= Zakria Al-Husain =

Syrian basketball player

Zakria Alhusain
Al-Wathba
- Position: Shooting guard
- League: Syrian Basketball League

Personal information
- Born: January 1, 1991 (age 35) Homs, Syria
- Listed height: 187 cm (6 ft 2 in)

Zakria Alhusain (born 1 January 1991) is a Syrian professional basketball player. He plays for Al-Wathba of the Syrian Basketball League.
He is also a player of the Syrian national team.

Senior Syrian basketball from Al-Wathba Club.

Zakaria Al-Hussein is the top scorer in the first leg of the Syrian Basketball League.

He scored 34 points in one match in the Orontes.
