= Basketball at the 2002 West Asian Games =

Basketball

- Venue: Qadsia Hall
- Date: 4–9 April 2002

The Basketball competition was contested at the 2002 West Asian Games in Kuwait City, Kuwait from 4 to 9 April. All matches took place at Qadsia Hall.

== Results ==
Pos	Team	Pld	W	L	PF	PA	PD	Pts
1	Kuwait	4	3	1	324	318	+6	7
2	Qatar	4	2	2	324	315	+9	6
3	Syria	4	2	2	321	312	+9	6
4	United Arab Emirates	4	2	2	289	301	−12	6
5	Iran	4	1	3	311	323	−12	5

Source: Results

4 April
16:00

Iran	65–68	United Arab Emirates

Qadsia Hall, Kuwait City

4 April
18:00

Syria	72–79	Kuwait

Qadsia Hall, Kuwait City

5 April
17:00

United Arab Emirates	65–78	Syria

Qadsia Hall, Kuwait City

5 April
19:00

Qatar	76–88	Iran

Qadsia Hall, Kuwait City

6 April
16:00

United Arab Emirates	69–79	Qatar

Qadsia Hall, Kuwait City

6 April
18:00

Iran	66–69	Kuwait

Qadsia Hall, Kuwait City

8 April
16:00

United Arab Emirates	87–79	Kuwait

Qadsia Hall, Kuwait City

8 April
18:00

Syria	61–76	Qatar

Qadsia Hall, Kuwait City

9 April
16:00

Iran	92–110	Syria

Qadsia Hall, Kuwait City

9 April
18:00

Qatar	93–97	Kuwait

Qadsia Hall, Kuwait City
