= Basketball at the 2005 Islamic Solidarity Games =

Basketball competition

- Venue: Medina
- Dates: 9–19 April 2005

Basketball at the 2005 Islamic Solidarity Games was held in Medina from April 9 to April 19, 2005.

== Medalists ==
Event	Gold	Silver	Bronze
Men	Azerbaijan; Zaur Pashayev; Fuad Niftaliyev; Anar Sariyev; Emil Mirzayev; Namik Agayev; Tahir Bakhshiyev; Alexandr Rindin; Aleksey Kitayev; Anar Hajiyev; Farid Amirov	Algeria	Iran; Pouya Tajik; Saman Veisi; Mohammad Shahsavand; Amir Amini; Saeid Tabeshnia; Aidin Kabir; Mehdi Kamrani; Karam Ahmadian; Hamed Afagh; Hamed Sohrabnejad; Iman Zandi; Jaber Rouzbahani

== Preliminary round ==
=== Group A ===
Team	Pld	W	L	PF	PA	PD	Pts
Jordan	3	3	0	246	164	+82	6
Syria	3	2	1	222	194	+28	5
Kyrgyzstan	3	1	2	222	227	-5	4
Sudan	3	0	3	158	263	-105	3

April 9

Kyrgyzstan	55–80	Jordan

Al-Ansar Sports Club Court, Medina

April 10

Jordan	96–46	Sudan

Al-Ansar Sports Club Court, Medina

April 10

Syria	88–71	Kyrgyzstan

Al-Ansar Sports Club Court, Medina

April 11

Sudan	59–96	Kyrgyzstan

Al-Ansar Sports Club Court, Medina

April 12

Syria	71–53	Sudan

Al-Ansar Sports Club Court, Medina

April 13

Jordan	70–63	Syria

Al-Ansar Sports Club Court, Medina

=== Group B ===
Team	Pld	W	L	PF	PA	PD	Pts
Morocco	4	4	0	415	245	+170	8
Iran	4	3	1	466	230	+236	7
Chad	4	2	2	320	307	+13	6
Palestine	4	1	3	279	324	-45	5
Maldives	4	0	4	130	504	-374	4

April 9

Palestine	48–112	Iran

Al-Ansar Sports Club Court, Medina

April 9

Maldives	37–138	Morocco

Al-Ansar Sports Club Court, Medina

April 10

Iran	141–29	Maldives

Al-Ansar Sports Club Court, Medina

April 10

Morocco	79–60	Chad

Al-Ansar Sports Club Court, Medina

April 11

Maldives	40–117	Chad

Al-Ansar Sports Club Court, Medina

April 11

Morocco	107–58	Palestine

Al-Ansar Sports Club Court, Medina

April 12

Chad	62–123	Iran

Al-Ansar Sports Club Court, Medina

April 12

Maldives	24–108	Palestine

Al-Ansar Sports Club Court, Medina

April 13

Palestine	65–81	Chad

Al-Ansar Sports Club Court, Medina

April 13

Morocco	91–90	Iran

Al-Ansar Sports Club Court, Medina

=== Group C ===
Team	Pld	W	L	PF	PA	PD	Pts
Saudi Arabia	4	4	0	330	220	+110	8
Azerbaijan	4	3	1	294	197	+97	7
Kuwait	4	2	2	350	298	+52	6
Yemen	4	1	3	251	273	-22	5
Somalia	4	0	4	146	383	-237	4

April 9

Somalia	29–106	Azerbaijan

Prince Moh'd bin Abdul Aziz Court, Medina

April 9

Saudi Arabia	72–40	Yemen

Prince Moh'd bin Abdul Aziz Court, Medina

April 10

Saudi Arabia	65–58	Azerbaijan

Prince Moh'd bin Abdul Aziz Court, Medina

April 10

Kuwait	104–94	Yemen

Prince Moh'd bin Abdul Aziz Court, Medina

April 11

Kuwait	94–40	Somalia

Prince Moh'd bin Abdul Aziz Court, Medina

April 11

Azerbaijan	56–37	Yemen

Prince Moh'd bin Abdul Aziz Court, Medina

April 12

Saudi Arabia	103–36	Somalia

Prince Moh'd bin Abdul Aziz Court, Medina

April 12

Azerbaijan	74–66	Kuwait

Prince Moh'd bin Abdul Aziz Court, Medina

April 13

Yemen	80–41	Somalia

Prince Moh'd bin Abdul Aziz Court, Medina

April 13

Kuwait	86–90	Saudi Arabia

Prince Moh'd bin Abdul Aziz Court, Medina

=== Group D ===
Team	Pld	W	L	PF	PA	PD	Pts
Algeria	4	4	0	386	218	+168	8
Tunisia	4	3	1	375	189	+186	7
Libya	4	2	2	326	255	+71	6
Pakistan	4	1	3	201	397	-196	5
Tajikistan	4	0	4	172	401	-229	4

April 9

Tajikistan	55–111	Libya

Prince Moh'd bin Abdul Aziz Court, Medina

April 9

Pakistan	39–121	Tunisia

Prince Moh'd bin Abdul Aziz Court, Medina

April 10

Algeria	132–44	Pakistan

Prince Moh'd bin Abdul Aziz Court, Medina

April 10

Tunisia	75–52	Libya

Prince Moh'd bin Abdul Aziz Court, Medina

April 11

Tajikistan	38–104	Algeria

Prince Moh'd bin Abdul Aziz Court, Medina

April 11

Libya	93–45	Pakistan

Prince Moh'd bin Abdul Aziz Court, Medina

April 12

Algeria	80–70	Libya

Prince Moh'd bin Abdul Aziz Court, Medina

April 12

Tajikistan	28–113	Tunisia

Prince Moh'd bin Abdul Aziz Court, Medina

April 13

Pakistan	73–51	Tajikistan

Prince Moh'd bin Abdul Aziz Court, Medina

April 13

Tunisia	66–70	Algeria

Prince Moh'd bin Abdul Aziz Court, Medina

== Quarterfinals ==
=== Group I ===
Team	Pld	W	L	PF	PA	PD	Pts	Tiebreaker
Tunisia	3	2	1	179	160	+19	5	1-0
Iran	3	2	1	180	163	+17	5	0-1
Jordan	3	1	2	171	187	-16	4	1-0
Saudi Arabia	3	1	2	165	185	-20	4	0-1

April 14

Iran	66–52	Jordan

Prince Moh'd bin Abdul Aziz Court, Medina

April 14

Saudi Arabia	47–65	Tunisia

Prince Moh'd bin Abdul Aziz Court, Medina

April 15

Tunisia	62–69	Jordan

Prince Moh'd bin Abdul Aziz Court, Medina

April 15

Saudi Arabia	59–70	Iran

Prince Moh'd bin Abdul Aziz Court, Medina

April 16

Tunisia	52–44	Iran

Prince Moh'd bin Abdul Aziz Court, Medina

April 16

Saudi Arabia	59–50	Jordan

Prince Moh'd bin Abdul Aziz Court, Medina

=== Group II ===
Team	Pld	W	L	PF	PA	PD	Pts	Tiebreaker
Azerbaijan	3	2	1	232	206	+26	5	1-1 / 1.075
Algeria	3	2	1	217	206	+11	5	1-1 / 0.980
Morocco	3	2	1	184	189	-5	5	1-1 / 0.944
Syria	3	0	3	207	239	-32	3	

April 14

Syria	65–67	Morocco

Al-Ansar Sports Club Court, Medina

April 14

Algeria	79–74	Azerbaijan

Al-Ansar Sports Club Court, Medina

April 15

Morocco	55–70	Azerbaijan

Al-Ansar Sports Club Court, Medina

April 15

Syria	70–84	Algeria

Al-Ansar Sports Club Court, Medina

April 16

Algeria	54–62	Morocco

Al-Ansar Sports Club Court, Medina

April 16

Syria	72–88	Azerbaijan

Al-Ansar Sports Club Court, Medina

=== Group III ===
Team	Pld	W	L	PF	PA	PD	Pts	Tiebreaker
Palestine	3	2	1	232	228	+4	5	1-0
Kuwait	3	2	1	285	233	+52	5	0-1
Kyrgyzstan	3	1	2	205	225	-20	4	1-0
Pakistan	3	1	2	195	231	-36	4	0-1

April 14

Palestine	72–66	Kyrgyzstan

Prince Moh'd bin Abdul Aziz Court, Medina

April 14

Kuwait	99–66	Pakistan

Prince Moh'd bin Abdul Aziz Court, Medina

April 15

Kyrgyzstan	66–58	Pakistan

Prince Moh'd bin Abdul Aziz Court, Medina

April 15

Kuwait	91–94	Palestine

Prince Moh'd bin Abdul Aziz Court, Medina

April 16

Pakistan	71–66	Palestine

Prince Moh'd bin Abdul Aziz Court, Medina

April 16

Kuwait	95–73	Kyrgyzstan

Prince Moh'd bin Abdul Aziz Court, Medina

=== Group IV ===
Team	Pld	W	L	PF	PA	PD	Pts
Chad	3	3	0	219	153	+66	6
Libya	3	2	1	220	179	+41	5
Yemen	3	1	2	175	205	-30	4
Sudan	3	0	3	148	225	-77	3

April 14

Libya	79–48	Yemen

Al-Ansar Sports Club Court, Medina

April 14

Sudan	34–76	Chad

Al-Ansar Sports Club Court, Medina

April 15

Chad	68–61	Yemen

Al-Ansar Sports Club Court, Medina

April 15

Libya	83–56	Sudan

Al-Ansar Sports Club Court, Medina

April 16

Sudan	58–66	Yemen

Al-Ansar Sports Club Court, Medina

April 16

Libya	58–75	Chad

Al-Ansar Sports Club Court, Medina

== Classification ==
April 18

15th-16th

Pakistan	73–61	Sudan

Al-Ansar Sports Club Court, Medina

April 18

13th-14th

Kyrgyzstan	0–20	Yemen

Al-Ansar Sports Club Court, Medina

April 18

11th-12th

Kuwait	0–20	Libya

Al-Ansar Sports Club Court, Medina

April 18

9th-10th

Palestine	53–76	Chad

Al-Ansar Sports Club Court, Medina

April 18

7th-8th

Jordan	62–67	Syria

Al-Ansar Sports Club Court, Medina

April 18

5th-6th

Saudi Arabia	61–71	Morocco

Al-Ansar Sports Club Court, Medina

== Knockout round ==
Semifinals
April 18 - Medina
Tunisia	60
Algeria	65
April 18 - Medina
Azerbaijan	68
Iran	67

Final
April 19 - Medina
Algeria	69
Azerbaijan	82
Third place
April 19 - Medina
Tunisia	66
Iran	75

April 18

Semis

Tunisia	60–65	Algeria

Prince Moh'd bin Abdul Aziz Court, Medina

April 18

Semis

Azerbaijan	68–67	Iran

Prince Moh'd bin Abdul Aziz Court, Medina

April 19

Bronze

Tunisia	66–75	Iran

Prince Moh'd bin Abdul Aziz Court, Medina

April 19
19:30

Gold

Algeria	69–82	Azerbaijan
Scoring by quarter: 17-19, 16-22, 19-21, 17-20

Prince Moh'd bin Abdul Aziz Court, Medina

== Final rankings ==
#	Team	Record
Gold medal	Azerbaijan	7-2
Silver medal	Algeria	7-2
Bronze medal	Iran	6-3
4th	Tunisia	5-4
5th	Morocco	7-1
6th	Saudi Arabia	5-3
7th	Syria	3-4
8th	Jordan	4-3
9th	Chad	6-2
10th	Palestine	3-5
11th	Libya	5-3
12th	Kuwait	4-4
13th	Yemen	3-5
14th	Kyrgyzstan	2-5
15th	Pakistan	3-5
16th	Sudan	0-7
17th	Maldives	0-4
17th	Somalia	0-4
17th	Tajikistan	0-4
