= Basketball at the 2005 West Asian Games =

- Venue: Qatar SC Indoor Hall
- Date: 2–10 December 2005

Basketball was contested at the 2005 West Asian Games in Doha, Qatar from 2 December to 10 December. All events took place at Qatar SC Indoor Hall.

== Results ==
=== Preliminary round ===
Pos	Team	Pld	W	L	PF	PA	PD	Pts
1	Qatar	4	4	0	308	225	+83	8
2	Syria	4	3	1	340	272	+68	7
3	Jordan	4	2	2	304	268	+36	6
4	Kuwait	4	1	3	279	298	−19	5
5	Oman	4	0	4	174	342	−168	4

Source: Results

2 December
12:00

Kuwait	71–44	Oman

Qatar SC Indoor Hall, Doha

2 December
14:15

Qatar	73–71	Syria

Qatar SC Indoor Hall, Doha

3 December
12:00

Jordan	78–65	Kuwait

Qatar SC Indoor Hall, Doha

3 December
14:15

Syria	91–49	Oman

Qatar SC Indoor Hall, Doha

4 December
14:00

Syria	91–75	Jordan

Qatar SC Indoor Hall, Doha

4 December
16:15

Oman	35–80	Qatar

Qatar SC Indoor Hall, Doha

6 December
14:00

Jordan	100–46	Oman

Qatar SC Indoor Hall, Doha

6 December
16:15

Kuwait	68–89	Qatar

Qatar SC Indoor Hall, Doha

7 December
14:00

Kuwait	75–87	Syria

Qatar SC Indoor Hall, Doha

7 December
16:15

Qatar	66–51	Jordan

Qatar SC Indoor Hall, Doha

=== Final round ===
Semifinals
9 December
Qatar	95
Kuwait	70
9 December
Syria	99
Jordan	103

Final
10 December
Qatar	71
Jordan	57
Third place
10 December
Kuwait	95
Syria	98

==== Semifinals ====
9 December
12:00

Syria	99–103	Jordan

Qatar SC Indoor Hall, Doha

9 December
14:15

Qatar	95–70	Kuwait

Qatar SC Indoor Hall, Doha

==== Third place ====
10 December
10:00

Kuwait	95–98	Syria

Qatar SC Indoor Hall, Doha

==== Final ====
10 December
12:15

Qatar	71–57	Jordan

Qatar SC Indoor Hall, Doha
