= Basketball at the 2013 Islamic Solidarity Games =

Basketball competition

- Venue: GOR PSCC
- Dates: 15–20 September 2013

Basketball at the 2013 Islamic Solidarity Games will be held in GOR PSCC Palembang in Palembang from 15 September to 20 September 2013.

== Medalists ==
Event	Gold	Silver	Bronze
Men	Turkey; Cenk Şekeroğlu; Gökhan Yazıcıoğlu; Tuğberk Gedikli; Merthan Mutlu; Barış Ömer Erlim; Erdem İlter; Ediz İsmailoğlu; Genco Ozan Dilik; Hasan Sami Erdoğan; Emircan Koşut; Berk Demir; Uğur Can Aksoy	Palestine; Jamal Abu-Shamala; Sani Sakakini; Salim Sakakini; Nicola Fadayel; Ibrahim Habash; Ahmed Younis; Ahmed Yaser; Tareq Tamimi	Indonesia; Kelly Purwanto; Bonanza Siregar; Kaleb Ramot Gemilang; Ruslan; Ferdinand Damanik; Rachmad Febri Utomo; Adhi Pratama Prasetyo; Xaverius Prawiro; Andakara Prastawa; Galank Gunawan; Respati Pamungkas; Christian Ronaldo Sitepu
Women	Indonesia; Wulan Ayu Ningrum; Natasha Debby Christaline; Agustin Elya Gradita; Felicia Clarissa; Maharani Adhipuspitasari; Nur Rahmawati; Hanum Fasya; Jacklien Ibo; Marjorice Fedora Tsarine; Atty Juliani Achmad; Yuni Anggraeni; Shinta Ayu Ramadhani	Egypt; Nada Abdelhamid; Nesma Omar; Laila El-Kousy; Raneem El-Gedawy; Yasmina Gadalla; Nouralla Abdelalim; Farah Kandil; Ola El-Temsahi; Hams El-Manshawy; Noha Shetta; Farida Abdelnabi; Yasmin Saleh	Qatar; Amal Mohamed Awad; Salma Ihab; Refaa Morjan; Houweida Tounsi; Warda Morjan; Anwar Hussen; Munira Mahmoud; Yasmin Mohamed Koshkosh; Ghaliya Said; Alaa Soliman; Amal Mohamed Saleh; Mona Mohamed

== Medal table ==
Rank	Nation	Gold	Silver	Bronze	Total
1	Indonesia (INA)	1	0	1	2
2	Turkey (TUR)	1	0	0	1
3	Egypt (EGY)	0	1	0	1
3	Palestine (PLE)	0	1	0	1
5	Qatar (QAT)	0	0	1	1
Totals (5 entries)		2	2	2	6

== Men ==
Rank	Team	Pld	W	L	PF	PA	PD	Pts
1st place, gold medalist(s)	Turkey	4	4	0	327	233	+94	8
2nd place, silver medalist(s)	Palestine	4	3	1	284	277	+7	7
3rd place, bronze medalist(s)	Indonesia	4	2	2	192	207	−15	6
4	Kuwait	4	1	3	248	294	−46	5
5	Saudi Arabia	4	0	4	186	226	−40	3

15 September
14:00

Turkey	76–68	Saudi Arabia
Scoring by quarter: 15–18, 26–19, 12–21, 23–10

GOR PSCC, Palembang

15 September
18:00

Indonesia	66–68	Palestine
Scoring by quarter: 22–20, 14–19, 15–19, 15–10

GOR PSCC, Palembang

16 September
16:00

Palestine	76–67	Kuwait
Scoring by quarter: 13–25, 22–6, 18–22, 23–14

GOR PSCC, Palembang

16 September
18:00

Saudi Arabia	0–20	Indonesia
Forfeit

GOR PSCC, Palembang

17 September
18:00

Kuwait	63–93	Turkey
Scoring by quarter: 17–19, 25–19, 12–38, 9–17

GOR PSCC, Palembang

18 September
16:00

Saudi Arabia	65–72	Palestine
Scoring by quarter: 3–19, 19–6, 8–21, 35–26

GOR PSCC, Palembang

18 September
18:00

Turkey	79–34	Indonesia
Scoring by quarter: 16–16, 16–6, 23–2, 24–10

GOR PSCC, Palembang

19 September
16:00

Palestine	68–79	Turkey
Scoring by quarter: 14–15, 15–17, 30–24, 9–23

GOR PSCC, Palembang

19 September
18:00

Kuwait	58–53	Saudi Arabia
Scoring by quarter: 14–8, 18–8, 13–20, 13–17

GOR PSCC, Palembang

20 September
18:00

Indonesia	72–60	Kuwait
Scoring by quarter: 19–16, 21–6, 16–21, 16–17

GOR PSCC, Palembang

== Women ==
Rank	Team	Pld	W	L	PF	PA	PD	Pts
1st place, gold medalist(s)	Indonesia	4	4	0	330	209	+121	8
2nd place, silver medalist(s)	Egypt	4	2	2	317	271	+46	6
3rd place, bronze medalist(s)	Qatar	4	0	4	185	352	−167	4

15 September
16:00

Indonesia	88–45	Qatar
Scoring by quarter: 25–9, 24–16, 15–7, 24–13

GOR PSCC, Palembang

16 September
14:00

Qatar	49–88	Egypt
Scoring by quarter: 12–25, 16–19, 19–16, 2–28

GOR PSCC, Palembang

17 September
16:00

Egypt	69–78	Indonesia
Scoring by quarter: 15–20, 18–21, 21–18, 15–19

GOR PSCC, Palembang

18 September
14:00

Indonesia	83–28	Qatar
Scoring by quarter: 26–9, 23–9, 18–8, 16–2

GOR PSCC, Palembang

19 September
14:00

Qatar	63–93	Egypt
Scoring by quarter: 12–20, 19–20, 15–25, 17–28

GOR PSCC, Palembang

20 September
16:00

Indonesia	81–67	Egypt
Scoring by quarter: 25–21, 23–11, 20–13, 13–22

GOR PSCC, Palembang
