= Tajikistan men's national basketball team =

Tajikistan
- FIBA ranking: NR (1 September 2026)
- Joined FIBA: 1994
- FIBA zone: FIBA Asia
- National federation: Basketball Federation of Republic Tajikistan

Olympic Games
- Appearances: None

FIBA World Cup
- Appearances: None

FIBA Asia Cup
- Appearances: None
Home	Away

The Tajikistan men's national basketball team (Tajik: Тими миллии мардонаи баскетболбозони Тоҷикистон) represents Tajikistan in international basketball and is controlled by the Tajikistan Basketball Federation, the governing body of basketball in Tajikistan.

== History ==
Back in the Soviet era, Pamir Dushanbe participated in Soviet Basketball League Competitions, Tajik SSR national team participated in Spartakiads, Boris Sokolovsky played for both of these teams. Tajik SSR-born Dmitri Sukharev was a member of the Unified Team national basketball team at the 1992 Summer Olympic Games.

Despite its active Soviet past, the Tajikistan national team currently remains inactive and the only international tournament that the team participated in was the 2005 Islamic Solidarity Games.

== Competitions ==
Year	Rank	Pld	W	L
(Saudi Arabia) 2005	Group stage	4	0	4

=== FIBA Asia Cup ===
Year	Rank	P	W	L
1960 to 1991	Part of Soviet Union			
(Indonesia) 1993	Not a FIBA member			
(South Korea) 1995	Did not enter			
(Saudi Arabia) 1997	Did not enter			
(Japan) 1999	Did not enter			
(China) 2001	Did not enter			
(China) 2003	Did not enter			
(Qatar) 2005	Did not enter			
(Japan) 2007	Did not enter			
(China) 2009	Did not enter			
(China) 2011	Did not enter			
(Philippines) 2013	Did not enter			
(China) 2015	Did not enter			
(Lebanon) 2017	Did not enter			
(Indonesia) 2022	Did not enter			
(Saudi Arabia) 2025	Did not enter			
2029	Did not enter			
Total	0/32	0	0	0
