= Orhan Aydın =

Azerbaijani basketball player (born 1989)

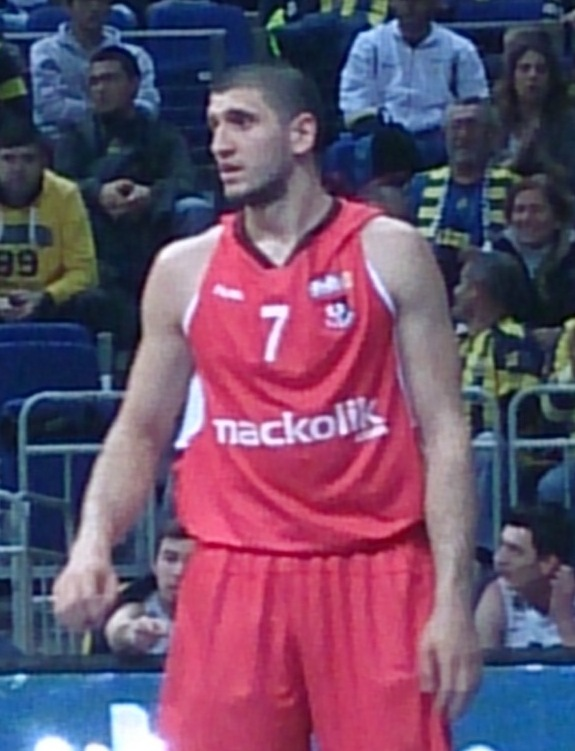
- Hacıyev with Uşak Sportif

Sabah BC
- Position: Power forward
- League: ABL

Personal information
- Born: October 1, 1989 (age 37) Baku, Azerbaijan
- Listed height: 2.03 m (6 ft 8 in)
- Listed weight: 105 kg (231 lb)

Career information
- NBA draft: 2011: undrafted
- Playing career: 2005–present

Career history
- 2005–2009: Pertevniyal
- 2009–2010: Darüşşafaka
- 2010: Pertevniyal
- 2010–2011: Türk Telekom
- 2011–2013: Aliağa Petkim
- 2013–2015: Uşak Sportif
- 2015–2016: Acıbadem Üniversitesi
- 2016–2017: Galatasaray
- 2017–2022: Gaziantep
- 2022–2024: Yalovaspor
- 2024–2025: ITÜ
- 2025–2026: Bandırma Bordo
- 2026–present: Sabah BC
Medals
Men's basketball
Representing Azerbaijan
Islamic Solidarity Games
Gold medal – first place	2017 Baku	3x3 basketball
Silver medal – second place	2021 Konya	3x3 basketball

Orhan Aydın Hacıyev (born 1 October 1989) is an Azerbaijani professional basketball player for Sabah BC of the Azerbaijan Basketball League (ABL). He is 2.03 m (6'8") tall, and plays the power forward position. Hacıyev is member of Azerbaijan national basketball team, but also holds Turkish citizenship.
