= Lis Shoshi =

Kosovan basketball player

No. 1 – Ylli
- Position: Center
- League: Kosovo Basketball Superleague

Personal information
- Born: June 29, 1994 (age 32) Peja, FR Yugoslavia
- Listed height: 2.11 m (6 ft 11 in)
- Listed weight: 102 kg (225 lb)

Career information
- College: Howard College (2013–2015); Little Rock (2015–2017)
- NBA draft: 2017: undrafted
- Playing career: 2012–present

Career history
- 2012–2013: Besa
- 2017–2018: Sigal Prishtina
- 2018: Pieno žvaigždės
- 2018–2019: Maccabi Ashdod
- 2019: s.Oliver Würzburg
- 2020: Peja
- 2021: Maccabi Rishon LeZion
- 2023–2024: Peja
- 2024–present: Ylli

Career highlights
- Baltic League champion (2018)

Lis Shoshi (born June 29, 1994) is a Kosovan professional basketball player for Golden Eagle Ylli of the Kosovo Basketball Superleague. He played college basketball for Howard College and University of Arkansas at Little Rock before playing professionally in Kosovo, Lithuania, and Israel.

== College career ==
Shoshi played two seasons under head coach Scott Raines at Howard College, where he was named the Western Junior College Athletic Conference Defensive Player of the Year and Honorable Mention All-WJCAC in 2015.

In his senior year at Little Rock, Shoshi averaged 8.9 points and a team-high 6.4 rebounds and 1.5 blocks per game. He led the Sun Belt Conference in blocks per game and his rebounding average ranked ninth in the Sun Belt.

== Professional career ==
=== 2017–18 season ===
On August 28, 2017, Shoshi signed with Sigal Prishtina of the Kosovo Basketball League. However, on January 5, 2018, Shoshi parted ways with Sigal Prishtina to join the Lithuanian team Pieno žvaigždės for the rest of the season. On April 21, 2018, Shoshi recorded a season-high 20 points, shooting 9-of-12 from the field, along with five rebounds in an 85–94 loss to Lietkabelis. Shoshi went on to win the 2018 Baltic League Championship with Pieno žvaigždės.

=== 2018–19 season ===
On July 17, 2018, Shoshi signed with the Israeli team Maccabi Ashdod for the 2018–19 season, joining his national team coach Brad Greenberg. On February 2, 2019, Shoshi recorded a double-double with a career-high 30 points and 10 rebounds, while shooting 10-of-16 from the field for 33 PIR in a 94–104 loss to Hapoel Jerusalem. In 30 games played for Ashdod, he finished the season as the league fourth-leading rebounder with 7.7 per game, to go with 12.8 points and 1.1 blocks per game.

=== 2019–20 season ===
On June 14, 2019, Shoshi signed a one-year deal with the German team s.Oliver Würzburg.

On August 12, 2019, he parted ways with Würzburg after he suffered a shoulder injury.

=== 2020–21 season ===
On March 16, 2021, he has signed with Peja in the Kosovo Basketball League. Shoshi averaged 14.3 points, 9.1 rebounds, and 2.2 assists per game en route to Peja winning the league title and placing as runner up in the postseason, losing the Cup final.

=== 2021–22 season ===
On September 16, 2021, Shoshi signed with Maccabi Rishon LeZion in the Israeli Basketball Premier League.

== National team career ==
Shoshi is a member of the Kosovo national basketball team. He participated in the 2019 FIBA World Cup qualification games.
