= 2031 FIBA Basketball World Cup =

International basketball competition

Coupe du monde de basketball 2031

Tournament details
- Host country: France
- Dates: 29 August – 14 September
- Teams: 32 (from 4 confederations)
- Venues: 5 (in 3 host cities)

The 2031 FIBA Basketball World Cup will be the 21st FIBA Basketball World Cup, the quadrennial international basketball championship contested by the men's national teams of FIBA. The tournament will be hosted in France from 29 August to 14 September 2031.

It will be the first FIBA Basketball World Cup to be held in the country and the first since the 2014 tournament in Spain to be held in Europe.

The tournament will serve as qualification for the 2032 Summer Olympics, where the top two teams from each of the Americas and Europe, and the top team from each of Africa, Asia, and Oceania, will qualify alongside the tournament's host Australia.

== Host selection ==
Five countries expressed interest in bidding for the tournament:

- Australia – Basketball Australia confirmed in early September 2023 that it was undergoing discussions with FIBA on potentially hosting the tournament. In an article published by the Herald Sun, it was revealed that Melbourne would host key games should the bid become successful. The country hosted the 2022 FIBA Women's Basketball World Cup in Sydney and will host the 2032 Summer Olympics in Brisbane.
- France – France's initial interest in bidding came in January 2025. French Federation of Basketball Jean-Pierre Hunckle confirmed to sports newspaper L'Équipe in late August 2025 that the FFBB had plans to bid for the 2031 tournament, citing recent success of the 2024 Summer Olympics in Paris. The country hosted one of the 2026 FIBA Women's Basketball World Cup Qualifying Tournaments in Lyon and will host the 2030 Winter Olympics in the French Alps.
- Italy – In December 2023, the Italian Basketball Federation held talks with the Italian government on the possibility of bidding to host the World Cup. The country hosted EuroBasket 2022 and the 2026 Winter Olympics, both in Milan, as well one of the 2016 FIBA Olympic Qualifying Tournaments in Turin.
- Mexico – In September 2025, after a FIBA Americas meeting held in Mexico City, the Mexican Sports Basketball Association expressed their interest in hosting the event to FIBA officials. The Mexicans also plan to bid for the 2029 FIBA AmeriCup as a potential precursor to the World Cup. The country previously hosted recent under-age basketball championships, such as the 2024 FIBA Under-17 Women's Basketball World Cup.
- Poland – In September 2025, the Polish Basketball Association announced its intention to host the tournament. Poland previously hosted the EuroBasket 2025 in Katowice. It was also host the 2026 FIBA 3×3 World Cup in Warsaw. It is also bidding to host the 2040 or 2044 Summer Olympics.

During its Central Board meeting on 22 April 2026 in Berlin, Germany, FIBA announced that France will host the 2031 edition of the World Cup.

== Qualification ==
=== Qualified teams ===
As hosts, France automatically qualified for the tournament.

Team	Qualification method	Date of qualification	Appearance(s)				Previous best performance (Note: Bold text indicates they hosted that edition.)	WR (Note: World ranking at start of tournament.)
Team	Qualification method	Date of qualification	Total	First	Last	Streak	Previous best performance	WR
France	Host nation	22 April 2026	10th / 11th	1950	2023	7/1	Third place (2014, 2019)	TBD

== Venues ==
A day after the announcement of France's hosting of the World Cup, the French Federation of Basketball revealed five venues for the tournament across three cities. Three venues within Paris were reportedly chosen: The Plenitude Arena in Nanterre, the Accor Arena in Bercy, and the Adidas Arena in La Chapelle. One venue in each of Lille and Lyon were also selected: the Stade Pierre-Mauroy in Lille and the LDLC Arena in Lyon.

Four of the five venues held events during the 2024 Summer Olympics, with the Accor Arena and Stade Pierre-Mauroy hosting the 5x5 basketball competitions, the La Défense Arena staging pool swimming and the final phase of the water polo event, and the Adidas Arena holding the badminton tournaments and rhythmic gymnastics competitions. The Accor Arena also held artistic gymnastics events, and the Stade Pierre-Mauroy also hosted the final phase for handball.

The Accor Arena hosted EuroBasket 1999 and was initially set to host games of EuroBasket Women 2021 before a venue change was enacted, while the Adidas Arena is the home arena of Paris Basketball of the LNB Élite. The Paris La Défense Arena will reportedly have a 35,000-capacity configuration for the tournament and is poised to host the tournament's final phase, including the World Cup final. Meanwhile, the Stade Pierre-Mauroy, which holds an indoor capacity of up to 30,000 in its Boîte à Spectacles configuration, hosted the EuroBasket 2015 final phase, while the LDLC Arena is the home venue of ASVEL Basket of the LNB Élite.

Lille	2031 FIBA Basketball World Cup (France)	
Stade Pierre-Mauroy	2031 FIBA Basketball World Cup (France)	
Capacity: 30,000	2031 FIBA Basketball World Cup (France)	
Lyon	2031 FIBA Basketball World Cup (France)	
LDLC Arena	2031 FIBA Basketball World Cup (France)	
Capacity: 12,523	2031 FIBA Basketball World Cup (France)	
Paris
Nanterre	Bercy	La Chapelle
Plenitude Arena	Accor Arena	Adidas Arena
Capacity: 35,000	Capacity: 15,609	Capacity: 8,000

== Format ==
Like in the past three editions, the tournament will be played in three phases – the group stage, the second round, and the final phase. In the group stage, the 32 qualified teams will be sorted into eight groups of four (A–H), where every team in a group will play each other once. The top two teams from each group will then advance to the second round. The bottom two teams will then play two classification games to determine the 17th to 32nd rankings. In the second round, there will be four groups (I–L) of four made up of the teams that advanced from the first round, again playing each other once. The top two teams from groups I to L will qualify for the final phase. The teams that lost in the quarter-finals will then play classification games to determine the 5th to 8th rankings.

== See also ==
- 2030 FIBA Women's Basketball World Cup
