= 2027 FIBA Basketball World Cup qualification (Europe) =

2027 FIBA Basketball World Cup
European Qualifiers

Tournament details
- Dates: 19 February 2024 – March 2027
- Teams: 42

Official website
- European qualifiers website European pre-qualifiers website

The 2027 FIBA Basketball World Cup qualification for the FIBA Europe region, began in February 2024 and will conclude in March 2027. The process will determine the twelve teams that will qualify for the 2027 FIBA World Cup.

== Format ==
FIBA Europe will be allocated 12 berths at the World Cup. In total, 42 FIBA Europe teams will take part in the qualification process. The qualification will consist of the following stages:

- Pre-qualifiers
  - First round: Eight teams (plus entrants Armenia and Azerbaijan) that were eliminated from the EuroBasket 2025 pre-qualifiers took part. Four teams advanced to the second round.
  - Second round: The four teams that advanced from the previous round will be joined by the eight teams that were eliminated from the EuroBasket 2025 qualifiers. Eight teams will advance to the qualifiers.
- Qualifiers
  - First round: 24 teams that qualified for EuroBasket 2025 and eight teams that advanced from the pre-qualifiers will be organized into eight groups of four. The top three teams of each group will qualify for the second round.
  - Second round: The top 24 teams from the first round will be organised into four groups of six, with results carried over from the first round. The top three teams of each group will qualify for the World Cup.

== Pre-qualifiers ==
=== First round ===
The first round was contested between teams that did not participate in the EuroBasket 2025 qualifiers. Armenia made their second appearance in World Cup qualification, while Azerbaijan made their debut.

The ten participating nations were sorted into three groups. Group A contained four teams, while Groups B and C included three teams each. Each team played the other teams in its group in home and away games in a round robin system. Four teams in total – the three group winners plus the best ranked second placed team across all groups – advanced to the Second round. The other six teams were eliminated.

==== Draw ====
The draw took place on 8 August 2023 in Munich.

===== Seeding =====
The seeding was based on the FIBA World Ranking of 27 February 2023.

Seed 1
Team	Pos
Romania	57
Switzerland	58
Austria	63

Seed 2
Team	Pos
Luxembourg	77
Kosovo	80
Armenia	87

Seed 3
Team	Pos
Norway	93
Ireland	96
Albania	100

Seed 4
Team	Pos
Azerbaijan	113

==== Groups ====
All times are local.

===== Group A =====
Pos	Team	Pld	W	L	PF	PA	PD	Pts	Qualification
1	Switzerland	6	6	0	484	341	+143	12	Second round
2	Ireland	6	3	3	454	470	−16	9	
3	Kosovo	6	2	4	442	489	−47	8	
4	Azerbaijan	6	1	5	405	485	−80	7	

Source: FIBA
Rules for classification: 1) Points; 2) Head-to-head; 3) Points difference; 4) Points scored.

22 February 2024	Switzerland	72–53	Azerbaijan	Fribourg
19:00	Scoring by quarter: 10–20, 19–8, 21–15, 22–10
	Pts: Fofana 19; Rebs: Nzege 10; Asts: Fofana, Zinn 5	Report	Pts: LeDay 22; Rebs: Donat, Leday 6 Asts: K. Mammadov 4	Arena: Site Sportif Saint-Léonard; Attendance: 1,150; Referees: Stylianos Simeonidis (GRE), Joaquin García (ESP), Alessandro Perciavalle (ITA)

22 February 2024	Kosovo	83–76	Ireland	Pristina
19:00	Scoring by quarter: 22–17, 23–21, 20–19, 18–19
	Pts: Hajrizi 20; Rebs: Hajrizi 9 Asts: Tmušić 6	Report	Pts: Blount 27; Rebs: Blount 13; Asts: Badmus 4	Arena: Palace of Youth and Sports; Attendance: 2,500; Referees: Ali Şakacı (TUR), Jan Baloun (CZE), Edgard Ceccarelli (FRA)

25 February 2024	Azerbaijan	87–77	Kosovo	Baku
14:00	Scoring by quarter: 19–19, 24–25, 16–16, 28–17
	Pts: Aydın 27; Rebs: Hall 14; Asts: S. Shirzadov 6	Report	Pts: Berisha 20; Rebs: Kapiti 6 Asts: Mala 6	Arena: Sarkhadchi Sport Center; Attendance: 2,400; Referees: Andžej Urbanovič (LTU), Ritvars Helmšteins (LAT), Viktor Nagy (HUN)

25 February 2024	Ireland	63–86	Switzerland	Dublin
15:00	Scoring by quarter: 14–22, 14–19, 14–22, 20–23
	Pts: Flood 15; Rebs: Buivydas 7 Asts: Blount 4	Report	Pts: Anabir 15; Rebs: Jurkovitz 8 Asts: Fofana 6	Arena: National Basketball Arena; Attendance: 1,500; Referees: Valerio Grigioni (ITA), Javier Torres (ESP), Chess Van Looy (BEL)

21 November 2024	Ireland	91–67	Azerbaijan	Dublin
17:00	Scoring by quarter: 25–12, 23–13, 23–20, 20–22
	Pts: Flood 28; Rebs: Blount 12; Asts: Blount 9	Report	Pts: Davis 25; Rebs: Aydın, Davis 8 Asts: Aydın 4	Arena: National Basketball Arena; Attendance: 900; Referees: Iain MacDonald (GBR), Ioannis Tsimpouris (GRE), Davíð Tómasson (ISL)

21 November 2024	Switzerland	75–43	Kosovo	Bern
19:30	Scoring by quarter: 14–12, 22–6, 20–22, 19–3
	Pts: Mbala 15; Rebs: Mbala 12; Asts: Fofana, Kazadi 4	Report	Pts: Tmušić 9 Rebs: Morina 8 Asts: Morina 4	Arena: Mobiliar Arena; Attendance: 585; Referees: Joaquin García (ESP), Łukasz Jankowski (POL), Domen Krajnc (SLO)

24 November 2024	Azerbaijan	55–85	Switzerland	Baku
14:00	Scoring by quarter: 20–15, 15–22, 8–24, 12–24
	Pts: Aydın 15; Rebs: Aydın 12; Asts: K. Mammadov 5	Report	Pts: Rocak 19; Rebs: Granvorka 7 Asts: Fofana 11	Arena: Baku Sports Palace; Attendance: 1,300; Referees: Tolga Edis (TUR), Kirile Tvauri (GEO), Vlad-Theodor Cotrobas-Dascalu (ROU)

24 November 2024	Ireland	91–85	Kosovo	Dublin
17:00	Scoring by quarter: 24–12, 18–25, 31–21, 18–27
	Pts: N. Quinn 23; Rebs: N. Quinn 10; Asts: Blount 8	Report	Pts: Berisha 15; Rebs: Ukaj 8 Asts: Armstead 9	Arena: National Basketball Arena; Attendance: 1,800; Referees: Ritvars Helmšteins (LAT), Martin Van Hoye (BEL), Alexandre Maret (FRA)

20 February 2025	Kosovo	81–79	Azerbaijan	Pristina
19:30	Scoring by quarter: 20–21, 23–20, 17–18, 21–20
	Pts: Tmušić 21; Rebs: four players 5 Asts: Myles 6	Report	Pts: Hall 21; Rebs: Hall 16; Asts: K. Mammadov, Turgut 5	Arena: Palace of Youth and Sports; Attendance: 1,000; Referees: Stylianos Simeonidis (GRE), Mehmet Şahin (TUR), Mladen Lučić (MNE)

20 February 2025	Switzerland	85–54	Ireland	Fribourg
19:30	Scoring by quarter: 30–16, 18–15, 19–9, 18–14
	Pts: Mbala 19; Rebs: three players 5 Asts: Fofana 10	Report	Pts: N. Quinn 18; Rebs: N. Quinn 9 Asts: Flood 3	Arena: Site Sportif Saint-Léonard; Attendance: 3,000; Referees: Alessandro Perciavalle (ITA), Arnau Padros (ESP), Ioannis Agrafiotis (GRE)

23 February 2025	Azerbaijan	64–79	Ireland	Baku
17:00	Scoring by quarter: 16–21, 14–20, 19–13, 15–25
	Pts: S. Shirzadov 14; Rebs: Hall 12; Asts: K. Mammadov 4	Report	Pts: Flood 23; Rebs: N. Quinn 9 Asts: Flood 5	Arena: Baku Sports Palace; Attendance: 700; Referees: Zdravko Rutešić (MNE), Duhan Köyiçi (TUR), Nemanja Vlahović (SRB)

23 February 2025	Kosovo	73–81	Switzerland	Pristina
19:30	Scoring by quarter: 14–23, 16–23, 15–13, 28–22
	Pts: Berisha 20; Rebs: Kapiti 11; Asts: Myles 4	Report	Pts: Ducommun 21; Rebs: Granvorka 10; Asts: George 5	Arena: Palace of Youth and Sports; Attendance: 2,500; Referees: Edgard Ceccarelli (FRA), Polat Parlak (TUR), Jan Baloun (CZE)

===== Group B =====
Pos	Team	Pld	W	L	PF	PA	PD	Pts	Qualification
1	Romania	4	3	1	316	287	+29	7	Second round
2	Norway	4	2	2	273	277	−4	6	Second round
3	Luxembourg	4	1	3	271	296	−25	5	

Source: FIBA
Rules for classification: 1) Points; 2) Head-to-head; 3) Points difference; 4) Points scored.

22 February 2024	Romania	72–76(OT)	Luxembourg	Cluj-Napoca
19:00	Scoring by quarter: 20–17, 19–10, 16–11, 12–29, Overtime: 5–9
	Pts: Cățe 25; Rebs: Girbea 11; Asts: Tohătan 5	Report	Pts: Kovac, Logelin 15; Rebs: Rugg, Vujaković 9 Asts: Kreps 3	Arena: BTarena; Attendance: 3,050; Referees: Mehmet Şahin (TUR), Nemanja Ninković (SRB), Josip Mikulić (CRO)

25 February 2024	Luxembourg	58–72	Norway	Luxembourg City
17:00	Scoring by quarter: 9–24, 23–19, 20–8, 6–21
	Pts: Rugg 22; Rebs: Vujaković 10; Asts: Rugg 3	Report	Pts: Frey 23; Rebs: Berg 16; Asts: Frey 6	Arena: d'Coque; Attendance: 1,800; Referees: Łukasz Jankowski (POL), Armin Mutapcic (GER), Martin Van Hoye (BEL)

21 November 2024	Norway	62–75	Romania	Oslo
19:00	Scoring by quarter: 20–26, 18–17, 12–12, 12–20
	Pts: Frey 21; Rebs: Ndow 11; Asts: Frey 5	Report	Pts: Olah 16; Rebs: Cățe 13; Asts: Tohătan 5	Arena: Nordstrand Arena; Attendance: 2,200; Referees: Elvis Binders-Čoders (LAT), Jan Baloun (CZE), Karol Kowalski (POL)

24 November 2024	Luxembourg	78–84	Romania	Luxembourg City
17:00	Scoring by quarter: 12–23, 19–23, 18–19, 29–19
	Pts: Kovac 23; Rebs: Rugg 6 Asts: Kovac 4	Report	Pts: Richard 26; Rebs: Cățe 16; Asts: Tohătan 4	Arena: d'Coque; Attendance: 1,500; Referees: Edgard Ceccarelli (FRA), Tijmen Last (NED), Hrvoje Čavar (BIH)

20 February 2025	Norway	68–59	Luxembourg	Oslo
19:00	Scoring by quarter: 15–21, 15–17, 22–8, 16–13
	Pts: Frey 27; Rebs: Ndow 9 Asts: Frey 4	Report	Pts: Vujaković 12; Rebs: Rugg 11; Asts: four players 2	Arena: Nordstrand Arena; Attendance: 2,000; Referees: Joaquin García (ESP), Ritvars Helmšteins (LAT), Rainis Värv (EST)

23 February 2025	Romania	85–71	Norway	Oradea
19:00	Scoring by quarter: 23–22, 18–20, 22–15, 22–14
	Pts: Grasu, Richard 14; Rebs: Cățe 6 Asts: Cățe 6	Report	Pts: Ndow 19; Rebs: Ndow, Nordheim 6 Asts: four players 3	Arena: Oradea Arena; Attendance: 2,397; Referees: Nemanja Ninković (SRB), Tolga Edis (TUR), Kirile Tvauri (GEO)

===== Group C =====
Pos	Team	Pld	W	L	PF	PA	PD	Pts	Qualification
1	Austria	4	3	1	401	312	+89	7	Second round
2	Armenia	4	2	2	346	384	−38	6	
3	Albania	4	1	3	290	341	−51	5	

Source: FIBA
Rules for classification: 1) Points; 2) Head-to-head; 3) Points difference; 4) Points scored.

22 February 2024	Austria	106–91	Armenia	Vienna
19:15	Scoring by quarter: 23–29, 31–19, 25–20, 27–23
	Pts: Mahalbašić 27; Rebs: Mahalbašić 8 Asts: Diggs 5	Report	Pts: Jones 30; Rebs: Tavitian 7 Asts: Jones 8	Arena: Hallmann-Dome; Attendance: 1,300; Referees: Zdravko Rutešić (MNE), Christian Theis (GER), Hrvoje Čavar (BIH)

25 February 2024	Armenia	84–79	Albania	Yerevan
18:00	Scoring by quarter: 24–23, 24–19, 14–17, 22–20
	Pts: Spight 31; Rebs: Tavitian 8 Asts: Jones 11	Report	Pts: Lekndreaj 19; Rebs: Lilaj 10; Asts: Lekndreaj 5	Arena: Karen Demirchyan Complex; Attendance: 3,000; Referees: Ciprian Stoica (ROU), Zoran Mitrovski (MKD), Emmouil Tsolakos (GRE)

21 November 2024	Albania	63–99	Austria	Durrës
19:30	Scoring by quarter: 18–27, 17–23, 12–32, 16–17
	Pts: Hamati 16; Rebs: Hamati 6 Asts: Dusha 4	Report	Pts: Landesberg 23; Rebs: Brajkovic 7 Asts: Vujošević 4	Arena: Dhimitraq Goga Sports Palace; Attendance: 250; Referees: Arnau Padros (ESP), Valerio Grigioni (ITA), Ioannis Agrafiotis (GRE)

24 November 2024	Armenia	80–129	Austria	Yerevan
18:00	Scoring by quarter: 22–39, 6–29, 25–36, 27–25
	Pts: Jones 22; Rebs: Chizhenok 5 Asts: Jones 7	Report	Pts: Landesberg 25; Rebs: Schott 12; Asts: Vujošević 11	Arena: Karen Demirchyan Complex; Attendance: 5,000; Referees: Nemanja Ninković (SRB), Ciprian Stoica (ROU), Stylianos Simeonidis (GRE)

20 February 2025	Albania	70–91	Armenia	Durrës
19:00	Scoring by quarter: 17–22, 16–25, 22–22, 15–22
	Pts: Lekndreaj 17; Rebs: Tola 8 Asts: Hysa 6	Report	Pts: Jones 34; Rebs: Tatevosyan 7 Asts: Jones 10	Arena: Dhimitraq Goga Sports Palace; Attendance: 250; Referees: Ioannis Tsimpouris (GRE), Hrvoje Čavar (BIH), Domen Krajnc (SLO)

23 February 2025	Austria	67–78	Albania	Schwechat
16:00	Scoring by quarter: 16–19, 15–16, 17–22, 19–21
	Pts: Suljanovic 11; Rebs: Brajkovic 9 Asts: Hahn 6	Report	Pts: Hysa 17; Rebs: Tola 7 Asts: Hysa, Topalli 5	Arena: Multiversum; Attendance: 1,500; Referees: Branimir Galić (CRO), Viktor Nagy (HUN), Elvis Binders-Čoders (LAT)

==== Ranking of second-placed teams ====
Matches against the fourth-placed team in Group A are not included in this ranking.

Pos	Grp	Team	Pld	W	L	PF	PA	PD	Pts	Qualification
1	B	Norway	4	2	2	273	277	−4	6	Second round
2	C	Armenia	4	2	2	346	384	−38	6	
3	A	Ireland	4	1	3	284	339	−55	5	

Updated to match(es) played on 20 February 2025. Source: FIBA
Rules for classification: 1) Points; 2) Head-to-head; 3) Points difference; 4) Points scored.

=== Second round ===
The four teams that advanced from the previous round will be joined by the eight teams that were eliminated from the EuroBasket 2025 qualifiers. Those twelve teams will be placed into four groups with three teams each. Each group will be formed by one team that advanced from the first round, and two last placed finishers from EuroBasket 2025 qualifiers. Each team will play the other teams in its group in home and away games in a round robin system. The two top-ranked teams from each group (eight teams in total) will advance to the Qualifiers. This round will be played in the Summer of 2025.

==== Teams ====
Entrance/qualification method	Team(s)
Advanced from First round	Austria; Norway; Romania; Switzerland
Eliminated from EuroBasket 2025 qualifiers	Bulgaria; Croatia; Denmark; Hungary; North Macedonia; Netherlands; Slovakia; Ukraine

==== Draw ====
The draw took place on 14 March 2025 in Mies.

===== Seeding =====
The seeding was based on the FIBA World Ranking of 25 February 2025.

Seed 1
Team	Pos
Croatia	32
Ukraine	38
Hungary	44
Bulgaria	46

Seed 2
Team	Pos
Netherlands	54
North Macedonia	58
Denmark	59
Slovakia	60

Seed 3
Team	Pos
Switzerland	62
Romania	64
Austria	67
Norway	77

==== Groups ====
All times are local.

===== Group D =====
Pos	Team	Pld	W	L	PF	PA	PD	Pts	Qualification
1	Ukraine	4	3	1	315	287	+28	7	Qualifiers
2	Switzerland	4	2	2	275	282	−7	6	Qualifiers
3	Slovakia	4	1	3	302	323	−21	5	

Source: FIBA
Rules for classification: 1) Points; 2) Head-to-head; 3) Points difference; 4) Points scored.

2 August 2025	Slovakia	73–60	Switzerland	Bratislava
18:00	Scoring by quarter: 13–17, 28–16, 19–7, 13–20
	Pts: Malovec 21; Rebs: Malovec 9 Asts: Krajčovič 5	Report	Pts: T. Ročak 13; Rebs: T. Ročak 7 Asts: Fofana 5	Arena: Gopass Arena; Attendance: 1,826; Referees: Ademir Zurapović (BIH), Martin Vulić (CRO), Geert Jacobs (BEL)

6 August 2025	Switzerland	66–64	Ukraine	Fribourg
19:00	Scoring by quarter: 18–14, 12–13, 15–20, 21–17
	Pts: Fofana 18; Rebs: T. Ročak 7 Asts: Fofana 6	Report	Pts: Tkachenko 13; Rebs: Sanon 7 Asts: Kovliar 10	Arena: Site Sportif Saint-Léonard; Referees: Boris Krejić (SLO), Saverio Lanzarini (ITA), Ivor Matějek (CZE)

9 August 2025	Ukraine	80–71	Slovakia	Riga, Latvia (Note: Due to the Russian invasion of Ukraine, the Ukrainian team plays their home matches at neutral venues.)
17:00	Scoring by quarter: 24–24, 21–14, 17–14, 18–19
	Pts: Sanon 23; Rebs: Bobrov, Lypovyy 8 Asts: Sanon 6	Report	Pts: Malovec 19; Rebs: Pavelka 9 Asts: Krajčovič 4	Arena: Rimi Olympic Centre; Attendance: 500; Referees: Andris Aunkrogers (LAT), Georgios Poursanidis (GRE), Viola Györgyi (ROU)

13 August 2025	Switzerland	85–72	Slovakia	Winterthur
19:00	Scoring by quarter: 17–21, 28–15, 14–17, 26–19
	Pts: Fofana 24; Rebs: three players 6 Asts: Fofana 8	Report	Pts: Malovec 22; Rebs: Pavelka 13; Asts: Kováčik 4	Arena: AXA Arena; Attendance: 1,432; Referees: Ariadna Chueca (ESP), Gatis Saliņš (LAT), Alberto Sánchez (ESP)

16 August 2025	Ukraine	73–64	Switzerland	Riga, Latvia
17:00	Scoring by quarter: 28–12, 13–19, 21–24, 11–9
	Pts: Sanon 15; Rebs: Lypovyy 6 Asts: Sanon 5	Report	Pts: three players 11; Rebs: N. Ročak 10; Asts: five players 2	Arena: Rimi Olympic Centre; Attendance: 600; Referees: Gvidas Gedvilas (LTU), Petar Pešić (SRB), Blaž Zupančič (SLO)

20 August 2025	Slovakia	86–98	Ukraine	Bratislava
18:00	Scoring by quarter: 20–17, 20–32, 27–20, 19–29
	Pts: Malovec 28; Rebs: Pavelka 9 Asts: Krajčovič 9	Report	Pts: Kovliar 33; Rebs: Lypovyy 8 Asts: Kovliar 6	Arena: Gopass Arena; Attendance: 2,376; Referees: Marius Ciulin (ROU), Péter Praksch (HUN), Siniša Prpa (SRB)

===== Group E =====
Pos	Team	Pld	W	L	PF	PA	PD	Pts	Qualification
1	Romania	4	3	1	235	202	+33	7	Qualifiers
2	Hungary	4	2	2	235	216	+19	6	Qualifiers
3	North Macedonia	4	1	3	278	330	−52	5	

Source: FIBA
Rules for classification: 1) Points; 2) Head-to-head; 3) Points difference; 4) Points scored.

2 August 2025	North Macedonia	72–80	Romania	Kumanovo
20:00	Scoring by quarter: 18–17, 14–14, 25–24, 15–25
	Pts: Wiley 28; Rebs: Wiley 12; Asts: Mekić 7	Report	Pts: Tohătan 21; Rebs: Cățe 14; Asts: Diculescu 3	Arena: Sports Hall Kumanovo; Attendance: 5,000; Referees: Georgios Poursanidis (GRE), Yener Yılmaz (TUR), Ventsislav Velikov (BUL)

6 August 2025	Romania	76–64	Hungary	Oradea
19:00	Scoring by quarter: 13–21, 19–11, 22–16, 22–16
	Pts: Măciucă 21; Rebs: Măciucă 7 Asts: Kuti 7	Report	Pts: Perl 15; Rebs: Reuvers 8 Asts: Perl, Pongó 3	Arena: Oradea Arena; Attendance: 3,544; Referees: Ademir Zurapović (BIH), Dariusz Zapolski (POL), Juozas Barkauskas (LTU)

9 August 2025	Hungary	96–58	North Macedonia	Szolnok
18:00	Scoring by quarter: 19–18, 34–19, 17–14, 26–7
	Pts: Pongó 15; Rebs: Golomán 11; Asts: Váradi 5	Report	Pts: Wiley 15; Rebs: Simikj 5 Asts: three players 2	Arena: Tiszaligeti Sportcsarnok; Attendance: 2,000; Referees: Julio Anaya (PAN), Aleksandar Glišić (SRB), Martin Vulić (CRO)

13 August 2025	Romania	79–66	North Macedonia	Oradea
19:00	Scoring by quarter: 26–19, 19–15, 14–15, 20–17
	Pts: Grasu 20; Rebs: Cățe 8 Asts: Tohătan 6	Report	Pts: Wiley 19; Rebs: Wiley 10; Asts: Magdevski, Wiley 5	Arena: Oradea Arena; Attendance: 1,835; Referees: Mārtiņš Kozlovskis (LAT), Nicolás Maestre (FRA), Ivor Matějek (CZE)

16 August 2025	Hungary	86–66	Romania	Szolnok
18:00	Scoring by quarter: 19–18, 21–20, 26–5, 20–23
	Pts: Reuvers 25; Rebs: Meleg, Váradi 6 Asts: Váradi 7	Report	Pts: Cățe 14; Rebs: Cățe 8 Asts: Diculescu, Kuti 5	Arena: Tiszaligeti Sportcsarnok; Attendance: 2,000; Referees: Antonio Conde (ESP), Boris Krejić (SLO), Ofer Manheim (ISR)

20 August 2025	North Macedonia	82–75	Hungary	Kumanovo
19:00	Scoring by quarter: 23–15, 22–17, 19–18, 18–25
	Pts: Wiley 23; Rebs: Hot 5 Asts: Mitrevski 5	Report	Pts: Vojvoda 21; Rebs: Golomán, Meleg 5 Asts: Váradi 3	Arena: Sports Hall Kumanovo; Attendance: 1,000; Referees: Gatis Saliņš (LAT), Michał Proc (POL), Gintaras Mačiulis (LTU)

===== Group F =====
Pos	Team	Pld	W	L	PF	PA	PD	Pts	Qualification
1	Netherlands	4	3	1	313	287	+26	7	Qualifiers
2	Austria	4	2	2	313	298	+15	6	Qualifiers
3	Bulgaria	4	1	3	303	344	−41	5	

Source: FIBA
Rules for classification: 1) Points; 2) Head-to-head; 3) Points difference; 4) Points scored.

2 August 2025	Netherlands	65–64	Austria	The Hague
14:30	Scoring by quarter: 21–12, 13–23, 18–14, 13–15
	Pts: Enaruna 11; Rebs: Enaruna 7 Asts: Van der Vuurst, Ververs 4	Report	Pts: Pöltl 16; Rebs: Pöltl 11; Asts: Güttl 3	Arena: Sportcampus Zuiderpark; Attendance: 2,555; Referees: Mārtiņš Kozlovskis (LAT), Julio Anaya (PAN), Ilias Kounellis (CYP)

6 August 2025	Austria	88–76	Bulgaria	Schwechat
19:20	Scoring by quarter: 24–14, 24–14, 28–25, 12–23
	Pts: Landesberg 26; Rebs: Pöltl 11; Asts: three players 3	Report	Pts: Mladenov 25; Rebs: Mladenov 7 Asts: Young 5	Arena: Multiversum; Attendance: 3,000; Referees: Aleksandar Glišić (SRB), Josip Jurčević (CRO), Zdenko Tomašovič (SVK)

9 August 2025	Bulgaria	70–81	Netherlands	Samokov
18:00	Scoring by quarter: 15–22, 17–22, 21–18, 17–19
	Pts: Stoimenov 18; Rebs: Minchev 6 Asts: Dimitrov 4	Report	Pts: D. N'Guessan 24; Rebs: D. N'Guessan 11; Asts: Van der Vuurst 6	Arena: Arena SamElyon; Attendance: 2,500; Referees: Marius Ciulin (ROU), Yener Yılmaz (TUR), Dariusz Zapolski (POL)

13 August 2025	Austria	83–70	Netherlands	Schwechat
19:20	Scoring by quarter: 19–10, 20–21, 30–17, 14–22
	Pts: Landesberg 14; Rebs: Pöltl 6 Asts: Friedrich 7	Report	Pts: Leons 15; Rebs: Leons 8 Asts: Ververs 6	Arena: Multiversum; Attendance: 3,000; Referees: Ademir Zurapović (BIH), Paulo Marques (POR), Igor Mitrovski (MKD)

16 August 2025	Bulgaria	87–78	Austria	Botevgrad
18:00	Scoring by quarter: 23–17, 15–20, 24–22, 25–19
	Pts: Mladenov 30; Rebs: Mladenov 8 Asts: Alipiev, K. Toshkov 5	Report	Pts: Pöltl 23; Rebs: Pöltl 13; Asts: Friedrich 10	Arena: Arena Botevgrad; Attendance: 2,200; Referees: Georgios Poursanidis (GRE), Kerem Baki (TUR), Marek Kúkelčík (SVK)

20 August 2025	Netherlands	97–70	Bulgaria	Almere
19:30	Scoring by quarter: 25–29, 26–12, 16–14, 30–15
	Pts: Van der Vuurst 22; Rebs: L. N'Guessan 9 Asts: Van der Vuurst 13	Report	Pts: Alipiev 15; Rebs: Stoilov 6 Asts: Alipiev 4	Arena: Topsportcentrum; Attendance: 1,598; Referees: Luis Castillo (ESP), Carsten Straube (GER), Viola Györgyi (ROU)

===== Group G =====
Pos	Team	Pld	W	L	PF	PA	PD	Pts	Qualification
1	Croatia	4	4	0	379	271	+108	8	Qualifiers
2	Denmark	4	2	2	318	317	+1	6	Qualifiers
3	Norway	4	0	4	262	371	−109	4	

Source: FIBA
Rules for classification: 1) Points; 2) Head-to-head; 3) Points difference; 4) Points scored.

2 August 2025	Denmark	89–71	Norway	Farum
18:00	Scoring by quarter: 25–15, 20–21, 20–17, 24–18
	Pts: Jensen 21; Rebs: Erikstrup 8 Asts: Jensen, Pedersen 5	Report	Pts: Frey 23; Rebs: Nordheim 6 Asts: Odfjell, Savić 4	Arena: Farum Arena; Attendance: 1,133; Referees: Gatis Saliņš (LAT), Péter Praksch (HUN), Juozas Barkauskas (LTU)

6 August 2025	Norway	68–101	Croatia	Bergen
18:00	Scoring by quarter: 21–20, 18–31, 12–27, 17–23
	Pts: Savić 13; Rebs: Savić 7 Asts: Espe, Frey 6	Report	Pts: Hezonja 27; Rebs: Hezonja, Šarić 8 Asts: Šarić 5	Arena: Åsane Arena; Attendance: 1,075; Referees: Yener Yılmaz (TUR), Ventsislav Velikov (BUL), Geert Jacobs (BEL)

9 August 2025	Croatia	100–71	Denmark	Opatija
20:30	Scoring by quarter: 24–14, 32–29, 21–16, 23–12
	Pts: Smith 24; Rebs: Drežnjak 5 Asts: Smith 6	Report	Pts: Dibba 17; Rebs: Pedersen 5 Asts: three players 3	Arena: Marino Cvetković Sports Hall; Attendance: 500; Referees: Kerem Baki (TUR), Michał Proc (POL), Zdenko Tomašovič (SVK)

13 August 2025	Norway	70–79	Denmark	Bergen
18:00	Scoring by quarter: 12–15, 15–22, 22–18, 21–24
	Pts: Savić 21; Rebs: Savić 10; Asts: Frey 5	Report	Pts: Erikstrup 32; Rebs: Erikstrup 9 Asts: Heede-Andersen, Jensen 4	Arena: Åsane Arena; Attendance: 1,030; Referees: Saverio Lanzarini (ITA), Fernando Calatrava (ESP), Mihkel Männiste (EST)

16 August 2025	Croatia	102–53	Norway	Opatija
20:30	Scoring by quarter: 28–14, 34–8, 22–13, 18–18
	Pts: Hezonja 21; Rebs: Ružić, Šarić 6 Asts: Šarić 8	Report	Pts: Nordheim, Savić 11; Rebs: Savić 10; Asts: four players 2	Arena: Marino Cvetković Sports Hall; Attendance: 450; Referees: Martin Horozov (BUL), Andris Aunkrogers (LAT), Zafer Yılmaz (TUR)

20 August 2025	Denmark	76–79	Croatia	Farum
19:00	Scoring by quarter: 21–12, 17–24, 19–24, 19–19
	Pts: Dibba 19; Rebs: Ballisager-Webb 11; Asts: Heede-Andersen 8	Report	Pts: Šarić 30; Rebs: Šarić 8 Asts: Badžim 5	Arena: Farum Arena; Attendance: 1,763; Referees: Wojciech Liszka (POL), Lorenzo Baldini (ITA), Mihkel Männiste (EST)

== Qualifiers ==
=== Entrants ===
The 32 teams including 24 teams that qualified for EuroBasket 2025 and the 8 teams from the pre-qualifiers will participate in the first round of the FIBA Basketball World Cup European qualifiers.

Entrance/qualification method	Team(s)
EuroBasket 2025 Hosts (4)	Cyprus; Finland; Latvia; Poland
EuroBasket 2025 Qualifiers (20)	Belgium; Bosnia and Herzegovina; Czech Republic; Estonia; France; Georgia; Germany; Great Britain; Greece; Iceland; Israel; Italy; Lithuania; Montenegro; Portugal; Serbia; Slovenia; Spain; Sweden; Turkey
Advanced from Second round (8)	Austria; Croatia; Denmark; Hungary; Netherlands; Romania; Switzerland; Ukraine

=== Draw ===
The draw was held on 13 May 2025.

=== Seeding ===
The seeding was announced on 9 May 2025.

Pot 1
Team	Pos
Serbia	2
Germany	3
France	4
Spain	5

Pot 5
Team	Pos
Ukraine (Note: Team was not known at the draw.)	37
Israel	39
Belgium	40
Bosnia and Herzegovina	41

Pot 2
Team	Pos
Latvia	9
Lithuania	10
Slovenia	11
Greece	13

Pot 6
Team	Pos
Estonia	43
Romania	63
Netherlands	54
Great Britain	48

Pot 3
Team	Pos
Italy	14
Montenegro	16
Poland	17
Czech Republic	19

Pot 7
Team	Pos
Sweden	49
Iceland	50
Austria	67
Portugal	56

Pot 4
Team	Pos
Finland	20
Georgia	24
Turkey	27
Croatia	32

Pot 8
Team	Pos
Hungary	44
Denmark	59
Switzerland	62
Cyprus	84

=== First round ===
All times are local.

==== Group A ====
Pos	Team	Pld	W	L	PF	PA	PD	Pts	Qualification
1	Spain	6	5	1	526	427	+99	11	Second round
2	Ukraine	6	4	2	504	459	+45	10	Second round
3	Georgia	6	3	3	485	497	−12	9	Second round
4	Denmark	6	0	6	416	548	−132	6	

Source: FIBA
Rules for classification: 1) Points; 2) Head-to-head results; 3) Points difference; 4) Points scored.

27 November 2025	Denmark	64–74	Spain	Farum
18:30	Scoring by quarter: 23–25, 10–20, 14–15, 17–14
	Pts: Jensen 20; Rebs: Larsen 8 Asts: Jensen, Pedersen 3	Report	Pts: Fernández 15; Rebs: Osobor, Paulí 8 Asts: Cárdenas 4	Arena: Farum Arena; Attendance: 2,630; Referees: Mārtiņš Kozlovskis (LAT), Michał Proc (POL), Blaž Zupančič (SLO)

27 November 2025	Georgia	79–92	Ukraine	Tbilisi
21:00	Scoring by quarter: 23–15, 25–28, 13–23, 18–26
	Pts: D. Sanadze 22; Rebs: Shengelia, Shermadini 6 Asts: Andronikashvili 5	Report	Pts: Kovliar 31; Rebs: Bobrov 15; Asts: Kovliar 6	Arena: Tbilisi Arena; Attendance: 9,000; Referees: Mihkel Männiste (EST), Orhan Hekimoğlu (TUR), Çisil Güngör (TUR)

30 November 2025	Ukraine	88–71	Denmark	Riga, Latvia
19:00	Scoring by quarter: 18–20, 28–16, 27–10, 15–25
	Pts: Kovliar 28; Rebs: Bobrov 11; Asts: Kovliar 11	Report	Pts: Erikstrup 21; Rebs: Erikstrup, Larsen 7 Asts: Jensen 10	Arena: Xiaomi Arena; Attendance: 500; Referees: Petar Pešić (SRB), Ilias Kounellis (CYP), Ioannis Tsibouris (GRE)

30 November 2025	Spain	90–61	Georgia	La Laguna
18:45	Scoring by quarter: 19–22, 28–11, 23–13, 20–15
	Pts: Yusta 17; Rebs: Almansa 9 Asts: Yusta 6	Report	Pts: Khatiashvili, Shengelia 10; Rebs: Shengelia 7 Asts: Andronikashvili 4	Arena: Pabellón Insular Santiago Martín; Attendance: 4,603; Referees: Boris Krejić (SLO), Ventsislav Velikov (BUL), Siniša Prpa (SRB)

27 February 2026	Ukraine	66–86	Spain	Riga, Latvia
15:00	Scoring by quarter: 21–17, 12–15, 14–33, 19–21
	Pts: Kovliar 15; Rebs: three players 4 Asts: Zotov 5	Report	Pts: Bassas, Cárdenas 16; Rebs: Almansa 7 Asts: Fernández 5	Arena: Xiaomi Arena; Attendance: 605; Referees: Ademir Zurapović (BIH), Paulo Marques (POR), Edgard Ceccarelli (FRA)

27 February 2026	Denmark	71–89	Georgia	Farum
18:30	Scoring by quarter: 12–12, 20–27, 15–38, 24–12
	Pts: Jensen 15; Rebs: Knudsen, Pedersen 8 Asts: Knudsen 4	Report	Pts: Shengelia 24; Rebs: Shengelia 7 Asts: Reed, Shengelia 5	Arena: Farum Arena; Attendance: 1,908; Referees: Péter Praksch (HUN), Carsten Straube (GER), Valerio Grigioni (ITA)

2 March 2026	Georgia	89–60	Denmark	Tbilisi
21:00	Scoring by quarter: 21–17, 22–14, 30–18, 16–11
	Pts: Reed 29; Rebs: Shengelia 11; Asts: Reed 8	Report	Pts: Klussmann 17; Rebs: Heede-Andersen 9 Asts: Jensen 5	Arena: Tbilisi Arena; Attendance: 7,100; Referees: Georgios Poursanidis (GRE), Çisil Güngör (TUR), Elvis Binders-Čoders (LAT)

2 March 2026	Spain	78–64	Ukraine	Oviedo
20:30	Scoring by quarter: 16–9, 12–12, 24–22, 26–21
	Pts: Alonso 12; Rebs: Oriola 8 Asts: Cárdenas 7	Report	Pts: Voinalovych 12; Rebs: Lypovyy, Shelist 5 Asts: Kovliar 5	Arena: Palacio de los Deportes de Oviedo; Attendance: 5,261; Referees: Martin Vulić (CRO), Dariusz Zapolski (POL), Orhan Hekimoğlu (TUR)

2 July 2026	Ukraine	95–76	Georgia	Riga, Latvia
18:30	Scoring by quarter: 30–27, 19–14, 26–19, 20–16
	Pts: Mykhailiuk 28; Rebs: Skapintsev 14; Asts: Kovliar 6	Report	Pts: Reed 18; Rebs: Bitadze 11; Asts: Ochkhikidze 4	Arena: Xiaomi Arena; Attendance: 600; Referees: Martin Horozov (BUL), Valentin Oliot (FRA), Siniša Prpa (SRB)

2 July 2026	Spain	109–81	Denmark	Madrid
19:00	Scoring by quarter: 24–19, 27–22, 31–14, 27–26
	Pts: Oriola 20; Rebs: Oriola, Pradilla 6 Asts: Cárdenas 8	Report	Pts: Ballisager-Webb 14; Rebs: Ballisager-Webb 7 Asts: Heede-Andersen 6	Arena: Caja Mágica; Attendance: 6,685; Referees: Boris Krejić (SLO), Valerio Grigioni (ITA), Silvia Marziali (ITA)

5 July 2026	Denmark	69–99	Ukraine	Farum
15:00	Scoring by quarter: 25–22, 12–31, 19–24, 13–22
	Pts: Erichsen 14; Rebs: Erichsen 7 Asts: Heede-Andersen 7	Report	Pts: Mykhailiuk 30; Rebs: Kovliar 7 Asts: Kovliar 8	Arena: Farum Arena; Attendance: 1,317; Referees: Zafer Yılmaz (TUR), Orhan Hekimoğlu (TUR), Rainis Värv (EST)

5 July 2026	Georgia	91–89(OT)	Spain	Tbilisi
19:30	Scoring by quarter: 14–32, 24–20, 19–19, 26–12, Overtime: 8–6
	Pts: Shengelia 37; Rebs: Shengelia 10; Asts: Reed 7	Report	Pts: W. Hernangómez 19; Rebs: Hernangómez, Pradilla 8 Asts: Brizuela, Cárdenas 4	Arena: Tbilisi Arena; Attendance: 8,000; Referees: Mārtiņš Kozlovskis (LAT), Josip Jurčević (CRO), Andrea Bongiorni (ITA)

==== Group B ====
Pos	Team	Pld	W	L	PF	PA	PD	Pts	Qualification
1	Montenegro	6	4	2	411	434	−23	10	Second round
2	Portugal	6	3	3	485	449	+36	9 (Note: Portugal 139–132 Greece)	Second round
3	Greece	6	3	3	433	408	+25	9	Second round
4	Romania	6	2	4	459	497	−38	8	

Source: FIBA
Rules for classification: 1) Points; 2) Head-to-head results; 3) Points difference; 4) Points scored.
Notes:

27 November 2025	Greece	91–64	Romania	Thessaloniki
18:30	Scoring by quarter: 26–12, 19–17, 23–15, 23–20
	Pts: Larentzakis 18; Rebs: Samodurov 7 Asts: Larentzakis, Mitrou-Long 6	Report	Pts: Măciucă 13; Rebs: Cățe 8 Asts: Russell 8	Arena: Nick Galis Hall; Attendance: 4,675; Referees: Luis Castillo (ESP), Geert Jacobs (BEL), Siniša Prpa (SRB)

27 November 2025	Montenegro	62–83	Portugal	Podgorica
18:00	Scoring by quarter: 21–14, 11–25, 11–25, 19–19
	Pts: Simonović 13; Rebs: Hadžibegović 9 Asts: Perry 6	Report	Pts: Williams 16; Rebs: C. Sá 10; Asts: Ventura 5	Arena: Morača Sports Center; Attendance: 2,057; Referees: Gvidas Gedvilas (LTU), Fernando Calatrava (ESP), Tolga Edis (TUR)

30 November 2025	Portugal	68–76	Greece	Matosinhos
17:00	Scoring by quarter: 17–24, 19–13, 13–19, 19–20
	Pts: Williams 15; Rebs: C. Sá 8 Asts: Lisboa 4	Report	Pts: Larentzakis 15; Rebs: Karagiannidis 7 Asts: Toliopoulos 5	Arena: Centro de Desportos e Congressos de Matosinhos; Attendance: 1,896; Referees: Wojciech Liszka (POL), Gintaras Mačiulis (LTU), Ritvars Helmšteins (LAT)

30 November 2025	Romania	75–80	Montenegro	Pitești
19:00	Scoring by quarter: 17–26, 17–23, 22–16, 19–15
	Pts: Russell 20; Rebs: Diculescu 9 Asts: Russell 4	Report	Pts: Perry 16; Rebs: Nikolić 6 Asts: Perry 10	Arena: Pitești Arena; Attendance: 3,473; Referees: Mārtiņš Kozlovskis (LAT), Dariusz Zapolski (POL), Çisil Güngör (TUR)

27 February 2026	Greece	65–67	Montenegro	Athens
19:00	Scoring by quarter: 17–19, 21–21, 14–15, 13–12
	Pts: K. Antetokounmpo 13; Rebs: Papanikolaou 6 Asts: Mitrou-Long, Toliopoulos 4	Report	Pts: Nikolić 19; Rebs: Hadžibegović, Simonović 7 Asts: Needham 6	Arena: SUNEL Arena; Attendance: 6,730; Referees: Antonio Conde (ESP), Andris Aunkrogers (LAT), Juozas Barkauskas (LTU)

27 February 2026	Portugal	99–82	Romania	Coimbra
19:00	Scoring by quarter: 25–12, 29–34, 21–15, 24–21
	Pts: Brito 32; Rebs: Williams 8 Asts: Brito 4	Report	Pts: Nicolescu 25; Rebs: Cățe 10; Asts: Russell 4	Arena: Pavilhão Multidesportos Dr. Mário Mexia; Attendance: 1,828; Referees: Michał Proc (POL), Valentin Oliot (FRA), Mehmet Şahin (TUR)

2 March 2026	Romania	101–96	Portugal	Pitești
19:00	Scoring by quarter: 27–22, 23–31, 26–20, 25–23
	Pts: Russell 29; Rebs: Cățe 9 Asts: Russell 6	Report	Pts: Williams 33; Rebs: Monteiro 5 Asts: Da Silva, Ventura 4	Arena: Pitești Arena; Attendance: 2,280; Referees: Mihkel Männiste (EST), Josip Jurčević (CRO), Valerio Grigioni (ITA)

2 March 2026	Montenegro	65–79	Greece	Podgorica
19:00	Scoring by quarter: 18–22, 17–22, 18–13, 12–22
	Pts: Drobnjak 14; Rebs: Drobnjak, Hadžibegović 6 Asts: Ivanović 4	Report	Pts: Toliopoulos 27; Rebs: Mitoglou 8 Asts: Toliopoulos 10	Arena: Morača Sports Center; Attendance: 5,182; Referees: Gatis Saliņš (LAT), Lorenzo Baldini (ITA), Ventsislav Velikov (BUL)

2 July 2026	Romania	73–66	Greece	Oradea
19:00	Scoring by quarter: 16–18, 19–20, 16–20, 22–8
	Pts: Russell 20; Rebs: Uta 9 Asts: Tohătan 6	Report	Pts: Larentzakis 16; Rebs: Papanikolaou 10; Asts: Papanikolaou, Toliopoulos 5	Arena: Oradea Arena; Attendance: 3,001; Referees: Martin Vulić (CRO), Edgard Ceccarelli (FRA), Branimir Galić (CRO)

2 July 2026	Portugal	68–72	Montenegro	Matosinhos
19:00	Scoring by quarter: 13–23, 8–13, 20–13, 27–23
	Pts: Williams 21; Rebs: Queiroz, Relvão 8 Asts: Ventura 4	Report	Pts: Drobnjak 18; Rebs: Hadžibegović 9 Asts: Ferrell 5	Arena: Centro de Desportos e Congressos de Matosinhos; Attendance: 1,612; Referees: Luis Castillo (ESP), Fernando Calatrava (ESP), Polat Parlak (TUR)

5 July 2026	Greece	56–71	Portugal	Athens
19:30	Scoring by quarter: 15–19, 8–9, 19–25, 14–18
	Pts: Mitrou-Long 11; Rebs: Papanikolaou 7 Asts: Mitrou-Long 4	Report	Pts: Brito 17; Rebs: Brito 9 Asts: Lisboa 5	Arena: SUNEL Arena; Attendance: 8,155; Referees: Ademir Zurapović (BIH), Alberto Sánchez (ESP), Valerio Grigioni (ITA)

5 July 2026	Montenegro	65–64	Romania	Bar
20:30	Scoring by quarter: 17–14, 11–15, 27–21, 10–14
	Pts: Drobnjak 13; Rebs: Hadžibegović 12; Asts: Kljajić 5	Report	Pts: Russell 17; Rebs: Cățe 8 Asts: five players 2	Arena: Topolica Sport Hall; Attendance: 2,055; Referees: Michał Proc (POL), Ritvars Helmšteins (LAT), Sergii Zashchuk (UKR)

==== Group C ====
Pos	Team	Pld	W	L	PF	PA	PD	Pts	Qualification
1	Turkey	6	6	0	531	442	+89	12	Second round
2	Serbia	6	4	2	519	488	+31	10	Second round
3	Bosnia and Herzegovina	6	2	4	474	463	+11	8	Second round
4	Switzerland	6	0	6	411	542	−131	6	

Source: FIBA
Rules for classification: 1) Points; 2) Head-to-head results; 3) Points difference; 4) Points scored.

27 November 2025	Serbia	90–86	Switzerland	Belgrade
19:00	Scoring by quarter: 20–30, 14–27, 25–13, 31–16
	Pts: Ristić 24; Rebs: Miljenović 8 Asts: Miljenović 9	Report	Pts: Schumacher 19; Rebs: T. Ročak 5 Asts: Fofana 5	Arena: Aleksandar Nikolić Hall; Attendance: 2,000; Referees: Ariadna Chueca (ESP), Georgios Poursanidis (GRE), Edgard Ceccarelli (FRA)

27 November 2025	Turkey	93–71	Bosnia and Herzegovina	Istanbul
21:00	Scoring by quarter: 29–20, 17–25, 21–13, 26–13
	Pts: Biberović 20; Rebs: Saybir 7 Asts: Sipahi 9	Report	Pts: Alibegović 18; Rebs: Marić, Sulejmanović 4 Asts: Arslanagić 8	Arena: Basketball Development Center; Attendance: 9,876; Referees: Wojciech Liszka (POL), Lorenzo Baldini (ITA), Ritvars Helmšteins (LAT)

30 November 2025	Switzerland	60–85	Turkey	Fribourg
17:00	Scoring by quarter: 17–23, 8–18, 17–24, 18–20
	Pts: Fofana 17; Rebs: Mambo 6 Asts: Fofana 4	Report	Pts: Saybir 19; Rebs: Yurtseven 5 Asts: Sipahi 6	Arena: Site Sportif Saint-Léonard; Attendance: 3,000; Referees: Luis Castillo (ESP), Marius Ciulin (ROU), Blaž Zupančič (SLO)

30 November 2025	Bosnia and Herzegovina	72–74	Serbia	Sarajevo
20:00	Scoring by quarter: 15–13, 24–22, 19–16, 14–23
	Pts: Castañeda 19; Rebs: Alibegović 7 Asts: Atić 5	Report	Pts: Tanasković 24; Rebs: Dobrić, Tanasković 8 Asts: Dobrić 5	Arena: Mirza Delibašić Hall; Attendance: 4,500; Referees: Antonio Conde (ESP), Gatis Saliņš (LAT), Paulo Marques (POR)

27 February 2026	Serbia	78–82	Turkey	Belgrade
19:00	Scoring by quarter: 13–22, 18–24, 23–11, 24–25
	Pts: Marković 19; Rebs: Mitrović 8 Asts: Miljenović, Novak 5	Report	Pts: Biberović 22; Rebs: Osmani, Yurtseven 8 Asts: Osman 6	Arena: Aleksandar Nikolić Hall; Attendance: 7,500; Referees: Yohan Rosso (FRA), Mārtiņš Kozlovskis (LAT), Zdenko Tomašovič (SVK)

27 February 2026	Bosnia and Herzegovina	84–60	Switzerland	Tuzla
20:00	Scoring by quarter: 20–12, 21–15, 23–16, 20–17
	Pts: Vrabac 15; Rebs: Sulejmanović 9 Asts: Atić 9	Report	Pts: Schumacher 19; Rebs: Mambo 10; Asts: Schumacher 3	Arena: Mejdan Hall; Attendance: 5,000; Referees: Georgios Poursanidis (GRE), Martin Horozov (BUL), Ioannis Tsibouris (GRE)

2 March 2026	Turkey	94–86	Serbia	Istanbul
21:00	Scoring by quarter: 28–21, 20–23, 28–19, 18–23
	Pts: Biberović 21; Rebs: Biberović 5 Asts: Biberović 5	Report	Pts: Avramović 16; Rebs: Tanasković 6 Asts: Avramović 9	Arena: Basketball Development Center; Attendance: 9,422; Referees: Luis Castillo (ESP), Paulo Marques (POR), Martin Horozov (BUL)

2 March 2026	Switzerland	60–91	Bosnia and Herzegovina	Kriens
19:00	Scoring by quarter: 14–21, 20–29, 18–24, 8–17
	Pts: Mbala 9 Rebs: Granvorka 10; Asts: Schumacher 9	Report	Pts: Musa 25; Rebs: Kamenjaš 8 Asts: Talić 6	Arena: Pilatus Arena; Attendance: 3,820; Referees: Ariadna Chueca (ESP), Gintaras Mačiulis (LTU), Ilias Kounellis (CYP)

2 July 2026	Switzerland	73–97	Serbia	Fribourg
20:00	Scoring by quarter: 27–30, 17–19, 13–17, 16–31
	Pts: Schumacher 19; Rebs: Soroa 5 Asts: three players 2	Report	Pts: Jokić, Jović 22; Rebs: Jokić 14; Asts: Jokić 7	Arena: BCF Arena; Attendance: 8,113; Referees: Mārtiņš Kozlovskis (LAT), Juozas Barkauskas (LTU), Sergii Zashchuk (UKR)

2 July 2026	Bosnia and Herzegovina	75–82	Turkey	Zenica
20:00	Scoring by quarter: 18–17, 21–17, 18–25, 18–23
	Pts: Garza 27; Rebs: Garza 8 Asts: Atić 6	Report	Pts: Hazer 16; Rebs: Osman 11; Asts: Sipahi 7	Arena: Arena Zenica; Attendance: 3,500; Referees: Antonio Conde (ESP), Dariusz Zapolski (POL), Ritvars Helmšteins (LAT)

6 July 2026	Turkey	95–72	Switzerland	Istanbul
19:00	Scoring by quarter: 22–19, 25–22, 29–11, 19–20
	Pts: Yurtseven 18; Rebs: Bona 8 Asts: Şengün, Sipahi 5	Report	Pts: Schumacher 23; Rebs: Schumacher, Soroa 4 Asts: Schumacher 5	Arena: Sinan Erdem Dome; Attendance: 14,508; Referees: Andris Aunkrogers (LAT), Edgard Ceccarelli (FRA), Silvia Marziali (ITA)

6 July 2026	Serbia	94–81	Bosnia and Herzegovina	Belgrade
20:00	Scoring by quarter: 27–15, 27–20, 21–24, 19–22
	Pts: Jović 32; Rebs: Jokić 10; Asts: Jokić 11	Report	Pts: Garza 16; Rebs: Alibegović, Garza 7 Asts: Talić 8	Arena: Aleksandar Nikolić Hall; Attendance: 7,249; Referees: Wojciech Liszka (POL), Gatis Saliņš (LAT), Lorenzo Baldini (ITA)

==== Group D ====
Pos	Team	Pld	W	L	PF	PA	PD	Pts	Qualification
1	Italy	6	5	1	524	461	+63	11	Second round
2	Lithuania	6	3	3	543	510	+33	9 (Note: Lithuania 184–168 Iceland)	Second round
3	Iceland	6	3	3	504	538	−34	9	Second round
4	Great Britain	6	1	5	481	543	−62	7	

Source: FIBA
Rules for classification: 1) Points; 2) Head-to-head results; 3) Points difference; 4) Points scored.
Notes:

27 November 2025	Italy	76–81	Iceland	Tortona
20:00	Scoring by quarter: 21–21, 13–17, 20–23, 22–20
	Pts: Casarin 19; Rebs: Tessitori 10; Asts: Tessitori 5	Report	Pts: Friðriksson 29; Rebs: Hlinason 7 Asts: Friðriksson 5	Arena: PalaFerraris; Attendance: 4,711; Referees: Andris Aunkrogers (LAT), Dariusz Zapolski (POL), Ofer Manheim (ISR)

27 November 2025	Great Britain	88–89	Lithuania	London
19:30	Scoring by quarter: 21–16, 30–22, 16–30, 21–21
	Pts: Hesson, Wheatle 18; Rebs: Hesson 8 Asts: Hesson 5	Report	Pts: Sargiūnas 27; Rebs: Velička 10; Asts: three players 4	Arena: Copper Box Arena; Attendance: 2,809; Referees: Gatis Saliņš (LAT), Marius Ciulin (ROU), Elvis Binders-Čoders (LAT)

30 November 2025	Lithuania	81–82	Italy	Klaipėda
18:30	Scoring by quarter: 19–16, 20–18, 15–20, 27–28
	Pts: Sargiūnas 18; Rebs: Blaževič 13; Asts: Velička 7	Report	Pts: Procida 24; Rebs: Tessitori 5 Asts: Casarin 5	Arena: Švyturio Arena; Attendance: 5,011; Referees: Yohan Rosso (FRA), Josip Jurčević (CRO), Valentin Oliot (FRA)

30 November 2025	Iceland	84–90	Great Britain	Reykjavík
16:45	Scoring by quarter: 17–17, 18–26, 16–26, 33–21
	Pts: Hermannsson 18; Rebs: Pálsson 10; Asts: Friðriksson 8	Report	Pts: Wheatle 22; Rebs: Yeboah 7 Asts: Ellis 8	Arena: Laugardalshöll; Attendance: 1,800; Referees: Mihkel Männiste (EST), Edgard Ceccarelli (FRA), Ioannis Agrafiotis (GRE)

27 February 2026	Great Britain	57–93	Italy	Newcastle upon Tyne
19:30	Scoring by quarter: 14–32, 13–19, 19–14, 11–28
	Pts: Wheatle 10; Rebs: Hesson 6 Asts: Wheatle 8	Report	Pts: Mannion 19; Rebs: Akele 9 Asts: Spissu 6	Arena: Vertu Motors Arena; Attendance: 2,407; Referees: Martin Vulić (CRO), Fernando Calatrava (ESP), Ivor Matějek (CZE)

27 February 2026	Iceland	86–85	Lithuania	Reykjavík
19:30	Scoring by quarter: 24–21, 19–23, 11–24, 32–17
	Pts: Friðriksson 34; Rebs: Hlinason 5 Asts: Friðriksson 6	Report	Pts: Blaževič 19; Rebs: Blaževič 11; Asts: Žemaitis 6	Arena: Laugardalshöll; Attendance: 1,886; Referees: Boris Krejić (SLO), Yener Yılmaz (TUR), Alberto Sánchez (ESP)

2 March 2026	Lithuania	99–82	Iceland	Klaipėda
18:30	Scoring by quarter: 26–14, 26–19, 27–23, 20–26
	Pts: Brazdeikis 27; Rebs: Kačinas 7 Asts: Žemaitis 5	Report	Pts: Pálsson 23; Rebs: Guðmundsson 8 Asts: Friðriksson 8	Arena: Švyturio Arena; Attendance: 5,079; Referees: Ademir Zurapović (BIH), Fernando Calatrava (ESP), Mehmet Şahin (TUR)

2 March 2026	Italy	84–75	Great Britain	Livorno
19:30	Scoring by quarter: 21–21, 22–17, 21–21, 20–16
	Pts: Niang 23; Rebs: Niang 7 Asts: Spissu 7	Report	Pts: Ellis 19; Rebs: Hesson 10; Asts: Ellis 6	Arena: PalaLivorno; Attendance: 7,900; Referees: Boris Krejić (SLO), Yener Yılmaz (TUR), Siniša Prpa (SRB)

2 July 2026	Lithuania	105–85	Great Britain	Klaipėda
18:30	Scoring by quarter: 36–28, 23–13, 21–24, 25–20
	Pts: Tubelis 21; Rebs: Valančiūnas 11; Asts: Jakučionis 8	Report	Pts: Hesson 22; Rebs: Olaseni 6 Asts: Nelson, Wheatle 6	Arena: Švyturio Arena; Attendance: 5,288; Referees: Georgios Poursanidis (GRE), Zdenko Tomašovič (SVK), Blaž Zupančič (SLO)

2 July 2026	Iceland	83–102	Italy	Reykjavík
19:45	Scoring by quarter: 25–27, 21–31, 16–26, 21–18
	Pts: Hermannsson 22; Rebs: Guðmundsson, Hlinason 6 Asts: Friðriksson 6	Report	Pts: Baldasso 16; Rebs: Emejuru 5 Asts: Spagnolo 7	Arena: Laugardalshöll; Attendance: 1,950; Referees: Yohan Rosso (FRA), Josip Jurčević (CRO), Zafer Yılmaz (TUR)

5 July 2026	Great Britain	86–88	Iceland	Manchester
15:00	Scoring by quarter: 24–19, 25–22, 20–21, 17–26
	Pts: Uduje 23; Rebs: Wheatle 11; Asts: Uduje 6	Report	Pts: Guðmundsson 25; Rebs: Guðmundsson, Hlinason 8 Asts: Friðriksson 10	Arena: National Basketball Performance Centre; Attendance: 2,045; Referees: Marius Ciulin (ROU), Siniša Prpa (SRB), Ariadna Chueca (ESP)

5 July 2026	Italy	87–84	Lithuania	Bologna
20:00	Scoring by quarter: 22–25, 18–12, 19–24, 28–23
	Pts: Mannion 27; Rebs: Akele 7 Asts: Mannion 5	Report	Pts: Tubelis 25; Rebs: Tubelis 12; Asts: Brazdeikis 5	Arena: Virtus Arena; Attendance: 4,500; Referees: Antonio Conde (ESP), Valentin Oliot (FRA), Elvis Binders-Čoders (LAT)

==== Group E ====
Pos	Team	Pld	W	L	PF	PA	PD	Pts	Qualification
1	Croatia	6	5	1	593	435	+158	11 (Note: Croatia 182–179 Germany)	Second round
2	Germany	6	5	1	554	480	+74	11	Second round
3	Israel	6	2	4	478	477	+1	8	Second round
4	Cyprus	6	0	6	361	594	−233	6	

Source: FIBA
Rules for classification: 1) Points; 2) Head-to-head results; 3) Points difference; 4) Points scored.
Notes:

28 November 2025	Croatia	100–60	Cyprus	Osijek
19:00	Scoring by quarter: 28–8, 19–19, 28–23, 25–10
	Pts: Hezonja 25; Rebs: Prkačin 8 Asts: Mavra 7	Report	Pts: F. Tigkas 14; Rebs: Jung 9 Asts: Michail 6	Arena: Gradski vrt Hall; Attendance: 2,000; Referees: Péter Praksch (HUN), Alberto Sánchez (ESP), Ivor Matějek (CZE)

28 November 2025	Germany	89–69	Israel	Neu-Ulm
19:30	Scoring by quarter: 26–22, 24–9, 19–22, 20–16
	Pts: O. Da Silva 19; Rebs: Bonga 10; Asts: Hollatz 6	Report	Pts: Sorkin 18; Rebs: Sorkin, Zoosman 7 Asts: Timor 4	Arena: Ratiopharm Arena; Attendance: 6,049; Referees: Boris Krejić (SLO), Valentin Oliot (FRA), Zafer Yılmaz (TUR)

1 December 2025	Cyprus	64–83	Germany	Limassol
19:00	Scoring by quarter: 17–20, 22–22, 9–27, 16–14
	Pts: Stylianou 16; Rebs: Michail 6 Asts: Michail 4	Report	Pts: Krämer, Pape 14; Rebs: Krämer 10; Asts: Kayil 5	Arena: Spyros Kyprianou Athletic Center; Attendance: 950; Referees: Lorenzo Baldini (ITA), Zdenko Tomašovič (SVK), Elvis Binders-Čoders (LAT)

1 December 2025	Israel	71–85	Croatia	Riga, Latvia (Note: Due to the Gaza war, the Israelian team plays their home matches at neutral venues.)
21:00	Scoring by quarter: 25–25, 17–22, 14–24, 15–14
	Pts: Sorkin 20; Rebs: Zoosman 6 Asts: Huber 6	Report	Pts: Ružić 23; Rebs: Hezonja 13; Asts: Smith 6	Arena: Xiaomi Arena; Attendance: 45; Referees: Gvidas Gedvilas (LTU), Michał Proć (POL), Tolga Edis (TUR)

27 February 2026	Croatia	93–88	Germany	Zagreb
20:00	Scoring by quarter: 20–26, 26–24, 29–22, 18–16
	Pts: Šarić 23; Rebs: Šarić 7 Asts: Mavra, Smith 6	Report	Pts: Krämer 22; Rebs: Schneider 9 Asts: Kayil 5	Arena: Dražen Petrović Basketball Hall; Attendance: 4,700; Referees: Wojciech Liszka (POL), Gatis Saliņš (LAT), Ritvars Helmšteins (LAT)

27 February 2026	Israel	94–54	Cyprus	Limassol, Cyprus
21:00	Scoring by quarter: 32–15, 26–8, 13–16, 23–15
	Pts: Madar 22; Rebs: Zalmanson 8 Asts: Zalmanson 6	Report	Pts: F. Tigkas 12; Rebs: Koumis 7 Asts: Michail 4	Arena: Spyros Kyprianou Athletic Center; Referees: Mihkel Männiste (EST), Gintaras Mačiulis (LTU), Viola Györgyi (NOR)

1 March 2026	Germany	91–89(OT)	Croatia	Bonn
18:00	Scoring by quarter: 22–24, 19–26, 21–17, 15–10, Overtime: 14–12
	Pts: Thiemann 24; Rebs: Thiemann 12; Asts: Kayil 6	Report	Pts: Hezonja 20; Rebs: Smith 9 Asts: Smith 9	Arena: Telekom Dome; Attendance: 6,032; Referees: Yohan Rosso (FRA), Andris Aunkrogers (LAT), Zdenko Tomašovič (SVK)

1 March 2026	Cyprus	54–83	Israel	Limassol
19:00	Scoring by quarter: 12–24, 17–21, 13–23, 12–15
	Pts: F. Tigkas 15; Rebs: Koumis 8 Asts: Varsos 4	Report	Pts: three players 13; Rebs: Sorkin 11; Asts: Carrington 6	Arena: Spyros Kyprianou Athletic Center; Attendance: 800; Referees: Marius Ciulin (ROU), Valentin Oliot (FRA), Silvia Marziali (ITA)

3 July 2026	Cyprus	50–123	Croatia	Limassol
20:00	Scoring by quarter: 12–35, 14–24, 10–33, 14–31
	Pts: S. Tigkas 10; Rebs: Mantovani, Pashialis 4 Asts: five players 2	Report	Pts: Zubac 24; Rebs: Zubac 11; Asts: Hezonja 12	Arena: Spyros Kyprianou Athletic Center; Attendance: 1,000; Referees: Lorenzo Baldini (ITA), Ivor Matějek (CZE), Rainis Värv (EST)

3 July 2026	Israel	86–92	Germany	Riga, Latvia
20:00	Scoring by quarter: 15–23, 22–22, 18–31, 31–16
	Pts: Madar 31; Rebs: Ginat 8 Asts: Ginat 7	Report	Pts: Schröder 20; Rebs: Sengfelder 6 Asts: Schröder 9	Arena: Xiaomi Arena; Attendance: 100; Referees: Alberto Sánchez (ESP), Elvis Binders-Čoders (LAT), Ariadna Chueca (ESP)

6 July 2026	Germany	111–79	Cyprus	Bamberg
19:00	Scoring by quarter: 22–21, 34–10, 30–25, 25–23
	Pts: Schröder 20; Rebs: Sengfelder 10; Asts: Schröder 9	Report	Pts: Giannaras, F. Tigkas 14; Rebs: Mantovani 5 Asts: Giannaras, Iliadis 4	Arena: Brose Arena; Attendance: 5,713; Referees: Dariusz Zapolski (POL), Blaž Zupančič (SLO), Tomasz Łangowski (POL)

6 July 2026	Croatia	103–75	Israel	Osijek
20:00	Scoring by quarter: 25–12, 22–19, 27–20, 29–24
	Pts: Zubac 18; Rebs: Šarić 13; Asts: Šarić 7	Report	Pts: Madar 21; Rebs: Palatin 6 Asts: Madar, Palatin 5	Arena: Gradski vrt Hall; Attendance: 2,788; Referees: Martin Horozov (BUL), Geert Jacobs (BEL), Juozas Barkauskas (LTU)

==== Group F ====
Pos	Team	Pld	W	L	PF	PA	PD	Pts	Qualification
1	Poland	6	6	0	566	476	+90	12	Second round
2	Latvia	6	3	3	502	465	+37	9	Second round
3	Netherlands	6	2	4	490	486	+4	8	Second round
4	Austria	6	1	5	448	579	−131	7	

Source: FIBA
Rules for classification: 1) Points; 2) Head-to-head results; 3) Points difference; 4) Points scored.

28 November 2025	Latvia	78–86	Netherlands	Riga
19:30	Scoring by quarter: 12–26, 17–22, 21–17, 28–21
	Pts: Lomažs 17; Rebs: Mejeris 6 Asts: Lomažs, Mejeris 5	Report	Pts: Kuta 17; Rebs: Kruithof 6 Asts: Van der Vuurst 8	Arena: Xiaomi Arena; Attendance: 9,068; Referees: Petar Pešić (SRB), Ilias Kounellis (CYP), Ioannis Tsibouris (GRE)

28 November 2025	Poland	90–78	Austria	Gdynia
20:45	Scoring by quarter: 22–18, 21–21, 26–21, 21–18
	Pts: Harding 32; Rebs: Ponitka 9 Asts: Harding 5	Report	Pts: Landesberg 20; Rebs: Ogunsipe 8 Asts: Vujošević 6	Arena: Polsat Plus Arena; Attendance: 3,828; Referees: Martin Horozov (BUL), Carsten Straube (GER), Mehmet Şahin (TUR)

1 December 2025	Netherlands	83–85	Poland	The Hague
19:30	Scoring by quarter: 28–22, 25–15, 17–21, 13–27
	Pts: Franke 26; Rebs: Franke 6 Asts: Van der Vuurst 6	Report	Pts: Ponitka 22; Rebs: Ponitka 9 Asts: Łączyński, Ponitka 4	Arena: Sportcampus Zuiderpark; Attendance: 3,370; Referees: Martin Vulić (CRO), Alberto Sánchez (ESP), Orhan Hekimoğlu (TUR)

1 December 2025	Austria	68–86	Latvia	Vienna
20:20	Scoring by quarter: 24–20, 13–20, 17–29, 14–17
	Pts: Vujošević 27; Rebs: Vujošević 8 Asts: three players 3	Report	Pts: Lomažs 24; Rebs: Šiliņš 5 Asts: Leimanis 6	Arena: Sport Arena Wien; Attendance: 1,000; Referees: Yener Yılmaz (TUR), Ivor Matějek (CZE), Viola Györgyi (NOR)

27 February 2026	Austria	71–81	Netherlands	Vienna
18:00	Scoring by quarter: 13–17, 21–23, 19–15, 18–26
	Pts: Vujošević 23; Rebs: Schott 15; Asts: Vujošević 6	Report	Pts: Van der Vuurst 25; Rebs: D. N'Guessan 13; Asts: Van der Vuurst 6	Arena: Sport Arena Wien; Attendance: 1,000; Referees: Geert Jacobs (BEL), Çisil Güngör (TUR), Andrea Bongiorni (ITA)

27 February 2026	Latvia	82–84	Poland	Riga
19:30	Scoring by quarter: 23–21, 25–21, 14–24, 20–18
	Pts: Strautiņš 27; Rebs: Strautiņš 6 Asts: A. Kurucs, Lomažs 3	Report	Pts: Loyd 37; Rebs: Olejniczak 12; Asts: Sokołowski 5	Arena: Xiaomi Arena; Attendance: 10,829; Referees: Ariadna Chueca (ESP), Josip Jurčević (CRO), Tolga Edis (TUR)

1 March 2026	Netherlands	87–88	Austria	The Hague
14:30	Scoring by quarter: 23–18, 27–25, 17–18, 20–27
	Pts: Franke, Van der Vuurst 17; Rebs: Kruithof 10; Asts: Van der Vuurst, Ververs 5	Report	Pts: Schott 19; Rebs: Schott 11; Asts: Vujošević 13	Arena: Sportcampus Zuiderpark; Attendance: 3,455; Referees: Zafer Yılmaz (TUR), Alberto Sánchez (ESP), Blaž Zupančič (SLO)

1 March 2026	Poland	92–72	Latvia	Gdynia
20:30	Scoring by quarter: 23–16, 31–20, 16–18, 22–18
	Pts: Loyd 21; Rebs: Sokołowski 8 Asts: Ponitka 8	Report	Pts: Strautiņš 20; Rebs: Blumbergs 6 Asts: three players 4	Arena: Polsat Plus Arena; Attendance: 4,105; Referees: Antonio Conde (ESP), Péter Praksch (HUN), Geert Jacobs (BEL)

3 July 2026	Austria	77–123	Poland	Vienna
18:00	Scoring by quarter: 16–24, 12–29, 29–28, 20–42
	Pts: Zeleznik 14; Rebs: Kapic 5 Asts: Jakupović 5	Report	Pts: Kolenda 23; Rebs: Olejniczak 8 Asts: Łączyński 7	Arena: Sport Arena Wien; Attendance: 1,600; Referees: Yener Yılmaz (TUR), Ilias Kounellis (CYP), Nemanja Ninković (SRB)

3 July 2026	Netherlands	69–72	Latvia	Almere
19:30	Scoring by quarter: 26–18, 7–23, 21–11, 15–20
	Pts: Van der Vuurst 23; Rebs: Van der Vuurst 8 Asts: Van der Vuurst 5	Report	Pts: Lomažs, Žagars 21; Rebs: Čavars, Strautiņš 7 Asts: Lomažs 4	Arena: Topsportcentrum; Attendance: 3,118; Referees: Ademir Zurapović (BIH), Marius Ciulin (ROU), Roko Hordov (CRO)

6 July 2026	Poland	92–84	Netherlands	Kraków
18:00	Scoring by quarter: 18–16, 28–28, 27–21, 19–19
	Pts: Łączyński 18; Rebs: Olejniczak 9 Asts: Łączyński 5	Report	Pts: Van der Vuurst 26; Rebs: Kuta 7 Asts: Van der Vuurst 9	Arena: Tauron Arena; Attendance: 8,110; Referees: Gintaras Mačiulis (LTU), Zdenko Tomašovič (SVK), Ilias Karpanos (GRE)

6 July 2026	Latvia	112–66	Austria	Riga
19:30	Scoring by quarter: 22–22, 32–20, 30–9, 28–15
	Pts: Laksa 20; Rebs: Ķilps 6 Asts: Skuja 10	Report	Pts: Kapic 19; Rebs: Kapic 6 Asts: Friedrich 5	Arena: Xiaomi Arena; Attendance: 9,219; Referees: Boris Krejić (SLO), Ivor Matějek (CZE), Mehmet Şahin (TUR)

==== Group G ====
Pos	Team	Pld	W	L	PF	PA	PD	Pts	Qualification
1	France	6	5	1	505	437	+68	11	Second round
2	Finland	6	4	2	468	481	−13	10	Second round
3	Hungary	6	3	3	488	494	−6	9	Second round
4	Belgium	6	0	6	431	480	−49	6	

Source: FIBA
Rules for classification: 1) Points; 2) Head-to-head results; 3) Points difference; 4) Points scored.

28 November 2025	Hungary	89–82	Finland	Szombathely
18:00	Scoring by quarter: 31–17, 29–22, 15–22, 14–21
	Pts: Perl 25; Rebs: Reuvers 6 Asts: Somogyi 6	Report	Pts: Salin 16; Rebs: Muurinen 8 Asts: Jantunen, Salin 4	Arena: Arena Savaria; Attendance: 2,700; Referees: Martin Vulić (CRO), Yener Yılmaz (TUR), Ioannis Agrafiotis (GRE)

28 November 2025	France	79–63	Belgium	Rouen
20:30	Scoring by quarter: 16–17, 13–14, 20–14, 30–18
	Pts: Sene 15; Rebs: Gaudoux 8 Asts: Albicy 6	Report	Pts: Obasohan 14; Rebs: Bolavie, Van Vliet 5 Asts: four players 2	Arena: Kindarena; Attendance: 4,206; Referees: Antonio Conde (ESP), Paulo Marques (POR), Valerio Grigioni (ITA)

1 December 2025	Finland	83–76	France	Espoo
18:30	Scoring by quarter: 20–19, 17–26, 19–16, 27–15
	Pts: Maxhuni 20; Rebs: Jantunen 9 Asts: Jantunen 6	Report	Pts: Strazel 11; Rebs: Gaudoux 7 Asts: Sene, Strazel 3	Arena: Espoo Metro Areena; Attendance: 6,683; Referees: Ademir Zurapović (BIH), Fernando Calatrava (ESP), Juozas Barkauskas (LTU)

1 December 2025	Belgium	85–87	Hungary	Mons
20:30	Scoring by quarter: 15–18, 21–27, 19–21, 30–21
	Pts: Obasohan 31; Rebs: Tumba 12; Asts: Mennes, Obasohan 5	Report	Pts: Reuvers 26; Rebs: Reuvers 10; Asts: Somogyi 13	Arena: Mons Arena; Attendance: 1,526; Referees: Ariadna Chueca (ESP), Andris Aunkrogers (LAT), Mehmet Şahin (TUR)

27 February 2026	Hungary	71–74	France	Szombathely
18:00	Scoring by quarter: 15–16, 16–22, 16–17, 24–19
	Pts: Perl 21; Rebs: Golomán 6 Asts: Somogyi 7	Report	Pts: Noua 15; Rebs: Cornelie, Noua 6 Asts: Francisco 5	Arena: Arena Savaria; Attendance: 2,900; Referees: Gvidas Gedvilas (LTU), Zafer Yılmaz (TUR), Ofer Manheim (ISR)

27 February 2026	Belgium	66–71	Finland	Charleroi
20:30	Scoring by quarter: 24–12, 13–20, 19–16, 10–23
	Pts: Lecomte 20; Rebs: Bolavie 6 Asts: Lecomte 6	Report	Pts: Nkamhoua 23; Rebs: Nkamhoua 12; Asts: Maxhuni 6	Arena: DÔME; Attendance: 3,000; Referees: Petar Pešić (SRB), Blaž Zupančič (SLO), Elvis Binders-Čoders (LAT)

1 March 2026	Finland	78–75	Belgium	Espoo
18:30	Scoring by quarter: 17–22, 17–15, 22–15, 22–23
	Pts: Nkamhoua 23; Rebs: Madsen 11; Asts: four players 2	Report	Pts: Schwartz 19; Rebs: Bratanovic, N. De Ridder 6 Asts: Lecomte 7	Arena: Espoo Metro Areena; Attendance: 6,822; Referees: Wojciech Liszka (POL), Carsten Straube (GER), Ritvars Helmšteins (LAT)

1 March 2026	France	98–79	Hungary	Le Mans
18:00	Scoring by quarter: 25–16, 30–19, 19–24, 24–20
	Pts: Noua 21; Rebs: Hoard 6 Asts: Okobo 5	Report	Pts: Perl 18; Rebs: four players 4 Asts: Perl 5	Arena: Antarès; Attendance: 5,812; Referees: Petar Pešić (SRB), Ivor Matějek (CZE), Ioannis Agrafiotis (GRE)

3 July 2026	Finland	85–77	Hungary	Helsinki
18:30	Scoring by quarter: 13–18, 35–25, 26–15, 11–19
	Pts: Markkanen 23; Rebs: Gustavson 6 Asts: Little, Salin 3	Report	Pts: Golomán, Perl 18; Rebs: Valerio-Bodon 6 Asts: Somogyi 5	Arena: Veikkaus Arena; Attendance: 12,489; Referees: Andris Aunkrogers (LAT), Gintaras Mačiulis (LTU), Mehmet Şahin (TUR)

3 July 2026	Belgium	72–80	France	Antwerp
20:30	Scoring by quarter: 13–22, 17–21, 25–16, 17–21
	Pts: Lecomte 17; Rebs: Van Vliet 6 Asts: Van Den Eynde 7	Report	Pts: Coulibaly 13; Rebs: Gobert 11; Asts: Hifi 6	Arena: Lotto Arena; Attendance: 4,436; Referees: Michał Proć (POL), Andrea Bongiorni (ITA), Łukasz Jankowski (POL)

6 July 2026	Hungary	85–70	Belgium	Székesfehérvár
18:00	Scoring by quarter: 23–19, 23–17, 16–21, 23–13
	Pts: Perl 19; Rebs: Maronka 5 Asts: Somogyi 11	Report	Pts: three players 10; Rebs: Guisse 12; Asts: Lecomte 4	Arena: MET Aréna; Attendance: 4,752; Referees: Paulo Marques (POR), Branimir Galić (CRO), Nermin Hodzic (GER)

6 July 2026	France	98–69	Finland	Pau
20:30	Scoring by quarter: 31–16, 18–14, 28–17, 21–22
	Pts: Okobo, Raynaud 16; Rebs: Hoard 8 Asts: Strazel 7	Report	Pts: Jantunen, Markkanen 14; Rebs: Jantunen 5 Asts: Maxhuni 5	Arena: Palais des Sports de Pau; Attendance: 7,131; Referees: Luis Castillo (ESP), Mārtiņš Kozlovskis (LAT), Ilias Kounellis (CYP)

==== Group H ====
Pos	Team	Pld	W	L	PF	PA	PD	Pts	Qualification
1	Estonia	6	3	3	509	483	+26	9	Second round
2	Slovenia	6	3	3	513	501	+12	9	Second round
3	Sweden	6	3	3	494	503	−9	9	Second round
4	Czechia	6	3	3	488	517	−29	9	

Source: FIBA
Rules for classification: 1) Points; 2) Head-to-head results; 3) Points difference; 4) Points scored.

28 November 2025	Slovenia	93–94(OT)	Estonia	Koper
18:00	Scoring by quarter: 20–19, 18–20, 20–26, 21–14, Overtime: 14–15
	Pts: Hrovat 23; Rebs: Cerkvenik, Omić 6 Asts: Samar 8	Report	Pts: Drell 29; Rebs: Riismaa 8 Asts: Drell 6	Arena: Arena Bonifika; Attendance: 1,570; Referees: Yohan Rosso (FRA), Ventsislav Velikov (BUL), Zdenko Tomašovič (SVK)

28 November 2025	Czechia	97–80	Sweden	Prague
19:30	Scoring by quarter: 27–22, 20–24, 27–17, 23–17
	Pts: Satoranský 16; Rebs: Sehnal 6 Asts: Satoransky, Sehnal 6	Report	Pts: Borg 18; Rebs: Falk, Håkanson 6 Asts: Håkanson 15	Arena: Královka Arena; Attendance: 1,961; Referees: Ademir Zurapović (BIH), Josip Jurčević (CRO), Juozas Barkauskas (LTU)

1 December 2025	Sweden	83–94	Slovenia	Gothenburg
19:00	Scoring by quarter: 16–31, 26–18, 22–24, 19–21
	Pts: Håkanson 34; Rebs: Falk 6 Asts: Håkanson 6	Report	Pts: Samar 16; Rebs: Omić 7 Asts: Samar 5	Arena: Scandinavium; Attendance: 9,128; Referees: Georgios Poursanidis (GRE), Péter Praksch (HUN), Geert Jacobs (BEL)

1 December 2025	Estonia	92–97	Czechia	Tallinn
20:00	Scoring by quarter: 29–27, 24–31, 21–22, 18–17
	Pts: Treier 26; Rebs: Konontšuk 5 Asts: Jõesaar 8	Report	Pts: Satoranský 18; Rebs: Peterka, Sehnal 5 Asts: Satoranský 16	Arena: Unibet Arena; Attendance: 6,594; Referees: Martin Horozov (BUL), Zafer Yılmaz (TUR), Silvia Marziali (ITA)

27 February 2026	Slovenia	99–59	Czechia	Koper
18:30	Scoring by quarter: 20–16, 24–20, 31–14, 24–9
	Pts: Samar 19; Rebs: Joksimović, Omić 6 Asts: Samar 7	Report	Pts: Kyzlink 18; Rebs: Peterka 10; Asts: Sýkora 3	Arena: Arena Bonifika; Attendance: 2,200; Referees: Luis Castillo (ESP), Marius Ciulin (ROU), Dariusz Zapolski (POL)

27 February 2026	Sweden	77–88	Estonia	Stockholm
19:00	Scoring by quarter: 22–22, 14–24, 22–11, 19–31
	Pts: Håkanson 21; Rebs: Hampton 7 Asts: Håkanson 6	Report	Pts: Drell 23; Rebs: Konontšuk 6 Asts: Suurorg 5	Arena: Avicii Arena; Attendance: 9,364; Referees: Ventsislav Velikov (BUL), Lorenzo Baldini (ITA), Siniša Prpa (SRB)

1 March 2026	Czechia	84–86	Slovenia	Jihlava
18:00	Scoring by quarter: 27–21, 27–15, 9–27, 21–23
	Pts: Kyzlink 22; Rebs: Satoranský 7 Asts: Satoranský 9	Report	Pts: Prepelič 20; Rebs: Omić 11; Asts: Samar 6	Arena: Horácká aréna Attendance: 5,321; Referees: Gvidas Gedvilas (LTU), Michał Proc (POL), Edgard Ceccarelli (FRA)

1 March 2026	Estonia	69–79	Sweden	Tallinn
19:00	Scoring by quarter: 22–23, 16–15, 17–13, 14–28
	Pts: Drell 16; Rebs: Jõesaar 6 Asts: Suurorg, Treier 4	Report	Pts: Håkanson 18; Rebs: Bangala 10; Asts: Pantzar 7	Arena: Unibet Arena; Attendance: 6,637; Referees: Mārtiņš Kozlovskis (LAT), Juozas Barkauskas (LTU), Ioannis Tsibouris (GRE)

3 July 2026	Estonia	93–62	Slovenia	Tallinn
19:00	Scoring by quarter: 22–16, 24–15, 27–20, 20–11
	Pts: Vaaks 20; Rebs: Kotsar 12; Asts: Kotsar 9	Report	Pts: Hrovat 11; Rebs: Omić 8 Asts: Samar 5	Arena: Unibet Arena; Attendance: 6,958; Referees: Wojciech Liszka (POL), Paulo Marques (POR), Tolga Edis (TUR)

3 July 2026	Sweden	87–76	Czechia	Stockholm
19:00	Scoring by quarter: 34–16, 27–19, 18–24, 8–17
	Pts: Larsson 19; Rebs: Klintman 12; Asts: Borg, Pantzar 5	Report	Pts: Sehnal 20; Rebs: Peterka 8 Asts: Sehnal 7	Arena: Hovet; Attendance: 9,000; Referees: Gatis Saliņš (LAT), Geert Jacobs (BEL), Ilias Karpanos (GRE)

6 July 2026	Czechia	75–73	Estonia	Brno
17:00	Scoring by quarter: 24–20, 17–17, 11–16, 23–20
	Pts: Sehnal 15; Rebs: Peterka 7 Asts: Sehnal 8	Report	Pts: Kotsar, Vaaks 19; Rebs: Kotsar 9 Asts: Vaaks 5	Arena: Starez Aréna Vodova; Attendance: 2,913; Referees: Yohan Rosso (FRA), Georgios Poursanidis (GRE), Roko Hordov (CRO)

6 July 2026	Slovenia	79–88	Sweden	Ljubljana
20:00	Scoring by quarter: 24–30, 21–20, 13–19, 21–19
	Pts: Joksimović 22; Rebs: Radović 8 Asts: Prepelič 6	Report	Pts: Larsson 31; Rebs: Birgander 13; Asts: Pantzar 8	Arena: Arena Stožice; Attendance: 3,500; Referees: Fernando Calatrava (ESP), Yener Yılmaz (TUR), Łukasz Jankowski (POL)

=== Second round ===
The qualified teams will be divided into four groups and play the other three teams from the other group twice. Group A will be paired with Group B, Group C with Group D, Group E with Group F, Group G with Group H. All results from the first round will be carried over.

==== Group I ====
Pos	Team	Pld	W	L	PF	PA	PD	Pts	Qualification
1	Ukraine	8	6	2	684	624	+60	14	2027 FIBA Basketball World Cup
2	Spain	8	5	3	721	630	+91	13	2027 FIBA Basketball World Cup
3	Georgia	8	5	3	684	661	+23	13	2027 FIBA Basketball World Cup
4	Portugal	8	4	4	670	636	+34	12	
5	Greece	8	4	4	617	596	+21	12	
6	Montenegro	8	4	4	574	633	−59	12	

Updated to game(s) played on 31 August 2026. Source: FIBA
Rules for classification: 1) Points; 2) Head-to-head results; 3) Points difference; 4) Points scored.

28 August 2026	Georgia	101–74	Montenegro	Tbilisi
19:30	Scoring by quarter: 27–17, 21–25, 29–25, 24–7
	Pts: Shengelia 24; Rebs: Bitadze 8 Asts: Reed 8	Report	Pts: Ferrell 12; Rebs: Radović, Šuškavčević 6 Asts: Ferrell 4	Arena: Tbilisi Arena; Attendance: 8,222; Referees: Yohan Rosso (FRA), Gintaras Mačiulis (LTU), Elvis Binders-Čoders (LAT)

28 August 2026	Ukraine	82–76	Greece	Riga, Latvia
19:00	Scoring by quarter: 24–19, 16–18, 24–22, 18–17
	Pts: Kovliar 18; Rebs: three players 6 Asts: three players 4	Report	Pts: Calathes 17; Rebs: Mitoglou, Papanikolaou 6 Asts: Calathes 8	Arena: Xiaomi Arena; Attendance: 900; Referees: Boris Krejić (SLO), Péter Praksch (HUN), Ventsislav Velikov (BUL)

28 August 2026	Spain	89–95	Portugal	Zaragoza
21:00	Scoring by quarter: 14–21, 27–26, 30–24, 18–24
	Pts: Brizuela 19; Rebs: J. Hernangómez 7 Asts: Brizuela 5	Report	Pts: Williams 22; Rebs: Queta 9 Asts: Lisboa 4	Arena: Pabellón Príncipe Felipe; Attendance: 6,103; Referees: Gatis Saliņš (LAT), Juozas Barkauskas (LTU), Mehmet Şahin (TUR)

31 August 2026	Greece	108–106(OT)	Spain	Athens
19:00	Scoring by quarter: 19–20, 24–22, 24–16, 19–28, Overtime: 22–20
	Pts: Dorsey, Mitoglou 29; Rebs: Mitoglou 7 Asts: Calathes 8	Report	Pts: Parra 18; Rebs: Mara 13; Asts: Cárdenas 8	Arena: Telekom Center Athens; Attendance: 17,677; Referees: Wojciech Liszka (POL), Martin Vulić (CRO), Michał Proc (POL)

31 August 2026	Portugal	90–98	Georgia	Matosinhos
19:00	Scoring by quarter: 24–16, 18–25, 24–29, 24–28
	Pts: Queta 20; Rebs: Queta 11; Asts: Lisboa 5	Report	Pts: Shengelia 26; Rebs: Mamukelashvili, Shengelia 6 Asts: Reed 6	Arena: Centro de Desportos e Congressos de Matosinhos; Attendance: 4,158; Referees: Gvidas Gedvilas (LTU), Valentin Oliot (FRA), Dariusz Zapolski (POL)

31 August 2026	Montenegro	89–98	Ukraine	Podgorica
20:30	Scoring by quarter: 18–19, 22–27, 22–26, 27–26
	Pts: Ferrell 22; Rebs: Šuškavčević 8 Asts: Kljajić 6	Report	Pts: Mykhailiuk 23; Rebs: Skapintsev 7 Asts: Bobrov, Kovliar 5	Arena: Morača Sports Center; Attendance: 3,447; Referees: Mārtiņš Kozlovskis (LAT), Lorenzo Baldini (ITA), Edgard Ceccarelli (FRA)

26 November 2026	Montenegro	vs.	Spain	Podgorica
19:00
		Report		Arena: Morača Sports Center

26 November 2026	Greece	vs.	Georgia	Athens
20:00
		Report		Arena: Telekom Center Athens

26 November 2026	Portugal	vs.	Ukraine	Matosinhos
19:00
		Report		Arena: Centro de Desportos e Congressos de Matosinhos

29 November 2026	Georgia	vs.	Portugal	Tbilisi
19:30
		Report		Arena: Tbilisi Arena

29 November 2026	Ukraine	vs.	Montenegro	Riga, Latvia
18:30
		Report		Arena: Xiaomi Arena

29 November 2026	Spain	vs.	Greece	Santiago de Compostela
18:00
		Report		Arena: Pavillón Multiusos Fontes do Sar

26 February 2027	Portugal	vs.	Spain
		Report

26 February 2027	Greece	vs.	Ukraine
		Report

26 February 2027	Montenegro	vs.	Georgia
		Report

1 March 2027	Spain	vs.	Montenegro
		Report

1 March 2027	Ukraine	vs.	Portugal
		Report

1 March 2027	Georgia	vs.	Greece
		Report

==== Group J ====
Pos	Team	Pld	W	L	PF	PA	PD	Pts	Qualification
1	Turkey (A)	8	8	0	735	581	+154	16	2027 FIBA Basketball World Cup
2	Serbia	8	6	2	697	625	+72	14	2027 FIBA Basketball World Cup
3	Italy	8	5	3	664	615	+49	13	2027 FIBA Basketball World Cup
4	Lithuania	8	4	4	687	677	+10	12	
5	Bosnia and Herzegovina	8	3	5	625	617	+8	11	
6	Iceland	8	3	5	650	750	−100	11	

Updated to game(s) played on 31 August 2026. Source: FIBA
Rules for classification: 1) Points; 2) Head-to-head results; 3) Points difference; 4) Points scored.
(A) Advance to a further round

28 August 2026	Turkey	94–66	Lithuania	Istanbul
21:00	Scoring by quarter: 27–13, 28–21, 20–13, 19–19
	Pts: Osman 22; Rebs: Bona 7 Asts: Hazer 6	Report	Pts: Olisevičius 11; Rebs: Blaževič 14; Asts: Stenionis 6	Arena: Basketball Development Center; Attendance: 5,921; Referees: Wojciech Liszka (POL), Fernando Calatrava (ESP), Josip Jurčević (CRO)

28 August 2026	Serbia	102–73	Iceland	Belgrade
20:00	Scoring by quarter: 25–27, 27–15, 18–19, 32–12
	Pts: Tanasković 23; Rebs: Jokić 13; Asts: Gudurić, Jokić 6	Report	Pts: Friðriksson 19; Rebs: Guðmundsson 10; Asts: Friðriksson 5	Arena: Belgrade Arena; Attendance: 12,384; Referees: Luis Castillo (ESP), Valentin Oliot (FRA), Zdenko Tomašovič (SVK)

28 August 2026	Bosnia and Herzegovina	78–76	Italy	Tuzla
20:00	Scoring by quarter: 18–17, 16–10, 24–27, 20–22
	Pts: Nurkić 25; Rebs: Nurkić 13; Asts: Gegić 4	Report	Pts: Fontecchio, Mannion 14; Rebs: Fontecchio, Melli 6 Asts: Mannion 6	Arena: Mejdan Hall; Attendance: 4,850; Referees: Mārtiņš Kozlovskis (LAT), Michał Proć (POL), Edgard Ceccarelli (FRA)

31 August 2026	Lithuania	78–73	Bosnia and Herzegovina	Vilnius
18:30	Scoring by quarter: 20–23, 22–23, 19–12, 17–15
	Pts: Tubelis 23; Rebs: Blaževič 6 Asts: Marčiulionis, Žemaitis 5	Report	Pts: Nurkić 20; Rebs: Kamenjaš 9 Asts: Atić 6	Arena: Arena Vilnius; Attendance: 4,989; Referees: Yohan Rosso (FRA), Mihkel Männiste (EST), Geert Jacobs (BEL)

31 August 2026	Italy	64–76	Serbia	Pesaro
19:30	Scoring by quarter: 19–20, 12–20, 23–17, 10–19
	Pts: Mannion 23; Rebs: Melli 7 Asts: Mannion, Melli 4	Report	Pts: Avramović 20; Rebs: Jokić 8 Asts: Gudurić 4	Arena: Vitrifrigo Arena; Attendance: 9,487; Referees: Ariadna Chueca (ESP), Péter Praksch (HUN), Ritvars Helmšteins (LAT)

31 August 2026	Iceland	73–110	Turkey	Reykjavík
19:30	Scoring by quarter: 14–33, 23–27, 19–20, 17–30
	Pts: Hermannsson, Pálsson 11; Rebs: Hlinason 9 Asts: Friðriksson 5	Report	Pts: Bitim, Osman 17; Rebs: Bona 10; Asts: Flynn 8	Arena: Laugardalshöll; Attendance: 1,873; Referees: Antonio Conde (ESP), Andris Aunkrogers (LAT), Elvis Binders-Čoders (LAT)

26 November 2026	Lithuania	vs.	Serbia	Klaipėda
18:30
		Report		Arena: Švyturio Arena

26 November 2026	Italy	vs.	Turkey	Rome
20:00
		Report		Arena: PalaEUR

26 November 2026	Iceland	vs.	Bosnia and Herzegovina	Reykjavík
19:30
		Report		Arena: Laugardalshöll

29 November 2026	Turkey	vs.	Iceland	Istanbul
19:00
		Report		Arena: Basketball Development Center

29 November 2026	Bosnia and Herzegovina	vs.	Lithuania	Sarajevo
18:00
		Report		Arena: Juan Antonio Samaranch Olympic Hall

29 November 2026	Serbia	vs.	Italy	Belgrade
19:00
		Report		Arena: Aleksandar Nikolić Hall

26 February 2027	Lithuania	vs.	Turkey
		Report

26 February 2027	Iceland	vs.	Serbia
		Report

26 February 2027	Italy	vs.	Bosnia and Herzegovina
		Report

1 March 2027	Turkey	vs.	Italy
		Report

1 March 2027	Serbia	vs.	Lithuania
		Report

1 March 2027	Bosnia and Herzegovina	vs.	Iceland
		Report

==== Group K ====
Pos	Team	Pld	W	L	PF	PA	PD	Pts	Qualification
1	Croatia	8	7	1	809	614	+195	15	2027 FIBA Basketball World Cup
2	Poland	8	7	1	766	658	+108	15	2027 FIBA Basketball World Cup
3	Germany	8	7	1	749	657	+92	15	2027 FIBA Basketball World Cup
4	Latvia	8	4	4	667	650	+17	12	
5	Netherlands (E)	8	2	6	672	686	−14	10	
6	Israel (E)	8	2	6	634	668	−34	10	

Updated to game(s) played on 30 August 2026. Source: FIBA
Rules for classification: 1) Points; 2) Head-to-head results; 3) Points difference; 4) Points scored.
(E) Eliminated

27 August 2026	Croatia	115–80	Latvia	Zadar
20:00	Scoring by quarter: 23–14, 37–27, 25–16, 30–23
	Pts: Hezonja 28; Rebs: Šarić 9 Asts: Hezonja 7	Report	Pts: Lomažs 23; Rebs: five players 3 Asts: Strautiņš 3	Arena: Krešimir Ćosić Hall; Attendance: 7,306; Referees: Ariadna Chueca (ESP), Georgios Poursanidis (GRE), Ioannis Agrafiotis (GRE)

27 August 2026	Germany	99–83	Netherlands	Cologne
20:00	Scoring by quarter: 38–31, 26–19, 18–16, 17–17
	Pts: Schröder 23; Rebs: Olinde 7 Asts: Schröder 6	Report	Pts: Franke 24; Rebs: D. N'Guessan 6 Asts: Van der Vuurst 6	Arena: Lanxess Arena; Attendance: 15,309; Referees: Gvidas Gedvilas (LTU), Yener Yılmaz (TUR), Geert Jacobs (BEL)

27 August 2026	Israel	86–106	Poland	Riga, Latvia
21:00	Scoring by quarter: 15–23, 27–32, 18–25, 26–26
	Pts: Sorkin 26; Rebs: Segev, Sorkin 5 Asts: Blatt 10	Report	Pts: Ponitka 24; Rebs: Sokołowski 7 Asts: Ponitka 9	Arena: Xiaomi Arena; Attendance: 100; Referees: Petar Pešić (SRB), Mihkel Männiste (EST), Andrea Bongiorni (ITA)

30 August 2026	Netherlands	99–101	Croatia	Almere
14:30	Scoring by quarter: 31–22, 27–22, 19–32, 22–25
	Pts: Van der Vuurst 23; Rebs: Franke, Mast 5 Asts: Van der Vuurst 8	Report	Pts: Šarić, Zubac 24; Rebs: Zubac 11; Asts: Šarić 8	Arena: Topsportcentrum; Attendance: 3,108; Referees: Paulo Marques (POR), Fernando Calatrava (ESP), Tolga Edis (TUR)

30 August 2026	Poland	94–96(OT)	Germany	Gdańsk
14:45	Scoring by quarter: 15–28, 16–13, 27–29, 25–13, Overtime: 11–13
	Pts: Ponitka 20; Rebs: Olejniczak 10; Asts: Pluta, Ponitka 5	Report	Pts: Schröder 18; Rebs: Thiemann 12; Asts: Schröder 5	Arena: Ergo Arena; Attendance: 10,094; Referees: Ademir Zurapović (BIH), Boris Krejić (SLO), Gintaras Mačiulis (LTU)

30 August 2026	Latvia	85–70	Israel	Riga
19:00	Scoring by quarter: 21–22, 20–19, 26–17, 18–12
	Pts: Strautiņš 29; Rebs: Čavars 9 Asts: Lomažs 6	Report	Pts: Madar 15; Rebs: Segev 7 Asts: Madar 5	Arena: Xiaomi Arena; Attendance: 10,321; Referees: Luis Castillo (ESP), Ventsislav Velikov (BUL), Viola Györgyi (NOR)

27 November 2026	Latvia	vs.	Germany	Riga
19:30
		Report		Arena: Xiaomi Arena

27 November 2026	Netherlands	vs.	Israel	The Hague
20:00
		Report		Arena: Sportcampus Zuiderpark

27 November 2026	Poland	vs.	Croatia	Gliwice
20:45
		Report		Arena: PreZero Arena Gliwice

30 November 2026	Israel	vs.	Latvia	Riga, Latvia
19:30
		Report		Arena: Xiaomi Arena

30 November 2026	Germany	vs.	Poland	Frankfurt
19:30
		Report		Arena: Süwag Energie ARENA

30 November 2026	Croatia	vs.	Netherlands	Zagreb
20:00
		Report		Arena: Dražen Petrović Basketball Hall

25 February 2027	Latvia	vs.	Croatia
		Report

25 February 2027	Netherlands	vs.	Germany
		Report

25 February 2027	Poland	vs.	Israel
		Report

28 February 2027	Croatia	vs.	Poland
		Report

28 February 2027	Germany	vs.	Latvia
		Report

28 February 2027	Israel	vs.	Netherlands
		Report

==== Group L ====
Pos	Team	Pld	W	L	PF	PA	PD	Pts	Qualification
1	France	8	7	1	681	573	+108	15	2027 FIBA Basketball World Cup
2	Finland	8	5	3	645	634	+11	13	2027 FIBA Basketball World Cup
3	Slovenia	8	4	4	672	670	+2	12	2027 FIBA Basketball World Cup
4	Hungary	8	4	4	650	653	−3	12	
5	Sweden	8	4	4	649	668	−19	12	
6	Estonia	8	3	5	643	664	−21	11	

Updated to game(s) played on 30 August 2026. Source: FIBA
Rules for classification: 1) Points; 2) Head-to-head results; 3) Points difference; 4) Points scored.

27 August 2026	Finland	81–86	Sweden	Helsinki
18:30	Scoring by quarter: 20–23, 21–21, 20–20, 20–22
	Pts: Nkamhoua 19; Rebs: Jantunen 7 Asts: three players 3	Report	Pts: Larsson 31; Rebs: Birgander, Klintman 10; Asts: Håkanson 7	Arena: Veikkaus Arena; Attendance: 12,401; Referees: Ademir Zurapović (BIH), Lorenzo Baldini (ITA), Ritvars Helmšteins (LAT)

27 August 2026	Hungary	85–67	Estonia	Miskolc
18:00	Scoring by quarter: 13–14, 24–20, 26–22, 22–11
	Pts: Perl 22; Rebs: Reuvers 8 Asts: Somogyi 5	Report	Pts: Kullamäe 26; Rebs: Raieste 6 Asts: Suurorg 4	Arena: DVTK Aréna; Attendance: 1,800; Referees: Martin Vulić (CRO), Martin Horozov (BUL), Çisil Güngör (TUR)

27 August 2026	France	92–67	Slovenia	Paris
20:30	Scoring by quarter: 31–17, 23–18, 19–15, 19–17
	Pts: Wembanyama 22; Rebs: Wembanyama 9 Asts: Strazel 6	Report	Pts: Glas, Krampelj 10; Rebs: Omić 11; Asts: Samar 5	Arena: Accor Arena; Attendance: 15,831; Referees: Antonio Conde (ESP), Paulo Marques (POR), Andris Aunkrogers (LAT)

30 August 2026	Sweden	69–84	France	Stockholm
17:30	Scoring by quarter: 24–20, 14–18, 16–17, 15–29
	Pts: Larsson 23; Rebs: Gaddefors 10; Asts: Birgander 7	Report	Pts: Wembanyama 18; Rebs: Wembanyama 8 Asts: Strazel 6	Arena: Avicii Arena; Attendance: 14,750; Referees: Martin Horozov (BUL), Georgios Poursanidis (GRE), Siniša Prpa (SRB)

30 August 2026	Estonia	67–96	Finland	Tallinn
19:00	Scoring by quarter: 21–21, 14–17, 11–28, 21–30
	Pts: Kullamäe 15; Rebs: three players 5 Asts: Kullamäe 5	Report	Pts: Markkanen 21; Rebs: Markkanen 10; Asts: Nkamhoua 4	Arena: Unibet Arena; Attendance: 7,068; Referees: Petar Pešić (SRB), Yener Yılmaz (TUR), Ioannis Agrafiotis (GRE)

30 August 2026	Slovenia	92–77	Hungary	Ljubljana
20:00	Scoring by quarter: 25–17, 18–19, 32–23, 17–18
	Pts: Prepelič 24; Rebs: Omić 12; Asts: Prepelič 9	Report	Pts: Reuvers 21; Rebs: Reuvers 5 Asts: Somogyi 3	Arena: Tivoli Hall; Attendance: 2,500; Referees: Gatis Saliņš (LAT), Juozas Barkauskas (LTU), Zdenko Tomašovič (SVK)

27 November 2026	Estonia	vs.	France	Tallinn
19:00
		Report		Arena: Unibet Arena

27 November 2026	Sweden	vs.	Hungary	Stockholm
19:00
		Report		Arena: Avicii Arena

27 November 2026	Slovenia	vs.	Finland	Celje
20:00
		Report		Arena: Zlatorog Arena

30 November 2026	Finland	vs.	Estonia	Espoo
18:30
		Report		Arena: Metro Areena

30 November 2026	Hungary	vs.	Slovenia	Szombathely
18:00
		Report		Arena: Schaeffler Arena Savaria

30 November 2026	France	vs.	Sweden	Dijon
20:30
		Report		Arena: Palais des Sports Jean-Michel Geoffroy

25 February 2027	Slovenia	vs.	France
		Report

25 February 2027	Sweden	vs.	Finland
		Report

25 February 2027	Estonia	vs.	Hungary
		Report

28 February 2027	France	vs.	Estonia
		Report

28 February 2027	Finland	vs.	Slovenia
		Report

28 February 2027	Hungary	vs.	Sweden
		Report
