= Denmark men's national basketball team =

Men's national basketball team representing Denmark

Denmark
- FIBA ranking: 60 ▼1 (1 September 2026)
- Joined FIBA: 1951
- FIBA zone: FIBA Europe
- National federation: DBBF
- Coach: Allan Foss
- Nickname(s): De rød-hvide (The Red and White)

Olympic Games
- Appearances: None

FIBA World Cup
- Appearances: None

EuroBasket
- Appearances: 3
- Medals: None

Championship for Small Countries
- Appearances: 1
- Medals: (gold) Gold: (2010)
Home	Away

First international
- Denmark 13–109 Soviet Union (Paris, France; 3 May 1951)

Biggest win
- Denmark 99–51 Cyprus (Copenhagen, Denmark; 26 April 1986)

Biggest defeat
- Soviet Union 118–14 Denmark (Moscow, Soviet Union; 25 May 1953)

The Denmark men's national basketball team (Danish: Danmarks landsbasketballhold) represents Denmark in international basketball competition. The national team is controlled by the Danish Basketball Association.

In the 1950s, the Denmark national team competed regularly at the EuroBasket, the top European tournament. Their best appearance came in their debut appearance in 1951. Since then, the team has struggled to maintain consistency, but won gold at the European Championship for Small Countries in 2010. Denmark has yet to qualify to play on the global stage at the FIBA World Cup.

== History ==
=== EuroBasket 1951 ===
Denmark debuted in the European championships at the EuroBasket 1951 in Paris. They went 0–4 in the preliminary round and ended up in last place in their group. In a direct elimination match against Luxembourg, Denmark took a 46–45 lead with 5 seconds left. A final half-court shot by Luxembourg bounced off the rim, giving Denmark its first ever win at the EuroBasket tournament and advancing the team to the first classification round. They picked up another win there, against Scotland, finishing in third place in the group at 1–2. Their third win of the tournament came against Portugal in the 13th–16th place classification semifinal. Denmark then lost to Switzerland in the 13th/14th place match to finish 14th of the 18 teams with a record of 3–7.

=== EuroBasket 1953 ===
Two years later, at the EuroBasket 1953 in Moscow, Denmark did not fare as well. They dropped eight of their matches (three in the preliminary round, three in the first classification round, and the two second-round classification games) on their way to a 16th-place finish out of the 17 teams in the tournament.

=== EuroBasket 1955 ===
At the EuroBasket 1955 in Budapest, Denmark lost all eight of their matches and finished last of the 18 teams at the event.

=== Later years ===
After the EuroBasket 1955, the Danish national team regressed and never qualified for a major tournament again. They did achieve some success on a lower level, at the European Championship for Small Countries, where they won gold in 2010.

== Competitive record ==
=== FIBA World Cup ===
World Cup					Qualification		
Year	Position	Pld	W	L	Pld	W	L
(Argentina) 1950	No national representative						
(Brazil) 1954	Did not qualify						
(Chile) 1959	Did not enter				Did not enter		
(Brazil) 1963	Did not enter				Did not enter		
(Uruguay) 1967	Did not enter				Did not enter		
(Socialist Federal Republic of Yugoslavia) 1970	Did not qualify				EuroBasket served as qualifiers		
(Puerto Rico) 1974	Did not qualify				EuroBasket served as qualifiers		
(Philippines) 1978	Did not qualify				EuroBasket served as qualifiers		
(Colombia) 1982	Did not qualify				EuroBasket served as qualifiers		
(Spain) 1986	Did not enter				Did not enter		
(Argentina) 1990	Did not qualify				EuroBasket served as qualifiers		
(Canada) 1994	Did not qualify				EuroBasket served as qualifiers		
(Greece) 1998	Did not qualify				EuroBasket served as qualifiers		
(United States) 2002	Did not qualify				EuroBasket served as qualifiers		
(Japan) 2006	Did not qualify				EuroBasket served as qualifiers		
(Turkey) 2010	Did not qualify				EuroBasket served as qualifiers		
(Spain) 2014	Did not enter				Did not enter		
(China) 2019	Did not enter				Did not enter		
(Philippines) (Japan) (Indonesia) 2023	Did not qualify				4	0	4
(Qatar) 2027	Did not qualify				10	2	8
(France) 2031	To be determined				To be determined		
Total	0/19				14	2	12

=== Olympic Games ===
Olympic Games					Qualifying		
Year	Position	Pld	W	L	Pld	W	L
(Nazi Germany) 1936	No national representative						
(Finland) 1952	Did not enter						
(Australia) 1956	Did not qualify						
(Italy) 1960	Did not enter				Did not enter		
(Japan) 1964	Did not enter				Did not enter		
(Mexico) 1968	Did not enter				Did not enter		
(West Germany) 1972	Did not qualify				3	0	3
(Canada) 1976	Did not enter				Did not enter		
(Soviet Union) 1980	Did not enter				Did not enter		
(United States) 1984	Did not enter				Did not enter		
(South Korea) 1988	Did not qualify				4	0	4
(Spain) 1992	Did not enter				Did not enter		
1996 to 2016	Did not enter				Did not enter		
(Japan) 2020	Did not enter				Did not enter		
(France) 2024	Did not qualify				Did not qualify		
(United States) 2028	To be determined				To be determined		
Total	0/19				7	0	7

=== Championship for Small Countries ===
FIBA European Championship for Small Countries
Year	Position	Pld	W	L
(Malta) 2010	1st place, gold medalist(s)	5	5	0
Total		5	5	0

=== EuroBasket ===
EuroBasket					Qualification		
Year	Position	Pld	W	L	Pld	W	L
1935 to 1949	No national representative						
(France) 1951	14th	10	3	7			
(Soviet Union) 1953	16th	8	0	8			
(Hungary) 1955	18th	8	0	8			
(Bulgaria) 1957	Did not enter						
(Turkey) 1959	Did not enter						
(Socialist Federal Republic of Yugoslavia) 1961	Did not enter						
(Poland) 1963	Did not enter				Did not enter		
(Soviet Union) 1965	Did not enter				Did not enter		
(Finland) 1967	Did not qualify				3	1	2
(Italy) 1969	Did not qualify				3	0	3
(West Germany) 1971	Did not qualify				4	1	3
(Spain) 1973	Did not qualify				6	1	5
(Socialist Federal Republic of Yugoslavia) 1975	Did not enter				Did not enter		
(Belgium) 1977	Did not qualify				5	2	3
(Italy) 1979	Did not qualify				4	1	3
(Czechoslovakia) 1981	Did not qualify				4	2	2
(France) 1983	Did not enter				Did not enter		
(West Germany) 1985	Did not qualify				4	3	1
(Greece) 1987	Did not qualify				4	2	2
(Socialist Federal Republic of Yugoslavia) 1989	Did not qualify				3	1	2
(Italy) 1991	Did not qualify				4	1	3
(Germany) 1993	Did not qualify				10	3	7
(Greece) 1995	Did not enter				Did not enter		
(Spain) 1997	Did not qualify				5	2	3
(France) 1999	Did not qualify				15	5	10
(Turkey) 2001	Did not qualify				5	1	4
(Sweden) 2003	Did not qualify				15	4	11
(Serbia and Montenegro) 2005	Division B				6	4	2
(Spain) 2007	Did not qualify				14	2	12
(Poland) 2009	Division B				8	0	8
(Lithuania) 2011	Did not enter				Did not enter		
(Slovenia) 2013	Did not enter				Did not enter		
(France) (Croatia) (Germany) (Latvia) 2015	Did not qualify				12	2	10
(Finland) (Israel) (Romania) (Turkey) 2017	Did not qualify				6	2	4
(Czech Republic) (Georgia (country)) (Italy) (Germany) 2022	Did not qualify				18	6	12
(Cyprus) (Finland) (Poland) (Latvia) 2025	Did not qualify				20	9	11
(Estonia) (Greece) (Slovenia) (Spain) 2029	To be determined				In progress		
Total	3/36	26	3	23	178	61	117

== Results and fixtures ==
Win Loss

=== 2025 ===
27 November 2025 2027 FIBA World Cup qualifiers – 1st round	Denmark	64–74	Spain	Farum, Denmark
18:30 (UTC+1)	Scoring by quarter: 23–25, 10–20, 14–15, 17–14
	Pts: Jensen 20; Rebs: Larsen 8 Asts: Jensen, Pedersen 3	Boxscore	Pts: Fernández 15; Rebs: Osobor, Paulí 8 Asts: Cárdenas 4	Arena: Farum Arena; Attendance: 2,630; Referees: Mārtiņš Kozlovskis (LAT), Michał Proc (POL), Blaž Zupančič (SVN)

30 November 2025 2027 FIBA World Cup qualifiers – 1st round	Ukraine	88–71	Denmark	Riga, Latvia
19:00 (UTC+2)	Scoring by quarter: 18–20, 28–16, 27–10, 15–25
	Pts: Kovliar 28; Rebs: Bobrov 11; Asts: Kovliar 11	Boxscore	Pts: Erikstrup 21; Rebs: Erikstrup, Larsen 7 Asts: Jensen 10	Arena: Xiaomi Arena; Attendance: 500; Referees: Petar Pešić (SRB), Ilias Kounellis (CYP), Ioannis Tsibouris (GRE)

=== 2026 ===
27 February 2026 2027 FIBA World Cup qualifiers – 1st round	Denmark	71–89	Georgia	Farum, Denmark
18:30 (UTC+1)	Scoring by quarter: 12–12, 20–27, 15–38, 24–12
	Pts: Jensen 15; Rebs: Knudsen, Pedersen 8 Asts: Knudsen 4	Boxscore	Pts: Shengelia 24; Rebs: Shengelia 7 Asts: Reed, Shengelia 5	Arena: Farum Arena; Attendance: 1,908; Referees: Péter Praksch (HUN), Carsten Straube (GER), Valerio Grigioni (ITA)

2 March 2026 2027 FIBA World Cup qualifiers – 1st round	Georgia	89–60	Denmark	Tbilisi, Georgia
21:00 (UTC+4)	Scoring by quarter: 21–17, 22–14, 30–18, 16–11
	Pts: Reed 29; Rebs: Shengelia 11; Asts: Reed 8	Boxscore	Pts: Klussmann 17; Rebs: Heede-Andersen 9 Asts: Jensen 5	Arena: Tbilisi Arena; Attendance: 7,100; Referees: Georgios Poursanidis (GRE), Çisil Güngör (TUR), Elvis Binders-Čoders (LAT)

2 July 2026 2027 FIBA World Cup qualifiers – 1st round	Spain	109–81	Denmark	Madrid, Spain
19:00 (UTC+2)	Scoring by quarter: 24–19, 27–22, 31–14, 27–26
	Pts: Oriola 20; Rebs: Oriola, Pradilla 6 Asts: Cárdenas 8	Boxscore	Pts: Ballisager-Webb 14; Rebs: Ballisager-Webb 7 Asts: Heede-Andersen 6	Arena: Caja Mágica; Attendance: 6,685; Referees: Boris Krejić (SVN), Valerio Grigioni (ITA), Silvia Marziali (ITA)

5 July 2026 2027 FIBA World Cup qualifiers – 1st round	Denmark	69–99	Ukraine	Farum, Denmark
15:00 (UTC+2)	Scoring by quarter: 25–22, 12–31, 19–24, 13–22
	Pts: Erichsen 14; Rebs: Erichsen 7 Asts: Heede-Andersen 7	Boxscore	Pts: Mykhailiuk 30; Rebs: Kovliar 7 Asts: Kovliar 8	Arena: Farum Arena; Attendance: 1,317; Referees: Zafer Yılmaz (TUR), Orhan Çağrı Hekimoğlu (TUR), Rainis Värv (EST)

27 August 2026 EuroBasket 2029 pre-qualifiers – 2nd round	Denmark	78–89	Romania	Farum, Denmark
18:30 (UTC+2)	Scoring by quarter: 10–22, 23–16, 20–27, 25–24
	Pts: Dibba 21; Rebs: Dibba, Pedersen 7 Asts: Lundberg 6	Boxscore	Pts: Russell 34; Rebs: Cățe 8 Asts: Diculescu, Russell 6	Arena: Farum Arena; Attendance: 1,375; Referees: Valerio Grigioni (ITA), Tomasz Łangowski (POL), Pierre Landy (FRA)

26 November 2026 EuroBasket 2029 pre-qualifiers – 2nd round	Bulgaria	vs.	Denmark	Sofia, Bulgaria
19:00 (UTC+2)
		Boxscore		Arena: Arena Sofia

29 November 2026 EuroBasket 2029 pre-qualifiers – 2nd round	Romania	vs.	Denmark	Timișoara, Romania
18:00 (UTC+2)
		Boxscore		Arena: Constantin Jude Sports Hall

=== 2027 ===
28 February 2027 EuroBasket 2029 pre-qualifiers – 2nd round	Denmark	vs.	Bulgaria	Denmark
--:-- (UTC+1)
		Boxscore

== Team ==
=== Current roster ===
Roster for the EuroBasket 2029 Pre-Qualifiers match on 27 August 2026 against Romania.

Denmark men's national basketball team roster
Players
Coaches

Pos.	No.	Name	Age – Date of birth	Height	Club	Ctr.
PF	0	Bakary Dibba	24 – 23 October 2001	2.01 m (6 ft 7 in)	Breogán	(Spain)
G	1	Iffe Lundberg	31 – 4 December 1994	1.93 m (6 ft 4 in)	Maccabi Tel Aviv	(Israel)
SF	3	Sylvester Pedersen	28 – 27 May 1998	2.01 m (6 ft 7 in)	Bakken Bears	(Denmark)
SF	8	Gabriel Vogel	21 – 18 May 2005	1.99 m (6 ft 6 in)	Svendborg Rabbits	(Denmark)
PG	12	Adam Heede-Andersen	30 – 4 July 1996	1.87 m (6 ft 2 in)	Svendborg Rabbits	(Denmark)
C	13	David Kristensen	28 – 25 August 1998	2.08 m (6 ft 10 in)	Zamora	(Spain)
C	15	Zarko Jukic	33 – 28 July 1993	2.02 m (6 ft 8 in)	Ármann	(Iceland)
SG	16	Viggo Rimdal	18 – 10 October 2007	1.96 m (6 ft 5 in)	Copenhagen	(Denmark)
C	22	Jermaine Ballisager-Webb	23 – 22 February 2003	2.13 m (7 ft 0 in)	Brno	(Czech Republic)
PG	35	Oscar Jørgensen	27 – 29 December 1998	1.85 m (6 ft 1 in)	Bakken Bears	(Denmark)
G	71	Jonathan Klussmann	23 – 6 October 2002	1.88 m (6 ft 2 in)	Artland Dragons	(Germany)
G/F	88	Gustav Drejer	17 – 21 February 2009	2.06 m (6 ft 9 in)	Manresa	(Spain)

Head coach

- (Denmark) Allan Foss

Assistant coach(es)

- (Iceland) Lárus Jónsson
- (Denmark) Emil Svendsen

Legend

- (C) Team captain
- Club – describes last
  club before the competition
- Age – describes age
  on 27 August 2026

=== Depth chart ===
Pos.	Starting 5	Bench 1	Bench 2
C	Jermaine Ballisager-Webb	David Kristensen
PF	Bakary Dibba	Zarko Jukic	Gustav Drejer
SF	Sylvester Pedersen	Viggo Rimdal	Gabriel Vogel
SG	Iffe Lundberg	Jonathan Klussmann
PG	Adam Heede-Andersen	Oscar Jørgensen

== Head coach position ==
- (Belgium) Per Huyghebaert – (1991–1994)
- (Denmark) Allan Foss – (2004–2009)
- (United States) / (Denmark) Peter Hoffman – (2010–2011)
- (Finland) Pieti Poikola – (2013–2016)
- (Israel) Erez Bittman – (2017–2021)
- (Croatia) Arnel Dedić – (2021–2022)
- (Denmark) Allan Foss – (2022–present)

== Past rosters ==
1951 EuroBasket: finished 14th among 18 teams

3 Knud Lundberg, 4 Knud Norskov, 5 Erik Korsbjerg, 6 Erik Wilbek, 7 Peter Tantholdt, 8 Belger Can, 9 Bent Sondergaard, 10 Erik Melbye, 11 Sven Thomsen, 12 John Christensen, 13 Ove Nielsen, 14 Kai Sogaard, 15 Erik Carlsen, 16 Niels Mygind (Coach: ?)

1953 EuroBasket: finished 16th among 17 teams

3 Kai Sorensen, 4 Knud Norskov, 5 Knud Lundberg, 6 Peter Tantholdt, 7 John Christensen, 8 Erik Madsen, 10 Torben Starup-Hansen, 11 Ivan Rasmussen, 12 Ove Nielsen, 13 Erik Wilbek, 14 Per Meilsøe, 15 Willi Mouritsen, 16 John Nielsen (Coach: ?)

1955 EuroBasket: finished 18th among 18 teams

3 Kai Sogaard, 4 Erik Korsbjerg, 5 Peter Tantholdt, 6 Per Meilsøe, 7 An Lillelund, 8 Ivan Rasmussen, 9 Ove Nielsen, 10 T Storup, 11 P Hintz, 12 T Malmquist, 13 Willi Mouritsen, 14 S Sparre (Coach: ?)

== Kit ==
=== Manufacturer ===
- 2018–present: Spalding

== See also ==
- Sport in Denmark
- Denmark women's national basketball team
- Denmark men's national under-20 basketball team
- Denmark men's national under-18 basketball team
- Denmark men's national under-16 basketball team
- Denmark men's national 3x3 team
