= Yoan Granvorka =

Swiss-French basketball player

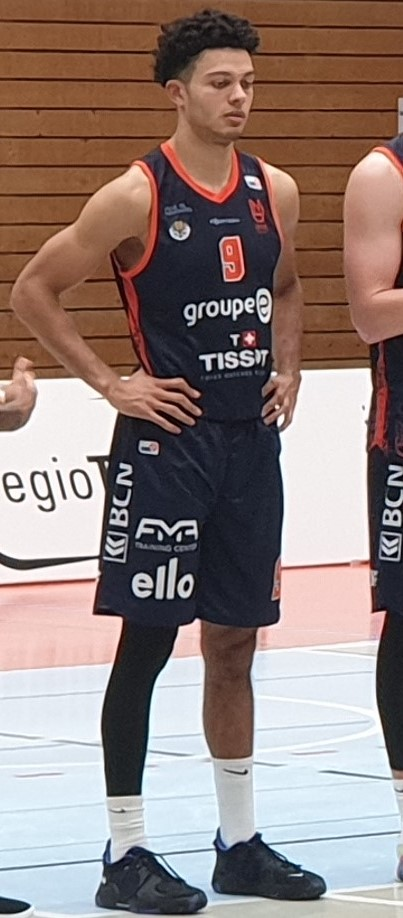
- Granvorka with Union Neuchâtel in 2021

Free Agent
- Position: Forward

Personal information
- Born: 9 June 1997 (age 29) Morges, Switzerland
- Listed height: 2.01 m (6 ft 7 in)

Career information
- Playing career: 2017–present

Career history
- 2017–2018: Monthey
- 2018–2022: Union Neuchâtel
- 2022–2023: ESSM Le Portel
- 2023–2024: Rouen Métropole Basket
- 2024–2025: Feyenoord Basketball

Yoan Granvorka (born 9 June 1997) is a Swiss-French professional basketball player who last played for Zeeuw & Zeeuw Feyenoord of the BNXT League. Standing at 2.01 m (6 ft 7 in), he usually plays as forward.

== Professional career ==
Granvorka started his career playing in the youth ranks of SLUC Nancy Basket. On 15 August 2018, Granvorka signed with BBC Monthey. In April 2018, Granvorka declared for the 2018 NBA draft.

On 22 June 2022, he has signed with ESSM Le Portel of the French LNB Pro A.

== International career ==
Granvorka has represented the French national basketball team under-20.
