= Farum Arena =

Sports venue in Denmark

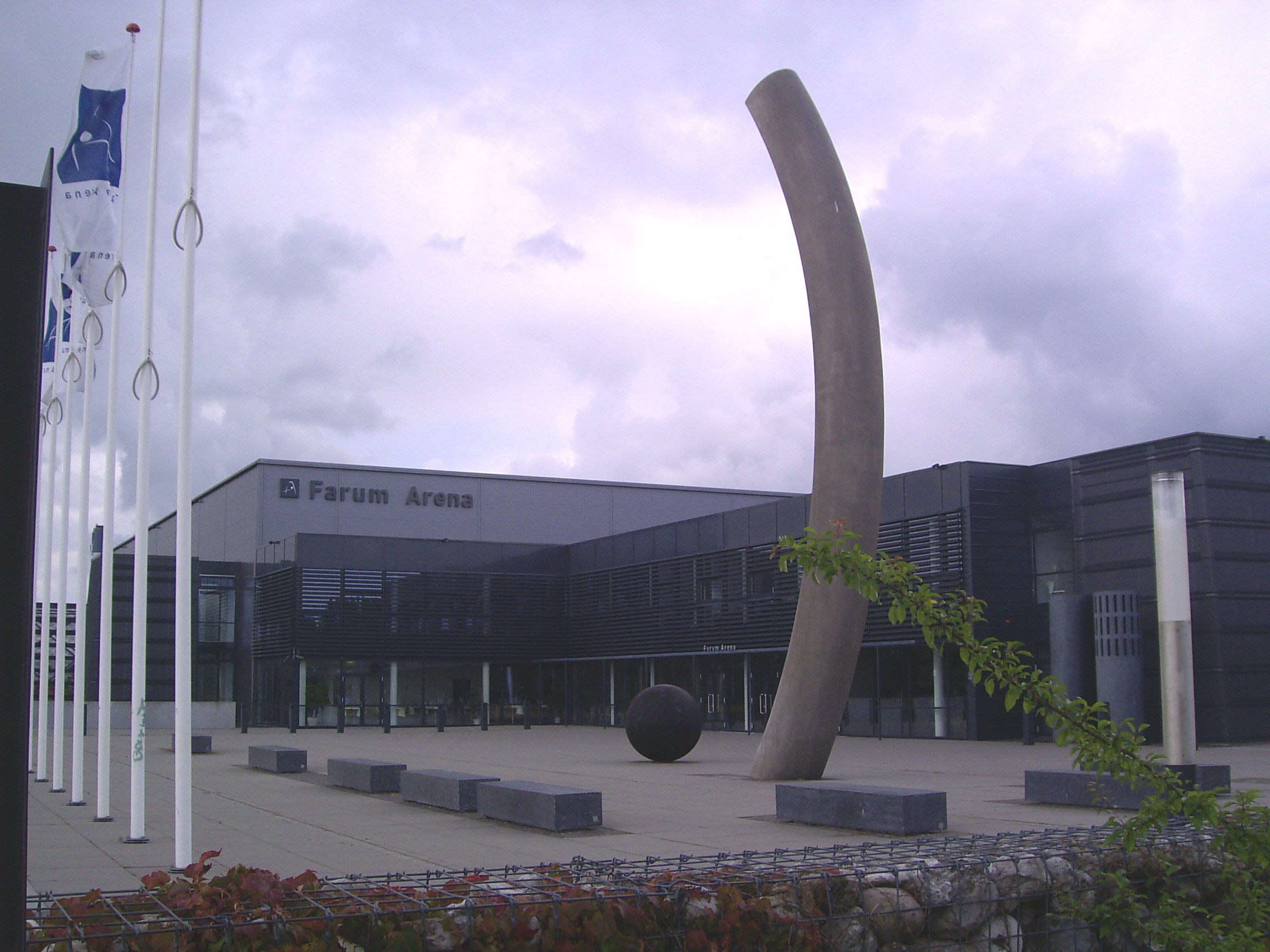
- Interactive map of Farum Arena
- Location: Farum, Capital Region of Denmark; Denmark
- Coordinates: 55.8146°N 12.3927°E
- Owner: Furesø Municipality
- Operator: Furesø Municipality
- Capacity: 3,000 (handball); 2,900 (tennis)

Construction
- Opened: November 2000
- Cost: 180 million kr

Tenants
- Danish Open (tennis) (2010–present); FC Nordsjælland (handball) (2007–present)

Farum Arena is a multi-purpose arena, located in Furesø Municipality, Capital Region, Denmark. The seating capacity of the arena varies, depending on the event. The arena is part of a sports complex alongside Right to Dream Park. The arena was opened in November 2000, and was later purchased by the Furesø Municipality in July 2007.

The arena has also been used by Denmark national basketball team, the international badminton tournament State Denmark Challenge, LAN parties and e-sports, as well as tennis.

== Sources ==
- Høyer-Kruse, Jens; Ibsen, Bjarne (2014). Undersøgelse af Farum Arena [Study of Farum Arena] (in Danish). Department of Sports Science and Biomechanics, University of Southern Denmark. ISBN 9788793192126.
