= Bakary Dibba =

Danish basketball player (born 2001)

Free Agent
- Position: Power forward

Personal information
- Born: 23 October 2001 (age 24) Copenhagen, Denmark
- Listed height: 2.06 m (6 ft 9 in)

Career information
- Playing career: 2018–present

Career history
- 2018–2019: DBA Copenhagen
- 2019–2021: Copenhagen Basketball
- 2021–2023: Tigers Tübingen
- 2023–2024: PS Karlsruhe Lions
- 2024–2025: MLP Academics Heidelberg
- 2025–2026: CB Breogán

Bakary Dibba is a Danish professional basketball player who last played for CB Breogán of the Spanish Liga ACB. He measures 2.06 meters and plays as power forward.

== Early life ==
As a teenager, he played volleyball.

== Club career ==
At the age of 19, he already made the leap to Copenhagen Basketball in the first Danish league, where he recorded 22 caps with an average of 10 points and 4 rebounds per game. After four years playing in Germany, Dibba headed to Spain's top-tier Liga ACB, signing with CB Breogán.

== National team ==
In 2019, he represented Denmark at the U18 European Championships, where he averaged 12.3 points and 5.9 rebounds per game. Dibba has also been a member of the Danish senior national team since June 2022.
