= Tobias Jensen =

Danish basketball player (born 2004)

Tobias Brahe Jensen
- Jensen with Bayern Munich in 2026

No. 8 – Bayern Munich
- Position: Small forward / shooting guard
- League: BBL; EuroLeague

Personal information
- Born: 8 May 2004 (age 22) Copenhagen, Denmark
- Listed height: 1.98 m (6 ft 6 in)
- Listed weight: 179 lb (81 kg)

Career information
- Playing career: 2021–present

Career history
- 2021–2022: OrangeAcademy
- 2022–2026: Ratiopharm Ulm
- 2022–2024: →OrangeAcademy
- 2026–present: Bayern Munich

Career highlights
- EuroCup Rising Star (2026); German Bundesliga champion (2023)

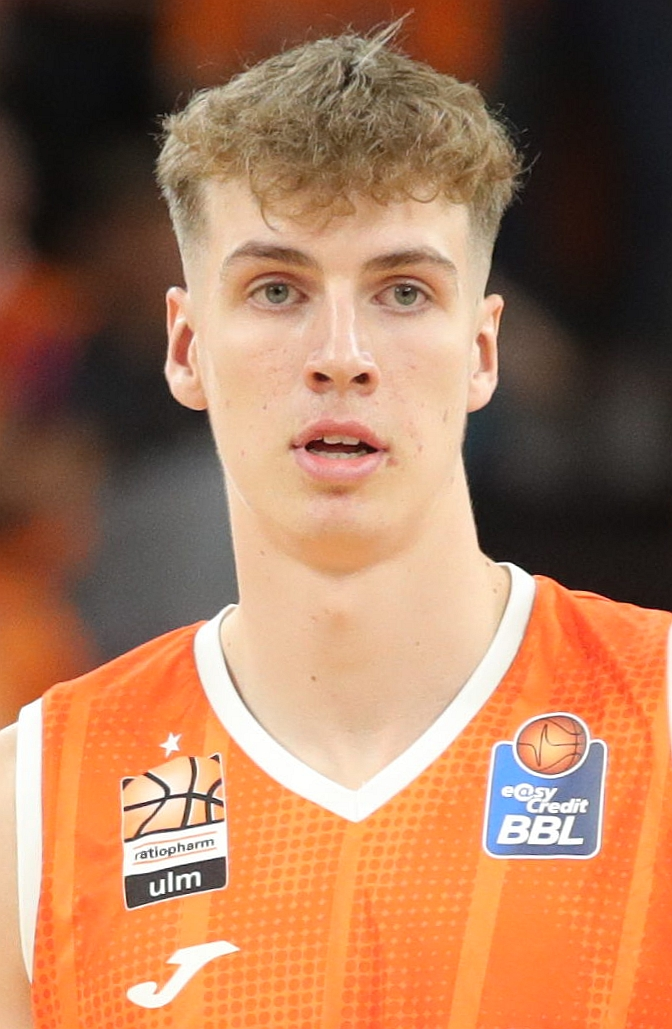
Jensen with Ratiopharm Ulm in 2023

Tobias Brahe Jensen (born 8 May 2004) is a Danish professional basketball player for Bayern Munich of the German Basketball Bundesliga (BBL) and the EuroLeague. He also represents the Denmark national team.

== Professional career ==
Jensen began playing basketball in the youth academy of Bakken Bears, one of Denmark’s leading clubs, before moving to Germany in 2020 to join OrangeAcademy, the ProB affiliate of Ratiopharm Ulm.

He debuted in the German ProB league in February 2021 and made his top-tier debut in the Basketball Bundesliga for Ratiopharm Ulm in November 2022. During the 2022–23 season, he made three league appearances as Ulm won their first-ever BBL title.

In the 2023–24 season, Jensen averaged 2.6 points, 1 rebound, and 1.3 assists over 28 BBL games, and played in the EuroCup and German Cup competitions.

== International career ==
Jensen represented Denmark at the 2022 FIBA U18 European Championship Division B, where he averaged 13.6 points, 6.6 rebounds, and 5.3 assists per game, and was named to the All‑Star Five.

He made his debut for the Denmark senior national team during the EuroBasket 2025 qualification in February 2023 against Norway.
