= Dane Erikstrup =

American basketball player (born 2003)

BC Dubai
- Position: Center

Personal information
- Born: April 3, 2003 (age 23) Portland, Oregon, U.S.
- Listed height: 6 ft 10 in (2.08 m)

Career information
- High school: Beaverton (Beaverton, Oregon)
- College: Cal Poly Pomona (2021–2022); Eastern Washington (2022–2024); Washington State (2024–2025)
- Playing career: 2025–present

Career history
- 2025–2026: Donar
- 2026–present: BC Dubai

Career highlights
- Dutch Cup winner (2026)

Dane Thomas Erikstrup (born April 3, 2003) is an American-Danish professional basketball player for BC Dubai.

== College career ==
In April 2024 Erikstrup joined Washington State University. He achieved an average of 12.2 points and 4,3 rebounds per match.

== Professional career ==
Erikstrup accepted an offer from Donar Groningen from the Netherlands. The club plays in the BNXT League and the ENBL. With Donar he won the Dutch Cup, achieving the first prize of his career. With only 5 matches to go in the regular season, Erikstrup left the team due to personal reasons.

On 22 September 2026 Erikstrup joined BC Dubai.

== International career ==
Erikstrup was a youth international for Denmark. In July 2023 he played his first match with the senior squad.
