= 2019–20 Georgian Superliga =

20th season of the Georgian Superliga

Superliga
- Duration: 30 October 2019 – 13 March 2020
- Teams: 11

The 2019–20 Georgian Superliga is the 20th season of the Georgian Superliga since its establishment. Delta, renamed as Tskhum-Abkhazeti, were the defending champions.

On 13 March 2020, the league was postponed due to the coronavirus pandemic until 6 April. On May 26 Board of the Georgian Basketball Federation announced the cancellation of all basketball tournaments in Georgia.

== Format ==
The regular season consisted of a double-legged round-robin competition where the eight best teams qualified for the playoffs.

== Teams ==
Locations of the 2019–20 Georgian Superliga teams

Vera and Rustavi promoted to the league. Delta changed its name to Tskhum-Abkhazeti.

Team	Location	Arena
Batumi	Batumi	Sports School
Cactus	Tbilisi	Olympic Palace
Dinamo	Tbilisi	Olympic Palace
Kutaisi	Kutaisi	Sports Palace
Mgzavrebi	Tbilisi	Olympic Palace
Olimpi	Tbilisi	Olympic Palace
Rustavi	Rustavi	Chemicals Gym
Titebi	Tbilisi	Olympic Palace
Tskhum Abkhazeti	Tbilisi	Olympic Palace
TSU	Tbilisi	Olympic Palace
Vera	Tbilisi	Olympic Palace

== Regular season ==
=== League table ===
Pos	Team	Pld	W	L	PF	PA	PD	Pts	Qualification or relegation
1	Batumi	15	10	5	1303	1221	+82	25	Qualification to playoffs
2	TSU	15	9	6	1251	1186	+65	24	Qualification to playoffs
3	Vera	15	9	6	1152	1132	+20	24	Qualification to playoffs
4	Kutaisi	15	9	6	1207	1149	+58	24	Qualification to playoffs
5	Olimpi	14	8	6	1079	1106	−27	22	Qualification to playoffs
6	Dinamo	14	8	6	1119	1175	−56	22	Qualification to playoffs
7	Cactus	15	7	8	1136	1157	−21	22	Qualification to playoffs
8	Rustavi	14	6	8	1105	1079	+26	20	Qualification to playoffs
9	Mgzavrebi	15	5	10	1182	1193	−11	20	
10	Titebi	14	5	9	969	1023	−54	19	Qualification to relegation playoffs
11	Tskhum Abkhazeti	14	4	10	1010	1092	−82	18	Relegated

Updated to match(es) played on 8 March 2020. Source:

=== Results ===
Home \ Away	BAT	CAC	DIN	KUT	MGZ	OLI	RUS	TIT	ABK	TSU	VER
Batumi	—	96–93	98–85		70–68	88–81			108–90	96–79	82–79
Cactus	67–85	—	77–79	82–76	80–64	70–74	73–86		74–68	81–73	72–81
Dinamo	81–79		—	84–83		77–91		72–78			74–66
Kutaisi	75–69			—	87–77	89–74	98–82		63–74	75–91	84–88
Mgzavrebi	80–84	84–86	111–70		—		72–84	78–72		76–103	
Olimpi			90–100	60–91	76–73	—		71–56	91–82	89–76	
Rustavi	100–89	78–67	92–96	69–72	80–85	94–59	—	66–71			
Titebi	67–87	67–69	66–73	73–81	66–75			—	81–80	66–85	66–75
Tskhum Abkhazeti		71–67	83–88	69–73	77–75	63–62	58–69	62–78	—	74–85	
TSU	92–90	75–78	87–71	73–84	83–77	74–79	79–64			—	
Vera	84–82		74–69	84–76	75–87	73–82	80–71	49–62	78–59	86–96	—

Updated to match(es) played on 8 March 2020. Source:
Legend: Blue = home team win; Red = away team win.

== Playoffs ==
All the rounds will be played in a best-of-five games format, (2-2-1) format.

=== Bracket ===
Quarter-finals

Semi-finals

Final
Third place

=== Quarter-finals ===
Team 1	Series	Team 2	Game 1	Game 2	Game 3	Game 4	Game 5

=== Semi-finals ===
Team 1	Series	Team 2	Game 1	Game 2	Game 3	Game 4	Game 5

=== Third place match ===
Team 1	Score	Team 2

=== Finals ===
Team 1	Series	Team 2	Game 1	Game 2	Game 3	Game 4	Game 5

== Relegation playoffs ==
The winner of the playoffs between the ninth qualified and the runner-up of the A-League will join the next Superleague season with the second-tier league champion.
