= 2018–19 Georgian Superliga =

19th season of the Georgian Superliga

Superliga
- Duration: 10 November 2018 – May 2019
- Teams: 10

Regular season
- Relegated: Rustavi

Finals
- Champions: Delta (1st title)
- Runners-up: Kutaisi

The 2018–19 Georgian Superliga was the 19th season of the Georgian Superliga since its establishment.

Dinamo Tbilisi were the defending champions.

== Format ==
Regular season consisted in a double-legged round-robin competition where the eight best teams qualified for the playoffs.

== Teams ==
The league was expanded to ten teams. Two clubs have been promoted from A-league, TSU Tbilisi as champion and MIA Academy Titebi as runner-up, and after winning a promotion/relegation playoff against Sokhumi.

== Regular season ==
=== League table ===
Pos	Team	Pld	W	L	PF	PA	PD	Pts	Qualification or relegation
1	Kutaisi	18	14	4	1548	1428	+120	32	Qualification to playoffs
2	Mgzavrebi	18	13	5	1511	1369	+142	31	Qualification to playoffs
3	Delta	18	12	6	1448	1332	+116	30	Qualification to playoffs
4	TSU Hyundai	18	10	8	1489	1471	+18	28	Qualification to playoffs
5	Dinamo	18	10	8	1366	1352	+14	28	Qualification to playoffs
6	Olimpi	18	8	10	1418	1450	−32	26	Qualification to playoffs
7	Batumi	18	8	10	1397	1465	−68	26	Qualification to playoffs
8	MIA Academy Titebi	18	7	11	1463	1488	−25	25	Qualification to playoffs
9	Cactus (O)	18	5	13	1404	1554	−150	23	Qualification to relegation playoffs
10	Rustavi (R)	18	3	15	1333	1468	−135	21	Relegated

(O) Play-off winners; (R) Relegated

=== Results ===
Home \ Away	BAT	CAC	DEL	DIN	KUT	MGZ	TIT	OLI	RUS	TSU
Batumi	—	89–85	69–85	66–79	97–89	76–89	76–86	69–61	87–65	82–71
Cactus	90–81	—	61–83	73–88	83–90	88–102	69–84	78–74	87–80	65–85
Delta	70–78	87–64	—	99–77	91–80	67–70	87–86	64–66	86–79	79–72
Dinamo	73–80	83–70	73–62	—	68–79	71–88	60–73	80–79	77–61	89–98
Kutaisi	88–68	93–84	87–89	81–66	—	78–80	81–77	108–78	87–75	80–73
Mgzavrebi	92–71	94–85	81–74	65–68	82–86	—	87–78	70–83	72–75	96–61
MIA Academy Titebi	89–82	86–71	72–90	62–86	66–75	86–91	—	70–93	96–81	86–93
Olimpi	100–83	89–95	77–72	65–77	82–87	72–84	86–83	—	84–71	73–75
Rustavi	70–73	76–81	62–73	67–62	87–94	71–91	81–86	90–59	—	77–96
TSU Hyundai	83–70	89–75	78–90	84–89	82–85	79–77	99–96	94–97	77–65	—

Legend: Blue = home team win; Red = away team win.

== Playoffs ==
All the rounds will be played in a best-of-five games format, (2-2-1) format.

=== Bracket ===
Quarter-finals
Kutaisi	3
MIA Academy Titebi	1
TSU Hyundai	1
Dinamo	3
Mgzavrebi	3
Batumi	2
Delta	3
Olimpi	0

Semi-finals
Kutaisi	3
Dinamo	2
Mgzavrebi	0
Delta	3

Final
Kutaisi	2
Delta	3
Third place
Mgzavrebi	75
Dinamo	65

=== Quarter-finals ===
Team 1	Series	Team 2	Game 1	Game 2	Game 3	Game 4	Game 5
Kutaisi	3–1	MIA Academy Titebi	93–87	96–95	96–101	93–87	
Mgzavrebi	3–2	Batumi	88–90	75–64	82–88	77–94	97–76
Delta	3–0	Olimpi	69–60	74–69	81–71		
TSU Hyundai	1–3	Dinamo	78–85	87–73	72–90	74–78	

=== Semi-finals ===
Team 1	Series	Team 2	Game 1	Game 2	Game 3	Game 4	Game 5
Kutaisi	3–2	Dinamo	68–60	76–84	76–56	63–71	78–74
Mgzavrebi	0–3	Delta	76–90	67–75	75–98		

=== Third place match ===
Team 1	Score	Team 2
Mgzavrebi	75–65	Dinamo

=== Finals ===
Team 1	Series	Team 2	Game 1	Game 2	Game 3	Game 4	Game 5
Kutaisi	2–3	Delta	83–90	82–70	83–74	75–86	78–82

== Relegation playoffs ==
The winner of the playoffs between the ninth qualified and the runner-up of the A-League will join the next Superleague season with Vera, champion of the second-tiered league.

Team 1	Series	Team 2	Game 1	Game 2	Game 3	Game 4	Game 5
Cactus	3–2	CIU	75–66			69–74	90–69

== Georgian clubs in European competitions ==
Team	Competition	Progress
Dinamo	Champions League	First qualifying round
