= Kote Tugushi =

Georgian basketball player and coach

BC Kutaisi 2010
- Title: Head coach

Personal information
- Born: June 3, 1981 (age 45) Tbilisi, Soviet Union

Career information
- Playing career: 1994–2011
- Position: Guard
- Coaching career: 2011–present

Career history

Playing
- 1994–1998: Vita Tbilisi
- 1999–2001: STU-Geocell Tbilisi
- 2001–2002: KD Slovan
- 2002–2003: STU-Geocell Tbilisi
- 2003–2004: Dinamo Tbilisi
- 2004–2005: Pegah Tehran
- 2005–2006: Gol Gohar Sirjan
- 2006–2007: Energy Invest Rustavi
- 2007–2008: Aviamsheni Tbilisi
- 2008–2010: Azoti Rustavi
- 2010–2011: Armia

Coaching
- 2011 - 2014: Mgzavrebi-Armia
- 2011 - 2017: Georgia (assistant)
- 2014 - 2015: BC MIA Academy
- 2015 - present: BC Kutaisi

Kote Tugushi (Georgian: კოტე ტუღუში), (born June 3, 1983) is a Georgian professional basketball coach and former player. Since 2015, he has coached BC Kutaisi 2010 in Georgia. Also he was an assistant coach of Georgia's national basketball team. As a professional player, he played in Georgia and Iran. After his retirement as a player he won the Georgian Basketball Championship as head coach of BC Armia Tbilisi.
