= Mikheil Berishvili =

Georgian basketball player

No. 17 – BC Kutaisi 2010
- Position: Small forward / power forward
- League: Georgian Superliga

Personal information
- Born: 12 April 1987 (age 39) Tbilisi, Georgian SSR, Soviet Union
- Listed height: 2.04 m (6 ft 8 in)

Career information
- NBA draft: 2008: undrafted
- Playing career: 2008–present

Career history
- 2005-2006: BC TSU Tbilisi
- 2006-2007: Nikora Tbilisi
- 2007-2008: B.C. VITA Tbilisi
- 2008: Tulsa 66ers
- 2008: GSAU Tbilisi
- 2009: CB Prat
- 2009-10: Club Baloncesto Aridane
- 2010-11: Armia Tbilisi
- 2010–2011: BC TSU Tbilisi
- 2011: BC Sokhumi
- 2011–2013: Olimpi Tbilisi
- 2013–2014: Armia Tbilisi
- 2014: Zlatorog Laško
- 2015: BC MIA Academy
- 2015-2016: B.C. VITA Tbilisi
- 2016–2019: Dinamo Tbilisi
- 2018-2021: Al-Shamal Doha
- 2021-2022: BC TSU Tbilisi
- 2022: Air Defence SC
- 2022-2023: BC TSU Tbilisi
- 2023: Nawair SC
- 2023-24: BC Kutaisi 2010

Mikheil Berishvili (Georgian: მიხეილ ბერიშვილი) (born 12 April 1987) is a Georgian basketball player for BC Kutaisi 2010 of the Georgian Superliga and the Georgian national team.

== National team career ==
Berishvili is a member of the Georgian national team since 2008.
