= Besik Lezhava =

Georgian basketball player

No. 7 – Titebi
- Position: Shooting guard
- League: Georgian Superliga

Personal information
- Born: February 21, 1986 (age 40) Tbilisi, Georgian SSR, Soviet Union
- Listed height: 1.92 m (6 ft 4 in)

Career history
- 2003–2004: TSU Tbilisi
- 2004–2005: Dijon Basket
- 2005–2007: TSU Tbilisi
- 2007–2009: Rustavi
- 2009–2010: Basco Batumi
- 2010–2011: MIA Academy
- 2011–2012: Apollon Limassol
- 2012–2013: MIA Academy
- 2013: Armia
- 2013–2015: Dinamo Tbilisi
- 2015–2017: Batumi
- 2017–present: Titebi

Besik Lezhava (Georgian: ბესიკ ლეჟავა) (born February 21, 1986) is a Georgian basketball player for Titebi and the Georgian national team, where he participated at the EuroBasket 2015.
