= Georgia men's national basketball team =

Men's national basketball team representing the country of Georgia

Georgia
- FIBA ranking: 20 (1 September 2026)
- Joined FIBA: 1992
- FIBA zone: FIBA Europe
- National federation: GBF
- Coach: Aleksandar Džikić
- Nickname(s): ჯვაროსნები jvarosnebi (Crusaders)

FIBA World Cup
- Appearances: 1
- Medals: None

EuroBasket
- Appearances: 6
- Medals: None
Home	Away

First international
- Poland 91–68 Georgia (Birmingham, England; 24 May 1995)

Biggest win
- Georgia 103–43 Azerbaijan (Tbilisi, Georgia; 2 September 2001)

Biggest defeat
- Italy 90–43 Georgia (Siena, Italy; 28 February 1998)

The Georgia men's national basketball team (Georgian: საქართველოს ეროვნული საკალათბურთო ნაკრები) represents the country of Georgia in international basketball matches, and is controlled by the Georgian Basketball Federation. Georgia became a member of FIBA in 1992, after they gained independence from the Soviet Union. The national team played their first official match against Poland in 1995.

Georgia's accomplishments on the international level have been clinching qualification to the European Basketball Championship six times. Their best result came at their sixth trip to the tournament in 2025. In 2023, Georgia achieved their first qualification on to the global stage at the FIBA World Cup.

Since 2023, Georgia has had the highest FIBA World Ranking among Caucasus countries.

== History ==
=== Soviet era ===
Until 1991, Georgia was a part of the Soviet Union, with players born in Georgia playing for the Soviet Union national team. Notable players born in Georgia who played for the Soviet Union and won medals at the Olympic Games, FIBA World Cup and EuroBasket include: Nodar Dzhordzhikiya, Otar Korkia, Guram Minashvili, Vladimer Ugrekhelidze, Levan Moseshvili, Zurab Sakandelidze, Mikheil Korkia and Nikolay Deryugin.

=== Independent Georgia ===
After gaining independence from the Soviet Union, on several occasions the Georgian national team unsuccessfully tried to qualify for the EuroBasket, Europe's biggest basketball competition and major tournament. Although the national team did play on the EuroBasket Division B level three times and gained promotion in 2009 after defeating Belarus in play-offs. However, after the expansion of the EuroBasket in 2011 from 16 to 24 teams, Georgia qualified to the competition for the first time.

=== EuroBasket 2011 ===
The national team played five matches in Group D. They finished their preliminary group with an 2–3 record, with wins against Belgium and Ukraine, to advance. In their second round group phase, Georgia lost all five of their matches to finish their maiden voyage to the EuroBasket in 11th place.

=== EuroBasket 2013 ===
After finishing second in qualifying group, Georgia qualified for its second EuroBasket tournament. After a comfortable 84–67 victory in the opening match over Poland, Georgia lost their four remaining matches and finished the tournament with an 1–4 record. To that point, the Eurobasket 2013 was the only tournament in which Georgia could not win more than one match.

=== EuroBasket 2015 ===
Georgia qualified to the EuroBasket for the third successive time in 2015. After three consecutive losses to start the tournament, the national team finally earned their first win in group play against Macedonia 90–75. They followed it up with another victory to end the opening phase of the event against Croatia, 71–58 to move on to the knockout stages for the first time. There they suffered a narrow hard fought defeat to the tournament favourites, and eventual silver medalist Lithuania 81–85.

=== EuroBasket 2017 ===
During the EuroBasket 2017 qualification Georgia topped its group after an 90–84 victory over Montenegro, and qualified to EuroBasket for the fourth successive time. Once the competition began, the national team got off to a quick start, avenging their EuroBasket 2015 knockout stage defeat to Lithuania 79–77. The rest of the group stage didn't go as well for the Georgian side though. As the team could only manage to pullout one more victory against Israel, before falling to Italy to finish the tournament with an 2–3 record and being eliminated.

=== EuroBasket 2022 ===
Georgia was the co-host the EuroBasket 2022, and they automatically qualified for the 2022 finals tournament. This was the fifth successive time that Georgia qualified for the event overall. Tbilisi was one of the host cities, and was used for Group A matches at the brand new Tbilisi Basketball Arena.

=== 2023 FIBA World Cup ===
In February 2023, Georgia was qualified for the finals tournament of 2023 FIBA Basketball World Cup by earning 3rd place in qualifiers. This was the first time that Georgia qualified for the event overall. They lost to Iceland 80-77 in the final Europe Region qualifying game for both teams. However, Iceland needed to win by four points or more to win a tiebreaker over Georgia for the World Cup berth. Both teams finished qualifying with 5-5 records, with the tiebreaker going to Georgia by the slimmest of margins. “Amazing. I’m so happy, man,” said Georgia’s Thaddus McFadden, a Michigan-born guard.

In August 2023, Georgia kept their dream run alive as the debutants booked a trip to the Second Round of the World Cup by dashing the hopes of Venezuela, 70-59 at the Okinawa Arena, Japan. They lost successive matches to both Germany and Austria and ended the journey in World Cup.

=== EuroBasket 2025 ===
On 7 September 2025, Georgia advanced to the quarter-finals of EuroBasket 2025 for the first time in history, with an 80-70 win against France in Riga Arena, Latvia. France had been runner-up at EuroBasket 2022 and the 2024 Summer Olympics. After the win over France, national team veteran Giorgi Shermadini said, “Unbelievable. I’m really happy, congrats to my teammates, everyone, all our fans in Georgia and here. France are amazing, but today we played better in defense and offense.” On 10 September 2025, Georgia lost to Finland in the quarterfinals.

== Competitive record ==
=== FIBA World Cup ===
World Cup					Qualification		
Year	Position	Pld	W	L	Pld	W	L
1950 to 1990	Part of Soviet Union						
(Canada) 1994	Did not enter				Did not enter		
(Greece) 1998	Did not qualify				EuroBasket served as qualifiers		
(United States) 2002	Did not qualify				EuroBasket served as qualifiers		
(Japan) 2006	Did not qualify				EuroBasket served as qualifiers		
(Turkey) 2010	Did not qualify				EuroBasket served as qualifiers		
(Spain) 2014	Did not qualify				EuroBasket served as qualifiers		
(China) 2019	Did not qualify				12	5	7
(Philippines) (Japan) (Indonesia) 2023	16th	5	2	3	12	7	5
(Qatar) 2027	To be determined				In progress		
(France) 2031	To be determined				To be determined		
Total	1/8	5	2	3	24	12	12

=== Olympic Games ===
Olympic Games					Qualifying		
Year	Position	Pld	W	L	Pld	W	L
1948 to 1988	Part of Soviet Union						
(Spain) 1992	Did not enter				Did not enter		
(United States) 1996	Did not enter				Did not enter		
(Australia) 2000	Did not qualify				Did not qualify		
(Greece) 2004	Did not qualify				Did not qualify		
(China) 2008	Did not qualify				Did not qualify		
(United Kingdom) 2012	Did not qualify				Did not qualify		
(Brazil) 2016	Did not qualify				Did not qualify		
(Japan) 2020	Did not qualify				Did not qualify		
(France) 2024	Did not qualify				2	1	1
(United States) 2028	To be determined				To be determined		
Total	0/9				2	1	1

=== EuroBasket ===
EuroBasket					Qualification		
Year	Position	Pld	W	L	Pld	W	L
1947 to 1991	Part of Soviet Union						
(Germany) 1993	Did not enter				Did not enter		
(Greece) 1995	Did not enter				Did not enter		
(Spain) 1997	Did not qualify				15	6	9
(France) 1999	Did not qualify				13	2	11
(Turkey) 2001	Did not qualify				5	2	3
(Sweden) 2003	Did not qualify				11	6	5
(Serbia and Montenegro) 2005	Division B				6	4	2
(Spain) 2007	Division B				8	6	2
(Poland) 2009	Division B				10	9	1
(Lithuania) 2011	11th	8	2	6	8	5	3
(Slovenia) 2013	17th	5	1	4	8	6	2
(France) (Croatia) (Germany) (Latvia) 2015	15th	6	2	4	6	4	2
(Finland) (Israel) (Romania) (Turkey) 2017	17th	5	2	3	6	5	1
(Czech Republic) (Georgia (country)) (Italy) (Germany) 2022	21st	5	1	4	6	4	2
(Cyprus) (Finland) (Poland) (Latvia) 2025	8th	7	3	4	6	3	3
(Estonia) (Greece) (Slovenia) (Spain) 2029	To be determined				To be determined		
Total	6/15	36	11	25	108	62	46

== Results and fixtures ==
Win Loss

=== 2025 ===
27 November 2025 2027 FIBA World Cup qualifiers – 1st round	Georgia	79–92	Ukraine	Tbilisi, Georgia
21:00 (UTC+4)	Scoring by quarter: 23–15, 25–28, 13–23, 18–26
	Pts: D. Sanadze 22; Rebs: Shengelia, Shermadini 6 Asts: Andronikashvili 5	Boxscore	Pts: Kovliar 31; Rebs: Bobrov 15; Asts: Kovliar 6	Arena: Tbilisi Arena; Attendance: 9,000; Referees: Mihkel Männiste (EST), Çisil Güngör (ROU), Orhan Çağrı Hekimoğlu (TUR)

30 November 2025 2027 FIBA World Cup qualifiers – 1st round	Spain	90–61	Georgia	La Laguna, Spain
18:45 (UTC+0)	Scoring by quarter: 19–22, 28–11, 23–13, 20–15
	Pts: Yusta 17; Rebs: Almansa 9 Asts: Yusta 6	Boxscore	Pts: Khatiashvili, Shengelia 10; Rebs: Shengelia 7 Asts: Andronikashvili 4	Arena: Pabellón Insular Santiago Martín; Attendance: 4,603; Referees: Boris Krejić (SVN), Ventsislav Velikov (BUL), Siniša Prpa (SRB)

=== 2026 ===
27 February 2026 2027 FIBA World Cup qualifiers – 1st round	Denmark	71–89	Georgia	Farum, Denmark
18:30 (UTC+1)	Scoring by quarter: 12–12, 20–27, 15–38, 24–12
	Pts: Jensen 15; Rebs: Knudsen, Pedersen 8 Asts: Knudsen 4	Boxscore	Pts: Shengelia 24; Rebs: Shengelia 7 Asts: Reed, Shengelia 5	Arena: Farum Arena; Attendance: 1,908; Referees: Péter Praksch (HUN), Carsten Straube (GER), Valerio Grigioni (ITA)

2 March 2026 2027 FIBA World Cup qualifiers – 1st round	Georgia	89–60	Denmark	Tbilisi, Georgia
21:00 (UTC+4)	Scoring by quarter: 21–17, 22–14, 30–18, 16–11
	Pts: Reed 29; Rebs: Shengelia 11; Asts: Reed 8	Boxscore	Pts: Klussmann 17; Rebs: Heede-Andersen 9 Asts: Jensen 5	Arena: Tbilisi Arena; Attendance: 7,100; Referees: Georgios Poursanidis (GRE), Çisil Güngör (TUR), Elvis Binders-Čoders (LAT)

2 July 2026 2027 FIBA World Cup qualifiers – 1st round	Ukraine	95–76	Georgia	Riga, Latvia
18:30 (UTC+3)	Scoring by quarter: 30–27, 19–14, 26–19, 20–16
	Pts: Mykhailiuk 28; Rebs: Skapintsev 14; Asts: Kovliar 6	Boxscore	Pts: Reed 18; Rebs: Bitadze 8 Asts: Ochkhikidze 4	Arena: Xiaomi Arena; Attendance: 600; Referees: Martin Horozov (BUL), Valentin Oliot (FRA), Siniša Prpa (SRB)

5 July 2026 2027 FIBA World Cup qualifiers – 1st round	Georgia	91–89(OT)	Spain	Tbilisi, Georgia
19:30 (UTC+4)	Scoring by quarter: 14–32, 24–20, 19–19, 26–12, Overtime: 8–6
	Pts: Shengelia 37; Rebs: Shengelia 10; Asts: Reed 7	Boxscore	Pts: W. Hernangómez 19; Rebs: W. Hernangómez, Pradilla 8 Asts: Brizuela, Cárdenas 4	Arena: Tbilisi Arena; Attendance: 8,000; Referees: Mārtiņš Kozlovskis (LAT), Josip Jurčević (CRO), Andrea Bongiorni (ITA)

28 August 2026 2027 FIBA World Cup qualifiers – 2nd round	Georgia	101–74	Montenegro	Tbilisi, Georgia
19:30 (UTC+4)	Scoring by quarter: 27–17, 21–25, 29–25, 24–7
	Pts: Shengelia 24; Rebs: Bitadze 8 Asts: Reed 8	Boxscore	Pts: Ferrell 12; Rebs: Radović, Šuškavčević 6 Asts: Ferrell 4	Arena: Tbilisi Arena; Attendance: 8,222; Referees: Yohan Rosso (FRA), Gintaras Mačiulis (LTU), Elvis Binders-Čoders (LAT)

31 August 2026 2027 FIBA World Cup qualifiers – 2nd round	Portugal	90–98	Georgia	Matosinhos, Portugal
19:00 (UTC+1)	Scoring by quarter: 24–16, 18–25, 24–29, 24–28
	Pts: Queta 20; Rebs: Queta 11; Asts: Lisboa 5	Boxscore	Pts: Shengelia 26; Rebs: Mamukelashvili, Shengelia 6 Asts: Reed 6	Arena: Centro de Desportos e Congressos de Matosinhos; Attendance: 4,158; Referees: Gvidas Gedvilas (LTU), Valentin Oliot (FRA), Dariusz Zapolski (POL)

26 November 2026 2027 FIBA World Cup qualifiers – 2nd round	Greece	vs.	Georgia	Athens, Greece
20:00 (UTC+2)
		Boxscore		Arena: Telekom Center Athens

29 November 2026 2027 FIBA World Cup qualifiers – 2nd round	Georgia	vs.	Portugal	Tbilisi, Georgia
19:30 (UTC+4)
		Boxscore		Arena: Tbilisi Arena

=== 2027 ===
26 February 2027 2027 FIBA World Cup qualifiers – 2nd round	Montenegro	vs.	Georgia	Montenegro
--:-- (UTC+1)
		Boxscore

1 March 2027 2027 FIBA World Cup qualifiers – 2nd round	Georgia	vs.	Greece	Georgia
--:-- (UTC+4)
		Boxscore

== Team ==
=== Current roster ===
Roster for the 2027 FIBA World Cup Qualifiers matches on 28 and 31 August 2026 against Montenegro and Portugal.

Georgia men's national basketball team roster
Players
Coaches

Pos.	No.	Name	Age – Date of birth	Height	Club	Ctr.
F	0	Aleksandre Merkviladze	24 – 11 March 2002	2.04 m (6 ft 8 in)	Oostende	(Belgium)
PG	2	Marcquise Reed	31 – 21 April 1995	1.92 m (6 ft 4 in)	Bahçeşehir Koleji	(Turkey)
PG	4	Rati Andronikashvili	25 – 19 March 2001	1.95 m (6 ft 5 in)	Álftanes	(Iceland)
F	5	Sandro Mamukelashvili	27 – 23 May 1999	2.08 m (6 ft 10 in)	Los Angeles Lakers	(United States)
SF	6	Kakhaber Jintcharadze	33 – 16 July 1993	1.96 m (6 ft 5 in)	Kutaisi	(Georgia (country))
SG	10	Duda Sanadze	34 – 25 July 1992	1.96 m (6 ft 5 in)	Palma	(Spain)
C	11	Giorgi Turdziladze	28 – 21 October 1997	2.08 m (6 ft 10 in)	TSU	(Georgia (country))
PF	12	George Korsantia	28 – 11 January 1998	2.03 m (6 ft 8 in)	Fundación Lucentum	(Spain)
F	15	Aleksandre Phevadze	28 – 15 April 1998	2.07 m (6 ft 9 in)	Tizona	(Spain)
PF	23	Toko Shengelia (C)	34 – 5 October 1991	2.07 m (6 ft 9 in)	Dubai	(United Arab Emirates)
C	35	Goga Bitadze	27 – 20 June 1999	2.13 m (7 ft 0 in)	Orlando Magic	(United States)
PG	77	Giorgi Ochkhikidze	22 – 5 June 2004	1.92 m (6 ft 4 in)	Batumi	(Georgia (country))

Head coach

- (Serbia) Aleksandar Džikić

Assistant coach(es)

- (Georgia (country)) Anatoli Boisa
- (Italy) Marco Esposito

Legend

- (C) Team captain
- Club – describes last
  club before the competition
- Age – describes age
  on 28 August 2026

=== Depth chart ===
Pos.	Starting 5	Bench 1	Bench 2
C	Goga Bitadze	Giorgi Turdziladze
PF	Tornike Shengelia	Aleksandre Phevadze	George Korsantia
SF	Sandro Mamukelashvili	Kakhaber Jintcharadze	Aleksandre Merkviladze
SG	Duda Sanadze	Giorgi Ochkhikidze
PG	Marcquise Reed	Rati Andronikashvili

== Head coach history ==
- (Georgia (country)) Besik Liparteliani – (1994–1997)
- (Georgia (country)) Levan Moseshvili – (1997–1999)
- (Georgia (country)) Zurab Tomaradze – (1999–2001)
- (Croatia) Dražen Brajković – (2001–2005)
- (Canada) / (Finland) Gordon Herbert – (2005–2007)
- (Canada) Ken Shields – (2007–2008)
- (Serbia) Igor Kokoškov – (2008–2015)
- (Greece) Ilias Zouros – (2016–2023)
- (Serbia) Aleksandar Džikić – (2024–present)

== Past rosters ==
2011 EuroBasket: finished 11th among 24 teams

4 Giorgi Gamqrelidze, 5 Vladimir Boisa, 6 Anatoli Boisa, 7 Zaza Pachulia (C), 8 Giorgi Tsintsadze, 9 Giorgi Shermadini,
10 Lasha Parghalava, 11 Manuchar Markoishvili, 12 MarQuez Haynes, 13 Viktor Sanikidze, 14 Tornike Shengelia, 15 Nikoloz Tskitishvili
(Coach: (Serbia) Igor Kokoškov)

2013 EuroBasket: finished 17th among 24 teams

4 Nika Metreveli, 5 Otar Pkhakadze, 6 Duda Sanadze, 7 Beka Burjanadze, 8 Giorgi Tsintsadze, 9 Giorgi Shermadini, 10 Ricky Hickman,
11 Manuchar Markoishvili, 12 Levan Patsatsia, 13 Viktor Sanikidze, 14 Besik Lezhava, 15 Nikoloz Tskitishvili (Coach: (Serbia) Igor Kokoškov)

2015 EuroBasket: finished 15th among 24 teams

0 Jacob Pullen, 4 Nika Metreveli, 7 Zaza Pachulia (C), 8 Giorgi Tsintsadze, 9 Giorgi Shermadini, 10 Duda Sanadze,
11 Manuchar Markoishvili, 12 Levan Patsatsia, 13 Viktor Sanikidze, 15 Beka Burjanadze, 23 Tornike Shengelia, 25 Besik Lezhava
(Coach: (Serbia) Igor Kokoškov)

2017 EuroBasket: finished 17th among 24 teams

3 Michael Dixon, 4 Giorgi Gamqrelidze, 6 Anatoli Boisa, 7 Zaza Pachulia (C), 8 Giorgi Tsintsadze, 9 Giorgi Shermadini,
10 Duda Sanadze, 11 Manuchar Markoishvili, 17 Mikheil Berishvili, 23 Tornike Shengelia, 35 Goga Bitadze, 99 Ilia Londaridze
(Coach: (Greece) Ilias Zouros)

2022 EuroBasket: finished 21st among 24 teams

4 Rati Andronikashvili, 5 Sandro Mamukelashvili, 6 Kakhaber Jintcharadze, 7 Beka Burjanadze, 8 Giorgi Tsintsadze,
9 Giorgi Shermadini (C), 10 Duda Sanadze, 17 Mikheil Berishvili, 18 Merab Bokolishvili, 25 Thad McFadden, 33 Beka Bekauri,
35 Goga Bitadze (Coach: (Greece) Ilias Zouros)

2023 FIBA World Cup: finished 16th among 32 teams

4 Rati Andronikashvili, 5 Sandro Mamukelashvili, 6 Kakhaber Jintcharadze, 7 Luka Liklikadze, 8 Giorgi Tsintsadze, 9 Giorgi Shermadini,
10 Duda Sanadze, 11 Giorgi Turdziladze, 17 Mikheil Berishvili, 23 Tornike Shengelia (C), 25 Thad McFadden, 35 Goga Bitadze
(Coach: (Greece) Ilias Zouros)

2025 EuroBasket: finished 8th among 24 teams

4 Rati Andronikashvili, 5 Sandro Mamukelashvili, 6 Kakhaber Jintcharadze, 7 Beka Burjanadze, 9 Giorgi Shermadini, 10 Duda Sanadze, 12 George Korsantia, 15 Aleksandre Phevadze, 23 Tornike Shengelia (C), 35 Goga Bitadze, 44 Kamar Baldwin, 77 Giorgi Ochkhikidze (Coach: (Serbia) Aleksandar Džikić)

== Head-to-head record ==
Does not include unofficial closed door friendly matches

As of 01 September 2026

Opponent	Played	Wins	Losses
Albania	2	2	0
Australia	2	0	2
Austria	13	8	5
Azerbaijan	2	2	0
Belgium	6	2	4
Bosnia and Herzegovina	8	3	5
Belarus	11	8	3
Bulgaria	8	3	5
Canada	1	0	1
Cape Verde	1	1	0
Central African Republic	1	1	0
Croatia	2	1	1
Cyprus	3	2	1
Czech Republic	12	4	8
Denmark	8	6	2
England	3	1	2
Estonia	7	4	3
Finland	10	5	5
France	4	1	3
Germany	6	0	6
Great Britain	1	1	0
Greece	10	1	9
Hungary	5	1	4
Iceland	4	2	2
Ireland	4	4	0
Israel	12	7	5
Italy	14	0	14
Jordan	1	1	0
Latvia	12	7	5
Lithuania	9	2	7
Luxembourg	8	7	1
North Macedonia	9	6	3
Moldova	1	1	0
Montenegro	5	3	2
Netherlands	9	5	4
Philippines	1	1	0
Poland	8	2	6
Portugal	7	6	1
Romania	8	7	1
Russia	5	1	4
Serbia	8	3	5
Slovakia	7	5	2
Slovenia	5	0	5
Spain	7	3	4
Sweden	7	3	4
Switzerland	3	2	1
Tunisia	1	0	1
Turkey	5	1	4
Ukraine	12	7	5
Venezuela	1	1	0
Wales	1	1	0
Total: 51 countries	300	145	155

=== Record against teams at the EuroBasket ===
Team	W	L
Belgium	1	1
Bosnia and Herzegovina	0	1
Bulgaria	0	2
Croatia	1	1
Cyprus	1	0
Czech Republic	0	1
Finland	0	2
France	1	0
Germany	0	1
Greece	0	3
Israel	1	0
Italy	0	2
Lithuania	1	1
North Macedonia	1	1
Montenegro	0	1
Netherlands	0	1
Poland	1	0
Russia	0	1
Slovenia	0	3
Spain	1	2
Turkey	1	0
Ukraine	1	1
Total: 22 countries	11	25

=== Notable results ===
Date	Status	Team	Result	Team
22 July 2004	Friendly	Russia	71–87	Georgia
16 August 2013	Friendly	Serbia	71–75	Georgia
10 September 2015	EuroBasket 2015	Croatia	58–71	Georgia
5 August 2017	Friendly	Lithuania	70–81	Georgia
23 August 2017	Friendly	Greece	71–72	Georgia
24 August 2017	Friendly	Serbia	66–68	Georgia
31 August 2017	EuroBasket 2017	Lithuania	77–79	Georgia
23 February 2020	EuroBasket 2022 Qualification	Serbia	90–94	Georgia
4 July 2022	2023 FIBA World Cup Qualifiers	Georgia	82–76 (OT)	Spain
4 September 2022	EuroBasket 2022	Georgia	88–83 (2OT)	Turkey
28 August 2025	EuroBasket 2025	Spain	69–83	Georgia
7 September 2025	EuroBasket 2025	France	70–80	Georgia
5 July 2026	2027 FIBA World Cup Qualifiers	Georgia	91-89 OT	Spain

== Kit ==
=== Manufacturer ===
- 2015–present: Spalding

=== Sponsor ===
- 2015: Natakhtari
- 2019: Georgian Railway

== See also ==
- Sport in Georgia
- Georgia women's national basketball team
- Georgia men's national under-20 basketball team
- Georgia men's national under-18 basketball team
- Georgia men's national under-16 basketball team
