= Ilia Londaridze =

Ilia Londaridze ილია ლონდარიძე
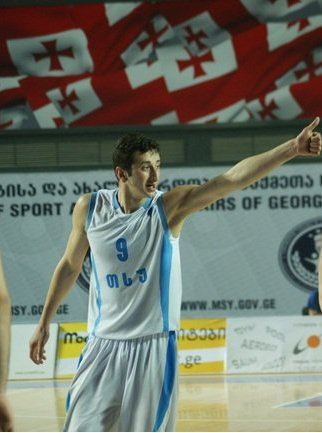
- Ilia Londaridze in BC TSU (2011)

No. 9 – BC Kavkasia Tbilisi
- Position: Center
- League: Georgian Superliga

Personal information
- Born: September 15, 1989 (age 37) Tbilisi, Georgian SSR, Soviet Union
- Listed height: 6 ft 9 in (2.06 m)
- Listed weight: 192 lb (87 kg)

Career information
- NBA draft: 2011: undrafted
- Playing career: 2008–present

Career history
- 2008–2009: Maccabi Tbilisi
- 2009–2010: Dinamo Tbilisi
- 2010–2011: TSU Tbilisi
- 2011–2014: MIA Academy
- 2014–2018: Dinamo Tbilisi
- 2018–2019: Titebi
- 2019–2020: Rustavi
- 2020–2021: Kutaisi
- 2021-2022: Olimpi Tbilisi
- 2022-2023: BC Kavkasia Tbilisi

Career highlights
- 3x Georgian Super Liga champion (2013, 2015, 2017)

Ilia londaridze (Georgian: ილია ლონდარიძე; born September 15, 1989), is a Georgian professional basketball player who plays for BC Kavkasia Tbilisi in Georgian Super Liga

== Early career ==
Ilia Londaridze started his youth career in BC Imedi, where his first coach was Levan Intskirveli. The next club Ilia played for was BC Nike, where his head coach was Guram Megreladze. Ilia played successfully in the Georgian U-20 League, before making it as a professional.

== Pro career ==
=== Maccabi Tbilisi ===
Ilia Started his Pro career with Georgian basketball club Maccabi Tbilisi in 2008, where he played in Georgian Super League and during the time there the young basketball player made a great progress.

=== Dinamo Tbilisi ===
Next season Londaridze transferred to the most famous Georgian club, Dinamo Tbilisi

=== TSU Tbilisi ===
After playing for Dinamo Ilia was invited to play for a Georgian basketball club, TSU Tbilisi, where he quickly became a team leader and showed his talent. Londaridze played many games for TSU and became a prominent figure in Georgian Super League.

=== SHSS Tbilisi ===
In 2011 Ilia Londaridze signed a contract with one of the best Georgian clubs SHSS Tbilisi and he still plays there.

== Super League career statistics ==
Legend
GP	Games played	GS	Games started	MPG	Minutes per game
FG%	Field goal percentage	3P%	3-point field goal percentage	FT%	Free throw percentage
RPG	Rebounds per game	APG	Assists per game	SPG	Steals per game
BPG	Blocks per game	PPG	Points per game	**Bold**	Career high

=== Regular season ===
Year	Team	GP	GS	MPG	FG%	3P%	FT%	RPG	APG	SPG	BPG	PPG
2008–09	Maccabi Tbilisi	16	16	26.9	42.3	12.5	76.7	**9.9**	1	**1.6**	.5	11.9
2009–10	Dinamo Tbilisi	18	15	24.6	49.1	**100**	59.7	9.7	1.2	1.1	**.8**	**15.2**
2010–11	TSU Tbilisi	30	25	24.1	52.7	10	60.1	8.8	1.1	1.1	**.8**	**13.4**
2011–12	SHSS Tbilisi	5	1	15	48.6	0	**100**	6.4	1.1	.8	.4	8.2
Career		69	57	24.2	48.9	20	63.6	9.1	1.1	1.2	.7	**13.1**

== Awards and accomplishments ==
- **Georgian Super League**
  - Runners-up (1): (2011)
- **Dudu Dadiani Memorial**
  - Winners (1): (2011)
- **Dudu Dadiani Memorial**
  - Best Player (1): (2011)
- **Dudu Dadiani Memorial**
  - Best Center (1): (2011)
- **Georgian All-Star Game**
  - Winner (1): (2011)
