= Levan Patsatsia =

Georgian basketball player

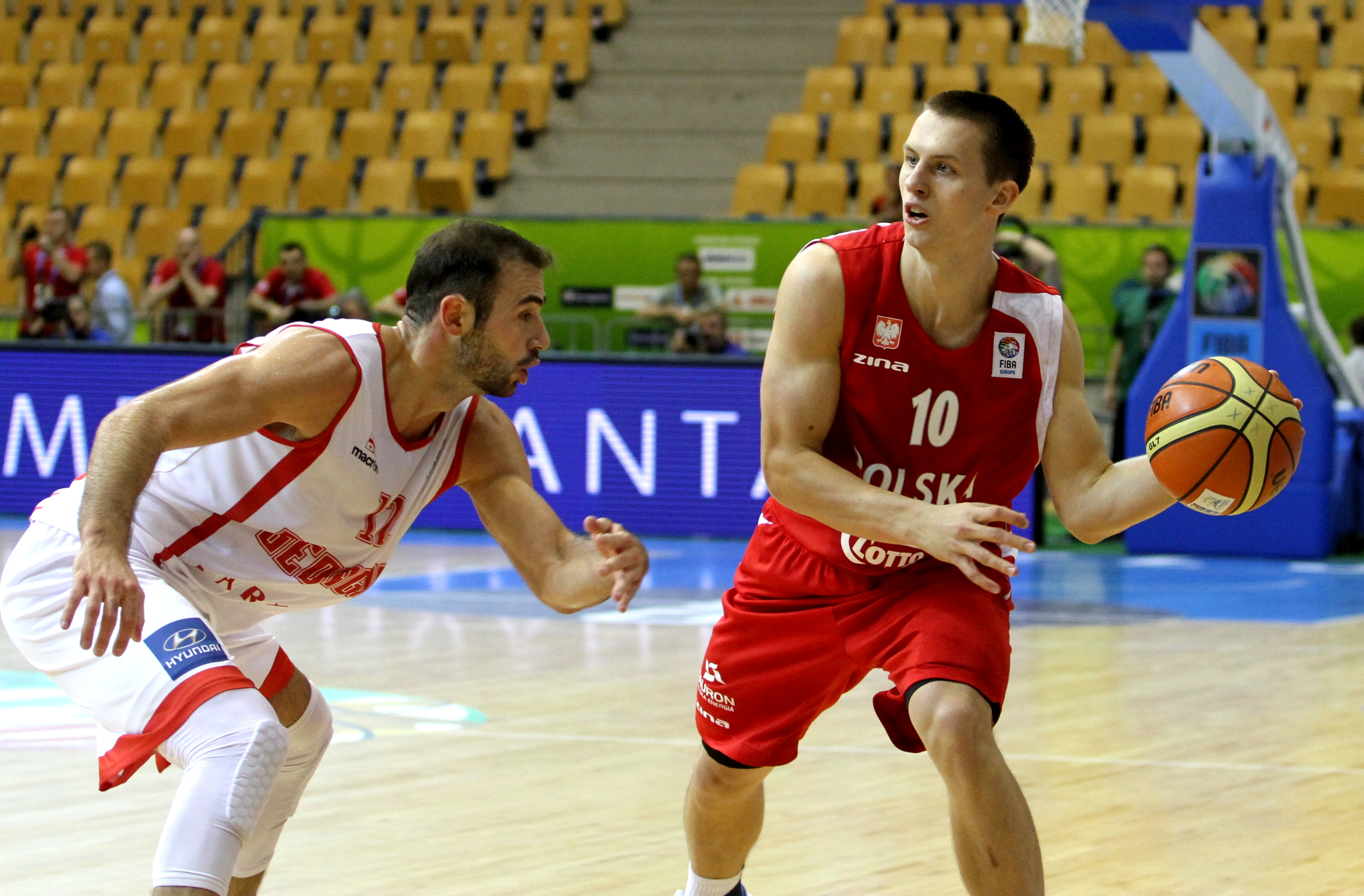
- Patsatsia (left) in 2013

Personal information
- Born: September 24, 1988 (age 38) Tbilisi, Georgian SSR, Soviet Union
- Listed height: 1.98 m (6 ft 6 in)

Career information
- College: Troy University (2009–2011)
- Position: Head coach

Career history

Playing
- 2011–2012: BC Sokhumi
- 2012–2013: Olimpi Tbilisi
- 2013–2014: BC Dnipro-Azot
- 2014–2015: BC Nizhny Novgorod
- 2015: MIA Academy
- 2015–2016: BC Sokhumi
- 2016–2018: Dinamo Tbilisi
- 2018: BC Delta
- 2018-2019: Kutaisi

Coaching
- 2020: Arena-Orbi
- 2021: BC Vera

Levan Patsatsia (Georgian: ლევან ფაცაცია) (born September 24, 1988) is a former Georgian basketball player for the Georgian national team, where he participated at the EuroBasket 2015. He retired as a player in 2019 due to injuries, and was appointed as the head coach of Arena-Orbi in Georgian A-Liga for the 2020 season.

== Family ==
His sister, Tika is a model, singer and TV host.
