= 2017–18 Georgian Superliga =

18th season of the Georgian Superliga

Superliga
- Teams: 9

Regular season
- Relegated: Sokhumi

Finals
- Champions: Dinamo (6th title)
- Runners-up: Kutaisi

The 2017–18 Georgian Superliga is the 18th season of the Georgian Superliga since its establishment.

Dinamo Tbilisi retained the title.

== Teams ==
Delta joined the competition, expanding it to nine teams as no team was relegated from the previous season.

== Regular season ==
Pos	Team	Pld	W	L	PF	PA	PD	Pts	Qualification
1	Kutaisi	32	23	9	2745	2444	+301	55	Qualification to playoffs
2	Cactus	32	22	10	2708	2597	+111	54	Qualification to playoffs
3	Dinamo	32	21	11	2667	2411	+256	53	Qualification to playoffs
4	Rustavi	32	21	11	2671	2498	+173	53	Qualification to playoffs
5	Batumi	32	17	15	2443	2349	+94	49	Qualification to playoffs
6	Olimpi	32	16	16	2471	2420	+51	48	Qualification to playoffs
7	Mgzavrebi	32	13	19	2546	2730	−184	45	Qualification to playoffs
8	Delta	32	10	22	2601	2738	−137	42	Qualification to playoffs
9	Sokhumi (R)	32	1	31	2357	3022	−665	33	Qualification to relegation playoffs

Source: Superleague.ge
(R) Relegated

== Playoffs ==
Quarterfinals were played in a best-of-three games format, while semifinals and final in a best-of-five (2-2-1) format.

Quarter-finals
Kutaisi	85	83
Delta	70	70
Rustavi	82	66	78
Batumi	62	84	69
Cactus	69	75
Mgzavrebi	85	87
Dinamo	70	70
Olimpi	43	60

Semi-finals
Kutaisi	75	90	64	74	85
Rustavi	81	70	76	63	79
Mgzavrebi	74	75	71	61
Dinamo	85	84	60	72

Final
Kutaisi	77	73	71	63	69
Dinamo	71	81	80	55	77

Third place
Rustavi	76
Mgzavrebi	79

== Relegation playoffs ==
Titebi played legs 2 and 3 at home and promoted to Superliga.

Team 1	Series	Team 2	Game 1	Game 2	Game 3
Sokhumi	1–2	Titebi	82–53	83–90	78–83
