= Vladimir Boisa =

Georgian basketball player (born 1981)

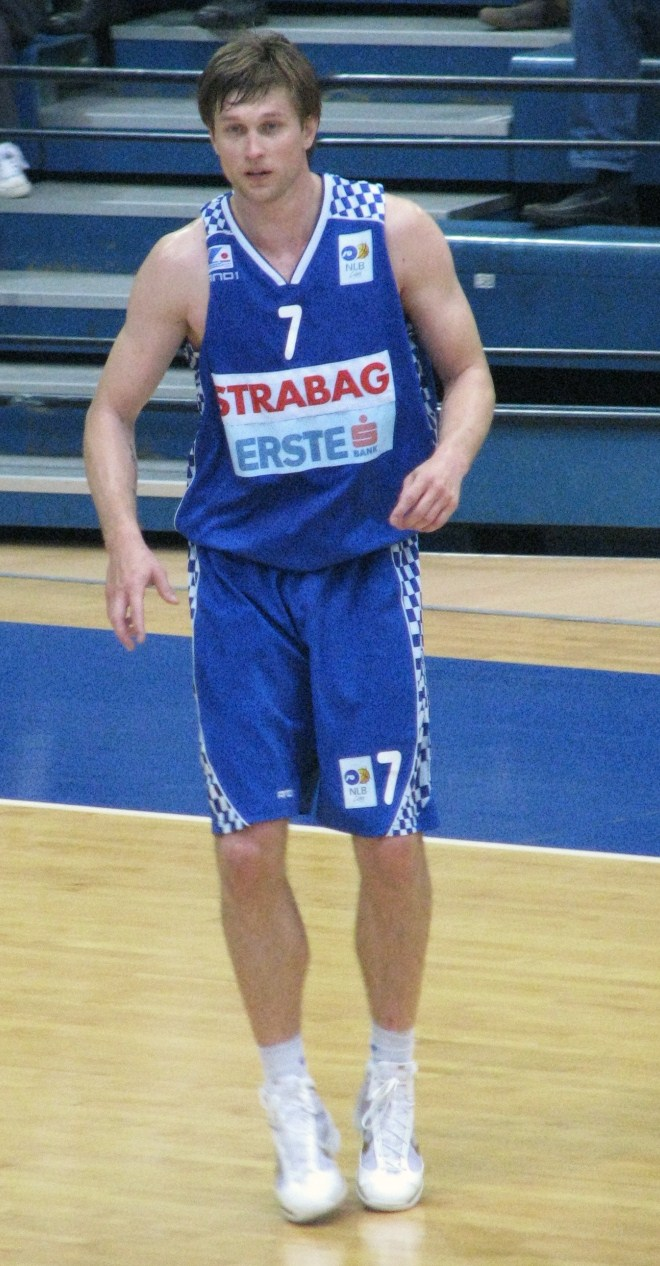
- Boisa playing for Zadar

Personal information
- Born: July 4, 1981 (age 45) Rustavi, Georgian SSR, Soviet Union
- Listed height: 6 ft 10 in (2.08 m)
- Listed weight: 225 lb (102 kg)

Career information
- NBA draft: 2003: undrafted
- Playing career: 1996–2012
- Position: Power forward

Career history
- 1996–1998: Azoti Rustavi
- 1998–1999: Postojna
- 1999–2001: Slovan
- 2001–2005: Olimpija
- 2005–2007: Montepaschi Siena
- 2007–2008: Spartak Primorje
- 2008: Aris Thessaloniki
- 2008–2009: Menorca Bàsquet
- 2009–2010: Zadar
- 2010–2011: Olimpija
- 2012: Panionios
- 2012: Armia

Career highlights
- FIBA EuroStar (2007); Italian League champion (2007); Adriatic League champion (2002); 3× Slovenian League champion (2002, 2004, 2005); 4× Slovenian Cup winner (2002, 2003, 2005, 2011); 3× Slovenian Supercup winner (2003, 2004, 2005)

Vladimir Boisa or Vladimer Boisa (born July 4, 1981) is a Georgian former professional basketball player. Since 2013 he is the vice-president of Georgian Basketball Federation.

== Professional career ==
Boisa has spent the most successful years of his career in Slovenia, where he played for Olimpija for the four seasons. During the last season with the club, Boisa participated in EuroLeague, where his average stats were 15.8 points and 6.3 rebounds. He managed to score 28 points against Maccabi Tel Aviv during the season, which is the highest points he has ever scored in the competition.

Later he moved to Italy and joined Montepaschi Siena in 2005.

During his season-long spell in Greece with Aris Thessaloniki, Boisa averaged 4.1 points and 2.5 rebounds in the Greek Basket League.

The Georgian player has Liga ACB experience as well, as he played for Menorca Bàsquet during 2008-09 season, averaging 4 points and 2 rebound in 18 minutes of playing time. He was released by the club in February, 2009.

Boisa returned to Olimpija in 2010, having spent the only season for the club.

In 2012, during his final year of career Boisa moved again to Greece and joined Panionios. His last club was BC Armia in Georgian Superliga. He left the club at the start of year 2013 and decided to retire.

== National team career ==
Vladimir Boisa played for the Georgia national team. He was one of the members of the team, which won FIBA EuroBasket 2009 Division B.

Boisa participated with his national team at the 2011 Eurobasket as well, averaging 2.6 points per game.

== Personal life ==
Boisa is married to a Slovenian woman and has two children: a boy named Lian and a daughter named Naia.

Vladimer's brother Anatoli is also a basketball player. The brothers participated together for Georgia in EuroBasket in 2011.

== Career statistics ==
Legend
GP	Games played	GS	Games started	MPG	Minutes per game
FG%	Field-goal percentage	3P%	3-point field-goal percentage	FT%	Free-throw percentage
RPG	Rebounds per game	APG	Assists per game	SPG	Steals per game
BPG	Blocks per game	PPG	Points per game	PIR	Performance index rating
**Bold**	Career high

=== EuroLeague ===
Year	Team	GP	GS	MPG	FG%	3P%	FT%	RPG	APG	SPG	BPG	PPG	PIR
2001–02	KK Olimpija	8	3	8.1	.357	.143	**.900**	1.1	.0	.4	.1	2.8	0.8
2002–03	KK Olimpija	**20**	**20**	21.2	.465	.319	.726	3.7	**.9**	**.8**	.3	8.5	7.0
2003–04	KK Olimpija	19	18	27.5	.453	.349	.623	3.0	**.9**	.6	.3	9.3	5.7
2004–05	KK Olimpija	14	14	**33.2**	**.532**	.286	.603	**6.3**	.4	**.8**	**.5**	**15.8**	**14.5**
2005–06	Montepaschi Siena	14	9	20.3	.500	.229	.500	3.2	.8	**.8**	.3	5.6	4.1
2007–08	Aris Thessaloniki	10	3	16.0	.278	**.500**	.429	2.2	.7	.1	.2	3.4	2.7
2010–11	KK Olimpija	4	0	6.5	.000	.000	.000	.5	.5	.0	.0	.0	.0
Career		89	67	20.9	.476	.312	.636	3.3	.7	.6	.1	7.9	6.1
