= Giorgi Tsintsadze =

Georgian professional basketball player

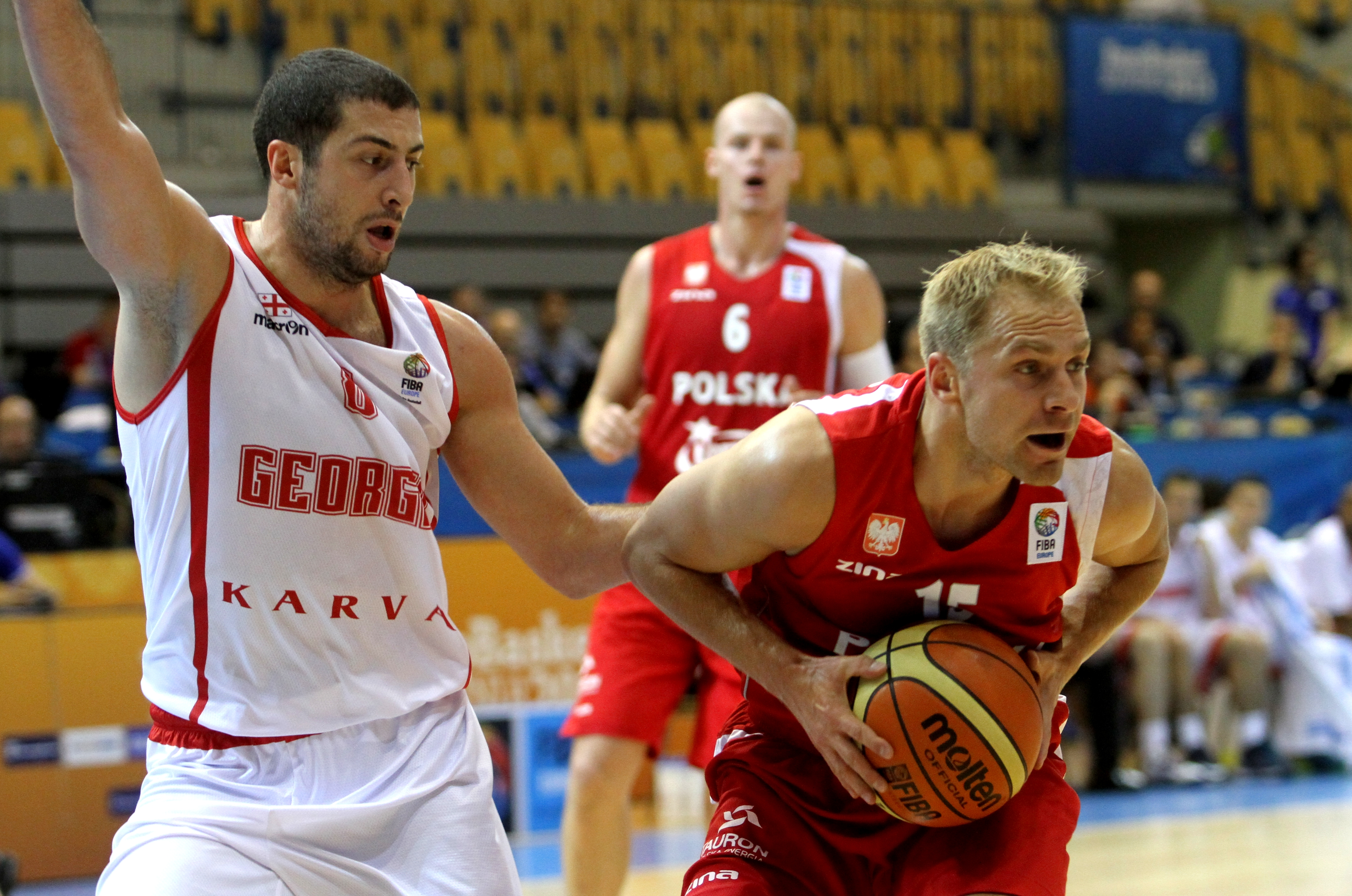
- Tsintsadze (left) against Poland in 2013

No. 8 – BC TSU Tbilisi
- Position: Point guard
- League: Georgian Superliga

Personal information
- Born: 7 February 1986 (age 40) Tbilisi, Georgian SSR, USSR
- Listed height: 6 ft 3.5 in (1.92 m)
- Listed weight: 198 lb (90 kg)

Career information
- NBA draft: 2008: undrafted
- Playing career: 2001–present

Career history
- 2001–2002: Academy Tbilisi
- 2002–2003: Basco Batumi
- 2003–2004: CSKA Moscow
- 2004–2005: BC Samara
- 2005: Ural Great Perm
- 2005–2006: Dynamo Moscow
- 2006–2009: Tartu Ülikool/Rock
- 2009: Trikala 2000
- 2009–2010: BC Donetsk
- 2010: Trefl Sopot
- 2010–2011: Tartu Ülikool/Rock
- 2011–2012: Olimpi Tbilisi
- 2012–2013: Budivelnyk Kyiv
- 2013–2014: BC Donetsk
- 2014: Champville
- 2014: MZT Skopje
- 2014–2015: MIA Academy
- 2015: BCM Gravelines
- 2016: Rouen Métropole Basket
- 2016–2017: Kutaisi 2010
- 2017–2018: Politehnica Iași
- 2018-2020: Al-Shamal Doha
- 2020: Dinamo Tbilisi
- 2020-2021: Baniyas Abu Dhabi
- 2021-2022: BC TSU Tbilisi
- 2022: US Monastir
- 2022-present: BC TSU Tbilisi

Career highlights
- ANGT Champion (2004); Russian League Champion (2004); EuroCup Champion (2006); 2× Estonian League Champion (2007–2008); Estonian Cup Champion (2011); Baltic League All-Star (2008); FIBA Eurocup All-Star (2008); 3x All-Estonian League Team (2007-2009); Estonian League Best European player (2007); 2x Estonian League Guard of the year (2007-2008); Estonian League MVP of the year (2009); FIBA Europe Cup Guard of the year (2008); FIBA Europe Cup Best European player (2008); All-FIBA Europe Cup Team (2008); All-Georgian Superliga Team (2012,2015,2017,2023); Georgian Superliga All-Star Game (2012,2015,2017,2023); Georgian Superliga Best Georgian player (2012); Ukrainian League Champion (2013); Georgian Superliga Guard of the year (2015,2017); Georgian League MVP of the year (2017,2023); Georgian Superliga Assists Leader (2023); 2x Qatari Basketball League Champion (2019-2020); 2x Georgian Cup Champion (2023,2024); 2x Georgian Superliga Champion (2015,2023)

Giorgi Tsintsadze (Georgian: გიორგი ცინცაძე; born 7 Feb 1986) is a Georgian professional basketball player for BC TSU Tbilisi of the Georgian Superliga. Giorgi is native of Tbilisi, the capital of Georgia. He is also a member of the Georgian national basketball team since 2004.

== Professional career ==
He has played for CSKA Moscow and Dynamo Moscow prior to transferring to Rock Tartu in Estonia. In 2009, after three successful seasons in Tartu, he signed with the Greek League team AS Trikala 2000. Trikala released him on 11 December 2009 upon his own request. He then moved to Ukrainian SuperLeague team BC Donetsk. After the team bankrupted Tsindsadze went to Poland in March 2010 and signed for Trefl Sopot until the end of the season. For the 2010–11 season he returned to Estonia to play for Tartu Ülikool/Rock. Tsintsadze then went to his native Georgia for one season. In 2012 he signed with Budivelnyk Kyiv of the Ukrainian SuperLeague. In September 2013, he returned to his former team BC Donetsk. In the summer 2014, Tsintsadze signed with Macedonian basketball team MZT Skopje. On 31 October 2014 he parted ways with MZT. In November 2014, he returned to Georgia and signed with MIA Academy for the rest of the season. On 15 September 2015 he signed with French club BCM Gravelines. In December 2015, he left Gravelines. On 4 January 2016 he signed with Rouen Métropole Basket for the rest of the 2015–16 LNB Pro A season.

== Honours and titles ==
- 2003–04 Russian Basketball Super League (CSKA Moscow)
- 2005–06 ULEB Cup (Dynamo Moscow)
- 2006–07 Estonian League (Tartu Ülikool/Rock)
- 2007–08 Estonian League (Tartu Ülikool/Rock)
- 2010–11 BBL Cup (Tartu Ülikool/Rock)
- 2010–11 Estonian Cup (Tartu Ülikool/Rock)
- 2012–13 Ukrainian Basketball SuperLeague (BC Budivelnyk)
