= BC Titebi =

Tibeti
- Leagues: Georgian Superliga
- Founded: 2016; 9 years ago
- Arena: Olympic Palace
- Capacity: 4,000
- Location: Tbilisi, Georgia
- Team colors: Darkblue and White
- Main sponsor: Crocobet
- President: Giorgi Gamqrelidze
- Vice-president(s): Giorgi Jafaridze
- Head coach: Manuchar Markoishvili
- Championships: 1 Georgian Cup
- Website: Presentation at league website
Home	Away

BC Titebi Tbilisi (Georgian: საკალათბურთო კლუბი ტიტები) is the Georgian professional basketball club, that is based in Tbilisi, Georgia. The club competes in the Georgian basketball Super Liga.

== History ==
The club was established by the Georgian basketball players and Georgia national basketball team members Giorgi Gamqrelidze and Besik Lezhava in 2016.

In 2018, the club was promoted to the Superliga after beating Sokhumi in the promotion/relegation playoffs.

In 2019, Titebi won the Georgian Cup after beating Mgzavrebi in the Finals 95–85, becoming the first team in Georgian basketball history to achieve this feat in their first season in the top flight of Georgian Basketball.

== Honours ==
Georgian Cup

- Winners (1): 2019

== Team ==
=== Current roster ===
BC Titebi roster
Players
Coaches

Pos.	No.	Nat.	Name	Ht.	Wt.	Age
CG	0	(Georgia (country))	Dixon, Michael	1.86 m (6 ft 1 in)		34 – 1 December 1990
PG	4	(United States)	Talley, Jordon	1.85 m (6 ft 1 in)		29 – 16 July 1995
F	5	(United States)	Birts, Tylan	1.98 m (6 ft 6 in)		28 – 8 November 1996
PG	33	(Georgia (country))	Kakuberi, Aleksandre	1.81 m (5 ft 11 in)		25 – 27 October 1999
G/F	13	(Georgia (country))	Lomidze, Davit	1.96 m (6 ft 5 in)		28 – 13 January 1997
F	15	(Georgia (country))	Janelidze, Zaur	1.95 m (6 ft 5 in)		25 – 20 September 1999
PF/C	23	(Georgia (country))	Birkaia, Guja	2.03 m (6 ft 8 in)	90 kg (198 lb)	30 – 23 January 1995
F	20	(Georgia (country))	Lomouri, Akaki (C)	1.98 m (6 ft 6 in)		34 – 17 January 1991
CG	6	(Georgia (country))	Babunashvili, Teimuraz (VC)	1.84 m (6 ft 0 in)		35 – 7 February 1990
G/F	8	(Georgia (country))	Daghelishvili, Lasha	1.96 m (6 ft 5 in)		24 – 8 January 2001
C	24	(Georgia (country))	Buchukuri, Ramaz	2.12 m (6 ft 11 in)		26 – 24 February 1999
C	30	(United States)	Aughburns, Branden	2.08 m (6 ft 10 in)		28 – 1 October 1996
SG	7	(Georgia (country))	Jafaridze, Giorgi	1.88 m (6 ft 2 in)		25 – 23 June 1999

Head coach

- (Georgia (country)) Manuchar Markoishvili

Assistant coach(es)

- (Georgia (country)) Davit Nozadze
- (Georgia (country)) Besik Lezhava
- (Georgia (country)) Aleksandre Nozadze

Athletic trainer(s)

- (Georgia (country)) Archil Bezhiashvili

Doctor

- (Georgia (country)) Giorgi Tsintsadze

Legend

- (C) Team captain
- Injured

=== Notable players ===
- (Georgia (country)) Ilia Londaridze
- (Georgia (country)) Giorgi Sharabidze
- (Georgia (country)) (Italy) Nika Metreveli
- (Georgia (country)) Richard Matiashvili
- (Georgia (country)) Besik Lezhava
- (Georgia (country)) Giorgi Gamqrelidze
- (Cape Verde) (Portugal) Joel Almeida

=== Coaches ===
- (Georgia (country)) Ambrosi Ormotsadze — 2016–2017
- (Georgia (country)) Davit Ustiashvili — 2017–2018
- (Georgia (country)) Giorgi Gamqrelidze — 2018-2019
