= Nika Metreveli =

Georgian-Italian basketball player

BC Titebi
- Position: Center
- League: Georgian Superliga

Personal information
- Born: 14 January 1991 (age 35) Tbilisi, Georgian SSR, Soviet Union
- Listed height: 6 ft 11 in (2.11 m)
- Listed weight: 223 lb (101 kg)

Career information
- NBA draft: 2012: undrafted
- Playing career: 2007–present

Career history
- 2006–2007: Basket Rimini Crabs
- 2008–2012: Mens Sana Basket
- 2009–2010: → Basket Ferentino
- 2010–2011: → Basket Rimini Crabs
- 2011–2012: → Dinamo Basket Sassari
- 2012: → Basket Napoli
- 2012–2013: Fulgor Omegna
- 2013: Sokhumi
- 2013–2014: Roseto Sharks
- 2014–2015: Azzurro Napoli Basket 2013
- 2015: MIA Academy
- 2015–2016: Betaland Capo d'Orlando
- 2016–2017: Juvecaserta Basket
- 2017–2019: Scafati Basket
- 2019: Mantova
- 2019–present: BC Titebi

Career highlights
- Italian Serie A champion (2009); Italian Cup winner (2009); Georgian Superliga champion (2015)

Nika Metreveli (Georgian: ნიკა მეტრეველი; born 14 January 1991) is a Georgian-Italian professional basketball player for BC Titebi of the Georgian Superliga.

== Professional career ==
The 2013–14 season, Metreveli started with Sokhumi but on 3 December 2013 he left the club and signed with Italian second division club Roseto Sharks for the rest of the season.

On 25 June 2014 he signed with Azzurro Napoli Basket 2013 of the Serie A2 Basket, second level of Italian basketball. On 9 January 2015 he left the club. In February 2015, he signed with MIA Academy for the rest of the season.

On 18 September 2015 Metreveli signed with Italian club Betaland Capo d'Orlando. On 5 January 2016 he left Capo d'Orlando and signed with Juvecaserta Basket. On 20 January 2017 he parted ways with Juvecaserta. Four days later he signed with Scafati Basket for the rest of the season.

On 24 August 2019 he signed with BC Titebi of the Georgian Superliga.

== National team ==
Nika Metreveli is a member of Georgia national basketball team.
