= Deonta Vaughn =

American basketball player (born 1986)

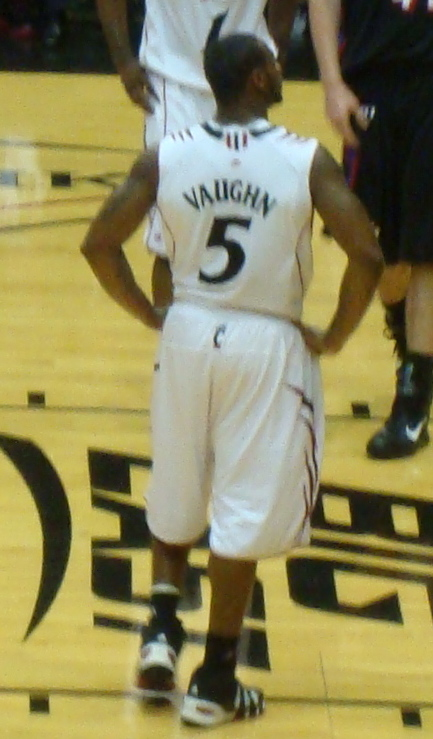

Free Agent
- Position: Point guard

Personal information
- Born: August 6, 1986 (age 40) Indianapolis, Indiana
- Listed height: 6 ft 1 in (1.85 m)
- Listed weight: 190 lb (86 kg)

Career information
- High school: Arlington (Indianapolis, Indiana); Harmony Community School (Cincinnati, Ohio)
- College: Cincinnati (2006–2010)
- NBA draft: 2010: undrafted
- Playing career: 2010–present

Career history
- 2010–2011: Polpharma Starogard Gdański
- 2011–2012: MBC Mykolaiv
- 2012–2013: MIA Academy
- 2013–2014: Atomerőmű SE
- 2014–2015: Anwil Włocławek
- 2015: Paris-Levallois
- 2015: AEK Larnaca
- 2015–2016: Boulazac Basket Dordogne
- 2016–2017: Dinamo Tbilisi
- 2017–2018: Zalakerámia ZTE
- 2018–2019: APOEL
- 2020: Polpharma Starogard Gdański

Career highlights
- Georgian Superliga MVP (2013); 2× Georgian Superliga champion (2013, 2017); 2× Georgian Superliga All-Star (2013, 2017); Georgian Cup winner (2013); Polish Basketball Cup winner (2011); Third-team All-Big East (2009); First-team All-Big East (2008); Big East All-Rookie Team (2007)

Deonta Thomas Vaughn (born August 6, 1986) is an American professional basketball player, who lastly played for Polpharma Starogard Gdański of the Polish Basketball League (PLK). He played high school basketball in his native Indianapolis and in Cincinnati, Ohio, and signed to play for the Cincinnati Bearcats in the NCAA Division I. He stayed 4 years with the Bearcats, earning two all-conference selections in his sophomore and junior year, and he retired as the third best scorer in program history. After going undrafted in the 2010 NBA draft, Vaughn started his professional career in Poland. Throughout his career he has played in Poland, Ukraine, Georgia, Hungary, France and Cyprus.

== High school career ==
Vaughn was born in Indianapolis to father Derek and mother Veronica Taylor, and attended Arlington High School there. In high school Vaughn played both as a point guard and as a shooting guard; as a sophomore he averaged 12 points, 3.5 rebounds, 3.3 assists and 2.8 steals per game and was a regular member of Arlington's starting lineup under coach Larry Nicks. In the summer of 2004, before the start of his junior year, Vaughn attended the Nike All-American Camp, a camp for the best recruits of the United States. As a junior at Arlington, Vaughn averaged 18 points, 4.5 assists and 4 steals per game, was selected to participate in the Indiana-Kentucky High School All-Star Game, and he was an all-state selection.

In July 2005, the summer that preceded his senior year, Vaughn attended the ABCD Camp, another camp for highly ranked high school players. In his senior year at Arlington Vaughn averaged 22.3 points, 4 rebounds, 5.5 assists and 3.5 steals per game, being selected in the All-State First Team. He won the conference championship with the team, which had a 23–1 record, and was named the team MVP. He was named as one of the top 100 seniors by the McDonald's All-American Game selection committee, and started all four years at Arlington. Instead of heading to college, Vaughn decided to attend a prep school, and he enrolled at Harmony Community School in Cincinnati, Ohio for his fifth year of high school. At Harmony, Vaughn averaged 17 points, 4.3 rebounds and 6.6 assists per game, and was coached by Rodney Crawford, a former player of the Cincinnati Bearcats.

== College career ==
=== Freshman season ===
As a member of the 2005 high school class, Vaughn was recruited by Indiana, Illinois, Ohio State and Purdue. He made a verbal commitment to Indiana in October 2004; however, when he made the decision to attend prep school, Vaughn became part of the 2006 class. He moved to Cincinnati, Ohio and in April 2006 he signed a National Letter of Intent to play for the Cincinnati Bearcats.

At Cincinnati, Vaughn chose jersey number 5 and made his debut on November 10, 2006, against Howard, playing 22 minutes and scoring 7 points. He made his first start on November 21 against Wofford, and he scored a career-high 33 points in 38 minutes of play, shooting 12/24 from the field (9/17 on three-pointers). That week, Vaughn was named Big East Rookie of the Week after the 33-point performance against Wofford and 19 points against Central Michigan. On December 13, 2006, Vaughn scored 24 points against Xavier. He then scored 25 points together with 9 assists (a career high) and 6 steals against NC State on December 23, and was named Rookie of the Week for the second time in the season. He then scored 22 points on February 18, 2007, against Notre Dame, and 20 on February 28 against Seton Hall. At the end of his freshman season, Vaughn was the team leader in points (14.5), assists (3.5) per game and steals per game (1.8); He recorded the second-best scoring average for a Cincinnati freshman behind Dontonio Wingfield, who had averaged 16 points in the 1993–94 season, and he was selected as a member of the All-Big East Rookie Team.

=== Sophomore season ===
Vaughn made his debut as a sophomore on November 9, 2007, in a game against Belmont, scoring 19 points in 37 minutes of play. He then scored a new career high of 36 points against Coastal Carolina on November 6, shooting 12/19 from the field (9/15 on three-pointers) and 3/5 from the free throw line. He was named Big East Player of the Week after scoring 29 points against Syracuse on January 9, 2008, and 25 against Villanova on January 12. On January 23 he scored 34 points against UConn, shooting 10/14 from the field, including 8 out of 11 three-pointers. During the 2008 Big East tournament, Vaughn scored 30 points against Pittsburgh on March 12, including 20 consecutive points and 23 in the second half; Cincinnati lost the game 64–70.

Vaughn finished the season as the team leader in points (17.3), assists (4.2) and minutes per game (33.4), ranking 5th in scoring in the Big East, 9th in assists per game and 4th in 3-point field goal percentage (a career-high 39.8%), and was named in the All-Big East First Team.

=== Junior season ===
Before the start of the 2008–09 season, Vaughn was selected in the preseason All-Big East Team, the only player of Cincinnati to receive a nomination in the team. Vaughn was also the top scoring returning guard of the Big East. Vaughn was again a member of the team's starting lineup, and made his season debut on November 16, 2008, against South Dakota, scoring 12 points in 28 minutes; with these points, Vaughn reached the 1,000 career points milestone at Cincinnati (the 45th player to do so in Bearcats history). Vaughn came off the bench for only 1 game during the season, on December 6 against UAB, and scored 16 points in 33 minutes of play. On December 13, Vaughn scored a then season-high 27 points against Xavier, including 5 3-point field goals. On December 20, he played 44 minutes in an overtime win against Eastern Kentucky, scoring 20 points along with 7 assists. Vaughn had a career-high 10 assists against Marquette on January 4, 2009. On February 4, in a game against Notre Dame, Vaughn scored 34 points, a season high and the second best mark of his career, making 19 of 22 free throws. During the Big East tournament, Vaughn had 15 points and 4 steals against DePaul in a 57–67 loss. At the end of the season he led the team in scoring (15.3 points), assists (4.7), steals (1.3) and minutes (35.8) per game, and ranked 8th in the Big East in assists per game. He received the second all-conference selection of his career, being named in the All-Big East Third Team.

=== Senior season ===
Vaughn entered his senior season as a preseason First-team All-Big East selection, and he was included in the John R. Wooden Award watchlist. He made his season debut on November 16, 2009, against Prairie View A&M, scoring 15 points along with 5 rebounds. On November 18, Vaughn scored 13 points against Toledo, reaching the 1,500 career points mark. On December 19, in a game against Lipscomb, Vaughn had 7 assists, which made him 3rd all-time for assists made at Cincinnati, passing Oscar Robertson. On January 24, 2010, he became the second player for career assists, passing Steve Logan after posting 5 assists against Louisville. On March 2, 2010, in a game against Villanova, Vaughn scored 18 points and thus surpassed the 1,800 career points mark. On March 17, during the 2010 National Invitation Tournament, Vaughn became Cincinnati's all-time leader in assists and 3-pointers made against Weber State.

Vaughn finished his career with 1,885 career points, which at the time ranked him 3rd in Cincinnati history (4th as of 2020); he also ranked first in assists with 511, minutes with 4,310, games started with 123, and 3-point field goals made with 313. He's the only player to have recorded at least 1,800 points and 500 assists with the Cincinnati Bearcats.

=== College statistics ===
Year	Team	GP	GS	MPG	FG%	3P%	FT%	RPG	APG	SPG	BPG	PPG
2006–07	Cincinnati	30	27	33.0	.373	.292	.753	3.4	3.5	1.8	0.0	14.5
2007–08	Cincinnati	32	32	33.4	.436	.398	.789	2.9	4.2	1.0	0.1	17.3
2008–09	Cincinnati	32	31	35.8	.388	.338	.808	4.0	4.7	1.3	0.0	15.3
2009–10	Cincinnati	35	33	30.5	.378	.338	.827	3.5	3.5	1.2	0.1	11.7
Career		129	123	33.1	.395	.343	.796	3.5	4.0	1.3	0.0	14.6

== Professional career ==
After the end of his senior season at Cincinnati, Vaughn was automatically eligible for the 2010 NBA draft, where he went undrafted. In August 2010, Vaighn signed a professional contract with the Polpharma Starogard Gdański of the Polish Basketball League. In his first season with the club he averaged 11.6 points, 4 rebounds and 3.5 assists in 29 minutes per game during the regular season; he also played 8 games during the Polish Basketball Cup, averaging 10.3 points per game. His team won the Polish Cup that year, beating Anwil Włocławek in the final game, 75–67.

Vaughn moved to Ukraine in 2011, signing for MBC Mykolaiv, a team of the Ukrainian SuperLeague, and in 37 games he averaged 9.1 points, 3.8 rebounds and 4.6 assists per game. He then joined MIA Academy, a team of the Georgian Superliga, for the 2012–13 season. With the new team Vaughn won the league title, the national cup and he was named an all-star.

Vaughn went back to Polpharma Starogard Gdański for the 2013–14 preseason, but left before playing any official match, and signed for Atomerőmű SE of the Nemzeti Bajnokság I/A, the first level of Hungarian basketball, in late September 2013. During the 2013–14 season, Vaughn played 20 games during the regular season (11.2 points, 3.7 rebounds and 5.5 assists per game) and 9 games during the postseason (13.2 points per game). He also had the chance to debut at international level, playing 6 games during the 2013–14 EuroChallenge (7.3 points, 2 rebounds, 3.7 assists per game).

In August 2014, Vaughn went back to Poland and signed for Anwil Włocławek. In the 2014–15 PLK season he played 29 games and posted averages of 11.6 points, 2.9 rebounds and 5.1 assists per game, while shooting 38.8% from three, a career high in his professional career. On April 21, 2015, Vaughn signed a 2-month contract with Paris-Levallois of the LNB Pro A, the first level of French basketball. He played 5 games with the club, averaging 3.2 points, 1.8 rebounds and 1.8 assists in 12.4 minutes per game. In June 2015 he left France for Cyprus and signed for AEK Larnaca. He had the chance to play in the 2015–16 FIBA Europe Cup with AEK, and in 5 games he averaged 11.2 points, 4 rebounds and 4.6 assists.

In December 2015, Vaughn joined Pro B team Boulazac Basket Dordogne, replacing Matt Carlino. In 8 games, Vaughn averaged 7 points and 3.3 assists in the second tier of French basketball.

Vaughn then went back to Georgia and signed for BC Dinamo Tbilisi, and played 27 regular season games in the 2016–17 Georgian Superliga, averaging 13.7 points, 3.1 rebounds and 5.1 assists; he then played 3 games during the playoffs, averaging 17 points per game while shooting 38.9% from the three point line, and won his second Superliga title. Vaughn then spent the 2017–18 season in Hungary with Zalakerámia ZTE: in the 2017–18 Nemzeti Bajnokság I/A he played 34 regular season games (14.8 points, 3.4 rebounds, 5.4 assists) shooting a career-high 41.3% from three. He also played 4 playoff games, and averaged 13 points and 3.8 assists.

After playing for Bearcat Jam in The Basketball Tournament 2018, Vaughn spent the 2018–19 in Cyprus with APOEL. On March 6, 2020, Vaughn signed for Polpharma Starogard Gdański, his second stint with the club.
