= 2016–17 Georgian Superliga =

17th season of the Georgian Superliga

Superliga
- Teams: 8

Finals
- Champions: Dinamo
- Runners-up: Kutaisi

The 2016–17 Georgian Superliga was the 17th season of the Georgian Superliga since its establishment. Kutaisi were the defending champions, but could not retain the title after losing to Dinamo in the finals.

== Regular season ==
| Pos | Team | Pld | W | L | PF | PA | PD | Pts | Qualification |
|---|---|---|---|---|---|---|---|---|---|
| 1 | Dinamo | 28 | 25 | 3 | 2442 | 1999 | +443 | 53 | Qualification to playoffs |
| 2 | Kutaisi | 28 | 20 | 8 | 2663 | 2117 | +546 | 48 | Qualification to playoffs |
| 3 | Cactus | 28 | 14 | 14 | 2217 | 2323 | −106 | 42 | Qualification to playoffs |
| 4 | Rustavi | 28 | 13 | 15 | 2175 | 2259 | −84 | 41 | Qualification to playoffs |
| 5 | Sokhumi | 28 | 11 | 17 | 2224 | 2355 | −131 | 39 | Qualification to relegation playoffs |
| 6 | Mgzavrebi | 28 | 10 | 18 | 2099 | 2195 | −96 | 38 | Qualification to relegation playoffs |
| 7 | Olimpi (Note: One point docked to Olimpi.) | 28 | 10 | 18 | 2018 | 2080 | −62 | 37 | Qualification to relegation playoffs |
| 8 | Batumi | 28 | 9 | 19 | 2132 | 2242 | −110 | 37 | Qualification to relegation playoffs |

Source: Georgian Basketball Federation

== Play-offs ==
Semi-finals
Dinamo | 91 | 81 | 112
Rustavi | 58 | 77 | 86
Kutaisi | 85 | 82 | 69 | 81
Cactus | 83 | 67 | 84 | 68

Final
Dinamo | 81 | 88 | 93
Kutaisi | 74 | 65 | 76

== Relegation play-offs ==
Semi-finals
Mgzavrebi | 101
Batumi | 69
Sokhumi | 111
Olimpi | 94

Final
Olimpi | 116
Mgzavrebi | 119
