= Stevan Milošević =

Montenegrin basketball player

Free agent
- Position: Center

Personal information
- Born: 13 October 1985 (age 41) Bar, SR Montenegro, SFR Yugoslavia
- Listed height: 2.11 m (6 ft 11 in)
- Listed weight: 125 kg (276 lb)

Career information
- NBA draft: 2007: undrafted
- Playing career: 2003–present

Career history
- 2003–2007: Budućnost Podgorica
- 2003–2004: → Budućnost Ljubović
- 2007–2008: Arkadia Traiskirchen Lions
- 2008: Crvena zvezda
- 2009: Köln 99ers
- 2010: Partizan
- 2010: JDA Dijon Basket
- 2011: Nizhny Novgorod
- 2011: AEL Limassol
- 2011: Trabzonspor
- 2012: Mornar Bar
- 2012: Bucaneros de La Guaira
- 2012: Sokhumi Tbilisi
- 2012–2013: Olimpi Tbilisi
- 2013–2014: Dinamo Tbilisi
- 2014–2015: BCM U Pitesti
- 2015–2016: Polski Cukier Toruń
- 2016–2017: Union Olimpija

Career highlights
- Montenegrin League champion (2007); Georgian League champion (2014); Slovenian League champion (2017); Montenegrin Cup winner (2007); Serbian Cup winner (2010); Slovenian Cup winner (2017)

Stevan Milošević (born 13 October 1985) is a Montenegrin professional basketball player who last played for Union Olimpija of the Slovenian League. He is a 2.11 m tall center.
