= Giorgi Sharabidze =

Georgian basketball player

No. 1 – Tskhum-Abkhazeti
- Position: Center
- League: Georgian Superliga

Personal information
- Born: April 27, 1990 (age 36) Baghdati, Georgia
- Listed height: 6 ft 10 in (2.08 m)

Career history
- 2009–2010: Valencia BC
- 2010–2014: Armia
- 2014: Körmend
- 2014–2015: MIA Academy
- 2015–2016: Dinamo Tbilisi
- 2016–2017: Feni Industries
- 2017–2018: Dinamo Tbilisi
- 2018: MIA Academy
- 2018–2019: Albacete Basket
- 2019–present: Tskhum-Abkhazeti

Giorgi Sharabidze is a Georgian professional basketball who plays for Tskhum-Abkhazeti. He has also played for Feni Industries of the Macedonian First League.
