= Rati Andronikashvili =

Georgian basketball player

Rati Andronikashvili რატი ანდრონიკაშვილი
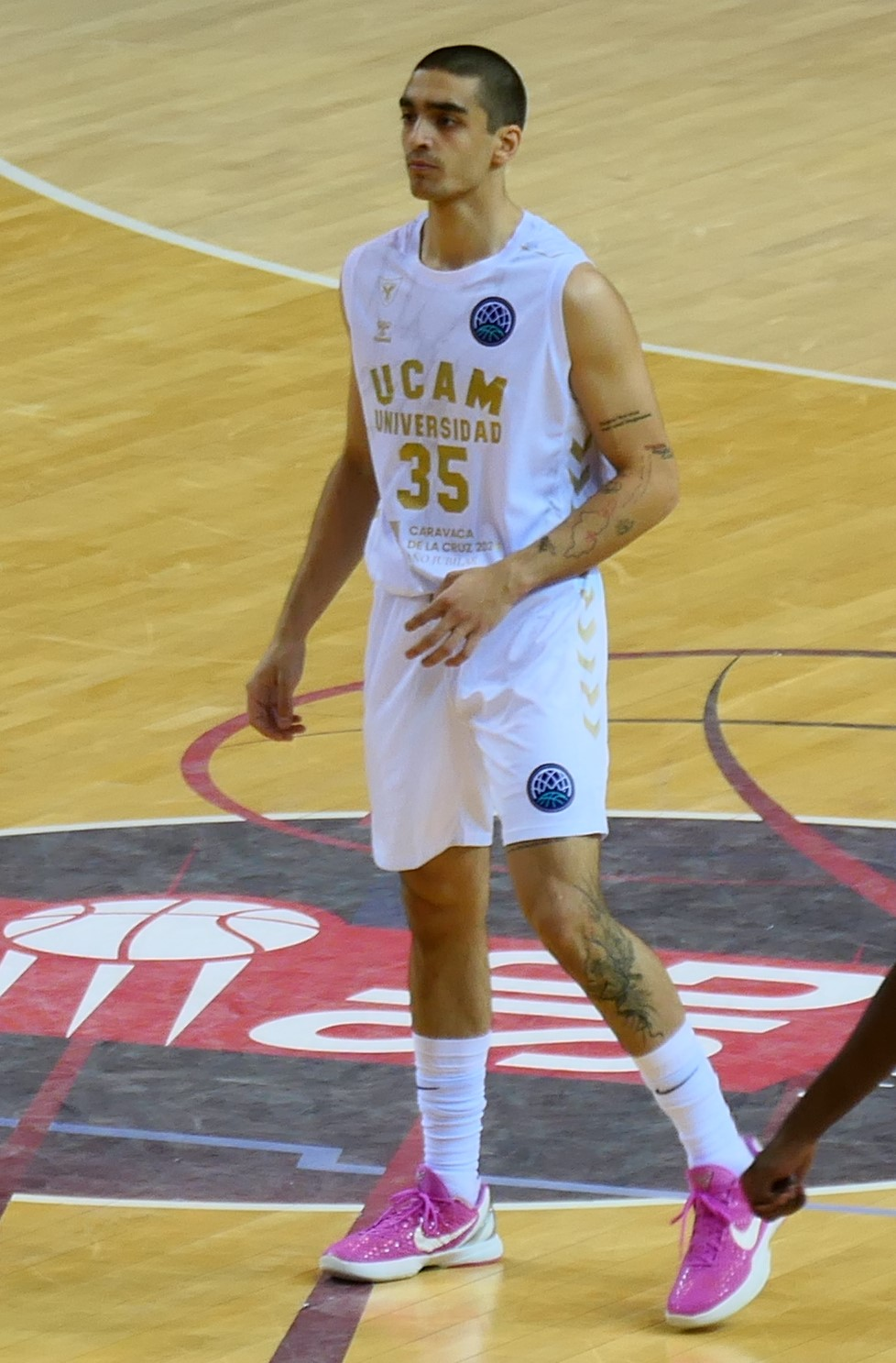
- Andronikashvili with UCAM Murcia in 2022

No. 88 – BC Andorra
- Position: Point guard / shooting guard
- League: Liga ACB

Personal information
- Born: 19 March 2001 (age 25) Tbilisi, Georgia
- Listed height: 1.93 m (6 ft 4 in)
- Listed weight: 84.5 kg (186 lb)

Career information
- College: Creighton (2021–2022)
- Playing career: 2019–present

Career history
- 2019–2020: Ionikos Nikaias
- 2020: BC Rustavi
- 2022–2023: UCAM Murcia
- 2023: BC TSU Tbilisi
- 2023–2024: Basket Zaragoza
- 2024: VEF Rīga
- 2024–2025: Obradoiro
- 2025–2026: Álftanes
- 2026–present: BC Andorra

Rati Andronikashvili (Georgian: რატი ანდრონიკაშვილი; born 19 March 2001 in Tbilisi, Georgia) is a Georgian professional basketball player for BC Andorra of the Liga ACB. Listed at 6 feet 4 inches (1.93 m) and 186 pounds (84 kg), he plays the point guard and shooting guard positions. He played college basketball for the Creighton Bluejays.

== Career ==
Andronikashvili joined BC Rustavi of the Georgian Superliga in 2020. He averaged 7.0 points, 1.0 rebound, and 1.0 assist per game. In May 2020, Andronikashvili signed with Creighton Bluejays men's basketball of the NCAA Division I college basketball in the United States. At that time, he was graded as a 95th and ranked as the No. 64 overall prospect and No. 13 point guard in the 2020 recruiting class.

On November 6, 2020, Andronikashvili tore an ACL in practice, forcing him to miss the season.

On November 27, 2022, he signed with UCAM Murcia of the Liga ACB.

On October 28, 2024, he signed a three-week deal with VEF Riga.

In November 2025, Andronikashvili signed with Álftanes of the Úrvalsdeild karla.

== National team career ==
Andronikashvili has been a member of the Georgian national basketball team. In the past, he had been a member of the Georgian national under-18 basketball team and the Georgian national under-16 basketball team. At the 2019 FIBA U18 European Championship Division B, he averaged 17.4 points, 5.9 rebounds and 4.0 assists.
