= Nika Darbaidze =

Georgian basketball player

No. 15 – BC TSU Tbilisi
- Position: Small forward / power forward
- League: Georgian Superliga

Personal information
- Born: 3 March 1998 (age 28) Gori, Georgia
- Listed height: 2.04 m (6 ft 8 in)

Career information
- Playing career: 2015–present

Career history
- 2015: MIA Academy Tbilisi
- 2016: Mieres
- 2016–2017: Murcia
- 2017–2019: Olimpi Tbilisi
- 2019: Lovćen 1947
- 2020: Olimpi Tbilisi
- 2020–2021: Dinamo Tbilisi
- 2021-present: BC TSU Tbilisi

Nika Darbaidze (Georgian: ნიკა დარბაიძე) (born 3 March 1998) is a Georgian basketball player for BC TSU Tbilisi of the Georgian Superliga and the Georgian national team.

== National team career ==
Darbaidze has been constantly called up for the Georgian national team since 2017. He has represented Georgia at U16, U18, and U20 national teams.
