= Anatoli Boisa =

Georgian professional basketball player

Sabah BC
- Position: Assistant coach
- League: Azerbaijan Basketball League; Champions League

Personal information
- Born: 9 September 1983 (age 43) Rustavi, Georgian SSR, Soviet Union
- Listed height: 6 ft 4 in (1.93 m)
- Listed weight: 200 lb (91 kg)

Career information
- College: Midland (2002–2004)
- NBA draft: 2005: undrafted
- Playing career: 2001–2019

Career history

Playing
- 2001–2002: Azoti Rustavi
- 2004: SV Halle
- 2004–2008: Tuji Rustavi
- 2008–2009: Aviamsheni Tbilisi
- 2009–2010: BC Rustavi
- 2010–2014: BC Armia
- 2014-2017: Kutaisi 2010
- 2017-2019: Cactus Tbilisi

Coaching
- 2019-present: Georgia (assistant)
- 2019-2024: BC Rustavi
- 2024: Sagesse Club (Assistant)
- 2024: Maroussi B.C. (assistant)
- 2024-25: Sagesse Club (assistant)
- 2026: B.C. Telavi
- 2026–present: Sabah BC (assistant)

Anatoli Boisa (Georgian: ანატოლი ბოისა born 9 September 1983) is a Georgian professional retired basketball player. Currently, he is the current assistant coach of Sabah BC of the Azerbaijan Basketball League (ABL), and the Georgian national basketball team.

He represented the Georgian national basketball team at the EuroBasket 2017 qualification.
