= Manuchar Markoishvili =

Georgian former professional basketball player

- Markoishvili with Galatasaray in 2026

Galatasaray
- Title: Head coach
- League: Basketbol Süper Ligi; Champions League

Personal information
- Born: 17 November 1986 (age 39) Tbilisi, Georgian SSR, USSR
- Listed height: 6 ft 5.75 in (1.97 m)
- Listed weight: 210 lb (95 kg)

Career information
- NBA draft: 2007: undrafted
- Playing career: 2000–2019
- Position: Small forward / shooting guard
- Number: 9, 11

Career history

Playing
- 2000–2002: Batumi
- 2002–2004: Benetton Treviso
- 2004: Mitteldeutscher BC
- 2004–2007: Union Olimpija
- 2007–2009: Kyiv
- 2009–2013: Pallacanestro Cantù
- 2013–2014: Galatasaray
- 2014–2015: CSKA Moscow
- 2015–2016: Darüşşafaka
- 2017–2018: Pallacanestro Reggiana

Coaching
- 2019–2024: Georgia (assistant)
- 2020–2021: BC Titebi
- 2021–2026: AS Monaco (assistant)
- 2024, 2026: AS Monaco (interim)
- 2026–present: Galatasaray

Career highlights
- As player: FIBA EuroCup Challenge champion (2004); VTB United League champion (2015); Turkish League champion (2013); Italian Supercup winner (2012); Italian Supercup MVP (2012); ABA League All-Star (2007); 2× Slovenian League champion (2005–2006); 2× Slovenian Cup winner (2005–2006); Italian League champion (2003); Italian Cup winner (2003); 2× Georgian Superliga champion (2001–2002); As assistant coach: 3× French League champion (2023, 2024, 2026); 2× French Cup winner (2023, 2026); French League Cup winner (2026); French Supercup winner (2025)

Manuchar "Manu" Markoishvili (Georgian: მანუჩარ მარკოიშვილი, born 17 November 1986) is a former Georgian professional basketball player and coach who is the current head coach for Galatasaray of the Turkish Basketbol Süper Ligi (BSL) and the Champions League (BCL).

== Early career ==
Markoishvili as a young basketball player was very talented, and he turned into a professional basketball player in Georgia before he graduated from high school. He played for Basco Batumi in the 2001–02 season. In Basco, he distinguished himself, even though he was the youngest player of the team.

== Professional career ==
Markoishvili was scouted and recruited by the Italian League club Benetton Treviso in 2002. He would even play in the EuroLeague at the young age of 15 years old, being the youngest player to participate in the event at the time. In 2004, he was loaned to Mitteldeutscher of the German League for the season, and with them he won the FIBA Europe Cup.

In 2004, he moved to the Slovenian club Olimpija Ljubljana. He entered the 2007 NBA draft, but he went undrafted. In 2007, he was transferred to the Ukrainian League club BC Kyiv. From 2009 to 2013, he played with Pallacanestro Cantù of the Italian League.

On 29 January 2013 Markoishvili signed with the Turkish team Galatasaray, for the rest of the 2013–14 season.

On 11 July 2014 Markoishvili signed a two-year contract with the Russian team CSKA Moscow. In his first season with the team, CSKA Moscow won the 2014–15 VTB United League season, after eliminating Khimki, with a 3–0 series sweep in the league's playoff finals. On 24 July 2015 he parted ways with CSKA.

On 20 August 2015 he signed with the Turkish club Darüşşafaka, of the BSL.

On 26 August 2017 he signed with the Italian club Pallacanestro Reggiana, of the LBA.

On 17 September 2019 he announced his retirement at the age of 32.

== National team career ==
Markoishvili was a member of the senior men's Georgian national basketball team. With Georgia's senior national team, he played at EuroBasket 2011, EuroBasket 2013, and at Eurobasket 2017. Soon after his retirement, he was appointed to the assistant coaches job with the Georgian national basketball team. He stepped down from his position as an assistant coach in 2024.

== Coaching career ==
On 16 October 2026, Markoishvili sgined with Galatasaray of the Turkish Basketbol Süper Ligi (BSL) as head coach, returning to the club where he played during the 2013–14 season.

== Career statistics ==
Legend
GP	Games played	GS	Games started	MPG	Minutes per game
FG%	Field-goal percentage	3P%	3-point field-goal percentage	FT%	Free-throw percentage
RPG	Rebounds per game	APG	Assists per game	SPG	Steals per game
BPG	Blocks per game	PPG	Points per game	PIR	Performance index rating
**Bold**	Career high

=== EuroLeague ===
*	Led the league

Year	Team	GP	GS	MPG	FG%	3P%	FT%	RPG	APG	SPG	BPG	PPG	PIR
2002–03	Treviso	17	0	7.7	**.500**	**.500**	.400	.9	.5	.4	—	2.2	0.9
2003–04	Treviso	6	0	7.2	.300	.429	**1.000**	.7	.5	.2	—	1.8	1.0
2004–05	Olimpija	8	0	10.5	.235	.000	.909	1.4	.3	.3	—	2.3	0.8
2005–06	Olimpija	5	5	23.2	.444	.455	.500	2.2	.8	1.2	—	8.6	3.4
2006–07	Olimpija	14	**13**	**30.6**	.427	.296	.690	**2.9**	1.4	**1.4**	—	10.6	8.0
2011–12	Cantù	16	8	21.1	.412	.385	**1.000***	2.7	1.6	.9	.1	9.1	8.3
2012–13	Cantù	10	9	27.1	.376	.439	.929	2.5	**1.7**	1.3	**.2**	**12.6**	**9.5**
2013–14	Galatasaray	10	10	25.6	.439	.415	.571	2.5	1.6	1.0	.1	7.9	6.3
2014–15	CSKA Moscow	18	3	10.7	.457	.360	.867	1.2	.8	.4	.1	3.6	3.0
2015–16	Darüşşafaka	**22**	10	20.3	.394	.329	.714	1.1	1.4	.9	.0	6.2	3.3
Career		126	58	18.3	.411	.367	.809	1.8	1.1	.8	.1	6.4	4.5

== Personal life ==
His father, Nugzar Markoishvili, is a retired professional basketball player, who is currently a basketball coach at Tbilisi State University. Markoishvili's brother, Giorgi, is also a professional basketball player in Georgia.

== See also ==
- List of youngest EuroLeague players
