= Duda Sanadze =

Georgian basketball player

Duda Sanadze დუდა სანაძე
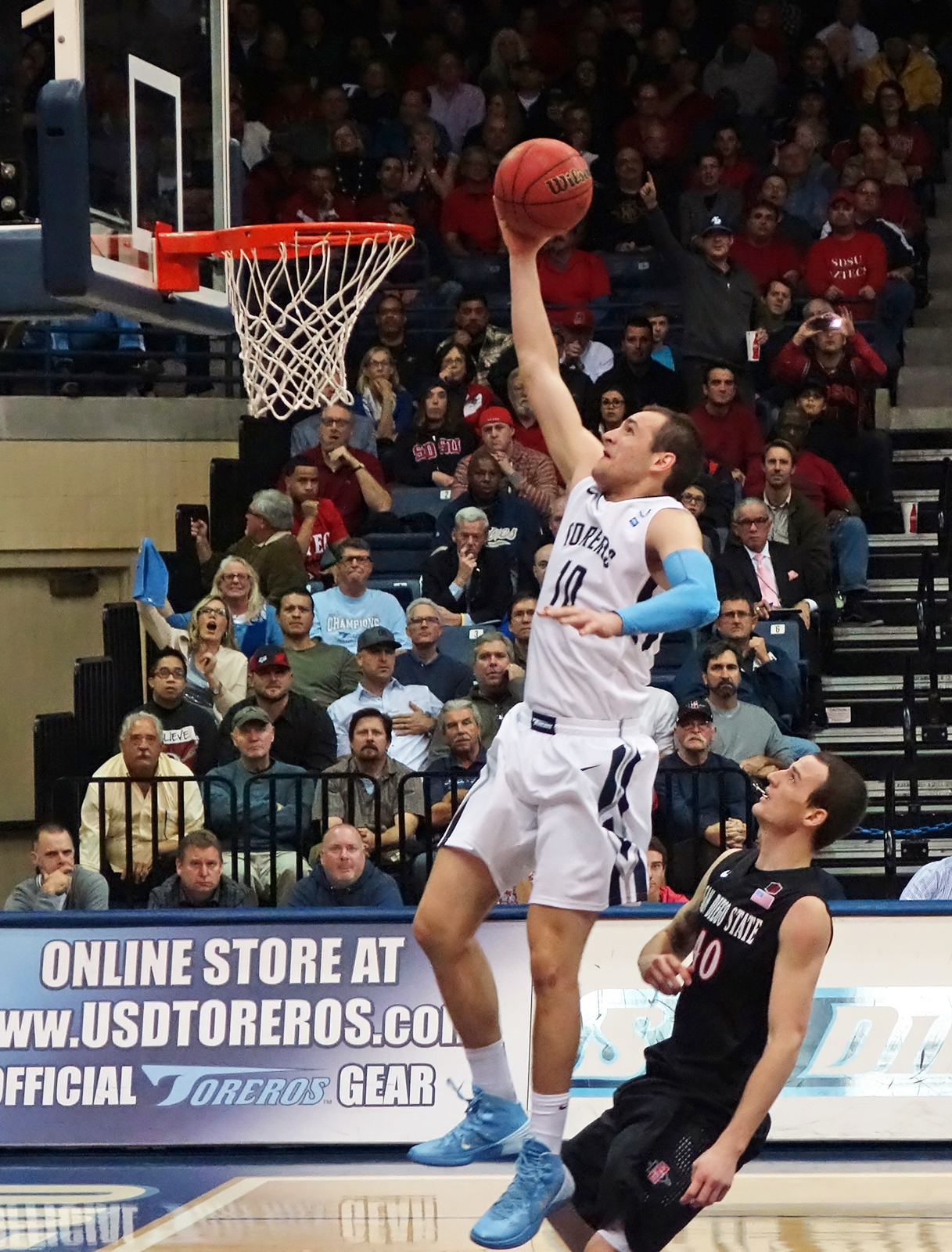
- Sanadze with the Toreros in 2013

No. 7 – Palmer Basket
- Position: Shooting guard
- League: Primera FEB

Personal information
- Born: 25 July 1992 (age 33) Tbilisi, Georgia
- Listed height: 1.97 m (6 ft 6 in)
- Listed weight: 95 kg (209 lb)

Career information
- College: San Diego (2012–2016)
- NBA draft: 2016: undrafted
- Playing career: 2009–present

Career history
- 2009–2010: Dinamo Tbilisi
- 2010–2011: Rustavi
- 2011: Batumi
- 2011–2012: Dinamo Tbilisi
- 2016: KK Lastovka
- 2016–2017: Primorska
- 2017: Pistoia 2000
- 2018: Gipuzkoa Basket
- 2018-2019: Rosa Radom
- 2019–2020: U.D. Oliveirense
- 2020: Al-Khor SC
- 2020–2022: Borac Čačak
- 2022–2023: Anorthosis Ammochostou
- 2023–2024: Atomerőmű SE
- 2024: Anorthosis Ammochostou
- 2024: Halcones de Xalapa
- 2025: Esperos Lamias
- 2025: AL-Nasr Dubai
- 2025–present: Palmer Basket

Career highlights
- Cypriot League All-Star (2022); Cypriot League First Team Of The Year (2022); Cypriot League Newcomer Of The Year (2022); Portuguese Basketball League Cup Winner (2020); Liga OTP banka Best Scorer (2017); UAE National Basketball League Cup Winner (2025)

Duda Sanadze (Georgian: დუდა სანაძე) (born 25 July 1992) is a Georgian professional basketball player for Palmer Basket of the Primera FEB.

== Playing career ==
In February 2021, Sanadze signed for Serbian team Borac Čačak. In May 2021, he signed a one-year contract extension.

On November 11, 2025, he signed for Palmer Basket of the Spanish Primera FEB.

== National team career ==
Sanadze has been a member of the Georgian national team since 2013.
