= Konstantin Anikenko =

Ukrainian professional basketball player

No. 20 – Kyiv-Basket
- Position: Center
- League: Ukrainian Basketball Super League

Personal information
- Born: November 9, 1992 (age 34) Odesa, Ukraine
- Listed height: 2.18 m (7 ft 2 in)

Career history
- 2008–2010: Odesa
- 2011–2014: Budivelnyk
- 2014: Dnipro-Azot
- 2014–2015: Budivelnyk
- 2015–2016: VITA Tbilisi
- 2016: MBC Mykolaiv
- 2016–2017: Kožuv
- 2017–2019: MBC Mykolaiv
- 2019–2021: MBK Lucenec
- 2021–present: Kyiv-Basket

Konstantin Anikenko (born November 9, 1992) is a Ukrainian professional basketball player for Kyiv-Basket of the UA SuperLeague and FIBA Europe Cup.
