= Otar Korkia =

Georgian basketball player and coach

- Otar Korkia, during a basketball game

Personal information
- Born: 10 May 1923 Kutaisi, Georgian SSR, Soviet Union
- Died: 15 March 2005 (aged 81) Tbilisi, Georgia
- Listed height: 1.95 m (6 ft 5 in)
- Listed weight: 93 kg (205 lb)

Career information
- Playing career: 1940–1958
- Position: Center
- Number: 7, 10
- Coaching career: 1958–1970

Career history

Playing
- 1940–1947: Dinamo Kutaisi
- 1947–1958: Dinamo Tbilisi

Coaching
- 1958–1959: Soviet Union Under-20
- 1959–1968: Dinamo Tbilisi
- 1968–1970: Cambodia

Career highlights
- As player: FIBA's 50 Greatest Players (1991); 3× Soviet League champion (1950, 1953, 1954); 2× Soviet Cup winner (1949, 1950); Honored Master of Sports of the USSR (1950); Order of Lenin (1957); Order of Honor (Georgia); Best Georgian Basketball Player of the 20th Century; Best Georgian Sportsman of the 20th Century; As head coach: EuroLeague champion (1962); Honored Coach of the USSR (1967)
Medals
Representing Soviet Union
Men's basketball
Summer Olympic Games
Silver medal – second place	1952 Helsinki
FIBA EuroBasket
Gold medal – first place	1947 Prague
Gold medal – first place	1951 Paris
Gold medal – first place	1953 Moscow
Bronze medal – third place	1955 Budapest

Otar Korkia (Georgian: ოთარ ქორქია, Russian: Отар Михайлович Коркия; 10 May 1923 – 15 March 2005) was a Georgian professional basketball player and coach. He was named one of FIBA's 50 Greatest Players, in 1991. He was also named the Best Georgian Basketball Player of the 20th Century, and the Best Georgian Sportsman of the 20th Century. He was born in Kutaisi.

== Club career ==
During his club career, Korkia played with Dinamo Kutaisi, from 1940 to 1947, and with Dinamo Tbilisi, from 1947 to 1958. He won three USSR League championships (1950, 1953, and 1954) and two USSR Cups, (1949 and 1950).

== National team career ==
Korkia was a member of the senior Soviet Union national basketball team, which won the silver medal at the 1952 Summer Olympic Games. He played in seven games during that tournament. He later became the captain of the senior Soviet national team.

He also won gold medals at the 1947 EuroBasket, the 1951 EuroBasket, and the 1953 EuroBasket. Additionally, he won the bronze medal at the 1955 EuroBasket.

== Coaching career ==
Korkia was the head coach of Dinamo Tbilisi, when the club won the FIBA European Champions Cup (later called EuroLeague) championship, in the 1961–62 season. He was named an Honored Coach of the USSR, in 1967.

== Titles won ==
=== Player ===
- USSR League (3): 1950, 1953, 1954
- USSR Cup (2): 1949, 1950
- EuroBasket (3): 1947, 1951, 1953

=== Head coach ===
- EuroLeague (1): 1962

== Personal life ==
Korkia died in Tbilisi, aged 81. His nephew, Mikheil, was also a well-known senior Soviet national basketball team player.

== See also ==
- List of EuroLeague-winning head coaches
