= Maccabi Brinkford Tbilisi =

Georgian professional basketball club

Maccabi Brinkford Tbilisi is a Georgian professional basketball club, that is based in Tbilisi, Georgia. The club competes in the Georgian Super Liga.
