= B.C. VITA Tbilisi =

VITA Tbilisi
- Leagues: A-Liga
- Founded: 1992; 34 years ago
- Arena: Tbilisi Sports Palace
- Capacity: 9,700
- Location: Tbilisi, Georgia
- President: Temur Datikashvili
- Vice-president: Kakha Shengelia
- Team manager: Levan Mikeladze
- Head coach: Nikolajs Mazurs
- Championships: 7 Georgian Championships
- Website: bcvita.com
Home	Away

B.C. VITA Tbilisi is a professional basketball team based in Tbilisi, Georgia. Home games of the club are played in the Tbilisi Sports Palace, which has a capacity of 9,700 people. The club currently plays in the A-Liga, the second tier of basketball in Georgia.

== History ==
During the '90s VITA dominated the Georgian Superliga, and won 6 consecutive championships from 1993 through 1998. In the 2015–16 season, they entered the VTB United League.

== Honours ==
- Georgian Superliga
  - Winners (6): 1992–93, 1993–94, 1994–95, 1995–96, 1996–97, 1997–98

== Players ==
=== Roster for 2015-16 VTB League ===
BC Vita Tbilisi roster
Players
Coaches

Pos.	No.	Nat.	Name	Ht.	Wt.	Age
F	4	(Georgia (country))	Maisuradze, Davit	2.10 m (6 ft 11 in)	100 kg (220 lb)	36 – 3 May 1990
G	5	(Georgia (country))	Chlaidze, Irakli	1.97 m (6 ft 6 in)	78 kg (172 lb)	36 – 7 December 1989
PF	6	(Georgia (country))	Bitadze, Goga	2.01 m (6 ft 7 in)	112 kg (247 lb)	27 – 20 July 1999
F	7	(Georgia (country))	Berishvili, Mikheil	2.04 m (6 ft 8 in)	98 kg (216 lb)	39 – 12 April 1987
SG	8	(Georgia (country))	Bokolishvili, Merab	1.93 m (6 ft 4 in)	84 kg (185 lb)	34 – 26 February 1992
F	9	(Georgia (country))	Revazashvili, Maizer	2.07 m (6 ft 9 in)	96 kg (212 lb)	29 – 19 December 1996
PG	10	(Georgia (country))	Zakradze, Luka	1.90 m (6 ft 3 in)	87 kg (192 lb)	30 – 10 April 1996
SF	11	(Georgia (country))	Shengelia, Levan	2.04 m (6 ft 8 in)	118 kg (260 lb)	35 – 31 August 1990
G	13	(Russia)	Staratelev, Vladislav	1.96 m (6 ft 5 in)	88 kg (194 lb)	30 – 4 June 1996
PG	15	(United States)	Henry, Pierriá	1.93 m (6 ft 4 in)	88 kg (194 lb)	33 – 20 January 1993
C	20	(Ukraine)	Anikenko, Konstantin	2.18 m (7 ft 2 in)	97 kg (214 lb)	33 – 9 October 1992

Head coach

- (Latvia) Nikolajs Mazurs

Legend

- (C) Team captain
- Injured
