= Levan Moseshvili =

Russian basketball player (1940–2020)

Personal information
- Born: 23 May 1940 Tbilisi, Georgian SSR, Soviet Union
- Died: 5 March 2020 (aged 79) Tbilisi, Georgia
- Height: 1.98 m (6 ft 6 in)
- Weight: 96 kg (212 lb)

Sport
- Sport: Basketball
- Club: Dynamo Tbilisi
Medal record
Representing Soviet Union
Olympic Games
Silver medal – second place	1964 Tokyo	Team

Levan Georgievich Moseshvili (Georgian: ლევან მოსეშვილი; Russian: Леван Мосешвили; 23 May 1940 – 5 March 2020) was a Georgian basketball player. Playing for the Soviet team he won a silver medal at the 1964 Summer Olympics. Between 1972 and 1998 he was the head coach of Dynamo Tbilisi and after that headed the Georgian team.
