= Olympic Palace =

Sports venue in Tbilisi, Georgia

Tbilisi Olympic Palace
- ოლიმპიური სასახლე
- Tbilisi New Sports Palace
- Entrance to Olympic Sports Palace in 2017
- Interactive map of Tbilisi Olympic Palace
- Location: Tbilisi, Georgia
- Coordinates: 41.7181°N 44.7279°E
- Owner: Government of Georgia
- Capacity: Grand Hall: 3,600 (sports) or 4,000 (concerts); Tbilisi Arena: 10,000 (basketball)

Construction
- Groundbreaking: January 2015
- Opened: 13 July 2015
- Expanded: 2022 (arena)

Olympic Palace (Georgian: ოლიმპიური სასახლე, romanized: olimp'iuri sasakhle) is an indoor sports arena situated in Tbilisi, Georgia, which was built to be used as one of the venues for the 2015 European Youth Summer Olympic Festival. А new basketball arena was added to the complex in 2022.

== Construction and facilities ==
Opened on 13 July 2015 by Georgia's Prime Minister Irakli Garibashvili, the complex features two halls that are capable of hosting several sports, such as handball, basketball, volleyball, judo, wrestling, futsal, fencing and other games and tournaments. The seated capacity for the Grand Hall (also known as the main hall) is 3,600 for sporting events while the smaller hall can hold 800 spectators. The Olympic Palace also includes a VIP lounge, conference and media rooms, a cafe and car parking area with space for 260 cars.

=== Tbilisi Arena ===
Tbilisi Arena during the opening day of EuroBasket 2022

The complex was expanded with a new 10,000-seat indoor basketball arena next to the Olympic Palace and later hosted the Group A matches of EuroBasket 2022. A tunnel connects the two venues of the complex, with the arena completed by the end of May 2022. Prime Minister Garibashvili visited the new building on the following 11 June. The palace's arena is built in line with modern standards and equipped with the latest technology. The new Sports Palace hosted the first EuroBasket test match on 4 July.

== Events ==
The venue has hosted the 2015, 2016 and 2017 Judo Grand Prix Tbilisi. The Group A round of the UEFA Futsal Euro 2018 qualifying competition was held here from 24 to 27 January 2017. The 4th European Kung Fu Championships and the 2017 Men's Youth World Handball Championship from 8–20 August.

On 26 November 2017, the venue hosted the Junior Eurovision Song Contest 2017; originally, the Tbilisi Sports Palace was selected to host the event, but it was relocated to the Olympic Palace as the former venue was considered "unsuitable". It was originally set to host the Junior Eurovision Song Contest 2025, but the contest was eventually relocated to the Gymnastic Hall of Olympic City at a late stage due to the unavailability of the Olympic Palace for an assessment visit.

Real American Freestyle will present RAF Georgia at the venue on 11 July 2026, headlined by Merab Dvalishvili vs. Henry Cejudo.

Preceded by Mediterranean Conference Centre; Valletta	Junior Eurovision Song Contest; Venue; 2017	Succeeded by Minsk Arena; Minsk
