= BC TSU Tbilisi =

BC Tbilisi State University
- Nickname: Studentebi (The Students)
- Leagues: Georgian Superliga
- Founded: 1991; 34 years ago
- Arena: Olympic Palace
- Capacity: 4,000
- Location: Tbilisi, Georgia
- Team colors
- President: Irakli Kharjavanidze
- Vice-president(s): Giorgi Shamatava
- Team manager: Tornike Tsinadze
- Head coach: Leqso Lapanashvili
- Team captain: Giorgi Tsintsadze
Home	Away

BC TSU is a professional basketball club based in Tbilisi, Georgia. It is affiliated with the Tbilisi State University.

== History ==
T.S.U. was one of the 11 founding members of the Georgian basketball league in 1991. Their best seasons in the league were 2009-10 and 2010-11, when they reached the playoff finals, losing both of them 1–3 against Energy Invest Rustavi and BC Armia respectively.

From 2015 to 2018, TSU-Hyundai played in Georgian A-Liga, winning it in 2018 and receiving a direct promotion to the Georgian Superliga.

The club's greatest success was winning the Georgian Cup in 2006. They also won the Korkia/Sakandelidze Memorial tournament twice in 2011 and 2019, and the Dudu Dadiani Memorial in 2019.

== Team ==
=== Current roster ===
BC TSU roster
Players
Coaches

Pos.	No.	Nat.	Name	Ht.	Wt.	Age
PG	0	(United States)	Abram, Glen	1.90 m (6 ft 3 in)		26 – 28 September 1998
PG	2	(Georgia (country))	Pkhakadze, Otar	1.88 m (6 ft 2 in)		32 – 28 February 1993
PF/C	3	(Georgia (country))	Gorashvili, Luka	2.05 m (6 ft 9 in)		17 – 21 August 2007
F	4	(United States)	Thomas, Davontrey	1.95 m (6 ft 5 in)		23 – 5 October 2001
G/F	5	(Georgia (country))	Geguchadze, Saba	1.96 m (6 ft 5 in)		25 – 10 February 2000
C	7	(United States)	Basham, Carson	2.07 m (6 ft 9 in)		22 – 17 July 2002
PG	8	(Georgia (country))	Tsintsadze, Giorgi (C)	1.93 m (6 ft 4 in)		39 – 7 February 1986
PF/C	9	(Georgia (country))	Isiani, Willy	2.02 m (6 ft 8 in)		27 – 11 August 1997
CG	13	(Georgia (country))	Mgeladze, Aleksandre	1.96 m (6 ft 5 in)		18 – 9 August 2006
G/F	14	(Georgia (country))	Leonidze, Nika	1.91 m (6 ft 3 in)		27 – 14 March 1998
PF	15	(Georgia (country))	Phevadze, Aleksandre	2.06 m (6 ft 9 in)		26 – 15 April 1998
SG	19	(Georgia (country))	Kavlashvili, Mate	1.86 m (6 ft 1 in)		16 – 20 April 2008
G/F	33	(Georgia (country))	Gafrindashvili, Nikoloz	2.00 m (6 ft 7 in)		24 – 3 July 2000

Head coach

- (Georgia (country)) Leqso Lapanashvili

Assistant coach(es)

- (Georgia (country)) Nika Mskhalaia

Athletic trainer(s)

- (Georgia (country)) Iviko Ergemlidze
- (Georgia (country)) Levan Samkharadze

Doctor

- (Georgia (country)) Giorgi Chikhradze

Legend

- (C) Team captain
- Injured
