= BC Sokhumi =

- Leagues: Super Liga
- Founded: 1991; 35 years ago
- History: BC Sokhumi (1991–present)
- Arena: Kekelidze Arena
- Capacity: 2,200
- Location: Sokhumi, Georgia
- Team colors: White and Blue
- President: Mindia Gulua
- Head coach: John Coffino
- Website: Sukhumibc.com
Home	Away

BC Sokhumi (Georgian: ს.კ. სოხუმი) is a professional basketball club from the city of Sokhumi, that plays in the Georgian Superliga. The club is currently based in Tbilisi.

== History ==
The club was established in 1991 in Sokhumi. Shortly afterwards, the War in Abkhazia forced the team to leave their home city, and relocate to the Georgian capital. Nevertheless, they managed to complete the 1992-93 season, and have been playing in Tbilisi ever since.

The club has played under several names over the years ("Sukhumi-91," "Kolkha," "SSU" and, since 2009, as "Sokhumi"). Their best result in the league is 4th place, which they achieved in 2011 and 2012.

In 2011, Sokhumi represented Georgia in the EuroChallenge tournament, but failed to progress through the qualifying round.

For much of its existence, the team has been coached by Vazha Kvaratskhelia.

== Players ==
=== Current roster ===
BC Sokhumi roster
Players
Coaches

Pos.	No.	Nat.	Name	Ht.	Wt.	Age
G/F	4	(Uzbekistan)	Nazmiev, Ruslan	2.00 m (6 ft 7 in)
G	5	(Georgia (country))	Megeneishvili, Sandro	1.90 m (6 ft 3 in)
PF	6	(Georgia (country))	Buliava, Otar	1.98 m (6 ft 6 in)
SF	7	(Georgia (country))	Chlaidze, Irakli	1.96 m (6 ft 5 in)
F	8	(Georgia (country))	Kopaliani, Gela	2.04 m (6 ft 8 in)
G	10	(Georgia (country))	Gasitashvili, Davit	1.92 m (6 ft 4 in)
F	11	(Georgia (country))	Shvangiradze, Grigol	1.96 m (6 ft 5 in)
F	12	(Georgia (country))	Dekanoidze, Davit	1.98 m (6 ft 6 in)
G	13	(Georgia (country))	Baakashvili, Rati	1.90 m (6 ft 3 in)
C	14	(Georgia (country))	Kadaria, Vakhtang	2.06 m (6 ft 9 in)
C	20	(Georgia (country))	Beshkenadze, Irakli	2.06 m (6 ft 9 in)
F/C	22	(Georgia (country))	Kvantaliani, Valeri	2.03 m (6 ft 8 in)

Head coach

- (Georgia (country)) Vazha Kvaratskhelia

Assistant coach(es)

- (Georgia (country)) Temur Kankia

Legend

- (C) Team captain
- Injured

=== Notable players ===
Note: Flags indicate national team eligibility at FIBA-sanctioned events. Players may hold other non-FIBA nationalities not displayed.

Criteria

To appear in this section a player must have either:

- Set a club record or won an individual award while at the club
- Played at least one official international match for their national team at any time
- Played at least one official NBA match at any time.

- (Georgia (country)) Nikoloz Tskitishvili
