= BC Mgzavrebi-Armia =

BC Armia
- Leagues: Georgian Super Liga
- Founded: 2010; 16 years ago
- Arena: Tbilisi Sports Palace
- Capacity: 10,000
- Location: Tbilisi, Georgia
- Team colors: Black and White
- President: Irakli Shanidze
- Head coach: Anatoli Berishvili
- Championships: 2 Super Liga
- Website: BC Armia Tbilisi
Home	Away

BC Armia (Georgian: საკალათბურთო კლუბი არმია), also known as Mgzavrebi Tbilisi, was a professional basketball club based in Tbilisi, that played in the Georgian Super Liga. The club is affiliated to the Georgian Ministry of Defense and still competes in youth tournaments.

== History ==
Armia traces its roots to the first army sports club of Tbilisi, which was formed in 1937 and went on to win the USSR basketball championship twice, in 1944 and 1946. A reformed Army Sports Club (ASK) then participated in the Georgian national championship for three seasons, between 1996 and 1999.

The current club was re-established in 2010, and made its debut in the Superliga on November 6 of that year. Coached by Levan Moseshvili, they established themselves as the strongest team in the country straight away, winning the championship title by defeating TSU Tbilisi 3-1 in the play-off finals. They also won the Georgian Cup, and the Georgian Super Cup that year.

For the 2011–12 season, the coaching role was taken up by former player and club captain Kote Tugushi. The club signed a number of high-profile foreign players, including some with NBA experience, such as Sundiata Gaines, Jeremy Richardson and Guillermo Diaz. Armia competed on international stage in EuroChallenge competition, where they were narrowly eliminated at the group stage. However, they convincingly retained the Superliga title by finishing the regular season without a loss, and defeating BC Olimpi 3-1 in the play-off finals. They once again completed a clean sweep of trophies by winning the Cup and the Super Cup.

The club went into the 2012-13 season with a strong squad that included experienced international players such as Curtis Millage, Marcus Faison and Lamayne Wilson. Nevertheless, Armia were once again eliminated at the group stage of EuroChallenge. A decision by the Ministry of Defence to reduce its funding of the club led to the departure of all foreign players in December. With an all-Georgian squad, Armia still managed to finish in a respectable 3rd position in the Superliga play-offs. However, the club ended the season without a major domestic trophy for the first time since its reformation in 2010.

== Season by season ==
Season	Domestic competitions				Cup competitions	European competitions		
Season	Tier	League	Pos.	Postseason	Georgian Cup	Tier	League	Result
2010–11	1	Super Liga	1	Champion	Champion	–		
2011–12	1	Super Liga	1	Champion	Champion	3	EuroChallenge	Regular season
2012–13	1	Super Liga	4	Semifinalist	Semifinalist	3	EuroChallenge	Regular season
2013–14	1	Super Liga	2			–		

== Roster ==
BC Mgzavrebi-Armia roster
Players
Coaches

Pos.	No.	Nat.	Name	Ht.	Wt.	Age
PG	0	(Georgia (country))	Pertaia, Otar	1.76 m (5 ft 9 in)		26 – 29 February 2000
G/F	1	(Georgia (country))	Bitsadze, Konstantine	1.95 m (6 ft 5 in)		29 – 1 May 1997
SG	10	(Georgia (country))	BIganishvili, Giorgi	1.85 m (6 ft 1 in)		24 – 15 March 2002
C	14	(Georgia (country))	Gognadze, Ioseb	2.05 m (6 ft 9 in)		30 – 21 February 1996
F	18	(Georgia (country))	Baramidze, Davit	1.98 m (6 ft 6 in)		30 – 7 May 1996
G/F	19	(Georgia (country))	Kavtaradze, Giorgi	1.96 m (6 ft 5 in)		29 – 17 April 1997
PF/C		(Georgia (country))	Beshkenadze, Irakli	2.07 m (6 ft 9 in)		35 – 25 April 1991

Head coach

- (Georgia (country)) Anatoli Berishvili

Assistant coach(es)

- (Georgia (country)) Nikoloz Tsintsadze

Legend

- (C) Team captain
- Injured
