= BC MIA Academy =

MIA Academy
- Leagues: Georgian Super Liga
- Founded: 2008
- Arena: Tbilisi Sports Palace
- Capacity: 10,00
- Location: Tbilisi, Georgia
- Team colors: Navy Blue and Red
- President: Levan Mikaberidze
- Head coach: Dragan Petričević
- Championships: 1 Georgian Championship; 1 Georgian Cup
Home	Away

BC MIA Academy (Georgian: საკალათბურთო კლუბი შსს აკადემია) is a professional basketball club based in Tbilisi, that plays in the Georgian Superliga. The club is affiliated to the Georgian Ministry of Internal Affairs, and plays its home games in the Tbilisi Sports Palace.

== History ==
BC MIA Academy was founded in 2008, intending to provide MIA employees with an opportunity to play basketball at a professional level. However, funding was gradually increased during the following seasons, allowing the club to acquire more experienced Georgian players, as well as foreign imports, and to set themselves more ambitious targets. Success failed to materialise initially, with the club failing to advance beyond the quarterfinal stage in the championship play-offs, or to win any other domestic tournaments until the 2012/2013 season. In that season, however, MIA Academy managed to win the domestic double of Georgian Superleague and the Georgian Cup. A reduction in funding led to the departure of foreign players, as well as the title-winning head coach Giorgos Ketselidis, with the club going into the following season with a young all-Georgian side.

== Current roster ==
BC MIA Academy roster
Players
Coaches

Pos.	No.	Nat.	Name	Ht.	Wt.	Age
PG	5	(Georgia (country))	Kitoshvili, Tornike	1.80 m (5 ft 11 in)
SG	6	(Georgia (country))	Chikviladze, Beka	1.96 m (6 ft 5 in)
PF	7	(Georgia (country))	Lapanashvili, Lekso	1.97 m (6 ft 6 in)
SG	8	(Georgia (country))	Bokolishvili, Merab	1.94 m (6 ft 4 in)
C	9	(Georgia (country))	Londaridze, Ilia (C)	2.05 m (6 ft 9 in)
PF	11	(Georgia (country))	Kvantaliani, Valeri	2.05 m (6 ft 9 in)
C	12	(Georgia (country))	Mirziashvili, Merab	2.08 m (6 ft 10 in)
SF	15	(Georgia (country))	Lolishvili, Levan	1.98 m (6 ft 6 in)
SF	20	(Georgia (country))	Lomouri, Akaki	1.98 m (6 ft 6 in)
C	22	(Georgia (country))	Ugrekhelidze, Davit	2.08 m (6 ft 10 in)
C	23	(Georgia (country))	Gelazonia, Shota	2.06 m (6 ft 9 in)
PG	30	(Georgia (country))	Rogava, Revaz	1.92 m (6 ft 4 in)
SF	33	(Georgia (country))	Tomaradze, Konstantine	1.98 m (6 ft 6 in)

Head coach

- (Bosnia and Herzegovina) Dragan Petričević

Assistant coach(es)

- (Georgia (country)) Archil Zhgenti

Legend

- (C) Team captain
- Injured
