= BC Rustavi =

Rustavi 1991
- Leagues: Georgian Superliga
- Founded: 1991; 35 years ago
- History: BC Azoti (1991–1995); BC Kimikosi (1995–1997); BC Azoti (1997–2005); BC Rustavi (2005–present)
- Arena: Azot Arena
- Capacity: 750
- Location: Rustavi, Georgia
- Team colors: black and white
- President: Giorgi Gogoberishvili
- Head coach: Goga Tsekvava
- Championships: 4 Georgian Superligas
- Website: http://basketball.energyinvest.ge/
Uniform	Uniform

BC Rustavi (Georgian: საკალათბურთო კლუბი რუსთავი) is a professional basketball club based in the city of Rustavi, Georgia. The club competes in the Georgian Superliga, and plays its home games in the Rustavi sports arena.

== History ==
The club was founded in 1991 as BC Azoti, and began competing in the newly established Georgian national league. It is one of only 2 clubs (the other being Dinamo Tbilisi) to have participated in the league continuously throughout its existence. Rustavi challenged for high positions in the league on a consistent basis, and recorded numerous top 3 finishes, always falling short of winning trophies.

The club's fortunes changed in 2006, when it acquired major sponsorship from the investment company 'Energy Invest'. They were now able to attract some of the best Georgian players to the club, as well as foreign imports. As a result, Rustavi convincingly won 4 league championships in a row, between 2007 and 2010. In addition, they won the Georgian cup in 2009, and numerous smaller national competitions. At the end of the 2009/10 season, 'Energy Invest' announced that the level of funding for the club would diminish, forcing them to compete with a young team and modest ambitions for 2 years. In 2012, the funding increased once more, and the squad was considerably strengthened.

Rustavi took part in various international competitions on several occasions, such as the Korać Cup in 1997, 98 and 99; the Eurocup in 2007; and the EuroChallenge in 2008, but failed to advance beyond the qualifying rounds on each occasion.

== Honours ==
- Georgian Superliga
  - Winner (5): 2007, 2008, 2009, 2010, 2021
  - Runner-up (4): 1998, 1999, 2000, 2006
- Georgian Cup
  - Winner (1): 2009
- Dadiani Memorial Trophy
  - Winner (5): 2006, 2007, 2008, 2009, 2010
- Korkia/Sakandelidze Memorial Trophy
  - Winner (5): 2006, 2007, 2008, 2010, 2020

== Players ==
=== Current roster ===
Note: Flags indicate national team eligibility at FIBA-sanctioned events. Players may hold other non-FIBA nationalities not displayed.

BC Rustavi roster
Players
Coaches

Pos.	No.	Nat.	Name
G	0	(Australia)	Nelson Larkins
PF	3	(United States Virgin Islands)	Jason Perry-Murray
C	6	(Georgia (country))	Gegi Baqradze
G	7	(Georgia (country))	Levan Tsekvava
G	8	(Georgia (country))	Merab Bokolishvili
G	11	(United States)	Denzel Livingston
SG	13	(Georgia (country))	Zurab Vashakidze
PF	21	(Georgia (country))	Akaki Dvalishvili

Head coach

(Georgia (country)) Anatoli Boisa

Assistant coach(es)

(Georgia (country)) Mikheil Beruashvili

Legend

- (C) Team captain
- Injured

- Roster
Updated: 7 August 2020

=== Notable players ===
To appear in this section a player must have either:
- Set a club record or won an individual award as a professional player.
- Played at least one official international match for his senior national team.

- (Georgia (country)) Rati Andronikashvili
- (Netherlands) Craig Osaikhwuwuomwan
