= BC Kutaisi 2010 =

- Leagues: Georgian Superliga
- Founded: 2010; 16 years ago
- Arena: Kutaisi Sport Palas
- Capacity: 1,550
- Location: Kutaisi, Georgia
- Team colors: Green and White
- Head coach: Kote Tugushi
Home	Away

BC Kutaisi 2010 is a Georgian professional basketball club based in Kutaisi, which competes in the Georgian Superliga.

== Honours ==
- Georgian Superliga
  - (gold) Champions (4): 2015-16, 2021-22, 2023-24, 2024–25
  - (silver) Silver medalists (4): 2013-14, 2016-17, 2017-18, 2018-19
  - (bronze) Bronze medalists (2): 2010-11, 2011–12
- Georgian Cup
  - (gold) Winners (5): 2013-14, 2016-17, 2017-18, 2020-21, 2024–25
  - (silver) Finalists (2): 2021-22, 2022–23
- Georgian Super Cup
  - (gold) Winners (4): 2014, 2018, 2021, 2024
  - (silver) Finalists (4): 2017, 2018, 2023, 2025
- D.Dadiani memorial
  - (gold) Winners (3): 2011, 2020, 2023
  - (silver) Finalists (4): 2015, 2016, 2021, 2025
- Z.Sakandelidze/M.Korkia memorial
  - (gold) Winners (6): 2016, 2017, 2018, 2021, 2022, 2026
  - (silver) Finalists (2): 2024, 2025
- G.Darbaidze memorial
  - (silver) Silver medalists (1): 2025

== Current roster ==
BC Kutaisi 2010 roster
Players
Coaches

Pos.	No.	Nat.	Name	Ht.	Wt.	Age
F	0	(Georgia (country))	Berekashvili, Baqar	2.03 m (6 ft 8 in)		21 – 13 December 2004
PG	1	(Georgia (country))	Kavtaradze, Dachi	1.91 m (6 ft 3 in)		24 – 28 November 2001
G	2	(United States)	Browning, Detrek	1.88 m (6 ft 2 in)		31 – 15 May 1995
F	3	(Georgia (country))	Soselia, Nikoloz	2.00 m (6 ft 7 in)		25 – 21 October 2001
G	4	(United States)	Boykin, Tyree	1.85 m (6 ft 1 in)		27 – 6 February 1999
PG	5	(Georgia (country))	Alavidze, Luka	1.96 m (6 ft 5 in)		21 – 5 May 2005
PG	6	(Georgia (country))	Tcheishvili, Gera	1.86 m (6 ft 1 in)		19 – 27 January 2007
G	8	(Georgia (country))	Dvalishvili, Temo	1.85 m (6 ft 1 in)		20 – 7 January 2006
PF	15	(Georgia (country))	Sulaberidze, Giorgi	1.92 m (6 ft 4 in)		22 – 24 February 2004
F	16	(Georgia (country))	Darbaidze, Nika	2.04 m (6 ft 8 in)		28 – 3 March 1998
F	24	(United States)	Gilson, Marqus	1.96 m (6 ft 5 in)		27 – 24 January 1999

Head coach

- (Georgia (country)) Kote Tugushi

Assistant coach(es)

- (Georgia (country)) Kakhaber Darakhvelidze
- (Georgia (country)) Shota Javakhishvili

Legend

- (C) Team captain
- Injured

== Domestic record ==
As of 13 November 2026

Competition	Season	Matches	W	L	GF	GA	+/-
Georgian Superliga	17	469	310	159	39120	36206	+2914
Georgian Cup	16	62	45	17	5271	4861	+410
Georgian Super Cup	9	9	4	5	721	718	+3
D.Dadiani memorial	15	48	32	16	4038	3612	+424
Z.Sakandelidze/M.Qorqia memorial	11	40	34	6	3594	3136	+458
G.Darbaidze memorial	1	2	1	1	154	167	-13

== European record and history ==
As of 19 April 2026

Competition	Season	Matches	W	L	GF	GA	+/-
Basketball Champions League	2	2	0	2	168	194	-26
FIBA Europe Cup	2	12	3	9	853	1124	-271
Total	4	14	3	11	1021	2442	-1421

Season	Competition	Round	Club	Home	Away	
2024–25	Basketball Champions League	QR1/4	(Slovakia) Patrioti Levice	87–111(neutral)		
2024–25	FIBA Europe Cup	GS	(Slovakia) Prievidza	104–108	69–77	3rd place
2024–25	FIBA Europe Cup	GS	(Spain) Surne Bilbao Basket	63–91	55–95	3rd place
2024–25	FIBA Europe Cup	GS	(Bulgaria) Balkan	93–92	86–78	3rd place
2025–26	Basketball Champions League	QR1/4	(Denmark) Bakken Bears	81–84(neutral)		
2025–26	FIBA Europe Cup	GS	(Czech Republic) PUMPA Basket Brno	66-84	80–73	4th place
2025–26	FIBA Europe Cup	GS	(Spain) Surne Bilbao Basket	62-113	54-117	4th place
2025–26	FIBA Europe Cup	GS	(Greece) Peristeri	53-101	67-102	4th place
