= BC Dinamo Tbilisi =

- Leagues: Georgian Super Liga
- Founded: 1934
- Arena: Tbilisi Sports Palace
- Capacity: 10,000
- Location: Tbilisi, Georgia
- Team colors: Blue, White
- President: Buba Kvimsadze
- Ownership: Zaza Pachulia; Shio Khetsuriani
- Championships: 1 EuroLeague; 6 Georgian Championships; 4 USSR Championships; 3 USSR Cups
- Website: bcdinamotbilisi.ge

BC Dinamo Tbilisi (Georgian: საკალათბურთო კლუბი "დინამო") is a professional basketball club that is based in Tbilisi, that plays in the Georgian Superliga. It is one of the oldest and most successful basketball clubs of Georgia and the former USSR, having won numerous national titles and the 1962 FIBA European Champions Cup (EuroLeague). The club's traditional colors are blue and white.

== History ==
BC Dinamo was established in 1934 as the basketball division of the Dynamo Sports Society. During the 1950s and the 1960s, it was one of the leading teams of the USSR. During this period, the club won the Soviet League championships 4 times, the Soviet Cup 3 times, and finished in medal positions (top 3) of the league championship a further 8 times.

In 1960, Dinamo reached the final of the FIBA European Champions Cup (the predecessor of the current EuroLeague), where they were defeated by Rīgas ASK in 2 games. Two years later, they once again reached the final of this competition, and on that occasion, they were crowned as Europe's best team by defeating Real Madrid in a one-off game in Geneva. The club's coach at that time was the legendary Otar Korkia, who had earlier starred for the club as a player, and was voted as one of FIBA's 50 Greatest Players in 1991. Dinamo also reached the final of the FIBA Saporta Cup (FIBA's second-tier level competition) in 1969, where they were defeated by Slavia VŠ Praha.

Dinamo became the very first winners of the independent Georgian championships in 1991. In total, they have won 4 Superliga titles and one Georgian cup. Failure to attract major sponsorship saw the club struggle for a long spell in the 2000s. However, Bank of Georgia became the club patrons in 2011, President of the club was former National team captain Vakhtang Natsvlishvili which allowed the squad to be strengthened with foreign imports, and more ambitious targets to be established for the future. The success finally materialized in the 2013–14 season, with Dinamo making their first appearance in the play-off finals for over a decade, and winning the title in a convincing manner.

In October 2018, two-time NBA champion Zaza Pachulia and former basketball player Shio Khetsuriani purchased the team.

== Honours ==
=== Domestic competitions ===
- USSR Premier League

Winners (4): 1949–50, 1952–53, 1953–54, 1967–68
Runners-up (4): 1947, 1960, 1961, 1969

- USSR Cup

Winners (3): 1949, 1950, 1969
Runners-up (2): 1953, 1973

- Georgian Superliga

Winners (6): 1990–91, 1991–92, 2002–03, 2013–14, 2016–17, 2017–18
Runners-up (6): 1995–96, 1996–97, 2001–02, 2003–04, 2014–15, 2015–16

- Georgian Cup

Winners (3): 2004, 2015, 2016

=== European competitions ===
- EuroLeague

Winners (1): 1961–1962
Runners-up (1): 1959–1960
Semi-finalists (1): 1962–1963

- FIBA Saporta Cup

Runners-up (1): 1968–69
Semi-finalists (1): 1969–70

== Current roster ==
BC Dinamo Tbilisi roster
Players
Coaches

Pos.	No.	Nat.	Name	Ht.	Wt.	Age
C	1	(Georgia (country))	Sharabidze, Giorgi	2.10 m (6 ft 11 in)	104 kg (229 lb)	34 – 27 April 1990
SG	3	(Serbia)	Crnić, Jovan	2.10 m (6 ft 11 in)		30 – 29 November 1994
PG	4	(United States)	Boyd, LaVell Lafrey	1.83 m (6 ft 0 in)	79 kg (174 lb)	30 – 28 June 1994
PG	6	(Georgia (country))	Grdzelidze, Levani	1.85 m (6 ft 1 in)		30 – 14 April 1994
SG	7	(United States)	Story, Malik	1.96 m (6 ft 5 in)	98 kg (216 lb)	35 – 2 February 1990
C	9	(Georgia (country))	Londaridze, Ilia	2.05 m (6 ft 9 in)	87 kg (192 lb)	35 – 15 September 1989
PF	10	(Georgia (country))	Machaladze, Zurab	1.98 m (6 ft 6 in)		32 – 15 August 1992
C	11	(United States)	Turpin, Kiel	2.13 m (7 ft 0 in)	109 kg (240 lb)	35 – 1 October 1989
SG	12	(Georgia (country))	Patsatsia, Levan	1.98 m (6 ft 6 in)	90 kg (198 lb)	36 – 27 September 1988
C	15	(Georgia (country))	Revazashvili, Giorgi	2.08 m (6 ft 10 in)		34 – 24 January 1991
PF	16	(Serbia)	Gaćeša, Nikola	2.06 m (6 ft 9 in)	104 kg (229 lb)	37 – 20 September 1987
PF	17	(Georgia (country))	Berishvili, Mikheil	2.03 m (6 ft 8 in)		37 – 12 April 1987
PG	21	(Georgia (country))	Gogodze, Nodar	1.92 m (6 ft 4 in)		30 – 12 July 1994

Head coach

- (North Macedonia) Muhhamed Tachi

Legend

- (C) Team captain
- Injured

== Head coaches ==
- (Soviet Union) / (Georgia (country)) Otar Korkia
- (North Macedonia) / (Kosovo) Muhamed Thaçi
