= Georgian Superliga =

- Founded: 1991; 35 years ago
- First season: 1990–91
- Country: Georgia
- Confederation: FIBA Europe
- Number of teams: 11
- Level on pyramid: 1
- Relegation to: Georgian A-Liga
- Current champions: Batumi (6th title) (2025–26)
- Most championships: Vita Tbilisi; Dinamo Tbilisi; Batumi (6 titles)
- Website: www.superleague.ge
- 2025–26 Georgian Superliga

The Georgian Basketball Super League (Georgian: საკალათბურთო სუპერლიგა, Sakalatburto Superliga), also known as the Georgian Top League, is the highest professional basketball league in Georgia. The first season was played in 1991, and was won by Dinamo Tbilisi. The 1990s were dominated by BC Vita Tbilisi, who won the title a record 7 times. BC Batumi, and then Energy Invest Rustavi, dominated the following decade. More recently, the league was dominated by clubs attached to State departments, with first BC Armia (Ministry of Defense) establishing themselves as the country's leading club, and later BC MIA Academy(Ministry of Internal Affairs) winning the title.

2013/14 was the first season when none of the country's universities were represented in the Superliga. This followed the decision by the Ministry of Education to withdraw funding from professional sports teams. That season saw Dinamo Tbilisi regain the title in a convincing manner, only to lose it the following year to a rejuvenated BC MIA Academy side.

The 2014/15 season saw the introduction of a second tier in Georgian basketball, called the A-League (A-Liga). Thus, for the first time, teams at the bottom of the Superliga were in danger of losing their top-tier status through relegation play-offs. It was then announced that from the 2015/16 season, the club finishing bottom of the Superliga will automatically get relegated to the A-Liga.

== 2024–25 teams ==
- Amra Gagra (previously Olimpi Tbilisi)
- Batumi
- Delta Gurjaani
- Iverioni Gori
- Kavkasia Tbilisi
- Kutaisi
- Margveti Tbilisi
- Orbi
- RASHI Tbilisi
- TSU Tbilisi
- Viktor Sanikidze Academy

== Champions ==
Season	Champions	Runners-up	Score
1990–91	Dinamo Tbilisi		
1991–92	Dinamo Tbilisi		
1992–93	BC Vita Tbilisi	Merani Tbilisi	2–0
1993–94	BC Vita Tbilisi	BC Tbilisi	2–1
1994–95	BC Vita Tbilisi	Kaktusi Tbilisi	2–1
1995–96	BC Vita Tbilisi	Dinamo Tbilisi	2–1
1996–97	BC Vita Tbilisi	Dinamo Tbilisi	2–0
1997–98	BC Vita Tbilisi		
1998–99	BASCO Batumi	Azoti Rustavi	3–1
1999–00	BASCO Batumi		
2000–01	BASCO Batumi	BC STU Tbilisi	2–0
2001–02	BASCO Batumi	Dinamo Tbilisi	3–0
2002–03	Dinamo Tbilisi	BASCO Batumi	3–2
2003–04	BASCO Batumi	Dinamo Tbilisi	3–2
2004–05	STU-Geocell Tbilisi	Aviamsheni Tbilisi	3–2
2005–06	Aviamsheni Tbilisi	Azoti Rustavi	3–2
2006–07	Azoti Rustavi	Aviamsheni Tbilisi	3–0
2007–08	Energy Invest Rustavi	Aviamsheni Tbilisi	3–1
2008–09	Energy Invest Rustavi	GSAU Tbilisi	3–0
2009–10	Energy Invest Rustavi	BC TSU Tbilisi	3–1
2010–11	BC Armia	BC TSU Tbilisi	3–1
2011–12	BC Armia	BC Olimpi Tbilisi	3–1
2012–13	BC MIA Academy	BC Olimpi Tbilisi	3–2
2013–14	Dinamo Tbilisi	Kutaisi	3–1
2014–15	BC MIA Academy	Dinamo Tbilisi	3–1
2015–16	Kutaisi	Dinamo Tbilisi	3–2
2016–17	Dinamo Tbilisi	Kutaisi	3–0
2017–18	Dinamo Tbilisi	Kutaisi	3–2
2018–19	Delta	Kutaisi	3–2
2019–20	Leader BC Batumi	Canceled due to COVID-19	
2020–21	Rustavi	Tskhum-Abkhazeti	3–0
2021–22	Kutaisi	BC Olimpi Tbilisi	3–0
2022–23	BC TSU Tbilisi	BC Rustavi	3–2
2023–24	Kutaisi	Kavkasia Tbilisi	3–1
2024–25	Kutaisi	BC TSU Tbilisi	3–2
2025–26	Batumi	BC TSU Tbilisi	3–1

== Number of titles ==
Team	Winner	Years
VITA Tbilisi	6	1993, 1994, 1995, 1996, 1997, 1998
Dinamo Tbilisi	6	1991, 1992, 2003, 2014, 2017, 2018
Batumi	6	1999, 2000, 2001, 2002, 2004, 2026
Rustavi	5	2007, 2008, 2009, 2010, 2021
Kutaisi 2010	4	2016, 2022, 2024, 2025
Mgzavrebi-Armia	2	2011, 2012
MIA Academy	2	2013, 2015
STU Tbilisi	1	2005
Tbilaviamshen Tbilisi	1	2006
Delta	1	2019
TSU Tbilisi	1	2023

=== All–time national champions ===
Total number of national champions won by Georgian clubs. Table includes titles won during the USSR Premier Basketball League (1923–1992).

Club	Trophies	Years won
Dinamo Tbilisi	10	1950, 1953, 1954, 1968, 1991, 1992, 2003, 2014, 2017, 2018
VITA Tbilisi	6	1993, 1994, 1995, 1996, 1997, 1998
BASCO Batumi	6	1999, 2000, 2001, 2002, 2004, 2026
Rustavi	5	2007, 2008, 2009, 2010, 2021
Mgzavrebi-Armia	4	1944, 1946, 2011, 2012
Kutaisi 2010	4	2016, 2022, 2024, 2025
MIA Academy	2	2013, 2015
STU Tbilisi	1	2005
Tbilaviamshen Tbilisi	1	2006
Delta	1	2019
TSU Tbilisi	1	2023

== Awards ==
=== Most Valuable Player ===
Year	Player	Position	Nationality	Team
2011–12	Ben Woodside	PG	United States	Armia
2012–13	Deonta Vaughn	PG	United States	MIA Academy
2013–14	Stevan Milošević	C	Montenegro	Dinamo Tbilisi
2014–15	Akaki Dvalishvili	PF	Georgia	Rustavi
2015–16	Nikola Gacesa	PF	Serbia	Rustavi
2016–17	Giorgi Tsintsadze	PG	Georgia	Kutaisi
2017–18	Adam Blazek	PG	United States	Rustavi
2018–19	Adrian Bowie	PG	United States	Mgzavrebi
2019–20	Collin Malcolm	F	United States	Batumi
2020–21	Mike Davis	G	United States	Rustavi
2021–22	Lovell Cabbil	PG	United States	TSU Tbilisi
2022–23	Djimon Henson	PG	United States	TSU Tbilisi
2023–24	Nikoloz Gaprindashvili	F	Georgia	Kavkasia Tbilisi
2024–25	Giorgi Korsantia	PF	Georgia	Kutaisi

=== Young Player of the Year ===
Year	Player	Position	Nationality	Team
2011–12	Duda Sanadze	SG	Georgia	Dinamo Tbilisi
2012–13	Revaz Rogava	SG	Georgia	MIA Academy
2017–18	Giorgi Turdziladze	C	Georgia	Cactus Tbilisi
2018–19	Nika Darbaidze and Giorgi Korsantia	F and PF	Georgia	Olimpi Tbilisi and TSU Hyundai
2019–20	Nikoloz Gaprindashvili	SF	Georgia	Dinamo Tbilisi
2020–21	Luka Maziashvili	G	Georgia	Vera
2021–22	Vladimer Tavakarashvili	PF	Georgia	Dinamo Tbilisi
2022–23	Nikoloz Gaprindashvili	F	Georgia	Kavkasia Tbilisi
2023–24	Giorgi Ochkhikidze	G	Georgia	Kutaisi 2010
