= EuroBasket 2013 squads =

This article displays the squads of the teams that competed in EuroBasket 2013. Each team consists of 12 players.

Age and club as of the start of the tournament, 4 September 2013.

== Group A ==
=== Belgium ===
Belgium men's national basketball team roster
Players
Coaches

Pos.	No.	Name	Age – Date of birth	Height	Club	Ctr.
G	4	Roel Moors	34 – 16 December 1978	1.86 m (6 ft 1 in)	Antwerp Giants	(Belgium)
G	5	Sam Van Rossom	27 – 3 June 1986	1.88 m (6 ft 2 in)	Valencia	(Spain)
F/C	6	Christophe Beghin	33 – 2 January 1980	2.06 m (6 ft 9 in)	Spirou Charleroi	(Belgium)
F	7	Axel Hervelle	30 – 12 May 1983	2.04 m (6 ft 8 in)	Bilbao Basket	(Spain)
F	8	Jean-Marc Mwema	23 – 5 December 1989	1.95 m (6 ft 5 in)	Antwerp Giants	(Belgium)
G	9	Jonathan Tabu	27 – 7 October 1985	1.84 m (6 ft 0 in)	Zaragoza	(Spain)
G	10	Quentin Serron	23 – 25 February 1990	1.90 m (6 ft 3 in)	Oostende	(Belgium)
G	11	Guy Muya	30 – 23 May 1983	1.90 m (6 ft 3 in)	Belfius Mons-Hainaut	(Belgium)
F	12	Wen Mukubu	30 – 2 August 1983	1.98 m (6 ft 6 in)	Spirou Charleroi	(Belgium)
F	13	Maxime De Zeeuw	26 – 26 April 1987	2.05 m (6 ft 9 in)	Antwerp Giants	(Belgium)
F/C	14	Sacha Massot	29 – 24 October 1983	2.08 m (6 ft 10 in)	Spirou Charleroi	(Belgium)
C	15	Yannick Driesen	24 – 2 November 1988	2.16 m (7 ft 1 in)	Antwerp Giants	(Belgium)

Head coach

- (Belgium) Eddy Casteels

Assistant coach(es)

- (Belgium) Pascal Angillis
- (Belgium) Jacques Stas

Legend

- (C) Team captain
- Club – describes last
  club before the tournament
- Age – describes age
  on 4 September 2013

=== France ===
France men's national basketball team roster
Players
Coaches

Pos.	No.	Name	Age – Date of birth	Height	Club	Ctr.
F/C	4	Joffrey Lauvergne	21 – 30 September 1991	2.03 m (6 ft 8 in)	Partizan Belgrade	(Serbia)
G/F	5	Nicolas Batum	24 – 14 December 1988	2.03 m (6 ft 8 in)	Portland Trail Blazers	(United States)
G	6	Antoine Diot	24 – 17 January 1989	1.90 m (6 ft 3 in)	Strasbourg IG	(France)
C	7	Johan Petro	27 – 27 January 1986	2.14 m (7 ft 0 in)	Zhejiang Guangsha	(China)
G/F	8	Charles Lombahe-Kahudi	27 – 19 July 1986	1.99 m (6 ft 6 in)	Le Mans	(France)
G	9	Tony Parker	31 – 17 May 1982	1.88 m (6 ft 2 in)	San Antonio Spurs	(United States)
G	10	Thomas Heurtel	24 – 10 April 1989	1.87 m (6 ft 2 in)	Saski Baskonia	(Spain)
F	11	Florent Piétrus	32 – 19 January 1981	2.01 m (6 ft 7 in)	SLUC Nancy	(France)
G	12	Nando de Colo	26 – 23 June 1987	1.95 m (6 ft 5 in)	San Antonio Spurs	(United States)
F	13	Boris Diaw	31 – 16 April 1982	2.05 m (6 ft 9 in)	San Antonio Spurs	(United States)
C	14	Alexis Ajinça	25 – 6 May 1988	2.15 m (7 ft 1 in)	Strasbourg IG	(France)
G/F	15	Mickaël Gelabale	30 – 22 May 1983	2.00 m (6 ft 7 in)	Khimki	(Russia)

Head coach

- (France) Vincent Collet

Assistant coach(es)

- (France) Jacques Commères
- (France) Ruddy Nelhomme

Legend

- (C) Team captain
- Club – describes last
  club before the tournament
- Age – describes age
  on 4 September 2013

=== Germany ===
Germany men's national basketball team roster
Players
Coaches

Pos.	No.	Name	Age – Date of birth	Height	Club	Ctr.
F	4	Alex King	28 – 20 February 1985	2.01 m (6 ft 7 in)	Alba Berlin	(Germany)
F	5	Niels Giffey	22 – 6 August 1991	2.00 m (6 ft 7 in)	Connecticut Huskies	(United States)
G	6	Per Günther	25 – 5 February 1988	1.84 m (6 ft 0 in)	ratiopharm Ulm	(Germany)
F	7	Philip Zwiener	28 – 23 July 1985	2.01 m (6 ft 7 in)	Eisbären Bremerhaven	(Germany)
G	8	Heiko Schaffartzik	29 – 3 January 1984	1.83 m (6 ft 0 in)	Bayern Munich	(Germany)
G	9	Karsten Tadda	24 – 2 November 1988	1.90 m (6 ft 3 in)	Brose Baskets	(Germany)
G	10	Lucca Staiger	25 – 14 June 1988	1.95 m (6 ft 5 in)	Bayern Munich	(Germany)
C	11	Tibor Pleiß	23 – 2 November 1989	2.15 m (7 ft 1 in)	Saski Baskonia	(Spain)
F	12	Robin Benzing	24 – 25 January 1989	2.08 m (6 ft 10 in)	Bayern Munich	(Germany)
G	13	Bastian Doreth	24 – 8 June 1989	1.83 m (6 ft 0 in)	Artland Dragons	(Germany)
C	14	Andreas Seiferth	24 – 23 June 1989	2.06 m (6 ft 9 in)	TBB Trier	(Germany)
C	15	Maik Zirbes	23 – 29 January 1990	2.07 m (6 ft 9 in)	Brose Baskets	(Germany)

Head coach

- (Germany) Frank Menz

Assistant coach(es)

- (Germany) Mladen Drijencic
- (Germany) Harald Stein
- (Germany) Helmut Wolf

Legend

- (C) Team captain
- Club – describes last
  club before the tournament
- Age – describes age
  on 4 September 2013

=== Great Britain ===
Great Britain men's national basketball team roster
Players
Coaches

Pos.	No.	Name	Age – Date of birth	Height	Club	Ctr.
F	4	Kieron Achara	30 – 3 July 1983	2.08 m (6 ft 10 in)	Kavala	(Greece)
G	5	Andrew Lawrence	23 – 4 June 1990	1.88 m (6 ft 2 in)	Charleston Cougars	(United States)
G	6	Justin Robinson	25 – 17 October 1987	1.88 m (6 ft 2 in)	Uppsala	(Sweden)
G	7	Devon Van Oostrum	20 – 24 January 1993	1.93 m (6 ft 4 in)	Saski Baskonia	(Spain)
F	8	Andrew Sullivan	33 – 12 February 1980	2.03 m (6 ft 8 in)	Leicester Riders	(England)
F	9	Gareth Murray	28 – 23 September 1984	2.01 m (6 ft 7 in)	Glasgow Rocks	(Scotland)
F	10	Myles Hesson	23 – 5 June 1990	1.95 m (6 ft 5 in)	Gießen 46ers	(Germany)
C	11	Alasdair Fraser	21 – 13 August 1992	2.01 m (6 ft 7 in)	Maine Black Bears	(United States)
F	12	Daniel Clark	24 – 16 September 1988	2.08 m (6 ft 10 in)	Zaragoza	(Spain)
G	13	Ogooluwa Adegboye	25 – 23 September 1987	1.82 m (6 ft 0 in)	Engomis	(Cyprus)
C	14	Eric Boateng	27 – 20 November 1985	2.08 m (6 ft 10 in)	Phantoms Braunschweig	(Germany)
G	15	Kyle Johnson	24 – 31 December 1988	1.95 m (6 ft 5 in)	Sutor Montegranaro	(Italy)

Head coach

- (United States) Joe Prunty

Assistant coach(es)

- (Israel) Guy Goodes
- (United Kingdom) Nate Reinking
- (United States) Kenny Graves

Legend

- (C) Team captain
- Club – describes last
  club before the tournament
- Age – describes age
  on 4 September 2013

=== Israel ===
Israel men's national basketball team roster
Players
Coaches

Pos.	No.	Name	Age – Date of birth	Height	Club	Ctr.
G	4	Raviv Limonad	29 – 26 August 1984	1.91 m (6 ft 3 in)	Hapoel Tel Aviv	(Israel)
G	5	Afik Nissim	32 – 31 January 1981	1.86 m (6 ft 1 in)	Hapoel Eilat	(Israel)
G/F	6	Nitzan Hanochi	27 – 10 June 1986	1.90 m (6 ft 3 in)	Hapoel Eilat	(Israel)
F	7	Alex Tyus	25 – 8 January 1988	2.03 m (6 ft 8 in)	Maccabi Tel Aviv	(Israel)
F	8	Lior Eliyahu	27 – 9 September 1985	2.07 m (6 ft 9 in)	Hapoel Jerusalem	(Israel)
F	9	Omri Casspi	25 – 22 June 1988	2.06 m (6 ft 9 in)	Houston Rockets	(United States)
F	10	Guy Pnini	30 – 4 September 1983	2.01 m (6 ft 7 in)	Maccabi Tel Aviv	(Israel)
G	11	Yogev Ohayon	26 – 24 April 1987	1.89 m (6 ft 2 in)	Maccabi Tel Aviv	(Israel)
G	12	Yotam Halperin	29 – 24 January 1984	1.96 m (6 ft 5 in)	Hapoel Jerusalem	(Israel)
C	13	Ido Kozikaro	35 – 8 January 1978	2.02 m (6 ft 8 in)	Maccabi Haifa	(Israel)
C	14	Yaniv Green	33 – 16 May 1980	2.06 m (6 ft 9 in)	Hapoel Jerusalem	(Israel)
F	15	Elishay Kadir	25 – 4 November 1987	2.03 m (6 ft 8 in)	Hapoel Jerusalem	(Israel)

Head coach

- (Israel) Arik Shivek

Assistant coach(es)

- (Israel) Eric Elfasi
- (Israel) Oded Kattash

Legend

- (C) Team captain
- Club – describes last
  club before the tournament
- Age – describes age
  on 4 September 2013

=== Ukraine ===
Ukraine men's national basketball team roster
Players
Coaches

Pos.	No.	Name	Age – Date of birth	Height	Club	Ctr.
F	4	Maksym Pustozvonov	26 – 16 April 1987	2.00 m (6 ft 7 in)	Azovmash	(Ukraine)
G	5	Eugene Jeter	29 – 2 December 1983	1.80 m (5 ft 11 in)	Shandong Lions	(China)
G	6	Olexandr Mishula	21 – 18 April 1992	1.89 m (6 ft 2 in)	Dnipro	(Ukraine)
F	7	Dmytro Gliebov	25 – 20 July 1988	1.99 m (6 ft 6 in)	Donetsk	(Ukraine)
G	8	Sergiy Gladyr	24 – 17 October 1988	1.97 m (6 ft 6 in)	Nanterre	(France)
G	9	Oleksandr Lypovyy	21 – 9 October 1991	2.01 m (6 ft 7 in)	Donetsk	(Ukraine)
C	10	Kyryl Natyazhko	22 – 30 November 1990	2.05 m (6 ft 9 in)	Azovmash	(Ukraine)
G	11	Dmytro Zabirchenko	29 – 15 June 1984	1.88 m (6 ft 2 in)	Azovmash	(Ukraine)
F	12	Maxym Korniyenko	26 – 26 June 1987	2.04 m (6 ft 8 in)	Donetsk	(Ukraine)
C	13	Ihor Zaytsev	24 – 11 May 1989	2.07 m (6 ft 9 in)	Azovmash	(Ukraine)
C	14	Artem Pustovyi	21 – 25 June 1992	2.18 m (7 ft 2 in)	BC Khimik	(Ukraine)
C	15	Viacheslav Kravtsov	26 – 25 August 1987	2.12 m (6 ft 11 in)	Phoenix Suns	(United States)

Head coach

- (United States) Mike Fratello

Assistant coach(es)

- (United States) Bob Hill

Legend

- (C) Team captain
- Club – describes last
  club before the tournament
- Age – describes age
  on 4 September 2013

== Group B ==
=== Bosnia and Herzegovina ===
Bosnia and Herzegovina men's national basketball team roster
Players
Coaches

Pos.	No.	Name	Age – Date of birth	Height	Club	Ctr.
G	4	Muhamed Pašalić	26 – 27 August 1987	1.85 m (6 ft 1 in)	Aris Thessaloniki	(Greece)
G	5	Ante Mašić	27 – 28 October 1985	1.95 m (6 ft 5 in)	Cedevita Zagreb	(Croatia)
C	6	Andrija Stipanović	26 – 18 December 1986	2.08 m (6 ft 10 in)	Oostende	(Belgium)
G	7	Marko Šutalo	30 – 13 April 1983	1.95 m (6 ft 5 in)	Široki	(Bosnia and Herzegovina)
G	8	Zackary Wright	28 – 5 February 1985	1.95 m (6 ft 5 in)	Brose Baskets	(Germany)
F	9	Edin Bavčić	29 – 6 May 1984	2.05 m (6 ft 9 in)	KAOD	(Greece)
G	10	Nemanja Gordić	24 – 25 September 1988	1.85 m (6 ft 1 in)	Partizan Belgrade	(Serbia)
C	11	Elmedin Kikanović	25 – 2 September 1988	2.10 m (6 ft 11 in)	Enisey Krasnoyarsk	(Russia)
F	12	Mirza Teletović	27 – 17 September 1985	2.06 m (6 ft 9 in)	Brooklyn Nets	(United States)
F	13	Dalibor Peršić	28 – 28 August 1985	1.95 m (6 ft 5 in)	Široki	(Bosnia and Herzegovina)
F	14	Nihad Đedović	23 – 12 January 1990	1.95 m (6 ft 5 in)	Bayern Munich	(Germany)
C	15	Nedžad Sinanović	30 – 29 January 1983	2.20 m (7 ft 3 in)	Valladolid	(Spain)

Head coach

- (Croatia) Aleksandar Petrović

Assistant coach(es)

- (Croatia) Denis Bajramović

Legend

- (C) Team captain
- Club – describes last
  club before the tournament
- Age – describes age
  on 4 September 2013

=== Latvia ===
Latvia men's national basketball team roster
Players
Coaches

Pos.	No.	Name	Age – Date of birth	Height	Club	Ctr.
C	4	Mārtiņš Meiers	22 – 30 March 1991	2.06 m (6 ft 9 in)	BK Ventspils	(Latvia)
F	5	Mareks Mejeris	22 – 2 September 1991	2.07 m (6 ft 9 in)	Knet	(Spain)
F	6	Rolands Freimanis	25 – 21 January 1988	2.10 m (6 ft 11 in)	Sutor Montegranaro	(Italy)
G	7	Jānis Blūms	31 – 20 April 1982	1.88 m (6 ft 2 in)	Lietuvos rytas	(Lithuania)
F	8	Jānis Bērziņš	20 – 4 May 1993	2.01 m (6 ft 7 in)	BK Valmiera	(Latvia)
G	9	Dairis Bertāns	23 – 9 September 1989	1.92 m (6 ft 4 in)	VEF Rīga	(Latvia)
G	10	Rihards Kuksiks	25 – 17 July 1988	2.01 m (6 ft 7 in)	Budivelnyk Kyiv	(Ukraine)
G	11	Armands Šķēle	30 – 4 September 1983	1.92 m (6 ft 4 in)	Kalev/Cramo	(Estonia)
G	12	Kristaps Janičenoks	30 – 14 March 1983	1.95 m (6 ft 5 in)	VEF Rīga	(Latvia)
G	13	Jānis Strēlnieks	24 – 1 September 1989	1.91 m (6 ft 3 in)	Spartak	(Russia)
F/C	14	Kaspars Bērziņš	28 – 25 August 1985	2.11 m (6 ft 11 in)	VEF Rīga	(Latvia)
C	15	Andrejs Šeļakovs	24 – 8 November 1988	2.07 m (6 ft 9 in)	Melilla	(Spain)

Head coach

- (Latvia) Ainars Bagatskis

Assistant coach(es)

- (Latvia) Arturs Štālbergs

Legend

- (C) Team captain
- Club – describes last
  club before the tournament
- Age – describes age
  on 4 September 2013

=== Lithuania ===
Lithuania men's national basketball team roster
Players
Coaches

Pos.	No.	Name	Age – Date of birth	Height	Club	Ctr.
F/C	4	Donatas Motiejūnas	22 – 20 September 1990	2.13 m (7 ft 0 in)	Houston Rockets	(United States)
G	5	Mantas Kalnietis	26 – 6 September 1986	1.96 m (6 ft 5 in)	Lokomotiv-Kuban	(Russia)
F	6	Mindaugas Kuzminskas	23 – 19 October 1989	2.06 m (6 ft 9 in)	Málaga	(Spain)
C	7	Darjuš Lavrinovič	33 – 1 November 1979	2.12 m (6 ft 11 in)	Budivelnyk Kyiv	(Ukraine)
F	8	Jonas Mačiulis	28 – 10 February 1985	1.98 m (6 ft 6 in)	Panathinaikos	(Greece)
G	9	Tomas Delininkaitis	31 – 11 June 1982	1.90 m (6 ft 3 in)	Cherkaski Mavpy	(Ukraine)
G	10	Renaldas Seibutis	28 – 23 July 1985	1.98 m (6 ft 6 in)	Lietuvos Rytas	(Lithuania)
F	11	Linas Kleiza	28 – 3 January 1985	2.03 m (6 ft 8 in)	Fenerbahçe	(Turkey)
F/C	12	Kšyštof Lavrinovič	33 – 1 November 1979	2.10 m (6 ft 11 in)	Žalgiris Kaunas	(Lithuania)
G/F	13	Martynas Pocius	27 – 28 April 1986	1.96 m (6 ft 5 in)	Žalgiris Kaunas	(Lithuania)
C	14	Jonas Valančiūnas	21 – 6 May 1992	2.11 m (6 ft 11 in)	Toronto Raptors	(Canada)
C	15	Robertas Javtokas	33 – 20 March 1980	2.11 m (6 ft 11 in)	Žalgiris Kaunas	(Lithuania)

Head coach

- (Lithuania) Jonas Kazlauskas

Assistant coach(es)

- (Lithuania) Darius Maskoliūnas
- (Lithuania) Gintaras Krapikas

Legend

- (C) Team captain
- Club – describes last
  club before the tournament
- Age – describes age
  on 4 September 2013

=== Macedonia ===
Macedonia men's national basketball team roster
Players
Coaches

Pos.	No.	Name	Age – Date of birth	Height	Club	Ctr.
G	4	Aleksandar Kostoski	25 – 5 March 1988	1.88 m (6 ft 2 in)	KK Kumanovo	(North Macedonia)
G	5	Vlado Ilievski	33 – 19 January 1980	1.90 m (6 ft 3 in)	Cedevita Zagreb	(Croatia)
G	6	Darko Sokolov	27 – 8 May 1986	1.90 m (6 ft 3 in)	Feni Industries	(North Macedonia)
G	7	Bo McCalebb	28 – 4 May 1985	1.83 m (6 ft 0 in)	Fenerbahçe	(Turkey)
F	8	Vojdan Stojanovski	25 – 9 December 1987	1.97 m (6 ft 6 in)	BC Donetsk	(Ukraine)
G	9	Damjan Stojanovski	25 – 9 December 1987	1.97 m (6 ft 6 in)	MZT Skopje	(North Macedonia)
F	10	Vladimir Brčkov	23 – 29 December 1989	1.97 m (6 ft 6 in)	Feni Industries	(North Macedonia)
C	11	Todor Gečevski	36 – 28 August 1977	2.09 m (6 ft 10 in)	MZT Skopje	(North Macedonia)
F	12	Pero Antić (C)	31 – 29 July 1982	2.10 m (6 ft 11 in)	Atlanta Hawks	(United States)
F	13	Stojan Gjuroski	21 – 6 November 1991	2.03 m (6 ft 8 in)	Louisiana Tech Bulldogs	(United States)
F	14	Gjorgji Čekovski	33 – 11 December 1979	2.03 m (6 ft 8 in)	MZT Skopje	(North Macedonia)
C	15	Predrag Samardžiski	27 – 11 April 1986	2.15 m (7 ft 1 in)	Red Star Belgrade	(Serbia)

Head coach

- (Slovenia) Aleš Pipan

Assistant coach(es)

- (North Macedonia) Marjan Srbinovski
- (North Macedonia) Aleksandar Jončevski

Legend

- (C) Team captain
- Club – describes last
  club before the tournament
- Age – describes age
  on 4 September 2013

=== Montenegro ===
Montenegro men's national basketball team roster
Players
Coaches

Pos.	No.	Name	Age – Date of birth	Height	Club	Ctr.
C	4	Nikola Vučević	22 – 24 October 1990	2.13 m (7 ft 0 in)	Orlando Magic	(United States)
G	5	Bojan Bakić	30 – 8 January 1983	1.97 m (6 ft 6 in)	Metalac Valjevo	(Serbia)
G	6	Suad Šehović	26 – 19 February 1987	1.96 m (6 ft 5 in)	Budućnost Podgorica	(Montenegro)
F	7	Aleksa Popović	26 – 31 July 1987	2.00 m (6 ft 7 in)	Budućnost Podgorica	(Montenegro)
G	8	Sead Šehović	25 – 22 August 1988	1.96 m (6 ft 5 in)	Szolnoki Olaj	(Hungary)
C	9	Blagota Sekulić	31 – 14 March 1982	2.09 m (6 ft 10 in)	1939 Canarias	(Spain)
G	10	Nikola Ivanović	19 – 19 February 1994	1.90 m (6 ft 3 in)	Budućnost Podgorica	(Montenegro)
C	11	Milko Bjelica	29 – 4 June 1984	2.05 m (6 ft 9 in)	Saski Baskonia	(Spain)
G	12	Tyrese Rice	26 – 15 May 1987	1.85 m (6 ft 1 in)	Maccabi Tel Aviv	(Israel)
G	13	Marko Popović	27 – 10 October 1985	1.99 m (6 ft 6 in)	Budućnost Podgorica	(Montenegro)
C	14	Bojan Dubljević	21 – 24 October 1991	2.05 m (6 ft 9 in)	Valencia	(Spain)
F	15	Vladimir Dašić	25 – 13 May 1988	2.08 m (6 ft 10 in)	KK Metalac Valjevo	(Serbia)

Head coach

- (Montenegro) Luka Pavićević

Assistant coach(es)

- (Montenegro) Stojan Ivković
- (Montenegro) Igor Jovović
- (Montenegro) Petar Mijović

Legend

- (C) Team captain
- Club – describes last
  club before the tournament
- Age – describes age
  on 4 September 2013

=== Serbia ===
Serbia men's national basketball team roster
Players
Coaches

Pos.	No.	Name	Age – Date of birth	Height	Club	Ctr.
G	4	Nemanja Nedović	22 – 16 June 1991	1.91 m (6 ft 3 in)	Golden State Warriors	(United States)
G/F	5	Nemanja Krstić	20 – 2 March 1993	2.05 m (6 ft 9 in)	Mega Vizura	(Serbia)
G	6	Vasilije Micić	19 – 13 January 1994	1.96 m (6 ft 5 in)	Mega Vizura	(Serbia)
G/F	7	Bogdan Bogdanović	21 – 18 August 1992	1.98 m (6 ft 6 in)	Partizan Belgrade	(Serbia)
F	8	Nemanja Bjelica	25 – 9 May 1988	2.09 m (6 ft 10 in)	Fenerbahçe	(Turkey)
G	9	Stefan Marković	25 – 25 April 1988	1.99 m (6 ft 6 in)	Valencia	(Spain)
F	10	Nikola Kalinić	21 – 8 November 1991	2.02 m (6 ft 8 in)	Radnički Kragujevac	(Serbia)
C	11	Đorđe Gagić	22 – 28 December 1990	2.10 m (6 ft 11 in)	Partizan Belgrade	(Serbia)
C	12	Nenad Krstić	30 – 25 July 1983	2.14 m (7 ft 0 in)	CSKA Moscow	(Russia)
G	13	Danilo Anđušić	22 – 22 April 1991	1.95 m (6 ft 5 in)	Virtus Bologna	(Italy)
C	14	Raško Katić	32 – 8 December 1980	2.08 m (6 ft 10 in)	Red Star Belgrade	(Serbia)
C	15	Vladimir Štimac	26 – 25 August 1987	2.08 m (6 ft 10 in)	Unicaja Malaga	(Spain)

Head coach

- (Serbia) Dušan Ivković

Assistant coach(es)

- (Serbia) Đorđe Adžić
- (Serbia) Miloš Gligorijević
- (Serbia) Aleksandar Kesar

Legend

- (C) Team captain
- Club – describes last
  club before the tournament
- Age – describes age
  on 4 September 2013

== Group C ==
=== Croatia ===
Croatia men's national basketball team roster
Players
Coaches

Pos.	No.	Name	Age – Date of birth	Height	Club	Ctr.
C	4	Ante Tomić	26 – 17 February 1987	2.18 m (7 ft 2 in)	FC Barcelona	(Spain)
C	5	Lukša Andrić	28 – 19 January 1985	2.10 m (6 ft 11 in)	Türk Telekom	(Turkey)
G	6	Dontaye Draper	29 – 16 August 1984	1.80 m (5 ft 11 in)	Real Madrid	(Spain)
G/F	7	Bojan Bogdanović	24 – 18 April 1989	2.02 m (6 ft 8 in)	Fenerbahçe	(Turkey)
F	8	Dario Šarić	19 – 8 April 1994	2.08 m (6 ft 10 in)	Cibona Zagreb	(Croatia)
F	9	Damjan Rudež	27 – 17 June 1986	2.08 m (6 ft 10 in)	Zaragoza	(Spain)
G	10	Roko Ukić	28 – 5 December 1984	1.96 m (6 ft 5 in)	Panathinaikos	(Greece)
G	11	Krunoslav Simon	28 – 24 June 1985	1.97 m (6 ft 6 in)	Lokomotiv-Kuban	(Russia)
F	12	Damir Markota	27 – 26 December 1985	2.09 m (6 ft 10 in)	Free agent
F	13	Mario Delaš	23 – 16 January 1990	2.07 m (6 ft 9 in)	Obradoiro CAB	(Spain)
C	14	Luka Žorić	28 – 5 November 1984	2.10 m (6 ft 11 in)	Fenerbahçe Ülker	(Turkey)
G	15	Ante Delaš	25 – 11 March 1988	2.00 m (6 ft 7 in)	Cedevita Zagreb	(Croatia)

Head coach

- (Croatia) Jasmin Repeša

Assistant coach(es)

- (Croatia) Mladen Erjavec
- (Croatia) Ivan Sunara
- (Croatia) Luka Milanović

Legend

- (C) Team captain
- Club – describes last
  club before the tournament
- Age – describes age
  on 4 September 2013

=== Czech Republic ===
Czech Republic men's national basketball team roster
Players
Coaches

Pos.	No.	Name	Age – Date of birth	Height	Club	Ctr.
C	4	Petr Benda	31 – 25 March 1982	2.03 m (6 ft 8 in)	ČEZ Basketball Nymburk	(Czech Republic)
C	5	Ondřej Balvín	20 – 20 September 1992	2.16 m (7 ft 1 in)	CB Sevilla	(Spain)
F	6	Pavel Pumprla	27 – 13 June 1986	2.00 m (6 ft 7 in)	Obradoiro CAB	(Spain)
F	7	Vojtěch Hruban	24 – 29 August 1989	2.02 m (6 ft 8 in)	ČEZ Basketball Nymburk	(Czech Republic)
G	8	Tomáš Satoranský	21 – 30 October 1991	2.00 m (6 ft 7 in)	CB Sevilla	(Spain)
G/F	9	Jiří Welsch	33 – 27 January 1980	2.01 m (6 ft 7 in)	ČEZ Basketball Nymburk	(Czech Republic)
C	10	Pavel Houška	29 – 23 January 1984	2.03 m (6 ft 8 in)	ČEZ Basketball Nymburk	(Czech Republic)
F/C	11	Luboš Bartoň	33 – 7 April 1980	2.02 m (6 ft 8 in)	Phantoms Braunschweig	(Germany)
F	12	David Jelínek	22 – 7 September 1990	1.96 m (6 ft 5 in)	Saski Baskonia	(Spain)
G	13	Jakub Kudláček	23 – 3 March 1990	1.93 m (6 ft 4 in)	Pallacanestro Cantù	(Italy)
C	14	Kamil Švrdlík	26 – 25 November 1986	2.05 m (6 ft 9 in)	BK Prostějov	(Czech Republic)
F/C	15	Jan Veselý	23 – 24 April 1990	2.11 m (6 ft 11 in)	Washington Wizards	(United States)

Head coach

- (Czech Republic) Pavel Budínský

Assistant coach(es)

- (United States) Mike Taylor

Legend

- (C) Team captain
- Club – describes last
  club before the tournament
- Age – describes age
  on 4 September 2013

=== Georgia ===
Georgia men's national basketball team roster
Players
Coaches

Pos.	No.	Name	Age – Date of birth	Height	Club	Ctr.
F	4	Nika Metreveli	22 – 14 January 1991	2.11 m (6 ft 11 in)	Free agent
G	5	Otar Pkhakadze	20 – 28 February 1993	1.90 m (6 ft 3 in)	Fairmont State Falcons	(United States)
F	6	Duda Sanadze	21 – 25 July 1992	1.96 m (6 ft 5 in)	San Diego Toreros	(United States)
F	7	Beka Burjanadze	19 – 3 January 1994	2.03 m (6 ft 8 in)	Sevilla	(Spain)
G	8	Giorgi Tsintsadze	27 – 7 February 1986	1.92 m (6 ft 4 in)	Free agent
C	9	Giorgi Shermadini	24 – 2 April 1989	2.16 m (7 ft 1 in)	Zaragoza	(Spain)
G	10	Ricky Hickman	28 – 1 September 1985	1.89 m (6 ft 2 in)	Maccabi Tel Aviv	(Israel)
F	11	Manuchar Markoishvili	26 – 17 November 1986	1.96 m (6 ft 5 in)	Galatasaray	(Turkey)
F	12	Levan Patsatsia	24 – 24 September 1988	1.98 m (6 ft 6 in)	BC Dnipro	(Ukraine)
F	13	Viktor Sanikidze	27 – 1 April 1986	2.03 m (6 ft 8 in)	Free agent
G	14	Besik Lezhava	27 – 21 February 1986	1.92 m (6 ft 4 in)	BC Kutaisi 2010	(Georgia (country))
F	15	Nikoloz Tskitishvili	30 – 14 April 1983	2.12 m (6 ft 11 in)	Free agent

Head coach

- (Serbia) Igor Kokoskov

Assistant coach(es)

- (Georgia (country)) Jason Staudt
- (Georgia (country)) Kote Tugushi

Legend

- (C) Team captain
- Club – describes last
  club before the tournament
- Age – describes age
  on 4 September 2013

=== Poland ===
Poland men's national basketball team roster
Players
Coaches

Pos.	No.	Name	Age – Date of birth	Height	Club	Ctr.
C	4	Przemysław Karnowski	19 – 8 November 1993	2.15 m (7 ft 1 in)	Gonzaga Bulldogs	(United States)
F	5	Thomas Kelati	30 – 27 September 1982	1.95 m (6 ft 5 in)	Trabzonspor	(Turkey)
F	6	Maciej Lampe	28 – 5 February 1985	2.11 m (6 ft 11 in)	FC Barcelona	(Spain)
G	7	Krzysztof Szubarga	29 – 5 July 1984	1.78 m (5 ft 10 in)	Anwil Włocławek	(Poland)
G	8	Michał Chyliński	27 – 22 February 1986	1.96 m (6 ft 5 in)	Turów Zgorzelec	(Poland)
F	9	Przemysław Zamojski	26 – 16 December 1986	1.93 m (6 ft 4 in)	Asseco Prokom Gdynia	(Poland)
F	10	Mateusz Ponitka	20 – 29 August 1993	1.96 m (6 ft 5 in)	Asseco Prokom Gdynia	(Poland)
F	11	Michał Ignerski	33 – 13 August 1980	2.07 m (6 ft 9 in)	Dinamo Sassari	(Italy)
G	12	Adam Waczyński	23 – 15 October 1989	1.99 m (6 ft 6 in)	Trefl Sopot	(Poland)
C	13	Marcin Gortat	29 – 17 February 1984	2.11 m (6 ft 11 in)	Phoenix Suns	(United States)
C	14	Adam Hrycaniuk	29 – 15 March 1984	2.06 m (6 ft 9 in)	Valencia	(Spain)
G	15	Łukasz Koszarek	29 – 12 January 1984	1.87 m (6 ft 2 in)	Zielona Góra	(Poland)

Head coach

- (Germany) Dirk Bauermann

Assistant coach(es)

- (Poland) Artur Gronek
- (Poland) Krzysztof Szablowski

Legend

- (C) Team captain
- Club – describes last
  club before the tournament
- Age – describes age
  on 4 September 2013

=== Slovenia ===
Slovenia men's national basketball team roster
Players
Coaches

Pos.	No.	Name	Age – Date of birth	Height	Club	Ctr.
F	4	Uroš Slokar	30 – 14 May 1983	2.10 m (6 ft 11 in)	Free Agent
G	5	Jaka Lakovič	35 – 9 July 1978	1.86 m (6 ft 1 in)	Sidigas Avellino	(Italy)
F	6	Jure Balažič	32 – 12 September 1980	2.04 m (6 ft 8 in)	Tofaş	(Turkey)
G	7	Nebojša Joksimović	31 – 17 November 1981	1.93 m (6 ft 4 in)	Union Olimpija	(Slovenia)
F	8	Edo Murić	21 – 27 November 1991	2.01 m (6 ft 7 in)	Krka	(Slovenia)
G	9	Jaka Blažič	23 – 30 June 1990	1.96 m (6 ft 5 in)	Red Star Belgrade	(Serbia)
F	10	Boštjan Nachbar	33 – 3 July 1980	2.06 m (6 ft 9 in)	FC Barcelona	(Spain)
G	11	Goran Dragić	27 – 6 May 1986	1.94 m (6 ft 4 in)	Phoenix Suns	(United States)
G	12	Zoran Dragić	24 – 22 June 1989	1.96 m (6 ft 5 in)	Málaga	(Spain)
G	13	Domen Lorbek	28 – 6 March 1985	1.98 m (6 ft 6 in)	Free Agent
C	14	Gašper Vidmar	25 – 14 September 1987	2.10 m (6 ft 11 in)	Fenerbahçe	(Turkey)
C	15	Mirza Begić	28 – 9 July 1985	2.16 m (7 ft 1 in)	Olympiacos	(Greece)

Head coach

- (Serbia) Božidar Maljković

Assistant coach(es)

- (Slovenia) Gašper Potočnik
- (Slovenia) Aleksander Sekulič

Legend

- (C) Team captain
- Club – describes last
  club before the tournament
- Age – describes age
  on 4 September 2013

=== Spain ===
Spain men's national basketball team roster
Players
Coaches

Pos.	No.	Name	Age – Date of birth	Height	Club	Ctr.
F	4	Pablo Aguilar	24 – 9 February 1989	2.05 m (6 ft 9 in)	Valencia	(Spain)
G/F	5	Rudy Fernández	28 – 4 April 1985	1.98 m (6 ft 6 in)	Real Madrid	(Spain)
G	6	Sergio Rodríguez	27 – 12 June 1986	1.92 m (6 ft 4 in)	Real Madrid	(Spain)
C	7	Xavi Rey	26 – 13 July 1987	2.10 m (6 ft 11 in)	Gran Canaria	(Spain)
G	8	José Calderón	31 – 28 September 1981	1.92 m (6 ft 4 in)	Dallas Mavericks	(United States)
G	9	Ricky Rubio	22 – 21 October 1990	1.93 m (6 ft 4 in)	Minnesota Timberwolves	(United States)
F	10	Víctor Claver	25 – 30 August 1988	2.07 m (6 ft 9 in)	Portland Trail Blazers	(United States)
F	11	Fernando San Emeterio	29 – 1 January 1984	1.99 m (6 ft 6 in)	Saski Baskonia	(Spain)
G	12	Sergio Llull	25 – 15 November 1987	1.92 m (6 ft 4 in)	Real Madrid	(Spain)
C	13	Marc Gasol	28 – 29 January 1985	2.16 m (7 ft 1 in)	Memphis Grizzlies	(United States)
C	14	Germán Gabriel	32 – 16 November 1980	2.07 m (6 ft 9 in)	Bilbao	(Spain)
F	15	Álex Mumbrú	34 – 12 June 1979	2.02 m (6 ft 8 in)	Bilbao	(Spain)

Head coach

- (Spain) Juan Antonio Orenga

Assistant coach(es)

- (Spain) Jenaro Díaz
- (Spain) Jaume Ponsarnau

Legend

- (C) Team captain
- Club – describes last
  club before the tournament
- Age – describes age
  on 4 September 2013

== Group D ==
=== Finland ===
Finland men's national basketball team roster
Players
Coaches

Pos.	No.	Name	Age – Date of birth	Height	Club	Ctr.
G	4	Mikko Koivisto	26 – 18 April 1987	1.94 m (6 ft 4 in)	Nilan Bisons	(Finland)
C	5	Antti Nikkilä	35 – 25 August 1978	2.10 m (6 ft 11 in)	Tampereen Pyrintö	(Finland)
F	6	Kimmo Muurinen	32 – 23 February 1981	2.02 m (6 ft 8 in)	Nilan Bisons	(Finland)
G	7	Shawn Huff	29 – 5 May 1984	1.98 m (6 ft 6 in)	Orlandina Basket	(Italy)
F	8	Gerald Lee	25 – 23 November 1987	2.08 m (6 ft 10 in)	Budućnost Podgorica	(Montenegro)
G	9	Sasu Salin	22 – 11 June 1991	1.91 m (6 ft 3 in)	KK Union Olimpija	(Slovenia)
F	10	Tuukka Kotti	32 – 18 March 1981	2.05 m (6 ft 9 in)	Nilan Bisons	(Finland)
G	11	Petteri Koponen	25 – 13 April 1988	1.94 m (6 ft 4 in)	Khimki	(Russia)
G	12	Samuel Haanpää	26 – 27 September 1986	2.03 m (6 ft 8 in)	Coruña	(Spain)
F	13	Hanno Möttölä	36 – 9 September 1976	2.09 m (6 ft 10 in)	Torpan Pojat	(Finland)
G	14	Roope Ahonen	23 – 12 June 1990	1.87 m (6 ft 2 in)	Borås Basket	(Sweden)
G	15	Teemu Rannikko	32 – 9 September 1980	1.89 m (6 ft 2 in)	Joensuun Kataja	(Finland)

Head coach

- (Finland) Henrik Dettmann

Assistant coach(es)

- (Finland) Pekka Salminen
- (Finland) Jukka Toijala
- (Finland) Lassi Tuovi

Legend

- (C) Team captain
- Club – describes last
  club before the tournament
- Age – describes age
  on 4 September 2013

=== Greece ===
Greece men's national basketball team roster
Players
Coaches

Pos.	No.	Name	Age – Date of birth	Height	Club	Ctr.
G	4	Kostas Sloukas	23 – 15 January 1990	1.90 m (6 ft 3 in)	Olympiacos	(Greece)
C	5	Ioannis Bourousis	29 – 17 November 1983	2.15 m (7 ft 1 in)	Real Madrid	(Spain)
G	6	Nikos Zisis	30 – 16 August 1983	1.97 m (6 ft 6 in)	UNICS Kazan	(Russia)
G	7	Vassilis Spanoulis	31 – 7 August 1982	1.93 m (6 ft 4 in)	Olympiacos	(Greece)
F	8	Stratos Perperoglou	29 – 7 August 1984	2.03 m (6 ft 8 in)	Olympiacos	(Greece)
F	9	Antonis Fotsis (C)	32 – 1 April 1981	2.09 m (6 ft 10 in)	Panathinaikos	(Greece)
F	10	Kostas Papanikolaou	23 – 1 August 1990	2.06 m (6 ft 9 in)	FC Barcelona	(Spain)
C	11	Vassilis Kavvadas	21 – 28 December 1991	2.06 m (6 ft 9 in)	Olympiacos	(Greece)
F/C	12	Loukas Mavrokefalidis	29 – 25 July 1984	2.10 m (6 ft 11 in)	Panathinaikos	(Greece)
F	13	Kostas Kaimakoglou	30 – 15 March 1983	2.05 m (6 ft 9 in)	UNICS Kazan	(Russia)
G	14	Michael Bramos	26 – 27 May 1987	1.98 m (6 ft 6 in)	Panathinaikos	(Greece)
F	15	Georgios Printezis	28 – 22 February 1985	2.06 m (6 ft 9 in)	Olympiacos	(Greece)

Head coach

- (Italy) Andrea Trinchieri

Assistant coach(es)

- (Greece) Ilias Kantzouris
- (Greece) Giorgos Limniatis
- (Greece) Dimitrios Papanikolaou

Legend

- (C) Team captain
- Club – describes last
  club before the tournament
- Age – describes age
  on 4 September 2013

=== Italy ===
Italy men's national basketball team roster
Players
Coaches

Pos.	No.	Name	Age – Date of birth	Height	Club	Ctr.
G	4	Pietro Aradori	24 – 9 December 1988	1.94 m (6 ft 4 in)	Pallacanestro Cantù	(Italy)
F	5	Alessandro Gentile	20 – 12 November 1992	2.00 m (6 ft 7 in)	Olimpia Milano	(Italy)
F	6	Guido Rosselli	30 – 25 May 1983	1.98 m (6 ft 6 in)	Reyer Venezia Mestre	(Italy)
G	7	Luca Vitali	27 – 9 May 1986	2.01 m (6 ft 7 in)	Reyer Venezia Mestre	(Italy)
G	8	Giuseppe Poeta	27 – 12 September 1985	1.91 m (6 ft 3 in)	Virtus Bologna	(Italy)
F	9	Nicolò Melli	22 – 26 January 1991	2.05 m (6 ft 9 in)	Olimpia Milano	(Italy)
G	10	Marco Belinelli	27 – 25 March 1986	1.96 m (6 ft 5 in)	San Antonio Spurs	(United States)
G	11	Travis Diener	31 – 1 March 1982	1.85 m (6 ft 1 in)	Dinamo Sassari	(Italy)
C	12	Marco Cusin	28 – 28 February 1985	2.11 m (6 ft 11 in)	Pallacanestro Cantù	(Italy)
F	13	Luigi Datome	25 – 27 November 1987	2.03 m (6 ft 8 in)	Detroit Pistons	(United States)
C	14	Daniele Magro	26 – 14 April 1987	2.08 m (6 ft 10 in)	Reyer Venezia Mestre	(Italy)
G	15	Andrea Cinciarini	27 – 21 June 1986	1.90 m (6 ft 3 in)	Pallacanestro Reggiana	(Italy)

Head coach

- (Italy) Simone Pianigiani

Assistant coach(es)

- (Italy) Luca Delmonte
- (Italy) Andrea Capobianco

Legend

- (C) Team captain
- Club – describes last
  club before the tournament
- Age – describes age
  on 4 September 2013

=== Russia ===
Russia men's national basketball team roster
Players
Coaches

Pos.	No.	Name	Age – Date of birth	Height	Club	Ctr.
F	4	Sergey Karasev	19 – 26 October 1993	2.03 m (6 ft 8 in)	Cleveland Cavaliers	(United States)
C	5	Dmitri Sokolov	28 – 21 January 1985	2.14 m (7 ft 0 in)	UNICS Kazan	(Russia)
F	6	Evgeny Valiev	23 – 3 May 1990	2.05 m (6 ft 9 in)	Triumph Lyubertsy	(Russia)
G	7	Vitaly Fridzon	27 – 14 October 1985	1.95 m (6 ft 5 in)	CSKA Moscow	(Russia)
G	8	Evgeny Voronov	27 – 7 May 1986	1.94 m (6 ft 4 in)	CSKA Moscow	(Russia)
G/F	9	Dmitry Kulagin	21 – 1 July 1992	1.97 m (6 ft 6 in)	Krasnye Krylya Samara	(Russia)
G	10	Alexey Shved	24 – 16 December 1988	1.98 m (6 ft 6 in)	Minnesota Timberwolves	(United States)
F	11	Semyon Antonov	24 – 18 July 1989	2.02 m (6 ft 8 in)	Nizhny Novgorod	(Russia)
F	12	Sergei Monia	30 – 15 April 1983	2.02 m (6 ft 8 in)	Khimki	(Russia)
G	13	Dmitry Grigoryevich Khvostov	24 – 21 August 1989	1.90 m (6 ft 3 in)	Nizhny Novgorod	(Russia)
C	14	Aleksey Savrasenko	34 – 28 February 1979	2.15 m (7 ft 1 in)	Lokomotiv-Kuban	(Russia)
G	15	Anton Ponkrashov	27 – 23 April 1986	2.00 m (6 ft 7 in)	Krasnye Krylya Samara	(Russia)

Head coach

- (Russia) Vasiliy Karasev

Assistant coach(es)

- (Russia) Oleg Rezvyi
- (Russia) Alexey Vasilyev

Legend

- (C) Team captain
- Club – describes last
  club before the tournament
- Age – describes age
  on 4 September 2013

=== Sweden ===
Sweden men's national basketball team roster
Players
Coaches

Pos.	No.	Name	Age – Date of birth	Height	Club	Ctr.
G	4	Ludvig Håkanson	17 – 22 March 1996	1.87 m (6 ft 2 in)	FC Barcelona	(Spain)
F	5	Jonathan Skjöldebrand	30 – 30 August 1983	2.06 m (6 ft 9 in)	Hapoel Tel Aviv	(Israel)
C	6	Joakim Kjellbom	34 – 22 April 1979	2.13 m (7 ft 0 in)	Norrköping Dolphins	(Sweden)
G	7	Dino Pita	24 – 20 September 1988	1.92 m (6 ft 4 in)	Södertälje Kings	(Sweden)
F	8	Anton Gaddefors	23 – 4 November 1989	2.00 m (6 ft 7 in)	Sundsvall Dragons	(Sweden)
C	9	Brice Massamba	25 – 8 July 1988	2.07 m (6 ft 9 in)	Étoile du Sahel	(Tunisia)
G	10	Kenny Grant	31 – 16 March 1982	1.88 m (6 ft 2 in)	SLUC Nancy	(France)
F	11	Jonas Jerebko	26 – 2 March 1987	2.08 m (6 ft 10 in)	Detroit Pistons	(United States)
G	12	Thomas Massamba	28 – 28 March 1985	1.85 m (6 ft 1 in)	PBC Lukoil Academic	(Bulgaria)
F	13	Erik Rush	25 – 1 January 1988	1.97 m (6 ft 6 in)	Pallacanestro Varese	(Italy)
F	14	Jeffery Taylor	24 – 23 May 1989	2.00 m (6 ft 7 in)	Charlotte Bobcats	(United States)
F	15	Viktor Gaddefors	20 – 8 October 1992	2.01 m (6 ft 7 in)	Virtus Bologna	(Italy)

Head coach

- (United States) Brad Dean

Assistant coach(es)

- (Sweden) Torbjörn Gehrke
- (Sweden) Stefan Timbus

Legend

- (C) Team captain
- Club – describes last
  club before the tournament
- Age – describes age
  on 4 September 2013

=== Turkey ===
Turkey men's national basketball team roster
Players
Coaches

Pos.	No.	Name	Age – Date of birth	Height	Club	Ctr.
G	4	Doğuş Balbay	24 – 21 January 1989	1.85 m (6 ft 1 in)	Anadolu Efes	(Turkey)
G	5	Sinan Güler	29 – 8 November 1983	1.96 m (6 ft 5 in)	Galatasaray	(Turkey)
F	6	Emir Preldžič	25 – 6 September 1987	2.06 m (6 ft 9 in)	Fenerbahçe Ülker	(Turkey)
G	7	Birkan Batuk	23 – 30 January 1990	1.96 m (6 ft 5 in)	Anadolu Efes	(Turkey)
F	8	Ersan İlyasova	26 – 15 May 1987	2.08 m (6 ft 10 in)	Milwaukee Bucks	(United States)
C	9	Semih Erden	27 – 28 July 1986	2.13 m (7 ft 0 in)	Anadolu Efes	(Turkey)
F	10	Serhat Çetin	27 – 23 February 1986	1.97 m (6 ft 6 in)	Tofaş	(Turkey)
C	11	Oğuz Savaş	26 – 13 July 1987	2.13 m (7 ft 0 in)	Fenerbahçe Ülker	(Turkey)
F	12	Kerem Gönlüm	35 – 22 November 1977	2.08 m (6 ft 10 in)	Anadolu Efes	(Turkey)
G	13	Ender Arslan	30 – 13 January 1983	1.90 m (6 ft 3 in)	Galatasaray S.K.	(Turkey)
C	14	Ömer Aşık	27 – 4 July 1986	2.13 m (7 ft 0 in)	Houston Rockets	(United States)
F	15	Hedo Türkoğlu (C)	34 – 19 March 1979	2.08 m (6 ft 10 in)	Orlando Magic	(United States)

Head coach

- (Montenegro) Bogdan Tanjević

Assistant coach(es)

- (Bosnia and Herzegovina) Nihat İziç
- (Turkey) Ertuğrul Erdoğan
- (Turkey) Ömer Ugurata

Legend

- (C) Team captain
- Club – describes last
  club before the tournament
- Age – describes age
  on 4 September 2013
