= Gary Smith =

Gary or Garry Smith may refer to:

== Music ==
- Gary Smith (drummer) (born 1950), member of Chase and Survivor
- Gary Smith (guitarist), British avant-garde guitarist, improviser and composer
- Gary Smith (heavy metal guitarist)
- Gary Smith (record producer) (1958–2023), entrepreneur, record producer, and artists' manager

== Politics ==
- Garry R. Smith (born 1957), American politician in South Carolina
- Gary Smith Jr. (born 1972), American politician in Louisiana
- Gary Smith, burgess of Woodsboro, Maryland

== Sports ==
- Gary Smith (cricketer) (born 1958), South African cricketer
- Gary Smith (footballer, born 1955), English footballer
- Gary Smith (footballer, born 1966), St Kitts and Nevis international footballer
- Gary Smith (footballer, born 1968), English football player and coach
- Gary Smith (footballer, born 1971), Scottish footballer
- Gary Smith (footballer, born 1984), English footballer
- Gary Smith (footballer, born 1991), Scottish footballer
- Gary Smith (ice hockey) (born 1944), ice hockey goaltender
- Gary Smith (bowls) (born 1958), English world indoor champion bowler
- Gary R Smith (born 1962), English bowls player
- Gary Smith (rugby league, York born) (born 1954), English rugby league footballer who played in the 1970s and 1980s
- Gary Smith (rugby league) (born 1963), Australian rugby league footballer who played in the 1980s and 1990s
- Garry Smith (rugby league) (1941–2025), New Zealand international rugby league player
- Gary Smith (sailor) (born 1952), Australian Olympic sailor

== Other ==
- Gary Smith (TV producer) (1935–2025), American television producer
- Gary Smith (EDA analyst) (1941–2015), electronic design automation business analyst
- Gary Smith (economist) (born 1945), economist, author
- Gary Smith (Ciena CEO), telecommunications industry executive
- Gary Smith (sportswriter) (born 1953), long-time writer for Sports Illustrated
- Gary T. Smith (born 1954), American screenwriter, actor and director
- Gary Smith (philosopher) (born 1954), American philosopher and culture manager
- Gary Mark Smith (born 1956), American street photographer
- Gary Smith (trade unionist) (born 1965), Scottish trade union leader
- Gary Smith, the main antagonist of the video game Bully

== See also ==
- Gary Smyth (born 1969), Northern Irish footballer
- Gary Smyth (loyalist) (born 1963/1964), Northern Irish former loyalist paramilitary
