= Alexander Polzin =

Alexander Polzin (born 1973) is a German sculptor, painter, graphic artist, costume and set designer.

== Life ==
Born in Berlin, originally trained as a stonemason, Polzin launched his international career as a freelance sculptor, painter, graphic artist and stage designer in 1991, building on the success of his first exhibition in Berlin's Kulturhaus-Pankow four years earlier. In 1994 Polzin was invited by Dr. Gary Smith, founding director of the Einstein Forum in Potsdam, to present the first exhibition of solo work at the Institute: Arbeiten im Einstein Forum. The introduction to the exhibition catalogue was written by Professor Hans Belting. Polzin's series of paintings, Monster, appeared in a collection of images and essays edited by the pioneering American cultural historian, Sander Gilman, published in 1995.

Exhibitions of his works include the Getty Center in Los Angeles (2000), Budapest, Bucharest and Naples (2001), at the Institute for Advanced Study Berlin (2004), Bard College, New York (2006), Van Leer Institute of Israel (2007), San Francisco International Arts Festival (2008) and at the Teatro Real in Madrid (2011). Sculptures in public places include "The Fallen Angel" in front of the Semper Observatory Collegium Helveticum in Zurich, the "Giordano Bruno Memorial" in Potsdamer Platz in Berlin, "Socrates" on the campus of Tel Aviv University, and "The Couple," commissioned by the Opera National de Bastille, Paris.

Polzin has worked with the composers Amos Elkana, Helmut Lachenmann and György Kurtág connecting their music with visual arts. Polzin was a guest at the International Artist House in Herzliya, Israel, ETH Zurich, The Montalvo Arts Center in Saratoga, California and first 'Artist in Residence' at the Center for Advanced Study at the Käte Hamburger Kolleg "Law as Culture" in Bonn.

== Stage and costume designs (selection) ==
- 2015 – Stage design Mauricio Sotelo "El Público" (World Premiere) Teatro Real, Madrid, Director: Robert Castro – Conductor: Pablo Heras-Casado
- 2015 – Stage design Christoph Willibald Gluck "Iphigénie en Tauride" Grand Théâtre de Genève, Director: Lukas Hemleb – Conductor: Hartmut Haenchen
- 2014 – Direction and Stage design Ludwig van Beethoven "Fidelio" Tiroler Festspiele Erl, Co-director: Sommer Ulrickson, Conductor: Gustav Kuhn
- 2014 – Stage design Richard Wagner "Lohengrin" Teatro Real (Madrid), Director: Lukas Hemleb – Conductor: Hartmut Haenchen
- 2013 – Stage design Richard Wagner "Parsifal" Beijing Music Festival
- 2013 – Stage design Wolfgang Rihm "The Conquest of Mexico" Teatro Real (Madrid), Director: Pierre Audi – Conductor: Alejo Pérez
- 2013 – Stage design Richard Wagner "Parsifal" Salzburg Easter Festival Director: Michael Schulz – Conductor: Christian Thielemann
- 2012 – Stage/costume design "Never Mind" in Sophiensaele / Berlin – Director: Sommer Ulrickson
- 2012 – Stage design "Sing Brother Sing" Hao Jiang Tian in China NCPA Concert Hall Orchestra Beijing/Shanghai
- 2011 – Stage design "La página en blanco" Teatro Real (Madrid), premiere – Composer Pilar Jurado – Director David Hermann
- 2010 – Stage design "Kurs:Liebe" Freilichtspiele Schwäbisch Hall, Director: Sommer Ulrickson, Music: Moritz Gagern
- 2010 – Stage design "Lovesick" Neuköllner Oper, Director: Sommer Ulrickson, Music: Moritz Gagern
- 2010 – "Baucis and Philemon" by Joseph Haydn and Konstantia Gourzi – Festival Europäische Kirchenmusik, Schwäbisch Gmünd
- 2009 – G. Verdi "Rigoletto" Deutsche Oper am Rhein, Director David Hermann
- 2009 – Stage/costume design "Winter – a German fairytale" based on H.Heine – Schauspiel Frankfurt, Director Sommer Ulrickson/ Mark Jackson
- 2009 – Stage design "After Hamlet" a dance music theatre production by Amos Elkana and Sommer Ulrickson in Santa Cruz, California.
- 2008 – Stage design Benjamin Britten's "Rape of Lucretia" (Director: David Hermann) at Oldenburgisches Staatstheater
- 2008 – Artistic Consultant for Sommer Ulrickson's "Foreign Bodies" University of California, Santa Cruz
- 2007 – Stage design "Yes, Yes to Moscow" Deutsches Theater Berlin
- 2007 – Stage design "Woyzeck" Staatstheater Schwerin
- 2004 – Stage design "Creatures of Habit" Sophiensaele, Berlin
- 2003 – Stage design "Slaughter" Hochschule für Film und Fernsehen, Potsdam
- 2003 – Stage design "Jerusalem Syndrome" Sophiensaele, Berlin
- 2003 – Stage design "Baucis and Philemon" Staatsoper Berlin
- 2002 – Stage design "Remains" Sophiensaele, Berlin

== Sculptures and projects (selection) ==
- 2015 – Cover design for "Concepts and the Social order, Robert K. Merton and the Future of Sociology", Edited by Yehuda Elkana, András Szigeti, and György Lissauer, CEU Press
- 2015 – Cover design for "Reflexiones sobre la ópera, el arte, y la política" by Gerard Mortier
- 2014 – Visualisation of Edvard Grieg "Peer Gynt" for Bergen Philharmonic Orchestra, Conductor: Eivind Aadland
- 2014 – Pictorial Representation of Leonard Bernstein's Symphony no. 2 "Age of Anxiety" for Aarhus Symphony Orchestra, Conductor: Benjamin Shwartz
- 2014 – Cover design for programme for 2014/15 season, Teatro Real, Madrid
- 2013 – Programme design for 2013/14 season, Teatro Real, Madrid
- 2013 – Cover design for Parsifal, Salzburg Easter Festival
- 2012 – Sculptural intervention for Helmut Lachenmann – Concert Celebration Stiftung Schloss Neuhardenberg
- 2012 – Programme design for Turku music festival Finland
- 2012 – Homage to Teatro Real for the magazine Intramuros
- 2011 – Unveiling of the sculpture "Homage to Bhimrao Ramji Ambedkar"; Käte Hamburger Kolleg "Law as Culture" in the presence of His Excellency Ajit Kumar, Consul General of the Republic of India in Frankfurt am Main
- 2010 – Book on Sculpture "Requiem – Homage to György Kurtág", Mathes und Seitz (Authors: Moshe Zuckermann, Jean Louis Fabiani, Peter Stefan Jungk, Judith Frigyesi Niran, Andre Plesu, Durs Gruenbein, Antjie Krog, Amnon Raz-Krakotzkin, Martin Treml, Almuth Sh. Bruckstein Coruh, Annett Groeschner, Michael Maede, Karl Heinz Barck, Peter Esterhazy, Hannah Duebgen, Michael Roes, Bettina Motikat)
- 2009 – Cover design – Oliver Schneller – Deutscher Musik Rat
- 2009 – Homage to Robert Merton – sound sculptures together with Amos Elkana for the conference "Concepts and the Social Order: Robert K. Merton and the Future of Sociology"
- 2009 – Cover design for Moshe Zuckermann "Sixty Years of Israel", Pahl-Rugenstein Publishers
- 2008/09 – Illustrations für Lettre International
- 2008 – Award Ceremony to Kofi Annan – recipient of the "kleine Bruno skulptur" (Open Society Prize)

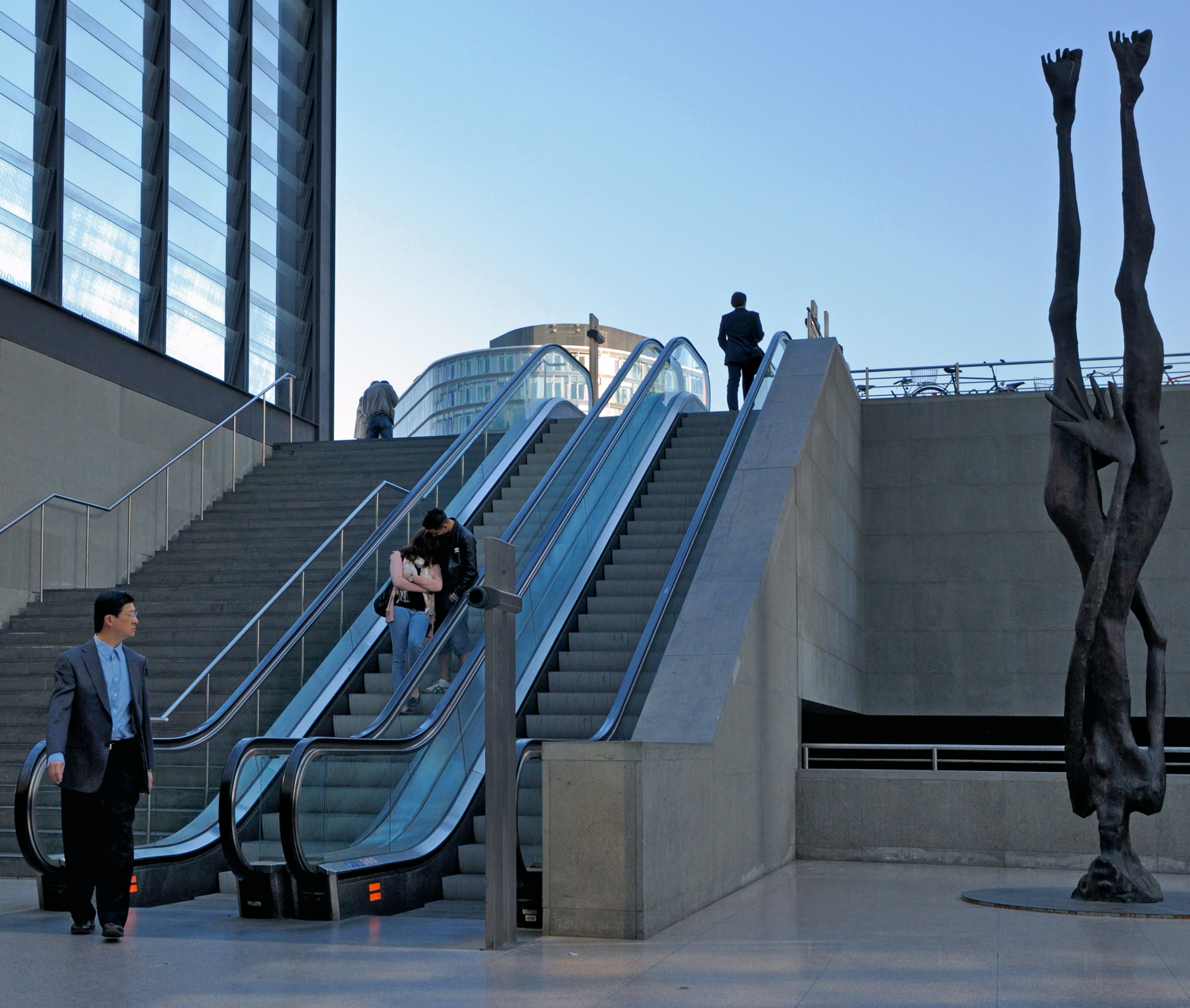
Installation of Giordano Bruno Monument at Potsdamer Platz

- 2008 – Installation of Giordano Bruno Monument at Potsdamer Platz, Berlin (Bahnhof Potsdamer Platz – Deutsche Bahn AG). Speeches by the Italian Ambassador (Puri Purini) and German author Durs Grünbein
- 2008 – Memorial stone for George Tabori in the Dorotheenstadt cemetery, Berlin
- 2008 – Inauguration of the sculpture "The Couple" in the foyer of the Opera National de Paris – speech by Prof. Hans Belting
- 2006 – Design and production of the Elemér Hantos Prize for the Central Europe Foundation, Zürich
- 2005 – "neunzehnter" exhibition in the Berliner Kunsthaus ACUD
- 2005 – Cover photo for Rigas Laiks (Kunstmagazin / Lettland)
- 2004 – Portrait of Josef Tal for CD recording by NDR Radio Philharmonie
- 2004 – Series of pictures and cover for book on Heiner Müller "Kalkfell II" Academy of the Arts
- 2003 – Series of six paintings of Thomas Brasch for a book published by the Academy of Arts, Berlin. Bought for the Collection of Foreign Ministry
- 2002 – Sculptures commissioned for the ETH Zürich
- 2002 – Series of paintings Lettre International Herbst
- 2001 – Memorial stone for Thomas Brasch in the Dorotheenstadt cemetery Berlin
- 2001 – Presentation in the Arts Gallery, Berlin on Long Night of Sciences
- 2001 – Commission for the mural "Chaim's Brief" for the renovated Jewish Orphanage Berlin-Pankow / Installation of the granite sculpture "The Stone Merchant" in front of the orphanage
- 2000 – Central European University in Budapest: Giordano Bruno Monument (Sculpture)

== Exhibitions (selection) ==
- 2015 – Kunstmuseum Ahrenshoop "Aus meinem Augenfenster...Hommage an Thomas Brasch"
- 2015 – Grand Théâtre de Genève
- 2015 – Maestro Arts, London "Remains – Opera, Art, Music"
- 2014 – Galerie Kornfeld, Berlin
- 2013 – Maestro Arts, London
- 2013 – Anna Akhmatova Literary and Memorial Museum, St. Petersburg
- 2013 – Salzburg Easter Festival
- 2011 – Sculptural exhibition Teatro Real Madrid
- 2011 – Presentation of the sculptures series äsentation der Skulpturenserie "Five sculptural sketches of Caravaggio's David and Goliath" with Prof. Hans Belting; Käte Hamburger Kolleg "Law as Culture" Bonn
- 2008 – ArtworkSF, San Francisco International Arts Festival
- 2008 – jw Galerie, Berlin
- 2007 – Van Leer Jerusalem Institute, Israel
- 2007 – International Artists House Herzliya, Israel
- 2007 – Solo Exhibition The Negev Museum of Art, Tel Be'er Sheva, Israel
- 2006 – Felicja Blumental Center Tel Aviv, Israel
- 2006 – Schloss Neuhardenberg, "Homage to Kurtag"
- 2006 – Bard College, New York
- 2006 – Solo Exhibition Goethe-Institut Los Angeles (opening speech: Hans Ulrich Gumbrecht)
- 2006 – Goethe-Institut New York (opening speech: Edward Mendelson)
- 2004 – Berlin Institute for Advanced Study (opening speech: Durs Grünbein)
- 2004 – "Age of Anxiety" Opendoors Openeyes – Bordeaux, France
- 2004 – shadow-collaborations, Chernoff Gallery, Novosibirsk, Russia
- 2001 – Martin-Gropius-Bau "Theatre of Nature and Art": "Meditierende Gruppe" (Skulpturengruppe)
- 2001 – Goethe-Institut, Naples, Bucharest and Budapest Exhibition "Age of Anxiety" (Eroeffnungsreden: Imre Kertész, Andrei Pleșu)
- 1999 – "Age of Anxiety" in Galerie Forum Amalienpark, Berlin: 99 paintings inspired by W. H. Auden's poem of the same title (opening speech: Moshe Zuckermann)
- 1998 – Galerie Ariadne in Vienna (opening speech: Herbert Lachmayer)
- 1998 – Ägyptisches Museum, Berlin (opening speech: Elmar Zorn)
- 1997–2001 – Einstein Forum, Potsdam with pictures and sculptures (opening speech: Gary Smith)
- 1997 – Berlin-Brandenburgische Akademie der Wissenschaften (opening speech: Dieter Simon)
- 1995 – Givat Ha Viva Kibbutz, (Israel) Exhibition "Monster" (20 paintings) followed by publication of the book "Abortion" with images and essays edited by Sander Gilman (opening speech: Yehuda Elkana)

== Artist in residence (selection) ==
- 2010/11 – Artist-in-Residence Käte Hamburger Kolleg "Law as Culture", Bonn
- 2008 – Visiting Artist at the University of California, Santa Cruz
- 2006 – Artist-in-Residence Villa Montalvo and Don Lucas Artists Program
- 2005 – McCloy Fellowship in Art
- 2000 – Getty Center Los Angeles
- 1998 – Collegium Helveticum Zürich, Exhibition and Artist in Residence ETH Zürich
- 1996/97 – Invitation to International Artists House in Herzliya, Israel (6 months): sculpture "The Stone Merchant" and Exhibition (Text: "The Stone Beast has lost its earlobe")

== Curator (selection) ==
- 2011 – Curator of the conference "Guilt II" at the Käte Hamburger Kolleg "Law as Culture" Bonn, including guest speakers Moshe Zuckermann, Toshio Hosokawa, Fawwaz Traboulsi and Ryoko Aoki
- 2010 – Curator of the conference "Guilt I" at the Käte Hamburger Kolleg "Right as Culture" Bonn, including guest speakers Sudhir Kakar, Ramin Jahanbegloo, Antjie Krog and Fritz Lichtenhahn
- 2009 – Consultant for Exhibition design "Images in the Islamic World" in Martin-Gropius-Bau, Berlin
- 2009 – Guest Professor for Stage Design at UCSC, USA.
