= Ainars Bagatskis =

Latvian basketball player and coach

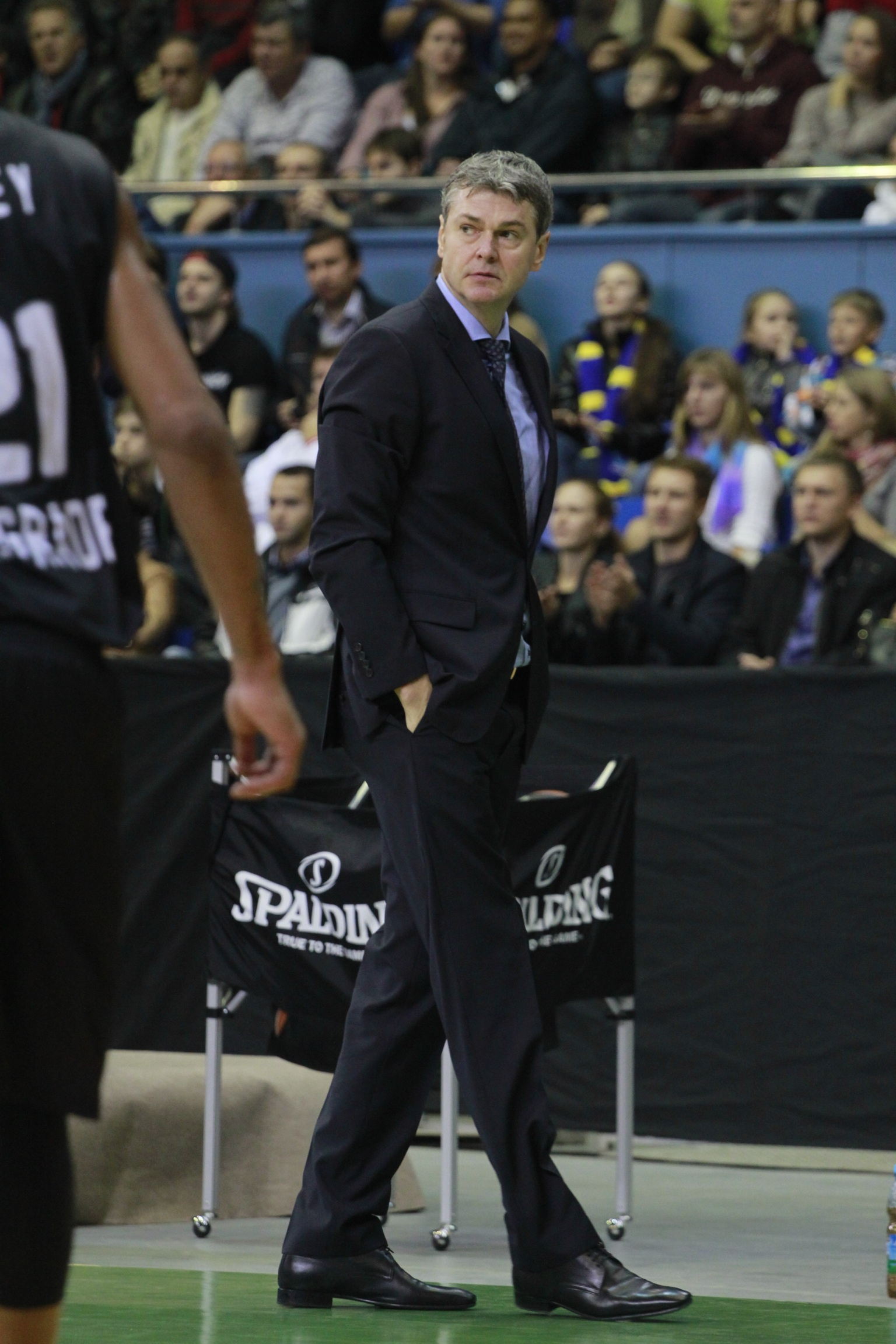
- Bagatskis as the Budivelnyk Kyiv head coach in October 2013

Benfica
- Title: Head coach
- League: Liga Portuguesa de Basquetebol

Personal information
- Born: 29 March 1967 (age 59) Riga, Latvian SSR, USSR
- Listed height: 6 ft 6 in (1.98 m)
- Listed weight: 194 lb (88 kg)

Career information
- NBA draft: 1989: undrafted
- Playing career: 1985–2006
- Position: Small forward
- Coaching career: 2005–present

Career history

Playing
- 1985–1987: VEF Rīga
- 1987–1991: Rīgas ASK
- 1991–1992: Princips
- 1992–1993: Gimle
- 1993–1994: Brocēni
- 1994–1995: Rīgas Laiks
- 1995–1998: Brocēni
- 1998–1999: Ericsson Bobry Bytom
- 1999–2000: Hoop Pekaes Pruszków
- 2000–2001: JDA Dijon
- 2001–2003: Ventspils
- 2003–2004: Evraz
- 2004–2005: Žalgiris Kaunas
- 2005–2006: Barons Rīga

Coaching
- 2005–2006: Barons Rīga
- 2006: Žalgiris Kaunas
- 2007–2009: Valmiera
- 2009–2010: Enisey
- 2010–2017: Latvia
- 2011: Sokhumi
- 2011–2012: Kryvbas
- 2012–2014: Budivelnyk
- 2014–2016: Nizhny Novgorod
- 2016: Darüşşafaka (assistant)
- 2016–2017: Maccabi Tel Aviv
- 2018–2019: Brose Bamberg
- 2019–2023: Ukraine
- 2019–2022: Kyiv-Basket
- 2022–2025: CSO Voluntari
- 2025–present: Ukraine
- 2025–2026: Śląsk Wrocław
- 2026–present: Benfica

Career highlights
- As a player: Norwegian League champion (1993); 6× Latvian League champion (1995, 1997–1999, 2003, 2004); LKL Three-point Shootout champion (2004); 2× Lithuanian League champion (2005, 2006); Baltic League champion (2006); As a coach: Lithuanian League champion (2006); Baltic League champion (2006); 2× Ukrainian SuperLeague champion (2013, 2014); Israeli Cup winner (2017)

Ainars Bagatskis (born 29 March 1967) is a Latvian former professional basketball player and coach who was most recently the head coach of Benfica and Ukraine men's national team.

== Playing career ==
=== Club career ===
During his club playing career, Bagatskis played at the small forward position.

=== Latvia national team ===
Bagatskis was a member of the senior Latvia national basketball team from 1992 to 2006. With Latvia, he played in four EuroBasket tournaments.

== Coaching career ==
Bagatskis began his coaching career in the 2005–06 season, while playing in his last season of professional basketball with Barons Rīga, where he stayed for one season. In 2006, he had a short stint as a head coach in one of the greatest Lithuanian teams, Žalgiris Kaunas. Since 2007, he worked as a head coach in several teams, including Valmiera until 2009, the Russian team Yenisey Krasnoyarsk in the 2009–10 season, Sokhumi, and Kryvbasbasket until 2012.

In June 2012, he became the head coach of the Ukrainian team Budivelnyk Kyiv. He stayed with them for two seasons, winning the Ukrainian Basketball SuperLeague two times with them, in 2013 and 2014. In the 2013–14 season, his team made its first EuroLeague appearance in the club's history.

On 1 July 2014, he signed a one-year contract to become the head coach of the Russian team Nizhny Novgorod. Nizhny Novgorod ended their season in the VTB United League, after being eliminated by CSKA Moscow, with 3–0 series sweep, in the League's semifinals series.

On 18 June 2016, he signed a two-year contract to become an assistant coach of David Blatt's, with the Turkish club Darüşşafaka.

On 24 December 2016, Bagatskis became the head coach of the Israeli club Maccabi Tel Aviv.

On 16 May 2017, he parted ways with Maccabi Tel Aviv.

On 30 June 2018, he signed with Brose Bamberg of the Basketball Bundesliga.

On 17 June 2025, he signed with Śląsk Wrocław of the Polish Basketball League (PLK). On 29 April 2026, he was fired after four consecutive league losses.

=== National team ===
Following the departure of Kęstutis Kemzūra, in February 2010, he became a team selector for the senior Latvia national team. So far, his team made two EuroBasket appearances, at the EuroBasket 2011, in Lithuania, and at the EuroBasket 2013, in Slovenia.

== Career statistics ==
Legend
GP	Games played	GS	Games started	MPG	Minutes per game
FG%	Field-goal percentage	3P%	3-point field-goal percentage	FT%	Free-throw percentage
RPG	Rebounds per game	APG	Assists per game	SPG	Steals per game
BPG	Blocks per game	PPG	Points per game	PIR	Performance index rating
**Bold**	Career high

=== EuroLeague ===
Year	Team	GP	GS	MPG	FG%	3P%	FT%	RPG	APG	SPG	BPG	PPG	PIR
2003–04	Žalgiris	12	**9**	**24.0**	.386	.404	**.900**	**2.6**	**.8**	**.6**	.0	**9.5**	**7.0**
2004–05	Žalgiris	**17**	0	12.5	**.424**	**.426**	.882	.9	.4	.4	.0	5.5	3.7
Career		29	9	17.5	.406	.414	.894	1.6	.6	.4	.0	7.2	5.1

== Coaching record ==
Legend
G	Games coached	W	Games won	L	Games lost	W–L %	Win-loss %

Note: The EuroLeague is not the only competition in which the team played during the season. He also coached in domestic competition, and regional competition if applicable.

=== EuroLeague ===
Team	Year	G	W	L	W–L%	Result
Žalgiris	2005–06	1	0	1	.400	Eliminated in Top 16 stage
Žalgiris	2006–07	14	2	12	.143	Eliminated in regular season
Budivelnyk	2013–14	10	2	8	.200	Eliminated in regular season
Nizhny Novgorod	2014–15	24	8	16	.333	Eliminated in Top 16 stage
Maccabi	2016–17	16	5	11	.313	Eliminated in regular season
**Career**		74	21	53	.284	
