= Ukraine men's national basketball team =

Men's national basketball team representing Ukraine

Ukraine
- FIBA ranking: 37 ▲1 (1 September 2026)
- Joined FIBA: 1992
- FIBA zone: FIBA Europe
- National federation: FBU
- Coach: Ainars Bagatskis
- Nickname(s): Синьо-жовті (The Blue and Yellow); Збірна (The National Team)

FIBA World Cup
- Appearances: 1
- Medals: None

EuroBasket
- Appearances: 9
- Medals: None
Home	Away

First international
- Ukraine 87–76 England (Wrocław, Poland; 30 May 1993)

Biggest win
- Iceland 62–105 Ukraine (Reykjavík, Iceland; 22 November 2000)

Biggest defeat
- Italy 99–62 Ukraine (Vršac, Serbia and Montenegro; 18 September 2005)

The Ukraine men's national basketball team (Ukrainian: збірна України з баскетболу, romanized: zbirna Ukrainy z basketbolu) represents Ukraine in international basketball competitions. They are controlled by the Basketball Federation of Ukraine.

After Ukrainian Independence from the Soviet Union in 1991, and joining FIBA in 1992, the national team played their first official match against England on 30 May 1993. Their biggest success so far on the international stage has been qualifying for the EuroBasket nine times, and reaching the FIBA World Cup for the first time in 2014.

== History ==
=== Gaining Independence ===
Before the Ukraine's independence from the Soviet Union in 1991, Ukrainian players took part on the Soviet Union national team during international competition. The Soviets were one of the strongest national teams in the world during this period.

=== EuroBasket 1997 ===
Ukraine made their EuroBasket debut in 1997. Their first match at the tournament was not a warm welcome for the national team, as they were demolished by Spain 54–82. With less than 24 hours to regroup for their next game, Ukraine faced Germany where they lost again, this time by the score of 81–60. In their final match of group play, they defeated Croatia 88–95, to earn their first ever win at the EuroBasket. Unfortunately, it wasn't enough for the team to advance to the knockout stage, as they were relegated to the classification rounds for 13th–16th place. There, the team defeated Latvia, and Slovenia to finish the tournament 13th overall.

=== EuroBasket 2013 ===
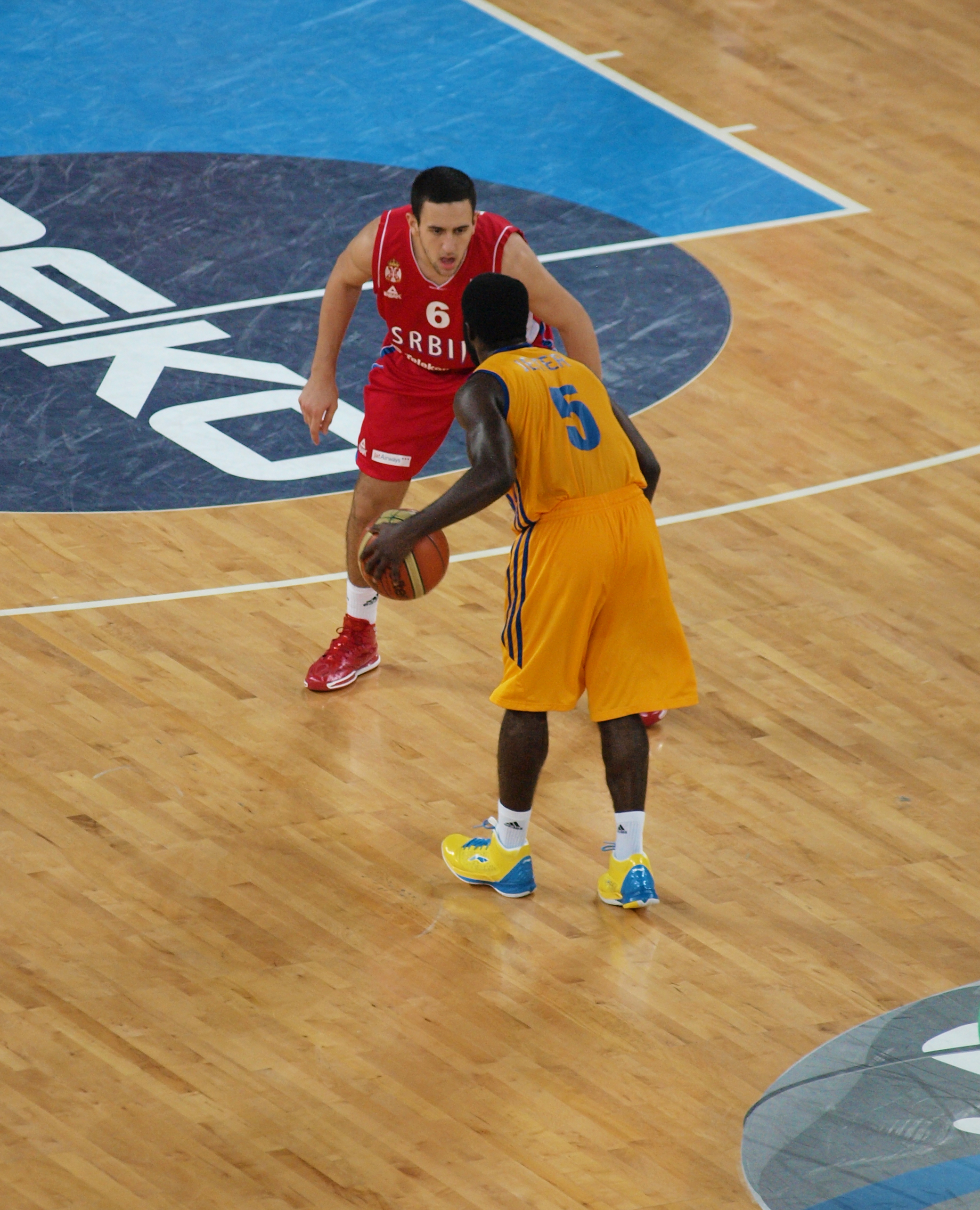
Eugene "Pooh" Jeter versus Vasilije Micić as Ukraine plays Serbia at Eurobasket 2013.

After failing to qualify for the EuroBasket in 1999, along with uninspiring results at the finals in 2001, 2003, 2005, and 2011 respectively, Ukraine was eager to turn their fortunes around at EuroBasket 2013. Ukraine was placed into Group A to begin their tournament run. The national team was victorious in their first three matches of the tournament, against Belgium, Israel, and Germany. Heading into their fourth match against the heavily favoured France, Ukraine displayed genuine toughness in a losing effort to the eventual tournament champions 71–77. In their final game of the preliminary phase, the team turned around and displayed resilience in blowing out Great Britain 68–87 to advance to the second group phase. There, they were blasted in their first match of group play against Latvia, but redeemed themselves with a quality victory over Serbia a few days later. Ukraine went on to lose their final game in the group to Lithuania, however, it was enough to clinch a spot into the knockout rounds. In the quarter-finals, Ukraine was paired up against Croatia, although the national team would come up short 84–72. With the loss, Ukraine went on to play in classification matches to determine 5th–8th place. The team defeated Italy, before falling to Slovenia to finish up in sixth place. It was the best result for Ukraine at the EuroBasket to that point.

=== 2014 FIBA World Cup ===
Ukraine made their first appearance on to the global stage at the 2014 FIBA World Cup, through their surprising performance at EuroBasket 2013. Led by former NBA head coach Mike Fratello, the national team won their first ever match in the World Cup, defeating the Dominican Republic 72–62. With their historic win under their belt, the team went into their second match of the tournament confident. However, Finland would pull out a narrow 81–76 victory to drop Ukraine to a record of (1–1). Entering their third match, Ukraine went up against Turkey, and the national team didn't disappoint. They eventually won a hard-fought 64–58 contest, before their pivotal game versus New Zealand.

With a berth into the Round of 16 on the line, Ukraine needed one more victory to advance. But they were unsuccessful in the crucial match, as they lost 73–61, to head into their do-or-die game against the tournament favourite United States in a dire position. In the must win game for Ukraine, the national team got off to a strong start, to even possess the lead after the first period. However, the Americans flexed their dominance thereafter, which led to the team being eliminated from the tournament altogether by the score of 71–95.

=== EuroBasket 2017 ===
After failing to make it past the group stage in 2015, Ukraine looked to make amends on the continental stage at EuroBasket 2017. Ukraine went through qualifiers where the team finished at a record of (4–2), to earn a spot back to the EuroBasket finals. Placed into Group B to begin the tournament, Ukraine was defeated in their first two matches against Germany and Italy. In their third game, the national team would eventually pickup their first victory against Georgia 81–88. Sitting at a record of (1–2), Lithuania handed Ukraine a damaging 62–94 defeat. With one game remaining in group play, and a spot into the knockout stage on the line, the team was up against one of the tournament co-hosts Israel. The national team ultimately displayed supreme urgency to punch their ticket to advance, with a dominant 64–88 win. Entering the Round of 16, however, was where Ukraine would come up short, by getting thoroughly defeated by the eventual champions of the tournament Slovenia 55–79.

=== 2019 FIBA World Cup qualification ===
For the first round of qualifying to the 2019 FIBA World Cup, Ukraine was drawn into Group B. The national team would open up their qualifying campaign with a solid road victory against Sweden 76–84. They would eventually attain a (3–3) record in the group to advance to the second and final phase of qualifying. In the second group phase of qualifiers, Ukraine started things off with a strong home win against Spain. Although the team dropped their second match of group play to Montenegro 90–84 to fall to (1–1). After that loss for Ukraine, the team would finish the rest of the qualifiers at a record of (5–7) overall, and were eliminated from World Cup contention.

== Competitive record ==
=== FIBA World Cup ===
World Cup					Qualification		
Year	Position	Pld	W	L	Pld	W	L
1950 to 1990	Part of Soviet Union						
(Canada) 1994	Did not qualify				EuroBasket served as qualifiers		
(Greece) 1998	Did not qualify				EuroBasket served as qualifiers		
(United States) 2002	Did not qualify				EuroBasket served as qualifiers		
(Japan) 2006	Did not qualify				EuroBasket served as qualifiers		
(Turkey) 2010	Did not qualify				EuroBasket served as qualifiers		
(Spain) 2014	18th	5	2	3	EuroBasket served as qualifiers		
(China) 2019	Did not qualify				12	5	7
(Philippines) (Japan) (Indonesia) 2023	Did not qualify				12	6	6
(Qatar) 2027	To be determined				In progress		
(France) 2031	To be determined				To be determined		
Total	1/8	5	2	3	24	11	13

=== Olympic Games ===
Olympic Games					Qualifying		
Year	Position	Pld	W	L	Pld	W	L
1948 to 1988	Part of Soviet Union						
(Spain) 1992	Did not enter				Did not enter		
(United States) 1996	Did not qualify				Did not qualify		
(Australia) 2000	Did not qualify				Did not qualify		
(Greece) 2004	Did not qualify				Did not qualify		
(China) 2008	Did not qualify				Did not qualify		
(United Kingdom) 2012	Did not qualify				Did not qualify		
(Brazil) 2016	Did not qualify				Did not qualify		
(Japan) 2020	Did not qualify				Did not qualify		
(France) 2024	Did not qualify				4	2	2
(United States) 2028	To be determined				To be determined		
Total	0/9				4	2	2

=== EuroBasket ===
EuroBasket					Qualification		
Year	Position	Pld	W	L	Pld	W	L
1947 to 1991	Part of Soviet Union						
(Germany) 1993	Did not qualify				8	4	4
(Greece) 1995	Did not qualify				11	5	6
(Spain) 1997	13th	5	3	2	10	8	2
(France) 1999	Did not qualify				10	5	5
(Turkey) 2001	16th	3	1	2	10	7	3
(Sweden) 2003	14th	3	0	3	10	7	3
(Serbia and Montenegro) 2005	16th	3	0	3	6	3	3
(Spain) 2007	Did not qualify				12	4	8
(Poland) 2009	Did not qualify				12	5	7
(Lithuania) 2011	17th	5	2	3	8	3	5
(Slovenia) 2013	6th	11	6	5	8	6	2
(France) (Croatia) (Germany) (Latvia) 2015	22nd	5	1	4	Direct qualification		
(Finland) (Israel) (Romania) (Turkey) 2017	15th	6	2	4	6	4	2
(Czech Republic) (Georgia (country)) (Italy) (Germany) 2022	12th	6	3	3	6	4	2
(Cyprus) (Finland) (Poland) (Latvia) 2025	Did not qualify				6	1	5
(Estonia) (Greece) (Slovenia) (Spain) 2029	To be determined				To be determined		
Total	9/15	47	18	29	123	66	57

== Results and fixtures ==
Win Loss

=== 2025 ===
6 August 2025 2027 FIBA World Cup pre-qualifiers – 2nd round	Switzerland	66–64	Ukraine	Fribourg, Switzerland
19:00 (UTC+2)	Scoring by quarter: 18–14, 12–13, 15–20, 21–17
	Pts: Fofana 18; Rebs: T. Ročak 7 Asts: Fofana 6	Boxscore	Pts: Tkachenko 13; Rebs: Sanon 7 Asts: Kovliar 10	Arena: Site Sportif Saint-Léonard; Referees: Boris Krejić (SVN), Saverio Lanzarini (ITA), Ivor Matějek (CZE)

9 August 2025 2027 FIBA World Cup pre-qualifiers – 2nd round	Ukraine	80–71	Slovakia	Riga, Latvia
17:00 (UTC+3)	Scoring by quarter: 24–24, 21–14, 17–14, 18–19
	Pts: Sanon 23; Rebs: Bobrov, Lypovyy 8 Asts: Sanon 6	Boxscore	Pts: Malovec 19; Rebs: Pavelka 9 Asts: Krajčovič 4	Arena: Olympic Sports Centre; Attendance: 500; Referees: Andris Aunkrogers (LAT), Georgios Poursanidis (GRE), Viola Györgyi (NOR)

16 August 2025 2027 FIBA World Cup pre-qualifiers – 2nd round	Ukraine	73–64	Switzerland	Riga, Latvia
17:00 (UTC+3)	Scoring by quarter: 28–12, 13–19, 21–24, 11–9
	Pts: Sanon 15; Rebs: Lypovyy 6 Asts: Sanon 5	Boxscore	Pts: three players 11; Rebs: N. Ročak 10; Asts: five players 2	Arena: Olympic Sports Centre; Attendance: 600; Referees: Gvidas Gedvilas (LTU), Petar Pešić (SRB), Blaž Zupančič (SVN)

20 August 2025 2027 FIBA World Cup pre-qualifiers – 2nd round	Slovakia	86–98	Ukraine	Bratislava, Slovakia
18:00 (UTC+2)	Scoring by quarter: 20–17, 20–32, 27–20, 19–29
	Pts: Malovec 28; Rebs: Pavelka 9 Asts: Krajčovič 9	Boxscore	Pts: Kovliar 33; Rebs: Lypovyy 8 Asts: Kovliar 6	Arena: Gopass Arena; Attendance: 2,376; Referees: Marius Ciulin (ROU), Péter Praksch (HUN), Siniša Prpa (SRB)

27 November 2025 2027 FIBA World Cup qualifiers – 1st round	Georgia	79–92	Ukraine	Tbilisi, Georgia
21:00 (UTC+4)	Scoring by quarter: 20–17, 20–32, 27–20, 19–29
	Pts: D. Sanadze 22; Rebs: Shengelia, Shermadini 6 Asts: Andronikashvili 5	Boxscore	Pts: Kovliar 31; Rebs: Bobrov 15; Asts: Kovliar 6	Arena: Tbilisi Arena; Attendance: 9,000; Referees: Mihkel Männiste (EST), Çisil Güngör (ROU), Orhan Çağrı Hekimoğlu (TUR)

30 November 2025 2027 FIBA World Cup qualifiers – 1st round	Ukraine	88–71	Denmark	Riga, Latvia
19:00 (UTC+2)	Scoring by quarter: 18–20, 28–16, 27–10, 15–25
	Pts: Kovliar 28; Rebs: Bobrov 11; Asts: Kovliar 11	Boxscore	Pts: Erikstrup 21; Rebs: Erikstrup, Larsen 7 Asts: Jensen 10	Arena: Xiaomi Arena; Attendance: 500; Referees: Petar Pešić (SRB), Ilias Kounellis (CYP), Ioannis Tsibouris (GRE)

=== 2026 ===
27 February 2026 2027 FIBA World Cup qualifiers – 1st round	Ukraine	66–86	Spain	Riga, Latvia
15:00 (UTC+2)	Scoring by quarter: 21–17, 12–15, 14–33, 19–21
	Pts: Kovliar 15; Rebs: three players 4 Asts: Zotov 5	Boxscore	Pts: Bassas, Cárdenas 16; Rebs: Almansa 7 Asts: Fernández 5	Arena: Xiaomi Arena; Attendance: 605; Referees: Ademir Zurapović (BIH), Paulo Marques (POR), Edgard Ceccarelli (FRA)

2 March 2026 2027 FIBA World Cup qualifiers – 1st round	Spain	78–64	Ukraine	Oviedo, Spain
20:30 (UTC+1)	Scoring by quarter: 16–9, 12–12, 24–22, 26–21
	Pts: Alonso 12; Rebs: Oriola 8 Asts: Cárdenas 7	Boxscore	Pts: Voinalovych 12; Rebs: Lypovyy, Shelist 5 Asts: Kovliar 5	Arena: Palacio de los Deportes de Oviedo; Attendance: 5,261; Referees: Martin Vulić (CRO), Dariusz Zapolski (POL), Orhan Çağrı Hekimoğlu (TUR)

2 July 2026 2027 FIBA World Cup qualifiers – 1st round	Ukraine	95–76	Georgia	Riga, Latvia
18:30 (UTC+3)	Scoring by quarter: 30–27, 19–14, 26–19, 20–16
	Pts: Mykhailiuk 28; Rebs: Skapintsev 14; Asts: Kovliar 6	Boxscore	Pts: Reed 18; Rebs: Bitadze 8 Asts: Ochkhikidze 4	Arena: Xiaomi Arena; Attendance: 600; Referees: Martin Horozov (BUL), Valentin Oliot (FRA), Siniša Prpa (SRB)

5 July 2026 2027 FIBA World Cup qualifiers – 1st round	Denmark	69–99	Ukraine	Farum, Denmark
15:00 (UTC+2)	Scoring by quarter: 25–22, 12–31, 19–24, 13–22
	Pts: Erichsen 14; Rebs: Erichsen 7 Asts: Heede-Andersen 7	Boxscore	Pts: Mykhailiuk 30; Rebs: Kovliar 7 Asts: Kovliar 8	Arena: Farum Arena; Attendance: 1,317; Referees: Zafer Yılmaz (TUR), Orhan Çağrı Hekimoğlu (TUR), Rainis Värv (EST)

28 August 2026 2027 FIBA World Cup qualifiers – 2nd round	Ukraine	82–76	Greece	Riga, Latvia
19:00 (UTC+3)	Scoring by quarter: 24–19, 16–18, 24–22, 18–17
	Pts: Kovliar 18; Rebs: three players 6 Asts: three players 4	Boxscore	Pts: Calathes 17; Rebs: Mitoglou, Papanikolaou 6 Asts: Calathes 8	Arena: Xiaomi Arena; Attendance: 900; Referees: Boris Krejić (SVN), Péter Praksch (HUN), Ventsislav Velikov (BUL)

31 August 2026 2027 FIBA World Cup qualifiers – 2nd round	Montenegro	89–98	Ukraine	Podgorica, Montenegro
20:30 (UTC+2)	Scoring by quarter: 18–19, 22–27, 22–26, 27–26
	Pts: Ferrell 22; Rebs: Šuškavčević 8 Asts: Kljajić 6	Boxscore	Pts: Mykhailiuk 23; Rebs: Skapintsev 7 Asts: Bobrov, Kovliar 5	Arena: Morača Sports Center; Attendance: 3,447; Referees: Mārtiņš Kozlovskis (LAT), Lorenzo Baldini (ITA), Edgard Ceccarelli (FRA)

26 November 2026 2027 FIBA World Cup qualifiers – 2nd round	Portugal	vs.	Ukraine	Matosinhos, Portugal
19:00 (UTC+0)
		Boxscore		Arena: Centro de Desportos e Congressos de Matosinhos

29 November 2026 2027 FIBA World Cup qualifiers – 2nd round	Ukraine	vs.	Montenegro	Riga, Latvia
18:30 (UTC+2)
		Boxscore		Arena: Xiaomi Arena

=== 2027 ===
26 February 2027 2027 FIBA World Cup qualifiers – 2nd round	Greece	vs.	Ukraine	Greece
--:-- (UTC+2)
		Boxscore

1 March 2027 2027 FIBA World Cup qualifiers – 2nd round	Ukraine	vs.	Portugal	TBD
--:--
		Boxscore

== Team ==
=== Current roster ===
Roster for the 2027 FIBA World Cup Qualifiers matches on 28 and 31 August 2026 against Greece and Montenegro.

Ukraine men's national basketball team roster
Players
Coaches

Pos.	No.	Name	Age – Date of birth	Height	Club	Ctr.
SG	2	Maksym Shulga	24 – 25 June 2002	1.98 m (6 ft 6 in)	Real Madrid	(Spain)
SG	5	Ivan Tkachenko	29 – 23 April 1997	1.97 m (6 ft 6 in)	Zadar	(Croatia)
G/F	6	Oleksandr Kobzystyi	23 – 23 May 2003	1.96 m (6 ft 5 in)	Oregon Ducks	(United States)
PG	7	Denys Lukashov	37 – 30 April 1989	1.87 m (6 ft 2 in)	Rīgas Zeļļi	(Latvia)
SF	10	Svi Mykhailiuk	29 – 10 June 1997	2.01 m (6 ft 7 in)	Utah Jazz	(United States)
F/C	13	Vyacheslav Bobrov	33 – 19 September 1992	2.03 m (6 ft 8 in)	Stal Ostrów	(Poland)
PF	14	Daniil Shelist	22 – 30 August 2003	2.06 m (6 ft 9 in)	Oviedo	(Spain)
PF	15	Rostyslav Novitskyi	25 – 23 October 2000	2.03 m (6 ft 8 in)	Dinamo	(Romania)
PF	17	Andrii Voinalovych	26 – 11 December 1999	2.05 m (6 ft 9 in)	Tauragė	(Lithuania)
PG	19	Yehor Sushkin	20 – 27 May 2006	1.87 m (6 ft 2 in)	Kyiv	(Ukraine)
PG	34	Illya Tyrtyshnyk	27 – 7 September 1998	1.90 m (6 ft 3 in)	Catanzaro	(Italy)
C	44	Dmytro Skapintsev	28 – 12 May 1998	2.16 m (7 ft 1 in)	Coruña	(Spain)
G	50	Oleksandr Kovliar	24 – 26 June 2002	1.91 m (6 ft 3 in)	Budućnost	(Montenegro)

Head coach

- (Latvia) Ainars Bagatskis

Assistant coach(es)

- (Ukraine) Sergiy Gladyr
- (Ukraine) Valerii Plekhanov

Legend

- (C) Team captain
- Club – describes last
  club before the competition
- Age – describes age
  on 28 August 2026

=== Depth chart ===
Pos.	Starting 5	Bench 1	Bench 2
C	Alex Len	Artem Pustovyi	Dmytro Skapintsev
PF	Volodymyr Gerun	Vyacheslav Bobrov
SF	Svi Mykhailiuk	Ivan Tkachenko
SG	Bogdan Bliznyuk	Illya Sydorov
PG	Issuf Sanon	Vitaliy Zotov	Denys Lukashov

=== Notable players ===
Current notable players who have played for the national team:

Players previously called up roster
Players
Coaches

Pos.	No.	Name	Age – Date of birth	Height	Club	Ctr.
G/F		Oleksandr Belikov	33 – 31 May 1992	2.02 m (6 ft 8 in)	Nitra Blue Wings	(Slovakia)
SG		Bogdan Bliznyuk	30 – 31 March 1995	1.98 m (6 ft 6 in)	Kaohsiung Aquas	(Taiwan)
PG		Igor Boyarkin	30 – 13 June 1995	1.80 m (5 ft 11 in)	Free agent
F		Bohdan Bryniuk	22 – 23 August 2003	2.01 m (6 ft 7 in)	Fyllingen	(Norway)
SG		Mykhailo Bublyk	22 – 30 June 2003	1.94 m (6 ft 4 in)	Kyiv	(Ukraine)
C		Volodymyr Gerun	31 – 25 March 1994	2.11 m (6 ft 11 in)	Osaka Evessa	(Japan)
C		Maxim Klitschko	21 – 1 April 2005	2.16 m (7 ft 1 in)	Free agent
G/F		Oleksandr Kolchenko	37 – 20 September 1988	1.95 m (6 ft 5 in)	Adroit	(Singapore)
F		Volodymyr Koniev	36 – 18 June 1989	2.03 m (6 ft 8 in)	Dnipro	(Ukraine)
C		Vladyslav Koreniuk	32 – 8 January 1994	2.10 m (6 ft 11 in)	Amman United	(Jordan)
F/C		Artem Kovalov	28 – 28 November 1997	2.02 m (6 ft 8 in)	Bayreuth	(Germany)
C		Viacheslav Kravtsov	38 – 25 August 1987	2.12 m (6 ft 11 in)	Borneo Hornbills	(Indonesia)
G/F		Pavlo Krutous	33 – 9 April 1992	2.01 m (6 ft 7 in)	Melilla	(Spain)
C		Alex Len	32 – 16 June 1993	2.13 m (7 ft 0 in)	Free agent
SF		Oleksandr Lypovyy	34 – 9 October 1991	1.99 m (6 ft 6 in)	Rapid	(Romania)
G/F		Kyrylo Marchenko	28 – 28 July 1997	1.96 m (6 ft 5 in)	Cherkaski Mavpy	(Ukraine)
SG		Olexandr Mishula	33 – 18 April 1992	1.91 m (6 ft 3 in)	Free agent
PF		Serhii Pavlov	28 – 18 July 1997	2.03 m (6 ft 8 in)	Free agent
F/C		Viacheslav Petrov	31 – 13 August 1994	2.04 m (6 ft 8 in)	Bambitious Nara	(Japan)
C		Artem Pustovyi	33 – 25 June 1992	2.16 m (7 ft 1 in)	Andorra	(Spain)
PG		Issuf Sanon	26 – 30 October 1999	1.94 m (6 ft 4 in)	Śląsk Wrocław	(Poland)
SG		Anatolii Shundel	32 – 5 December 1993	1.92 m (6 ft 4 in)	Ogre	(Latvia)
PG		Illya Sydorov	29 – 4 December 1996	1.82 m (6 ft 0 in)	VEF Rīga	(Latvia)
C		Daniil Sypalo	20 – 16 August 2005	2.11 m (6 ft 11 in)	Dnipro	(Ukraine)
PF		Stanislav Tymofeyenko	36 – 3 June 1989	2.06 m (6 ft 9 in)	Dnipro	(Ukraine)
F/C		Ihor Zaytsev	36 – 11 May 1989	2.10 m (6 ft 11 in)	Free agent
PG		Vitaliy Zotov	28 – 3 March 1997	1.88 m (6 ft 2 in)	Kapfenberg	(Austria)

Legend

- Club – describes current club
- Age – describes age
  on 2 March 2026

== Head coach position ==
- (Ukraine) Zaurbek Khromaev – (1992–1997)
- (Ukraine) Vladislav Pustogarov – (1997–1998)
- (Ukraine) Vladimir Ryzhov – (1998–2000)
- (Ukraine) Gennadi Zaschuk – (2000–2005)
- (Ukraine) Vitaly Lebedintsev – (2006–2007)
- (Ukraine) Valentin Berestnev – (2007)
- (Ukraine) Valentyn Melnychuk – (2008–2009)
- (Ukraine) Vitaliy Cherniy – (2010)
- (United States) Mike Fratello – (2011–2014)
- (Ukraine) Yevgen Murzin – (2015–2019)
- (Latvia) Ainars Bagatskis – (2019–2023)
- (Ukraine) Vitaly Stepanovsky – (2023–2024)
- (Latvia) Ainars Bagatskis – (2025–present)

== Past rosters ==
1997 EuroBasket: finished 13th among 16 teams

4 Oleksandr Okunsky, 5 Grihoriy Khyzhniak, 6 Leonid Yaylo, 7 Ihor Molchanov, 8 Victor Savchenko, 9 Alexander Lokhmanchuk, 10 Denis Zhuravlov, 11 Roman Rubchenko, 12 Vadym Pudzyrey, 13 Yevheniy Murzin, 14 Dmytro Bazelevsky, 15 Ihor Kharchenko (Coach: Zaurbek Khromaev)

2001 EuroBasket: finished 14th among 16 teams

4 Andriy Lebedev, 5 Vadym Pudzyrey, 6 Viktor Kobzystyy, 7 Stanislav Balashov, 8 Viacheslav Ievstratenko, 9 Serhiy Lishchuk, 10 Nikolay Khryapa, 11 Oleksandr Okunsky, 12 Dmytro Markov, 13 Dmytro Korablov, 14 Oleksandr Rayevskyy, 15 Volodymyr Ryzhov (Coach: Gennadi Zaschuk)

2003 EuroBasket: finished 14th among 16 teams

4 Andrii Lebediev, 5 Oleksandr Rayevskyy, 6 Oleksandr Skutelnyk, 7 Stanislav Balashov, 8 Artur Drozdov, 9 Sergiy Moskalenko, 10 Nikolay Khryapa, 11 Oleksandr Okunsky, 12 Viacheslav Ievstratenko, 13 Alexander Lokhmanchuk, 14 Andriy Botichev, 15 Grigorij Khizhnyak (Coach: Gennadi Zaschuk)

2005 EuroBasket: finished 16th among 16 teams

4 Andrii Lebediev, 5 Artem Butskyy, 6 Viktor Kobzystyy, 7 Stanislav Balashov, 8 Igor Kryvych, 9 Volodymyr Koval, 10 Oleksandr Rayevskyy, 11 Rostyslav Kryvych, 12 Serhiy Lishchuk, 13 Oleksiy Pecherov, 14 Volodymyr Gurtovyy, 15 Slava Medvedenko (Coach: Gennadi Zaschuk)

2011 EuroBasket: finished 17th among 24 teams

4 Maksym Pustozvonov, 5 Denys Lukashov, 6 Steve Burtt Jr., 7 Oleksandr Kolchenko, 8 Oleksandr Lypovyy, 9 Dmytro Zabirchenko, 10 Oleg Saltovets, 11 Oleksiy Pecherov, 12 Serhiy Lishchuk, 13 Danylo Kozlov, 14 Kyrylo Fesenko, 15 Viacheslav Kravtsov (Coach: Mike Fratello)

2013 EuroBasket: finished 6th among 24 teams

4 Maksym Pustozvonov, 5 Eugene Jeter, 6 Olexandr Mishula, 7 Dmytro Gliebov, 8 Sergiy Gladyr, 9 Oleksandr Lypovyy, 10 Kyrylo Natyazhko, 11 Dmytro Zabirchenko, 12 Maxym Korniyenko, 13 Ihor Zaytsev, 14 Artem Pustovyi, 15 Viacheslav Kravtsov (Coach: Mike Fratello)

2014 FIBA World Cup: finished 18th among 24 teams

4 Maksym Pustozvonov, 5 Eugene Jeter, 6 Olexandr Mishula, 7 Svi Mykhailiuk, 8 Sergiy Gladyr, 9 Oleksandr Lypovyy, 10 Kyrylo Natyazhko, 11 Dmytro Zabirchenko, 12 Maksym Korniyenko, 13 Ihor Zaytsev, 14 Artem Pustovyi, 15 Viacheslav Kravtsov (Coach: Mike Fratello)

2015 EuroBasket: finished 22nd among 24 teams

4 Maksym Pustozvonov, 5 Jerome Randle, 6 Olexandr Mishula, 7 Denys Lukashov, 8 Kyrylo Fesenko (C), 9 Oleksandr Sizov, 10 Stanislav Tymofeyenko, 11 Oleksandr Lypovyy, 12 Maksym Korniyenko, 13 Ihor Zaytsev, 14 Artem Pustovyi, 15 Pavlo Krutous (Coach: Yevgen Murzin)

2017 EuroBasket: finished 15th among 24 teams

4 Maksym Pustozvonov, 5 Oleksandr Kolchenko, 7 Denys Lukashov, 9 Ruslan Otverchenko, 11 Oleksandr Lypovyy, 12 Maksym Korniyenko, 13 Vyacheslav Bobrov, 14 Ihor Zaytsev, 15 Viacheslav Kravtsov, 23 Artem Pustovyi, 24 Vladimir Konev, 31 Olexandr Mishula (Coach: Yevgen Murzin)

2022 EuroBasket: finished 12th among 24 teams

5 Ivan Tkachenko, 7 Denys Lukashov, 10 Svi Mykhailiuk, 13 Vyacheslav Bobrov, 23 Artem Pustovyi, 25 Alex Len, 30 Issuf Sanon,
32 Bohdan Blyzniuk, 44 Dmytro Skapintsev, 45 Vitaliy Zotov, 52 Volodymyr Gerun, 55 Illya Sydorov (Coach: Ainars Bagatskis)

== See also ==
- Sport in Ukraine
- Ukraine women's national basketball team
- Ukraine men's national under-20 basketball team
- Ukraine men's national under-18 basketball team
- Ukraine men's national under-16 basketball team
- Ukraine men's national 3x3 team
