= Artem Pustovyi =

Ukrainian basketball player (born 1992)

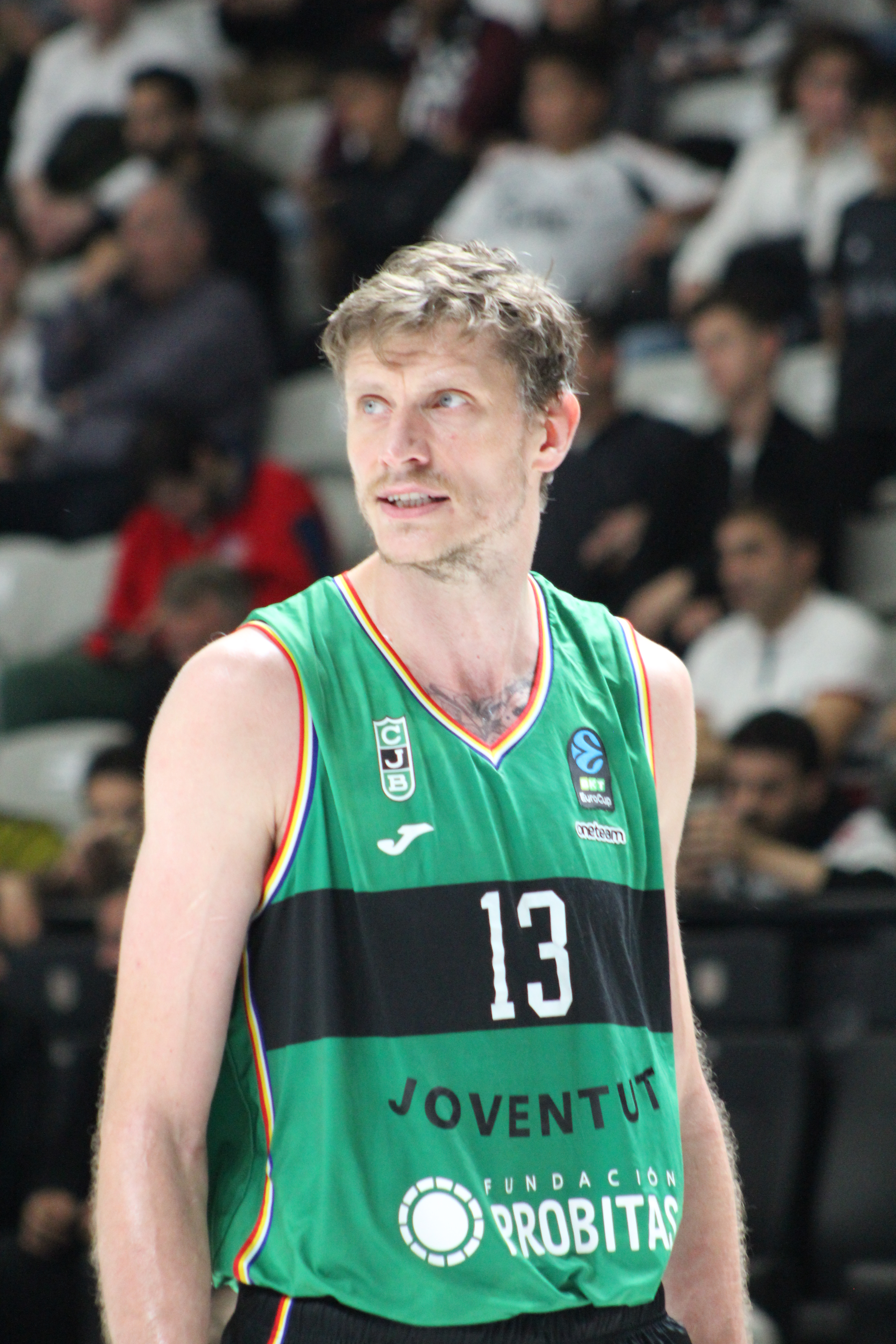
- Pustovyi playing for Joventut in 2024

No. 13 – BC Andorra
- Position: Center
- League: Liga ACB

Personal information
- Born: June 25, 1992 (age 34) Kherson, Ukraine
- Listed height: 218 cm (7 ft 2 in)
- Listed weight: 98 kg (216 lb)

Career information
- NBA draft: 2014: undrafted
- Playing career: 2009–present

Career history
- 2009–2015: BC Khimik
- 2015–2018: Obradoiro CAB
- 2018–2021: FC Barcelona
- 2021–2022: Gran Canaria
- 2022–2023: UCAM Murcia
- 2023–2024: Obradoiro CAB
- 2024: Satria Muda Pertamina
- 2024–2025: Joventut Badalona
- 2025: Satria Muda Pertamina
- 2025–present: BC Andorra

Career highlights
- Liga ACB champion (2021); Ukrainian Basketball SuperLeague champion (2015)

Artem Pustovyi (Ukrainian: Артем Пустовий; born June 25, 1992) is a Ukrainian professional basketball player for BC Andorra of the Liga ACB. He also represents the Ukrainian national team.

== Professional career ==
=== Ukraine ===
Pustovyi started his professional basketball career for BC Khimik (Pivdenne, Ukraine) in 2009.

In season 2014-15 of the Ukrainian Basketball Superleague he averaged 10.5 points and 4.8 rebounds per game and BC Khimik won the championship. Despite such success, Pustovyi decided to leave the SuperLeague of Ukraine and continue his professional basketball career abroad.

=== Spain ===
On June 18, 2015 he signed with Spanish club Obradoiro CAB of the Liga ACB.

In 28 games of the Liga ACB in season 2015-16 Ukrainian center averaged 3.9 points and 2.6 rebounds per game.

The next 2016-17 season Pustovyi significantly improved his skills. In 31 games for Obradoiro CAB of the Spanish Basketball League he averaged 9.5 points and 3.4 rebounds per game.

After that season he made a decision to extend the contract with the Spanish club.

On July 2, 2021, he has signed with Herbalife Gran Canaria of the Spanish Liga ACB.

On July 8, 2022, Gran Canaria released Pustovyi.

On July 17, 2022, he has signed with UCAM Murcia in the Spanish league.

On July 18, 2023, he signed with Monbus Obradoiro of the Spanish Liga ACB.

=== Indonesia ===
On June 6, 2024, he signed with Satria Muda Pertamina of the Indonesian Basketball League (IBL), replacing Jarred Shaw. In June 2025, Pustovyi joined Satria Muda Pertamina again to take part in the 2025 IBL Indonesia with the Indonesian team.

=== Return to Spain ===
In the later summer of 2024, Pustovyi signed with Joventut Badalona for the upcoming season in the Spanish Liga ACB and the EuroCup Basketball.

In July 2025, Pustovyi signed with MoraBanc Andorra for the 2025–26 season in the Spanish Liga ACB, signing a contract for two seasons.

== National team career ==
Pustovyi played for Ukraine's Under-20 team during the FIBA Europe U-20 Championship in 2011 and 2012.

In 2011 he averaged 9.4 points and 2.8 rebounds per game and in 2012 it was 14.9 points and 6 rebounds per game.

His debut for the Ukraine national basketball team was in 2013 at the EuroBasket 2013 in Slovenia. He also played at EuroBasket 2015, 2014 FIBA Basketball World Cup. and EuroBasket 2017.

The most successful performance for the national team of Ukraine at this time is considered to be his play at the European Basketball Championship 2017. Pustovyi averaged 22.5 minutes on the court with 15.3 points and 6.5 rebounds per game. He ranks 9th place in the Efficiency rating among all players of EuroBasket 2017 and 5th place among the centers.
