= Olexandr Mishula =

Ukrainian basketball player

Olexandr Mishula Олександр Мішула
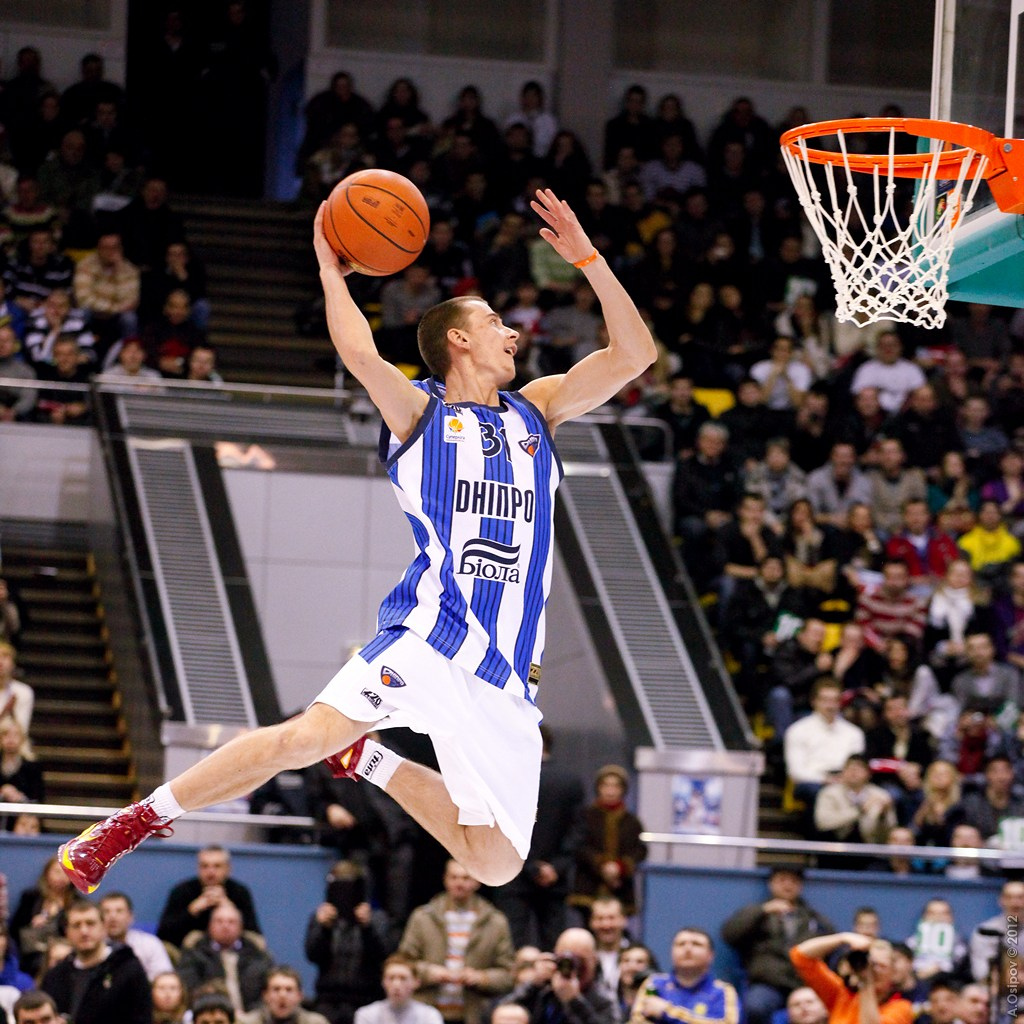
- Mishula with Dnipro in 2012

Free agent
- Position: Point guard

Personal information
- Born: April 18, 1992 (age 34) Dnipropetrovsk, Ukraine
- Listed height: 6 ft 6 in (1.98 m)
- Listed weight: 162 lb (73 kg)

Career information
- NBA draft: 2014: undrafted
- Playing career: 2009–present

Career history
- 2009–2019: Dnipro
- 2019–2020: Merkezefendi Bld. Denizli Basket
- 2020–2021: Kyiv-Basket
- 2021: Prometey
- 2021–2022: Basket Brno
- 2023: Keravnos
- 2023–2024: Zalakerámia ZTE
- 2024: Mersin MSK
- 2024: Dnipro
- 2025: Resovia Rzeszów

Olexandr Mishula (Ukrainian: Олександр Мішула, born April 18, 1992) is a Ukrainian basketball player who most recently played for Keravnos of the Cyprus Basketball Division A. He also represents the Ukrainian national basketball team. Standing at 1.98 m (6 ft 6 in), he plays the guard position.

== International career ==
Mishula was a member of the Ukrainian national basketball team at the 2014 FIBA Basketball World Cup.
