= Käte Hamburger =

Germanist, literary scholar and philosopher

Käte Hamburger (21 September 1896 in Hamburg – 8 April 1992 in Stuttgart) was a Germanist, literary scholar and philosopher. She was a professor at the University of Stuttgart.

Hamburger earned her doctorate in 1922 in Munich. Expelled by the Nazis because of her Jewish heritage, she immigrated to Sweden in 1934, where she lived until 1956, earning her living as a language teacher, journalist and writer. She resumed her university career on her return to Germany, writing about Thomas Mann and Rainer Maria Rilke, among others.

Her examination of the ontological status of literary objects in Die Logik der Dichtung (1957; translated into English as The Logic of Literature, 1973) established her renown in the field of literary theory. Along with Eberhard Lämmert and Franz Karl Stanzel, Hamburger contributed in the 1950s to a reorientation of Germanistics in Germany in the direction of a rational and analytic methodology.

== Literature ==
- Käte Hamburger: Die Logik der Dichtung, Stuttgart 1994. Fourth edition, ISBN 3-608-91681-4. First published 1957. English translation by Marilynn J. Rose, The Logic of Literature, 2nd rev. ed., Bloomington, Indiana University Press, 1973.
- Käte Hamburger: Wahrheit und ästhetische Wahrheit, Stuttgart 1979, ISBN 3-12-933230-8
- Käte Hamburger: Das Mitleid, Stuttgart 1985, ISBN 3-608-91392-0
- Querelles. Jahrbuch für Frauen- und Geschlechterforschung, vol. 8, Johanna Bossinade and Angelika Schaser (Hg.): Käte Hamburger. Zur Aktualität einer Klassikerin, Göttingen 2003, ISBN 3-89244-650-4
