= Kyryl Natyazhko =

Ukrainian basketball player

No. 15 – BC Dnipro
- Position: Center
- League: USL

Personal information
- Born: 30 November 1990 (age 35) Dnipropetrovsk, Ukraine
- Listed height: 2.10 m (6 ft 11 in)
- Listed weight: 123 kg (271 lb)

Career information
- High school: IMG Academy (Bradenton, Florida)
- College: Arizona (2009–2012)
- NBA draft: 2012: undrafted
- Playing career: 2012–present

Career history
- 2012–2014: Azovmash
- 2014–2015: Lietuvos rytas
- 2015: Turów Zgorzelec
- 2015: Szolnoki Olaj
- 2015–2016: Astana
- 2018–present: Dnipro

Kyryl Natyazhko (born 30 November 1990) is a Ukrainian professional basketball player for Dnipro OF THE USL. He also represents the Ukrainian national team, where he participated at the 2014 FIBA Basketball World Cup.

== High school ==
Ranked as the No. 75 overall prospect in the country and the No. 9 center by rivals.com. Averaged 21.0 points and 9.0 rebounds per game as a senior for coach Vince Walden at IMG Academy in Bradenton, Fla. ... Posted per game averages of 16.0 points and 11.0 rebounds as a junior. Competed in the 2009 Wazzo Sports Derby Festival Classic in Louisville, Ky., scoring eight points on 4-of-8 shooting, as his gold team posted a 151-145 victory. Earned highest achievement accolades in physics.

== Career ==
Natyazhko played college basketball at the University of Arizona, with the Arizona Wildcats. After going undrafted at the 2012 NBA draft, he returned to Ukraine and signed a 2+1 deal with Azovmash.

On 21 June 2014, he signed with Lietuvos rytas of Lithuania. On 27 February 2015, he left Rytas and signed with Turów Zgorzelec of Poland for the rest of the season.

On 12 September 2015, he signed with Szolnoki Olaj of Hungary. On 11 December 2015, he parted ways with Szolnoki after appearing in five league games and nine Eurocup games. The next day, he signed with Astana of Kazakhstan.
