= Gary Smith (cricketer) =

South African cricketer (born 1958)

Personal information
- Born: 12 August 1958 (age 68); Queenstown, South Africa
- Source: Cricinfo, 12 December 2020

Gary Smith (born 12 August 1958) is a South African former cricketer. He played in nine first-class matches from 1979/80 to 1982/83.
