= Viacheslav Kravtsov =

Ukrainian basketball player

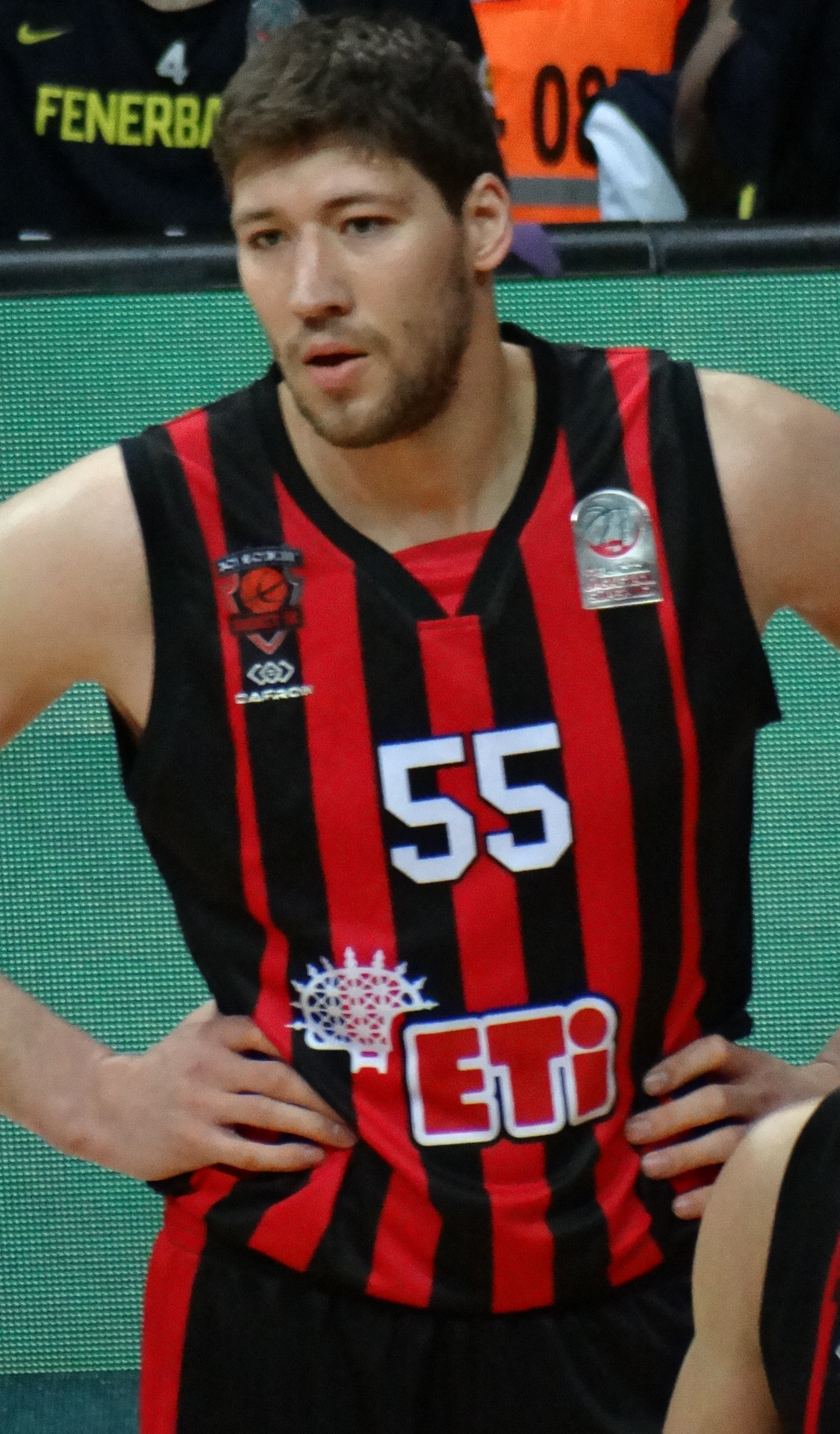
- Kravtsov with Eskişehir Basket in 2018

Free agent
- Position: Center

Personal information
- Born: 25 August 1987 (age 39) Odesa, Ukrainian SSR, Soviet Union
- Listed height: 7 ft 0 in (2.13 m)
- Listed weight: 255 lb (116 kg)

Career information
- NBA draft: 2009: undrafted
- Playing career: 2005–present

Career history
- 2005–2010: Kyiv
- 2010–2012: Donetsk
- 2012–2013: Detroit Pistons
- 2013–2014: Phoenix Suns
- 2014–2015: Foshan Long Lions
- 2015: CSKA Moscow
- 2016: Zaragoza
- 2016–2017: Valencia
- 2017–2018: Eskişehir
- 2018: Burgos
- 2018–2019: Fuenlabrada
- 2019–2020: San-en NeoPhoenix
- 2020–2022: Dnipro
- 2022: Menorca
- 2022–2023: Kaohsiung Steelers
- 2025: Borneo Hornbills

Career highlights
- Liga ACB champion (2017); 4× Ukrainian Superleague All-Star (2009–2012); EuroBasket blocks leader (2013)
- Stats at NBA.com
- Stats at Basketball Reference

Viacheslav "Slava" Kravtsov (Ukrainian: В’ячеслав Кравцов; born 25 August 1987) is a Ukrainian professional basketball player who last played for the Borneo Hornbills of the Indonesian Basketball League (IBL). He also represents the Ukrainian national basketball team.

== Professional career ==
Kravtsov played in the Ukrainian basketball league for BC Kyiv from 2005 to 2010. Kravtsov declared for the 2009 NBA draft, but after not being selected by a team, he returned to Kyiv to play one additional season. In July 2010, he joined the Boston Celtics for the 2010 NBA Summer League. He then joined BC Donetsk, for which he played from 2010 to 2012.

On 14 July 2012, Kravtsov signed with the Detroit Pistons.

On 31 July 2013, Kravtsov was traded, along with Brandon Knight and Khris Middleton, to the Milwaukee Bucks in exchange for guard Brandon Jennings. On 29 August 2013, Kravtsov and Ish Smith were traded to the Phoenix Suns in exchange for Caron Butler. On 1 March 2014, he was waived by the Suns.

On 16 September 2014, he signed with the Foshan Dralions of China for the 2014–15 CBA season.

In July 2015, he joined the Milwaukee Bucks for the 2015 Las Vegas Summer League. On 30 September 2015, Kravtsov signed a short-term contract with CSKA Moscow, in order to replace injured Joel Freeland. On 26 December 2015, he signed with the Spanish club CAI Zaragoza for the rest of the season. He averaged 11.1 points and 6.5 rebounds at the Eurocup and 8.4 points and 5.4 rebounds at the Liga ACB.

He came back to Spain on 18 October 2016 to sign with Valencia Basket. On 30 June 2017, Valencia announced that they did not renew their contract with Kravtsov.

On 22 July 2017, Kravtsov signed with Turkish club Eskişehir Basket for the 2017–18 season. On 19 July 2018, Kravtsov signed a one-year deal with San Pablo Burgos of the Liga ACB. He spent the 2019–20 season in Japan with San-en NeoPhoenix, averaging 13.8 points and 7.5 rebounds per game. On September 3, 2020, Kravtsov signed with Dnipro of the Ukrainian Basketball SuperLeague.

== Career statistics ==
Legend
| GP | Games played | GS | Games started | MPG | Minutes per game |
| FG% | Field goal percentage | 3P% | 3-point field goal percentage | FT% | Free throw percentage |
| RPG | Rebounds per game | APG | Assists per game | SPG | Steals per game |
| BPG | Blocks per game | PPG | Points per game | **Bold** | Career high |

=== NBA ===
==== Regular season ====
| Year | Team | GP | GS | MPG | FG% | 3P% | FT% | RPG | APG | SPG | BPG | PPG |
|---|---|---|---|---|---|---|---|---|---|---|---|---|
| 2012–13 | Detroit | **25** | 0 | **9.0** | **.717** | .000 | .297 | **1.8** | **.4** | **.2** | **.4** | **3.1** |
| 2013–14 | Phoenix | 20 | 0 | 3.0 | .513 | .000 | **.500** | .9 | .1 | .0 | .1 | 1.0 |
| Career | | 45 | 0 | 6.3 | .672 | .000 | .333 | 1.4 | .2 | .1 | .2 | 2.2 |

== International career ==
In 2013, Kravtsov helped the Ukrainian national basketball team qualify for their first FIBA World Cup since the break-up of the Soviet Union by leading everyone in the 2013 EuroBasket tournament in blocks made with an average of two blocks per game. At the 2014 FIBA World Cup, he averaged 7.4 points and 5.6 rebounds per game.
