= Gary T. Smith =

American film director

- Born: Gary Thomas Smith; October 30, 1954 (age 70); Atlanta, Georgia, US
- Occupation(s): Screenwriter, actor, and film and television director
- Years active: 1971–73, 1976–78, 1980–present
- Spouse: Vicki G. Smith (1976–present)
- Website: garytsmith.com

Gary T. Smith (born October 30, 1954) is an American screenwriter, actor, and film and television director. A native of Atlanta, Georgia, he is descended from a long line of Georgians, dating back before the Civil War. His father was an executive in the baking industry and his mother was a housewife. He has drawn on this heritage as inspiration for his films.

== Early career ==
Smith's career began in 1971 at WHAE-TV in Atlanta, while he was a high school student. The station was owned and operated by Pat Robertson's Christian Broadcasting Network. After a stint as station courier and film department assistant, he moved to the studio where he began to learn the skills that he later used to develop his own productions.

In the mid-70s, he relocated to Virginia where he worked at CBN's headquarters' station, running camera for the network's flagship program The 700 Club. On April 29, 1977, he participated in the inaugural broadcast of the CBN Satellite Service which is now Freeform.

In the 1980s, Smith directed The Breakfast Club, a live daily talk show in Atlanta (which also aired weekly on the defunct PTL Satellite Network), as well as studio segments for MotoWorld, seen on The Nashville Network. He was awarded an Area Emmy by the Atlanta Chapter of the National Academy of Television Arts and Sciences for work on the documentary Zoo Atlanta: The World's Next Great Zoo, in July 1987.

In the 1990s he co-developed and directed the television series Prep Sports + for Georgia Public Television, and he directed the internationally broadcast program Praise the Lord for the Trinity Broadcasting Network.

== Recent career ==
January 2010 the narrative short film The Mailbox, which he wrote, directed and acted in, premiered at Atlanta's Landmark Art Cinema and won a Redemptive Film Festival Redemptive Storyteller Award. A tag-line for the movie was "A young boy learns the meaning of the old saying 'You only get to keep what you give away.'" Smith described the film as "sort-of a parable".

The majority of the story takes place in rural Georgia during 1947 and centers on a family's mailbox, which the mother paints a bright yellow. The yellow mailbox is the origin of the name for Smith's own film production company, Yellow Post Pictures.

In March 2012, Triple Horse Studios (which had announced plans to "build a Hollywood-style film studio in Covington, [GA], ultimately investing $100 million, with the goal of solidifying Covington's position as the 'Hollywood of the South.'") concluded a deal with Smith to co-produce The Engagement Ring, a feature-length movie that he wrote and was slated to direct. A romantic comedy, the story takes place on the campus of fictional Mountainview College in north Georgia.

Smith had a commitment to movies set and filmed in his home state. He planned to shoot The Engagement Ring entirely in Georgia. Smith also had several more movie projects in various stages of development, including Trouble in the Plate (a suspense comedy) scheduled for release in summer, 2014; and First Georgia Blue, a Civil War drama which he hoped to release as part of the sesquicentennial commemoration of the conflict.

== Personal life ==
In 1976, Smith married Vicki Irene Greer. The idea of the yellow mailbox (seen in the film The Mailbox and the origin of the name Yellow Post Pictures) derived from the Greer family mailbox, which Vicki painted yellow and which was yellow while they were dating. The couple has 3 children.

Smith is a graduate of Mercer University in Atlanta (BA in Religion, 1979), Master's International School of Divinity (MMin, 2012), and Regent University (MA in Cinema and television, 2013). He was ordained a Southern Baptist minister in 1993 and is a commissioned officer in the Georgia State Defense Force.

== Selected filmography ==
Year	Production	Writer	Director	Actor/Talent	Role
Announced	The Engagement Ring (feature)	X	X	X	Coach Barnett
2014	Trouble in the Plate (feature)	X	X	X	LT Reily
2010	The Mailbox (short)	X	X	X	Uncle Billy
2007	Searching for Church (documentary short)	X	X	X	Host
1998	Atlanta Passion Play: 2nd Edition (video)			X	Nicodemus
1994	Praise the Lord (TV series)		X	X	Himself
1992	Prep Sports + (TV series)	X	X	X	Himself (voice)
1988	MotoWorld (TV series)		X (studio segs)		
1985	Fisherman (video)	X	X		
1985	The Breakfast Club (TV series)		X		
