= Gary Smith (philosopher) =

American philosopher and culture manager (born 1954)

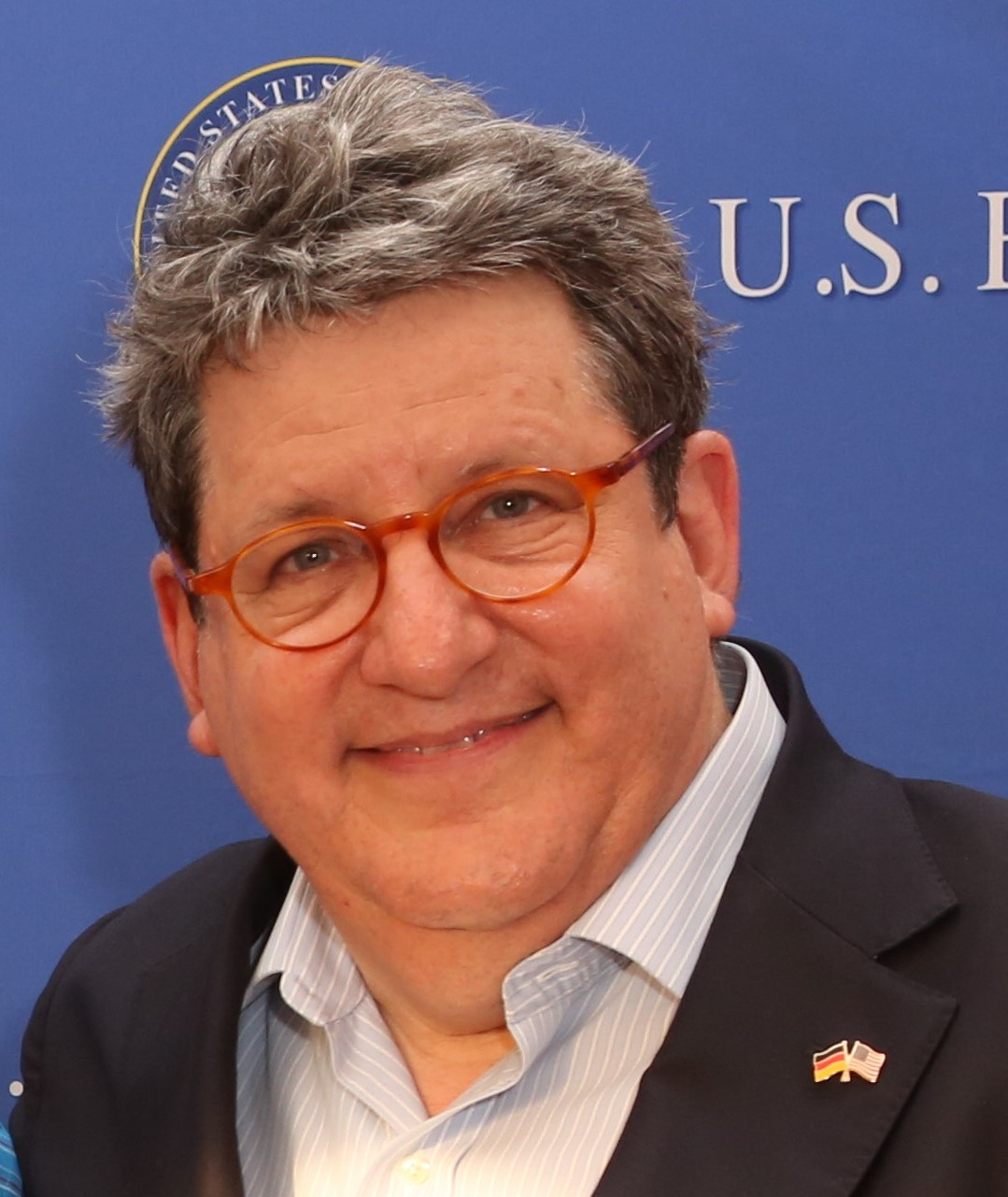
Gary Smith in 2014

Gary Smith (born July 26, 1954 in New Orleans) is an American philosopher and culture manager.

== Early life and education ==
Smith grew up in Austin, Texas. After graduating from high school in 1972, he went on to study philosophy and German in Houston and Boston as well as in Frankfurt as a DAAD scholarship recipient. After completing a dissertation on Walter Benjamin, Smith earned his doctorate in 1989 from Boston University.

== Career ==
Between 1986 and 1992, Smith had teaching positions in Boston, Chicago, and Potsdam, Germany, as well as at the Berlin University, where he lectured on Jewish studies and philosophy. From 1992 to 1998, he led the Einstein Forum in Potsdam.

From 1997 until 2014, Smith was the Executive Director of the American Academy in Berlin. His academic publications include: Benjaminiana. Eine biographische Recherche, with Hans-Georg Puttnies; Gershom Scholem. Zwischen den Disziplinen; Amnestie, oder die Politik der Erinnerung in der Demokratie, with Avishai Margalit; Wissenbilder. Strategien der Überlieferung, with Ulrich Raullf; Hannah Arendt Revisited: Eichmann in Jerusalem.

Since 2016, Smith has been a member of the so-called Limbach Commission (Advisory Commission on the return of cultural property seized as a result of Nazi persecution, especially Jewish property), a panel convened by the German government to give recommendations on restitution claims regarding art works stolen or purchased under duress by the Nazis.

== Recognition ==
For his dedication to the building of networks in knowledge and cultural exchange on the national and international levels, he earned the Cross of the Order of Merit of the Federal Republic of Germany in 2002. In 2011, the city of Berlin thanked Smith for his cultural and scholarly development of the German-American friendship and the contributions to the city with intellectual, challenging, and outstanding events with the Order of Merit of Berlin.

== Personal life ==
Smith is in his second marriage to the daughter of the former Berlin Mayor, Klaus Schütz. He has a son from his first marriage and a son as well as twin daughters from his second marriage.
