= Rīgas Laiks =

Latvian monthly magazine

Rigas Laiks
- Cover of Rigas Laiks
- Editor-in-Chief: Uldis Tīrons
- Editors: Valdis Ābols
- Frequency: 12/year (Latvian), 4/year (Russian)
- Publisher: SIA "Rīgas Laiks"
- Founded: 1993
- Country: Latvia
- Based in: Riga
- Language: Latvian (monthly), Russian (quarterly)
- Website: www.rigaslaiks.lv
- ISSN: 1407-1622
- OCLC: 30721387

Rigas Laiks (The Riga Time) is a Latvian monthly magazine published in Riga, Latvia.

== History and profile ==
Rigas Laiks was established in 1993 and its headquarters is in Riga, Latvia. Rigas Laiks is a magazine for which it is highly regarded for the depth of insight in its topics, the elaborate literary style, and for its in-depth interviews with original or well-known international personalities: scientists, politicians, philosophers, historians, writers, musicians, actors, including Nobel Prize winners.

In 2012, the Russian version of Rigas Laiks Русское издание was launched and it is published quarterly.

Rigas Laiks publishes articles, essays, commentaries and interviews on international and local culture, politics, society, philosophy, history, art, literature, film, architecture and science. Among its regular contributors are Uldis Tīrons, Arnis Rītups, Agnese Gaile-Irbe, Dāvis Sīmanis, Tabita Sīmane, Daniela Zacmane, Ivars Ījabs, Kaspars Eihmanis, Ieva Lešinska, Viktors Freibergs, Ilmārs Šlāpins, Ilmārs Zvirgzds, Artis Svece, Juris Lorencs, Pauls Bankovskis, Valdis Ābols, Mārtiņš Vanags, Maira Dobele, Kirils Kobrins (Кирилл Рафаилович Кобрин). A Russian philosopher, scholar of South Asian philosophy and culture, historian, philologist, semiotician, and writer Alexander Piatigorsky (Алекса́ндр Моисе́евич Пятиго́рский) was an active contributor to Rigas Laiks until his death.

The editor-in-chief is a philosopher Uldis Tīrons. He is the owner of the magazine jointly with the philosopher and publisher Arnis Rītups.

== Russian edition ==
At the beginning of 2012 Rigas Laiks launched a Russian edition: Rīgas Laiks. Русское издание. Published quarterly it shares the best content with Rigas Laiks monthly editions.
