= EuroBasket 2013 final =

EuroBasket 2013 Final
- Event: EuroBasket 2013
France	Lithuania
(France)	(Lithuania)
80	66
	1	2	3	4	Total
France	19	31	18	12	80
Lithuania	22	12	16	16	66
- Date: 22 September 2013
- Venue: Arena Stožice, Ljubljana
- Referees: Luigi Lamonica; Juan Arteaga; Ilija Belošević
- Attendance: 10,000

The EuroBasket 2013 Final was the championship game of EuroBasket 2013. The game was played at the Arena Stožice in Ljubljana, Slovenia on 22 September between France and Lithuania. France won their first ever European title by winning the match 80–66.

== Road to the Final ==
=== All results ===
France		Round	Lithuania	
Opponent	Result		Opponent	Result
Germany	74–80	Game 1	Serbia	56–63
Great Britain	88–65	Game 2	North Macedonia	75–67
Israel	82–63	Game 3	Latvia	67–59
Ukraine	77–71	Game 4	Montenegro	77–70 (OT)
Belgium	82–65	Game 5	Bosnia and Herzegovina	72–78
Team / Pld / W / L / PF / PA / PD / Pts / Tie; France / 5 / 4 / 1 / 403 / 344 / +59 / 9 / 1–0; Ukraine / 5 / 4 / 1 / 378 / 352 / +26 / 9 / 0–1; Belgium / 5 / 2 / 3 / 344 / 371 / −27 / 7 / 2–0; Great Britain / 5 / 2 / 3 / 360 / 396 / −36 / 7 / 1–1; Germany / 5 / 2 / 3 / 390 / 396 / −6 / 7 / 0–2; Israel / 5 / 1 / 4 / 364 / 380 / −16 / 6		First round	Team / Pld / W / L / PF / PA / PD / Pts / Tie; Serbia / 5 / 3 / 2 / 371 / 366 / +5 / 8 / 3–0; Latvia / 5 / 3 / 2 / 365 / 360 / +5 / 8 / 1–2, 1–1, 1.021; Lithuania / 5 / 3 / 2 / 347 / 337 / +10 / 8 / 1–2, 1–1, 1.015; Bosnia and Herzegovina / 5 / 3 / 2 / 358 / 359 / −1 / 8 / 1–2, 1–1, 0.968; Montenegro / 5 / 2 / 3 / 376 / 382 / −6 / 7; Macedonia / 5 / 1 / 4 / 356 / 369 / −13 / 6	
Opponent	Result		Opponent	Result
Lithuania	62–76	Game 1	France	76–62
Latvia	102–91	Game 2	Belgium	86–67
Serbia	65–77	Game 3	Ukraine	70–63
Team / Pld / W / L / PF / PA / PD / Pts / Tie; Serbia / 5 / 4 / 1 / 371 / 343 / +28 / 9 / 1–0; Lithuania / 5 / 4 / 1 / 355 / 314 / +41 / 9 / 0–1; France / 5 / 3 / 2 / 388 / 380 / +8 / 8; Ukraine / 5 / 2 / 3 / 325 / 364 / −39 / 7; Belgium / 5 / 1 / 4 / 318 / 358 / −40 / 6 / 1–0; Latvia / 5 / 1 / 4 / 362 / 360 / +2 / 6 / 0–1		Second round	Team / Pld / W / L / PF / PA / PD / Pts / Tie; Serbia / 5 / 4 / 1 / 371 / 343 / +28 / 9 / 1–0; Lithuania / 5 / 4 / 1 / 355 / 314 / +41 / 9 / 0–1; France / 5 / 3 / 2 / 388 / 380 / +8 / 8; Ukraine / 5 / 2 / 3 / 325 / 364 / −39 / 7; Belgium / 5 / 1 / 4 / 318 / 358 / −40 / 6 / 1–0; Latvia / 5 / 1 / 4 / 362 / 360 / +2 / 6 / 0–1	
Opponent	Result		Opponent	Result
Slovenia	72–62	Quarterfinals	Italy	81–77
Spain	75–72 (OT)	Semifinals	Croatia	77–62

=== France ===
France ended in first place in Group A, after it only lost to Germany in its first game. In the Top 16, France finished third in Group E behind Serbia and Lithuania.

In the quarterfinals, France beat Slovenia 72–62. In the semi-finals, the French upset title favorite Spain by winning 72–75 in overtime.

=== Lithuania ===
Lithuania ended in third place in Group B, just making it to the second round due to an advantage in a tie-breaker with Bosnia and Herzegovina. In the top 16, the team went 4–1 and finished second.

In the quarterfinals, Lithuania beat Italy 81–77. In the semi-finals, the Lithuanians beat Croatia 62–77.

== Match details ==
22 September 2013
21:00

Boxscore

France	80–66	Lithuania
Scoring by quarter: 19–22, 31–12, 18–16, 12–16
Pts: Batum 17; Rebs: Ajinça 10; Asts: Diaw 4		Pts: Kleiza 20; Rebs: Mačiulis 6 Asts: three players 2

Arena Stožice, Ljubljana
Attendance: 10,000
Referees: Luigi Lamonica (ITA), Juan Arteaga (ESP), Ilija Belošević (SRB)

France	Lithuania

Starters:			Pts	Reb	Ast
PG	9	Tony Parker	12	2	3
SG	15	Mickaël Gelabale	7	3	2
SF	5	Nicolas Batum	17	6	1
PF	13	Boris Diaw	15	6	4
C	14	Alexis Ajinça	4	10	0
Reserves:					
F	4	Joffrey Lauvergne	2	1	0
G	6	Antoine Diot	5	0	3
C	7	Johan Petro	8	0	1
G/F	8	Charles Lombahe-Kahudi	0	1	0
G	10	Thomas Heurtel	0	0	0
F	11	Florent Piétrus	6	1	0
G	12	Nando de Colo	4	6	2
Head coach:
(French Federation of Basketball) Vincent Collet

Game rules
Game was played under FIBA rules.

Stožice Arena

2013 European champions

France
1st title

Starters:			Pts	Reb	Ast
PG	5	Mantas Kalnietis	19	4	2
SG	10	Renaldas Seibutis	10	1	2
SF	11	Linas Kleiza	20	5	1
SF	8	Jonas Mačiulis	7	6	2
C	7	Darjuš Lavrinovič	7	0	0
Reserves:					
F	4	Donatas Motiejūnas	0	0	0
F	5	Mindaugas Kuzminskas	0	0	1
G	9	Tomas Delininkaitis	DNP		
F/C	12	Kšyštof Lavrinovič	DNP		
G/F	13	Martynas Pocius	3	2	0
C	14	Jonas Valančiūnas	0	3	1
C	15	Robertas Javtokas	0	2	0
Head coach:
(Lithuanian Basketball Federation) Jonas Kazlauskas
