= EuroBasket 2013 Group E =

Group E of the EuroBasket 2013 took place between 11 and 15 September 2013. The group played all of its games at Arena Stožice in Ljubljana, Slovenia.

The group composed of the best three teams from Group A and B. The four best ranked teams advanced to the knockout stage.

== Standings ==
Team	Pld	W	L	PF	PA	PD	Pts	Tie
Serbia	5	4	1	371	343	+28	9	1–0
Lithuania	5	4	1	355	314	+41	9	0–1
France	5	3	2	388	380	+8	8	
Ukraine	5	2	3	325	364	−39	7	
Belgium	5	1	4	318	358	−40	6	1–0
Latvia	5	1	4	362	360	+2	6	0–1

All times are local (UTC+2)

== 11 September ==
=== Latvia vs. Ukraine ===
11 September 2013
14:30

Boxscore

Latvia	85–51	Ukraine
Scoring by quarter: 24–11, 18–11, 23–10, 20–19
Pts: Janičenoks 14; Rebs: Meiers 10; Asts: Bertāns 7		Pts: Gladyr 12; Rebs: Kravtsov 6 Asts: Mishula 4

Arena Stožice, Ljubljana
Attendance: 2,740
Referees: Juan Arteaga (ESP), Srđan Dozai (CRO), Elias Koromilas (GRE)

=== Belgium vs. Serbia ===
11 September 2013
17:45

Boxscore

Belgium	69–76	Serbia
Scoring by quarter: 18–19, 18–21, 15–14, 18–22
Pts: Mukubu 16; Rebs: Hervelle 9 Asts: Tabu, Mukubu 3		Pts: Nen. Krstić 17; Rebs: Bjelica 8 Asts: Nen. Krstić 5

Arena Stožice, Ljubljana
Attendance: 3,650
Referees: Luigi Lamonica (ITA), Christos Christodoulou (GRE), Vicente Bulto (ESP)

=== Lithuania vs. France ===
11 September 2013
21:00

Boxscore

Lithuania	76–62	France
Scoring by quarter: 16–10, 16–17, 19–15, 25–20
Pts: Seibutis 15; Rebs: Kleiza 7 Asts: Kalnietis 7		Pts: de Colo 12; Rebs: Batum, Ajinça 6 Asts: Diaw 6

Arena Stožice, Ljubljana
Attendance: 3,880
Referees: Sreten Radović (CRO), Guerrino Cerebuch (ITA), Damir Javor (SLO)

== 13 September ==
=== Lithuania vs. Belgium ===
13 September 2013
14:30

Boxscore

Lithuania	86–67	Belgium
Scoring by quarter: 18–12, 26–9, 25–14, 17–32
Pts: Motiejūnas 13; Rebs: Valančiūnas 10; Asts: Kalnietis 6		Pts: Tabu 15; Rebs: Hervelle 8 Asts: Moors 5

Arena Stožice, Ljubljana
Attendance: 2,980
Referees: Luigi Lamonica (ITA), Srđan Dozai (CRO), Aleksandar Milojević (MKD)

=== Ukraine vs. Serbia ===
13 September 2013
17:45

Boxscore

Ukraine	82–75	Serbia
Scoring by quarter: 18–21, 23–19, 22–14, 19–21
Pts: Korniyenko 21; Rebs: Korniyenko 8 Asts: Jeter 4		Pts: Bjelica 22; Rebs: Bjelica 10; Asts: Marković 6

Arena Stožice, Ljubljana
Attendance: 5,230
Referees: Christos Christodoulou (GRE), Sreten Radović (CRO), Chris Dodds (SCO)

=== France vs. Latvia ===
13 September 2013
21:00

Boxscore

France	102–91	Latvia
Scoring by quarter: 31–15, 21–20, 24–30, 26–26
Pts: Ajinça 25; Rebs: Batum 10; Asts: Batum 6		Pts: Bertāns 28; Rebs: Šeļakovs 4 Asts: Janičenoks, Šķēle 4

Arena Stožice, Ljubljana
Attendance: 4,420
Referees: Juan Arteaga (ESP), Guerrino Cerebuch (ITA), Rüştü Nuran (TUR)

== 15 September ==
=== Latvia vs. Belgium ===
15 September 2013
14:30

Boxscore

Latvia	56–60	Belgium
Scoring by quarter: 15–14, 17–18, 10–14, 14–14
Pts: Freimanis 10; Rebs: Freimanis 11; Asts: Strēlnieks 4		Pts: Massot 14; Rebs: Tabu 8 Asts: Tabu, Van Rossom 4

Arena Stožice, Ljubljana
Attendance: 3,270
Referees: Christos Christodoulou (GRE), Damir Javor (SLO), Apostolos Kalpakas (SWE)

=== Ukraine vs. Lithuania ===
15 September 2013
17:45

Boxscore

Ukraine	63–70	Lithuania
Scoring by quarter: 13–18, 17–14, 16–16, 17–22
Pts: Gladyr 18; Rebs: Kravtsov 9 Asts: Jeter 8		Pts: Kleiza 15; Rebs: Kuzminskas, Mačiulis 6 Asts: Kalnietis, Seibutis 4

Arena Stožice, Ljubljana
Attendance: 4,400
Referees: Juan Arteaga (ESP), Srđan Dozai (CRO), Elias Koromilas (GRE)

=== Serbia vs. France ===
15 September 2013
21:00

Boxscore

Serbia	77–65	France
Scoring by quarter: 19–17, 19–14, 22–20, 17–14
Pts: Nen. Krstić 19; Rebs: Kalinić 8 Asts: Nen. Krstić 4		Pts: four players 12; Rebs: Batum 7 Asts: Parker 5

Arena Stožice, Ljubljana
Attendance: 4,380
Referees: Luigi Lamonica (ITA), Vicente Bulto (ESP), Rüştü Nuran (TUR)
