= EuroBasket 2013 Group A =

Group A of the EuroBasket 2013 took place between 4 and 9 September 2013. The group played all of its games at the Tivoli Hall in Ljubljana, Slovenia.

The group composed of Belgium, France, Germany, Great Britain, Israel and Ukraine. The three best ranked teams advanced to the second round.

== Standings ==
Team	Pld	W	L	PF	PA	PD	Pts	Tie
France	5	4	1	403	344	+59	9	1–0
Ukraine	5	4	1	378	352	+26	9	0–1
Belgium	5	2	3	344	371	−27	7	2–0
Great Britain	5	2	3	360	396	−36	7	1–1
Germany	5	2	3	390	396	−6	7	0–2
Israel	5	1	4	364	380	−16	6	

All times are local (UTC+2)

== 4 September ==
=== Israel vs. Great Britain ===
4 September 2013
14:30

Boxscore

Israel	71–75 (OT)	Great Britain
Scoring by quarter: 17–22, 13–12, 22–13, 14–19, Overtime: 5–9
Pts: Nissim 17; Rebs: Eliyahu 14; Asts: Ohayon 7		Pts: Johnson 22; Rebs: Achara 13; Asts: Sullivan 2

Tivoli Hall, Ljubljana
Attendance: 750
Referees: Sreten Radović (CRO), Marek Ćmikiewicz (POL), David Berekashvili (GEO)

=== Belgium vs. Ukraine ===
4 September 2013
17:45

Boxscore

Belgium	57–58	Ukraine
Scoring by quarter: 12–11, 24–15, 12–14, 9–18
Pts: Beghin 14; Rebs: Hervelle 9 Asts: Tabu 4		Pts: Zaytsev 16; Rebs: Gladyr 7 Asts: Mishula 4

Tivoli Hall, Ljubljana
Attendance: 740
Referees: Christos Christodoulou (GRE), Vicente Bulto (ESP), Sergey Krug (RUS)

=== France vs. Germany ===
4 September 2013
21:00

Boxscore

France	74–80	Germany
Scoring by quarter: 14–27, 25–16, 17–14, 18–23
Pts: Parker 18; Rebs: Batum 5 Asts: Batum, Diaw 5		Pts: Benzing 19; Rebs: Pleiß 7 Asts: Schaffartzik 11

Tivoli Hall, Ljubljana
Attendance: 2,400
Referees: Luigi Lamonica (ITA), Damir Javor (SLO), Rüştü Nuran (TUR)

== 5 September ==
=== Ukraine vs. Israel ===
5 September 2013
14:30

Boxscore

Ukraine	74–67	Israel
Scoring by quarter: 19–13, 16–13, 18–20, 21–21
Pts: Gladyr 17; Rebs: Kravtsov 8 Asts: Mishula 5		Pts: Nissim 12; Rebs: Eliyahu 5 Asts: Halperin 4

Tivoli Hall, Ljubljana
Attendance: 790
Referees: Christos Christodoulou (GRE), Damir Javor (SLO), David Berekashvili (GEO)

=== Germany vs. Belgium ===
5 September 2013
17:45

Boxscore

Germany	73–77 (OT)	Belgium
Scoring by quarter: 16–14, 10–21, 15–13, 22–15, Overtime: 10–14
Pts: Benzing 24; Rebs: Pleiß 9 Asts: Schaffartzik 7		Pts: Massot, Tabu 15; Rebs: Hervelle 9 Asts: Tabu 5

Tivoli Hall, Ljubljana
Attendance: 1,460
Referees: Sreten Radović (CRO), Vicente Bulto (ESP), Rüştü Nuran (TUR)

=== Great Britain vs. France ===
5 September 2013
21:00

Boxscore

Great Britain	65–88	France
Scoring by quarter: 14–26, 23–19, 11–26, 17–17
Pts: Clark 16; Rebs: Hesson 7 Asts: Van Oostrum 3		Pts: Batum 17; Rebs: Ajinça 11; Asts: Parker 5

Tivoli Hall, Ljubljana
Attendance: 1,200
Referees: Luigi Lamonica (ITA), Petri Mäntylä (FIN), Sergey Krug (RUS)

== 6 September ==
=== Germany vs. Ukraine ===
6 September 2013
14:30

Boxscore

Germany	83–88	Ukraine
Scoring by quarter: 16–15, 14–24, 27–25, 26–24
Pts: Schaffartzik 22; Rebs: Pleiß 11; Asts: Schaffartzik 11		Pts: Gladyr 25; Rebs: Zaytsev 7 Asts: Jeter 6

Tivoli Hall, Ljubljana
Attendance: 1,580
Referees: Sreten Radović (CRO), Petri Mäntylä (FIN), David Berekashvili (GEO)

=== Belgium vs. Great Britain ===
6 September 2013
17:45

Boxscore

Belgium	76–71	Great Britain
Scoring by quarter: 23–19, 10–19, 22–17, 21–16
Pts: Massot 15; Rebs: Hervelle 10; Asts: Van Rossom 5		Pts: Clark 19; Rebs: Clark 9 Asts: Van Oostrum 2

Tivoli Hall, Ljubljana
Attendance: 1,300
Referees: Luigi Lamonica (ITA), Damir Javor (SLO), Sergey Krug (RUS)

=== France vs. Israel ===
6 September 2013
21:00

Boxscore

France	82–63	Israel
Scoring by quarter: 20–14, 18–15, 27–14, 17–20
Pts: Ajinça 13; Rebs: Ajinça 6 Asts: Parker 7		Pts: Eliyahu, Casspi 14; Rebs: Eliyahu 5 Asts: Ohayon 4

Tivoli Hall, Ljubljana
Attendance: 1,990
Referees: Christos Christodoulou (GRE), Vicente Bulto (ESP), Marek Cmkiewicz (POL)

== 8 September ==
=== Great Britain vs. Germany ===
8 September 2013
14:30

Boxscore

Great Britain	81–74	Germany
Scoring by quarter: 16–23, 26–15, 17–18, 22–18
Pts: Lawrence 23; Rebs: Hesson 11; Asts: four players 2		Pts: Pleiß 20; Rebs: Pleiß 14; Asts: Pleiß 3

Tivoli Hall, Ljubljana
Attendance: 1,620
Referees: Christos Christodoulou (GRE), Petri Mäntylä (FIN), Marek Cmikiewicz (POL)

=== Ukraine vs. France ===
8 September 2013
17:45

Boxscore

Ukraine	71–77	France
Scoring by quarter: 16–14, 20–21, 15–16, 20–26
Pts: Jeter 20; Rebs: Natyazhko 10; Asts: three players 2		Pts: Parker 28; Rebs: Ajinça 11; Asts: Batum, Parker 2

Tivoli Hall, Ljubljana
Attendance: 2,200
Referees: Luigi Lamonica (ITA), Vicente Bulto (ESP), Sergey Krug (RUS)

=== Israel vs. Belgium ===
8 September 2013
21:00

Boxscore

Israel	87–69	Belgium
Scoring by quarter: 19–15, 22–18, 32–13, 14–23
Pts: Nissim 23; Rebs: Ohayon 7 Asts: Eliyahu 6		Pts: De Zeeuw 14; Rebs: Hervelle 7 Asts: Van Rossom 5

Tivoli Hall, Ljubljana
Attendance: 1,010
Referees: Sreten Radović (CRO), Damir Javor (SLO), Rüştü Nuran (TUR)

== 9 September ==
=== Great Britain vs. Ukraine ===
9 September 2013
14:30

Boxscore

Great Britain	68–87	Ukraine
Scoring by quarter: 18–21, 13–27, 20–22, 17–17
Pts: Achara, Van Oostrum 12; Rebs: Clark 6 Asts: Van Oostrum 4		Pts: Natyazhko, Zaytsev 11; Rebs: Gladyr 7 Asts: Gladyr, Jeter 4

Tivoli Hall, Ljubljana
Attendance: 1,780
Referees: Christos Christodoulou (GRE), Damir Javor (SLO), Rüştü Nuran (TUR)

=== Germany vs. Israel ===
9 September 2013
17:45

Boxscore

Germany	80–76	Israel
Scoring by quarter: 12–20, 19–10, 22–19, 27–27
Pts: Günther, Staiger 15; Rebs: Pleiß 14; Asts: Schaffartzik 4		Pts: Casspi 22; Rebs: Casspi 13; Asts: Ohayon, Halperin 4

Tivoli Hall, Ljubljana
Attendance: 2,940
Referees: Luigi Lamonica (ITA), Vicente Bulto (ESP), Petri Mäntylä (FIN)

=== Belgium vs. France ===
9 September 2013
21:00

Boxscore

Belgium	65–82	France
Scoring by quarter: 30–19, 16–15, 9–32, 10–16
Pts: Hervelle 13; Rebs: Van Rossom 8 Asts: Mukubu 4		Pts: Parker 20; Rebs: Ajinça 7 Asts: Parker 6

Tivoli Hall, Ljubljana
Attendance: 1,500
Referees: Sreten Radović (CRO), Marek Cmikiewicz (POL), David Berekashvili (GEO)
