= EuroBasket 2013 knockout stage =

The knockout stage of the EuroBasket 2013 took place between 18 and 22 September 2013. All games were played at Arena Stožice in Ljubljana, Slovenia.

The group composed of the top four teams from the Groups E and F.

== Bracket ==
Quarter-finals
18 September
Serbia	60
Spain	90
18 September
Slovenia	62
France	72
19 September
Croatia	84
Ukraine	72
19 September
Lithuania	81
Italy	77

Semi-finals
20 September
Spain	72
France (OT)	75
20 September
Croatia	62
Lithuania	77

Final
22 September
France	80
Lithuania	66
Third place
22 September
Spain	92
Croatia	66

5th place bracket

Semi-finals
19 September
Serbia	74
Slovenia	92
20 September
Ukraine	66
Italy	58

Fifth place
21 September
Slovenia	69
Ukraine	63
Seventh place
21 September
Serbia	76
Italy	64

== Quarterfinals ==
=== Serbia vs. Spain ===
18 September 2013
17:30

Boxscore

Serbia	60–90	Spain
Scoring by quarter: 5–21, 18–27, 16–25, 21–17
Pts: Anđušić, Katić 11; Rebs: Bogdanović 7 Asts: Micić 3		Pts: Rodríguez 22; Rebs: Rubio 6 Asts: Gasol, Rubio 6

Arena Stožice, Ljubljana
Attendance: 7,610
Referees: Christos Christodoulou (GRE), Olegs Latiševs (LAT), Srđan Dozai (CRO)

=== Slovenia vs. France ===
18 September 2013
21:00

Boxscore

Slovenia	62–72	France
Scoring by quarter: 12–10, 12–16, 21–24, 17–22
Pts: G. Dragić 18; Rebs: Vidmar 8 Asts: G. Dragić 6		Pts: Parker 27; Rebs: Ajinça 9 Asts: Diaw 3

Arena Stožice, Ljubljana
Attendance: 10,000
Referees: Luigi Lamonica (ITA), Robert Lottermoser (GER), Borys Ryzhyk (UKR)

=== Croatia vs. Ukraine ===
19 September 2013
17:45

Boxscore

Croatia	84–72	Ukraine
Scoring by quarter: 22–22, 29–13, 19–26, 14–11
Pts: Simon 23; Rebs: Ukić 5 Asts: Draper 6		Pts: Jeter 19; Rebs: Gladyr 9 Asts: Jeter 6

Arena Stožice, Ljubljana
Attendance: 7,700
Referees: Juan Arteaga (ESP), Olegs Latiševs (LAT), Emin Mogulkoc (TUR)

=== Lithuania vs. Italy ===
19 September 2013
21:00

Boxscore

Lithuania	81–77	Italy
Scoring by quarter: 22–15, 18–24, 17–19, 24–19
Pts: Seibutis, Kalnietis 17; Rebs: Kalnietis 7 Asts: Mačiulis, Kalnietis 5		Pts: Belinelli 22; Rebs: Cusin 8 Asts: Cinciarini 3

Arena Stožice, Ljubljana
Attendance: 8,210
Referees: Ilija Belošević (SRB), Vicente Bulto (ESP), Damir Javor (SLO)

== Classification 5–8 ==
=== Serbia vs. Slovenia ===
19 September 2013
14:30

Boxscore

Serbia	74–92	Slovenia
Scoring by quarter: 16–30, 19–23, 20–18, 19–21
Pts: Nen. Krstić 16; Rebs: Bjelica 7 Asts: Micić 4		Pts: Z. Dragić 23; Rebs: Z. Dragić 9 Asts: G. Dragić 5

Arena Stožice, Ljubljana
Attendance: 5,730
Referees: Fernando Rocha (POR), Elias Koromilas (GRE), Chris Dodds (SCO)

=== Italy vs. Ukraine ===
20 September 2013
14:30

Boscore

Italy	58–66	Ukraine
Scoring by quarter: 17–13, 17–22, 14–16, 10–15
Pts: Aradori 15; Rebs: Aradori 9 Asts: Cinciarini 4		Pts: Jeter 20; Rebs: three players 6 Asts: Jeter 4

Arena Stožice, Ljubljana
Attendance: 3,070
Referees: Juan Arteaga (ESP), Srđan Dozai (CRO), Rüştü Nuran (TUR)

== Semifinals ==
=== Lithuania vs. Croatia ===
20 September 2013
17:45

Boscore

Lithuania	77–62	Croatia
Scoring by quarter: 24–19, 16–18, 21–8, 16–17
Pts: Mačiulis 23; Rebs: Kleiza 11; Asts: Kalnietis, Seibutis 4		Pts: Bogdanović 15; Rebs: Ukić 7 Asts: Ukić 5

Arena Stožice, Ljubljana
Attendance: 9,180
Referees: Luigi Lamonica (ITA), Robert Lottermoser (GER), Christos Christodoulou (GRE)

=== Spain vs. France ===
20 September 2013
21:00

Boxscore

Spain	72–75 (OT)	France
Scoring by quarter: 18–14, 16–6, 15–23, 16–22, Overtime: 7–10
Pts: Gasol 19; Rebs: Gasol 9 Asts: Rodríguez 9		Pts: Parker 32; Rebs: Piétrus, Diaw 8 Asts: Diaw 3

Arena Stožice, Ljubljana
Attendance: 9,060
Referees: Ilija Belošević (SRB), Olegs Latiševs (LAT), Damir Javor (SLO)

== Seventh place game ==
21 September 2013
17:30

Boxscore

Serbia	76–64	Italy
Scoring by quarter: 27–11, 14–16, 14–17, 21–20
Pts: Nen. Krstić 17; Rebs: Bjelica 10; Asts: Nedović, Bjelica 4		Pts: Datome 19; Rebs: Cinciarini 5 Asts: Cinciarini 6

Arena Stožice, Ljubljana
Attendance: 4,030
Referees: Robert Lottermoser (GER), Borys Ryzhyk (UKR), Vicente Bulto (ESP)

== Fifth place game ==
21 September 2013
21:00

Boxscore

Slovenia	69–63	Ukraine
Scoring by quarter: 16–23, 24–13, 14–8, 15–19
Pts: G. Dragić 19; Rebs: G. Dragić 7 Asts: G. Dragić 4		Pts: Jeter, Zaytsev 12; Rebs: Natyazhko, Korniyenko 7 Asts: Jeter 4

Arena Stožice, Ljubljana
Attendance: 10,000
Referees: Christos Christodoulou (GRE), Fernando Rocha (POR), Milivoje Jovčić (SRB)

== Third place game ==
22 September 2013
17:30

Boxscore

Spain	92–66	Croatia
Scoring by quarter: 23–18, 24–18, 16–12, 29–18
Pts: Llull 21; Rebs: Gasol 8 Asts: Rubio 6		Pts: Bogdanović 22; Rebs: Žorić 6 Asts: Draper, Ukić 4

Arena Stožice, Ljubljana
Attendance: 6,050
Referees: Robert Lottermoser (GER), Christos Christodoulou (GRE), Olegs Latiševs (LAT)

== Final ==
22 September 2013
21:00

Boxscore

France	80–66	Lithuania
Scoring by quarter: 19–22, 31–12, 18–16, 12–16
Pts: Batum 17; Rebs: Ajinça 10; Asts: Diaw 4		Pts: Kleiza 20; Rebs: Mačiulis 6 Asts: three players 2

Arena Stožice, Ljubljana
Attendance: 10,000
Referees: Luigi Lamonica (ITA), Juan Arteaga (ESP), Ilija Belošević (SRB)
