= EuroBasket 2013 Group D =

Group D of the EuroBasket 2013 took place between 4 and 9 September 2013. The group played all of its games at the Arena Bonifika in Koper, Slovenia.

The group composed of Finland, Greece, Italy, Russia, Sweden and Turkey. The three best ranked teams advanced to the second round.

== Standings ==
Team	Pld	W	L	PF	PA	PD	Pts	Tie
Italy	5	5	0	391	339	+52	10	
Finland	5	4	1	358	337	+21	9	
Greece	5	3	2	392	350	+42	8	
Sweden	5	1	4	345	391	−46	6	1–1, 1.040
Turkey	5	1	4	355	398	−43	6	1–1, 1.006
Russia	5	1	4	374	400	−26	6	1–1, 0.956

All times are local (UTC+2)

== 4 September ==
=== Turkey vs. Finland ===
4 September 2013
14:30

Boxscore

Turkey	55–61	Finland
Scoring by quarter: 8–10, 11–22, 19–17, 17–12
Pts: Arslan 12; Rebs: Gönlüm 7 Asts: Arslan 5		Pts: Salin, Koponen 12; Rebs: Koponen 9 Asts: three players 3

Arena Bonifika, Koper
Attendance: 1,530
Referees: Ilija Belošević (SRB), Joseph Bissang (FRA), Sergiy Zashchuk (UKR)

=== Sweden vs. Greece ===
4 September 2013
17:45

Boxscore

Sweden	51–79	Greece
Scoring by quarter: 13–15, 8–24, 14–20, 16–20
Pts: Taylor 16; Rebs: Kjellbom 5 Asts: three players 2		Pts: Spanoulis 13; Rebs: Mavrokefalidis 9 Asts: Kaimakoglou 3

Arena Bonifika, Koper
Attendance: 1,050
Referees: Juris Kokainis (LAT), Ademir Zurapović (BIH), Renaud Geller (BEL)

=== Russia vs. Italy ===
4 September 2013
21:00

Boxscore

Russia	69–76	Italy
Scoring by quarter: 18–25, 11–17, 13–14, 27–20
Pts: Shved 17; Rebs: Shved 5 Asts: Monia 5		Pts: Datome 25; Rebs: Cusin 9 Asts: Belinelli 5

Arena Bonifika, Koper
Attendance: 3,700
Referees: Robert Lottermoser (GER), Seffi Shemmesh (ISR), Igor Dragojević (MNE)

== 5 September ==
=== Finland vs. Sweden ===
5 September 2013
14:30

Boxscore

Finland	81–60	Sweden
Scoring by quarter: 27–27, 21–4, 19–15, 14–14
Pts: Lee 14; Rebs: Kotti 8 Asts: Koponen 6		Pts: Taylor 19; Rebs: Taylor 6 Asts: Jerebko 4

Arena Bonifika, Koper
Attendance: 1,960
Referees: Robert Lottermoser (GER), Sergiy Zashchuk (UKR), Igor Dragojević (MNE)

=== Italy vs. Turkey ===
5 September 2013
17:45

Boxscore

Italy	90–75	Turkey
Scoring by quarter: 22–19, 22–15, 30–23, 16–18
Pts: Aradori 23; Rebs: Melli 10; Asts: Diener 4		Pts: Aşık, Türkoğlu 12; Rebs: Preldžič 8 Asts: three players 4

Arena Bonifika, Koper
Attendance: 3,000
Referees: Ademir Zurapović (BIH), Juris Kokainis (LAT), Renaud Geller (BEL)

=== Greece vs. Russia ===
5 September 2013
21:00

Boxscore

Greece	80–71	Russia
Scoring by quarter: 16–21, 25–13, 21–13, 18–24
Pts: Spanoulis, Kaimakoglou 11; Rebs: Bourousis, Mavrokefalidis 6 Asts: Zisis 6		Pts: Shved 17; Rebs: Karasev 7 Asts: Shved 4

Arena Bonifika, Koper
Attendance: 2,500
Referees: Ilija Belošević (SRB), Marius Ciulin (ROU), Joseph Bissang (FRA)

== 7 September ==
=== Russia vs. Sweden ===
7 September 2013
14:30

Boxscore

Russia	62–81	Sweden
Scoring by quarter: 15–18, 14–16, 16–18, 17–29
Pts: Shved 15; Rebs: Valiev 6 Asts: Fridzon, Ponkrashov 4		Pts: Taylor 25; Rebs: Jerebko 13; Asts: Taylor 4

Arena Bonifika, Koper
Attendance: 1,630
Referees: Seffi Shemmesh (ISR), Juris Kokainis (LAT), Igor Dragojević (MNE)

=== Italy vs. Finland ===
7 September 2013
17:45

Boxscore

Italy	62–44	Finland
Scoring by quarter: 14–17, 17–9, 15–8, 16–10
Pts: Datome 10; Rebs: Datome, Cinciarini 8 Asts: Aradori 5		Pts: three players 8 Rebs: Kotti 7 Asts: five players 1

Arena Bonifika, Koper
Attendance: 3,170
Referees: Ilija Belošević (SRB), Marius Ciulin (ROU), Joseph Bissang (FRA)

=== Turkey vs. Greece ===
7 September 2013
21:00

Boxscore

Turkey	61–84	Greece
Scoring by quarter: 16–21, 19–20, 14–23, 12–20
Pts: İlyasova 13; Rebs: Gönlüm 8 Asts: Arslan 5		Pts: Bourousis 21; Rebs: Kaimakoglou 6 Asts: Zisis 11

Arena Bonifika, Koper
Attendance: 3,010
Referees: Robert Lottermoser (GER), Ademir Zurapović (BIH), Renaud Geller (BEL)

== 8 September ==
=== Finland vs. Russia ===
8 September 2013
14:30

Boxscore

Finland	86–83 (2OT)	Russia
Scoring by quarter: 16–18, 15–12, 10–16, 26–21, Overtime: 8–8, 11–8
Pts: Huff 20; Rebs: Kotti, Salin 10; Asts: Koponen 11		Pts: Shved 25; Rebs: Fridzon 10; Asts: Fridzon, Shved 6

Arena Bonifika, Koper
Attendance: 2,370
Referees: Robert Lottermoser (GER), Marius Ciulin (ROU), Igor Dragojević (MNE)

=== Greece vs. Italy ===
8 September 2013
17:45

Boxscore

Greece	72–81	Italy
Scoring by quarter: 16–16, 22–20, 18–27, 16–18
Pts: Zisis 16; Rebs: Fotsis 5 Asts: Sloukas, Zisis 4		Pts: Belinelli 23; Rebs: Belinelli 7 Asts: Cinciarini 4

Arena Bonifika, Koper
Attendance: 3,170
Referees: Ilija Belošević (SRB), Renaud Geller (BEL), Sergiy Zashchuk (UKR)

=== Sweden vs. Turkey ===
8 September 2013
21:00

Boxscore

Sweden	74–87	Turkey
Scoring by quarter: 17–17, 18–23, 23–27, 16–20
Pts: Taylor 18; Rebs: Grant, Kjellbom 5 Asts: Grant 4		Pts: Arslan 22; Rebs: Gönlüm 6 Asts: Preldžič 10

Arena Bonifika, Koper
Attendance: 1,290
Referees: Ademir Zurapović (BIH), Joseph Bissang (FRA), Seffi Shemmesh (ISR)

== 9 September ==
=== Greece vs. Finland ===
9 September 2013
14:30

Boxscore

Greece	77–86	Finland
Scoring by quarter: 23–22, 12–14, 12–21, 30–29
Pts: Zisis 19; Rebs: Mavrokefalidis 7 Asts: three players 3		Pts: Koponen 29; Rebs: Kotti 6 Asts: Koponen, Salin 3

Arena Bonifika, Koper
Attendance: 2,300
Referees: Robert Lottermoser (GER), Ademir Zurapović (BIH), Seffi Shemmesh (ISR)

=== Italy vs. Sweden ===
9 September 2013
17:45

Boxscore

Italy	82–79	Sweden
Scoring by quarter: 27–20, 16–28, 20–15, 19–16
Pts: Gentile 19; Rebs: Aradori 7 Asts: Gentile 5		Pts: Taylor 28; Rebs: Jerebko 8 Asts: Massamba 5

Arena Bonifika, Koper
Attendance: 1,960
Referees: Marius Ciulin (ROU), Igor Dragojević (MNE), Sergiy Zashchuk (UKR)

=== Turkey vs. Russia ===
9 September 2013
21:00

Boxscore

Turkey	77–89	Russia
Scoring by quarter: 17–16, 23–23, 17–19, 20–31
Pts: Savaş 18; Rebs: Gönlüm, İlyasova 6 Asts: Arslan, Güler 3		Pts: Karasev 25; Rebs: four players 5 Asts: Shved 9

Arena Bonifika, Koper
Attendance: 2,110
Referees: Ilija Belošević (SRB), Renaud Geller (BEL), Juris Kokainis (LAT)
