= List of indoor arenas in Slovenia =

The following is a list of indoor arenas in Slovenia, ordered by a seating capacity. All venues with at least 2,000 seats are listed.

== Current arenas ==
Image	Stadium	Capacity	City	Inaugurated
	Arena Stožice	12,480	Ljubljana	2010
	Tivoli Hall	6,800 (big hall); 4,500 (small hall)	Ljubljana	1965
	Zlatorog Arena	5,191	Celje	2003
	Podmežakla Hall	4,500	Jesenice	1978
	Tabor Hall	3,261	Maribor	1984
	Golovec Hall	3,200	Celje	1976
	Arena Bonifika	3,000	Koper	1999
	Domžale Sports Hall	2,500	Domžale	1967
	Red Hall	2,500	Velenje	1975
	Tri Lilije Hall	2,500	Laško	1995
	Lukna Sports Hall	2,100	Maribor	2006

== See also ==
- List of indoor arenas in Europe
- List of indoor arenas by capacity
