= EuroBasket 2013 Group F =

Group F of the EuroBasket 2013 took place between 12 and 16 September 2013. The group played all of its games at Arena Stožice in Ljubljana, Slovenia.

The group composed of the best three teams from Group C and D. The four best ranked teams advanced to the knockout stage.

== Standings ==
Team	Pld	W	L	PF	PA	PD	Pts	Tie
Croatia	5	4	1	372	361	+11	9	
Slovenia	5	3	2	385	379	+6	8	1–0
Italy	5	3	2	374	357	+17	8	0–1
Spain	5	2	3	375	339	+36	7	1–0
Finland	5	2	3	341	385	−44	7	0–1
Greece	5	1	4	381	407	−26	6	

All times are local (UTC+2)

== 12 September ==
=== Finland vs. Croatia ===
12 September 2013
14:30

Boxscore

Finland	63–88	Croatia
Scoring by quarter: 11–17, 9–22, 18–24, 25–25
Pts: Huff 10; Rebs: Salin 6 Asts: Koponen 4		Pts: Rudež 17; Rebs: Markota 11; Asts: Draper 4

Arena Stožice, Ljubljana
Attendance: 4,320
Referees: Fernando Rocha (POR), Milivoje Jovčić (SRB), Marius Ciulin (ROU)

=== Greece vs. Spain ===
12 September 2013
17:45

Boxscore

Greece	79–75	Spain
Scoring by quarter: 16–26, 25–12, 11–19, 27–18
Pts: Spanoulis 20; Rebs: Kaimakoglou, Printezis 5 Asts: Zisis, Spanoulis 3		Pts: Fernández, Gasol 20; Rebs: Claver 11; Asts: Fernández 4

Arena Stožice, Ljubljana
Attendance: 3,980
Referees: Ilija Belošević (SRB), Borys Ryzhyk (UKR), Ademir Zurapović (BIH)

=== Slovenia vs. Italy ===
12 September 2013
21:00

Boxscore

Slovenia	84–77	Italy
Scoring by quarter: 18–21, 27–18, 15–15, 24–23
Pts: G. Dragić 22; Rebs: Z. Dragić 11; Asts: G. Dragić 6		Pts: Gentile 20; Rebs: Datome 6 Asts: Belinelli 4

Arena Stožice, Ljubljana
Attendance: 13,000
Referees: Robert Lottermoser (GER), Olegs Latiševs (LAT), Emin Mogulkoc (TUR)

== 14 September ==
=== Croatia vs. Italy ===
14 September 2013
14:30

Boxscore

Croatia	76–68	Italy
Scoring by quarter: 8–17, 23–19, 26–9, 19–23
Pts: Bogdanović 18; Rebs: Tomić, Žorić 8 Asts: Ukić 3		Pts: Datome 24; Rebs: Datome 7 Asts: Belinelli, Diener 3

Arena Stožice, Ljubljana
Attendance: 7,340
Referees: Ilija Belošević (SRB), Borys Ryzhyk (UKR), Joseph Bissang (FRA)

=== Spain vs. Finland ===
14 September 2013
17:45

Boxscore

Spain	82–56	Finland
Scoring by quarter: 18–15, 24–15, 15–14, 25–12
Pts: Calderón 23; Rebs: Claver, Gasol 7 Asts: Calderón 5		Pts: Koponen 17; Rebs: Lee 6 Asts: Koponen 4

Arena Stožice, Ljubljana
Attendance: 3,570
Referees: Olegs Latiševs (LAT), Milivoje Jovčić (SRB), Renaud Geller (BEL)

=== Greece vs. Slovenia ===
14 September 2013
21:00

Boxscore

Greece	65–73	Slovenia
Scoring by quarter: 13–26, 14–17, 19–19, 19–11
Pts: Spanoulis 21; Rebs: Spanoulis 8 Asts: Spanoulis 3		Pts: G. Dragić 28; Rebs: Begić 8 Asts: G. Dragić 4

Arena Stožice, Ljubljana
Attendance: 13,000
Referees: Robert Lottermoser (GER), Fernando Rocha (POR), Marius Ciulin (ROU)

== 16 September ==
=== Croatia vs. Greece ===
16 September 2013
14:30

Boxscore

Croatia	92–88 (2OT)	Greece
Scoring by quarter: 16–17, 20–17, 15–16, 19–20, Overtime: 7–7, 15–11
Pts: Bogdanović 22; Rebs: Tomić 12; Asts: Ukić 5		Pts: Bourousis 21; Rebs: Bourousis 9 Asts: Zisis 5

Arena Stožice, Ljubljana
Attendance: 3,090
Referees: Olegs Latiševs (LAT), Milivoje Jovčić (SRB), Borys Ryzhyk (UKR)

=== Italy vs. Spain ===
16 September 2013
17:45

Boxscore

Italy	86–81 (OT)	Spain
Scoring by quarter: 24–12, 13–25, 8–19, 25–14, Overtime: 16–11
Pts: Gentile 25; Rebs: Cusin 11; Asts: Aradori 3		Pts: Gasol 32; Rebs: Gasol 10; Asts: Rodríguez 6

Arena Stožice, Ljubljana
Attendance: 4,310
Referees: Robert Lottermoser (GER), Fernando Rocha (POR), Emin Mogulkoc (TUR)

=== Finland vs. Slovenia ===
16 September 2013
21:00

Boxscore

Finland	92–76	Slovenia
Scoring by quarter: 22–26, 20–16, 29–14, 21–20
Pts: Lee 17; Rebs: Lee 6 Asts: Koponen 6		Pts: Nachbar 15; Rebs: Vidmar 6 Asts: Lakovič, Blažič 4

Arena Stožice, Ljubljana
Attendance: 10,000
Referees: Ilija Belošević (SRB), Marius Ciulin (ROU), Chris Dodds (SCO)
