= EuroBasket 2013 Group C =

Group C of the EuroBasket 2013 took place between 4 and 9 September 2013. The group played all of its games at Zlatorog Arena in Celje, Slovenia.

The group composed of Croatia, Czech Republic, Georgia, Poland, Slovenia and Spain. The three best ranked teams advanced to the second round.

== Standings ==
Team	Pld	W	L	PF	PA	PD	Pts	Tie
Spain	5	4	1	369	269	+100	9	1–0
Croatia	5	4	1	337	341	−4	9	0–1
Slovenia	5	3	2	347	344	+3	8	
Czech Republic	5	2	3	316	339	−23	7	
Georgia	5	1	4	366	394	−28	6	1–0
Poland	5	1	4	329	377	−48	6	0–1

All times are local (UTC+2)

== 4 September ==
=== Georgia vs. Poland ===
4 September 2013
14:30

Boxscore

Georgia	84–67	Poland
Scoring by quarter: 20–14, 19–8, 16–15, 29–30
Pts: Sanikidze 23; Rebs: Shermadini 9 Asts: Tsintsadze 7		Pts: Gortat 12; Rebs: Gortat 8 Asts: Koszarek 7

Zlatorog Arena, Celje
Attendance: 850
Referees: Milivoje Jovčić (SRB), Fernando Rocha (POR), Chris Dodds (SCO)

=== Spain vs. Croatia ===
4 September 2013
17:45

Boxscore

Spain	68–40	Croatia
Scoring by quarter: 24–9, 9–11, 16–17, 19–3
Pts: Fernández 15; Rebs: Gasol 11; Asts: Rubio 7		Pts: Bogdanović 12; Rebs: Ukić, Bogdanović 7 Asts: Draper 2

Zlatorog Arena, Celje
Attendance: 3,430
Referees: Olegs Latiševs (LAT), Petar Obradović (BIH), Gentian Cici (ALB)

=== Czech Republic vs. Slovenia ===
4 September 2013
21:00

Boxscore

Czech Republic	60–62	Slovenia
Scoring by quarter: 19–21, 13–15, 14–15, 14–11
Pts: Veselý 17; Rebs: Welsch 5 Asts: Veselý 7		Pts: Balažič 11; Rebs: Balažič, Begić 8 Asts: G. Dragić 9

Zlatorog Arena, Celje
Attendance: 4,650
Referees: Borys Ryzhyk (UKR), Omer Esteron (ISR), Aleksandar Milojević (MKD)

== 5 September ==
=== Croatia vs. Georgia ===
5 September 2013
14:30

Boxscore

Croatia	77–76	Georgia
Scoring by quarter: 17–15, 18–19, 15–18, 27–24
Pts: Draper 16; Rebs: Simon 6 Asts: Tomić 7		Pts: Tsintsadze 25; Rebs: Shermadini 9 Asts: Tsintsadze 4

Zlatorog Arena, Celje
Attendance: 1,000
Referees: Borys Ryzhyk (UKR), Olegs Latiševs (LAT), Aleksandar Milojević (MKD)

=== Poland vs. Czech Republic ===
5 September 2013
17:45

Boxscore

Poland	68–69	Czech Republic
Scoring by quarter: 25–12, 13–22, 11–16, 19–19
Pts: Ignerski 17; Rebs: Gortat 9 Asts: Koszarek 5		Pts: Veselý 23; Rebs: Veselý 14; Asts: Welsch 7

Zlatorog Arena, Celje
Attendance: 1,320
Referees: Petar Obradović (BIH), Gentian Cici (ALB), Chris Dodds (SCO)

=== Slovenia vs. Spain ===
5 September 2013
21:00

Boxscore

Slovenia	78–69	Spain
Scoring by quarter: 9–14, 16–19, 27–18, 26–18
Pts: G. Dragić 18; Rebs: G. Dragić 6 Asts: G. Dragić 7		Pts: Gasol 17; Rebs: Gasol 7 Asts: Llull 5

Zlatorog Arena, Celje
Attendance: 5,200
Referees: Fernando Rocha (POR), Milivoje Jovčić (SRB), Jurgis Laurinavičius (LTU)

== 7 September ==
=== Spain vs. Czech Republic ===
7 September 2013
14:30

Boxscore

Spain	60–39	Czech Republic
Scoring by quarter: 18–7, 15–18, 14–12, 13–2
Pts: Fernández 14; Rebs: Gasol 10; Asts: Calderón 4		Pts: Pumprla, Veselý 7 Rebs: Veselý 14; Asts: three players 2

Zlatorog Arena, Celje
Attendance: 2,150
Referees: Borys Ryzhyk (UKR), Fernando Rocha (POR), Aleksandar Milojević (MKD)

=== Croatia vs. Poland ===
7 September 2013
17:45

Boxscore

Croatia	74–70	Poland
Scoring by quarter: 24–12, 17–20, 21–17, 12–21
Pts: Bogdanović 23; Rebs: Tomić 9 Asts: Ukić, Simon 6		Pts: Ignerski 22; Rebs: Ignerski 12; Asts: Koszarek 6

Zlatorog Arena, Celje
Attendance: 3,500
Referees: Milivoje Jovčić (SRB), Jurgis Laurinavičius (LTU), Omer Esteron (ISR)

=== Georgia vs. Slovenia ===
7 September 2013
21:00

Boxscore

Georgia	68–72	Slovenia
Scoring by quarter: 19–13, 13–31, 14–10, 22–18
Pts: Hickman 19; Rebs: Sanikidze 13; Asts: Tsintsadze 6		Pts: Lorbek 18; Rebs: Nachbar 9 Asts: G. Dragić 4

Zlatorog Arena, Celje
Attendance: 4,580
Referees: Olegs Latisevs (LAT), Petar Obradović (BIH), Chris Dodds (SCO)

== 8 September ==
=== Poland vs. Spain ===
8 September 2013
14:30

Boxscore

Poland	53–89	Spain
Scoring by quarter: 5–25, 8–24, 17–27, 23–13
Pts: Zamojski 11; Rebs: three players 6 Asts: three players 2		Pts: Gasol, Rubio 15; Rebs: Gasol 6 Asts: Rubio 5

Zlatorog Arena, Celje
Attendance: 2,200
Referees: Olegs Latisevs (LAT), Petar Obradović (BIH), Chris Dodds (SCO)

=== Czech Republic vs. Georgia ===
8 September 2013
17:45

Boxscore

Czech Republic	95–79	Georgia
Scoring by quarter: 26–15, 28–20, 21–19, 20–25
Pts: Veselý 27; Rebs: Veselý 10; Asts: Satoranský 7		Pts: Tsintsadze, Markoishvili 20; Rebs: Shermadini 9 Asts: Tsintsadze 6

Zlatorog Arena, Celje
Attendance: 1,290
Referees: Milivoje Jovčić (SRB), Jurgis Laurinavičius (LTU), Gentian Cici (ALB)

=== Slovenia vs. Croatia ===
8 September 2013
21:00

Boxscore

Slovenia	74–76 (OT)	Croatia
Scoring by quarter: 20–17, 21–18, 16–20, 8–10, Overtime: 9–11
Pts: G. Dragić 23; Rebs: 3 players 8 Asts: G. Dragić 5		Pts: Bogdanović 24; Rebs: Tomić 15; Asts: 3 players 3

Zlatorog Arena, Celje
Attendance: 4,640
Referees: Fernando Rocha (POR), Borys Ryzhyk (UKR), Aleksandar Milojević (MKD)

== 9 September ==
=== Georgia vs. Spain ===
9 September 2013
14:30

Boxscore

Georgia	59–83	Spain
Scoring by quarter: 17–17, 12–24, 10–21, 20–21
Pts: Shermadini 10; Rebs: Hickman, Lezhava 5 Asts: Tsintsadze 5		Pts: Rubio 16; Rebs: Gasol, Rey 8 Asts: Gasol, Rodríguez 4

Zlatorog Arena, Celje
Attendance: 2,490
Referees: Borys Ryzhyk (UKR), Aleksandar Milojević (MKD), Omer Esteron (ISR)

=== Croatia vs. Czech Republic ===
9 September 2013
17:45

Boxscore

Croatia	70–53	Czech Republic
Scoring by quarter: 16–17, 16–16, 15–9, 23–11
Pts: Tomić 12; Rebs: Tomić 9 Asts: three players 2		Pts: Pumprla 19; Rebs: Veselý 11; Asts: Satoranský 8

Zlatorog Arena, Celje
Attendance: 2,910
Referees: Fernando Rocha (POR), Oļegs Latiševs (LAT), Petar Obradović (BIH)

=== Slovenia vs. Poland ===
9 September 2013
21:00

Boxscore

Slovenia	61–71	Poland
Scoring by quarter: 17–19, 11–17, 14–17, 19–18
Pts: Lorbek 13; Rebs: Begić 7 Asts: Joksimović 5		Pts: Kelati 21; Rebs: Gortat 12; Asts: Koszarek 8

Zlatorog Arena, Celje
Attendance: 4,590
Referees: Milivoje Jovčić (SRB), Jurgis Laurinavičius (LTU), Gentian Cici (ALB)
