= Zlatorog Arena =

Indoor sporting arena in Celje, Slovenia

- Interactive map of Zlatorog Arena
- Location: Celje, Slovenia
- Coordinates: 46.2477602°N 15.2708888°E
- Operator: ZPO Celje d.o.o.
- Capacity: 5,191
- Surface: parquet
- Field size: 40 x 20 m

Construction
- Groundbreaking: 16 April 2003
- Opened: 21 December 2003
- Architect: Arhitekt ERNST d.o.o.

Tenant
- RK Celje

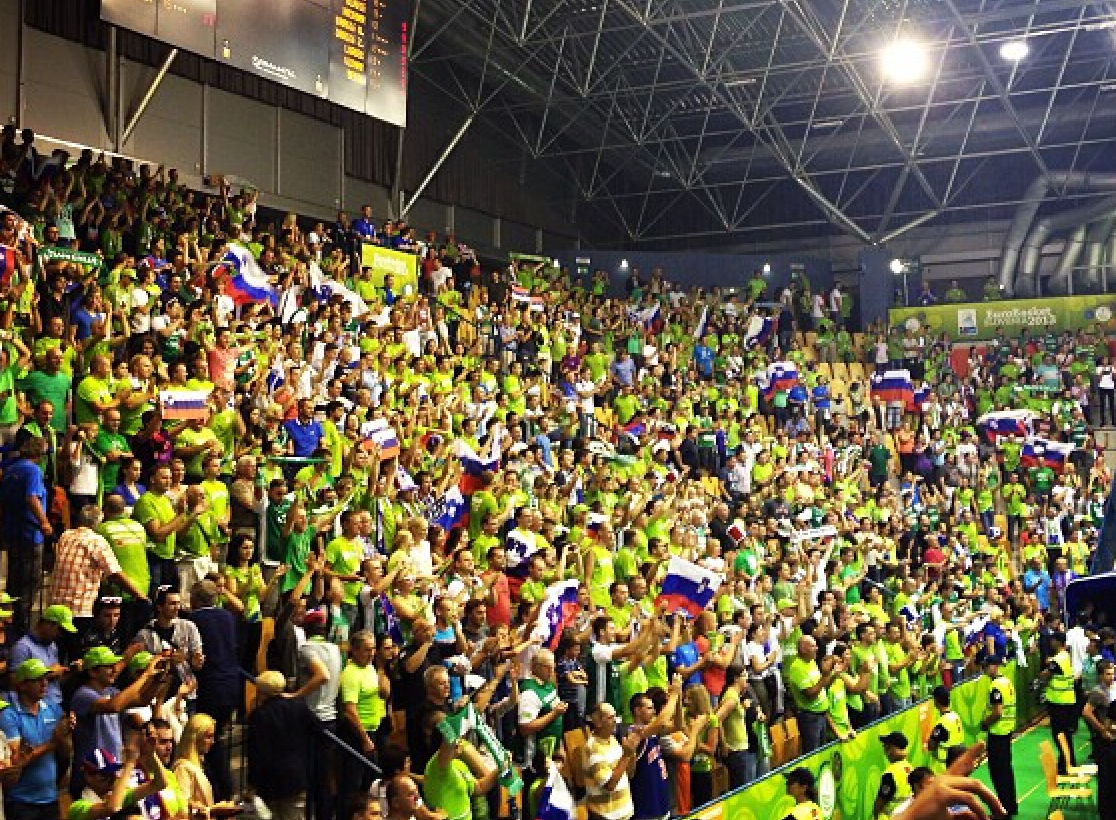
Slovenian fans during the EuroBasket 2013 match

Zlatorog Arena (Slovene: Dvorana Zlatorog) is an indoor sporting arena located in Celje, Slovenia which opened in December 2003. The arena has a capacity for 5,191 spectators.

Zlatorog Arena hosts the home games of handball club RK Celje. In 2013, it hosted the Group C of preliminary round at EuroBasket 2013. It also hosted the 2022 European Women's Handball Championship preliminary rounds.

== See also ==
- List of indoor arenas in Slovenia
