= EuroBasket 2013 Group B =

Group B of the EuroBasket 2013 took place between 4 and 9 September 2013. The group played all of its games at Podmežakla Hall in Jesenice, Slovenia.

The group composed of Bosnia and Herzegovina, Latvia, Lithuania, Macedonia, Montenegro and Serbia. The three best ranked teams advanced to the second round.

== Standings ==
Team	Pld	W	L	PF	PA	PD	Pts	Tie
Serbia	5	3	2	371	366	+5	8	3–0
Latvia	5	3	2	365	360	+5	8	1–2, 1–1, 1.021
Lithuania	5	3	2	347	337	+10	8	1–2, 1–1, 1.015
Bosnia and Herzegovina	5	3	2	358	359	−1	8	1–2, 1–1, 0.968
Montenegro	5	2	3	376	382	−6	7	
Macedonia	5	1	4	356	369	−13	6	

All times are local (UTC+2)

== 4 September ==
=== Latvia vs. Bosnia and Herzegovina ===
4 September 2013
14:30

Boxscore

Latvia	86–75	Bosnia and Herzegovina
Scoring by quarter: 20–20, 23–13, 19–24, 24–18
Pts: Freimanis 24; Rebs: Blūms 6 Asts: Strēlnieks 9		Pts: Đedović 19; Rebs: Teletović, Wright 8 Asts: Wright 2

Podmežakla Hall, Jesenice
Attendance: 1,620
Referees: Elias Koromilas (GRE), Robert Vyklický (CZE), Apostolos Kalpakas (SWE)

=== Macedonia vs. Montenegro ===
4 September 2013
17:45

Boxscore

Macedonia	80–81	Montenegro
Scoring by quarter: 24–25, 22–20, 21–19, 13–17
Pts: McCalebb 23; Rebs: Antić, Samardžiski 6 Asts: Ilievski 5		Pts: Rice, Su. Šehović 16; Rebs: Dubljević 6 Asts: Rice 5

Podmežakla Hall, Jesenice
Attendance: 2,362
Referees: Guerrino Cerebuch (ITA), Srđan Dozai (CRO), Tomasz Trawicki (POL)

=== Serbia vs. Lithuania ===
4 September 2013
21:00

Boxscore

Serbia	63–56	Lithuania
Scoring by quarter: 20–10, 13–17, 18–14, 12–15
Pts: Nen. Krstić 20; Rebs: Nen. Krstić 9 Asts: Nedović, Marković 3		Pts: Kalnietis 17; Rebs: D. Lavrinovič 6 Asts: Kalnietis 3

Podmežakla Hall, Jesenice
Attendance: 4,720
Referees: Juan Artega (ESP), Emin Moğulkoç (TUR), Sašo Petek (SLO)

== 5 September ==
=== Montenegro vs. Latvia ===
5 September 2013
14:30

Boxscore

Montenegro	72–73	Latvia
Scoring by quarter: 17–17, 20–20, 15–17, 20–19
Pts: Rice 24; Rebs: Se. Šehović, Sekulić 6 Asts: Rice 5		Pts: Janičenoks 15; Rebs: Freimanis 7 Asts: Blūms 5

Podmežakla Hall, Jesenice
Attendance: 1,600
Referees: Guerrino Cerebuch (ITA), Apostolos Kalpakas (SWE), Sašo Petek (SLO)

=== Bosnia and Herzegovina vs. Serbia ===
5 September 2013
17:45

Boxscore

Bosnia and Herzegovina	67–77	Serbia
Scoring by quarter: 16–28, 15–17, 18–19, 18–13
Pts: Đedović 17; Rebs: Đedović 7 Asts: Đedović 5		Pts: Marković 15; Rebs: Bjelica 11; Asts: Nedović 6

Podmežakla Hall, Jesenice
Attendance: 5,100
Referees: Srđan Dozai (CRO), Emin Mogulkoc (TUR), Anton Makhlin (RUS)

=== Lithuania vs. Macedonia ===
5 September 2013
21:00

Boxscore

Lithuania	75–67	Macedonia
Scoring by quarter: 20–15, 19–18, 18–17, 18–17
Pts: Kalnietis 17; Rebs: Valančiūnas 7 Asts: Kalnietis 5		Pts: Ilievski 13; Rebs: Antić 8 Asts: Ilievski 4

Podmežakla Hall, Jesenice
Attendance: 4,020
Referees: Juan Arteaga (ESP), Elias Koromilas (GRE), Robert Vyklický (CZE)

== 6 September ==
=== Montenegro vs. Bosnia and Herzegovina ===
6 September 2013
14:30

Boxscore

Montenegro	70–76	Bosnia and Herzegovina
Scoring by quarter: 17–13, 20–21, 22–15, 11–27
Pts: Dubljević 16; Rebs: Su. Šehović 14; Asts: Rice 4		Pts: Teletović 18; Rebs: Teletović 11; Asts: Đedović 5

Podmežakla Hall, Jesenice
Attendance: 2,320
Referees: Juan Arteaga (ESP), Emin Mogulkoc (TUR), Anton Makhlin (RUS)

=== Latvia vs. Lithuania ===
6 September 2013
17:45

Boxscore

Latvia	59–67	Lithuania
Scoring by quarter: 17–22, 14–17, 14–13, 14–15
Pts: Kuksiks 13; Rebs: Strēlnieks 6 Asts: Strēlnieks 3		Pts: Valančiūnas 11; Rebs: Valančiūnas 10; Asts: Kalnietis 6

Podmežakla Hall, Jesenice
Attendance: 3,000
Referees: Srđan Dozai (CRO), Robert Vyklický (CZE), Tomasz Trawicki (POL)

=== Macedonia vs. Serbia ===
6 September 2013
21:00

Boxscore

Macedonia	89–75	Serbia
Scoring by quarter: 29–17, 19–15, 22–13, 19–30
Pts: McCalebb 27; Rebs: Antić 14; Asts: Antić 3		Pts: Anđušić 19; Rebs: Krstić 11; Asts: Marković 3

Podmežakla Hall, Jesenice
Attendance: 5,500
Referees: Guerrino Cerebuch (ITA), Apostolos Kalpakas (SWE), Sašo Petek (SLO)

== 7 September ==
=== Bosnia and Herzegovina vs. Macedonia ===
7 September 2013
14:30

Boxscore

Bosnia and Herzegovina	62–54	Macedonia
Scoring by quarter: 16–15, 13–13, 12–17, 21–9
Pts: Teletović 22; Rebs: Wright 12; Asts: Đedović 6		Pts: McCalebb 19; Rebs: Antić 6 Asts: Ilievski 5

Podmežakla Hall, Jesenice
Attendance: 4,700
Referees: Guerrino Cerebuch (ITA), Robert Vyklický (CZE), Apostolos Kalpakas (SWE)

=== Serbia vs. Latvia ===
7 September 2013
17:45

Boxscore

Serbia	74–69	Latvia
Scoring by quarter: 28–15, 10–13, 14–23, 22–18
Pts: Nen. Krstić 25; Rebs: Kalinić 11; Asts: Nedović 4		Pts: Janičenoks 18; Rebs: Bērziņš 9 Asts: Blūms 3

Podmežakla Hall, Jesenice
Attendance: 3,200
Referees: Elias Koromilas (GRE), Emin Mogulkoc (TUR), Tomasz Trawicki (POL)

=== Lithuania vs. Montenegro ===
7 September 2013
21:00

Boxscore

Lithuania	77–70 (OT)	Montenegro
Scoring by quarter: 19–19, 13–15, 19–13, 12–16, Overtime: 14–7
Pts: K. Lavrinovič 24; Rebs: Valančiūnas 10; Asts: Kalnietis 7		Pts: Rice 19; Rebs: Dubljević 6 Asts: Bjelica 3

Podmežakla Hall, Jesenice
Attendance: 3,000
Referees: Juan Artega (ESP), Srđan Dozai (CRO), Anton Makhlin (RUS)

== 9 September ==
=== Latvia vs. Macedonia ===
9 September 2013
14:30

Boxscore

Latvia	76–66	Macedonia
Scoring by quarter: 27–16, 22–20, 13–16, 14–14
Pts: Bērziņš, Janičenoks 15; Rebs: Bērziņš, Meiers 9 Asts: Janičenoks 5		Pts: Antić 16; Rebs: Antić 5 Asts: Ilievski 3

Podmežakla Hall, Jesenice
Attendance: 2,170
Referees: Srđan Dozai (CRO), Apostolos Kalpakas (SWE), Emin Mogulkoc (TUR)

=== Lithuania vs. Bosnia and Herzegovina ===
9 September 2013
17:45

Boxscore

Lithuania	72–78	Bosnia and Herzegovina
Scoring by quarter: 18–18, 12–13, 22–26, 20–21
Pts: Kleiza 20; Rebs: Kleiza 10; Asts: Kalnietis 6		Pts: Teletović 31; Rebs: Teletović 7 Asts: Gordić 5

Podmežakla Hall, Jesenice
Attendance: 3,170
Referees: Elias Koromilas (GRE), Tomasz Trawicki (POL), Anton Makhlin (RUS)

=== Montenegro vs. Serbia ===
9 September 2013
21:00

Boxscore

Montenegro	83–76	Serbia
Scoring by quarter: 19–25, 15–12, 20–21, 29–18
Pts: Rice 12; Rebs: Vučević 6 Asts: Popović 6		Pts: Katić 19; Rebs: Gagić 6 Asts: Bogdanović 4

Podmežakla Hall, Jesenice
Attendance: 4,200
Referees: Juan Arteaga (ESP), Guerrino Cerebuch (ITA), Sašo Petek (SLO)
