= Arena Bonifika =

Indoor sporting arena in Koper, Slovenia

Coordinates: 45°32′36.54″N 13°43′36.48″E

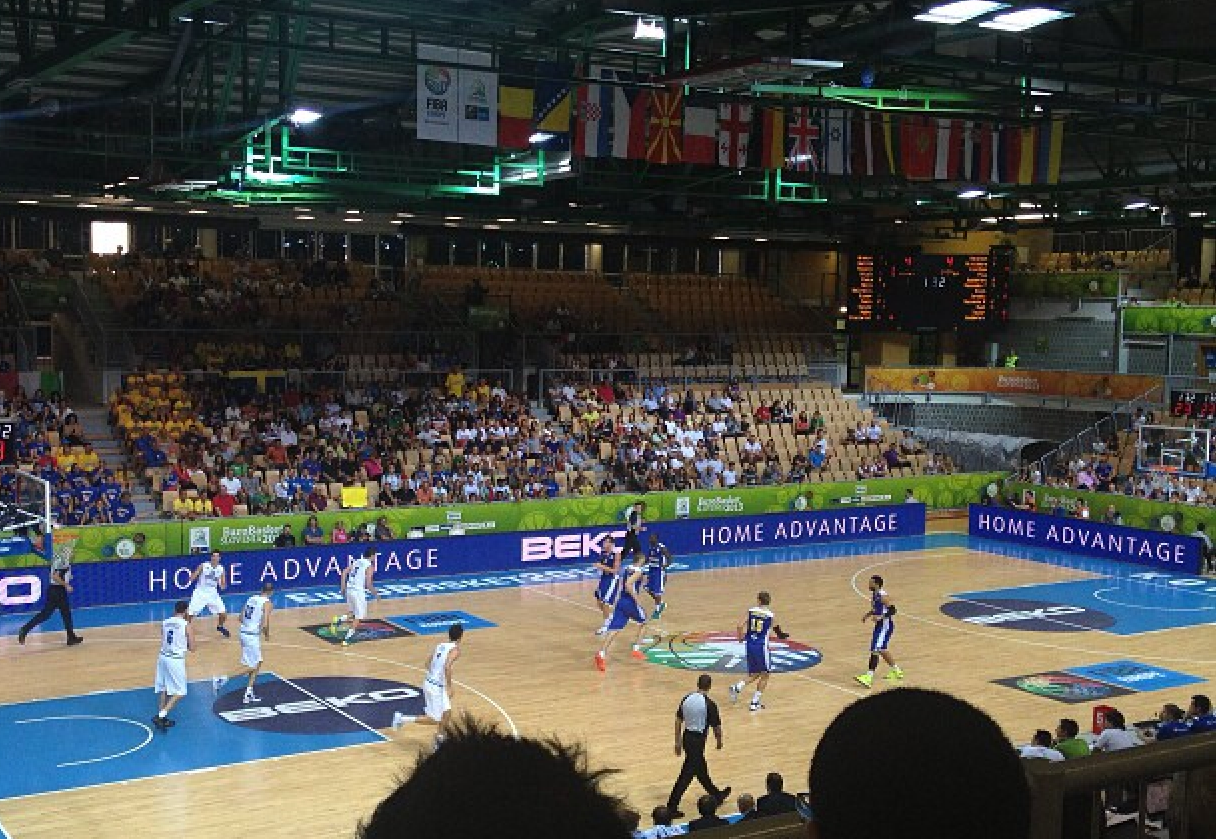
- Arena Bonifka during EuroBasket 2013
- Interactive map of Arena Bonifika
- Full name: Arena Bonifika
- Former names: Bonifika Hall (prior 2013)
- Location: Koper, Slovenia
- Operator: Sport Koper
- Capacity: 3,000
- Surface: Parquet

Construction
- Opened: May 1999
- Renovated: 2013

Tenant
- RD Koper (handball)

Arena Bonifika is an indoor sporting arena located in Koper, Slovenia with a seating capacity for 3,000 spectators. The hall is a part of the Bonifika Sports Complex, together with a smaller athletics stadium, and an indoor swimming pool. In 2013, Arena Bonifika was one of the venues for EuroBasket 2013.

== See also ==
- List of indoor arenas in Slovenia
