= EuroBasket 2013 =

International basketball event

Evropsko prvenstvo v košarki 2013 (in Slovene)

Tournament details
- Host country: Slovenia
- Dates: 4–22 September 2013
- Teams: 24
- Venues: 5 (in 4 host cities)

Final positions
- Champions: France (1st title)
- Runners-up: Lithuania
- Third place: Spain
- Fourth place: Croatia

Tournament statistics
- Games played: 90
- Attendance: 377,536 (4,195 per game)
- MVP: (France) Tony Parker
- Top scorer: (France) Tony Parker (19.0 ppg)
- Top rebounds: (Belgium) Axel Hervelle (7.9 rpg)
- Top assists: (Lithuania) Mantas Kalnietis (5.0 apg)
- PPG (Team): Spain (78.3 ppg)
- RPG (Team): Croatia (40.6 rpg)
- APG (Team): Spain (17.1 apg)

Official website
- www.fiba.basketball

EuroBasket 2013 was the 38th edition of the EuroBasket championship that was organized by FIBA Europe. It took place from 4 September until 22 September 2013 in Slovenia. The number of participating teams was 24.

France defeated Lithuania in the final to win their first title. Tony Parker was named the tournament's MVP.

== Host selection ==
Bosnia and Herzegovina, Croatia, Czech Republic, Germany, Italy and Slovenia brought forward a potential candidature for the FIBA EuroBasket. Countries which were interested in submitting a formal candidature had to do so by 31 August 2010. On 5 September 2010, it was announced that only two countries, Slovenia and Italy had submitted formal bids. On 15 October 2010, Italy announced its withdrawal from the run. The Basketball Federation of Slovenia (BFS) thus remained the only candidate organizer.

The decision on the candidacy was officially reported after FIBA Europe's meeting in Munich, Germany on 5 December 2010. In March 2011, the BFS appointed the economist Aleš Križnar as the director of the event.

== Format ==
In the first stage, every team had to play against every other team of their group (round-robin). This meant five matches per team.

From every group, the three best teams advanced to the second stage and the three worst teams were eliminated. In the second stage, two new groups were formed. The three best teams from groups A and B were united to form group E and the three best teams from groups C and D were united to form group F.

In these two new groups of the second stage only matches by teams that had not yet played each other have to be played. As for the matches that had already happened in the first stage, their results also counted in the second stage. Therefore, every team played three matches and there are 12 teams in the second stage.

Out of the second stage, the four best teams from each of the two groups advanced to the quarterfinals (8 teams in total) whereas the two worst teams will be eliminated from the championship (four teams in total).

== Financing ==
The fee that Slovenia had to pay to FIBA Europe amounted to 6 million euros. According to the agreement, half of the money was paid by the Slovenian state.

== Logo, official song and mascot of the championship ==
Official mascot

The official mascot was Lipko, whose name came from combining the Slovenian word for linden tree and the diminutive "ko". The word lipa is of Slavic origin. Lipko is spelt the same in every language and in every market where he is present.

== Attendance ==
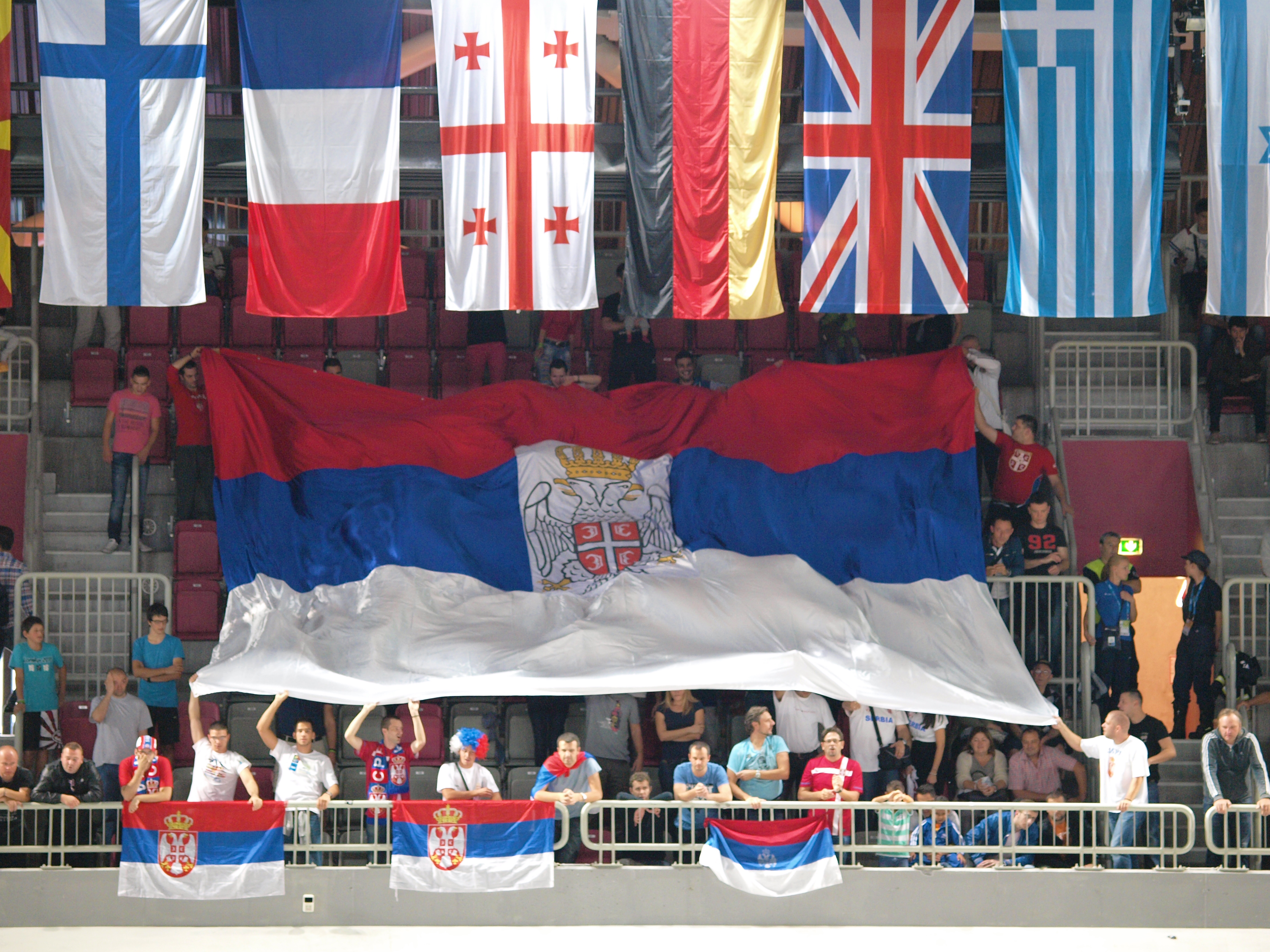
Serbian fans in Arena Stožice

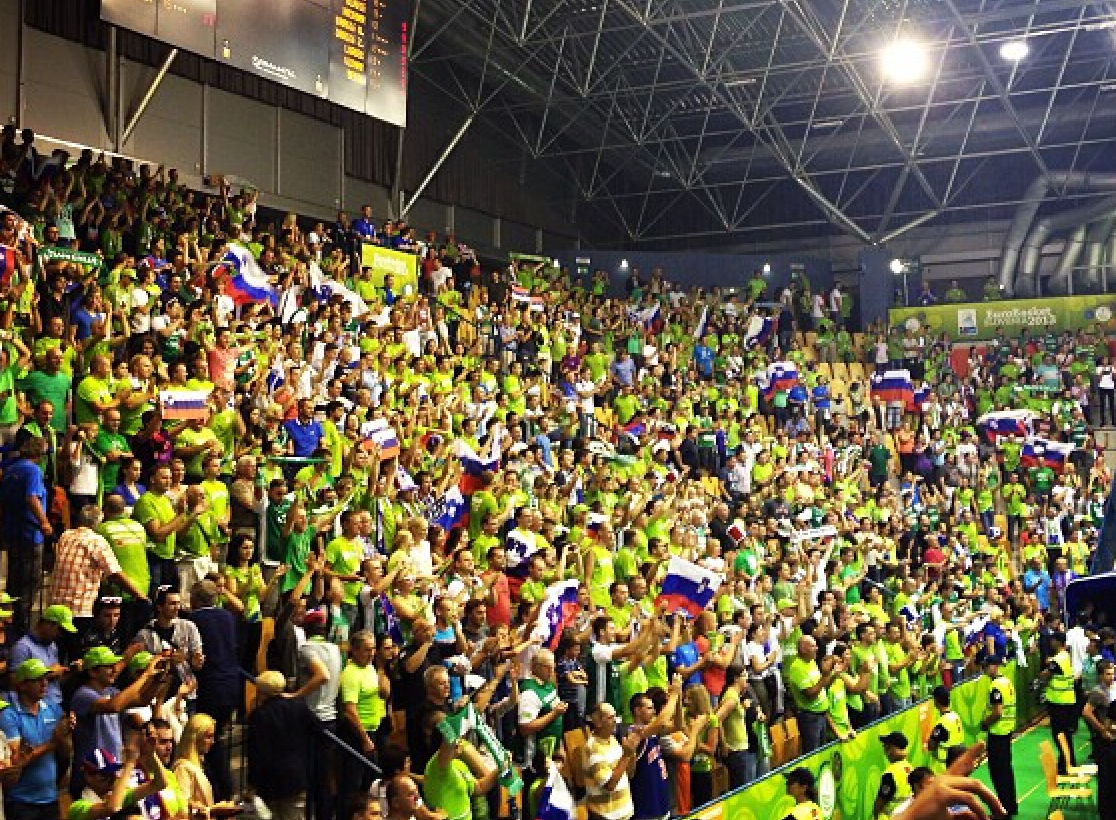
Slovenian fans in Arena Zlatorog

=== Preliminary round ===
City	Arena	Visitors (avg. per game)	Total visitors (all 15 events)	Total capacity (all 15 events)	% visitors (avg. p/g & total)
Ljubljana	Tivoli Hall	1,536	23,040	82,500	27.9
Jesenice	Podmežakla Hall	3,389	50,846	82,500	61.6
Celje	Zlatorog Arena	2,888	43,320	82,500	52.5
Koper	Arena Bonifika	2,542	38,130	75,000	46.2
–	Total (all 60 events)	2,588	155,336	322,500	48.2

- Slovenia already beat record attendance of 155,336 after preliminary round for almost 20,000 more people from previous FIBA Eurobasket. The average attendance per game was 2,588 visitors.

=== Second round ===
City	Arena	Visitors (avg. per game)	Total visitors (all 18 events)	Total capacity (all 18 events)	% visitors (avg. p/g & total)
Ljubljana	Arena Stožice	5,086	91,560	225,000	40.7

== Venues ==
On 24 March 2011, it was officially announced that the preliminary round would be played in Novo Mesto, Jesenice, Koper and Ptuj. Ljubljana, the capital of Slovenia, will host the final round at the Arena Stožice. On 18 June 2012, it was announced that the city council of Ptuj cancelled their bid for the tournament. Novo Mesto cancelled their bid on 2 July 2012. On 28 August 2012, it was confirmed that the preliminary round would be played in Celje and Ljubljana (Tivoli Hall) instead of Ptuj and Novo Mesto, which cancelled their bids.

Location	Picture	City	Arena	Capacity	Status	Round
EuroBasket 2013 is located in Slovenia		Ljubljana	Arena Stožice	12,500	Opened in 2010	Second and knockout stages
EuroBasket 2013 is located in Slovenia		Jesenice	Podmežakla Hall	5,500	Reconstruction completed in 2013	Preliminary stage
EuroBasket 2013 is located in Slovenia		Koper	Arena Bonifika	5,000	Reconstruction completed in 2013	Preliminary stage
EuroBasket 2013 is located in Slovenia		Ljubljana	Tivoli Hall	5,600	Opened in 1965	Preliminary stage
EuroBasket 2013 is located in Slovenia		Celje	Zlatorog Arena	5,500	Opened in 2003	Preliminary stage

== Qualification ==
Olympic Games or Olympic Qualifying Tournament participants Spain, France, Russia, North Macedonia, Lithuania, Greece, Slovenia and Great Britain all qualified directly to the EuroBasket 2013 Final Round.

The 31 remaining teams were divided into 5 groups of 5 teams and 1 group of 6 teams. The first and second placed teams in each group plus the 4 best third placed teams were qualified for the Final Round.

The Qualifiers were played between 15 August and 11 September 2012.

The EuroBasket 2013 draw took place on 18 November 2012; first time in the history the draw took place underground – in the Concert Hall of Postojna Cave.

=== Qualified teams ===
Participating countries of EuroBasket 2013

Competition	Date	Vacancies	Qualified
Host nation	5 December 2010	1	Slovenia
Participants of 2012 Olympics and of the 2012 Olympic Qualifying Tournament	28 July – 12 August 2012; 2–8 July 2012	7	France; Great Britain; Greece; Lithuania; Macedonia; Russia; Spain
Qualified through FIBA Eurobasket; 2013 qualification	14 August – 11 September 2012	16	Belgium; Bosnia and Herzegovina; Croatia; Czech Republic; Finland; Georgia; Germany; Israel; Italy; Latvia; Montenegro; Poland; Serbia; Sweden; Turkey; Ukraine

== Draw ==
The EuroBasket 2013 draw took place on 18 November 2012, first time in history the draw took place underground – in the Postojna Cave Concert Hall, divided the qualified teams into four groups of six, groups A, B, C, and D. It was decided that games would take place in Celje, Jesenice, Koper and Ljubljana. Included are the latest published FIBA World Rankings prior to the draw.

Seeding
Team	Qualifying PCT	Qualifying PD	Pot
Spain; France; Russia; Macedonia	Top 4 in 2011		1
Lithuania; Greece; Slovenia	Next 3 in 2011		2
Great Britain	2012 Olympics host		2
Germany	1.000	+148	3
Croatia	1.000	+146	3
Italy	1.000	+142	3
Montenegro	1.000	+117	3
Finland	.750	+145	4
Poland	.750	+136	4
Bosnia and Herzegovina	.750	+64	4
Ukraine	.750	+57	4
Georgia	.750	+41	5
Belgium	.625	+73	5
Latvia	.625	+71	5
Turkey	.625	+49	5
Czech Republic	.625	+14	6
Serbia	.600	+125	6
Israel	.600	+90	6
Sweden	.600	+54	6

Pot 1	Pot 2	Pot 3	Pot 4	Pot 5	Pot 6
Spain (2); France (8); Russia (6); Macedonia (34)	Lithuania (5); Greece (4); Slovenia (14); Great Britain (23)	Italy (21); Croatia (16); Germany (13); Montenegro (77)	Finland (48); Poland (40); Ukraine (50); Bosnia and Herzegovina (50)	Georgia (50); Belgium (77); Latvia (39); Turkey (7)	Czech Republic (61); Serbia (12); Israel (31); Sweden (83)

== Preliminary round ==
=== Group A ===
Venue: Tivoli Hall, Ljubljana

Team	Pld	W	L	PF	PA	PD	Pts	Tie
France	5	4	1	403	344	+59	9	1–0
Ukraine	5	4	1	378	352	+26	9	0–1
Belgium	5	2	3	344	371	−27	7	2–0
Great Britain	5	2	3	360	396	−36	7	1–1
Germany	5	2	3	390	396	−6	7	0–2
Israel	5	1	4	364	380	−16	6	

4 September 2013
Israel	71–75	OT	Great Britain
Belgium	57–58		Ukraine
France	74–80		Germany
5 September 2013
Ukraine	74–67		Israel
Germany	73–77	OT	Belgium
Great Britain	65–88		France
6 September 2013
Germany	83–88		Ukraine
Belgium	76–71		Great Britain
France	82–63		Israel
8 September 2013
Great Britain	81–74		Germany
Ukraine	71–77		France
Israel	87–69		Belgium
9 September 2013
Great Britain	68–87		Ukraine
Germany	80–76		Israel
Belgium	65–82		France

=== Group B ===
Venue: Podmežakla Hall, Jesenice

Team	Pld	W	L	PF	PA	PD	Pts	Tie
Serbia	5	3	2	371	366	+5	8	3–0
Latvia	5	3	2	365	360	+5	8	1–2, 1–1, 1.021
Lithuania	5	3	2	347	337	+10	8	1–2, 1–1, 1.015
Bosnia and Herzegovina	5	3	2	358	359	−1	8	1–2, 1–1, 0.968
Montenegro	5	2	3	376	382	−6	7	
Macedonia	5	1	4	356	369	−13	6	

4 September 2013
Latvia	86–75		Bosnia and Herzegovina
Macedonia	80–81		Montenegro
Serbia	63–56		Lithuania
5 September 2013
Montenegro	72–73		Latvia
Bosnia and Herzegovina	67–77		Serbia
Lithuania	75–67		Macedonia
6 September 2013
Montenegro	70–76		Bosnia and Herzegovina
Latvia	59–67		Lithuania
Macedonia	89–75		Serbia
8 September 2013
Bosnia and Herzegovina	62–54		Macedonia
Serbia	80–71		Latvia
Lithuania	77–70	OT	Montenegro
9 September 2013
Latvia	76–66		Macedonia
Lithuania	72–78		Bosnia and Herzegovina
Montenegro	83–76		Serbia

=== Group C ===
Venue: Zlatorog Arena, Celje

Team	Pld	W	L	PF	PA	PD	Pts	Tie
Spain	5	4	1	369	269	+100	9	1–0
Croatia	5	4	1	337	341	−4	9	0–1
Slovenia	5	3	2	347	344	+3	8	
Czech Republic	5	2	3	316	339	−23	7	
Georgia	5	1	4	366	394	−28	6	1–0
Poland	5	1	4	329	377	−48	6	0–1

4 September 2013
Georgia	84–67		Poland
Spain	68–40		Croatia
Czech Republic	60–62		Slovenia
5 September 2013
Croatia	77–76		Georgia
Poland	68–69		Czech Republic
Slovenia	78–69		Spain
7 September 2013
Spain	60–39		Czech Republic
Croatia	74–70		Poland
Georgia	68–72		Slovenia
8 September 2013
Poland	53–89		Spain
Czech Republic	95–79		Georgia
Slovenia	74–76	OT	Croatia
9 September 2013
Georgia	59–83		Spain
Croatia	70–53		Czech Republic
Slovenia	61–71		Poland

=== Group D ===
Venue: Arena Bonifika, Koper

Team	Pld	W	L	PF	PA	PD	Pts	Tie
Italy	5	5	0	391	339	+52	10	
Finland	5	4	1	358	337	+21	9	
Greece	5	3	2	392	350	+42	8	
Sweden	5	1	4	345	391	−46	6	1–1, 1.040
Turkey	5	1	4	355	398	−43	6	1–1, 1.006
Russia	5	1	4	374	400	−26	6	1–1, 0.956

4 September 2013
Turkey	55–61		Finland
Sweden	51–79		Greece
Russia	69–76		Italy
5 September 2013
Finland	81–60		Sweden
Italy	90–75		Turkey
Greece	80–71		Russia
7 September 2013
Russia	62–81		Sweden
Italy	62–44		Finland
Turkey	61–84		Greece
8 September 2013
Finland	86–83	2OT	Russia
Greece	72–81		Italy
Sweden	74–87		Turkey
9 September 2013
Greece	77–86		Finland
Italy	82–79		Sweden
Turkey	77–89		Russia

== Second round ==
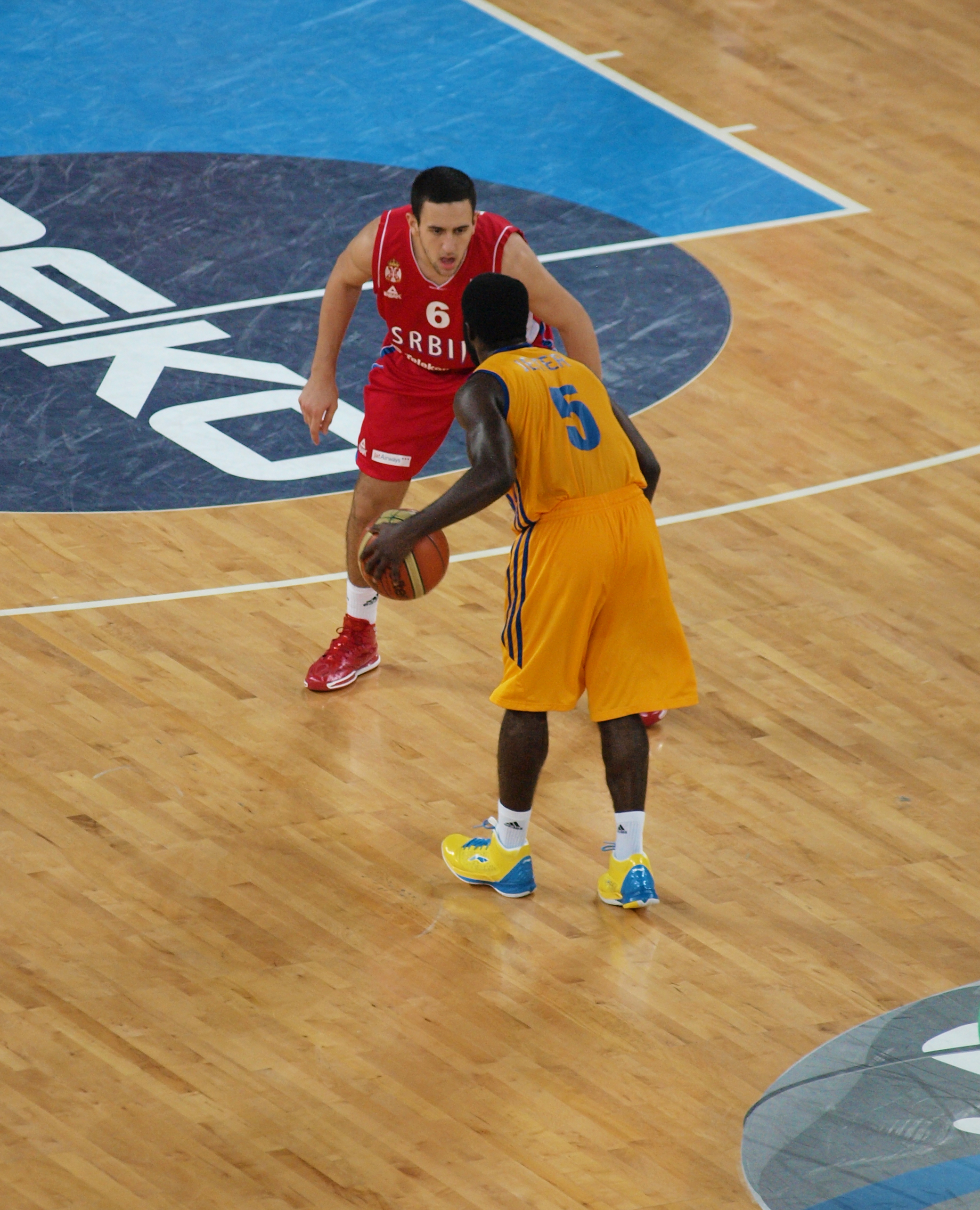
Eugene "Pooh" Jeter versus Vasilije Micić as Ukraine plays Serbia

The two groups comprised the three best-ranked teams from Groups A, B, C and D. Teams coming from the same initial group did not play again vs. each other, but "carried" the results of the matches played between them from the first round.

The best four teams advanced to the quarterfinals.

=== Group E ===
Team	Pld	W	L	PF	PA	PD	Pts	Tie
Serbia	5	4	1	371	343	+28	9	1–0
Lithuania	5	4	1	355	314	+41	9	0–1
France	5	3	2	388	380	+8	8	
Ukraine	5	2	3	325	364	−39	7	
Belgium	5	1	4	318	358	−40	6	1–0
Latvia	5	1	4	362	360	+2	6	0–1

11 September 2013
Latvia	85–51	Ukraine	Arena Stožice, Ljubljana
Belgium	69–76	Serbia	Arena Stožice, Ljubljana
Lithuania	76–62	France	Arena Stožice, Ljubljana
13 September 2013
Lithuania	86–67	Belgium	Arena Stožice, Ljubljana
Ukraine	82–75	Serbia	Arena Stožice, Ljubljana
France	102–91	Latvia	Arena Stožice, Ljubljana
15 September 2013
Latvia	56–60	Belgium	Arena Stožice, Ljubljana
Ukraine	63–70	Lithuania	Arena Stožice, Ljubljana
Serbia	77–65	France	Arena Stožice, Ljubljana

=== Group F ===
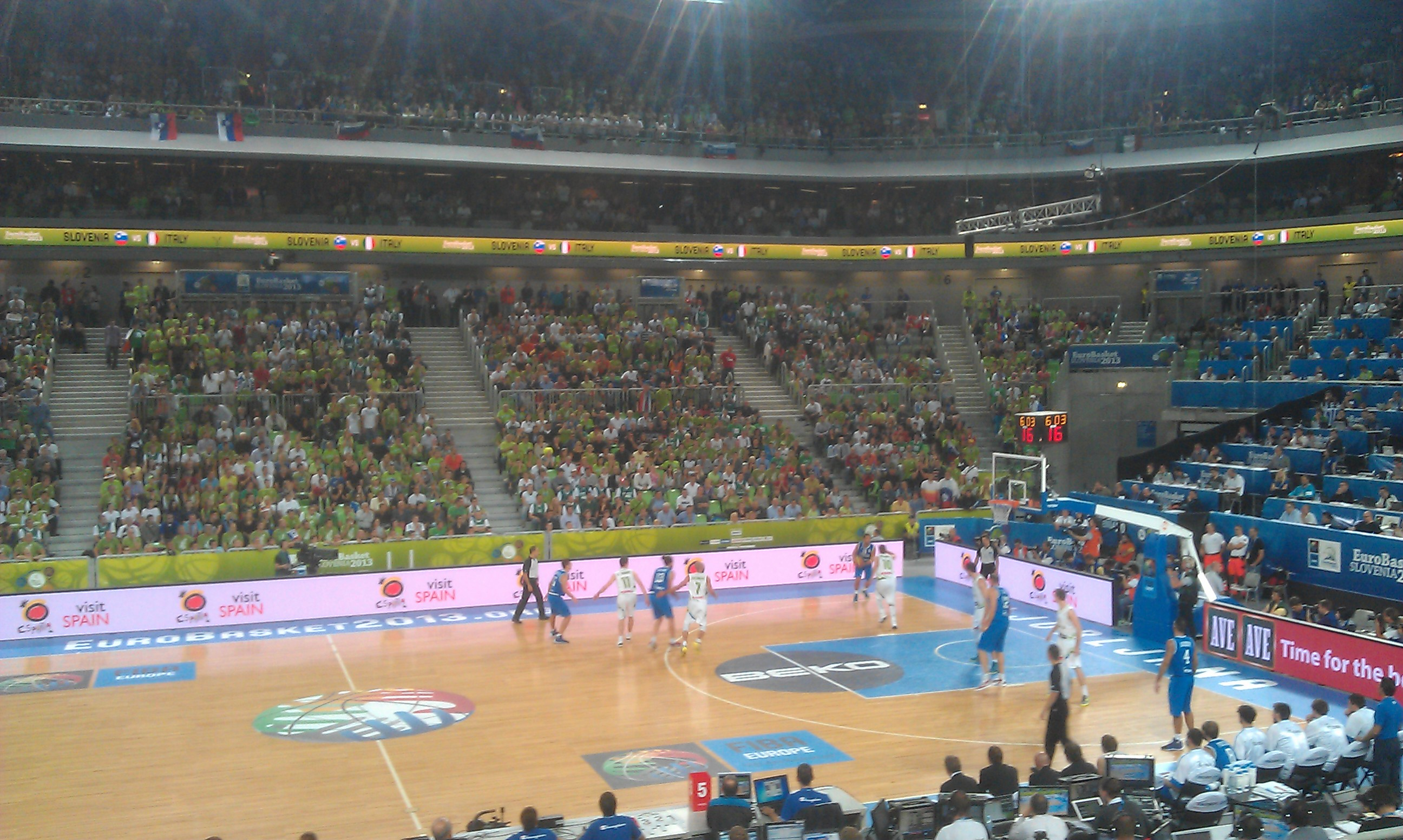
Slovenia against Italy

Team	Pld	W	L	PF	PA	PD	Pts	Tie
Croatia	5	4	1	372	361	+11	9	
Slovenia	5	3	2	385	379	+6	8	1–0
Italy	5	3	2	374	357	+17	8	0–1
Spain	5	2	3	375	339	+36	7	1–0
Finland	5	2	3	341	385	−44	7	0–1
Greece	5	1	4	381	407	−26	6	

12 September 2013
Finland	63–88		Croatia	Arena Stožice, Ljubljana
Greece	79–75		Spain	Arena Stožice, Ljubljana
Slovenia	84–77		Italy	Arena Stožice, Ljubljana
14 September 2013
Croatia	76–68		Italy	Arena Stožice, Ljubljana
Spain	82–56		Finland	Arena Stožice, Ljubljana
Greece	65–73		Slovenia	Arena Stožice, Ljubljana
16 September 2013
Croatia	92–88	2OT	Greece	Arena Stožice, Ljubljana
Italy	86–81	OT	Spain	Arena Stožice, Ljubljana
Finland	92–76		Slovenia	Arena Stožice, Ljubljana

== Knockout stage ==
- All games were held at Arena Stožice in Ljubljana, Slovenia.

Quarter-finals
18 September
Serbia	60
Spain	90
18 September
Slovenia	62
France	72
19 September
Croatia	84
Ukraine	72
19 September
Lithuania	81
Italy	77

Semi-finals
20 September
Spain	72
France (OT)	75
20 September
Croatia	62
Lithuania	77

Final
22 September
France	80
Lithuania	66
Third place
22 September
Spain	92
Croatia	66

5th place bracket

Semi-finals
19 September
Serbia	74
Slovenia	92
20 September
Ukraine	66
Italy	58

Fifth place
21 September
Slovenia	69
Ukraine	63
Seventh place
21 September
Serbia	76
Italy	64

=== Quarterfinals ===
18 September 2013
17:30

Boxscore

Serbia	60–90	Spain
Scoring by quarter: 5–21, 18–27, 16–25, 21–17

Arena Stožice, Ljubljana
Attendance: 7,610

18 September 2013
21:00

Boxscore

Slovenia	62–72	France
Scoring by quarter: 12–10, 12–16, 21–24, 17–22

Arena Stožice, Ljubljana
Attendance: 10,000

19 September 2013
17:45

Boxscore

Croatia	84–72	Ukraine
Scoring by quarter: 22–22, 29–13, 19–26, 14–11

Arena Stožice, Ljubljana
Attendance: 7,700

19 September 2013
21:00

Boxscore

Lithuania	81–77	Italy
Scoring by quarter: 22–15, 18–24, 17–19, 24–19

Arena Stožice, Ljubljana
Attendance: 8,210

=== Classification 5–8 ===
19 September 2013
14:30

Boxscore

Serbia	74–92	Slovenia
Scoring by quarter: 16–30, 19–23, 20–18, 19–21

Arena Stožice, Ljubljana
Attendance: 5,730

20 September 2013
14:30

Boxscore

Italy	58–66	Ukraine
Scoring by quarter: 17–13, 17–22, 14–16, 10–15

Arena Stožice, Ljubljana
Attendance: 3,070

=== Semifinals ===
20 September 2013
17:45

Boxscore

Lithuania	77–62	Croatia
Scoring by quarter: 24–19, 16–18, 21–8, 16–17

Arena Stožice, Ljubljana
Attendance: 9,180

20 September 2013
21:00

Boxscore

Spain	72–75 (OT)	France
Scoring by quarter: 18–14, 16–6, 15–23, 16–22, Overtime: 7–10

Arena Stožice, Ljubljana
Attendance: 9,060

=== Seventh place game ===
21 September 2013
17:30

Boxscore

Serbia	76–64	Italy
Scoring by quarter: 27–11, 14–16, 14–17, 21–20

Arena Stožice, Ljubljana
Attendance: 4,030

=== Fifth place game ===
21 September 2013
21:00

Boxscore

Slovenia	69–63	Ukraine
Scoring by quarter: 16–23, 24–13, 14–8, 15–19

Arena Stožice, Ljubljana
Attendance: 10,000

=== Third place game ===
22 September 2013
17:30

Boxscore

Spain	92–66	Croatia
Scoring by quarter: 23–18, 24–18, 16–12, 29–18

Arena Stožice, Ljubljana
Attendance: 6,050

=== Final ===
22 September 2013
21:00

Boxscore

France	80–66	Lithuania
Scoring by quarter: 19–22, 31–12, 18–16, 12–16

Arena Stožice, Ljubljana
Attendance: 10,000
Referees: Luigi Lamonica (ITA), Juan Arteaga (ESP), Ilija Belošević (SRB)

EuroBasket 2013 champions

France
First title

Most Valuable Player
(France) Tony Parker

== Final standings ==
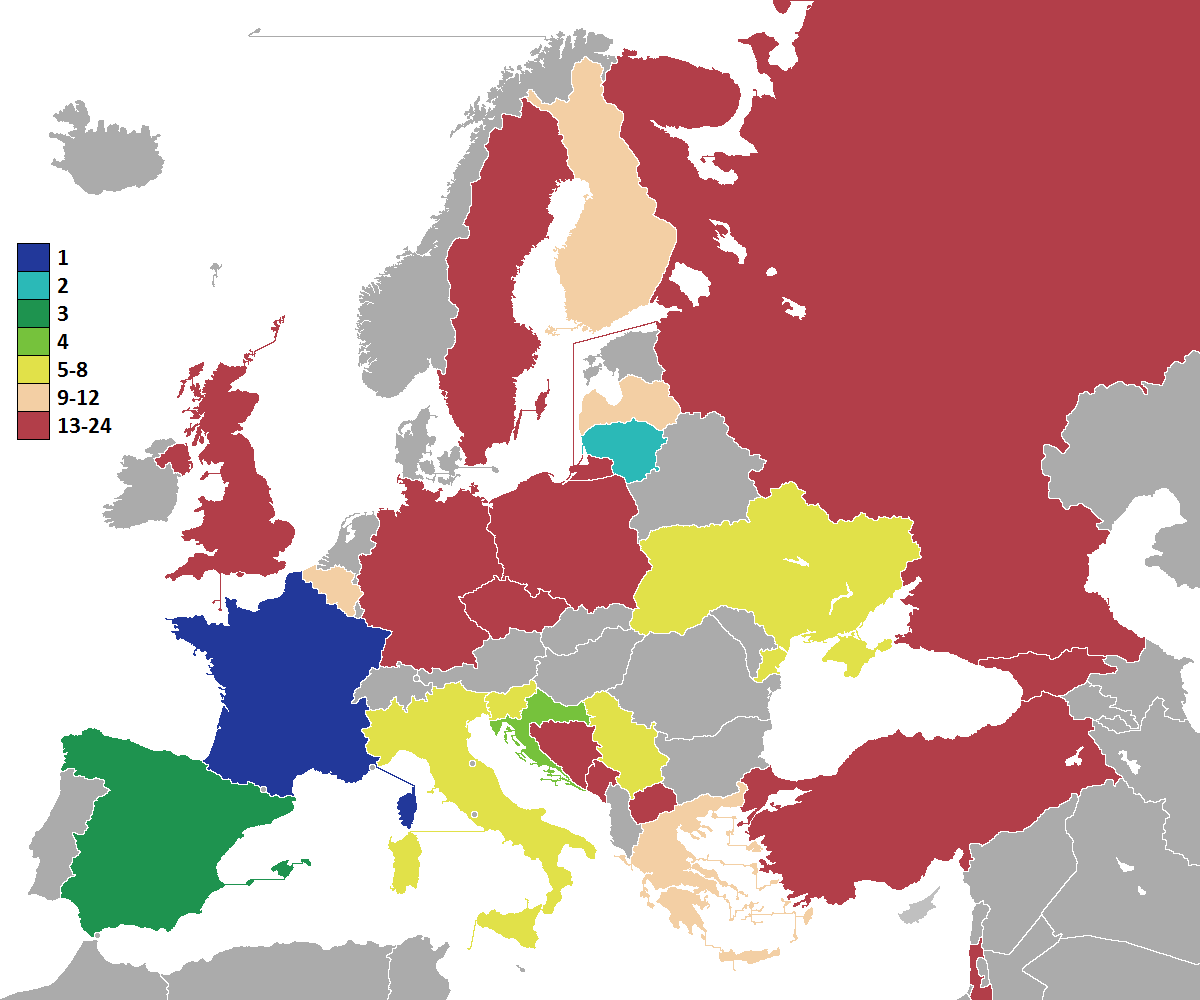
Results

Key
Qualified for the 2014 FIBA Basketball World Cup.
Qualified as host nation for the 2014 FIBA Basketball World Cup.
Received wild card for the 2014 FIBA Basketball World Cup.

Rank	Team	Record
1st place, gold medalist(s)	France	8–3
2nd place, silver medalist(s)	Lithuania	8–3
3rd place, bronze medalist(s)	Spain	7–4
4	Croatia	8–3
5	Slovenia	7–4
6	Ukraine	6–5
7	Serbia	6–5
8	Italy	6–5
9	Finland	5–3
9	Belgium	3–5
11	Greece	4–4
11	Latvia	4–4
13	Bosnia and Herzegovina	3–2
13	Czech Republic	2–3
13	Great Britain	2–3
13	Sweden	1–4
17	Germany	2–3
17	Montenegro	2–3
17	Georgia	1–4
17	Turkey	1–4
21	Macedonia	1–4
21	Israel	1–4
21	Russia	1–4
21	Poland	1–4

== All-Tournament Team ==
- PG – (France) Tony Parker (MVP)
- SG – (Slovenia) Goran Dragić
- SF – (Croatia) Bojan Bogdanović
- PF – (Lithuania) Linas Kleiza
- C – (Spain) Marc Gasol

== Statistical leaders ==
- In order for players to qualify as statistical leaders for the tournament, they had to play in at least 6 games during the competition.

Points

Name	PPG
(France) Tony Parker	19.0
(Croatia) Bojan Bogdanović	17.4
(Greece) Vassillis Spanoulis	16.7
(Slovenia) Goran Dragić	15.8
(Serbia) Nenad Krstić	15.4

Rebounds

Name	RPG
(Belgium) Axel Hervelle	7.9
(Spain) Marc Gasol	7.8
(Croatia) Ante Tomić	7.2
(France) Alexis Ajinça	7.0
(Serbia) Nemanja Bjelica	7.0

Assists

Name	APG
(Lithuania) Mantas Kalnietis	5.0
(Finland) Petteri Koponen	4.8
(Slovenia) Goran Dragić	4.5
(Greece) Nikos Zisis	4.3
(Ukraine) Eugene "Pooh" Jeter	4.1

Blocks

Name	BPG
(Ukraine) Viacheslav Kravtsov	2.0
(Italy) Marco Cusin	1.6
(Slovenia) Mirza Begić	1.5
(Lithuania) Jonas Valančiūnas	1.4
(France) Alexis Ajinça	1.3

Steals

Name	SPG
(Finland) Petteri Koponen	1.4
(Spain) Ricky Rubio	1.4
(France) Nando de Colo	1.1
(Croatia) Dontaye Draper	1.1
seven players	1.0

== FIBA broadcasting rights ==
The tournament was broadcast in a record 167 countries around the globe (previous record is 162 countries).

Country	Broadcaster
Albania	TVSH
Argentina	DirecTV
Belgium	Be TV
Belgium	TELENET
Bosnia and Herzegovina	FTV
Bosnia and Herzegovina	RTRS
Brazil	SporTV
Brazil	ESPN Brasil
Brazil	TV Esporte Interativo
Bulgaria	Nova Sport
China	CCTV-5
Croatia	HRT2
Croatia	Sportska televizija
Croatia	Sport Klub
Czech Republic	Czech Television
Cyprus	CYTA
Denmark	Viasat Sport
Estonia	Viasat Sport Baltic
Finland	Viasat Sport
Finland	Yle
France	Sport+
France	Canal+ Sport
Kosovo	Radio Television of Kosovo
Macedonia	Sitel
Georgia	1TV
Germany	Das Erste
Greece	ANT1
Greece	Cosmote TV
Hungary	Sport 1
India	NEO Sports
Ireland	BT Sport
Israel	Sport 5
Italy	Rai Sport

Country	Broadcaster
Latvia	TV6
Latvia	Viasat Sport Baltic
Lithuania	TV3
Lithuania	Viasat Sport Baltic
Japan	Fuji TV
Malaysia	Astro
Montenegro	TV Vijesti
Netherlands	Sport1
Norway	Viasat Sport
Philippines	Solar TV
Philippines	Basketball TV
Poland	Polsat Sport
Portugal	Sport TV
Qatar	Al Jazeera Sports
Romania	Digi TV (TV channel)
Russia	Rossiya 2
Russia	Sport 1
Serbia	RTS
Singapore	StarHub
Slovakia	Slovak Sport.TV
Slovenia	RTV Slovenija
Slovenia	Šport TV
South Africa	SuperSport
Spain	Cuatro
Spain	Energy
Sweden	TV10
Sweden	Viasat Sport
Turkey	NTV Spor
Ukraine	XSPORT
United Kingdom	BT Sport
United States	ESPN3
