= Slovak Sport.TV =

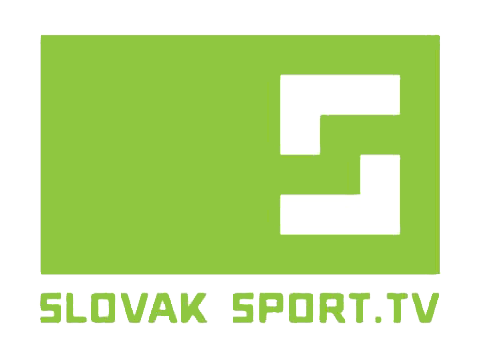
- Founded: 1 July 2012
- Headquarters: Nitra, Slovakia
- Area served: Nationally
- Key people: Róbert Greguš (CEO)
- Products: Direct broadcast satellite
- Website: www.slovaksport.tv

Slovak Sport.TV was a Slovak digital satellite television network that broadcast sports including football, tennis and ice hockey. The network went live in 2012, with a focus on sports after Slovakia's previous sports channel, Trojka, had shut down in 2011. The network launched a second channel in August 2013 and a third in September of the same year. In January 2015 the third, which had been free to air via DVB-T, concluded. By that time, Channel 1 was paid and Channel 2 was available free to air.
