= Axel Hervelle =

Belgian professional basketball player

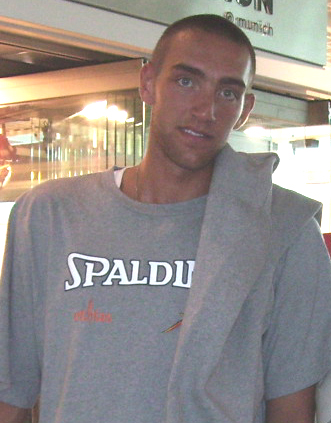
- Hervelle in 2007

Personal information
- Born: 12 May 1983 (age 43) Liège, Belgium
- Listed height: 6 ft 10 in (2.08 m)
- Listed weight: 242 lb (110 kg)

Career information
- NBA draft: 2005: 2nd round, 52nd overall pick
- Drafted by: Denver Nuggets
- Playing career: 2000–2020
- Position: Power forward

Career history
- 2000–2004: Verviers-Pepinster
- 2004–2009: Real Madrid
- 2009–2018: Bilbao
- 2018–2020: Spirou

Career highlights
- 2× Liga ACB champion (2005, 2007); EuroCup champion (2007); EuroBasket rebounding leader (2013)
- Stats at Basketball Reference

Axel Marie Gustave Hervelle (born 12 May 1983) is a Belgian former professional basketball player. He represented the senior Belgian national basketball team.

== Professional career ==
Hervelle spent the early part of his career in Belgium. He first played with Verviers-Pepinster in the Belgian League for four years, averaging 11.4 points and 10.6 rebounds per game, in 16 Belgian League games during the 2003–04 season, and becoming the team's captain at only 20 years old. He then signed with the Spanish ACB League club Real Madrid. In the 2005/06 season, he averaged 24 minutes, 8.5 points, and 5.5 rebounds per game, over 32 games played in the Spanish League. In January 2010, Hervelle signed with Bilbao.

On 3 August 2018, Hervelle signed a one-year contract with Spirou of the Belgian League.

On 30 November 2020, Hervelle announced his retirement.

=== NBA draft rights ===
Hervelle was drafted by the Denver Nuggets, in the second round (52nd pick overall) of the 2005 NBA draft. He became the first Belgian player ever to be drafted by an NBA team. In 2009, his NBA draft rights were traded to the Houston Rockets, in exchange for James White. On 27 November 2020, Hervelle's draft rights were traded to the New York Knicks.

== National team career ==
Hervelle has been a member of the senior Belgian national basketball team. He represented Belgium at the EuroBasket 2015, where they lost to Greece, in the tournament's eighth finals, by a score of 75–54.

== Career statistics ==
=== Domestic leagues ===
Season	Team	League	GP	MPG	FG%	3P%	FT%	RPG	APG	SPG	BPG	PPG
2000–01	Verviers-Pepinster	Ethias League	6	?	.571	--	1.000	1.0	.0	.0	.3	1.7
2001–02	Verviers-Pepinster	Ethias League	24	?	.473	.278	.710	2.9	.5	.7	.3	4.0
2002–03	Verviers-Pepinster	Ethias League	25	?	.494	.206	.642	7.4	1.4	1.0	.4	8.8
2003–04	Verviers-Pepinster	Ethias League	18	?	.521	.414	.714	9.6	1.2	.0	.0	10.2
2004–05	Real Madrid	ACB	39	18.6	.518	.213	.581	5.3	.4	1.1	.4	6.3
2005–06	Real Madrid	ACB	32	23.9	.534	.355	.719	5.3	.9	.8	.4	8.5
2006–07	Real Madrid	ACB	47	24.3	.562	.331	.826	6.0	1.2	1.2	.7	9.5
2007–08	Real Madrid	ACB	36	21.7	.680	.324	.762	5.4	1.0	.8	.7	9.4
2008–09	Real Madrid	ACB	35	20.7	.578	.330	.681	4.5	1.1	1.3	.5	8.1
2009–10	Real Madrid	ACB	7	12.3	.308	.250	1.000	2.6	.9	.4	.1	1.9
2009–10	Bilbao Basket	ACB	18	23.6	.620	.191	.806	5.1	2.2	1.4	.9	7.8
2010–11	Bilbao Basket	ACB	39	21.6	.543	.233	.636	5.3	1.5	1.0	.2	6.7
2011–12	Bilbao Basket	ACB	30	17.4	.455	.278	.578	3.3	1.0	.5	.2	4.7
2012–13	Bilbao Basket	ACB	36	24.2	.541	.362	.804	4.4	1.7	.9	.3	7.9
2013–14	Bilbao Basket	ACB	28	22.6	.554	.342	.776	6.1	1.3	1.0	.2	7.2
2014–15	Bilbao Basket	ACB	30	25.3	.505	.414	.762	5.2	1.3	1.0	.1	7.7

== Achievements ==
- 2× Liga ACB champion: (2004–05, 2006–07)
- EuroCup champion: (2006–07)
