= Jonathan Tabu =

Belgian basketball player (born 1985)

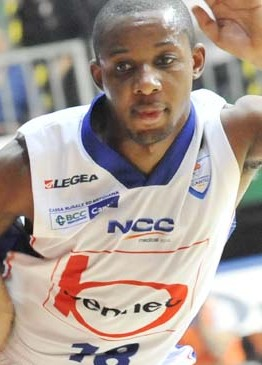
- Tabu defending for Cantù

Personal information
- Born: 7 October 1985 (age 41) Kinshasa, DR Congo
- Listed height: 1.90 m (6 ft 3 in)
- Listed weight: 85 kg (187 lb)

Career information
- NBA draft: 2007: undrafted
- Playing career: 2004–present
- Position: Shooting guard / point guard

Career history
- 2004–2010: Spirou Charleroi
- 2010–2013: Cantù
- 2011–2012: →Vanoli Cremona
- 2013–2014: CAI Zaragoza
- 2014–2015: Alba Berlin
- 2015: Emporio Armani Milano
- 2015–2016: Baloncesto Fuenlabrada
- 2016–2018: Bilbao Basket
- 2018–2019: Le Mans Sarthe
- 2019–2020: ESSM Le Portel
- 2020–2021: Manresa
- 2021–2022: Champagne Châlons-Reims
- 2022: Limburg United
- 2022: Circus Brussels
- 2022–2023: Vanoli Cremona

Career highlights
- 3× Belgian League champion (2008–2010); 2× Belgian Cup winner (2009, 2022); Italian Supercup winner (2012)

Jonathan Tabu (born 7 October 1985) is a Belgian former professional basketballer. Tabu also represents Belgium in international competition.

== Professional career ==
In 2004 Tabu made the team of Spirou Charleroi, while he also played for the second division team CPH Spirou Gilly. He would win three Belgian Championships with Spirou. He also played in the ULEB Cup/EuroCup with Spirou.

In 2010 Tabu signed with the Serie A team Cantù. In the 2011–12 season he played on loan for Vanoli Cremona. In the 2012–13 season he played in the EuroLeague with Cantù, on 11 November he scored a career high 17 points against Panathinaikos.

For the 2013–14 season Tabu signed in Spain with CAI Zaragoza.

On 4 August 2014 Tabu signed a contract with Alba Berlin. On 28 April 2015 he left Alba and signed with Italian club Emporio Armani Milano for the rest of the 2014–15 Serie A season.

On 28 July 2015 Tabu signed with Fuenlabrada. One year later, he moved to Bilbao Basket.

On 2 November 2018 he signed with Le Mans Sarthe of the French LNB Pro A.

On 2 July 2019 he signed with ESSM Le Portel of the French LNB Pro A.

On 21 July 2020 he signed with Baxi Manresa of the Liga ACB. Tabu averaged 7.3 points and 3.5 assists per game. On 8 December 2021 he signed with Champagne Châlons-Reims of the LNB Pro A. Tabu averaged 3.0 points, 3.5 assists, and 1.3 rebounds per game in four games.

On 3 February 2022 he signed with Limburg United of the BNXT League.

On 3 October 2022 he signed with Circus Brussels of the BNXT League.

On 3 November 2022 he signed with Vanoli Cremona of the Italian Serie A2.

== International career ==
He represented Belgium at the EuroBasket 2015 where they lost to Greece in eighth finals with 75–54. Over 6 tournament games, he averaged 10.0 points, 2.3 rebounds and 2.5 assists.

Tabu also played at EuroBasket 2022. On 1 September he scored a game-winning three pointer to give Belgium a 79–76 overtime win over Georgia.

== Personal life ==
Born in Belgium, Tabu is of Congolese descent.
