= Eugene Jeter =

American-Ukrainian basketball player (born 1983)

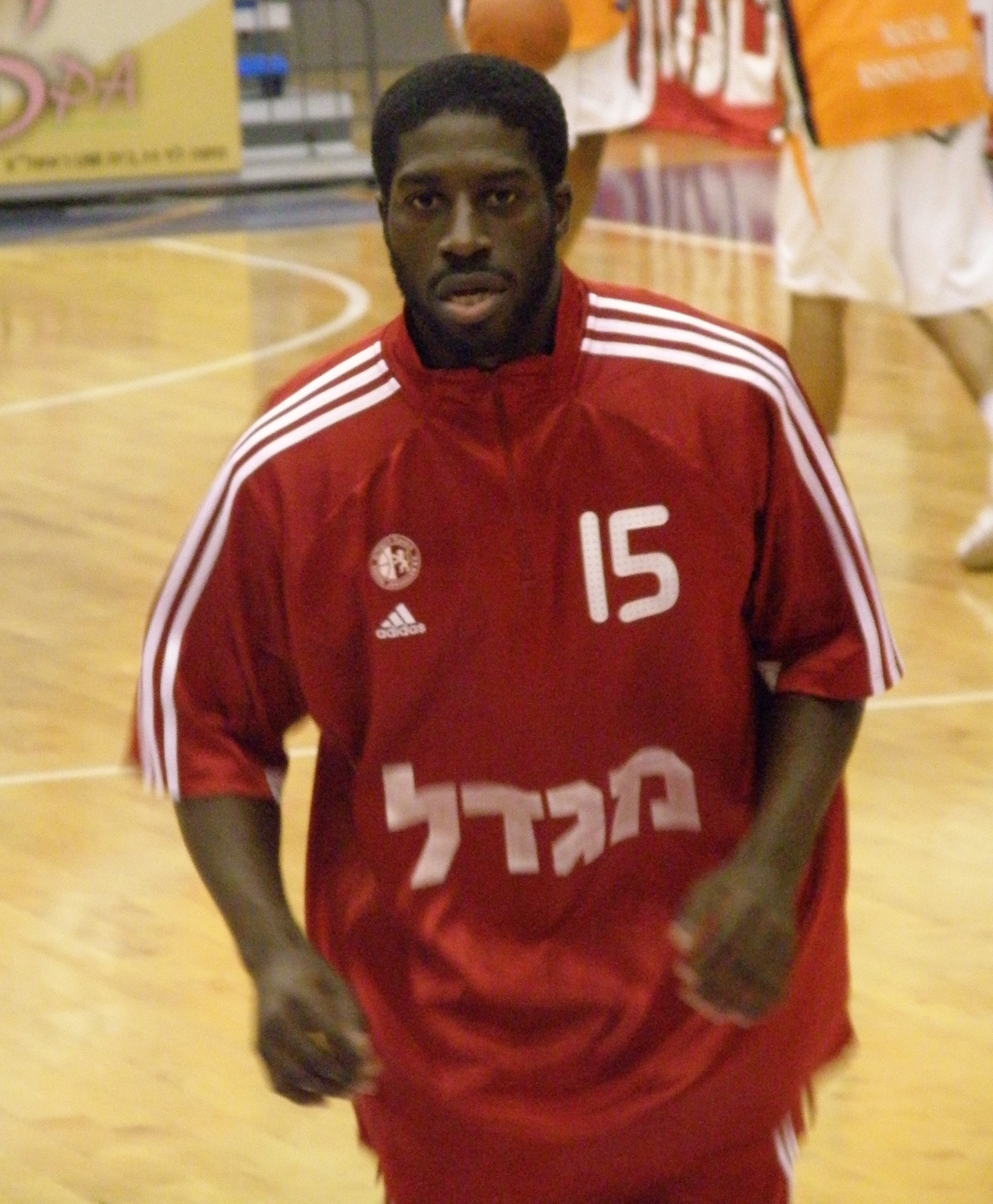
- Jeter playing for Hapoel Jerusalem

Portland Trail Blazers
- Title: Player development coach
- League: NBA

Personal information
- Born: December 2, 1983 (age 42) Los Angeles, California, U.S.
- Listed height: 5 ft 11 in (1.80 m)
- Listed weight: 175 lb (79 kg)

Career information
- High school: Junipero Serra (Gardena, California)
- College: Portland (2002–2006)
- NBA draft: 2006: undrafted
- Playing career: 2006–2023
- Position: Point guard
- Number: 5, 15

Career history
- 2006–2007: Colorado 14ers
- 2007–2008: Kyiv
- 2008–2009: ViveMenorca
- 2009: Unicaja Málaga
- 2009–2010: Hapoel Jerusalem
- 2010–2011: Sacramento Kings
- 2011–2012: Joventut Badalona
- 2012–2016: Shandong Lions / Golden Stars
- 2015: Limoges CSP
- 2016–2018: Tianjin Gold Lions
- 2018–2020: Fujian Sturgeons
- 2021: BC Dnipro
- 2021–2023: NBA G League Ignite

Career highlights
- LNB Pro A champion (2015); CBA All-Star (2013); Israeli Super League Sixth Man of the Year (2010); NBA D-League All-Star (2007); 2× First-team All-WCC (2004, 2006)
- Stats at NBA.com
- Stats at Basketball Reference

Eugene "Pooh" Jeter III (/ˈdʒɛtər/; born December 2, 1983) is an American-born naturalized Ukrainian professional basketball coach, executive and former player, currently serving as a player development coach for the Portland Trail Blazers of the National Basketball Association (NBA) and assistant GM for the Rip City Remix of the NBA G League. He played college basketball for the Portland Pilots and was a naturalized player for the Ukraine national team with his naturalized name being Yudzhin Dzheter (Ukrainian: Юджін Джетер).

== Professional career ==
Jeter went undrafted at the 2006 NBA draft. He played his first professional season with the Colorado 14ers of the NBA D-League.

In August 2007, Jeter moved to Europe and signed a one-year deal with BC Kyiv of Ukraine.

In August 2008, Jeter moved to Spain and signed a one-year deal with ViveMenorca of the Liga ACB.

In September 2009, Jeter signed with Unicaja Málaga. In November 2009, he left Unicaja and signed with Hapoel Jerusalem of Israel for the remainder of the season.

On July 21, 2010, Jeter signed with the Sacramento Kings.

In August 2011, Jeter returned to Spain and signed with Joventut Badalona for the 2011–12 season.

In September 2012, Jeter signed with Shandong Lions of the Chinese Basketball Association. In July 2014, he extended his contract with Shandong for two more years.

On March 21, 2015, Jeter signed with Limoges CSP of France for the rest of the 2014–15 LNB Pro A season.

On July 14, 2015, Jeter re-signed with the Shandong Lions for the 2015–16 season.

In October 2016, Jeter signed with Tianjin Gold Lions for the 2016–17 CBA season. On April 11, 2017, he signed with Turkish club Beşiktaş for the rest of the 2016–17 Basketbol Süper Ligi season. However he did not play for them because Beşiktaş was banned by FIBA from registering new players and the deal could not be completed.

On January 1, 2021, Jeter signed with BC Dnipro of the Ukrainian Basketball SuperLeague.

On October 28, 2021, Jeter signed with the NBA G League Ignite. On June 9, 2023, he announced his retirement.

== International career ==
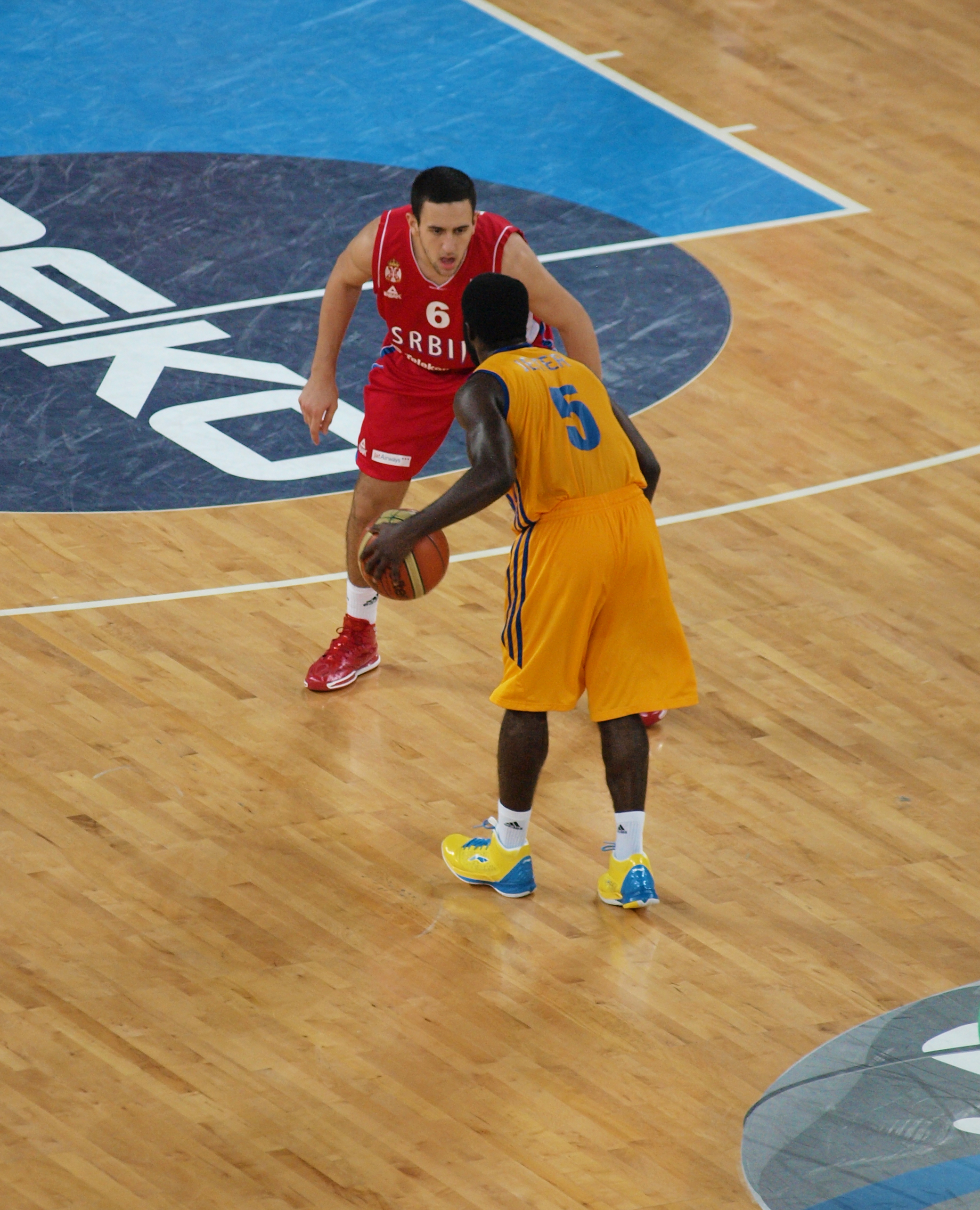
Jeter versus Vasilije Micić as Ukraine plays Serbia in Eurobasket 2013.

In 2013, Jeter helped the senior Ukrainian national basketball team qualify for the FIBA World Cup for the first time since the Soviet Union broke apart, by being the team's leader in assists during the 2013 EuroBasket tournament, with an average of 4.1 assists per game.

== Coaching and executive career ==
On June 9, 2023, Jeter was hired as a player development coach for the Portland Trail Blazers and as an assistant GM for the Rip City Remix.

== Personal life ==
Jeter is the younger brother of sprinter Carmelita Jeter, a two-time IAAF World Athletics Final gold medalist.

== Career statistics ==
Legend
GP	Games played	GS	Games started	MPG	Minutes per game
FG%	Field-goal percentage	3P%	3-point field-goal percentage	FT%	Free-throw percentage
RPG	Rebounds per game	APG	Assists per game	SPG	Steals per game
BPG	Blocks per game	PPG	Points per game	PIR	Performance index rating
**Bold**	Career high

=== NBA ===
==== Regular season ====
Year	Team	GP	GS	MPG	FG%	3P%	FT%	RPG	APG	SPG	BPG	PPG
2010–11	Sacramento	62	1	13.8	.409	.200	.902	1.1	2.6	.5	.0	4.1
Career		62	1	13.8	.409	.200	.902	1.1	2.6	.5	.0	4.1

=== EuroLeague ===
Year	Team	GP	GS	MPG	FG%	3P%	FT%	RPG	APG	SPG	BPG	PPG	PIR
2009–10	Unicaja	3	1	14.9	.333	.111	.500	.3	1.7	.3	.0	5.3	1.7
Career		3	1	14.9	.333	.111	.500	.3	1.7	.3	.0	5.3	1.7
