= Alexis Ajinça =

French basketball player (born 1988)

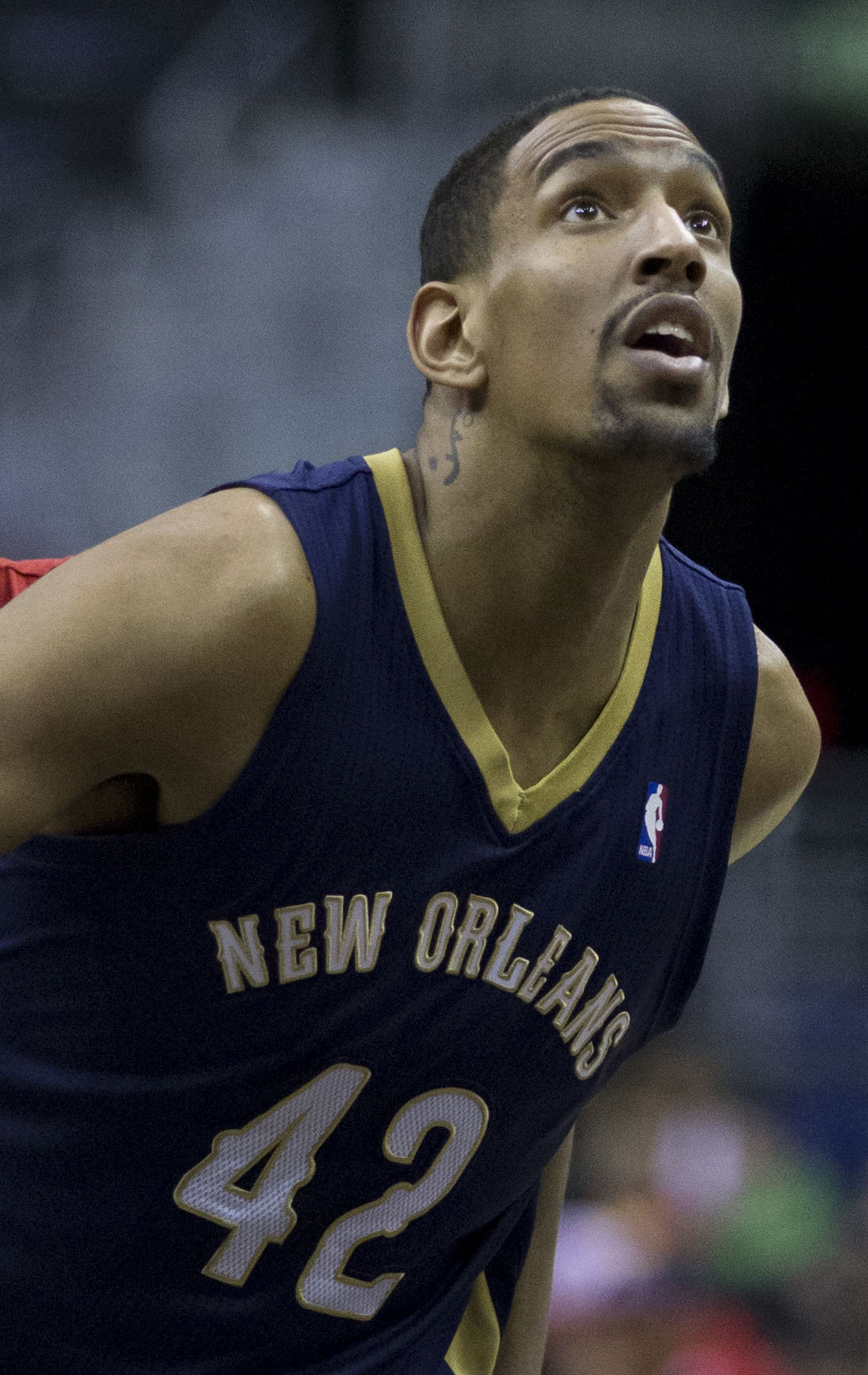
- Ajinça with the New Orleans Pelicans in 2014

Washington Wizards
- Title: Assistant coach
- League: NBA

Personal information
- Born: 6 May 1988 (age 38) Saint-Étienne, France
- Listed height: 7 ft 2 in (2.18 m)
- Listed weight: 248 lb (112 kg)

Career information
- High school: INSEP (Paris, France)
- NBA draft: 2008: 1st round, 20th overall pick
- Drafted by: Charlotte Bobcats
- Playing career: 2006–2019
- Position: Center
- Number: 8, 21, 42
- Coaching career: 2023–present

Career history

Playing
- 2006–2007: Pau-Orthez
- 2007–2008: Hyères-Toulon
- 2008–2010: Charlotte Bobcats
- 2009: →Sioux Falls Skyforce
- 2009–2010: →Maine Red Claws
- 2010–2011: Dallas Mavericks
- 2011: Toronto Raptors
- 2011: Hyères-Toulon
- 2011–2013: SIG Strasbourg
- 2013–2018: New Orleans Pelicans
- 2018–2019: ASVEL Basket

Coaching
- 2023–2024: Capital City Go-Go (assistant)
- 2024–present: Washington Wizards (assistant)

Career highlights
- All-French League First Team (2013); LNB Pro A All-Star (2013); All-French League Third Team (2012); All-French League Defensive Team (2012); 2× All-French League Domestic Team (2012, 2013); NBA D-League All-Star (2010); French Cup winner (2007); Albert Schweitzer Tournament Most Talented Player (2006)

Career statistics
- Points: 1,553 (5.3 ppg)
- Rebounds: 1,150 (3.9 rpg)
- Blocks: 181 (.6 bpg)
- Stats at NBA.com
- Stats at Basketball Reference

Alexis Ajinça (French pronunciation: [alɛksi aʒɛ̃sa]; born 6 May 1988) is a French former professional basketball player who is currently an assistant coach for the Washington Wizards of the National Basketball Association (NBA). He played seven seasons in the league for the Charlotte Bobcats, Dallas Mavericks, Toronto Raptors and New Orleans Pelicans.

== Early life ==
Ajinça was a promising BMX rider during his childhood and routinely won racing competitions for his age group in France. He started playing basketball at age of 12 because he thought that it would help him improve his bike jumps. Ajinça gave up BMX riding when he blossomed in basketball.

== Professional career ==
=== Early years (2006–2008) ===
After attending France's INSEP, Ajinça played for Pau-Orthez during the 2006–07 season. He joined Hyères-Toulon for the 2007–08 season and averaged 5.0 points and 3.1 rebounds per game.

=== Charlotte Bobcats (2008–2010) ===
Ajinça was selected with the 20th overall pick in the 2008 NBA draft by the Charlotte Bobcats. The Bobcats wanted to select a big man after selecting guard D. J. Augustin earlier in the draft and believed that Ajinça possessed the most potential of players available.

During his rookie season, he spent time with the Sioux Falls Skyforce of the NBA Development League. During his second season with Charlotte, he spent time with the Maine Red Claws.

=== Dallas Mavericks (2010–2011) ===
On 13 July 2010, Ajinça was traded, along with Tyson Chandler, to the Dallas Mavericks in exchange for Erick Dampier, Eduardo Nájera, Matt Carroll.

=== Toronto Raptors (2011) ===
On 24 January 2011, Ajinça was traded, along with a future second-round draft pick and cash considerations, to the Toronto Raptors in exchange for the draft rights to Georgios Printezis.

=== Return to France (2011–2013) ===
On 2 November 2011, Ajinça joined Paris-Levallois for a one-week tryout. He left the team on 8 November and joined Hyères-Toulon two days later. He appeared in just two games with Hyères-Toulon before parting ways with the team.

After failing to make a return to the NBA following the conclusion of the NBA lockout, Ajinça returned to France and signed with SIG Strasbourg on 29 December 2011. On 13 August 2012, he re-signed with Strasbourg for the 2012–13 season. On 6 August 2013, he re-signed with Strasbourg for the 2013–14 season. On 18 December 2013, he left Strasbourg to return to the NBA.

=== New Orleans Pelicans (2013–2018) ===
On 20 December 2013, Ajinça signed with the New Orleans Pelicans. On 9 July 2015, he re-signed with the Pelicans. On 8 April 2016, he recorded career highs with 28 points and 15 rebounds in a 110–102 win over the Los Angeles Lakers.

On 7 December 2017, after missing all of the 2017–18 season up to that point, Ajinça was ruled out for the rest of the season after undergoing surgery on his right patellar tendon, an injury that typically takes four to six months to recover.

On 15 October 2018, Ajinça was traded to the Los Angeles Clippers in exchange for Wesley Johnson. He was waived by the Clippers immediately upon being acquired.

=== ASVEL (2018–2019) ===
On 28 December 2018, Ajinça returned to France and signed with ASVEL Basket.

== Coaching career ==
On 13 October 2023, Ajinça was hired as an assistant coach by the Capital City Go-Go of the NBA G League.

On 10 July 2024, Ajinça became an assistant coach for the Washington Wizards.

== National team career ==
In September 2013, Ajinça represented the French national team at EuroBasket 2013 in Slovenia. He averaged 9.1 points and 7.0 rebounds per game.

== Career statistics ==
Legend
GP	Games played	GS	Games started	MPG	Minutes per game
FG%	Field-goal percentage	3P%	3-point field-goal percentage	FT%	Free-throw percentage
RPG	Rebounds per game	APG	Assists per game	SPG	Steals per game
BPG	Blocks per game	PPG	Points per game	PIR	Performance index rating
**Bold**	Career high

=== NBA ===
==== Regular season ====
Year	Team	GP	GS	MPG	FG%	3P%	FT%	RPG	APG	SPG	BPG	PPG
2008–09	Charlotte	31	4	5.9	.362	.000	.714	1.0	.1	.2	.2	2.3
2009–10	Charlotte	6	0	5.0	.500	.000	.000	.7	.0	.2	.2	1.7
2010–11	Dallas	10	2	7.5	.375	**.429**	.667	1.7	.2	.3	.5	2.9
2010–11	Toronto	24	0	11.0	.465	.333	.733	2.5	.3	.3	.6	4.8
2013–14	New Orleans	56	**30**	**17.0**	.544	.000	.836	**4.9**	**.7**	.4	**.8**	5.9
2014–15	New Orleans	**68**	8	14.1	**.550**	.000	.818	4.6	**.7**	.3	**.8**	**6.5**
2015–16	New Orleans	59	17	14.6	.476	.000	**.839**	4.6	.5	.3	.6	6.0
2016–17	New Orleans	39	15	15.0	.500	.000	.725	4.5	.3	**.5**	.6	5.3
Career		293	76	13.3	.503	.286	.797	3.9	.5	.3	.6	5.3

==== Playoffs ====
Year	Team	GP	GS	MPG	FG%	3P%	FT%	RPG	APG	SPG	BPG	PPG
2015	New Orleans	3	0	3.3	1.000	.000	.000	.3	.3	.3	.0	2.7
Career		3	0	3.3	1.000	.000	.000	.3	.3	.3	.0	2.7

=== EuroLeague ===
Year	Team	GP	GS	MPG	FG%	3P%	FT%	RPG	APG	SPG	BPG	PPG	PIR
2006–07	Pau-Orthez	2	0	4.2	.000	.000	.000	1.5	.0	.0	.0	.0	-3.0
2013–14	SIG Strasbourg	**9**	**9**	**25.5**	**.553**	.000	**.757**	**5.4**	**1.7**	**.9**	**.9**	**17.1**	**17.2**
Career		11	9	21.6	.534	.000	.757	4.7	1.4	.7	.7	14.0	13.5

== Personal life ==
Ajinça and his wife Courtney have two sons, Carter and Caysen. His cousin, Melvin Ajinça, is a professional basketball player.

== See also ==
- List of European basketball players in the United States
