= EuroBasket 2022 squads =

This article displays the squads of the teams that competed in EuroBasket 2022. Each team consisted of 12 players.

Age and club as of the start of the tournament, 1 September 2022.

== Group A ==
=== Belgium ===
The squad was announced on 31 August 2022.

Belgium men's national basketball team – EuroBasket 2022 roster
Players
Coaches

Pos.	No.	Name	Age – Date of birth	Height	Club	Ctr.
SG	4	Manu Lecomte	27 – 16 August 1995	1.80 m (5 ft 11 in)	BC Jonava	(Lithuania)
SF	8	Jean-Marc Mwema	32 – 5 December 1989	1.98 m (6 ft 6 in)	Antwerp Giants	(Belgium)
PG	9	Jonathan Tabu	36 – 7 October 1985	1.90 m (6 ft 3 in)	Limburg United	(Belgium)
PF	13	Pierre-Antoine Gillet	31 – 16 April 1991	2.01 m (6 ft 7 in)	Oostende	(Belgium)
PF	14	Maxime De Zeeuw (C)	35 – 26 April 1987	2.04 m (6 ft 8 in)	Limburg United	(Belgium)
C	16	Kevin Tumba	31 – 23 February 1991	2.06 m (6 ft 9 in)	Brussels	(Belgium)
SF	17	Hans Vanwijn	27 – 15 February 1995	2.07 m (6 ft 9 in)	Nanterre 92	(France)
SG	18	Alexandre Libert	32 – 25 January 1990	1.87 m (6 ft 2 in)	Spirou Charleroi	(Belgium)
C	19	Ismaël Bako	26 – 10 October 1995	2.08 m (6 ft 10 in)	Virtus Bologna	(Italy)
PF	21	Vrenz Bleijenbergh	21 – 14 October 2000	2.08 m (6 ft 10 in)	Oostende	(Belgium)
C	25	Haris Bratanovic	21 – 20 April 2001	2.08 m (6 ft 10 in)	Oostende	(Belgium)
PG	32	Retin Obasohan	29 – 6 July 1993	1.86 m (6 ft 1 in)	ASVEL	(France)

Head coach

- (Belgium) Dario Gjergja

Assistant coach(es)

- (Belgium) Frédéric Wilmot

Legend

- (C) Team captain
- Club – describes last club
  before the tournament
- Age – describes age
  on 1 September 2022

=== Bulgaria ===
The squad was announced on 30 August 2022.

Bulgaria men's national basketball team – EuroBasket 2022 roster
Players
Coaches

Pos.	No.	Name	Age – Date of birth	Height	Club	Ctr.
SF	0	Ivan Alipiev	23 – 28 July 1999	2.00 m (6 ft 7 in)	Latina	(Italy)
PG	1	Dee Bost	32 – 12 October 1989	1.88 m (6 ft 2 in)	Galatasaray	(Turkey)
PG	2	Deyan Karamfilov	28 – 21 January 1994	1.80 m (5 ft 11 in)	Rilski Sportist	(Bulgaria)
SG	9	Chavdar Kostov (C)	34 – 18 April 1988	1.95 m (6 ft 5 in)	Rilski Sportist	(Bulgaria)
SF	12	Aleksandar Yanev	32 – 20 January 1990	2.03 m (6 ft 8 in)	Rilski Sportist	(Bulgaria)
C	17	Emil Stoilov	20 – 7 February 2002	2.12 m (6 ft 11 in)	Estudiantes	(Spain)
SG	22	Pavlin Ivanov	29 – 28 March 1993	1.95 m (6 ft 5 in)	Balkan	(Bulgaria)
PG	23	Stanimir Marinov	30 – 7 September 1991	1.92 m (6 ft 4 in)	Balkan	(Bulgaria)
C	24	Andrey Ivanov	26 – 7 May 1996	2.05 m (6 ft 9 in)	CSKA Sofia	(Bulgaria)
PF	34	Dimitar Dimitrov	29 – 1 March 1993	2.03 m (6 ft 8 in)	Balkan	(Bulgaria)
PF	41	Aleksandar Vezenkov	27 – 6 August 1995	2.06 m (6 ft 9 in)	Olympiacos	(Greece)
PF	99	Alex Simeonov	29 – 28 March 1993	2.00 m (6 ft 7 in)	CSKA Sofia	(Bulgaria)

Head coach

- (Bulgaria) Rosen Barchovski

Assistant coach(es)

- (Bulgaria) Dimitar Angelov
- (Bulgaria) Vasil Hristov

Legend

- (C) Team captain
- Club – describes last club
  before the tournament
- Age – describes age
  on 1 September 2022

=== Georgia ===
The squad was announced on 31 August 2022.

Georgia men's national basketball team – EuroBasket 2022 roster
Players
Coaches

Pos.	No.	Name	Age – Date of birth	Height	Club	Ctr.
PG	4	Rati Andronikashvili	21 – 19 March 2001	1.96 m (6 ft 5 in)	Creighton Bluejays	(United States)
F	5	Sandro Mamukelashvili	23 – 23 May 1999	2.11 m (6 ft 11 in)	Milwaukee Bucks	(United States)
SG	6	Kakhaber Jintcharadze	29 – 16 July 1993	1.95 m (6 ft 5 in)	Olimpi Tbilisi	(Georgia (country))
PF	7	Beka Burjanadze	28 – 3 January 1994	2.03 m (6 ft 8 in)	Real Betis	(Spain)
PG	8	Giorgi Tsintsadze	36 – 7 February 1986	1.92 m (6 ft 4 in)	US Monastir	(Tunisia)
C	9	Giorgi Shermadini (C)	33 – 2 April 1989	2.16 m (7 ft 1 in)	Tenerife	(Spain)
SG	10	Duda Sanadze	30 – 25 July 1992	1.96 m (6 ft 5 in)	Borac Čačak	(Serbia)
SF	17	Mikheil Berishvili	35 – 12 April 1987	2.03 m (6 ft 8 in)	Air Defence SC	(Iraq)
SG	18	Merab Bokolishvili	30 – 27 February 1992	1.94 m (6 ft 4 in)	Rustavi	(Georgia (country))
PG	25	Thad McFadden	35 – 29 May 1987	1.88 m (6 ft 2 in)	Murcia	(Spain)
PF	33	Beka Bekauri	31 – 18 January 1991	2.07 m (6 ft 9 in)	TSU Tbilisi	(Georgia (country))
C	35	Goga Bitadze	23 – 20 July 1999	2.13 m (7 ft 0 in)	Indiana Pacers	(United States)

Head coach

- (Greece) Ilias Zouros

Assistant coach(es)

- (Serbia) Miloš Gligorijević
- (Greece) Georgios Limniatis

Legend

- (C) Team captain
- Club – describes last club
  before the tournament
- Age – describes age
  on 1 September 2022

=== Montenegro ===
The squad was announced on 30 August 2022.

Montenegro men's national basketball team – EuroBasket 2022 roster
Players
Coaches

Pos.	No.	Name	Age – Date of birth	Height	Club	Ctr.
SF	0	Zoran Vučeljić	18 – 9 September 2003	1.97 m (6 ft 6 in)	Derby	(Montenegro)
PF	2	Aleksa Ilić	25 – 17 September 1996	2.04 m (6 ft 8 in)	Budućnost	(Montenegro)
SG	3	Vladimir Mihailović	32 – 10 August 1990	1.93 m (6 ft 4 in)	Mornar	(Montenegro)
PG	4	Nikola Pavličević	34 – 13 August 1988	1.92 m (6 ft 4 in)	Derby	(Montenegro)
F	8	Dino Radončić	23 – 8 January 1999	2.02 m (6 ft 8 in)	Zaragoza	(Spain)
C	9	Marko Simonović	22 – 15 October 1999	2.14 m (7 ft 0 in)	Chicago Bulls	(United States)
PF	11	Nemanja Radović	30 – 11 November 1991	2.08 m (6 ft 10 in)	Murcia	(Spain)
PF	14	Bojan Dubljević (C)	30 – 24 October 1991	2.05 m (6 ft 9 in)	Valencia	(Spain)
C	19	Zoran Nikolić	26 – 1 April 1996	2.13 m (7 ft 0 in)	Budućnost	(Montenegro)
PG	22	Igor Drobnjak	22 – 21 April 2000	1.93 m (6 ft 4 in)	Budućnost	(Montenegro)
SG	30	Petar Popović	25 – 13 September 1996	1.95 m (6 ft 5 in)	Budućnost	(Montenegro)
PG	55	Kendrick Perry	29 – 23 December 1992	1.83 m (6 ft 0 in)	Málaga	(Spain)

Head coach

- (Montenegro) Boško Radović

Assistant coach(es)

- (Montenegro) Vladimir Todorović

Legend

- (C) Team captain
- Club – describes last club
  before the tournament
- Age – describes age
  on 1 September 2022

=== Spain ===
The squad was announced on 30 August 2022.

Spain men's national basketball team – EuroBasket 2022 roster
Players
Coaches

Pos.	No.	Name	Age – Date of birth	Height	Club	Ctr.
G	2	Lorenzo Brown	32 – 26 August 1990	1.96 m (6 ft 5 in)	Maccabi Tel Aviv	(Israel)
F/C	4	Jaime Pradilla	21 – 3 January 2001	2.05 m (6 ft 9 in)	Valencia	(Spain)
G/F	5	Rudy Fernández (C)	37 – 4 April 1985	1.96 m (6 ft 5 in)	Real Madrid	(Spain)
SF	6	Xabier López-Arostegui	25 – 19 May 1997	2.01 m (6 ft 7 in)	Valencia	(Spain)
G	7	Jaime Fernández	29 – 4 June 1993	1.86 m (6 ft 1 in)	Tenerife	(Spain)
SG	8	Darío Brizuela	27 – 8 November 1994	1.88 m (6 ft 2 in)	Unicaja	(Spain)
G	9	Alberto Díaz	28 – 23 April 1994	1.91 m (6 ft 3 in)	Unicaja	(Spain)
C	11	Sebas Saiz	28 – 15 July 1994	2.05 m (6 ft 9 in)	Alvark	(Japan)
C	14	Willy Hernangómez	28 – 27 May 1994	2.09 m (6 ft 10 in)	New Orleans Pelicans	(United States)
F/C	16	Usman Garuba	20 – 9 March 2002	2.03 m (6 ft 8 in)	Houston Rockets	(United States)
F	41	Juancho Hernangómez	26 – 28 September 1995	2.05 m (6 ft 9 in)	Toronto Raptors	(Canada)
PF	44	Joel Parra	22 – 4 April 2000	2.00 m (6 ft 7 in)	Joventut	(Spain)

Head coach

- (Italy) Sergio Scariolo

Assistant coach(es)

- (Spain) Luis Guil
- (Spain) Ángel Sánchez-Cañete

Legend

- (C) Team captain
- Club – describes last club
  before the tournament
- Age – describes age
  on 1 September 2022

=== Turkey ===
The squad was announced on 29 August 2022.

Turkey men's national basketball team – EuroBasket 2022 roster
Players
Coaches

Pos.	No.	Name	Age – Date of birth	Height	Club	Ctr.
PG	0	Shane Larkin	29 – 2 October 1992	1.82 m (6 ft 0 in)	Anadolu Efes	(Turkey)
SG	2	Şehmus Hazer	23 – 15 February 1999	1.90 m (6 ft 3 in)	Fenerbahçe	(Turkey)
PF	3	Yiğitcan Saybir	23 – 27 February 1999	2.01 m (6 ft 7 in)	Bursaspor	(Turkey)
SF	5	Onuralp Bitim	23 – 31 March 1999	1.96 m (6 ft 5 in)	Bursaspor	(Turkey)
SF	6	Cedi Osman	27 – 8 April 1995	2.00 m (6 ft 7 in)	Cleveland Cavaliers	(United States)
SG	10	Melih Mahmutoğlu (C)	32 – 12 May 1990	1.91 m (6 ft 3 in)	Fenerbahçe	(Turkey)
PF	12	Sadık Emir Kabaca	21 – 13 December 2000	2.07 m (6 ft 9 in)	Galatasaray	(Turkey)
C	15	Sertaç Şanlı	31 – 5 August 1991	2.14 m (7 ft 0 in)	FC Barcelona	(Spain)
SG	19	Buğrahan Tuncer	29 – 23 March 1993	1.94 m (6 ft 4 in)	Anadolu Efes	(Turkey)
SG	22	Furkan Korkmaz	25 – 24 July 1997	2.00 m (6 ft 7 in)	Philadelphia 76ers	(United States)
PF	23	Alperen Şengün	20 – 25 July 2002	2.06 m (6 ft 9 in)	Houston Rockets	(United States)
C	24	Ercan Osmani	24 – 4 August 1998	2.13 m (7 ft 0 in)	Darüşşafaka	(Turkey)

Head coach

- (Turkey) Ergin Ataman

Assistant coach(es)

- (Turkey) Ender Arslan
- (Turkey) Hakan Demir

Legend

- (C) Team captain
- Club – describes last club
  before the tournament
- Age – describes age
  on 1 September 2022

== Group B ==
=== Bosnia and Herzegovina ===
The squad was announced on 29 August 2022.

Bosnia and Herzegovina men's national basketball team – EuroBasket 2022 roster
Players
Coaches

Pos.	No.	Name	Age – Date of birth	Height	Club	Ctr.
C	0	Jusuf Nurkić	28 – 23 August 1994	2.13 m (7 ft 0 in)	Portland Trail Blazers	(United States)
PG	2	John Roberson	33 – 28 October 1988	1.80 m (5 ft 11 in)	Manisa BB	(Turkey)
SG	5	Edin Atić	25 – 19 January 1997	2.01 m (6 ft 7 in)	Budućnost	(Montenegro)
PF	7	Miralem Halilović (C)	31 – 22 July 1991	2.05 m (6 ft 9 in)	Nanterre 92	(France)
G	9	Amar Gegić	24 – 14 February 1998	2.00 m (6 ft 7 in)	Paris	(France)
C	11	Kenan Kamenjaš	22 – 17 January 2000	2.05 m (6 ft 9 in)	Budućnost	(Montenegro)
PG	12	Sani Čampara	23 – 3 March 1999	1.90 m (6 ft 3 in)	Zadar	(Croatia)
SF	13	Džanan Musa	23 – 8 May 1999	2.02 m (6 ft 8 in)	Real Madrid	(Spain)
SF	15	Ajdin Penava	25 – 11 March 1997	2.06 m (6 ft 9 in)	Mons-Hainaut	(Belgium)
SF	17	Aleksandar Lazić	26 – 10 June 1996	2.01 m (6 ft 7 in)	Budućnost	(Montenegro)
SF	22	Emir Sulejmanović	27 – 13 July 1995	2.04 m (6 ft 8 in)	Bilbao	(Spain)
SF	27	Adin Vrabac	28 – 27 January 1994	2.05 m (6 ft 9 in)	Mons-Hainaut	(Belgium)

Head coach

- (Bosnia and Herzegovina) Adis Bećiragić

Assistant coach(es)

- (Bosnia and Herzegovina) Alen Abaz
- (Bosnia and Herzegovina) Gordan Firić

Legend

- (C) Team captain
- Club – describes last club
  before the tournament
- Age – describes age
  on 1 September 2022

=== France ===
The squad was announced on 31 August 2022.

France men's national basketball team – EuroBasket 2022 roster
Players
Coaches

Pos.	No.	Name	Age – Date of birth	Height	Club	Ctr.
G	0	Élie Okobo	24 – 23 October 1997	1.90 m (6 ft 3 in)	Monaco	(Monaco)
PF	2	Amath M'Baye	32 – 14 December 1989	2.06 m (6 ft 9 in)	Anadolu Efes	(Turkey)
G/F	3	Timothé Luwawu-Cabarrot	27 – 9 May 1995	1.98 m (6 ft 6 in)	Atlanta Hawks	(United States)
PG	4	Thomas Heurtel	33 – 10 April 1989	1.88 m (6 ft 2 in)	Real Madrid	(Spain)
PF	7	Guerschon Yabusele	26 – 17 December 1995	2.03 m (6 ft 8 in)	Real Madrid	(Spain)
G/F	10	Evan Fournier (C)	29 – 29 October 1992	1.99 m (6 ft 6 in)	New York Knicks	(United States)
PG	11	Théo Maledon	21 – 12 June 2001	1.91 m (6 ft 3 in)	Oklahoma City Thunder	(United States)
C	17	Vincent Poirier	28 – 17 October 1993	2.13 m (7 ft 0 in)	Real Madrid	(Spain)
PG	21	Andrew Albicy	32 – 21 March 1990	1.78 m (5 ft 10 in)	Gran Canaria	(Spain)
SF	22	Terry Tarpey	28 – 2 March 1994	1.96 m (6 ft 5 in)	Le Mans	(France)
C	27	Rudy Gobert	30 – 26 June 1992	2.15 m (7 ft 1 in)	Minnesota Timberwolves	(United States)
C	93	Moustapha Fall	30 – 23 February 1992	2.18 m (7 ft 2 in)	Olympiacos	(Greece)

Head coach

- (France) Vincent Collet

Assistant coach(es)

- (France) Pascal Donnadieu
- (France) Laurent Foirest

Legend

- (C) Team captain
- Club – describes last club
  before the tournament
- Age – describes age
  on 1 September 2022

=== Germany ===
The squad was announced on 31 August 2022.

Germany men's national basketball team – EuroBasket 2022 roster
Players
Coaches

Pos.	No.	Name	Age – Date of birth	Height	Club	Ctr.
G	4	Maodo Lô	29 – 31 December 1992	1.92 m (6 ft 4 in)	Alba Berlin	(Germany)
G/F	5	Niels Giffey	31 – 8 June 1991	2.00 m (6 ft 7 in)	Žalgiris	(Lithuania)
G/F	6	Nick Weiler-Babb	26 – 12 December 1995	1.96 m (6 ft 5 in)	Bayern Munich	(Germany)
F/C	7	Johannes Voigtmann	29 – 30 September 1992	2.09 m (6 ft 10 in)	CSKA Moscow	(Russia)
F	9	Franz Wagner	21 – 27 August 2001	2.08 m (6 ft 10 in)	Orlando Magic	(United States)
F/C	10	Daniel Theis	30 – 4 April 1992	2.04 m (6 ft 8 in)	Indiana Pacers	(United States)
PG	17	Dennis Schröder (C)	28 – 15 September 1993	1.88 m (6 ft 2 in)	Houston Rockets	(United States)
C	18	Jonas Wohlfarth-Bottermann	32 – 20 February 1990	2.08 m (6 ft 10 in)	Hamburg Towers	(Germany)
PG	21	Justus Hollatz	21 – 21 April 2001	1.91 m (6 ft 3 in)	Breogán	(Spain)
F/C	32	Johannes Thiemann	28 – 9 February 1994	2.05 m (6 ft 9 in)	Alba Berlin	(Germany)
G	42	Andreas Obst	26 – 13 July 1996	1.91 m (6 ft 3 in)	Bayern Munich	(Germany)
PF	43	Christian Sengfelder	27 – 28 February 1995	2.02 m (6 ft 8 in)	Brose Bamberg	(Germany)

Head coach

- (Canada) Gordon Herbert

Assistant coach(es)

- (Australia) Alan Ibrahimagić
- (Germany) Klaus Perwas

Legend

- Club – describes last club
  before the tournament
- Age – describes age
  on 1 September 2022

=== Hungary ===
The squad was announced on 31 August 2022.

Hungary men's national basketball team – EuroBasket 2022 roster
Players
Coaches

Pos.	No.	Name	Age – Date of birth	Height	Club	Ctr.
C	1	Mikael Hopkins	29 – 23 June 1993	2.06 m (6 ft 9 in)	Reggiana	(Italy)
F	5	Rosco Allen	29 – 5 May 1993	2.06 m (6 ft 9 in)	Niigata Albirex	(Japan)
PF	6	Ákos Keller (C)	33 – 28 March 1989	2.08 m (6 ft 10 in)	Falco	(Hungary)
G	8	Ádám Hanga	33 – 12 April 1989	1.99 m (6 ft 6 in)	Real Madrid	(Spain)
G	9	Dávid Vojvoda	31 – 4 September 1990	1.96 m (6 ft 5 in)	Alba Fehérvár	(Hungary)
F	11	Szilárd Benke	27 – 22 May 1995	1.96 m (6 ft 5 in)	BCM Gravelines-Dunkerque	(France)
F	12	Ádám Somogyi	22 – 30 June 2000	1.90 m (6 ft 3 in)	Alba Fehérvár	(Hungary)
PF	14	György Golomán	26 – 2 April 1996	2.11 m (6 ft 11 in)	7Bet-Lietkabelis	(Lithuania)
F	15	Csaba Ferencz	37 – 24 May 1985	1.95 m (6 ft 5 in)	Körmend	(Hungary)
F	20	Zoltán Perl	27 – 28 July 1995	1.95 m (6 ft 5 in)	Falco	(Hungary)
PF	22	János Eilingsfeld	31 – 5 February 1991	1.98 m (6 ft 6 in)	Atomerőmű	(Hungary)
G	25	Benedek Váradi	27 – 5 February 1995	1.94 m (6 ft 4 in)	Rytas Vilnius	(Lithuania)

Head coach

- (Montenegro) Stojan Ivković

Assistant coach(es)

- (Hungary) Péter Pór
- (Hungary) Kornél Váradi

Legend

- (C) Team captain
- Club – describes last
  club before the competition
- Age – describes age
  on 1 September 2022

=== Lithuania ===
The squad was announced on 27 August 2022.

Lithuania men's national basketball team – EuroBasket 2022 roster
Players
Coaches

Pos.	No.	Name	Age – Date of birth	Height	Club	Ctr.
F	4	Eigirdas Žukauskas	30 – 3 June 1992	2.04 m (6 ft 8 in)	Wolves	(Lithuania)
G/F	9	Ignas Brazdeikis	23 – 8 January 1999	1.98 m (6 ft 6 in)	Žalgiris	(Lithuania)
F/C	11	Domantas Sabonis	26 – 3 May 1996	2.11 m (6 ft 11 in)	Sacramento Kings	(United States)
PG	13	Rokas Jokubaitis	21 – 19 November 2000	1.93 m (6 ft 4 in)	FC Barcelona	(Spain)
C	14	Martynas Echodas	25 – 7 July 1997	2.06 m (6 ft 9 in)	Rytas	(Lithuania)
C	17	Jonas Valančiūnas (C)	30 – 6 May 1992	2.11 m (6 ft 11 in)	New Orleans Pelicans	(United States)
F	19	Mindaugas Kuzminskas	32 – 19 October 1989	2.06 m (6 ft 9 in)	Zenit	(Russia)
G	30	Kristupas Žemaitis	26 – 24 June 1996	1.92 m (6 ft 4 in)	Wolves	(Lithuania)
SF	31	Rokas Giedraitis	30 – 16 August 1992	2.00 m (6 ft 7 in)	Baskonia	(Spain)
SG	40	Marius Grigonis	28 – 26 April 1994	1.98 m (6 ft 6 in)	Panathinaikos	(Greece)
PG	43	Lukas Lekavičius	28 – 30 March 1994	1.84 m (6 ft 0 in)	Žalgiris	(Lithuania)
SF	51	Arnas Butkevičius	29 – 22 October 1992	1.96 m (6 ft 5 in)	Žalgiris	(Lithuania)

Head coach

- (Lithuania) Kazys Maksvytis

Assistant coach(es)

- (Lithuania) Kęstutis Kemzūra
- (Lithuania) Giedrius Žibėnas

Legend

- (C) Team captains
- Club – describes last club
  before the tournament
- Age – describes age
  on 1 September 2022

=== Slovenia ===
The squad was announced on 29 August 2022.

Slovenia men's national basketball team – EuroBasket 2022 roster
Players
Coaches

Pos.	No.	Name	Age – Date of birth	Height	Club	Ctr.
PG	3	Goran Dragić (C)	36 – 6 May 1986	1.90 m (6 ft 3 in)	Chicago Bulls	(United States)
PG	4	Žiga Samar	21 – 26 January 2001	1.98 m (6 ft 6 in)	Hamburg Towers	(Germany)
PG	5	Luka Rupnik	29 – 20 May 1993	1.86 m (6 ft 1 in)	Yalovaspor	(Turkey)
PG	6	Aleksej Nikolić	27 – 21 February 1995	1.91 m (6 ft 3 in)	San Pablo Burgos	(Spain)
SG	7	Klemen Prepelič	29 – 20 October 1992	1.89 m (6 ft 2 in)	Valencia	(Spain)
SF	8	Edo Murić	30 – 27 November 1991	2.02 m (6 ft 8 in)	Cedevita Olimpija	(Slovenia)
C	10	Mike Tobey	27 – 10 October 1994	2.13 m (7 ft 0 in)	FC Barcelona	(Spain)
SG	11	Jaka Blažič	32 – 30 June 1990	1.96 m (6 ft 5 in)	Bahçeşehir Koleji	(Turkey)
C	27	Žiga Dimec	29 – 20 February 1993	2.11 m (6 ft 11 in)	Anwil Włocławek	(Poland)
SF	30	Zoran Dragić	33 – 22 June 1989	1.96 m (6 ft 5 in)	Cedevita Olimpija	(Slovenia)
SF	31	Vlatko Čančar	25 – 10 April 1997	2.03 m (6 ft 8 in)	Denver Nuggets	(United States)
SF	77	Luka Dončić	23 – 28 February 1999	2.01 m (6 ft 7 in)	Dallas Mavericks	(United States)

Head coach

- (Slovenia) Aleksander Sekulić

Assistant coach(es)

- (Slovenia) Dalibor Damjanović
- (Slovenia) Jernej Valentinčič

Legend

- (C) Team captain
- Club – describes last club
  before the tournament
- Age – describes age
  on 1 September 2022

== Group C ==
=== Croatia ===
The squad was announced on 21 August 2022.

Croatia men's national basketball team – EuroBasket 2022 roster
Players
Coaches

Pos.	No.	Name	Age – Date of birth	Height	Club	Ctr.
SG	1	Toni Perković	24 – 10 April 1998	1.91 m (6 ft 3 in)	Orléans Loiret	(France)
PG	3	Jaleen Smith	27 – 24 November 1994	1.93 m (6 ft 4 in)	Alba Berlin	(Germany)
PF	4	Roko Prkačin	19 – 26 November 2002	2.01 m (6 ft 7 in)	Girona	(Spain)
SG	7	Krunoslav Simon	37 – 24 June 1985	1.97 m (6 ft 6 in)	Anadolu Efes	(Turkey)
SG	8	Mario Hezonja	27 – 25 February 1995	2.00 m (6 ft 7 in)	Real Madrid	(Spain)
PF	9	Dario Šarić	28 – 8 April 1994	2.07 m (6 ft 9 in)	Phoenix Suns	(United States)
PG	10	Lovro Gnjidić	21 – 18 April 2001	1.98 m (6 ft 6 in)	Cedevita Olimpija	(Slovenia)
PF	17	Karlo Matković	21 – 30 March 2001	2.06 m (6 ft 9 in)	Cedevita Olimpija	(Slovenia)
SF	27	Ivan Ramljak	32 – 9 August 1990	2.03 m (6 ft 8 in)	Śląsk Wrocław	(Poland)
PG	30	Dominik Mavra	28 – 15 June 1994	1.88 m (6 ft 2 in)	Split	(Croatia)
C	40	Ivica Zubac	25 – 18 March 1997	2.16 m (7 ft 1 in)	Los Angeles Clippers	(United States)
SG	44	Bojan Bogdanović (C)	33 – 18 April 1989	2.04 m (6 ft 8 in)	Utah Jazz	(United States)

Head coach

- (Croatia) Damir Mulaomerović

Assistant coach(es)

- (Croatia) Vladimir Krstić
- (Croatia) Dražen Orešković

Legend

- (C) Team captain
- Club – describes last club
  before the tournament
- Age – describes age
  on 1 September 2022

=== Estonia ===
The squad was announced on 30 August 2022.

Estonia men's national basketball team – EuroBasket 2022 roster
Players
Coaches

Pos.	No.	Name	Age – Date of birth	Height	Club	Ctr.
SF	0	Henri Drell	22 – 25 April 2000	2.06 m (6 ft 9 in)	Windy City Bulls	(United States)
SF	2	Sander Raieste	23 – 31 March 1999	2.03 m (6 ft 8 in)	Cazoo Baskonia	(Spain)
PG	7	Sten Sokk	32 – 14 February 1989	1.84 m (6 ft 0 in)	Tallinna Kalev/Audentes	(Estonia)
C	9	Matthias Tass	23 – 23 March 1999	2.08 m (6 ft 10 in)	MKS Dąbrowa Górnicza	(Poland)
F	11	Siim-Sander Vene (C)	31 – 12 November 1990	2.03 m (6 ft 8 in)	Hapoel Bank Yahav Jerusalem	(Israel)
C	15	Maik-Kalev Kotsar	25 – 22 December 1996	2.08 m (6 ft 10 in)	Cazoo Baskonia	(Spain)
C	20	Rauno Nurger (injured)	28 – 24 November 1993	2.08 m (6 ft 10 in)	Acunsa Gipuzkoa	(Spain)
SG	21	Janari Jõesaar (injured)	28 – 8 December 1993	1.98 m (6 ft 6 in)	Anwil Włocławek	(Poland)
SG	22	Martin Dorbek	31 – 21 January 1991	1.94 m (6 ft 4 in)	BC Kalev/Cramo	(Estonia)
PF	33	Kristjan Kitsing	31 – 11 December 1990	2.06 m (6 ft 9 in)	BC Kalev/Cramo	(Estonia)
PG	44	Kerr Kriisa	21 – 2 January 2001	1.88 m (6 ft 2 in)	Arizona Wildcats	(United States)
PG	77	Kristian Kullamäe	23 – 25 May 1999	1.94 m (6 ft 4 in)	7Bet-Lietkabelis	(Lithuania)

Head coach

- (Finland) Jukka Toijala

Assistant coach(es)

- (Estonia) Heiko Rannula
- (Estonia) Indrek Reinbok

Legend

- (C) Team captain
- Club – describes last
  before the tournament
- Age – describes age
  on 1 September 2022

=== Great Britain ===
The squad was announced on 1 September 2022.

Great Britain men's national basketball team – EuroBasket 2022 roster
Players
Coaches

Pos.	No.	Name	Age – Date of birth	Height	Club	Ctr.
SF	00	Ovie Soko	31 – 7 February 1991	2.01 m (6 ft 7 in)	London Lions	(England)
C	0	Gabriel Olaseni	30 – 29 December 1991	2.10 m (6 ft 11 in)	Darüşşafaka	(Turkey)
SG	3	Ben Mockford	33 – 18 August 1989	1.88 m (6 ft 2 in)	Newcastle Eagles	(England)
PG	6	Luke Nelson	27 – 29 June 1995	1.91 m (6 ft 3 in)	London Lions	(England)
PF	10	Daniel Clark (C)	33 – 16 September 1988	2.08 m (6 ft 10 in)	Manchester Giants	(England)
C	13	Kavell Bigby-Williams	26 – 7 October 1995	2.11 m (6 ft 11 in)	Dordogne	(France)
F	22	Myles Hesson	32 – 5 June 1990	1.98 m (6 ft 6 in)	Kagawa Five Arrows	(Japan)
SG	23	Dwayne Lautier-Ogunleye	29 – 23 March 1993	1.91 m (6 ft 3 in)	Swans Gmunden	(Austria)
F	24	Carl Wheatle	24 – 24 March 1998	2.01 m (6 ft 7 in)	Pistoia	(Italy)
G/F	32	Patrick Whelan	26 – 25 August 1996	1.96 m (6 ft 5 in)	Leicester Riders	(England)
F	33	Jamell Anderson	32 – 6 July 1990	2.01 m (6 ft 7 in)	Cheshire Phoenix	(England)
PG	77	Devon van Oostrum	29 – 24 January 1993	1.90 m (6 ft 3 in)	London Lions	(England)

Head coach

- (United Kingdom) Nate Reinking

Assistant coach(es)

- (United Kingdom) Marc Stuetel
- (Greece) Andreas Kapoulas

Legend

- (C) Team captain
- Club – describes last club
  before the tournament
- Age – describes age
  on 1 September 2022

=== Greece ===
The squad was announced on 1 September 2022.

Greece men's national basketball team – EuroBasket 2022 roster
Players
Coaches

Pos.	No.	Name	Age – Date of birth	Height	Club	Ctr.
SG	2	Tyler Dorsey	26 – 18 February 1996	1.95 m (6 ft 5 in)	Dallas Mavericks	(United States)
PG	4	Michalis Lountzis	24 – 4 August 1998	1.96 m (6 ft 5 in)	Olympiacos	(Greece)
SG	5	Giannoulis Larentzakis	28 – 22 September 1993	1.96 m (6 ft 5 in)	Olympiacos	(Greece)
PF	7	Dimitrios Agravanis	27 – 20 December 1994	2.08 m (6 ft 10 in)	Promitheas Patras	(Greece)
PG	8	Nick Calathes	33 – 7 February 1989	1.98 m (6 ft 6 in)	Fenerbahçe	(Turkey)
PG	10	Kostas Sloukas	32 – 15 January 1990	1.92 m (6 ft 4 in)	Olympiacos	(Greece)
C	14	Georgios Papagiannis	25 – 3 July 1997	2.17 m (7 ft 1 in)	Panathinaikos	(Greece)
SF	16	Kostas Papanikolaou (C)	32 – 31 July 1990	2.03 m (6 ft 8 in)	Olympiacos	(Greece)
SF	19	Ioannis Papapetrou	28 – 30 March 1994	2.06 m (6 ft 9 in)	Partizan	(Serbia)
PF	34	Giannis Antetokounmpo	27 – 6 December 1994	2.11 m (6 ft 11 in)	Milwaukee Bucks	(United States)
F/C	37	Kostas Antetokounmpo	24 – 20 November 1997	2.09 m (6 ft 10 in)	ASVEL Basket	(France)
PF	43	Thanasis Antetokounmpo	30 – 18 July 1992	2.01 m (6 ft 7 in)	Milwaukee Bucks	(United States)

Head coach

- (Greece) Dimitrios Itoudis

Assistant coach(es)

- (Greece) Savvas Kamperidis
- (Greece) Sotiris Manolopoulos

Legend

- (C) - Team captain
- Club – describes last club
  before the tournament
- Age – describes age
  on 1 September 2022

=== Italy ===
The squad was announced on 29 August 2022.

Italy men's national basketball team – EuroBasket 2022 roster
Players
Coaches

Pos.	No.	Name	Age – Date of birth	Height	Club	Ctr.
PG	0	Marco Spissu	27 – 5 February 1995	1.84 m (6 ft 0 in)	Reyer Venezia	(Italy)
G	1	Niccolo Mannion	21 – 14 March 2001	1.90 m (6 ft 3 in)	Virtus Bologna	(Italy)
C	6	Paul Biligha	32 – 31 May 1990	2.00 m (6 ft 7 in)	Olimpia Milano	(Italy)
SG	7	Stefano Tonut	28 – 7 November 1993	1.94 m (6 ft 4 in)	Olimpia Milano	(Italy)
F/C	9	Nicolò Melli	31 – 26 January 1991	2.05 m (6 ft 9 in)	Olimpia Milano	(Italy)
SF	13	Simone Fontecchio	26 – 9 December 1995	2.03 m (6 ft 8 in)	Utah Jazz	(United States)
C	16	Amedeo Tessitori	27 – 7 October 1994	2.08 m (6 ft 10 in)	Reyer Venezia	(Italy)
PF	17	Giampaolo Ricci	30 – 27 September 1991	2.01 m (6 ft 7 in)	Olimpia Milano	(Italy)
PG	25	Tommaso Baldasso	24 – 29 January 1998	1.91 m (6 ft 3 in)	Olimpia Milano	(Italy)
PF	33	Achille Polonara	30 – 23 November 1991	2.05 m (6 ft 9 in)	BC Žalgiris	(Lithuania)
G	54	Alessandro Pajola	22 – 9 November 1999	1.94 m (6 ft 4 in)	Virtus Bologna	(Italy)
F	70	Luigi Datome (C)	34 – 27 November 1987	2.02 m (6 ft 8 in)	Olimpia Milano	(Italy)

Head coach

- (Italy) Gianmarco Pozzecco

Assistant coach(es)

- (Italy) Edoardo Casalone
- (Italy) Carlo Recalcati

Legend

- (C) Team captain
- Club – describes last club
  before the tournament
- Age – describes age
  on 1 September 2022

=== Ukraine ===
The squad was announced on 31 August 2022.

Ukraine men's national basketball team roster
Players
Coaches

Pos.	No.	Name	Age – Date of birth	Height	Club	Ctr.
SG	5	Ivan Tkachenko	25 – 23 April 1997	1.97 m (6 ft 6 in)	Prometey	(Ukraine)
PG	7	Denys Lukashov	33 – 30 April 1989	1.87 m (6 ft 2 in)	Prometey	(Ukraine)
SG	10	Sviatoslav Mykhailiuk	25 – 10 June 1997	1.99 m (6 ft 6 in)	Toronto Raptors	(Canada)
SF	13	Vyacheslav Bobrov	29 – 19 September 1992	2.02 m (6 ft 8 in)	Budivelnyk	(Ukraine)
C	23	Artem Pustovyi	30 – 25 June 1992	2.16 m (7 ft 1 in)	Murcia	(Spain)
C	25	Alex Len	29 – 16 June 1993	2.15 m (7 ft 1 in)	Sacramento Kings	(United States)
SG	30	Issuf Sanon	22 – 30 October 1999	1.94 m (6 ft 4 in)	Prometey	(Ukraine)
SG	32	Bogdan Bliznyuk	27 – 31 March 1995	1.98 m (6 ft 6 in)	Budivelnyk	(Ukraine)
C	44	Dmytro Skapintsev	24 – 12 May 1998	2.06 m (6 ft 9 in)	Kyiv-Basket	(Ukraine)
PG	45	Vitaliy Zotov	25 – 3 March 1997	1.88 m (6 ft 2 in)	Rīga	(Latvia)
PF	52	Volodymyr Gerun	28 – 25 March 1994	2.11 m (6 ft 11 in)	Real Betis	(Spain)
PG	55	Illya Sydorov	25 – 4 December 1996	1.82 m (6 ft 0 in)	Prometey	(Ukraine)

Head coach

- (Latvia) Ainars Bagatskis

Assistant coach(es)

- (Ukraine) Maksym Mikhelson
- (Ukraine) Valerii Plekhanov

Legend

- (C) Team captain
- Club – describes last
  club before the competition
- Age – describes age
  on 1 September 2022

== Group D ==
=== Czech Republic ===
The squad was announced on 1 September 2022.

Czech Republic men's national basketball team – EuroBasket 2022 roster
Players
Coaches

Pos.	No.	Name	Age – Date of birth	Height	Club	Ctr.
C	1	Patrik Auda	33 – 29 August 1989	2.06 m (6 ft 9 in)	Yokohama B-Corsairs	(Japan)
F	7	Vojtěch Hruban (C)	33 – 29 August 1989	2.02 m (6 ft 8 in)	London Lions	(United Kingdom)
PG	8	Tomáš Satoranský	30 – 30 October 1991	2.01 m (6 ft 7 in)	FC Barcelona	(Spain)
C	12	Ondřej Balvín	29 – 20 September 1992	2.17 m (7 ft 1 in)	Prometey	(Ukraine)
C	15	Martin Peterka	27 – 12 January 1995	2.03 m (6 ft 8 in)	Braunschweig	(Germany)
F	17	Jaromír Bohačík	30 – 26 May 1992	1.97 m (6 ft 6 in)	Brose Bamberg	(Germany)
PG	19	Ondřej Sehnal	24 – 10 October 1997	1.90 m (6 ft 3 in)	Braunschweig	(Germany)
C	24	Jan Vesely	32 – 24 April 1990	2.13 m (7 ft 0 in)	FC Barcelona	(Spain)
SG	25	David Jelínek	31 – 7 September 1990	1.97 m (6 ft 6 in)	UCAM Murcia	(Spain)
SG	27	Vít Krejčí	22 – 19 June 2000	1.99 m (6 ft 6 in)	Oklahoma City Thunder	(United States)
C	31	Martin Kříž	29 – 17 June 1993	2.00 m (6 ft 7 in)	Nymburk	(Czech Republic)
SG	77	Tomáš Kyzlink	29 – 18 June 1993	1.95 m (6 ft 5 in)	Brose Bamberg	(Germany)

Head coach

- (Israel) Ronen Ginzburg

Assistant coach(es)

- (Czech Republic) Luboš Bartoň
- (Czech Republic) Jan Pospíšil

Legend

- (C) Team captain
- Club – describes last
  club before the competition
- Age – describes age
  on 1 September 2022

=== Finland ===
The squad was announced on 29 August 2022.

Finland men's national basketball team – EuroBasket 2022 roster
Players
Coaches

Pos.	No.	Name	Age – Date of birth	Height	Club	Ctr.
G	1	Miro Little	18 – 30 May 2004	1.93 m (6 ft 4 in)	Sunrise Christian	(United States)
PF	7	Shawn Huff (C)	38 – 5 May 1984	1.98 m (6 ft 6 in)	Seagulls	(Finland)
SG	9	Sasu Salin	31 – 11 June 1991	1.91 m (6 ft 3 in)	Tenerife	(Spain)
G	11	Petteri Koponen	34 – 13 April 1988	1.94 m (6 ft 4 in)	Seagulls	(Finland)
G	14	Henri Kantonen	25 – 20 August 1997	1.98 m (6 ft 6 in)	Kauhajoki	(Finland)
F	18	Mikael Jantunen	22 – 20 April 2000	2.04 m (6 ft 8 in)	Treviso	(Italy)
SF	19	Elias Valtonen	23 – 11 June 1999	2.00 m (6 ft 7 in)	Manresa	(Spain)
C	20	Alexander Madsen	27 – 26 January 1995	2.07 m (6 ft 9 in)	AEK	(Greece)
PG	21	Edon Maxhuni	23 – 21 March 1998	1.88 m (6 ft 2 in)	Den Bosch	(Netherlands)
PF	23	Lauri Markkanen	25 – 22 May 1997	2.13 m (7 ft 0 in)	Utah Jazz	(United States)
G	35	Ilari Seppälä	29 – 27 March 1993	1.88 m (6 ft 2 in)	Saint-Chamond	(France)
SG	41	Topias Palmi	28 – 26 August 1994	1.94 m (6 ft 4 in)	Limburg United	(Belgium)

Head coach

- (Finland) Lassi Tuovi

Assistant coach(es)

- (Finland) Mikko Larkas
- (Finland) Hanno Möttölä

Legend

- (C) Team captain
- Club – describes last club
  before the tournament
- Age – describes age
  on 1 September 2022

=== Israel ===
The squad was announced on 29 August 2022.

Israel men's national basketball team – EuroBasket 2022 roster
Players
Coaches

Pos.	No.	Name	Age – Date of birth	Height	Club	Ctr.
C	4	Roman Sorkin	26 – 11 August 1996	2.08 m (6 ft 10 in)	Maccabi Tel Aviv	(Israel)
PG	7	Gal Mekel (C)	34 – 4 March 1988	1.90 m (6 ft 3 in)	Andorra	(Andorra)
G	8	Deni Avdija	21 – 3 January 2001	2.03 m (6 ft 8 in)	Washington Wizards	(United States)
SF	10	Guy Pnini	38 – 4 September 1983	2.01 m (6 ft 7 in)	Maccabi Tel Aviv	(Israel)
G	11	Yam Madar	21 – 21 December 2000	1.90 m (6 ft 3 in)	Partizan	(Serbia)
SF	12	Rafi Menco	28 – 5 March 1994	1.98 m (6 ft 6 in)	Maccabi Tel Aviv	(Israel)
C	15	Jake Cohen	31 – 25 December 1990	2.06 m (6 ft 9 in)	Maccabi Tel Aviv	(Israel)
C	20	Idan Zalmanson	27 – 18 April 1995	2.06 m (6 ft 9 in)	Hapoel Tel Aviv	(Israel)
SF	30	Nimrod Levi	27 – 24 March 1995	2.06 m (6 ft 9 in)	Hapoel Galil Elyon	(Israel)
PF	41	Tomer Ginat	27 – 7 November 1994	2.03 m (6 ft 8 in)	Hapoel Tel Aviv	(Israel)
PG	45	Tamir Blatt	25 – 4 May 1997	1.90 m (6 ft 3 in)	Alba Berlin	(Germany)
SG	50	Yovel Zoosman	24 – 12 May 1998	1.99 m (6 ft 6 in)	Alba Berlin	(Germany)

Head coach

- (Israel) Guy Goodes

Assistant coach(es)

- (Israel) Dror Cohen
- (Israel) Nadav Zilberstein

Legend

- (C) Team captain
- Club – describes last club
  before the tournament
- Age – describes age
  on 1 September 2022

=== Netherlands ===
The squad was announced on 30 August 2022.

Netherlands men's national basketball team roster
Players
Coaches

Pos.	No.	Name	Age – Date of birth	Height	Club	Ctr.
SG	0	Yannick Franke	26 – 21 May 1996	1.95 m (6 ft 5 in)	PAOK	(Greece)
G	1	Keye van der Vuurst de Vries	20 – 29 December 2001	1.91 m (6 ft 3 in)	Oostende	(Belgium)
PG	5	Leon Williams	31 – 25 July 1991	1.88 m (6 ft 2 in)	Donar	(Netherlands)
G	6	Worthy de Jong (C)	34 – 14 March 1988	1.94 m (6 ft 4 in)	Leiden	(Netherlands)
F	9	Mohamed Kherrazi	32 – 29 June 1990	2.00 m (6 ft 7 in)	Den Bosch	(Netherlands)
SG	11	Shane Hammink	28 – 22 July 1994	2.01 m (6 ft 7 in)	Den Bosch	(Netherlands)
PF	13	Roeland Schaftenaar	34 – 29 July 1988	2.09 m (6 ft 10 in)	Coruña	(Spain)
C	14	Jesse Edwards	22 – 18 March 2000	2.11 m (6 ft 11 in)	Syracuse Orange	(United States)
F	30	Olaf Schaftenaar	29 – 15 May 1993	2.06 m (6 ft 9 in)	Donar	(Netherlands)
C	32	Matt Haarms	25 – 22 April 1997	2.21 m (7 ft 3 in)	Frankfurt	(Germany)
PF	33	Jito Kok	28 – 23 March 1994	2.06 m (6 ft 9 in)	Den Bosch	(Netherlands)
PG	90	Charlon Kloof	32 – 20 March 1990	1.85 m (6 ft 1 in)	FC Porto	(Portugal)

Head coach

- (Italy) Maurizio Buscaglia

Assistant coach(es)

- (United States) Sam Jones
- (United States) Matthew Otten

Legend

- (C) Team captain
- Club – describes last
  club before the competition
- Age – describes age
  on 1 September 2022

=== Poland ===
The squad was announced on 1 September 2022.

Poland men's national basketball team roster
Players
Coaches

Pos.	No.	Name	Age – Date of birth	Height	Club	Ctr.
PF	1	Jarosław Zyskowski	29 – 16 July 1992	2.03 m (6 ft 8 in)	Trefl Sopot	(Poland)
C	2	Aleksander Balcerowski	21 – 19 November 2000	2.15 m (7 ft 1 in)	Gran Canaria	(Spain)
SF	3	Michał Sokołowski	29 – 11 December 1992	1.96 m (6 ft 5 in)	Treviso	(Italy)
PF	5	Aaron Cel	35 – 4 March 1987	2.05 m (6 ft 9 in)	Twarde Pierniki Toruń	(Poland)
PG	6	A. J. Slaughter	34 – 3 August 1987	1.91 m (6 ft 3 in)	Gran Canaria	(Spain)
SF	9	Mateusz Ponitka (C)	28 – 29 August 1993	1.98 m (6 ft 6 in)	Reggio Emilia	(Italy)
PG	10	Łukasz Kolenda	22 – 28 July 1999	1.95 m (6 ft 5 in)	Śląsk	(Poland)
PF	11	Aleksander Dziewa	24 – 6 November 1997	2.07 m (6 ft 9 in)	Śląsk	(Poland)
C	13	Dominik Olejniczak	25 – 1 July 1996	2.08 m (6 ft 10 in)	Gravelines	(France)
SG	23	Michal Michalak	28 – 2 November 1993	1.97 m (6 ft 6 in)	Metropolitans 92	(France)
SG	30	Jakub Garbacz	28 – 17 March 1994	1.97 m (6 ft 6 in)	Stal Ostrów	(Poland)
PG	55	Jakub Schenk	27 – 29 July 1994	1.83 m (6 ft 0 in)	Tours	(France)

Head coach

- (Croatia) Igor Miličić

Assistant coach(es)

- (Poland) Artur Gronek
- (Poland) Grzegorz Kożan

Legend

- (C) Team captain
- Club – describes last
  club before the competition
- Age – describes age
  on 1 September 2022

=== Serbia ===
The squad was announced on 31 August 2022.

Serbia men's national basketball team – EuroBasket 2022 roster
Players
Coaches

Pos.	No.	Name	Age – Date of birth	Height	Club	Ctr.
SF	7	Dejan Davidovac	27 – 17 January 1995	2.03 m (6 ft 8 in)	Crvena zvezda	(Serbia)
SG	9	Vanja Marinković	25 – 9 January 1997	1.97 m (6 ft 6 in)	Baskonia	(Spain)
F	10	Nikola Kalinić	30 – 8 November 1991	2.02 m (6 ft 8 in)	Crvena zvezda	(Serbia)
F	11	Vladimir Lučić (C)	33 – 17 June 1989	2.04 m (6 ft 8 in)	Bayern Munich	(Germany)
C	14	Dušan Ristić	26 – 27 November 1995	2.13 m (7 ft 0 in)	Fuenlabrada	(Spain)
C	15	Nikola Jokić	27 – 19 February 1995	2.11 m (6 ft 11 in)	Denver Nuggets	(United States)
G	16	Nemanja Nedović (injured)	31 – 16 June 1991	1.91 m (6 ft 3 in)	Panathinaikos	(Greece)
PF	21	Marko Jagodić-Kuridža	35 – 15 May 1987	2.05 m (6 ft 9 in)	Budućnost	(Montenegro)
PG	22	Vasilije Micić	28 – 13 January 1994	1.95 m (6 ft 5 in)	Anadolu Efes	(Turkey)
G	23	Marko Gudurić	27 – 8 March 1995	1.97 m (6 ft 6 in)	Fenerbahçe	(Turkey)
PG	25	Ognjen Jaramaz	27 – 1 September 1995	1.92 m (6 ft 4 in)	Bayern Munich	(Germany)
C	33	Nikola Milutinov	27 – 30 December 1994	2.13 m (7 ft 0 in)	CSKA Moscow	(Russia)

Head coach

- (Serbia) Svetislav Pešić

Assistant coach(es)

- (Serbia) Oliver Kostić
- (Serbia) Marko Marinović
- (Serbia) Saša Kosović

Legend

- (C) Team captain
- Club – describes last club
  before the tournament
- Age – describes age
  on 1 September 2022
