= Great Britain men's national basketball team =

Men's national basketball team representing Great Britain

Great Britain
- FIBA ranking: 48 ▼2 (1 September 2026)
- Joined FIBA: 2006
- FIBA zone: FIBA Europe
- National federation: British Basketball
- Coach: Marc Stuetel

Olympic Games
- Appearances: 2
- Medals: None

FIBA World Cup
- Appearances: None

EuroBasket
- Appearances: 6
- Medals: None
Home	Away

First international
- Italy 62–18 Great Britain (Turin, Italy; 15 May 1948)

Biggest win
- Great Britain 92–43 Moldova (Tbilisi, Georgia; 4 August 2014)

Biggest defeat
- Czechoslovakia 111–43 Great Britain (Sofia, Bulgaria; 31 May 1968)

The Great Britain men's national basketball team (also known as GB Basketball or GB) represents Great Britain in international basketball competitions. The national team is administered by British Basketball.

The current governing body for the Great Britain team was formed by the national federations of England (Basketball England), Scotland (Basketballscotland), and Wales (Basketball Wales) on 1 December 2006. Prior to the merger, England, Scotland, and Wales competed independently during international play except for Olympic events.

Great Britain has qualified for the top European tournament, EuroBasket, six times (2009, 2011, 2013, 2017, 2022, 2025). Although before or since the alliance, no British team in history has ever qualified for the FIBA World Cup. However, Great Britain has competed at the Olympic Games twice (1948, 2012), in which they hosted.

== History ==
=== 1948 London Olympics ===
The Great Britain national team debuted as the host for the 1948 London Olympics. The team was placed into Group A to begin the tournament. Although with the advantage of being at home on their side, the team did not capitalise. Great Britain were thoroughly outplayed in their first fixture against Uruguay, and eventually finished last in group play at (0–5). The outcome relegated the national team to the classification round. There they recorded their first tournament victory against Ireland, but fell in their next two matches, to wrap up the event at (1–7) overall.

=== 1960–1992 Olympic Qualifying ===
After hosting the 1948 Olympic Games, Great Britain were not represented at the Olympic tournament in 1952 or 1956, due to FIBA and the IOC not having a qualifying event. Although spanning from 1960 to 1992, Great Britain failed to qualify for the competition.

=== British Basketball formed 2006 ===
After London won the right to host the 2012 Summer Olympics, the organisers wanted competitive teams in every sport, including basketball. A Great Britain side was formed for the first time since 1992, on 1 December 2006. The national team secured the help of the NBA's Chicago Bulls' star Luol Deng, as he led Great Britain to promotion from EuroBasket Division B to Division A. FIBA stated that Great Britain had to improve their competitiveness prior to being granted the spot in the Olympic tournament that would normally be reserved for the host nation.

=== EuroBasket 2009 ===
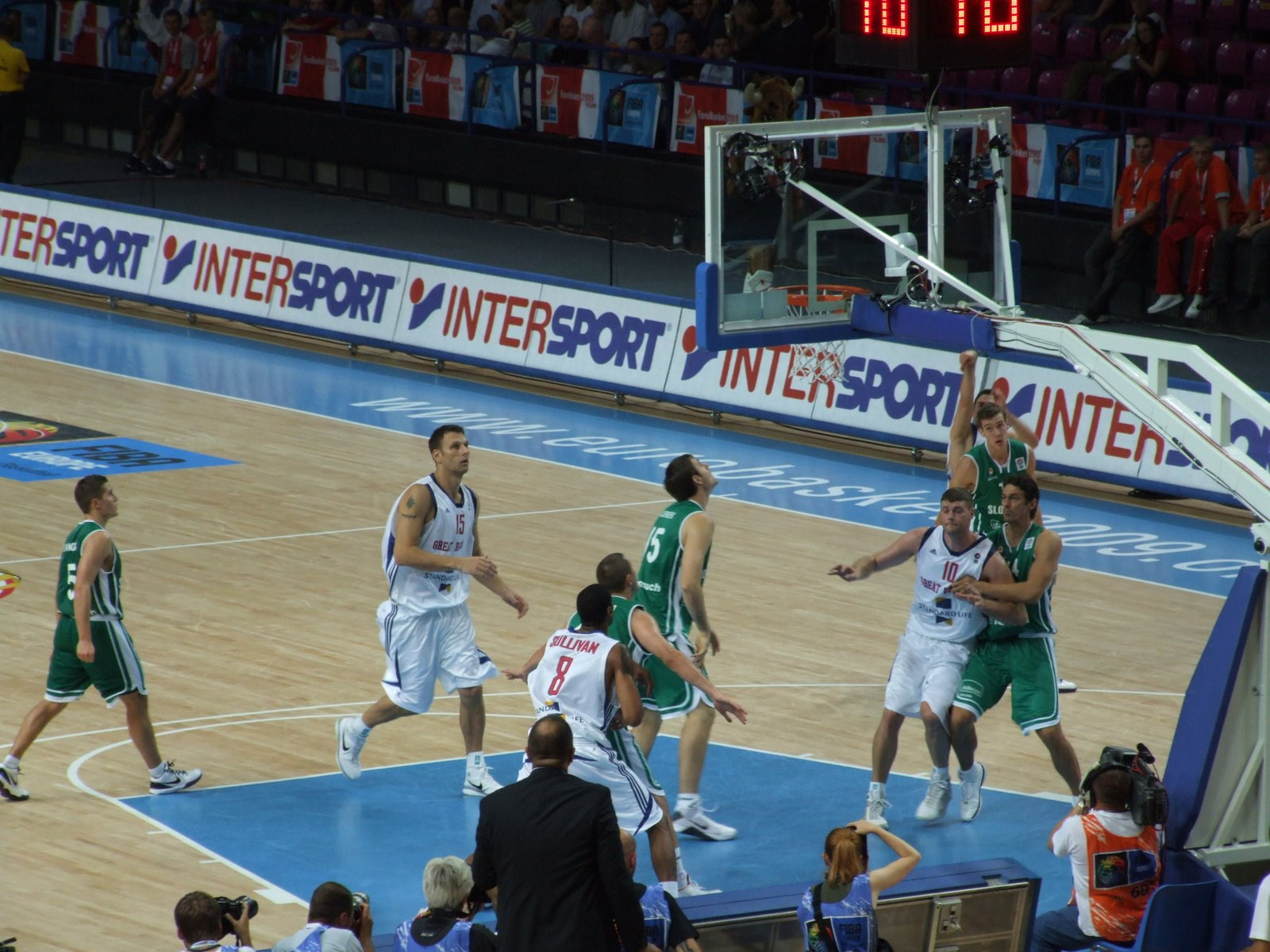
Great Britain against Slovenia at the EuroBasket 2009

In Great Britain's first cycle at the Division A level in 2008, they went through qualification for the EuroBasket 2009. The team would eventually finish on top of Group D, which also included Bosnia and Herzegovina, Czech Republic and Israel to qualify for the finals.

At the first Euro finals for Great Britain after the formation of British Basketball, the national team were drawn into a tough Group C, which featured European heavyweights Spain, and Serbia along with a feisty Slovenia squad. However, the team was overmatched by the international experience those national sides possessed, and ultimately finished at the bottom of the group at (0–3) to be eliminated.

=== EuroBasket 2011 ===
During August 2010, Great Britain began their qualification campaign for EuroBasket 2011. The team was drawn into Group B, containing Bosnia and Herzegovina, Hungary, Macedonia, and Ukraine. Great Britain went on to finish at the top of the group, and qualified for their second appearance at the finals overall. Heading into their second Euro finals appearance, the British were determined to display a better performance than in 2009. Being drawn into the tournament's Group A, the mindset was different this time around. Many of the players from the previous finals appearance had more experience, which the team used as optimism entering 2011. In the opening match for Great Britain, they were pitted against the host Lithuania. However, Luol Deng, and his game high 25 points for the British was not enough to pull the upset as the team fell to (0–1).

Following Great Britain's tough opening match loss to the Lithuanians, the British were handed two heavy defeats in their next two fixtures against Turkey, and Spain. However, heading into their fourth match of group play Team GB would earn their first ever victory at the Euro finals, as they defeated Portugal 85–73. 24 hours after their first win, the team turned around and were victorious again; this time over Poland 88–81. Unfortunately, at a record of (2–3) in group play it would not be enough for Great Britain to advance.

=== 2012 London Olympics ===
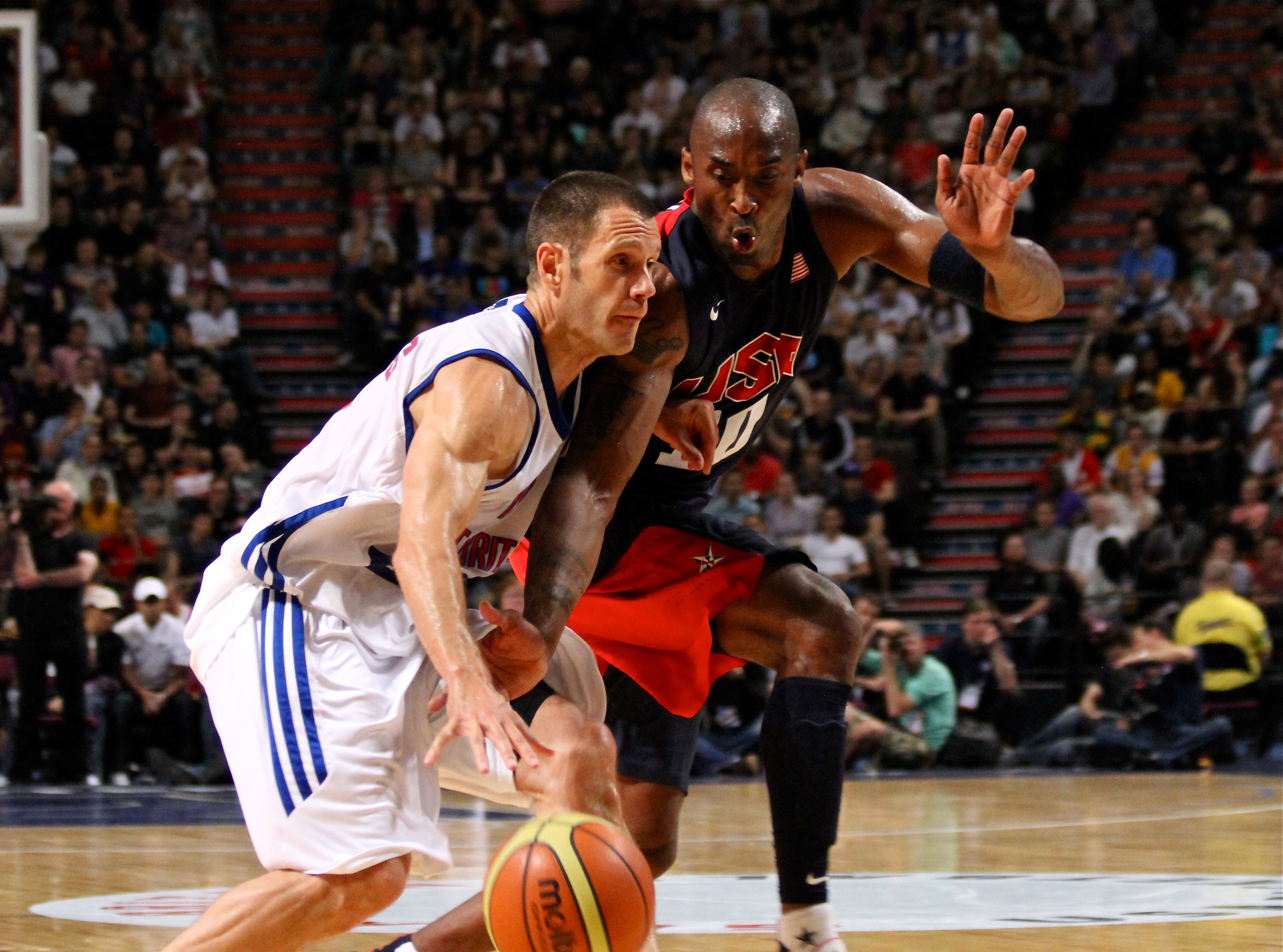
Nate Reinking defended by Kobe Bryant, in a friendly match before the 2012 Games

On 13 March 2011, FIBA voted 17–3 in favour of Great Britain receiving their host nation spot at the 2012 London Olympics with one condition, they had until 30 June 2012 to decide on whether to merge the three nations that make up the team or disband after the 2016 Olympics in Rio de Janeiro.

On 21 June 2012, Basketball Wales confirmed their intent to reject the proposed merger on the grounds that the arrangement was always intended to be temporary in the build-up to the London Olympics, and that it would not be in the best interests for the sport in Wales for the country to forfeit its national team, when the GB team contained no Welsh players.

For the 2012 Olympic Games, Great Britain was awarded automatic qualification. Entering the group stage, Great Britain struggled in their first two matches against Russia and Brazil, which resulted in loses. In Great Britain's third match of the tournament, they were up against a strong Spain side. However, after a monumental effort from the British, which nearly saw the team pull off a historic upset; they would ultimately succumb to the eventual tournament runners-up 79–78. After the draining loss, Great Britain were completely overwhelmed in their fourth fixture of the tournament; in a disastrous defeat to Australia 75–106. In their final group play game, Great Britain faced China, with both teams already unable to progress to the knockout stage. Team GB would win the game 90–58, making it only the second Olympic victory all-time for Great Britain. Throughout the tournament British star Luol Deng played 173 minutes, more than any other player and also came in the top ten for points and assists.

=== EuroBasket 2013 ===
In June 2013, Brooklyn Nets assistant coach Joe Prunty was announced as the new head coach of the national team, following the resignation of Chris Finch.

Having participated in the previous Olympic tournament, Great Britain qualified automatically for EuroBasket 2013 in Slovenia. They went into the finals short-handed: Luol Deng was recovering from illness, Pops Mensah-Bonsu did not participate due to an injury and Joel Freeland was also absent, citing commitments with his club. Despite this, Great Britain won their first match against Israel in overtime, but subsequently lost to France and Belgium. Winning their fourth group game against favoured Germany put them on the verge of advancing to the second round of the tournament for the first time in their history. The team went into their final group game against Ukraine needing to win, but Ukraine had been performing better than expected and dispatched Britain 87–68. The team finished equaling their record from the previous tournament, with Daniel Clark leading Great Britain in scoring and defence.

Following their tournament exit, it was announced that the governing body for British sports, UK Sport, were to cut the funding for the team after failing to reach the agreed-upon minimum final placing in the tournament. Funding from UK Sport would have been used to aid the team's efforts to qualify for the 2016 Summer Olympics in Rio de Janeiro.

=== EuroBasket 2015 qualification ===
For qualification to the 2015 Euro finals, a defeat to Iceland on 20 August meant that the team had failed to qualify for the tournament. This outcome was largely attributed to British Basketball no longer receiving funding from UK Sport; efficiencies had to be made, including cancelling training camps. Further, the team was unable to secure the participation of players such as Luol Deng due to insurance costs, which in turn affected performance, and put the future of the Great Britain team in doubt. Forward Kieron Achara spoke out about how the financial struggles had affected the team.

=== EuroBasket 2017 ===
After missing the Euro finals in 2015, Great Britain were eager to qualify for EuroBasket 2017. During the qualifiers, the team was placed into Group G, where they needed to finish in the top two in their group to reach qualification. The team eventually succeeded in the process, only finishing behind Hungary, to reach the tournament for the fourth time.

At the finals, Great Britain were drawn in the "group of death" with Belgium, Latvia, Russia, Serbia, and one of the tournament hosts, Turkey. Despite some close performances, GB lost all five of their matches to finish at the bottom of Group D.

After the tournament Tony Garbelotto took over as head coach of the national team from Joe Prunty.

=== 2019 FIBA World Cup qualification ===
For the process to reach the 2019 FIBA World Cup, Great Britain was placed into Group H during the first round of World Cup qualifiers. However, in their first match at home against Greece, the team would fall in a crushing hard fought affair in overtime 92–95. In their next qualifying fixture, the team would drop another one, on the road this time at Estonia. After the loss, Tony Garbelotto resigned as head coach of Great Britain, and was replaced by Alberto Lorenzo, prior to their next match which they lost at Israel; during the February qualifying window. With an (0–3) record, the team prepared for Greece once again, this time on the road. Although the outcome was similar, another loss for Great Britain, and putting the team in serious danger of being eliminated.

Heading into the final window of the first round of qualifiers, the team notched their first victory during World Cup qualifying at home against Estonia. With a little momentum on their side, all the team needed to do was defeat Israel in the final match of group play. Ultimately, the team would come up short, losing in a close match at home 59–67, erasing any chance for Great Britain to advance.

=== 2020s–present ===
After Great Britain successfully made it through pre-qualifying for the EuroBasket 2022, at an overall record of (7–1), the team advanced to the final round of qualifiers. Following a defeat in their opening fixture away to Montenegro 81–74, Great Britain earned a tough victory at home against Germany 81–73. The team went on to win three of their next four matches during the qualifying period, including a second win over Germany, which came at the buzzer to clinch a place into the finals. Drawn into Group C at the tournament, however, Great Britain would go winless for the second consecutive EuroBasket to finish in last place.

The underwhelming play for Great Britain would carry over to their World Cup qualifying campaign for the 2023 FIBA World Cup. They would compile a (1–9) record during the process and failed to qualify. Following the disappointment of missing out on the World Cup, Great Britain entered EuroBasket 2025 qualifying, where they went on to secure qualification with a record of (4–2), to make their fourth successive appearance on the European stage. However, at the finals placed in Group B, disastrous performances in four out of their five group stage fixtures eliminated any possibility to advance. Their only victory came in their last Group B match against Montenegro 83–89, which was Great Britain's first win at the event since 2013.

In October 2025, a month after the tournament concluded, scandal hit British basketball, as the federation, along with the men's national team was suspended by FIBA from international competition due to "governance issues". After a month of deliberation, meeting with stakeholders in the UK, FIBA eventually lifted their ban against the national team in November 2025.

== Competitive record ==
=== FIBA World Cup ===
World Cup					Qualification		
Year	Position	Pld	W	L	Pld	W	L
1950 to 2006	Not a FIBA member						
(Turkey) 2010	Did not qualify				EuroBasket served as qualifiers		
(Spain) 2014	Did not qualify				EuroBasket served as qualifiers		
(China) 2019	Did not qualify				6	1	5
(Philippines) (Japan) (Indonesia) 2023	Did not qualify				10	1	9
(Qatar) 2027	Did not qualify				6	1	5
(France) 2031	To be determined				To be determined		
Total	0/5				22	3	19

=== Olympic Games ===
Olympic Games					Qualifying		
Year	Position	Pld	W	L	Pld	W	L
(United Kingdom) 1948	20th	8	1	7	Entered as host		
(Italy) 1960	Did not qualify				5	1	4
(Japan) 1964	Did not qualify				8	2	6
(Mexico) 1968	Did not qualify				6	0	6
(West Germany) 1972	Did not qualify				3	0	3
(Canada) 1976	Did not qualify				6	0	6
(Soviet Union) 1980	Did not qualify				4	1	3
(United States) 1984	Did not qualify				9	3	6
(South Korea) 1988	Did not qualify				7	2	5
(Spain) 1992	Did not qualify				4	1	3
(China) 2008	Did not qualify				Did not qualify		
(United Kingdom) 2012	9th	5	1	4	Qualified as host		
(Brazil) 2016	Did not qualify				Did not qualify		
(Japan) 2020	Did not qualify				Did not qualify		
(France) 2024	Did not enter				Did not enter		
(United States) 2028	To be determined				To be determined		
Total	2/15	13	2	11	52	10	42

=== EuroBasket ===
EuroBasket					Qualification		
Year	Position	Pld	W	L	Pld	W	L
1935 to 2005	Not a FIBA Europe member						
(Spain) 2007	Division B				10	8	2
(Poland) 2009	13th	3	0	3	6	4	2
(Lithuania) 2011	13th	5	2	3	8	6	2
(Slovenia) 2013	13th	5	2	3	Directly qualified		
(France) (Croatia) (Germany) (Latvia) 2015	Did not qualify				4	0	4
(Finland) (Israel) (Romania) (Turkey) 2017	22nd	5	0	5	6	3	3
(Czech Republic) (Georgia (country)) (Italy) (Germany) 2022	24th	5	0	5	14	11	3
(Cyprus) (Finland) (Poland) (Latvia) 2025	21st	5	1	4	6	4	2
(Estonia) (Greece) (Slovenia) (Spain) 2029	To be determined				In progress		
Total	6/8	28	5	23	54	36	18

== Results and fixtures ==
Win Loss

=== 2025 ===
27 November 2025 2027 FIBA World Cup qualifiers – 1st round	Great Britain	88–89	Lithuania	London, England
19:30 (UTC+0)	Scoring by quarter: 21–16, 30–22, 16–30, 21–21
	Pts: Hesson, Wheatle 18; Rebs: Hesson 8 Asts: Hesson 5	Boxscore	Pts: Sargiūnas 27; Rebs: Velička 10; Asts: three players 4	Arena: Copper Box Arena; Attendance: 2,809; Referees: Gatis Saliņš (LAT), Marius Ciulin (ROU), Elvis Binders-Čoders (LAT)

30 November 2025 2027 FIBA World Cup qualifiers – 1st round	Iceland	84–90	Great Britain	Reykjavík, Iceland
16:45 (UTC+0)	Scoring by quarter: 17–17, 18–26, 16–26, 33–21
	Pts: Hermannsson 18; Rebs: Pálsson 10; Asts: Friðriksson 8	Boxscore	Pts: Wheatle 22; Rebs: Yeboah 7 Asts: Ellis 8	Arena: Laugardalshöll; Attendance: 1,800; Referees: Mihkel Männiste (EST), Edgard Ceccarelli (FRA), Ioannis Agrafiotis (GRE)

=== 2026 ===
27 February 2026 2027 FIBA World Cup qualifiers – 1st round	Great Britain	57–93	Italy	Newcastle, England
19:30 (UTC+0)	Scoring by quarter: 14–32, 13–19, 19–14, 11–28
	Pts: Wheatle 10; Rebs: Hesson 6 Asts: Wheatle 8	Boxscore	Pts: Mannion 19; Rebs: Akele 9 Asts: Spissu 6	Arena: Vertu Motors Arena; Attendance: 2,407; Referees: Martin Vulić (CRO), Fernando Calatrava (ESP), Ivor Matějek (CZE)

2 March 2026 2027 FIBA World Cup qualifiers – 1st round	Italy	84–75	Great Britain	Livorno, Italy
19:30 (UTC+1)	Scoring by quarter: 21–21, 22–17, 21–21, 20–16
	Pts: Niang 23; Rebs: Niang 7 Asts: Spissu 7	Boxscore	Pts: Ellis 19; Rebs: Hesson 10; Asts: Ellis	Arena: PalaLivorno; Attendance: 7,900; Referees: Boris Krejić (SVN), Yener Yılmaz (TUR), Siniša Paša (SRB)

2 July 2026 2027 FIBA World Cup qualifiers – 1st round	Lithuania	105–85	Great Britain	Klaipėda, Lithuania
18:30 (UTC+3)	Scoring by quarter: 36–28, 23–13, 21–24, 25–20
	Pts: Tubelis 21; Rebs: Valančiūnas 11; Asts: Jakučionis 8	Boxscore	Pts: Hesson 22; Rebs: Olaseni 6 Asts: Nelson, Wheatle 6	Arena: Švyturys Arena; Attendance: 5,288; Referees: Georgios Poursanidis (GRE), Zdenko Tomašovič (SVK), Blaž Zupančič (SVN)

5 July 2026 2027 FIBA World Cup qualifiers – 1st round	Great Britain	86–88	Iceland	Manchester, England
15:00 (UTC+1)	Scoring by quarter: 24–19, 25–22, 20–21, 17–26
	Pts: Uduje 23; Rebs: Wheatle 11; Asts: Uduje 6	Boxscore	Pts: Guðmundsson 25; Rebs: Guðmundsson, Hlinason 8 Asts: Friðriksson 10	Arena: National Basketball Performance Centre; Attendance: 2,045; Referees: Marius Ciulin (ROU), Siniša Prpa (SRB), Ariadna Chueca (ESP)

27 August 2026 EuroBasket 2029 pre-qualifiers – 2nd round	Switzerland	75–110	Great Britain	Fribourg, Switzerland
19:00 (UTC+2)	Scoring by quarter: 19–25, 19–25, 13–29, 24–31
	Pts: Schumacher 20; Rebs: N. Ročak 7 Asts: Schumacher 3	Boxscore	Pts: Uduje 24; Rebs: three players 7 Asts: Watson-Gayle 8	Arena: Halle Omnisport Saint-Léonard; Attendance: 1,020; Referees: Ivor Matějek (CZE), Łukasz Jankowski (POL), Rainis Värv (EST)

30 August 2026 EuroBasket 2029 pre-qualifiers – 2nd round	Great Britain	97–72	Slovakia	Newcastle, England
17:00 (UTC+1)	Scoring by quarter: 29–22, 19–16, 24–17, 25–17
	Pts: Uduje 14; Rebs: Williams 9 Asts: Williams 6	Boxscore	Pts: Brodziansky 24; Rebs: Brodziansky 14; Asts: Kováčik 4	Arena: Vertu Motors Arena; Attendance: 2,381; Referees: Marius Ciulin (ROU), Valerio Grigioni (ITA), Nermin Hodžić (GER)

29 November 2026 EuroBasket 2029 pre-qualifiers – 2nd round	Great Britain	vs.	Switzerland	Newcastle, England
15:00 (UTC+0)
		Boxscore		Arena: Vertu Motors Arena

=== 2027 ===
25 February 2027 EuroBasket 2029 pre-qualifiers – 2nd round	Slovakia	vs.	Great Britain	Slovakia
--:-- (UTC+1)
		Boxscore

== Team ==
=== Current roster ===
Roster for the EuroBasket 2029 Pre-Qualifiers matches on 27 and 30 August 2026 against Switzerland and Slovakia.

Great Britain men's national basketball team roster
Players
Coaches

Pos.	No.	Name	Age – Date of birth	Height	Club	Ctr.
PG	1	Quinn Ellis	23 – 1 April 2003	1.95 m (6 ft 5 in)	St. John's Red Storm	(United States)
C	2	Amari Williams	24 – 28 January 2002	2.11 m (6 ft 11 in)	Boston Celtics	(United States)
PG	3	Jelani Watson-Gayle	27 – 9 September 1998	1.80 m (5 ft 11 in)	Unattached
G	4	Josh Uduje	24 – 27 April 2002	1.91 m (6 ft 3 in)	Boulazac	(France)
SG	5	Amin Adamu	28 – 3 October 1997	1.96 m (6 ft 5 in)	Kortrijk Spurs	(Belgium)
G	6	Luke Nelson	31 – 29 June 1995	1.91 m (6 ft 3 in)	Manchester	(England)
SF	7	Joshua O'Garro	24 – 18 September 2001	1.96 m (6 ft 5 in)	London Lions	(England)
C	13	Jubrile Belo	28 – 27 June 1998	2.06 m (6 ft 9 in)	Saint-Étienne	(France)
F	20	Tosan Evbuomwan	25 – 16 February 2001	2.01 m (6 ft 7 in)	Barcelona	(Spain)
F	22	Myles Hesson	36 – 5 June 1990	1.98 m (6 ft 6 in)	Unattached
F/C	23	Dan Akin	28 – 16 June 1998	2.06 m (6 ft 9 in)	CSM Oradea	(Romania)
F	24	Carl Wheatle (C)	28 – 24 March 1998	2.01 m (6 ft 7 in)	Maxima Roma	(Italy)
PF	40	Sean Trumper	25 – 8 November 2000	2.01 m (6 ft 7 in)	FOG Næstved	(Denmark)
SG	77	Flynn Boardman-Raffett	24 – 26 February 2002	1.96 m (6 ft 5 in)	Nevėžis	(Lithuania)

Head coach

- (United Kingdom) Marc Stuetel

Assistant coach(es)

- (Spain) Alberto Lorenzo
- (United Kingdom) Jackson Gibbons
- (United Kingdom) Adam Sewell

Legend

- (C) Team captain
- Club – describes last
  club before the competition
- Age – describes age
  on 27 August 2026

=== Depth chart ===
Pos.	Starting 5	Bench 1	Bench 2
C	Amari Williams	Jubrile Belo	Dan Akin
PF	Tosan Evbuomwan	Myles Hesson	Sean Trumper
SF	Carl Wheatle	Joshua O'Garro
SG	Josh Uduje	Flynn Boardman-Raffett	Amin Adamu
PG	Quinn Ellis	Luke Nelson	Jelani Watson-Gayle

== Head coach position ==
- (United Kingdom) Malcolm Finlay – (1947–1948)
- (United Kingdom) George Wilkinson – (1959–1960)
- (United Kingdom) Anthony Smith – (1963–1964)
- (United Kingdom) Ken Johnston – (1967–1972)
- (United States) Miles Aiken – (1975–1976)
- (United States) Norman Sloan – (1979–1980)
- (United States) Thomas Schneeman – (1983–1984)
- (United States) Joseph Whelton – (1987–1988)
- (United States) Kevin Cadle – (1991–1992)
- (United States) Chris Finch – (2006–2013)
- (United States) Joe Prunty – (2013–2017)
- (United Kingdom) Tony Garbelotto – (2017–2018)
- (Spain) Alberto Lorenzo – (2018–2019)
- (United Kingdom) Nate Reinking – (2019–2023)
- (United Kingdom) Marc Stuetel – (2023–present)

== Past rosters ==
1948 Olympic Games: finished 20th among 23 teams

3 Lionel Price, 4 Robert Norris, 5 Stanley Weston, 6 Trevor Davies, 7 Malcolm Finlay (C), 8 Colin Hunt, 9 Frank Cole, 10 Douglas Legg,
11 Ronald Legg, 12 Harry Weston, 13 Alex Eke, 14 Stanley McMeekan, 15 Sydney McMeekan (Coach: Malcolm Finlay)

2009 EuroBasket: finished 13th among 16 teams

4 Jarrett Hart, 5 Kieron Achara, 6 Mike Lenzly, 7 Pops Mensah-Bonsu, 8 Andrew Sullivan (C), 9 Nick George, 10 Robert Archibald,
11 Joel Freeland, 12 Nate Reinking, 13 Daniel Clark, 14 Flinder Boyd, 15 Andrew Betts (Coach: Chris Finch)

2011 EuroBasket: finished 13th among 24 teams

4 Ogo Adegboye, 5 Andrew Lawrence, 6 Mike Lenzly, 7 Devon van Oostrum, 8 Andrew Sullivan (C), 9 Luol Deng, 10 Robert Archibald,
11 Joel Freeland, 12 Nate Reinking, 13 Daniel Clark, 14 Eric Boateng, 15 Kyle Johnson (Coach: Chris Finch)

2012 Olympic Games: finished 9th among 12 teams

4 Kieron Achara, 5 Andrew Lawrence, 6 Mike Lenzly, 7 Pops Mensah-Bonsu, 8 Andrew Sullivan (C), 9 Luol Deng (C),
10 Robert Archibald, 11 Joel Freeland, 12 Nate Reinking, 13 Daniel Clark, 14 Kyle Johnson, 15 Eric Boateng (Coach: Chris Finch)

2013 EuroBasket: finished 13th among 24 teams

4 Kieron Achara, 5 Andrew Lawrence, 6 Justin Robinson, 7 Devon van Oostrum, 8 Andrew Sullivan (C), 9 Gareth Murray,
10 Myles Hesson, 11 Alasdair Fraser, 12 Daniel Clark, 13 Ogo Adegboye, 14 Eric Boateng, 15 Kyle Johnson (Coach: Joe Prunty)

2017 EuroBasket: finished 22nd among 24 teams

0 Jules Dang-Akodo, 1 Kyle Johnson, 3 Ben Mockford, 4 Andrew Lawrence, 5 Teddy Okereafor, 10 Daniel Clark, 11 Gareth Murray,
13 Eric Boateng, 19 Luke Nelson, 20 Kieron Achara (C), 26 Gabriel Olaseni, 44 Kofi Josephs (Coach: Joe Prunty)

2022 EuroBasket: finished 24th among 24 teams

00 Ovie Soko, 0 Gabriel Olaseni, 3 Ben Mockford, 6 Luke Nelson, 10 Daniel Clark (C), 13 Kavell Bigby-Williams, 22 Myles Hesson,
23 Dwayne Lautier-Ogunleye, 24 Carl Wheatle, 32 Patrick Whelan, 33 Jamell Anderson, 77 Devon van Oostrum (Coach: Nate Reinking)

2025 EuroBasket: finished 21st among 24 teams

0 Gabriel Olaseni, 2 Joshua Ward-Hibbert, 5 Amin Adamu, 6 Luke Nelson, 7 Jelani Watson-Gayle, 12 Tarik Phillip, 13 Jubrile Belo,
15 Akwasi Yeboah, 22 Myles Hesson, 24 Carl Wheatle (C), 30 Dan Akin, 32 Patrick Whelan (Coach: Marc Stuetel)

== See also ==
- Sport in Great Britain
- Great Britain women's national basketball team
- Great Britain men's national under-20 basketball team
- Great Britain men's national under-18 basketball team
- Great Britain men's national under-16 basketball team
- Super League Basketball
