= Joe Prunty =

American basketball coach (born 1969)

Orlando Magic
- Position: Assistant coach
- League: NBA

Personal information
- Born: February 12, 1969 (age 57) Sunnyvale, California, U.S.

Career information
- High school: Fremont (Sunnyvale, California)
- College: Cal Poly San Luis Obispo
- Coaching career: 1996–present

Career history

Coaching
- 1996–2005: San Antonio Spurs (assistant)
- 2005–2008: Dallas Mavericks (assistant)
- 2008–2010: Portland Trail Blazers (assistant)
- 2010–2013: Cleveland Cavaliers (assistant)
- 2013–2014: Brooklyn Nets (assistant)
- 2014–2018: Milwaukee Bucks (assistant)
- 2018: Milwaukee Bucks (interim)
- 2018–2019: Phoenix Suns (assistant)
- 2021–2023: Atlanta Hawks (assistant)
- 2023: Atlanta Hawks (interim)
- 2023–2025: Milwaukee Bucks (assistant)
- 2024: Milwaukee Bucks (interim)
- 2025–present: Orlando Magic (assistant coach)

Career highlights
- As assistant coach: 3× NBA champion (1999, 2003, 2005); NBA Cup champion (2024)

Joe Prunty (born February 12, 1969) is an American professional basketball coach who is an assistant coach for the Orlando Magic of the National Basketball Association (NBA). Previously, he served as an assistant coach and interim head coach for the Milwaukee Bucks and Atlanta Hawks. He was also the head coach of the Great Britain national team from June 2013 until September 2017.

== Early career ==
Prunty was born in Sunnyvale, California, and graduated from Fremont High School. He played college basketball at De Anza College in Cupertino, California before going on to earn a bachelor's degree in Speech Communications from Cal Poly, San Luis Obispo. He began his coaching career in 1992 in San Diego, California, coaching at University of San Diego High School and St. Augustine High School. During his time as a high school coach, former Sacramento Kings head coach Luke Walton, former Chicago Cubs pitcher Mark Prior, and former Chicago White Sox outfielder Carlos Quentin were among his players. Before being a professional basketball coach, he previously worked as a beer salesman for Anheuser-Busch products in San Diego.

== NBA coaching career ==
While coaching at the high school level, former University of San Diego head coach Hank Egan informed Prunty of a possible opening in the San Antonio Spurs organization. Based on this tip, Prunty joined the coaching staff of the Spurs as an assistant video coordinator. He left briefly in April 1997 to become an assistant coach at the University of San Diego but returned to the Spurs for the 1997–1998 season, eventually being promoted to assistant coach in 2000. During his time with the Spurs, the team won championships in 1999, 2003, and 2005.

In 2006, he left San Antonio to become a Dallas Mavericks assistant coach, becoming a part of the staff of former Spurs player Avery Johnson. The team made it to the 2006 NBA Finals, losing to the Miami Heat in six games. The team ended the 2006–07 season with the best record in the league, led by MVP Dirk Nowitzki, but were upset in the first round of the playoffs by Don Nelson's Golden State Warriors. Prunty left the Mavericks for the Portland Trail Blazers in 2008 when Avery Johnson was fired and replaced with Rick Carlisle.

While Prunty was a member of the Trail Blazers' coaching staff, the team had back-to-back 50 win seasons for the first time since the 1999–2000 and 2000–01 NBA seasons. He also served as the Blazers' head coach during the NBA Summer League in 2008 and 2009. He joined the Cleveland Cavaliers as an assistant coach in 2010, spending three seasons as a member of Byron Scott's team. On August 20, 2013, he was hired as an assistant coach by the Brooklyn Nets. Nets' head coach Jason Kidd was suspended for the first two games of the season after pleading guilty to a misdemeanor DWI charge stemming from an incident in July 2012. Kidd named Prunty to serve as acting head coach for the team's season opener against Cleveland Cavaliers and their home opener against Miami Heat. The team went 1–1 in these games with a loss against Cleveland and a win against Miami.

Kidd left the Nets for the Milwaukee Bucks in 2014 and Prunty joined the staff there. On December 23, 2015, Prunty was named the interim head coach for 17 games as Kidd underwent hip surgery. The team went 8–9 during that time, a significant improvement after beginning the season 10–18. With Prunty at the helm, the team played at a faster pace with a greater emphasis on offensive rebounds, which resulted in a much improved offensive rating. The Bucks reached the playoffs during the 2016–17 season, losing to the Toronto Raptors in six games. After beginning the 2017–18 season with a disappointing 23–22 record and falling to the eighth seed in the Eastern Conference, head coach Kidd was fired, and Prunty was named interim head coach on January 22, 2018, before they began their game against the Phoenix Suns. After winning that game, for the rest of the season onward, the Bucks would improve just enough to gain the 7th seed of the Eastern Conference in the 2018 NBA Playoffs, facing against the Boston Celtics in the first round. While Milwaukee would be competitive throughout the series, they would ultimately lose the first round 4–3. Prunty would remain with the Bucks until May 17, when Mike Budenholzer would be named his replacement. On June 27, 2018, Prunty was hired by the Phoenix Suns as an assistant coach. He along with other Suns assistants were relieved of their duties in April 2019, following the firing of head coach Igor Kokoškov. He did not coach in the NBA for the next two seasons, but served as the head coach for the United States men's national basketball team during the third window of qualification for the 2022 FIBA AmeriCup in February 2021. On June 23, 2021, Suns coach Monty Williams credited Prunty as being a partial inspiration for a Western Conference Finals game-winning inbounds alley-oop play set up between Jae Crowder and Deandre Ayton.

On July 23, 2021, the Atlanta Hawks announced that Prunty would be joining Nate McMillan's staff as an assistant coach. With McMillan and lead assistant Chris Jent entering health and safety protocols, Prunty served as acting head coach for three games of a west coast road trip in January 2022. The team went 1–2 during that time, securing a 108–102 win against the Sacramento Kings on January 5. With the departure of Jent during the offseason, Prunty was named the team's lead assistant in the summer of 2022. For the Hawks' 123–122 dramatic overtime victory against the Chicago Bulls on December 11, 2022, Prunty drew up the play that led to AJ Griffin sinking a game winning layup with 0.5 seconds left on the clock. He was named interim head coach on February 21, 2023, after McMillan's firing. The team went 2–0 during his tenure as interim head coach with victories against the Cleveland Cavaliers and Brooklyn Nets. On February 26, Prunty's tenure as interim head coach came to an end when Quin Snyder was named head coach of the Hawks.

On June 28, 2023, it was revealed that Prunty would rejoin the Milwaukee Bucks as an assistant coach, joining Adrian Griffin's staff. On January 23, 2024, Prunty was named the interim head coach of the Milwaukee Bucks, following the firing of Griffin. Prunty served as interim coach for three games, until the Bucks hired Doc Rivers as head coach.

On July 5, 2025 it was reported that Prunty was leaving the Bucks for the Orlando Magic, becoming an assistant coach on Jamahl Mosley's staff.

== National team career ==
Prunty was named the head coach of the Great Britain men's national team in June 2013 after an extensive interview process following Chris Finch's resignation. The choice was initially somewhat controversial as Prunty had little previous international coaching experience. Prunty's first campaign as GB head coach was summer 2013. Despite being without top players Luol Deng, Ben Gordon, Joel Freeland, and Pops Mensah-Bonsu, Prunty began his tenure with a 61–55 win over Puerto Rico in an International Test Match at The Copper Box Arena, London. The team went on to upset Israel in their first game of Eurobasket 2013, earning a dramatic overtime victory. However, Great Britain ended the group phase with a 2–3 record, not good enough to advance. Because of this result, UK Sport cut its funding for the team.

Despite the future of the British national team looking bleak due to the budget constraints, Prunty stayed on as coach as the team attempted to qualify for Eurobasket 2015. The cut in funding meant the team could not afford the insurance costs required to recruit top players, had to cancel training camp, and required players to sleep in dorm beds and live on £15 a day. After losses to Bosnia and Iceland, the team failed to qualify for the tournament.

With funding from Sport England, the team set out in 2016 to qualify for Eurobasket 2017. Their 3–3 record in their group was good enough to ensure that they were one of the four top runners-up in all of the qualifying groups. For the 2017 tournament, they ended up in the very tough Group D, facing off against Belgium, Latvia, Russia, Serbia, and hosts Turkey. Despite keeping most of the games close, the team went 0–5 at the tournament and were not able to advance to the knockout phase.

Due to changes from FIBA in the qualifying process for the upcoming World Cup and Olympics that conflict with the NBA, Prunty was forced to step down as head coach of the Great Britain men's national team after Eurobasket 2017. Under Prunty's tenure, the team went 12–42 overall with a 5–15 record in FIBA games. Despite the lackluster record, Prunty is credited with creating a close communication culture within the team that kept the program afloat during difficult times, with at least one player on record saying he would not have considered playing for the team without Prunty as head coach.

== Head coaching record ==
=== NBA ===
Legend
Regular season	G	Games coached	W	Games won	L	Games lost	W–L %	Win–loss %
Playoffs	PG	Playoff games	PW	Playoff wins	PL	Playoff losses	PW–L %	Playoff win–loss %

Team	Year	G	W	L	W–L%	Finish	PG	PW	PL	PW–L%	Result
Milwaukee	2017–18	37	21	16	.568	3rd in Central	7	3	4	.429	Lost in First Round
Atlanta	2022–23	2	2	0	1.000	(interim)	—	—	—	—	—
Milwaukee	2023–24	3	2	1	.667	(interim)	—	—	—	—	—
Career		42	25	17	.595		7	3	4	.429	

== Personal life ==
Prunty and his wife, Laura, have two children.
