= Matt Ryan (basketball) =

American basketball player (born 1997)

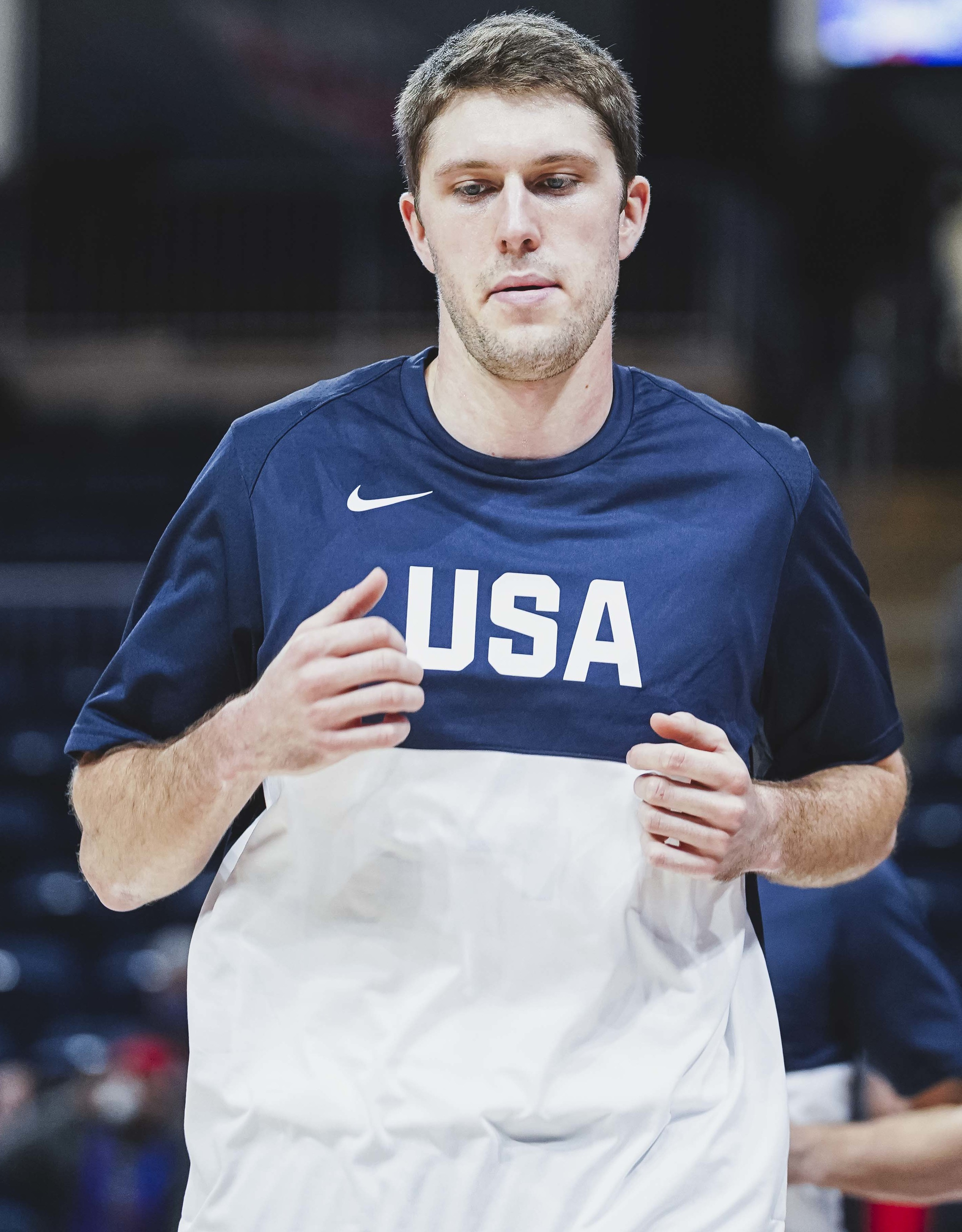
- Ryan with the United States in 2023

No. 32 – Maxima Roma
- Position: Small forward / power forward
- League: LBA; EuroCup

Personal information
- Born: April 17, 1997 (age 29) Valhalla, New York, U.S.
- Listed height: 6 ft 7 in (2.01 m)
- Listed weight: 215 lb (98 kg)

Career information
- High school: Iona Prep (New Rochelle, New York)
- College: Notre Dame (2015–2017); Vanderbilt (2018–2019); Chattanooga (2019–2020)
- NBA draft: 2020: undrafted
- Playing career: 2020–present

Career history
- 2021–2022: Grand Rapids Gold
- 2022: Boston Celtics
- 2022: →Maine Celtics
- 2022: Los Angeles Lakers
- 2022–2023: Minnesota Timberwolves
- 2022–2023: →Iowa Wolves
- 2023–2024: New Orleans Pelicans
- 2023–2024: →Birmingham Squadron
- 2024–2025: New York Knicks
- 2024–2025: →Westchester Knicks
- 2025–2026: Dubai Basketball
- 2026–present: Maxima Roma

Career highlights
- Second-team All-SoCon (2020); First-team Parade All-American (2015); Mr. New York Basketball (2015)
- Stats at NBA.com
- Stats at Basketball Reference

Matthew Richard Ryan (born April 17, 1997) is an American professional basketball player for Maxima Roma of the Italian Lega Basket Serie A (LBA) and the EuroCup. He played college basketball for the Notre Dame Fighting Irish, Vanderbilt Commodores, and Chattanooga Mocs.

== High school career ==
Ryan attended Iona Preparatory School where he led the Gaels to a 22–6 record en route to the program's first Class AA Archdiocesan Championship while averaging 20 points, eight rebounds, and five assists per game as a senior, while also being named Mr. New York Basketball. He was also named a first-team Parade All-American.

== College career ==
Ryan began his college career at Notre Dame, where he played sparingly before transferring to Vanderbilt after his sophomore season. As a junior, he averaged 8.1 points and 2.7 rebounds per game. Following the season, Ryan transferred to Chattanooga. As a senior, he had his best season, playing 33 games and averaging 15.4 points, 4.9 rebounds, and 1.9 assists in 30.6 minutes per game, while shooting 42.3 percent from the field, 35.9 percent from three-point range and 87.9 percent from the free-throw line.

== Professional career ==
Ryan went undrafted in the 2020 NBA draft. His prospects were limited by the COVID-19 pandemic, and he did not land a spot in the G League's bubble in 2020–21. He resorted to working for DoorDash and UberEats while coaching a grassroots basketball team. He also worked at a cemetery in Yonkers, New York.

=== Grand Rapids Gold (2021–2022) ===
Ryan joined the Cleveland Cavaliers for the 2021 NBA Summer League and spent preseason with the Denver Nuggets. He subsequently joined the Grand Rapids Gold of the G League for the 2021–22 season. He averaged 15.8 points in 28 games for the Gold.

=== Boston Celtics / Maine Celtics (2022) ===
On February 28, 2022, Ryan signed a two-way contract with the Boston Celtics. He averaged 20.4 points in 14 games for the Maine Red Claws to finish the 2021–22 NBA G League season. He made his first and only appearance for the Celtics on April 10, 2022, against the Memphis Grizzlies, scoring three points in five minutes. The Celtics made it to the 2022 NBA Finals, where they lost to the Golden State Warriors in six games.

Ryan joined the Celtics for the 2022 NBA Summer League.

=== Los Angeles Lakers (2022) ===
On September 26, 2022, Ryan signed with the Los Angeles Lakers. He made 37.5% of his 3-pointers in the preseason and earned the final spot on the team's 15-man roster out of training camp. On November 2, he hit a corner 3-pointer to tie the game at the regulation buzzer against the New Orleans Pelicans, with the Lakers going on to win 120–117 in overtime. He had missed six of his first seven 3-point attempts against the Pelicans and finished the game with 11 points. Ryan was waived by the Lakers on December 1.

=== Minnesota Timberwolves / Iowa Wolves (2022–2023) ===
On December 8, 2022, Ryan signed a two-way contract with the Minnesota Timberwolves.

On September 28, 2023, Ryan re-signed with the Timberwolves on another two-way contract, but was waived on October 20.

=== New Orleans Pelicans / Birmingham Squadron (2023–2024) ===
On October 22, 2023, Ryan was claimed off waivers by the New Orleans Pelicans and subsequently signed to a two-way contract. On November 2, Ryan had his first NBA start against the Pistons and on April 13, 2024, he signed a standard contract with the Pelicans. On August 24, he was waived by the Pelicans, but was re-signed three days later, but was waived again on October 11.

=== New York Knicks / Westchester Knicks (2024–2025) ===
On October 26, 2024, Ryan joined the Westchester Knicks after being selected first overall in the 2024 NBA G League draft and on November 4, he signed with the New York Knicks. Throughout the season, he was assigned several times to Westchester and on December 22, he was waived by New York. However, two days later, he signed a two-way contract with the Knicks. On March 2, 2025, the Knicks waived Ryan.

On September 16, 2025, Ryan signed an Exhibit 10 contract with the Knicks. He was waived by the Knicks prior to the start of the regular season on October 18.

=== Dubai Basketball (2025–2026) ===
On November 8, 2025, Ryan signed with Dubai Basketball of the ABA League and the EuroLeague.

=== Maxima Roma (2026–present) ===
On August 6, 2026, Ryan signed a one-year contract with Maxima Roma of the Italian Lega Basket Serie A (LBA).

== Career statistics ==
Legend
| GP | Games played | GS | Games started | MPG | Minutes per game |
| FG% | Field goal percentage | 3P% | 3-point field goal percentage | FT% | Free throw percentage |
| RPG | Rebounds per game | APG | Assists per game | SPG | Steals per game |
| BPG | Blocks per game | PPG | Points per game | **Bold** | Career high |

=== NBA ===
==== Regular season ====
| Year | Team | GP | GS | MPG | FG% | 3P% | FT% | RPG | APG | SPG | BPG | PPG |
|---|---|---|---|---|---|---|---|---|---|---|---|---|
| 2021–22 | Boston | 1 | 0 | 5.3 | .200 | .200 | — | .0 | .0 | **1.0** | .0 | 3.0 |
| 2022–23 | L.A. Lakers | 12 | 0 | 10.8 | .306 | .371 | .800 | 1.2 | .3 | .2 | .0 | 3.9 |
| 2022–23 | Minnesota | 22 | 0 | 8.2 | .424 | .388 | .857 | .5 | .5 | .1 | .0 | 3.4 |
| 2023–24 | New Orleans | **28** | **1** | **13.9** | **.434** | **.451** | .929 | **1.4** | **.6** | .2 | .0 | **5.4** |
| 2024–25 | New York | 19 | 0 | 3.6 | .323 | .316 | **1.000** | .4 | .2 | .1 | .0 | 1.5 |
| Career | | 82 | 1 | 9.4 | .389 | .402 | .893 | .9 | .5 | .2 | .0 | 3.7 |

==== Playoffs ====
| Year | Team | GP | GS | MPG | FG% | 3P% | FT% | RPG | APG | SPG | BPG | PPG |
|---|---|---|---|---|---|---|---|---|---|---|---|---|
| 2024 | New Orleans | 1 | 0 | 2.5 | .000 | .000 | — | 1.0 | .0 | 1.0 | .0 | .0 |
| Career | | 1 | 0 | 2.5 | .000 | .000 | — | 1.0 | .0 | 1.0 | .0 | .0 |

=== College ===
| Year | Team | GP | GS | MPG | FG% | 3P% | FT% | RPG | APG | SPG | BPG | PPG |
|---|---|---|---|---|---|---|---|---|---|---|---|---|
| 2015–16 | Notre Dame | **36** | 4 | 14.5 | .417 | .374 | .792 | 1.7 | .5 | .3 | **.1** | 5.1 |
| 2016–17 | Notre Dame | **36** | 0 | 7.9 | **.434** | **.434** | **.900** | .9 | .4 | .2 | .0 | 3.6 |
| 2017–18 | Vanderbilt | Redshirt | | | | | | | | | | |
| 2018–19 | Vanderbilt | 29 | 25 | 24.9 | .347 | .328 | .750 | 2.7 | .9 | .3 | **.1** | 8.1 |
| 2019–20 | Chattanooga | 33 | **33** | **30.6** | .423 | .359 | .879 | **4.9** | **1.9** | **.4** | **.1** | **15.4** |
| Career | | 134 | 62 | 18.9 | .404 | .363 | .842 | 2.5 | .9 | .3 | .1 | 7.9 |

== Personal life ==
He is the son of Richard and Laurie Ryan and has two siblings, Mikela and Michael. He earned a bachelor's degree in economics at Vanderbilt and worked on his MBA at Chattanooga.
