= Daniel Clark (basketball) =

British basketball player

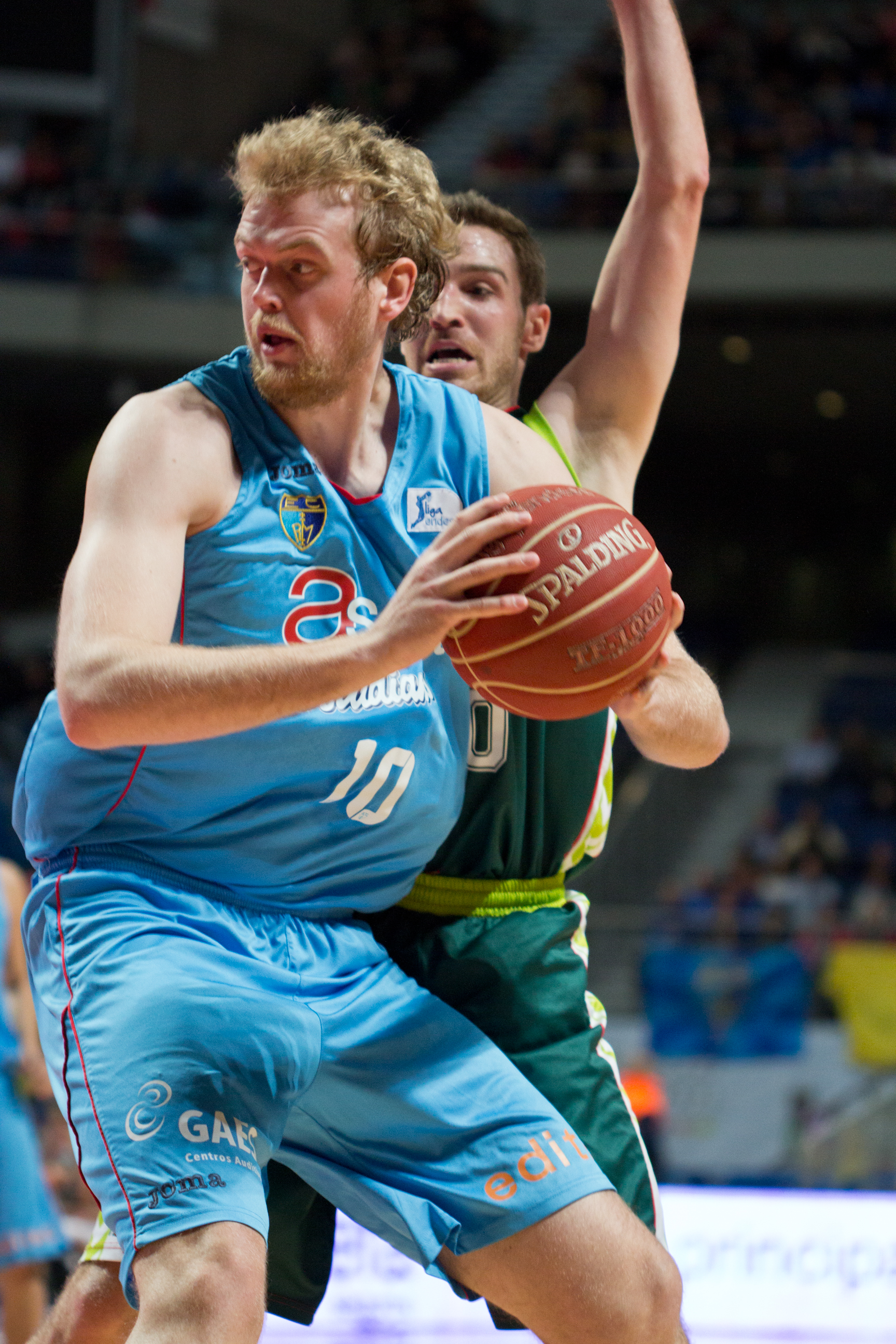
- Clark playing for Estudiantes in 2013

Personal information
- Born: 16 September 1988 (age 37) London, England
- Listed height: 6 ft 10 3/4 in (2.10 m)
- Listed weight: 210 lb (95 kg)

Career information
- NBA draft: 2010: undrafted
- Playing career: 2006–2022
- Position: Power forward

Career history
- 2006–2013: Estudiantes
- 2007–2008: →Breogán
- 2009: →Breogán
- 2013: Baskonia
- 2013–2014: CAI Zaragoza
- 2014–2015: Fuenlabrada
- 2015–2016: MoraBanc Andorra
- 2016–2017: MZT Skopje
- 2017: UCAM Murcia
- 2017–2018: Gipuzkoa Basket
- 2018–2019: Fuenlabrada
- 2019–2021: MoraBanc Andorra
- 2021: Real Betis
- 2021–2022: Manchester Giants

Daniel Mark Clark (born 16 September 1988) is a retired British professional basketball player who was a member of the Great Britain national team. He is a former Great Britain senior team captain, and finished his international career as all-time leader in men's appearances (119), points (1,100), rebounds (555), blocked shots, field goals made, 2-point field goals made and 3-point field goals made.

== Early life ==
Clark is from a well-known British basketball family, his father Mark coached the GB national women's team from 2006 to 2009 and his mother played for the national team. His sister Ella Clark is also an international basketball player. Clark decided to reject the chance to play college basketball in the United States and instead opted to accept an invitation to play at the academy of Spanish ACB club, CB Estudiantes. Before this, he attended Chingford Foundation School.

== Professional career ==
Coming through the Spanish club's junior ranks, Clark made his full debut in the ACB in December 2006 before spending loan spells in the Spanish second division with the Estudiantes farm team CB Breogan in the 2007–08 and 2008–09 seasons. Since the start of the 2009–10 Clark established himself into the regular rotation for CB Estudiantes and then into the starting five.

On 20 October 2016 Clark signed with Macedonian club MZT Skopje Aerodrom. On 1 March 2017, he left MZT. On 9 March 2017, he signed with UCAM Murcia for the rest of the 2016–17 ACB season.

On 28 August 2017 Clark signed with San Sebastián Gipuzkoa for the 2017–18 ACB season.

On 5 December 2019 he signed a 2-month contract with MoraBanc Andorra of the Liga ACB.

On 16 January 2021 he signed with Real Betis of the Liga ACB. before finishing his career with a season at Manchester Giants.

== International career ==
Clark represented England and Great Britain at junior and under-20 levels, He earned his first cap for the Great Britain Men's National Team in the summer of 2009 and was part of the team that competed at the 2009 Eurobasket in Poland. Clark also represented Team GB at the 2012 Summer Olympics in London. Following the close of his career at EuroBasket 2022, he had accumulated 119 GB appearances, then a record for the men's team.
