= Carl Wheatle =

British basketball player

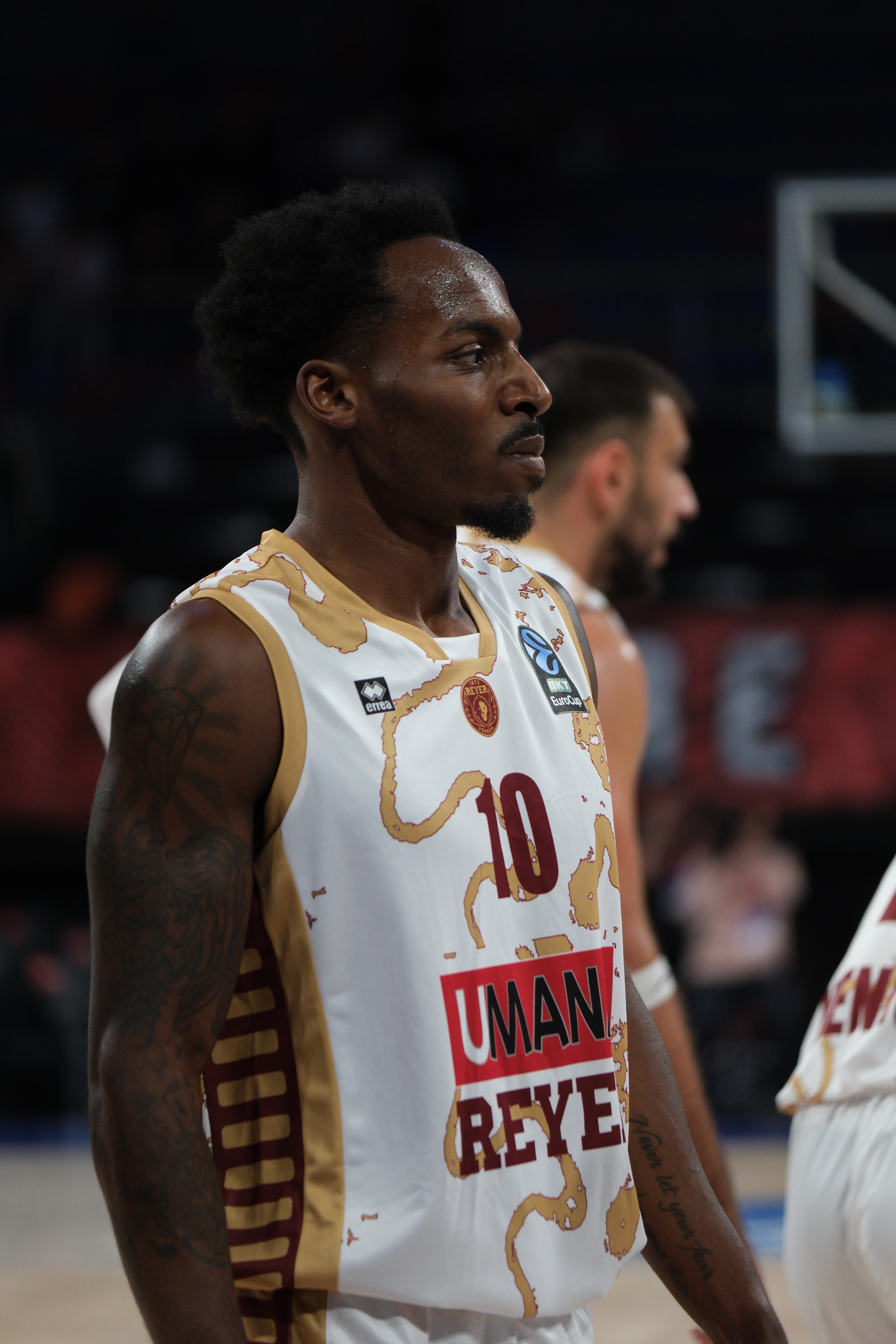
- Wheatle with Reyer Venezia in 2025

No. 24 – Maxima Roma
- Position: Small forward
- League: LBA; EuroCup

Personal information
- Born: 24 March 1998 (age 28) Lambeth, England
- Listed height: 2.00 m (6 ft 7 in)
- Listed weight: 194 lb (88 kg)

Career information
- Playing career: 2016–present

Career history
- 2016–2019: Biella
- 2019–2024: Pistoia 2000
- 2024–2026: Reyer Venezia
- 2026–present: Maxima Roma

Carl Anton Delroy Wheatle is a British basketball player for Maxima Roma of the Italian Lega Basket Serie A (LBA) and the EuroCup.

== Professional career ==
During the 2019–20 LBA season he played for OriOra Pistoia.

On 17 June 2024 he signed with Reyer Venezia of the Italian Lega Basket Serie A (LBA).

On August 11, 2026, Wheatle signed with Maxima Roma of the Italian Lega Basket Serie A (LBA).

== National team career ==
He has been a member of the Great Britain men's national team.
