= Maxima Roma =

- Leagues: LBA; EuroCup
- Founded: 2026
- History: Maxima Roma; 2026–present
- Arena: PalaEur
- Capacity: 11,200
- Location: Rome, Lazio, Italy
- Team colors: Gold, Black and White
- President: Paul Matiasic
- Head coach: Matteo Cotelli
- Website: maximaroma.it
Home	Away

Maxima Roma is an Italian professional basketball team based in Rome, Lazio. The club plays in the Lega Basket Serie A (LBA), the highest level of competition in Italy, and in the EuroCup.

== History ==
Maxima Roma was founded in 2026. The club was established through the acquisition and relocation of the sporting licence of Pallacanestro Brescia by American entrepreneur Paul Matiasic, following approval from the Italian Basketball Federation (FIP). The transaction transferred Brescia's Serie A licence to Rome, allowing the newly formed club to compete in the 2026–27 Lega Basket Serie A season.

Although the club inherited Brescia's sporting rights and league membership, Maxima Roma was created as a new organization with its own identity, branding and management. The establishment of Maxima Roma generated significant discussion within Italian basketball, as it brought an end to Pallacanestro Brescia's presence in the top division after years of success.

In September 2026, former AS Roma captain Francesco Totti officially joined Maxima Roma's management structure as a senior advisor to club ownership, with responsibilities centered on strategic development, institutional representation, and community engagement.

== Players ==
=== Current roster ===
Note: Flags indicate national team eligibility at FIBA-sanctioned events. Players may hold other non-FIBA nationalities not displayed.

Maxima Roma roster
Players
Coaches

Pos.	No.	Nat.	Name	Ht.	Wt.	Age
F/C	00	(United States)	Brown, John	2.03 m (6 ft 8 in)	98 kg (216 lb)	34 – 28 January 1992
C	2	(Croatia)	Bilan, Miro	2.13 m (7 ft 0 in)	121 kg (267 lb)	37 – 21 July 1989
PG	3	(United States)	Holiday, Aaron	1.83 m (6 ft 0 in)	84 kg (185 lb)	30 – 30 September 1996
PF	4	(United States)	Tyson, Hunter	2.03 m (6 ft 8 in)	98 kg (216 lb)	26 – 13 June 2000
SG	5	(United States) (Italy)	Alibegović, Mirza	1.95 m (6 ft 5 in)	88 kg (194 lb)	34 – 25 September 1992
PG	8	(Italy)	Carnevale, Francesco	1.96 m (6 ft 5 in)	89 kg (196 lb)	19 – 11 May 2007
SF	10	(Italy)	Bresciani, Andrea	2.02 m (6 ft 8 in)	97 kg (214 lb)	18 – 4 January 2008
SG	11	(United States) (Jamaica)	Lemar, Brynton	1.93 m (6 ft 4 in)	88 kg (194 lb)	31 – 23 January 1995
G/F	16	(Italy)	Veronesi, Giovanni	1.97 m (6 ft 6 in)	98 kg (216 lb)	28 – 21 March 1998
G	17	(United States)	Moon, Xavier	1.88 m (6 ft 2 in)	75 kg (165 lb)	31 – 2 January 1995
PG	23	(Italy)	Bonacini, Federico	1.90 m (6 ft 3 in)	88 kg (194 lb)	27 – 23 January 1999
SF	24	(United Kingdom)	Wheatle, Carl	2.00 m (6 ft 7 in)	88 kg (194 lb)	28 – 24 March 1998
C	29	(Italy)	Camara, Gora	2.14 m (7 ft 0 in)	114 kg (251 lb)	25 – 12 April 2001
F	32	(United States)	Ryan, Matt	2.01 m (6 ft 7 in)	98 kg (216 lb)	29 – 17 April 1997
PF	77	(Montenegro)	Dožić, Andrija	2.01 m (6 ft 7 in)	99 kg (218 lb)	19 – 28 July 2007

Head coach

- (Italy) Matteo Cotelli

Assistant coach(es)

- (Italy) Gianpaolo Alberti
- (Italy) Alessandro Lotesoriere

Legend

- (C) Team captain
- Injured

- Roster
Updated: October 3, 2026

=== Depth chart ===
Pos.	Starting 5	Bench 1	Bench 2	Bench 3
C	Miro Bilan °	Gora Camara †
PF	Hunter Tyson *	John Brown *		Andrija Dožić °
SF	Carl Wheatle °	Giovanni Veronesi †	Andrea Bresciani ‡	Matt Ryan *
SG	Aaron Holiday *	Mirza Alibegović †		Brynton Lemar ^
PG	Xavier Moon *	Federico Bonacini †	Francesco Carnevale †

Notes: LBA clubs can choose between two main roster composition and foreign player formulas:

- 5+5 Formula: 5 Italian players and 5 foreign players.
- 3+4+5 Formula: 5 Italian players, 3 non-EU (European Union) foreigners, and 4 EU foreigners (including countries from the Cotonou Agreement).

Blue † – Homegrown player; (Note: A homegrown player (known in Italy as an atleta di formazione italiana) is defined by where they received their basketball training, rather than their actual passport or nationality. To be officially classified as a homegrown player by the Italian Basketball Federation (FIP), an athlete must complete at least four seasons in an Italian club’s youth academy (between the ages of 14 and 21), appearing in a minimum of 14 games per season. In EuroCup, the team did not have any limitations regarding the number of Homegrown players.) Red * – Non-EU foreign player; (Note: A non-EU foreigner is a player from a country with no special trade or labor agreement with the European Union. In professional basketball, this primarily applies to players from the United States, Canada, Australia, and parts of Asia or non-EU Europe who do not possess a secondary European passport.) Purple °; – EU Foreign player (Note: "EU Foreign" players: An EU foreign player is a player who holds citizenship in a European Union (EU) member state (or an associated territory) but is not a citizen of the country where the league is based. Minimum of 4 EU Foreign players must be included on the active roster using the 3+4+5 formula) Gold ^; – Cotonou Agreement player (Note: "Cotonou Agreement" players: A Cotonou Agreement player (often called a "Cotonou player") is a basketball player who holds a passport from one of the 79 African, Caribbean, or Pacific (ACP) nations that signed the Cotonou Agreement with the European Union. In the LBA, these athletes are treated exactly like EU citizens and do not count against strict non-EU import quotas. The Cotonou Agreement is a political and trade treaty originally signed in 2000. Following a legal precedent known as the Kolpak ruling, European courts determined that citizens of countries with trade agreements guaranteeing non-discrimination against workers must have the same right to free movement of labor as EU citizens. Because of this ruling, if an LBA club chooses the 3+4+5 team-building formula, Cotonou players can be signed to fill the 4 EU foreigner roster spots, leaving the team’s 3 non-EU spots completely open for American or other traditional import players.) Green ‡ – youth player (Note: "Youth" players: players who are under the age of 20. In the context of European basketball and the LBA, youth players act as a bridge for clubs to fill out their active game-day rosters while meeting domestic requirements. To satisfy the "Italian player" requirement in the 5+5 or 3+4+5 formulas, a player does not technically have to be born in Italy. They can qualify as "homegrown" (Italian-trained) if they spent at least three consecutive seasons in an Italian club's youth academy between the ages of 15 and 21.)
