= Malcolm Finlay =

British basketball player (1919–2007)

Personal information
- Nationality: British
- Born: February 1919 South Shields, England
- Died: 3 November 2007 (aged 88) Chichester, England

Sport
- Sport: Basketball

Malcolm Finlay (February 1919 – 3 November 2007) was a British basketball player. He competed in the men's tournament at the 1948 Summer Olympics. Findlay also served as a commissioned officer in the Royal Canadian Naval Volunteer Reserve during the Second World War.
