= Ben Mockford =

British basketball player

No. 4 – Newcastle Eagles
- Position: Shooting guard
- League: BBL

Personal information
- Born: 18 August 1989 (age 35); Shoreham-by-Sea, England
- Listed height: 6 ft 2 in (1.88 m)
- Listed weight: 78 kg (172 lb)

Career information
- High school: Oak Hill Academy (Mouth of Wilson, Virginia)
- College: Iona (2009–2010); St. Francis Brooklyn (2011–2014)
- NBA draft: 2014: undrafted
- Playing career: 2014–present

Career history
- 2014–2015: Cáceres
- 2014–2015: Plymouth Raiders
- 2015–2016: Cáceres
- 2016–2018: CB Bahía San Agustín
- 2018–2019: ASK Karditsas B.C.
- 2019–2020: Cheshire Phoenix
- 2020–2021: Bristol Flyers
- 2021–2022: Cheshire Phoenix
- 2022: LYONSO
- 2022–present: Newcastle Eagles

Ben Mockford (born 18 August 1989) is a British basketball player for Newcastle Eagles of the British Basketball League (BBL) and the Great Britain national team.

== Professional career ==
On 10 December 2020, Mockford signed a short-term contract with the Bristol Flyers for the 2020–21 BBL season. On 27 October 2021, he signed with Cheshire Phoenix of the BBL.

In August 2022, Mockford signed with the Newcastle Eagles.

== National team career ==
Mockford earned his first cap for the Great Britain national team in an international friendly against Latvia in Worcester, England, on 19 July 2014. Mockford had his first stellar performance with the team during an FIBA EuroBasket 2015 qualifier against Bosnia and Herzegovina, scoring 19 points on 5/8 shooting from three point range. He was a regular member of head coach Joe Prunty's squads from 2014 to 2017, and was selected to play for GB at the FIBA EuroBasket 2017.
