= 2019 Albanian Basketball Cup =

Basketball tournament in Albania

2019 Albanian Basketball Cup 2019
Tournament details
- Arena: Feti Borova Sport Hall; Tirana, Albania
- Dates: 12 January 2019– 2 February 2019

Final positions
- Champions: Teuta (3rd title)
- Runners-up: Goga Basket

The Albanian Basketball Cup 2019 is the 63rd edition of the Albanian Basketball Cup, the top annual basketball cup competition played by Albanian teams and organized under the authority of the Albanian Basketball Association (FSHB).

Tirana was the defending champion, while Teuta won the competition after 52 years, 1965 was the last time Teuta won the Albanian Basketball Cup.

== Competition format ==
The Basketball Cup 2019 is played at the middle of the season, when the league is paused for the cup. The mid-season standing is taken into account to pair the matches.

All the Albanian teams from the Superliga and First Division compete for the Cup. Each game is played once in a single knock-out game.

There is a first round of qualification played by the teams from the First Division, from which only two teams qualify to the final bracket phase played against the teams from the First Division.

The qualification and quarter finals rounds are hosted in the court of the higher ranked team, while the Final 4 are played in a neutral court, in two consecutive days (1st and 2 February 2019) in Tirana, at the Feti Borova Sport Hall in the Tirana Olympic Park.

== Teams and ranking ==
2019 Albanian Basketball Cup teams. In the city of Tirana there are four teams:
- Tirana
- Partizani
- Eagles
- Invaders

At the middle (10 games played of 20 total) of the season the following teams will play the championship as ranked in the Superliga and First Division:

=== Mid-season standing of Superliga ===
Pos	Team	Points	City	Classification
1	Goga Basket	18	Durrës	Quarter-finals against winning from First Division
2	Partizani	17	Tirana	Quarter-finals against winning from First Division
3	Teuta	17	Durrës	Quarter-finals
4	Tirana	14	Tirana	Quarter-finals
5	Kamza	13	Kamëz	Quarter-finals
6	Vllaznia	11	Shkodër	Quarter-finals

=== Mid-season standing of First Division ===
Pos	Team	Points	City	Classification
1	Eagles	19	Tirana	Directly to the 2nd round of qualification
2	Invaders	19	Tirana	Directly to the 2nd round of qualification
3	Flamurtari	14	Vlorë	From the first round of qualification
4	Skënderbeu	14	Korçë	From the first round of qualification
5	Elbasani	13	Elbasan	From the first round of qualification
6	Apollonia	11	Fier	From the first round of qualification

== Brackets ==
1st Qualification
12 January 2019
Flamurtari	49
Apollonia	51
12 January 2019
Skënderbeu	20
Elbasani	0

2nd Qualification
16 January 2019
Invaders	91
Apollonia	66
16 January 2019
Eagles	82
Skënderbeu	43

Quarter-finals
24 January 2019
Tirana	85
Kamza	75
24 January 2019
Goga Basket	131
Invaders	82
24 January 2019
Partizani	96
Eagles	51
27 January 2019
Teuta	88
Vllaznia	83

Semi-finals
1 February 2019
Tirana	81
Goga Basket	96
1 February 2019
Partizani	72
Teuta	75

Final
2 February 2019
Goga Basket	81
Teuta	95

== Final ==
The final is played between Teuta and Goga Basket, both from Durrës. Goga Basket was at its first participation in the competition, as the team has participated to the Albanian Albanian Superlica for the first time.

3 February 2019 Final	Goga Basket	81–95	Teuta	Tirana
19:00 (CET)	Scoring by quarter: 30–26, 20–24, 7–19, 24–26
RTSH	Pts: Griffin Ramme 18; Rebs: Aleksander Milic 8 Asts: Aleksander Milic 4	Boxscore	Pts: Erik Copes 24; Rebs: Erik Copes 12; Asts: Erik Copes 5	Arena: Feti Borova

Starters:			Pts	Reb	Ast
F	9	(Albania) Niko Thano	17	1	1
PG	11	(United States) Griffin Ramme	19	7	3
C	13	(Montenegro) Aleksander Milic	11	8	4
F	23	(Serbia) Nikola Dokovic	13	2	1
G	25	(United States) Aaron Williams	4	2	1
Reserves:					
C	00	(United States) Kevin Allen	12	5	0
	5	(Albania) Hidajet Elezi	DNP		
F	8	(Albania) Marsel Aliaj	0	0	0
G	10	(Albania) Denis Veselagu	0	0	0
C	12	(Albania) Klevis Isaku	DNP		
C	14	(Albania) Herion Faslija	DNP		
G	24	(Albania) Ilmi Pasha	6	3	2
Head coach:
(Basketball Federation of Montenegro) Nikola Milatovic

Goga Basket	Teuta

Goga	Statistics	Teuta
17/30 (56.7%)	2 point field goals	24/43 (55.8%)
10/25 (40.0%)	3 point field goals	9/19 (47.4.0%)
17/25 (68.0%)	Free throws	20/28 (71.4%)
32	Rebounds	33
11	Assists	14
6	Steals	4
6	Turnovers	7
2	Blocks	3

Game rules
Game played under FIBA rules.

2019 Albanian Cup Winners

Teuta
3rd title

Starters:			Pts	Reb	Ast
PG	2	(United States) C.J. Wilson	19	7	5
SF	4	(Albania) Kristi Gorea	7	0	0
SG	11	(Albania) Genti Lasku	9	1	1
C	14	(Albania) Endrit Hysenagolli	15	8	1
PF	22	(United States) Erik Copes	24	12	1
Reserves:					
G/F	1	(United States) Tevin Broyles	DNP		
PG	7	(Albania) Robert Shestani	5	0	1
PF	8	(Albania) Julian Hamati	4	2	1
PG	10	(Albania) Bruno Hoxha	DNP		
PF	17	(Albania) Renato Mirdita	DNP		
SG	23	(United States) Kevin Brown	12	2	4
PF	44	(Albania) Andi Sabahi	DNP		
Head coach:
(Basketball Federation of Montenegro) Miodrag Baletić
