= 2020–21 Liga Unike =

Liga Unike
- Season: 2020–21
- Dates: 6–14 April 2021
- Games played: 7
- Teams: 7
- TV partner(s): Artmotion, Kujtesa and RTSH

Finals
- Champions: Ylli (1st title)
- Runners-up: Peja
- Semifinalists: Rahoveci and Goga Basket
- Finals MVP: Erjon Kastrati

Records
- Biggest home win: Rahoveci 81–74 Goga Basket (14 April 2021)
- Biggest away win: Vllaznia 73–90 Peja (6 April 2021)
- Highest scoring: Vllaznia 73–90 Peja (6 April 2021)
- Winning streak: Ylli (3 matches)
- Losing streak: Goga Basket (2 matches)
- Lowest attendance: 0

Seasons
- 2021–22 →
- All statistics correct as of 14 April 2021.

The 2020–21 Liga Unike was the inaugural season of the Liga Unike, a professional basketball league in Albania and Kosovo. It started on 6 April 2021 with the quarter-finals and ended on 14 April 2021 with the finals.

== Teams ==
Top four teams from 2019–20 Albanian Basketball Superleague and 2019–20 Kosovo Basketball Superleague respectively will participate in the competition. On 5 April 2021, Teuta Durrës withdrew from the competition due to the inability to organize for a short time.

=== Venues and locations ===
Locations of the 2020–21 Liga Unike teams

Note: Table lists in alphabetical order.

| Team | Town | Arena and capacity | | Qualified as |
|---|---|---|---|---|
| (Albania) Goga Basket | Xhafzotaj (Shijak) | Dhimitraq Goga Sports Palace | 700 | Runner-up of ABSL |
| (Kosovo) Peja | Peja | Karagaq Sports Hall | 2,500 | Fourth place of KBSL |
| (Kosovo) Prishtina | Pristina | Palace of Youth and Sports | 3,000 | Champion of KBSL |
| (Kosovo) Rahoveci | Rahovec | Mizahir Izma Sports Hall | 1,800 | Runner-up of KBSL |
| (Albania) ~~Teuta Durrës~~ | ~~Durrës~~ | ~~Ramazan Njala Sports Palace~~ | ~~2,000~~ | ~~Champion of ABSL~~ |
| (Albania) Tirana | Tirana | Farie Hoti Sports Palace | 1,200 | Fifth place of ABSL |
| (Albania) Vllaznia | Shkodër | Qazim Dervishi Sports Palace | 1,200 | Third place of ABSL |
| (Kosovo) Ylli | Suva Reka | 13 June Sports Hall | 1,800 | Third place of KBSL |

Notes

- ABSL = Albanian Basketball Superleague
- KBSL = Kosovo Basketball Superleague

== Playoff ==
=== Bracket ===
The competition will take place in the Final Eight format with single elimination system and the first quarterfinal matches will be played in Rahovec on 6 and 7 April 2021, while the semifinal matches, the race for third place and the grand final of the Liga Unike will take place on 13 and 14 April in Durrës.

Quarter-finals
6 April – (Kosovo) Rahovec
(Albania) Vllaznia | 73
(Kosovo) Peja | 90
6 April – (Kosovo) Rahovec
(Kosovo) Rahoveci | 20
(Albania) Teuta Durrës | 0
7 April – (Kosovo) Rahovec
(Kosovo) Prishtina | 70
(Kosovo) Ylli | 87
7 April – (Kosovo) Rahovec
(Albania) Goga Basket | 76
(Albania) Tirana | 67

Semi-finals
13 April – (Albania) Durrës
(Kosovo) Rahoveci | 71
(Kosovo) Peja | 73
13 April – (Albania) Durrës
(Albania) Goga Basket | 74
(Kosovo) Ylli | 86

Finals
14 April – (Albania) Durrës
(Kosovo) Peja | 79
(Kosovo) Ylli | 82
Third place
14 April – (Albania) Durrës
(Kosovo) Rahoveci | 81
(Albania) Goga Basket | 74

== Season statistics ==
=== Individual game highs ===
| Category | Player | Team | Statistic |
|---|---|---|---|
| Points | (United States) Darrell Davis | (Kosovo) Rahoveci | 48 |
| Rebounds | (United States) Brandon Walters | (Kosovo) Peja | 38 |
| Assists | (Kosovo) Valon Bunjaku | (Kosovo) Prishtina | 11 |
| Steals | (United States) Elyjah Clark | (Kosovo) Ylli | 7 |
| Blocks | (United States) Brandon Walters | (Kosovo) Peja | 4 |

== Notes and references ==
=== Notes ===
1. Due to the COVID-19 pandemic in Albania and Kosovo, all this season matches are played behind closed doors.
