= List of indoor arenas in Albania =

The following is a list of indoor arenas in Albania, ranked by capacity.

== Current arenas ==
| Rank | Arena | City | Capacity | Home team(s) | Opened | Image |
|---|---|---|---|---|---|---|
| 1 | Asllan Rusi Sports Palace; Pallati i Sportit "Asllan Rusi" | Tirana | 4,000 | PBC Tirana | 1950 | |
| 2 | Tamara Nikolla Sports Palace; Pallati i Sportit "Tamara Nikolla" | Korçë | 2,400 | KV Skënderbeu | 1975 | |
| 3 | Tomorr Sinani Sports Palace; Pallati i Sportit "Tomorr Sinani" | Elbasan | 2,130 | BC Elbasani | 1982 | |
| 4 | Flamurtari Sports Palace; Pallati i Sportit "Flamurtari" | Vlorë | 2,040 | KB Flamurtari | 1978 | |
| 5 | Ramazan Njala Sports Palace; Pallati i Sportit "Ramazan Njala" | Durrës | 1,663 | BC Teuta | | |
| 6 | Bashkim Lala Sports Palace; Pallati i Sportit "Bashkim Lala" | Peshkopi | 1,246 | | 2014 | |
| 7 | Feti Borova Sports Hall; Salla e Sportit "Feti Borova" | Tirana | 1,200 | Albania national team | 2017 | |
| 8 | Qazim Dervishi Sports Palace; Pallati i Sporteve "Qazim Dervishi" | Shkodër | 1,101 | BC Vllaznia | 1969 | |
| 9 | Farie Hoti Sports Palace; Pallati i Sportit "Farie Hoti" | Tirana | 1,200 | KB Tirana | 2013 | |
| 10 | Luftëtari Sports Palace; Pallati i Sportit "Luftëtari" | Gjirokastër | 900 | | 1985 | |
| 11 | Gramsh Sports Palace; Pallati i Sportit "Gramsh" | Gramsh | 850 | | | |
| 12 | Arjana Arapi Sports Palace; Pallati i Sportit "Arjan Arapi" | Rrëshen | 800 | KV Minatori | 1985 | |
| 13 | Dhimitraq Goga Sports Palace; Pallati i Sportit "Dhimitraq Goga" | Xhafzotaj | 700 | Goga Basket | 2018 | |
| 14 | Arefi Berberi Sports Palace; Pallati i Sportit "Arefi Berberi" | Pogradec | 700 | | | |
| 15 | Fier Sports Palace; Pallati i Sportit "Fier" | Fier | 680 | KB Apolonia | u/c | |
| 16 | Valbona Sports Palace; Pallati i Sportit "Valbona" | Bajram Curri | 600 | | u/c | |
| 17 | Përmet Sports Palace; Pallati i Sportit "Përmet" | Përmet | 600 | | 1984 | |
| 18 | Ferit Hysa Sports Palace; Pallati i Sportit "Ferit Hysa" | Burrel | 600 | | | |
| 19 | Pukë Sports Palace; Pallati i Sportit "Pukë" | Pukë | 500 | | 2018 | |
| 20 | Bathore Sports Hall; Salla e Sportit "Bathore" | Kamëz | 500 | BC Kamza Basket | 2013 | |
| 21 | Tepelenë Sports Palace; Pallati i Sportit "Tepelenë" | Tepelenë | 400 | | u/c | |

== See also ==
- List of indoor arenas in Europe
- List of indoor arenas by capacity
