= 2021–22 Liga Unike =

Liga Unike
- Season: 2021–22
- Dates: 23 October 2021 – 21 April 2022
- Games played: 19
- Teams: 8

Finals
- Champions: Peja
- Runners-up: Ylli
- Semifinalists: Prizreni-16 and Teuta Durrës

Seasons
- ← 2020–21 2022–23 →

The 2021–22 Liga Unike was the second season of the Liga Unike, a professional basketball league in Albania and Kosovo. The season began on 23 October 2021 and will end in 2022.

== Teams ==
Top four teams from 2020–21 Albanian Basketball Superleague and 2020–21 Kosovo Basketball Superleague respectively will participate in the competition.

=== Venues and locations ===
Locations of the 2021–22 Liga Unike teams

Note: Table lists in alphabetical order.

Team	Town	Arena and capacity		Qualified as
(Albania) Kamza	Kamëz	Bathore Sports Hall	500	Champion of AFD
(Kosovo) Peja	Peja	Karagaq Sports Hall	2,500	Fourth place of KSL
(Kosovo) Prizreni-16	Prizren	Sezai Surroi Sports Hall	3,200	Champion of KSL
(Kosovo) Rahoveci	Rahovec	Mizahir Izma Sports Hall	1,800	Runner-up of KSL
(Albania) Teuta Durrës	Durrës	Ramazan Njala Sports Palace	2,000	Runner-up of ASL
(Albania) Tirana	Tirana	Farie Hoti Sports Palace	1,200	Fourth place of ASL
(Albania) Vllaznia	Shkodër	Qazim Dervishi Sports Palace	1,200	Third place of ASL
(Kosovo) Ylli	Suva Reka	13 June Sports Hall	1,800	Third place of KSL

Notes

- ASL = Albanian Superleague
- AFD = Albanian First Division
- KSL = Kosovo Superleague

== Regular season ==
=== Standings ===
Pos	Team	Pld	W	L	PF	PA	PD	Pts	Qualification
1	(Kosovo) Ylli	14	13	1	1202	996	+206	27	Qualification for the Play-Offs
2	(Kosovo) Peja	14	9	5	1278	1127	+151	23	Qualification for the Play-Offs
3	(Kosovo) Prizreni-16	14	8	6	1238	1240	−2	22	Qualification for the Play-Offs
4	(Albania) Teuta Durrës	14	7	7	1232	1184	+48	21	Qualification for the Play-Offs
5	(Albania) Tirana	14	7	7	1153	1225	−72	21	Qualification for the Play-Offs
6	(Kosovo) Rahoveci	14	7	7	1261	1202	+59	21	Qualification for the Play-Offs
7	(Albania) Vllaznia	14	3	11	1051	1210	−159	17	
8	(Albania) Kamza	14	2	12	1085	1316	−231	16	

Source: Eurobasket

== Play-offs ==
Quarter-finals		Semi-finals	Final	Third place
First	Second	Semi-finals	Final	Third place
(Kosovo) Rahoveci 93-98 Prizreni-16 (Kosovo)	(Albania) Teuta Durrës 96-81 Tirana (Albania)	(Kosovo) Ylli 84-82 Teuta Durrës (Albania)	(Kosovo) Peja 87-72 Ylli (Kosovo)	(Albania) Teuta Durrës 89-106 Prizreni-16 (Kosovo)
(Albania) Tirana 73-78 Teuta Durrës (Albania)	(Kosovo) Prizreni-16 86-87 Rahoveci (Kosovo)	(Kosovo) Peja 98-94 Prizreni-16 (Kosovo)	(Kosovo) Peja 87-72 Ylli (Kosovo)	(Albania) Teuta Durrës 89-106 Prizreni-16 (Kosovo)
