= 2017–18 Albanian Basketball Superleague =

Albanian Basketball Superleague
- Season: 2017–18
- Duration: 13 October 2017 – 13 May 2018
- Teams: 6
- TV partners: Telesport; TVSH

Regular season
- Relegated: Eagles

Finals
- Champions: Tirana (20th title)
- Runners-up: Teuta

The 2017–18 Albanian Basketball Superleague, is the 52nd season of the top professional basketball league in Albania.

League started on 13 October 2017 and will end on 13 May 2018.

== Competition format ==
The six clubs played a four-legged round robin tournament where the four first qualified teams would advance to the playoffs.

The fifth qualified team faced the runner-up of the second division in a best-of-three games playoff for avoiding relegation, and the last qualified team was directly relegated.

== Clubs and arenas ==
Locations of the 2017–18 Albanian Superliga teams

Club	Location	Founded	Colours	Arena	Capacity	Head coach
Eagles	Tirana			Farie Hoti Sports Palace	3,000	
Kamza	Kamëz	1962		Bathore Sports Hall	500	(Albania) Adem Muhametaj
Partizani	Tirana	1946		Asllan Rusi Sports Palace	3,000	(Albania) E.Ismeti
Teuta	Durrës	1925		Ramazan Njala Sports Palace	1,000	(Albania) Artan Kalaja
Tirana	Tirana	1946		Farie Hoti Sports Palace	3,000	(Albania) Bujar Shehu
Vllaznia	Shkodër	1919		Qazim Dërvishi Sports Palace	1,200	(Albania) Bledar Gjeçaj

== Regular season ==
=== League table ===
Pos	Team	Pld	W	L	PF	PA	PD	Pts	Qualification or relegation
1	Tirana	20	19	1	1654	1251	+403	39	Qualification to playoffs
2	Teuta	20	13	7	1534	1370	+164	33	Qualification to playoffs
3	Partizani	20	13	7	1358	1233	+125	33	Qualification to playoffs
4	Kamza	20	8	12	1371	1396	−25	28	Qualification to playoffs
5	Vllaznia (O)	20	7	13	1459	1434	+25	27	Relegation playoffs
6	Eagles (Note: Retired after 13 rounds. The rest of the games were imposed with a 0–20 loss.) (R)	20	0	20	785	1593	−808	20	Relegation to First Division

Source: FSHB
(O) Play-off winners; (R) Relegated

== Playoffs ==
The semi-finals were played in a best-of-three playoff format and the finals in a best-of-five playoff format (1-1-1-1-1).

=== Bracket ===
Semi-finals
1 Tirana	2
4 Kamza	0
2 Teuta	2
3 Partizani	0

Finals
1 Tirana	3
2 Teuta	2

=== Semi-finals ===
Team 1	Series	Team 2	Game 1	Game 2	Game 3
Tirana	2–0	Kamza	93–78	89–86	
Teuta	2–0	Partizani	77–69	75–74	

=== Finals ===
Team 1	Series	Team 2	Game 1	Game 2	Game 3	Game 4	Game 5
Tirana	3–2	Teuta	73–76	74–71	76–74	73–83	68–60

== Relegation playoffs ==
Team 1	Series	Team 2	Game 1	Game 2	Game 3
Vllaznia	2–0	Flamurtari	90–47	89–49	
