= 2018–19 Albanian Basketball Superleague =

Albanian Basketball Superleague
- Season: 2018–19
- Duration: 7 October 2018 – May 2019
- Teams: 6
- TV partners: Telesport; TVSH

Regular season
- Relegated: Kamza

Finals
- Champions: Goga (1st title)
- Runners-up: Teuta

The 2018–19 Albanian Basketball Superleague, is the 53rd season of the top professional basketball league in Albania.

== Competition format ==
The six clubs played a four-legged round robin tournament where the four first qualified teams would advance to the playoffs.

The fifth qualified team faced the runner-up of the second division in a best-of-three games playoff for avoiding relegation, and the last qualified team was directly relegated.

== Clubs and arenas ==
Locations of the 2018–19 Albanian Superliga teams

Club	Location	Founded	Colours	Arena	Capacity	Head coach
Goga	Durrës	2015		Ramazan Njala Sports Palace	1,000	
Kamza	Kamëz	1962		Bathore Sports Hall	500	(Albania) Adem Muhametaj
Partizani	Tirana	1946		Asllan Rusi Sports Palace	3,000	(Albania) E.Ismeti
Teuta	Durrës	1925		Ramazan Njala Sports Palace	1,000	(Montenegro) Miodrag Baletic
Tirana	Tirana	1946		Farie Hoti Sports Palace	3,000	(Albania) Bujar Shehu
Vllaznia	Shkodër	1919		Qazim Dërvishi Sports Palace	1,200	(Albania) Bledar Gjeçaj

== Regular season ==
=== League table ===
Pos	Team	Pld	W	L	PF	PA	PD	Pts	Qualification or relegation
1	Goga	20	18	2	1856	1565	+291	38	Qualification to playoffs
2	Teuta	20	15	5	1757	1488	+269	35	Qualification to playoffs
3	Partizani	20	10	10	1639	1536	+103	30	Qualification to playoffs
4	Tirana	20	8	12	1568	1656	−88	28	Qualification to playoffs
5	Vllaznia	20	5	15	1569	1811	−242	25	Relegation playoffs
6	Kamza (R)	20	4	16	1531	1855	−324	24	Relegation to First Division

Source: FSHB
(R) Relegated

=== Results ===
Home \ Away	GOG	KAM	PAR	TEU	TIR	VLL	GOG	KAM	PAR	TEU	TIR	VLL
Goga	—	117–90	102–89	80–76	102–75	131–86	—	104–93	84–71	87–81	84–71	107–77
Kamza	73–82	—	58–100	78–116	86–82	85–80	75–92	—	46–94	85–100	82–95	108–92
Partizani	68–74	85–66	—	65–62	75–53	82–75	79–90	93–84	—	79–92	63–66	86–89
Teuta	90–80	111–76	74–78	—	95–66	101–46	71–83	81–70	85–81	—	75–74	99–77
Tirana	87–83	76–74	92–83	69–98	—	113–79	75–98	89–59	80–91	70–83	—	97–86
Vllaznia	62–87	70–75	74–96	56–78	78–70	—	76–90	105–69	91–80	88–89	82–68	—

Source: FSHB
Legend: Blue = home team win; Red = away team win.

== Playoffs ==
The semi-finals were played in a best-of-three playoff format and the finals in a best-of-five playoff format (1-1-1-1-1).

=== Bracket ===
Semi-finals
Goga	2
Tirana	1
Teuta	2
Partizani	0

Finals
Goga	3
Teuta	2

=== Semi-finals ===
Team 1	Series	Team 2	Game 1	Game 2	Game 3
Goga	2–1	Tirana	81–74	75–82	100–65
Teuta	2–0	Partizani	83–60	69–63	

=== Finals ===
Team 1	Series	Team 2	Game 1	Game 2	Game 3	Game 4	Game 5
Goga	3–2	Teuta	84–88	73–72	79–70	70–81	81–60

== Relegation playoffs ==
Vllaznia played legs 1 and 3 at home.

Team 1	Series	Team 2	Game 1	Game 2	Game 3
Vllaznia	2–0	Invaders	91–56	107–75	

== Albanian clubs in European competitions ==
Team	Competition	Progress
Teuta	Balkan League	Runner-up
