= 2019–20 Albanian Basketball Superleague =

Albanian Basketball Superleague
- Season: 2019–20
- Duration: 4 October 2019 – May 2020
- TV partners: Telesport; TVSH

The 2019–20 Albanian Basketball Superleague, is the 54th season of the top professional basketball league in Albania.

== Competition format ==
The six clubs played a four-legged round robin tournament where the four first qualified teams would advance to the playoffs.

The fifth qualified team faced the runner-up of the second division in a best-of-three games playoff for avoiding relegation, and the last qualified team was directly relegated.

== Clubs and arenas ==
Locations of the 2019–20 Albanian Superliga teams

Club	Location	Founded	Colours	Arena	Capacity	Head coach
Barleti Eagles	Tirana					
Goga	Durrës			Ramazan Njala Sports Palace	1,000	
Partizani	Tirana	1946		Asllan Rusi Sports Palace	3,000	(Albania) E.Ismeti
Teuta	Durrës	1925		Ramazan Njala Sports Palace	1,000	(Montenegro) Miodrag Baletic
Tirana	Tirana	1946		Farie Hoti Sports Palace	3,000	(Albania) Bujar Shehu
Vllaznia	Shkodër	1919		Qazim Dërvishi Sports Palace	1,200	(Albania) Bledar Gjeçaj

== Regular season ==
=== League table ===
Pos	Team	Pld	W	L	PF	PA	PD	Pts	Qualification or relegation
1	Teuta	11	9	2	954	874	+80	20	Qualification to playoffs
2	Goga	11	8	3	1064	902	+162	19	Qualification to playoffs and Liga Unike
3	Vllaznia	11	7	4	906	786	+120	18	Qualification to playoffs and Liga Unike
4	Partizani	11	6	5	937	863	+74	17	Qualification to playoffs
5	Tirana	12	4	8	933	975	−42	16	Qualification to the relegation playoffs and Liga Unike
6	Barleti Eagles	12	0	12	806	1200	−394	12	Relegation to First Division

Updated to match(es) played on 8 March 2020. Source: FSHB

=== Results ===
Home \ Away	BAR	GOG	PAR	TEU	TIR	VLL	BAR	GOG	PAR	TEU	TIR	VLL
Barleti Eagles	—	73–105	63–78	76–103	52–92	64–92	—	64–127	78–99			
Goga	105–60	—	107–98	97–98	95–92	81–68		—			82–69	
Partizani	111–70	91–83	—	76–78	80–84	69–76			—			
Teuta	101–66	111–100	64–69	—	96–86	75–69			89–81	—		
Tirana	99–77	78–82	69–78	58–81	—	51–84				79–72	—	
Vllaznia	80–64	91–73	71–85	83–87	78–77	—	109–65				96–68	—

Updated to match(es) played on 8 March 2020. Source: FSHB
Legend: Blue = home team win; Red = away team win.

== Playoffs ==
The semi-finals were played in a best-of-three playoff format and the finals in a best-of-five playoff format (1-1-1-1-1).

=== Bracket ===
Semi-finals

Finals

=== Semi-finals ===
Team 1	Series	Team 2	Game 1	Game 2	Game 3

=== Finals ===
Team 1	Series	Team 2	Game 1	Game 2	Game 3	Game 4	Game 5

== Relegation playoffs ==
Team from the ABL plays legs 1 and 3 at home.

Team 1	Series	Team 2	Game 1	Game 2	Game 3
