= 2024–25 Liga Unike =

Albania and Kosovo pro basketball league

Liga Unike
- Season: 2024–25
- TV partner(s): Artmotion, Kujtesa and RTSH

Finals
- Champions: Vëllaznimi (1st title)
- Runners-up: Prishtina
- Finals MVP: Arian Azemi (Vëllaznimi)

Seasons
- ← 2023–24 2025–26 →

The 2024–25 Liga Unike was the fifth season of the Liga Unike, a professional basketball league in Albania and Kosovo. It started on the 4 December 2024 and ended on the 27 March 2025.

== Teams ==
In the 2024–25 Liga Unike, the four best teams of the Albanian Basketball Superleague and Kosovo Basketball Superleague participated. However, Trepça and Peja did not participate. The eight teams were divided in two groups.

Locations of the 2024–25 Liga Unike teams

Note: Table lists in alphabetical order.

Team	Location	Arena and capacity		Founded	Joined	Qualified as
(Albania) Besëlidhja Lezhë	Lezhë	Farie Hoti Sports Palace	1,200	1930	2024	Champion of ABSL
(Kosovo) Bashkimi	Prizren	Sezai Surroi	3,000	1945	2024	Sixth place of KBSL
(Kosovo) Prishtina	Pristina	Palace of Youth and Sports	3,000	1970	2020	Fourth place of KBSL
(Albania) Teuta Durrës	Durrës	Ramazan Njala Sports Palace	2,000	1925	2020	Second place of ABSL
(Albania) Tirana	Tirana	Farie Hoti Sports Palace	1,200	1946	2020	Fourth place of ABSL
(Kosovo) Vëllaznimi	Gjakova	Shani Nushi Sports Hall	2,500	1948	2024	Fifth place of KBSL
(Albania) Vllaznia	Shkodër	Qazim Dervishi Sports Palace	1,200	1946	2020	Third place of ABSL
(Kosovo) Ylli	Suva Reka	13 June Sports Hall	1,800	1975	2020	Third place of KBSL

Notes

- ABSL = Albanian Basketball Superleague
- KBSL = Kosovo Basketball Superleague
