= 2015–16 Albanian Basketball Superleague =

- League: Albanian Basketball Superleague
- Sport: Basketball
- Games: 60 (Regular Season)
- Teams: 6
- TV partner(s): TeleSport; TVSH

Regular Season
- Season champions: Kamza

2016 ABL Playoffs
- Finals champions: Vllaznia
- Runners-up: BC Teuta Durrës

ABL seasons
- ← 2014–15 2016–17 →

The 2015–16 Albanian Basketball Superleague, is the 50th season of the top professional basketball league in Albania. The regular season started on 2 October 2015 and the defending champions were Vllaznia. The finals were contested between BC Teuta Durrës and the holders Vllaznia, with Vllaznia retaining their title on 1 June 2016.

== Clubs and Arenas ==
Locations of the 2015–16 Albanian Superliga teams

Club	Location	Founded	Arena	Capacity	Head coach
Flamurtari	Vlorë	1924	Vlorë Sports Palace	1,000	(Albania) Vladimir Birçe
Kamza	Kamëz	1962	Bathore Sports Hall	500	(Albania) Adem Muhametaj
Partizani	Tirana	1946	Asllan Rusi Sports Palace	3,000	(Albania) E.Ismeti
BC Teuta Durrës	Durrës	1925	Ramazan Njala Sports Palace	2,000	(Albania) Artan Kalaja
Tirana	Tirana	1946	Farie Hoti Sports Palace	3,000	(Albania) Bujar Shehu
Vllaznia	Shkodër	1919	Qazim Dërvishi Sports Palace	1,200	(Albania) Bledar Gjeçaj

== Regular season ==
=== League table ===
Pos	Team	Pld	W	L	PF	PA	PD	Pts	Qualification or relegation
1	Kamza	20	18	2	1457	1197	+260	38	Playoffs
2	Vllaznia	20	16	4	1445	1229	+216	36	Playoffs
3	Tirana	20	13	7	1792	1346	+446	33	Playoffs
4	BC Teuta Durrës	20	9	11	1485	1428	+57	29	Playoffs
5	Flamurtari	20	3	17	1187	1606	−419	23	Relegation playoffs
6	Partizani	20	1	19	1225	1578	−353	21	Relegated

Source: Eurobasket

== Playoffs ==
Semi-finals
1	Kamza	74	64
4	BC Teuta Durrës	80	68
2	Vllaznia	81	80
3	Tirana	63	68

Finals
2	Vllaznia	64	76	84	102
4	BC Teuta Durrës	60	89	46	76

Relegation playoffs
5	Flamurtari	72	63	76
6	Partizani	64	70	67

Source: Albaniansport

== Statistics ==
- Longest winning streak: 13 games (Kamza)
- Longest losing streak: 15 games (Partizani)
- Highest scoring game: Tirana 133–68 Flamurtari (16 April 2016)
- Biggest home win: Tirana 133–68 Flamurtari (16 April 2016)
- Biggest away win: Partizani 50–101 Tirana (27 March 2016)
- Most wins: 18 (Kamza)
- Fewest wins: 1 (Partizani)
- Most points: 1945 (Vllaznia)
- Fewest points: 1225 (Partizani)
