= 2016–17 Albanian Basketball Superleague =

Albanian Basketball Superleague
- Season: 2016–17
- Games played: 60 (Regular season)
- Teams: 6
- TV partners: Telesport; TVSH

Finals
- Champions: Tirana
- Runners-up: Vllaznia

The 2016–17 Albanian Basketball Superleague, was the 51st season of the top professional basketball league in Albania.

Finally, Tirana conquered its 19th title, the first one since 2012.

== Clubs and arenas ==
Locations of the 2016–17 Albanian Superliga teams

Club	Location	Founded	Colours	Arena	Capacity	Head coach
Ardhmëria	Tirana	2006		Asllan Rusi Sports Palace	3,000	(Albania) Afrim Bilali
Flamurtari	Vlorë	1924		Vlorë Sports Palace	1,000	(Albania) Vladimir Birçe
Kamza	Kamëz	1962		Bathore Sports Hall	500	(Albania) Adem Muhametaj
Teuta	Durrës	1925		Ramazan Njala Sports Palace	1,000	(Albania) Artan Kalaja
Tirana	Tirana	1946		Farie Hoti Sports Palace	3,000	(Albania) Bujar Shehu
Vllaznia	Shkodër	1919		Qazim Dërvishi Sports Palace	1,200	(Albania) Bledar Gjeçaj

== Overview ==
In the last round of the regular season, leader Tirana beat Flamurtari, that lost all their matches, by 207–42 establishing a new record in the Albanian league.

== Regular season ==
=== League table ===
Pos	Team	Pld	W	L	PF	PA	PD	Pts	Qualification or relegation
1	Tirana	19	17	2	1944	1241	+703	36	Playoffs
2	Vllaznia	19	14	5	1524	1305	+219	33	Playoffs
3	Teuta	19	12	7	1446	1316	+130	31	Playoffs
4	Kamza	19	9	10	1425	1504	−79	28	Playoffs
5	Ardhmëria	19	5	14	1308	1321	−13	24	Relegation playoffs
6	Flamurtari	19	0	19	935	1895	−960	19	Relegation

Source: EuroBasket

== Playoffs ==
In the finals, the seeded team played games 1, 3 and 5 (finally not necessary) at home.

Semi-finals
Tirana	127	118
Kamza	90	79
Vllaznia	93	87
Teuta	56	62

Final
Tirana	98	90	87
Vllaznia	71	87	80
