= Orion Garo =

Albanian basketball player

Personal information
- Born: 30 March 1980 (age 46) Durrës, Albania
- Listed height: 2.07 m (6 ft 9 in)

Career information
- College: St. Bonaventure Bonnies (2000–2002); Dakota State Trojans (2003–2004)
- Playing career: 1995–2013

Career history
- 1995–1996: Teuta
- 1996–1998: Partizani Tirana
- 1998–2000: Petriloli
- 2004–2005: Partizani Tirana
- 2005–2006: ENAD
- 2006: Tirana
- 2006: Aalborg Vikings
- 2007–2012: Tirana
- 2012–2013: Teuta

Career highlights
- As player: 5× Albanian League champion (2008–2012); 4x Albanian Cup winner (2008, 2009, 2011, 2012); 5x Albanian Supercup winner (2008–2012)

Orion Garo (born 30 March 1980) is an Albanian basketball former basketball player.

== Career ==
He made his debut in the Albanian League at a very young age, playing one season at Teuta and two at Partizani Tirana. From 1998 to 2000 he played for the Italian Petritoli Basket before embarking on a journey in the NCAA with St. Bonaventure Bonnies and Dakota State Trojans.

In 2004 he returned to Partizani Tirana. He later played for ENAD and Aalborg Vikings. From 2007 until 2012 he played for Tirana. Garo ended his career in 2013 at his hometown club Teuta.
