= Gerti Shima =

Albanian basketball player (born 1986)

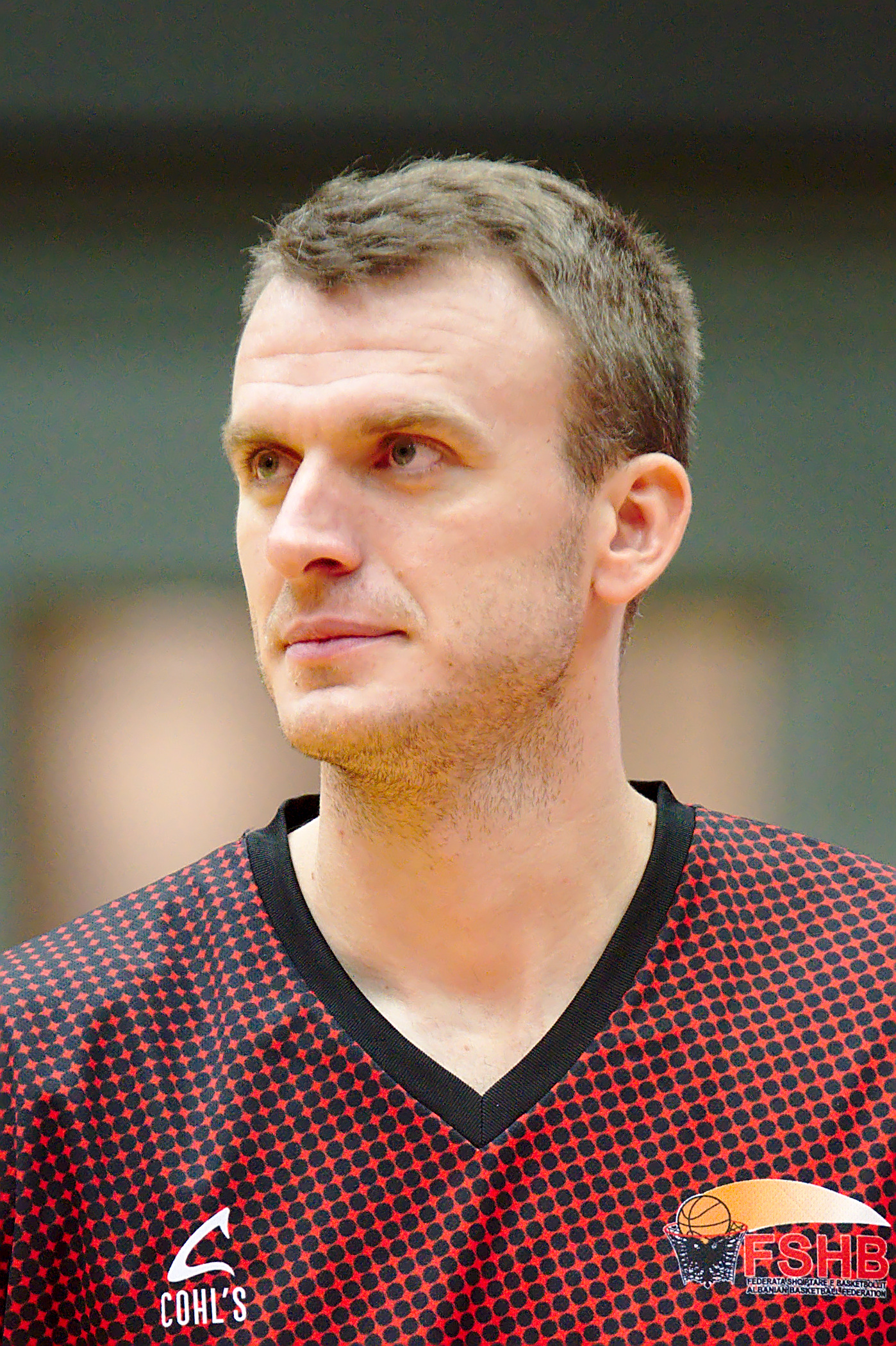
- Shima with the Albanian national basketball team

Personal information
- Born: May 6, 1986 (age 40) Tirana, Albania
- Listed height: 6 ft 8 in (2.03 m)
- Listed weight: 225 lb (102 kg)

Career information
- Playing career: 2001–2021
- Position: Power forward

Career history
- 2001–2002: Tirana
- 2004–2006: Valbona
- 2006–2008: Sigal Prishtina
- 2008–2011: Tirana
- 2011–2012: Čapljina Lasta
- 2012–2015: Peja
- 2015-2016: Bashkimi
- 2016: Sigal Prishtina
- 2017–2021: Tirana

Career highlights
- 9x Albanian League champion (2003, 2005, 2006, 2008–2011, 2017, 2018); 8x Albanian Cup winner (2002 , 2005, 2006, 2009–2011, 2017); 7x Albanian Supercup winner (2005, 2006, 2008, 2009, 2010, 2011, 2017); 2× Kosovo Superleague champion (2013, 2016); Kosovo Cup winner (2016); Balkan League champion (2016)

Gerti Shima (born 9 May 1986 in Tirana) Secretary General of NOC Albania from 2021, an Albanian former professional basketball player who last played for Albanian side KB Tirana in the Albanian Basketball Superliga. Shima transferred for the second time to Sigal Prishtina in January 2016. He made a big comeback to his hometown club, where he has been playing professionally since he was 15 years old, KB Tirana on 3 November 2016. He retired from basketball in September 2021, after he was elected in position of Secretary General in Albania National Olympic Committee. In 2006 he scored 91 points in a game with Valbona against Partizani, a league record that stood for ten years until Genti Lasku scored 100.

== Career ==
Shima returned to Kosovo in September 2012 after securing a transfer to KB Peja, signing a one-year contract.

On 10 August 2015, Shima signed one-year contract for KB Bashkimi., but on 8 January 2016 he left KB Bashkimi.

On 11 January 2016, he signed one-year contract for Sigal Prishtina. On 3 November 2016, he made a come back to KB Tirana. Shima played from 2001 in the national team where he was the captain of Albania national team.

Since September 2021 he is in the position of Secretary General at Albania Olympic Committee
