= Robert Shestani =

Albanian basketball player (born 1993)

Vllaznia
- Position: Point guard

Personal information
- Born: 14 September 1993 (age 33) Shkodër, Albania
- Listed height: 1.87 m (6 ft 2 in)

Career information
- NBA draft: 2015: undrafted
- Playing career: 2010–present

Career history
- 2010–2015: Vllaznia
- 2015–2016: Kamza
- 2016–2017: Tirana
- 2017–2018: Goga Basket
- 2018–2019: Teuta
- 2019–2022: Vllaznia
- 2020–2021: →Vëllaznimi
- 2022–2023: Deçiq
- 2023–2024: Besëlidhja
- 2024–present: Vllaznia

Career highlights
- As player: 5× Albanian League champion (2013, 2014, 2018, 2019, 2024); 2x Albanian Cup winner (2018, 2019); 2x Albanian Supercup winner (2015, 2019)

Robert Shestani (born 14 September 1993) is an Albanian basketball player. He was part of the Albanian national team from 2016 until 2021.

== Career ==
=== Vëllaznimi (2020–2021) ===
On December 2, 2020, he signed for the Kosovan club Vëllaznimi.

=== Deçiq (2022–2023) ===
On July 23, 2022, Shestani signed for Deçiq of the Prva A Liga.

=== Vllaznia (2024–present) ===
On September 4, 2024, he returned to his hometown club Vllaznia.
