= 2023–24 Liga Unike =

Albania and Kosovo pro basketball league

Liga Unike
- Season: 2023–24
- TV partner(s): Artmotion, Kujtesa and RTSH

Finals
- Champions: Trepça (1st title)
- Runners-up: Golden Eagle Ylli
- Finals MVP: Darnell Edge (Trepça)

Seasons
- ← 2022–23 2024–25 →

The 2023–24 Liga Unike, also known as Liga Unike Lajthiza for sponsorship reasons, was the fourth season of the Liga Unike, a professional basketball league in Albania and Kosovo. It started on 27 March 2024 and ended on 31 March 2024.

== Teams ==
Locations of the 2023–24 Liga Unike teams

Note: Table lists in alphabetical order.

| Team | Location | Arena and capacity | | Founded | Joined | Qualified as |
|---|---|---|---|---|---|---|
| (Albania) Besëlidhja Lezhë | Lezhë | Farie Hoti Sports Palace | 1,200 | 1930 | 2024 | Runner-up of ABSL |
| (Albania) Kamza | Kamez | Bathore Sports Hall | 400 | 1962 | 2022 | Fourth place of ABSL |
| (Kosovo) Peja | Peja | Karagaq Sports Hall | 2,500 | 1993 | 2020 | Champion of KBSL |
| (Kosovo) Prishtina | Pristina | Palace of Youth and Sports | 3,000 | 1970 | 2020 | First place of KBSL |
| (Albania) Teuta Durrës | Durrës | Ramazan Njala Sports Palace | 2,000 | 1925 | 2020 | Third place of ABSL |
| (Albania) Tirana | Tirana | Farie Hoti Sports Palace | 1,200 | 1946 | 2020 | Champion of ABSL |
| (Kosovo) Trepça | Mitrovica | Minatori Sports Hall | 3,500 | 1947 | 2023 | Runner-up of KBSL |
| (Kosovo) Ylli | Suva Reka | 13 June Sports Hall | 1,800 | 1975 | 2020 | Third place of KBSL |

Notes

- ABSL = Albanian Basketball Superleague
- KBSL = Kosovo Basketball Superleague

== Games ==
The competition was organized as Final 8 in Vlorë where the four best teams from the Kosovo Superleague and the four best team from the Albanian Superleague competed for the title.

Quarter-finals
27 March
(Albania) Kamza | 46
(Kosovo) Trepça | 90
27 March
(Kosovo) Golden Eagle Ylli | 92
(Albania) Tirana | 56
27 March
(Kosovo) Prishtina | 80
(Albania) Besëlidhja | 79
27 March
(Kosovo) Peja | 122
(Albania) Teuta | 78

Semi-finals
29 March
(Kosovo) Trepça | 83
(Kosovo) Prishtina | 80
29 March
(Kosovo) Peja | 62
(Kosovo) Ylli | 91

Finals
31 March
(Kosovo) Trepça | 67
(Kosovo) Golden Eagle Ylli | 66
Third place
31 March
(Kosovo) Peja | 20
(Kosovo) Prishtina | 0

== Statistics ==
=== Individual game highs ===
| Category | Player | Team | Statistic |
|---|---|---|---|
| Points | (United States) Alonzo Verge Jr. | (Kosovo) Golden Eagle Ylli | 34 |
| Rebounds | (Albania) Julian Hamati | (Albania) Besëlidhja | 17 |
| Assists | (United States) Alonzo Verge Jr. | (Kosovo) Golden Eagle Ylli | 9 |
| Steals | (United States) Alonzo Verge Jr. | (Kosovo) Golden Eagle Ylli | 5 |
| Blocks | (United States) Devonte Upson (United States) Diamond Stone | (Kosovo) Trepça (Kosovo) Prishtina | 3 |
