= 2022–23 Liga Unike =

Liga Unike
- Season: 2022–23
- TV partner(s): Artmotion, Kujtesa and RTSH

Records
- Biggest home win: Prizreni 85–75 Trepça (24 November 2022)
- Biggest away win: Peja 98–74 Kamza (16 November 2022)

Seasons
- ← 2021–22 2023–24 →

The 2022–23 Liga Unike was the third season of the Liga Unike, a professional basketball league in Albania and Kosovo. It started on 10 November 2022, but was cancelled later due to the withdrawal of Tirana and Teuta.

== Teams ==
=== Venues and locations ===
Locations of the 2022–23 Liga Unike teams

Note: Table lists in alphabetical order.

Team	Town	Arena and capacity	
(Albania) Apolonia Fier	Fier	Flamurtari Sports Palace	2,040
(Albania) Kamza	Kamëz	Bathore Sports Hall	500
(Kosovo) Peja	Peja	Karagaq Sports Hall	2,500
(Kosovo) Prizreni-16	Prizren	Sezai Surroi Sports Hall	3,200
(Albania) Teuta Durrës	Durrës	Ramazan Njala Sports Palace	2,000
(Albania) Tirana	Tirana	Farie Hoti Sports Palace	1,200
(Kosovo) Trepça	Mitrovicë	Salla e sporteve Minatori	3,000
(Kosovo) Ylli	Suva Reka	13 June Sports Hall	1,800
