= Afrim Bilali =

Albanian basketball player and coach (born 1979)

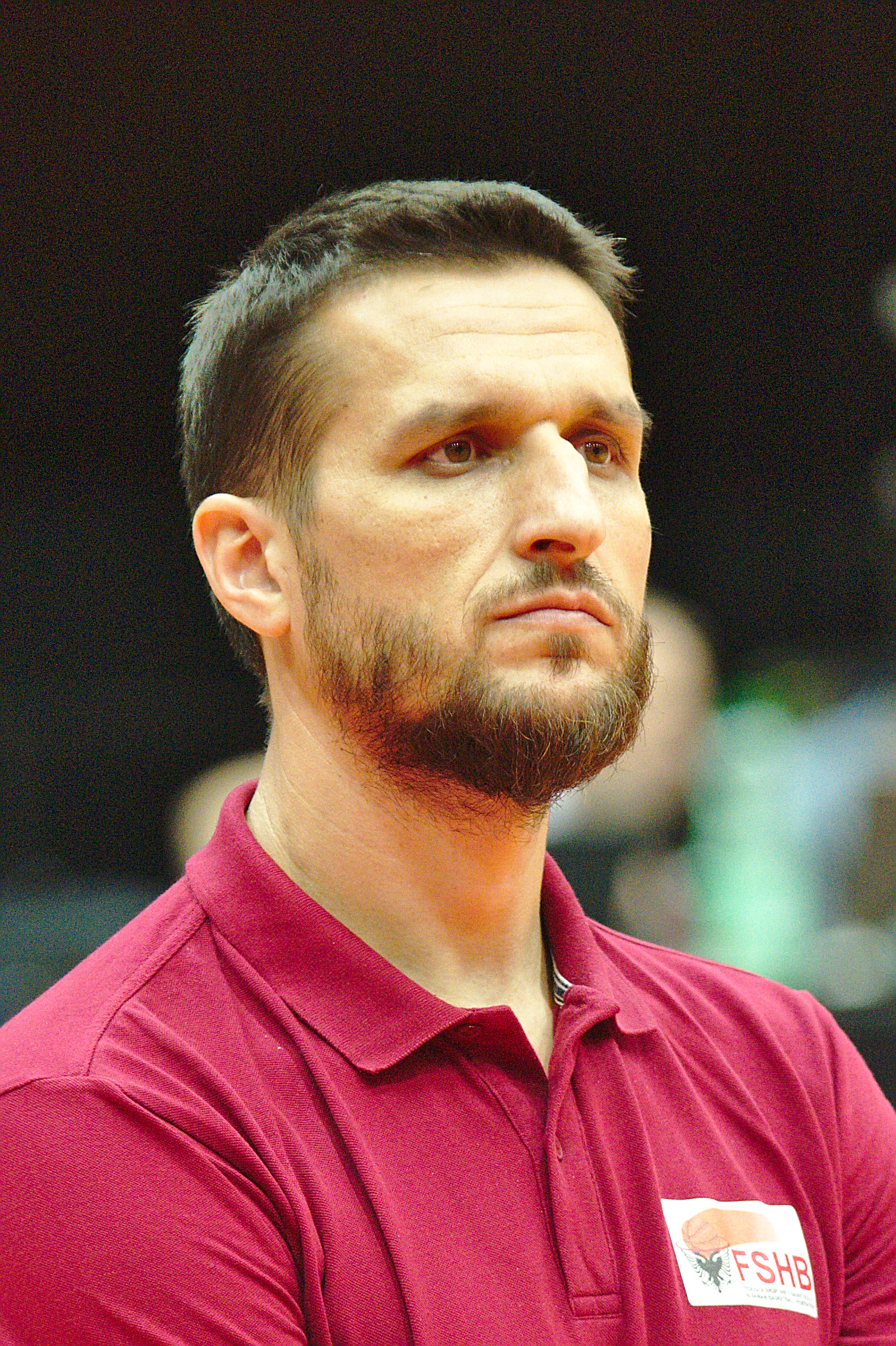

Besëlidhja
- League: Albanian Superleague; Liga Unike

Personal information
- Born: September 8, 1979 (age 47) Shkodër, Albania
- Listed height: 6 ft 5 in (1.96 m)

Career information
- Playing career: 1998–2014
- Coaching career: 2015–present

Career history
- 1998–1999: Vllaznia
- 1999–2000: Dinamo Tirana
- 2000–2002: Univerziteti Prishtina
- 2002–2014: Valbona/Kamza

Career highlights
- As a player: 6× Albanian Basketball League (2003–2007, 2013); 5× Albanian Cup (2003–2006, 2013); 2× Albanian Supercup (2013, 2014)

Afrim Bilali (born 8 September 1979) is an Albanian former professional basketball player and coach for Besëlidhja. He was a member of the Albania national basketball team between 2002 and 2013. His top score is 55 points 14 rebounds and 7 assist. He also has 5 MVP trophies. He dropped a 30 point triple double against England on a friendly match.

== Coaching career ==
=== Besëlidhja ===
On the 4 November 2022, Afrim Bilali became the head coach of Besëlidhja.
