= Julian Hamati =

Albanian basketball player

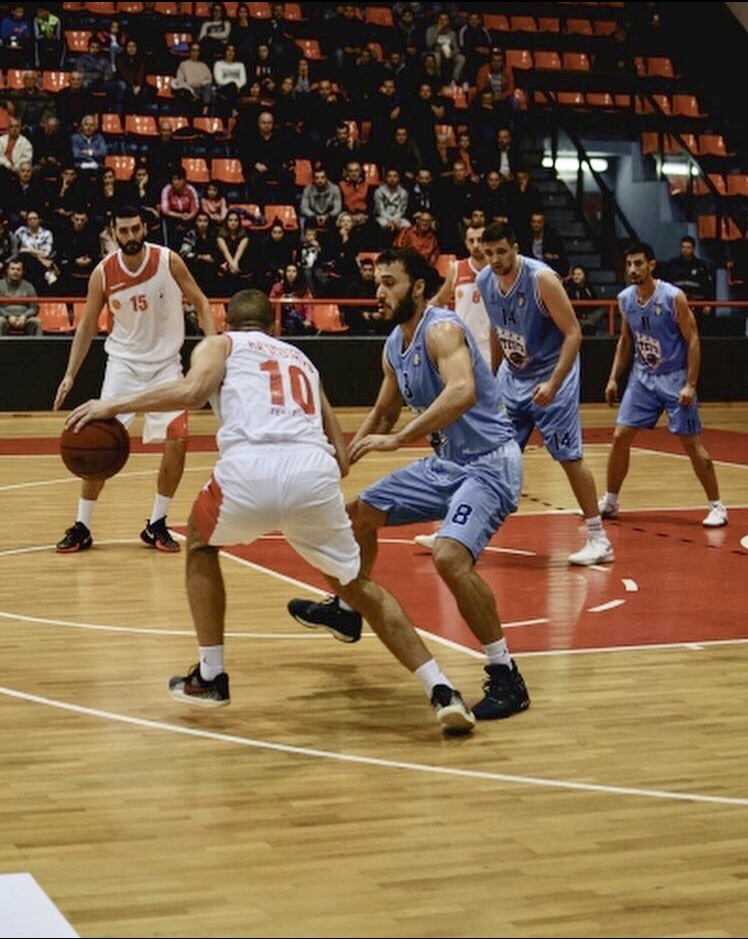
- Julian Hamati for Teuta Durrës

No. 8 – Besëlidhja
- Position: Power forward
- League: Albanian Basketball League; Liga Unike

Personal information
- Born: November 16, 1992 (age 33) Pogradec, Albania
- Listed height: 198 cm (6 ft 6 in)
- Listed weight: 97 kg (214 lb)

Career information
- Playing career: 2012–present

Career history
- 2012–2014: Partizani
- 2014–2018: Kamza
- 2018–2020: Teuta Durrës
- 2020: Vllaznia
- 2020–2021: Bashkimi
- 2021–2023: Tirana
- 2023–present: Besëlidhja

Career highlights
- Albanian League Finals MVP (2024); Albanian League (2024); Albanian League Finals MVP (2023); Albanian Basketball Cup (2016)

Julian Hamati (born 16 November 1992) is an Albanian professional basketball player who currently plays for Besëlidhja in the Albanian Basketball League.

Hamati started his career in 2012 and has since been a part of the Albanian Basketball League. In 2018, following his transfer to Teuta he was also a part of the Balkan International Basketball League.

== Career ==
=== Besëlidhja ===
In 2023, Hamati signed for Besëlidhja of the Albanian Superleague and the Liga Unike. With Besëlidhja, he won the league title in 2024.

== Balkan League statistics ==
Year	Team	GP	GS	MPG	FG%	3P%	FT%	RPG	APG	SPG	BPG	PPG	PIR
2018–19	BC Teuta Durrës	14	1	13.86	.455	.000	.667	3.71	0.86	0.57	0.29	5.14	6.43
