= Erkand Karaj =

Albanian basketball player (born 1982)

Tirana
- League: Albanian Basketball League

Personal information
- Born: May 3, 1982 (age 44) Tirana, Albania
- Listed height: 6 ft 2 in (1.88 m)
- Listed weight: 195 lb (88 kg)

Career information
- Playing career: 1998–2018
- Coaching career: 2018–present

Career history

Playing
- 1998-2005: Prishtina
- 2005–2006: Valbona Basket Tropoja
- 2006–2012: Tirana
- 2012–2016: Kamza Basket
- 2016–2018: Tirana

Coaching
- 2018–present: Tirana
- 2023–present: Albania

Career highlights
- 12x Albanian League; 13x Albanian Cup; 14x Albanian Supercup

Erkand Karaj (born 3 May 1982) is a former Albanian professional basketball player and currently the coach of the Albanian national team and KB Tirana in the Albanian Basketball League. He was a member of the Albania national basketball team between 2002 and 2012.

== Coaching career ==
=== Albania ===
On the 24 November 2023, Karaj was appointed as the head coach of the Albanian national team.
