= Nikolin Arra =

Albanian basketball player (born 1991)

Nikollin Arra
Personal information
- Born: 1 June 1991 (age 35) Shkoder, Albania
- Listed height: 6 ft 8 in (2.03 m)
- Listed weight: 242 lb (110 kg)

Career information
- College: UAT
- Playing career: 2010–present
- Position: Power forward
- Number: 22

Career history
- 2010–2011: UAT
- 2011–2012: Kamza Basket
- 2012–2013: Tirana
- 2013–2018: Vllaznia

Career highlights
- Albanian Basketball League (2014); Albanian Basketball Cup (2014)

Nikolin Arra (born 1 June 1991 in Shkoder) is an Albanian former professional basketball player last played for KB Vllaznia in the Albanian Albanian Basketball League.
