= Elian Memçaj =

Albanian basketball player (born 2002)

Teuta
- Position: Shooting guard
- League: Albanian Basketball League; Liga Unike

Personal information
- Born: 6 March 2002 (age 24) Shkodër, Albania
- Listed height: 6 ft 5 in (1.96 m)
- Listed weight: 168 lb (76 kg)

Career information
- Playing career: 2019–present

Career history
- 2019–2020: Teuta
- 2020–2023: Vllaznia
- 2023–present: Teuta

Elian Memçaj (born 6 March 2002) is an Albanian professional basketball player who currently plays for Teuta Durrës in the Albanian Albanian Basketball League. He also represents the Albania national team.
