= Eni Llazani =

Albanian basketball player (born 1989)

Vllaznia
- League: Albanian Basketball League; Liga Unike

Personal information
- Born: November 30, 1989 (age 36) Shkoder, Albania
- Listed height: 6 ft 2 in (1.88 m)
- Listed weight: 180 lb (82 kg)

Career information
- College: UAT
- Playing career: 2008–2020
- Coaching career: 2021–present

Career history
- 2008–2009: UAT
- 2009–2014: Valbona/Kamza
- 2014–2019: Vllaznia
- 2019–2020: Kamza

Coaching
- 2021–2025: Kamza
- 2025–present: Vllaznia

Eni Llazani (born 30 November 1989 in Shkoder) is an Albanian former professional basketball player and coach of Vllaznia in the Albanian Albanian Basketball League.
