= Aaron Pervis Williams =

American basketball player (born 1991)

Aaron Williams
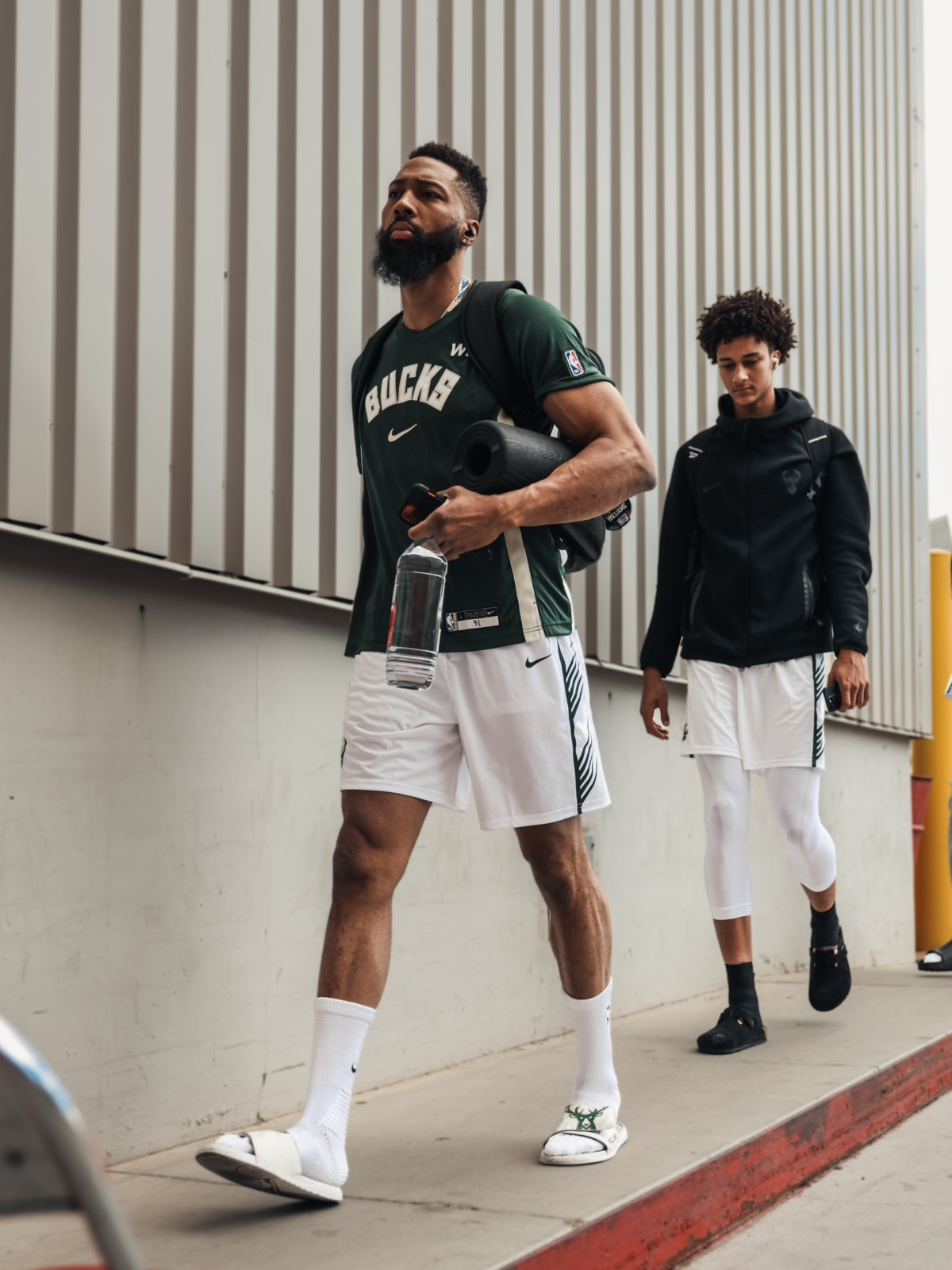
- Aaron Williams and Nate Ament walking into NBA Summer League

No. 31 – Free Agent
- Position: Shooting guard / point guard

Personal information
- Born: November 9, 1991 (age 35) Chicago, Illinois
- Listed height: 6 ft 6 in (1.98 m)
- Listed weight: 205 lb (93 kg)

Career information
- High school: Vocational (Chicago, Illinois)
- College: Dodge City (2010–2011); Chicago State (2011–2015)
- NBA draft: 2015: undrafted
- Playing career: 2015–present

Career history
- 2016–2017: St. Louis Riversharks
- 2017: St. John's Edge
- 2018–2019: Goga Basket
- 2019: Sagesse SC
- 2019: Goga Basket
- 2019–2020: 4th Quarter Helsingborg
- 2020: Djurgårdens IF Basket
- 2021: Cherkaski Mavpy
- 2022: Fryshuset Basket
- 2022–2023: Sangalhos DC
- 2023: Vllaznia
- 2023: Chaophraya Thunder
- 2023: HK Lingnan
- 2024: MBK SPU Nitra

Career highlights
- Great West Conference Champion 2013; MPBA All-MPBA Team (2016); MPBA All Defensive Team (2016); 2019 Albanian Basketball Cup; Ukrainian Basketball Cup Finalist (2021)

Aaron Pervis Williams (born November 9, 1991) is an American professional basketball player that currently plays for MBK SPU Nitra of the Slovak Basketball League. Standing at 1.98 m (6'6), he plays at the guard and forward positions. After one year at Dodge City College and three years at Chicago State University he has played professional basketball in the United States, Albania, Canada, Lebanon, Sweden, Ukraine, Thailand, Hong Kong, Slovakia and Portugal.

== High school career ==
Williams played high school basketball at Chicago Vocational Career Academy at Chicago, Illinois. He was a 2010 McDonalds All-American nominee and also earned all-Chicago Public League Red-South honors as a senior.

== College career ==
After graduating from high school, Williams attended Dodge City Community College, where he stayed until 2011. As a freshman, he averaged 10 points, 7.2 rebounds and 1.2 steals per game which featured 22 points and 10 rebound performance against Garden City Community College. For the next 3 seasons he would attend Chicago State University. As a sophomore, he would have games that featured a 21 points and five rebounds performance against North Carolina A&T, a 15 points and five rebound game against DePaul, and a 19 points and 11 rebounds game vs. Houston Baptist. During his junior year, he would have a 11-point game against Notre Dame. His team would go on to win the great west conference tournament that year. During his senior season, he went on to earn All-WAC Academic Honors.

== Professional career ==
After going undrafted in the 2015 NBA draft, Williams joined the St. Louis Riversharks of the Midwest Professional Basketball Association in 2016. The following season, he was selected as the #1 overall draft pick of the National Basketball League of Canada in 2017 by the St. John's Edge.

The next year, Williams joined Goga Basket of the Albanian Basketball League in 2018. While there, he helped lead his team to the Albanian Cup Finals. That same season, he also played for Sagesse SC of the Lebanese Basketball League.

Williams again signed with Goga Basket in 2019 but soon signed with 4th Quarter Helsingborg in Sweden. While there he went on to average 27.4 points, 10.4 rebounds, 2.4 assists, and 3.0 steals per game. He finished the 2019–2020 season with Djurgården of the Swedish Basketball League. On March 10, 2020, Williams set his career high in points in a Sweden – Basketligan game where he scored 22 points against Norrköping Dolphins. On February 27, 2021, Williams signed with Cherkaski Mavpy of the Ukrainian Basketball SuperLeague.

On July 4, 2026, Williams was named to the Milwaukee Bucks NBA Summer League team in which he participated in the California Classic and the 2026 Las Vegas NBA Summer League.

== Personal life ==
In 2014, Aaron and his mother Tonya gained national attention for earning their bachelor's degree from Chicago State University alongside each other.
