= Endrit Hysenagolli =

Albanian basketball player (born 1988)

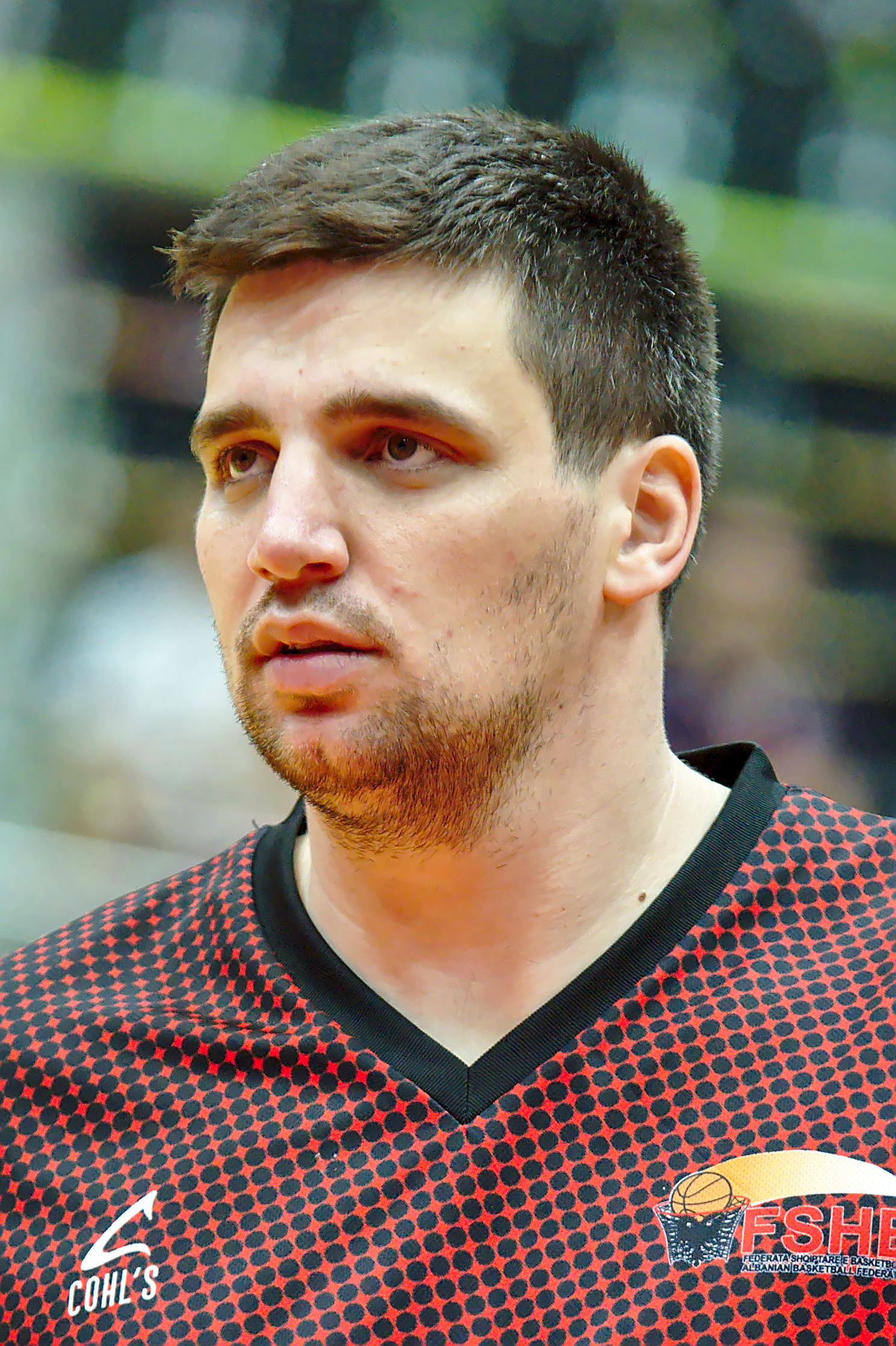

No. 14 – Tirana
- Position: Center
- League: Albanian Basketball Superliga; Liga Unike

Personal information
- Born: July 5, 1988 (age 38) Tiranë, Albania
- Listed height: 6 ft 10.5 in (2.10 m)
- Listed weight: 242 lb (110 kg)

Career information
- Playing career: 2003–present

Career history
- 2003–2006: Studenti Tirana
- 2006–2008: Partizani Tirana
- 2008–2012: Tirana
- 2012–2013: Kamza
- 2013–2014: Peja
- 2014–2016: Bashkimi Prizren
- 2016–2018: Tirana
- 2018–2020: Teuta Durrës
- 2020: Goga Basket
- 2020–2021: Bashkimi Prizren
- 2021: Goga Basket
- 2021–present: Tirana

Endrit Hysenagolli (born 5 July 1988) is an Albanian professional basketball player for the KB Tirana of the Albanian Basketball Superliga. He plays the center position and has been a member of the Albania national team since 2006.

== Achievements ==
2018–19

- Top 5 Balkan League, Top 5 Domestic League
- Best Center Balkan League, Domestic League
