= Bujar Shehu =

Albanian basketball player and coach

Personal information
- Born: 7 February 1939 (age 87) Tirana, Albania
- Listed height: 1.74 m (5 ft 9 in)

Career information
- Playing career: 1960–1966
- Position: Coach
- Coaching career: 1966–2015

Career history

Playing
- 1960–1966: Tirana

Coaching
- 1966–1973: Tirana
- 1975: Albania
- 1978: Albania
- 1988–2002: Tirana
- 1992–1997: Albania
- 2002: Albania
- 2002: Prishtina
- 2002–2004: Peja
- 2005: Drita
- ?: Studenti Tirana
- 2012–2015: Tirana

Career highlights
- As player: 4× Albanian League champion (1961–1963, 1965); 3x Albanian Cup winner (1961–1963); As head coach: 4× Albanian League champion (1971, 1999, 2001, 2002); 9x Albanian Cup winner (1969, 1971, 1973, 1977, 1988, 2000–2002); Albanian Supercup winner (2001)

Bujar Shehu (born 7 February 1939) is an Albanian basketball coach and former basketball player. Shehu coached the Albania national team and teams like Tirana, Prishtina, Peja and Drita. Before starting his coaching career, he played for Tirana and was a member of the Albania national team from 1960 until 1972.
