= Edison Reshketa =

Albanian basketball player (born 1999)

No. 6 – BC Vllaznia
- Title: Shooting guard
- League: Albanian Basketball League

Personal information
- Born: 2 June 1999 (age 27) Shkoder, Albania
- Listed height: 6 ft 3 in (191 cm)
- Listed weight: 187 lb (85 kg)

Career information
- High school: Hasan Riza Pasha College
- Playing career: 2015–present
- Position: Shooting guard
- Number: 6

Career history
- 2015-2017: BC Vllaznia
- 2015: Albania U16 National Team
- 2016: Albania U18 National Team
- 2017: Albania U18 National Team
- 2017 - Present: BC Chilly Mazarin

Edison Reshketa (born 2 June 1999 in Shkoder) is an Albanian basketball player who plays for BC Chilly Mazarin. He previously played for BC Vllaznia as a professional in the Albanian Basketball League, for the Albanian U18 National Basketball Team and also for Albanian U16 National Basketball Team

== Career history ==
Clubs:

2015-2017 : BC Vllaznia

2017–Present : BC Chilly Mazarin

National Team:

2015: Albania U16 National Team

2016: Albania U18 National Team

2017: Albania U18 National Team
