= Mirza Sarajlija =

Slovenian professional basketball player

Hamar
- Position: Point guard
- League: Úrvalsdeild karla

Personal information
- Born: 19 June 1991 (age 35) Ljubljana, SFR Yugoslavia
- Listed height: 1.85 m (6 ft 1 in)
- Listed weight: 77 kg (170 lb)

Career information
- Playing career: 2007–present

Career history
- 2007–2009: Union Olimpija
- 2009–2010: Bosna
- 2010–2012: Mornar
- 2012–2013: LTH Castings Mercator
- 2013: Tamiš
- 2013–2015: Vllaznia Shkodër
- 2015: Kutaisi
- 2015–2016: Ulcinj
- 2016–2017: Šentjur
- 2017–2018: Jazine
- 2018–2019: Rogaška
- 2019: Temp-SUMZ-UGMK
- 2020: Koroivos
- 2020–2021: Stjarnan
- 2021–2022: Fjölnir
- 2022–present: Hamar

Career highlights
- Albanian League champion (2014); Albanian Cup winner (2014); 2× Slovenian League champion (2008, 2009); 2× Slovenian Cup winner (2008, 2009)

Mirza Sarajlija (born 19 June 1991) is a Slovenian professional basketball player who plays for Hamar of the Úrvalsdeild karla.

== Professional career ==
Sarajlija began his career with Union Olimpija as a junior. He made his senior team debut in the 2007–08 season, winning the Slovenian national league and cup that year.

Sarajlija made his Euroleague debut on November 27, 2008, versus Alba Berlin, scoring 13 points and 3 rebounds with only 17 years. He averaged 6.5 points, 1.7 rebounds and 1.2 assists per game in his first season of Euroleague play.

In July 2009, Sarajlija left Olimpija and moved to Krka. However, he did not pass the medical tests for the club and was released.

In September 2009, Sarajlija signed a three-year contract with Bosna. He played there only one season before moving to Mornar from Montenegro.

On November 7, 2012, Sarajlija returned to his homeland and signed with LTH Castings Mercator. In February 2013, he signed with Tamiš from Serbia. He joined KK Šentjur for the 2016–17 season.

In October 2017, he signed with KK Jazine of the Croatian League.

On December 19, 2018, he signed with KK Rogaška.

Season 2019-20 he started in Russian Super League 1 for Temp-SUMZ-UGMK Revda, but left team in December 2019. In 10 games he averaged 9.3ppg, 3.5rpg and 3.6apg. On January 18, 2020, Sarajlija joined Greek 2nd division Koroivos.

In June 2020, Sarajlija signed with Úrvalsdeild karla club Stjarnan. During the regular season, he averaged 14.2 points, 3.4 assists and 4.1 rebounds per game while shooting 36.4% from the three point line. In game 2 of Stjarnan's first round playoff series against Grindavík, Sarajlija suffered a meniscus tear in his right knee, effectively ending his season.

In July 2021, Sarajlija signed with 1. deild karla club Fjölnir.

In 2022, Sarajlija signed with Hamar of the 1. deild karla.

== Club career statistics ==
Legend
GP	Games played	GS	Games started	MPG	Minutes per game
FG%	Field-goal percentage	3P%	3-point field-goal percentage	FT%	Free-throw percentage
RPG	Rebounds per game	APG	Assists per game	SPG	Steals per game
BPG	Blocks per game	PPG	Points per game	PIR	Performance index rating
**Bold**	Career high

=== Euroleague ===
Year	Team	GP	GS	MPG	FG%	3P%	FT%	RPG	APG	SPG	BPG	PPG	PIR
2008–09	Union Olimpija	6	0	19.7	.343	.278	.769	1.7	1.2	1.5	.0	6.5	
