= Redi Vogli =

Albanian basketball player (born 1987)

No. 5 – Tirana
- Position: Shooting guard
- League: Albanian Basketball League; Liga Unike

Personal information
- Born: April 29, 1987 (age 39) Tirana, Albania
- Listed height: 6 ft 2.8 in (1.90 m)

Career information
- Playing career: 2005–present

Career history
- 2005–2010: Tirana
- 2010–2011: Studenti Tirana
- 2011–present: Tirana

Redi Vogli (born 29 April 1987) is an Albanian professional basketball player who plays for KB Tirana in the Albanian Basketball League and Liga Unike. He also played for the Albanian national team.
