= KB Skënderbeu =

- Leagues: Albanian Basketball Superliga; Albanian Cup
- Founded: 1946
- Arena: Tamara Nikolla Sports Palace
- Capacity: 2,400
- Location: Korçë, Albania
- Team colors: Red, White
- Head coach: Ilir Nika
Home	Away

KB Skënderbeu is an Albanian basketball team that plays in the Albanian First Division, the second division in the Albanian Basketball League, and in the Albanian Cup.

== Honours ==
- Albanian First Division (1): 2003

== Notable players ==
- (Albania) Renaldo Kacorri
- (Albania) Ilo Teneqexhi (it)
- (Albania) Bruno Topi
