= Gjon Ndoja =

Albanian basketball player (born 1991)

Personal information
- Born: May 18, 1991 (age 35) Shkodër, Albania
- Listed height: 6 ft 6 in (1.98 m)
- Listed weight: 235 lb (107 kg)

Career information
- Playing career: 2010–2018
- Position: Power forward

Career history
- 2010–2018: Vllaznia

Career highlights
- Albanian Basketball League (2014); Albanian Basketball Cup (2014)

Gjon Zef Ndoja (born 18 May 1991 in Shkoder) is an Albanian professional basketball player who last played for KB Vllaznia in the Albanian Basketball League.
