= KB Besëlidhja =

- Leagues: Albanian Superleague; Liga Unike
- Founded: 1930; 96 years ago
- Location: Lezhë, Albania
- Team colors: Red, Yellow and black
- President: Ylli Ujka
- Head coach: Afrim Bilali
- Championships: 3 National Championships
Home	Away

KB Besëlidhja, also known as Besëlidhja Eagles Basket, is a professional basketball club based in Lezhë, Albania. The club currently plays in the Albanian Basketball Superleague and in the Liga Unike. The club is part of the multidisciplinary Besëlidhja Lezhë.

== History ==
Besëlidhja promoted to the Superleague after 30 years in 2022 after winning against Partizani in the play-out. In the following year, Besëlidhja reached the final of the Superleague but lost against Tirana 3–2. Besëlidhja debuted in Liga Unike on the 28 March 2024 in the quarterfinals against Sigal Prishtina. Despite the dominance of Besëlidhja in the first half, they lost the game close with the result 79–80.

== Honours ==
=== Domestic competitions ===
Albanian League:

- Winner (3): 2023–24,2024–25,2025–26
- Runners-up (1): 2022–23

Albanian Cup :

- Winner (2): 2025,2026
- Runners-up (1): 2024

Albanian Supercup :

- Winner (3): 2024,2025,2026
- Runners-up (1): 2024

=== Regional competitions ===
Liga Unike

- Third place (1): 2024–25

== Notable players ==
- (Albania) Julian Hamati
- (Albania) Eldi Hysa
- (Albania) Marvin Prodani
- (Albania) Robert Shestani
- (United States) Blake Marquardt
- (United States) Philbert Weekes
- (United States) Josh Angle

== See also ==
- KF Besëlidhja Lezhë (football)
