= Nikolin =

Nikolin is a given name and a surname.

== Given name ==
- Nikolin Arra (born 1991), Albanian basketball player
- Nikolin Arra (born 1991), Albanian basketball player

== Surname ==
- Valery Nikolin, Russian sailor
- Zorica Nikolin (born 1961), Serbian chess player
