= Albanian Basketball First Division =

- Organising body: Albanian Basketball League
- Founded: 1946
- First season: 1946
- Country: Albania
- Confederation: FIBA Europe
- Number of teams: 5
- Level on pyramid: 2
- Promotion to: Superliga
- Current champions: Elbasani (1st title) (2024-25)
- President: Avni Ponari
- TV partners: RTSH

The Albanian Basketball First Division is the men's second tier basketball league in Albania. It is the lower division of the Albanian Basketball League which is organised by the Albanian Basketball Federation.

== Current teams (2025–26) ==
Club	Location	Colours	Arena	Capacity
Elbasani	Elbasan		Tomorr Sinani Sports Palace	2,200
Fieri Basket	Fier		Fier Sports Palace	680
Flamurtari	Vlorë		Flamurtari Sports Palace	2,040
Partizani	Tirana		Farie Hoti Sports Palace	1,200
Pogradeci	Pogradec		Pogradec Sports Hall	1,000
Skënderbeu	Korçë		Tamara Nikolla Sports Palace	2,400

== League champions ==
Season	Champion	Runner-up
2003	Skënderbeu	Partizani
2005	Flamurtari	Teuta
2006	Apolonia	Skënderbeu
2010	UAT	Flamurtari
2014	Flamurtari	Partizani
2015	Teuta	UAT
2016	Ardhmëria	Superior
2021	Kamza	Dinamo
2022	Apolonia	Besëlidhja
2023	Flamurtari	Partizani
2025	Elbasani	Partizani

== See also ==
- Albanian Basketball League
- Albanian Basketball Cup
- Albanian Basketball Supercup
