= Dhimitraq Goga Sports Palace =

Basketball arena in Tirana, Albania

Pallati i Sportit Dhimitraq Goga
- Location: Xhafzotaj, Durrës, Albania
- Owner: Goga Basket
- Capacity: 700
- Field size: 115 m × 100 m (377 ft × 328 ft)

Construction
- Opened: 17 September 2017 (hall B); 18 March 2018 (main arena)

Tenant
- Goga Basket

Dhimitraq Goga Sports Palace is a purpose-built basketball arena built in 2018 in Xhafzotaj, Durrës, Albania

== History ==
The arena was built by Goga Basket's owner and locals businessman Perikli Goga on a site in Xhafzotaj owned by Diamant Logistics, also owned by Perikli Goga. The arena is part of the Dhimitraq Goga Sport Centre, which includes 2 basketball courts, 2 outdoor basketball courts and an outdoor tennis court. The 2 indoor courts are made up of the main arena and salla B (hall B), the latter of which was inaugurated on 17 September 2017 in a friendly between Goga Basket women's and ZKK Lovćen which ended 73–45 to Goga Basket.
