= Liga Unike =

- Organising body: Albanian Superleague; Kosovo Superleague
- Founded: 10 September 2020; 5 years ago
- First season: 2020–21
- Country: Albania; Kosovo
- Confederation: FIBA Europe
- Number of teams: 8
- Level on pyramid: 1
- Domestic cup(s): Albanian Cup; Kosovo Cup
- Supercup: Nationwide Supercup
- Current champions: Vëllaznimi (1st title) (2024–25)
- Most championships: Vëllaznimi, Trepça, Peja, Ylli (1 title)
- CEO: Dren Zatriqi
- President: Ilir Trebicka
- TV partners: Artmotion, Kujtesa and RTSH
- Website: https://ligaunike.com/
- 2024–25 Liga Unike

Liga Unike (transl. Unique League) is a professional basketball league in Albania and Kosovo. The first inaugural season commenced on April, 6 2021 and the league was praised from Turgay Demirel, president of FIBA Europe, who was present at the inauguration.

== Teams ==
Top four teams from Kosovo Basketball Superleague and Albanian Basketball Superleague respectively participate in the competition.

=== 2024–25 teams ===
Locations of the 2024–25 Liga Unike teams

Note: Table lists in alphabetical order.

Team	Location	Arena and capacity		Founded	Joined	Qualified as
(Albania) Besëlidhja Lezhë	Lezhë	Farie Hoti Sports Palace	1,200	1930	2024	Champion of ABSL
(Kosovo) Bashkimi	Prizren	Sezai Surroi	3,000	1945	2024	Sixth place of KBSL
(Kosovo) Prishtina	Pristina	Palace of Youth and Sports	3,000	1970	2020	Fourth place of KBSL
(Albania) Teuta Durrës	Durrës	Ramazan Njala Sports Palace	2,000	1925	2020	Second place of ABSL
(Albania) Tirana	Tirana	Farie Hoti Sports Palace	1,200	1946	2020	Fourth place of ABSL
(Kosovo) Vëllaznimi	Gjakova	Shani Nushi Sports Hall	2,500	1948	2024	Fifth place of KBSL
(Albania) Vllaznia	Shkodër	Qazim Dervishi Sports Palace	1,200	1946	2020	Third place of ABSL
(Kosovo) Ylli	Suva Reka	13 June Sports Hall	1,800	1975	2020	Third place of KBSL

Notes

- ABSL = Albanian Basketball Superleague
- KBSL = Kosovo Basketball Superleague

== Liga Unike champions ==
Season		Champions	Runners-up	Third place	Fourth place
1	2020–21	(Kosovo) Ylli	(Kosovo) Peja	(Kosovo) Rahoveci	(Albania) Goga Basket
2	2021–22	(Kosovo) Peja	(Kosovo) Ylli	(Kosovo) Prizreni-16	(Albania) Teuta
3	2022–23	Not held due to withdrawal of two teams			
4	2023–24	(Kosovo) Trepça	(Kosovo) Golden Eagle Ylli	(Kosovo) Peja	(Kosovo) Prishtina
5	2024–25	(Kosovo) Vëllaznimi	(Kosovo) Prishtina	(Albania) Besëlidhja	(Kosovo) Golden Eagle Ylli

== See also ==
- Albanian Basketball Superleague
- Kosovo Basketball Superleague
