= KB Dinamo Tirana =

- Founded: 1950
- History: 1950–present
- Arena: Asllan Rusi Sports Palace
- Capacity: 2,800
- Location: Tirana, Albania
- Team colors: Blue, White
- Championships: 1 Albanian Superliga (1995); 6 Albanian First Division (1974, 1979, 1986, 1991, 1992, 1993, 1999); 2 Albanian Supercup (2000, 2002)
Home	Away

KB Dinamo Tirana is an Albanian basketball team based in the country's capital Tirana, which is the basketball department of multidisciplinary Dinamo Tirana. The club does not currently compete professionally but they have won the Albanian Basketball Superliga in 1995, and they have also won the Albanian Basketball Cup on six occasions between 1974 and 1999.

== Domestic achievements ==
- Albanian Basketball Superliga (1):

1995

- Albanian Basketball Cup (6):

1974, 1979, 1986, 1991, 1992, 1993, 1999

- Albanian Basketball Supercup (2):

2000, 2002
