= American University of Tirana =

Former university in Tirana, Albania

American Higher School of Tirana
- Shkolla e Lartë Amerikane e Tiranës
- Type: Private
- Active: February 27, 2008–August 6, 2014
- President: Lulëzim Ndreu
- Rector: Prof. Dr. Gjergji Minga
- Location: Tirana, Albania
- Campus: Suburban (Lundër, Tiranë)

The American Higher School of Tirana (Albanian: Shkolla e Lartë Amerikane e Tiranës), also incorrectly referred to as "American University of Tirana" (Albanian: "Universiteti Amerikan i Tiranës"), (UAT), is a defunct Higher education institution (HEI) in Tirana, Albania. On 6 August 2014 its licence was permanently revoked by the Albanian Ministry of Education and Sports (MAS), through decision no. 539 of the Albanian Council of Ministers, for not fulfilling the minimum legal requirements of higher education. The Albanian state authorities often compared the closed HEIs to Ponzi schemes, which have caused "extraordinary financial damage" to Albanian students and their parents.

The cessation of the American Higher School of Tirana, also meant the end of the Albanian American Education Group (AAEG). The other two member companies of this group, namely Medicom and the American College of Tirana (Albanian: Kolegji Amerikan i Tiranës) (ACT) are also defunct. Medicom's licence was permanently revoked by the same decision of MAS, on 6 August 2014. ACT, which was a primary and secondary education private school in Tirana, went bankrupt in 2013, after months of not paying its staff.

== See also ==
- List of universities in Albania
