= Tirana Olympic Park =

Arena in Tirana, Albania

- Parku Olimpik i Tiranës
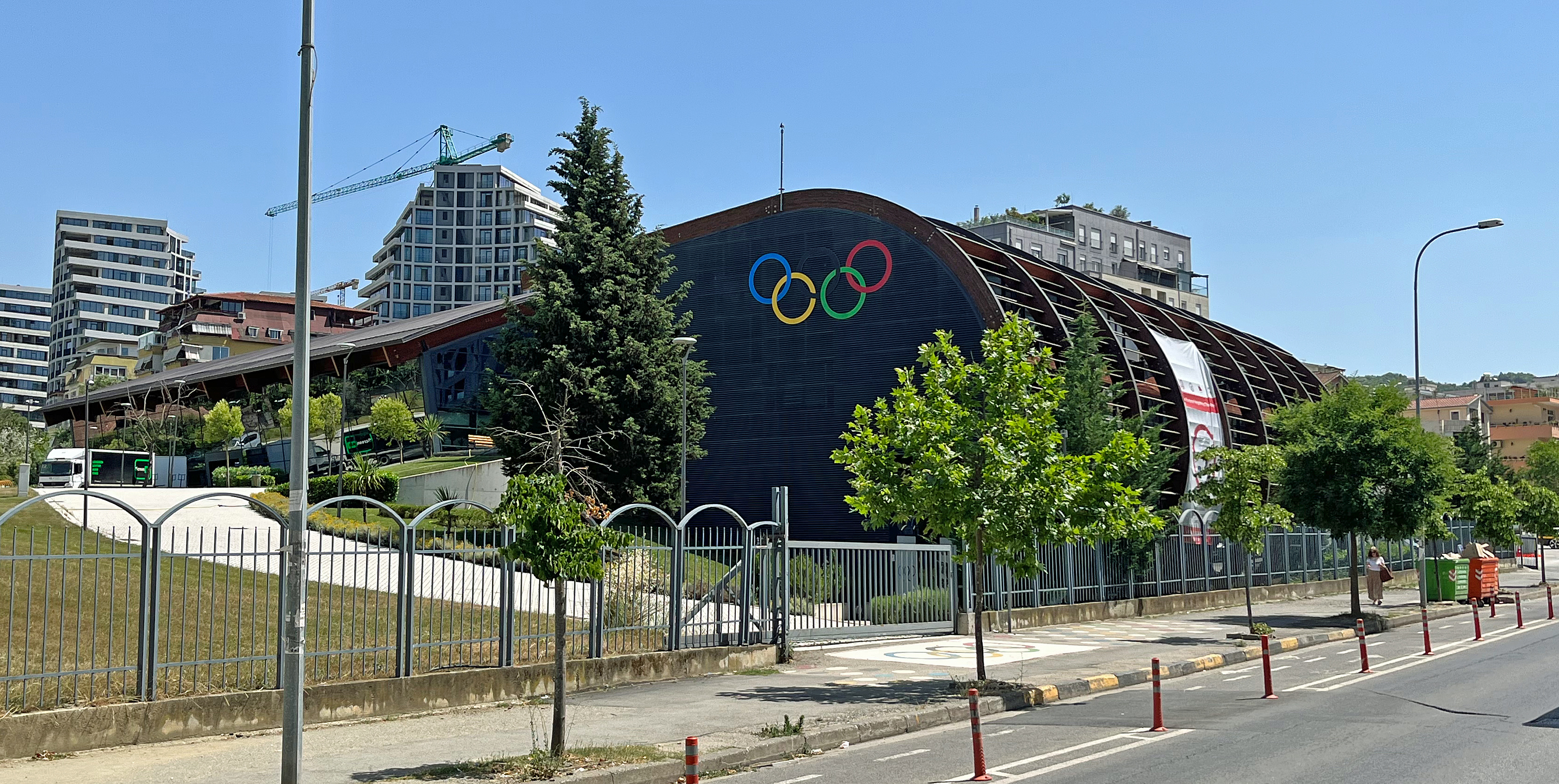
- Interactive map of Tirana Olympic Park
- Location: Tirana, Albania
- Coordinates: 41.314259°N 19.812198°E
- Owner: Ministry of Education and Sport
- Capacity: 1,200

Construction
- Groundbreaking: 2015
- Built: 2016
- Opened: 2017
- Cost: €4,323,302
- Architect: DEA Studios
- Main contractor: Eurocol

The Tirana Olympic Park Feti Borova (Parku Olimpik “Feti Borova”) is a multi-purpose arena in Tirana, Albania. The Government of Albania held a public tender for the construction of a sports hall in order to host games.

The complex was inaugurated the 4 June 2017 with a basketball match between ex-players from the National Teams from Albania and Kosovo. The Prime Minister, Edi Rama and the Mayor of Tirana, Erion Veliaj participated as well in that game.

== Construction ==
The Olympic Park was built on the site of the Sports Complex of the Sports Services Agency, which was formerly known as the Dinamo Complex, near the Grand Park of Tirana. The former Dinamo Complex used to be a reception centre for Kosovar citizens during the Kosovo War of 1999.

The original design for the Olympic Park was released on 28 April 2014, and the Prime Minister, Edi Rama officially unveiled the project at the 'Hall of Maps' in the Prime Ministers Office in a meeting with prominent Albanian sports personalities including Erkand Qerimaj, Daniel Godelli and Luiza Gega. On 10 September 2014 a budget of 605,262,310 Albanian lek was approved, which was around 4,323,302 Euros at the time, thus paving the way for companies to tender offers for the construction of the Olympic Park.

== See also ==
- List of indoor arenas in Albania
