= Xhafzotaj =

- Administrative unit
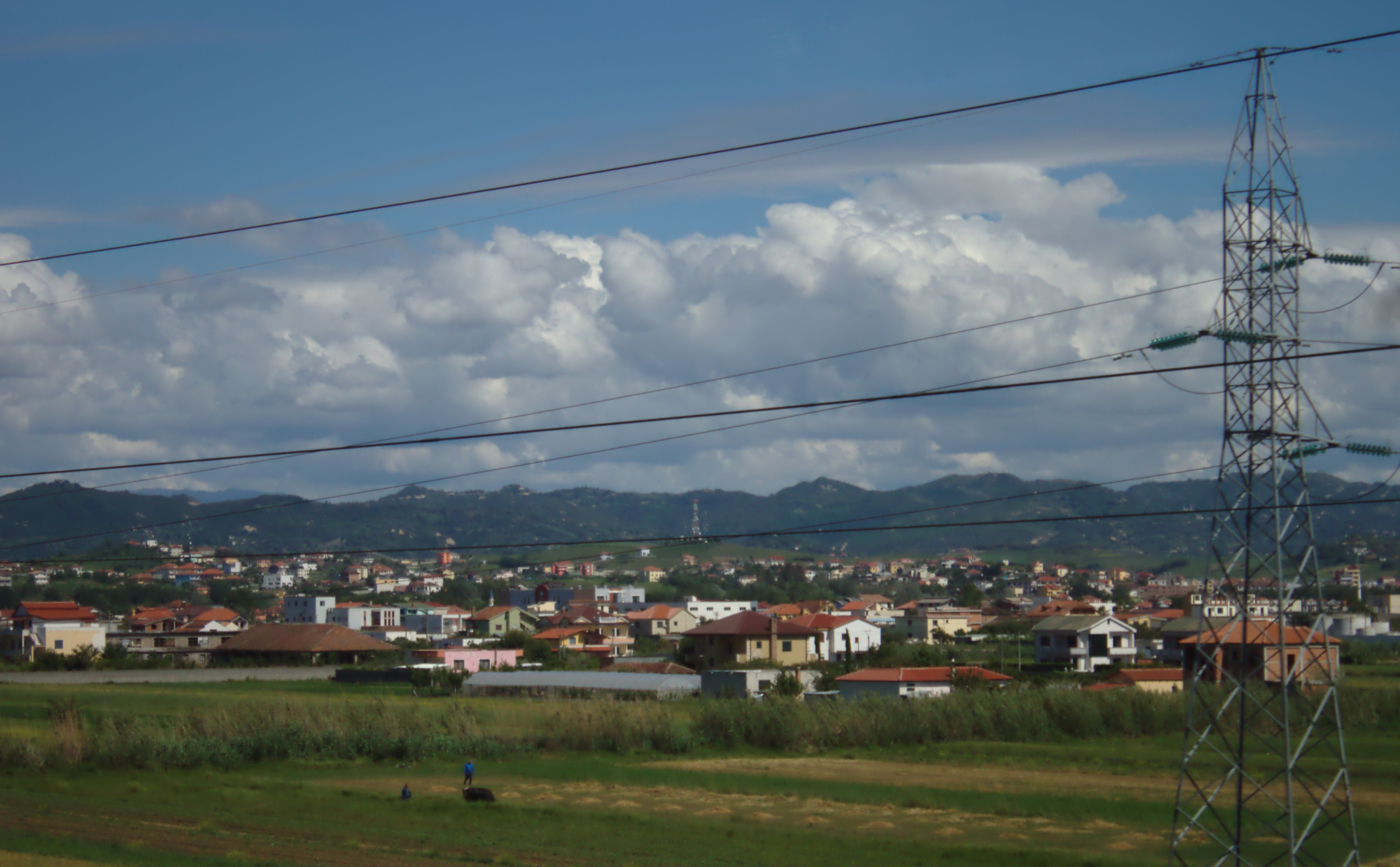
- View of the town from Durrës-Tirana Highway

- Location within Albania
- Coordinates: 41°21′N 19°33′E
- Country: Albania
- County: Durrës
- Municipality: Shijak
  - Administrative unit: 30.84 km^{2} (11.91 sq mi)

Population (2023)
  - Administrative unit: 10,044
  - Administrative unit density: 325.7/km^{2} (843.5/sq mi)
- Time zone: UTC+1 (CET)
  - Summer (DST): UTC+2 (CEST)

Xhafzotaj (IPA: /d͡ʒafzotaj/) is a village and a former municipality in the Durrës County, western Albania. At the 2015 local government reform it became a subdivision of the municipality Shijak. The population at the 2011 census was 10,044.

Historical population
Year	Pop.	±%
1989	10,297	—
2001	9,007	−12.5%
2011	12,381	+37.5%
2023	10,044	−18.9%

The area around Xhafzotaj is very flat. The main road from Durrës to Tirana crossed the municipality while today the road leads mostly along the highway that bypasses the town to the northwest. Once a highly agricultural area, now the region is an important center of industry and trade in the Tirana-Durrës region.
