= Albanian Basketball Supercup =

Albanian Basketball Supercup is an event started only from 1999 and involves the Albanian Basketball League champions and Albanian Basketball Cup winners of the previous season. The Supercup consists in a single match which is always played the year after major events have ended and right before the new season start.

The team with most trophies are Tirana with 9 Supercups.

== Champions ==
Below are the winners of the Albanian Basketball Supercup.

Year	Champion
1999	Vllaznia
2000	Dinamo
2001	Tirana
2002	Dinamo
2003	Tirana
2004	Valbona
2005	Valbona
2006	Valbona
2007	Valbona
2008	Tirana
2009	Tirana
2010	Tirana
2011	Tirana
2012	Tirana
2013	Kamza Basket
2014	Kamza Basket
2015	Kamza Basket
2016	Kamza Basket
2017	Tirana
2018	Teuta
2019	Teuta
2020	-
2021	Teuta
2022	Teuta
2023	Tirana
2024	Besëlidhja
2025	Besëlidhja
2026	Besëlidhja

== Ranking ==
Team	Titles
Tirana	9
Valbona	4
Kamza Basket	4
Teuta	4
Besëlidhja	3
Dinamo	2
Vllaznia	1
