= Asllan Rusi Sports Palace =

Indoor sporting area in Tirana, Albania

- Pallati i Sportit "Asllan Rusi"
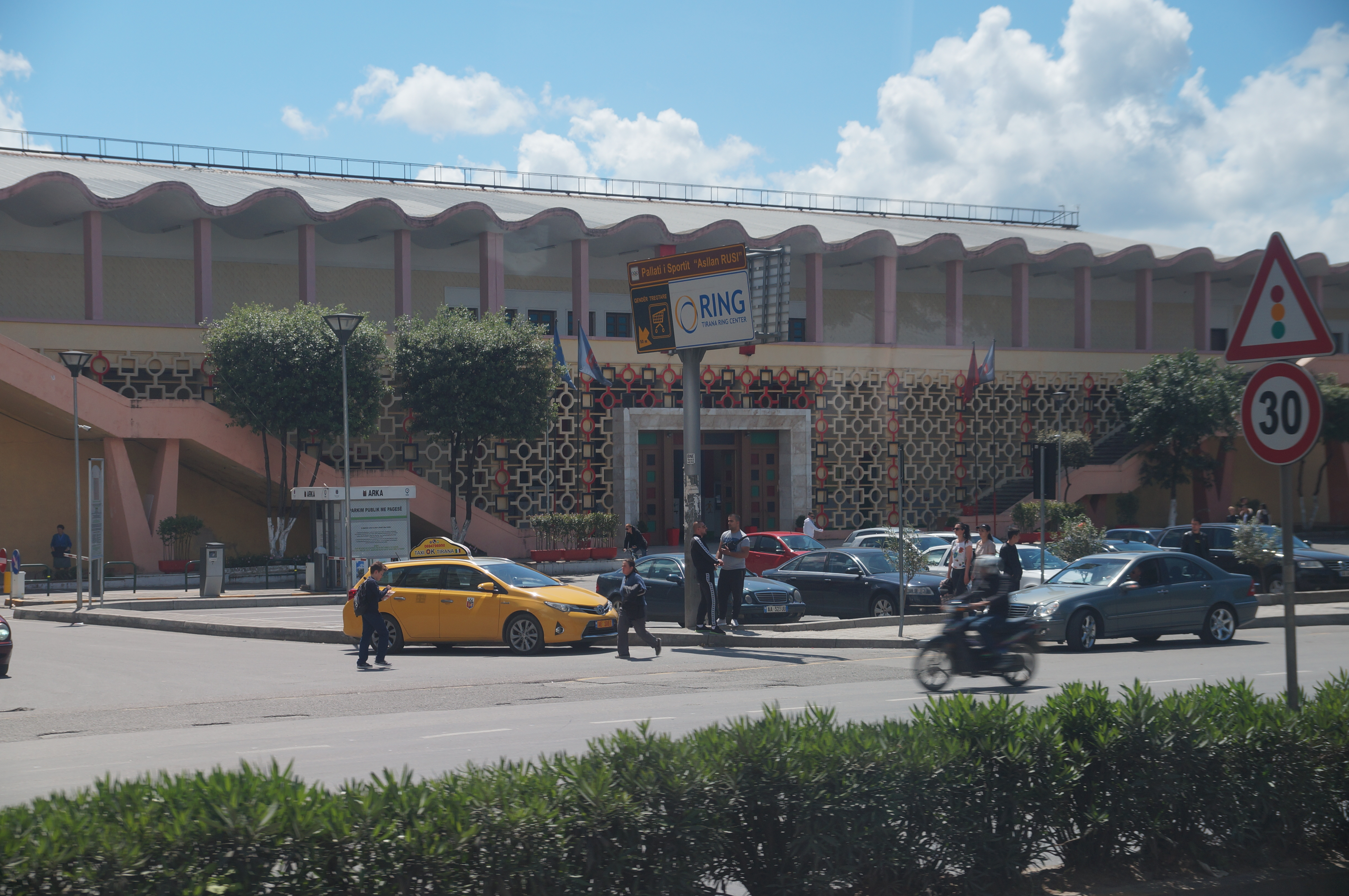
- Interactive map of Asllan Rusi Sports Palace
- Former names: Pallati i Sportit Partizani (1963–1996)
- Location: Rruga Dritan Hoxha, Tirana, Albania
- Coordinates: 41°20′00″N 19°48′05″E
- Owner: Municipality of Tirana
- Operator: Municipality of Tirana
- Capacity: 4,000
- Surface: Parquet Floor
- Scoreboard: Electric

Construction
- Groundbreaking: 1962
- Built: 10 July 1963
- Opened: 1963
- Architect: Koço Miho

Tenants
- Albania (basketball); Albania (volleyball); PBC Tirana; BC Partizani Tirana; BC Dinamo Tirana; KV Tirana

Asllan Rusi Sports Palace (Albanian: Pallati i Sportit "Asllan Rusi") is an indoor sporting arena located in Tirana, Albania with a seating capacity of 4,000 people. The arena is named after the volleyball player Asllan Rusi.

== Gallery ==
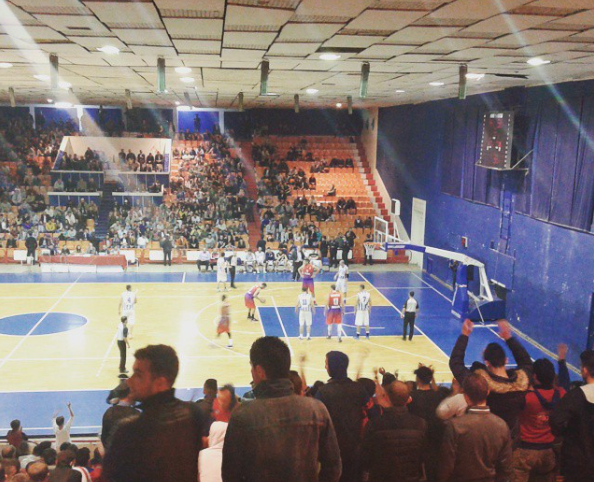

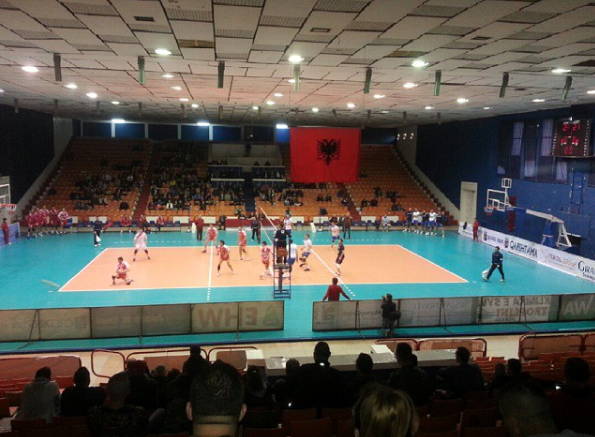

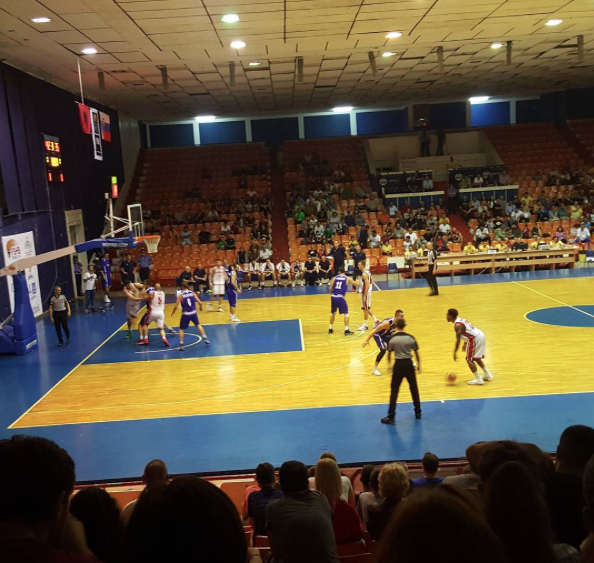

== See also ==
- List of indoor arenas in Albania
