= Goga Basket =

- Leagues: Albanian Basketball League; Albanian Basketball Cup
- Founded: 2015
- Arena: Dhimitraq Goga Sport Centre (700 seats)
- Location: Xhafzotaj, Durrës, Albania
- Team colors: Blue, White
- President: Goga
- Head coach: Afrim Bilali
- Championships: 1 Albanian Basketball League (2019); 1 Albanian Basketball Cup (2020)
Home

Goga Basket is an Albanian basketball team that played in the Albanian Basketball League from 2017 until 2021.

== Domestic achievements ==
- Albanian Basketball League (1):

2019

- Albanian Basketball Cup (1):

2020
