= Albanian Basketball Cup =

Albanian basketball competition

- Current season, competition or edition: 2024 Albanian Basketball Cup
- Sport: Basketball
- Founded: 1951
- Country: Albania
- Continent: (European Union) Europe
- Most recent champions: Besëlidhja (2 titles)
- Most titles: Tirana (20 titles)
- Broadcasters: RTSH; TeleSport
- Related competitions: Albanian Superliga; Albanian First Division

The Albanian Basketball Cup, is the top annual national basketball cup competition in Albania. It was created in 1951 by the Albanian Basketball Federation and the sides with the most titles are Tirana, who have won the competition on 20 occasions.

== Title holders ==
- 1951: Partizani
- 1952: Garnizoni Tirana
- 1956: Puna Durrës
- 1957: Vllaznia
- 1958: Vllaznia
- 1960: Partizani
- 1961: Tirana
- 1962: Tirana
- 1963: Tirana
- 1965: Lokomotiva Durrës
- 1966: Vllaznia
- 1967: Vllaznia
- 1968: Vllaznia
- 1969: 17 Nëntori
- 1970: Partizani
- 1971: 17 Nëntori
- 1972: Partizani
- 1973: 17 Nëntori
- 1974: Dinamo
- 1975: Partizani
- 1976: Partizani
- 1977: 17 Nëntori
- 1978: Partizani
- 1979: Dinamo
- 1980: Partizani
- 1981: Vllaznia
- 1982: Partizani
- 1983: Partizani (*)
- 1984: Partizani
- 1985: Vllaznia
- 1986: Dinamo
- 1987: Partizani
- 1988: 17 Nëntori
- 1989: Partizani
- 1990: Partizani
- 1991: Dinamo
- 1992: Dinamo
- 1993: Dinamo
- 1994: Vllaznia
- 1995: Partizani
- 1996: Vllaznia
- 1997: Studenti
- 1998: Vllaznia (*)
- 1999: Dinamo
- 2000: Tirana
- 2001: Tirana (*)
- 2002: Tirana
- 2003: Valbona
- 2003–04: Valbona
- 2004–05: Valbona
- 2005–06: Valbona
- 2006–07: Tirana
- 2007–08: Tirana
- 2008–09: Tirana
- 2009–10: Studenti
- 2010–11: Tirana
- 2011–12: Tirana
- 2012–13: Kamza Basket
- 2013–14: Vllaznia
- 2014–15: Vllaznia
- 2015–16: Kamza Basket
- 2016–17: Tirana
- 2017–18: Tirana
- 2018–19: Teuta
- 2019–20: Goga Basket
- 2020–21: Teuta
- 2021–22: Tirana
- 2022–23: Teuta
- 2023–24: Tirana (**)
- 2024–25: Besëlidhja
- 2025–26: Besëlidhja

== Finals ==
Season	Winner	Score	Runners-up	Venue	Location
2012–13	Kamza	82–67	Vllaznia	Asllan Rusi Sports Palace	Tirana
2013–14	Vllaznia	106–83	Tirana	Qazim Dërvishi Sports Palace	Shkodër
2014–15	Vllaznia	75-63	Kamza	Asllan Rusi Sports Palace	Tirana
2015–16	Kamza	64–60	Tirana	Qazim Dërvishi Sports Palace	Shkodër
2016–17	Tirana	89-73	Teuta	Ramazan Njala Sports Palace	Durrës
2017–18	Tirana	76–62	Teuta	Tirana Olympic Park	Tirana
2018–19	Teuta	95–81	Goga Basket	Tirana Olympic Park	Tirana
2019–20	Goga Basket	80–70	Vllaznia	Tirana Olympic Park	Tirana
2020–21	Teuta	90-84	Goga Basket	Dhimitraq Goga Palace	Durrës
2021–22	Tirana	77-63	Vllaznia	Farie Hoti Sports Palace	Tirana
2022–23	Teuta	82-74	Kamza Basket	Dhimitraq Goga Palace	Durrës
2023–24	Tirana	91-74	Besëlidhja	Feti Borova Sports Palace	Tirana
2024–25	Besëlidhja	85-73	Vllaznia	Dhimitraq Goga Palace	Durrës
2025–26	Besëlidhja	104-65	Tirana	Dhimitraq Goga Palace	Durrës

== Performance by club ==
Club	Winner	Years
Tirana	20	1961, 1962, 1963, 1969, 1971, 1973, 1977, 1988, 2000, 2001, 2002, 2007, 2008, 2009, 2011, 2012, 2017, 2018, 2022, 2024
Partizani	15	1951, 1960, 1970, 1972, 1975, 1976, 1978, 1980, 1982, 1983, 1984, 1987, 1989, 1990, 1995
Vllaznia	12	1957, 1958, 1966, 1967, 1968, 1981, 1985, 1994, 1996, 1998, 2014, 2015
Dinamo	6	1974, 1979, 1986, 1991, 1992, 1993, 1999
Kamza Basket	6	2003, 2004, 2005, 2006, 2013, 2016
Teuta	5	1956, 1965, 2019, 2021, 2023
Besëlidhja	2	2025,2026
Studenti	2	1997, 2010
Goga Basket	1	2020
Garnizoni Tirana	1	1952
