= Partizani Basket =

- Nickname: Demat e kuq (Red Bulls)
- Leagues: A1 Basketball League
- Founded: 1946
- History: 1946–present
- Arena: Asllan Rusi Palace of Sports
- Location: Tirana, Albania
- Team colors: Red
- Head coach: Arben Fagu
- Championships: 33 Albanian Championships
Home	Away

Partizani Basket is a basketball team that play in the Albanian A-1 League. It is the most successful club in the Albanian Basketball history with 33 championship titles won.

== Honors ==
- Albanian League (33):

1951, 1952, 1953, 1954, 1956, 1958, 1959, 1960, 1964, 1967–1968, 1968–1969, 1969–1970, 1971–1972, 1972–1973, 1973–1974, 1974–1975, 1975–1976, 1976–1977, 1977–1978, 1978–1979, 1979–1980, 1980–1981, 1981–1982, 1982–1983, 1983–1984, 1984–1985, 1985–1986, 1986–1987, 1987–1988, 1988–1989, 1990–1991, 1991–1992, 1995–1996

- Albanian Cup (16):

1951, 1952, 1960, 1970, 1972, 1975, 1976, 1978, 1980, 1982, 1983, 1984, 1987, 1989, 1990, 1995

- Albanian First Division (1):

2016-17

== European competitions ==
The history of B.C. Partizani Tirana in the European competitions starts on December 18, 1968, when Italian champions Pallacanestro Cantù (then Oransoda Cantù) were seeking an “easy journey” in Albania when it had to meet B.C. Partizani Tirana in the Champion Club's Cup (in that time the highest European competition organized by FIBA). The match ended with the result 73–73. The playmaker of B.C. Partizani Tirana, Agim Fagu scored 48 points in this match, and for that was awarded with the “FIBA Banner Badge” by the Secretary-General of FIBA, William Jones, who was present at this match.

BC Partizani Tirana first competed for the Albanian Basketball Superleague in the 1969–70 FIBA European Champions Cup, but lost both their first-round games against CS Dinamo București. In the 1970–71 FIBA European Champions Cup, forfeited against İTÜ from Turkey in the first round due to an cholera outbreak at the time in Turkey

In the 1972–73 FIBA European Champions Cup BC Partizani Tirana faced Jeunesse Sportivo Alep from Syria, who withdrew yet again, allowing BC Partizani Tirana to progress to the round of 16 for the first time in their history. They then faced Crvena zvezda from Yugoslavia, losing both games. The 1973–74 FIBA European Champions Cup campaign saw even bigger success for BC Partizani Tirana, who faced Csepel SC in Hungary. Despite an unlucky 57–58 loss away, at home the Albanian side won a FIBA European Champions Cup match for the first time, 78–71, to progress yet again in the round of 16 for the third year running. There, Partizani Tirana faced Wienerberger from Austria. They proved for the first time to be competitive in such a high stage, winning with 72–71. In the second leg in Wien missed their chance to qualify for the quarterfinals, losing 78–68.

In the 1974–75 FIBA European Champions Cup Partizani Tirana played Sparta Bertrange away in Luxemburg, and won comfortably with 103-89, for their first away win in a FIBA Cup competition. At home in Tirana they beat the opposition deservedly with 90-70, resulting in an impressive aggregate score of 193–159 in the process. In the round of sixteen Partizani Tirana had to face Bulgarian side BC Balkan Botevgrad, but withdrew before the first leg and forfeited their two matches, losing the chance to qualify for the next round as well.

After some years where BC Partizani Tirana did not participate in the FIBA European Champions Cup, they returned in the 1978–79 FIBA European Champions Cup, competing for the first time in the quarterfinals. In Group E they faced KK Bosna Royal, BC Brno and AEL Limassol B.C. as their opponents. In the first match they had to face at home BC Brno, Partizani beating them comfortably with 100–79 showing a strong display against a tough opponent. In the next match they faced group favourites KK Bosna Royal away in Sarajevo. Partizani lost the match 64–99. In the third match of the quarterfinals they faced AEL Limassol at home. They beat them with an impressive result of 151–58 at the process being its highest win in this competition. As the second half of the tournament progressed Partizani Tirana faced BC Brno away. It was the most important match for Partizani do to keeping their chances a live for qualifying into the semifinals. At the start of this match Partizani could keep up against their opponents, scoring decent points and keeping the result close. At the halftime they were just four points behind, with the score at 41–46. In the second half Partizani couldn't compete with the same energy as they did in the first half and lost the match 104–83 and in the process their chance to qualify for the semifinals.

In the following 1978–79 FIBA European Champions Cup season B.C. Partizani Tirana faced in the Quarterfinal Groupstage in group E KK Partizan Belgrade, Budapesti Honvéd SE and Al Ittihad Aleppo respectively. BC Partizani Tirana would show a strong display. Winning four matches alone three at Home. Defeating Budapesti Honvéd SE at home with 91-85 then KK Partizan Belgrade with 101-98 and Al Ittihad Aleppo at home with an result of 105-93. To finish second in this Group, missing out close on the semifinals at the end. Partizani was among the best twelve clubs of clubs of Europe.
