= Kamza Basket =

- Leagues: Albanian Basketball League; Albanian Basketball Cup; Liga Unike
- Founded: 1962
- History: KB Dajti; 1962–200? KB Valbona Bajram Curri; 200?–2010; Kamza Basket; 2010–present
- Arena: Salla Sportive Bathore (400 seats)
- Location: Tirana, Albania
- Team colors: Blue, White
- President: Rakip Suli
- Head coach: Eni Llazani
- Championships: 6 Albanian Basketball League (2003, 2004, 2005, 2006, 2007, 2013); 6 Albanian Basketball Cup (2003, 2004, 2005, 2006, 2013, 2016); 5 Albanian Basketball Supercup (2004, 2005, 2006, 2007, 2013)
Home

Kamza Basket is an Albanian basketball team that plays in the Albanian Basketball League. They were previously named BC Valbona Bajram Curri and based in the northern city of Tropoja, but relocated to Kamez in 2010.

== Domestic achievements ==
- Albanian Basketball League (6):

2003, 2004, 2005, 2006, 2007, 2013

- Albanian Basketball Cup (6):

2003, 2004, 2005, 2006, 2013, 2016

- Albanian Basketball Supercup (2)

2013, 2014

== Roster ==
BC Kamza Basket roster
Players
Coaches

Pos.	No.	Nat.	Name	Ht.	Wt.	Age
	4	(Albania)	Hamati, Julian			33 – 16 November 1992
PG	5	(Albania)	Llazani, Eni	1.88 m (6 ft 2 in)	82 kg (181 lb)	36 – 30 November 1989
	6	(Albania)	Muhametaj, Ergys			24 – 19 July 2001
	7	(Albania)	Çela, Alban			36 – 27 December 1989
	8	(Albania)	Muhametaj, Gledis			29 – 8 February 1997
PG	9	(Albania)	Coco, NaZareno	1.87 m (6 ft 2 in)		25 – 9 September 2000
PG	10	(Albania)	Vaqarri, Majk	1.80 m (5 ft 11 in)		32 – 11 February 1994
	12	(Albania)	Balliu, Mario			31 – 16 January 1995
	13	(Albania)	Gjoka, Fatjon			38 – 14 April 1988
SG	14	(Albania)	Huqi, Jeton			30 – 5 March 1996
	21	(Albania)	Fjolla, Ennio			35 – 27 May 1991
C	22	(Albania)	Birçaj, Fjorentin	2.05 m (6 ft 9 in)	115 kg (254 lb)	36 – 8 August 1989
C	23	(Albania)	Qeleshi, Klevis	2.04 m (6 ft 8 in)		31 – 9 February 1995

Head coach

- (Albania) Adem Muhametaj

Legend

- (C) Team captain
- Injured

== Notable former players ==
Albania & Kosovo

- (Albania) Eni Llazani
- (Albania) Nikolin Arra
- (Albania) Gjon Ndoja
- (Albania) Vildan Mitku
- (Albania) Afrim Bilali

Albania & Kosovo

- (Albania) Endrit Hysenagolli
- (Albania) Endrit Hysenagolli
- (Albania) Algert Gjonaj
- (Kosovo) (Croatia) Edmond Azemi

Foreign

- (United States) Zahir Porter
