= KB Teuta =

- Nickname: Djemt e Detit
- Leagues: Albanian Basketball Superliga; Liga Unike
- Founded: 1946
- Arena: Ramazan Njala Sports Palace
- Capacity: 2,000
- Location: Durrës, Albania
- Team colors: Blue, White
- President: Arqile Gorea
- Team captain: Kristi Gorea
- Championships: 4 Albanian Superliga (1947, 1955, 2021, 2022); 4 Albanian Cup (1956, 1965, 2019, 2021); 3 Albanian Supercup (2018, 2019, 2021); 1 Albanian First Division (2015)
Home	Away

KB Teuta is an Albanian basketball team that plays in the Albanian Basketball Superliga, the highest division in the Albanian Basketball League. The club was founded in 1925 as part of the multi disciplinary KS Teuta Durrës.

== Domestic achievements ==
- Albanian Basketball League (4):

1947, 1955, 2021, 2022

  - Runner-up (3):

2016, 2018, 2019

- Albanian Basketball Cup (4):

1956, 1965, 2018-19, 2020-21

  - Runner-up (2):

2016-17, 2017-18

- Albanian Basketball Supercup (3):

2017-18, 2018-19, 2021-22

- Albanian Basketball First Division (1):

2014-15

  - Runner-up (1):

2004-05

- Balkan League
  - Runner-up (1):

2018–19

== Players ==
=== Current roster ===
Note: Flags indicate national team eligibility at FIBA-sanctioned events. Players may hold other non-FIBA nationalities not displayed.

BC Teuta Durrës roster
Players
Coaches

Pos.	No.	Nat.	Name	Ht.	Age
PG	00	(Greece)	Lappas, Georgios	1.85 m (6 ft 1 in)	39 – 17 May 1986
PG	0	(United States)	Ramme, Griffin	1.90 m (6 ft 3 in)	35 – 1 November 1989
SF	4	(Albania)	Gorea, Kristi (C)	2.00 m (6 ft 7 in)	28 – 2 January 1997
F	5	(Albania)	Elezi, Hidajet	1.92 m (6 ft 4 in)	24 – 21 July 2001
PF	8	(Albania)	Hamati, Julian	1.98 m (6 ft 6 in)	32 – 16 November 1992
PG	9	(Albania)	Proj, Panajot	1.75 m (5 ft 9 in)	22 – 25 January 2003
G	10	(United States)	Pelissier, Mitch	1.93 m (6 ft 4 in)	28 – 25 March 1997
PG	11	(Albania)	Pasha, Ili	1.89 m (6 ft 2 in)	34 – 2 August 1991
C	14	(Albania)	Hysenagolli, Endrit	2.08 m (6 ft 10 in)	37 – 5 July 1988
F/C	22	(United States)	McDevitt, Mike	2.03 m (6 ft 8 in)	30 – 29 January 1995
PF	23	(Albania)	Birçaj, Fjorentin	2.05 m (6 ft 9 in)	36 – 8 August 1989
G	34	(Montenegro)	Bakič, Filip	1.90 m (6 ft 3 in)	28 – 30 June 1997

Head coach

- (Montenegro) Nikola Milatovič

Assistant coach(es)

- (Albania) Xhelal Kalaja
- (Albania) Besim Dervishaj

Legend

- (C) Team captain
- Injured

- Roster
Updated: October 6, 2019
