= Qazim Dervishi Sports Palace =

Sports arena in Shkodër, Albania

Coordinates: 42.0712°N 19.5058°E

Qazim Dërvishi Sports Palace
- Pallati I Sportit Qazim Dërvishi
- Interactive map of Qazim Dërvishi Sports Palace
- Location: Rruga Brojej, Shkodër, Albania
- Owner: Municipality of Shkodër
- Operator: Municipality of Shkodër
- Capacity: 1,200

Construction
- Built: 196?–1969
- Opened: 1 May 1969; 57 years ago
- Renovated: 2014–2015

Tenants
- KB Vllaznia; KH Vllaznia

Qazim Dërvishi Sports Palace is a multi-use sports arena in Shkodër, Albania. It is the owned and operated by the Municipality of Shkodër and it is the home of the multidisciplinary KS Vllaznia. It is named after Qazim Dervishi, who was a sportsman from Shkodër.
