= Ramazan Njala Sports Palace =

Sports arena in Durrës, Albania

- Pallati I Sportit Ramazan Njala
- Location: Rruga e Dëshmorëve, Durrës, Albania
- Owner: Municipality of Durrës
- Operator: Municipality of Durrës
- Capacity: 2,000

Tenants
- KB Teuta, KV Teuta

Ramazan Njala Sports Palace is a multi-use sports arena in Durrës, Albania. It is the owned and operated by the Municipality of Durrës and it is the home of the multidisciplinary KS Teuta Durrës. It is named after former athlete Ramazan Njala, who played football, basketball, volleyball, handball and water polo as well as being an accomplished track and field athlete and swimmer.
