= KB Vllaznia =

- Leagues: Albanian Basketball League; Albanian Basketball Cup
- Founded: 1946
- Arena: Qazim Dervishi Sports Palace
- Capacity: 1,200
- Location: Shkodër, Albania
- Team colors
- President: Alban Xhaferi
- Team manager: Blendi Dibra
- Head coach: Eni Llazani
- Championships: 9 Albanian Leagues; 12 Albanian Cups; 1 Albanian Supercup
Home	Away

KB Vllaznia is a professional basketball team based in Shkodër, Albania. The club is one of the major basketball teams in Albania, having won 9 leagues, 12 cups and one supercup. The basketball team, founded in 1946, is one of the oldest in the country.

== Trophies ==
- Albanian Leagues: 9

1967, 1990, 1993, 1997, 1998, 2000, 2014, 2015, 2015-16

- Albanian Cups: 12

1957, 1958, 1966, 1967, 1968, 1981, 1985, 1994, 1996, 1998, 2014, 2015

- Albanian Supercup: 1

1999

== Players ==
Note: Flags indicate national team eligibility at FIBA-sanctioned events. Players may hold other non-FIBA nationalities not displayed.

KB Vllaznia roster
Players
Coaches

Pos.	No.	Nat.	Name	Ht.	Wt.	Age
PF/C	4	(United States)	Martin, Jordan	2.04 m (6 ft 8 in)	107 kg (236 lb)	31 – 16 December 1993
PF	5	(Albania)	Bekteshi, Damian	1.88 m (6 ft 2 in)	79 kg (174 lb)	33 – 6 December 1991
SG	8	(Albania)	Shabani, Antonio	1.93 m (6 ft 4 in)	94 kg (207 lb)	29 – 4 September 1995
PG	10	(Albania)	Llazani, Erjon	1.83 m (6 ft 0 in)	86 kg (190 lb)	38 – 27 May 1987
CG	11	(Canada)	Babb-Harrison, Jaylen	1.93 m (6 ft 4 in)	86 kg (190 lb)	31 – 7 August 1993
G/F	13	(Albania)	Rakaj, Reidi	2.01 m (6 ft 7 in)	95 kg (209 lb)	28 – 7 February 1997
C	14	(Albania)	Faslija, Herion	2.05 m (6 ft 9 in)	104 kg (229 lb)	36 – 2 May 1989
PF	14	(Albania)	Lekndreaj, Dod	1.97 m (6 ft 6 in)	94 kg (207 lb)	29 – 21 April 1996
PG	17	(Albania)	Shestani, Robert	1.89 m (6 ft 2 in)	86 kg (190 lb)	31 – 14 September 1993
SG	23	(Albania)	Memcaj, Elian	1.93 m (6 ft 4 in)	76 kg (168 lb)	23 – 6 March 2002
PF	24	(Montenegro)	Kusovac, Petar	2.03 m (6 ft 8 in)	96 kg (212 lb)	31 – 27 August 1993
PF/C	33	(United States)	Voss, Colin	2.01 m (6 ft 7 in)	107 kg (236 lb)	33 – 9 November 1991
C	56	(Serbia)	Vujović, Nikola	2.10 m (6 ft 11 in)	98 kg (216 lb)	32 – 10 March 1993
PF	88	(Bosnia and Herzegovina)	Barukčija, Amar	1.99 m (6 ft 6 in)	99 kg (218 lb)	26 – 16 January 1999

Head coach

- (Montenegro) Darko Vujačić

Assistant coach(es)

- (Albania) Ervin Berdica
- (Albania) Astrit Zaganjori

Legend

- (C) Team captain
- Injured

== Season by season ==
Season	Domestic competitions				Cup	European competitions		
Season	Tier	League	Pos.	Postseason	Cup	Tier	League	Result
2006–07	1	Superliga	2	Semifinalist	Semifinalist	—		
2007–08	1	Superliga	7	Quarterfinalist	–	—		
2008–09	1	Superliga	6	Runner-up	–	—		
2009–10	1	Superliga	4	Semifinalist	Quarterfinalist	—		
2010–11	1	Superliga	5	–	Quarterfinalist	—		
2011–12	1	Superliga	3	Semifinalist	Semifinalist	—		
2012–13	1	Superliga	3	Runner-up	Quarterfinalist	—		
2013–14	1	Superliga	1	Champion	Champion	—		
2014–15	1	Superliga	2	Champion	Champion	—		
2015–16	1	Superliga	2	Champion	Runner-up	—		

== Notable players ==
- (Albania) Nikolin Arra
- (Albania) Damjan Bekteshi
- (Albania) Herion Faslija
- (Albania) Bledar Gjeçaj
- (Albania) Algert Gjonaj
- (Albania) Daniel Lekndreaj
- (Albania) Eni Llazani
- (Albania) Gjon Ndoja
- (Albania) Robert Shestani
- (Slovenia) Mirza Sarajlija
- (United States) Correy Allen
- (United States) Johnathan Stove
