= KB Tirana =

- Nickname: Bardheblutë (The White and Blues)
- Leagues: Albanian Superliga; Liga Unike; Albanian Cup
- Founded: 1946
- History: 1946–present
- Arena: Farie Hoti Sports Palace
- Capacity: 1,200
- Location: Tirana, Albania
- Team colors: Blue, white
- President: Angelo Koleka
- Vice-president: Angelo Koleka
- Head coach: Redi Vogli
- Championships: 21 Albanian Superligas; 20 Albanian Cups; 9 Albanian Supercups
Home	Away

KB Tirana are an Albanian professional basketball team based in Tirana, which is the basketball branch of SK Tirana. They compete in the Albanian Basketball Superleague and in the Liga Unike. The club plays its home domestic games at the Farie Hoti Sports Palace, and they play their international games at the Asllan Rusi Sports Palace.

Tirana are one of the two most successful teams in the history of Albanian basketball (men), having won the Albanian League 21 times, the Albanian Cup a record of 20 times and the Albanian Supercups a record of 9 times. They have won a total of 50 trophies, which is the most in the country.

== History ==
=== Early years (1920–1943) ===
On 15 August 1920, shortly after Tirana became the capital city of Albania, patriot and football enthusiast Palokë Nika, who had already formed Vllaznia Shkodër built and trained a new team in Tirana, with A. Erebara, P. Jakova, A. Hoxha, Anastas Koja, P. Berisha, Avni Zajmi, H. Fortuzi, B. Pazari, L. Berisha, S. Frasheri, H. Alizoti, A. Gjitomi, and V. Fekeci. The name of the team was Gjurmuesit Republikanë, which a few months later was changed into Agimi Sports Association. The name Agimi (in English: Dawn), was taken from the building in the centre of Tirana near to where they would hold meetings. In 1925 the association's governing council was elected and its members were Avni Zajmi, Selman Stërmasi, B. Toptani, Irfan Gjinali and Anastas Koja. On 16 August 1927, which was the seventh anniversary of the formation of the Agimi Sports Association, the club's name changed into Sportklub Tirana, which would be commonly referred to as SK Tirana. On that day the president of the club was Teki Selenica. Although SK Tirana's early history was dominated by its emphasis on its football department, basketball was experiencing a rise in popularity in Albania at the time and basketball clubs across the country were being set up and friendly games were occasionally being played between clubs from different cities.

=== Early history and trophies (1944–1972) ===
After the end of World War II and the liberation of Albania in 1944 Albania fell in the hands of the socialist dictator Enver Hoxha, and soon after sport in the country became organised, with national teams and domestic competitions being set up by the communist regime, and this happened with basketball in 1946. In early March 1946 at the Nacional movie theatre in Tirana, the ruling Communist Politburo had instructed the club to change its name to 17 Nëntori in honour of the Liberation of Tirana which took place on 17 November 1944 and later that year 17 Nëntori became a founding member of the Albanian Basketball League and they won the inaugural National Championship that took place in 1946. They failed to retain the title the following season as local rivals Partizani won the National Championship, but 17 Nëntori were to win 3 consecutive titles between 1948 and 1950.

=== Recent dominance (1999 onwards) ===
After 11 years drought Tirana got the right roster and coach and started winning trophies yet again. From 1999 to 2018 they won 28 such, dominating in the country. On 30 August 2016 it was announced that Tirana would compete in the 2016–17 Balkan International Basketball League, becoming only the second Albanian club to do so after BC Vllaznia. Ahead of the 2016–17 season they appointed Macedonian Slobodan Petrovski as head coach, and signed Albanian internationals Endrit Hysenagolli, Erkand Karaj as well as foreigners Nemanja Gavranić, Griffin Ramme and Manuel Johnson. Tirana played fellow debutants KB Trepça from Kosovo on 10 October 2016 at the Asllan Rusi Sports Palace in front of around 1,100 spectators, and they won 78–66 to claim a victory in their first ever Balkan League game.

Despite their dominance on the domestic stage and even after bringing in several quality new players and a coach KB Tirana has so far failed to deliver the expected performance in the Balkan League; although they did manage to reach the play-offs during the 2017–18 season and secured a few memorable victories.Although the team has played in this competition for only a few seasons,it requires more experience and likely the addition of more skilled players to achieve success.

== Home arenas ==
Tirana plays its domestic homes games at the Farie Hoti Sports Palace, which has a capacity of around 1,200. Before this arena was built they played their home games at the 2,800 seater Asllan Rusi Sports Palace, which is the main sports arena in Tirana and indeed all of Albania. As of 2016, they played their Balkan International Basketball League home games at the Asllan Rusi Sports Palace as the Farie Hoti Sports Palace does not meet the licensing requirements to stage such games.

However, in 2017 club moved to the Tirana Olympic Park, as a requirement for playing the Balkan League.

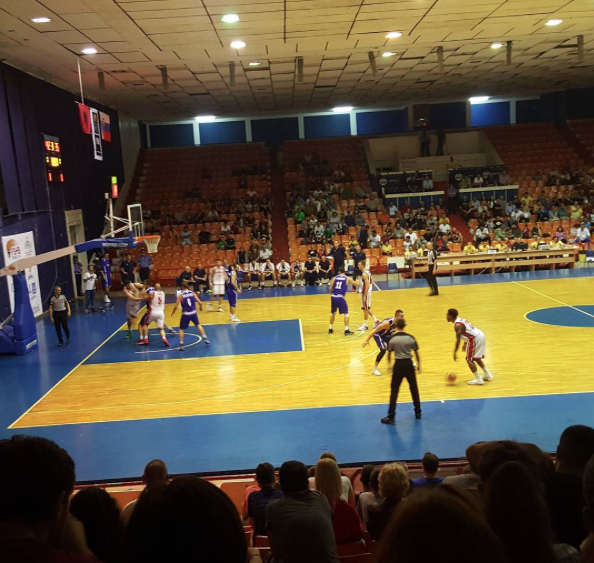
Asllan Rusi during Albania vs Slovakia.

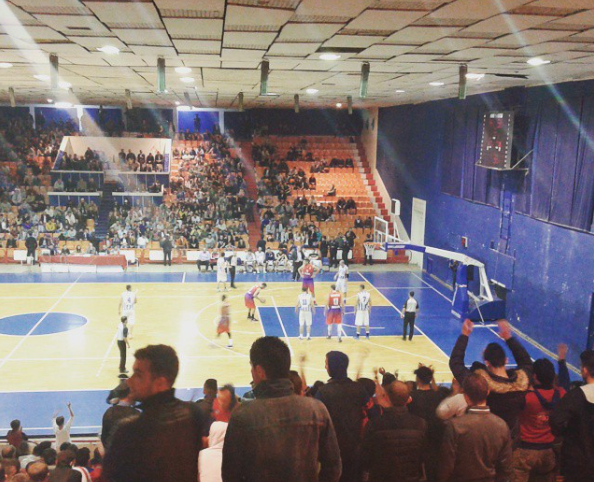
Asllan Rusi during a Tirana game.

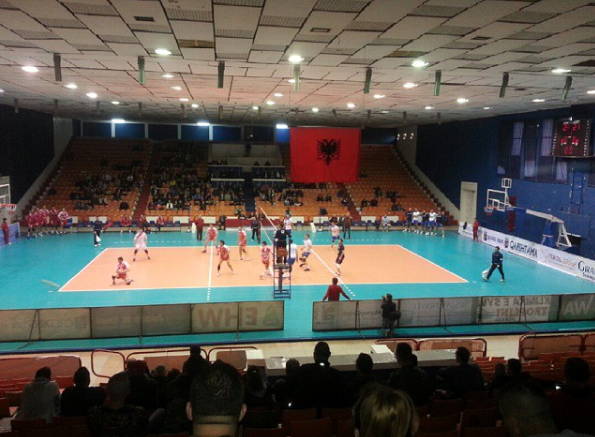
Asllan Rusi during a volleyball game.

== Roster ==
=== 2025–26 roster ===
Note: Flags indicate national team eligibility at FIBA-sanctioned events. Players may hold other non-FIBA nationalities not displayed.

KB Tirana roster
Players
Coaches

Pos.	No.	Nat.	Name	Ht.	Wt.	Age
PG	2	(United States) (Mexico)	Jeffers, Josiah	1.85 m (6 ft 1 in)		26 – 17 August 2000
G	6	(Albania) (Kosovo)	Sharra, Aron	1.94 m (6 ft 4 in)		20 – 6 July 2006
PF	9	(Albania)	Nika, Aleksis	2.04 m (6 ft 8 in)		22 – 25 May 2004
G	10	(Albania)	Strazimiri, Klein	1.88 m (6 ft 2 in)		28 – 22 April 1998
C	11	(Albania)	Rama, Eiden	2.05 m (6 ft 9 in)		23 – 24 May 2003
SG	13	(Albania)	Ndreça, Giseld	1.93 m (6 ft 4 in)		25 – 27 January 2001
C	14	(Albania)	Hysenagolli, Endrit	2.10 m (6 ft 11 in)		38 – 5 July 1988
G	15	(Albania)	Lilaj, Richard	1.90 m (6 ft 3 in)		24 – 11 July 2002
SF	55	(United States)	Massie, Johnathan	1.95 m (6 ft 5 in)

Head coach

- (Albania) Erkand Karaj

Legend

- (C) Team captain
- Injured

- Roster

=== 2024–25 squad changes ===
==== In ====
Position	Player	Moving from
Power Forward	(Albania) Frenki Lilaj	Belfast Star (Republic of Ireland)
Small Forward	(Albania) Aleksis Nika	Partizani Tirana (Albania)
Center	(Albania) Eiden Rama	Partizani Tirana (Albania)
Shooting Guard	(Albania) Marko Pulaj	KB Tirana U20
Shooting Guard	(Albania) Loert Peqini	KB Tirana U20

==== Out ====
Position	Player	Moving to
Poing Guard	(Albania) Sotiraq Kreste	KB Pogradec (Albania)
Shooting Guard	(Albania) Lion Alimani	KB Besëlidhja Lezhë (Albania)
Shooting Guard	(United States) Jordan Robinson	Free agent
Point Guard	(United States) Gerad Davis	Free agent
Guard/Forward	(United States) Isayas Aris	Free Agent

== Honours ==
- Albanian League (21):

1946, 1948, 1949, 1950, 1957, 1961, 1962, 1963, 1965, 1971, 1999, 2001, 2002, 2008, 2009, 2010, 2011, 2012, 2017, 2018, 2023

- Albanian Cup (20):

1961, 1962, 1963, 1969, 1971, 1973, 1977, 1988, 2000, 2001, 2002, 2007, 2008, 2009, 2011, 2012, 2017, 2018, 2022, 2024 (Record)

- Albanian Supercup (9):

2001, 2003, 2008, 2009, 2010, 2011, 2012, 2017, 2023 (Record)

== International competitions ==
=== Tirana in Europe ===
Season	Competition	Round	Club	Home	Away	Aggregate
1970–71	FIBA European Cup Winners' Cup	1R	(Socialist Federal Republic of Yugoslavia) KK Zadar	62–72	60–73	122–145
1971–72	FIBA European Champions Cup	1R	(Syria) CJS Aleppo	20–0	20–0	40–0
1971–72	FIBA European Champions Cup	2R	(Socialist Federal Republic of Yugoslavia) Jugoplastika	77–90	58–85	135–175
1973–74	FIBA European Cup Winners' Cup	1R	(Socialist Federal Republic of Yugoslavia) KK Crvena zvezda	83–99	70–114	163–213

Notes

- QR: Qualifying round
- 1R: First round
- 2R: Second round

=== Tirana in the BIBL ===
Season	Competition	Round	Club	Home	Away	Aggregate	Advancing
2016–17	Balkan International Basketball League	First Stage; Group B	(Kosovo) Trepça	78–66	74–68	6th	
2016–17	Balkan International Basketball League	First Stage; Group B	(North Macedonia) Feni Industries	63–72	57–98	6th	
2016–17	Balkan International Basketball League	First Stage; Group B	(Montenegro) Sutjeska	56–79	61–77	6th	
2016–17	Balkan International Basketball League	First Stage; Group B	(North Macedonia) Karpoš Sokoli	83–100	74–78	6th	
2016–17	Balkan International Basketball League	First Stage; Group B	(Kosovo) Peja	76–73	72-96	6th	
2017–18	Balkan International Basketball League	Regular Season	(North Macedonia) Blokotehna	67-92	68-100	6th	
2017–18	Balkan International Basketball League	Regular Season	(Bulgaria) Rilski Sportist	78-99	79-94	6th	
2017–18	Balkan International Basketball League	Regular Season	(Bulgaria) Academic Plovdiv	61-97	69-90	6th	
2017–18	Balkan International Basketball League	Regular Season	(Bulgaria) Levski	79-76	52-105	6th	
2017–18	Balkan International Basketball League	Regular Season	(North Macedonia) Kumanovo	75–73	cancelled	6th	
2017–18	Balkan International Basketball League	Regular Season	(Kosovo) Bashkimi	75-69	95-101	6th	
2017–18	Balkan International Basketball League	Regular Season	(Montenegro) Ibar	95-65	102-107	6th	
2017–18	Balkan International Basketball League	Play-Off	(Bulgaria) Levski	67-73	75-98	0-2	

== Head coaches ==
Coach	Years active
(Albania) Bujar Shehu	1966–1973
(Albania) Feti Borova	1973–1988
(Albania) Bujar Shehu	1988–2002
(Albania) Bujar Shehu	2012–2015
(Albania) Roland Avrami	2015–2016
(North Macedonia) Slobodan Petrovski	2016
(Montenegro) Nikola Milatović	2016–2017
(Greece) Antonios Doukas	2017-2018
(Albania) Erkand Karaj	2018–2026
(Albania) Redi Vogli	2026–

== Management ==
- Club Owners: Municipality of Tirana and SK Tirana
- Executive director: Spiro Koleka
- General manager: Angelo Koleka
- Team manager: Melzin Lazimi
