= Farie Hoti Sports Palace =

Multi-use sports arena in Tirana, Albania

- Pallati i Sportit Farie Hoti
- Location: Tirana, Albania
- Owner: SK Tirana; Tiranë Municipality
- Capacity: 1,200

Construction
- Renovated: 2013; 2016
- Cost: 2013: 4,848,062 lek (€34,906 at the time)

Tenants
- KB Tirana; KB Tirana women KV Tirana; KV Tirana women

Farie Hoti Sports Palace is a multi-use sports arena in Tirana, Albania. It is the home of SK Tirana, where KB Tirana, KB Tirana women, KV Tirana and KV Tirana women play their home games. It is named after Farie Hoti, who played for KV Tirana women.
