= Albanian Basketball League =

Basketball competition in Albania

Albanian Basketball League (ABL)
- Current season, competition or edition: 2024–25 Albanian Basketball League
- Sport: Basketball
- Founded: 1946
- No. of teams: 6
- Country: Albania
- Continent: (European Union) FIBA Europe (Europe)
- Most recent champion: Besëlidhja (3rd title) (2025–26)
- Most titles: Partizani (33 titles)
- Broadcaster: RTSH
- Level on pyramid: 1st
- Relegation to: First League
- Related competitions: Albanian Cup; Albanian Supercup
- Website: fshb.basketball

The Albanian Basketball League (Albanian: Liga Shqiptare e Basketbollit), officially known as Superliga, is the top-tier men’s professional basketball competition in Albania. Established in 1946 by the Albanian Basketball Federation (FSHB), it is one of the oldest basketball leagues in the Balkans.

Partizani is the most successful club in league history, having won a record 33 titles. The league currently features 6 professional teams.

== History ==
Basketball saw rapid growth in Albania during the post-war period and by the 1970s, almost every city had its own court or arena. However, after the fall of communism, the sport experienced a decline. Many clubs were downsized or dissolved, as players migrated to pursue careers abroad. Fan attendance dropped significantly and basketball lost much of its previous popularity.

A revival began in the mid-1990s, when several cities reestablished their teams and invested in rebuilding the sport. Today, alongside the 12 professional teams, there are numerous amateur clubs across the country looking to advance into the professional leagues.

== Organizational structure ==
In both the Superliga and Liga e Parë, each of the six teams play a 20-game regular season, facing their opponent four times — twice at home and twice away — divided into two separate phases. This structure ensures balanced competition and consistent match activity throughout the season.

At the conclusion of the regular season, the top four teams advance to the playoffs. In the semifinals, the 1st place team plays against the 4th place team, while the 2nd place team faces the 3rd. Each series is played in a best-of-three format, with matches held both home and away until one team wins two games and qualifies for the final.

The final is played over multiple legs, with games alternating between the home courts of the two finalists depending on the draw. The first team to win three games is crowned champion.

Each win awards 2 points and each loss earns 1 point.

At the bottom of the table, the teams that finish in 5th and 6th place respectively are excluded from the playoff stage. The 6th place team is relegated to Liga e Parë, while the 5th place team plays a promotion/relegation playoff against the second-place team from Liga B. The winner secures a spot in the Superliga for the next season.

== Current teams (2025–26) ==
Team	Location	Colours	Arena	Capacity
Apolonia	Fier		Fier Sports Hall	680
Besëlidhja	Lezhë		Asllan Rusi Sports Palace	4,000
Kamza	Kamëz		Bathore Sports Hall	500
Teuta	Durrës		Ramazan Njala Sports Palace	1,663
Tirana	Tirana		Farie Hoti Sports Palace	1,200
Vllaznia	Shkodër		Qazim Dervishi Sports Palace	1,200

== League champions ==
Season	Champion
1945–46	17 Nëntori
1946–47	Ylli Kuq
1947–48	17 Nëntori
1948–49	17 Nëntori
1949–50	17 Nëntori
1950–51	Partizani
1951–52	Partizani
1952–53	Partizani
1953–54	Partizani
1954–55	Teuta
1955–56	Partizani
1956–57	Tirana
1957–58	Partizani
1958–59	Partizani
1959–60	Partizani
1960–61	17 Nëntori
1961–62	17 Nëntori
1962–63	17 Nëntori
1963–64	Partizani
1964–65	17 Nëntori

Season	Champion
1966–67	Vllaznia
1967–68	Partizani
1968–69	Partizani
1969–70	Partizani
1970–71	17 Nëntori
1971–72	Partizani
1972–73	Partizani
1973–74	Partizani
1974–75	Partizani
1975–76	Partizani
1976–77	Partizani
1977–78	Partizani
1978–79	Partizani
1979–80	Partizani
1980–81	Partizani
1981–82	Partizani
1982–83	Partizani
1983–84	Partizani
1984–85	Partizani
1985–86	Partizani

Season	Champion
1986–87	Partizani
1987–88	Partizani
1988–89	Partizani
1989–90	Vllaznia
1990–91	Partizani
1991–92	Partizani
1992–93	Vllaznia
1993–94	Adelin
1994–95	Dinamo
1995–96	Partizani
1996–97	Vllaznia
1997–98	Vllaznia
1998–99	Tirana
1999–00	Vllaznia
2000–01	Tirana
2001–02	Tirana
2002–03	Valbona
2003–04	Valbona
2004–05	Valbona
2005–06	Valbona

Season	Champion
2006–07	Valbona
2007–08	Tirana
2008–09	Tirana
2009–10	Tirana
2010–11	Tirana
2011–12	Tirana
2012–13	Kamza
2013–14	Vllaznia
2014–15	Vllaznia
2015–16	Vllaznia
2016–17	Tirana
2017–18	Tirana
2018–19	Goga
2019–20	Abandoned due to the COVID-19 pandemic
2020–21	Teuta
2021–22	Teuta
2022–23	Tirana
2023–24	Besëlidhja
2024–25	Besëlidhja
2025–26	Besëlidhja

== Title holders ==
Team	Titles	Years won
Partizani	33	1951, 1952, 1953, 1954, 1956, 1958, 1959, 1960, 1964, 1967–68, 1968–69, 1969–70, 1971–72, 1972–73, 1973–74, 1974–75, 1975–76, 1976–77, 1977–78, 1978–79, 1979–80, 1980–81, 1981–82, 1982–83, 1983–84, 1984–85, 1985–86, 1986–87, 1987–88, 1988–89, 1990–91, 1991–92, 1995–96
Tirana	21	1946, 1948, 1949, 1950, 1957, 1961, 1962, 1963, 1965, 1970–71, 1998–99, 2000–01, 2001–02, 2007–08, 2008–09, 2009–10, 2010–11, 2011–12, 2016–17, 2017–18, 2022–23
Vllaznia	9	1966–67, 1989–90, 1992–93, 1996–97, 1997–98, 1999–00, 2013–14, 2014–15, 2015–16
Kamza* (Valbona)	6	2002–03, 2003–04, 2004–05, 2005–06, 2006–07, 2012–13
Teuta	4	1947, 1955, 2020–21, 2021–22
Besëlidhja	3	2023–24, 2024-25,2025-26
Adelin Pogradec	1	1993–94
Dinamo	1	1994–95
Goga	1	2018–19

- Kamza Basket won the title 5 times between 2003 and 2007 as KB Valbona.

== See also ==
- Albanian Basketball Cup
- Albanian Basketball Supercup
- Liga Unike
