= EuroBasket 2022 qualification =

Qualification for the EuroBasket 2022

Tournament details
- Dates: 23 November 2017 – 22 February 2021
- Teams: 41

Official website
- Qualifiers website Pre-qualifiers website

The EuroBasket 2022 qualification was a basketball competition that was played from November 2017 to February 2021, to determine the 20 FIBA Europe nations who would join the automatically qualified co-hosts Czech Republic, Georgia, Italy, and Germany at the EuroBasket 2022 finals tournament.

== Pre-Qualifiers ==
The EuroBasket 2022 Pre-Qualifiers were played by 17 teams over three rounds. The best eight teams advanced to the EuroBasket 2022 Qualifiers.

=== First round ===
The pre-qualifiers first round was played by nine teams: Five eliminated in the 2019 FIBA Basketball World Cup pre-qualifiers, and four teams that did not enter in those qualifiers.

The winner of each group and the best runner-up team qualified for the second round, that gave the option to qualify directly to the EuroBasket qualifiers. The other five teams were dropped to the third round, joining the teams that did not advance to the EuroBasket qualifiers from the second round.

==== Seeding ====
Pot 1 Team Slovakia Albania Cyprus	Pot 2 Team Macedonia Armenia Portugal	Pot 3 Team Switzerland Denmark Luxembourg

All times are local.

==== Group A ====
Pos	Team	Pld	W	L	PF	PA	PD	Pts	Qualification
1	Macedonia	4	3	1	323	293	+30	7	Second round
2	Switzerland	4	2	2	319	330	−11	6	Third round
3	Slovakia	4	1	3	308	327	−19	5	Third round

Source: FIBA
Rules for classification: 1) Classification points; 2) Classification points Head-to-head; 3) Game points difference head-to-head; 4) Game points scored head-to-head; 5) Game points difference in group; 6) Game points difference in group

23 November 2017	Slovakia	66–74	Macedonia	Poprad
18:00	Scoring by quarter: 22–23, 8–21, 13–15, 23–15
	Pts: Sedmák 20; Rebs: Baťka 6 Asts: Baťka, Kuric 4	Boxscore	Pts: Hendrix 21; Rebs: Hendrix 14; Asts: V. Stojanovski 6	Arena: Aréna Poprad; Attendance: 1,420; Referees: Sergiy Chebyshev (UKR), Arnis Ozols (LAT), Konstantin Simonow (GER)

26 November 2017	Macedonia	83–68	Switzerland	Skopje
20:45	Scoring by quarter: 18–12, 20–24, 28–15, 17–17
	Pts: Hendrix 16; Rebs: Hendrix 9 Asts: D. Stojanovski 4	Boxscore	Pts: Mlađan 23; Rebs: Mlađan 9 Asts: Kozić 4	Arena: Jane Sandanski Arena; Attendance: 4,000; Referees: Ognjen Jokić (MNE), Charalampos Karakatsounis (GRE), Özlem Yalman (TUR)

22 February 2018	Switzerland	83–80(OT)	Slovakia	Fribourg
18:30	Scoring by quarter: 15–15, 16–23, 21–22, 19–11, Overtime: 12–9
	Pts: Cotture 25; Rebs: Mlađan 18; Asts: Savoy 7	Boxscore	Pts: Sedmák 19; Rebs: Fusek 7 Asts: three players 5	Arena: Site Sportif Saint-Léonard; Attendance: 858; Referees: Alessandro Martolini (ITA), Chris Dodds (GBR), Alexandru Olaru (ROU)

25 February 2018	Macedonia	87–74	Slovakia	Skopje
19:00	Scoring by quarter: 25–21, 27–16, 18–20, 17–17
	Pts: Hendrix 23; Rebs: Hendrix 13; Asts: V. Stojanovski 7	Boxscore	Pts: Körner, Kuric 17; Rebs: Sedmák 5 Asts: Hlivák 7	Arena: Jane Sandanski Arena; Attendance: 2,100; Referees: Marko Vučkovič (SLO), Alexandru Olaru (ROU), Vladimir Tsekov (BUL)

28 June 2018	Switzerland	85–79	Macedonia	Fribourg
18:30	Scoring by quarter: 26–19, 21–23, 19–22, 19–15
	Pts: Savoy 19; Rebs: Baldassarre 13; Asts: Baldassarre 6	Boxscore	Pts: V. Stojanovski 24; Rebs: Whittington, Trajkovski 6 Asts: Trajkovski 4	Arena: Site Sportif Saint-Léonard; Referees: Sergey Krug (RUS), Serkan Emlek (TUR), Anton Makhlin (RUS)

1 July 2018	Slovakia	88–83	Switzerland	Bratislava
18:00	Scoring by quarter: 20–16, 19–15, 22–23, 27–29
	Pts: Jones 22; Rebs: Lošonský 8 Asts: Ihring, Jones 7	Boxscore	Pts: Baldassarre 30; Rebs: Baldassarre 9 Asts: Kazadi-Muyombu, Zinn 4	Arena: HANT aréna Referees: Tamás Benczur (HUN), Alin Faur (ROU), Charalampos Karakatsounis (GRE)

==== Group B ====
Pos	Team	Pld	W	L	PF	PA	PD	Pts	Qualification
1	Denmark	4	4	0	336	282	+54	8	Second round
2	Armenia	4	2	2	299	296	+3	6	Withdrew after first round
3	Albania	4	0	4	275	332	−57	4	Third round

Source: FIBA
Rules for classification: 1) Classification points; 2) Classification points head-to-head; 3) Game points difference head-to-head; 4) Game points scored head-to-head; 5) Game points difference in group; 6) Game points difference in group

23 November 2017	Albania	63–80	Armenia	Tirana
17:30	Scoring by quarter: 18–28, 20–14, 16–23, 9–15
	Pts: Ndoja 18; Rebs: Pullazi 11; Asts: Bushati, Topalli 3	Boxscore	Pts: Boatright 21; Rebs: Fischer 16; Asts: Boatright 14	Arena: Tirana Olympic Park; Attendance: 400; Referees: Manuel Mazzoni (ITA), Alessandro Martolini (ITA), Nikolaos Somos (GRE)

26 November 2017	Armenia	71–78(OT)	Denmark	Yerevan
19:00	Scoring by quarter: 19–18, 21–13, 11–17, 18–21, Overtime: 2–9
	Pts: Boatright 28; Rebs: Fischer 16; Asts: Boatright 5	Boxscore	Pts: Lundberg 21; Rebs: Colman 9 Asts: Lundberg 5	Arena: Mika Sports Arena; Attendance: 1,000; Referees: Borys Shulga (UKR), Serkan Emlek (TUR), Goran Sljivić (AUT)

22 February 2018	Denmark	82–69	Albania	Næstved
18:15	Scoring by quarter: 25–17, 18–21, 24–14, 15–17
	Pts: Lundberg 28; Rebs: Lundberg 10; Asts: Colman 5	Boxscore	Pts: Ndoja 29; Rebs: Hysenagolli 7 Asts: Dusha 5	Arena: Næstved Arena; Referees: Sigmundur Herbertsson (ISL), Juris Kokainis (LAT), Nikola Perlić (CRO)

25 February 2018	Armenia	84–65	Albania	Yerevan
16:00	Scoring by quarter: 22–20, 19–10, 24–21, 19–14
	Pts: Hess 21; Rebs: Fischer 18; Asts: Abramian, Chrabascz 5	Boxscore	Pts: Ndoja 19; Rebs: Shima 6 Asts: Dusha 6	Arena: Mika Sports Arena; Attendance: 350; Referees: Sergey Krug (RUS), Ofer Manheim (ISR), Ilya Putenko (RUS)

28 June 2018	Denmark	90–64	Armenia	Copenhagen
18:00	Scoring by quarter: 22–16, 18–26, 28–12, 22–10
	Pts: Larsen 19; Rebs: Larsen 13; Asts: Colman 9	Boxscore	Pts: Hess 20; Rebs: Chrabascz 7 Asts: Fischer 4	Arena: Ballerup Super Arena; Referees: Ivan Miličević (BIH), Martynas Gudas (LTU), Marko Vučkovič (SLO)

1 July 2018	Albania	78–86	Denmark	Tirana
19:00	Scoring by quarter: 21–29, 18–19, 25–17, 14–21
	Pts: Pullazi, Shima 15; Rebs: Pullazi 9 Asts: Moore 4	Boxscore	Pts: Jukić 23; Rebs: Bergstedt 7 Asts: Lundberg 7	Arena: Tirana Olympic Park; Attendance: 100; Referees: Zoran Mitrovski (MKD), Alakbar Hasanov (AZE), Milosav Kaluđerović (MNE)

==== Group C ====
Pos	Team	Pld	W	L	PF	PA	PD	Pts	Qualification
1	Portugal	4	3	1	314	276	+38	7	Second round
2	Cyprus	4	2	2	276	285	−9	6	Second round
3	Luxembourg	4	1	3	285	314	−29	5	Third round

Source: FIBA
Rules for classification: 1) Classification points; 2) Classification points head-to-head; 3) Game points difference head-to-head; 4) Game points scored head-to-head; 5) Game points difference in group; 6) Game points difference in group

23 November 2017	Cyprus	69–67	Portugal	Nicosia
18:00	Scoring by quarter: 19–16, 22–26, 21–9, 7–16
	Pts: Kounas 20; Rebs: three players 4 Asts: Panteli 3	Boxscore	Pts: Gomes 23; Rebs: Gomes 11; Asts: Barroso 3	Arena: Eleftheria Indoor Hall; Attendance: 4,000; Referees: Aleksandar Milojević (MKD), Erez Gurion (ISR), Alexandru Olaru (ROU)

26 November 2017	Portugal	91–85(OT)	Luxembourg	Almada
17:00	Scoring by quarter: 12–28, 12–19, 24–12, 23–12, Overtime: 20–14
	Pts: Barroso 26; Rebs: Gomes 11; Asts: Barbosa 6	Boxscore	Pts: Melcher 14; Rebs: Grün 10; Asts: Grün 9	Arena: Complexo de Desportos Cidade de Almada; Attendance: 1,500; Referees: Yohan Rosso (FRA), Ivor Matějek (CZE), Zdenko Tomašovič (SVK)

22 February 2018	Luxembourg	53–67	Cyprus	Luxembourg City
20:30	Scoring by quarter: 8–23, 26–21, 8–11, 11–12
	Pts: Schumacher 16; Rebs: Gindt, Laurent 2 Asts: Vujakovic 5	Boxscore	Pts: Sizopoulos 26; Rebs: Michail, Sizopoulos 2 Asts: five players 3	Arena: d'Coque; Attendance: 500; Referees: Mart Uuehendrik (EST), Christoph Rohacky (AUT), Paul Walton (GBR)

25 February 2018	Portugal	76–64	Cyprus	Sines
17:00	Scoring by quarter: 20–16, 21–17, 12–11, 23–20
	Pts: Barroso 18; Rebs: Gomes 12; Asts: Gomes, Oliveira 3	Boxscore	Pts: Kounas 16; Rebs: King 12; Asts: King, Michail 3	Arena: Pavilhão dos Desportos de Sines; Referees: Alfred Jovović (CRO), Gellért Kapitány (HUN), Vincent Delestrée (BEL)

28 June 2018	Luxembourg	58–80	Portugal	Luxembourg City
20:30	Scoring by quarter: 11–27, 19–21, 17–8, 11–24
	Pts: Vujaković 13; Rebs: Vujaković 9 Asts: Melcher 4	Boxscore	Pts: Barroso 17; Rebs: Gomes 12; Asts: Barbosa 7	Arena: d'Coque; Attendance: 550; Referees: Sigmundur Herbertsson (ISL), Anthonie Sinterniklaas (NED), Pavel Fuska (SVK)

1 July 2018	Cyprus	76–89	Luxembourg	Nicosia
19:00	Scoring by quarter: 17–23, 12–22, 25–15, 22–29
	Pts: Stylianou 18; Rebs: Biggs, Theocharides 7 Asts: Kounas 4	Boxscore	Pts: Laurent 29; Rebs: Vujakovic 8 Asts: Melcher 9	Arena: Eleftheria Indoor Hall; Referees: Petar Denkovski (MKD), Sergii Tyslenko (UKR), Tamás Földházi (HUN)

==== Ranking of second-placed teams ====
Pos	Grp	Team	Pld	W	L	PF	PA	PD	Pts	Qualification
1	B	Armenia (Note: Armenia withdrew because of financial concerns.)	4	2	2	299	296	+3	6	Withdrew after the first round
2	C	Cyprus	4	2	2	276	285	−9	6	Second round
3	A	Switzerland	4	2	2	319	330	−11	6	Third round

Source: FIBA
Rules for classification: 1) Classification points; 2) Classification points head-to-head; 3) Game points difference head-to-head; 4) Game points scored head-to-head; 5) Game points difference in group; 6) Game points difference in group

=== Second round ===
The second round was played between 12 teams: the four teams qualified from the first round, and the eight teams eliminated from the first round of the 2019 World Cup qualification.

The teams were divided into four groups of three teams. The groups were set on 16 January 2018 in Freising, Germany. Each group was formed by one team advanced from the previous round and two teams eliminated from the first round of the 2019 World Cup qualification. The four group winners from this stage qualified to the EuroBasket qualifiers while eight remaining teams were transferred to the third round of pre-qualifiers.

Cyprus replaced Armenia, who withdrew, citing financial concerns.

All times are local.

==== Group A ====
Pos	Team	Pld	W	L	PF	PA	PD	Pts	Qualification
1	Sweden	4	2	2	298	282	+16	6	Qualifiers
2	Denmark	4	2	2	327	329	−2	6	Third round
3	Belarus	4	2	2	310	324	−14	6	Third round

Source: FIBA

13 September 2018	Belarus	94–98(OT)	Denmark	Minsk
19:00	Scoring by quarter: 24–24, 20–16, 15–7, 11–23, Overtime: 12–12, 12–16
	Pts: Liutych 22; Rebs: three players 8 Asts: Sitnik 9	Boxscore	Pts: Lundberg 27; Rebs: Shields 9 Asts: Colman 8	Arena: Falcon Club; Attendance: 1,500; Referees: Haris Bijedić (BIH), Pavel Fuska (SVK), Martin Vulić (CRO)

16 September 2018	Denmark	76–72	Sweden	Copenhagen
14:15	Scoring by quarter: 20–28, 19–15, 23–19, 14–10
	Pts: Larsen 24; Rebs: Larsen 11; Asts: Nielsen 3	Boxscore	Pts: Czerapowicz 27; Rebs: Gaddefors 10; Asts: Gaddefors, Håkanson 4	Arena: Ballerup Super Arena; Attendance: 2,500; Referees: Vladimir Jevtović (SRB), Paulo Marques (POR), Tanel Suslov (EST)

29 November 2018	Sweden	87–59	Belarus	Uppsala
19:00	Scoring by quarter: 19–20, 19–9, 26–16, 23–14
	Pts: Håkanson 21; Rebs: three players 6 Asts: Håkanson 6	Boxscore	Pts: Kudrautsau, Saddler 13; Rebs: five players 4 Asts: Saddler 8	Arena: Fyrishov Arena; Attendance: 2,519; Referees: Sébastien Clivaz (SUI), Marek Kúkelčík (SVK), Ville Selkee (FIN)

2 December 2018	Denmark	79–84	Belarus	Næstved
20:00	Scoring by quarter: 15–19, 16–20, 21–19, 27–26
	Pts: Gilling 22; Rebs: Jukić 7 Asts: Colman, Lundberg 3	Boxscore	Pts: Trastsinetski 21; Rebs: Parakhouski 10; Asts: Saddler 5	Arena: Næstved Arena; Attendance: 1,600; Referees: Michał Proc (POL), Mindaugas Večerskis (LTU), Zdenko Tomasović (SVK)

21 February 2019	Sweden	79–74	Denmark	Malmö
18:30	Scoring by quarter: 22–22, 15–15, 20–24, 22–13
	Pts: Löfberg 18; Rebs: Rush 7 Asts: Massamba 6	Boxscore	Pts: Zohore Bergstedt 22; Rebs: Lundberg 10; Asts: Colman 5	Arena: Baltiska hallen Attendance: 3,452; Referees: Marek Maliszewski (POL), Mart Uuehendrik (EST), Gvidas Gedvilas (LTU)

24 February 2019	Belarus	73–60	Sweden	Minsk
17:00	Scoring by quarter: 23–17, 13–13, 23–17, 14–13
	Pts: Parakhouski 15; Rebs: Parakhouski 9 Asts: Saddler 6	Boxscore	Pts: Löfberg 16; Rebs: Gaddefors, Spires 6 Asts: Massamba 7	Arena: Falcon Club; Attendance: 1,500; Referees: Goran Sljivić (AUT), Vladimir Tsekov (BUL), Kristaps Konstantīnovs (LAT)

==== Group B ====
Pos	Team	Pld	W	L	PF	PA	PD	Pts	Qualification
1	Macedonia	4	3	1	297	282	+15	7 (Note: Macedonia 143–141 Romania)	Qualifiers
2	Romania	4	3	1	308	301	+7	7	Third round
3	Kosovo	4	0	4	299	321	−22	4	Third round

Source: FIBA
Notes:

13 September 2018	Kosovo	73–76	Macedonia	Pristina
20:30	Scoring by quarter: 16–20, 13–14, 20–14, 24–28
	Pts: Berisha 32; Rebs: Shoshi 9 Asts: Bamforth 8	Boxscore	Pts: Trajkovski 17; Rebs: Hendrix 12; Asts: Sokolov 5	Arena: Palace of Youth and Sports; Attendance: 2,500; Referees: Lorenzo Baldini (ITA), Mart Uuehendrik (EST), Christoph Rohacky (AUT)

16 September 2018	Macedonia	90–76	Romania	Skopje
18:15	Scoring by quarter: 20–19, 23–16, 24–17, 23–24
	Pts: V. Stojanovski, Trajkovski 21; Rebs: V. Stojanovski 13; Asts: three players 5	Boxscore	Pts: Watson 17; Rebs: Cățe 8 Asts: three players 4	Arena: Boris Trajkovski Sports Center; Attendance: 3,000; Referees: Sergiy Zashchuk (UKR), Zdenko Tomašovič (SVK), Marek Maliszewski (POL)

29 November 2018	Romania	88–83	Kosovo	Oradea
18:00	Scoring by quarter: 14–17, 21–18, 24–18, 29–30
	Pts: Watson 19; Rebs: Olah 9 Asts: Torok, Watson 4	Boxscore	Pts: Shoshi 29; Rebs: Shoshi 18; Asts: Berisha, Mekaj 4	Arena: Arena Antonio Alexe; Attendance: 1,850; Referees: Ventsislav Velikov (BUL), Serkan Emlek (TUR), Sergii Tyslenko (UKR)

2 December 2018	Macedonia	78–68	Kosovo	Gevgelija
17:45	Scoring by quarter: 29–16, 10–19, 22–12, 17–21
	Pts: Trajkovski 23; Rebs: Trajkovski 13; Asts: V. Stojanovski 5	Boxscore	Pts: Berisha 19; Rebs: Shoshi 15; Asts: Berisha 5	Arena: Sports Hall "26th April"; Attendance: 2,000; Referees: Srđan Dožai (CRO), Vladimir Tsekov (BUL), Josip Jurčević (CRO)

21 February 2019	Romania	65–53	Macedonia	Ploiești
18:00	Scoring by quarter: 15–16, 19–13, 12–10, 19–14
	Pts: Cățe, Torok 12; Rebs: Cățe 13; Asts: Watson 8	Boxscore	Pts: D. Stojanovski 13; Rebs: Hendrix 9 Asts: V. Stojanovski 3	Arena: Olimpia Sports Hall; Attendance: 2,567; Referees: Sergey Mikhaylov (RUS), Gellért Kapitány (HUN), Ilias Kounellis (CYP)

24 February 2019	Kosovo	75–79	Romania	Pristina
20:30	Scoring by quarter: 21–14, 17–25, 23–17, 14–23
	Pts: Berisha 22; Rebs: Berisha 8 Asts: Berisha, Kastrati 4	Boxscore	Pts: Watson 23; Rebs: Cățe 10; Asts: Cățe 4	Arena: Palace of Youth and Sports; Attendance: 2,000; Referees: Nikolaos Somos (GRE), Ernad Karović (BIH), Anastasios Manos (GRE)

==== Group C ====
Pos	Team	Pld	W	L	PF	PA	PD	Pts	Qualification
1	Belgium	4	4	0	305	253	+52	8	Qualifiers
2	Iceland	4	1	3	296	316	−20	5 (Note: Iceland 168–147 Portugal)	Third round
3	Portugal	4	1	3	272	304	−32	5	Third round

Source: FIBA
Notes:

13 September 2018	Belgium	66–65	Portugal	Pepinster
20:30	Scoring by quarter: 23–14, 18–12, 15–22, 10–17
	Pts: three players 11; Rebs: Vanwijn 7 Asts: Serron 4	Boxscore	Pts: Gomes 20; Rebs: Soares 7 Asts: Cardoso, Oliveira 4	Arena: Hall du Paire; Attendance: 1,500; Referees: Thomas Bissuel (FRA), Ivan Miličević (BIH), Markos Michaelides (SUI)

16 September 2018	Portugal	80–77	Iceland	Sines
18:30	Scoring by quarter: 14–19, 20–14, 24–14, 22–30
	Pts: Soares 18; Rebs: Soares 11; Asts: Barbosa 3	Boxscore	Pts: Hermannsson 20; Rebs: Bæringsson 8 Asts: Hermannsson 8	Arena: Pavilhão dos Desportos de Sines; Attendance: 1,000; Referees: Sebastien Clivaz (SUI), Alin Faur (ROU), Aleksandar Milojević (MKD)

29 November 2018	Iceland	66–79	Belgium	Reykjavík
19:45	Scoring by quarter: 22–15, 12–28, 16–13, 16–23
	Pts: Bæringsson 14; Rebs: Bæringsson 7 Asts: Stefánsson, Vilhjálmsson 6	Boxscore	Pts: Van Rossom 17; Rebs: Tumba 6 Asts: Van Rossom 4	Arena: Laugardalshöll; Attendance: 975; Referees: Marek Maliszewski (POL), Apostolos Kalpakas (SWE), Nikolaos Somos (GRE)

2 December 2018	Portugal	60–70	Belgium	Albufeira
17:00	Scoring by quarter: 24–18, 17–13, 15–19, 4–20
	Pts: Fonseca 16; Rebs: Fonseca 12; Asts: three players 2	Boxscore	Pts: Van Rossom 17; Rebs: Bako 7 Asts: Van Rossom 4	Arena: Pavilhão Desportivo de Albufeira; Attendance: 1,250; Referees: Siniša Herceg (CRO), Simon Unsworth (GBR), Steve Bittner (GER)

21 February 2019	Iceland	91–67	Portugal	Reykjavík
19:45	Scoring by quarter: 28–17, 22–18, 20–14, 21–18
	Pts: Stefánsson 17; Rebs: Bæringsson 12; Asts: Hermannsson 8	Boxscore	Pts: Barroso 13; Rebs: Monteiro 6 Asts: Djukic 3	Arena: Laugardalshöll; Attendance: 1,900; Referees: Rune Ressel Larsen (DEN), Johannes Sarekoski (FIN), Thomas Bissuel (FRA)

24 February 2019	Belgium	90–62	Iceland	Mons
15:15	Scoring by quarter: 23–22, 20–11, 23–11, 24–18
	Pts: Salumu 15; Rebs: three players 6 Asts: Boukichou 6	Boxscore	Pts: Hlinason 17; Rebs: Hlinason 7 Asts: Friðriksson, Hermannsson 4	Arena: Mons.Arena; Attendance: 1,642; Referees: Aleksandar Milojević (MKD), Ventsislav Velikov (BUL), Ville Selkee (FIN)

==== Group D ====
Pos	Team	Pld	W	L	PF	PA	PD	Pts	Qualification
1	Austria	4	3	1	324	300	+24	7 (Note: Austria 171–160 Great Britain)	Qualifiers
2	Great Britain	4	3	1	319	279	+40	7	Third round
3	Cyprus	4	0	4	248	312	−64	4	Third round

Source: FIBA
Notes:

13 September 2018	Austria	72–69(OT)	Cyprus	Schwechat
18:00	Scoring by quarter: 16–17, 4–12, 23–15, 15–14, Overtime: 14–11
	Pts: Murati 17; Rebs: Ogunsipe 8 Asts: Schreiner 9	Boxscore	Pts: Michail 16; Rebs: King 8 Asts: Michail 4	Arena: Multiversum; Attendance: 450; Referees: Ivor Matějek (CZE), Tomislav Vovk (CRO), Marko Vučkovič (SLO)

29 November 2018	Great Britain	82–96	Austria	Manchester
19:00	Scoring by quarter: 26–26, 16–34, 17–17, 23–19
	Pts: Hesson 18; Rebs: Clark 7 Asts: Clark 6	Boxscore	Pts: Landesberg 49; Rebs: Landesberg 10; Asts: Landesberg, Schreiner 5	Arena: Belle Vue Sports Village; Attendance: 1,100; Referees: Tamás Benczur (HUN), Rune Larsen (DEN), David Caballe (IRL)

2 December 2018	Cyprus	71–81	Austria	Nicosia
16:00	Scoring by quarter: 21–20, 13–17, 16–24, 21–20
	Pts: Stylianou 19; Rebs: Biggs 6 Asts: Razis 5	Boxscore	Pts: Klepeisz 21; Rebs: Rados 9 Asts: Lanegger 6	Arena: Eleftheria Indoor Hall; Attendance: 1,500; Referees: Aleksandar Milojević (MKD), Alin Faur (ROU), Bernard Vassallo (MLT)

3 December 2018	Cyprus	61–75	Great Britain	Nicosia
19:00	Scoring by quarter: 20–16, 14–21, 10–19, 17–19
	Pts: Biggs 16; Rebs: Michail 8 Asts: Michail, Sizopoulos 3	Boxscore	Pts: Hesson 21; Rebs: Clark 9 Asts: Okereafor 6	Arena: Eleftheria Indoor Hall; Attendance: 600; Referees: Ciprian Stoica (ROU), Ofer Manheim (ISR), Ilya Putenko (RUS)

21 February 2019	Great Britain	84–47	Cyprus	Manchester
19:00	Scoring by quarter: 28–16, 17–8, 17–15, 22–8
	Pts: Hesson 18; Rebs: Olaseni 13; Asts: Soko 4	Boxscore	Pts: Biggs, Sizopoulos 11; Rebs: Sizopoulos 5 Asts: Razis 4	Arena: Belle Vue Sports Village; Attendance: 1,483; Referees: Francisco Araña (ESP), Geert Jacobs (BEL), Gatis Saliņš (LAT)

24 February 2019	Austria	75–78	Great Britain	Schwechat
17:00	Scoring by quarter: 27–19, 21–25, 12–18, 15–16
	Pts: Landesberg 26; Rebs: Ogunsipe 12; Asts: Landesberg 7	Boxscore	Pts: Soko 19; Rebs: Hesson, Soko 9 Asts: Clark 4	Arena: Multiversum; Attendance: 1,300; Referees: Siniša Herceg (CRO), Blaž Zupančič (SLO), Martin Vulić (CRO)

=== Third round ===
The third round was played in the August 2019. It was joined by the four teams eliminated in the first round and the eight teams that played the second round and did not advance to the EuroBasket qualifiers. Those twelve teams were placed into four groups with three teams each. Every single group was formed by one team eliminated in the first round, one runner-up from the second round and one third-placed finisher from the second round. The group winners from this round advanced to the EuroBasket qualifiers, while the eight remaining teams transferred to the 2023 World Cup pre-qualifiers.

All times are local.

==== Group E ====
Pos	Team	Pld	W	L	PF	PA	PD	Pts	Qualification
1	Denmark	4	4	0	313	274	+39	8	Qualifiers
2	Belarus	4	2	2	314	267	+47	6	
3	Albania	4	0	4	247	333	−86	4	

Source: FIBA

3 August 2019	Albania	51–73	Belarus	Tirana
19:00	Scoring by quarter: 17–19, 19–22, 5–18, 10–14
	Pts: Moore 16; Rebs: Hysenagolli 9 Asts: Moore 5	Boxscore	Pts: Salash 16; Rebs: Parakhouski, Salash 10; Asts: Rubinshteyn 4	Arena: Tirana Olympic Park; Attendance: 150; Referees: Marius Ciulin (ROU), Radomir Vojinović (MNE), Zdenko Tomašovič (SVK)

7 August 2019	Belarus	78–81	Denmark	Minsk
19:00	Scoring by quarter: 15–27, 26–17, 14–19, 23–18
	Pts: Wayns 15; Rebs: Parakhouski 8 Asts: Rubinshteyn 6	Boxscore	Pts: Lundberg 30; Rebs: Hertz 7 Asts: three players 4	Arena: Falcon Club; Attendance: 1,500; Referees: Ademir Zurapović (BIH), Janusz Calik (POL), Saša Maričić (SRB)

10 August 2019	Denmark	95–73	Albania	Copenhagen
15:30	Scoring by quarter: 22–22, 23–14, 23–17, 27–20
	Pts: Lundberg 23; Rebs: Lundberg 10; Asts: Hertz 5	Boxscore	Pts: Hysenagolli 23; Rebs: Shima 6 Asts: Shestani 4	Arena: Ballerup Super Arena; Referees: Yohan Rosso (FRA), Georgios Poursanidis (GRE), Wojciech Liszka (POL)

14 August 2019	Belarus	97–66	Albania	Minsk
19:00	Scoring by quarter: 31–14, 19–13, 21–15, 26–24
	Pts: Salash 21; Rebs: Rubinshteyn 10; Asts: Vabishchevich 7	Boxscore	Pts: Moore 16; Rebs: Hysenagolli 5 Asts: Strazimiri 5	Arena: Falcon Club; Attendance: 800; Referees: Sergiy Zashchuk (UKR), Andris Aunkrogers (LAT), Özlem Yalman (TUR)

17 August 2019	Denmark	69–66	Belarus	Copenhagen
15:30	Scoring by quarter: 7–17, 18–20, 22–15, 22–14
	Pts: Lundberg 27; Rebs: Gilling 8 Asts: Larsen, Lundberg 3	Boxscore	Pts: Salash 17; Rebs: Parakhouski 9 Asts: Trastsinetski 5	Arena: Ballerup Super Arena; Referees: Aleksandar Glišić (SRB), Petar Denkovski (MKD), Martin Horozov (BUL)

21 August 2019	Albania	57–68	Denmark	Tirana
19:00	Scoring by quarter: 16–20, 17–14, 6–19
	Pts: Moore 16; Rebs: Hysenagolli 9 Asts: Lekndreaj 4	Boxscore	Pts: Bergstedt 12; Rebs: Christensen, Rungby 7 Asts: Nielsen, Bergstedt 3	Arena: Tirana Olympic Park; Attendance: 150; Referees: Siniša Herceg (CRO), Igor Mitrovski (MKD), Alin Faur (ROU)

==== Group F ====
Pos	Team	Pld	W	L	PF	PA	PD	Pts	Qualification
1	Romania	4	4	0	336	275	+61	8	Qualifiers
2	Slovakia	4	2	2	292	301	−9	6	
3	Cyprus	4	0	4	272	324	−52	4	

Source: FIBA

3 August 2019	Slovakia	67–60	Cyprus	Bratislava
18:00	Scoring by quarter: 19–13, 17–26, 18–14, 13–7
	Pts: Brodziansky 23; Rebs: Brodziansky 12; Asts: Ihring 5	Boxscore	Pts: Razis 12; Rebs: Koumis 6 Asts: Michail 6	Arena: Eurovia Aréna; Attendance: 1,053; Referees: Ademir Zurapović (BIH), Janusz Calik (POL), Andrei Sharapa (BLR)

7 August 2019	Cyprus	70–85	Romania	Nicosia
19:00	Scoring by quarter: 11–27, 29–17, 13–25, 17–16
	Pts: Markou, Razis 17; Rebs: Loizides 5 Asts: Michail 8	Boxscore	Pts: Cățe 19; Rebs: Cățe 10; Asts: Tohatan 3	Arena: Eleftheria Indoor Hall; Attendance: 400; Referees: Saverio Lanzarini (ITA), Martin Horozov (BUL), Andris Aunkrogers (LAT)

10 August 2019	Romania	85–68	Slovakia	Ploiești
19:00	Scoring by quarter: 26–9, 24–23, 14–22, 21–14
	Pts: Watson 19; Rebs: Cățe 15; Asts: Watson 6	Boxscore	Pts: Brodziansky 17; Rebs: Brodziansky 9 Asts: Ihring 4	Arena: Olimpia Sports Hall; Attendance: 1,001; Referees: Aleksandar Glišić (SRB), Saša Maričić (SRB), Luis Castillo (ESP)

14 August 2019	Cyprus	79–83	Slovakia	Nicosia
19:00	Scoring by quarter: 19–22, 19–15, 20–18, 21–28
	Pts: Markou 21; Rebs: Loizides, Stavrinides 4 Asts: Michail 7	Boxscore	Pts: Baťka, Brodziansky 13; Rebs: Brodziansky 11; Asts: Brodziansky 6	Arena: Eleftheria Indoor Hall; Attendance: 500; Referees: Gentian Cici (ALB), Tomas Jasevičius (LTU), Thomas Bissuel (FRA)

17 August 2019	Romania	89–63	Cyprus	Ploiești
18:00	Scoring by quarter: 27–18, 21–12, 21–19, 20–14
	Pts: Popa 22; Rebs: Cățe 15; Asts: Watson 6	Boxscore	Pts: Michail 19; Rebs: Koumis 9 Asts: Razis 7	Arena: Olimpia Sports Hall; Attendance: 1,000; Referees: Sergiy Zashchuk (UKR), Erez Gurion (ISR), Stanislav Valeev (RUS)

21 August 2019	Slovakia	74–77	Romania	Bratislava
18:00	Scoring by quarter: 23–19, 9–28, 20–13, 22–17
	Pts: Jones 25; Rebs: Fusek 9 Asts: three players 3	Boxscore	Pts: Popa 14; Rebs: Cățe 9 Asts: Watson 7	Arena: Eurovia Aréna; Attendance: 1,817; Referees: Tanel Suslov (EST), Andrei Sharapa (BLR), Sergei Beliakov (RUS)

==== Group G ====
Pos	Team	Pld	W	L	PF	PA	PD	Pts	Qualification
1	Great Britain	4	4	0	336	261	+75	8	Qualifiers
2	Kosovo	4	1	3	331	348	−17	5 (Note: Kosovo 189–176 Luxembourg)	
3	Luxembourg	4	1	3	295	353	−58	5	

Source: FIBA
Notes:

3 August 2019	Luxembourg	88–80	Kosovo	Luxembourg City
19:00	Scoring by quarter: 23–21, 24–25, 19–18, 22–16
	Pts: Laurent 22; Rebs: Vujakovic 9 Asts: Vujakovic 5	Boxscore	Pts: Berisha 23; Rebs: Myles 6 Asts: four players 4	Arena: d'Coque; Attendance: 350; Referees: Siniša Herceg (CRO), Yohan Rosso (FRA), Martin Vulić (CRO)

7 August 2019	Kosovo	63–71	Great Britain	Mitrovica
20:30	Scoring by quarter: 10–15, 17–13, 19–22, 17–21
	Pts: Hajrizi 17; Rebs: Hajrizi 9 Asts: Berisha 5	Boxscore	Pts: Olaseni 15; Rebs: Olaseni 13; Asts: Okereafor 7	Arena: Minatori Sports Hall; Attendance: 2,500; Referees: Yener Yılmaz (TUR), Gentian Cici (ALB), Boris Krejič (SLO)

10 August 2019	Great Britain	71–54	Luxembourg	Manchester
19:00	Scoring by quarter: 22–15, 10–18, 16–21, 23–2
	Pts: Hesson 22; Rebs: Olaseni 13; Asts: Okereafor 4	Boxscore	Pts: Laurent 14; Rebs: Laurent 11; Asts: Grün 8	Arena: Belle Vue Sports Village; Attendance: 402; Referees: Antonio Conde (ESP), Yener Yılmaz (TUR), Marek Kúkelčík (SVK)

14 August 2019	Kosovo	109–88	Luxembourg	Pristina
20:30	Scoring by quarter: 30–17, 17–20, 30–25, 32–26
	Pts: Berisha 32; Rebs: Kastrati, Rugova 5 Asts: Berisha 8	Boxscore	Pts: Vujakovic 19; Rebs: Laurent 11; Asts: Grün 8	Arena: Palace of Youth and Sports; Attendance: 1,500; Referees: Georgios Poursanidis (GRE), Martin Horozov (BUL), Gellért Kapitány (HUN)

17 August 2019	Great Britain	101–79	Kosovo	Manchester
19:00	Scoring by quarter: 24–12, 30–20, 24–23, 23–24
	Pts: Hesson, Nelson 19; Rebs: Hesson 9 Asts: Hesson 10	Boxscore	Pts: Hajrizi 22; Rebs: Berisha, Hajrizi 5 Asts: Berisha 11	Arena: Belle Vue Sports Village; Attendance: 1,256; Referees: Tomas Jasevičius (LTU), Kristaps Konstantīnovs (LAT), Gintaras Vitkauskas (LTU)

21 August 2019	Luxembourg	65–93	Great Britain	Luxembourg City
19:00	Scoring by quarter: 10–24, 14–26, 18–27, 23–16
	Pts: Grün 23; Rebs: Francois 7 Asts: Gutenkauf 4	Boxscore	Pts: Nelson 17; Rebs: Hesson 9 Asts: Hesson 4	Arena: d'Coque; Attendance: 850; Referees: Srđan Dožai (CRO), Fernando Calatrava (ESP), Geert Jacobs (BEL)

==== Group H ====
Pos	Team	Pld	W	L	PF	PA	PD	Pts	Qualification
1	Switzerland	4	2	2	336	324	+12	6	Qualifiers
2	Iceland	4	2	2	343	339	+4	6	
3	Portugal	4	2	2	304	320	−16	6	

Source: FIBA

3 August 2019	Switzerland	77–72	Portugal	Fribourg
19:00	Scoring by quarter: 16–19, 20–17, 20–24, 21–12
	Pts: Mlađan 21; Rebs: Capela 11; Asts: Kazadi 7	Boxscore	Pts: Guerreiro 17; Rebs: Wilson 11; Asts: Lima 3	Arena: BCF Arena; Attendance: 3,225; Referees: Antonio Conde (ESP), Ilias Kounelles (CYP), Fernando Calatrava (ESP)

7 August 2019	Portugal	80–79	Iceland	Sines
18:30	Scoring by quarter: 27–23, 16–18, 22–17, 15–21
	Pts: Wilson 20; Rebs: Fonseca, Grosso 5 Asts: Cardoso 4	Boxscore	Pts: Hermannsson 28; Rebs: Bæringsson, Hlinason 8 Asts: Hermannsson 5	Arena: Pavilhão dos Desportos de Sines; Attendance: 200; Referees: Yohan Rosso (FRA), Manuel Mazzoni (ITA), Wojciech Liszka (POL)

10 August 2019	Iceland	83–82	Switzerland	Reykjavík
13:00	Scoring by quarter: 19–25, 20–18, 19–19, 25–20
	Pts: Guðmundsson, Hlinason 18; Rebs: Ermolinskij 8 Asts: Vilhjálmsson 6	Boxscore	Pts: Kazadi 23; Rebs: Baldassarre 9 Asts: Capela, Kovac 5	Arena: Laugardalshöll; Attendance: 1,250; Referees: Srđan Dožai (CRO), Michał Proc (POL), Petar Denkovski (MKD)

14 August 2019	Portugal	84–68	Switzerland	Sines
18:30	Scoring by quarter: 24–17, 21–23, 19–14, 20–14
	Pts: three players 16; Rebs: Wilson 7 Asts: Cardoso 8	Boxscore	Pts: Capela 13; Rebs: Capela 11; Asts: Kazadi-Muyombu 4	Arena: Pavilhão dos Desportos de Sines; Attendance: 500; Referees: Ademir Zurapović (BIH), Saša Maričić (SRB), Gintaras Vitkauskas (LTU)

17 August 2019	Iceland	96–68	Portugal	Reykjavík
16:00	Scoring by quarter: 23–13, 21–17, 29–15, 23–23
	Pts: Bæringsson 21; Rebs: Ermolinskij 11; Asts: Ermolinskij, Friðriksson 8	Boxscore	Pts: Fonseca 12; Rebs: Wilson 5 Asts: Cardoso 5	Arena: Laugardalshöll; Attendance: 1,850; Referees: Andris Aunkrogers (LAT), Gentian Cici (ALB), Thomas Bissuel (FRA)

21 August 2019	Switzerland	109–85	Iceland	Montreux
19:00	Scoring by quarter: 25–29, 29–18, 23–19, 32–19
	Pts: Kovac 29; Rebs: Capela 15; Asts: Kazadi-Muyombu 9	Boxscore	Pts: Hermannsson 28; Rebs: Guðmundsson 8 Asts: Ermolinskij 6	Arena: Salle omnisports du Pierrier; Attendance: 2,000; Referees: Yohan Rosso (FRA), Alexey Davydov (RUS), Gatis Saliņš (LAT)

== Qualifiers ==
The draw was held on 22 July 2019 in Munich, Germany. The four group winners from the second round of the pre-qualifiers; plus the four group winners from the third round of the pre-qualifiers and also the 24 teams who participated in the second round of the FIBA Basketball World Cup qualification all participated in this stage. These matches were played in three windows from 17 to 25 February 2020; from 23 November to 1 December 2020 and from 15 to 23 February 2021 with two games played by each team in every window.

The 32 countries played the FIBA EuroBasket 2022 Qualifiers, including the hosts of the final round – Czech Republic, Georgia, Germany, and Italy. The teams were drawn into eight groups of four teams. The groups were conducted in a round-robin system, with each team playing all other teams in the respective group in home and away games. The three highest-placed teams from each group, except the groups which include the FIBA EuroBasket 2022 hosts, qualified for the FIBA EuroBasket 2022. For the groups containing the FIBA EuroBasket 2022 hosts, the host and the two other highest placed teams qualified for the FIBA EuroBasket 2022.

The eight teams which failed to qualify for the final tournament played the second round of the World Cup 2023 pre-qualifiers in the summer of 2021.

=== Seeding ===
The seeding was based on the FIBA World Rankings of 26 February 2019, except seed 8, where teams qualified from the third round of the pre-qualifiers were allocated. On 19 July 2019, the seeding was revealed. In bold, teams that host the final stage. In italics, teams qualified from the pre-qualifiers.

Teams from seed 1 were drawn into the groups A, C, E and G with teams from seeds 4, 5 and 8. Teams from seed 2 were drawn into the groups B, D, F and H with teams from seeds 3, 6 and 7. Only one host of the final stage could be drawn in any group.

Seed 1
Team	Pos
Spain	2
France	3
Serbia	4
Lithuania	6

Seed 2
Team	Pos
Slovenia	7
Greece	8
Croatia	9
Russia	10

Seed 3
Team	Pos
**Italy**	13
Latvia	15
Turkey	17
Ukraine	19

Seed 4
Team	Pos
Finland	21
**Germany**	22
**Czech Republic**	24
Poland	25

Seed 5
Team	Pos
**Georgia**	26
Montenegro	28
Belgium	29
Israel	35

Seed 6
Team	Pos
Hungary	36
Bosnia and Herzegovina	40
Netherlands	41
North Macedonia	42

Seed 7
Team	Pos
Estonia	45
Bulgaria	47
Sweden	54
Austria	55

Seed 8
Team	Pos
Denmark	69
Romania	61
Great Britain	44
Switzerland	65

Due to the COVID-19 pandemic, each group played the November 2020 window games at a single venue. The same was done for the February 2021 games.

All times are local.

=== Group A ===
Pos	Team	Pld	W	L	PF	PA	PD	Pts	Qualification
1	Israel	6	5	1	487	442	+45	**11**	EuroBasket 2022
2	Spain	6	4	2	501	448	+53	**10**	EuroBasket 2022
3	Poland	6	3	3	490	453	+37	**9**	EuroBasket 2022
4	Romania	6	0	6	388	523	−135	**6**	

Source: FIBA
Rules for classification: 1) Points; 2) Head-to-head; 3) Points difference; 4) Points scored.

20 February 2020	Romania	71–**84**	**Spain**	Cluj-Napoca
18:00	Scoring by quarter: 18–**21**, 16–**23**, 19–**20**, 18–**20**
	Pts: Cățe 19; Rebs: Cățe 13; Asts: Richard 4	Boxscore	Pts: Díez 21; Rebs: Saiz 10; Asts: Alocén 9	Arena: BT Arena; Attendance: 6,000; Referees: Oskars Lūsis (LAT), Apostolos Kalpakas (SWE), Alexey Davydov (RUS)

20 February 2020	Poland	71–**75**	**Israel**	Gliwice
18:45	Scoring by quarter: 12–**21**, **27**–16, 14–**18**, 18–**20**
	Pts: Slaughter 29; Rebs: Michalak 11; Asts: Slaughter 4	Boxscore	Pts: Zalmanson 12; Rebs: Segev 8 Asts: Mekel 10	Arena: Gliwice Arena; Attendance: 11,000; Referees: Aleksandar Glišić (SRB), Alexandre Deman (FRA), Thomas Bissuel (FRA)

23 February 2020	Spain	69–**80**	**Poland**	Zaragoza
18:00	Scoring by quarter: **19**–15, 16–**23**, 20–**27**, 14–**15**
	Pts: Díez 16; Rebs: Saiz 12; Asts: Alocén 9	Boxscore	Pts: Slaughter 26; Rebs: Kulig 6 Asts: Koszarek 7	Arena: Pabellón Príncipe Felipe; Attendance: 8,661; Referees: Yener Yılmaz (TUR), Martin Vulić (CRO), Zdenko Tomašovič (SVK)

24 February 2020	**Israel**	**87**–63	Romania	Tel Aviv
19:00	Scoring by quarter: **16**–12, **27**–26, **22**–18, **22**–7
	Pts: Avdija 21; Rebs: Avdija 8 Asts: Blatt 7	Boxscore	Pts: Dragoste 11; Rebs: Cățe 10; Asts: Watson 5	Arena: Drive in Arena; Referees: Tolga Sahin (ITA), Kerem Baki (TUR), Vladimir Jevtović (SRB)

28 November 2020	Romania	61–**91**	**Poland**	Valencia, Spain
16:30	Scoring by quarter: 7–**24**, 17–**21**, 23–**26**, 14–**20**
	Pts: Richard 14; Rebs: Cățe 10; Asts: Richard 4	Boxscore	Pts: Sokołowski 17; Rebs: Cel, Sokołowski 7 Asts: Kolenda, Koszarek 4	Arena: Pavelló Municipal Font de Sant Lluís; Referees: Radomir Vojinović (MNE), Goran Šljivić (AUT), Ilias Kounelles (CYP)

28 November 2020	**Israel**	**95**–87	Spain	Valencia, Spain
19:30	Scoring by quarter: 21–**27**, 15–**25**, **31**–20, **28**–15
	Pts: Blatt 21; Rebs: Ginat 5 Asts: Blatt 9	Boxscore	Pts: Colom 24; Rebs: López-Arostegui, Pérez 6 Asts: Colom 5	Arena: Pavelló Municipal Font de Sant Lluís; Referees: Andrei Sharapa (BLR), Martin Vulić (CRO), Vladimir Jevtović (SRB)

30 November 2020	**Israel**	**78**–72	Poland	Valencia, Spain
16:30	Scoring by quarter: 16–**18**, **25**–14, **21**–20, 16–**20**
	Pts: Cohen 14; Rebs: Ginat 8 Asts: Blatt 8	Boxscore	Pts: Ponitka 23; Rebs: Cel 7 Asts: Koszarek 5	Arena: Pavelló Municipal Font de Sant Lluís; Referees: Andrei Sharapa (BLR), Martin Vulić (CRO), Vladimir Jevtović (SRB)

30 November 2020	**Spain**	**94**–41	Romania	Valencia
19:30	Scoring by quarter: **27**–12, **18**–9, **13**–12, **36**–8
	Pts: Brizuela 17; Rebs: Guerrero 12; Asts: Brizuela 5	Boxscore	Pts: Tohătan 13; Rebs: Cățe 7 Asts: five players 1	Arena: Pavelló Municipal Font de Sant Lluís; Referees: Radomir Vojinović (MNE), Goran Šljivić (AUT), Blaž Zupančič (SLO)

19 February 2021	Romania	71–**79**	**Israel**	Gliwice, Poland
17:30	Scoring by quarter: 17–**22**, 14–**23**, **18**–17, **22**–17
	Pts: Maciuca 18; Rebs: Popa 8 Asts: Badiu 8	Boxscore	Pts: Sorkin 18; Rebs: Weisz 5 Asts: Blatt 7	Arena: Gliwice Arena; Referees: Igor Mitrovski (MKD), Boris Krejić (SLO), Geert Jacobs (BEL)

19 February 2021	Poland	88–**89**	**Spain**	Gliwice
20:30	Scoring by quarter: **27**–26, 16–**17**, 22–**27**, **23**–19
	Pts: Slaughter 27; Rebs: Cel, Waczyński 5 Asts: three players 3	Boxscore	Pts: Barreiro 24; Rebs: Barreiro, Guerra 5 Asts: Guerra 5	Arena: Gliwice Arena; Referees: Aleksandar Glišić (SRB), Zdravko Rutešić (MNE), Andris Aunkrogers (LAT)

21 February 2021	**Spain**	**78**–73	Israel	Gliwice, Poland
17:30	Scoring by quarter: **19**–13, **23**–18, 17–**27**, **19**–15
	Pts: Brizuela 18; Rebs: Barreiro, Parra 9 Asts: Bassas 7	Boxscore	Pts: Cohen 20; Rebs: Cohen 8 Asts: Blatt 9	Arena: Gliwice Arena; Referees: Igor Mitrosvki (MKD), Andris Aunkrogers (LAT), Zdravko Rutešić (MNE)

21 February 2021	**Poland**	**88**–81	Romania	Gliwice
20:30	Scoring by quarter: **34**–26, 16–**21**, **25**–16, 13–**18**
	Pts: Michalak 24; Rebs: Olejniczak 6 Asts: Ponitka 5	Boxscore	Pts: Maciuca 16; Rebs: Uta 9 Asts: Gheorghe 6	Arena: Gliwice Arena; Referees: Aleksandar Glišić (SRB), Geert Jacobs (BEL), Mehmet Şahin (TUR)

=== Group B ===
Pos	Team	Pld	W	L	PF	PA	PD	Pts	Qualification
1	Italy	6	4	2	511	487	+24	**10 (Note: Italy 153–130 Russia)**	EuroBasket 2022 as host
2	Russia (Note: On 20 May 2022, FIBA suspended Russia from international competitions due to the 2022 Russian invasion of Ukraine.)	6	4	2	460	405	+55	**10**	Disqualified
3	Estonia	6	2	4	459	505	−46	**8 (Note: Estonia 165–158 North Macedonia)**	EuroBasket 2022
4	North Macedonia	6	2	4	473	506	−33	**8**	

Source: FIBA
Rules for classification: 1) Points; 2) Head-to-head; 3) Points difference; 4) Points scored.
Notes:

20 February 2020	North Macedonia	72–**81**	**Estonia**	Skopje
20:15	Scoring by quarter: 18–**20**, 5–**25**, **23**–15, **26**–21
	Pts: V. Stojanovski 26; Rebs: Whittington 8 Asts: Gjuroski, V. Stojanovski 3	Boxscore	Pts: Kullamäe 31; Rebs: Nurger 6 Asts: Kullamäe, Veideman 5	Arena: Boris Trajkovski Sports Center; Attendance: 5,600; Referees: Mārtiņš Kozlovskis (LAT), Mehmet Sahin (TUR), Zdenko Tomašovič (SVK)

20 February 2020	**Italy**	**83**–64	Russia	Naples
20:30	Scoring by quarter: **26**–24, **15**–9, **21**–18, **21**–13
	Pts: Ricci 19; Rebs: Fontecchio, Ricci 7 Asts: Spissu 10	Boxscore	Pts: Kulagin 17; Rebs: Antipov 6 Asts: Kulagin 8	Arena: PalaBarbuto; Attendance: 4,000; Referees: Antonio Conde (ESP), Martin Vulić (CRO), Fernando Calatrava (ESP)

23 February 2020	**Russia**	**77**–67	North Macedonia	Perm
20:00	Scoring by quarter: 19–**20**, **19**–16, **19**–17, **20**–14
	Pts: Fridzon 23; Rebs: Antipov, Fridzon 7 Asts: Kulagin 7	Boxscore	Pts: Magdevski, Whittington 14; Rebs: three players 6 Asts: three players 4	Arena: Molot Sports Hall; Attendance: 7,099; Referees: Oskars Lūsis (LAT), Janusz Calik (POL), Thomas Bissuel (FRA)

23 February 2020	Estonia	81–**87**	**Italy**	Tallinn
19:00	Scoring by quarter: 18–18, **29**–23, 14–**18**, 20–**28**
	Pts: Kitsing 22; Rebs: Jõesaar 9 Asts: Kullamäe 8	Boxscore	Pts: Vitali 22; Rebs: three players 4 Asts: Spissu 8	Arena: Saku Suurhall; Attendance: 5,051; Referees: Aleksandar Glišić (SRB), Martin Horozov (BUL), Andrei Sharapa (BLR)

28 November 2020	Estonia	56–**84**	**Russia**	Tallinn
20:30	Scoring by quarter: 14–**18**, 13–**23**, 15–**21**, 14–**22**
	Pts: Jõesaar 11; Rebs: Treier 7 Asts: Veideman 8	Boxscore	Pts: Baburin 19; Rebs: Vorontsevich 6 Asts: Strebkov 7	Arena: Saku Suurhall; Referees: Mārtiņš Kozlovskis (LAT), Martin Horozov (BUL), Petr Hrůša (CZE)

30 November 2020	Russia	66–**70**	**Italy**	Tallinn, Estonia
16:00	Scoring by quarter: 15-15, 16–**21**, 13–**14**, **22**–20
	Pts: Vorontsevich 11; Rebs: Vorontsevich 11; Asts: three players 4	Boxscore	Pts: Tessitori 27; Rebs: Tessitori 9 Asts: Della Valle, Spissu 5	Arena: Saku Suurhall; Referees: Antonio Conde (ESP), Mārtiņš Kozlovskis (LAT), Dariusz Zapolski (POL)

18 February 2021 (Note: The matches originally scheduled for the November 2020 window were postponed, due to several positive COVID-19 tests by Macedonian players.)	**Italy**	**92**–84	North Macedonia	Perm, Russia
19:30	Scoring by quarter: **25**–23, 16–**20**, **22**–21, **29**–20
	Pts: Tessitori 18; Rebs: Ricci 7 Asts: Spissu 9	Boxscore	Pts: Dimitrijevikj 24; Rebs: Trajkovski 7 Asts: Dimitrijevikj 12	Arena: Molot Sports Hall; Attendance: 1,100; Referees: Tomas Jasevičius (LTU), Yener Yılmaz (TUR), Alexandre Deman (FRA)

19 February 2021	Italy	101–**105**(OT)	**Estonia**	Perm, Russia
16:30	Scoring by quarter: **21**–20, 23–**34**, 22–**28**, **28**–12, Overtime: 7–**11**
	Pts: Vitali 24; Rebs: Vitali 9 Asts: Spissu 6	Boxscore	Pts: Kotsar 32; Rebs: Treier 6 Asts: Sokk 14	Arena: Molot Sports Hall; Attendance: 412; Referees: Yener Yılmaz (TUR), Zdeno Tomašovič (SVK), Gvidas Gedvilas (LTU)

19 February 2021	North Macedonia	77–**94**	**Russia**	Perm, Russia
19:30	Scoring by quarter: 21–**26**, 12–**25**, 21–21, **23**–22
	Pts: V. Stojanovski 18; Rebs: Krstevski 5 Asts: Magdevski, Nikolov 5	Boxscore	Pts: Bolomboy 19; Rebs: Ilnitskiy, Vorontsevich 6 Asts: Kulagin, Strebkov 7	Arena: Molot Sports Hall; Attendance: 1,854; Referees: Tomas Jasevičius (LTU), Zafer Yılmaz (TUR), Carsten Straube (GER)

21 February 2021	**North Macedonia**	**87**–78	Italy	Perm, Russia
17:00	Scoring by quarter: 20–**30**, 21–**22**, **26**–13, **20**–13
	Pts: Dimitrijevikj 22; Rebs: Wiley 7 Asts: Dimitrijevikj 7	Boxscore	Pts: Spissu 17; Rebs: Akele 4 Asts: Spissu 8	Arena: Molot Sports Hall; Attendance: 776; Referees: Yener Yılmaz (TUR), Zdeno Tomašovič (SVK), Alexandre Deman (FRA)

21 February 2021	**Russia**	**75**–52	Estonia	Perm
20:00	Scoring by quarter: **17**–15, **16**–12, **20**–18, **22**–7
	Pts: Baburin 14; Rebs: Ivlev 10; Asts: Vorontsevich 4	Boxscore	Pts: Jõesaar 10; Rebs: Jõesaar, Nurger 5 Asts: Kotsar 4	Arena: Molot Sports Hall; Attendance: 2,852; Referees: Zafer Yılmaz (TUR), Carsten Straube (GER), Steve Bittner (GER)

22 February 2021	Estonia	84–**86**	**North Macedonia**	Perm, Russia
19:00	Scoring by quarter: **27**–18, **22**–20, 20–**25**, 15–**23**
	Pts: Kotsar 15; Rebs: Treier 12; Asts: Sokk 7	Boxscore	Pts: Dimitrijevikj 23; Rebs: Wiley 14; Asts: Dimitrijevikj 5	Arena: Molot Sports Hall; Attendance: 614; Referees: Tomas Jasevičius (LTU), Yener Yılmaz (TUR), Zafer Yılmaz (TUR)

=== Group C ===
Pos	Team	Pld	W	L	PF	PA	PD	Pts	Qualification
1	Belgium	6	4	2	509	439	+70	**10 (Note: Belgium 157–149 Lithuania)**	EuroBasket 2022
2	Lithuania	6	4	2	493	476	+17	**10**	EuroBasket 2022
3	Czech Republic	6	2	4	481	529	−48	**8 (Note: Czech Republic 165–162 Denmark)**	EuroBasket 2022 as host
4	Denmark	6	2	4	455	494	−39	**8**	

Source: FIBA
Rules for classification: 1) Points; 2) Head-to-head; 3) Points difference; 4) Points scored.
Notes:

21 February 2020	**Czech Republic**	**75**–71	Denmark	Pardubice
20:10	Scoring by quarter: 19–**20**, **30**–22, **10**–7, 16–**22**
	Pts: Bohačík 17; Rebs: Kříž 8 Asts: Bohačík 5	Boxscore	Pts: Lundberg 20; Rebs: Lundberg 8 Asts: Darboe 6	Arena: Pardubice Arena; Attendance: 3,820; Referees: Nicolas Maestre (FRA), Zafer Yilmaz (TUR), Beniamino Attard (ITA)

21 February 2020	**Belgium**	**86**–65	Lithuania	Mons
20:30	Scoring by quarter: **23**–9, **17**–12, **28**–10, 18–**34**
	Pts: Obasohan 21; Rebs: De Zeeuw 9 Asts: Serron 5	Boxscore	Pts: Motiejūnas 17; Rebs: Kuzminskas, Motiejūnas 5 Asts: Kalnietis 4	Arena: Mons.Arena; Attendance: 3,100; Referees: Marius Ciulin (ROU), Zdravko Rutešić (MNE), Michał Proc (POL)

24 February 2020	Denmark	72–**88**	**Belgium**	Copenhagen
18:15	Scoring by quarter: 18–**27**, 21–**28**, 13–**23**, **20**–10
	Pts: Larsen 20; Rebs: three players 5 Asts: three players 4	Boxscore	Pts: Tabu 22; Rebs: Tabu 8 Asts: Tabu 7	Arena: Farum Arena; Referees: Saverio Lanzarini (ITA), Radomir Vojinović (MNE), Gatis Saliņš (LAT)

24 February 2020	**Lithuania**	**97**–89	Czech Republic	Vilnius
18:30	Scoring by quarter: 19–**20**, 23–**27**, 20–20, **35**–22
	Pts: Bendžius 26; Rebs: Butkevičius 8 Asts: Jokubaitis 6	Boxscore	Pts: Hruban 26; Rebs: three players 4 Asts: Šiřina 6	Arena: Siemens Arena; Attendance: 6,591; Referees: Eddie Viator (FRA), Saša Maričić (SRB), Alexandre Deman (FRA)

27 November 2020	Czech Republic	62–**90**	**Belgium**	Vilnius, Lithuania
16:30	Scoring by quarter: 19–**27**, 17–**20**, 15–**23**, 11–**20**
	Pts: Balvin 14; Rebs: Peterka 8 Asts: Bohacik 4	Boxscore	Pts: Obasohan 18; Rebs: Gillet, Kesteloot 5 Asts: Obasohan 7	Arena: Siemens Arena; Referees: Aleksandar Glišić (SRB), Mehmet Sahin (TUR), Zdravko Rutešić (MNE)

27 November 2020	Lithuania	76–**80**	**Denmark**	Vilnius
19:30	Scoring by quarter: **22**–21, **24**–17, 13–**22**, 17–**20**
	Pts: Gailius 16; Rebs: Birutis 8 Asts: Kalnietis 6	Boxscore	Pts: Lundberg 28; Rebs: Lundberg 7 Asts: Lundberg 4	Arena: Siemens Arena; Referees: Boris Krejić (SLO), Özlem Yalman (TUR), Pavol Fúska (SVK)

29 November 2020	**Denmark**	**91**–90	Czech Republic	Vilnius, Lithuania
16:30	Scoring by quarter: **29**–21, 22–**27**, 19–**23**, **21**–19
	Pts: Lundberg 38; Rebs: Zohore 10; Asts: Darboe 9	Boxscore	Pts: Peterka 24; Rebs: Peterka 8 Asts: Bohačík, Vyoral 7	Arena: Siemens Arena; Referees: Özlem Yalman (TUR), Zdravko Rutešić (MNE), Mehmet Sahin (TUR)

29 November 2020	**Lithuania**	**84**–71	Belgium	Vilnius
19:30	Scoring by quarter: **20**–15, **29**–21, **18**–15, 17–**20**
	Pts: Bendžius 19; Rebs: Kuzminskas 8 Asts: Mačiulis 4	Boxscore	Pts: Obasohan 21; Rebs: Vanwijn 5 Asts: Libert 3	Arena: Siemens Arena; Referees: Aleksandar Glišić (SRB), Boris Krejić (SLO), Thomas Bissuel (FRA)

20 February 2021	**Belgium**	**88**–65	Denmark	Vilnius, Lithuania
16:30	Scoring by quarter: **24**–17, 16–**17**, **26**–15, **22**–16
	Pts: Obasohan 19; Rebs: Lecomte, Obasohan 5 Asts: Lecomte 5	Boxscore	Pts: Darboe 18; Rebs: Zohore 8 Asts: Nielsen 4	Arena: Avia Solutions Group Arena; Referees: Sergii Zashchuk (UKR), Gatis Saliņš (LAT), Mehmet Karabilecen (TUR)

20 February 2021	Czech Republic	74–**94**	**Lithuania**	Vilnius, Lithuania
19:30	Scoring by quarter: 15–**31**, 18–18, **22**–16, 19–**29**
	Pts: Peterka 18; Rebs: Peterka 7 Asts: Vyoral 5	Boxscore	Pts: Kariniauskas 15; Rebs: Kuzminskas 7 Asts: Kariniauskas 6	Arena: Avia Solutions Group Arena; Referees: Ademir Zurapović (BIH), Radomir Vojinović (MNE), Martin Vulić (CRO)

22 February 2021	Belgium	86–**91**	**Czech Republic**	Vilnius, Lithuania
16:30	Scoring by quarter: 14–**24**, 26–**27**, **25**–18, 21–**22**
	Pts: Obasohan 23; Rebs: Van Vliet 5 Asts: Lecomte, Schwartz 4	Boxscore	Pts: Hruban 24; Rebs: Peterka 8 Asts: Sehnal 4	Arena: Avia Solutions Group Arena; Referees: Radomir Vojinović (MNE), Ventsislav Velikov (BUL), Mehmet Karabilecen (TUR)

22 February 2021	Denmark	76–**77**	**Lithuania**	Vilnius, Lithuania
19:30	Scoring by quarter: 19–**25**, **18**–16, **23**–17, 16–**19**
	Pts: Larsen 21; Rebs: Zohore 10; Asts: Darboe 6	Boxscore	Pts: Kalnietis 11; Rebs: Mačiulis 6 Asts: Kalnietis 6	Arena: Avia Solutions Group Arena; Referees: Ademir Zurapović (BIH), Sergii Zashchuk (UKR), Martin Vulić (CRO)

=== Group D ===
Pos	Team	Pld	W	L	PF	PA	PD	Pts	Qualification
1	Croatia	6	4	2	442	398	+44	**10**	EuroBasket 2022
2	Netherlands	6	3	3	404	414	−10	**9 (Note: Netherlands 143–138 Turkey)**	EuroBasket 2022
3	Turkey	6	3	3	452	467	−15	**9**	EuroBasket 2022
4	Sweden	6	2	4	445	464	−19	**8**	

Source: FIBA
Rules for classification: 1) Points; 2) Head-to-head; 3) Points difference; 4) Points scored.
Notes:

21 February 2020	Turkey	65–**72**	**Netherlands**	Ankara
18:00 CET	Scoring by quarter: 17–**18**, 21–**23**, **16**–13, 11–**18**
	Pts: Mahmutoğlu 20; Rebs: Birsen 13; Asts: Birsen 4	Boxscore	Pts: Kloof 27; Rebs: Kloof 6 Asts: three players 3	Arena: Ankara Arena; Attendance: 9,563; Referees: Ademir Zurapović (BIH), Radomir Vojinović (MNE), Gintaras Vitkauskas (LTU)

21 February 2020	**Croatia**	**72**–56	Sweden	Zagreb
18:00	Scoring by quarter: **18**–6, **23**–14, 17–**25**, **14**–11
	Pts: Drežnjak 16; Rebs: Šakić 11; Asts: Ukić 8	Boxscore	Pts: Borg 11; Rebs: Borg 8 Asts: Pantzar 7	Arena: Dražen Petrović Basketball Hall; Attendance: 5,200; Referees: Eddie Viator (FRA), Ventsislav Velikov (BUL), Kristaps Konstantīnovs (LAT)

24 February 2020	Netherlands	59–**69**	**Croatia**	Almere
19:30	Scoring by quarter: **21**–18, 14–**20**, **16**–9, 8–**22**
	Pts: Franke 11; Rebs: Kherrazi 11; Asts: Kloof 4	Boxscore	Pts: Ukić 14; Rebs: Planinić 6 Asts: Ukić 6	Arena: Topsportcentrum; Attendance: 3,000; Referees: Georgios Poursanidis (GRE), Mārtiņš Kozlovskis (LAT), Fernando Calatrava (ESP)

24 February 2020	**Sweden**	**87**–80	Turkey	Stockholm
20:00	Scoring by quarter: 18–**20**, **29**–18, **20**–17, 20–**25**
	Pts: Håkanson 23; Rebs: Czerapowicz 7 Asts: Håkanson 8	Boxscore	Pts: Şanlı 23; Rebs: Birsen 8 Asts: Tuncer 8	Arena: Ericsson Globe; Attendance: 11,390; Referees: Manuel Mazzoni (ITA), Sergei Beliakov (RUS), Wojciech Liszka (POL)

27 November 2020	**Netherlands**	**78**–76	Sweden	Istanbul, Turkey
16:00	Scoring by quarter: 15–**18**, 23–**24**, **18**–12, 22–22
	Pts: Franke 22; Rebs: Kherrazi, Williams 6 Asts: De Jong 5	Boxscore	Pts: Czerapowicz 21; Rebs: Spires 11; Asts: Pantzar 7	Arena: Sinan Erdem Dome; Referees: Tanel Suslov (EST), Sergei Beliakov (RUS), Paulo Marques (POR)

27 November 2020	**Croatia**	**79**–62	Turkey	Istanbul, Turkey
19:00	Scoring by quarter: **24**–7, **21**–17, 12–**19**, **22**–19
	Pts: Bilan 30; Rebs: Bilan 12; Asts: Ukić 5	Boxscore	Pts: Mahmutoğlu 14; Rebs: Şengün 8 Asts: Larkin 5	Arena: Sinan Erdem Dome; Referees: Tomas Jasevičius (LTU), Fernando Calatrava (ESP), Alexandre Deman (FRA)

29 November 2020	Netherlands	71–**73**	**Turkey**	Istanbul, Turkey
17:00	Scoring by quarter: 14–**24**, **23**–17, **18**–14, 16–**18**
	Pts: Kloof 17; Rebs: Kloof 8 Asts: three players 3	Boxscore	Pts: Larkin 23; Rebs: Şengün 4 Asts: Larkin 9	Arena: Sinan Erdem Dome; Referees: Tomas Jasevičius (LTU), Alexandre Deman (FRA), Gintaras Vitkauskas (LTU)

29 November 2020	Sweden	72–**87**	**Croatia**	Istanbul, Turkey
20:00	Scoring by quarter: 16–**22**, 15–**26**, **22**–20, 19–19
	Pts: Andersson 22; Rebs: Andersson 8 Asts: Massamba 5	Boxscore	Pts: Marčinković 20; Rebs: Bilan 10; Asts: Ukić 5	Arena: Sinan Erdem Dome; Referees: Fernando Calatrava (ESP), Paulo Marques (POR), Tanel Suslov (EST)

20 February 2021	**Turkey**	**88**–80	Sweden	Istanbul
17:00	Scoring by quarter: **18**–17, **21**–18, **23**–22, **26**–23
	Pts: Şengün 24; Rebs: Şengün 12; Asts: Larkin 7	Boxscore	Pts: Jerebko 21; Rebs: Birgander 10; Asts: three players 5	Arena: BJK Akatlar Arena; Referees: Saverio Lanzarini (ITA), Marius Ciulin (ROU), Alexey Davydov (RUS)

20 February 2021	Croatia	57–**65**	**Netherlands**	Istanbul, Turkey
20:00	Scoring by quarter: **19**–11, 16–16, 13–**22**, 9–**16**
	Pts: Šakić 17; Rebs: Bilan, Šakić 10; Asts: Krušlin 6	Boxscore	Pts: Franke 15; Rebs: Kloof 9 Asts: Van der Vuurst de Vries 4	Arena: BJK Akatlar Arena; Referees: Manuel Mazzoni (ITA), Lorenzo Baldini (ITA), Ivor Matějek (CZE)

22 February 2021	**Sweden**	**74**–59	Netherlands	Istanbul, Turkey
17:00	Scoring by quarter: **23**–17, 16–**20**, **18**–16, **17**–6
	Pts: Czerapowicz 19; Rebs: Jerebko 11; Asts: Pantzar 5	Boxscore	Pts: Nzekwesi 11; Rebs: Van der Vuurst de Vries 6 Asts: Van der Vuurst de Vries 8	Arena: BJK Akatlar Arena; Referees: Saverio Lanzarini (ITA), Ivor Matějek (CZE), Gintaras Mačiulis (LTU)

22 February 2021	**Turkey**	**84**–78	Croatia	Istanbul
20:00	Scoring by quarter: 21–21, **21**–19, 20–**25**, **22**–13
	Pts: Şanlı, Tuncer 17; Rebs: Şanlı 6 Asts: Larkin 7	Boxscore	Pts: Gabrić 13; Rebs: Šakić 5 Asts: Prkačin 5	Arena: BJK Akatlar Arena; Referees: Manuel Mazzoni (ITA), Marius Ciulin (ROU), Lorenzo Baldini (ITA)

=== Group E ===
Pos	Team	Pld	W	L	PF	PA	PD	Pts	Qualification
1	Serbia	6	4	2	515	457	+58	**10 (Note: Serbia 182–160 Georgia)**	EuroBasket 2022
2	Georgia	6	4	2	508	517	−9	**10**	EuroBasket 2022 as host
3	Finland	6	3	3	448	464	−16	**9**	EuroBasket 2022
4	Switzerland	6	1	5	493	526	−33	**7**	

Source: FIBA
Rules for classification: 1) Points; 2) Head-to-head; 3) Points difference; 4) Points scored.
Notes:

20 February 2020	**Georgia**	**96**–88(OT)	Switzerland	Tbilisi
16:00	Scoring by quarter: **17**–8, **25**–21, 16–**24**, 21–**26**, Overtime: **17**–9
	Pts: Burjanadze 21; Rebs: Shermadini 13; Asts: McFadden 6	Boxscore	Pts: Kazadi 22; Rebs: Jurkovitz, Kazadi 10; Asts: Kazadi 10	Arena: Tbilisi Sports Palace; Attendance: 7,099; Referees: Wojciech Liszka (POL), Tanel Suslov (EST), Goran Sljivić (AUT)

20 February 2020	Finland	58–**80**	**Serbia**	Espoo
18:00	Scoring by quarter: 10–**19**, 14–**18**, 13–**23**, **21**–20
	Pts: Palmi 16; Rebs: Kotti 6 Asts: three players 3	Boxscore	Pts: Raduljica 19; Rebs: three players 8 Asts: four players 3	Arena: Espoo Metro Areena; Attendance: 6,770; Referees: Yohan Rosso (FRA), Tolga Sahin (ITA), Andrei Sharapa (BLR)

23 February 2020	Serbia	90–**94**	**Georgia**	Belgrade
17:00	Scoring by quarter: **28**–18, 20–**23**, 19–**24**, 23–**29**
	Pts: Avramović 27; Rebs: Raduljica, Zagorac 5 Asts: Jaramaz 6	Boxscore	Pts: McFadden 33; Rebs: Shermadini 11; Asts: McFadden 7	Arena: Aleksandar Nikolić Hall; Attendance: 5,257; Referees: Antonio Conde (ESP), Carsten Straube (GER), Luis Castillo (ESP)

23 February 2020	Switzerland	64–**69**	**Finland**	Fribourg
19:15	Scoring by quarter: **21**–11, **15**–10, 14–**22**, 14–**26**
	Pts: Mlađan 12; Rebs: Jurkovitz 12; Asts: Jurkovitz, Kazadi 3	Boxscore	Pts: Salin 25; Rebs: Madsen 10; Asts: Maxhuni 5	Arena: Salle Saint-Lèonard; Referees: Sergii Zashchu (UKR), Igor Mitrovski (MKD), Gvidas Gedvilas (LTU)

28 November 2020	**Switzerland**	**92**–90	Serbia	Espoo, Finland
16:30	Scoring by quarter: **28**–25, **21**–19, 24–**28**, **19**–18
	Pts: M. Mlađan 18; Rebs: Kazadi 8 Asts: Kazadi 7	Boxscore	Pts: Avramović 23; Rebs: Apić 6 Asts: three players 4	Arena: Espoo Metro Areena; Referees: Sergii Zashchuk (UKR), Janusz Calik (POL), Vilius Mačiulaitis (LTU)

28 November 2020	Finland	85–**91**	**Georgia**	Espoo
19:30	Scoring by quarter: 19–**22**, 21–**22**, **25**–21, 20–**26**
	Pts: Salin 22; Rebs: Valtonen 6 Asts: Valtonen 5	Boxscore	Pts: Shermadini 27; Rebs: Shermadini 10; Asts: McFadden 10	Arena: Espoo Metro Areena; Referees: Yohan Rosso (FRA), Alexey Davydov (RUS), Geert Jacobs (BEL)

30 November 2020	Switzerland	84–**91**	**Georgia**	Espoo, Finland
16:00	Scoring by quarter: 24–**27**, 15–**19**, 15–**19**, **30**–26
	Pts: M. Mlađan 19; Rebs: M. Mlađan 7 Asts: Kazadi 10	Boxscore	Pts: McFadden 24; Rebs: Shermadini 8 Asts: McFadden 6	Arena: Espoo Metro Areena; Referees: Janusz Calik (POL), Vilius Mačiulaitis (LTU), Beniamino Attard (ITA)

30 November 2020	**Serbia**	**75**–66	Finland	Espoo, Finland
19:00	Scoring by quarter: **17**–7, 18–18, 20–20, 20–**21**
	Pts: Anđušić 19; Rebs: Dangubić 7 Asts: three players 3	Boxscore	Pts: Maxhuni 15; Rebs: Valtonen 6 Asts: Maxhuni 6	Arena: Espoo Metro Areena; Referees: Yohan Rosso (FRA), Sergii Zashchuk (UKR), Alexey Davydov (RUS)

19 February 2021	**Finland**	**92**–84	Switzerland	Tbilisi, Georgia
16:00	Scoring by quarter: **23**–19, **26**–12, **22**–17, 21–**36**
	Pts: Koponen 21; Rebs: Madsen 6 Asts: Koponen, Valtonen 4	Boxscore	Pts: Kovac 18; Rebs: Kazadi 7 Asts: Kazadi 10	Arena: Tbilisi Sports Palace; Referees: Tolga Sahin (ITA), Apostolos Kalpakas (SWE), Sergei Beliakov (RUS)

19 February 2021	Georgia	66–**92**	**Serbia**	Tbilisi
19:00	Scoring by quarter: 10–**13**, 21–**24**, 20–**28**, 15–**27**
	Pts: Shermadini 20; Rebs: Shermadini 8 Asts: three players 3	Boxscore	Pts: Petrušev 27; Rebs: Petrušev 6 Asts: Anđušić 5	Arena: Tbilisi Sports Palace; Referees: Georgios Poursanidis (GRE), Oskars Lūsis (LAT), Kerem Baki (TUR)

21 February 2021	**Serbia**	**88**–81	Switzerland	Tbilisi, Georgia
16:00	Scoring by quarter: 21–21, 18–**20**, 19–**28**, **30**–12
	Pts: Petrušev 22; Rebs: Avramović 9 Asts: Anđušić 6	Boxscore	Pts: D. Mlađan 18; Rebs: Dubas, Kazadi 5 Asts: Kazadi 8	Arena: Tbilisi Sports Palace; Referees: Georgios Poursanidis (GRE), Oskars Lucis (LAT), Apostolos Kalpakas (SWE)

21 February 2021	Georgia	70–**78**	**Finland**	Tbilisi
19:00	Scoring by quarter: 17–**30**, 13–**19**, **27**–8, 13–**21**
	Pts: Shermadini 19; Rebs: Shermadini 12; Asts: Bakradze 5	Boxscore	Pts: Murphy, Valtonen 14; Rebs: Salin 5 Asts: Salin 5	Arena: Tbilisi Sports Palace; Referees: Tolga Şahin (TUR), Dariusz Zapolski (POL), Kerem Baki (TUR)

=== Group F ===
Pos	Team	Pld	W	L	PF	PA	PD	Pts	Qualification
1	Ukraine	6	4	2	458	414	+44	**10 (Note: Ukraine 6 Pts, +26 PD; Slovenia 6 Pts, +16 PD; Hungary 6 Pts, −42 PD)**	EuroBasket 2022
2	Slovenia	6	4	2	470	434	+36	**10**	EuroBasket 2022
3	Hungary	6	4	2	438	455	−17	**10**	EuroBasket 2022
4	Austria	6	0	6	421	484	−63	**6**	

Source: FIBA
Rules for classification: 1) Points; 2) Head-to-head; 3) Points difference; 4) Points scored.
Notes:

20 February 2020	**Hungary**	**77**–75	Slovenia	Szombathely
18:00	Scoring by quarter: 16–16, 16–**20**, 17–**18**, **28**–21
	Pts: Allen 16; Rebs: Vojvoda 5 Asts: Perl 6	Boxscore	Pts: Blažič 18; Rebs: Morgan 9 Asts: Prepelič 5	Arena: Arena Savaria; Attendance: 2,900; Referees: Yener Yilmaz (TUR), Gentian Cici (ALB), Carsten Straube (GER)

20 February 2020	Austria	73–**88**	**Ukraine**	Graz
19:30	Scoring by quarter: 17–**22**, 22–22, 9–**20**, **25**–24
	Pts: Vujošević 14; Rebs: Douvier, Hopfgartner 4 Asts: Vujošević 4	Boxscore	Pts: Lypovyy 16; Rebs: Bliznyuk, Pustovyi 7 Asts: Lukashov 8	Arena: Raiffeisen Sportpark Graz; Attendance: 2,400; Referees: Martin Horozov (BUL), Kerem Baki (TUR), Igor Mitrovski (MKD)

23 February 2020	Ukraine	60–**62**	**Hungary**	Zaporizhia
18:00	Scoring by quarter: **14**–10, 16–**18**, 18–**19**, 12–**15**
	Pts: three players 12; Rebs: Bobrov 9 Asts: Lukashov 7	Boxscore	Pts: Vojvoda 11; Rebs: Allen 8 Asts: Vojvoda 4	Arena: Palace of Sports Yunost; Attendance: 3,020; Referees: Yohan Rosso (FRA), Apostolos Kalpakas (SWE), Erez Gurion (ISR)

23 February 2020	**Slovenia**	**85**–78	Austria	Koper
17:00	Scoring by quarter: **21**–15, **22**–14, 20–**35**, **22**–14
	Pts: Morgan, Murić 19; Rebs: Murić 8 Asts: Rupnik 7	Boxscore	Pts: Vujošević 18; Rebs: Lanegger 7 Asts: Lanegger 5	Arena: Arena Bonifika; Attendance: 2,800; Referees: Nicolas Maestre (FRA), Özlem Yalman (TUR), Gintaras Mačiulis (LTU)

28 November 2020	**Slovenia**	**84**–73	Ukraine	Ljubljana
20:10	Scoring by quarter: **33**–9, 17–**19**, 13–**19**, 21–**26**
	Pts: Blažič 23; Rebs: Morgan 11; Asts: Rupnik 7	Boxscore	Pts: Herun 15; Rebs: Pavlov, Sanon 5 Asts: Bobrov, Sanon 5	Arena: Arena Stožice; Referees: Tolga Sahin (ITA), Zafer Yılmaz (TUR), Ventsislav Velikov (BUL)

29 November 2020	Austria	64–**77**	**Slovenia**	Ljubljana, Slovenia
20:10	Scoring by quarter: 12–**20**, 13–**30**, **15**–11, **24**–16
	Pts: Vujošević 22; Rebs: Mahalbašić 8 Asts: Mahalbašić 7	Boxscore	Pts: Blažič 16; Rebs: Hrovat 8 Asts: Rupnik 6	Arena: Arena Stožice; Referees: Zafer Yılmaz (TUR), Tolga Sahin (ITA), Marek Kúkelčík (SVK)

30 November 2020	**Ukraine**	**70**–67	Austria	Ljubljana, Slovenia
17:10	Scoring by quarter: **16**–14, 13–**16**, **21**–15, 20–**22**
	Pts: Mishula 20; Rebs: Petrov 10; Asts: Lypovyy 5	Boxscore	Pts: Guttl 16; Rebs: Mahalbašić 7 Asts: Mahalbašić 9	Arena: Arena Stožice; Referees: Georgios Poursanidis (GRE), Yener Yılmaz (TUR), Valerio Grigioni (ITA)

18 February 2021 (Note: The matches originally scheduled for the November 2020 window were postponed, due to several positive COVID-19 tests by Hungarian players.)	**Slovenia**	**84**–72	Hungary	Kyiv, Ukraine
21:00	Scoring by quarter: **23**–15, 17–**21**, **25**–22, **19**–14
	Pts: Blažič 24; Rebs: Blažič, Murić 6 Asts: Rupnik 7	Boxscore	Pts: Perl 16; Rebs: Filipovity 6 Asts: Ferencz, Perl 3	Arena: Palace of Sports; Referees: Eddie Viator (FRA), Paulo Marques (POR), Ilias Kounelles (CYP)

19 February 2021	Austria	81–**83**(OT)	**Hungary**	Kyiv, Ukraine
19:15	Scoring by quarter: **20**–15, **19**–15, 20–**24**, 16–**21**, Overtime: 6–**8**
	Pts: Klepeisz 21; Rebs: Mahalbašić 9 Asts: Mahalbašić 5	Boxscore	Pts: Vojvoda 22; Rebs: Keller 8 Asts: Perl 9	Arena: Palace of Sports; Referees: Eddie Viator (FRA), Paulo Marques (POR), Michał Proc (POL)

20 February 2021	**Ukraine**	**70**–65	Slovenia	Kyiv
16:00	Scoring by quarter: 9–**11**, 15–**16**, **17**–15, **29**–23
	Pts: Rendl 24; Rebs: Bliznyuk 11; Asts: Bliznyuk, Rendl 5	Boxscore	Pts: Rupnik 18; Rebs: Blažič, Murić 6 Asts: Rupnik 5	Arena: Palace of Sports; Attendance: 1,080; Referees: Eddie Viator (FRA), Özlem Yalman (TUR), Michał Proc (POL)

21 February 2021	**Hungary**	**81**–58	Austria	Kyiv, Ukraine
20:00	Scoring by quarter: 16–**18**, **22**–12, **20**–12, **23**–16
	Pts: Perl 17; Rebs: Filipovity, Szabó 6 Asts: Perl, Váradi 5	Boxscore	Pts: three players 10; Rebs: Ogunsipe 6 Asts: Guttl 4	Arena: Palace of Sports; Referees: Ilias Kounelles (CYP), Pavel Fuska (SVK), Mihkel Männiste (EST)

22 February 2021	Hungary	63–**97**	**Ukraine**	Kyiv, Ukraine
19:00	Scoring by quarter: 20–**24**, 14–**26**, 11–**27**, 18–**20**
	Pts: Filipovity 17; Rebs: Lukács 6 Asts: Pongó, Somogyi 3	Boxscore	Pts: Bobrov 19; Rebs: three players 6 Asts: Zotov 9	Arena: Palace of Sports; Attendance: 1,000; Referees: Özlem Yalman (TUR), Paulo Marques (POR), Mihkel Männiste (EST)

=== Group G ===
Pos	Team	Pld	W	L	PF	PA	PD	Pts	Qualification
1	France	6	4	2	465	444	+21	**10 (Note: France 152–150 Great Britain)**	EuroBasket 2022
2	Great Britain	6	4	2	462	446	+16	**10**	EuroBasket 2022
3	Montenegro (Note: Montenegro as the team with the best record replaced suspended Russia at the final tournament.)	6	3	3	439	455	−16	**9**	EuroBasket 2022
4	Germany	6	1	5	460	481	−21	**7**	EuroBasket 2022 as host

Source: FIBA
Rules for classification: 1) Points; 2) Head-to-head; 3) Points difference; 4) Points scored.
Notes:

21 February 2020	**Montenegro**	**81**–74	Great Britain	Podgorica
19:00	Scoring by quarter: **24**–14, 18–**24**, **20**–10, **18**–15
	Pts: Cobbs 19; Rebs: Todorović 7 Asts: Cobbs 8	Boxscore	Pts: Hesson 20; Rebs: Soko 9 Asts: Okereafor 6	Arena: Morača Sports Center; Attendance: 4,620; Referees: Georgios Poursanidis (GRE), Vilius Mačiulaitis (LTU), Gatis Saliņš (LAT)

21 February 2020	**Germany**	**83**–69	France	Vechta
20:00	Scoring by quarter: 15–**16**, **26**–18, **24**–20, **18**–15
	Pts: Benzing 22; Rebs: Jallow, Zirbes 8 Asts: Akpınar 5	Boxscore	Pts: Michineau 16; Rebs: Fall 8 Asts: three players 2	Arena: RASTA Dome; Attendance: 3,140; Referees: Manuel Mazzoni (ITA), Boris Krejič (SLO), Saša Maričić (SRB)

24 February 2020	**France**	**85**–66	Montenegro	La Roche-sur-Yon
18:45	Scoring by quarter: **18**–12, 22–**26**, **20**–16, **25**–12
	Pts: Yabusele 15; Rebs: Fall 6 Asts: Julien 7	Boxscore	Pts: Ivanović 24; Rebs: Simonović, Todorović 7 Asts: Popović 3	Arena: Vendéspace; Attendance: 4,073; Referees: Marius Ciulin (ROU), Tomas Jasevičius (LTU), Ventsislav Velikov (BUL)

24 February 2020	**Great Britain**	**81**–73	Germany	Newcastle upon Tyne
20:00	Scoring by quarter: 17–**22**, **23**–17, 16–**22**, **25**–12
	Pts: Nelson 26; Rebs: Soko 10; Asts: Hesson 5	Boxscore	Pts: Obst 24; Rebs: four players 6 Asts: Saibou 6	Arena: Eagles Community Arena; Attendance: 2,800; Referees: Ademir Zurapović (BIH), Michał Proc (POL), Tanel Suslov (EST)

27 November 2020	Great Britain	56–**79**	**France**	Pau, France
18:00	Scoring by quarter: 5–**24**, 15–**22**, **17**–16, **19**–17
	Pts: Hamilton 12; Rebs: Clark, Olaseni 6 Asts: Clark 4	Boxscore	Pts: M'Baye 24; Rebs: Cordinier 9 Asts: Albicy 9	Arena: Palais des Sports de Pau; Referees: Oskars Lucis (LAT), Lorenzo Baldini (ITA), Kerem Baki (TUR)

27 November 2020	Germany	74–**80**	**Montenegro**	Pau, France
21:00	Scoring by quarter: **24**–18, 15–**20**, 16–**21**, 19–**21**
	Pts: Benzing 21; Rebs: Obst 5 Asts: Obst 4	Boxscore	Pts: Cobbs 20; Rebs: Nikolić 8 Asts: Cobbs 6	Arena: Palais des Sports de Pau; Referees: Manuel Mazzoni (ITA), Luis Castillo (ESP), Gatis Saliņš (LAT)

29 November 2020	**France**	**86**–74	Germany	Pau
15:00	Scoring by quarter: **25**–22, 17–**19**, **19**–18, **25**–15
	Pts: Ouattara 24; Rebs: Bouteille, M'Baye 5 Asts: Albicy 7	Boxscore	Pts: Obst 16; Rebs: Jallow 5 Asts: Akpınar 4	Arena: Palais des Sports de Pau; Referees: Oskars Lūsis (LAT), Lorenzo Baldini (ITA), Gatis Saliņš (LAT)

29 November 2020	**Great Britain**	**74**–59	Montenegro	Pau, France
18:00	Scoring by quarter: **28**–19, 12–**18**, **15**–9, **19**–13
	Pts: Olaseni 28; Rebs: Olaseni 8 Asts: Nelson 6	Boxscore	Pts: Simonović 14; Rebs: Simonović 8 Asts: Cobbs, Ivanović 4	Arena: Palais des Sports de Pau; Referees: Manuel Mazzoni (ITA), Luis Castillo (ESP), Mehmet Karabilecen (TUR)

20 February 2021	Germany	81–**83**	**Great Britain**	Podgorica, Montenegro
17:00	Scoring by quarter: 21–**28**, **24**–19, **23**–19, 13–**17**
	Pts: Zirbes 14; Rebs: four players 5 Asts: Wimberg 4	Boxscore	Pts: Olaseni 20; Rebs: Olaseni 8 Asts: Mockford 5	Arena: Bemax Arena; Referees: Wojciech Liszka (POL), Tanel Suslov (EST), Beniamino Attard (ITA)

20 February 2021	Montenegro	71–**73**	**France**	Podgorica
20:45	Scoring by quarter: **17**–13, **20**–18, 16–**19**, 18–**23**
	Pts: Popović 17; Rebs: Simonović 7 Asts: Ivanović 4	Boxscore	Pts: Heurtel 16; Rebs: Chassang, M'Baye 7 Asts: Albicy, Heurtel 4	Arena: Bemax Arena; Referees: Antonio Conde (ESP), Fernando Calatrava (ESP), Martin Horozov (BUL)

22 February 2021	France	73–**94**	**Great Britain**	Podgorica, Montenegro
17:00	Scoring by quarter: 16–**26**, 19–**26**, 20–**21**, 18–**21**
	Pts: Lessort 15; Rebs: Cordinier, Lessort 6 Asts: Heurtel 8	Boxscore	Pts: Soko 27; Rebs: Hesson, Soko 7 Asts: Nelson 6	Arena: Bemax Arena; Referees: Fernando Calatrava (ESP), Tanel Suslov (EST), Can Mavisu (TUR)

22 February 2021	**Montenegro**	**82**–75	Germany	Podgorica
20:00	Scoring by quarter: **24**–22, **21**–10, 17–**22**, 20–**21**
	Pts: Ivanović 26; Rebs: Radončić 9 Asts: Ivanović 8	Boxscore	Pts: Akpınar 19; Rebs: Ogbe 9 Asts: Akpınar 3	Arena: Bemax Arena; Referees: Antonio Conde (ESP), Martin Horozov (BUL), Wojciech Liszka (POL)

=== Group H ===
Pos	Team	Pld	W	L	PF	PA	PD	Pts	Qualification
1	Bosnia and Herzegovina	6	5	1	458	383	+75	**11**	EuroBasket 2022
2	Greece	6	4	2	459	461	−2	**10**	EuroBasket 2022
3	Bulgaria	6	2	4	427	494	−67	**8**	EuroBasket 2022
4	Latvia	6	1	5	474	480	−6	**7**	

Source: FIBA
Rules for classification: 1) Points; 2) Head-to-head; 3) Points difference; 4) Points scored.

21 February 2020	**Greece**	**73**–63	Bulgaria	Patras
19:00	Scoring by quarter: **19**–17, **21**–17, **14**–12, **19**–17
	Pts: Bochoridis 19; Rebs: Agravanis 6 Asts: three players 5	Boxscore	Pts: Dimitrov 15; Rebs: Vaklinov 8 Asts: Bost 8	Arena: Dimitris Tofalos Arena; Attendance: 1,500; Referees: Sergii Zashchuk (UKR), Vladimir Jevtović (SRB), Petr Hrůša (CZE)

21 February 2020	Latvia	61–**62**	**Bosnia and Herzegovina**	Riga
19:30	Scoring by quarter: **21**–17, **15**–13, **17**–16, 8–**16**
	Pts: Laksa, Meiers 13; Rebs: Mejeris 11; Asts: Mejeris 6	Boxscore	Pts: Atić 15; Rebs: Atić 6 Asts: Atić 5	Arena: Arena Riga; Attendance: 10,100; Referees: Saverio Lanzarini (ITA), Janusz Calik (POL), Sergei Beliakov (RUS)

24 February 2020	**Bulgaria**	**110**–104(2OT)	Latvia	Botevgrad
18:00	Scoring by quarter: **22**–21, 14–**16**, 22–**26**, **27**–22, Overtime: 11–11, **14**–8
	Pts: Bost 26; Rebs: Marinov 9 Asts: Bost 8	Boxscore	Pts: Meiers 27; Rebs: Laksa, Meiers 7 Asts: Šķēle 6	Arena: Arena Botevgrad; Attendance: 2,000; Referees: Boris Krejič (SLO), Zafer Yilmaz (TUR), Zdravko Rutešić (MNE)

24 February 2020	Bosnia and Herzegovina	65–**70**	**Greece**	Tuzla
20:00	Scoring by quarter: 16–**17**, 18–**23**, 9–**18**, **22**–11
	Pts: Milošević 17; Rebs: Halilović 12; Asts: Adamović 4	Boxscore	Pts: Agravanis 17; Rebs: Agravanis, Bochoridis 7 Asts: Bochoridis 5	Arena: Mejdan Sports Center; Attendance: 5,000; Referees: Gentian Cici (ALB), Dariusz Zapolski (POL), Alexey Davydov (RUS)

27 November 2020	Greece	66–**77**	**Latvia**	Sarajevo, Bosnia and Herzegovina
18:00	Scoring by quarter: **21**–20, 9–**22**, 20–**22**, **16**–13
	Pts: Agravanis 15; Rebs: Agravanis 8 Asts: Mantzaris 5	Boxscore	Pts: Laksa 19; Rebs: Meiers 9 Asts: Šķēle 6	Arena: Sports Hall Hills; Referees: Eddie Viator (FRA), Michał Proc (POL), Ivor Matějek (CZE)

27 November 2020	**Bosnia and Herzegovina**	**88**–49	Bulgaria	Sarajevo
21:00	Scoring by quarter: **22**–11, **23**–10, **22**–18, **21**–10
	Pts: Kamenjaš 12; Rebs: Sulejmanović 11; Asts: Roberson 6	Boxscore	Pts: Bost 13; Rebs: Bost 5 Asts: Bachev, Marinov 2	Arena: Sports Hall Hills; Referees: Marius Ciulin (ROU), Wojciech Liszka (POL), Zdenko Tomašovič (SVK)

29 November 2020	Bulgaria	78–**84**(OT)	**Greece**	Sarajevo, Bosnia and Herzegovina
18:00	Scoring by quarter: **25**–17, **16**–14, 11–**15**, 19–**25**, Overtime: 7–**13**
	Pts: Kostov 15; Rebs: Ivanov 9 Asts: Bost 7	Boxscore	Pts: Athinaiou 21; Rebs: Margaritis 11; Asts: Katsivelis 6	Arena: Sports Hall Hills; Referees: Marius Ciulin (ROU), Ivor Matějek (CZE), Josip Jurčević (CRO)

29 November 2020	**Bosnia and Herzegovina**	**79**–73	Latvia	Sarajevo
21:00	Scoring by quarter: **20**–17, **20**–11, **20**–17, 19–**28**
	Pts: Kamenjaš 19; Rebs: Kamenjaš 7 Asts: Roberson 5	Boxscore	Pts: Lomažs 19; Rebs: Meiers 9 Asts: Šķēle 6	Arena: Sports Hall Hills; Referees: Eddie Viator (FRA), Michał Proc (POL), Wojciech Liszka (POL)

20 February 2021	Greece	69–**84**	**Bosnia and Herzegovina**	Riga, Latvia
16:30	Scoring by quarter: 18–**26**, 19–**23**, 14–**15**, 18–**20**
	Pts: Kavvadas 16; Rebs: Saloustros 7 Asts: Katsivelis 6	Boxscore	Pts: Sulejmanović 23; Rebs: Sulejmanović 13; Asts: Gegić 10	Arena: Arēna Rīga; Referees: Nicolás Maestre (FRA), Marek Kúkelčík (SVK), Thomas Bissuel (FRA)

20 February 2021	Latvia	65–**66**	**Bulgaria**	Riga
19:30	Scoring by quarter: **17**–15, **23**–21, **19**–15, 6–**15**
	Pts: Timma 14; Rebs: Mejeris, Šķēle 8 Asts: Bertāns 4	Boxscore	Pts: Bost 18; Rebs: Dimitrov, Kostov 5 Asts: Bost, Dimitrov 4	Arena: Arēna Rīga; Referees: Yohan Rosso (FRA), Luis Castillo (ESP), Andrei Sharapa (BLR)

22 February 2021	Bulgaria	61–**80**	**Bosnia and Herzegovina**	Riga, Latvia
16:30	Scoring by quarter: 16–**19**, 22–**24**, **16**–13, 7–**24**
	Pts: Kostadinov, Zahariev 11; Rebs: Simeonov 5 Asts: Karamfilov 9	Boxscore	Pts: Kamenjaš 17; Rebs: Kamenjaš 14; Asts: Roberson 7	Arena: Arēna Rīga; Referees: Nicolás Maestre (FRA), Andrei Sharapa (BLR), Marek Kúkelčík (SVK)

22 February 2021	Latvia	94–**97**(OT)	**Greece**	Riga
19:30	Scoring by quarter: 23–**25**, **28**–17, **18**–17, 13–**23**, Overtime: 12–**15**
	Pts: Zoriks 21; Rebs: Freimanis 7 Asts: Lomažs, Zoriks 7	Boxscore	Pts: Katsivelis 19; Rebs: Saloustros 9 Asts: Katsivelis 9	Arena: Arēna Rīga; Referees: Yohan Rosso (FRA), Luis Castillo (ESP), Valerio Grigioni (ITA)

== Qualified teams ==
After the 2022 Russian invasion of Ukraine, Russia was expelled from the tournament and replaced by Montenegro.

Team	Qualification method	Date of qualification	App	Last	Best placement in tournament
Czech Republic	Host nation	15 July 2019	6th	2017	7th place (2015)
Georgia	Host nation	15 July 2019	5th	2017	11th place (2011)
Germany	Host nation	15 July 2019	25th	2017	Champions (1993)
Italy	Host nation	15 July 2019	38th	2017	Champions (1983, 1999)
Croatia	Group D top three	29 November 2020	14th	2017	Third place (1993, 1995)
Greece	Group H top three	29 November 2020	28th	2017	Champions (1987, 2005)
Bosnia and Herzegovina	Group H top three	29 November 2020	10th	2015	8th place (1993)
Israel	Group A top three	30 November 2020	30th	2017	Runners-up (1979)
Spain	Group A top three	30 November 2020	32nd	2017	Champions (2009, 2011, 2015)
Slovenia	Group F top three	30 November 2020	14th	2017	Champions (2017)
Ukraine	Group F top three	30 November 2020	9th	2017	6th place (2013)
~~Russia~~	Group B top three	19 February 2021	14th	2017	Champions (2007)
Serbia	Group E top three	19 February 2021	13th	2017	Runners-up (2009, 2017)
Finland	Group E top three	19 February 2021	17th	2017	6th place (1967)
Poland	Group A top three	19 February 2021	29th	2017	Runners-up (1963)
Hungary	Group F top three	19 February 2021	16th	2017	Champions (1955)
Belgium	Group C top two	20 February 2021	18th	2017	Fourth place (1947)
Netherlands	Group D top three	20 February 2021	16th	2015	Fourth place (1983)
Turkey	Group D top three	20 February 2021	25th	2017	Runners-up (2001)
Bulgaria	Group H top three	20 February 2021	25th	2011	Runners-up (1957)
France	Group G top two	20 February 2021	39th	2017	Champions (2013)
Great Britain	Group G top two	20 February 2021	5th	2017	13th place (2009, 2011, 2013)
Estonia	Group B top three	22 February 2021	6th	2015	5th place (1937, 1939)
Lithuania	Group C top three	22 February 2021	15th	2017	Champions (1937, 1939, 2003)
Montenegro	Replacement	20 May 2022	4th	2017	13th place
