= Pavle Marčinković =

Croatian basketball player

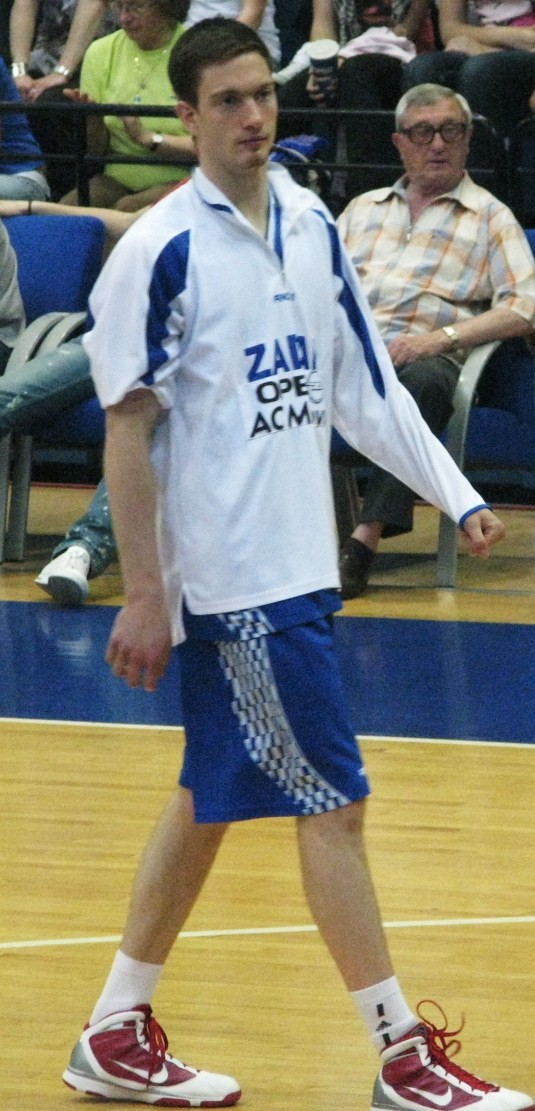
- Pavle Marčinković with Zadar in 2010

Jazine Arbanasi
- Position: Forward
- League: First Men's Basketball League

Personal information
- Born: 6 May 1989 (age 37) Zadar, SR Croatia, SFR Yugoslavia
- Listed height: 1.97 m (6 ft 6 in)

Career information
- Playing career: 2007–present

Career history
- 2007–2011: Zadar
- 2011–2013: Cibona
- 2013: Academik Sofia
- 2013: Apollon Limassol
- 2013–2017: Zagreb
- 2017–2021: Split
- 2021: Sonik-Puntamika
- 2021–2022: Zadar
- 2022–2023: Cedevita Junior
- 2023–2024: Sabah
- 2024: Alkar
- 2024–2025: Jazine Arbanasi
- 2025-present: Alkar

Career highlights
- 3× Croatian League champion (2008, 2012, 2013); Croatian Cup winner (2013)

Pavle Marčinković (born May 6, 1989) is a Croatian professional basketball player who plays for KK Alkar Sinj in the Croatian Premijer liga. Standing at 1.97 m, he plays at the forward positions.

During the 2020–21 season, Marčinković played for Split, averaging 7.1 points and 4.9 assists per game. He signed with Zadar on October 6, 2021.

== National team career ==
Marčinković was part of the Croatia national team youth programs. He played at the 2007 FIBA Europe Under-18 Championship and the 2009 FIBA Europe Under-20 Championship. He has also played for the senior team at the 2013 EuroBasket Qualifications, at the 2019 FIBA Basketball World Cup qualifications, the 2021 EuroBasket qualifications and the 2019 NBA Summer League.
