= Spiro Leka =

Albanian basketball coach (born 1966)

Personal information
- Born: 14 January 1966 (age 60) Tirana, Albania

Career information
- Playing career: 1983–1991
- Position: Head coach
- Coaching career: 1995–present

Career history

Playing
- 1983–1991: Partizani Tirana

Coaching
- 1995–1997: Basket Fano
- 2003–2006: Morciano Eagles
- 2006–2008: Titano San Marino
- 2009: Santarcangelo
- 2009–2010: Stella Maris Pesaro
- 2013–2017: Victoria Libertas Pesaro (assistant)
- 2017–2018: Victoria Libertas Pesaro
- 2019–2023: Kleb Basket Ferrara
- 2024–2026: Victoria Libertas Pesaro

Career highlights
- As player: 7× Albanian League champion (1984–1989, 1991); 4x Albanian Cup winner (1984, 1987, 1989, 1990)

Spiro Leka (born 14 January 1966) is an Albanian basketball coach and former player. He was most recently the head coach for Victoria Libertas Pesaro of the Serie A2. Before starting his coaching career in Italy, Leka played for Partizani Tirana in Albania.

== Coaching career ==
Leka was the head coach of Victoria Libertas Pallacanestro during the 2017–18 LBA season.

Leka was the head coach of Kleb Basket Ferrara from 2019 until 2023.

On October 17, 2024, he was named the head coach of Victoria Libertas Pesaro once again.
