= Kleb Basket Ferrara =

Italian basketball team

- Leagues: Serie A2 Basket
- Founded: 2011
- Arena: Palasport di Ferrara (3,504 seats)
- Location: Ferrara, Italy
- Head coach: Spiro Leka
- Website: Official website

Kleb Basket Ferrara is an Italian professional basketball team that competes in the Serie A2 Basket league.

For sponsorship reasons, it has also been called Top Secret Ferrara.

== Notable players ==
- Set a club record or won an individual award as a professional player.
- Played at least one official international match for his senior national team at any time.

- (San Marino) Pietro Ugolini
- (Switzerland) Patrick Baldassarre
- (United States) A.J. Pacher
- (United States) Andrew Smith
