= Jonathan Kazadi =

Swiss basketball player

No. 6 – Fribourg Olympic
- Position: Shooting guard
- League: Swiss Basketball League

Personal information
- Born: June 9, 1991 (age 35) Bern, Switzerland
- Listed height: 6 ft 5 in (1.96 m)

Career information
- NBA draft: 2013: undrafted
- Playing career: 2007–present

Career history
- 2007–2016: Fribourg Olympic
- 2016–2017: Orléans Loiret
- 2017: Monthey
- 2018: AMSB
- 2018: Valladolid
- 2019–2021: Lille
- 2021–2022: Medipolis SC Jena
- 2022–present: Fribourg Olympic
Medals
Men's 3x3 basketball
Representing Switzerland
FIBA 3x3 World Cup
Silver medal – second place	2025 Ulaanbaatar	Team

Jonathan Malu Kazadi-Muyombu, (born June 24, 1989) is a Swiss professional basketball player for Fribourg Olympic of the Swiss Basketball League.

== Career ==
He has been a member of the Switzerland national basketball team on several occasions. At the EuroBasket 2017 qualification, he led the Swiss team in assists and offensive rebounds.
