= Patrick Baldassarre =

Swiss basketball player

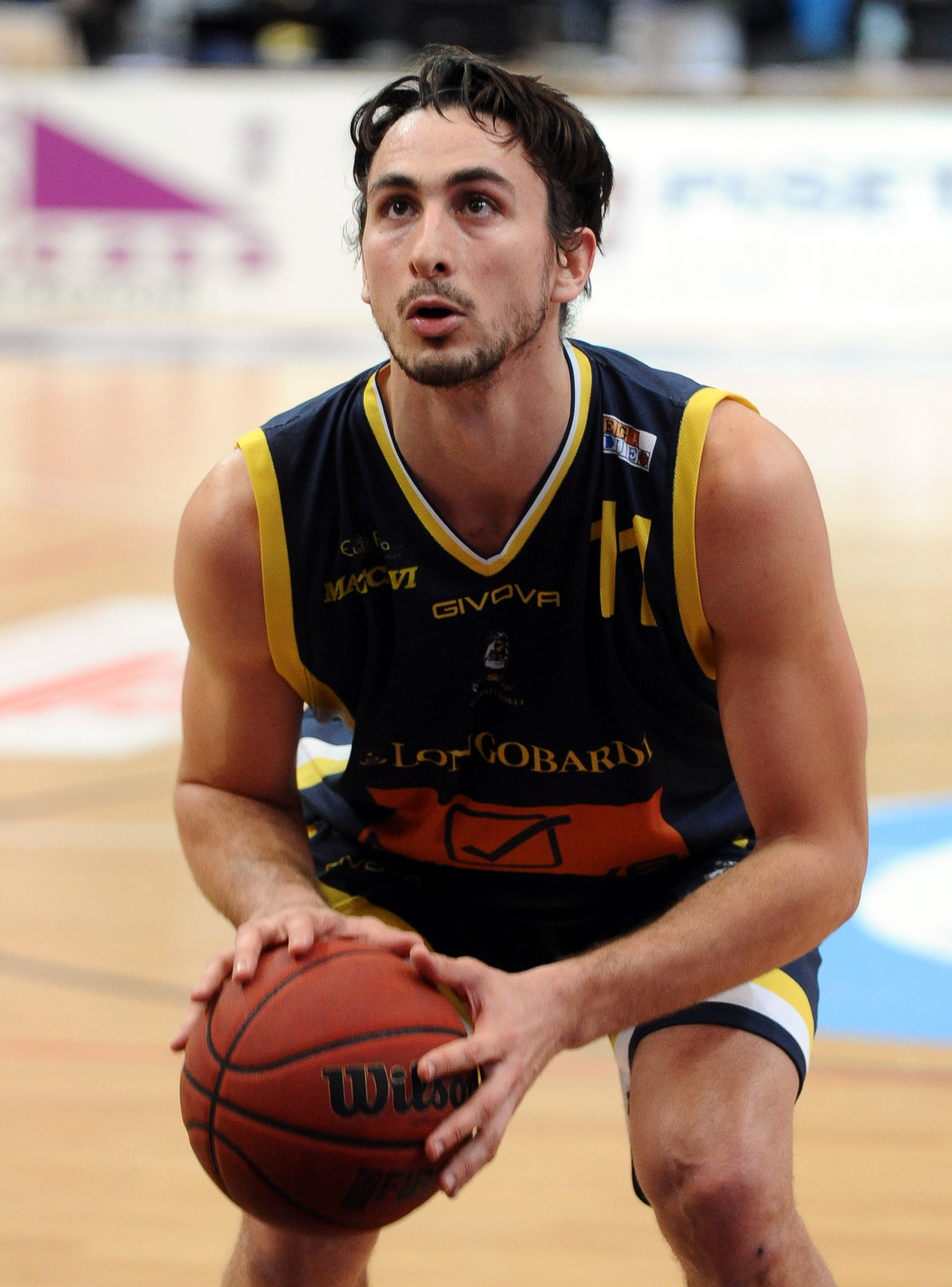
- Patrick Baldassarre Picture

No. 11 – Kleb Basket Ferrara
- Position: Small forward
- League: Serie A2 Basket

Personal information
- Born: 3 May 1986 (age 40) Sion, Switzerland
- Listed height: 1.98 m (6 ft 6 in)
- Listed weight: 210 lb (95 kg)

Career information
- Playing career: 2002–present

Career history
- 2018–2019: Benacquista Assicurazioni Latina
- 2019–present: Kleb Basket Ferrara

Patrick Baldassarre (born 3 May 1986) is a Swiss professional basketball player for Kleb Basket Ferrara of the Italian Serie A2 Basket.

== Professional career ==
In 2018, he joined Benacquista Assicurazioni Latina of the Italian Serie A2 Basket. In the summer of 2019, he signed with the team's competitor Kleb Basket Ferrara. In June 2020, he extended with Ferrara for another year.

== Swiss national team ==
Baldassarre has been a member of the Swiss national basketball team.
