= Christopher Razis =

Cypriot-Greek basketball player

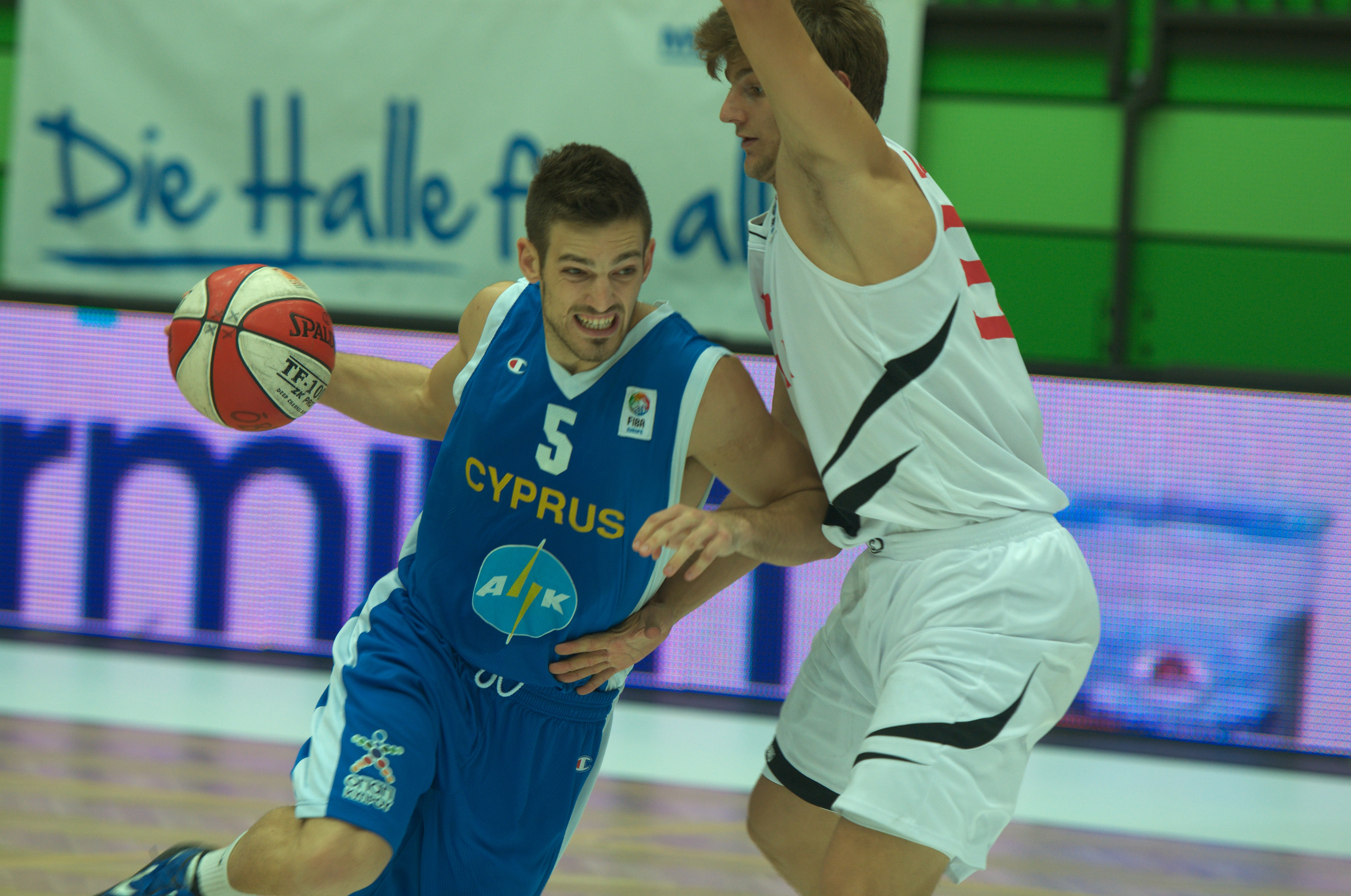
- Razis in action with Cyprus national team

No. 32 – Keravnos
- Position: Point guard / shooting guard
- League: Cypriot League

Personal information
- Born: 7 July 1989 (age 37) Zürich, Switzerland
- Listed height: 6 ft 4.25 in (1.94 m)
- Listed weight: 220 lb (100 kg)

Career information
- NBA draft: 2011: undrafted
- Playing career: 2005–present

Career history
- 2005–2010: Keravnos
- 2010–2011: ENAD
- 2011–2012: EWE Baskets Oldenburg
- 2012–2013: ENAD
- 2013–2014: OFI
- 2014–2016: Oettinger Rockets Gotha
- 2016–2017: Rethymno Cretan Kings
- 2017–2018: Rasta Vechta
- 2018–2020: Rethymno Cretan Kings
- 2020–present: Keravnos

Career highlights
- Cypriot League champion (2022); ProA champion (2018); Cypriot Super Cup winner (2021); 2× Cypriot League Most Improved Player (2011, 2013); Cypriot League Rookie of the Year (2010)

Christopher Razis (alternate spelling: Christophoros) (Greek: Χριστόφορος Ράζης; born 7 July 1989) is a Cypriot/Greek professional basketball player for Keravnos of the Cypriot League. He is a 1.94 m (6 ft 4 in) tall combo guard.

== Professional career ==
Razis played youth basketball with Keravnos at Cyprus where he started his pro career in 2005. he stayed at the club until 2010, when he was awarded the Rookie of the Year in the Cypriot League. The following year, Razis joined ENAD.

After his stand-out appearances with ENAD, Razis joined EWE Baskets Oldenburg of the Basketball Bundesliga and making history as the first ever Cypriot basketball player to play professionally in another country other than Greece.

In 2012, he returned to ENAD and one year later, he joined OFI of the Greek A2 Basketball League. After 1,5 years with the team, he decided to leave the team in December 2014, to join Oettinger Rockets Gotha of the Pro A League.

In July 2016, Razis joined Rethymno Cretan Kings of the Greek League.

On June 14, 2017, he joined SC Rasta Vechta of the ProA.

On June 18, 2018, he re-joined Rethymno Cretan Kings B.C. of the Greek Basket League

== Cyprus national team ==
Razis has been a member of the junior national teams of Cyprus for some years. Razis played for U16 National Team back in 2005. Now, he is one of the leaders of the Cyprus national team where he plays since 2008.
