= Viron Toska =

Albanian basketball player and coach

Personal information
- Born: 29 June 1956 Vlorë, Albania
- Died: 4 November 2020 (aged 64) Tirana, Albania

Career information
- Playing career: 1978–1985
- Coaching career: 1985–2020

Career history

Playing
- 1978–1980: Flamurtari
- 1980–1983: Studenti
- 1983–1985: Flamurtari

Coaching
- 1985–2003: Flamurtari (youth)
- 2003–2020: Flamurtari (women)
- 2017–2018: Albania (women)

Career highlights
- As head coach: 15× Albanian League (women) champion; 11x Albanian Cup (women) winner; 12x Albanian Supercup (women) winner

Viron Toska was an Albanian basketball coach and former basketball player. He died in 2020 due to COVID-19.

== Honours ==
Toska was awarded the Honorary Citizen of Vlorë in 2017.
