= Erblira Bici =

Albanian volleyball player (born 1995)

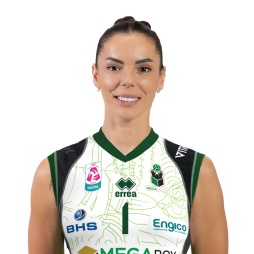

Personal information
- Nationality: Albania
- Born: 27 June 1995 (age 31); Gramsh, Albania
- Height: 1.85 m (6 ft 1 in)
- Weight: 70 kg (154 lb)
- Spike: 315 cm (124 in)
- Block: 305 cm (120 in)

Volleyball information
- Position: Wing Spiker / Opposite spiker
- Current club: Megabox Vallefoglia
- Number: 1

Career
Years	Teams
2010–2013; 2013–2016; 2016–2018; 2018–2019; 2019–2020; 2020–2021; 2021–2022; 2022–2024; 2024–	KV Tirana; Barleti Volley; Pallavolo Mondovì; Igor Gorgonzola Novara; UYBA Volley; Cuneo Granda Volley; Futura Volley Giovani; Roma Volley Club; Megabox Vallefoglia

National team
2014–	Albania

Erblira Bici (born 27 June 1995) is an Albanian volleyball player, who plays as an opposite spiker. She currently plays for Megabox Vallefoglia.

== Career ==
Erblira's career began in 2005 when she played for a team from her birthplace. She made her debut in first division of the Albanian championship in 2010–11 season with KV Tirana, in which she stayed three years, winning two Albanian Cup two times and the championship in 2012–13 season. In the 2013–14 season she was signed by Barleti Volley with which she won three national cups and three championships for the three years; in 2014 she obtained the first participation in the Albania national team.

In 2016 she was moved to Italy, to the Pallavolo Mondovì, in Serie A2, where he remained for two years, before moving to the AGIL Volley from Novara in Serie A1, in 2018, and there she won 2018–19 Italian Cup and the 2018–19 Champions League and thus became the first Albanian player to win the top-tier European club volleyball competition.

== Clubs ==
- (Albania) KV Tirana (2010–2013)
- (Albania) Barleti Volley (2013–2016)
- (Italy) Pallavolo Mondovì (2016–2018)
- (Italy) Igor Gorgonzola Novara (2018–2019)
- (Italy) Futura Volley Busto Arsizio (2019–2020)
- (Italy) Cuneo Granda Volley (2020–2021)
- (Italy) Futura Volley Giovani (2021–2022)
- (Italy) Roma Volley Club (2022–2024)
- (Italy) Megabox Vallefoglia (2024–)

== Achievements ==
- 2012 Albanian Cup — Champions, with KV Tirana
- 2012–13 Albanian Championship - Champion, with KV Tirana
- 2013 Albanian Cup — Champions, with KV Tirana
- 2013–14, 2014–15, 2015–16 Albanian Championship - Champion, with Barleti Volley
- 2014, 2015, 2016 Albanian Cup — Champions, with Barleti Volley
- 2018–19 CEV Champions League — Champions, with Igor Gorgonzola Novara
- 2019 Italian Cup — Champions, with Igor Gorgonzola Novara
- 2023 Italian Cup A2 — Champions, with Roma Volley Club
