= FSHV Cup =

- Sport: Volleyball
- Country: Albania
- Confederation: (European Union) CEV
- Most recent champion: Farka Volley (1st title)
- Broadcasters: RTSH; TeleSport
- Related competitions: Albanian League; Albanian Cup
- Website: fshfv.org

The FSHV Cup is a competition featuring professional volleyball clubs from Albania and it is contested between the 4 clubs that finished highest in the previous Albanian Volleyball League.

== Title holders ==
- 2011 ?
- 2012 Teuta
- 2013 ?
- 2014 Tirana
- 2015 Studenti
- 2016 Farka Volley

== See also ==
- Albanian Volleyball Federation
- Albanian Volleyball League
- Albanian Volleyball Cup
