= Albanian Volleyball League =

- Current season, competition or edition: 2024–25 Albanian Volleyball League
- Sport: Volleyball
- Founded: 1946
- Divisions: 1
- No. of teams: 9
- Country: Albania
- Confederation: CEV
- Most recent champion: Partizani (17th title) (2024-25)
- Most titles: Dinamo (25 titles)
- Broadcasters: RTSH & TeleSport
- Level on pyramid: 1
- Relegation to: A1 League
- International cup: CEV Challenge Cup
- Website: fshfv.org

The Albanian Volleyball League is the top flight professional volleyball league competition in Albania, which currently features 7 clubs in 1 division. The league was founded in 1946, shortly after the formation of the Albanian Volleyball Federation (FSHV) and it has remained the top flight men's volleyball competition in the country ever since. Dinamo Tirana have won the most championship titles with 25, but they have won just 2 titles since 1991, as Studenti later became a dominant club in the country, winning 14 out of a possible 18 titles between 2000 and 2016.

The league currently consists of 9 clubs in 1 division, but other formats have been used such as a division consisting of 7 clubs, as well as 2 divisions consisting of 12 clubs. Having started in 1946, it is one of the oldest and longest running volleyball competitions Balkans, and the sport experiences its peak in popularity during the Communist era in the 70s and 80s. Since the fall of communism in Albania in 1991 many volleyball clubs struggled to remain active due to a lack of funding, which led to the decline in the popularity of the sport as a whole in the country. However, since 1993 there has been some re-establishment of clubs that had previously folded, as private investment along with some state funded has allowed some of these clubs to continue functioning.

== Current teams ==
Club	Location	Arena	Capacity	Head coach
Elbasani	Elbasan	Tomorr Sinani Sports Palace	1,000	(Albania) Fisnik Lushnjari
Erzeni	Durrës	Ramazan Njala Sports Palace	3,000	(Albania) Rezart Muka
Farka Volley	Tirana	Farie Hoti Sports Palace	1,000	(Albania) Dritan Bardhi
Partizani	Tirana	Asllan Rusi Sports Palace	2,800	(Albania) Ylli Tomorri
Skënderbeu	Korçë	Tamara Nikolla Sports Palace	1,000	(Albania) Arben Prifti
Studenti	Tirana	Asllan Rusi Sports Palace	2,800	(Albania) Arben Sako
Teuta	Durrës	Ramazan Njala Sports Palace	3,000	(Albania) Leonard Marangoni
Tirana	Tirana	Farie Hoti Sports Palace	1,000	(Albania) Ilia Koja
Vllaznia	Shkodër	Qazim Dërvishi Sports Palace	1,200	(Albania) Mark Kroqi

== Title holders ==
- 1946 Ylli i Kuq
- 1947 17 Nëntori
- 1948 17 Nëntori
- 1949 17 Nëntori
- 1950 Partizani
- 1951 Puna Durrës
- 1952 Partizani
- 1953 Partizani
- 1954 Partizani
- 1955 Partizani
- 1956 Dinamo
- 1957 Spartaku
- 1958 Partizani
- 1959 Partizani
- 1960 Partizani
- 1961 Partizani
- 1962 Partizani
- 1963 Lokomotiva
- 1964 Dinamo
- 1965 Dinamo
- 1966 Dinamo
- 1967 Dinamo
- 1968–69 Dinamo
- 1969–70 Dinamo
- 1970–71 Dinamo
- 1971–72 Dinamo
- 1972–73 Partizani
- 1973–74 Dinamo
- 1974–75 Dinamo
- 1975–76 Partizani
- 1976–77 Dinamo
- 1977–78 Dinamo
- 1978–79 Dinamo
- 1979–80 Dinamo
- 1980–81 Partizani
- 1981–82 Dinamo
- 1982–83 Dinamo
- 1983–84 Dinamo
- 1984–85 Dinamo
- 1985–86 Dinamo
- 1986–87 17 Nëntori
- 1987–88 17 Nëntori
- 1988–89 Dinamo
- 1989–90 Dinamo
- 1990–91 Dinamo
- 1991–92 Tirana
- 1992–93 Tirana
- 1993–94 Tirana
- 1994–95 Studenti
- 1995–96 Olimpik
- 1996–97 Erzeni
- 1997–98 Erzeni
- 1998–99 Erzeni
- 1999–00 Studenti
- 2000–01 Teuta
- 2001–02 Studenti
- 2002–03 Studenti
- 2003–04 Studenti
- 2004–05 Studenti
- 2005–06 Dinamo
- 2006–07 Studenti
- 2007–08 Studenti
- 2008–09 Studenti
- 2009–10 Studenti
- 2010–11 Teuta
- 2011–12 Studenti
- 2012–13 Studenti
- 2013–14 Studenti
- 2014–15 Studenti
- 2015–16 Studenti
- 2016-17 Vllaznia
- 2017-18 Erzeni
- 2018-19 Partizani
- 2019-20 cancelled due to pandemic
- 2020-21 Partizani
- 2021–22 Tirana
- 2022–23 Tirana
- 2023–24 Partizani
- 2024–25 Partizani

== Performance by club ==
Club	Winner	Years
Dinamo	25	1956, 1964, 1965, 1966, 1967, 1968–69, 1969–70, 1970–71, 1971–72, 1973–74, 1974–75, 1976–77, 1977–78, 1978–79, 1979–80, 1981–82, 1982–83, 1983–84, 1984–85, 1985–86, 1988–89, 1989–90, 1990–91, 1995–96, 2005–06
Partizani	17	1950, 1952, 1953, 1954, 1955, 1958, 1959, 1960, 1961, 1962, 1972–73, 1975–76, 1980–81, 2018–19, 2020–21, 2023–24, 2024-25
Studenti	15	1994–95, 1999–00, 2001–02, 2002–03, 2003–04, 2004–05, 2006–07, 2007–08, 2008–09, 2009–10, 2011–12, 2012–13, 2013–14, 2014–15, 2015–16
Tirana	11	1947, 1948, 1949, 1957, 1986–87, 1987–88, 1991–92, 1992–93, 1993–94, 2021–22, 2022–23
Teuta	5	1946, 1951, 1963, 2000–01, 2010–11
Erzeni	4	1996–97, 1997–98, 1998–99, 2017–18
Vllaznia	1	2016–17

== See also ==
- Albanian Volleyball Federation
- Albanian Volleyball Cup
- Albanian Volleyball Supercup
