= Albania men's national volleyball team =

Men's national volleyball team representing Albania

Albania
- Association: Albanian Federation of Volleyball
- Confederation: CEV
- Head coach: Giannis Melkas

Uniforms
Home	Away

World Championship
- Appearances: 1 (First in 1962)
- Best result: 16th (1962)

European Championship
- Appearances: 3 (First in 1955)
- Best result: 10th (1955)
- fshfv.org (in Albanian)

The Albania men's national volleyball team is the national volleyball team of Albania. As of December 2021, the team is ranked 78th in the world. They have competed in many European and world volleyball championships, but as of October 16, 2021, are yet to win a gold medal.

== Campaigns ==
Albania competed in the Men's European Volleyball Championship three times, in 1955, 1958, and 1967. They also competed in the FIVB Volleyball Men's World Championship in 1962.

Albania competed seven times at the Mediterranean Games. They first participated in 1991 in Athens, Greece. Afterwards, they played at the Mediterranean Games in 1993, 1997, 2001, and again in 2018 in Tarragona, Spain.

=== Albania at the Men's European Volleyball Championships ===
==== 1955 ====
Albania competed for the first time at the 1955 Men's European Volleyball Championship in Bucharest, Romania.

In Group A, they faced France, Finland, and the Soviet Union. Albania lost their first two matches against France and the Soviet Union (both 3–0) but recorded their first win at a Men's European Volleyball Championship against Finland 3–1. Albania finished third in the group of four countries.

In the 9–14th place group, Albania faced Egypt, Italy, Belgium, Austria, and Finland. After a 3–2 loss against Finland, the team beat their next three opponents: Egypt and Austria lost 3–0 to Albania, and Belgium lost 3–2. In the final match Albania lost to Italy. Albania finished in 10th place in the tournament.

==== 1958 ====
Albania competed for the second time in the 1958 Men's European Volleyball Championship in Prague, Czechoslovakia.

In Group D, Albania faced the Soviet Union, Austria, Turkey, and Yugoslavia. Albania first beat Austria 3–0, but lost their next four matches against Turkey, the Soviet Union, and Yugoslavia, all with a score of 3–0. Albania ranked fourth out of five in the group.

Albania then faced East Germany, Turkey, Italy, Finland, Tunisia, Egypt, and the Netherlands in the 9–16th place group. Albania was successful in beating Tunisia and Turkey 3–1, Egypt 3–0, and Finland 3–1. Albania then faced East Germany, losing 3–0. They went on to beat the Netherlands 3–2 in a close match for their sixth win of the tournament. In their final match for 10th place, Albania lost to Italy by a score of 3–0, finishing in 11th place at the end of the tournament.

==== 1967 ====
The Albania men's national volleyball team participated once more at the 1967 Men's European Volleyball Championship in Istanbul, Turkey.

In Group D, Albania faced Poland, West Germany, Bulgaria, and Romania. Albania lost to Romania 3–0, to Bulgaria 3–1, and to Poland 3–0. They later beat West Germany 3–0, again qualifying for the 9–16th place group.

In this group, Albania faced France, Belgium, Sweden, Israel, Turkey, Bulgaria, and the Netherlands. Albania lost to France 3–1 and to Belgium 3–0. After that, they won 3 matches in a row against hosts Turkey 3–1, Sweden 3–0, and the Netherlands 3–2. To close out the tournament, Albania lost to Israel 3–0 and ended in 13th place.

== Team ==
=== Current roster ===
Updated: 17 October 2016

The following is a list of players that represented Albania at the 2016 CEV Volleyball European League.

Head coach:	(Albania) (Greece) Giannis Melkas
Assistant coach:	(Albania) Artan Kalaja

No.	Name	Date of birth	Height	Weight	Spike	Block	2015/16 club
1	Altin Gorenxha	May 4, 1978 (age 47)	1.87 m (6 ft 2 in)	90 kg (200 lb)	305 cm (120 in)	290 cm (110 in)	(Albania) Studenti
2	Renato Kola	July 8, 1987 (age 38)	1.75 m (5 ft 9 in)	64 kg (141 lb)	320 cm (130 in)	300 cm (120 in)	(Albania) Vllaznia
3	Osman Qepa	April 2, 1996 (age 29)	1.96 m (6 ft 5 in)	79 kg (174 lb)	345 cm (136 in)	334 cm (131 in)	(Albania) Farka Volley
4	Redjon Koçi	November 1, 1994 (age 31)	2.02 m (6 ft 8 in)	98 kg (216 lb)	350 cm (140 in)	338 cm (133 in)	(Albania) Farka Volley
5	Gert Lisha	June 28, 1995 (age 30)	2.00 m (6 ft 7 in)	98 kg (216 lb)	354 cm (139 in)	340 cm (130 in)	(United States) USC Trojans
6	Arbër Troka	December 29, 1988 (age 37)	1.96 m (6 ft 5 in)	90 kg (200 lb)	356 cm (140 in)	320 cm (130 in)	(Albania) Studenti
7	Adriatik Kajtazi	August 17, 1987 (age 38)	1.94 m (6 ft 4 in)	86 kg (190 lb)	335 cm (132 in)	325 cm (128 in)	(Kosovo) Drenica R&Rukolli
8	Gazmend Husaj	December 23, 1987 (age 38)	2.00 m (6 ft 7 in)	97 kg (214 lb)	360 cm (140 in)	345 cm (136 in)	(Turkey) Inegol Belediyesi
9	Kreshnik Malaj	November 9, 1989 (age 36)	2.00 m (6 ft 7 in)	84 kg (185 lb)	330 cm (130 in)	320 cm (130 in)	(Albania) Studenti
10	Enea Xhelati	May 15, 1982 (age 43)	2.02 m (6 ft 8 in)	97 kg (214 lb)	345 cm (136 in)	335 cm (132 in)	(Greece) Pamvohaikos
11	Alvi Shurdhi	August 3, 1995 (age 30)	1.86 m (6 ft 1 in)	82 kg (181 lb)	345 cm (136 in)	320 cm (130 in)	(Greece) Foinikas Syros
12	Asmend Kula	January 10, 1994 (age 32)	1.98 m (6 ft 6 in)	94 kg (207 lb)	345 cm (136 in)	335 cm (132 in)	(Albania) Tirana
13	Blerim Pepaj	November 9, 1985 (age 40)	1.98 m (6 ft 6 in)	90 kg (200 lb)	340 cm (130 in)	330 cm (130 in)	(Albania) Tirana
14	Anton Qafarena	June 11, 1997 (age 28)	2.06 m (6 ft 9 in)	87 kg (192 lb)	360 cm (140 in)	340 cm (130 in)	(Albania) Vllaznia
15	Adri Arapi	June 12, 1997 (age 28)	1.94 m (6 ft 4 in)	90 kg (200 lb)	345 cm (136 in)	330 cm (130 in)	(Albania) Tirana
16	Gjergj Bardhi	September 12, 1982 (age 43)	1.92 m (6 ft 4 in)	98 kg (216 lb)	332 cm (131 in)	320 cm (130 in)	(Albania) Teuta
