= Donald Suxho =

Albanian-American volleyball player (born 1976)

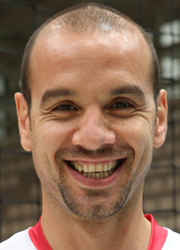
- Suxho in 2013

Personal information
- Nationality: Albanian, American
- Born: February 21, 1976 (age 50); Korcë, Albania
- Hometown: Huntington Beach, California, U.S.
- Height: 6 ft 4 in (1.94 m)
- Weight: 216 lb (98 kg)
- Spike: 136 in (345 cm)
- Block: 128 in (325 cm)
- Education: University of Southern California

Coaching information
- Current team: Kosovo U17 (women's)
Previous teams coached
Years	Teams
2023–	Kosovo U17 (women's)

Volleyball information
- Position: Setter

Career
Years	Teams
1991–1996	Skënderbeu Korçë
1997–2000	USC Trojans
2001–2002	AZS Olsztyn
2003–2005	Erdemir SK
2005–2006	Olympiacos
2006–2007	Gabeca Montichiari
2007–2008	Patras
2008–2009	Arkas Spor
2009–2010	Prisma
2010–2011	Dinamo-Yantar Kaliningrad
2011–2012	Treviso
2012–2013	Bolívar
2013–2014	Trentino
2014	Studenti

National team
1991–1996	Albania
2002–2013	United States

Donald Suxho (born February 21, 1976) is an Albanian-American professional volleyball player and a player for the U.S. Olympic Team. As a setter, he participated in the 2004 Olympic games in Athens, Greece as well as the 2012 Olympic Games in London. Suxho and his family came to America in 1996 and lived in Natick, Massachusetts while searching for a college. He eventually chose to play for the University of Southern California and became one of the most well-known volleyball players to come out of USC.

== Playing career ==
Suxho's father Peter is the former coach of the Albanian Junior National team as well as the Natick High School boys and girls volleyball coach and it was under his tutelage in the U.S. and Albania that Suxho learned the game. Suxho played for the Albanian junior national team from 1991 to 1996 and made the national team while still a teenager in 1995–96.

While at USC, Suxho was a four-year starter for a nationally ranked team. He set a number of Trojan records, including 164 career aces. He became one of the top players in school history and was a two-time All-American and AVCA National Player of the Year as a senior in 2000. Following graduation, he played professional beach volleyball in Poland and has been a member of the U.S. Olympic Team since 2001. He competed in the Athens Olympics but missed Beijing due to injury. In 2012, he was one of 40 USC athletes to make an Olympic team.

In addition to his playing career, Suxho served as the USC assistant men's volleyball coach during the 2001–02 season.

In the summer of 2014, Suxho played with "Studenti" in Tirana Albania for a European Tournament.

== IMG Academy ==
In 2022 IMG Academy hired Suxho as Director of Volleyball to launch the acclaimed private athletic school's entry into the sport of girl's indoor volleyball, beginning in fall of 2023.

Donald Suxho resigned from his role as IMG volleyball director due to “personal reasons” in November 2023.

== Awards ==
- Suxho received a Sportsmanship award from Albanian Roots at the Albanian Roots Parade in the summer of 2013.
- Suxho was named Albania's Worldwide Volleyball Ambassador in 2023.
