= 2024–25 Albanian A-1 League (women) =

Women's basketball league in Albania

Albanian A-1 League
- Season: 2024–25
- Dates: Regular season: 8 October 2024 – 30 March 2025; Play Offs: 2–23 April 2025
- Games played: 72
- Teams: 7

Regular season
- Season MVP: (United States) Desiree Ramos

Finals
- Champions: Flamurtari Vlorë (14th title)
- Runners-up: Tirana
- Finals MVP: (Canada) Jose-Ann Johnson

Statistical leaders
Points	(United States) Aniylah Bryant	27.5
Rebounds	(United States) Shernecia Martin	11.8
Assists	(United States) Jainaya Jones	7.4
Steals	(Albania) Bernada Rreshpja	5.1
Blocks	(United States) Sarah Mgbeike	1.2

The 2024–25 Albanian A-1 League is the 79th season of the top division women's basketball league in Albania since its establishment in 1946. It starts in October 2024 with the first round of the regular season and ends in April 2025.

Tirana are the defending champions.

Flamurtari Vlorë won their fourteenth title after beating Tirana in the final.

== Format ==
Each team plays each other three times. The top four teams qualify for the play offs, where every round is held as a best of five series.

=== Regular season ===
Pos	Team	Pld	W	L	PF	PA	PD	Pts	Qualification
1	Flamurtari Vlorë	18	17	1	1475	1015	+460	35	Play Offs
2	Tirana	18	15	3	1381	1098	+283	33	Play Offs
3	Partizani	18	13	5	1427	1306	+121	31	Play Offs
4	Teuta	18	7	11	1476	1535	−59	25 (Note: Teuta 2–1 Vllaznia)	Play Offs
5	Vllaznia	18	7	11	1104	1187	−83	25	
6	Studenti	18	4	14	1146	1293	−147	22	
7	Elbasani	18	0	18	1035	1610	−575	18	

Source: FSHB
Rules for classification: 1) Points; 2) Points difference; 3) Points scored.

== Play offs ==
Semifinals
1	Flamurtari Vlorë	83	87	74	3
4	Teuta	66	75	51	0
2	Tirana	77	70	86	3
3	Partizani	73	66	82	0

Final
1	Flamurtari Vlorë	68	78	63	3
2	Tirana	53	69	53	0

Champions of Albania

Flamurtari Vlorë
Fourteenth title
