= Nationwide Volleyball Supercup (women) =

The Nationwide Volleyball Supercup for Women is a competition featuring professional women volleyball clubs from Albania, North Macedonia and Kosovo and consists in 4 teams playing in a direct elimination through semi-finals and the final. The team with the most trophies is KV Tirana of Albania with 1 cup. They won the 2011 final against UMB Volley of Albania, played in Tirana by scoreline 3-1.

== Winners ==
These are the winners of the Nationwide Volleyball Supercup Women

| Season | Supercup Winner |
|---|---|
| 2011 | KV Tirana |

=== Trophy Ranking ===
KV Tirana 1 time

- There are data missing for this tournament, updates will follow in the due course.

== See also ==
- Nationwide Volleyball Supercup
- Albanian Volleyball Supercup (Women)
- Albanian Volleyball Cup (Women)
- Volleyball in Albania
