= Pallavolo Mondovì =

Mondovì Volley
- Full name: Mondovì Volley
- Ground: PalaManera, Mondovì, Italy
- Chairman: Mario Bovetti
- Head coach: Claudio Basso
- League: FIPAV Women's Serie B1
- Website: Club home page

Uniforms
| Home | Away |

Pallavolo Mondovì is an Italian women's volleyball club based in Mondovì and currently playing in the Serie B1.

== Previous names ==
Due to sponsorship, the club have competed under the following names:

- Pallavolo Mondovì (....–2004)
- LPM Pallavolo Mondovì (2004–2016)
- LPM Bam Mondovì (2016–2024)
- Bam Mondovì (2024–2025)
- Mondovì Volley (2025–present)

== History ==
Pallavolo Mondovì was established in the 1980s when it acquired the rights of A.S. Piazza and took over the women's volleyball department of Acli Unione Sportiva Altipiano. It started competing in regional competitions before playing the Serie D and Serie C. In 2004, it was renamed LPM Pallavolo Mondovì and started a restructure process. Promotion to Serie B2 was achieved in 2008 with the club winning the title (and promotion to Serie B1) in the 2013–14 season. The club was promoted to Serie A2 in 2016. Despite being relegated to Serie B1 after finishing 13th in the 2016–17 Serie A2, the club requested to be on a waiting list for the Serie A2 in the following season. On 31 July 2017, the club was confirmed as a participant of the Serie A2 for the 2017–18 season.

== Team ==
2017–2018 Team
| Number | Player | Position | Height (m) | Birth date |
|---|---|---|---|---|
| 1 | (Albania) Erblira Bici | Opposite | 1.85 | 27 June 1995 (age 30) |
| 4 | (Spain) Jessica Rivero | Outside Hitter | 1.81 | 15 March 1995 (age 30) |
| 5 | (Italy) Bianca Mazzotti | Setter | 1.83 | 12 November 1998 (age 27) |
| 7 | (Italy) Viola Tonello | Middle Blocker | 1.84 | 3 January 1994 (age 32) |
| 9 | (Italy) Ilaria Demichelis | Setter | 1.79 | 27 August 1987 (age 38) |
| 10 | (Italy) Giulia Sciolla | Middle Blocker | 1.86 | 24 June 1996 (age 29) |
| 12 | (Italy) Federica Biganzoli | Outside Hitter | 1.79 | 5 November 1987 (age 38) |
| 13 | (Italy) Angelica Costamagna | Outside Hitter | 1.79 | 29 March 1999 (age 26) |
| 14 | (Italy) Elena Rolando | Libero | 1.65 | 16 July 1999 (age 26) |
| 15 | (Italy) Sofia Rebora | Middle Blocker | 1.79 | 23 February 1993 (age 33) |
| 17 | (Italy) Silvia Agostino | Libero | 1.65 | 30 September 1989 (age 36) |
| 18 | (Italy) Aurora Camperi | Outside Hitter | 1.89 | 23 August 1997 (age 28) |

2016–2017 Team
| Number | Player | Position | Height (m) | Weight (kg) | Birth date |
|---|---|---|---|---|---|
| 1 | (Albania) Erblira Bici | Opposite | 1.85 | | 27 June 1995 (age 30) |
| 2 | (Bosnia and Herzegovina) Sonja Milanović | Outside Hitter | 1.87 | 72 | 11 January 1992 (age 34) |
| 3 | (Greece) Maria Nomikou | Outside Hitter | 1.90 | 80 | 30 March 1993 (age 32) |
| 4 | (Italy) Angelica Costamagna | Outside Hitter | 1.75 | | 29 March 1999 (age 26) |
| 5 | (Italy) Roberta Carraro | Setter | 1.81 | | 17 November 1998 (age 27) |
| 6 | (Italy) Sofia D'Odorico | Outside Hitter | 1.86 | 78 | 6 January 1997 (age 29) |
| 8 | (Italy) Celeste Poma | Libero | 1.68 | 58 | 10 November 1991 (age 34) |
| 9 | (Italy) Chiara Martina | Middle Blocker | 1.87 | | 9 January 1997 (age 29) |
| 10 | (Italy) Karola Dhimitriadhi | Outside Hitter | 1.80 | | 8 May 1996 (age 29) |
| 11 | (Italy) Chiara Borgogno | Middle Blocker | 1.92 | | 8 February 1984 (age 42) |
| 12 | (Italy) Monica Bruno | Middle Blocker | 1.84 | | 2 June 1994 (age 31) |
| 13 | (Italy) Debora Stomeo | Setter | 1.79 | | 4 June 1984 (age 41) |
| 14 | (Italy) Elena Rolando | Libero | 1.65 | | 16 July 1999 (age 26) |
| 15 | (Italy) Bianca Bonelli | Outside Hitter | 1.73 | | 5 June 2000 (age 25) |
| 16 | (Italy) Federica Cane | Outside Hitter | 1.80 | | 7 February 1997 (age 29) |
| 18 | (Italy) Aurora Camperi | Outside Hitter | 1.84 | | 23 August 1997 (age 28) |
