= Asllan Rusi =

Albanian volleyball player (1944-1983)

Personal information
- Full name: Asllan Rusi
- Born: 4 October 1944; Tirana, Albania
- Died: 1 January 1983 (aged 38); Tirana, Albania
- Height: 1.85 m (6 ft 1 in)
- Weight: 70 kg (150 lb)

Career
Years	Teams
1959-1960; 1960-1975; 1975-1976	KV Tirana; Dinamo Tirana; Studenti

National team
1963-1975	Albania

Asllan Rusi (4 October 1944 – 1983) was an Albanian volleyball player who played for Dinamo Tirana and the Albania men's national team. He is memorialized in the naming of the Asllan Rusi Sports Palace, Albania's main indoor sporting arena. He was a 12 time national champion and a 7 time cup winner in Albania and he earned 40 international caps with Albania.
