= Albanian Volleyball League (women) =

- Founded: 1946
- Country: Albania
- Confederation: FIVB
- Divisions: Albanian Volleyball League
- Number of clubs: 12 ( six per division )
- Level on pyramid: 1
- Current champions: KV Tirana
- Broadcaster(s): TVSH and Supersport (highlights)
- Website: Facebook

The Albanian Volleyball League for women is a league competition featuring professional women volleyball clubs from Albania. It was founded in 1946 from the Albanian Federation of Volleyball, several days after the latter was formed. It is the top level volleyball league in Albania from its foundation. The team with the most championships is KV Tirana with 21 trophies won.

The Albanian Volleyball League consists of 12 professional volleyball clubs in Albania and it's one of the oldest volleyball competition in the Balkans having started in 1946. The sport rapidly grew in Albania and by the 70s almost every city and town had its own volleyball club and volleyball field. After communism fell many of the volleyball clubs folded as many players left the country to play for foreign teams. The volleyball attendance decreased and the popularity of this sport fell down worryingly. However, after 1993 volleyball rose up again with many cities re-establishing their teams. Now in Albania there are twelve professional teams while there are plenty of amateur teams ready to enter the league.

== Competition ==
The members of the Albanian Volleyball League are grouped in two divisions: Albanian Volleyball League and B2 League. Each division has six teams and they have to play four times against each other in two different phases during the regular season. In every phase a club plays each of the others twice, once at their home stadium and once at that of their opponents, for a total of 20 games played per season in the regular season.

After the regular season ends, the top four clubs qualify for the play-offs, where the team placed first faces the one placed fourth while the second and the third-placed teams play each other. From these encounters the team that gets first two victories qualifies while games are played once home, once away until the two victories are reached. The teams that win their encounters qualify for the finals which are played in the clubs' respective grounds; the game will once be played home and once away, depending on the draw. The first team that gets three victories is crowned as champion.

Clubs that win get two points and the ones that lose get one point. At the end of the regular season, the bottom two clubs miss the play-offs. The bottom club gets relegated while the fifth-placed club will play the second-placed club of the B2 League. The team that wins the play-out has the right to play in Albanian Volleyball League.

== Winners ==
These are the winners of the Albanian Volleyball League

Season	Champion
1946	17 Nëntori
1947	Vllaznia Shkodër
1948	17 Nëntori
1949	Teuta
1950	17 Nëntori
1951	17 Nëntori
1952	17 Nëntori
1953	Studenti Tiranë
1954	Partizani Tirana
1955	17 Nëntori
1956	Studenti Korçë
1957	Vllaznia Shkodër
1958	Skënderbeu Korçë
1959	17 Nëntori
1960	Vllaznia Shkodër
1961	17 Nëntori
1962	17 Nëntori
1963	17 Nëntori (*)
1964	17 Nëntori
1965	Flamurtari Vlorë
1966	17 Nëntori
1967	17 Nëntori
1969	17 Nëntori
1970	Studenti Tiranë
1971	Studenti Tiranë
1972	Skënderbeu Korçë
1973	Skënderbeu Korçë
1974	KS Dinamo
1975	KS Dinamo
1976	KS Dinamo
1977	KS Dinamo
1978	KS Dinamo
1979	KS Dinamo
1980	KS Dinamo
1981	KS Dinamo
1982	KS Dinamo
1983	KS Dinamo (*)
1984	KS Dinamo
1985	Skënderbeu Korçë
1986	Skënderbeu Korçë
1987	KS Dinamo
1988	KS Dinamo
1989	KS Dinamo
1990	KS Dinamo
1991	KS Dinamo
1992	Tirana
1993	SK Lushnja
1994	Tirana
1995	KS Dinamo
1996	SK Lushnja
1997	SK Lushnja
1998	SK Lushnja
1999	Teuta
2000	Teuta
2001	Teuta
2002	KS Dinamo
2003	Studenti Tiranë
2004	KS Dinamo
2005	Studenti Tiranë
2006	Teuta
2007	KS Dinamo (**)
2008	Tirana
2009	Tirana
2010	Tirana
2011	Minatori
2012	Minatori
2013	Tirana (**)
2014	UMB Volej
2015	UMB Volej
2016	UMB Volej
2017	UMB Volej
2018	Partizani Tirana
2019	Partizani Tirana
2020	cancelled due to pandemic
2021	Partizani Tirana
2022	Skënderbeu Korçë
2023	Partizani Tirana
2024	Skënderbeu Korçë
2025	Tirana

=== Trophy Ranking ===
KV Tirana 21 times

KS Dinamo 20 times

Skënderbeu Korçë (Studenti Korçë) 8 times

Studenti Tiranë 5 times

Partizani Tirana 5 times

Teuta 5 times

SK Lushnja 4 times

UMB Volej 4 times

Vllaznia Shkodër 3 times

Minatori 2 times

Flamurtari Vlorë 1 time

== See also ==
- Albanian Volleyball Cup (Women)
- Albanian Volleyball Supercup (Women)
