= Albanian Volleyball Cup (women) =

The Albanian Volleyball Cup (women) is a competition featuring female professional volleyball clubs from Albania and the second important event after Albanian Volleyball League. It was founded in 1954 from the Albanian Federation of Volleyball. The team with the most trophies is KS Dinamo with 21 cups.

== Winners ==
These are the winners of the Albanian Volleyball Cup.

Season	Cup Winner
1954	Partizani Tirana
1956	Skënderbeu Korçë
1957	Puna Tiranë/17 Nëntori
1960	17 Nëntori
1961	17 Nëntori
1962	Vllaznia Shkodër
1963	Vllaznia Shkodër
1964	Vllaznia Shkodër
1965	17 Nëntori
1966	17 Nëntori
1967	17 Nëntori
1968	17 Nëntori
1969	Studenti Tiranë
1970	Studenti Tiranë
1971	Skënderbeu Korçë
1972	Skënderbeu Korçë
1973	Skënderbeu Korçë
1974	KS Dinamo
1975	Skënderbeu Korçë
1976	Skënderbeu Korçë
1977	KS Dinamo
1978	Skënderbeu Korçë
1979	Flamurtari Vlorë
1980	KS Dinamo
1981	KS Dinamo
1982	KS Dinamo
1983	KS Dinamo
1984	KS Dinamo
1985	KS Dinamo
1986	KS Dinamo
1987	KS Dinamo (*)
1988	KS Dinamo
1989	KS Dinamo
1990	KS Dinamo
1991	KS Dinamo
1992	Teuta
1993	Elbasani
1994	KS Dinamo
1995	KS Dinamo
1996	Olimpik
1997	Lushnja
1998	Lushnja
1999	Teuta
2000	Teuta
2001	KS Dinamo
2002	KS Dinamo
2003	KS Dinamo (**)
2004	Studenti Tiranë
2005	Studenti Tiranë
2006	KS Dinamo
2007	Teuta
2008	Tirana
2009	Universiteti “Marin Barleti” Tiranë
2010	Universiteti “Marin Barleti” Tiranë
2011	Minatori
2012	Tirana
2013	Tirana (*)
2014	Universiteti “Marin Barleti” Tiranë
2015	Universiteti “Marin Barleti” Tiranë
2016	Universiteti “Marin Barleti” Tiranë
2017	Universiteti “Marin Barleti” Tiranë
2018	Partizani Tirana
2019	Partizani Tirana
2020	Universiteti “Marin Barleti” Tiranë
2021	Partizani Tirana
2022	Tirana
2023	Skënderbeu Korçë
2024	Skënderbeu Korçë
2025	Tirana

=== Trophy Ranking ===
KS Dinamo 21 times

KV Tirana 12 times

Skënderbeu Korçë 9 times

Universiteti “Marin Barleti” Tiranë 7 times

Teuta 4 times

Partizani Tirana 4 times

Vllaznia Shkodër 3 times

Studenti Tiranë 4 times

SK Lushnja 2 times

Minatori 1 times

Flamurtari Vlorë 1 time

KS Elbasani 1 time

== See also ==
- Albanian Volleyball League (Women)
- Albanian Volleyball Supercup (Women)
- Nationwide Volleyball Supercup (Women)
