= Albanian Volleyball Cup =

- Sport: Volleyball
- Founded: 1954
- Country: Albania
- Confederation: (European Union) CEV
- Most recent champions: Tirana (10th title)
- Most titles: Dinamo (18 titles)
- Broadcasters: RTSH; TeleSport
- Related competitions: Albanian League; Albanian Supercup
- Website: fshfv.org

The Albanian Volleyball Cup is the top annual national men's volleyball cup competition in Albania. It was founded in 1954 by the Albanian Basketball Association and the club with the most titles is Dinamo, who have won the competition on 18 occasions.

== Title holders ==
- 1954 Partizani
- 1956 Dinamo
- 1957 Spartaku
- 1958 17 Nëntori
- 1960 Partizani
- 1961 Dinamo
- 1962 Dinamo
- 1963 Partizani
- 1964 17 Nëntori
- 1965 Dinamo
- 1966 Dajti
- 1967 Dinamo
- 1968 Dinamo
- 1968–69 Vllaznia
- 1969–70 Vllaznia
- 1970–71 Partizani
- 1971–72 Dinamo
- 1972–73 Vllaznia
- 1973–74 Partizani
- 1974–75 Dinamo
- 1975–76 Dinamo
- 1976–77 Partizani
- 1977–78 Dinamo (*)
- 1978–79 Dinamo
- 1979–80 Dinamo
- 1980–81 Dinamo
- 1981–82 Partizani
- 1982–83 Dinamo
- 1983–84 Dinamo
- 1984–85 Vllaznia
- 1985–86 Dinamo
- 1986–87 17 Nëntori
- 1987–88 Vllaznia
- 1988–89 Vllaznia
- 1989–90 Dinamo
- 1990–91 17 Nëntori
- 1991–92 Tirana
- 1992–93 Partizani
- 1993–94 Partizani
- 1994–95 Studenti
- 1995–96 Tirana
- 1996–97 Studenti
- 1997–98 Erzeni
- 1998–99 Erzeni
- 1999–00 Teuta
- 2000–01 Studenti
- 2001–02 Studenti
- 2002–03 Dinamo
- 2003–04 Studenti
- 2004–05 Studenti
- 2005–06 Studenti
- 2006–07 Studenti
- 2007–08 Studenti
- 2008–09 Teuta
- 2009–10 Studenti (*)
- 2010–11 Studenti
- 2011–12 Studenti
- 2012–13 Studenti
- 2013–14 Studenti
- 2014–15 Studenti
- 2015–16 Studenti
- 2016–17 Partizani (*)
- 2017–18 Partizani
- 2018–19 Erzeni
- 2019–20 Partizani
- 2020–21 Partizani
- 2021–22 Tirana
- 2022–23 Tirana
- 2023–24 Partizani
- 2024–25 Partizani
- 2025–26 Tirana (*)

== Performance by club ==
Club	Winner	Years
Dinamo	18	1956, 1961, 1962, 1965, 1967, 1968, 1971–72, 1974–75, 1975–76, 1977–78, 1978–79, 1979–80, 1980–81, 1982–83, 1983–84, 1985–86, 1989–90, 2002–03
Studenti	16	1994–95, 1996–97, 2000–01, 2001–02, 2003–04, 2004–05, 2005–06, 2006–07, 2007–08, 2009–10, 2010–11, 2011–12, 2012–13, 2013–14, 2014–15, 2015–16
Partizani	15	1954, 1960, 1963, 1970–71, 1973–74, 1976–77, 1981–82, 1992–93, 1993–94, 2016-17, 2017-18, 2019-20, 2020-21, 2023-24, 2024-25
Tirana	10	1957, 1958, 1964, 1986–87, 1990–91, 1991–92, 1995–96, 2021-22, 2022-23, 2025-26
Vllaznia	6	1968–69, 1969–70, 1972–73, 1984–85, 1987–88, 1988–89
Erzeni	3	1997–98, 1998–99, 2018-19
Teuta	2	1999–00, 2008–09
Dajti	1	1966

== See also ==
- Albanian Volleyball League
- Albanian Volleyball Supercup
- Nationwide Volleyball Supercup
