= Nationwide Volleyball Supercup =

The Nationwide Volleyball Supercup is a competition featuring professional men volleyball clubs from Albania, North Macedonia and Kosovo and consists in 4 teams playing in a direct elimination through semi-finals and the final. The team with the most trophies is KV Shkëndija of Tetovo with 4 cups. They won the most recent final against Studenti Tirana of Albania, played in Tirana by scoreline 3-0 (25:15, 25:20, 25:23).

== Winners ==
These are the winners of the Nationwide Volleyball Supercup

Season	Cup Winner
2008	KV Shkëndija
2009	KV Shkëndija
2011	KV Shkëndija
2014	KV Shkëndija

=== Trophy Ranking ===
KV Shkëndija 4 times

- There are data missing for this tournament, updates will follow in the due course.

== See also ==
- Nationwide Volleyball Supercup (Women)
- Albanian Volleyball Supercup
- Albanian Volleyball Cup
