= Flamurtari Sports Palace =

Indoor sporting arena in Vlorë, Albania

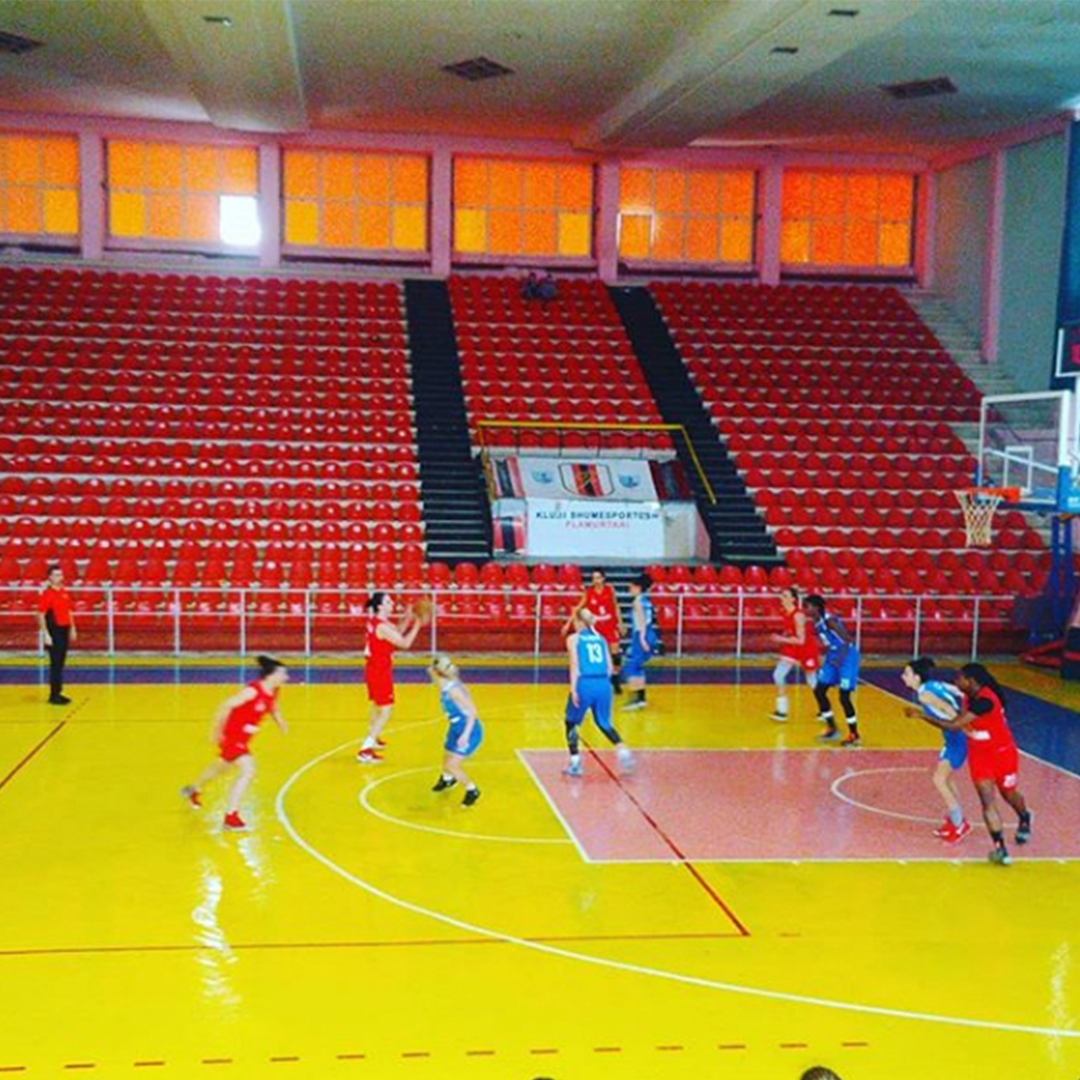
- KB Flamurtari women's against KB Teuta women's in March 2019
- Interactive map of Flamurtari Sports Palace
- Full name: Pallati Sportit Flamurtari
- Coordinates: 40.4550°N 19.4875°E
- Owner: Municipality of Vlorë
- Capacity: 2,040
- Surface: Parquet Floor

Construction
- Groundbreaking: 1978
- Built: June 1979
- Opened: 25 September 1979
- Architect: Semih Pashallari

Tenants
- KB Flamurtari (men's); KBF Flamurtari (women's); Flamurtari Volleyball (men's); Flamurtari Volleyball (women's); Flamurtari Futsal

Flamurtari Sports Palace is an indoor sporting arena located in Vlorë, Albania. Built in 1979, it is located next to Flamurtari Stadium and houses the offices of Flamurtari Sports Club. The arena has a capacity of 2,040 and hosts a range of indoor sports including basketball, volleyball, futsal and boxing.

== Events ==
The play-off of the 2023–24 Liga Unike was held in the Flamurtari Sports Palace.
