= Albanian Basketball Supercup (women) =

Albanian Basketball Supercup is an event started only from 1999 and involves the Albanian Basketball League champions and Albanian Basketball Cup winners of the previous season. The Supercup consists in a single match which is always played the year after major events have ended and right before the new season start.

The team with most trophies is PBC Flamurtari with 15 Supercups. Most recent trophy was won from PBC Flamurtari.

== Winners ==
Season	Supercup Winners
1999	Skënderbeu Korçë
2000	Skënderbeu Korçë
2001	PBC Flamurtari
2002	BC Luftëtari
2003	PBC Tirana
2004	BC Luftëtari
2005	PBC Flamurtari
2006	PBC Flamurtari
2007	PBC Flamurtari
2008	PBC Flamurtari
2009	PBC Flamurtari
2010	PBC Flamurtari
2011	PBC Flamurtari
2012	PBC Flamurtari
2013	B.C Apolonia
2014	PBC Flamurtari (*)
2015	PBC Flamurtari
2016	PBC Tirana
2017	PBC Flamurtari
2018	PBC Tirana
2019	PBC Flamurtari
2020	-
2021	B.C Partizani
2022	PBC Flamurtari
2023	B.C Partizani
2024	PBC Flamurtari

== Performance by club ==
PBC Flamurtari 15 times

PBC Tirana 3 times

Skënderbeu Korçë 2 times

BC Luftëtari 2 times

B.C Partizani 2 times

B.C Apolonia 1 time
