= Gaia Giovannini =

Italian volleyball player (born 2001)

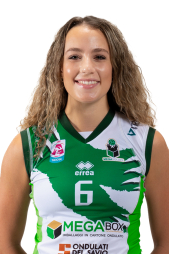

Personal information
- Born: 17 December 2001 (age 24); San Giovanni in Persiceto, Emilia-Romagna, Italy
- Height: 1.82 m (6 ft 0 in)

Volleyball information
- Position: Outside hitter
- Current club: Megavolley
- Number: 12

Career
Years
- 2019–2020
- 2020–2022
- 2022–2023
- 2023–
Teams
- Montale
- Cuneo Granda
- AGIL
- Megavolley

National team
Italy
Honours
Women's volleyball
Representing Italy
Olympic Games
Gold medal – first place	2024 Paris	Team
FIVB World Championship
Gold medal – first place	2025 Thailand	Team
FIVB Nations League
Gold medal – first place	2024 Bangkok	Team
Gold medal – first place	2025 Łódź	Team
Bronze medal – third place	2026 Macau	Team
European Championship
Silver medal – second place	2026 Azerbaijan-Czechia-Sweden-Turkey	Team

Gaia Giovannini (born 17 December 2001) is an Italian volleyball player who plays for Megavolley as an outside hitter with jersey number 12.

== Career ==
=== Clubs ===
Giovannini's career began in the 2019–20 season in Montale, in Serie A2. In the 2020–21 season she was hired by Cuneo Granda, making her debut in Serie A1, the same category where she played in the 2022–23 season wearing the AGIL jersey and in the 2023–24 season with Megavolley.

=== National team ===
In 2024, Giovannini received her first call-ups to the senior national team, with whom she won gold at the Volleyball Nations League and the Summer Olympics, both in 2024. In 2025, Giovannini won gold at the Volleyball Nations League and at the World Championship.

== Awards ==
=== National team ===
- 2024 Nations League – Gold medal
- 2024 Olympic Games – Gold medal
- 2025 Nations League – Gold medal
- 2025 World Championship – Gold medal
