= Maria Nomikou =

Greek volleyball player (born 1993)

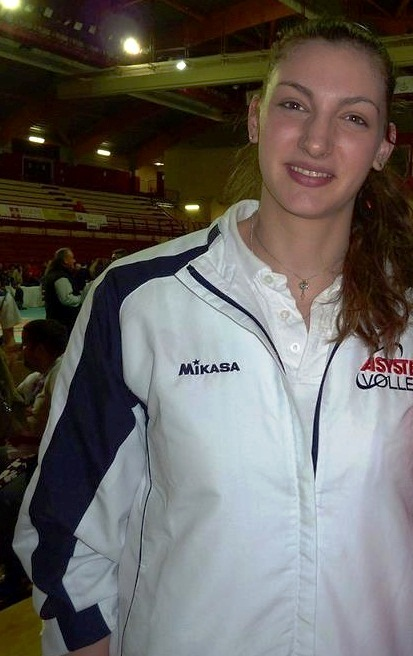

Personal information
- Nationality: Greece
- Born: March 30, 1993 (age 33); Athens, Greece
- Height: 1.94 m (6 ft 4 in)
- Weight: 77 kg (170 lb)
- Spike: 2.89 m (9 ft 6 in)
- Block: 2.82 m (9 ft 3 in)

Volleyball information
- Position: Opposite hitter
- Current club: Panionios Nea Smyrni
- Number: 3

Career
Years	Teams
2004–2011; 2011–2012; 2012–2013; 2013–2015; 2015–2016; 2016–2017; 2017; 2017–2019; 2019–2020; 2020–2021; 2021; 2021–2022; 2022–2024; 2024–	(Greece) Iraklis Kifisias (Italy) Asystel Novara (Italy) GSO Villa Cortese (Italy) US Victoria Monza (Greece) Panathinaikos Athens (Italy) Trentino Rosa (Italy) Pallavolo Mondovì (Greece) Olympiacos Piraeus (Greece) AEK Athens (Greece) Apollonios Keratsini (Piraeus) (Greece) Olympiacos Piraeus; Administrative position in Apollonios (Greece) Amazones Nea Erythraia (Greece) Panionios Nea Smyrni

National team
(Greece) Hellas - 47 caps (05.2018)
- Last updated: 24 August 2024

Maria Nomikou (Greek: Μαρία Νομικού; born March 30, 1993, in Athens, Greece) is a female professional volleyball player from Greece, who used to be a member of the Greece women's national volleyball team.

== Sporting achievements ==
=== Clubs ===
==== International competitions ====
- 2017/2018: CEV Women's Challenge Cup, with Olympiacos S.F. Piraeus

==== National championships ====
- 2017/2018 Hellenic Championship, with Olympiacos Piraeus
- 2018/2019 Hellenic Championship, with Olympiacos Piraeus

==== National trophies ====
- 2012/2013 Cup of Italy, with G.S.O. Villa Cortese
- 2017/2018 Hellenic Cup, with Olympiacos Piraeus
- 2018/2019 Hellenic Cup, with Olympiacos Piraeus

==== National Super Cups ====
- 2011/2012 Super Cup of Italy, with G.S.O. Villa Cortese
