= Megavolley =

Italian women's volleyball club

- Full name: Megabox Volley Vallefoglia
- Founded: 2019
- Ground: PalaMegabox; Pesaro, Italy (Capacity: 2,001)
- Chairman: Ivano Angeli
- Head coach: Andrea Pistola
- League: FIPAV Women's Serie A1
- Website: Club home page

Uniforms
Home	Away

Megavolley, also known as Megabox Volley Vallefoglia, is an Italian professional women's volleyball club based in Vallefoglia. The team currently plays in the Serie A1, Italy's highest professional league.

== Previous names ==
Due to sponsorship, the club has competed under the following names:

- Megabox Battistelli Vallefoglia (2019–2020)
- Megabox Vallefoglia (2020–2021)
- Megabox Ondulati del Savio Vallefoglia (2021–present)

== History ==
Megavolley was founded in 2019 and for its debut season (2019–2020) the club acquired the rights to play in Serie B1 from Volley Ospitaletto. Megavolley was in second place in the standings, just three points from the leading team, when the season was canceled due to the COVID-19 pandemic. After missing the chance to play for a promotion to Serie A2 the club decided to acquire the rights to play in Serie A2 from P2P Baronissi.

In its first season (2020–2021) in Serie A2, Megavolley finished the regular season in Pool East in first place. In the subsequent promotion pool play the club finished in third place and was qualified for the playoffs. In the final, Megavolley defeated Union Volley Pinerolo and was promoted to Serie A1 for the 2021–2022 season.

In the 2023–2024 season of Serie A1, Megavolley finished the regular season in seventh place and was for the first time qualified for the championship playoffs. In March 2026, the club claimed its first European trophy by winning the 2025–26 CEV Challenge Cup.

== Team ==
2026–2027 Team
Number	Player	Position	Height (m)	Birth date
1	(Albania) Erblira Bici	Opposite	1.85	27 June 1995 (age 31)
3	(Italy) Alessia Bolzonetti	Outside Hitter	1.87	15 February 2002 (age 24)
4	(United States) Tai Bierria	Outside Hitter	1.86	9 March 1997 (age 29)
5	(Italy) Sophie Andrea Blasi	Libero	1.77	16 December 2002 (age 23)
6	(Italy) Gaia Giovannini	Outside Hitter	1.82	17 December 2001 (age 24)
7	(Italy) Chiara De Bortoli	Libero	1.76	28 July 1997 (age 29)
8	(Italy) Sonia Candi (c)	Middle Blocker	1.87	8 November 1993 (age 32)
9	(United States) Alexandra Frantti	Outside Hitter	1.85	3 March 1996 (age 30)
10	(Italy) Ulrike Bridi	Setter	1.82	24 July 1998 (age 28)
11	(Russia) Elizaveta Kochurina	Middle Blocker	1.90	1 October 2002 (age 23)
12	(Spain) Lucía Varela	Middle Blocker	1.97	10 August 2003 (age 23)
13	(France) Lara Davidović	Opposite	1.85	13 December 1997 (age 28)
14	(United States) Jenna Gray	Setter	1.86	28 February 1998 (age 28)
21	(Italy) Loveth Omoruyi	Outside Hitter	1.84	25 August 2002 (age 24)

2025–2026 Team
Number	Player	Position	Height (m)	Birth date
1	(Albania) Erblira Bici	Opposite	1.85	27 June 1995 (age 31)
4	(Italy) Alice Feduzzi	Libero	1.64	14 September 2006 (age 20)
5	(Italy) Federica Carletti	Outside Hitter	1.84	14 March 2000 (age 26)
6	(Italy) Gaia Giovannini	Outside Hitter	1.82	17 December 2001 (age 24)
7	(Italy) Chiara De Bortoli	Libero	1.76	28 July 1997 (age 29)
8	(Italy) Sonia Candi (c)	Middle Blocker	1.87	8 November 1993 (age 32)
9	(Italy) Valentina Bartolucci	Setter	1.81	20 May 2003 (age 23)
11	(Canada) Nyadholi Thokbuom	Middle Blocker	1.86	9 June 2000 (age 26)
14	(Croatia) Božana Butigan	Middle Blocker	1.92	19 August 2000 (age 26)
16	(Bulgaria) Tsvetomira Mitkova	Middle Blocker	1.87	16 August 2004 (age 22)
19	(Romania) Adelina Ungureanu	Outside Hitter	1.87	29 July 2000 (age 26)
20	(Bulgaria) Mikaela Stoyanova	Opposite	1.93	23 June 2005 (age 21)
21	(Italy) Loveth Omoruyi	Outside Hitter	1.84	25 August 2002 (age 24)
22	(Spain) Raquel Lázaro	Setter	1.84	4 January 2000 (age 26)

2024–2025 Team
Number	Player	Position	Height (m)	Birth date
1	(Albania) Erblira Bici	Opposite	1.85	27 June 1995 (age 31)
2	(Italy) Alice Degradi	Outside Hitter	1.81	10 April 1996 (age 30)
4	(Italy) Alice Feduzzi	Libero	1.64	14 September 2006 (age 20)
5	(Italy) Francesca Michieletto	Outside Hitter	1.84	10 September 1997 (age 29)
6	(Italy) Gaia Giovannini	Outside Hitter	1.82	17 December 2001 (age 24)
7	(Italy) Chiara De Bortoli	Libero	1.76	28 July 1997 (age 29)
8	(Italy) Sonia Candi (c)	Middle Blocker	1.87	8 November 1993 (age 32)
9	(Italy) Alice Torcolacci	Middle Blocker	1.84	27 February 2000 (age 26)
10	(Serbia) Rada Perović	Setter	1.82	13 April 2001 (age 25)
~~11~~	(Switzerland) ~~Maja Storck~~ (Note: Maja Storck left the team on 25 November 2024.)	~~Opposite~~	~~1.83~~	~~8 October 1998 (age 27)~~
13	(Russia) Viktoriia Kobzar	Setter	1.84	16 October 2004 (age 21)
17	(Germany) Camilla Weitzel	Middle Blocker	1.95	11 June 2000 (age 26)
22	(United States) Simone Lee	Outside Hitter	1.88	7 September 1996 (age 30)
23	(Latvia) Irbe Lazda (Note: Irbe Lazda joined the team on 17 December 2024.)	Opposite	1.90	4 March 2001 (age 25)
55	(Italy) Federica Carletti (Note: Federica Carletti joined the team on 12 December 2024.)	Outside Hitter	1.84	14 March 2000 (age 26)

2023–2024 Team
Number	Player	Position	Height (m)	Birth date
1	(Italy) Claudia Provaroni	Libero	1.81	14 May 1998 (age 28)
2	(Italy) Alice Degradi	Outside Hitter	1.81	10 April 1996 (age 30)
~~5~~	(Italy) ~~Viola Passaro~~ (Note: Viola Passaro left the team on 11 December 2023.)	~~Setter~~	~~1.82~~	~~30 November 2004 (age 21)~~
6	(Italy) Agnese Cecconello	Middle Blocker	1.90	6 November 1999 (age 26)
7	(Italy) Sara Panetoni	Libero	1.74	6 May 2000 (age 26)
8	(Serbia) Maja Aleksić	Middle Blocker	1.88	6 June 1997 (age 29)
9	(Italy) Camilla Mingardi	Opposite	1.86	19 October 1997 (age 28)
10	(Germany) Lena Große Scharmann	Opposite	1.84	24 April 1998 (age 28)
11	(Italy) Giulia Mancini	Middle Blocker	1.83	23 May 1998 (age 28)
12	(Italy) Gaia Giovannini	Outside Hitter	1.82	17 December 2001 (age 24)
13	(Russia) Viktoriia Kobzar (Note: Viktoriia Kobzar joined the team on 14 December 2023.)	Setter	1.84	16 October 2004 (age 21)
14	(Netherlands) Laura Dijkema	Setter	1.84	18 February 1990 (age 36)
15	(Russia) Tatiana Kosheleva (c)	Outside Hitter	1.91	23 December 1988 (age 37)
16	(Italy) Beatrice Gardini	Outside Hitter	1.84	1 April 2003 (age 23)

2022–2023 Team
Number	Player	Position	Height (m)	Birth date
1	(Italy) Vittoria Piani	Opposite	1.87	12 February 1998 (age 28)
3	(Italy) Eleonora Furlan (Note: Eleonora Furlan joined the team in early January 2023.)	Middle Blocker	1.88	10 March 1995 (age 31)
~~4~~	(Italy) ~~Giulia Carraro~~ (Note: Giulia Carraro left the team on 28 December 2022.)	~~Setter~~	~~1.75~~	~~25 July 1994 (age 32)~~
5	(United States) Andrea Drews (Note: Andrea Drews joined the team in early January 2023.)	Opposite	1.91	25 December 1993 (age 32)
6	(Italy) Sofia D'Odorico	Outside Hitter	1.86	6 January 1997 (age 29)
7	(Italy) Imma Sirressi	Libero	1.75	19 May 1990 (age 36)
8	(Serbia) Maja Aleksić	Middle Blocker	1.88	6 June 1997 (age 29)
9	(Italy) Valeria Papa	Outside Hitter	1.83	9 September 1989 (age 37)
~~10~~	(Italy) ~~Melissa Martinelli~~ (Note: Melissa Martinelli left the team on 16 December 2022.)	~~Middle Blocker~~	~~1.90~~	~~23 March 1993 (age 33)~~
11	(Italy) Giulia Mancini	Middle Blocker	1.83	23 May 1998 (age 28)
12	(United States) Micha Hancock	Setter	1.80	10 November 1992 (age 33)
13	(Italy) Emma Barbero	Libero	1.70	2 February 2004 (age 22)
14	(Italy) Beatrice Berti	Middle Blocker	1.93	12 January 1996 (age 30)
15	(Russia) Tatiana Kosheleva (c)	Outside Hitter	1.91	23 December 1988 (age 37)
~~19~~	(United States) ~~Merete Lutz~~ (Note: Merete Lutz left the team on 28 December 2022.)	~~Opposite~~	~~2.08~~	~~7 November 1994 (age 31)~~
22	(Spain) Raquel Lázaro (Note: Raquel Lázaro joined the team in early January 2023.)	Setter	1.84	4 January 2000 (age 26)

2021–2022 Team
Number	Player	Position	Height (m)	Birth date
2	(Italy) Francesca Scola	Setter	1.83	15 September 2001 (age 25)
3	(Italy) Silvia Fiori	Libero	1.62	18 July 1994 (age 32)
6	(Italy) Giada Cecchetto	Libero	1.64	6 June 1991 (age 35)
7	(Cuba) Kenia Carcaces	Outside Hitter	1.89	23 January 1986 (age 40)
8	(Trinidad and Tobago) Sinead Jack-Kisal	Middle Blocker	1.98	8 November 1993 (age 32)
9	(Finland) Kaisa Alanko (Note: Kaisa Alanko joined the team on 12 January 2022.)	Setter	1.75	3 January 1993 (age 33)
10	(Serbia) Ana Bjelica (Note: Ana Bjelica joined the team on 26 October 2021.)	Opposite	1.91	3 April 1992 (age 34)
11	(Italy) Giulia Mancini	Middle Blocker	1.83	23 May 1998 (age 28)
14	(Italy) Alexandra Botezat	Middle Blocker	1.96	3 August 1998 (age 28)
15	(Russia) Tatiana Kosheleva (c)	Outside Hitter	1.91	23 December 1988 (age 37)
16	(United States) Sonja Newcombe	Outside Hitter	1.88	7 March 1988 (age 38)
17	(Italy) Virginia Berasi	Setter	1.70	17 February 1994 (age 32)
18	(Italy) Dayana Kosareva	Outside Hitter	1.86	24 August 1999 (age 27)
22	(Italy) Viola Tonello	Middle Blocker	1.84	3 January 1994 (age 32)

2020–2021 Team
Number	Player	Position	Height (m)	Birth date
1	(Italy) Giulia Bresciani	Libero	1.65	27 September 1992 (age 34)
2	(Italy) Lucia Bacchi	Outside Hitter	1.80	4 January 1981 (age 45)
3	(United States) Rachael Kramer	Middle Blocker	2.08	15 March 1998 (age 28)
4	(Italy) Chiara Costagli	Outside Hitter	1.88	17 July 1998 (age 28)
5	(Italy) Martina Balboni	Setter	1.80	29 January 1991 (age 35)
~~6~~	(Italy) ~~Laura Saccomani~~ (Note: Laura Saccomani left the team on 16 December 2020.)	~~Outside Hitter~~	~~1.89~~	~~8 October 1991 (age 34)~~
7	(Italy) Alice Stafoggia	Outside Hitter	1.84	30 March 2002 (age 24)
8	(Italy) Alessandra Colzi	Middle Blocker	1.80	1 May 1997 (age 29)
10	(Italy) Alice Pamio	Outside Hitter	1.81	15 January 1998 (age 28)
11	(Italy) Ilaria Durante	Setter	1.78	11 May 2003 (age 23)
12	(Italy) Silvia Bertaiola	Middle Blocker	1.84	28 February 1993 (age 33)
14	(Italy) Elena Ricci	Middle Blocker	1.85	11 November 1998 (age 27)
18	(Croatia) Barbara Đapić (Note: Barbara Đapić joined the team on 16 December 2020.)	Opposite	1.94	11 March 1995 (age 31)

== Head coaches ==
Period	Head coach
2019–2022	(Italy) Fabio Bonafede
2022–2023	(Italy) Andrea Mafrici
2023–	(Italy) Andrea Pistola

== Honours ==
=== International competitions ===
- CEV Challenge Cup: 1

2025–26
