= Albanian Basketball Federation =

- Founded: 1946; 76 years ago
- Affiliation: FIBA
- Affiliation date: 1947; 75 years ago
- Regional affiliation: FIBA Europe
- Affiliation date: 1947; 75 years ago
- Headquarters: Tirana, Albania
- President: Avni Ponari

Official website
- fshb.basketball

The Albanian Basketball Federation (Albanian: Federata Shqiptare e Basketbollit; FSHB) is the governing body of basketball in Albania, based in Tirana. It organises the national basketball leagues of the Albanian Superliga, the First Division, the Albanian Cup and Supercup. Albania women's national basketball team, Albanian women's basketball league, Albanian Women's Cup and the Albanian Women's Supercup are also overseen. It also coordinates the activities of the Albania national basketball team and the Albania national youth basketball teams such as, Under-20, Under-18 and Under-16.

== Presidents ==
| No. | Name | Term in office | |
Albanian Games Federation (1964–90)
| 1 | Aranit Çela | 1964 | 1980 |
| 2 | Thoma Kuke | 1980 | 1988 |
| 3 | Ilia Kongo | 1988 | 1990 |
Albanian Basketball Federation (1990–present)
| 4 | Qemal Shalsi | 1990 | 1992 |
| 5 | Feti Borova | 1992 | 1995 |
| 6 | Qemal Disha | 1995 | 1996 |
| 7 | Vehbi Alimuça | 1996 | 1997 |
| 8 | Gjergj Ndrio | 1997 | 1999 |
| 9 | Marsel Skëndo | 2000 | 2004 |
| 10 | Dritan Çelaj | 2004 | 2007 |
| 11 | Avni Ponari | 2007 | Incumbent |
