= KB Tirana (women) =

KB Tirana women's team

- Nickname: Tirona
- Leagues: Albanian A-1 League; Albanian Basketball Cup
- Founded: 1946
- History: 1946–present
- Arena: Asllan Rusi Palace of Sports
- Location: Tirana, Albania
- Team colors: White & Blue
- Head coach: (Albania) Erdal Borova
- Championships: Albanian A-1 League (42 times)
Home	Away

KB Tirana (women) (Albanian: Klubi i Basketbollit Tirana (femra)) is a basketball team that plays in the Albanian A-1 League. It is the most successful club in the Albanian Women Basketball history, with 42 championships and 72 trophies in total won.

== History ==
On August 16, 1920, the patriot P. Nika altogether with gentlemen A. Erebara, P. Jakova, A. Hoxha, A. Koja, P. Berisha, A. Zajmi, H. Fortuzi, B. Pazari, L. Berisha, S. Frasheri, H. Alizoti, A. Gjitomi and V. Fekeci founded "Agimi Sports Association". In 1927 on the initiative of Mr S. Stermasi, Mr A. Erebara, Mr A. Zajmi and Mr A. Koja, "Agimi" changed its name to Sportklub Tirana (SK Tirana). PBC Tirana Basketball (women) are 41 times Champions of Albania, and also 26 times winners of the Cup, more than any other Albanian club. PBC Tirana have also taken part in some European competitions and in many friendly international tournaments, where occasionally have reached several successes, like winning against very strong opponents BC Levski Sofia in the 1st round of 1994-95 Champions Clubs Cup. PBC Tirana are a legendary club in female basketball of Albania, dominating this discipline throughout the course of the history.

Since 2003, KB Tirana are trying to compete in the highest levels of women's basketball and bid to return in their winning years. They have only won 2 championships, however also have 5 domestic Cups and 3 Supercup trophies from 2003 to date.

Home Court: Asllan Rusi (3.000)

== Domestic achievements ==
Albanian A-1 League Champions - 42 (1947, 1948, 1949, 1950, 1951, 1952, 1953, 1954, 1955, 1956, 1957, 1958, 1959, 1960, 1961, 1962, 1963, 1964, 1966, 1968, 1969, 1970, 1971, 1972, 1973, 1974, 1976,1982, 1983, 1986, 1987, 1988, 1991, 1992, 1993, 1994, 1995, 1997, 1998, 1999, 2019, 2024) (Record)

Albanian Basketball Cup Winners - 27 (1956, 1957, 1960, 1961, 1962, 1965, 1966, 1967, 1968, 1969, 1970, 1971, 1972, 1976, 1977, 1979, 1984, 1986, 1989, 1993, 1995, 1997, 2005, 2013, 2018, 2019, 2025) (Record)

Albanian Basketball Supercup Winners - 3 (2003, 2016, 2018)
