= 1955 Men's European Volleyball Championship =

Tournament details
- Host country: Romania
- Dates: 15–25 June
- Teams: 14
- Venue: 1 (in 1 host city)

Final positions
- Champions: Czechoslovakia (2nd title)
- Runners-up: Romania
- Third place: Bulgaria
- Fourth place: Soviet Union

The 1955 Men's European Volleyball Championship, the fourth edition of the event, was organized by Europe's governing volleyball body, the Confédération Européenne de Volleyball. It was hosted in Bucharest, Romania from 15 to 25 June 1955.

== Teams ==
- Albania
- Austria
- Belgium
- Bulgaria
- Czechoslovakia
- Egypt
- Finland
- France
- Italy
- Yugoslavia
- Poland
- Romania
- Hungary
- USSR

== First round ==
- The top two teams in each pool will qualify for the final round.

=== Pool A ===
Pos	Team	Pld	W	L	Pts	SW	SL	SR	SPW	SPL	SPR	Qualification
1	Soviet Union	3	3	0	6	9	0	MAX	135	60	2.250	Final round
2	France	3	2	1	5	6	3	2.000	118	74	1.595	Final round
3	Albania	3	1	2	4	3	7	0.429	79	139	0.568	
4	Finland	3	0	3	3	1	9	0.111	80	139	0.576	

Source: CEV

Date	Time		Score		Set 1	Set 2	Set 3	Set 4	Set 5	Total	Report
15 Jun		Soviet Union	3–0	Albania	15–8	15–4	15–5			45–17	Report
15 Jun		France	3–0	Finland	15–5	15–6	15–5			45–16	Report
16 Jun		Soviet Union	3–0	Finland	15–4	15–3	15–8			45–15	Report
16 Jun		France	3–0	Albania	15–7	15–4	15–2			45–13	Report
17 Jun		Albania	3–1	Finland	15–13	15–10	4–15	15–11		49–49	Report
17 Jun		Soviet Union	3–0	France	15–10	15–9	15–9			45–28	Report

=== Pool B ===
Pos	Team	Pld	W	L	Pts	SW	SL	SR	SPW	SPL	SPR	Qualification
1	Czechoslovakia	3	3	0	6	9	0	MAX	135	28	4.821	Final round
2	Yugoslavia	3	2	1	5	6	3	2.000	108	71	1.521	Final round
3	Egypt	3	1	2	4	3	7	0.429	74	138	0.536	
4	Austria	3	0	3	3	1	9	0.111	66	146	0.452	

Source: CEV

Date	Time		Score		Set 1	Set 2	Set 3	Set 4	Set 5	Total	Report
15 Jun		Yugoslavia	3–0	Egypt	15–3	15–3	15–5			45–11	Report
15 Jun		Czechoslovakia	3–0	Austria	15–2	15–1	15–0			45–3	Report
16 Jun		Yugoslavia	0–3	Czechoslovakia	13–15	1–15	4–15			18–45	Report
16 Jun		Egypt	3–1	Austria	9–15	15–8	15–10	17–15		56–48	Report
17 Jun		Yugoslavia	3–0	Austria	15–6	15–2	15–7			45–15	Report
17 Jun		Czechoslovakia	3–0	Egypt	15–0	15–0	15–7			45–7	Report

=== Pool C ===
Pos	Team	Pld	W	L	Pts	SW	SL	SR	SPW	SPL	SPR	Qualification
1	Hungary	2	2	0	4	6	2	3.000	111	80	1.388	Final round
2	Bulgaria	2	1	1	3	5	3	1.667	104	92	1.130	Final round
3	Belgium	2	0	2	2	0	6	0.000	47	90	0.522	

Source: CEV

Date	Time		Score		Set 1	Set 2	Set 3	Set 4	Set 5	Total	Report
15 Jun		Hungary	3–0	Belgium	15–10	15–7	15–4			45–21	Report
16 Jun		Hungary	3–2	Bulgaria	15–8	13–15	7–15	15–7	16–14	66–59	Report
17 Jun		Bulgaria	3–0	Belgium	15–10	15–6	15–10			45–26	Report

=== Pool D ===
Pos	Team	Pld	W	L	Pts	SW	SL	SR	SPW	SPL	SPR	Qualification
1	Romania	2	2	0	4	6	2	3.000	100	87	1.149	Final round
2	Poland	2	1	1	3	5	3	1.667	109	80	1.363	Final round
3	Italy	2	0	2	2	0	6	0.000	48	90	0.533	

Source: CEV

Date	Time		Score		Set 1	Set 2	Set 3	Set 4	Set 5	Total	Report
15 Jun		Romania	3–0	Italy	15–9	15–4	15–10			45–23	Report
15 Jun		Poland	3–0	Italy	15–7	15–12	15–9			45–28	Report
17 Jun		Romania	3–2	Poland	15–12	15–12	9–15	10–15	15–11	64–65	Report

== Final ranking ==
Rank	Team
1st place, gold medalist(s)	Czechoslovakia
2nd place, silver medalist(s)	Romania
3rd place, bronze medalist(s)	Bulgaria
4	Soviet Union
5	Yugoslavia
6	Poland
7	Hungary
8	France
9	Italy
10	Albania
11	Finland
12	Belgium
13	Austria
14	Egypt

1955 Men's European champions

Czechoslovakia
Second title
