= Rachael Kramer =

American volleyball player

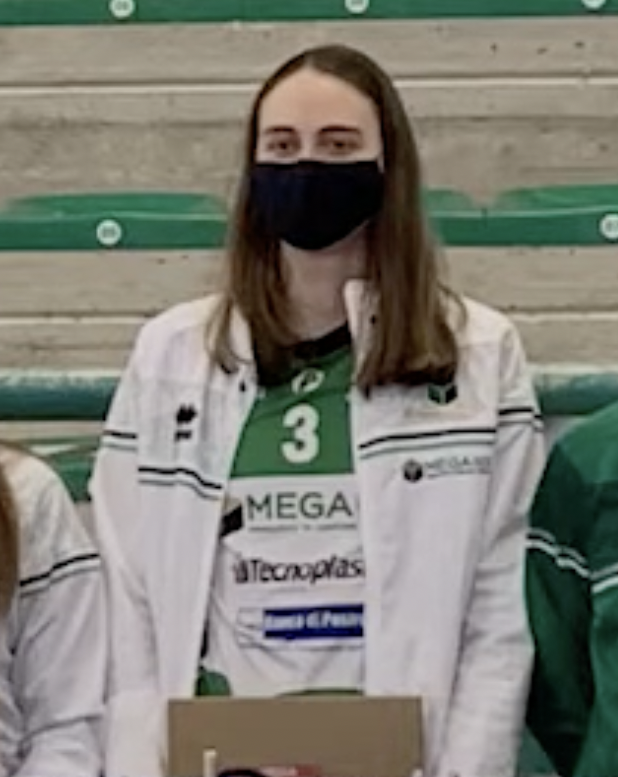
- Kramer in 2020

Personal information
- Full name: Rachael Lynn Kramer
- Nationality: United States
- Born: March 15, 1998 (age 28)
- Hometown: Phoenix, Arizona, U.S.
- Height: 6 ft 8.5 in (204.5 cm)
- Weight: 172 lb (78 kg)
- Spike: 123 in (313 cm)
- Block: 128 in (325 cm)
- Education: Florida (B.A., M.A.)

Volleyball information
- Position: Middle Blocker

Career
| Years | Teams |
|---|---|
| 2016–2019 | (United States) Florida |
| 2020–2021 | (Italy) Megabox Volley Vallefoglia |

National team
| 2021 | United States |
Medal record
Volleyball
Representing the United States
Pan-American Cup
| Bronze medal – third place | 2021 Santo Domingo |

Rachael Lynn Kramer (born March 15, 1998) is an American former professional volleyball player who played as a middle blocker for the United States women's national volleyball team and Italian professional team Megabox Volley Vallefoglia.

== Career ==
=== College ===
Kramer played for the Florida Gators. She helped her team to a runner-up finish in the 2017 NCAA tournament. The same year, she was named an AVCA Third-Team All-American and was named to the all-conference team.

She graduated with a bachelor's degree in marketing in August 2019 and graduated with her master's degree in international business in 2020.

=== Professional clubs ===
- (Italy) Megabox Volley Vallefoglia (2020–2021)

Kramer played her first professional contract with Megabox Vallefoglia for the 2020−2021 season.

=== USA National Team ===
In September 2021, Kramer was selected to represent the U.S. and played in the 2021 NORCECA Championships. She helped the team to a 4th-place finish and was named "Best Middle Blocker" of the tournament.

Kramer also represented the United States at the 2021 Pan-American Cup and won a bronze medal with the team. She had 4 kills and 2 blocks in the bronze medal match against Canada.

== Awards and honors ==
=== Clubs ===
- 2020–2021 Italian Cup Series A2 – Bronze medal, with Megabox Volley Vallefoglia
- 2020–2021 Italian Series A2 League – Silver medal, with Megabox Volley Vallefoglia

=== College ===
- 2018, 2019 AVCA All-America Honorable Mention
- 2017, 2018, 2019, All-SEC
- 2018 AVCA All-America Honorable Mention
- 2018 AVCA All-Region
- 2017 AVCA All-America Third Team
- 2016 SEC All-Freshman Team

=== International ===
- 2021 NORCECA Championships – Best Middle Blocker
