= Albanian Volleyball Supercup (women) =

The Albanian Volleyball Supercup (women) is a competition featuring female professional volleyball clubs from Albania and consists in a single match between League and Cup winners of the season. It was founded in 1954 from the Albanian Federation of Volleyball. The team with the most trophies is KV Tirana with 1 cup*.

== Winners ==
These are the winners of the Albanian Volleyball Supercup

Season	Cup Winner
2014	KV Tirana

=== Trophy Ranking ===
KV Tirana 1 time

- There are data missing for this tournament which will be added in the due course.

== See also ==
- Albanian Volleyball League (women)
- Albanian Volleyball Cup (women)
