= Jenna Gray =

American volleyball player (born 1998)

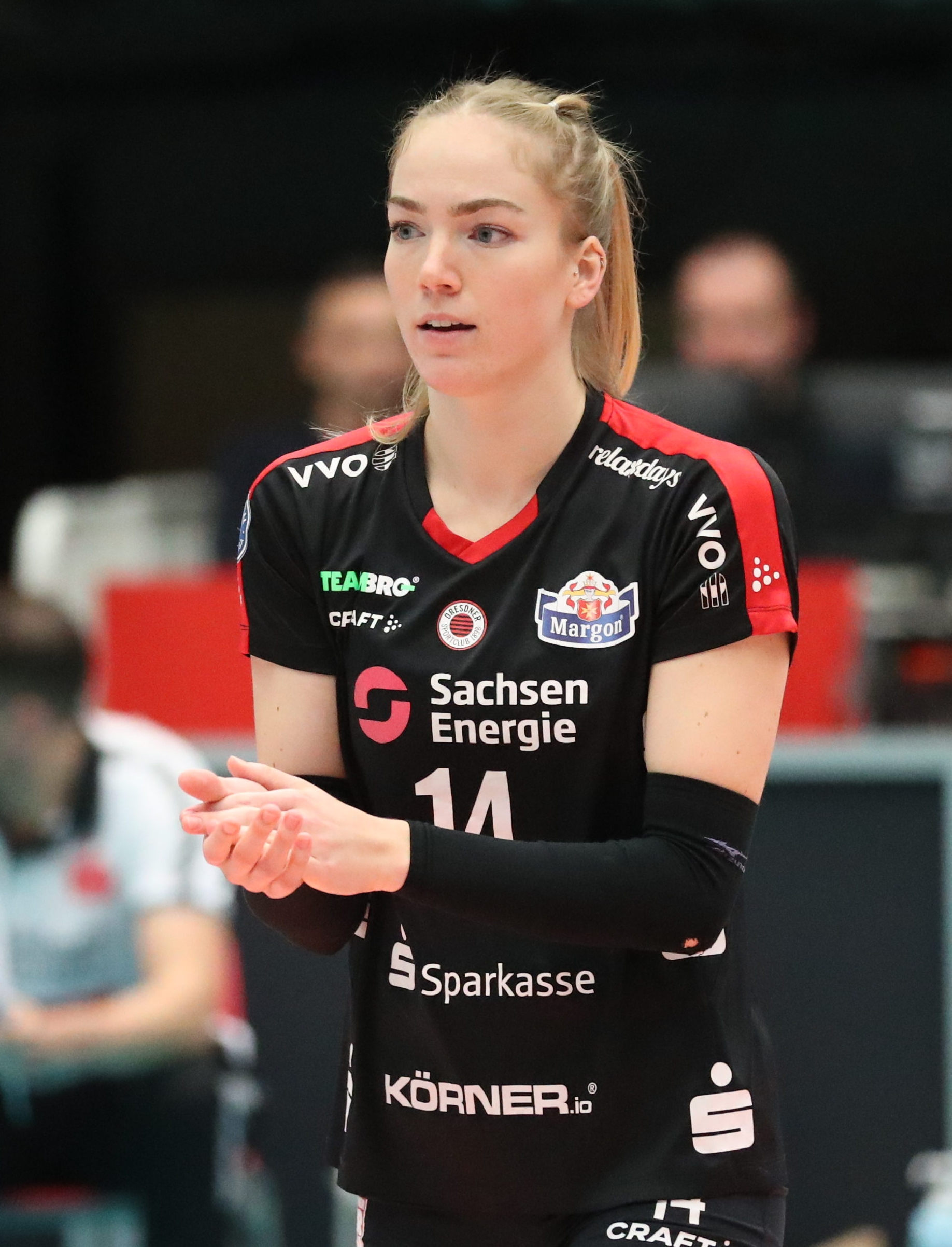
- Jenna Gray (2021)

Personal information
- Full name: Jenna Camille Gray
- Nationality: United States
- Born: February 28, 1998 (age 28)
- Hometown: Shawnee, Kansas
- Height: 6 ft 1 in (185 cm)
- Education: Stanford University

Volleyball information
- Position: Setter
- Current club: Megavolley
- Number: 10

Career
Years	Teams
2016-2020	(United States) Stanford Cardinal
2016-2020	(Germany) Dresdner SC 1898
2016-2020	(France) RC Cannes
2023-2025	(Brazil) Minas Tênis Clube
2025-2026	(Brazil) Osasco
2026-	(Italy) Megavolley

National team
United States
Medal record
Representing the United States
Pan-American Cup
Bronze medal – third place	2023 Ponce
Pan American Cup Final Six
Gold medal – first place	2023 Santo Domingo

Jenna Camille Gray (born February 28, 1998) is an American professional volleyball player who completed her collegiate career at Stanford University. She currently plays for Osasco Voleibol Clube.

== Early years ==
Gray was born to Brian and Debbie Gray and grew up in Shawnee, Kansas. She grew up as part of a very athletic family. Her father played collegiate baseball at the University of Kansas, while her mother ran track at Kansas State. Her older sister, Rachel, played volleyball at the University of Virginia. A cousin, Riley Pint, was a baseball pitcher who became a first-round draft choice by the Colorado Rockies in 2016.

Gray played volleyball throughout all four years while attending St. James Academy High School, as well as earning two varsity letters in track and field competing in javelin. She won two state titles in javelin and holds the Kansas state record in Class 5A for a javelin throw at 162 feet. She helped her team win the Kansas State title in volleyball three times. Gray was named Gatorade Player of the Year for the state of Kansas, and The Stars All-Metro player of the year. Gray tallied 3,771 assists in her four years of high school volleyball.

One of Gray's teammates at St. James Academy was Audriana Fitzmorris. When they both were 12 years old, the NCAA Volleyball National Championship was played in Kansas City, and they both attended. Gray remembers the conclusion of the match: “When the confetti fell after match point, I would get chills every time," Gray says. "I would say, 'That could be me one day.'" Both Fitzmorris and Gray were looking into college to further their volleyball careers, but they were largely looking at different schools with different coaches. Stanford expressed interest in Gray, but she initially thought they were really interested in Fitzmorris and were simply being polite to her. However, Stanford was interested in both players, and made offers to each of them. Both accepted, so they continued on as teammates through college.

== College ==
Gray started off her college career with a bang. She helped the team to a 21–7 regular season record and an at-large invitation to the 2016 NCAA Division I women's volleyball tournament. Stanford was seeded 6th overall and faced their first major test In the regional final, when they upset third-seeded Wisconsin 3–2, after being down 2–0 early in the match, to earn a spot in the Final Four. In the semifinals, Stanford faced second-seeded Minnesota but again came through with the upset winning 3–1. In the championship game, Stanford faced fourth-seeded Texas and completed their third straight upset, winning 3–1. Gray was named to the all-tournament team.

In the spring of her freshman year, Gray also competed on the track and field team and earned second team All-America honors. She also played on the Stanford beach volleyball team her freshman year, partnering with indoor teammate Kathryn Plummer, before deciding that competing in three collegiate sports was too much.

In her sophomore year, she again helped lead her team to the NCAA Division I women's volleyball tournament, improving their regular season record to 26–3 and earning the number three overall seed in the tournament. Stanford breezed through the regional losing only one set in the first four matches. This meant that Gray and her teammate Fitzmorris would compete in the same Arena, the Sprint Center, where they had watched the 2010 National Championship match. However, Stanford faced the second overall seed Florida in the semifinals and failed to advance, with Florida winning 3–2.

Gray also competed in the javelin, with an NCAA throw of 187–11, good enough to place her as No. 2 on Stanford's all-time list.

As a junior, Gray helped her team to a 28–1 regular season record and the overall top seed in the NCAA Division 1 women's volleyball tournament. Stanford advanced to the Final Four, where they beat BYU in the National semifinals 3–0, then prevailed in a hard-fought match against Nebraska, winning 3–2, to win the National Championship for the 8th time in the school's history. Gray was again named to the all-tournament team.

In the spring track and field season, she earned first team All-America honors for javelin.

In her senior year, the Stanford team had a 24–4 regular season record and earned the number three overall seed in the NCAA Division 1 women's volleyball tournament. Stanford won their first two matches without dropping a set but then struggled against unseeded Utah in the regional semifinals, finally prevailing 3–2. They would not lose another set in the tournament, beating Penn State with a 3–0 sweep to advance to the Final Four, then sweeping Minnesota 3-0 to reach the championship game. In the final round, Stanford swept Wisconsin 3-0 to win their 9th National Championship and their third championship in 4 years. Once again, Gray was named to the all-tournament team.

Gray won the Honda Sports Award as the nation's best collegiate female volleyball player in 2019.

Gray was only the fourth player in program history to surpass 5,000 career assists, finishing her college career with a total of 5,485 assists. This number put her second in all-time career assists in the program. She was also third in school history in career aces with 136.

== Professional career ==
Jenna Gray moved to the Dresdner SC 1898 for the 2020/21 season, where she played professional volleyball in the German Women's Volleyball League.

== Awards and honors ==
=== High school ===
- Gatorade Player of the Year (Kansas)
- Female Scholar-Athlete of the Year (The Kansas City Star)

=== College ===
- Pac-12 Setter of the Year 2017, 2018, 2019
- AVCA First team All-America 2017, 2018, 2019
- NCAA All-Tournament team 2016, 2018, 2019
- VolleyballMag.com All-America first team 2019
- Senior CLASS Award second team (volleyball) 2020
- Honda Sports Award (volleyball) 2020
