= Studenti Volley =

Albanian men's volleyball team

- Founded: 1953; 73 years ago
- Ground: Asllan Rusi Sports Palace (Capacity: 2,800)
- Manager: Arben Sako
- League: Albanian Volleyball League
- 2015–16: Regular season: 1st Playoffs: Champions

Studenti Volley
Medal record

Men's volleyball

Albanian League
Gold medal – first place	1994–95	
Gold medal – first place	1999–00	
Gold medal – first place	2001–02	
Gold medal – first place	2002–03	
Gold medal – first place	2003–04	
Gold medal – first place	2004–05	
Gold medal – first place	2006–07	
Gold medal – first place	2007–08	
Gold medal – first place	2008–09	
Gold medal – first place	2009–10	
Gold medal – first place	2011–12	
Gold medal – first place	2012–13	
Gold medal – first place	2013–14	
Gold medal – first place	2014–15	
Gold medal – first place	2015–16	

Albanian Cup
Gold medal – first place	1994–95	
Gold medal – first place	1996–97	
Gold medal – first place	2000–01	
Gold medal – first place	2001–02	
Gold medal – first place	2003–04	
Gold medal – first place	2004–05	
Gold medal – first place	2005–06	
Gold medal – first place	2006–07	
Gold medal – first place	2007–08	
Gold medal – first place	2009–10	
Gold medal – first place	2010–11	
Gold medal – first place	2011–12	
Gold medal – first place	2012–13	
Gold medal – first place	2013–14	
Gold medal – first place	2014–15	
Gold medal – first place	2015–16	

FSHV Cup
Gold medal – first place	2015	

Studenti Volley a men's volleyball team based in Tirana, Albania. The club is considered to be one of the best in the country, having won 14 league titles out of a possible 17 since 2000. The men's volleyball department is the most successful department within the Student Sports Club.
