= Tomorr Sinani Sports Palace =

Sports arena in Elbasan, Albania

- Pallati I Sportit Tomorr Sinani
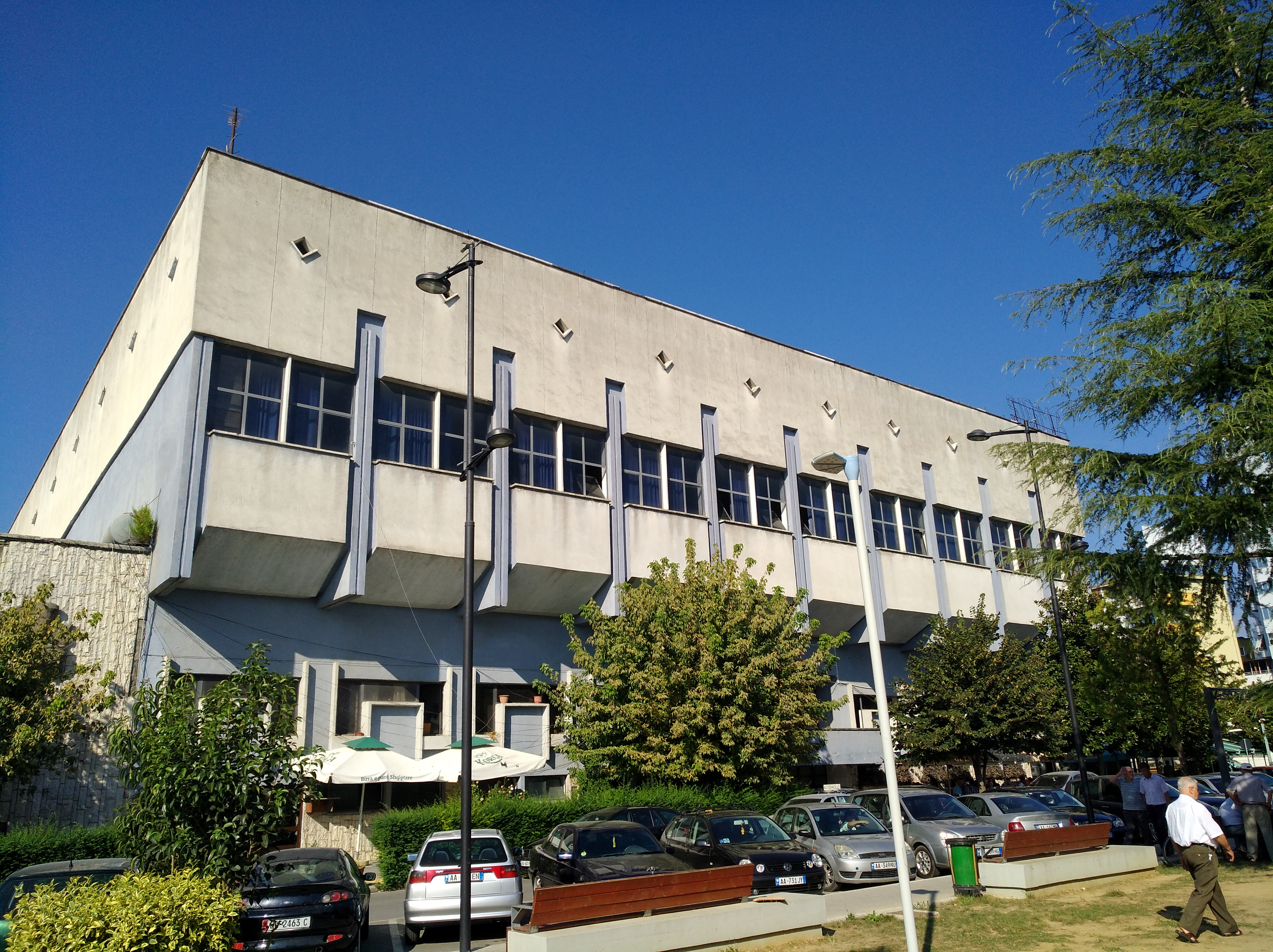
- Interactive map of Tomorr Sinani Sports Palace
- Location: Elbasan, Albania
- Owner: Municipality of Elbasan
- Operator: Municipality of Elbasan
- Capacity: 2,200

Construction
- Opened: 1982

Tenants
- BC Elbasani, KV Elbasani

Tomorr Sinani Sports Palace is a multi-use sports arena in Elbasan, Albania. It is owned and operated by the Municipality of Elbasan and it is the home of the multidisciplinary KS Elbasani.
