= Albanian Basketball Cup (women) =

The Albanian Basketball Cup (Women) is a competition featuring female professional basketball clubs from Albania and the second important event after Albanian Basketball League. It was founded in 1956 from the Albanian Basketball Association. The team with the most trophies is Tirana with 27 cups won.

== Winners ==
Season	Cup Winner
1956	Puna e Tiranës
1957	Tirana A
1960	17 Nëntori
1961	17 Nëntori
1962	17 Nëntori
1963	Vllaznia Shkodër
1965	17 Nëntori
1966	17 Nëntori
1967	17 Nëntori
1968	17 Nëntori
1969	17 Nëntori (*)
1970	17 Nëntori
1971	17 Nëntori
1972	17 Nëntori
1973	B.C. Apolonia
1974	Labinoti
1975	B.C. Apolonia
1976	BC Lokomotiva Durrës
1977	17 Nëntori
1978	17 Nëntori
1979	PBC Flamurtari
1980	17 Nëntori
1981	Skënderbeu Korçë
1982	Skënderbeu Korçë
1983	Skënderbeu Korçë
1984	PBC Flamurtari
1985	17 Nëntori
1986	PBC Flamurtari
1987	17 Nëntori
1988	PBC Flamurtari
1989	Vllaznia Shkodër
1990	17 Nëntori
1991	PBC Flamurtari
1992	Skënderbeu Korçë
1993	Elbasani
1994	Tirana (**)
1995	PBC Flamurtari
1996	Tirana
1997	PBC Flamurtari
1998	Tirana
1999	Skënderbeu Korçë
2000	Skënderbeu Korçë
2001	PBC Flamurtari
2002	Luftëtari
2003	Luftëtari
2004	PBC Flamurtari
2005	PBC Flamurtari (*)
2006	Tirana
2007	PBC Flamurtari
2008	PBC Flamurtari
2009	PBC Flamurtari
2010	PBC Flamurtari
2011	PBC Flamurtari
2012	B.C. Apolonia
2013	Tirana
2014	PBC Flamurtari
2015	B.C. Apolonia
2016	PBC Flamurtari
2017	PBC Flamurtari
2018	Tirana
2019	Tirana
2020	PBC Flamurtari
2021	WBC Partizani
2022	Tirana Barleti Basket
2023	PBC Flamurtari (**)
2024	PBC Flamurtari
2025	Tirana

== Performance by club ==
PBC Tirana 27 times

PBC Flamurtari 21 times

Skënderbeu Korçë 6 times

B.C Apolonia 4 times

Luftëtari 2 times

Vllaznia Shkodër 2 times

KS Elbasani 2 times

BC Teuta Durrës (Women) 1 time

Tirana Barleti Basket 1 time

WBC Partizani 1 time
