= Chiara Borgogno =

Italian volleyball player (born 1984)

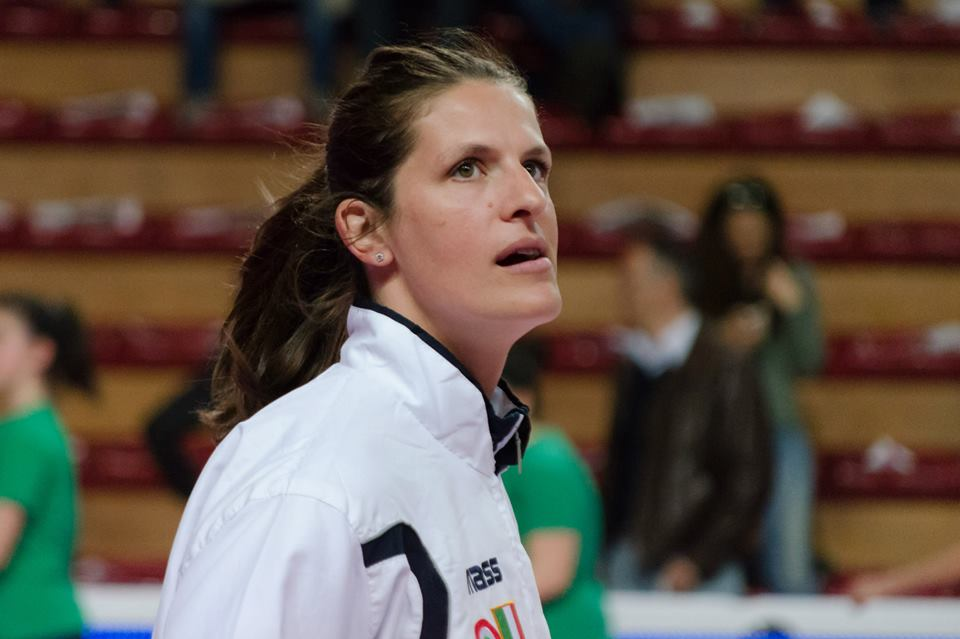

Personal information
- Nationality: Italian
- Born: 8 February 1984 (age 42)
- Height: 192 cm (76 in)

Volleyball information
- Position: Middle blocker
- Number: 11

Career
Years	Teams
2015	LPM Mondovì

Chiara Borgogno (born 8 February 1984) is an Italian female volleyball player, playing as a Middle blocker. On club level she plays for LPM Mondovì.
