= Albanian A-1 League (women) =

- Founded: 1946
- Country: Albania
- Confederation: FIBA Europe (Europe)
- Divisions: Albanian A-1 League (Women)
- Number of clubs: 8
- Level on pyramid: 1
- Current champions: PBC Flamurtari (26th title) (2024-25)
- Most championships: KB Tirana (42 titles)
- Broadcaster(s): TVSH and Supersport (highlights)
- Current: 2024–25 Albanian A-1 League (Women)

The Albanian Basketball League for women is a league competition featuring professional basketball clubs from Albania. It was founded in 1946 from the Albanian Basketball Association, several days after the latter was formed. It is the top level basketball league in Albanian from its foundation. The team with the most championships is KB Tirana with 42 championships.

The Albanian Basketball League consists of 12 professional basketball clubs in Albania and it is one of the oldest basketball competitions in the Balkans having started in 1946. The sport rapidly grew in Albania and by the 1970s almost every city and town had its own basketball club and basketball field. After communism fell many of the basketball clubs folded as many players left the country to play for foreign teams. The basketball attendance decreased and the popularity of this sport declined worryingly. However, after 1993 basketball rose up again with many cities re-establishing their teams. Now in Albania there are twelve professional teams while there are plenty of amateur teams ready to enter the league.

== History ==
The Albanian Basketball League is one of the oldest continuing basketball competitions in the region of the Balkans, having started in 1946. The league was formed less than two years after the Communist Party of Albania gained control of the country, and the sport gradually grew in popularity over the years before experiencing a rapid rise in popularity in the 1970s, leading to most cities and towns in Albania forming their own basketball clubs and building basketball grounds. Following the fall of communism in 1991 many basketball clubs were forced to fold due to lack of any investment, which led to the decline in the popularity of the sport as a whole in the country. However, since 1993 there has been some re-establishment of the folded teams as private investment along with some state funded has allowed teams to continue functioning.

== Competition ==
The members of the Albanian Basketball League are grouped in two divisions: A1 League and B2 League. Each division has six teams and they have to play four times against each other in two different phases during the regular season. In every phase a club plays each of the others twice, once at their home stadium and once at that of their opponents. This makes a total of 20 games played per season in the regular season.

After the regular season ends the top four clubs qualify for the play-offs, where the team placed first faces the one placed fourth while the second and the third placed teams play each other. From these encounters qualifies the team that gets first two victories while games are played once home, once away until the two victories are reached. The teams that win their encounters qualify for the finals which are played in the clubs respective grounds, the game will once be played home and once away, depending on the draw. The team that gets first the three victories is crowned as champion.

Clubs that win get two points that the ones that lose get one point. At the end of the regular season the bottom two clubs miss the play-offs. The bottom club gets relegated while the fifth placed club will play the second placed of the B2 League. The team that wins the play-out has the right to play in A1 League.

== Winners ==
Season	Champion	Runner up	Result
1947	17 Nëntori		
1948	17 Nëntori		
1949	17 Nëntori		
1950	17 Nëntori		
1951	17 Nëntori		
1952	17 Nëntori		
1953	17 Nëntori		
1954	17 Nëntori		
1955	17 Nëntori		
1956	17 Nëntori (*)		
1957	17 Nëntori		
1958	17 Nëntori		
1959	17 Nëntori		
1960	17 Nëntori		
1961	17 Nëntori		
1962	17 Nëntori		
1963	17 Nëntori		
1964	17 Nëntori		
1966	17 Nëntori		
1968	17 Nëntori (**)		
1969	17 Nëntori		
1970	17 Nëntori		
1971	17 Nëntori		
1972	17 Nëntori		
1973	17 Nëntori		
1974	17 Nëntori		
1975	B.C. Apolonia		
1976	17 Nëntori		
1977	PBC Flamurtari		
1978	BC Skënderbeu Korçë		
1979	PBC Flamurtari		
1980	PBC Flamurtari		
1981	PBC Flamurtari		
1982	17 Nëntori		
1983	17 Nëntori		
1984	PBC Flamurtari		
1985	PBC Flamurtari		
1986	17 Nëntori (***)		
1987	17 Nëntori		
1988	17 Nëntori		
1989	Partizani Tirana		
1990	PBC Flamurtari		
1991	17 Nëntori		
1992	KB Tirana		
1993	KB Tirana		
1994	KB Tirana		
1995	KB Tirana		
1996	PBC Flamurtari		
1997	KB Tirana		
1998	KB Tirana		
1999	KB Tirana (****)		
2000	BC Skënderbeu Korçë		
2001	PBC Flamurtari		
2002	BC Luftëtari		
2003	BC Luftëtari		
2004	BC Luftëtari		
2005	PBC Flamurtari (*)		
2006	PBC Flamurtari		
2007	PBC Flamurtari		
2008	PBC Flamurtari		
2009	PBC Flamurtari		
2010	PBC Flamurtari		
2011	PBC Flamurtari	KB Tirana	2-1
2012	B.C. Apolonia	PBC Flamurtari	3-2
2013	PBC Flamurtari	B.C. Apolonia	3-0
2014	PBC Flamurtari	B.C. Apolonia	3-0
2015	PBC Flamurtari	B.C. Apolonia	3-2
2016	PBC Flamurtari (**)		
2017	PBC Flamurtari	KB Tirana	3-1
2018	PBC Flamurtari	KB Tirana	3-0
2019	KB Tirana	Tirana II	3-0
2020	-	-	-
2021	PBC Flamurtari	BC Partizani	3-0
2022	PBC Flamurtari	BC Partizani	3-0
2023	PBC Flamurtari	BC Partizani	3-1
2024	KB Tirana	PBC Flamurtari	3-1
2025	PBC Flamurtari	KB Tirana	3-0

== Championship winning teams ==
Team	Winners
KB Tirana	42
PBC Flamurtari	26
BC Luftëtari	3
B.C Apolonia	2
BC Skënderbeu Korçë	2
BC Partizani Tirana	1

== Also look ==
- Albanian Basketball Cup (Women)
- Albanian Basketball Supercup (Women)
