= Farka Volley =

Albanian men's volleyball team

- Founded: June 16, 2009; 16 years ago
- Ground: Farie Hoti Sports Palace (Capacity: 1,000)
- President: Shkëlqim Fusha
- Manager: Dritan Bardhi
- League: Albanian Volleyball League
- 2015–16: Regular season: 4th Playoffs:

Farka Volley
Medal record

Men's volleyball

Albanian Cup
Silver medal – second place	2015	

FSHV Cup
Gold medal – first place	2016	

Farka Volley (Albanian: Farka Volej) a men's volleyball team based in Farkë, Tirana County. The club was founded on 16 June 2009 and they compete in the Albanian Volleyball League, which is the highest level of volleyball in the country.
