= KV Tirana =

Albanian men's volleyball team

- Ground: Asllan Rusi Sports Palace (Capacity: 2,800)
- League: Albanian Volleyball League
- 2022–23: Regular season: 1st Playoffs: Champions

Uniforms
Home	Away

KV Tirana (Klubi i Volejbollit Tirana) are the men's and women's volleyball branches of multiple sports club SK Tirana, a major sports club in Tirana, Albania. KV Tirana volleyball men's and women's team are amongst the successful and historical squads in Albania.

== History (Volleyball Men's) ==
On August 16, 1920, the patriot P. Nika altogether with gentlemen A. Erebara, P. Jakova, A. Hoxha, A. Koja, P. Berisha, A. Zajmi, H. Fortuzi, B. Pazari, L. Berisha, S. Frasheri, H. Alizoti, A. Gjitomi and V. Fekeci founded "Agimi Sports Association". In 1927 on the initiative of Mr S. Stermasi, Mr A. Erebara, Mr A. Zajmi and Mr A. Koja, "Agimi" changed its name to Sportklub Tirana (SK Tirana).

KV Tirana (men's) are 11 times Champions of Albania, and also 9 times winners of Albanian Cup, standing at top-4 clubs, along with Dinamo Tirana, Studenti and Partizani Tirana. KV Tirana have also won two international trophies; Independence Cup in 2021 and Gjergj Kastrioti League a year later. White and blues have participated in European competitions, and in many friendly international tournaments, where occasionally have reached successes, like eliminating Lausanne of Switzerland in the 1st round of 1990–91 Cup Winners Cup winning in points difference, before being knocked out from Milberstofer München in the 2nd round losing 1-3 & 0-3. Tirana repeated successes also in 1995–96 and 1996–97 seasons when eliminated Buducnost Podgorica and OL Kakanj Bosnia. Since 1996 KV Tirana (Men's) team have only won a few trophies, however are staying into competition every season.

Home Court: Asllan Rusi (3.000)

=== Achievements (Volleyball Men's) ===
==== Domestic ====
Albanian Volleyball League Champions - 11 (1947, 1948, 1949, 1957, 1987, 1988, 1992, 1993, 1994, 2022, 2023)

Albanian Volleyball Cup Winners - 9 (1957, 1958, 1964, 1987, 1991, 1992, 1996, 2022, 2023)

==== International ====
Independence Cup Volleyball Men - 1 (2021)

Gjergj Kastrioti League Volleyball Men - 1 (2022)

== History (Volleyball Women's) ==
On August 16, 1920, the patriot P. Nika altogether with gentlemen A. Erebara, P. Jakova, A. Hoxha, A. Koja, P. Berisha, A. Zajmi, H. Fortuzi, B. Pazari, L. Berisha, S. Frasheri, H. Alizoti, A. Gjitomi and V. Fekeci founded "Agimi Sports Association". In 1927 on the initiative of Mr S. Stermasi, Mr A. Erebara, Mr A. Zajmi and Mr A. Koja, "Agimi" changed its name to Sportklub Tirana (SK Tirana).

KV Tirana (Women's) are 21 times Champions of Albania which is most in the country, 12 times winners of Albanian Cup and once winners of Supercup, thus being one of two clubs with most trophies in Albania. KV Tirana are also winners of the Nationwide Volleyball Supercup in 2011. Tirana have also taken part in European competitions, and in many friendly international tournaments, where occasionally have reached successes, like their best achievement in the 1994–95 season when eliminated Makedonija Strumnica (3-0, 1-3) and OK Celje Slovenia (Slovenians withdrew) before being knocked out in 1/8 finals from Italians of Latte Rugiada Matera (0-3, 0-3). Tirana repeated success also in 1969–70 Champions Clubs Cup, by eliminating Fenerbahce Istanbul, before being knocked out from Rapid Bucharest in the 2nd round losing 0-3, 0-3. Their latest European wins were those of season 1995–96 in the CEV Cup beating Klimacommerce Bled of Slovenia 3-0 and the one of IV International Women Tournament of Partinico (Italy) in 1992, where achieved silver medal by beating KIW Agrigento 3-1.

In the recent seasons KV Tirana (Women's) has won 5 championships, 5 cups and 1 Supercup.

Home Court: Asllan Rusi (3.000) Website: www.sktirana-volley.com

=== Domestic achievements (Volleyball Women's) ===
Albanian Volleyball League Champions - 21 (1946, 1948, 1950, 1951, 1952, 1955, 1959, 1961, 1962, 1963, 1964, 1966, 1967, 1969, 1992, 1994, 2008, 2009, 2010, 2013, 2025) (Record)

Albanian Volleyball Cup Winners - 12 (1957, 1960, 1961, 1965, 1966, 1967, 1968, 2008, 2012, 2013, 2022, 2025)

Albanian Volleyball Supercup Winners - 1 (2014)

Nationwide Supercup Winners - 1 (2011)
