= KB Flamurtari =

- Nickname: Kuqezinjtë
- Leagues: Albanian Basketball Superleague; Albanian Basketball Cup
- Founded: 1924
- History: 1924–present
- Arena: Flamurtari Sports Palace (2,040 seats)
- Location: Vlorë, Albania
- Team colors: Red, Black
- President: Bashkia Vlorë
- Head coach: Ilir Meli
Home	Away

KB Flamurtari is an Albanian basketball team that plays in the Albanian Basketball League. The club was founded in 1924 as part of the multi disciplinary KS Flamurtari. Flamurtari's women team is one of the most successful teams in Albania winning the Albanian League 25 times.

== History ==
KB Flamurtari Vlorë was founded in 1924. In 2023, they won the Albanian First Division.

== Domestic achievements ==
- Albanian First Division (3): 2005, 2014, 2023

== Notable players ==
- (Albania) Viron Toska

== Women's team ==
=== Roster ===
Note: Flags indicate national team eligibility at FIBA-sanctioned events. Players may hold other non-FIBA nationalities not displayed.

Flamurtari roster
Players
Coaches

Pos.	No.	Nat.	Name	Ht.	Wt.	Age
C	15	(Bosnia and Herzegovina)	Omerbasic, Samra
SG	7	(Montenegro)	Vujacic, Milica
PG	10	(United States)	Raby, Caleigh
C	12	(Republic of the Congo)	ikete, Liliane
PG	4	(Albania)	Myrto, Artemida
G	8	(Albania)	Memushi, Tea
SG	6	(Albania)	Demaj, Izabel
SG	21	(Albania)	Brahimaj, Serena
SG	40	(Albania)	Rrapaj, Olta
C	41	(Albania)	Aliaj, Adelajda
SG	25	(Albania)	Zinxhiria, Sara
PF	27	(Albania)	Dervishi, Viktoria
C	12	(Albania)	Hudhra, Kledia
PF	26	(Albania)	Isufi, Keisi
SG	14	(Albania)	Hamiti, Ersila

Head coach

- (Albania) Elona Merkaj

Legend

- (C) Team captain
- Injured
