= KS Studenti =

Albanian football club

- Full name: Klubi Sportiv Studenti
- Founded: 1953; 72 years ago
- Based in: Tirana, Albania
- Colors: Red and white
- President: Blendi Nallbani

Klubi Sportiv Studenti is an Albanian sports club based in the country's capital, Tirana, which represents the University of Tirana. The club consists of various departments including basketball, volleyball shooting and judo. The club is funded by the Ministry of Education and Sport

== Departments ==
Sport	Teams
Football	KS Studenti (men's football – defunct)
Basketball	KS Studenti (men's basketball)
Basketball	KS Studenti (women's basketball)
Volleyball	Studenti Volley (men's volleyball)
Volleyball	KS Studenti (women's volleyball)
Shooting	KS Studenti
Karate	KS Studenti (since 2015)
Judo	KS Studenti (since 2016)
