= Albanian Volleyball Federation =

Sports governing body in Albania

- Federata Shqiptare e Volejbollit
- Sport: Volleyball
- Jurisdiction: Albania
- Abbreviation: FSHV
- Founded: 2 September 1945; 79 years ago
- Affiliation: FIVB
- Affiliation date: 1949
- Regional affiliation: CEV
- Affiliation date: 1949
- Headquarters: Tirana
- President: Erlind Pëllumbi
- Secretary: Ervis Dosti
- Men's coach: Jani Melka
- Women's coach: Roland Tarja

Official website
- www.fshv.org.al

The Albanian Volleyball Federation (FSHV) (Albanian: Federata Shqiptare e Volejbollit) is the main governing authority for professional volleyball in Albania. It oversees the organization of the First Division, Second Division and the National Cup competition.

In September 1949, FSHV became a full-fledged member of both the International Volleyball Federation (FIVB) and the European Volleyball Confederation (CEV). Since October 2000, it is a member of the Balkan Volleyball Association (BVA).

== History ==
The Albanian Volleyball Federation was established on September 2, 1945. The men’s national team achieved notable early success in European competition, placing 10th at the 1955 European Championship held in Romania; finishing in 11th place at the 1958 Championship in Czechoslovakia; and rounding up in 13th place at the 1967 Championship in Turkey.

In 1988, the women’s team won the Balkan Championship and in 1990, it secured a gold medal at the Mediterranean Games in Latakia, Syria.

From 2016 onward, both national teams have participated in a range of international tournaments. In 2018, the women’s team won bronze in the CEV European League.

Other recent success include a Silver medal at the 2017 Balkan Youth Championship, Bronze at the 2019 Balkan Youth Championship and Silver at the Beach Volleyball tournament for boys in 2019.

== See also ==
- Sport in Albania
