= Albania men's national basketball team results (2020–present) =

This is a list of the Albania men's national basketball team results from 2020 to present.

== Results and fixtures ==
Win Loss

=== 2020 ===
20 February 2020 2023 FIBA World Cup pre-qualifiers – 1st round	Portugal	70–62	Albania	Albufeira, Portugal
18:30 (UTC±0)	Scoring by quarter: 9–18, 22–13, 13–16, 26–15
	Pts: Fonseca 16; Rebs: Fonseca, Queiroz 6 Asts: Lisboa, Ventura 4	Boxscore	Pts: Taflaj 18; Rebs: Lekndreaj 9 Asts: Shestani 7	Arena: Pavilhão Desportivo de Albufeira; Attendance: 1,400; Referees: Can Mavisu (TUR), Raúl Zamorano (ESP), James Dominique (GIB)

23 February 2020 2023 FIBA World Cup pre-qualifiers – 1st round	Albania	71–64	Cyprus	Durrës, Albania
17:00 (UTC+1)	Scoring by quarter: 14–17, 13–16, 22–15, 22–16
	Pts: Moore 20; Rebs: Hysenagolli 11; Asts: four players 2	Boxscore	Pts: Michail 17; Rebs: Koumis, Stylianou 6 Asts: Razis 6	Arena: Dhimitraq Goga Sports Palace; Attendance: 100; Referees: Aleksandar Milojević (MKD), Ivan Miličević (BIH), Jasmina Juras (SRB)

26 November 2020 2023 FIBA World Cup pre-qualifiers – 1st round	Belarus	90–50	Albania	Matosinhos, Portugal* (Note: Due to the COVID-19 pandemic, all matches in the November 2020 and February 2021 windows were played behind closed doors in select host cities.)
16:30 (UTC±0)	Scoring by quarter: 21–16, 24–7, 23–20, 22–7
	Pts: Parakhouski 17; Rebs: Parakhouski 10; Asts: Mikulski, Trastsinetski 5	Boxscore	Pts: Lekndreaj 15; Rebs: Shima 7 Asts: Strazimiri 3	Arena: Centro de Desportos e Congressos; Referees: Charalampos Karakatsounis (GRE), Guido Giovannetti (ITA), Maxime Boubert (FRA)

28 November 2020 2023 FIBA World Cup pre-qualifiers – 1st round	Albania	70–88	Portugal	Matosinhos, Portugal*
18:00 (UTC±0)	Scoring by quarter: 16–22, 21–26, 25–21, 8–19
	Pts: Shima 18; Rebs: Lekndreaj 7 Asts: Lekndreaj 7	Boxscore	Pts: Bastos 16; Rebs: Queiroz 8 Asts: Lisboa, Ventura 7	Arena: Centro de Desportos e Congressos; Referees: Charalampos Karakatsounis (GRE), Guido Giovannetti (ITA), Alberto Sánchez (ESP)

=== 2021 ===
18 February 2021 2023 FIBA World Cup pre-qualifiers – 1st round	Cyprus	88–66	Albania	Nicosia, Cyprus*
19:00 (UTC+2)	Scoring by quarter: 18–22, 14–12, 26–15, 30–17
	Pts: Iliadis 21; Rebs: Koumis 7 Asts: Eleftheriou 6	Boxscore	Pts: Pullazi 17; Rebs: Hysenagolli 9 Asts: Shestani 5	Arena: Eleftheria Indoor Hall; Referees: Ilya Putenko (RUS), Péter Praksch (HUN), Franko Gracin (CRO)

20 February 2021 2023 FIBA World Cup pre-qualifiers – 1st round	Albania	72–93	Belarus	Nicosia, Cyprus*
19:00 (UTC+2)	Scoring by quarter: 24–25, 15–19, 16–26, 17–23
	Pts: Taflaj 16; Rebs: Hysenagolli 10; Asts: Bedini, Hysenagolli 4	Boxscore	Pts: Beliankou 26; Rebs: Salash, Vikentsyeu 6 Asts: Blizniuk 7	Arena: Eleftheria Indoor Hall; Referees: Nemanja Ninković (SRB), Péter Praksch (HUN), Franko Gracin (CRO)

25 November 2021 EuroBasket 2025 pre-qualifiers – 1st round	Albania	92–89	Luxembourg	Durrës, Albania
18:00 (UTC+1)	Scoring by quarter: 27–26, 21–20, 20–28, 24–15
	Pts: Pullazi 23; Rebs: Lekndreaj 9 Asts: Shestani 4	Boxscore	Pts: Rugg 25; Rebs: Rugg 7 Asts: Grün 8	Arena: Dhimitraq Goga Sports Palace; Attendance: 300; Referees: Goran Sljivić (AUT), Can Mavisu (TUR), Anastasios Kardaris (GRE)

=== 2022 ===
24 February 2022 EuroBasket 2025 pre-qualifiers – 1st round	Romania	101–84	Albania	Ploiești, Romania
18:00 (UTC+2)	Scoring by quarter: 28–29, 24–27, 25–14, 24–14
	Pts: Richard, Torok 16; Rebs: Cățe 10; Asts: Richard, Tohătan 7	Boxscore	Pts: Dusha 20; Rebs: Hysenagolli 8 Asts: Lekndreaj, Moore 3	Arena: Olimpia Sports Hall; Attendance: 750; Referees: Ilya Putenko (RUS), Ali Şakacı (TUR), Milosav Kaluđerović (MNE)

27 February 2022 EuroBasket 2025 pre-qualifiers – 1st round	Luxembourg	86–75	Albania	Luxembourg City, Luxembourg
17:00 (UTC+1)	Scoring by quarter: 21–26, 27–15, 21–14, 17–20
	Pts: Rugg 33; Rebs: Rugg 13; Asts: Melcher 9	Boxscore	Pts: Moore 18; Rebs: Hysenagolli 8 Asts: three players 3	Arena: d'Coque; Attendance: 1,617; Referees: Francisco Araña (ESP), Nikola Bejat (NOR), Bert van Slooten (NED)

3 July 2022 EuroBasket 2025 pre-qualifiers – 1st round	Albania	62–76	Romania	Durrës, Albania
20:30 (UTC+2)	Scoring by quarter: 18–21, 20–20, 8–15, 16–20
	Pts: Taflaj 12; Rebs: Hamati, Pullazi 7 Asts: Hysa 4	Boxscore	Pts: Olah 22; Rebs: Torok 9 Asts: Tohătan 11	Arena: Dhimitraq Goga Sports Palace; Attendance: 300; Referees: Petros Papapetrou (GRE), Mladen Lučić (MNE), Hrvoje Čavar (BIH)

=== 2023 ===
19 July 2023 EuroBasket 2025 pre-qualifiers – 3rd round	Albania	83–87	Romania	Durrës, Albania
20:30 (UTC+2)	Scoring by quarter: 22–21, 20–23, 22–25, 19–18
	Pts: Lekndreaj 20; Rebs: Lekndreaj 11; Asts: Dusha 4	Boxscore	Pts: Richard 18; Rebs: Diculescu 9 Asts: Richard 8	Arena: Dhimitraq Goga Sports Palace; Referees: Kerem Baki (TUR), Sergii Zashchuk (UKR), Martin Vulić (CRO)

26 July 2023 EuroBasket 2025 pre-qualifiers – 3rd round	Slovakia	86–63	Albania	Levice, Slovakia
18:00 (UTC+2)	Scoring by quarter: 30–27, 16–10, 19–3, 21–23
	Pts: Brodziansky 19; Rebs: Mokráň 9 Asts: Majerčák 3	Boxscore	Pts: Dusha 19; Rebs: Tola 7 Asts: Lekndreaj, F. Lilaj 2	Arena: Športová hala Levice; Attendance: 1,300; Referees: Zafer Yılmaz (TUR), Can Mavisu (TUR), Gvidas Gedvilas (LTU)

29 July 2023 EuroBasket 2025 pre-qualifiers – 3rd round	Romania	72–63	Albania	Pitești, Romania
18:30 (UTC+3)	Scoring by quarter: 10–23, 26–16, 20–16, 16–8
	Pts: Popa 17; Rebs: Diculescu 9 Asts: three players 5	Boxscore	Pts: Lekndreaj 16; Rebs: Lekndreaj 11; Asts: Dusha 7	Arena: Pitești Arena; Attendance: 1,000; Referees: Haris Bijedić (BIH), Petar Pešić (SRB), Nermin Hodžić (BIH)

5 August 2023 EuroBasket 2025 pre-qualifiers – 3rd round	Albania	64–89	Slovakia	Durrës, Albania
20:30 (UTC+2)	Scoring by quarter: 21–15, 13–26, 15–28, 15–20
	Pts: F. Lilaj 14; Rebs: Hamati 7 Asts: Hysa 7	Boxscore	Pts: Hlivák 20; Rebs: Mokráň, Pavelka 5 Asts: Hlivák, Majerčák 6	Arena: Dhimitraq Goga Sports Palace; Attendance: 150; Referees: Martin Horozov (BUL), Özlem Yalman (TUR), Nemanja Ninković (SRB)

=== 2024 ===
25 February 2024 2027 FIBA World Cup pre-qualifiers – 1st round	Armenia	84–79	Albania	Yerevan, Armenia
18:00 (UTC+4)	Scoring by quarter: 24–23, 24–19, 14–17, 22–20
	Pts: Spight 31; Rebs: Tavitian 8 Asts: Jones 11	Boxscore	Pts: Lekndreaj 19; Rebs: Lilaj 10; Asts: Lekndreaj 5	Arena: Karen Demirchyan Complex; Attendance: 3,000; Referees: Ciprian Stoica (ROU), Zoran Mitrovski (MKD), Emmouil Tsolakos (GRE)

21 November 2024 2027 FIBA World Cup pre-qualifiers – 1st round	Albania	63–99	Austria	Durrës, Albania
19:30 (UTC+1)	Scoring by quarter: 18–27, 17–23, 12–32, 16–17
	Pts: Hamati 16; Rebs: Hamati 6 Asts: Dusha 4	Boxscore	Pts: Landesberg 23; Rebs: Brajkovic 7 Asts: Vujošević 4	Arena: Dhimitraq Goga Sports Palace; Attendance: 250; Referees: Arnau Padros (ESP), Valerio Grigioni (ITA), Ioannis Agrafiotis (GRE)

=== 2025 ===
20 February 2025 2027 FIBA World Cup pre-qualifiers – 1st round	Albania	70–91	Armenia	Durrës, Albania
19:00 (UTC+1)	Scoring by quarter: 17–22, 16–25, 22–22, 15–22
	Pts: Lekndreaj 17; Rebs: Tola 8 Asts: Hysa 6	Boxscore	Pts: Jones 34; Rebs: Tatevosyan 7 Asts: Jones 10	Arena: Dhimitraq Goga Sports Palace; Attendance: 250; Referees: Ioannis Tsimpouris (GRE), Hrvoje Čavar (BIH), Domen Krajnc (SVN)

23 February 2025 2027 FIBA World Cup pre-qualifiers – 1st round	Austria	67–78	Albania	Schwechat, Austria
16:00 (UTC+1)	Scoring by quarter: 16–19, 15–16, 17–22, 19–21
	Pts: Suljanovic 11; Rebs: Brajkovic 9 Asts: Hahn 6	Boxscore	Pts: Hysa 17; Rebs: Tola 9 Asts: Hysa, Topalli 5	Arena: Multiversum; Attendance: 1,500; Referees: Branimir Galić (CRO), Viktor Nagy (HUN), Elvis Binders-Čoders (LAT)

27 November 2025 EuroBasket 2029 pre-qualifiers – 1st round	Slovakia	73–63	Albania	Prievidza, Slovakia
18:00 (UTC+1)	Scoring by quarter: 19–23, 22–12, 16–17, 16–11
	Pts: Kováčik 13; Rebs: Golian 8 Asts: Ihring 5	Boxscore	Pts: Tola 16; Rebs: Hamati 10; Asts: Dusha, Hysa 3	Arena: Športová Hala Prievidza; Attendance: 1,764; Referees: Zoran Mitrovski (MKD), Viktor Nagy (HUN), Nermin Hodžić (GER)

30 November 2025 EuroBasket 2029 pre-qualifiers – 1st round	Albania	84–99	Kosovo	Shkodër, Albania
18:00 (UTC+1)	Scoring by quarter: 14–25, 14–19, 32–30, 24–25
	Pts: Hamati 19; Rebs: Hamati 10; Asts: Hysa 9	Boxscore	Pts: Berisha 35; Rebs: Kapiti 8 Asts: Armstead 7	Arena: Pallati i Sportit Qazim Dervishi; Attendance: 200; Referees: Mladen Lučić (MNE), Alessandro Perciavalle (ITA), Primož Pipan (SVN)

=== 2026 ===
2 March 2026 EuroBasket 2029 pre-qualifiers – 1st round	Albania	68–94	Slovakia	Shkodër, Albania
18:00 (UTC+1)	Scoring by quarter: 15–17, 20–30, 22–17, 11–30
	Pts: Taflaj, Tola 16; Rebs: Krypci 8 Asts: Tola 4	Boxscore	Pts: DeJulius 26; Rebs: Pavelka 10; Asts: S. Krajčovič 7	Arena: Pallati i Sportit Qazim Dervishi; Attendance: 300; Referees: Mehmet Karabilecen (TUR), Sava Ćetković (MNE), Goran Grbić (SVN)

2 July 2026 EuroBasket 2029 pre-qualifiers – 1st round	Kosovo	82–89	Albania	Prizren, Kosovo
19:00 (UTC+2)	Scoring by quarter: 23–23, 25–24, 17–22, 17–20
	Pts: Berisha 28; Rebs: Hajrizi 15; Asts: Myles 4	Boxscore	Pts: Tyree 25; Rebs: Gaxho 9 Asts: Tyree 8	Arena: Sezai Surroi Sports Hall; Attendance: 700; Referees: Ciprian Stoica (ROU), Landy Pierre (FRA), Diogo Martins (POR)
