= 2023 FIBA Basketball World Cup qualification (Europe) – Pre-qualifiers =

The article describes the European pre-qualifiers for the 2023 FIBA Basketball World Cup qualification.

== First round ==
=== Draw ===
The draw was held on 29 October 2019 and the seeding was based on the FIBA Men's World Ranking.

Pot 1
| Team | Pos |
|---|---|
| Iceland | 46 |
| Belarus | 52 |

Pot 2
| Team | Pos |
|---|---|
| Portugal | 61 |
| Slovakia | 68 |

Pot 3
| Team | Pos |
|---|---|
| Kosovo | 69 |
| Cyprus | 78 |

Pot 4
| Team | Pos |
|---|---|
| Luxembourg | 86 |
| Albania | 109 |

Due to the COVID-19 pandemic, each group played the November window at a single venue. The same was done for the February 2021 games.

All times are local.

=== Group A ===
| Pos | Team | Pld | W | L | PF | PA | PD | Pts | Qualification |
|---|---|---|---|---|---|---|---|---|---|
| 1 | Portugal | 6 | 5 | 1 | 447 | 369 | +78 | 11 (Note: Portugal 131–129 Belarus) | Pre-qualifiers second round |
| 2 | Belarus | 6 | 5 | 1 | 498 | 347 | +151 | 11 | Pre-qualifiers second round |
| 3 | Cyprus | 6 | 1 | 5 | 354 | 481 | −127 | 7 (Note: Cyprus 152–137 Albania) | |
| 4 | Albania | 6 | 1 | 5 | 391 | 493 | −102 | 7 | |

Source: FIBA
Rules for classification: 1) Points; 2) Head-to-head results; 3) Points difference; 4) Points scored.
Notes:

| 20 February 2020 | Cyprus | 41–97 | Belarus | Nicosia |
| 19:00 | Scoring by quarter: 5–22, 13–19, 8–25, 15–31 |
| | Pts: Mantovani 8 Rebs: Mantovani 8 Asts: three players 2 | Boxscore | Pts: Stabrouski 19; Rebs: Liutych 11; Asts: Sitnik 8 | Arena: Eleftheria Indoor Hall; Attendance: 900; Referees: Haris Bijedić (BIH), Nemanja Ninković (SRB), Blaž Zupančič (SLO) |

| 20 February 2020 | Portugal | 70–62 | Albania | Albufeira |
| 18:30 | Scoring by quarter: 9–18, 22–13, 13–16, 26–15 |
| | Pts: Fonseca 16; Rebs: Fonseca, Queiroz 6 Asts: Lisboa, Ventura 4 | Boxscore | Pts: Taflaj 18; Rebs: Lekndreaj 9 Asts: Shestani 7 | Arena: Pavilhão Desportivo de Albufeira; Attendance: 1,400; Referees: Can Mavisu (TUR), Raúl Zamorano (ESP), James Dominique (GIB) |

| 23 February 2020 | Albania | 71–64 | Cyprus | Durrës |
| 17:00 | Scoring by quarter: 14–17, 13–16, 22–15, 22–16 |
| | Pts: Moore 20; Rebs: Hysenagolli 9 Asts: four players 2 | Boxscore | Pts: Michail 17; Rebs: Koumis, Stylianou 6 Asts: Razis 6 | Arena: Dhimitraq Goga Sports Palace; Attendance: 100; Referees: Aleksandar Milojević (MKD), Ivan Miličević (BIH), Jasmina Juras (SRB) |

| 24 February 2020 | Belarus | 72–56 | Portugal | Minsk |
| 19:00 | Scoring by quarter: 19–18, 15–11, 19–18, 19–9 |
| | Pts: Salash 19; Rebs: Veremeenko 9 Asts: Stabrouski 6 | Boxscore | Pts: Wilson 15; Rebs: three players 4 Asts: Ventura 4 | Arena: Minsk Sports Palace; Attendance: 2,500; Referees: Marek Kúkelčík (SVK), Juozas Barkauskas (LTU), Kristaps Konstantinovs (LAT) |

| 26 November 2020 | Belarus | 90–50 | Albania | Matosinhos, Portugal |
| 16:30 | Scoring by quarter: 21–16, 24–7, 23–20, 22–7 |
| | Pts: Parakhouski 17; Rebs: Parakhouski 10; Asts: Mikulski, Trastsinetski 5 | Boxscore | Pts: Lekndreaj 15; Rebs: Shima 7 Asts: Strazimiri 3 | Arena: Centro de Desportos e Congressos; Referees: Charalampos Karakatsounis (GRE), Guido Giovannetti (ITA), Maxime Boubert (FRA) |

| 26 November 2020 | Portugal | 74–56 | Cyprus | Matosinhos |
| 19:30 | Scoring by quarter: 17–21, 27–12, 14–11, 16–12 |
| | Pts: Fonseca 12; Rebs: Fonseca 6 Asts: Lisboa 5 | Boxscore | Pts: Koumis 15; Rebs: Koumis, Mantovani 7 Asts: Michail 5 | Arena: Centro de Desportos e Congressos; Referees: Mart Uuehendrik (EST), Nikola Perlić (CRO), Maxime Boubert (FRA) |

| 28 November 2020 | Belarus | 89–53 | Cyprus | Matosinhos, Portugal |
| 15:00 | Scoring by quarter: 24–9, 24–9, 26–13, 15–22 |
| | Pts: Rahozenka 17; Rebs: Parakhouski 12; Asts: Rubinshteyn 5 | Boxscore | Pts: Michail 9 Rebs: Koumis 6 Asts: Giannaras 3 | Arena: Centro de Desportos e Congressos; Referees: Mart Uuehendrik (EST), Nikola Perlić (CRO), Maxime Boubert (FRA) |

| 28 November 2020 | Albania | 70–88 | Portugal | Matosinhos, Portugal |
| 18:00 | Scoring by quarter: 16–22, 21–26, 24–16, 8–19 |
| | Pts: Shima 18; Rebs: Lekndreaj 7 Asts: Lekndreaj 7 | Boxscore | Pts: Bastos 16; Rebs: Queiroz 8 Asts: Ventura 7 | Arena: Centro de Desportos e Congressos; Referees: Charalampos Karakatsounis (GRE), Guido Giovannetti (ITA), Alberto Sánchez (ESP) |

| 18 February 2021 | Portugal | 75–57 | Belarus | Nicosia, Cyprus |
| 16:00 | Scoring by quarter: 14–12, 25–11, 17–6, 19–28 |
| | Pts: Amarante 14; Rebs: Queiroz, Ventura 6 Asts: Ventura 6 | Boxscore | Pts: Blizniuk, Vikentsyeu 12; Rebs: Vikentsyeu 6 Asts: Blizniuk 5 | Arena: Eleftheria Indoor Hall; Referees: Ciprian Stoica (ROU), Aleksandar Milojević (MKD), Nemanja Ninković (SRB) |

| 18 February 2021 | Cyprus | 88–66 | Albania | Nicosia |
| 19:00 | Scoring by quarter: 18–22, 14–12, 26–15, 30–17 |
| | Pts: Iliadis 21; Rebs: Koumis 7 Asts: Eleftheriou 6 | Boxscore | Pts: Pullazi 17; Rebs: Hysenagolli 9 Asts: Shestani 5 | Arena: Eleftheria Indoor Hall; Referees: Ilya Putenko (RUS), Péter Praksch (HUN), Franko Gracin (CRO) |

| 20 February 2021 | Cyprus | 52–84 | Portugal | Nicosia |
| 16:00 | Scoring by quarter: 13–21, 9–24, 16–17, 14–22 |
| | Pts: Stylianou 15; Rebs: Maragkos 7 Asts: three players 2 | Boxscore | Pts: Borovnjak 21; Rebs: Borovnjak 11; Asts: Barbosa 6 | Arena: Eleftheria Indoor Hall; Attendance: 49; Referees: Aleksandar Milojević (MKD), Ciprian Stoica (ROU), Ilya Putenko (RUS) |

| 20 February 2021 | Albania | 72–93 | Belarus | Nicosia, Cyprus |
| 19:00 | Scoring by quarter: 24–25, 15–19, 16–26, 17–23 |
| | Pts: Taflaj 16; Rebs: Hysenagolli 10; Asts: Bedini, Hysenagolli 4 | Boxscore | Pts: Beliankou 26; Rebs: Salash, Vikentsyeu 6 Asts: Blizniuk 7 | Arena: Eleftheria Indoor Hall; Attendance: 5 Referees: Nemanja Ninković (SRB), Péter Praksch (HUN), Franko Gracin (CRO) |

=== Group B ===
| Pos | Team | Pld | W | L | PF | PA | PD | Pts | Qualification |
|---|---|---|---|---|---|---|---|---|---|
| 1 | Iceland | 6 | 5 | 1 | 517 | 455 | +62 | 11 | Pre-qualifiers second round |
| 2 | Slovakia | 6 | 3 | 3 | 467 | 459 | +8 | 9 | Pre-qualifiers second round |
| 3 | Luxembourg | 6 | 2 | 4 | 481 | 495 | −14 | 8 (Note: Luxembourg 179–173 Kosovo) | |
| 4 | Kosovo | 6 | 2 | 4 | 455 | 511 | −56 | 8 | |

Source: FIBA
Rules for classification: 1) Points; 2) Head-to-head results; 3) Points difference; 4) Points scored.
Notes:

| 20 February 2020 | Slovakia | 73–65 | Luxembourg | Bratislava |
| 18:00 | Scoring by quarter: 20–25, 20–13, 19–11, 14–16 |
| | Pts: Brodziansky 25; Rebs: Brodziansky, Körner 7 Asts: Ihring 8 | Boxscore | Pts: Rugg 21; Rebs: Rugg 20; Asts: five players 2 | Arena: Eurovia Aréna; Attendance: 1,100; Referees: Charalampos Karakatsounis (GRE), Gvidas Gedvilas (LTU), Valerio Grigioni (ITA) |

| 20 February 2020 | Kosovo | 80–78 | Iceland | Pristina |
| 19:00 | Scoring by quarter: 22–13, 13–21, 25–23, 20–21 |
| | Pts: Berisha 18; Rebs: Hajrizi 8 Asts: Hajrizi 6 | Boxscore | Pts: Jónsson 21; Rebs: Hlinason 12; Asts: Vilhjálmsson 6 | Arena: Palace of Youth and Sports; Attendance: 2,500; Referees: Ciprian Stoica (ROU), Ivor Matějek (CZE), Mehmet Karabilecen (TUR) |

| 23 February 2020 | Luxembourg | 80–84 | Kosovo | Luxembourg City |
| 18:00 | Scoring by quarter: 20–25, 25–19, 20–16, 15–24 |
| | Pts: Rugg 30; Rebs: Rugg 8 Asts: Grün 9 | Boxscore | Pts: Hajrizi 25; Rebs: Hajrizi 7 Asts: Berisha 6 | Arena: d'Coque; Attendance: 1,600; Referees: Paulo Marques (POR), Ilias Kounelles (CYP), Petr Hruša (CZE) |

| 23 February 2020 | Iceland | 83–74 | Slovakia | Reykjavík |
| 20:00 | Scoring by quarter: 17–14, 26–20, 20–20, 20–20 |
| | Pts: Hlinason 26; Rebs: Hlinason 17; Asts: Ermolinskij 11 | Boxscore | Pts: Brodziansky 16; Rebs: Jones 8 Asts: Ihring 5 | Arena: Laugardalshöll; Attendance: 1,080; Referees: Marek Maliszewski (POL), Nikola Bejat (NOR), Steve Bittner (GER) |

| 26 November 2020 | Iceland | 90–76 | Luxembourg | Bratislava, Slovakia |
| 16:00 | Scoring by quarter: 23–24, 11–14, 32–21, 24–17 |
| | Pts: Hlinason 17; Rebs: Hlinason 11; Asts: Steinarsson 5 | Boxscore | Pts: Rugg 26; Rebs: Vujakovic 8 Asts: Vujakovic 4 | Arena: Eurovia Aréna; Referees: Christoph Rohacky (AUT), Simon Unsworth (GBR), Sergiy Chaykovskyy (UKR) |

| 26 November 2020 | Slovakia | 91–67 | Kosovo | Bratislava |
| 19:00 | Scoring by quarter: 21–9, 21–20, 20–13, 29–25 |
| | Pts: Brodziansky 26; Rebs: Brodziansky 12; Asts: Ihring 7 | Boxscore | Pts: Hajrizi 17; Rebs: Rugova 7 Asts: Hajrizi 6 | Arena: Eurovia Aréna; Referees: Ciprian Stoica (ROU), Péter Praksch (HUN), Vasileios Pitsilkas (GRE) |

| 28 November 2020 | Iceland | 86–62 | Kosovo | Bratislava, Slovakia |
| 16:00 | Scoring by quarter: 21–17, 24–12, 22–14, 19–19 |
| | Pts: Vilhjálmsson 22; Rebs: Hlinason 9 Asts: Guðmundsson 7 | Boxscore | Pts: Bunjaku 12; Rebs: Hajrizi, Zenelaj 6 Asts: Bunjaku 4 | Arena: Eurovia Aréna; Referees: Ciprian Stoica (ROU), Sergiy Chaykovskyy (UKR), Vasileios Pitsilkas (GRE) |

| 28 November 2020 | Luxembourg | 77–73 | Slovakia | Bratislava, Slovakia |
| 19:00 | Scoring by quarter: 15–16, 16–14, 20–22, 26–21 |
| | Pts: Rugg 23; Rebs: Laurent 9 Asts: Delgado 5 | Boxscore | Pts: Ihring 22; Rebs: Körner 10; Asts: Krajčovič 8 | Arena: Eurovia Aréna; Referees: Christoph Rohacky (AUT), Péter Praksch (HUN), Tamás Földhazi (HUN) |

| 18 February 2021 | Slovakia | 79–94 | Iceland | Pristina, Kosovo |
| 16:00 | Scoring by quarter: 20–20, 19–23, 16–36, 24–15 |
| | Pts: Brodziansky 25; Rebs: Brodziansky, Ihring 9 Asts: Krajčovič 4 | Boxscore | Pts: Guðmundsson 29; Rebs: Hlinason 14; Asts: Friðriksson 10 | Arena: Palace of Youth and Sports; Referees: Semen Ovinov (RUS), Ali Şakacı (TUR), Jan Baloun (CZE) |

| 18 February 2021 | Kosovo | 89–99 | Luxembourg | Pristina |
| 19:00 | Scoring by quarter: 23–32, 23–23, 24–20, 19–24 |
| | Pts: Myles 21; Rebs: Hajrizi, Myles 7 Asts: Berisha 6 | Boxscore | Pts: Rugg 22; Rebs: Rugg 17; Asts: Melcher 9 | Arena: Palace of Youth and Sports; Referees: Petros Papapetrou (GRE), Nikolaos Somos (GRE), Sergio Rodríguez (ESP) |

| 20 February 2021 | Luxembourg | 84–86 | Iceland | Pristina, Kosovo |
| 16:00 | Scoring by quarter: 23–29, 20–28, 26–14, 15–15 |
| | Pts: Vujakovic 20; Rebs: Rugg 13; Asts: Gutenkauf, Laurent 5 | Boxscore | Pts: Hlinason 25; Rebs: Guðmundsson 10; Asts: Guðmundsson 9 | Arena: Palace of Youth and Sports; Referees: Nikolaos Somos (GRE), Sergio Rodríguez (ESP), Polat Parlak (BUL) |

| 20 February 2021 | Kosovo | 73–77 | Slovakia | Pristina |
| 19:00 | Scoring by quarter: 23–15, 14–20, 17–20, 19–22 |
| | Pts: Berisha 24; Rebs: Hajrizi 9 Asts: Myles 6 | Boxscore | Pts: Brodziansky 28; Rebs: Brodziansky 18; Asts: Krajčovič 5 | Arena: Palace of Youth and Sports; Referees: Petros Papapetrou (GRE), Semen Ovinov (RUS), Ali Şakacı (TUR) |

== Second round ==
The four qualified teams were joined by the eight teams that were eliminated from the EuroBasket 2022 qualifiers.

=== Draw ===
The draw was made on 28 April 2021. Teams that advanced from the previous round were assigned to Pot 3, while teams eliminated from EuroBasket 2022 qualifiers were assigned to Pots 1 or 2, according to FIBA rankings.

Pot 1
| Team | Pos |
|---|---|
| Montenegro | 26 |
| Latvia | 27 |
| North Macedonia | 52 |
| Sweden | 54 |

Pot 2
| Team | Pos |
|---|---|
| Romania | 55 |
| Denmark | 56 |
| ~~Austria~~ | ~~57~~ |
| Switzerland | 61 |

Pot 3
| Team | Pos |
|---|---|
| Iceland | 46 |
| Belarus | 51 |
| Portugal | 58 |
| Slovakia | 63 |

Austria withdrew before this round had commenced and was replaced by Luxembourg, as best ranked team from the previous round which did not advance, on 19 June 2021.

Due to the COVID-19 pandemic, each group played the August window at a single venue.

All times are local.

=== Group C ===
| Pos | Team | Pld | W | L | PF | PA | PD | Pts | Qualification |
|---|---|---|---|---|---|---|---|---|---|
| 1 | Sweden | 4 | 3 | 1 | 379 | 273 | +106 | 7 (Note: Sweden 156–139 Portugal) | Qualifiers |
| 2 | Portugal (H) | 4 | 3 | 1 | 302 | 304 | −2 | 7 | Qualifiers |
| 3 | Luxembourg (Note: Luxembourg replaced Austria, who withdrew before the start of the round.) | 4 | 0 | 4 | 282 | 386 | −104 | 4 | |

Source: FIBA
Rules for classification: 1) Points; 2) Head-to-head results; 3) Points difference; 4) Points scored.
(H) Hosts
Notes:

| 12 August 2021 | Sweden | 77–79 | Portugal | Matosinhos, Portugal |
| 18:00 | Scoring by quarter: 14–16, 18–22, 21–23, 24–18 |
| | Pts: Czerapowicz 16; Rebs: Birgander 11; Asts: Håkanson 11 | Boxscore | Pts: Borovnjak 20; Rebs: Borovnjak, Queiroz 6 Asts: Barbosa, Silva 6 | Arena: Centro de Desportos e Congressos de Matosinhos; Attendance: 500; Referees: Erez Gurion (ISR), Martin Vulić (CRO), Gvidas Gedvilas (LTU) |

| 13 August 2021 | Portugal | 83–74 | Luxembourg | Matosinhos |
| 18:00 | Scoring by quarter: 21–12, 26–16, 20–26, 16–20 |
| | Pts: De Sousa 20; Rebs: Delgado, Queiroz 8 Asts: Barbosa 7 | Boxscore | Pts: Laurent 14; Rebs: Laurent 10; Asts: Rugg 4 | Arena: Centro de Desportos e Congressos de Matosinhos; Attendance: 300; Referees: Andris Aunkrogers (LAT), Zdravko Rutešić (MNE), Tanel Suslov (EST) |

| 14 August 2021 | Luxembourg | 76–129 | Sweden | Matosinhos, Portugal |
| 18:00 | Scoring by quarter: 21–33, 21–30, 9–40, 25–26 |
| | Pts: Gutenkauf, Kovac 14; Rebs: five players 3 Asts: Grün 5 | Boxscore | Pts: Czerapowicz 24; Rebs: Birgander 8 Asts: Håkanson 9 | Arena: Centro de Desportos e Congressos de Matosinhos; Attendance: 25; Referees: Tanel Suslov (EST), Andris Aunkrogers (LAT), Martin Vulić (CRO) |

| 16 August 2021 | Portugal | 60–79 | Sweden | Matosinhos |
| 18:00 | Scoring by quarter: 12–16, 20–15, 12–23, 16–25 |
| | Pts: Brito 12; Rebs: Delgado 8 Asts: Barbosa 3 | Boxscore | Pts: Andersson 18; Rebs: three players 7 Asts: Håkanson 7 | Arena: Centro de Desportos e Congressos de Matosinhos; Attendance: 500; Referees: Andris Aunkrogers (LAT), Tanel Suslov (EST), Martin Vulić (CRO) |

| 17 August 2021 | Luxembourg | 74–80 | Portugal | Matosinhos, Portugal |
| 18:00 | Scoring by quarter: 19–23, 27–25, 7–13, 21–19 |
| | Pts: Rugg 20; Rebs: Rugg 6 Asts: Melcher 6 | Boxscore | Pts: Borovnjak 17; Rebs: Queiroz 7 Asts: three players 3 | Arena: Centro de Desportos e Congressos de Matosinhos; Attendance: 500; Referees: Martin Vulić (CRO), Erez Gurion (ISR), Zdravko Rutešić (MNE) |

| 18 August 2021 | Sweden | 94–58 | Luxembourg | Matosinhos, Portugal |
| 18:00 | Scoring by quarter: 24–19, 19–11, 28–14, 23–14 |
| | Pts: Barton 22; Rebs: Czerapowicz 10; Asts: Barton 10 | Boxscore | Pts: Vujakovic 16; Rebs: Vujakovic 9 Asts: Vujakovic 4 | Arena: Centro de Desportos e Congressos de Matosinhos; Attendance: 25; Referees: Zdravko Rutešić (MNE), Erez Gurion (ISR), Gvidas Gedvilas (LTU) |

=== Group D ===
| Pos | Team | Pld | W | L | PF | PA | PD | Pts | Qualification |
|---|---|---|---|---|---|---|---|---|---|
| 1 | Latvia (H) | 4 | 4 | 0 | 362 | 284 | +78 | 8 | Qualifiers |
| 2 | Belarus | 4 | 2 | 2 | 314 | 313 | +1 | 6 | Qualifiers |
| 3 | Romania | 4 | 0 | 4 | 279 | 358 | −79 | 4 | |

Source: FIBA
Rules for classification: 1) Points; 2) Head-to-head results; 3) Points difference; 4) Points scored.
(H) Hosts

| 7 August 2021 | Romania | 72–108 | Latvia | Riga, Latvia |
| 19:30 | Scoring by quarter: 16–37, 9–20, 22–29, 25–22 |
| | Pts: Tohătan 17; Rebs: Uta 5 Asts: Gheorghe 5 | Boxscore | Pts: three players 15; Rebs: Strautiņš 9 Asts: Zoriks 10 | Arena: Arena Riga; Attendance: 1,450; Referees: Sergii Zashchuk (UKR), Radomir Vojinović (MNE), Can Mavisu (TUR) |

| 8 August 2021 | Latvia | 92–83 | Belarus | Riga |
| 19:30 | Scoring by quarter: 21–20, 24–24, 20–23, 27–16 |
| | Pts: Bertāns 20; Rebs: Meiers 9 Asts: Strēlnieks, Zoriks 5 | Boxscore | Pts: Parakhouski 16; Rebs: Parakhouski 7 Asts: Sitnik 6 | Arena: Arena Riga; Attendance: 1,430; Referees: Igor Mitrovski (MKD), Dariusz Zapolski (POL), Josip Jurčević (CRO) |

| 9 August 2021 | Belarus | 77–72 | Romania | Riga, Latvia |
| 19:30 | Scoring by quarter: 19–19, 19–20, 22–22, 17–11 |
| | Pts: Sitnik 20; Rebs: Parakhouski 11; Asts: four players 2 | Boxscore | Pts: Richard 14; Rebs: Uta 8 Asts: Tohătan 6 | Arena: Arena Riga; Attendance: 30; Referees: Sergii Zashchuk (UKR), Dariusz Zapolski (POL), Josip Jurčević (CRO) |

| 11 August 2021 | Latvia | 79–69 | Romania | Riga |
| 19:30 | Scoring by quarter: 15–17, 30–13, 11–14, 23–25 |
| | Pts: Lomažs 21; Rebs: Mejeris 5 Asts: Zoriks 7 | Boxscore | Pts: Richard 17; Rebs: three players 4 Asts: Tohătan 4 | Arena: Arena Riga; Attendance: 1,900; Referees: Igor Mitrovski (MKD), Radomir Vojinović (MNE), Can Mavisu (TUR) |

| 12 August 2021 | Belarus | 60–83 | Latvia | Riga, Latvia |
| 19:30 | Scoring by quarter: 15–20, 20–23, 16–24, 9–16 |
| | Pts: Rubinshteyn, Stabrouski 15; Rebs: Rubinshteyn 5 Asts: Aladka 4 | Boxscore | Pts: Gražulis 22; Rebs: Gražulis 9 Asts: Zoriks 8 | Arena: Arena Riga; Attendance: 2,100; Referees: Sergii Zashchuk (UKR), Igor Mitrovski (MKD), Radomir Vojinović (MNE) |

| 13 August 2021 | Romania | 66–94 | Belarus | Riga, Latvia |
| 19:30 | Scoring by quarter: 8–26, 15–24, 25–20, 18–24 |
| | Pts: Richard 15; Rebs: Cățe 7 Asts: Gheorghe 6 | Boxscore | Pts: Parakhouski 21; Rebs: Parakhouski 11; Asts: Beliankou, Blizniuk 6 | Arena: Arena Riga; Attendance: 20; Referees: Sergii Zashchuk (UKR), Dariusz Zapolski (POL), Josip Jurčević (CRO) |

=== Group E ===
| Pos | Team | Pld | W | L | PF | PA | PD | Pts | Qualification |
|---|---|---|---|---|---|---|---|---|---|
| 1 | Montenegro (H) | 4 | 4 | 0 | 323 | 284 | +39 | 8 | Qualifiers |
| 2 | Iceland | 4 | 2 | 2 | 329 | 308 | +21 | 6 | Qualifiers |
| 3 | Denmark | 4 | 0 | 4 | 278 | 338 | −60 | 4 | |

Source: FIBA
Rules for classification: 1) Points; 2) Head-to-head results; 3) Points difference; 4) Points scored.
(H) Hosts

| 12 August 2021 | Montenegro | 83–69 | Iceland | Podgorica |
| 20:00 | Scoring by quarter: 16–8, 23–25, 21–20, 23–16 |
| | Pts: Ivanović, Todorović 18; Rebs: Barović 7 Asts: Cobbs 4 | Boxscore | Pts: Friðriksson 16; Rebs: Nathanaelsson 6 Asts: Friðriksson, Steinarsson 4 | Arena: Bemax Arena; Attendance: 87; Referees: Marius Ciulin (ROU), Zafer Yılmaz (TUR), Gintaras Vitkauskas (LTU) |

| 13 August 2021 | Iceland | 91–70 | Denmark | Podgorica, Montenegro |
| 20:00 | Scoring by quarter: 22–23, 21–16, 22–12, 26–19 |
| | Pts: Friðriksson 30; Rebs: Hlinason, Vilhjálmsson 9 Asts: Steinarsson 7 | Boxscore | Pts: Mortensen 27; Rebs: Aris, Nielsen 5 Asts: Aris 8 | Arena: Bemax Arena; Attendance: 98; Referees: Georgios Poursanidis (GRE), Ivor Matějek (CZE), Valentin Oliot (FRA) |

| 14 August 2021 | Denmark | 68–79 | Montenegro | Podgorica, Montenegro |
| 20:00 | Scoring by quarter: 13–25, 22–21, 20–12, 13–21 |
| | Pts: Aris 15; Rebs: Mortensen 8 Asts: Nielsen 6 | Boxscore | Pts: Ivanović 18; Rebs: Barović 6 Asts: Popović 4 | Arena: Bemax Arena; Attendance: 100; Referees: Georgios Poursanidis (GRE), Zafer Yılmaz (TUR), Ivor Matějek (CZE) |

| 16 August 2021 | Iceland | 80–82 | Montenegro | Podgorica, Montenegro |
| 20:00 | Scoring by quarter: 25–27, 21–14, 25–20, 9–21 |
| | Pts: Hlinason 21; Rebs: Hlinason 10; Asts: Vilhjálmsson 6 | Boxscore | Pts: Radončić 19; Rebs: Radončić 7 Asts: Ivanović 5 | Arena: Bemax Arena; Attendance: 1 Referees: Marius Ciulin (ROU), Georgios Poursanidis (GRE), Gintaras Vitkauskas (LTU) |

| 17 August 2021 | Denmark | 73–89 | Iceland | Podgorica, Montenegro |
| 20:00 | Scoring by quarter: 18–26, 21–21, 12–23, 22–19 |
| | Pts: Mortensen 14; Rebs: Bonde 6 Asts: Nielsen 5 | Boxscore | Pts: Friðriksson 21; Rebs: Acox 9 Asts: Friðriksson 8 | Arena: Bemax Arena; Attendance: 1 Referees: Marius Ciulin (ROU), Zafer Yılmaz (TUR), Ivor Matějek (CZE) |

| 18 August 2021 | Montenegro | 79–67 | Denmark | Podgorica |
| 20:00 | Scoring by quarter: 26–12, 13–15, 18–17, 22–23 |
| | Pts: Drobnjak 15; Rebs: Radončić 9 Asts: Popović 3 | Boxscore | Pts: Aris 16; Rebs: Bonde 9 Asts: Aris 3 | Arena: Bemax Arena; Attendance: 1 Referees: Georgios Poursanidis (GRE), Gintaras Vitkauskas (LTU), Valentin Oliot (FRA) |

=== Group F ===
| Pos | Team | Pld | W | L | PF | PA | PD | Pts | Qualification |
|---|---|---|---|---|---|---|---|---|---|
| 1 | North Macedonia (H) | 4 | 2 | 2 | 270 | 263 | +7 | 6 | Qualifiers |
| 2 | Slovakia | 4 | 2 | 2 | 259 | 262 | −3 | 6 | Qualifiers |
| 3 | Switzerland | 4 | 2 | 2 | 249 | 253 | −4 | 6 | |

Source: FIBA
Rules for classification: 1) Points; 2) Head-to-head results; 3) Points difference; 4) Points scored.
(H) Hosts

| 12 August 2021 | North Macedonia | 62–67 | Switzerland | Skopje |
| 19:00 | Scoring by quarter: 17–22, 8–13, 17–14, 20–18 |
| | Pts: Mekić 16; Rebs: Wiley 13; Asts: Magdevski 6 | Boxscore | Pts: Kazadi 19; Rebs: Ročak 8 Asts: Kazadi 6 | Arena: Sports Centre Jane Sandanski; Attendance: 10; Referees: Oskars Lucis (LAT), Fernando Calatrava (ESP), Ilias Kounelles (CYP) |

| 13 August 2021 | Switzerland | 56–64 | Slovakia | Skopje, North Macedonia |
| 19:00 | Scoring by quarter: 14–11, 20–19, 14–19, 8–15 |
| | Pts: Fofana, Kazadi 12; Rebs: Jurkovitz 6 Asts: Kazadi 4 | Boxscore | Pts: Krajčovič 16; Rebs: Brodziansky 7 Asts: Ihring 9 | Arena: Sports Centre Jane Sandanski; Attendance: 20; Referees: Tolga Sahin (TUR), Michał Proc (POL), Mehmet Karabilecen (TUR) |

| 14 August 2021 | Slovakia | 47–69 | North Macedonia | Skopje, North Macedonia |
| 19:00 | Scoring by quarter: 10–22, 14–13, 18–11, 5–23 |
| | Pts: Brodziansky 11; Rebs: Brodziansky 15; Asts: Brodziansky 3 | Boxscore | Pts: Trajkovski 16; Rebs: Trajkovski 8 Asts: Nikolov 6 | Arena: Sports Centre Jane Sandanski; Attendance: 200; Referees: Fernando Calatrava (ESP), Tolga Sahin (TUR), Michał Proc (POL) |

| 16 August 2021 | Switzerland | 61–67 | North Macedonia | Skopje, North Macedonia |
| 19:00 | Scoring by quarter: 10–18, 16–21, 20–13, 15–15 |
| | Pts: Kazadi 15; Rebs: Ročak 9 Asts: Kazadi, Rocak 4 | Boxscore | Pts: Mekić 16; Rebs: Krstevski 7 Asts: Trajkovski 4 | Arena: Sports Centre Jane Sandanski; Attendance: 150; Referees: Oskars Lucis (LAT), Michał Proc (POL), Mehmet Karabilecen (TUR) |

| 17 August 2021 | Slovakia | 60–65 | Switzerland | Skopje, North Macedonia |
| 19:00 | Scoring by quarter: 14–15, 11–26, 13–14, 22–10 |
| | Pts: Brodziansky, Krajčovič 13; Rebs: Brodziansky 10; Asts: Krajčovič 8 | Boxscore | Pts: Ročak 14; Rebs: Jurkovitz 12; Asts: Kazadi 4 | Arena: Sports Centre Jane Sandanski; Attendance: 50; Referees: Fernando Calatrava (ESP), Oskars Lucis (LAT), Ilias Kounelles (CYP) |

| 18 August 2021 | North Macedonia | 72–88 | Slovakia | Skopje |
| 19:00 | Scoring by quarter: 13–17, 19–21, 19–28, 21–22 |
| | Pts: Nikolov 17; Rebs: Mekić 5 Asts: Nikolov, Stajić 5 | Boxscore | Pts: Fusek 23; Rebs: Brodziansky 10; Asts: Krajčovič 13 | Arena: Sports Centre Jane Sandanski; Referees: Tolga Sahin (TUR), Michał Proc (POL), Mehmet Karabilecen (TUR) |
