= 2017–18 Brose Bamberg season =

Brose Bamberg
2017–18 season
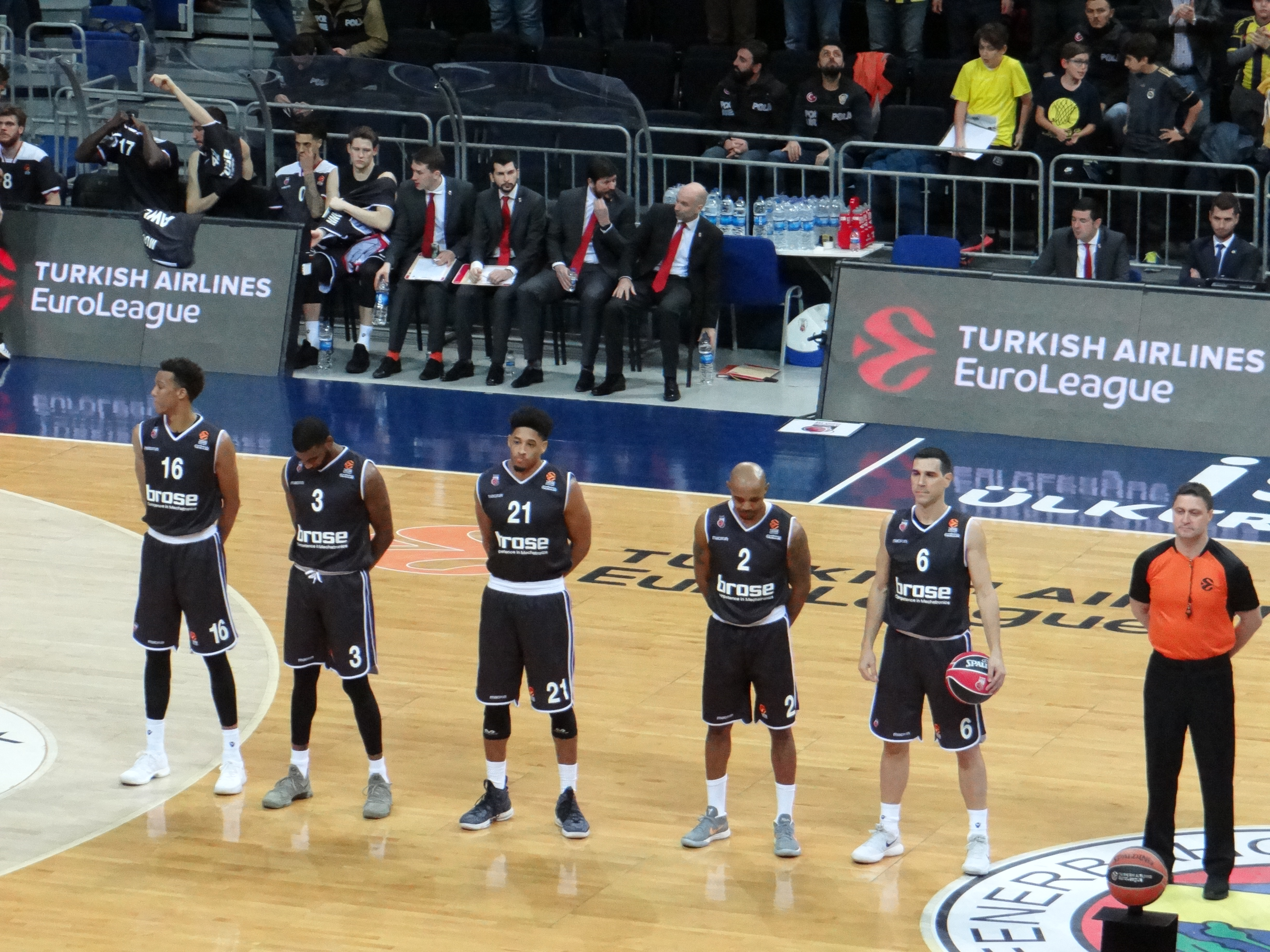
- Starting five of Bamberg for a game against Fenerbahçe on 9 February 2018
- Chairman: Norbert Sieben
- Head coach: Andrea Trinchieri (August–February); Ilias Kantzouris (interim); Luca Banchi (March–May)
- Arena: Brose Arena
- Basketball Bundesliga: Semi-finalist (lost to Bayern Munich)
- BBL-Pokal: Qualifying round (knocked out by Bayern Munich)
- EuroLeague: 12th place
Uniform
Uniform
EuroLeague

The 2017–18 Brose Bamberg season was the 63rd season of the German professional basketball club based in Bamberg. The team will play in the Basketball Bundesliga (BBL). Because of its championship in the previous BBL season, Bamberg would play in its third consecutive EuroLeague season.

This season was the fourth one under head coach Andrea Trinchieri. On 19 February, Trinchieri was released from his head coaching position by the club, after the team lost 12 of their last 15 games.

== Club ==
=== Technical staff ===
Position	Staff
Head coach	Andrea Trinchieri; Ilias Kantzouris (interim); Luca Banchi
Assistant coaches	Federico Perego; Stefan Weissenböck
Athletic coach	Sandro Bencardino
Video scout	Dominik Günthner

Source: Brose Bamberg

=== Kit ===
Supplier: Macron / Sponsor: Brose

Home	Away

== Roster ==
2017–18 2017–18 Brose Bamberg roster
Players
Coaches

Pos.	No.	Nat.	Name	Ht.	Wt.	Age	From
G	0	(Italy)	Hackett, Daniel	1.98 m (6 ft 6 in)	96 kg (212 lb)	37 – 19 December 1987	Olympiacos
F	20	(Germany)	Harris, Elias (C)	2.03 m (6 ft 8 in)	108 kg (238 lb)	35 – 6 July 1989	Los Angeles D-Fenders
SF	33	(Germany)	Heckmann, Patrick	1.98 m (6 ft 6 in)	86 kg (190 lb)	33 – 27 February 1992	Boston College
G	2	(Georgia (country))	Hickman, Ricky	1.89 m (6 ft 2 in)	88 kg (194 lb)	39 – 1 September 1985	Olimpia Milano
PG	12	(Germany)	Lô, Maodo	1.91 m (6 ft 3 in)	86 kg (190 lb)	33 – 12 March 1992	Columbia
PF	9	(Serbia)	Mitrović, Luka	2.06 m (6 ft 9 in)	102 kg (225 lb)	31 – 21 March 1993	KK Crvena zvezda
PG	7	(Slovenia)	Nikolić, Aleksej (ProA)	1.91 m (6 ft 3 in)	92 kg (203 lb)	30 – 21 February 1995	Spars Sarajevo
G/F	16	(Germany)	Olinde, Louis	2.05 m (6 ft 9 in)	82 kg (181 lb)	26 – 19 March 1998	Hamburg Towers
F/C	43	(Croatia)	Radošević, Leon	2.09 m (6 ft 10 in)	114 kg (251 lb)	35 – 26 February 1990	Beşiktaş
PF	21	(United States)	Rubit, Augustine	2.01 m (6 ft 7 in)	107 kg (236 lb)	35 – 14 August 1989	ratiopharm Ulm
SG	8	(Germany)	Staiger, Lucca	1.96 m (6 ft 5 in)	93 kg (205 lb)	36 – 14 June 1988	FC Bayern Munich
SG	44	(United States)	Taylor, Bryce	1.95 m (6 ft 5 in)	95 kg (209 lb)	38 – 27 September 1986	FC Bayern Munich
G	6	(Greece)	Zisis, Nikos	1.97 m (6 ft 6 in)	98 kg (216 lb)	41 – 16 August 1983	Fenerbahçe

Head coach

- (Italy) Luca Banchi

Assistant coach(es)

- (Greece) Ilias Kantzouris
- (Italy) Federico Perego
- (Italy) Sandro Bencardino

Legend

- (C) Team captain
- (ProA) On assignment to ProA
  side Baunach Young Pikes.
- Injured

- Roster
Updated: March 3rd, 2018

== Competitions ==
=== Basketball Bundesliga ===
Pos	Team	Pld	W	L	PF	PA	PD	Pts	Qualification or relegation
2	Alba Berlin	34	29	5	3044	2540	+504	58	Playoffs
3	MHP Riesen Ludwigsburg	34	26	8	2932	2574	+358	52	Playoffs
4	Brose Bamberg	34	22	12	2789	2594	+195	44	Playoffs
5	Telekom Baskets Bonn	34	21	13	2815	2667	+148	42 (Note: Bonn 6 Pts; Bayreuth 4 Pts; Oldenburg 2 Pts)	Playoffs
6	Medi Bayreuth	34	21	13	2849	2756	+93	42	Playoffs

Source: Beko BBL
Rules for classification: 1) Points; 2) Head-to-head; 3) Points difference; 4) Points scored.

=== BBL-Pokal ===
==== Qualifying round ====
21 January 2018	Bayern Munich	101–97(OT)	Brose Bamberg	Audi Dome, Munich
19:00	Scoring by quarter: 25–30, 15–10, 25–21, 21–25, Overtime: 15–11
	Pts: Reggie Redding 24; Rebs: Devin Booker 7 Asts: Hobbs, Redding 3	Boxscore	Pts: Daniel Hackett 21; Rebs: Augustine Rubit 7 Asts: Daniel Hackett 4	Attendance: 6,523; Referees: Robert Lottermoser, Nesa Kovačević, Clemens Fritz
