= Salesianum Zug =

Coordinates: 47.154910°N 8.511475°E

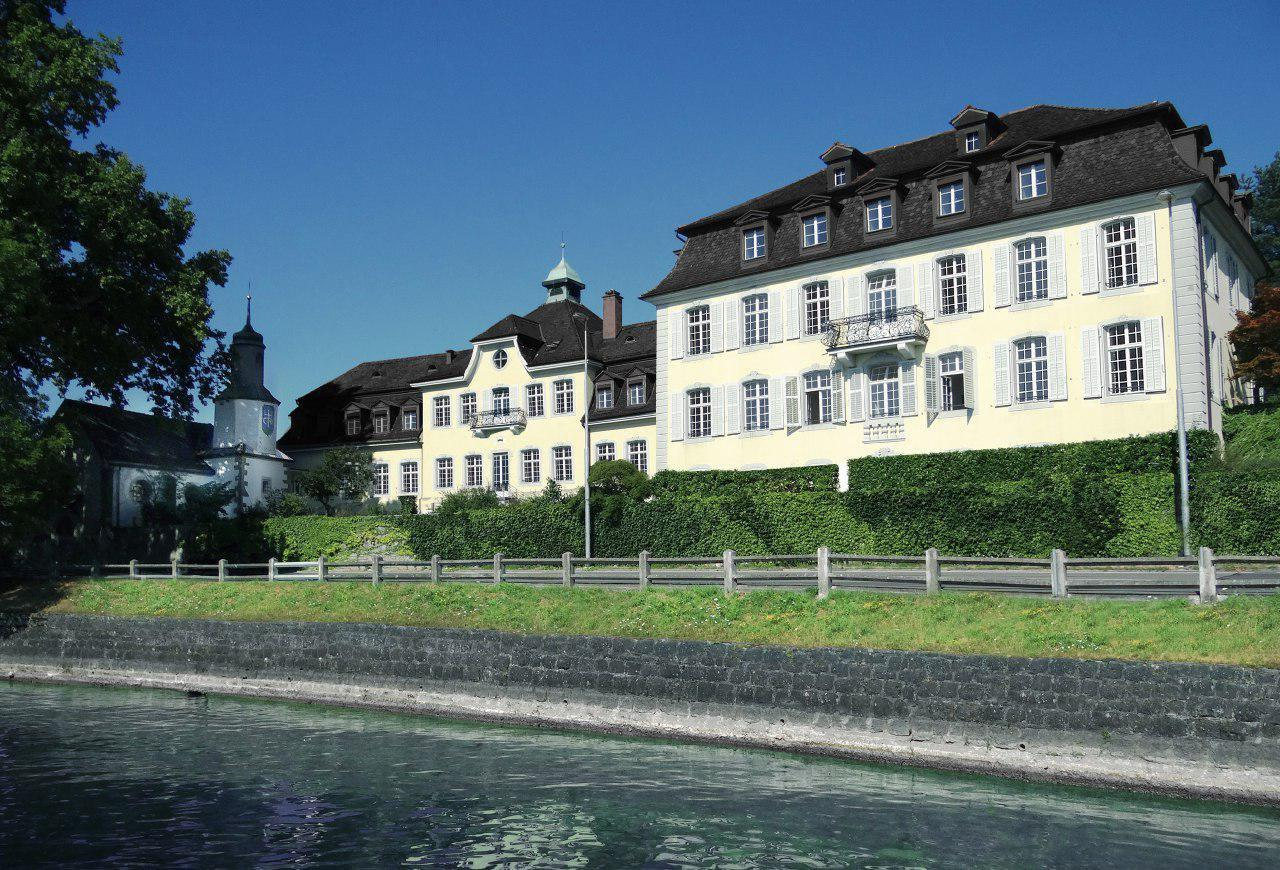
Salesianum Zug, Street view (Photo: 2018)

The Salesianum, also known as the "Pearl of Zug" or St. Karlshof, is a historic estate and mansion, located in the southernmost part of the town of Zug, Switzerland along the lake, in the direction of Oberwil.

Built in several stages Salesianum comprises the St. Karl Borromäus chapel (built 1615/1637), the baroque inspired Herrenhaus (built 1750) and the French-style inspired Mittelbau (built 1750-1769). The building has undergone several modifications since 1750 continuing until the present. A number of auxiliary buildings of varying age, not directly connected to the main buildings, make up the remainder of the complex as it stands today.

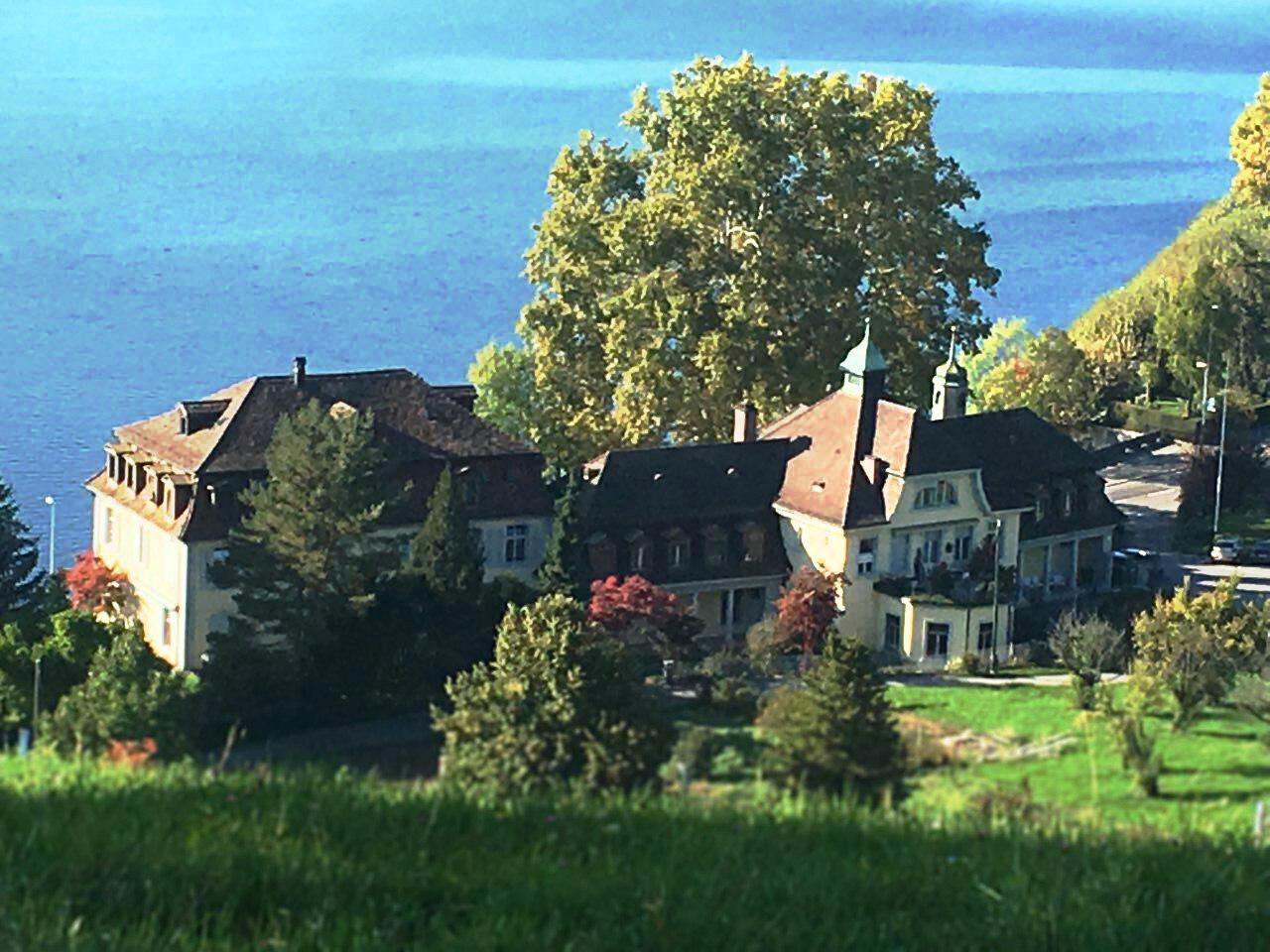
Salesianum Zug, from the East (Photo: 2018)

== History ==
The St. Karlshof, where the Salesianum is located, gets its name from Saint Charles Borromeo (Karl Borromäus), a papal emissary. According to a legend he crossed the Lake Zug in 1570 with a boat from Buonas and set his feet on the dry land of Zug for the first time at this location. In his honour and name, the chapel was constructed in 1615 by Jakob Stocker. The chapel was renovated in 1637 by Kaspar Weissenbach. In 1744 the estate was taken over by Johann Kaspar Lutiger, who constructed the southern Herrenhaus in 1750, and later the Mittelbau (1750-1769) was built to connect the chapel with the Herrenhaus.

In 1840 Peter Zwyssig from Baden bought the estate. In the beginning of the same decade, as monasteries were being nationalized, the brother of Peter Zwyssig, Alberich Zwyssig, fled from the monastery of Wettingen to the St. Karlshof in Zug. While residing there and in the chapel of St. Karl, Alberich Zwyssig wrote the "Schweizerpsalm", the national anthem for the Swiss Confederation. In 1846 the St. Karlshof was sold to Franz Anton Wickart.

In 1898 the property was bought by the Institute of Menzingen, under Mother Salesia Strickler, a native Menzinger from Bumbachhof. The French-style villa and mansion were renamed the Salesianum in her honour.

Between 1898 and 1970, the Menzingen nuns ran Institut Salesianum, a day and boarding school on the premises. Until 2002, the premises continued to be used to educate young ladies with learning disabilities.

Then, between 2003 and 2010, the property housed the Riverside Campus of the International School of Zug and Luzern (ISZL).

In 2011, the real-estate developer Alfred Müller AG bought the property from the Menzinger Sisters. From 2015 until 2018 the property was rented out to the Canton of Zug for the purpose of housing refugees and asylum seekers.

Recently, the 18th century estate was bought by Niklas Nikolajsen, a Faroese-Danish investor and early adopter in the fields of cryptocurrencies and cryptofinance, who founded Bitcoin Suisse AG. Niklas Nikolajsen is now in the process of renovating the estate, which is expected to finish by the end of 2022.

The historic property with the north-facing chapel and the southern added Herrenhaus is under historic protection under Denkmalschutz.

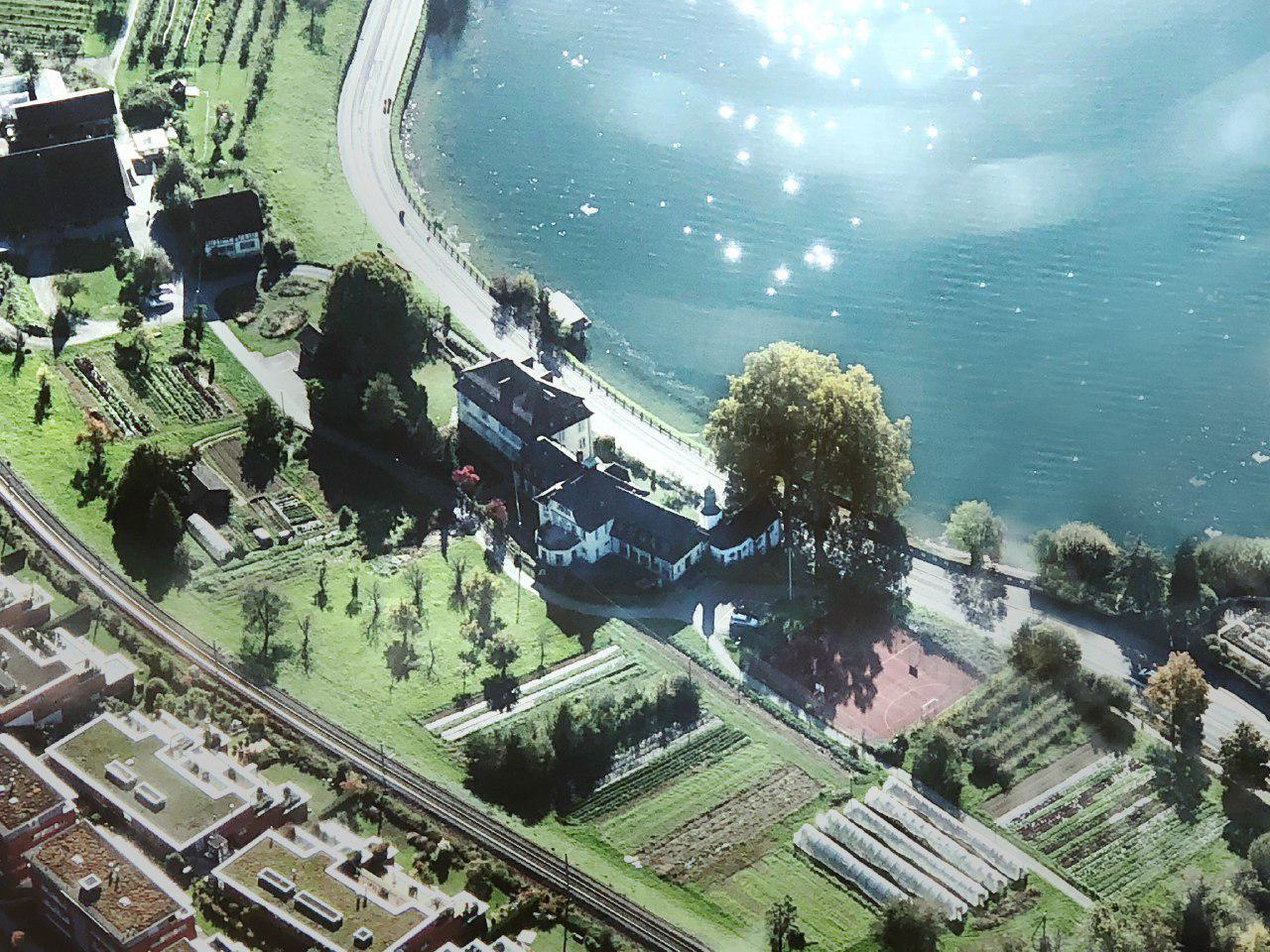
Salesianum Zug, Aerial view (Photo: 2018)
