= Ilias Kantzouris =

Greek basketball coach (born 1973)

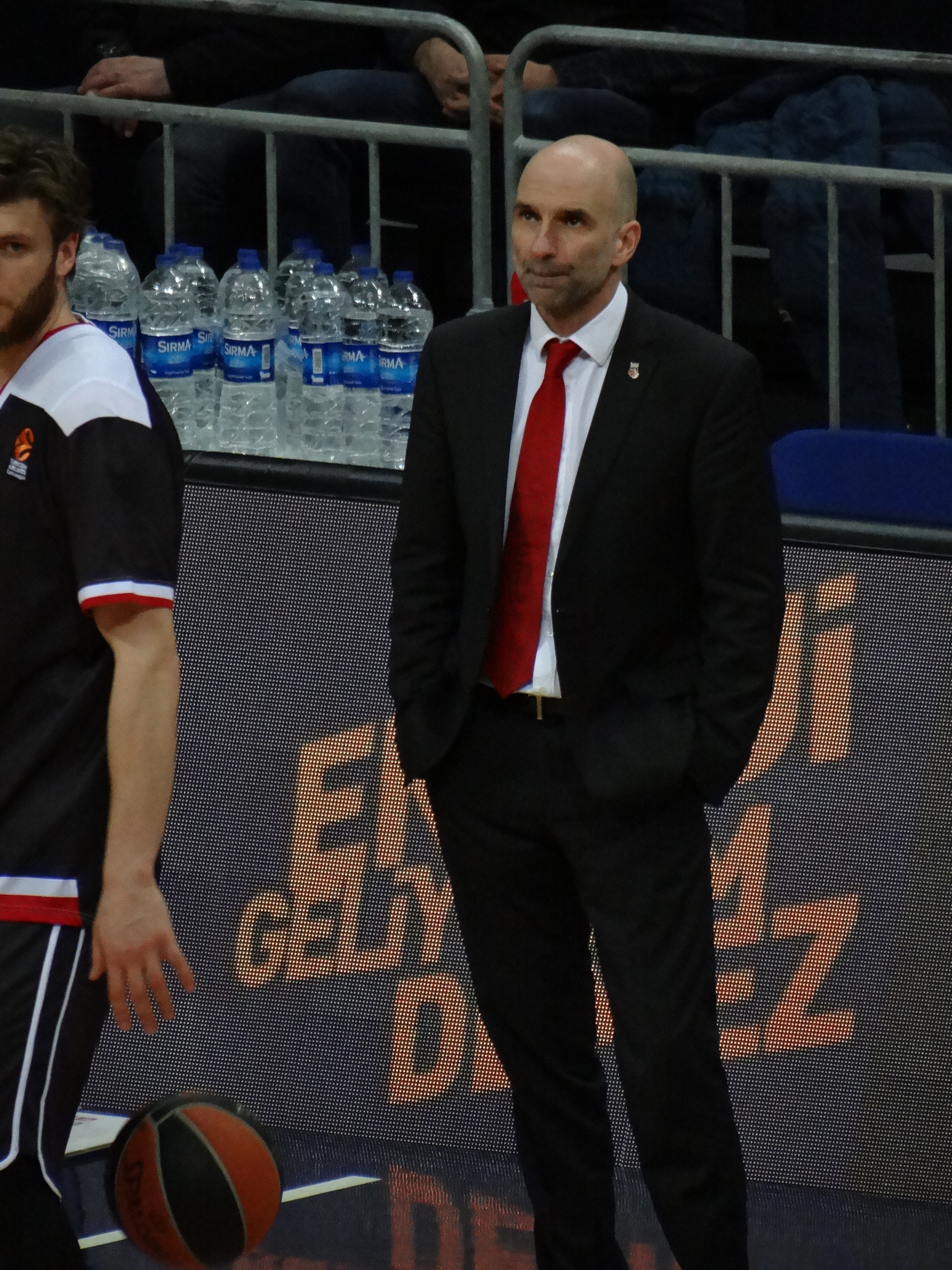
- Kantzouris as coach of Bamberg in 2018

Aris
- Position: Assistant coach
- League: Greek Basketball League; EuroCup

Personal information
- Born: August 11, 1973 (age 53) Greece
- Coaching career: 2000–present

Career history

Coaching
- 2000–2001: Apollon Patras (assistant)
- 2001–2003: Near East (assistant)
- 2005–2006: Aris Thessaloniki (assistant)
- 2006–2007: Sporting (assistant)
- 2007: AEK Athens (assistant)
- 2007–2011: Panellinios (assistant)
- 2011: Žalgiris Kaunas (assistant)
- 2013: Greece (assistant)
- 2013–2014: UNICS Kazan (assistant)
- 2014–2018: Brose Bamberg (assistant)
- 2018: Brose Bamberg (interim)
- 2018–2019: AEK Athens (assistant)
- 2020: Iraklis Thessaloniki
- 2020–2022: Kolossos Rodou
- 2022–2023: AEK Athens
- 2023–2024: Limoges
- 2024: Hapoel Jerusalem
- 2023–present: Greece (assistant)
- 2024–2026: AS Monaco (assistant)
- 2026–present: Aris (assistant)

Ilias Kantzouris (Greek: Ηλίας Καντζούρης; born August 11, 1973) is a Greek professional basketball coach. He currently serves as an assistant coach for Aris of the Greek Basketball League and the EuroCup, under head coach Vassilis Spanoulis. He is also an assistant coach for the senior men's Greek national team.

== Coaching career ==
=== Professional clubs ===
Kantzouris began his coaching career in 2000, as an assistant coach, with the Greek club Apollon Patras. He then worked as an assistant coach with the Greek clubs Near East, Aris Thessaloniki, and Sporting Athens. Following that, he worked as an assistant coach with the Greek clubs AEK Athens and Panellinios.

He was an assistant coach with the Lithuanian League club Žalgiris Kaunas in 2011. He was then an assistant coach with the Russian VTB United League club UNICS Kazan, in the 2013–14 season. After that, he worked as an assistant for the German League club Brose Bamberg, from 2014 to 2018.

Kantzouris then became the interim head coach of Brose Bamberg, after head coach Andrea Trinchieri was fired by the team, in February 2018. He worked as Brose's interim head coach until the club hired Luca Banchi as its new permanent head coach.

On January 28, 2020, Kantzouris signed with Greek Basket League club Iraklis Thessaloniki, in his first permanent head coaching role, replacing Ioannis Kastritis.

After two seasons as head coach of Kolossos Rodou, Kantzouris was appointed head coach of AEK Athens in July 2022. He parted ways with AEK in May 2023 and subsequently became head coach of French club Limoges CSP.

On January 10, 2024, he signed with Hapoel Jerusalem of the Israeli Basketball Premier League.

Later in 2024, Kantzouris joined the coaching staff of AS Monaco as an assistant to Vassilis Spanoulis. He remained with Monaco until 2026.

On 20 June 2026, Aris announced that Kantzouris had returned to the club as an assistant coach on Spanoulis' staff, alongside Kostas Charalampidis and Kostas Iliadis. It marked his second spell on Aris' coaching staff, having previously served as an assistant during the 2005–06 season.

=== Greece national team ===
Kantzouris first worked as an assistant coach of the senior men's Greece national basketball team, in 2013, as a member of Andrea Trinchieri's coaching staff.

In November 2023, Kantzouris returned to the Greek national team's coaching staff as an assistant to newly appointed head coach Vassilis Spanoulis, alongside Stefanos Triantafyllos and Diamantis Panagiotopoulos. He was part of Greece's coaching staff at the 2024 Summer Olympics and continues to serve as an assistant coach of the national team.
