= International School of Zug and Luzern =

Coordinates: 47.2103602°N 8.5546322°E

Location
- Walterswil 1 6340; Baar, Switzerland, ZG, CH-6340; Switzerland

Information
- Former names: International School of Zug (originally The Zug Anglo-American School, est 1961); The Riverside School (1990); The International School of Luzern (est 2006)
- School type: Non-profit, Independent, Co-educational, Day school
- Motto: Respect, Motivate, Achieve
- Founded: 1961
- Director: Barry Dequanne
- Faculty: 259
- Grades: Early Years / Primary School / Middle School / High School
- Gender: Co-ed
- Age: 1 years to 21 years
- Enrolment: 1250
- Education system: PYP, MYP and DP, IB World School, College Board Advanced Placement Courses
- Language: English, German, Spanish, French
- Hours in school day: 6
- Campus: Zug Campus (Baar ZG), Riverside Campus (Hünenberg, ZG), Chalet Bergheim (Wengen, BE)
- Campus type: Rural
- Colours: Blue and white
- Athletics: Soccer, basketball, rugby, cross country, sailing, softball, swimming, skiing, tennis, track & field, blind long jump
- Mascot: Eagles
- Nickname: ISZL
- Team name: Seeblick Bears
- Accreditation: CIS/NEASC, International Baccalaureate
- Affiliation: Swiss Group of International Schools, Council of International Schools, Council for Advancement and Support of Education, European Council of International Schools
- Website: www.iszl.ch

The International School of Zug and Luzern (ISZL) is a private, coeducational, non-profit day school in Switzerland for students aged 3 to 18 in the greater Zurich area. Founded in 1961, the school enrolls about 1,250 students of more than 50 nationalities, aiming to offer an international educational experience through the International Baccalaureate Program (IB). Located in Zug, approximately 34 kilometers from Zurich and 25 kilometers from Lucerne, ISZL currently operates two campuses, and also owns a Chalet located in the Bernese Alps. Until 2016, the School also had a campus in Lucerne.

In 2022 ISZL was awarded the International School of the Year Award for 2022 by ISC Research.

== Accreditation ==
ISZL is accredited by the Council of International Schools and the New England Association of Schools and Colleges. ISZL is also a fully authorised IB World School offering three IB programmes.

The ISZL Zug Campus in Baar (Zug) Early Years, Kindergarten, Primary School (Primarstufe 1.-6. Klasse, grade 1–6), Lower - Secondary School (Sekundarstufe I, grade 7–9) are approved by the Swiss bureau for elementary school (Amt für gemeindliche Schulen), administration for education (Bildungsdirektion), canton of Zug.

The ISZL Riverside Campus in Hünenberg (Zug) upper secondary education (High School: Sekundarstufe I (Grade 9) a.k.a. lower-secondary school grade 9, and Sekundarstufe II (Grade 10-13) a.k.a. upper-secondary school grade 10–13) is approved as a Sekundarstufe II by canton of Zug.

ISZL's (upper) secondary education (Middle and High School) is not approved as a Mittelschule/Collège/Liceo by the Swiss Federal State Secretariat for Education, Research and Innovation (SERI).

== History ==
The International School of Zug and Luzern (ISZL) was founded in 2008 following the merger of the International School of Zug, the International School of Luzern, and The Riverside School.

The International School of Zug (ISOZ) was founded 1961 in Zug, as The Zug Anglo-American School. Initially with just fourteen students, ISOZ provided an English speaking primary education for the expatriate families in the region.

The Riverside School was founded in 1990 as a university preparatory high school. It has been offering the College Boards Advanced Placement (AP) programme since its inception. In 2007, Riverside was authorised to offer the Diploma Programme of the International Baccalaureate (IB). In 2003, Riverside moved to the Salesianum, a landmark villa located on the shores of Lake Zug, which included tennis courts, a boat house and a chapel. As of 2010, the campus moved to a larger campus at Hünenberg.

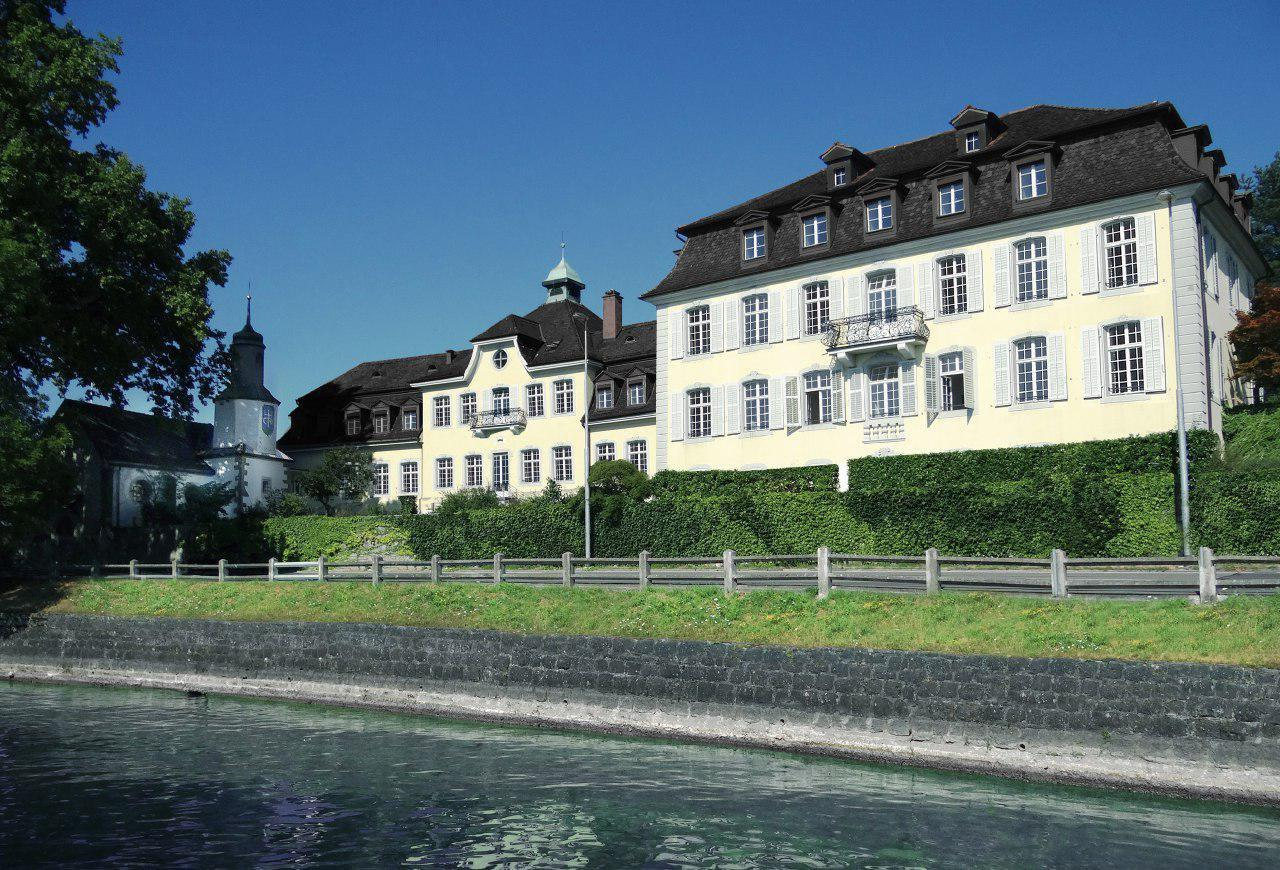

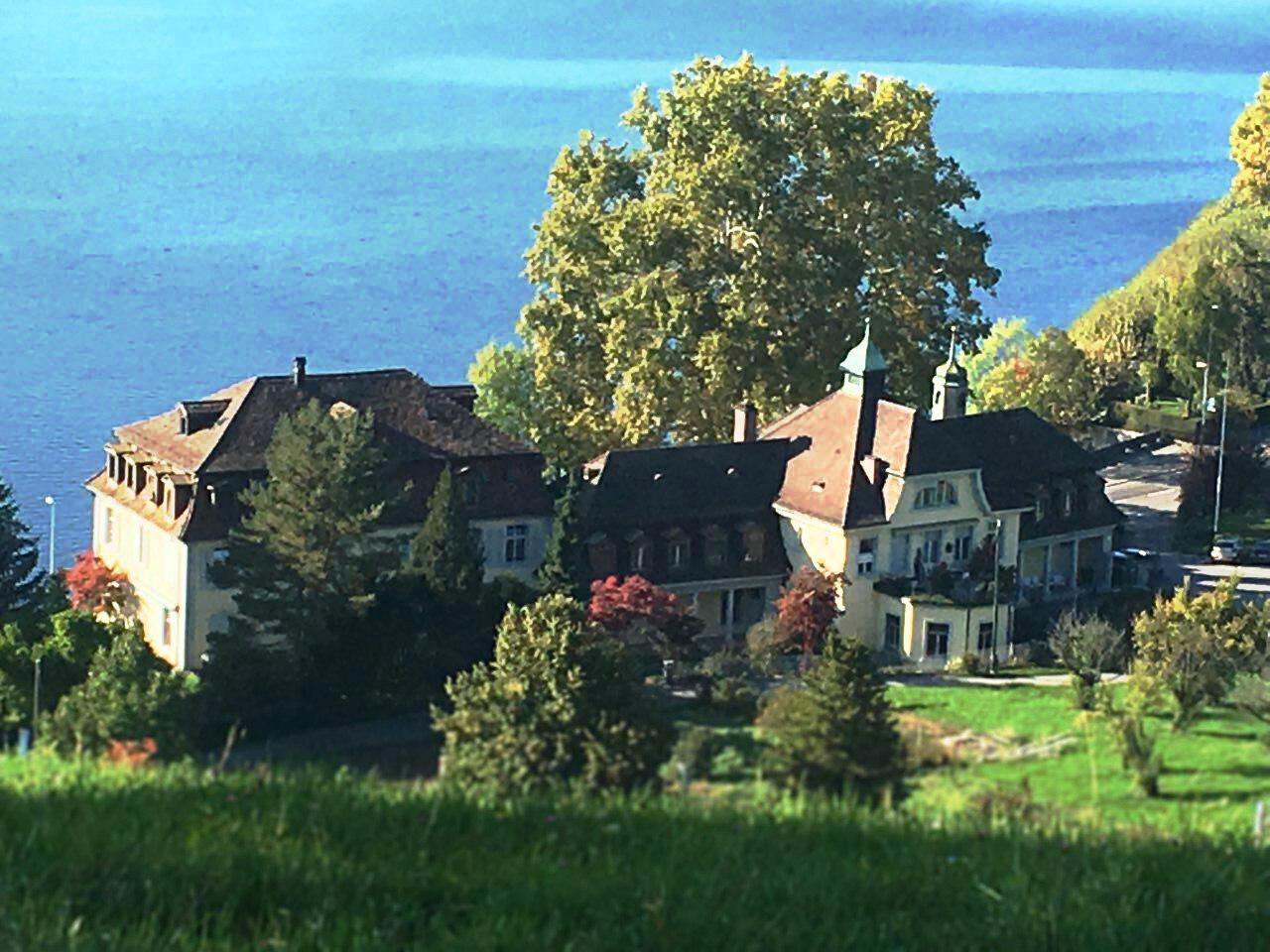
Between 2003 and 2010, the Riverside Campus was located in the Salesianum, a landmark villa built on the shores of Lake Zug between the 17th and 18th centuries.

The International School of Luzern (ISOL) was founded in 2006 as a sister school to the International School of Zug. ISOL was located in the Villa Krämerstein in Kastanienbaum, Horw (a suburb of Luzern). In the Summer of 2016, the Luzern campus closed.

With the merger of these schools on August 1, 2008, the new International School of Zug and Luzern (ISZL) serves the needs of around 1,250 students from more than 50 different nationalities.

== Campuses and facilities ==
Both the Zug campus and the Hünenberg campus are located in Canton of Zug and within the Zurich Metropolitan Area. The school also owns a Chalet in Wengen in the Bernese Alps.

=== Zug Campus ===
Primary and Middle School - Early Years to Grade 8.

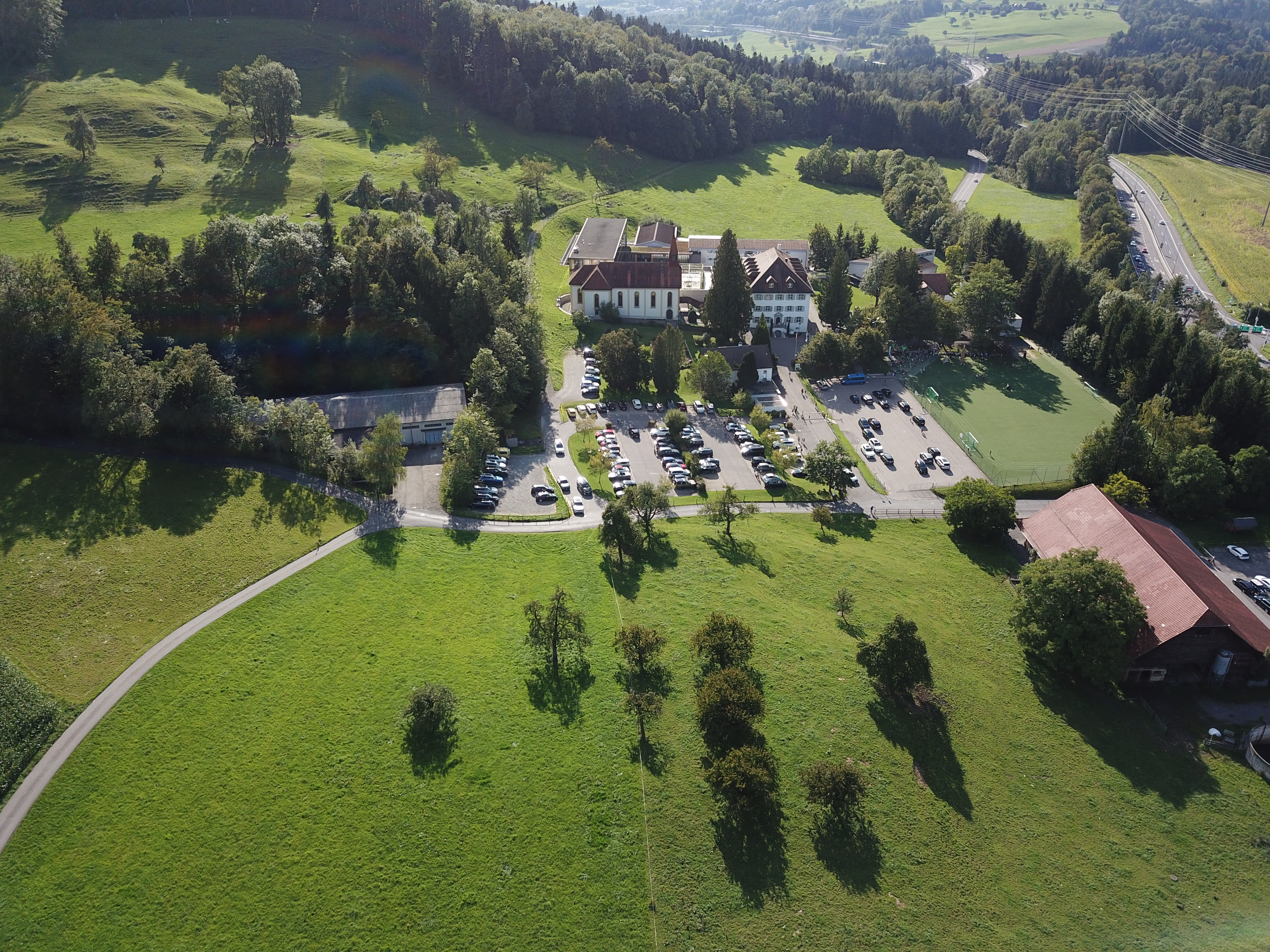
ISZL Zug Campus Baar

Home to over 800 students the Zug Campus is located in a rural setting on the outskirts of Baar and hosts the Primary School and Middle School, offering classes from Early Years 1 to Grade 8. The main building, the Wettinger House, was constructed in the late 17th century and is surrounded by modern classroom buildings. The Middle School is located in new facility providing science labs, the ISZL Gallery and the ISZL Theatre for school performances. The facilities also include two gymnasia, science laboratories, two libraries, music rooms and a dining hall. The campus has multiple well equipped outdoor playgrounds, two hardtop basketball courts, and an all-weather sports field.

=== Riverside Campus ===
The Riverside Campus is named after the Riverside School, a university, preparatory school which existed between 1990 and 2008, when it merged into ISZL. The campus serves grades 9 to 12 (Sixth form).

Since 2010, the Riverside Campus is located in Hünenberg and hosts the ISZL High School, in modern buildings supporting 420 High School students between the ages of 14 and 18. Facilities such as science laboratories, computer labs, art and music facilities, and a library. Additionally, the school has an all-weather hard court and a multipurpose sports field. In 2013 a triple gymnasium, containing gyms, a dance studio, fitness center, and climbing wall, was completed. Additionally, they hold an art factory where art students have space and facilities to work on their art.

=== Chalet Bergheim ===
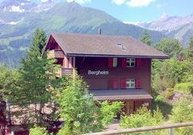
Chalet Bergheim, located in Wengen on the Bernese Alps

In the summer of 2008, ISZL bought Chalet Bergheim, a purpose-built wood chalet, located in the mountain village of Wengen, in the Berner Oberland. Chalet Bergheim has numerous bedrooms, a multi-purpose classroom and dining area. Chalet Bergheim is used year-round in support of the schools curriculum to include sports (skiing, snowboarding, hiking, etc.), sciences, visual arts and music.

== Language Programme ==
English as an Additional Language (EAL) A large number of the students in the school do not have English as their mother tongue. ISZL offers EAL classes to those students who require this additional instruction.

First Language (Mother Tongue) Programme As well as English language tuition, ISZL teaches over 25 first language classes and courses (Brazilian Portuguese, Bulgarian, Danish, Dutch, French, Finnish, Greek, Hungarian, Italian, Japanese, Mandarin Chinese, Norwegian, Portuguese, Russian, Spanish and Swedish).

== Sports ==
Physical Education is a compulsory part of the curriculum for students at ISZL. A variety of sports are offered at a competitive and non-competitive level, to include involvement at regional events. Boys' and girls' teams compete annually with other international schools at the Swiss Group of International Schools (SGIS) events in Switzerland.

Toni Rocak, who later became a member of Switzerland's national basketball team, played for the ISZL's team when he was a student there.

== Arts ==
Music is taught to all students, from Early Years to Grade 8, leading to an instrument of their choice. For older students, the four disciplines of visual art, dance, drama and music are offered. Multiple concerts, and musicals are produced at each division. The school has three choirs for various age groups. In the autumn of 2013, the Hünenberg campus opened an art facility to support multiple mediums of artistic expression.

== Youth Forum Switzerland ==
The Youth Forum Switzerland (YFS), was founded by a group of globally engaged high school students, who attended the World Economic Forum's - Open Forum Davos event in January 2017. Their transformative experience inspired them to organize an event in the same spirit, with the aim of giving youth in Switzerland a voice in global issues. YFS is a full day symposium comprising panel discussions, talks, and interactive activities centered on youth engagement in prevalent issues that will affect future generations. In 2019, over 600 high school students from Swiss and International Schools from attend YFS.

== See also ==
- International Baccalaureate
- Advanced Placement
