= Toni Ročak =

Swiss basketball player

Toni Rocak
No. 20 – Lions de Genève
- Position: Power forward
- League: LBL; LEBL

Personal information
- Born: 22 April 1999 (age 27)
- Listed height: 2.03 m (6 ft 8 in)
- Listed weight: 220 lb (100 kg)

Career information
- College: Regis (2018–2020); UC San Diego (2020–2022); San Francisco (2022–2023)

Career history
- 2016–2017: Swiss Central Basket
- 2023–2024: KK Dubrava
- 2024–2025: KK Cibona Zagreb
- 2025: UEB Cividale
- 2026: VEF Rīga
- 2026-present: Lions de Genève

Toni Rocak (born 22 April 1999) is a Swiss basketball player.

== Personal life ==
Rocak's family has Croatian roots. Rocak's family move to Switzerland when Toni was three years of age. He and his brother Niko owe their heights to their father Ante, a former European karate champion who became an owner of a fitness company. The family moved from Geneva, Switzerland to Zug for professional reasons. Here the brothers attended the International School of Zug and Luzern (ISZL) where they played basketball for the school team.

The website swisshopes.ch listed Toni as the country's second-best basketball prospect for players born in 1999.

In March 2017, the Swiss newspaper Luzerner Zeitung described Toni Rocak and his brother Niko as being "among the most talented basketball players of their year."

In addition to his native German and Croatian, Ročak speaks English and French.

== Early career ==
In the 2016–17 season, he saw action in six games of the Swiss Basketball League with Swiss Central Basket.

== College career ==
Rocak spent a year at Phillips Exeter Academy in Exeter, New Hampshire, before joining NCAA Division II school Regis University in 2018. In 2019–20, he collected All-Rocky Mountain Athletic Conference Honorable Mention status. In 2020, he transferred to NCAA D-I institution UC San Diego. A Business Psychology major, Rocak spent two seasons with the Tritons, averaging 15.1 points and 6.5 rebounds in the 2021–22 campaign. He transferred to the University of San Francisco in 2022. Rocak appeared in 18 games for the Dons during the 2022–23 campaign, scoring 2.3 points per contest.

== Professional career ==
Rocak signed with KK Dubrava of the Croatian HT Premijer liga on 11 August 2023. On 5 September 2024 he inked a deal with KK Cibona Zagreb. In 24 contests of the ABA League, he averaged 10.5 points per game for Cibona.

On September 27, 2025, he signed with UEB Cividale of Italy's Serie A2.

== National team ==
Alongside his brother, he played for Switzerland's U16 and U18 national teams.

He later became a member of the Swiss men's national team.
