= Luca Banchi =

Italian professional basketball coach (born 1965)

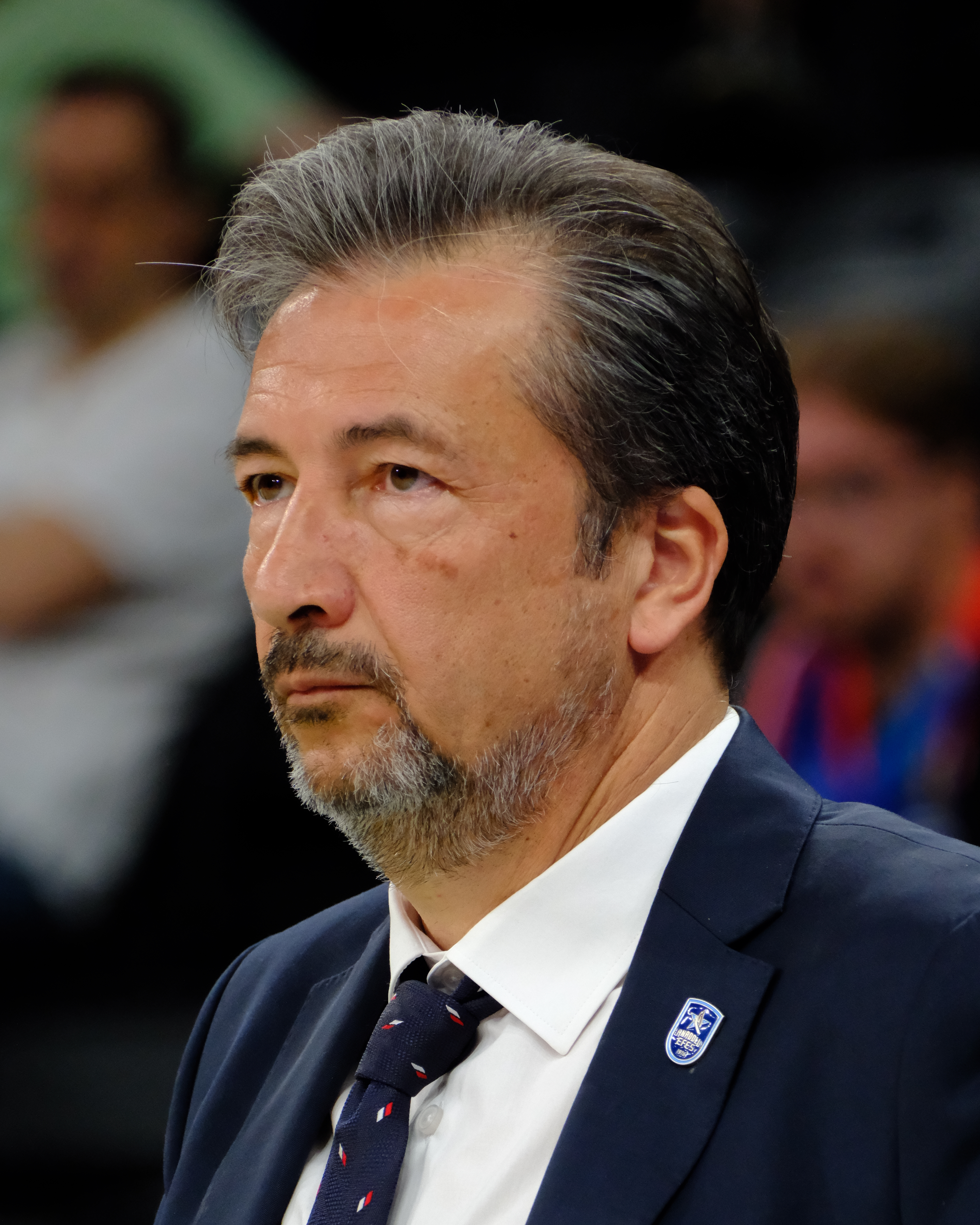
- Banchi in 2025

Olimpia Milano
- Position: Head coach
- League: LBA; EuroLeague

Personal information
- Born: 1 August 1965 (age 61) Grosseto, Italy
- Coaching career: 1985–present

Career history

Coaching
- 1985–1986: F. A. Vigna di Valle (assistant)
- 1986–1987: Affirco Firenze (assistant)
- 1987–1997: Livorno (youth teams)
- 1997–1999: Livorno
- 1999–2001: Trieste
- 2001–2004: Livorno
- 2004–2005: Trapani
- 2005–2006: Aurora Basket Jesi
- 2006–2012: Montepaschi Siena (assistant)
- 2012–2013: Montepaschi Siena
- 2013–2015: Olimpia Milano
- 2017–2018: Auxulium Torino
- 2018: Brose Bamberg
- 2018–2019: AEK Athens
- 2019: Lokomotiv Kuban
- 2020–2021: Long Island Nets (assistant)
- 2021–2025: Latvia
- 2021–2022: Pesaro
- 2022–2023: SIG Strasbourg
- 2023–2024: Virtus Bologna
- 2025: Anadolu Efes
- 2025–present: Italy
- 2026–present: Olimpia Milano

Career highlights
- As head coach: FIBA Intercontinental Cup winner (2019); 2× Lega Serie A champion (2013, 2014); Italian Cup winner (2013); Italian Supercup winner (2023); FIBA World Cup Best Coach (2023)
Medals
Men's basketball
Representing Italy
Mediterranean Games
Bronze medal – third place	2001 Pescara	Event

Luca Banchi (born 1 August 1965) is an Italian professional basketball coach. He is currently the head coach of Olimpia Milano of the Italian Lega Basket Serie A (LBA) and the EuroLeague, and the Italy national team.

== Club coaching career ==
=== Italy ===
Banchi began working as a basketball coach in the youth teams of Basketball Grosseto, after which he was an assistant coach for the Armed Forces Vigna di Valle, and Affrico Firenze. Between 1987 and 1999, he coached the junior teams of Livorno, winning three consecutive youth national titles in the period, from 1995 to 1997.

He was then promoted to head coach of Basket Livorno, in the Italian second-tier level Serie A2. In 1999, he made his debut on the bench of Pall Trieste, where he coached for two years, before returning to Livorno, that had meanwhile been promoted to the Italian top-tier level LBA. He followed that up with two stops in the Italian 2nd Division, in Trapani and Aurora Basket Jesi.

In 2006, he became the assistant coach of Montepaschi Siena, under head coach Simone Pianigiani. As an assistant with Montepaschi, he won six 6 Italian League championships in a row (2007–2012), five Italian Super Cups (2007–2011), and four Italian Cups (2009–2012). In June 2012, he took over the role of head coach of Montepaschi Siena, following the departure of Simone Pianigiani to Fenerbahçe. On 10 February 2013, he won the Italian Cup, after defeating Pallacanestro Varese, by a score of 77–74 in the final game. On 19 June 2013, he also won his first Italian League championship, as a head coach.

On 1 July 2013, he signed a two-year deal to become the head coach of the Italian European-wide top-tier level EuroLeague club, Olimpia Milano. In his first season with the team, he won the Italian League championship, repeating the previous success of Carlo Recalcati, as the only head coaches who won consecutive Italian League titles, with different teams.

In the 2017–18 season, he was the head coach of the European-wide second-tier level EuroCup team, Auxulium Torino.

=== Brose Bamberg (2018) ===
On 4 March 2018, Banchi became the head coach of the German club Brose Bamberg, of the German top-tier level Basketball Bundesliga (BBL), and the EuroLeague.

=== AEK Athens (2018–2019) ===
On 1 July 2018, Banchi was appointed as the head coach of AEK Athens of the Greek Basket League (GBL) and FIBA Champions League (BCL). On 17 June 2019 his contracted at AEK Athens was terminated.

=== Lokomotiv Kuban (2019) ===
On 5 July 2019, he signed with Lokomotiv Kuban of the VTB United League. On 15 November 2019, his contract with Kuban has been terminated.

=== Victoria Libertas Pesaro (2021–2022) ===
On 20 October 2021, Banchi signed with Victoria Libertas Pesaro to replace Aco Petrović. After a slow start, Pesaro made multiple winning streaks during the season and qualified for the playoffs.

=== SIG Strasbourg (2022–2023) ===
On 16 November 2022, Banchi signed with SIG Strasbourg and helped the team to raise from the last place to playoffs in French ProA, as well as a playoff spot in Basketball Champions League

=== Virtus Bologna (2023–2024) ===
On 15 September 2023, after Scariolo was fired following controversial statements regarding the new roster and the upcoming season, he became new head coach of Virtus Bologna, and signed a two-year contract. Returning to the Euroleague, after a 5-year break. A week later, the team won the first title under the new coach, winning the Italian Supercup. On 24 September 2023, after having ousted Olimpia Milano in the semifinals, Virtus won its fourth Supercup, and the third in a row, defeating 97–60 Germani Brescia. On 5 December 2024, Banchi resigned as head coach after a 2–11 start in the EuroLeague.

=== Anadolu Efes (2025) ===
On 7 January 2025, Banchi was appointed as head coach of Anadolu Efes of the Basketbol Süper Ligi (BSL) and the EuroLeague for the remainder of the 2024–25 season.

=== Return to Olimpia Milano (2026–present) ===
On 8 November 2026, Banchi was appointed as head coach of Olimpia Milano of the Lega Basket Serie A (LBA) and the EuroLeague.

== National teams ==
=== Latvia (2021–2025) ===
On 25 March 2021, Luca Banchi was announced as the next head coach of the Latvia national team. Latvia became one of the two European teams to qualify for the 2023 FIBA Basketball World Cup after starting their journey at the World Cup Pre-Qualifiers.

In the country's World Cup debut in 2023, Banchi led the team to a fifth place finish and received the award for the Best Coach of the tournament. Starting with the Pre-Qualifiers, Latvia had won 21 out of 24 games under coach Banchi. Two years later, following Latvia's round of 16 exit at EuroBasket 2025, Banchi stepped down as head coach of their national team.

=== Italy (2025–present) ===
On 30 September 2025, the Italian Basketball Federation announced the hiring of Banchi to a three-year contract as head coach of the Italy national team.

== Coaching record ==
Legend
G	Games coached	W	Games won	L	Games lost	W–L %	Win-loss %

Note: The EuroLeague is not the only competition in which the team played during the season. He also coached in domestic competition, and regional competition if applicable.

=== EuroLeague ===
Team	Year	G	W	L	W–L%	Result
Montepaschi	2012–13	24	12	12	.500	Eliminated in Top 16 stage
Milano	2013–14	28	16	12	.571	Eliminated in quarterfinals
Milano	2014–15	24	9	15	.375	Eliminated in Top 16 stage
Bamberg	2017–18	6	2	4	.333	Eliminated in regular season
Virtus Bologna	2023–24	36	18	18	.500	Eliminated in the play-in round
Virtus Bologna	2024–25	13	2	11	.154	Parted ways
Career		131	59	72	.450	
