= Daniel Lekndreaj =

Albanian basketball player (born 1997)

No. 13 – Peja
- Position: Shooting guard / small forward
- League: Kosovo Basketball Superleague

Personal information
- Born: 16 November 1997 (age 28) Shkodër, Albania
- Listed height: 1.92 m (6 ft 4 in)
- Listed weight: 95 kg (209 lb)

Career information
- NBA draft: 2019: undrafted
- Playing career: 2015–present

Career history
- 2015–2019: Vllaznia
- 2019–2020: Partizani
- 2020: Goga Basket
- 2020–2021: Prishtina
- 2021–2022: Peja
- 2022–2023: Bashkimi
- 2023–2025: Prishtina
- 2023–2024: →Vëllaznimi
- 2025–present: Peja

Career highlights
- Liga Unike champion (2022); Kosovo Cup winner (2021); Albanian League champion (2015)

Daniel Lekndreaj (born 16 November 1997) is an Albanian-Kosovan basketball player for Peja of the Kosovo Basketball Superleague. He is also a part of the Albanian national team.

== Professional career ==
Lekndreaj started his professional career in 2015 at his hometown club Vllaznia.

In 2020, he left Partizani and signed for Goga Basket.

In 2020, he signed for Prishtina of the Kosovo Superleague. In 2021, Lekndreaj signed for Peja of the Kosovo Superleague and Liga Unike.
