= Lucas Tohătan =

Romanian basketball player

No. 4 – CS Vâlcea 1924
- Position: Point guard
- League: Liga Națională

Personal information
- Born: 15 March 1999 (age 27)
- Listed height: 1.87 m (6 ft 2 in)

Career information
- Playing career: 2016–present

Career history
- 2018–2022: CSU Sibiu
- 2022–2025: CSO Voluntari
- 2025–present: CS Vâlcea 1924

Lucas Tohătan (born 15 March 1999) is a Romanian professional basketball player for CS Vâlcea 1924 of the Liga Națională in Romania.

== National team ==
Tohătan has been a member of the Romanian national basketball team.
