= Çelis Taflaj =

Albanian basketball player

No. 4 – Vigevano
- Position: Small forward
- League: Serie A2

Personal information
- Born: 12 March 1998 (age 28) Shkodër, Albania
- Listed height: 6 ft 7.5 in (2.02 m)
- Listed weight: 178 lb (81 kg)

Career information
- Playing career: 2012–present

Career history
- 2012–2013: KK Ulcinj
- 2016–2018: Viola Reggio Calabria
- 2017: →Stella Azzurra Roma (playout)
- 2018–2019: Blu Basket 1971
- 2019: Benedetto XIV Cento
- 2019–2020: Andrea Costa Imola
- 2020–2021: Orlandina Basket
- 2021–2022: Trapani Shark
- 2022–2023: Basket Torino
- 2023–2024: Fortitudo Bologna
- 2024–present: Vigevano

Çelis Taflaj (born 12 March 1998) is an Albanian professional basketball player for the Italian side Nuova Pallacanestro Vigevano 1955 in Serie A2, as well as the Albania national team.

== Career ==
He played for KK Ulcinj in the 2012/2013 season.

He played for the Italian side Viola Reggio Calabria in Serie A2 for two years. In 2017, he became part of Stella Azzurra Roma for the play-out games.
