= Rei Pullazi =

Albanian basketball player

No. 55 – Sidigas Avellino
- Position: Power forward
- League: Serie A2

Personal information
- Born: 3 October 1993 (age 33) Rome, Italy
- Listed height: 6 ft 8 in (2.03 m)
- Listed weight: 220 lb (100 kg)

Career information
- NBA draft: 2015: undrafted
- Playing career: 2011–present

Career history
- 2011–2015: Virtus Roma
- 2011–2012: →Eurobasket Roma
- 2012–2013: →Basket Scauri
- 2013–2014: →Basket Recanati
- 2015–2017: Bergamo Basket
- 2017–2018: Legnano Knights
- 2018–2019: Pallacanestro Trapani
- 2019–2020: Derthona Basket
- 2020–2021: Bergamo Basket
- 2021–2022: Forlì 2.015
- 2022–2023: Urania Milano
- 2023–2025: Trapani Shark
- 2025: APU Udine
- 2025–2026: Scafati Basket
- 2026–present: Sidigas Avellino

Career highlights
- Serie A2 champion (2024)

Rei Pullazi (born 3 October 1993) is an Albanian professional basketball player for the Italian side Sidigas Avellino of the Serie A2, as well as the Albania national team.

== National team career ==
Pullazi is part of the Albania national team since 2017. He was part of the team in the EuroBasket Pre-Qualifiers 2019, World Cup pre-qualifiers 2021 and EuroBasket pre-qualifiers 2023.
