= Ardhmëria Basket =

- Leagues: Albanian Basketball League
- Founded: 2006
- History: 2006–present
- Arena: Asllan Rusi Sports Palace
- Capacity: 3,000
- Location: Tirana, Albania
- Team colors: Black, orange
- Head coach: Afrim Bilali
- Championships: 1 Albanian First Division
Home	Away

Ardhmëria Basket is an Albanian basketball club based in Tirana, Albania.

== History ==
Ardhmëria Basket was founded in 2006, initially as a basketball school for the local youth. The club created the senior team in 2015 and in its first competitive season, it won the 2015–16 Albanian Basketball First Division, achieving the promotion to the Albanian Basketball League, the highest level of basketball in the country.

== Trophies ==
- Albanian First Division: 1

2015–16
