= Tirana Eagles Basket =

Tirana Eagles Basketball Club
- Leagues: Albanian First Division; Albanian Cup
- Founded: October 8, 2014; 11 years ago
- Arena: Asllan Rusi Sports Palace
- Capacity: 3,000
- Location: Tirana, Albania
- Team colors: Red, Grey, Black
- President: Piro Tanku
- Head coach: Klarent Dedaj
- Championships: 0
Home	Away

Tirana Eagles Basket is an Albanian professional basketball team that plays in the Albanian Basketball First Division.

== Players ==
=== Current roster ===
Note: Flags indicate national team eligibility at FIBA-sanctioned events. Players may hold other non-FIBA nationalities not displayed.

Tirana Eagles Basketball Club roster
Players
Coaches

Pos.	No.	Nat.	Name	Ht.	Wt.	Age
G	00	(United States)	Laperi, Arnold	1.86 m (6 ft 1 in)	86 kg (190 lb)	34 – 31 August 1991
F	4	(Albania)	Adili, Mirsad	1.92 m (6 ft 4 in)	93 kg (205 lb)	32 – 16 January 1994
G	5	(Albania)	Vogli, Arlindo	1.81 m (5 ft 11 in)	00 kg (0 lb)	30 – 28 April 1995
F	7	(Albania)	Isaku, Enea	1.93 m (6 ft 4 in)	90 kg (198 lb)	37 – 1 January 1989
PG	10	(Albania)	Nikolli, Francesko	1.78 m (5 ft 10 in)	00 kg (0 lb)	29 – 20 September 1996
F/C	21	(Albania)	Kala, Lusien	1.97 m (6 ft 6 in)	00 kg (0 lb)	40 – 9 March 1985

Head coach

- (Albania) Klarent Dedaj

Legend

- (C) Team captain
- Injured
